= Alcide =

Alcide is the French and Italian version of "Alcides", another name for Heracles.

Alcide may also refer to:

== Art, entertainment, and media ==
- Alcide (Bortniansky), a 1778 opera by Dmitry Bortniansky
- Alcide (Marais), a 1693 opera by Marin Marais and Louis Lully
- Alcide Herveaux, a fictional character from The Southern Vampire Mysteries / Sookie Stackhouse Novels by Charlaine Harris
- Alcide, a fictional policeman in the French TV series The Returned
- Alcide Nikopol, the main character of the Nikopol Trilogy novels by French cartoonist Enki Bilal
- Alcide Jolivet, a fictional journalist in the novel Michael Strogoff: The Courier of the Czar by Jules Verne

== Ships ==
- French ship Alcide (1743)
- French ship Alcide (1782)
- HMS Alcide, a list of ships with this name

== Other uses ==
- Alcide (horse) (1955–1973), a British Thoroughbred racehorse
- 8549 Alcide, a main belt asteroid
- Cyclone Alcide, in 2018
