= Creonte (opera) =

- opera seria by Dmytro Bortnyansky
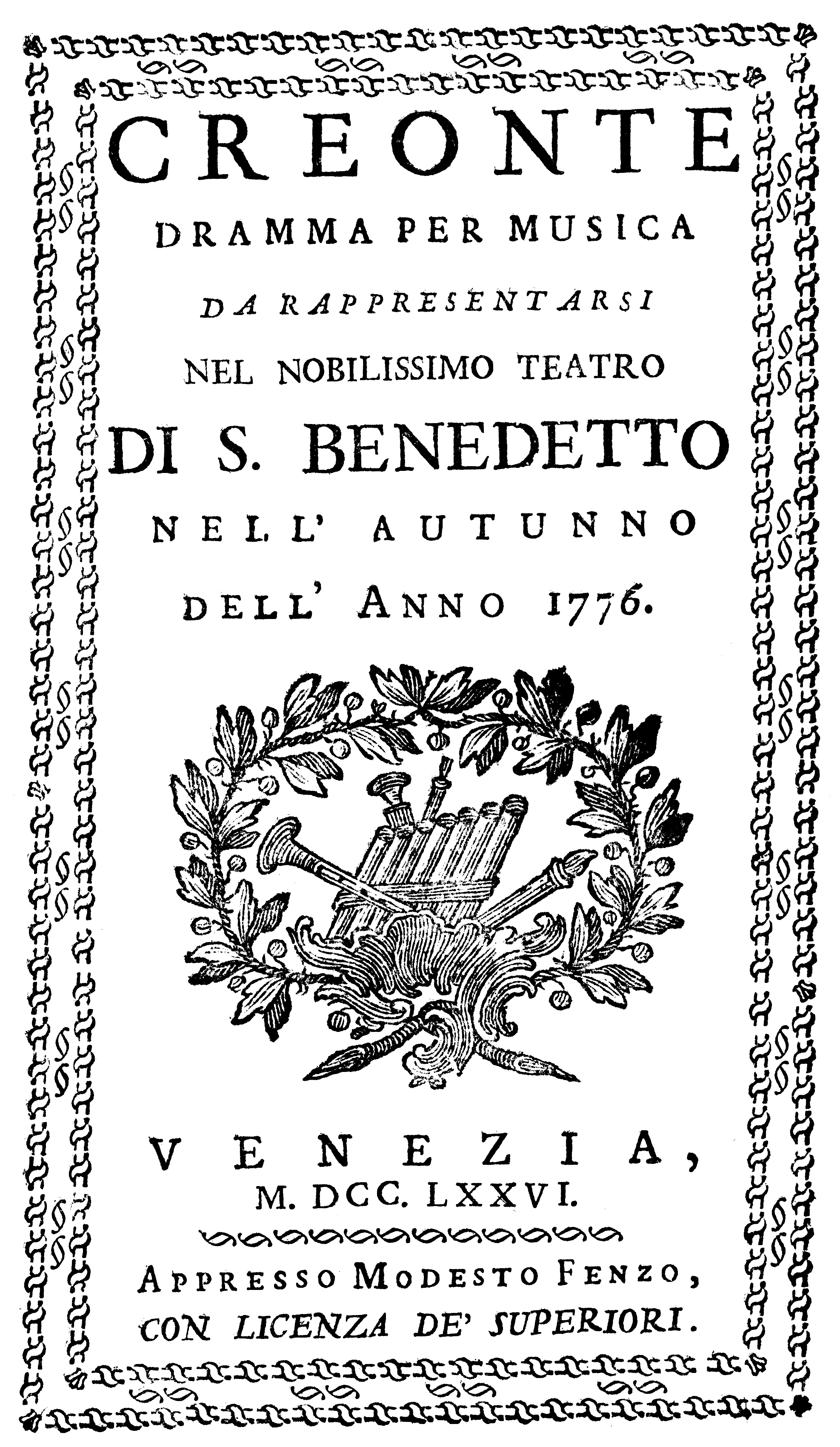
- Description: Title page of the printed libretto of the opera Creonte
- Native title: Creonte
- Librettist: Marco Coltellini
- Language: italian
- Based on: Antigone by Sophocles
- Premiere: 26 November 1776; Teatro San Benedetto in Venice

Creonte, (Italian Creonte) is the first opera by Dmytro Bortniansky, consisting of two acts (14 and 8 scenes) with a libretto by Marco Coltellini based on Sophocles' tragedy Antigone (441 BCE). The premiere took place in 1776 at the Teatro San Benedetto in Venice. After the premiere, for unknown reasons, the score disappeared and was considered lost for almost 250 years. The handwritten score was discovered by the American researcher Mariyka Kuzma in 2001 in the archives of the Ajuda Library (Lisbon, Portugal). In 2023, the manuscript was brought to Ukraine by Ukrainian musicologist Olga Shumilina.

The world premiere of the rediscovered and restored opera in a concert production took place on November 11, 2024, at the Diplomatic Academy of Ukraine, conducted by UNESCO Artist for Peace Herman Makarenko.

== Plot and structure ==
=== Background ===
The opera is set in legendary ancient times in the city of Thebes. It is based on the well-known myth about King Oedipus, his sons Eteocles and Polynices, and his daughters Antigone and Ismene. After Jocasta's suicide and Oedipus' exile, the throne remains without a ruler, leading to a struggle between his sons.

=== Act One ===
Eteocles and Polynices fight for power and kill each other in a duel. The citizens of Thebes choose Creonte (Creon in Greek mythology) as ruler, and he ascends to the throne. The newly elected king orders the burial of Eteocles with honors, while Polynices' body is left unburied. Antigone, defying the order, secretly buries her brother and is sentenced to be walled up alive in a cave. Creonte's son, Haemon, who is in love with Antigone, tries to save her but is suspected of treason and is also sentenced to death.

=== Act Two ===
Antigone is walled up in the cave, and Haemon sneaks in to share her fate. The people, outraged by Creonte's cruelty, rise up and proclaim Antigone as queen. She is freed, and Antigone assures that she forgives Creonte. The opera ends with hope for the restoration of peace in Thebes.

Creonte was written in the genre of Italian opera-seria. True to the tradition that originated in the early days of the opera genre (Florentine Camerata, late sixteenth century), the printed libretto of 1776 defines Creonte as drama per musica. Comprising two acts (14 and 8 scenes), the opera follows a structured format with solo arias, duets, recitatives, choruses, and instrumental pieces. Initially, the libretto was divided into three acts, but Bortniansky merged the first and second acts. To balance this disproportion, the performance featured two ballet divertissements choreographed and performed by Giuseppe Canciani, as noted in the printed libretto.

The music of Creonte combines the traditions of Italian bel canto with Bortniansky's individual style. It aligns with the operatic style of Mozart, bridging works like Mitridate (1770) and Idomeneo (1780). This suggests a shared influence of Italian operatic traditions on the development of both composers. The opera has a numbered structure and secco recitatives, which indicate a connection with the Baroque opera, but there are no Baroque da capo arias. An innovative step in Bortniansky's first opera was the composer's attempt to express the psychological development of the main characters of the opera through music.

== Creation ==
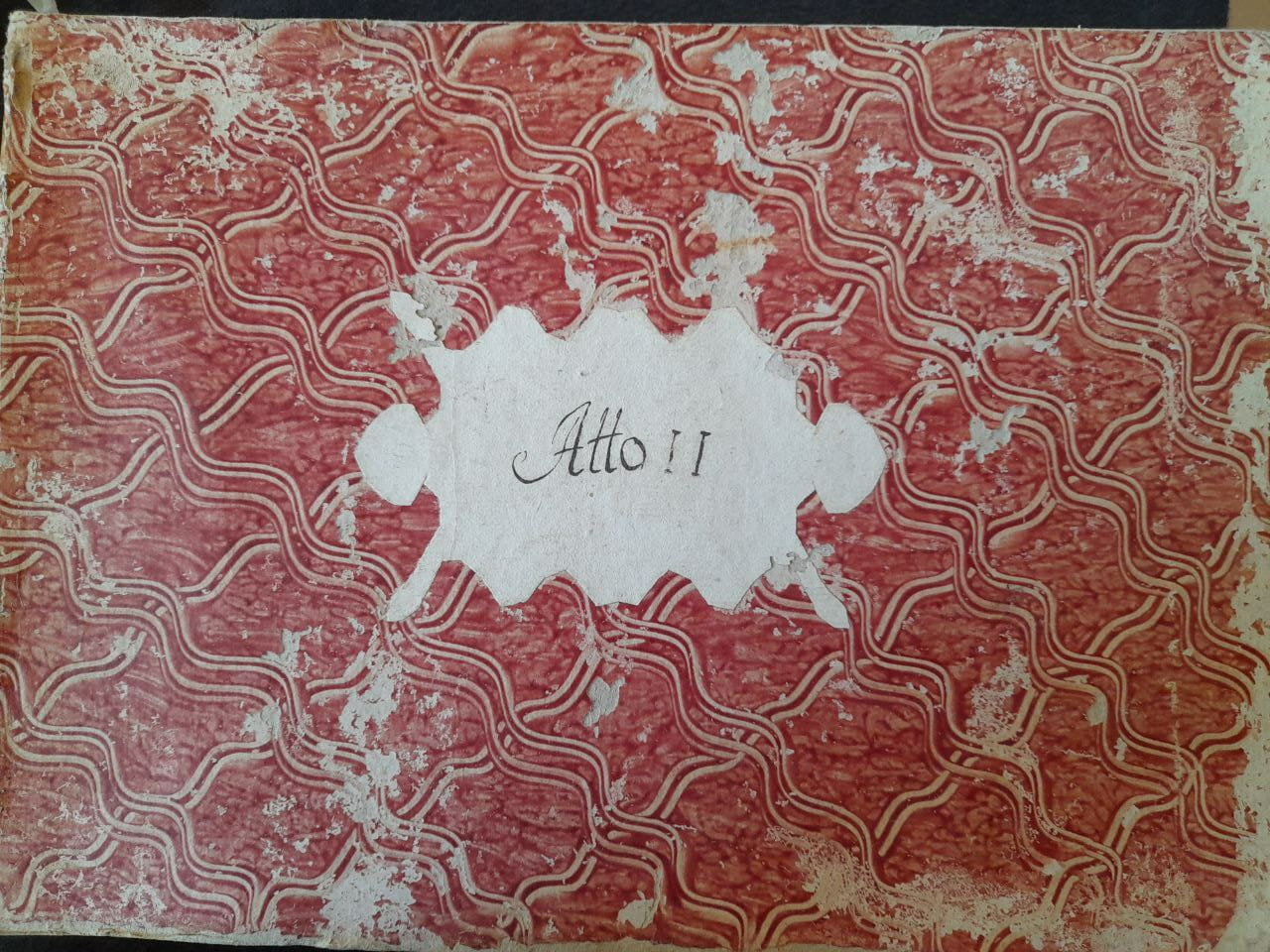
Title page of Act II of the handwritten score of the opera Creonte

An outstanding contribution to Dmytro Bortniansky's creative legacy were his operas. The composer created six operas, the first three of which, in the opera seria genre, he composed in Italy. Dmytro Bortniansky composed his first opera, Creonte, at the age of 25 in Italy. It was the result of the Ukrainian composer's studies with the famous Italian maestro Baldassare Galuppi (1706–1785). The opera premiered in 1776 at the San Benedetto theater in Venice.

The Swiss researcher Rudolf Mooser discovered a printed libretto published in Venice during a production. Mooser found that the libretto for "Creonte" is an adapted version of the libretto for the opera "Antigone" by the Italian composer Tommaso Traetta, based on Sophocles' tragedy of the same name. The text was written by the Italian poet Marco Coltellini. Traetta's opera "Antigone" reflected the composer's reformist approach to the opera genre. Coltellini and Traetta worked at the imperial court in St. Petersburg, where the premiere of "Antigone" took place in 1772. Subsequently, in 1773, it was performed in Italy, where Bortniansky likely had the opportunity to hear it, inspiring him to create his own version of the story. Comparing the libretto of "Antigone" with that of "Creonte", Mooser discovered that Bortniansky simplified the text, reducing it from three acts to two and changing its title. However, unlike the original, Bortniansky's opera ends happily (lieto fine).

== Performance history ==
=== World premiere ===
The initial performance of Creonte took place on November 26, 1776, at the San Benedetto Theatre in Venice. It ran for an entire 1776–1777 theatrical season. It was well received by the Italian audience of that time, known for its high standards and deep knowledge of music. There were plans to stage the opera in other European countries, but for unknown reasons, the score disappeared. For almost 250 years, Dmytro Bortniansky's first opera was believed to be lost.

=== Rediscovery and restoration ===
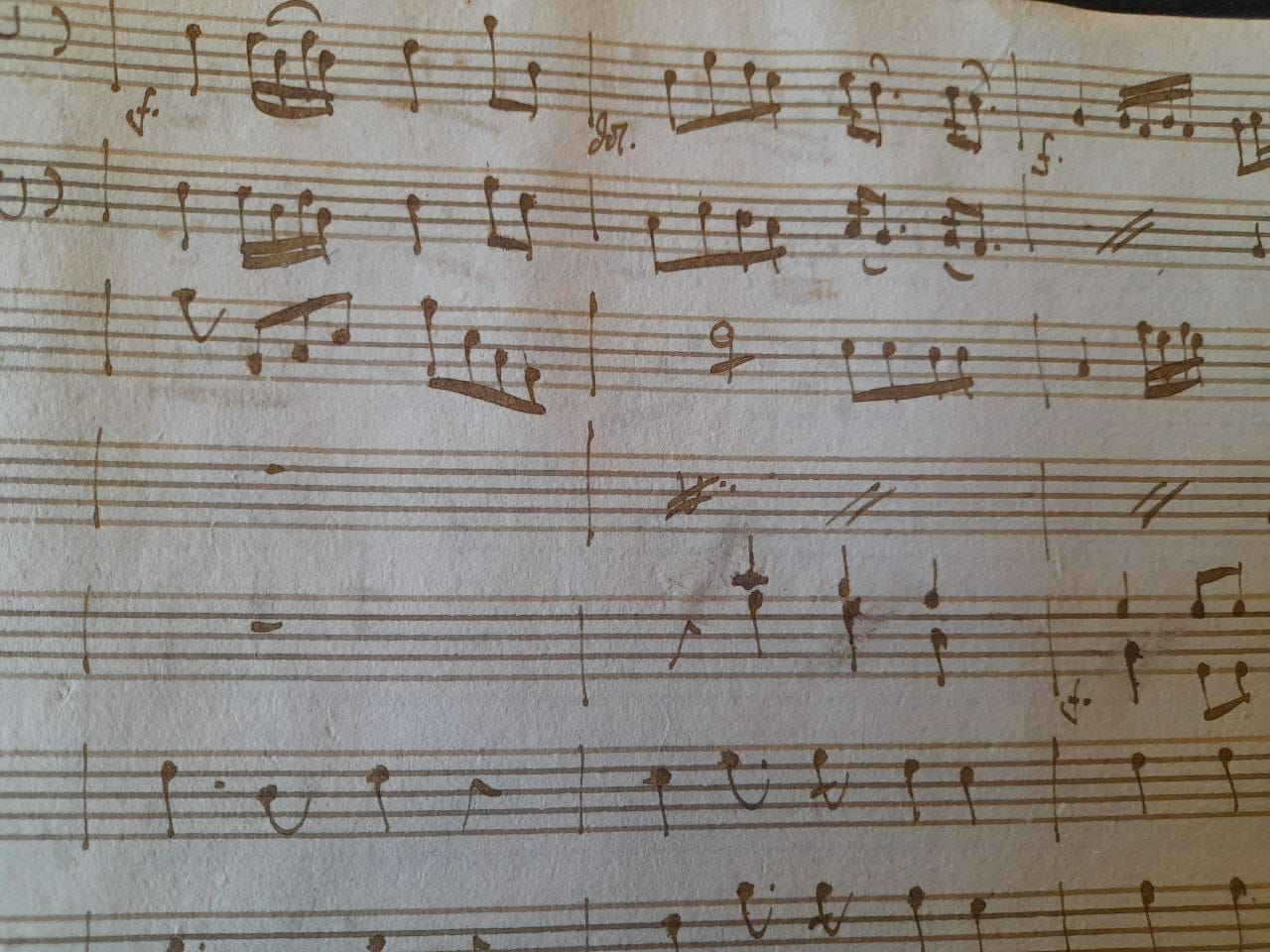
Fragment of a page from the handwritten score of the opera Creonte

The search for the handwritten score of the opera Creonte led researchers to Portugal. The opera was found in the Ajuda Library, a former division of the National Library of Portugal that is now an independent institution housing the music collections of the Portuguese royal court. Records show that Bortniansky's opera was already listed in the royal opera collection in 1803 and was mentioned in the printed catalog of the National Library of Portugal's manuscript collections in 1958.

The score of the opera is preserved in two handwritten books, with each act in a separate volume, comprising a total of 270 sheets or 540 pages. In 2023, copies of the handwritten score of Creonte were brought to Ukraine for research and future performance by Ukrainian musicologist, Professor of the Department of Music Theory at the Lviv National Music Academy named after Mykola Lysenko, Doctor of Arts Olga Shumilina.

The 540 pages of Dmytro Bortniansky's rediscovered manuscript were carefully studied, digitized, and adapted for modern performance. It was translated into Ukrainian for modern performances by Maksym Strikha.

== Modern world premiere ==
On November 11, 2024, the opera Creonte was given a second life, revived with the support of UNESCO, and returned to the world during its global premiere in concert form. The event took place in Kyiv at the Diplomatic Academy of Ukraine, part of the Ministry of Foreign Affairs of Ukraine, with the patronage of UNESCO, Europa Nostra, and the National Commission of Ukraine for UNESCO. The project was directed and conducted by UNESCO Artist for Peace Herman Makarenko, the leader of the project "Returning to the World of Dmytro Bortniansky’s First Opera "Creonte".

The first performer of the role of Creonte was Serhiy Bortnyk, the role of Antigone was performed by Olha Fomichova, the role of Haemon by Danylo Kotok, the role of Adrastus by Stanislav Pashchuk, the role of Ismene by Margarita Bilokiz, with the participation of the National Honored Academic Chapel of Ukraine "Dumka" and the National Presidential Orchestra (harpsichord part by Olga Shadrina-Lychak). The premiere took place thanks to the support of patrons: Mohammad Zahoor, Pavlo Shylko, Yuliia Iatsechko, and Mark Burden.

On October 3, 2025, the opera Creonte returned to the theatrical stage. The premiere took place in Chernivtsi (Ukraine), at the Olha Kobylianska Chernivtsi Academic Regional Ukrainian Music and Drama Theatre, under the patronage of UNESCO and Europa Nostra. The conductor and music director of the opera was Herman Makarenko, the author of the project "Returning to the World of Dmytro Bortniansky’s First Opera "Creonte".

The role of Creonte was performed by Serhiy Bortnyk, Antigone – Olha Fomichova, Haemon – Volodymyr Fysiuk, Adrastus – Vasyl Ponayda, and Ismene – Marharyta Bilokiz.

== Cast ==
Role	Voice type	Premiere cast, November 26, 1776 Conductor: Dmytro Bortniansky	Performers of the world premiere in a concert performance, November 11, 2024 Conductor: Herman Makarenko	Performers of the world premiere of the theatrical production, October 3, 2025 Conductor: Herman Makarenko
Creonte, King of Thebes	tenor	Giacomo Panati	Serhiy Bortnyk	Serhiy Bortnyk
Antigone, niece of Creonte, daughter of Oedipus	soprano	Agata Carrara	Olha Fomichova	Olha Fomichova
Haemon, son of Creonte	male soprano	Sebastiano Folicaldi	Danylo Kotok	Volodymyr Fysiuk
Ismene, sister of Antigone, daughter of Oedipus	soprano	Rosa Zanetti	Margharyta Bilokiz	Marharyta Bilokiz
Adrastus, wealthy Theban	male soprano	Pietro Muschietti	Stanislav Pashchuk	Vasyl Ponayda
Eteocles and Polynices, sons of Oedipus	non-singing roles			
Priests, Warriors	non-singing roles			
Thebes Citizens	chorus			
Scenographers		Mauri (sisters)		Andrii Aleksandrovych-Dochevskyi
Costume designer		Antonio Dian		Hanna Dukhovychna
Choreography - ballet		Giuseppe Canciani		Sofiia Safriuk

== Publication of the Score and Sheet Music Materials ==
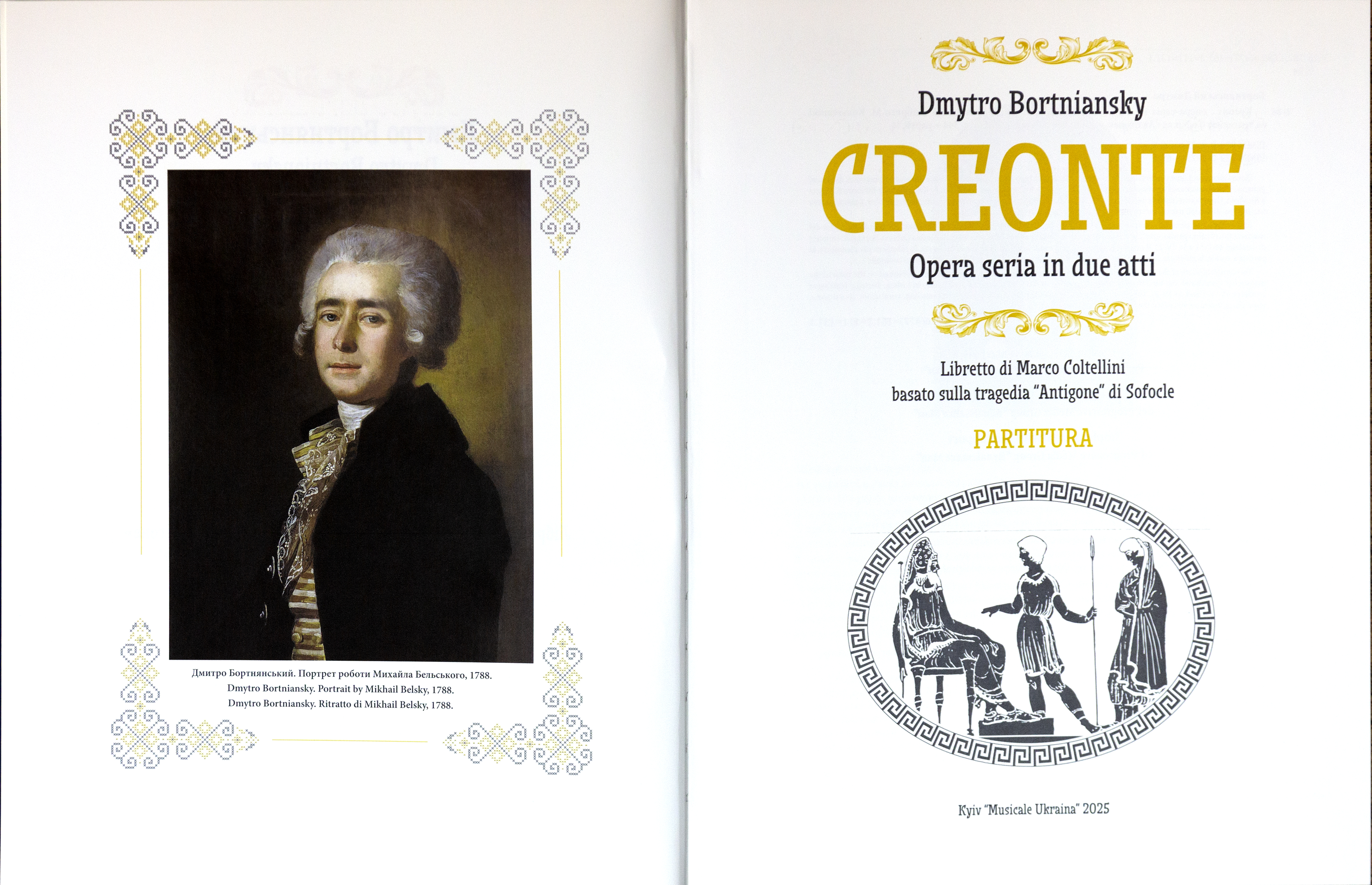
Frontispiece and title page of the printed score of Dmytro Bortniansky's opera “Creonte”, published by “Musical Ukraine”, 2025.

On October 8, 2025, Dmytro Bortniansky's opera Creonte was finally returned to humanity. On this day, the State Specialized Publishing House "Muzychna Ukraina" (Musical Ukraine) released the complete orchestral score of the opera, along with the full set of performance materials: piano reduction, orchestral parts, vocal parts, and choral score (ISMN 979-0-707540-68-8, ISMN 979-0-707540-69-5). The score and piano reduction were published in three languages: Ukrainian, Italian, and English.

This publication is the result of extensive scholarly and editorial work carried out by a dedicated team of researchers, preceding the opera's stage premiere. The preparation of the edition involved restoring the composer's original text from archival sources, comparing it with the Italian libretto by Marco Coltellini, and creating a modern musical layout suitable for both concert and theatrical performance.

The printed edition of Creonte represents an important step toward returning Dmytro Bortniansky's musical legacy to the global cultural space. Thanks to the official release of the score, the work can now be performed by professional ensembles in Ukraine and abroad, and is accessible for study by musicologists, conductors, and students of music institutions.

== Studio Audio Recording ==
In January 2026, despite the challenging conditions caused by blackouts, low temperatures, and a lack of heating, the studio audio recording of the opera was completed. The artistic team remained unchanged from the 2024 World Premiere in Kyiv: the National Presidential Orchestra of Ukraine; the National Honoured Academic Chapel of Ukraine «DUMKA»; Antigone - Olha Fomichova, People’s Artist of Ukraine; Creonte - Serhiy Bortnyk, soloist of the National Philharmonic of Ukraine; Haemon, Danylo Kotok, soloist of the Kyiv Opera; Ismene - Marharyta Bilokiz, winner of international competitions; and Adrastus - Stanislav Pashchuk, Soloist of the Kyiv Municipal Academic Opera and Ballet theater.

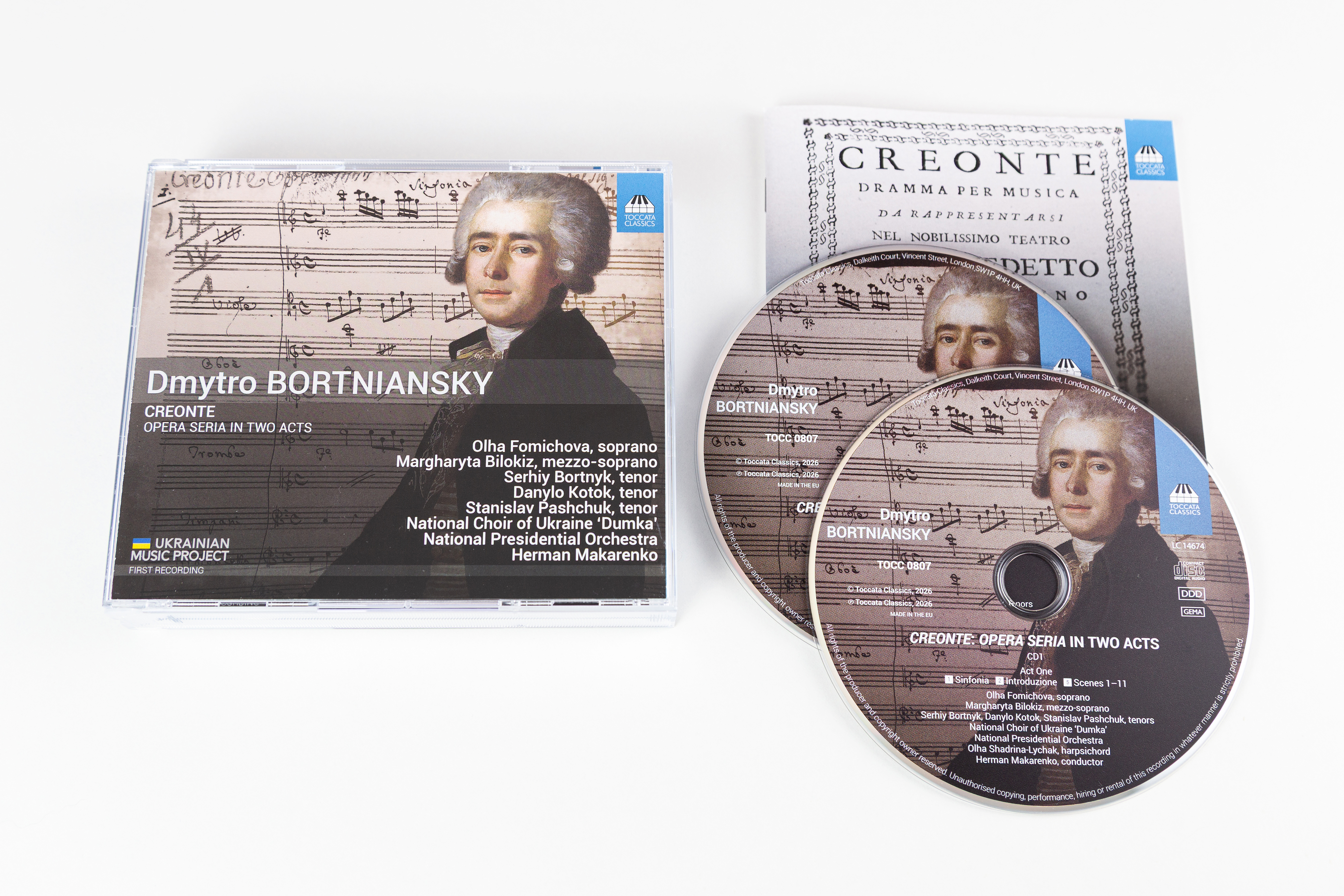
Compact disc featuring the first studio recording of Dmytro Bortniansky's opera “Creonte”

The recording was made thanks to the project organizers, the team of the L.I. Medved's Research Center, headed by Professor Mykola Prodanchuk, and the Charitable Organisation – the Global Harmony Art Foundation, which is an official partner of UNESCO.

The recording was conducted under the direction of People’s Artist of Ukraine Herman Makarenko, with sound engineer – Honored Art Worker of Ukraine Andriy Mokrytskyi.

Subsequently, the recording company Toccata Classics (United Kingdom) released a double compact disc containing recordings of both acts of the opera. PDF Thanks to worldwide distribution by Naxos Records, Creonte has reached listeners on every continent and is now available on leading streaming platforms, including Spotify, Apple Music, YouTube Music, Deezer, Amazon Music, and others.

The first studio recording of Creonte has received positive reviews from the international music community.
