= Faucon =

Faucon (French: Falcon) may refer to:

== French communes ==
- Faucon, Vaucluse
- Faucon-de-Barcelonnette, Alpes-de-Haute-Provence
- Faucon-du-Caire, Alpes-de-Haute-Provence
- Aunou-le-Faucon, Orne
- Saint-Julien-le-Faucon, Calvados
- Villers-Faucon, Somme

== Other ==
- Bernard Faucon (born 1950), French photographer and writer
- Philippe Faucon (born 1958), French film director, screenwriter and producer
- Le Faucon (film), a 1983 film by Tunisian director Paul Boujenah
- Le faucon (opera), a 1786 opera by the Russian composer Dmitry Bortniansky
- French ship Faucon
- Faucon, a French ship which sank off Formentera, Balearic Islands in 1673
