= Zaporozhian March (Lysenko) =

1905 piano composition by Mykola Lysenko

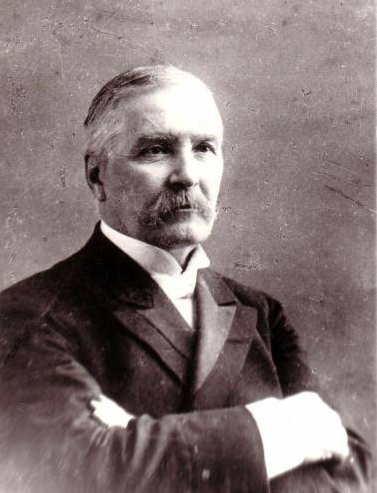
Mykola Lysenko in c. 1900

Zaporozhian March (Ukrainian: Запорозький марш) is a piano composition written by Ukrainian composer Mykola Lysenko in 1905 and first published in 1908.

== Text ==
Lyrics to the melody were added by Lysenko's close friend, Volodymyr Samiilenko. Initially banned by Tsarist censorship, Samiilenko's text was first published in 1958.

Original Text

Гей, за наш рідний край
Станьмо разом, за Вкраїну,
За наш тихий, любий рай,
За її свободу, за добро народу
Будем до загину сміливо іти.
Всяк знеможений, переможений,
Всяк, хто в ярмі цілий вік конав, –
Уставайте, поспішайте!
День ясної долі вже засіяв.
Нумо до праці святої, брати,
Сміливо будемо йти.

Translation:
Translation

Hey, for our native land
Let's stand together, for Ukraine,
For our quiet, lovely heaven,
For her freedom, for people's good
We will go on bravely till we perish.
Everyone who is tired, defeated,
Everyone who spent all his life in yoke –
Rise up, hurry up!
The day of bright future is shining already.
Now to our holy work, brothers,
We will go on bravely.

== Modern use ==
Lysenko's Zaporozhian March performed by Andriy Bondarenko

In independent Ukraine, the tune was arranged by Viktor Hutsal. In 2016 it was adopted as a parade military march by the Armed Forces of Ukraine.
