= Andriy Bondarenko =

Ukrainian composer and pianist

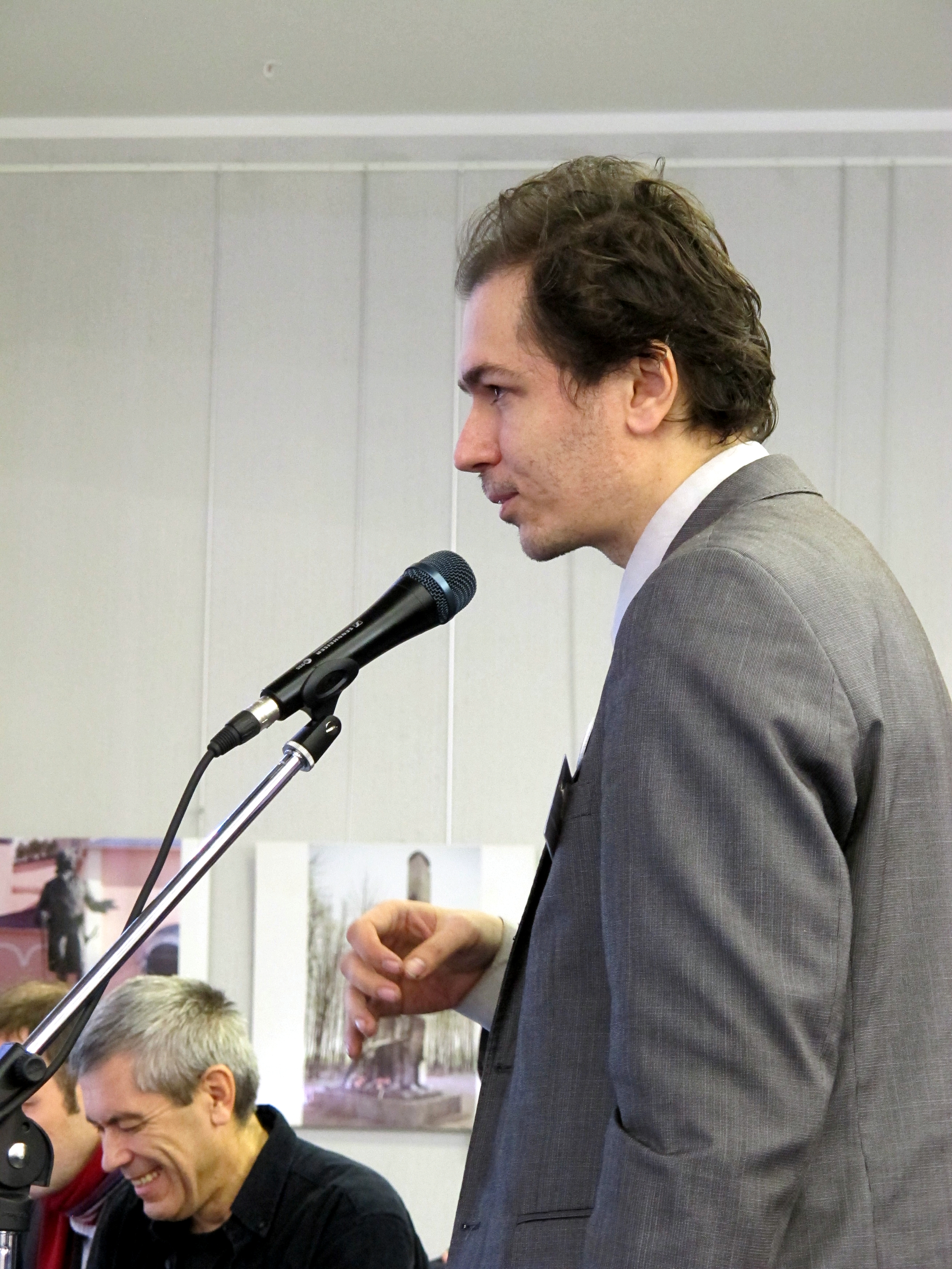
- Andriy Bondarenko in Smolensk Wiki-Conference 2013
- Born: Андрі́й І́горович Бондаре́нко; 22 June 1978 (age 48)
- Era: 21st century

Andriy Ihorovych Bondarenko (born 22 June 1978 in Brovary) is a Ukrainian composer and pianist.

== Early life ==
Bondarenko received his musical education at the Lysenko Special Music school in Kyiv, and at the National Musical Academy of Ukraine.

== Career ==
Bondarenko won prizes in Rachmaninov (Tambov, Russia, 1996), Horovitz (Kyiv, 1997), Lysenko (Kyiv, 1997) international competitions. He collaborates with the “New music in Ukraine” ensemble. He played at festivals KyivMusicFest, Two Days and Two Nights of New Music.

A. Bondarenko "Anthem of Wikipedia», 2016

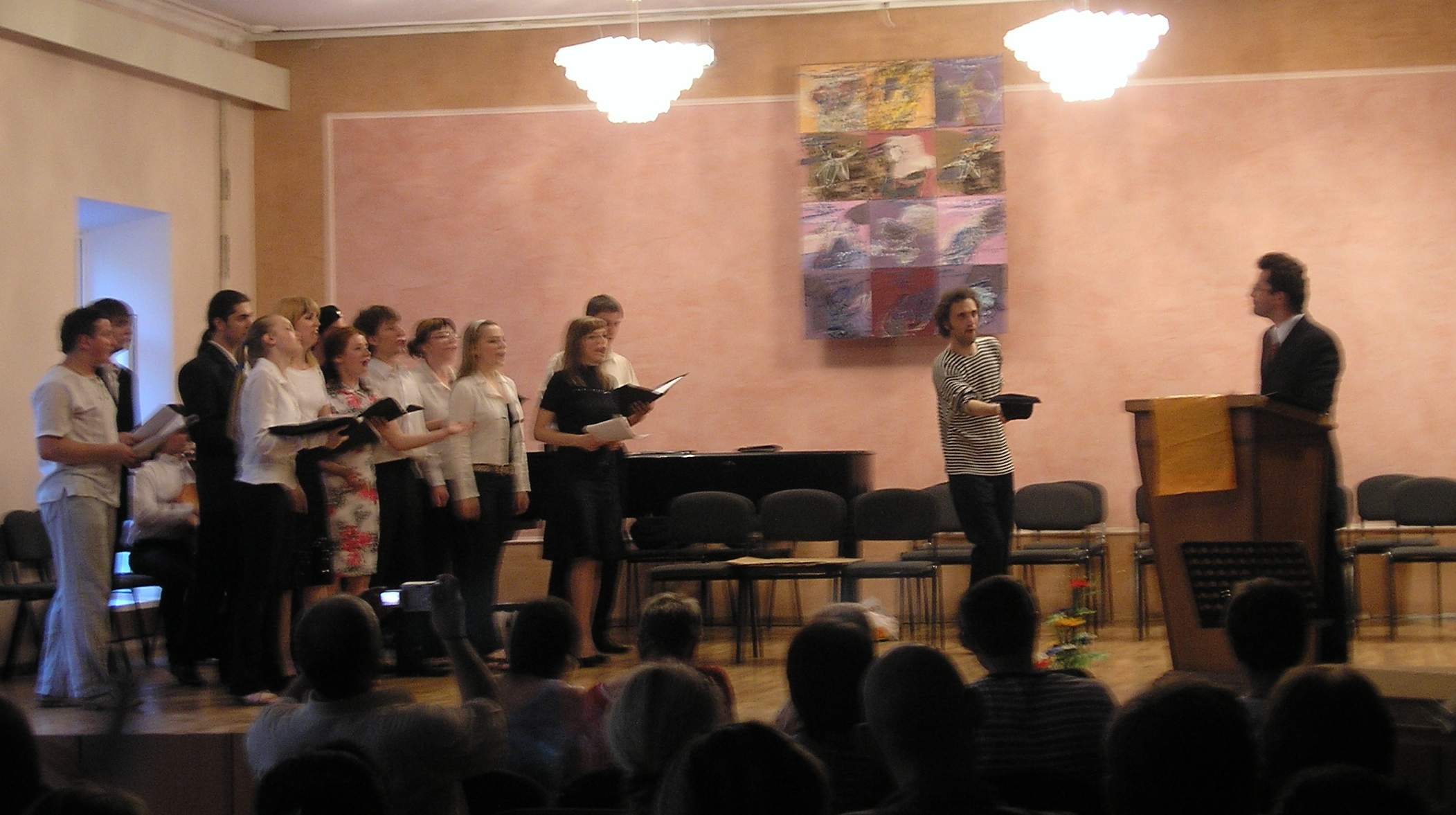
A. Bondarenko "Paradise in Ukrainian», 2006

His compositions won prizes in the I&M Kotz composer competition (Kyiv,1994) and the International composer's competition in St. Petersburg (2003). Among his compositions – symphonic poem 2004 was devoted to the Orange revolution. Four children's ballets were performed by Releve choreographic ensemble with Master Class corporation's assistance in 2009. A DVD Cours de danse contemporaine by Irena Tatiboit, a set of arrangements written for Kchreshchatyk academic chamber choir.

In 2006-2011 Bondarenko worked in National Academy of Government Managerial Staff of Culture and Arts as a teacher of music informatics. He published a Textbook Musical Informatics, the first Ukrainian textbook devoted to the theory of digital sound and music software.

In 2009 Bondarenko was a co-founder of Wikimedia Ukraine, a regional partner of the Wikimedia Foundation. He wrote articles in Ukrainian Wikipedia, mostly devoted to music and musicians. He is the author of Anthem of Wikipedia - a piece for a soloist, vocal and instrumental ensembles. He performed it on January 15, 2016 at a concert devoted to the 15th anniversary of Wikipedia. It was first published on YouTube.

In 2012 he started the project World Classics in Ukrainian. The project aimed to popularize Ukrainian translations of world classical vocal music. Bondarenko organized 9 concerts of Ukrainian-translated vocal music, including a premiere performance of Dido & Aeneas by Henry Purcell in a Ukrainian translation by Olena O`Lir and The First World classics in Ukrainian Vocal Contest. The klavier of the opera Le faucon by Dmitry Bortnianski with Ukrainian translation by M. Strikha was prepared by Bondarenko as a part of this project.

== Printed works ==
- Бондаренко А. І., Шульгіна В. Д. Музична інформатика: навч. посіб./А. І. Бондаренко, В. Д. Шульгіна — К.:НАКККІМ, 2011. — 190 с. ISBN 978-966-452-068-0
- Бондаренко А. І. Нотні редактори Finale та Sibelius. Досвід порівняння. // Мистецтвознавчі записки: Зб. наук. праць — К., "Мілленіум», 2006 — с.66-74
- Бондаренко А. І. До проблеми взаємодії музики різних типів. Спільні риси творчості В.Сильвестрова та музичного напрямку Ембієнт // Музика в інформаційному суспільстві: збірник наукових статей / [упорядник І. Б. Пясковський]. — К., 2008.- с. 76-86
- Бондаренко А. І. До проблеми термінології у класифікації популярної музики за жанрами, стилями та напрямками // Мистецтвознавчі записки: Зб. наук. праць, Вип. 19 — К., 2011
- Андрій Бондаренко. Гайдамацькі пісні про Івана Бондаренка на Макарівщині. Музикознавчий огляд. // Макарівські історико-краєзнавчі читання: збірник текстів виступів на історико-краєзнавчій конференції (смт Макарів Київської області 25 листопада 2011) — Київ: Видававець О. В. Пугач, 2012. — Сторінки 48-52. ISBN 978-966-8359-10-1
- Бондаренко А. І. Виявлення і аналіз акустичних подій в електронній музиці (на прикладі "мотус» А. Загайкевич) // Питання культурології: зб. наук. праць. Вип. 31 / М-во освіти і науки України, М-во культури України, Київ.нац.ун-т культури і мистецтв. — Київ: Видав. центр КНУКіМ,2015. — с.22-29
- Бондаренко А. І. Ватний симфонізм, як домінанта музичної культури окупованого Донбасу. // Донецький вісник Наукового товариства ім. Шевченка. — Т. 43. — Донецьк, 2017. — с.195-202
- Bondarenko A. (2020) Ukrainian lectronic music in globalisation and national revival. Scientific Journal of Polonia University 43 (6), 9-15
