= Bust of Antinous (Gatchina Palace) =

Roman marble sculptural portrait

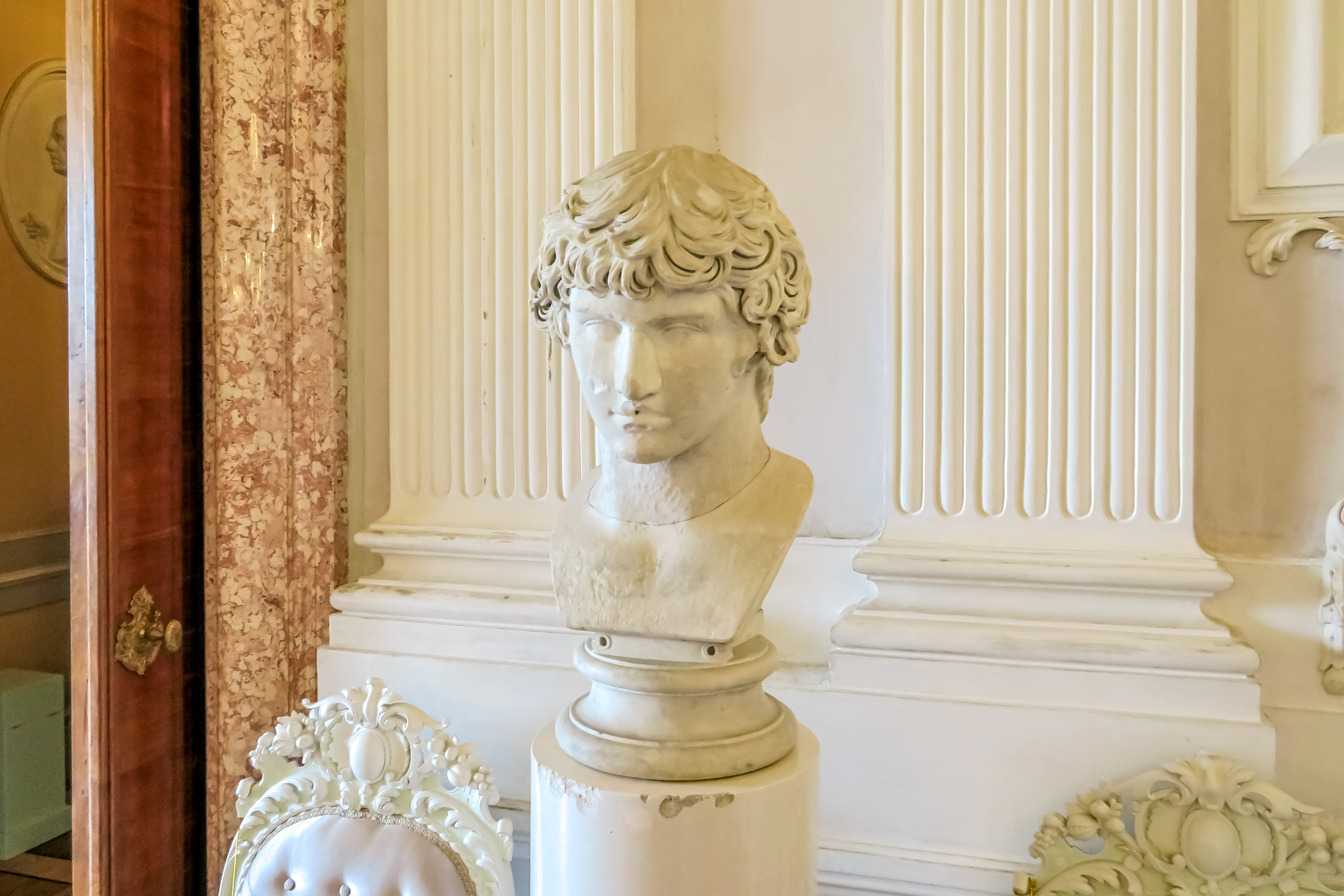
- Year: 2nd century AD.
- Medium: Marble sculpture
- Location: Gatchina Palace, Saint Petersburg

The bust of Antinous in the White Hall of the Great Gatchina Palace is an ancient Roman marble sculptural portrait of Antinous, the favorite and beloved of the Roman emperor Hadrian. The bust was created after the tragic death of the young man in 130 as one of many similar portraits as part of his posthumous cult. he sculpture was found by Gavin Hamilton during the excavations of Hadrian's Villa in Tivoli. Later the bust was bought by Ivan Shuvalov. Under Emperor Paul I of Russia, the bust became part of an allegorical composition preceding the entrance to the Throne Hall of the Gatchina Palace.

In the White Hall there is another image of Antinous - a statue in the image of Osiris made of black marble. It is a copy of the 18th century from an antique statue of the 2nd century AD., found at Hadrian's Villa in Tivoli and now kept in the Vatican Egyptian Museum.
