= Kyiv Classic Orchestra =

The Kyiv Classic Orchestra is a non-governmental orchestra based in Kyiv, Ukraine. Its current conductor and music director is Herman Makarenko. The orchestra is administered by The Kyiv Classic Corporation. The French agency NS (Nord Service) Organisation administered the orchestra's international tour in 2006.

The orchestra, which ranges in size from 10 to 12 players chamber orchestra to 60 players symphony orchestra, usually performs at The National Opera of Ukraine or The National House of Organ and Chamber Music of Ukraine. In 2006 the orchestra travelled to France, Belgium, and Italy. On 9 March 2022, as Russian forces advanced on Kyiv during the Russo-Ukrainian War, members of the orchestra played a short concert in Independence Square.
