= French ship Faucon =

Several ships of the French navy have borne the name Faucon:

- Faucon (1638), broken up in 1661
- Faucon (1674), broken up in 1708
- Faucon (1728), a brig
- Faucon (1759), a cutter
- French destroyer Faucon (1887), a destroyer, withdrawn from service 1920

== See also ==
- Faucon (disambiguation)
