= Birch Gate =

Coordinates: 59°34′10.6″N 30°6′49.3″E

- Берёзовые воро́та
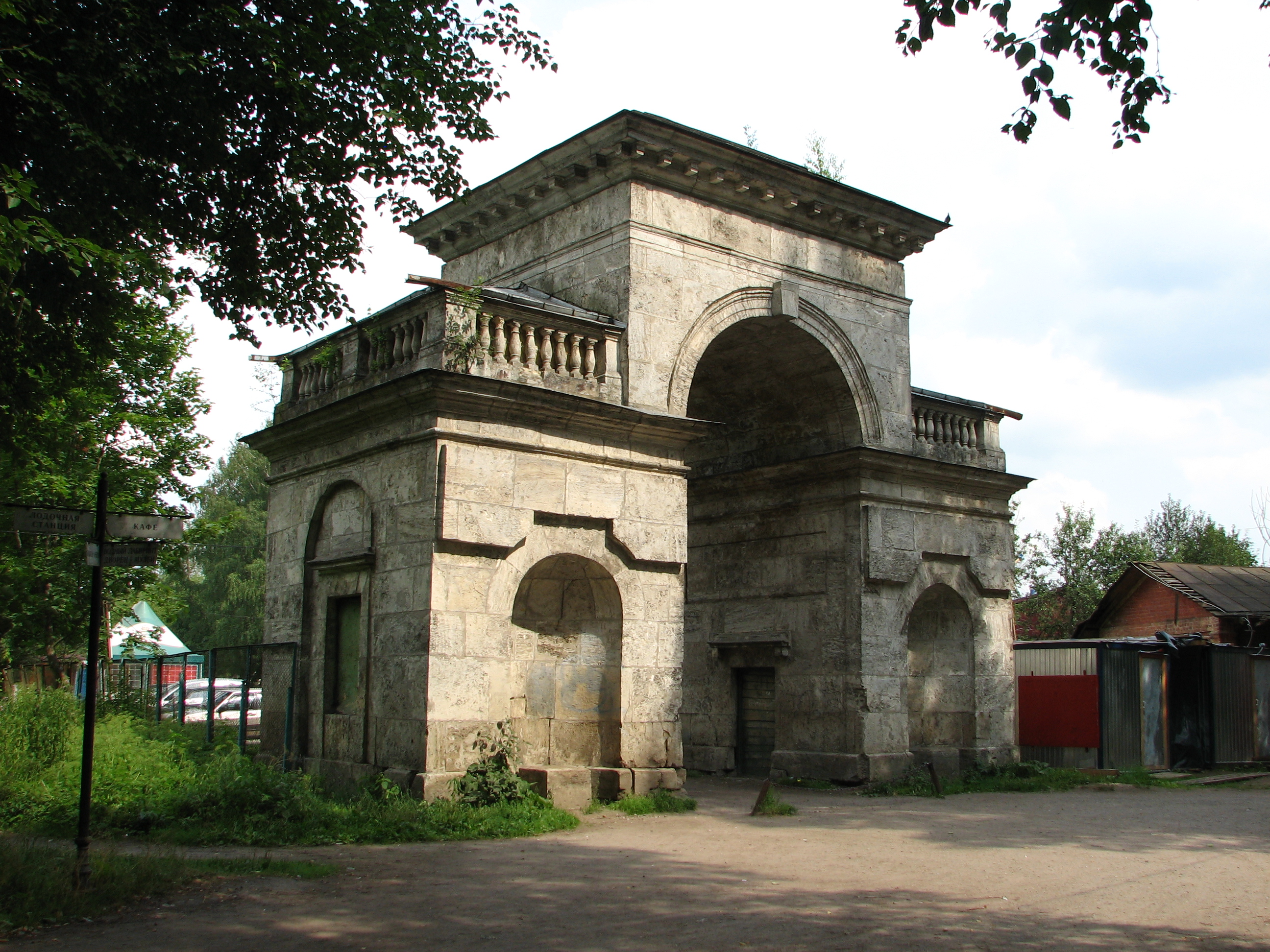
- View from right side of gate, 2010
- Interactive map of the Birch Gate area
- Alternative names: Berezoviye Gate, Berezoviy Gate

General information
- Type: Gate
- Location: Ulitsa K.podryadchikova, 2, Gatchina, Leningrad Oblast, Russia, 188308, Gatchina, Russia
- Construction started: 1795
- Completed: 1798

Design and construction
- Architect: Vincenzo Brenna

The Birch Gate (Berezoviye Gate, Russian: Берёзовые ворота) is a stone gate located on the eastern border of the Palace Park, the grounds of Gatchina Palace, in Gatchina, Leningrad Oblast, Russia. It is nearby the Birch House (Березовый домик). The facility was built from 1795 to 1798 by Giovanni Visconti according to the design of famous architect Vincenzo Brenna. The Birch Gate is a part of the Historic Centre of Saint Petersburg and Related Groups of Monuments, a UNESCO World Heritage Site.

== Design ==
Unique in architectonics among the parks of the suburbs of St. Petersburg, the Birch Gates serve as the eastern entrance to the Palace Park. The gates are an entrance to one of the parts of the Palace Park, the English Garden, forming, together with the Birch House complex and the adjacent territory, a conditional site called "Birch".

There are three parts in the composition of the gate. The main body of the structure is created by two symmetrical, rectangular pavilions (guardhouses), playing the role of pylons supporting the upper tier of the gate and framing a high arched passage. The middle part of the gate is raised above the side pylons and is cut through by a through arch. The upper part of the pavilions is crowned with cornices and platforms located above, surrounded by attic walls with carved stone balusters . The design of the gate gives the impression of a vault resting on the cornices of the pylons.

There are small, square guard rooms inside the pylons with entrances from under the passage arch, covered with vaults and illuminated by windows on the end facades of the gates. A light and elegant archivolt above the gate arch is cut by a powerful keystone. There are semi-circular niches at the front of the gate intended to house statues, but the statues were never finished and the niches remain empty.

=== Central construction ===
The dominant part of the gate is the upper tier, which sets the total height of the gate at 41.6 feet (12.7 meters). The lower part of the facade of the central part contains an arched span with a profiled archivolt crowned with a keystone. The upper part of the facade ends with a classical entablature with a cornice resting on 48 stone brackets running along the entire perimeter of the upper tier. The central part of the gate sets the height of the passage, which is 29.5 feet (9.0 meters).

=== Side pylons ===
The guardhouses are more saturated with decorative elements. The lower parts of the pavilions stands out with a small plinth. On the front sides of the guardhouses there are deep semicircular niches. The figured edge of the relief panel, located in the upper part of the pavilions, protrudes above the niches. Even higher is the classical entablature, covering all four sides of each of the guardhouses. The window openings of the side facades of the gates are rectangular in shape and are inscribed in semicircular recesses. The window trims are straight and end with profiled sandriks in the upper part. The doorways located under the arch contain embossed sandriks in the upper part, supported by brackets. Even higher is a panel surrounded by a recessed rectangular frame.

The pylons end with platforms surrounded by a balustrade and have a total height of 26.2 feet (8.0 meters). They are covered with iron roofing.

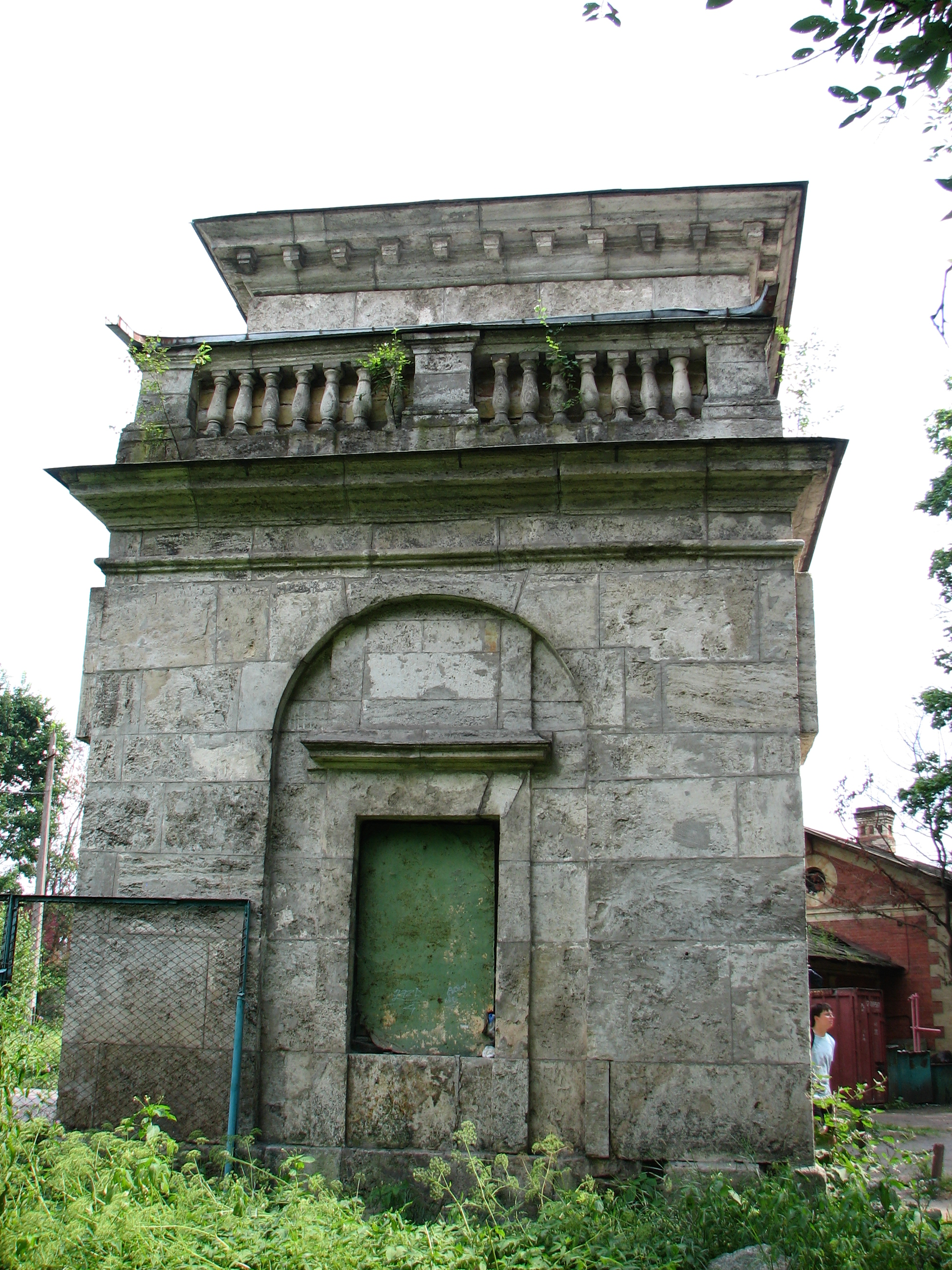
Side facade of the pylon

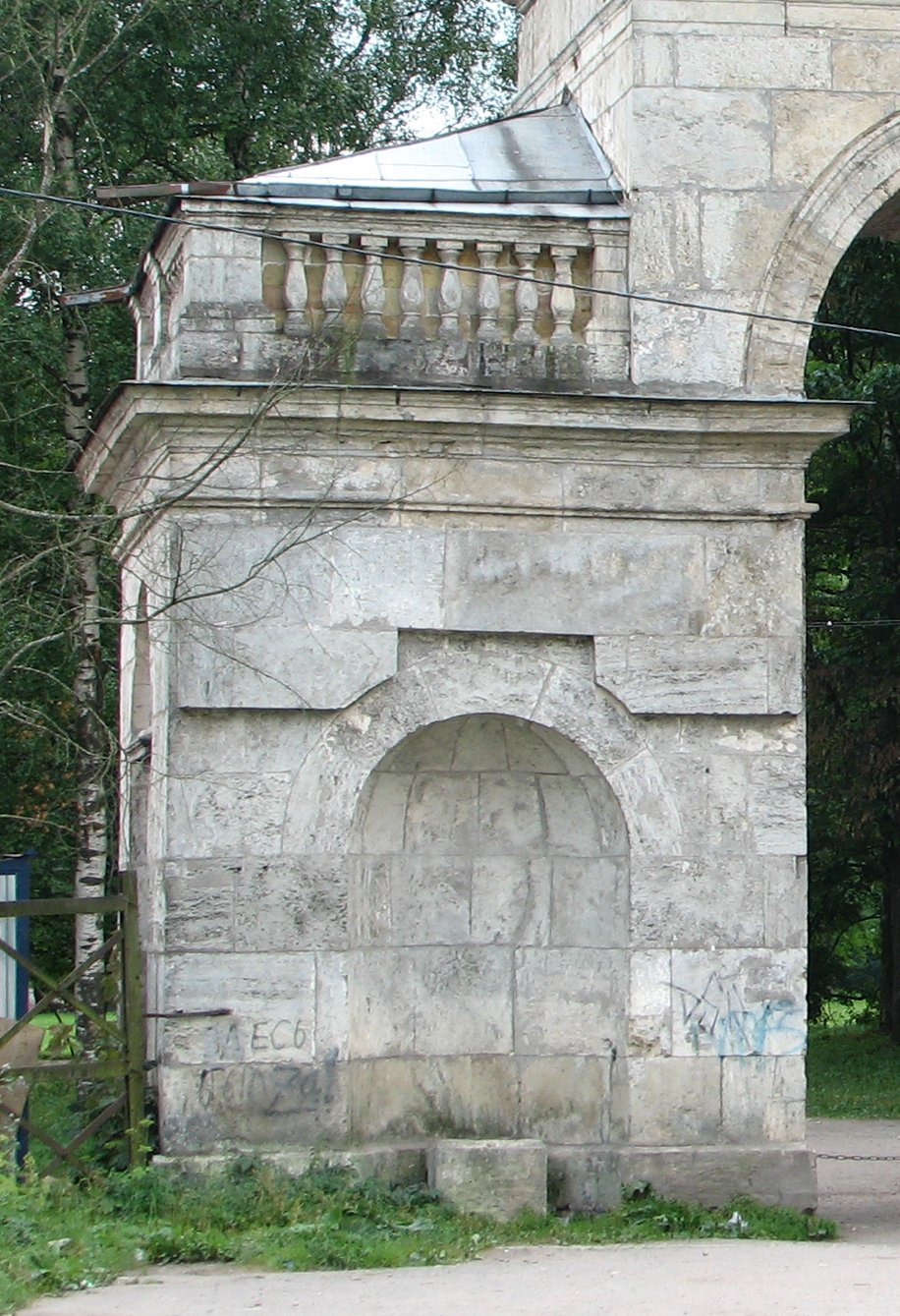
The main facade of the pylon with a niche for the statue

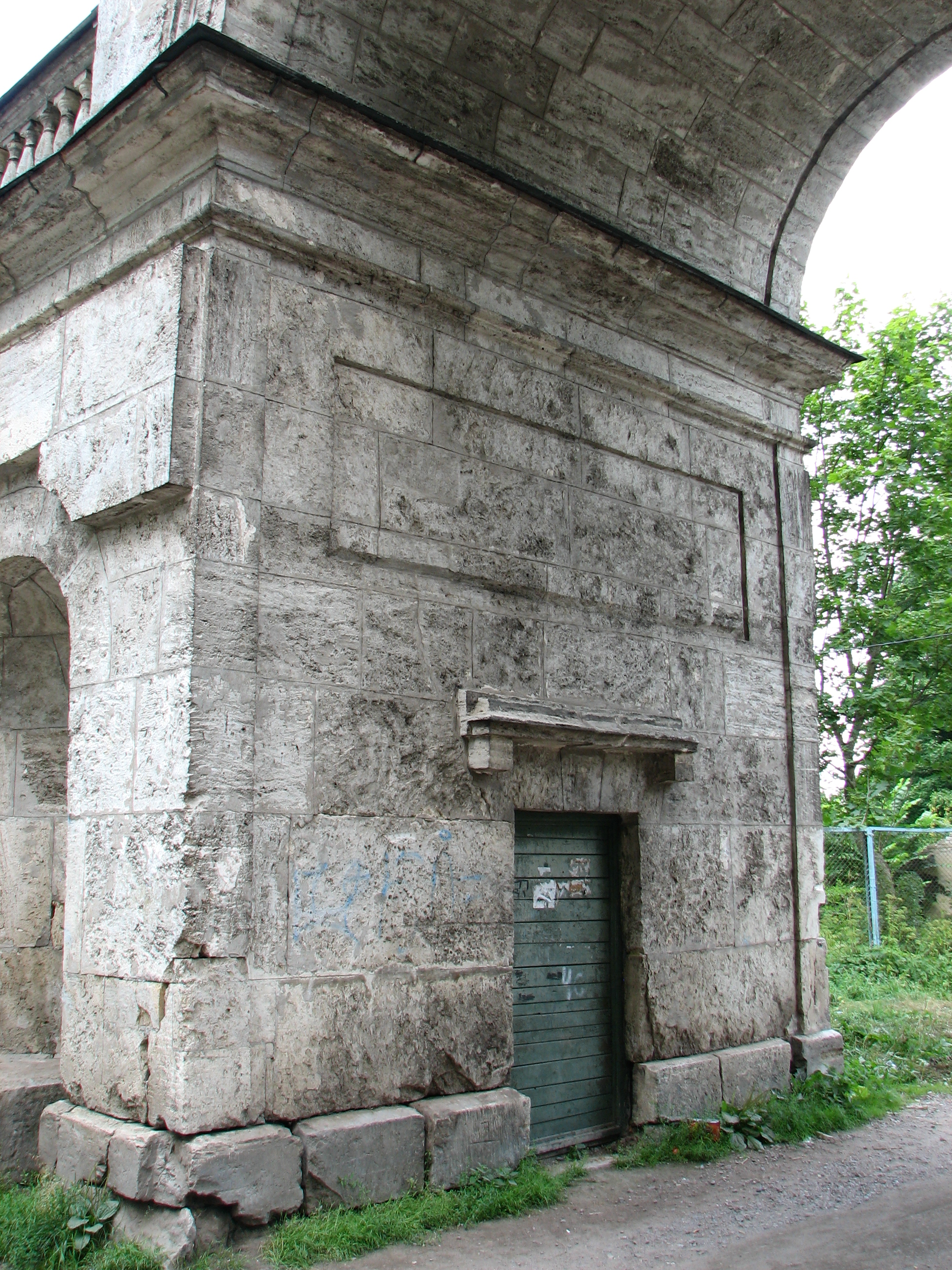
Passage arch

=== Composition and interpretation ===
The chosen architectural structure of the gate references Ancient Roman classical architecture. The structure leaves the impression of triumph and monumentality, achieved due to the general proportions of the structure and the ratio of its individual parts. Equal height and width of the structure give a feeling of inviolability and stability, the monumentality of the structure is emphasized by a narrow arch in relation to the pylons, as if sandwiched between the massive pavilions.

Individual elements of the gate also play an important role in the perception of the entire structure. A picturesque and expressive play of light and shadow is provided by both niches deeply embedded in the array of pylons and far-reaching cornices. The created effect is emphasized by relief panels on the planes of the walls of the building. A characteristic feature of the gate is the combination of the elegance of some elements with the expressiveness of others; thus, the archivolt of the arch ends with a monumental capstone.

The texture and color of the gate is provided by the Pudost stone, named for Pudost Village near Gatchina. The stone blocks accentuate the architectonics of the structure, creating a rhythmic articulation of its individual elements - friezes, panels, reinforcing the opposition of load-bearing and carried structures and visually emphasizing the elasticity and structure of the span.

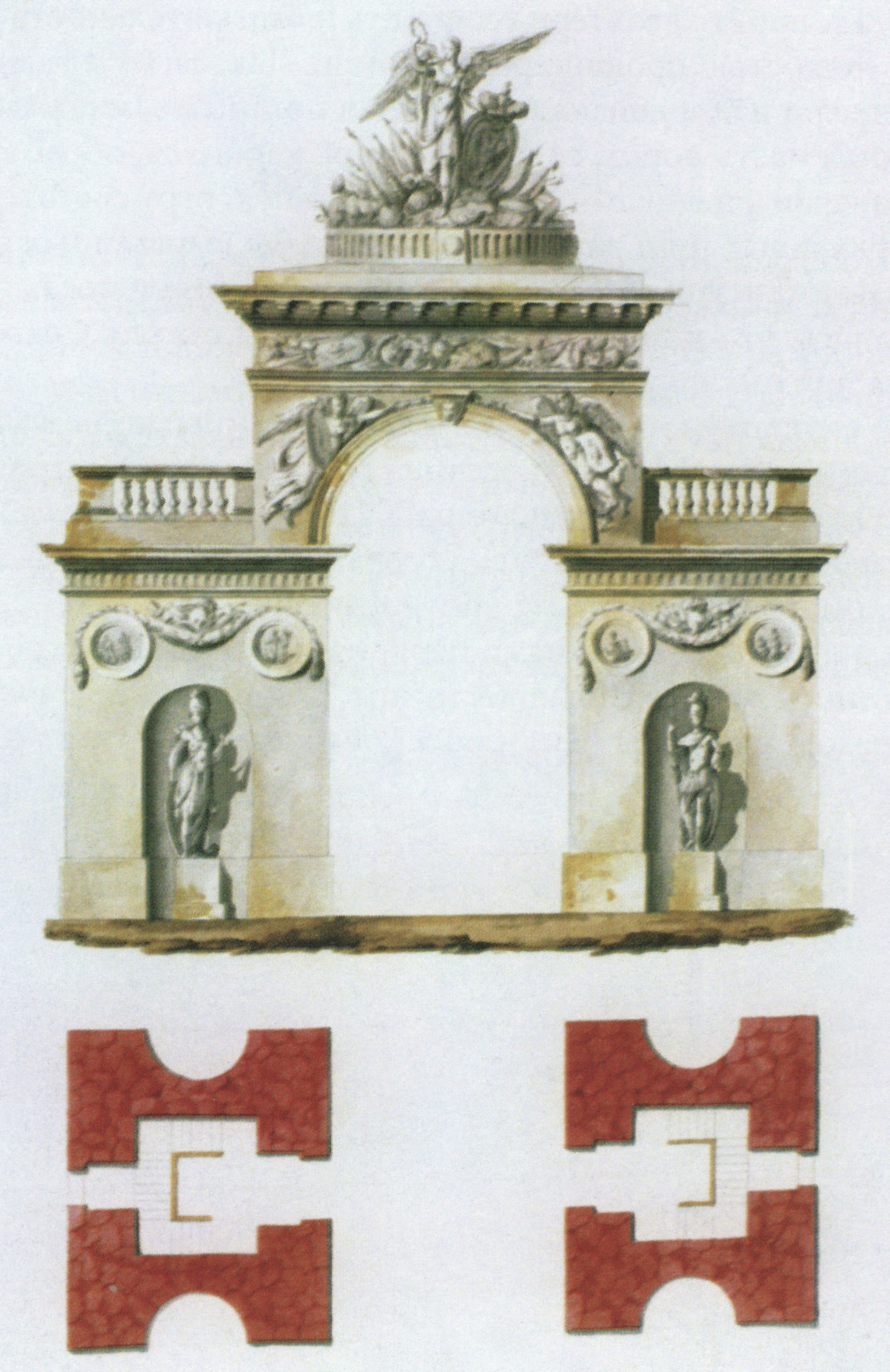
Plans for the gate, circa 1790s

=== Unfulfilled architectural plans ===
Plans for the Birch Gate dating back to the 1790s have been preserved. The most prominent difference between the plans for the gate and the actual construction is the presence of additional sculptures. There were plans to install sculptures of deities, the Roman patrons of the war Mars and Bellona, for which pedestals were preserved in the niches. Above the niches, instead of figured panels, there were meant to be sculptural medallions connected with garlands. Above the arched vault, the drawing shows bas-reliefs of flying geniuses of victory, in the upper part of the pylons there are grooves, and on the keystone there is a relief mask (similar plots were made on some gates of St. Frieze- compositions from captured antique weapons). The gate was to be crowned by a sculptural composition of the goddess Nike on an oval pedestal, towering above the banners and “trophies”, holding a shield with the emblem of the Russian Empire in her left hand and carrying a laurel wreath in her right hand. According to the tradition of stone craftsmen, the curly panels that exist now were left to implement the ideas for decorating the gate right on the spot, but this did not happen.

Despite the fact that the project was not fully implemented, many researchers agree that the Birch Gate is one of the most successful Brenna buildings in Gatchina's Palace Park.

== History ==
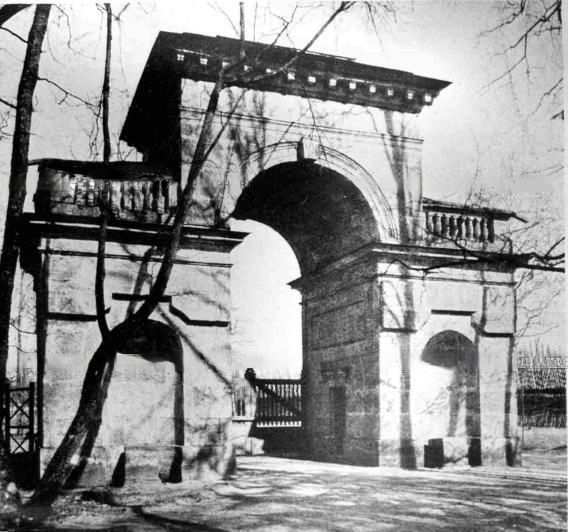
Birch Gates, circa 1900s

The birch gates were built in 1795-1798 according to the design of the architect Vincenzo Brenna. The gate was built by the stone master Giovanni Visconti. The contract for the construction of “a gate made of Pudov stone in the English garden near the Birch House” was concluded on January 24, 1795, with the local merchant Martyan Vorobyov (according to other sources, Mokei Fedorovich Vorobyov). On April 30, 1975, local builder Kiryan Platinin, known for participating in the construction of many Gatchina sights, was involved in the construction. The builders were told that the gates be built by September 1, 1795 "in the place shown from the purest pudovsky stone", but the extraction and processing of the stone was delayed until 1797. By the end of that year, the construction of the gate itself was already completed, although the decoration of the exterior continued until April 1798, when they were finally completed.

The upper fenced areas of the guardhouses were planned and used as one of the observation points for viewing Palace Park- they offered a view of the area of the park adjacent to the gate and the expanse of the White Lake.

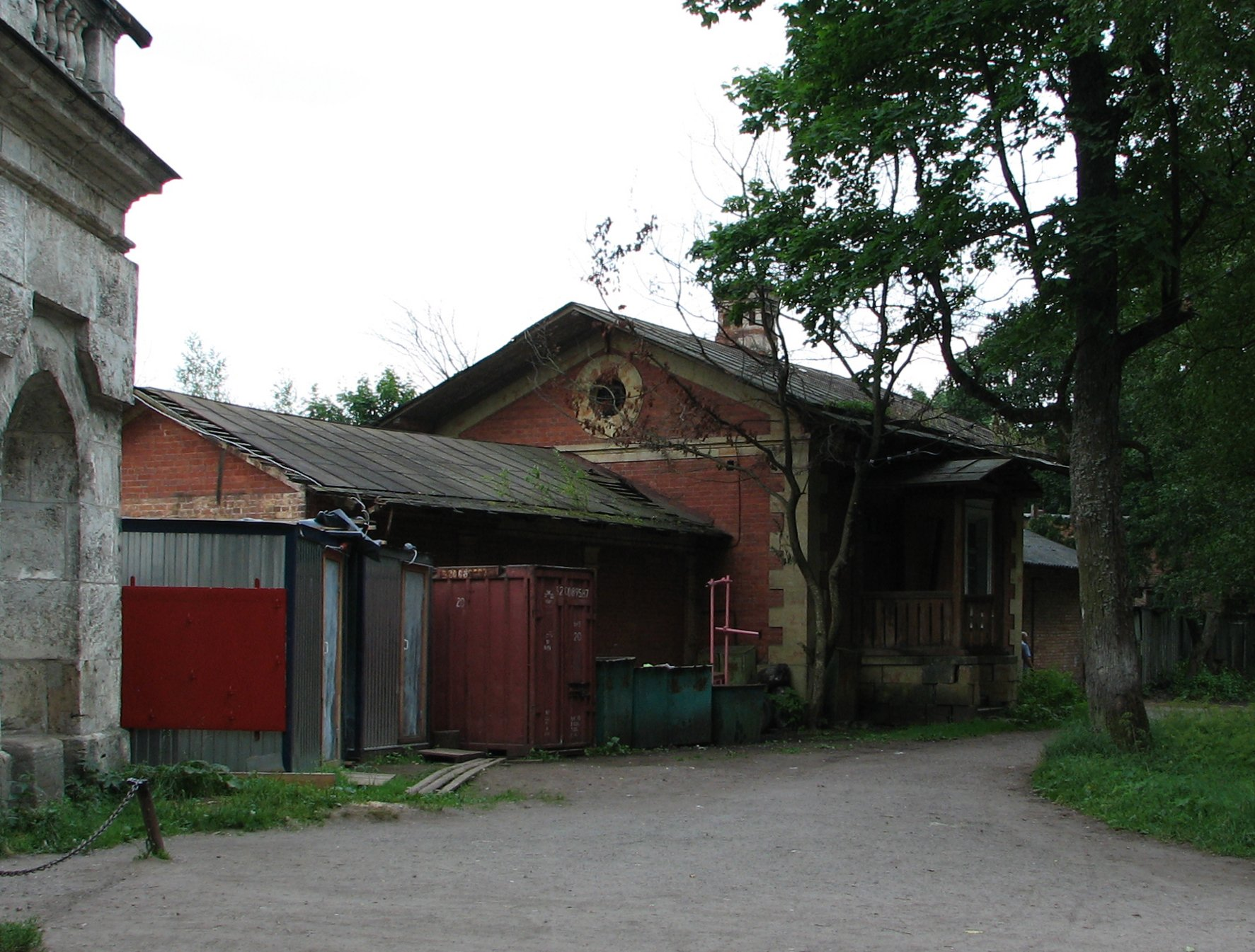
Guardhouse near the gate

In 1843, the platforms above the side pavilions were covered with iron roofing, which changed the general appearance of the gate. Simultaneously, the stairs leading from the interior of the gate to the observation platforms in the upper part of the guardhouses were also demolished, and the premises themselves began to be used as a warehouse for garden tools.

In 1881, according to architect Ludwig Frantsevich Shperer, guardhouses made of red brick were erected next to the gates of the Palace Park, including next to the Birch Gates.

Initially, the gate was called "The Gate to the Birch House" («ворота у Берёзового домика») because it was nearby the previously built Birch House. In the middle of the 19th century, its name changed to "Big Stone Gate" («Большие каменные ворота»), and now their generally accepted name is "Birch Gates".

After the Great Patriotic War, restoration and conservation work was carried out on the gates.
