= 8549 Alcide =

Main-belt asteroid

Discovery
- Discovered by: Farra d'Isonzo Obs. (inc. Luciano Bittesini)
- Discovery site: Farra d'Isonzo Obs.
- Discovery date: 30 March 1994

Designations
- Named after: Alcide Bittesini (father of co-discoverer)
- Alternative designations: 1994 FS
- Minor planet category: main-belt · Nysa–Polana complex

Orbital characteristics
- Epoch 4 September 2017 (JD 2458000.5)
- Uncertainty parameter 0
- Observation arc: 23.31 yr (8,514 days)
- Aphelion: 2.8912 AU
- Perihelion: 1.9828 AU
- Semi-major axis: 2.4370 AU
- Eccentricity: 0.1864
- Orbital period (sidereal): 3.80 yr (1,390 days)
- Mean anomaly: 318.71°
- Mean motion: 0° 15^{m} 32.76^{s} / day
- Inclination: 1.8790°
- Longitude of ascending node: 205.61°
- Argument of perihelion: 64.719°

Physical characteristics
- Dimensions: 4.19 km (calculated); 4.341±0.076 km
- Synodic rotation period: 3 h
- Geometric albedo: 0.196±0.012; 0.21 (assumed)
- Spectral type: S
- Absolute magnitude (H): 14.2 · 14.3±0.4 (R) · 14.73±0.25

8549 Alcide, provisional designation 1994 FS, is a stony asteroid from the inner regions of the asteroid belt, approximately 4.2 kilometers in diameter. It was discovered on 30 March 1994, by a group of amateur astronomers at the Farra d'Isonzo Observatory, Italy, near the border to Slovenia. It was named for Alcide Bittesini, father of co-discoverer Luciano Bittesini.

== Orbit and classification ==
Alcide is a member of the stony subgroup of the Nysa–Polana complex, a collection of overlapping asteroid families. The body orbits the Sun in the inner main-belt at a distance of 2.0–2.9 astronomical units (AU) once every 3 years and 10 months (1,390 days). Its orbit has an eccentricity of 0.19 and an inclination of 2° with respect to the ecliptic. Precoveries were taken at Palomar and Steward Observatory (Kitt Peak) just weeks and days prior to the asteroid's official discovery observation at Farra d'Isonzo.

== Physical characteristics ==
=== Lightcurves ===
A rotational lightcurve of Alcide was obtained from photometric observations made by astronomer David Polishook at the ground-based Wise Observatory, Israel, in November 2007. The lightcurve gave a rotation period of 3 hours with a brightness amplitude of 0.2 magnitude (U=2-).

=== Diameter and albedo ===
According to the survey carried out by the NEOWISE mission of NASA's space-based Wide-field Infrared Survey Explorer, Alcide measures 4.3 kilometers in diameter and its surface has an albedo of 0.195, while the Collaborative Asteroid Lightcurve Link assumes a standard albedo for stony asteroids of 0.21 and calculates a diameter of 4.2 kilometers with an absolute magnitude of 14.2.

== Naming ==
This minor planet was named for Italian high-school teacher of natural sciences, Alcide Bittesini (1913–1981). He was the father of amateur astronomer Luciano Bittesini, who co-discovered the asteroid with his amateur colleagues at the Farra d'Isonzo Observatory in Italy.

At the age of 9, his father fostered his interest in astronomy, when they observed a comet with a homespun telescope made of a pair of glasses, a tin can and a microscope eyepiece. The official naming citation was published by the Minor Planet Center on 2 February 1999 (M.P.C. 33791).
