= Le faucon (opera) =

Elvira's aria from Le faucon (performed by Oksana Petrykova)

Le faucon (English: The Falcon, Russian: Сокол) is an opéra comique in three acts by the Ukrainian composer Dmitry Bortniansky with a French language libretto by Franz-Hermann Lafermière. It was first performed on 11 October 1786 at the Gatchina Palace in Russia by aristocratic amateur singers. The plot is borrowed from Boccaccio's The Decameron (Fifth Day, 9th tale) which also served as the basis for Pierre-Alexandre Monsigny's 1771 comic opera Le faucon (libretto by Michel-Jean Sedaine) (and later for Gounod's La colombe).

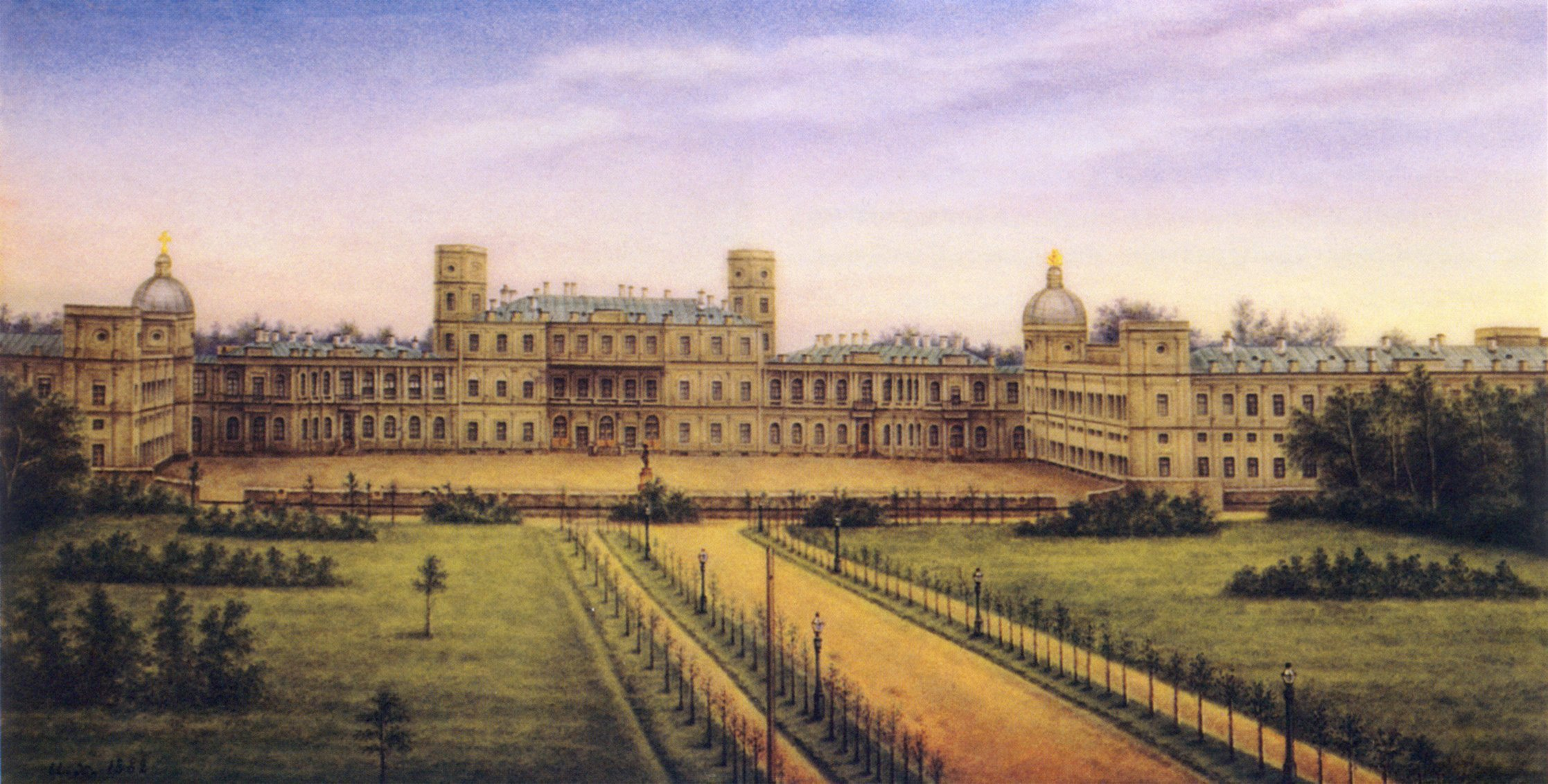
The Gatchina Palace, where Le faucon premiered in 1786

Two arias from the opera, "Le beau Tirsis" and "Adieu, Adieu", were published in a 1793 collection of songs by Bortniansky (Recueil de romances et chansons, St. Petersburg: Breitkopf). Although rarely performed in its entirety in modern times, Le faucon was revived as a chamber opera by Boris Pokrovsky at the Moscow Chamber Musical Theatre in 1979. Excerpts from the work were also performed at New York City's Avery Fisher Hall by the Choral Guild of Atlanta and the orchestra of the Metropolitan Opera in 1988. Maxim Strikha translated the libretto into Ukrainian in 1990. In this version the opera was premièred in Kyiv on 15 October 1995.

== Synopsis ==
Federigo's aria (in Ukrainian translation)

Act 1
Nobleman Federigo is in love with the lady Elvira. Elvira is a wealthy widow, concerned about the health of her son. To attract her attention, he spends almost all his funds, but does not succeed. In despair, he returns to his farm with faithful servant Pedrillo, who is in love with Elvira's servant, Marina. A comic scene with two doctors regarding Marina as ill instead of Elvira's son ends the first act.

Act 2
In his farm, Federigo is entertained by Pedrillo and the old soldier's daughter, Jeanette Gregoire. But they can not dispel his sadness. Suddenly, Elvira appears with Marina.

Jeanette's aria (Ukrainian translation by Maksym Rylsky)

Act 3
They are entertained with songs by Jeanette Gregoire. Finally the real cause of Elvira's visit is clarified. She wanted to ask Federigo's falcon to amuse her son. But Federigo confesses that he cooked it for the lunch having nothing else to prepare. Finally she is in love with Federigo, and they sing a love duet. The servants, Marina and Pedrillo, are also in love.

== Sources ==
- Holland, Bernard (16 February 1988). "Concert: Ukrainian Choral Music". The New York Times.
- Kuzma, Marika (2001). "Bortnyansky [Bortniansky], Dmytro Stepanovych [Bortnyansky, Dmitry Stepanovich]". In Stanley Sadie; John Tyrrell (eds.). The New Grove Dictionary of Music and Musicians. Grove's Dictionaries. Vol. 4 (2nd ed.). ISBN 1-56159-239-0.
- Ritzarev, Marina (2006). Eighteenth-century Russian Music. Ashgate Publishing. p. 178. ISBN 0-7546-3466-3.
- Théâtre international, Volumes 1–8 (1981). International Theatre Institute
- Vendrix, Philippe (1992). L'Opéra-comique en France au XVIIIè siècle. Editions Mardaga. p. 331. ISBN 2-87009-482-5.
