= Alcide (Bortniansky) =

1778 opera by Dmitry Bortniansky

Alcide or Alkides is a 1778 opera by Dmitry Bortniansky, first staged in Venice in 1778.

== Recording ==
Alcide – Bortniansky; Pasichnyk, Datsko, Zagorulko, Lviv Chamber Choir and Orchestra, conductor: Jean-Pierre Loré. EROL ER 98001(2 CDs), (1998).
