= HMS Alcide =

Three ships of the Royal Navy have borne the name HMS Alcide

- HMS Alcide (1755) was a 64-gun third rate ship of the line, captured from the French in 1755 and sold in 1772.
- HMS Alcide (1779) was a 74-gun third-rate ship of the line, launched in 1779 and broken up in 1817.
- HMS Alcide (P415) was an Amphion-class submarine launched in 1945 and sold in 1974.
