= Herman Makarenko =

Herman Makarenko Герман Макаренко
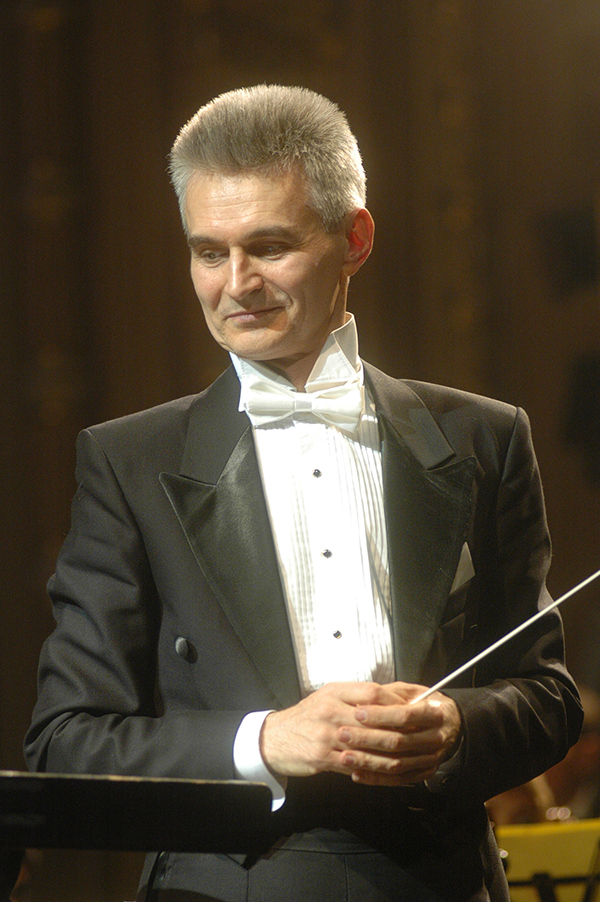

Background information
- Born: 29 June 1961 (age 65); Lviv, Ukraine
- Genres: Opera, ballet, symphonic music, chamber music
- Occupation: Conductor
- Website: www.kyivclassic.com

Herman Makarenko (born 29 June 1961, Ukraine) is the conductor of the National Academic Opera and Ballet Theatre of Ukraine named after Taras Shevchenko, the chief conductor and artistic director of the Kyiv Classic Orchestra, People's Artist of Ukraine, PhD, Doctor of Arts, Professor, Ambassador of the Ukrainian culture, became the first Ukrainian musician to be awarded the title of UNESCO Artist for Peace, Honorary citizen of the city of Kyiv, author and initiator of international projects, including those under the auspices of the UN and UNESCO, Head of the Viennese Balls Organizing Committee in Ukraine, the first performer and conductor of D. Bortnyansky's opera "Creonte" (world premiere on November 11, 2024, Kyiv).

The author of the annual exclusive projects – «Concert Premiere», «New Year Strauss Concert», «Declaration of Love», concerts dedicated to the 60th, 65th, 70th anniversaries of the UN, «Ukraine to China», an international project that brought together UNESCO Artists for Peace «Art Against a Pandemic», «Message of peace», and many others.

He has toured all over the world - United States, Canada, France, Italy, Iran, Russia, Cyprus, Czech Republic, Croatia, Slovakia, North Macedonia, Norway, Belgium, Serbia, China, Egypt, Kuwait, and others. Performed in prestigious concert halls of the world: UNESCO Headquarters Hall, the Madeleine Church Hall in Paris, Bedřich Smetana Hall in Prague, Cercle Royal Gaulois in Brussels, Cairo Opera House, Abdul Hussain Abdul Ridha Salmiya Theater, Guangzhou Opera House, Xiamen Opera House, etc.

Has recorded more than 15 CDs with works of Western European, Russian, Ukrainian composers (including full music for Tchaikovsky's ballets Swan Lake, Nutcracker, V. Gubarenko opera «Tenderness», and others).

Author of monographs – Music and Philosophy: Schopenhauer, Wagner, Nietzsche, The Conductor's Creative Work: the Dimensions of Aesthetics and Art History and a manual for students in higher education.

== Biography ==
Herman Makarenko was born on 29 June 1961 in the city of Lviv in the family of opera soloists - mother was a ballet soloist and father was an opera soloist (tenor).

«I was born behind the scenes of the opera, even the name was given to me in honor of the hero of "The Queen of Spades", my father’s favorite opera», says Herman Makarenko.

Makarenko studied at the Kiev music specialized school named after Mykola Lysenko, and graduated from the piano faculty and later - opera and symphony conducting of the National Music Academy of Ukraine of P.I. Tchaikovsky Kiev State Conservatory. Upon completion, he was already a prize-winner of competitions for young performers. Since 1982, he began his career as a conductor, although he considers his work more a mission than a profession.

Among the mentors who had a great influence on the formation and fate of a young musician were People's artists of Ukraine Roman Kofman and Oleg Ryabov, and principal conductor of the National Opera of Ukraine - Stephen Turchak. It was he who in 1987 invited, then a young intern at the Opera House, where Herman, as well as all new conductors, went through all the stages of formation - from assistant-trainee to the lead conductor.

He has toured with various symphony orchestras and opera theaters around the world, including United States, Canada, France, Italy, Belgium, Serbia, Czech Republic, Croatia, North Macedonia, Slovakia, Iran, Cyprus, Russia, Egypt, Norway, Kuwait and others.

Herman Makarenko is an adherent of charitable projects, he is convinced that music can heal human soul: “If you feel good, you need to share your happiness with those who need it,” he says. Therefore, he and the Kyiv Classic Orchestra take part in charity Viennese balls around the world, organizes interactive concerts for children for the New Year and St. Nicholas Day. The orchestra under his direction can be seen not only on opera stages, but also in social centers, children's hospitals and even in art projects in the subway.

His son and daughter, twins, who study at school, attend all of his concerts, learn to play the violin and even perform on international tours with his father. “I would really like them to love something as much as I love and adore conducting”, says the conductor.

History of the Kyiv Classic Orchestra creation is also unusual: the project, which Herman Makarenko devoted to many years of his life since 2004, was born in Paris. One of the first concerts musicians performed at the La Madeleine Cathedral in Paris, and the next was at the prestigious UNESCO Hall. Ukrainian musicians “passed this exam successfully” and have been touring around the world for many years. The orchestra widely spreads European and Ukrainian classics around the world.

Headed by Herman Makarenko Kyiv Classic Symphony Orchestra has been widely recognized in Ukraine as well as abroad. High professional status of the collective in many aspects supported by his exclusive music projects, including "Concert Premiere", "New Year’s Strauss Concert", "Declaration of love", Viennese balls in Ukraine, Cyprus, Norway, as well as exclusive projects: "Polish-Lithuanian-Ukrainian" dedicated to the 100th anniversary of the European Constitution, the "Millennium of Ukrainian violin", performed on the instruments of the string master Florian Yuriev.

Maestro collaborates with UNESCO Artists, as well as with well-known composers, musicians and sculptors all over the world - from New York to Cairo, from Paris to Beijing as part of the Global Harmony Art Foundation mission.

== Awards ==
- Honored Artist of Ukraine (23 Мау 2002) - for a significant personal contribution to the socio-economic and cultural development of the capital of Ukraine
- Order of Merit of the Third Degree (28 November 2006) - for significant personal contribution to the socio-economic and cultural development of Ukraine
- Ambassador of Ukrainian Culture (22 December 2006)
- The People's Artist of Ukraine (27 June 2015) - for a significant personal contribution to state construction, socio-economic, scientific, technical, cultural and educational development of Ukraine, significant labor achievements and high professionalism
- UNESCO Artist for Peace (29 November 2016) - in recognition of the commitment to promote music as a vehicle for dialogue and mutual understanding among people
- Honorary Citizen of the City of Kyiv (13 July 2023) - for a significant personal contribution to the cultural development of the city of Kyiv, to the enrichment of the national cultural and spiritual heritage of the city, for outstanding achievements in the development of science, education, art, in strengthening the international authority of the capital of Ukraine - the city of Kyiv
