= National Presidential Orchestra =

Ukrainian military band

Ukrainian national anthem
"Shche ne vmerla Ukrayina" as performed by the National Presidential Orchestra conducted by Anatoliy Molotay.

The National Presidential Orchestra (Ukrainian: Національний президентський оркестр, romanized: Natsionalnyi prezydentskyi orkestr) is a Ukrainian military orchestra that serves as the official musical ensemble of the President of Ukraine.

== Description ==
It was created in accordance with the resolution of the Chairman of the Verkhovna Rada on 29 November 1991. The founder was People's Artist of Ukraine Anatoliy Molotay.

In June 1992, the band was reorganized and renamed the Exemplary Band of the National Guard of Ukraine.

In September 1995, the orchestra was commissioned to provide musical support to the presentation of the Council of Europe Information and Documentation Center in Ukraine. The same year, it conducted a concert tour of Germany.

In December 1997 it was renamed into the Presidential Band of the National Guard.

On 14 April 2003, by the decree of President Leonid Kuchma, the band was granted the status of a national orchestra and was renamed into the National Presidential Orchestra.

Such musicians as Ivan Karabyts, Anatoliy Solovianenko, Yevghen Stankovych, the Yavir Quartet, the Choir of the National Opera of Ukraine collaborated with the orchestra during its existence.

== See also ==
- Royal Marines Band Service, British equivalent
- "The President's Own" United States Marine Band, U.S. equivalent
