= Dmitry Bortniansky =

Composer from Russian Empire (1751–1825)

- Дмитрий Бортнянский
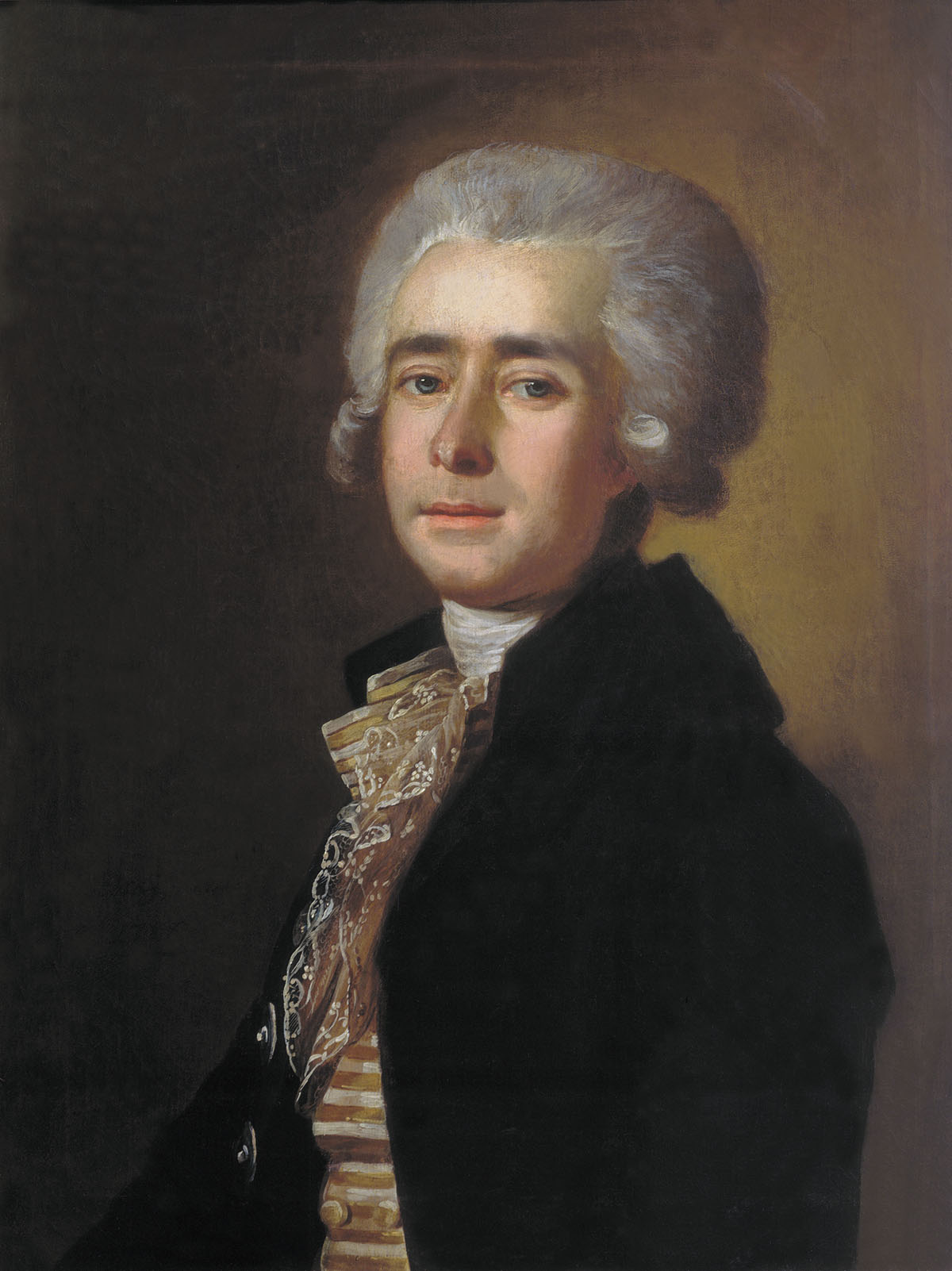
- Portrait by Mikhail Belsky (1788)
- Born: Dmitry Stepanovich Bortniansky; 28 October 1751; Glukhov, Cossack Hetmanate, Russian Empire (present-day Hlukhiv, Sumy Oblast, Ukraine)
- Died: 10 October 1825 (aged 73); Saint Petersburg, Russian Empire
- Resting place: Tikhvin Cemetery, Saint Petersburg
- Education: Hlukhiv Musical School; Kiev Mohyla Academy
- Era: Classical

Dmitry Stepanovich Bortniansky (Note: Russian: Дмитрий Степанович Бортнянский, romanized: Dmitriy Stepanovich Bortnyanskiy; Ukrainian: Дмитро Степанович Бортнянський, romanized: Dmytro Stepanovych Bortnyans'kyy; alternative transcriptions of names are Dmitri Bortnianskii, and Bortnyansky) (28 October 1751 – 10 October [O.S. 28 September] 1825) was a Russian composer of Ukrainian Cossack origin. He was also a harpsichordist and conductor who served at the court of Catherine the Great. Bortniansky was critical to the musical history of both Russia and Ukraine, with both nations claiming him as their own.

Bortniansky, who has been compared to Palestrina, is known today for his liturgical works and prolific contributions to the genre of choral concertos. He was one of the "Golden Three" of his era, alongside Artemy Vedel and Maxim Berezovsky. Bortniansky was so popular in the Russian Empire that his figure was represented in 1862 in the bronze monument of the Millennium of Russia in the Novgorod Kremlin. He composed in many musical styles, including choral works in French, Italian, Latin, German, and Church Slavonic.

== Biography ==
=== Early years ===
Dmitry Bortniansky was born on 28 October 1751 in the city of Glukhov, Cossack Hetmanate, Russian Empire (present-day Hlukhiv, Sumy Oblast, Ukraine). His father was Stefan Skurat (or Shkurat), a Lemko-Rusyn Orthodox religious refugee from the village of Bartne in the Małopolska region of Poland. Skurat served as a Cossack under Kirill Razumovski; he was entered in the Cossack register in 1755. Dmitry's mother was of Cossack origin; her name after her first marriage was Marina Dmitrievna Tolstaya, as a widow of a Russian landlord Tolstoy, who lived in Glukhov.

At age seven, Dmitry's prodigious talent at the local church choir opened him the opportunity to move to Saint Petersburg, the capital of the empire, and join the Imperial Chapel Choir. Dmitry's half-brother Ivan Tolstoy also sang with the Imperial Chapel Choir. Dmitry studied music and composition under the guidance of the Imperial Chapel Choir director Baldassare Galuppi. In 1769 Galuppi left for Italy and took the boy with him.

=== Rise to fame ===
In Italy Bortniansky gained considerable success composing operas: Creonte (1776) and Alcide (1778) in Venice, and Quinto Fabio (1779) at Modena. He also composed sacred works in Latin and German, both a cappella and with orchestral accompaniment, including an Ave Maria for two voices and orchestra.

Bortniansky returned to the Saint Petersburg Court Capella in 1779. He composed at least four more operas in French, with libretti by Franz-Hermann Lafermière: Le Faucon (1786), La fête du seigneur (1786), Don Carlos (1786), and Le fils-rival ou La moderne Stratonice (1787). Bortniansky wrote a number of instrumental works at this time, including piano sonatas, a piano quintet with a harp, and a cycle of French songs. He also composed liturgical music for the Eastern Orthodox Church, combining the Eastern and Western European styles of sacred music, incorporating the polyphony he learned in Italy; some works were polychoral, using a style descended from the Venetian polychoral technique of Gabrieli.

In 1796 Bortniansky was appointed as a director of the Imperial Chapel Choir, the first director from the Russian Empire. With such a great instrument at his disposal, he produced scores upon scores of compositions, including over 100 religious works, sacred concertos (35 for a four-part mixed choir, 10 for double choruses), cantatas, and hymns.

=== Death ===
Bortniansky died in St. Petersburg on 10 October 1825, and was interred at the Smolensky Cemetery in St. Petersburg; during the Soviet rule, his remains were reinterred into the Tikhvin Cemetery.

== Legacy ==
In 1882, Pyotr Ilyich Tchaikovsky edited Bortniansky's liturgical works, which were published in ten volumes. Bortniansky wrote operas and instrumental compositions, but his sacred choral works are performed most often today. This vast body of work remains central not only to understanding 18th-century Orthodox sacred music, but also subsequently influenced Russian and Ukrainian composers in the 19th century.

The tune he wrote for the Latin hymn Tantum Ergo eventually became known in Slavic lands as Коль славен (Kol Slaven), in which form it is still sung as a church hymn today. The tune was also popular with Freemasons. It travelled to English-speaking countries and came to be known by the names Russia, St. Petersburg or Wells. In Germany, the song was paired with a text by Gerhard Tersteegen and became a well-known chorale and traditional part of the military ceremony Großer Zapfenstreich (the Grand Tattoo), the highest ceremonial act of the German army, rendered as an honor for distinguished persons on special occasions. Before the October Revolution in 1917, the tune was played by the Kremlin carillon every day at midday. In English-speaking countries, the tune St. Petersburg is set to the office hymn for the feast of the Conversion of Paul the Apostle: 'A heavenly splendour from on high' (New English Hymnal #154b)

James Blish, who novelized many episodes of the original series of Star Trek, noted in one story, "Whom Gods Destroy", that Bortniansky's Ich bete an die Macht der Liebe was the theme "to which all Starfleet Academy classes marched to their graduation."

Bortniansky composed "The Angel Greeted the Gracious One" (hymn to the Mother of God used at Pascha) as a trio used by many Orthodox churches in the Easter season.

== Influence ==
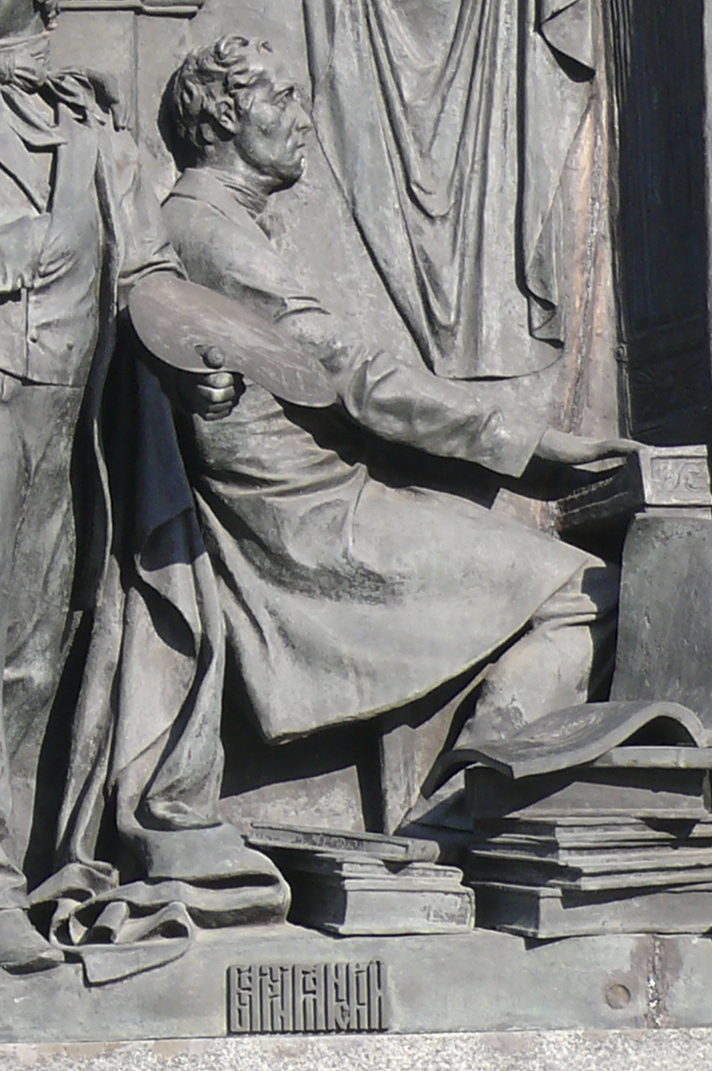
The Millennium of Russia monument in Veliky Novgorod featuring Bortniansky

Bortniansky's work had a significant impact on the development of Russian and Ukrainian music.

Almost half a century of Bortniansky's life was associated with music education, with the most important processes of the formation of musical culture in Russian Empire According to Russian musicologist Boris Asafyev, "Bortniansky developed a style with characteristic inversions, which retained its influence for several following generations. These typical appeals not only reached Mikhail Glinka, but also Pyotr Ilyich Tchaikovsky, Nikolai Rimsky-Korsakov, and Alexander Borodin".

At the same time, beginning in the 1920s, Bortniansky's work became the subject of special attention from Ukrainian musicians. Stanyslav Lyudkevych's article "D. Bortniansky and Contemporary Ukrainian Music" (1925) called on Ukrainian musicians to develop the traditions established by Bortniansky, "to dive deeper and more thoroughly into the great cultural treasury concentrated in Bortniansky's works, to find the sources in it and foundations of our revival".

Traditionally, Ukrainian musicologists emphasize the use of intonations of Ukrainian folk songs in choral work, since the composer's first musical impressions were obtained in Ukraine. Most of Bortniansky's friends in the choir were Ukrainian, as was his teacher Mark Poltoratsky. In particular, Lydia Korniy notes:

- typical for Ukrainian songs descending lyrical sixth V - VII # - I degree (on the example of choral concerts: № 13, end of the II part, and № 28, finale)
- typical inversions with a reduced fourth between III and VII # degrees in minor,
- typical for lyrical songs mournful intonations with an increased second between III and IV # degrees in minor.

Lyudkevych also notes Ukrainian intonations in Bortniansky's works:

although he adopted the manners of the Italian style and became a reformer of church singing in St. Petersburg, nevertheless, all his works (even with such disgusting to our spirit "fugues") hid so much typically Ukrainian melody that because of it he just now became unpopular Muscovites, and every foreigner from the first time hears in them something unknown to himself, original

The influence of Bortniansky's work is noted in the works of Ukrainian composers Mykola Lysenko, Kyrylo Stetsenko, Mykhailo Verbytskyi, Mykola Leontovych, M. Dremlyuga, Levko Revutsky, K. Dominchen, Borys Lyatoshynsky, and others.

== Works ==
=== Operas ===
- Creonte (1776 Venice in Italian)
- Alcide (1778 Venice in Italian)
- Quinto Fabio (1779 Modena in Italian)
- Le faucon (1786 Gatchina in French, with libretto by Franz-Hermann Lafermière)
- La Fête du seigneur (1786 Pavlovsk in French, with libretto by Franz-Hermann Lafermière)
- Don Carlos (1786 St Petersburg in French, with libretto by Franz-Hermann Lafermière)
- Le Fils-Rival ou La Moderne Stratonice (1787 Pavlovsk in French, with libretto by Franz-Hermann Lafermière)

=== Choruses (in Church Slavonic) ===
- Da ispravitsia molitva moja ("Let My Prayer Arise") no. 2.
- Kjeruvimskije pjesni (Cherubic Hymns) nos. 1-7
- Concerto No. 1: Vospoitje Gospodjevi ("Sing unto the Lord")
- Concerto No. 6: Slava vo vyshnikh Bogu, y na zemli mir ("Glory to God in the highest, and peace on earth")
- Concerto No. 7: Priiditje, vozradujemsja Gospodjevi ("Come Let Us Rejoice")
- Concerto No. 9: Sei djen', jego zhe Gospodi, konchinu moju
- Concerto No. 11: Blagoslovjen Gospod' ("Blessed is the Lord")
- Concerto No. 15: Priiditje, vospoim, ljudije
- Concerto No. 18: Blago jest ispovjedatsja ("It Is Good To Praise the Lord", Psalm 92)
- Concerto No. 19: Rjechje Gospod' Gospodjevi mojemu ("The Lord Said unto My Lord", Psalm 110)
- Concerto No. 21: Zhyvyi v pomoshshi Vyshnjago ("He That Dwelleth", Psalm 91)
- Concerto No. 24: Vozvjedokh ochi moi v gory ("I Lift Up My Eyes to the Mountains")
- Concerto No. 27: Glasom moim ko Gospodu vozzvakh ("With My Voice I Cried Out to the Lord")
- Concerto No. 32: Skazhy mi, Gospodi, konchinu moju ("Lord, Make Me Know My End")
- Concerto No. 33: Vskuju priskorbna jesi dusha moja ("Why Are You Downcast, O My Soul?", Psalm 42:5)

=== Concerto-Symphony ===
- Concerto-Symphony for Piano, Harp, Two Violins, Viola da gamba, Cello and Bassoon in B Flat Major (1790).

=== Quintet ===
- Quintet for Piano, Harp, Violin, Viola da gamba and Cello (1787).

=== Hymn ===
- How Glorious Is Our Lord in Zion (1794) - used as the official anthem of the Russian Empire
