= List of Ukrainian composers =

This is a list of Ukrainian composers of classical music who were either born on the territory of modern-day Ukraine or are considered to be ethnically Ukrainian.

== List by century of birth ==
=== 15th century ===
Composer	Date	City of birth	Notable works
Sebastian z Felsztyna	1480/1490?–after 1543	Polish Felsztyn (now modern Skelivka in Ukraine)	three motets

=== 16th century ===
Composer	Date	City of birth	Notable works
Marcin Leopolita	1537–1584	Lviv	Missa paschalis

=== 17th century ===
Composer	Date	City of birth	Notable works
Mykola Pavlovych Dyletsky	c.1630 – after 1680	Kyiv	Hramatyka muzykal’na (Musical Grammar), a textbook of polyphonic singing
Symeon Pekalytsky	c. 1630	unknown	Liturgy in 8 voices
Ivan Domaratsky	after 1650 – before 1750	unknown	"Oh you, Father Roman" and No. 10 "Your Spirit is Good", "Concerto of the Apostle Timofey", "The Catcher is Wonderful with His Tongue", concerto "The Virgin Gives Birth to the Pre-existent", "The Deliverer Has Been Sent by the Lord", concerto in 8 voices "Blessed is the Man Who Fears the Lord", All-Night Virgil "Blessed is the Man".
Herman Levytsky	? - after 1740	unknown	partes concertos: Concerto №5 “Vsjak zemnorodnyi da vozyhraietsia", Concerto №6 “Sosud sviashchennishyi”, Concerto №13 “Pryidite, poslidnie tsilovaniiie”, Concerto №14 “Koe razlucheniie, o bratiie”

=== 18th century ===
Composer	Date	City of birth	Notable works
Hrytsko from Kyiv	18th century	unknown	Liturgy for 8 voices
Tymofiy Bilohradsky	c. 1710 – c. 1782	Cherkasy?	Minuet with variations for harpsichord
Hryhorii Skovoroda	1722–1794	Chornukhy, Kiev Governorate, Cossack Hetmanate	Garden of Divine Songs, Liturgical music
Andrii Rachinsky	1724–1794	Velyki Mosty	sacred concerti, introduced the Italian style of singing in the Razumovsky chapel, contributed to the famous Razumovsky sheet music library
Maksym Prokhorovych Kontsevych	active 1773–1780s	unknown	romances, liturgical music, cantata "He took the thundering harp in his right hand" (1787)
Yelizaveta Belogradskaya	1739 – c. 1764 [?]	unknown	Imperial Court opera singer and composer for keyboard
Vasyl Fedorovych Trutovsky	c.1740 – c.1810	Belgorod, Sloboda Ukraine	music-folklore of the collection "Collection of "simple russian" songs with notes" (parts 1–4, 1776–1795) including Ukrainian folk songs, and piano variations on the themes of folk songs
Vasyl Pashkevych	c. 1742-1797	unknown	9 Operas (incl. Fevey), a Romance with lyrics by Gavrila Derzhavin, masses and other liturgical works
Maksym Berezovsky	1745–1777	Hlukhiv?, Nizhyn regiment, Cossack Hetmanate	Sacred choral concertos; composed the earliest opera, symphony, and f violin sonata
Dmytro Bortniansky	1751–1825	Hlukhiv, Nizhyn regiment, Cossack Hetmanate	Sacred choral concerti, operas, symphonie concertante, quintet, harpsichord sonata
Artemy Vedel	1767–1808	Kiev governate	Sacred choral concerti; see List of compositions by Artemy Vedel
Ilya Lyzohub	1787–1867	Kulykivka, Chernihiv governate	cello sonata in G minor
Oleksandr Lyzohub	1790–1839	Sedniv, Chernihiv governate	two nocturnes dated 1821, mazurkas, art songs ("Death in a Foreign Land"), sets of variations on Ukrainian folk songs ("Oh, There Is a Well in the Field,' "And I Had a Wife," and "Don't Go to the Party, Hryts"

=== 19th century ===
Composer	Date	City of birth	Notable works
Mykola Markevych	1804–1860	Dunaiets, Chernihiv gubernia	collection Ukrainian melodies published in 1831
Iosip Vytvytskyi	1812-1866	Kyiv	piano variation "Ukrainka" (1836), other piano compositions on ukrainian dance melodies such as a Kolomyika, two ukrainian dumkas and "The neighbour has a white house"
Semen Hulak-Artemovsky	1813–1873	Horodyshche	The first Ukrainian-language opera "Zaporozhian Cossack beyond the Danube"
Mykhaylo Verbytsky	1815–1870	Lemko region, Austrian Empire	Ukraine national anthem
Bonkovskyi Denis Fedorovych	1816–1881	Voronovytsia, Vinnytsia Oblast	the author of the lyrics and music of songs such as "Handzia", "Hey, I'm a Cossack, my name is Volya", "Cossack boredom"
Vasyl Pashchenko	1822-1891	Odesa	Polonaise "On the death of Taras Shevchenko" (1861)
Ivan Lavrivsky	1823–1873	Lopinka, Lemko region	religious and secular compositions such as "Autumn," "Zaspivai my, soloviiu" (Sing for Me, Nightingale), "Richen'ka" (The Streamlet), as well as the popular operettas Oman ochei (A Wile of the Eyes), Roksoliana, and Pan Dovhonos (Mister Long Nose)
Volodymyr Alexandrov	1825–1894	Bugayivka, Izyum district, Kharkiv gubernia	operettas "Za Neman’ idu" (Beyond the Neman I Go, 1872) and "Ne khody, Hrytsiu, na vechornytsi" (Don't Go to Parties, Hryts! 1873), song about the pumpkin
Michał A. Zawadzki	1828-1887	Mykhalkivtsi, Khmelnytskyi Oblast	more than 500 salon compositions for piano, arrangements of Ukrainian and Polish folk songs, Dumkas and Shumkas, two operas
Petro Nishchynsky	1832–1896	Nemenka, Vinnytska Oblast	chorus from "Vechornytsy": "Song of the grey Cuckoo"
Vladyslav Zaremba	1833-1902	Dunaivtsi	more than 30 compositions to the lyrics of Taras Shevchenko
Sydir Vorobkevych	1836–1903	Chernivtsi	Sacred music
Apollon Hussakovskyi	1841-1875	Okhtyrka	"Sheet from an album" and a Scherzo for piano
Anatol Vakhnianyn	1841–1908	Siniava, Peremyshl circle, Galicia	Kupalo, the first opera in western Ukraine (1870–92); music to plays by Taras Shevchenko, Fedir Zarevych, Omelian Ohonovsky, and Kornylo Ustyianovych; original choral scores to texts by Yurii Fedkovych, Ivan Hushalevych, E. Levytsky, and others; choral arrangements of Ukrainian folk songs
Mykola Lysenko	1842–1912	Poltava oblast	overture from Taras Bulba, Prayer for Ukraine The "Father of Ukrainian music". Founder of Ukrainian nationalist school of music
Arkady Abaza	1843–1915	Sudzhansky District, Kursk Governorate, Russian Empire	Piano pieces and romances, including "Foggy Morning" to the lyrics of Ivan Turgenev
Liudmyla Aleksandrova	19th century	Izium	music for the romances "I'm looking at the sky" (lyrics by Mykhailo Petrenko) and "Blow, wind, to Ukraine" (lyrics by Stepan Rudanskyi)
Tymofiy Bezuhlyi	fl. 1850s; 1860s		the ballad "Konoshevych-Sahaidachnyi", elegy "Barvinok", scherzo "Rusalky", "Ukrainian lullaby", Mazurka "Podolianka" (1865)
Viktor Matiuk	1852–1912	Tudorkovychi, Zhovkva circle, Galicia	folk song arrangements, melodramas such as "Kapral Tymko" (Corporal Tymko), "Neshchasna liubov" (Unlucky Love), "Invalid" (The Invalid), and "Nashi poselentsi" (Our Settlers), anthology of the works of Ukrainian composers titled Boian (The Troubadour, 1884; 2nd edn 1886), school and church songbooks
Mykola Arkas	1853–1909	Mykolaiv	the opera "Kateryna" (1890)
Ostap Nyzhankivsky	1862–1919	Drohobych, Galicia	works for choir "Hulialy" (They Danced) and "Z Okrushkiv" (From Crumbs, text by Yurii Fedkovych), art songs for solo voice with piano accompaniment, including "Mynuly lita molodii" (The Years of Youth Have Passed By); arrangements of folk songs for solo voice or choir; and Vitrohony, a cycle of kolomyika melodies for piano
Denys Sichynsky	1865–1909	Kliuvyntsi, Husiatyn county, Galicia	opera Roksoliana (libretto by V. Lutsyk and Stepan Charnetsky, 1908); works for symphony and chamber orchestras; piano solos; choral music, including the cantata Lichu v nevoli (I Count the Days and Nights in captivity; text by Taras Shevchenko); a score for a liturgy; approximately 20 art songs for solo voice to texts by T. Shevchenko, L. Ukrainka, I. Franko, B. Lepky, U. Kravchenko, and H. Heine; and arrangements of folk songs
Gregory Alchevsky	1866–1920	Kharkiv	Alyosha Popovych, romances, other works
Filaret Kolessa	1871–1947	Lviv oblast	Ukrainian ethnographic musicology
Mykhailo Bukynyk	1872–1947	Dubno	
Reinhold Glière	1875–1956	Kyiv	Numerous orchestral works, concertos, ballets, vocal works
Oleksandr Koshyts	1875–1944	Romashky, near Kyiv	Sacred music (liturgies, songs), collecting and arrangements of folk songs
Borys Yanovsky	1875–1933	Moscow	10 operas, notably Sorochyntsi Fair (1899) and Black Sea Duma or Samiilo Kishka (1927); two ballets; orchestral pieces; chamber music works; violin and piano music; works for chorus; art songs; and arrangements of Ukrainian folk songs
Fedir Stepanovych Yakymenko	1876–1945	Pisky	two symphonies, symphonic poems, an orchestral suite, an overture, a trio for strings, a sonata for cello, sonatas for violin, and numerous works for piano
Serhii Bortkevych	1877–1952	Kharkiv	Works by Bortkiewicz include two symphonies, three piano concertos, a violin concerto, and a cello concerto
Davyd Novakivsky	1877–1921	Malyn	Synagogue music, choral, organ, and orchestral works
Mykola Leontovych	1877–1921	Monastyrok (Podilia)	Shchedryk which eventually became the "Carol of the Bells"
Stanyslav Lyudkevych	1879–1979	Yaroslav (present-day Poland)	cantata The Caucasus (1902–13), inspired by Taras Shevchenko's poem, The Eternal Revolutionary (1898), The Reaper (1901), Khor pidzemnykh kovaliv (The Chorus of Underground Blacksmiths, 1905), Oi, vyhostriu tovarysha (Oh, I'll Hone My Knife, 1917), and The Testament (1934) symphonic compositions The [Sich] Riflemen's Rhapsody, 1920), Kameniari (The Stonecutters, 1926, 1956), and Vesnianky (Spring Songs, 1935), Symfonietta (1943), Koliadnytsia (Christmas Caroller, 1944), Iunats’ke rondo (The Rondo of Youth, 1946), the symphonic poem The Dnieper (1948), Prykarpats’ka symfoniia (The Subcarpathian Symphony, 1952), and the opera Dovbush
Pavlo Senytsia	1879–1960	Maksymivka, Pereiaslav county, Poltava gubernia	operas Life Is a Dream (based on Calderón) and The Servant Girl (based on Taras Shevchenko, 1913–16); two symphonies (1905, 1912); an overture (1908); seven string quartets; approximately 50 works of choral music to texts by Shevchenko, Mykola Bazhan, and others; and approximately 100 solo art songs to texts by Shevchenko, Pavlo Tychyna, Maksym Rylsky, and others
Grigory Kompaneyets	1881-1959	Poltava	The Wolf and the Seven Kids (1939; 2nd edition – 1954)
Mykola Roslavets	1881–1944	Dushatyn, Chernihiv	Orchestral and chamber atonal works, Known as the Ukrainian Schoenberg
Kyrylo Stetsenko	1882–1922	Cherkashchyna	Requiem "Zhuravli" (the cranes)
Yakiv Stepovy	1883–1921	Kharkiv	Art songs to the words of T. Shevchenko, I. Franko, Lesia Ukrainka, P. Tychyna, M. Rylskyi
Thomas de Hartmann	1884–1956	Khoruzhivka	See list of compositions by Thomas de Hartmann
Vasyl Barvinsky	1888–1963	Ternopil	works for piano, orchestra, choir on ukrainian folk and literary themes
Mykola Vilinsky	1888–1956	Holta, Ananiv povit	Symphonic suites, music for piano, and arrangements for choir and solo voices of Ukrainian, Russian, Moldavian folk songs
Levko Revutsky	1889–1977	Irzhavets, Pryluky	Symphony 2
Sergei Prokofiev	1891–1953	Sontsivka, Donetsk	5 piano concertos, 9 piano sonatas, 7 symphonies, Suite from Romeo and Juliet, Suite from Lieutenant Kijé
Vsevolod Zaderatsky	1891–1953	Rivne	two operas, several symphonic compositions (including Symphony No. 1, 1951), chamber music, choral works (eg, the Suite on Ukrainian Folk Texts [1950] and a choral poem dedicated to Viktor Kosenko [1948]), and art songs, five piano sonatas, a suite, a cycle of 24 preludes and fugues
Mykhailo Haivoronsky	1892–1949	Zalischyky	songs of the Ukrainian Sich Riflemen, choral works, church music, and instrumental music for violin, string orchestra, band, and symphony orchestra. He also arranged many folk songs and compiled a number of songbooks
Pavlo Pecheniha-Uhlytsky	1892–1948	Pechenihy, Vovchansk county, Kharkiv gubernia	the opera The Witch (after Yevhen Hrebinka, libretto by Stepan Charnetsky, 1936–1940), the ballet Legin' (Young Lad; libretto by Dmytro Chutro, 1938), the tone poem Ukraïna (after Taras Shevchenko's Haidamaky), three string quartets, and the cantata Biut' porohy (The Rapids Roar; text by Shevchenko) for mixed chorus and orchestra
Pylyp Kozytsky	1893–1960	Letychivka, Cherkasy Oblast	works based on elements of Ukrainian folk music with social and patriotic characteristics
Valentyn Kostenko	1895–1960	Urazovo, Valuiki county, Voronezh gubernia	the operas Karmeliuk, Nazar Stodolia (based on the play by Taras Shevchenko), and The Carpathians; the ballet Reborn Steppe; the symphony The Year 1917; a suite for symphony orchestra; violin, piano, and choral pieces; and six string quartets. studies of Pavlo Senytsia (1922), the role of folk songs in Ukrainian music (1928), the influence of German expressionism on Ukrainian music (1929)
Borys Liatoshynskyi	1895–1968	Zhytomyr	Operas The Golden Ring (1929) and Shchors (1937), the five symphonies, the Overture on Four Ukrainian Folk Themes (1926), the suites Taras Shevchenko (1952) and Romeo and Juliet (1955), the symphonic poem Grazhyna (1955), his "Slavic" piano concerto (1953), and the completion and orchestration of Reinhold Glière's violin concerto (1956)
Roman Prydatkevych	1895–1980	Żywiec, near Cracow	four symphonies, the Ukrainian Suite for chamber orchestra, works for violin and piano such as the Hutsul Suite, two rhapsodies, and a sonata
Viktor Kosenko	1896–1938	St. Petersburg	sonata for cello and piano (1923), Classical Trio for piano, violin, and cello (1927), a sonata for violin and piano (1927), Heroic Overture (1932), Moldavian Poem (1937), a piano concerto, three piano sonatas, a trio, a violin concerto, about 100 piano pieces, including 24 pieces for children (1936)
Stefania Turkewich	1898–1977	Lviv	Her opera "Mavka" is based on Lesia Ukrainka's Forest Song

=== 20th century ===
Composer	Date	City of birth	Notable works
Roman Simovych	1901–1984	Sniatyn, then in Austrian Galicia	Ballet, 7 symphonies, symphonic poems, symphonic overtures, suites, flute concerto, string quartet, two trios, works for violin, cello, piano, and mixed choir, piano concerto
Andriy Shtoharenko	1902–1992	Novi Kaidaky (now part of Dnipro)	symphonic cantata Ukraïno moia (My Ukraine, 1943), the Kyiv Symphony (1972), symphonic suites, a violin concerto, chamber and choral pieces, art songs, incidental music, and film scores
Antin Rudnytsky	1902–1975	Luka, Sambir county, Galicia	operas Dovbush (1938) and Anna Yaroslavna (1967), three symphonies, a ballet suite and the ballet Burï nad Zakhodom (Storms over the West, 1932), a lyric poem, an overture, a concerto for cello and orchestra, the oratorio Haidamaky (1974), the cantata Moses (to Ivan Franko's poem), Poslaniie (The Epistle, to Taras Shevchenko's poem)
Mykola Kolessa	1903-2006	Sambir	two symphonies, The Ukrainian Suite (1928), Symphonic Variations (1931), a suite for string orchestra In the Mountains (1935), a piano quartet, a piano suite Portraits of the Hutsul Region (1934), Fantastic Prelude (1938), Autumn Prelude (1969), and other piano pieces, arrangements of folk songs, and The Lemko Wedding for a mixed choir and a string quartet
Yuliy Meitus	1903–1997	Elysavet, now modern Kropyvnytskyi	Considered the founder of the Ukrainian Soviet opera. Composed 18 operas, most notably Perekop (1939–40) and Haidamaky (1940–41) (both composed with Vsevolod Rybalchenko and Mykhailo Tits), Abadan (composed with A. Kuliev, 1942–43), Star over the Dvina (1951–1955), Stolen Happiness (1958–59), and Yaroslav the Wise (1973) and about 300 songs.
Yevhen Adamtsevych	1904–1972	Solonytsia near Lubny	Zaporozhian March
Kostiantyn Dankevych	1905–1984	Odesa	operas Trahediina nich (Tragic Night, 1935), Bohdan Khmelnytsky (1951; new version, 1953), and Nazar Stodolia (1960); the ballet Lileia (Lily, 1939); two symphonies (1937, 1945); the symphonic poems Otello (Othello, 1937) and Taras Shevchenko (1939); a string quartet; a trio; choral works; and film scores and art songs for solo voice
Dmytro Klebanov	1907–1987	Kharkiv	Symphony No.1 In Memoriam to the Martyrs of Babi Yar (1945)
Anatol Kos-Anatolsky	1909–1983	Kolomyia, Galicia	the opera To Meet the Sun (1957, revised as The Fiery Sky, 1959); the ballets Dovbush's Kerchief (1951), The Jay's Wing (1956), and Orysia (1964); the operetta Spring Storms (1960); the cantatas It Passed a Long Time Ago (1961) and The Immortal Testament (1963); the oratorio From the Niagara to the Dnieper (1969); two piano concertos and two violin concertos; chamber music; piano pieces; and choral works
Arkady Filippenko	1912–1983	Pushcha-Vodytsia, Kyiv	more than 500 songs
Ihor Markevych	1912–1983	Kyiv	Rébus with Leonid Massine in 1931 and L'envol d'Icare in 1932, revised under the title Icare (1943)
Dezső Zádor	1912–1985	Uzhhorod	
Kyr Kuklovskyi	1913-1999	Lutsk	2 symphonies, a suite on Ukrainian themes, the symphonic poem ‘The Sea’, works for violin, cello and choir, romances, as well as works for children (in particular, ‘20 Miniatures’ on Ukrainian themes; the children’s musical ‘The Fox Market’, libretto by Leonid Poltava (1986)
Heorhiy Maiboroda	1913–1992	Kremenchuk	operas Mylana (1957), Arsenal (1960), Taras Shevchenko (1964), and Yaroslav the Wise (1973); three symphonies (1940, 1952, 1976); a concerto for voice and orchestra (1969); the symphonic poems Lily, (text by Taras Shevchenko, 1939) and Kameniari (Stone-cutters, text by Ivan Franko, 1941); the vocal-symphonic poem Zaporozhians (text by Liubov Zabashta, 1954); and the orchestral Hutsul Rhapsody (1949)
Bohdan Vesolovsky	1915–1971	Vienna	Author of songs performed by Jablonsky Jazz Chapel in Lviv during the Interwar era
Platon Maiboroda	1918–1989	Pelekhivshchyna (Poltava Governorate)	the symphonic overture Prometheus, choral works, and the vocal-symphonic poem Poplar, (text by Taras Shevchenko, 1966). He is best known for his popular songs, such as "The Kyiv Waltz", "White Chestnuts," "Song about the Dnieper," and the widely familiar "Rushnychok" (Embroidered Towel, text by Andrii Malyshko), which is commonly known as "Ridna maty moia" (Dear Mother Mine)
Iryna Vilinska	1920–1986	Odesa	Vocalises, romances, piano arrangements of folk songs
George Fiala	1922–2017	Kyiv	over 200 works including symphonies, concertos, chamber music, and educational pieces for children
Yudif Rozhavska	1923–1982	Kyiv	Ballet Kingdom of the Crooked Mirrors, 2 cantatas, soundtracks, chamber music, operetta, orchestra and piano music
Ihor Shamo	1925–1982	Kyiv	Yak tebe ne liubyty, Kyieve mii!
Ihor Sonevytsky	1926–2006	Hadynkivtsi, Kopychyntsi county, Galicia	opera Star, the ballet Cinderella, incidental music for numerous theater plays, a Piano Concerto in G Major, variations and miniatures for piano, approximately 60 art songs for voice and piano (including cycles to texts by Taras Shevchenko, Ivan Franko, and Vasyl Symonenko), the cantata Love Ukraine, and church music
Oleksandr Bilash	1931–2003	Hradizhsk, Poltava Oblast	Composer of popular songs, operas, ballads, oratorios, and film music
Yuriy Oliynyk	1931–2021	Ternopil	Concertos for bandura and orchestra, music for solo bandura, piano, voice
Vitaliy Serhiyovich Hubarenko	1934–2000	Kharkiv	Zahybel’ eskadry ‘The Destruction of the Squadron’ (1966)
Boris Mykolayovych Buyevsky	1935–	Kryvyi Rih	
Vitaliy Hodziatsky	1936–	Kyiv	avant-garde works
Oleksandr Krasotov	1936–2007	Odesa	Symphony, chamber, vocal music
Liubomyr Yakym	1936–2014	Volia, near Staryi Sambir	Oy, Smereko
Valentyn Sylvestrov	1937–	Kyiv	Seven symphonies, three piano sonatas, piano pieces, chamber music, vocal works
Mykola Kapustin	1937–2020	Horlivka	Jazz
Myroslav Skoryk	1938–2020	Lviv	Operas, symphony, string quartets, music solo instruments such as piano
Virko Baley	1938–	Radekhiv	Symphony No. 1: Sacred Monuments, Dreamtime for chamber ensemble, Emily Dickinson Songbooks
Volodymyr Huba	1938–2020	Kyiv	Music scores for 70 films, including The Stone Cross
Lesia Dychko	1939–	Kyiv	the symphony Pryvitannia zhyttia (Welcoming Life) for soprano, bass, and chamber orchestra, based on the words of the imagist poet Bohdan Ihor Antonych, and Viter revoliutsii (Wind of the Revolution) based on the poems of Maksym Rylsky and Pavlo Tychyna; numerous cantatas to the words of Taras Shevchenko, Mykola Vinhranovsky, and other poets; choir concertos and two choir poems: Holod – 33 (Famine 1933; based on the words of S. Kolomiiets) and Lebedi materynstva (The Swans of Motherhood; based on the poems by Vasyl Symonenko)
Valentin Bibik	1940–2003	Kharkiv	
Ihor Poklad	1941–2025	Frunze, Kyrghyz SSR (now Kyrgyzstan)	Popular music, film scores
Yevhen Stankovych	1942–	Svaliava	Orchestral, chamber, film music
Levko Dutkivskiy	1943-2023	Kuty	Popular music (see works)
Viktor Hutsal	1944–	Trebuchivtsi, Khmelnytskyi oblast'	orchestration of the Zaporozhian march
Ivan Karabyts	1945–2002	Yalta (Donetsk oblast')	Concerto for choir and orchestra “Garden of Divine Songs”; Symphony "5 songs about Ukraine", 2nd concert for orchestra, 3rd concert for orchestra; Symphony for strings
Volodymyr Ivasiuk	1949–1979	Kitsman	Songs: Chervona Ruta, Vodohrai
Karmella Tsepkolenko	1955–	Odesa	Works for stage and orchestra, chamber and vocal music.
Ihor Bilozir	1955–2000	Radekhiv	Popular songs
Marian Hadenko	1955–2021	Storozhynets	Pop songs
Hanna Havrylets	1958–2022	Ternopil	See: Works
Roman Yakub	1958–	Vinnytsia	Phonopolis for String Orchestra, Castalian Dances for chamber ensemble
Oleksandr Shchetynsky	1960–	Kharkiv	Annunciation, chamber opera (1998)
Roman Turovsky-Savchuk	1961–	Kyiv	Baroque music
Roman Hurko	1962–	Toronto	Three Liturgies, Requiem for Victims of Chernobyl, Vespers
Julia Gomelskaya	1964–2016	Odesa	"The Riot" for wind symphony orchestra, "Ukraine Forever" symphony, "Winter pastoral" for choir
Bohdana Frolyak	1968–	Vydyniv	See: Works
Taras Kompanichenko	1969–	Kyiv	Ukrainian traditional music
Vlad DeBriansky	1972–	Kalush	Jazz, blues
Svitlana Azarova	1976–	Izmail, Odesa Oblast	Chronometer for Piano, Asiope for chamber ensemble
Oleksandr Shymko	1977–	Borshchiv	Orchestral, chamber, electronic, theater music
Valeriy Antonyuk	1979–	Derenkovets, Korsun-Shevchenkivskyi Raion, Cherkasy Oblast	Cantata in five parts on the lyrics by Federico Garsia Lorca for soprano and symphony orchestra (recorded in 2005), piano Concert (rec. in 2007), four songs on the lyrics by Vasyl Stus for soprano and symphony orchestra (rec. in 2008)
Bohdan Syroyid	1995–	Lviv	Piano, chamber music

== Sources ==
- Jensen, Claudia R.; Vorob'yov, Yevgeny (23 February 2011). "Diletsky [Dїletsky, Dilezki], Nikolay [Nikolai] (Pavlovich) [Dylecki, Mikołaj]". Grove Music Online (8th ed.). Oxford University Press. doi:10.1093/gmo/9781561592630.article.07795. ISBN 978-1-56159-263-0. (subscription, Wikilibrary access, or UK public library membership required)
