= Nezhdanova =

Nezhdanova (Russian: Нежданова) is a Russian feminine surname. It may refer to

- Antonina Nezhdanova (1873–1950), Russian lyric soprano
- 4361 Nezhdanova, a minor planet named after her
