= Flys =

Flys may refer to:

- The Flys (American band)
- The Flys (British band)
- Volodymyr Flys (1924–1987), Ukrainian composer

== See also ==
- Fly (disambiguation)
