= Kostiantyn Dankevych =

Kostiantyn Dankevych Костянтин Данькевич Shevchenko National Prize laureate
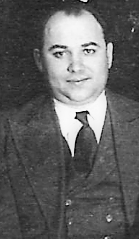
- Dankevych in 1937

Background information
- Born: December 24, 1905; Odesa, Russian Empire (present-day Ukraine)
- Died: February 26, 1984 (aged 78) Kiev, Ukrainian SSR, Soviet Union
- Genres: Classical
- Occupations: Composer, conductor, pianist, teacher
- Instrument: Piano

Kostiantyn Fedorovych Dankevych (Note: Ukrainian: Костянтин Федорович Данькевич, romanized: Kostiantyn Fedorovych Dankevych; Russian: Константин Фёдорович Данькевич, romanized: Konstantin Fyodorovich Dankevich) (December 24, 1905 – February 26, 1984) was a Soviet and Ukrainian composer, conductor, pianist and teacher. He was awarded the People's Artist of the USSR in 1954.

== Biography ==
Kostiantyn Dankevych was born in Odesa, in the Russian Empire (in present-day Ukraine). He studied at the Odesa Conservatory with Vasily Zolotarev and Mykola Vilinsky and graduated in 1929. His friendship and collaboration with Vilinsky lasted many years. He was made the director of Songs and Dance of the Red Army Choir in Tbilisi. Kostiantyn wrote his first symphony in 1937. Two years later he wrote his most popular score, the ballet Lileya.

Dankevych taught composition at the Odesa Conservatory starting from 1944. In 1953, he was promoted to the staff of the Kyiv Conservatory. Dankevych used many Ukrainian and Russian Folk motifs. One of his notable works was his opera Bohdan Khmelnytsky (premiered January 29, 1951). Following its June premiere in Moscow, Pravda issued some vague and insignificant criticisms of the work, namely that it had not sufficiently portrayed the Polish gentry as enemies, that it did not depict the suffering of the masses, and it lacked a battle scene. The Ukrainian authorities took this criticism much further, attacking the libretto for “insufficiently glorifying the historical Russian-Ukraine friendship.” After several rounds of revisions, the opera was staged on September 27, 1953, to rave reviews, and was similarly well received when performed again in Moscow in May 1954.

When teaching he often wore two pairs of socks due to his superstitions.

In 1960, he wrote the opera Nazar Stodolya. Other works include Poem of Ukraine, several overtures and patriotic courses. In 1959, a monograph was published on him in Kyiv.

Kostiantyn Dankevych died on February 26, 1984, in Kyiv, in the Ukrainian SSR of the Soviet Union (in present-day Ukraine).
