= Palade (surname) =

Palade, Pallade, Paladi and Pallady are Romanian surnames. Notable people with the surname include:

- George Emil Palade, Romanian-American cell biologist
- George D. Pallade, Romanian politician
- Gheorghe Paladi
- Radu Paladi
- Theodor Pallady
