= Witold Maliszewski =

Polish composer (1873–1939)

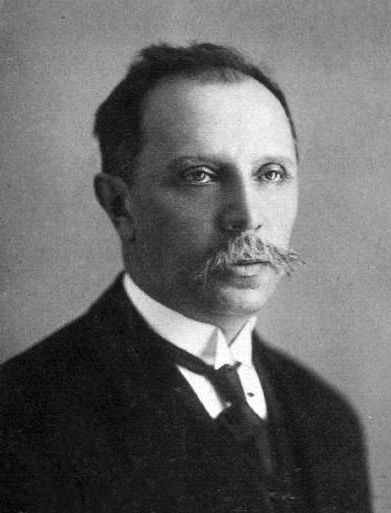
Witold Maliszewski before 1927, Warsaw

Witold Maliszewski (Russian: Витольд Осипович Малишевский, Ukrainian: Вітольд Йосифович Малішевський; 20 July 1873 – 18 July 1939) was a Polish composer, founder of Odessa Conservatory, and a professor of Warsaw Conservatory.

== Biography ==
Maliszewski was born in Mohyliv-Podilskyi, Russian Empire (now Ukraine). He graduated from Saint Petersburg Conservatory, in the class of Nikolai Rimsky-Korsakov. He was a member of Belyayev circle. In 1913 he became a founder and the first director of the Odessa Conservatory, which gave the world a number of outstanding musicians, such as David Oistrakh, Emil Gilels and Yakov Zak.

After the Russian revolution, because of the imminent threat of Bolshevik persecution, Maliszewski immigrated to Poland in 1921. In 1925–1927 he was teaching at the Chopin Music School and was the Director of the Warsaw Music Society. In 1927 he served as Chairman of the First International Frederic Chopin Piano Competition. From 1931 to 1934 Maliszewski was the Director of the Music Department at the Polish Ministry of Education. From 1931 to 1939 he was a professor at the Warsaw Conservatory. He died in Zalesie near Warsaw.

Maliszewski's early symphonic and other works were largely shaped by the St. Petersburg composition school which produced a number of outstanding composers. His symphonies (I-III) belong to the non-programmatic (Glazunov's) type. The Fourth symphony in D Major op. 21 composed in Warsaw reflects new style in his creative output and contains elements of Polish dances.

In the Soviet Union, Maliszewski’s name was prohibited, and in 1950 — while Joseph Stalin was still alive — the conservatory he had founded in Odessa was renamed after Antonina Nezhdanova, who had no links with the institution. In 2021, the Historical and Toponymic Commission of the Executive Committee of the Odesa City Council declined a proposal to install a commemorative plaque on the facade of the Odesa Music Academy in honor of its founder, Witold Maliszewski. In 2024, a street in Odesa was named after Witold Maliszewski. The decision was described in the article “Witold Maliszewski, Founder and First Rector of the Odesa Conservatory: A Return After One Hundred Years.”

His students included Witold Lutosławski, Mykola Vilinsky, Vernon Duke, Shimon Shteynberg, Boleslaw Woytowicz, Feliks Roderyk Łabuński, and Feliks Rybicki.

== Theory of musical forms ==
A notable achievement of Maliszewski was the introduction of an innovative course in the theory of musical forms at the Warsaw Conservatory. Witold Lutosławski later recalled that the course remained with him throughout his life. Its originality lay in combining the dynamic and structural aspects of musical form with the psychology of its perception.

According to Lutosławski's recollections, Maliszewski associated this approach with the semantically charged concept of akcja (“action”) in a musical work, which was also closely connected with his concept of symphonism. Maliszewski's theory of musical forms distinguished four types of musical “characters”: introductory, narrative, transitional, and concluding. Emphasizing that this has nothing to do with extramusical (programmatic) elements, Lutosławski polarizes the terms “form” and “content,” placing the narrative character closest to the pole of content and allowing the other three “characters” to approach the pole of form. Form represents the ideal polarity of purposeful (linear) music, while content is its nonlinear antipode.

== Selected works ==
Stage

- Syrena (The Mermaid), Opera-Ballet in 4 acts, Op. 24; libretto by Ludomir Michał Rogowski (1927)
- Boruta, Ballet (1929)

Orchestral

- Symphony No. 1 in G minor, Op. 8 (1902)
- Joyful Overture (Ouverture joyeuse; Fröhliche Ouverture) in D major, Op. 11 (1910)
- Symphony No. 2 in A major, Op. 12 (1912)
- Symphony No. 3 in C minor, Op. 14 (1907?)
- Symphony No. 4 in D major, Op. 21, Odrodzonej i odnalezionej ojczyźnie (To the newborn and recovered homeland) (1925)

Concertante

- Fantazja kujawska (Kuyavian Fantasy) for piano and orchestra/ (1928)
- Concerto in B♭ minor for piano and orchestra, Op. 29 (1938)

Chamber music

- Sonata for violin and piano, Op. 1 (1900)
- String Quartet No. 1 in F major, Op. 2 (1902)
- Quintet in D minor for 2 violins, viola and 2 cellos, Op. 3 (1904)
- String Quartet No. 2 in C major, Op. 6 (1905)
- String Quartet No. 3 in E♭ major, Op. 15 (1914)
- Quatre morceaux for violin & piano, Op. 20 (1923)

Piano

- Six Piano Pieces, Op. 4 (1904)
- Prélude et fugue fantastiques in B♭ minor, Op. 16 (1913)

Choral

- Requiem (1930)
- Missa Pontificalis (1930)

== Discographie ==
=== Archive recordings ===
- 1952 : Fantazja kujawska (Wladyslaw Kedra, Polish Radio Orchestra of Bydgoszcz, cond. Arnold Rezler)
- 1959 : Piano Concerto (Jakub Kalecki, Jerzy Gert)
- Piano Concerto (Andrzej Stefański, Polish Radio National SO)

=== Commercial recordings ===
- 2014 : Works for Violin and Piano: Violin Sonata & 4 Pieces (Joanna Ławrynowicz, Anna Orlik, Józef Kolinek) – Acte Préalable AP0285
- 2014 : Chamber Music vol. 1: String Quartet No. 2; String Quintet (Four Strings Quartet; Wojciech Fudala) – Acte Préalable AP0327
- 2015 : Complete Works for Piano (Joanna Ławrynowicz) – Acte Préalable AP0320
- 2016 : Symphony No. 3 & Piano Concerto (Peter Donohoe, RSNO, Martin Yates) – Dutton CDLX7325 review
- 2017 : Chamber Music vol. 2: String Quartets Nos. 1 & 3; Melodia (Four Strings Quartet, Artur Cimirro) – Acte Préalable AP0376
- 2020 : String Quartets Nos. 2 & 4 (Camerata Quartet) — PSCM 001
- 2021: Symphonic works: Symphonies Nos. 1—4 etc. (Orkiestra Filharmonii Opolskiej, Przemysław Neumann) [3 CDs] – DUX 1716–18
