= Iryna Vilinska =

Soviet soprano, composer and music educator (1920–1986)

Iryna Mykolaivna Vilinska
- Ірина Миколаївна Вілінська
- Born: 7 September 1920; Odessa
- Died: 21 August 1986 (aged 65); Kiev
- Citizenship: Soviet Union
- Education: Kiev Conservatory
- Occupations: Musician, composer, music educator
- Father: Mykola Vilinsky

Iryna Mykolaivna Vilinska (Ukrainian: Ірина Миколаївна Вілінська, romanized: Iryna Mykolaivna Vilins'ka; 7 September 1920 – 21 or 31 August 1986) was a Soviet and Ukrainian soprano, composer, and music teacher. She was the daughter of Mykola Vilinsky.

== Biography ==
Iryna Vilinska was born on 7 September 1920 in Odessa. She showed musical talent at a young age. Vilinska was a student of the Odessa Music and Theater Rabfak in 1933–34 and the Odessa Construction Rabfak in 1936, graduating in 1938. In 1939 she transferred to the Odessa Music School and later, in 1941, the Odessa Conservatory. Her family took refuge in Tashkent due to the Second World War, where she maintained close ties with Kseniya Derzhynska. Vilinska moved to Kiev in 1944, where she continued her studies in the Kiev Conservatory under Dometii Yevtushenko. She graduated in 1946.

The singer taught at the Glière Music College until 1948. From 1949 she taught at the Kiev Conservatory. Her students included Volodymyr Bohomaz, Anatolii Ponomarenko, Viktor Titkin, and Anatolii Manyachenko. Vilinska was also a capable pianist. She died on 21 August 1986 in Kiev. Other sources give her death date as 31 August 1986. Vilinska was buried at the Baikove Cemetery.

== Music ==
Vilinska wrote vocalises, several romances, and arrangements of folk songs for piano. Her vocalises were highly appreciated. Levko Revutsky recommended the vocalises for use in teaching. Vilinska's vocalises are used for training at the Gnessin State Musical College. Her last collection of vocalises was published posthumously in 1989 and quickly sold out.

== Selected Works ==
1. Vocalises for High Voice with Piano. Kyiv, 1952.
2. Vocalises for Medium Voice with Piano. Kyiv, 1961.
3. Vocalises for Low Voice with Piano. Kyiv, 1962.
4. Ukrainian Folk Songs for Bass with Piano Accompaniment. Arrangements by I. Vilinska. Kyiv, 1967.
5. “The Role of Repertoire in the Education of the Singer.” In Issues of Vocal Pedagogy: Collected Articles. Moscow, 1967. Issue 3, pp. 49–90.
6. Musical and Aural Training of Singers. Manuscript. 1975. 59 pp.
7. Vocalises for High Voice with Piano. Moscow, 1969.
8. Pedagogical Repertoire of the Singer. Five collections for: (a) tenor; (b) mezzo-soprano; (c) soprano; (d) bass; (e) baritone. Kyiv, 1969.
9. Vocalises for the Beginning Singer. Kyiv, 1971.
10. Vocalises for Medium Voice. Kyiv, 1989.
