= Mykola Vilinsky =

Ukrainian composer

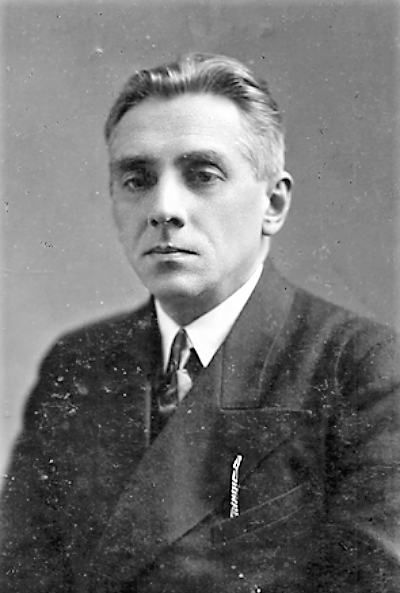
Mykola Vilinsky in 1937

Mykola Mykolayovych Vilinsky (Note: Also spelled Nikolai Vilinsky, Nikolai Vilinski, N. Vilinskii, and Mykola Vilinskyi.) (Ukrainian: Микола Миколайович Вілінський; 14 May 1888 – 9 September 1956) was a Soviet and Ukrainian composer who held senior chairs at the Odesa Conservatory and later the Kyiv Conservatory. He wrote articles on Ukrainian and Moldovan music, and was a music critic and an expert on the works of the Ukrainian composer Mykola Lysenko.

Following the wishes of his father, Vilinsky was initially educated for a career as a lawyer, but then changed to study music at the Odesa Conservatory, from which he graduated in 1919. He taught and composed there for twenty years. During the Second World War he and his family was evacuated from Odesa to Tashkent, where he continued to teach and compose. After the end of the war, he returned to Ukraine and became a professor at the Kyiv Conservatory, where he remained until his death in 1956. His students included Kostiantyn Dankevych, Oleksandr Bilash, Oscar Feltsman, David Gershfeld, and Anton Mucha.

Mykola Vilinsky was one of the founders of modern Ukrainian music and the creator of the Ukrainian piano ballad genre. Vilinsky's output includes symphonic suites, music for piano, and arrangements for choir and solo voices of Ukrainian, Russian, Moldavian folk songs. His daughter, Iryna Vilinska was also a professor of music and a composer.

== Life ==
=== Early years and education ===
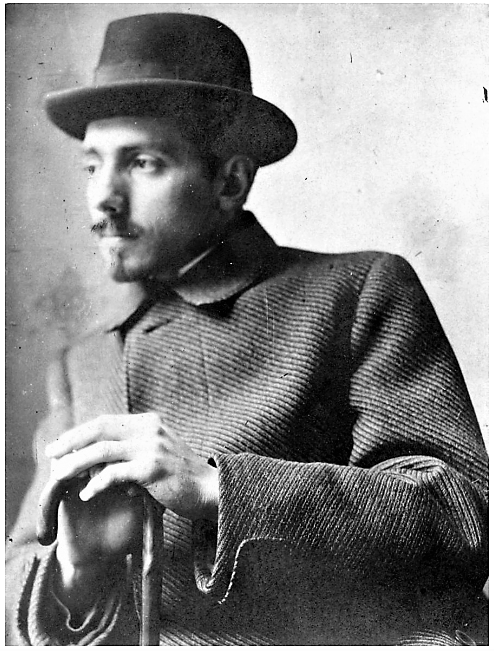
Vilinsky, 1911

Mykola Mykolayovych Mykola was born on 2/14 May 1888, (Note: the Russian Empire was still using old style dates in the 19th century, rendering his lifespan as 2 May 1888 – 7 September 1956.) in Holta, in the Russian Empire, now part of the Ukrainian city of Pervomaisk. He had an older sister, Tamara. Vilinsky's wife Olena Petrivna was a descendant of the Baroque era composer Josse Boutmy, who belonged to a family of musicianship from Ghent known as the Boutmy Dynasty. His father Mykola Oleksandrovych Vilinsky was the mayor of Ananiv. The family on his father's side was descended from a Polish nobleman, Tomasz Wiliński.

The Ukrainian writer Marko Vovchok, born Mariia Vilinskа may also have been related to the family. The so-called "golden soprano" of the Bolshoi Theatre, Ksenia Derzhynska, and the musicologist and writer Alexander Ossovsky were both his cousins.

Vilinsky's mother was his first music teacher. He began to seriously engage in music on his own whilst at school in Ananiv, conducting the church choir and organizing the school's folk music orchestra. After he completed his school education in 1906, his father decided to prepare his son for a career in law, and Vilinsky entered the Faculty of Law of the Imperial Novorossian University in Odesa, where he graduated in 1912. For a short period he worked in the Odesa District Court.

Whilst still studying law, Vilinsky attended the Odesa Music School, where he studied composition under Witold Maliszewski who later was the teacher of Witold Lutosławski. (Note: The Odesa Music School was reorganized in 1913 to become the Odesa Conservatory.) Maliszewski valued Vilinsky as one of his best students. When he and his family was forced to leave Odesa, attempted to take Vilinsky along with them. Despite the strictly enforced censorship that existed, Vilinsky and Maliszewski continued to correspond. In 1917 he finally abandoned the idea of a career in law to devote himself to music. Despite his studies being interrupted in 1916 by conscription into the army, he graduated from the Odesa Conservatory in 1919.

=== Career ===
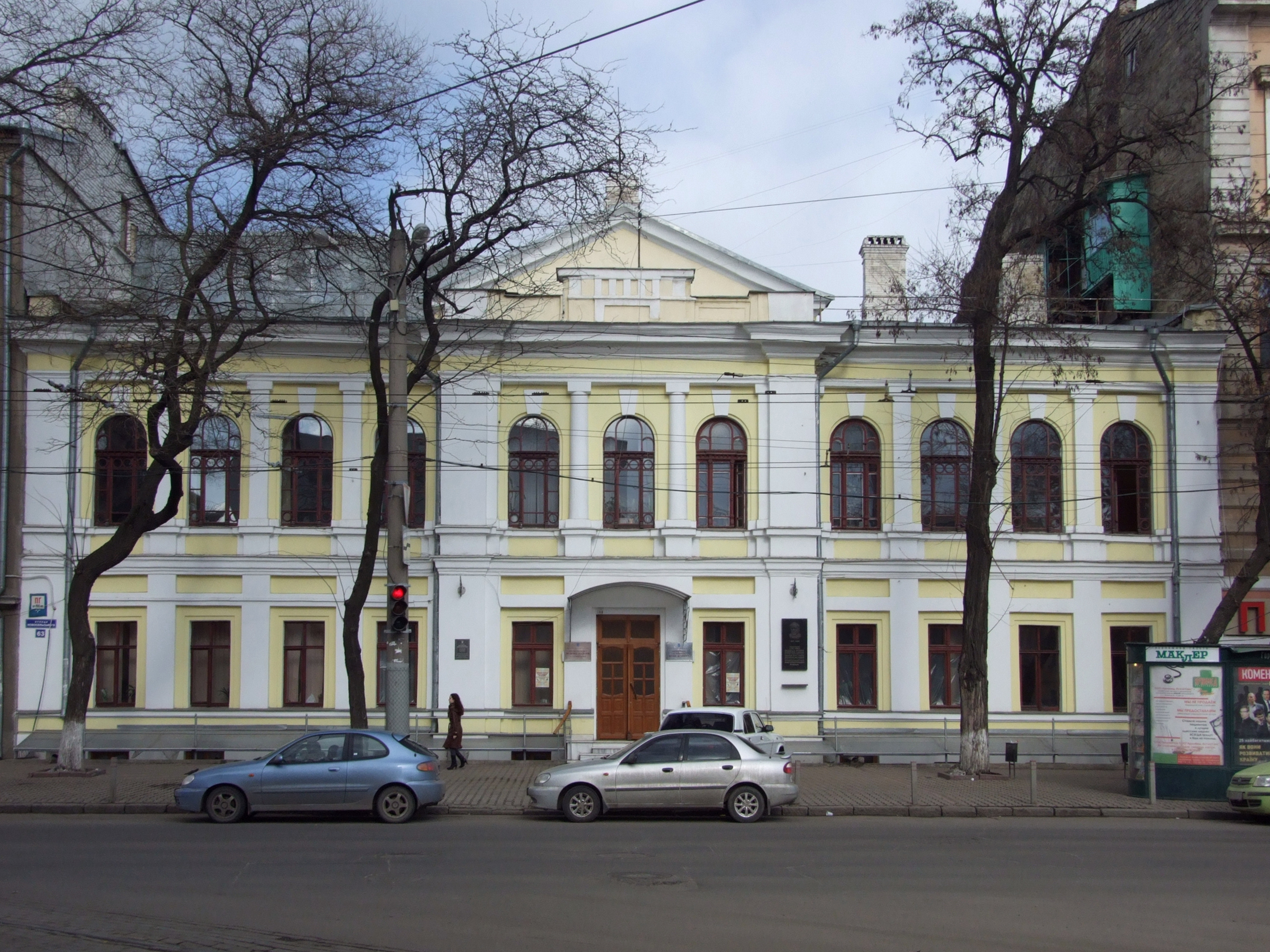
The Odesa Conservatory, where Vilinsky worked for the first two decades of his career

During his career Vilinsky lived and worked in Odesa and Kyiv, separated by a period during the Second World War during which he was evacuated to Tashkent. Along with his work as a composer and teacher, he wrote articles on Ukrainian and Moldovan music, and was a reviewer, a music critic, and an editor, when he oversaw the publication of the complete works of the Ukrainian composer Mykola Lysenko.

From 1920 to 1941, Vilinsky taught at the Odesa Conservatory, succeeding Maliszewski. At Odesa his talent developed and he gained recognition as a composer. In 1926 he was promoted to the rank of professor, and in 1931 he became the head of the department of composition. In 1935 he became the director of the Odesa regional organization of the Union of Composers of Ukraine, his deputies being two of his students, Serafim Orfeev and Leonid Gurov. Vilinsky was also a board member of the National Union of Composers of Ukraine.

In 1941, Vilinskyi and his family evacuated to Tashkent. Along with Lev Revutsky, he worked as a professor at the Tashkent Conservatory. He remained there until 1944, when he returned to Ukraine. During the war, the Romanian authorities in occupied Odesa succeeded in permanently acquiring a number of Vilinsky's compositions, as well family documents and part of his music library.

In 1944, Vilinsky returned to Ukraine and lived in Kyiv, where he chaired the composition department at the Kyiv Conservatory, a post he held until 1956. Vilinsky was made an Honoured Artist of the Ukrainian SSR in 1951; he was awarded the Order of Lenin in 1953. He was one of a trio of outstanding composers at the Kyiv Conservatory known as the "Three Mykolayovyches", which consisted of Vilinsky, Revutsky, and Borys Lyatoshynsky. (Note: The three composers' full names are Mykola Mykolayovych Vilinsky, Borys Mykolayovych Lyatoshynsky, and Lev Mykolayovych Revutsky.)

=== Students ===
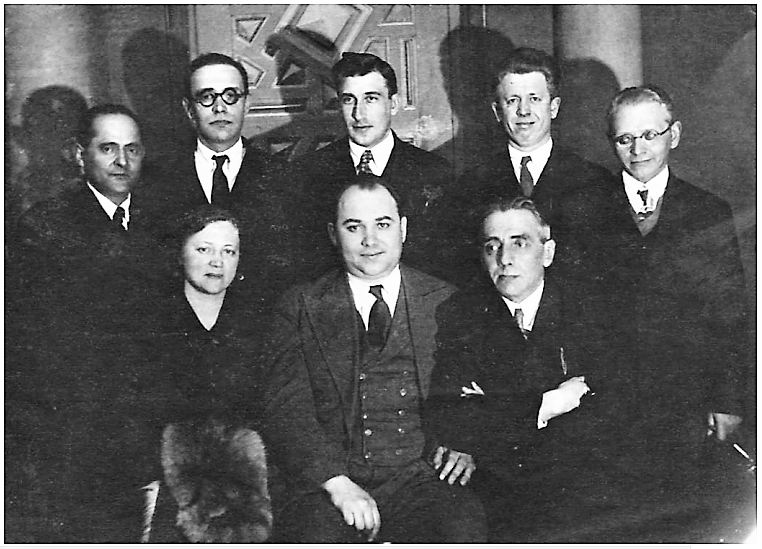
Vilinsky with some of his Odesa students: seated—Vilinskyi (right), Kostiantyn Dankevych (centre), Maria Zavalishina; standing—Serafim Orfeev (second from the right)

During the 1930s, world-renowned performers Emil and Elizabeth Gilels, David Oistrakh, Yakiv Zak, Maria Grinberg and other musicians studied the course of special harmony under Mykola Vilinsky. His composition students included Kostiantyn Dankevych, Oleksandr Bilash, Volodymyr Femilidi, Oscar Feltsman, Orfeev, Anton Mukha, Gurov, David Hershfeld, Maria Zavalishina, Albert Vodovozov, Yevhen Zubtsov, and Valentin Kucherov. Orfeev, who later became rector (principal) of the Odesa Conservatory wrote, "It seems that there was no composer in Odesa who did not consult with Mykola Mykolayovych.... and his advice was unconditionally accepted."

When Vilinsky realised that Dankevych had the potential to become a composer, he insisted that he attended composition classes. During the 1930s, Dankevych saved Vilinsky from the so-called "proletarian purge" at the Odesa Conservatory. After the Second World War, he regularly visited Vilinsky at his dacha in Vorzel, spending time discussing composition with him, or relaxing with the family. In 1951, when Dankevich was being persecuted for his opera Bogdan Khmelnytsky, Vilinsky defended Dankevich and supported him on his revision of the work. Vilinsky remained his mentor after his graduation from the Odesa Conservatory, and their friendship continued for decades until Vilinsky's death.

=== Family ===
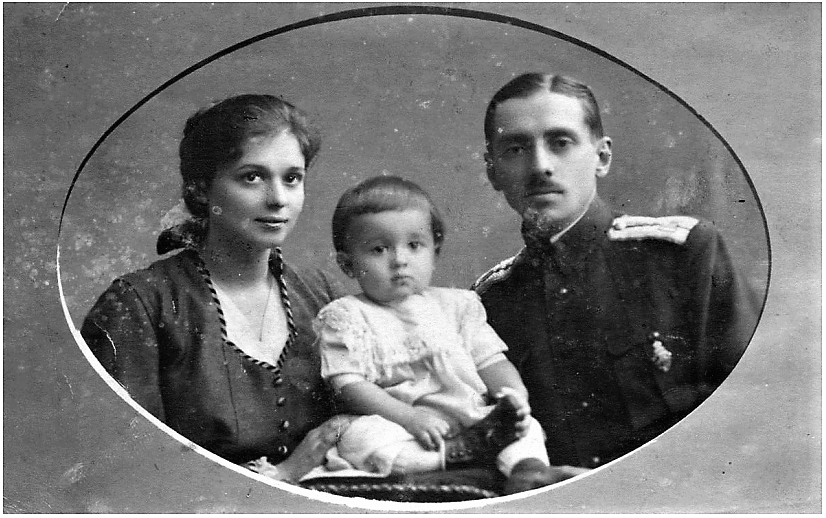
Vilinsky, with his wife Olena and their son Serhii, photographed in October 1917

Vilinski's son Serhii was born in 1916. When the Soviet Union was attacked by Nazi Germany in 1941, Vilinsky had the opportunity stop his son fighting on the front line, Serhil survived the war, having fought with the Red Army in Bessarabia, Caucasus, the Crimea, and Königsberg.

The composer's daughter Iryna Vilinska was a singing teacher who wrote songs, arrangements of folk songs, and music articles.

=== Death ===
Vilinsky died in Kyiv on 9 September 1956, and was buried in the Baikove Cemetery in Kyiv.

== Music ==
Vilinsky's artistic output included symphonic suites, cantatas, vocal and choral arrangements of Ukrainian, Russian and Moldovan folk music, chamber and instrumental works. He developed the traditions of the neo-romantic school of Rimsky-Korsakov, Glazunov and Anatoly Lyadov, using motifs linked with Ukraine and Moldova. One of the significant contributions to Moldovan academic music by Mykola Vilinsky is his Suite on Moldavian Themes

Vilinsky's early compositions have an elegiac style and contain bright impressionistic colouring. The composer's youthful works include miniatures without an opus: "Sad Song", "Mourning March", "Two Mazurkas", "Elegy", "Waltz", "March" (1905–1909), "Preludes No. 1 and No. 2" (1909, re-edited in 1949 and 1925). "Prelude for the left hand", and "Fugue" in B-flat minor.

Vilinsky composed skilfully with a style that was post-Romantic and greatly influenced by Ukrainian folk music. He was accomplished in orchestrating Ukrainian songs, which along with traditional Moldavian folk songs, individualized his style. The songs of Grandfather Spiridon, old Moldovan beggar Vilinsky's father had once assisted at a fair, went on to influence the young composer's interest in Moldovan folk music. Vilinsky helped develop the national musical culture of Moldova, travelling around its most remote areas and collecting songs and dance tunes.

== List of compositions ==
Data from National Union of Composers of Ukraine.

=== Orchestral works ===
- Characteristic Dances, suite for symphony orchestra, Op.1 (1910)
- Suite No. 1 on Moldovan folk songs for symphony orchestra, Op.16 (1932)
- Suite No. 2 on Moldavian themes for symphony orchestra, Op.17 (1933)
- Music for the film The Happiness of Being Young (Odesa Film Studio), Op.22 (1937)
- Suite No. 3 on themes of Moldovan folk songs for symphony orchestra, Op.28 (1944–1945)
- Ballet Suite in 4 movements for symphony orchestra, Op.41 (1956)

=== Music for brass band ===
- Departure March for brass band, Op.18 (1935)

=== Piano ===
- Fugue for piano, Op.2 (1913)
- Russian Variations in Epic Style for piano on an original theme, Op.3 (1914)
- A ballad in the form of variations for piano on a Ukrainian folk theme, Op.4 (1917–1925)
- Scherzo Etude for piano, Op.5 (1918)
- Elegy Suite – eight preludes for piano, Op.6 (1914–1918)
- Two pieces for piano: "Dream", "Thoughts" Op.7 (1926)
- Sonata for violin and piano, Op.10 (1929)
- Children's album – eight piano pieces for 4 hands, Op.11 (1925)
- Model variations for piano. A guide to the harmony course for student composers, Op.29 (1947)
- Variations on an original theme (D major) for piano, Op.33 – No.1 (1949); No. 2. (1949)
- Four miniatures in memory of A. Lyadov for piano, Op.40 (1951)
- Pieces for piano: Sad song, Funeral march, Two mazurkas, Elegy, Waltz, Tu-tu march. Prelude No. 1, Prelude No. 2, Prelude No. 3, Prelude for the left hand. No opus number (1961)

=== Choral music ===
- Moldova – a cantata for choir, soloists, symphony orchestra with words by L. Kornian, Op.21 (1937–1939)
- An arrangement of Shevchenko's Testament for choir and symphony orchestra, Op.24 (1939)
- An arrangement of the song The mountain stands tall for choir, soloists, symphony orchestra, Op.39 (1951)
- Songs to texts by Tychyna (manuscript not found, no opus number)

=== Songs ===
- Humoresque, four songs to words by Prutkov, Op.8 (1915, 1920)
- Arrangements of Moldovan folk songs for solo voice, choir and piano, Op. 14, 15, 18, 20, 28 (1930–1937)
- Arrangement of eight Moldavian folk songs for voice and piano, Op.25 (undated)
- Five arrangements of Uzbek folk songs for voice and piano, Op.26 (1942)
- Four arrangements of Moldovan folk songs for voice and piano, recorded by Borshch, Op.30 (undated)
- Arrangements of Ukrainian folk songs: "The sycamore stands above the water", "Oi verbo, verbo", "About Karmaluk", "Oh zhigune...", Op.31 (1949)
- Two arrangements of Russian folk songs: "Utes", "Ah, letyat utky...", Op.32 (1949)
- Three arrangements of Ukrainian folk songs: "In the cherry orchard", "Oh worlds, little moon", "It's raining", Op.35 (1950)
- Arrangement of Russian folk songs: "Down the Volga River" for bass and piano, Op.36 (1950)
- Two arrangements of Moldovan folk songs for voice and piano: "Hey, my cuckoo", "Tractor rule", Op37 (1951)
- Romances and songs to the words of Tolstoy: "Ushkuynyk", "Gryadoi klubitsya beloyu...", "Dreevtso moe mandalnoe", "Oh, if you could at least for one moment...", "Hurry up", "I kissed you", Maikov, "What a heavy dream", and Solovyov. "Bright stars are burning" to the words of M. Minsky.(No opus number) (1908–1913)
- "Singing a song tiredly" and "Behind the light is a shadow". words by O. Vilinsky. (No opus number, undated)
- Two romances to words by O. Vilinsky: "Lilac", "Everywhere you look - solemn space". (No opus number) (1925)
- Two songs to words by Pushkin: "To Chaadaev", "White-sided Dragonfly", (No opus number) (1937)

== Reputation and legacy ==
Vilinsky played a role in the rebirth of Ukrainian political and cultural identity from 1910 to 1932. He was a key figure to the process of developing Ukrainian piano music to have a clear Ukrainian style.”

Lyatoshynsky wrote of Vilinsky that "He was a wonderful musician and a wonderful person. All his works bear the stamp of true talent and all of them show the fine taste and great professional skill of the author. As for Mykola Mykolayovych as a person, everyone who even occasionally met him could not help but be convinced of his high mental qualities, which were manifested throughout his life."

Vilinsky edited some of Lysenko's piano works, published from 1952–1953.

== Sources ==
- Nazarenko, Valentyna Yuri; Vilinsky, Yu. S. (2016). "Композитор і педагог Микола Вілінський (1888–1956). Життя. Спогади. Роздуми" [Composer and teacher Mykola Vilinskyi (1888–1956). Life. Memoirs. Reflections]. Scientific Bulletin of the P. I. Tchaikovsky National Music Academy of Ukraine (114). Kyiv: 67–109.
- Sadie, Stanley, ed. (2001). "Vilinsky, Mykola Mykolayovych". The New Grove Dictionary of Music and Musicians. Vol. 26 (2nd ed.). Macmillan Publishers Limited – via Internet Archive.
- Struk, Danylo Husar, ed. (1984). "Vilinsky, Mykola". Encyclopedia of Ukraine. Vol. 5. Toronto: University of Toronto Press. p. 602. ISBN 0-8020-3995-2 – via Internet Archive.

=== Further reading ===
- Anisimov, Viktor (1938). "The composer M.M. Vilinsky (an essay on life and work)". Soviet Music (in Russian). Moscow. ISSN 0131-6818.
- Mykhaylov, M. (1962). M. M. Vilinsky: Soviet Composer (in Russian). Kyiv.
