= Hanna Havrylets =

Ukrainian composer (1958–2022)

Hanna Oleksiivna Havrylets Ганна Олексіївна Гаврилець Shevchenko National Prize laureate
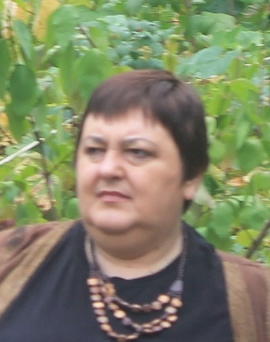

Background information
- Born: Hanna Oleksiivna Froliak; April 11, 1958; Vydyniv, Ukrainian SSR, Soviet Union
- Died: February 27, 2022 (aged 63) Kyiv, Ukraine
- Genre: Classical
- Occupations: Composer, music teacher
- Years active: 1984–2022

Hanna Oleksiivna Havrylets (Note: Ukrainian: Ганна Олексіївна Гаврилець, romanized: Hanna Oleksiivna Havrylets) (11 April 1958 – 27 February 2022, née Froliak) (Note: Ukrainian: Фроляк, romanized: Froliak) was a Ukrainian composer.

== Biography ==
She was born in Vydyniv, Ivano-Frankivsk Oblast, Ukrainian SSR and received her early music education in her native village from Vasyl Kufliuk. She graduated from the Lviv Conservatory in 1958 where she studied with Volodymyr Flys. She continued her studies at the Kyiv Conservatory with Myroslav Skoryk, which she completed in 1984.

In 1985, Havrylets became a member of the Composers' Union of Ukraine. She worked as a reviewer, and then took a position teaching at the Pyotr Tchaikovsky National Music Academy of Ukraine in 1992. She was awarded the Ukrainian Shevchenko National Prize in 1999 and became a Merited Artist of Ukraine in 2005.

Havrylets went on to obtain numerous prizes and win several competitions including the Ivanna and Marian Kots International Competition for Composers (1995), the "Spiritual Psalms of the Third Millennium" Competition (2001), the choral festival “The Gold-Domed Kyiv” (2001), the Vedelart prize "Kyiv" (2005), the Order of Princess Olga (2008), and the St. Volodymyr Order (2005).

In 2017, Havrylets was elected as a corresponding member of the National Academy of Arts of Ukraine.

Havrylets died in Kyiv on 27 February 2022, the third day of Russia's invasion of Ukraine, at the age of 63. She suffered from an aneurysm and was unable to get medical help in time due to the ongoing conflict.

== Selected works ==
Havrylets composed symphonic, chamber and choral works.

- Choral for string orchestra (2005)
- Stabat mater for mixed chorus and orchestra (2002)
- A-Corde, Sinfonietta for viola and string orchestra (2002)
- Pohlyad v dytynstvo (A Glimpse of Childhood), Chamber Cantata (1990)
- Piano Concerto (1982)
- Symphonic Poem (1983)
- Viola Concerto (1984)
- Symphony No. 1 (1989)
- Chamber Symphony No. 2 "In memoriam" (1995)
- Ėlegiya for string quartet (1981)
- Woodwind Quintet No. 1 (1984)
- Sonata for viola and piano (1988)
- Woodwind Quintet No. 2 (1990)
- Sax Quartet (1992)
- Rapsodiya-dialog for flute and piano (1993)
- Ekslibrysy for violin (1994)
- In B for saxophone (1995)
- Autumn Music for saxophone and piano (1996)
- String Quartet (1996)
