= Volodymyr Flys =

Volodymyr Vasylovych Flys Володимир Васильович Флис
- Born: March 23, 1924; Stanyslaviv, Ukrainian SFSR, Soviet Union (present-day Ivano-Frankivsk, Ukraine)
- Died: August 7, 1987 (aged 63) Lviv, Ukrainian SFSR, Soviet Union
- Genres: Classical
- Occupations: Composer, music educator

Volodymyr Vasylovych Flys (Note: Ukrainian: Володимир Васильович Флис, romanized: Volodymyr Vasylovych Flys) (March 23, 1924 – August 7, 1987) was a Ukrainian composer and music educator.

Flys was born in 1924 in Stanyslaviv (present-day Ivano-Frankivsk, Ukraine), and played piano and violin as a child. From 1932 to 1939 he studied at the Stanislaw Moniuszko Academy for violin and music theory, then briefly (6 months) at the Stern Conservatory in Berlin in 1943. Flys studied composition under Roman Simovych from 1945 until 1947. In 1947-55 he was arrested and lived in the Karaganda labour camp in Kazakhstan.

Upon his return to Lviv in 1957, Flys continued studying under Roman Simovych, graduating in 1961. That same year, Flyss taught composition and music at the M. Lysenko State Conservatory and was influential in the development of contemporary Ukrainian music. He composed mainly choral works. His notable students include composers Bohdana Frolyak and Hanna Havrylets'.

Flys died in 1987 in Lviv from an illness. He was unmarried and childless.
