= Mykola Arkas =

Ukrainian landscape composer and writer (1853–1909)

- Микола Аркас
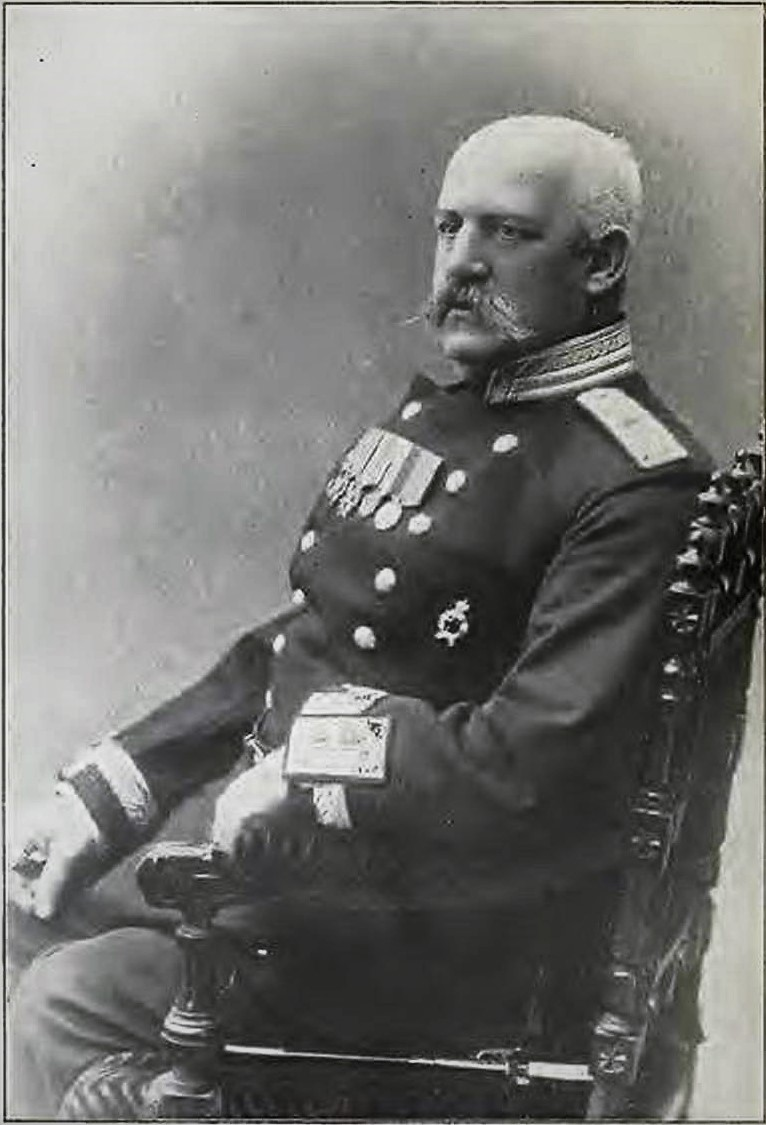
- Born: 7 January 1853; Mykolaiv, Russian Empire
- Died: 26 March 1909 (aged 56); Mykolaiv, Russian Empire
- Occupations: Composer; writer
- Notable work: Kateryna (opera)

Mykola Mykolayovych Arkas (Ukrainian: Микола Миколайович Аркас; 7 January 1853 [O.S. 26 December 1852] – 26 March [O.S. 13 March] 1909) was a Ukrainian composer, writer, historian, and cultural activist of Greek ancestry. In 1908, Arkas wrote History of Ukraine, first popular history of Ukraine published in Ukrainian. His most notable musical composition was the opera Kateryna.

== Biography ==
=== Background, family and education ===
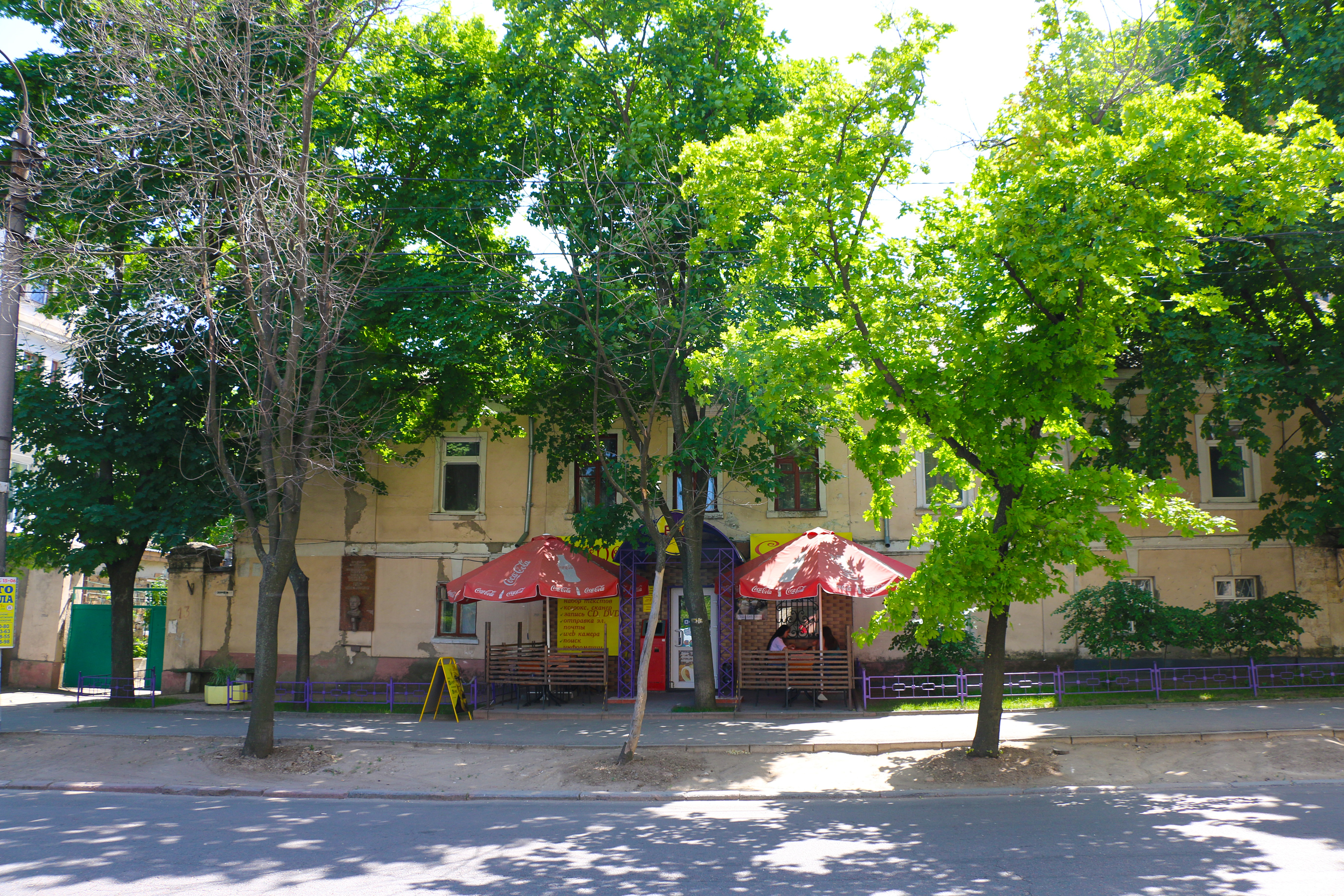
A 2015 photograph of the house in Mykolaiv where Mykola Arkas was born

Mykola Mykolayovych Arkas was born on 7 January 1853 [O.S. 26 December 1852], in Mykolaiv in the Russian Empire (now in Ukraine). His grandfather Andreas Arkas, the son of an Orthodox priest from the Greek city of Patras, was invited to teach classical languages and history at the Nikolayev Naval School in Saint Petersburg. He published the dictionaries for 12 languages, all of which he spoke. He moved with his family to Russia with the help of the Ecumenical Patriarchate of Constantinople.

Mykola Arkas was a son of the Russian admiral Nikolay Andreyevich Arkas, who was the Commander of the Black Sea Fleet, a founder of steam navigation and trade on the Black Sea and a founder of Caspian Sea Fleet, (1816–1881) and the Ukrainian Sophia Bogdanovich.

Mykola received his all-round education in the Law School of St. Petersburg and completed his studies in physics and mathematics at the University of Odessa.

=== Naval career and later life ===
After completing his studies (1875–1881), in accordance with the family tradition, he joined the Imperial Russian Navy, where from 1875 to 1899 he worked in the Naval Office in Mykolaiv .

Arkas obtained a magistracy in Kherson. In his leisure time, he collected and recorded folk songs, also studying the history of Ukraine. His teacher, Petro Nishchynsky, who was a Ukrainian composer, conductor, and writer, had an influence upon Mykola; the latter tried to master musical knowledge independently, to develop his composer's skills and writing music. On his Kherson estate in the villages of Khrystoforivka and Bohdanivka, Arkas set up and paid for, a Ukrainian-speaking school that closed by the government two years later.

Mykola Arkas died on 26 March 1909 [O.S. 13 March], in Mykolaiv, where he was buried in the family chapel in the town cemetery.

== Compositions and other cultural activities ==
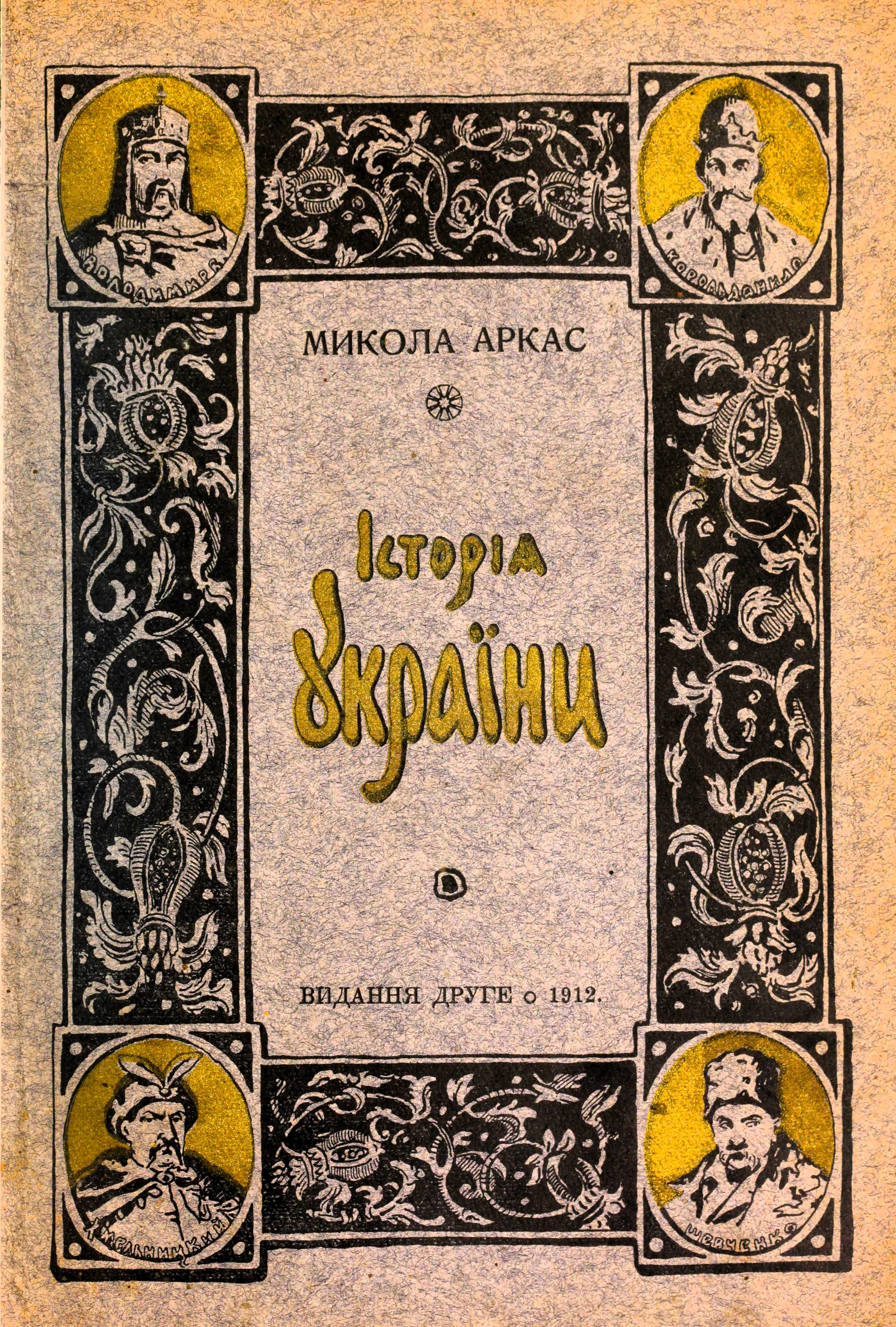
The title page of Arkas's History of Ukraine (2nd edition, 1912)

Arkas's artistic contributions include poetry, and about 80 compositions for solo-singing, vocal ensembles and arrangements of folk songs. He composed romances and duets.

Arkas was the founder and chairman of the "Prosvita" cultural and educational society in Mykolaiv. At his own expense he opened a public school that taught in Ukrainian, as the dominant teaching language in schools was Russian.

In 1908 in St. Petersburg, a book by Mykola Arkas — "History of Ukraine-Rus" — was published, under the editorship of Ukrainian writer Vasyl Domaniczky. It was the first popular history of Ukraine published in Ukrainian.

=== Kateryna (1890) ===
Arkas's opera Kateryna (1890) is the most significant work of Mykola Arkas, adapted as from Taras Shevchenko's poem of the same title. The opera was first performed in Moscow in 1899 by the Ukrainian composer and theatre director Marko Kropyvnytskyi. The piano–vocal score was first published in 1897. The work brought recognition to Mykola Arkas and became the first Ukrainian lyrical folk opera. Performances of "Kateryna" were a great success, first playing in Moscow by Mark Kropivnitskiy's troupe in 1899, and later in Minsk, Vilnius and Kiev.

== Commemoration ==
In October 1992, in Mykolaiv, there was open a monument to Mykola Arkas (by sculptor O.Zdykhovskiy). In 2003, a postage stamp was released in Ukraine dedicated to Mykola Arkas.

A biography about Arkas was written by the Ukrainian folklorist Leonid Sergeevič Kaufman in 1958.
