= Vasyl Pashchenko =

Ukrainian composer

Vasyl Pashchenko (Ukrainian: Васи́ль Па́щенко; Russian: Васи́лий Па́щенко; 1822–24 January (5 February) 1891) was a Ukrainian composer. He born in the village of Buda-Horobievska, Kiev Governorate, Russian Empire. He lived in Odesa. He composed works for piano (including the polonaises "On the Death of T. Shevchenko" (1861) and "Thought about Ukraine", a transcription of the Ukrainian folk song "I'm Going Across the Neman", a Bulgarian march, a waltz, a mazurka, and a polka), and romances that used Ukrainian folk music.

Pashchenko died on 5 February 1891 in a Ukrainian village in the Kiev Governorate. He was buried at the First Christian Cemetery, Odesa which was destroyed in 1937 when the authorities opened Ilyich Park. Some of his works are to be found in volume 5 of Ukrainian Piano Music (Kyiv, 1974).
