= Marian Hadenko =

Ukrainian composer, singer, and television presenter (1955–2021)

Marian Illich Hadenko Мар’ян Ілліч Гаденко
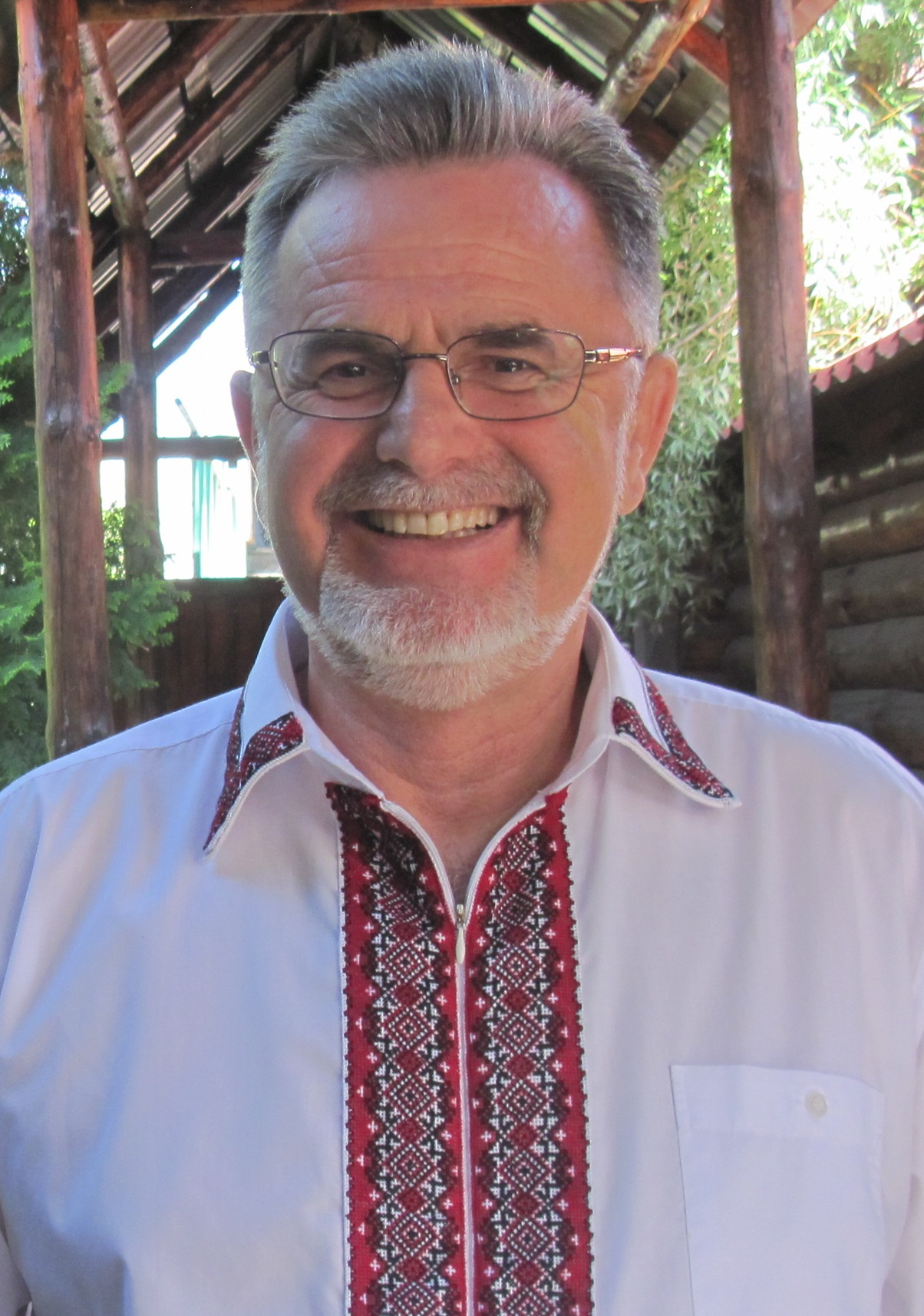
- Hadenko in 2014

Background information
- Born: September 15, 1955; Storozhynets, Ukrainian SSR, Soviet Union
- Died: December 3, 2021 (aged 66) Kyiv
- Occupations: Composer, singer, television presenter

Marian Illich Hadenko (Note: Ukrainian: Мар’ян Ілліч Гаденко, romanized: Marian Illich Hadenko) (15 September 1955 – 3 December 2021) was a Ukrainian composer, singer and television presenter. He was a recipient of the Merited Artist of Ukraine (1997) and the People's Artist of Ukraine (1999).

== Biography ==
He was born on September 15, 1955, in the town of Storozhynets near Chernivtsi. He spent his childhood and youth in Storozhynets, where he studied at a music school, and Chernivtsi (where he moved from Storozhynets after graduating from the 8th grade of secondary school No. 1).

After completing his military service in the Baltic Fleet of the USSR Navy, in 1977 he began his service in law enforcement agencies in Chernivtsi as an inspector for juvenile affairs.

During his service in the police, he graduated from Chernivtsi University in 1982 with a degree in economics.

After the death of TV presenter Tamara Shcherbatiuk, who was the author and host of the program "Nadvechirya", the program "Nadvechirya. Fates", hosted by Marian Hadenko, began airing.

In recent years, he worked, created and lived in Kyiv. He died in Kyiv on the morning of December 3, 2021, of a heart attack. He was buried on December 5, 2021, in Storozhynets next to the grave of his son Volodymyr.

== Awards ==
- Merited Artist of Ukraine (1997)
- People's Artist of Ukraine (1999)
- Order of Merit 3d class (2006)
- Order of Merit 2d class (2015)
