= Radu Paladi =

Romanian composer and conductor (1927–2013)

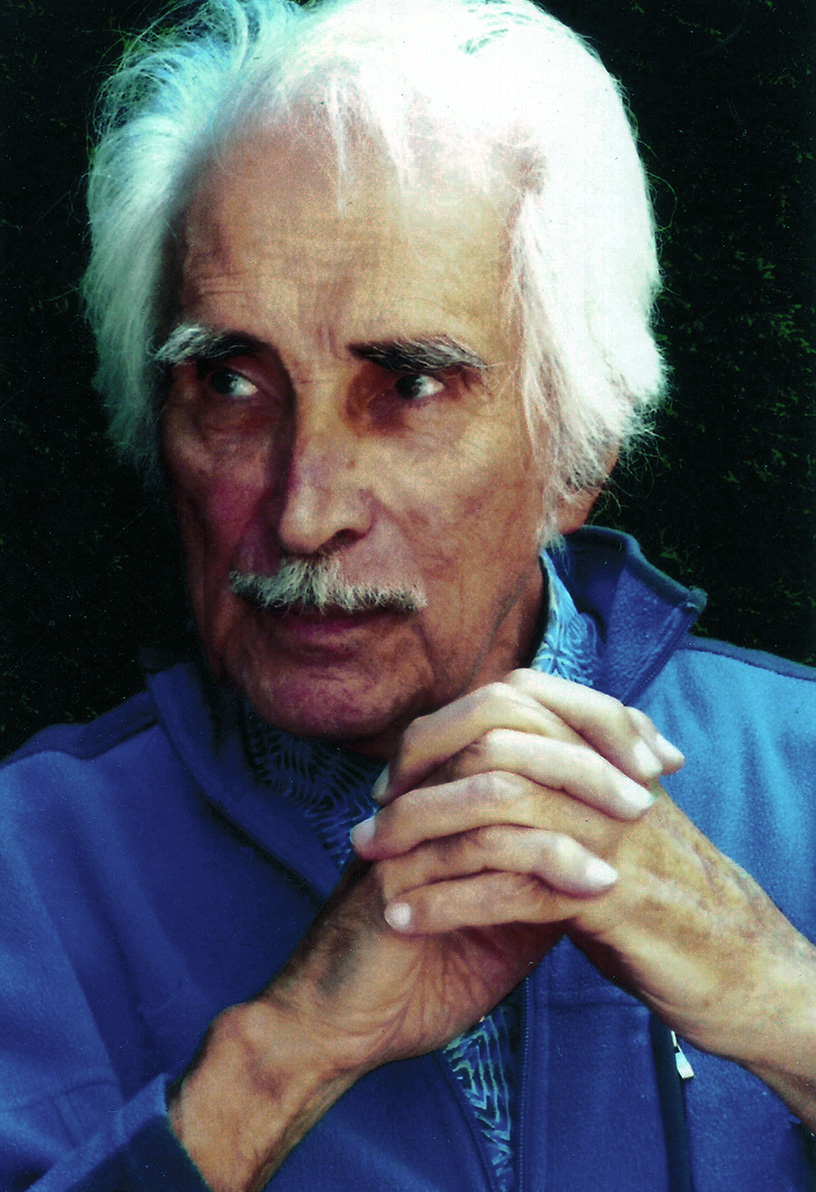
- Born: 16 January 1927; Storojineț, Kingdom of Romania
- Died: 30 May 2013 (aged 86); Bucharest, Romania
- Education: National University of Music Bucharest
- Occupations: Composer; pianist; conductor
- Employer: Caragiale National University of Theatre and Film

Radu Paladi (16 January 1927 – 30 May 2013) was a Romanian composer, pianist, and conductor. His compositions include stage and film music, choral works, vocal music and vocal-symphonic works, chamber music, symphonic music as well as concertos.

== Education ==
Paladi was born on 16 January 1927 in Storojinet. He studied piano under Titus Tarnavski at the Cernăuți Conservatory (at that time in Romania, now in Chernivtsi, Ukraine) from 1941 until 1943. Between 1947 and 1956, he studied piano with Florica Musicescu, composition with Leon Klepper, harmony with Paul Constantinescu and instrumentation with Theodor Rogalski at the Royal Academy of Theatre and Music, later known as the Ciprian Porumbescu Conservatory in Bucharest.

== Teaching ==
Paladi started his teaching career from 1954 until 1963 as an assistant and continued from 1963 until 1996 as a lecturer at the Caragiale National University of Theatre and Film in Bucharest.

== Artistic career ==
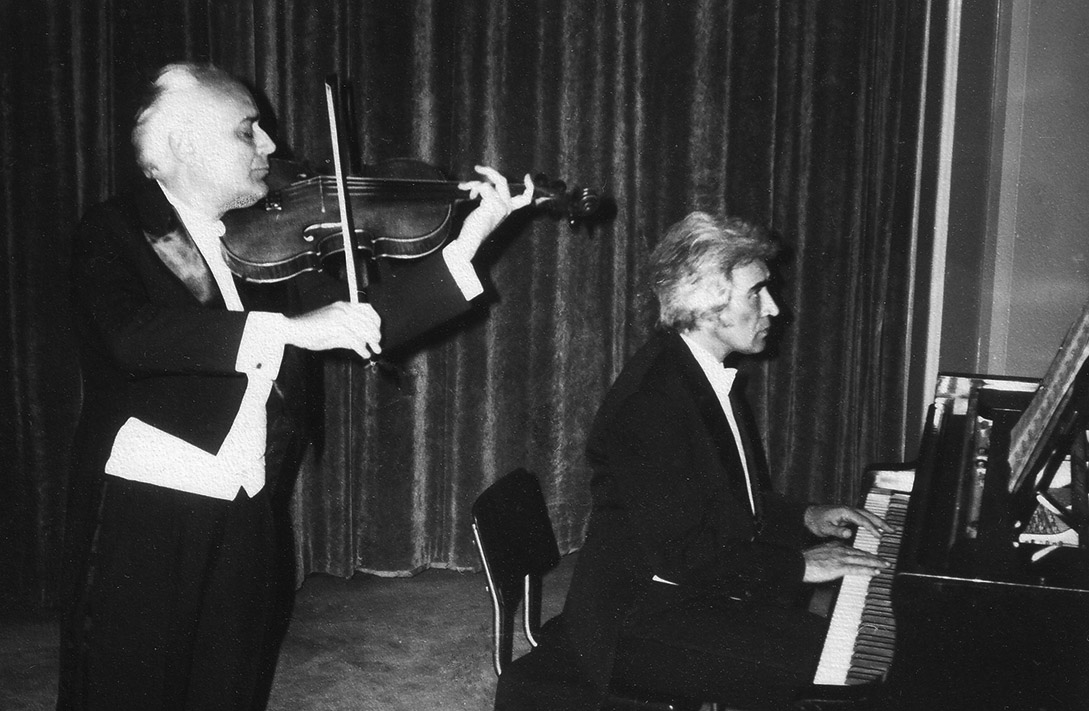
Radu Paladi (right) with George Popovici

Paladi was a member of the Association of Romanian Composers and Musicologists since its foundation in 1949. He performed as a pianist in song recitals and chamber music in Romania, Spain, and Germany. As a soloist in his own piano concerto, Paladi played with various Romanian orchestras, e.g., the Iași "Moldova" Philharmonic Orchestra on the occasion of the first performance of this work, with the Botoșani Philharmonic Orchestra, and with the National Radio Orchestra in Bucharest, with whom he recorded his piano concerto. From 1969 to 1972, Paladi worked as a conductor and artistic director of the Philharmonic Orchestra in Botoșani. Apart from being busy conducting numerous Romanian amateur choirs and vocal ensembles, he was a frequent judge at various national contests of vocal and instrumental music as well as composition contests.

Paladi died on 30 May 2013 in Bucharest.

== Honours and awards ==
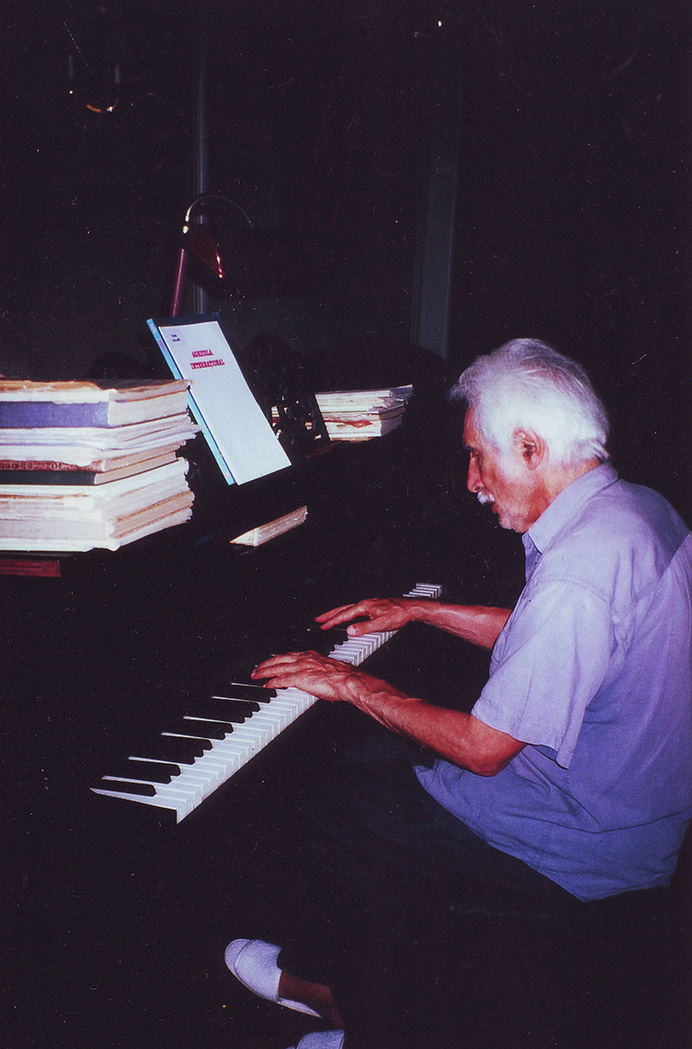
Paladi playing the piano

- First prize at the National Composition Contest in Bucharest (1951)
- First prize and awarded the gold medal at the International Composition Contest in Moscow for the cantata "Dar de nuntă" ("Wedding Present") for mixed choir and orchestra (1957)
- Third prize at the Moscow International Contest for his string quartet no. 1 (1957)
- Medal of Work third class (1959) and Order of Cultural Merit third class (1968)
- Award of the Romanian Association of Composers and Musicologists (1974, 1976, 1978, 1979, 1981, 1984, 1986, 1987, 1988, 1993, 1996)
- 23rd-of-August Medal (1979)
- Award of the Romanian Academy (1980)
- National Order of Merit, Knight rank (2000)
- Award of Excellence of the Romanian Association of Composers and Musicologists (2002)
- Grand award of the Romanian Association of Composers and Musicologists to honour the composer's life's work (2007)

== Musical works ==
=== Stage music ===
- Pălăria Florentină (A Florentine Hat), 1957
- Sălbatecii (The Savages), 1958
- Școala Calomniei (The School of Calumny), 1961
- D-ale Carnavalului (Carnival Hustle and Bustle), 1962

=== Film music ===
- Fluierașul fermecat (The Little Magic Flute), animated cartoon, directed by Pascal Rădulescu and Constantin Popescu (1957)
- Ciulinii Bărăganului (The Thistles of the Bărăgan), directed by Louis Daquin (1957)
- La porțile pământului (At the Gates of the Earth), directed by Geo Saizescu (1965)
- Pe drumul Thaliei (On Thalia's Way), (1965)

=== Choral works ===
- More than 200 works for mixed chorus a cappella, for choir and piano, for choir and orchestra
- 60 colinde (among them Christmas carols and Easter chants) for mixed chorus a cappella based on the collections of Béla Bartók, George Breazul, and Gheorghe Cucu (1990–1995)
- 12 poems for mixed chorus a cappella based on verses by Mihai Eminescu (1988–1992)

=== Vocal music ===
- 8 songs for soprano and piano
- 4 duets for soprano, bass-baritone, and piano
- 13 songs for bass-baritone and piano

=== Works for piano ===
- Suite for piano (1940)
- Theme with variations (1950)
- Rondo a capriccio (1954)
- Prelude and fugue (1955)
- Cadence for the piano concerto in C minor, K. 491 of W.A. Mozart (2011)

=== Chamber music ===
- String quartet no. 1 in C minor (1955)
- Wind quintet (1998)
- String quartet no. 2 (2013)

=== Vocal symphonic works ===
- Cantata "Dar de nuntă" (Wedding Present), 1957
- Oratorio "Oratoriul Eliberării" (Oratorio of Liberation), 1959
- Cantata "Poem de slavă" (Poem of Fame), 1964

=== Symphonic music ===
- Symphonic suite "Fluierașul fermecat" (The Little Magic Flute), 1954
- Symphonic suite "Sălbatecii" (The Savages), 1958
- Symphonic suite "Ciulinii Băragănului" (The Thistles of the Bărăgan), 1957

=== Concertos ===
- Concerto for piano and orchestra in C major (1989)
- Concerto for violin and orchestra in E minor (2002)

=== CD Recordings ===
- Quartetto per archi nr. 1, Quartetto Academica, prodotto della Dynamic s.r.l. Genova, 1979
- 2 Colinde: "Dimineața di Crăciunu", "Colo sus la răsăritu", Corul Academic Radio, dirijor Aurel Grigoraș, UCMR-ADA 1523011 Editura Casa Radio, 2001
- 2 Colinde, Corul Academic Radio, dirijor Aurel Grigoraș, Producător: Editura Muzicală UCMR, 2005
- "De ce nu-mi vii?", Corul Academic Radio, în: Antologia Muzicii românești, Creații corale românești nr. 1, Producător: UCMR-ADA 2A 18481
- "Noapte de vară", Corul Academic Radio, dirijor Aurel Grigoraș, în: Antologia Muzicii românești, Creații corale românești nr. 2, Production: UCMR-ADA 031.076050
- "Atât de fragedă", Corul Academic Radio, dirijor Dan Mihai Goia, în: Antologia Muzicii românești, Creații corale românești nr.9, Production: UCMR-ADA RO9AF125012655
- 2 Colinde: "Dimineața di Crăciunu", "Colo sus la răsăritu", Corul Academic Radio în: Antologia Muzicii românești, Creații corale românești nr. 10, Production: UCMR-ADA RO9AF105012464, 2009
- String Quartet no. 1 in C minor, Lupot String Quartet, ars sonandi, 2015
- Streichquartett Nr. 1 c-Moll, Martfeld Quartett, Coviello Classics, 2016 COV91607

== Works published in print ==
- Suita pentru pian (piano suite) Editura de Stat, București, 1951 (out of print)
- Suita pentru pian (piano suite), Editura de Stat pentru literatură și artă, București, 1954 (out of print)
- Suita pentru pian (piano suite), Editura Muzicală, București 1968 (out of print)
- Suita pentru pian (piano suite, fragment)in: Rumänische Klavierminiaturen, Leipzig, Peters Verlag, 1976
- Rondo a capriccio, Editura Muzicală a Uniunii Compozitorilor din România, București, 1953 (out of print)
- Rondo a capriccio, Editura Muzicală a Uniunii Compozitorilor din România, București, 1954 (out of print)
- Cvartet de coarde nr. 1 do minor (string quartet no. 1 in C minor), Editura Muzicală, București, 1960 (out of print)
- Coruri (Choruses), Editura de Stat pentru literatură și artă, București, 1956 (out of print)
- Cântece și Coruri (chants and choruses), Editura Muzicală a Uniunii Compozitorilor din România, București, 1967 (out of print)
- Poem de slavă pentru tenor, soliști, cor mixt și orchestră, pe versuri de Corneliu Șerban (Poem of Fame for tenor, soloists, mixed chorus and orchestra based on verses of Corneliu Șerban), Editura Muzicală a Uniunii Compozitorilor din România, București, 1968 (out of print)
- Două piese pentru cor și orchestră pe versuri de Vlaicu-Bârna (two pieces for choir and orchestra based on verses of Vlaicu-Bârna), Editura Muzicală, București, 1975
- Dar de Nuntă, Cantată pentru cor mixt și orchestră pe versuri de Ion Serebreanu (Wedding Present, cantata for mixed chorus and orchestra based on verses of Ion Serebreanu), Editura Muzicală, București, 2003
- Dar de Nuntă, reducție pentru pian (Wedding Present, piano score), Editura Muzicală, București, 2003
- 8 Lieduri pentru soprană și pian (8 songs for soprano and piano), Editura Muzicală, București, 2013
- Concert pentru vioară și orchestră (concerto for violin and orchestra), Editura Muzicală, București, 2014
- Cvintet de suflători (wind quintet), Editura Muzicală, București, 2014
- Lieduri și Duete pentru voci grave, medii, înalte și pian (songs and duets for deep, middle and high voices and piano), Editura Muzicală, București, 2014
- 12 Poeme pe versuri de Mihai Eminescu (12 poems based on verses of Mihai Eminescu), Editura Muzicală, București, 2014
- Cvartet de coarde nr. 2 (string quartet no. 2), Editura Muzicală, București, 2014
- Concert pentru pian și orchestră (concerto for piano and orchestra), Editura Muzicală, București, 2015
- Cvartet de coarde nr. 1 do minor (string quartet no. 1 C minor), Editura Muzicală, București, 2017

== Literature ==
- Cosma, Viorel: Muzicieni români, Lexicon, Ed. Muzicală, București 1970
- Popovici, Doru: Radu Paladi, Poeme corale pe versuri de Mihai Edminescu, revista Muzica 6, nr. 3 1995
- Popovici, Doru: Radu Paladi, Colindele pentru cor a cappella, revista Muzica 8, nr. 1
- Zbarcea, Veronica: Radu Paladi, Spiritul compozitorului, revista Radio România nr. 259, 14 ianuarie 2002
- Codreanu, Petre: Radu Paladi, Concertul pentru vioară și orchestră, programul Filarmonicii George Enescu, 15 februarie 2007
- Scurtulescu, Dan: Radu Paladi, din nou, revista Actualitatea muzicală nr. 4, aprilie 2007
- Manea, Carmen: Concertul pentru pian de Radu Paladi, revista Modele umane și repere profesionale, Colecția AkadeMusica nr. 4, Ed. UNMB 2012
- Alexandrescu, Ozana: Radu Paladi, Concert pentru pian și orchestră, programul Filarmonicii George Enescu, 8 decembrie 2016
- Dediu, Dan: Radu Paladi - o evocare, revista Actualitatea muzicală nr. 6, iunie 2013
- Stäbler, Marcus: Rezension der CD des Martfeld Quartetts (2015), FonoForum, 9/2016, S. 51
- Kneipel, Eberhard: Rezension der CD des Martfeld Quartetts (2015), Das Orchester, 12/2016, S. 72
