= Roman Hurko =

American-Canadian composer

Roman Hurko is a New York based composer who specializes in Byzantine Rite Music.

== Biography ==
=== Early life ===
Roman Hurko is an American-Canadian of Ukrainian descent, born in Toronto, Canada (1962). A graduate of The Yale Institute of Sacred Music (Master of Arts and Religion) and The University of Toronto (B.A. Music History and Theory), he has also studied composition privately with composer Father Ivan Moody in Portugal.

He has been a member of the Composers' Union of Ukraine since 2004.

Hurko began composing music while still in high school. His first composition "Ave Maria" for SATB choir was premiered by the Toronto Mendelssohn Youth Choir, at the Guelph Spring Festival in 1983, with the composer conducting.

In the summers of 1983 and 1985 he attended choral conducting seminars led by Wolodymyr Kolesnyk, former director of the National Opera of Ukraine. In the fall of 1985, he co-founded the St. Evtymyj Youth Choir at St. Nicholas Ukrainian Catholic Church in Toronto. Hurko soon began setting sections of the liturgy for the choir, and in 1999 completed and recorded the entire Divine Liturgy of St. John Chrysostom in commemoration of the second millennium of Christianity.

=== Career ===
Along with composition, Hurko has a career in Opera Stage Direction. A former member of the Canadian Opera Company (COC) ensemble, he worked as staff assistant director at the COC from 1988-93. After freelancing as an assistant director in Europe and the US (Royal Opera House in Covent Garden, Salzburg Festival, De Nederlandse Opera, Opéra de Monte-Carlo, Teatro de la Zarzuela, The Washington Opera) he made his stage directing debut in 1996 at the Spoleto Festival (Italy) with Handel's Semele. In Spoleto, he co-directed Prokofiev's War and Peace together with festival founder and composer, Gian Carlo Menotti. Most recently, he directed Mozart's Don Giovanni and Wagner's The Flying Dutchman at the Vancouver Opera.

During this period he composed incidental music for two plays with the Yara Arts Group at La Mama Experimental Theater Club in New York City: A Light From the East (1991) and Explosions (1993).

Hurko has composed and recorded 5 major pieces of sacred music: Liturgy 2000, Panachyda/Requiem for the Victims of Chernobyl (2001), Liturgy No.2 (2003), and Vespers (2005). His latest recording, Liturgy No.3, an English language setting of the Divine Liturgy of St. John Chrysostom, was recorded in Chicago with the Schola Cantorum of St. Peter the Apostle (J. Michael Thompson, conductor), and will be released in the fall of 2011. Liturgy 2000 was premiered in Chicago by the Schola Cantorum of St. Peter the Apostle, conducted by J. Michael Thompson, at Sts. Volodymyr and Olha's Ukrainian Catholic Church on July 14, 2000. Requiem/Panachyda, "Chornobyl Requiem" dedicated to the memory of the victims of the nuclear disaster, received its premiere at St. Michael's Golden-Domed Monastery in Kyiv, on April 26, 2001 (the 15th anniversary of the disaster), with the composer conducting the Frescoes of Kyiv Chamber Choir. A subsequent recording of the Requiem received its broadcast debut in April 2003 on the Canadian Broadcasting Corporation (CBC) Radio 2 programme "Choral Concert".

Selections from Liturgy No. 2 were given their North American premiere by the Elmer Iseler Singers at concerts in Ottawa and Toronto, conducted by Lydia Adams. In September 2005, Vespers was premiered in Kyiv's Pecherska Lavra (Monastery of the Caves) by the Vydubychi Church Choir (Volodymyr Viniar, conductor), as the opening concert to the 16th KyivFest International Music Festival.

On April 9, 2006, the Requiem was performed in concert at Toronto's Roy Thomson Hall by the combined: Elmer Iseler Singers, Orpheus Choir, Amadeus Choir, the Vesnivka Women's Choir, and the Ukrainian Male Chamber Choir in a concert to solemnly mark the 20th anniversary of the Chernobyl nuclear disaster. This concert was subsequently broadcast on April 26 (the 20th anniversary of the disaster) on the CBC Radio 2 programme: "In Performance", and again on Sunday, May 14 on "Choral Concert".

Many of Hurko's recordings have received their US broadcast premiere on Princeton Radio's "Classical Discoveries" program (103.3 FM), hosted by Marvin Rosen. Most recently, Roman has become involved in a series of recordings entitled "The Ukrainian Art Song Project" as producer. The goal of the project is to record the complete art songs of Ukraine's major composers. Volume 1 of the series, The Complete Art Songs of Kyrylo Stetsenko (1882–1922) was recorded during the summer of 2006 by Pavlo Hunka, Bass and Albert Krywolt, piano on Toronto's Musica Leopolis label. Also featured on the recording are Russell Braun, Baritone and Benjamin Butterfield, tenor. The recording was launched on September 14, 2006 at the new Four Season's Opera House in Toronto. Volume 2, The Complete Art Songs of Mykola Lysenko (1842–1912) was launched on December 5, 2010 at Toronto's Koerner Hall. Volume 3, The Complete Art Songs of Yakiv Stepovyi (1883–1921) was released on February 6, 2011 at Edmonton's Winspear Center. Galicians I, the art songs of Denys Sichynsky, Stanyslav Liudkevych, Vasyl Barvinsky, and Stefania Turkewich were launched on November 2, 2014 at Koerner Hall in Toronto.
