= Storozhynets =

City in Chernivtsi Oblast, Ukraine

Storozhynets Сторожинець Storojineț
- City
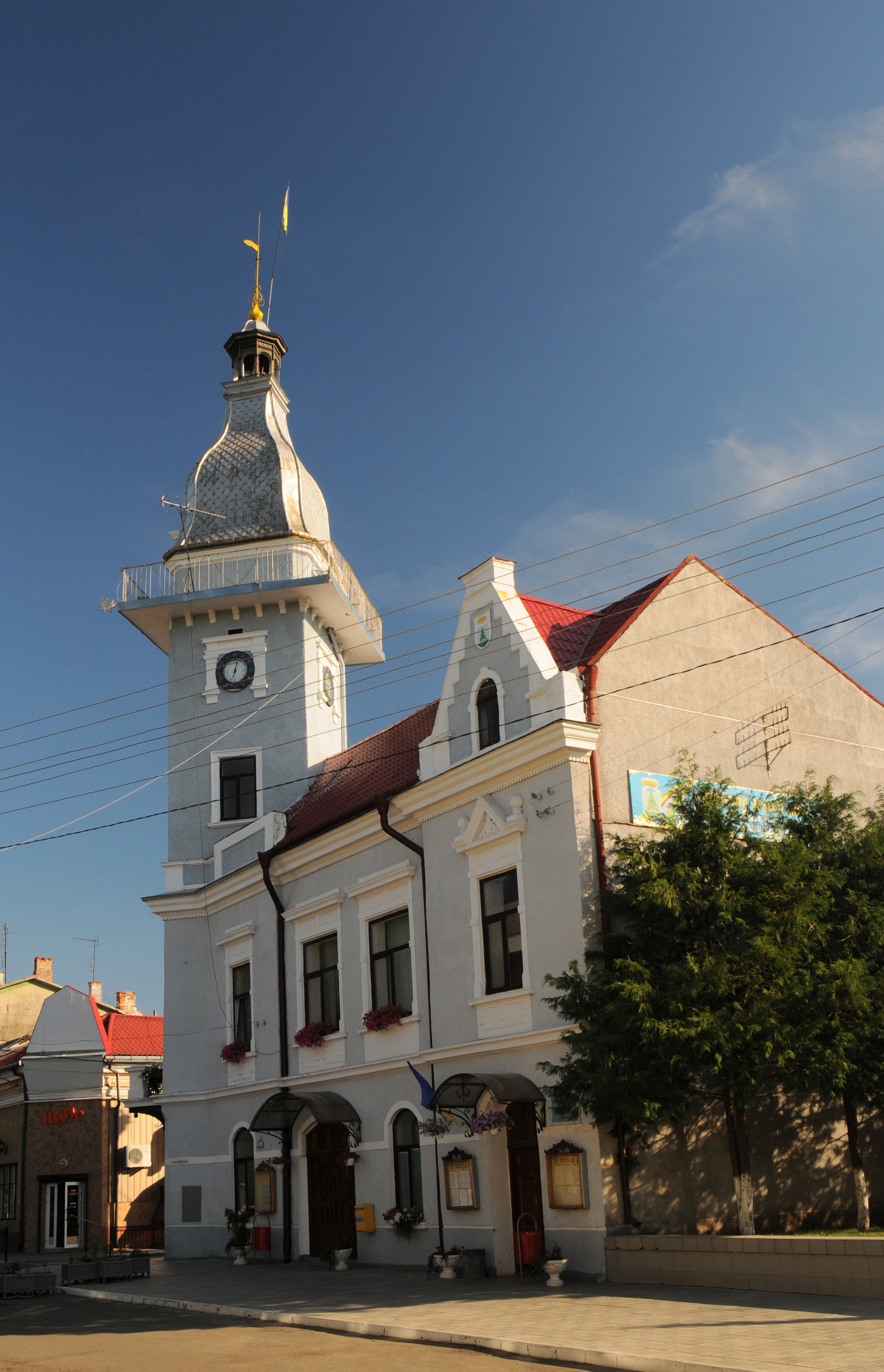
- City hall

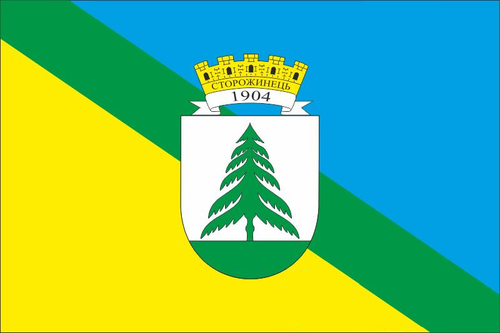
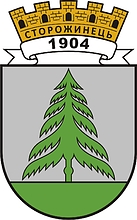
- Flag Coat of arms
- Interactive map of Storozhynets
- Location within Chernivtsi Oblast Location within Ukraine
- Coordinates: 48°09′43″N 25°43′12″E
- Country: Ukraine
- Oblast: Chernivtsi Oblast
- Raion: Chernivtsi Raion
- Hromada: Storozhynets urban hromada
- First mention: 1448

Government
  - Mayor: Iryna Poraïko

Area
  - Total: 58 km^{2} (22 sq mi)
- Elevation: 366 m (1,201 ft)

Population (2022)
  - Total: 14,077
  - Density: 2,501/km^{2} (6,480/sq mi)
- Time zone: UTC+2 (EET)
  - Summer (DST): UTC+3 (EEST)
- Postal code: 59000 — 59004
- Area code: +380 3735

Storozhynets (Ukrainian: Сторожинець, IPA: [storoʒɪˈnɛtsʲ]; Romanian: Storojineț; see below for other names) is a small city located in Chernivtsi Raion, Chernivtsi Oblast of western Ukraine, north of the border with Romania. It hosts the administration of Storozhynets urban hromada, one of the hromadas of Ukraine. It is located approximately 20 km (12 mi) southwest of the oblast capital, Chernivtsi. Population: 14,077 (2022 estimate).

Storozhynets is located in the historic region of Bukovina, which has been governed by Moldavia (before 1774), the Austrian empire (1774–1918), Romania (1918–1940 and 1941–1944), the USSR (1940–1941 and 1944–1991) and Ukraine (since 1991).

== Other names ==
Other names for the city include:

- Storozynetz (German)
- Storojineț (Romanian)
- Strozhnitz (סטראָזשניץ, Yiddish)
- Storožynec (Slovak)
- Storożyniec (Polish)
- Storozhinets (Сторожинец, Russian)
- Flondoreni (Romanian) - proposed name never officially changed, after the Flondor family, who were some of the most influential nobles, benefactors, for the Romanians in Bukovina

== History ==
Storozhynets was a part of the Principality of Moldavia and was first mentioned in 1448. The first inhabitants were a settlement of loggers. In 1774, the region was annexed by Austria, as the Duchy of Bukovina. It was marked with great changes as Austrians and Germans arrived en masse. There were schools with German, Romanian, and Ukrainian as their languages of instruction.

Since the second half of the 19th century, a rapid population growth began with the arrival of Jews to the city, as well as Hungarian and Romanian businessmen, legal and banking officials, most of whom were Jews. In 1854 Storozhynets received the status of city. By the end of the 19th century and early 20th century, the city was populated mainly by Jews.

In 1903 in Storozhynets opened a private school. On May 21, 1904, the area around Storozhynets became a county. Trade, industry, agriculture, science, education, and culture developed at a rapid pace. On 15/28 November 1918, soon after the end World War I, the Union of Bukovina with Romania was declared by the General Congress of Bukovina, and the town became part of the Kingdom of Romania. On 18 December 1918, Storojineț County was created, with Storojineț as its capital. In 1921, Romanian became the official language, and the Ukrainian language was not used any more in the administration.

On 28 June 1940, Northern Bukovina was occupied by Soviet troops. After the start of the war against the Soviet Union, in June 1941, Northern Bucovina was reintegrated into the Kingdom of Romania. Almost all the Jews were deported to Transnistria by the Romanian authorities in 1941, and a large majority of them died there. In 1944, the area passed again under Soviet control.

Until 18 July 2020, Storozhynets served as an administrative center of Storozhynets Raion. The raion was abolished in July 2020 as part of the administrative reform of Ukraine, which reduced the number of raions of Chernivtsi Oblast to three. The area of Storozhynets Raion was merged into Chernivtsi Raion.

== Demographics ==
=== 1930 Romanian census ===
1930 Romanian census
Ethnicity	Population	Percentage of Total Population
Romanians	3,390	38.98%
Jews	2,480	28.52%
Poles	1,017	11.69%
Ruthenians/Ukrainians	853	9.81%
Germans	655	7.53%
TOTAL:	8,695	100%

=== 2001 Ukrainian census ===
In 2001, 81% of the inhabitants spoke Ukrainian as their native language, while 11.45% spoke Romanian, and 6.56% spoke Russian. In 2001, the population of 14,523 was 74.31% ethnically Ukrainian, 17.23% Romanian, 4.91% Russian, 2.2% Polish and 0.49% Moldovan. In 1989, there were 14,033 inhabitants, mostly ethnic Ukrainians, but also 3,214 Romanians (22.90%) and 129 Moldovans (0.92%).

Ethnic groups in Storozhynets
	percent
Ukrainians	74.31%
Romanians	17.23%
Russians	4.91%
Poles	2.20%
Moldovans	0.49%
Belarusians	0.20%
Germans	0.11%
Armenians	0.10%
others	0.45%

Native languages (2001)
	percent
Ukrainian	81.0%
Romanian	11.4%
Russian	6.6%
Polish	0.8%
Armenian	0.1%
others	0.1%

== Notable people ==
- Iancu Flondor (1865–1924), Romanian politician who advocated Bukovina's union with the Kingdom of Romania.
- George Grigorovici (1871–1950), Romanian politician
- Radu Paladi (1927–2013), Romanian composer, pianist, and conductor.
- Viorica Viscopoleanu (born 1939), Romanian long jumper athlete
- Rabbi Shulem Gershon Ginsburgh the last Rabbi of Strozhnitz, he was the son in law of Rabbi Yisroel Yaakov of Chust.
- Grand Rabbi Yisochor Ber Rosenbaum of Strozhnitz, author of Divrei Yisochor (d. 1980), son of Rabbi Issomor Rosenbaum of Nadvorna, son-in-law of Rabbi Yisachar Bertchi Leifer of Nadvorna-Satmar.
- Rabbi Yitschok Yaakov Dovid Hager of Strozhnits, son of Imrei Boruch of Vizhnitz.
- Marian Hadenko, Ukrainian composer, singer and television presenter
- Valeriy Tsybukh, Ukrainian politician and diplomat.

== Gallery ==
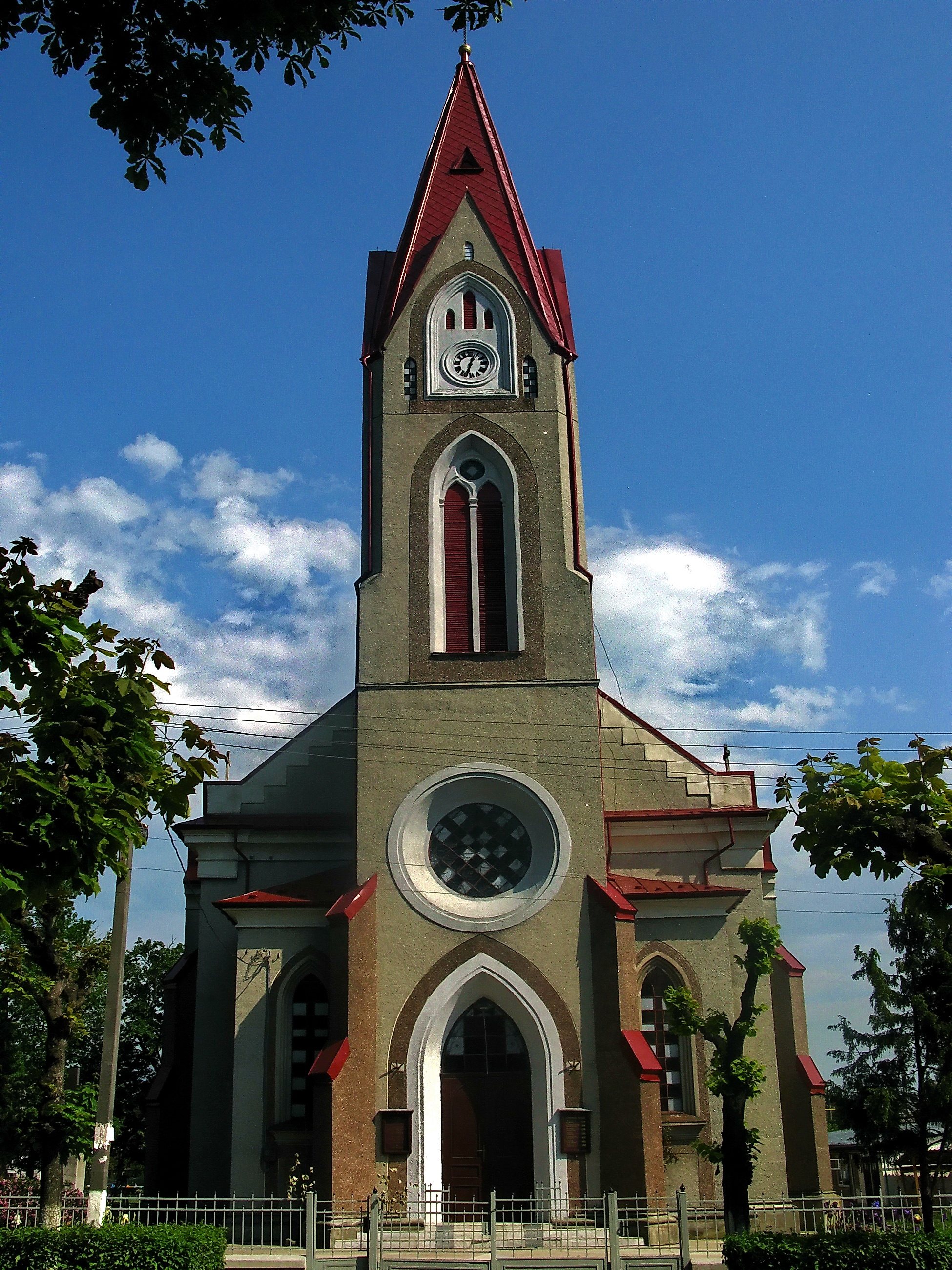
Saint Anne's Catholic Church

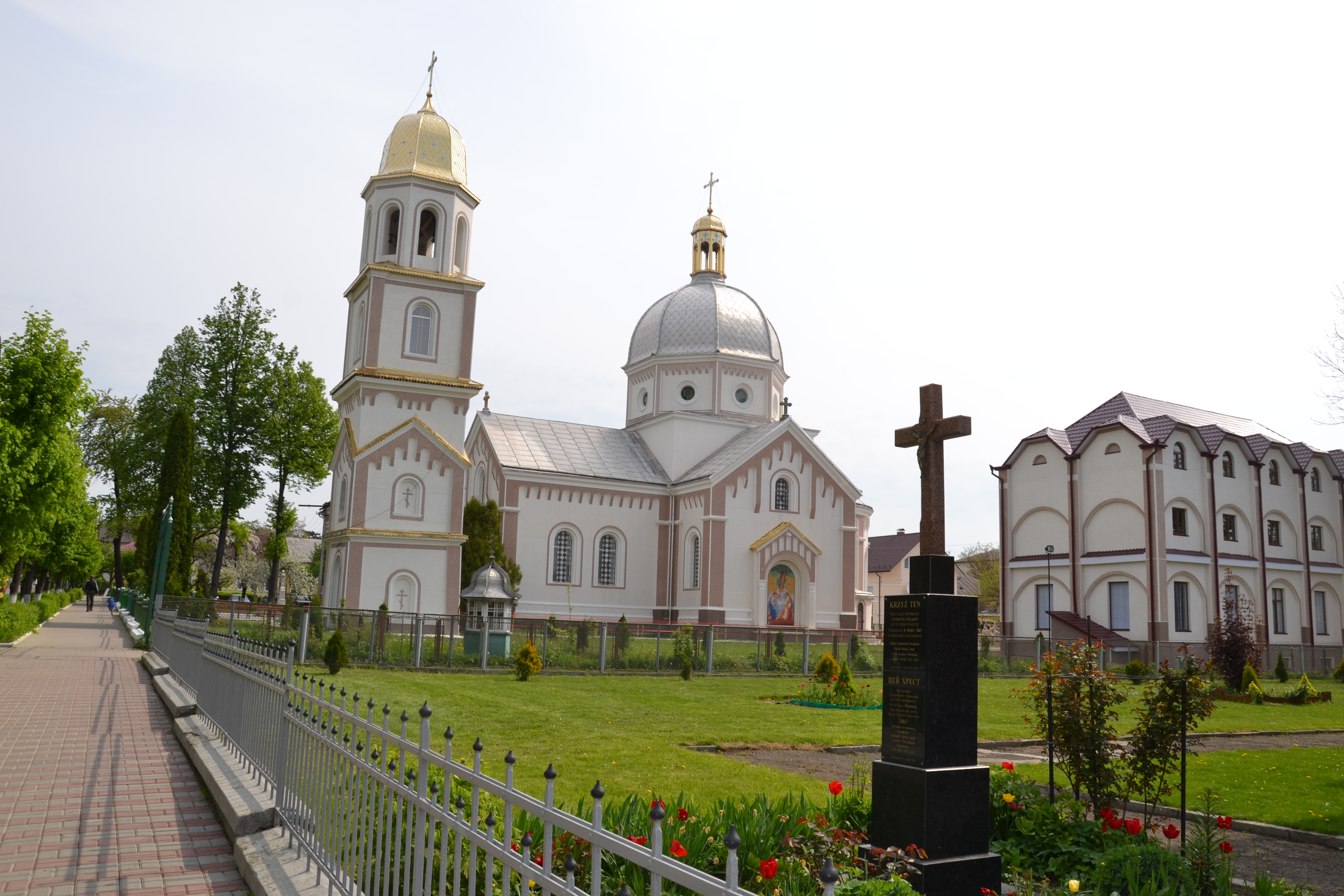
Saint George Orthodox Church

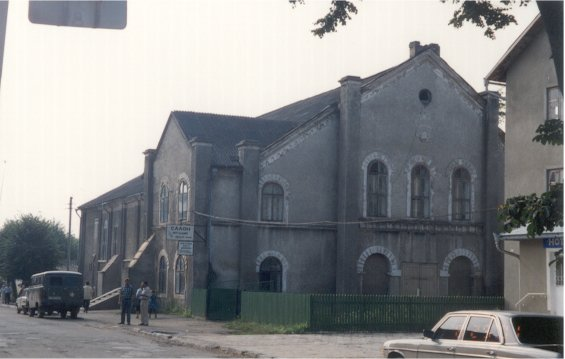
Synagogue

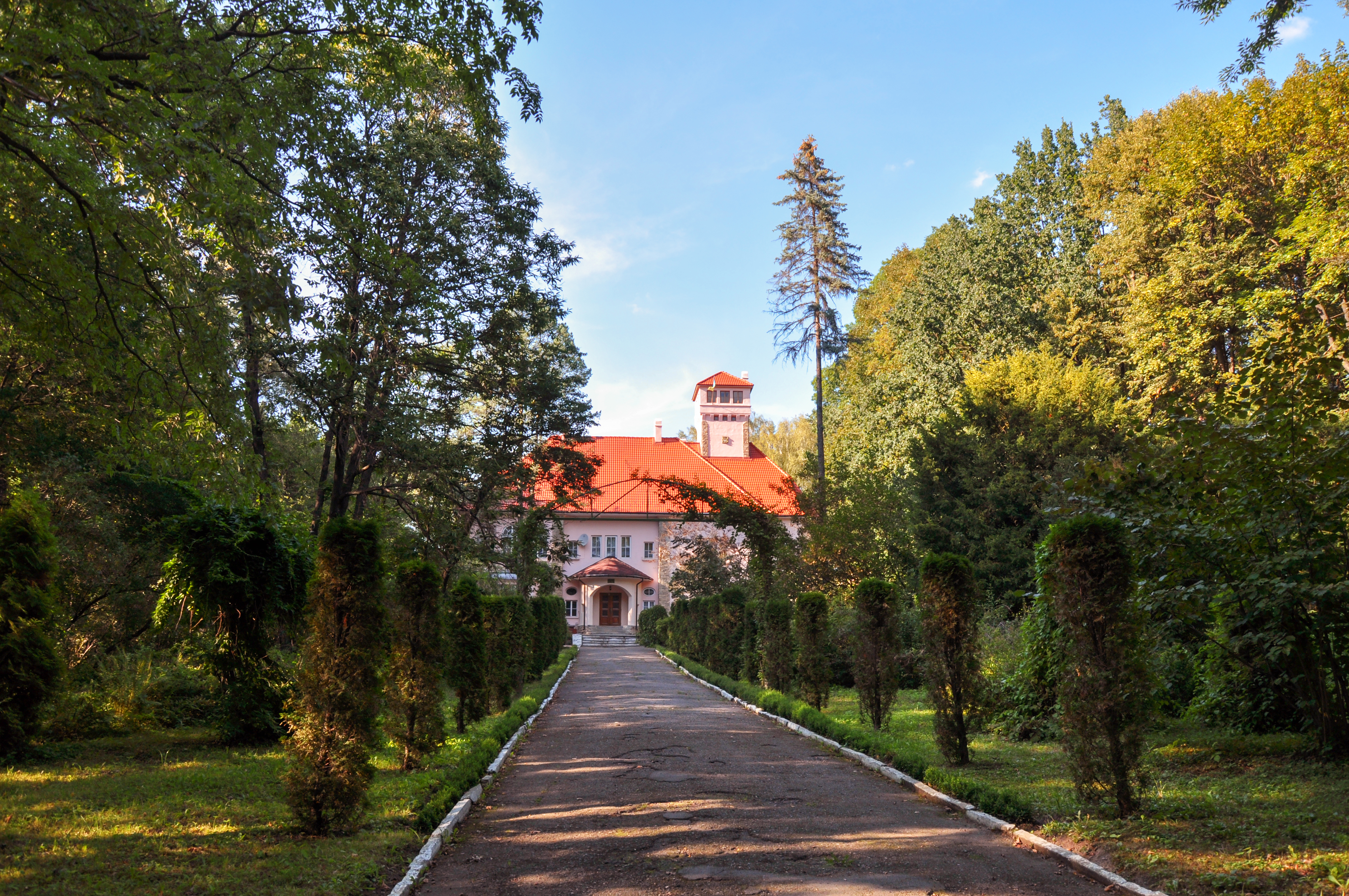
Storozhynets Dendropark

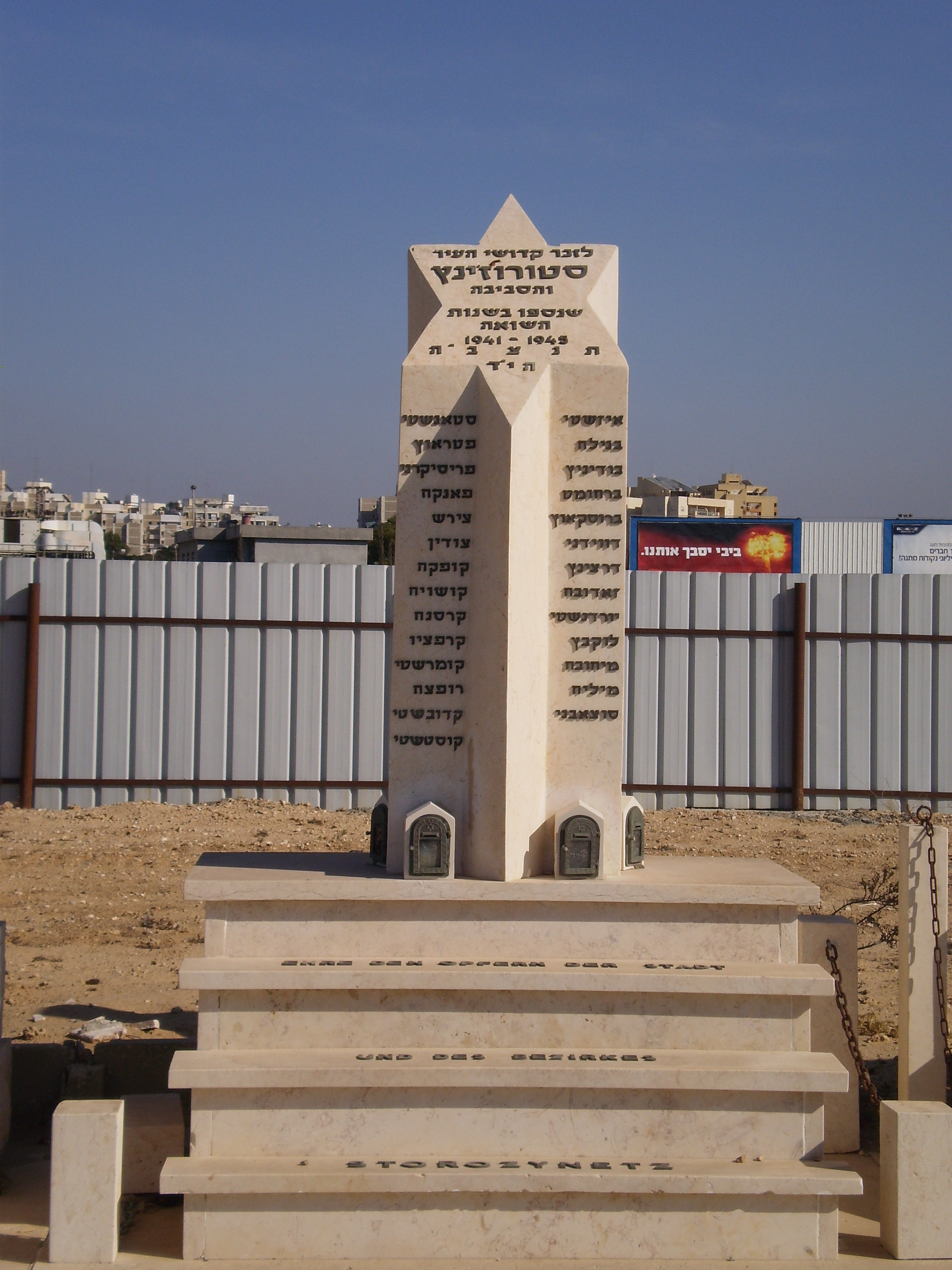
Storozhynets holocaust memorial in Holon, Israel

== See also ==
- Bukovina
- Duchy of Bukovina
