= Bohdana Frolyak =

Ukrainian composer

Bohdana Oleksiivna Frolyak Богдана Олексіївна Фроляк Shevchenko National Prize laureate
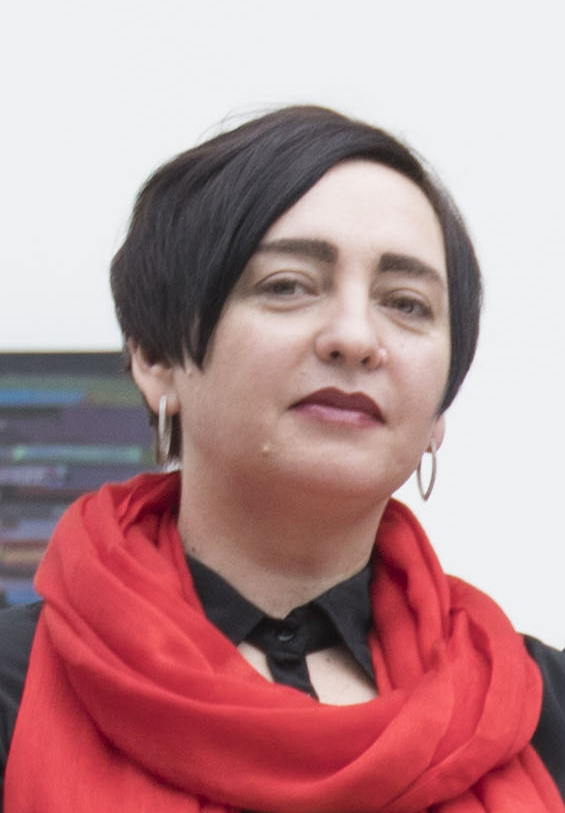
- Frolyak in 2017

Background information
- Born: May 5, 1968 (age 58); Vydyniv, Ukrainian SSR, Soviet Union
- Genre: Modern
- Occupation: Composer

Bohdana Oleksiivna Frolyak (Note: Ukrainian: Богдана Олексіївна Фроляк, romanized: Bohdana Oleksiivna Froliak, typically given as Frolyak) (born 5 May 1968) is a modern Ukrainian composer.

== Biography ==
Frolyak was born in Vydyniv, Ivano-Frankivsk Oblast, Ukrainian SSR, and made her first musical steps in her native village under the guidance of Vasyl Kufliuk, a village teacher who gained educational and musical graduation in Warsaw. In 1986, she graduated from Solomiya Krushelnytska Lviv Musical School after studying piano, music theory and composition. In 1991, she graduated from Lviv Conservatory as a composer. Her teachers in the academy were Volodymyr Flys and Myroslav Skoryk. In 1998, Frolyak completed a non-degree postgraduate course of the same university. In 2009, she attended two courses at the faculty of composition and faculty of contemporary music and jazz of Academy of Music in Kraków (Poland).

Since 1991 she has been a lecturer at faculty of musical composition at Lviv Conservatory. She is also a member of the Ukrainian Composers’ Union.

== Scholarships and awards ==
- Scholarships:
  - 2001 — scholarship of Warsaw Autumn Friends' Foundation and Ernst von Siemens Musikstiftung;
  - 2004 — scholarship Gaude Polonia from Minister of Culture of Poland;
- Awards:
  - 2000 — Levko Revutsky award in the field of composition;
  - 2005 — Borys Lyatoshynsky state award in the field of composition;

== Major works ==
- Orchestral
  - Symphony No. 1 Orbis Terrarum — 1998;
  - Symphony No. 2— 2009;
  - Concerto for piano and orchestra (for young players) — 2000;
  - Concerto for clarinet and orchestra — 2004–2005;
  - "U vozdukhakh plavayut' lisy..."(Ukrainian: У воздухах плвавють ліси...) on versus by Vasyl Stefanyk and Nazar Honchar for clarinet, cello, piano, mixed choir and stringed instruments — 2002;
  - Vestigia for violin, viola and stringed instruments — 2003;
  - Kyrie eleison for mixed choir and strings — 2004;
  - Daemmerung for clarinet and strings — 2005;
  - Agnus Dei for mixed choir and strings — 2006;
  - Jak modlitwa on versus by Adam Zagajewski for soprano and orchestra — 2007;
  - Clarification for cello and strings — 2006;
  - Let There be Light for Orchestra — 2023;
  - Small ensembles and solo
  - "Why should i, like a tim'rous bird, to distant mountains fly?" (according to Psalm No. 10(11) from the Book of Psalms) for flute, alto flute, clarinet, bass clarinet, alto saxophone (english horn in the initial edition), violin, viola and cello — 2001;
  - Stück for piano — 2004;
  - Partita–meditation for two violins — 2007;
  - Lamento for piano trio — 2007;
  - Suite in C for cello and piano — 2008;
  - Inventions for eight cellos — 2009;

== Festivals ==
- Contrasts in Lviv, Ukraine;
- Kyiv-Music-Fest in Kyiv, Ukraine;
- Premieres of the Season in Kyiv;
- Two days and two nights of new music in Odesa, Ukraine;
- Days of Ukrainian music in Warsaw, Poland and Moscow, Russia;
- Days of Ukrainian sacred music in Uzhhorod, Ukraine;
- Days of Music by Kraków Composers in Kraków, Poland;
- Starosądecki Festiwal Muzyki Dawnej in Stary Sącz, Poland;
- Warsaw Autumn in Warsaw, Poland;
- Muzyka w Sandomierzu in Sandomierz, Poland;
- At Cultural Crossroads in Krakow and Stary Sącz, Poland;
- MENHIR 2005 music festival falera in Switzerland;
