= Roman Simovych =

- Роман Сімович
- Born: 28 February 1901; Sniatyn, Kingdom of Galicia and Lodomeria, Austria-Hungary (present-day Ukraine)
- Died: 30 July 1984 (aged 83); Lviv, Ukrainian SSR, Soviet Union
- Occupations: Composer; Teacher; Music theorist

Roman Apollonovych Simovych (Note: Ukrainian: Роман Аполлонович Сімович, romanized: Roman Apollonovych Simovych) (28 February 1901 – 30 July 1984) was a Ukrainian composer, educator, and music theorist.

Born in Sniatyn, now in Ukraine, Simovych graduated from the Prague Conservatory in 1934 - on piano (Vilém Kurz), and again in 1936 undergoing post graduate studies in composition (Vítězslav Novák). From 1936 to 1939 he was a teacher of piano and theoretical subjects at the Lviv National Music Academy in Drohobych and from 1939 to 1942 at the music school in Stanislav (now Ivano-Frankivsk). From 1951, he was a lecturer and from 1963, a full professor at the Lviv Conservatory. He received the title Honoured Artist of the USSR (1954).

He died in 1984 and was buried in Lviv, Ukrainian SSR, Soviet Union.

== Works ==
- Ballet "Sopilka Dovbush" (1948, libretto by A. Herynovycha)
- 7 symphonies:
  - "Hutsul" (1945),
  - "Lemko" (1947),
  - "Spring" (1951),
  - "Heroic" (1954),
  - "Mountain" (1955),
  - Sixth (1965),
  - Seventh (1972);
- Symphonic poems "Sergeant Maxim", "Dovbush", "In memory of Ivan Franko"
- Symphonic overtures, suites;
- Concerto for flute and symphony orchestra (1953);
- String quartet, two trios;
- Works for piano:
- 2 Sonatas, Sonatina In suite,
- Variation,
- Ronda,
- Fantasy;
- Works for violin and cello and piano, Variations for harp, works for mixed choir and orchestra and unaccompanied.
- Piano concerto (19??)
