= Odesa National Academy of Music =

Music school in Odesa, Ukraine

A.V. Nezhdanova Odesa National Academy of Music
- Одеська національна музична академія імені А. В. Нежданової
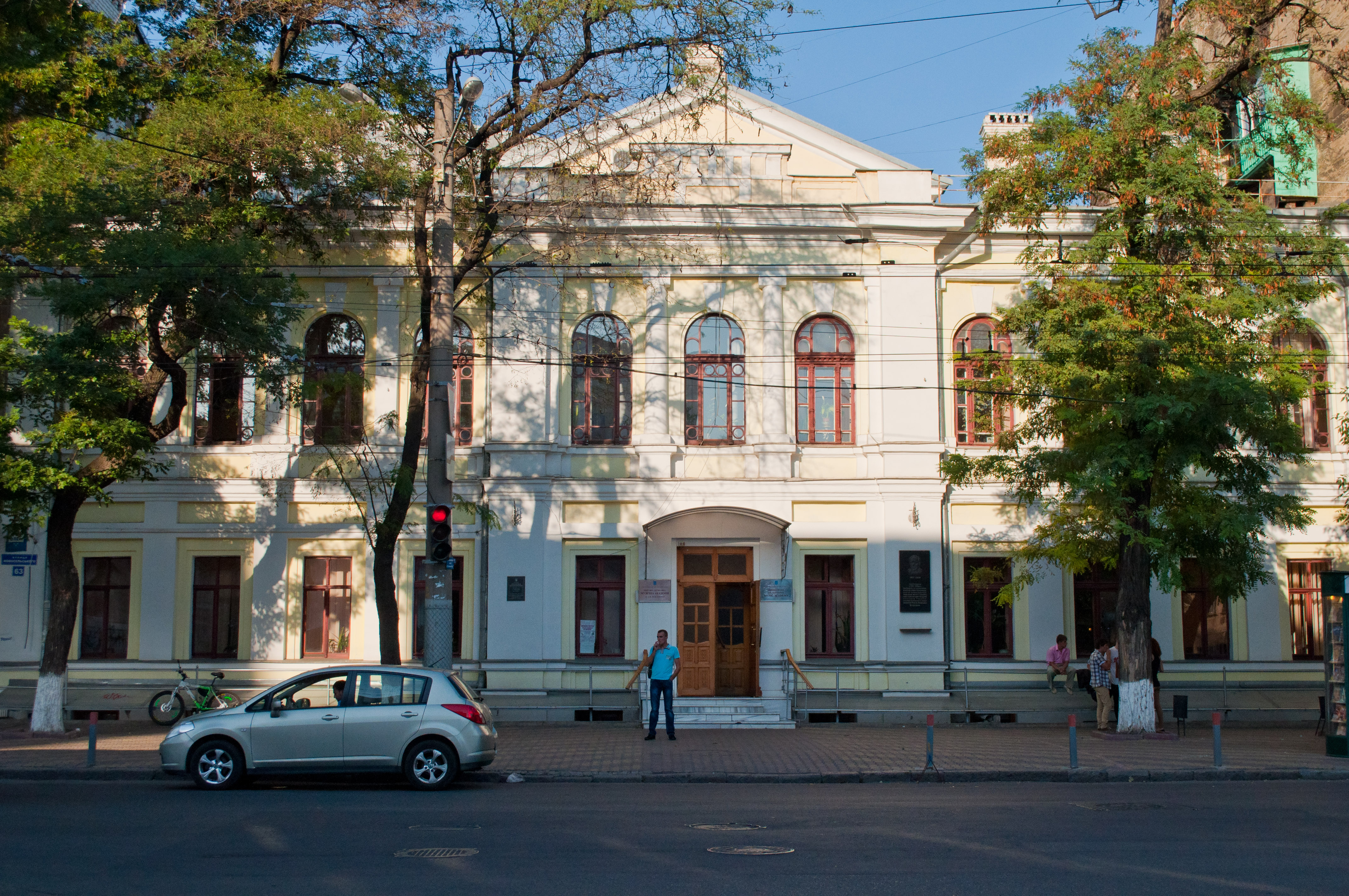
- Odesa Conservatory
- Former name: Odesa Conservatory
- Type: Public, Music academy
- Established: 1913
- Accreditation: Ministry of Education and Science of Ukraine
- Location: Odesa, Ukraine
- Campus: Urban
- Website: odma.edu.ua/en/

Immovable Monument of Local Significance of Ukraine
- Official name: Будинок учбовий (арх. Кюнер Ф.Е.) Одеської консерваторії, першої на півдні України, відкритої у вересні 1913 р., в якій навчались і викладали діячі культури: Столярський П.С., Малишевський В.М., Данькевич К.Ф., Благовидова О.М., Орофєєв С., Золотарьов В., Молчанов П., Ваулін В., Гілельс Е., Пирогов К., Коган А. та Герой Радянського Союзу Вершигора П. та інші (Academy building (arch. F. E. Kuhner) of the Odesa Conservatory, the first in Southern Ukraine, opened in September, 1913, where the following culture activists studied and worked: P. S. Stoliarskyi, V. M. Malyshevskyi, K. F. Dankevych, O. M. Blahovydova, S. Orofieiev, V. Zolotariov, P. Molchanov, V. Vaulin, E. Hilels, K. Pyrohov, A. Kohan, and the Hero of Soviet Union P. Vershyhora and others)
- Type: Architecture, Urban Planning, History
- Reference no.: 541-Од

The Odesa National Academy of Music (also known as the Odesa Conservatory or formally the A.V. Nezhdanova Odesa National Academy of Music) is a national higher education music academy in Odesa, Odesa Oblast, Ukraine.

== History ==
The Odesa Conservatory was established in 1913 on the foundation of the music college (opened in 1897) of the Odesa branch of the Imperial Russian Music Society. The founder of the conservatory was a prominent Polish composer, conductor and teacher Witold Maliszewski (1873-1939), a student of Nikolai Rimsky-Korsakov and Alexander Glazunov, and a teacher of Mykola Vilinsky and Witold Lutosławski.

In 1923, it was divided into a music institute and a technical school, which in 1928 were merged into the Music and Drama Institute.

In 1934 the Odesa Conservatory was re-established in the previous form. In 1950, it was named after the outstanding opera singer Antonina Nezhdanova. That decision by Stalin's government not only disregarded Maliszewski’s foundational role but also provoked a long-standing controversy, since Nezhdanova had no connection to the institution.

On May 8, 2012, by the decree of the President of Ukraine Viktor Yanukovych, the conservatory was renamed to "A.V. Nezhdanova Odesa National Academy of Music" and was granted a national status.

== See also ==
List of universities in Ukraine
