= Antonina Nezhdanova =

Russian opera singer (1873–1950)

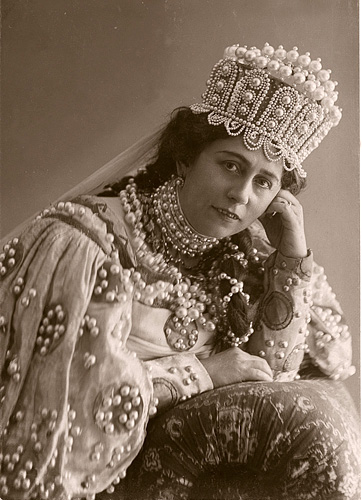
Nezhdanova as the titular heroine in Ruslan and Lyudmila, 1911

Antonina Vasilyevna Nezhdanova (Russian: Антонина Васильевна Нежданова, 16 June [O.S. 4 June] 1873 – 26 June 1950) was a Russian and Soviet lyric coloratura soprano.

== Life ==
Nezhdanova was born in Krivaya Balka, near Odessa, Kherson Governorate, Russian Empire (present-day Odesa, Ukraine). In 1899, she entered the Moscow Conservatory. Upon her graduation three years later she joined the Bolshoi Theatre, rapidly becoming its leading soprano. She often sang, too, at the Mariinsky Theatre in Saint Petersburg and also in Kiev and Odessa. Paris heard Nezhdanova in 1912 (her only performance abroad), when she appeared opposite the tenor Enrico Caruso and the baritone Titta Ruffo.

Nezhdanova was the dedicatee of Sergei Rachmaninoff's Vocalise, and she was the first performer of the arrangement for soprano and orchestra, with Serge Koussevitzky conducting. She created a number of operatic roles. After the Russian Revolution she stayed on at the Bolshoi, unlike some of her fellow opera singers, who left their native country for the West. In 1936, she began to teach singing in Moscow and was appointed a professor at the Moscow Conservatory in 1943.

She was married to the conductor Nikolai Golovanov and died in Moscow in 1950.

== Legacy ==
Nezhdanova made a number of recordings that display the beauty and flexibility of her voice and the excellence of her technique. She is considered by opera historians and critics to have been one of the finest sopranos of the 20th century. However, most of Nezhdanova's critical acclaim originates from Soviet-era sources, whose reliability is not always beyond question. Her sole appearance on the European opera stage—in Paris, 1912—was not particularly consequential in terms of either critical breakthrough or future professional engagement abroad. In his Soviet diary entry of February 6, 1927, Sergei Prokofiev observed: "Nezhdanova is already a middle-aged lady, very tall and very lovable. People say she is already losing her voice".

In 1950, Stalin's government ordered the renaming of the Odessa Conservatory in honor of Nezhdanova, despite her having no connection to the institution.
