= Botvinov =

Botvinov (masculine, Russian: Ботвинов, Ukrainian: Ботвінова) or Botvinova (feminine, Russian: Ботвинова, Ukrainian: Ботвінова) is a Russian and Ukrainian surname. Notable people with the surname include:

- Alexey Botvinov (born 1964), Ukrainian pianist
- Mikhail Botvinov (born 1967), Russian–born Austrian cross-country skier
