= Valentyn Silvestrov =

Ukrainian pianist and composer

Valentin Silvestrov MBE
- Валентин Сильвестров
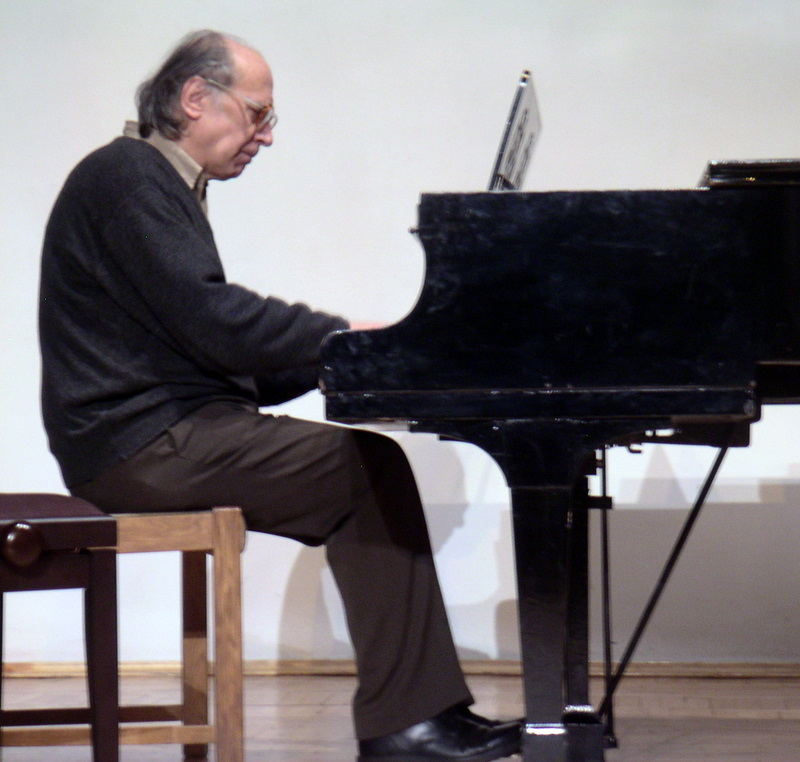
- Silvestrov in 2009
- Born: 30 September 1937; Kyiv, Ukrainian SSR, Soviet Union
- Education: Kyiv Conservatory
- Occupations: Composer; pianist
- Awards: Shevchenko National Prize

Valentin Vasylyovych Silvestrov (Note: also Valentyn Vasilyevich Sylvestrov and Valentyn Vasil'yovych Sil'vestrov) (Ukrainian: Валентин Васильович Сильвестров; born 30 September 1937) is a Ukrainian composer and pianist who plays and writes contemporary classical music. He is a laureate of the Shevchenko National Prize.

== Biography ==
Valentin Vasylyovych Silvestrov was born on 30 September 1937 in Kyiv, Ukrainian SSR, then part of the Soviet Union.

Silvestrov began private music lessons at 15. After first teaching himself, he studied piano at the Kyiv Evening Music School from 1955 to 1958 whilst training to become a civil engineer. He attended the Kyiv Conservatory from 1958 to 1964, where he studied musical composition with Borys Lyatoshynsky and harmony and counterpoint with Levko Revutsky. He then taught at a music studio in Kyiv.

Silvestrov was a freelance composer in Kyiv from 1970 to 2022. He fled to Berlin upon the 2022 Russian invasion of Ukraine.

== Music ==
Silvestrov is best known for his postmodern music, some of which is also considered neoclassical. Using traditional tonal and modal techniques, he creates delicate tapestries of dramatic and emotional textures, qualities he feels are often lost in contemporary music: "I do not write new music. My music is a response to and an echo of what already exists."

In 1974, pressured to conform to socialist realism and trends of modernism, and to apologise for his composers' meeting walkout protesting the Warsaw Pact invasion of Czechoslovakia, Silvestrov withdrew from the spotlight and began to reject his earlier modernist style, composing the Silent Songs (Тихі Пісні, 1977) cycle for private performance. After the Soviet Union's fall, he composed spiritual and religious works influenced by Russian and Ukrainian Orthodox liturgical music. He traced his rejection of avant-garde techniques to his Kyiv Conservatory years, when Lyatoshynsky asked, "Do you like this?", a question he said was "ingrained in my soul".

His 2004-05 70-minute violin and piano cycle, Melodies of the Moments (Мелодії Миттєвостей), seven works with 22 movements, is intimate and elusive. He describes it as "melodies ... on the boundary between their appearance and disappearance". Elements of Ukrainian nationalism occur in works like Diptych, which sets the words of Taras Shevchenko's prominent patriotic poem "Testament" ("Заповіт", 1845) to music for chorus. He dedicated it in 2014 to Serhiy Nigoyan, the Armenian-Ukrainian Euromaidan activist killed in the 2014 Hrushevsky Street protests, perhaps the first of the Maidan casualties that led to the Revolution of Dignity.

== Works ==
Silvestrov's principal and published works include 9 symphonies, poems for piano and orchestra, miscellaneous pieces for chamber orchestra, three string quartets, a piano quintet, three piano sonatas, chamber music, and vocal music (cantatas, songs, etc.).

Work	Year	Rev.	Genre
Symphony No. 1	1963	1974	Orchestra
Classical Overture	1964		Orchestra
Monodia for piano and orchestra	1965		Orchestra
Spectres	1965		Chamber Orchestra/Ensemble
Symphony No. 2 for flute, timpani, piano, and string orchestra	1965		Chamber Orchestra/Ensemble
Symphony No. 3, "Eschatophony"	1966		Orchestra
Hymn	1968		Orchestra
Poem (in memoriam B. N. Liatoshynsky)	1968		Orchestra
Meditation for chamber orchestra	1972		Orchestra
Postludium for piano and orchestra	1974		Orchestra
Symphony No. 4 for brass instruments and strings	1976		Orchestra
Serenade for Chamber Orchestra	1978		Orchestra
Symphony No. 5	1980-82		Orchestra
Intermezzo	1983		Chamber Orchestra/Ensemble
Exegi monumentum for baritone (or soprano) and orchestra	1985-87		Vocal
Widmung (Dedication), symphony for violin and orchestra	1990-91		Orchestra
Metamuzïka for piano and orchestra	1992		Orchestra
Symphony No. 6	1994-95		Orchestra
Visnyk 96 (The Messenger) for synthesizer, piano and string orchestra	1997		Orchestra
Hymn 2001	2001		Chamber Orchestra/Ensemble
Meta Waltz, symphonic poem for orchestra	2002		Orchestra
Symphony No. 7	2003		Orchestra
Symphony No. 8	2012-13		Orchestra
Symphony No. 9	2017-19		Orchestra
Prayer for Ukraine (arr. by Eduard Resatsch)	2022		Chamber Orchestra/Ensemble
Prayer for Ukraine (arr. by Andreas Gies)	2022		Orchestra
Piano Sonata No. 1	1960	1972	Piano Solo
Sonatina	1960		Piano Solo
Piano Quintet	1961		Chamber Music
Five Pieces for Piano	1961		Piano Solo
Quartetto Piccolo for String Quartet	1961		Chamber Music
Triada, 13 pieces for piano	1961		Piano Solo
Trio for Flute, Trumpet, and Celeste	1962		Chamber Music
Mystery for Alto Flute and Six Percussion Groups	1964		Chamber Music
Projections for Harpsichord, Vib, and Chimes	1965		Chamber Music
Elegy for piano	1967		Piano Solo
Drama for violin, cello, and piano	1969-71		Chamber Music
Children's Music, Books 1 & 2	1973		Piano Solo
Music in Olden Style	1973		Piano Solo
String Quartet No. 1	1974		Chamber Music
Piano Sonata No. 2	1975		Piano Solo
Kitsch-Music	1977		Piano Solo
Piano Sonata No. 3	1979		Piano Solo
Postludium for violin	1981		Violin Solo
Postludium for cello and piano	1982		Chamber Music
Sonata for cello	1983		Chamber Music
String Quartet No. 2	1988		Chamber Music
Post Scriptum sonata for violin and piano	1990		Chamber Music
Misterioso for clarinet and piano	1996		Chamber Music
5 Cycles for violin and piano	2019-21		Chamber Music
A Winter Night’s Music for violin, piano, and synthesizer ("wind")	2004-10	2018	Chamber Music
Epitaphium (L.B.) for violin or cello and piano	1999		Chamber Music
Five Pieces from Melodies of the Moments for violin and piano	2004		Chamber Music
Hommage à J.S.B. for violin and piano	2009		Chamber Music
Melodies of the Moments — Cycle I for violin and piano	2004		Chamber Music
Melodies of the Moments — Cycle II for violin and piano	2004		Chamber Music
Melodies of the Moments — Cycle III for violin and piano	2004		Chamber Music
Melodies of the Moments — Cycle IV for violin and piano	2004		Chamber Music
Melodies of the Moments — Cycle V for violin and piano	2004-05		Chamber Music
Songs Without Words for violin and piano	2004		Chamber Music
Fugitive Visions of Mozart for violin, cello, and piano (originally titled Moments of Mozart)	2006	2007	Chamber Music
Two Pieces for violin and piano	2010		Chamber Music
Pastorals for violin and piano	2020		Chamber Music
Pastorals for violin, cello, and piano	2023		Chamber Music
Icon	2004		Chamber Music
Sonata for Cello and Piano	1983	2000	Chamber Music
String Quartet No. 3	2011		Chamber Music
Diptychon	1995		Choral
Three Sacred Songs	2013		Choral
Elegy	1996		Choral
Prayer for Ukraine	2014		Choral
Liturgical Chants	2005		Choral
Ode to Joy	2011		Choral
Psalm: 8 Variations on the Ukrainian folksong "Oh, from the rocky mountain"	2019		Choral
Requiem for Larissa	1997-99		Choral
Over All the Mountain Tops is Peace	2009		Choral
Four Sacred Chants	2022		Choral
Four Psalms	2024		Choral
Two Christmas Lullabies	2006		Choral
Maidan 2014: a cycle of cycles in the wake of the Euromaidan	2014-16		Choral
Moments of Poetry and Music	2003		Choral
Autumn Serenade for soprano and chamber orchestra	1980	2000	Vocal
Cantata for soprano and chamber orchestra	1973		Vocal
Cantata No. 12 for soprano or baritone and chamber orchestra	2020		Vocal
Cantata No. 4 for soprano, piano, and string orchestra	2014		Vocal
Ode to the Nightingale cantata for soprano, piano, and chamber orch	1983	2000	Vocal
Silent Songs	1974-77		Vocal
Three Postludes for soprano, violin, cello, and piano	1981	1982	Vocal

== Discography ==
Silvestrov has released/appeared on 16 albums with ECM, which began a dedicated series to the composer in 2002. This series includes a 1986 archival recording of the song cycle Silent Songs. Albums in ECM's Silvestrov series include:

- leggiero, pesante (2002) — ECM 1776
- Metamusik/Postludium (2003) — ECM 1790
- Requiem for Larissa (2004) — ECM 1778
- Silent Songs (2004) — ECM 1898/99
- Symphony No. 6 (2007) — ECM 1935
- Bagatellen und Serenaden (2007) — ECM 1988
- Sacred Works (2009) — ECM 2117
- Sacred Songs (2012) — ECM 2279
- Hieroglyphen der Nacht (2017) — ECM 2389
- Maidan (2022) — ECM 2359

Across all labels, the website Presto Music lists over 140 albums for Silvestrov, including Valentin Silvestrov: Forgotten Word I Wished to Say, released on Sony Classical by pianist Alexei Lubimov and soprano Viktoriia Vitrenko. Lubimov also released Silvestrov: ...flowering Over Lethe... on the label Fuga Libera in 2025.

In 2023, pianist Hélène Grimaud and baritone Konstantin Krimmel recorded his Silent Songs for Deutsche Grammophon. Grimaud also released a tribute album to Silvestrov on the same label in 2022. Violinist Daniel Hope and pianist Alexey Botvinov released a similar album, also for DG, that same year (which marked the composer's 85th birthday).

== Sources ==
- Baley, Virko (2001). "Sil′vestrov, Valentyn Vasil′yovych". Grove Music Online (8th ed.). Oxford University Press. ISBN 978-1-56159-263-0. (subscription, Wikilibrary access, or UK public library membership required)
- Schmelz, Peter J. (2009). Such Freedom, If Only Musical: Unofficial Soviet Music During the Thaw. New York: Oxford University Press. ISBN 978-01953-4-193-5.
- Wilson, Samuel (2015). "Valentin Silvestrov and the symphonic movement in ruins". In Guldbrandsen, Erling E.; Johnson, Julian (eds.). Transformations of Musical Modernism. Cambridge: Cambridge University Press. ISBN 978-11071-2-721-0.

=== Further reading ===
- Sonevytsky, Savytsky; Roman, Marko Robert (2011). "Sylvestrov, Valentyn". Internet Encyclopaedia of Ukraine. Canadian Institute of Ukrainian Studies.
