= My Pilot, Whale =

Documentary film directed by Alexander and Nicole Gratovsky,

My pilot, whale
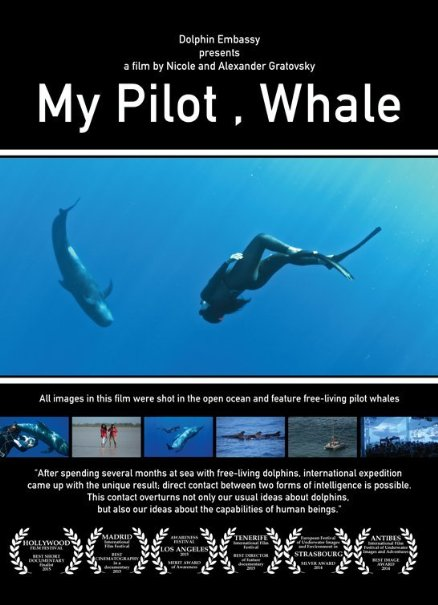
- An official film poster
- Directed by: Alexander and Nicole Gratovsky
- Cinematography: Underwater – Rafa Herrero Massieu; On land – Victoria Fortunina
- Music by: Elephant's Hands
- Production company: Dolphin Embassy
- Release date: 2014
- Running time: 28 minutes
- Countries: Russia; Spain
- Languages: Russian; French; English

My Pilot, Whale is a 2014 short documentary film directed by Alexander and Nicole Gratovsky, demonstrating direct communication between a human and free pilot whales in the open ocean.

The entire underwater part was shot without diving equipment; both the operator and the person appearing in the frame are freediving.

The film’s premiere took place in Marseille as part of the World Festival of Underwater Images in November 2014 and then, during the year, the film won several prizes, and was repeatedly nominated and selected in the official programs of European and American film festivals. In Russia the film was first shown on 30 March 2015 in the Angleterre cinema club in St. Petersburg. Before the official premiere, several fragments of the film were shown on the inner arches of the Peter and Paul Cathedral on Maroseyka in Moscow during the audio-visual event "Night in the Cathedral" organised by the Dolphin Embassy. The film first aired on Russian television on 20 January 2016 during the Observer program on the Culture channel. After participating in international film festivals, the full version of the film was posted on the Internet for free viewing.

== Title ==
The film’s title plays on the most commonly used international name for Globicephalas, pilot whales, and indicates, in accordance with the opinion of the film’s authors, the leading, meaning forming and teaching role played by dolphins in interactions with humans. This is additionally emphasized by the film’s narration.

== Plot ==
From the very first frames, the viewer is plunged into the atmosphere of an expedition, seeing everything that occurs through the eyes of one of the participants in the events. Frames shot on the shore are followed by footage from the side of a ship that has set off into the open ocean, after which the camera looks at the world from under water, watching how, from afar, come dolphins, appearing as if out of nowhere. Then we see a person in the water, who swims calmly and gracefully towards the dolphins. Contact takes place tactfully and tenderly: there is no touching, only an exchange of glances, mutual interest and a sensitive focus of each on the other. Much of the film consists of precisely such rare shots of interaction between a human and free pilot whales in their natural environment, the open ocean. The camera remains very close to the dolphins almost the entire time, as a result of which a sensation of presence, unhurriedness, gracefulness, relaxed concentration and smoothness is conveyed to the viewer. This is also emphasized through the long plans and style of editing employed. The film’s visual beauty is complemented by original music, a duet by a cello and bass guitar, that follows the movements of the human and dolphins, emotionally emphasizing what is occurring on the screen. The authors themselves speak of their film as follows:

The film is an immersion into the world of creatures that have inhabited our planet fifty times longer than humanity. The film is an experience of a direct dialogue with them and with the Universe. The film is an opportunity for a different way of seeing life, consciousness and ourselves.

— Directors, Alexander and Nicole Gratovsky

The film’s meaningful content is expressed through the narration, which conveys to the viewer the thoughts of a member of the expedition who interacts with dolphins in the ocean. The viewer is asked a lot of questions: “Why do whales and dolphins not seek contact with us? What happens to the ocean as a result of them living in it? As a result of the fact that they are the only ones on the planet that never sleep? What do they do to the world through their lives, woven from attention and love? Why do they not respond in kind when we cause them pain? Where does the contact zone lie? What would our civilization be like today if it were guided by different principles, such as that feelings are more important and more perfect than the mind? Does each of us have a direct and immediate opportunity to communicate with the Universe?”

At the end of the film, prior to the credits, an inscription appears on the screen that is not voiced by the narrator: “Every year in the Faroe Islands, on the day of the traditional annual hunt, nearly a thousand pilot whales are killed.” In this way, the film is simultaneously a manifesto on the protection of cetaceans, urging people to think again and stop the destruction of some of the most aware creatures on the planet.

== Awards ==
2016

- Platinum Remi in the “Oceanography” category at the 49th International Houston Film Festival, USA, March 2016

2015

- Nominee in the categories of “Best Director of a Documentary”, “Best Cinematography” and “Best Editing” at the Milan International Filmmaker Festival of World Cinema, Italy, November 2015
- Winner in the nomination “Merit Award of Awareness” at the Awareness Film Festival, Los Angeles, California, September 2015
- Winner in the nomination “Best Cinematography in a Documentary”, as well as nominee in the categories of “Best Producer of a Documentary”, “Best Scientific/Educational Documentary” and “Best Director of a Short Documentary” at the Madrid international Film Festival, Spain, July 2015
- Winner in the nomination “Best Director of a Feature Documentary”, as well as nominee in the categories of “Best Feature Documentary”, “Best Cinematography in a Documentary”, as well as nominee for the special “Jury Award” at the International Film Festival in Tenerife, Spain, July 2015

2014

- “Best Image Award” at the International Festival of Underwater and Adventure Films in Antibes, France, December 2014
- Official selection of the World Festival of Underwater Images in Marseille, France, November 2014

== Links ==
- Full version of the film on YouTube
- My Pilot, Whale at IMDb
- The film's official page on the website of the production company “The Dolphin Embassy”
