= Alexander and Nicole Gratovsky =

Anthropologists

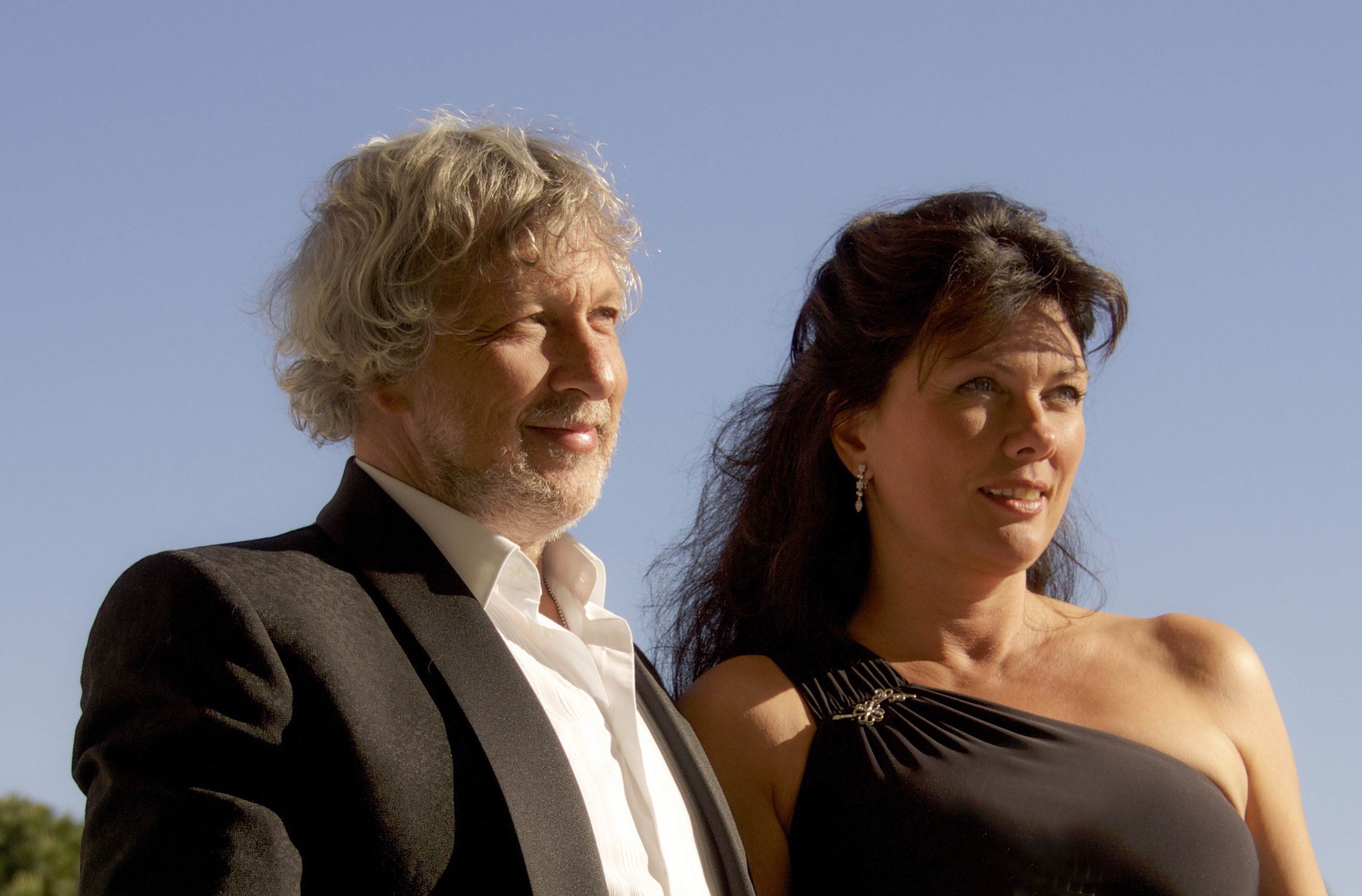
- Born: Alexander 1963 (age 62–63), Nicole 1972 (age 53–54)
- Occupations: anthropologists, writers, travellers, filmmakers, public figures
- Years active: 1990 — present
- Website: https://dolphinembassy.org

Alexander and Nicole Gratovsky are Russian and European (Belgium, Spain) anthropologists of Russian descent, spouses, co-authors of books, films, expositions, public presentations, and cultural events in the field of mind and consciousness research.

== First joint projects ==
Alexander and Nicole (maiden name Kors) met in 1990 in Brussels and were baptised into the Orthodox faith and married at the Novodevichy Convent in Moscow in the same year. At baptism, Nicole received the name Tatiana. The couple were married by father Mikhail Ryazantsev.

In 1998, the Gratovskys created the Ultimate Experience Club, engaged in the study of human possibilities, existential consulting, transformative practices and logotherapy in Europe (Belgium) and Russia. Collaborators included leading psychologists, in particular, Jean Becchio and Alexander Asmolov. The Club developed and published a number of humanitarian technologies in the field of conscious construction of the future in the form of collective monographs. Based on the results of the club's projects, the Gratovskys wrote a series of documentary adventure novels under the pseudonym Alex Forain.

In the early 2000s, the Gratovskys began to engage in independent "non-invasive" studies of free-living dolphins and whales. Having spent more than 5,000 hours with free dolphins and whales, based on their own experience of interaction with them, as well as numerous scientific data indicating the high level of intelligence of cetaceans, their possession of self-awareness, a highly organised society and culture, the Gratovskys consider cetaceans to be carriers of the most developed (although organised differently to that of humans) consciousness on the planet, with "capabilities and a way of life that contain highly important lessons for humans."

== Dolphin Embassy ==
In 2008, the Gratovskys created the Dolphin Embassy: "an interdisciplinary centre considering the modern era, not from the anthropocentric position of the "conqueror of nature" and the "crown of creation," but from the perspective of the planet as a unified, living and intelligent organism and, as a special case, from the position of dolphins and whales." The embassy is simultaneously a research, consulting, production and cultural centre, with its permanent headquarters on Tenerife (Canary Islands). This location was chosen due it being both minimally politically engaged and one of the world's "capitals" of cetaceans.

The embassy appoints "chargés d'affaires." According to the project's creators, these are individuals whose main concern and interest are the planet and humanity as a whole. The embassy's official website and a series of interviews by the Gratovskys indicate that they include approximately one hundred prominent scientists and cultural figures from different countries, among the first of whom were Umberto Eco, Ervin Laszlo, Giacomo Rizzolatti, Slava Polunin and others. The embassy organises independent research expeditions (including the round-the-world "Archaeology of Possibilities" project,) publishing their results in films and books, as well as presenting them during special public events.

One area of research is the possibility of interaction between humans and wildlife, in particular, experiments on the creation of a direct "dialogue" between free dolphins/whales and outstanding modern jazz improvisation musicians (including Arkady Shilkloper, Davide Swarup, David Rothenberg), carried out on the embassy's expedition vessels using underwater acoustic equipment. The video of the musician and public figure Mikhail Kazinik relating the story of one of these experiments in the Federation Council of the Russian Federation in June 2017 evoked significant public interest and gained more than 693,000 views on YouTube (as at 20 May 2020).

== Public activity ==
The Gratovskys engage in public speaking, as well as organisation of educational and cultural events. Central events include the annual Dolphinity World Festival on Tenerife, as well as Dolphin Day at the St. Petersburg International Cultural Forum, focused on the nature of consciousness, the unity of the world and the possibility of direct interaction between mankind and the universe. In 2017, the multimedia exhibition "Just Like You. Human and Dolphin" was visited by 8,000 people over two days.

On 18 November 2017, the Dolphin Language and Culture scientific and practical conference was organised by the Gratovskys in St. Petersburg with the participation of leading cetacean researchers, such as Jim Darling, Hal Whitehead and Toni Frohoff, among others. This resulted in the adoption of the "International Declaration on the Protection of the Rights and Freedom of Dolphins and Whales," which recognises cetaceans as "(non-human) individuals with self-awareness, endowed with intelligence and feelings," in 10 points establishing a new type of relationship between humans and cetaceans: without violence, exploitation and slavery. The Declaration has been signed by prominent scientists, public figures and cultural figures from different countries.

From 10 to 14 October 2019, the NOW Worldview Assembly, organised by the Gratovskys, took place in Delphi, Greece. The Assembly brought together more than 100 thinkers, authors of breakthrough scientific discoveries, ideas and practices from around the world. The Assembly's initiators formulated the event's purpose as follows:

The Assembly is a congress of scientists, cultural figures and social practitioners ready to present to their colleagues their discoveries capable of changing the familiar picture of the universe and mankind. The Assembly intends to find an answer to the possibility of exiting the civilisational impasse.

— Alexander and Nicole Gratovsky

Participants included Ashok Khosla, co-chair of the United Nations Environment Programme International Resource Panel; Barry Kerzin, personal physician to the Dalai Lama; Janusz Wiśniewski, writer, author of the novel Loneliness on the Net; Gerald Pollack, author of the theory of the fourth phase of water; George Ovashvili, film director, screenwriter and producer; Kalevi Kull, head of the International Society for Biosemiotic Studies; heads of the foremost international associations of thinkers, the Club of Rome and the Club of Budapest; among others. The Assembly was held behind closed doors, deliberately excluding the presence of journalists and members of the general public. The Assembly's report, published as a separate book, concludes that urgent changes to humanity's current way of life and hierarchy of values are necessary and inevitable, and new definitions of fundamental existential concepts, such as intelligence, consciousness and life, among others, are proposed in the form of modern Delphic Maxims, with the first being: "Consciousness is the ability to choose the future."

== Books ==
- Out of the Box (English and French title) under the pseudonym Alex Forain. Russian title: Танго с манекеном (lit. trans. Tango with a Mannequin).
- The Promise of Atlantis. Russian title: Генератор возможностей (lit. trans. Generator of Possibilities) (second edition).
- The Dolphin Principle. Russian title: Принцип дельфина (third edition, supplemented).
- 12 vessels of Ji. 12 сосудов ЖИ (dual-language edition).
- Book of Wonders. Russian title: План А (lit. trans. Plan A).
- Another humanity. Dolphins. Другое человечество. Дельфины (dual-language edition).
- Nature of Wonders. Russian title: О природе чудес.

All books are illustrated with original photographs.

== Films ==
Predator of Tenderness film trilogy (Russian title: Хищник Нежность): three films by the Gratovskys (as screenwriters, directors and producers) created on the boundary between the genres of art and documentary. The first film in the trilogy, My Pilot, Whale (Russian title: Мой Пилот, Кит), proposes a view from a human perspective of a dolphin as an "older brother" and the possibility of contact between them. The second, Intraterrestrial (Russian title: Интратеррестр), is a dialogue between a human and a dolphin, two cultures and two worldviews. The third, Revelation of Jonah (Russian title: Откровение Ионы), which looks at man from the perspective of a whale, symbolising the universe as a whole, is a new interpretation of the biblical parable, with the focus transferred from the person of the prophet to modern humanity. The films received numerous prizes from international film festivals. The authors opened the Russian version of Revelation of Jonah for public access immediately after completing work on it on 23 April 2020, at the height of the COVID-19 pandemic in Russia. As at 20 May 2020, more than 89 thousand people had watched the film.

== Family ==
The Gratovskys have a son, Anton, a grandson, Maxim, and a granddaughter, Julia Anna Maria.

== Hobbies ==
Alexander and Nicole are qualified to sail yachts and dance Argentine tango, being students of Pablo Verón.

== Links ==
- Alexander Gratovsky at IMDb
- Nicole Gratovsky at IMDb
- Dolphin Embassy official website
- NOW Worldview Assembly official website
