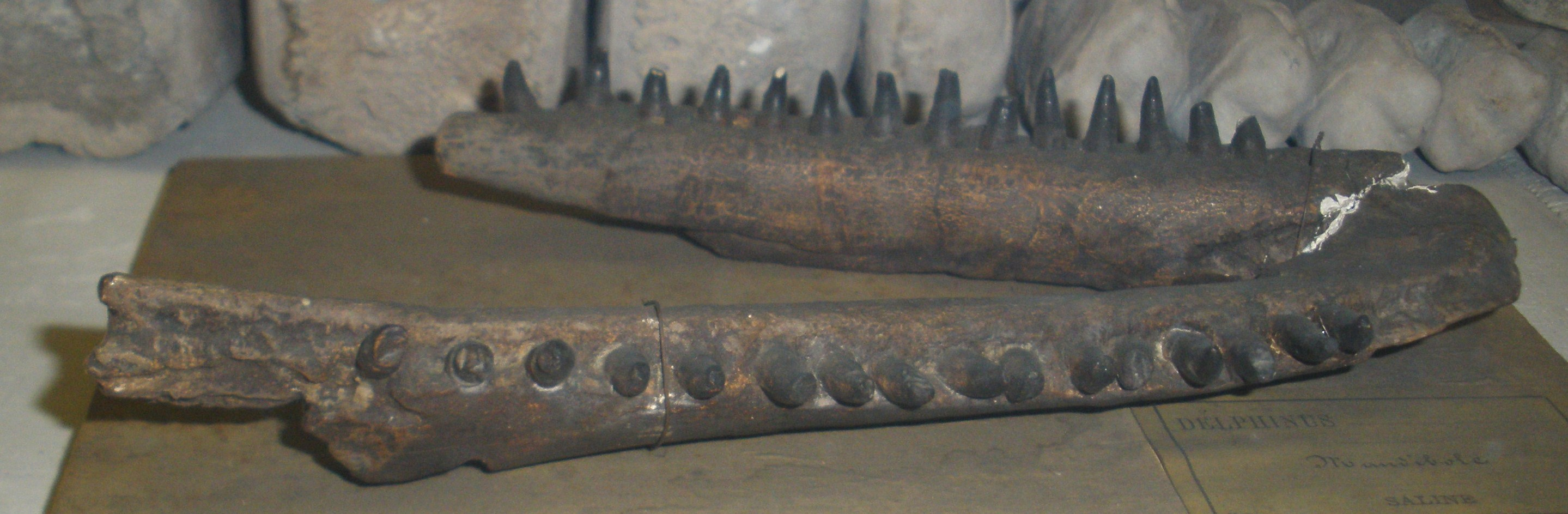
- Lower mandible

Scientific classification
- Domain: Eukaryota
- Kingdom: Animalia
- Phylum: Chordata
- Class: Mammalia
- Order: Artiodactyla
- Infraorder: Cetacea
- Family: Delphinidae
- Genus: Globicephala
- Species: †G. etruriae

Binomial name
- †Globicephala etruriae Pilleri, 1987

= Globicephala etruriae =

Globicephala etruriae Temporal range: Pliocene

Extinct species of whale

Globicephala etruriae is an extinct species of pilot whale from the Pliocene of Italy. The type specimen was found in the Piacenzian coastal claystone at Volterra. It was named in 1987 by G. Pilleri.
