= Alexey Botvinov =

Ukrainian pianist (born 1964)

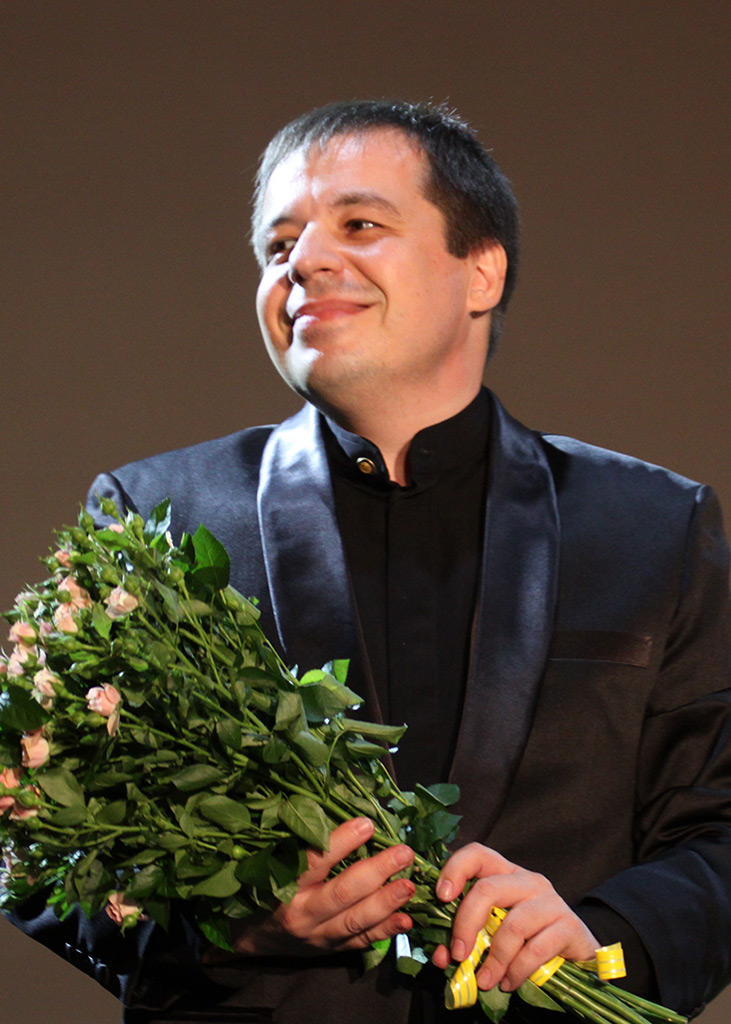

Background information
- Born: September 8, 1964 (age 61); Odesa, Ukrainian SSR, Soviet Union
- Genres: Classical music
- Occupation: Pianist
- Instrument: Piano
- Years active: 1983–present
- Website: www.botvinov.com.ua

Alexey Ivanovich Botvinov (Ukrainian: Олексій Іванович Ботвінов; born September 8, 1964) is a Ukrainian pianist. He is People's Artist of Ukraine, Knight of the Order of Merit of the Federal Republic of Germany, Knight of the Order of the Star of Italy, recipient of the Wilhelm Tell Award (2020) from the Swiss government and The platinum medal of the French Société académique Arts-Sciences-Lettres, and a member of the Presidential Council of the World Club of Odessites. He is the founder of the International Music Festival "Odessa Classics" and the All-Ukrainian Young Pianists Competition named after Serafima Mogilevskaya. Botvinov is regarded as one of the world's finest interpreters of Sergei Rachmaninoff's music. He has performed Goldberg Variations by Johann Sebastian Bach on stage more than 300 times. His repertoire includes over 30 concertos for piano with orchestra. He was the first Ukrainian musician in the years following Ukraine's independence to record an album with the renowned global label Deutsche Grammophon. He has successfully toured in over 40 countries.

== Biography ==
Alexey Botvinov was born on September 8, 1964, in Odesa to a family of musicians. His father, Ivan Dmitrievich Botvinov (1917–1980), was a composer and musicologist, serving as the head of the Music Theory Department and vice-rector of the Odesa Conservatory. His mother, Vera Alexandrovna Belyaeva (born 1943), is a pianist and accompanist at the Odesa Conservatory. After his parents' divorce and his mother's remarriage, Botvinov was raised from the age of nine by his stepfather, Anatoliy Duda (1946–2020), a People's Artist of Ukraine, tenor singer, and vocal teacher, who played a significant role in shaping Alexey as both a musician and a person.

Botvinov began his musical education in Odesa under Professor Serafima Mogilevskaya. From 1981 to 1985, he studied at the Odesa Conservatory under Professor Anatoliy Kardashov, graduating with honors.

In 1983, at the age of 19, he became the youngest participant and laureate of the 1st All-Union Rachmaninoff Competition in Moscow, after which he became a soloist of the Odesa Regional Philharmonic and a teacher at the conservatory. From 1987 to 1989, he completed an internship at the Moscow Conservatory under Professor Vera Gornostaeva.

Since 1994, Botvinov has lived abroad while retaining Ukrainian citizenship. He resides in Odesa, balancing performances as a soloist with the Odesa Regional Philharmonic and international tours.

== Career ==
Between 1994 and 1996, Botvinov lived in Düsseldorf, where the premiere of a ballet based on Robert Schumann's Kinderszenen marked the beginning of his fruitful collaboration with the renowned Swiss choreographer Heinz Spoerli.

Since 1996, he has combined an active touring career with the role of a guest soloist-pianist at the Zurich Ballet. Botvinov has consistently performed in Spoerli's ballet productions, playing music by Wolfgang Amadeus Mozart, Frédéric Chopin, Johannes Brahms, Sergei Prokofiev, Igor Stravinsky, Alexander Scriabin, Alfred Schnittke, and others. Since 1995, he has performed the Goldberg Variations by Johann Sebastian Bach, which became a signature piece for Spoerli's company and led to performances across nearly all of Europe, as well as in Canada, Japan, Israel, and South Africa.

Since 2001, the Goldberg Variations have been a permanent part of the repertoire of the Deutsche Oper Berlin. Botvinov's premiere performance of the piece in June 2001 was a sensation, earning high praise from the German press ("A fireworks display at the piano" – Berliner Kurier; "Botvinov is a stroke of luck for the Deutsche Oper" – Tagesspiegel). In 1996, a CD of the Goldberg Variations was released in Switzerland, immediately reaching second place on the classical music charts ("Superb recording!" – Le Figaro, Paris). Subsequent recordings by Botvinov were reviewed by the Neue Zürcher Zeitung: his Chopin was described as "incredibly beautiful," and his Brahms as "surprising in their unconventionality but convincing in every detail." Additional recordings in Switzerland include works by Sergei Rachmaninoff, as well as concertos by Bach and Mozart (a live recording with the Prague Philharmonic). Botvinov has performed at numerous music festivals, including the Chopin Festival in Poland and the Festspiel in Zurich.

In 2002, he served as a jury member at the Arthur Rubinstein International Piano Competition in Poland.

In August 2003, he was the "Artist in Residence" at the 15th International Festival in Murten, Switzerland, where he performed six concerts, both solo and with orchestras.

In October 2008, Botvinov initiated and realized a new project—a multimedia concert titled "Visual Reality of Music"—combining classical music with video installations in collaboration with the VJ group Videomatics. The European premiere took place with great success at the Odesa Philharmonic, featuring works by Bach, Rachmaninoff, Alexander Scriabin, Alemdar Karamanov, and Jan Freidlin. Beyond its artistic goals, the project has significant educational value, using the synthesis of music and visuals to engage audiences accustomed to the dynamic visual forms of television and computer screens. In 2009, the project was presented with immense success at the Moscow International House of Music, and an open-air concert on Sofia Square in Kyiv attracted around 5,000 spectators.

In November 2008, in Saint Petersburg, Botvinov, together with art historian, educator, violinist, and Nobel Concert expert Mikhail Kazinik, continued work on the largest publicistic television project in Russian history, Free Flight, at Igor Shadkhan's television studio. The 56 films of this series were broadcast on the channels TV Center and TVCI, covering hundreds of musical works composed over the past three centuries. In November 2008, on the Russian radio station Orpheus, Botvinov and Kazinik began a joint program series titled Ad Libitum, or in Free Flight, where they analyzed music from various eras and styles in a 30-minute non-stop dialogue format each week. From August 2009 to May 2010, Botvinov served on a voluntary basis as the artistic director of the Odesa National Academic Theater of Opera and Ballet. During this period, the theater hosted two premieres that became notable cultural events in Ukraine: the ballet "Nureyev Forever" and the opera "Turandot."

A groundbreaking project for the classical music world, "Goldberg. Reloaded," combines the pinnacle of European music—Bach's Goldberg Variations—with oriental rhythms by renowned Turkish percussionist Burhan Öçal, rooted in ancient Sufi traditions. The European premiere of "Reloaded" was a great success at the Svetlanovsky Hall of the Moscow International House of Music on September 19, 2011. Subsequent performances took place in Paris, Zurich, Basel, the Montreux Jazz Festival, the opening of the Istanbul International Film Festival, the National Philharmonic of Ukraine in Kyiv, the Odesa Regional Philharmonic, and the Akkerman Fortress.

The theatrical-musical project "Letter Writer. Elegy," created in 2011 based on Mikhail Shishkin's novel Letter Writer, marked Botvinov's directorial debut. He also authored the play and handled the set design. The project caused a sensation in Moscow and Saint Petersburg, and was performed multiple times with great success on the Odesa stage. In December 2012, the German-language version of the play premiered in Zurich with great success. Botvinov is the creator, artistic director, and main organizer of the International Music Festival "Odessa Classics," held annually in early June since 2015 in Odessa. In 2018, in honor of his first piano teacher, he founded the annual All-Ukrainian Young Pianists Competition named after Serafima Mogilevskaya.

From 2021t o 2023, together with Daniel Hope, he released the CDs "SCHNITTKE Works for Violin and Piano", «MUSIC FOR UKRAINE», «VALENTIN SILVESTROV» and «MUSIC FOR A NEW CENTURY» on the Deutsche Grammophon label.

From January to February 2022, Alexey Botvinov participated in the International Music Festival "MustonenFest," scheduled to take place in Tallinn, Estonia. The festival began on January 27, with the Odesa native's concert scheduled for February 2, 2022.

== Teachers ==
- Prof. Serafima Mogilevskaya, (1975–1982)
- Prof. Anatoliy Kardashov, (1982–1985)
- Prof. Vera Gornostaeva, (1987–1989)

== Recognition and awards ==
- 1983 – Laureate of the 1st All-Union Rachmaninoff Competition (Moscow)
- 1988 – Laureate of the 8th International Bach Competition (Leipzig)
- 1993 – Laureate of the 1st International Clara Schumann Competition (Düsseldorf)
- 2001 – Merited Artist of Ukraine
- 2007 – Musician of the Year, "People's Recognition" Rating, Odesa
- 2009 – Certificate of the Cabinet of Ministers of Ukraine for Contributions to Ukrainian Culture
- 2011 – Honorary Certificate of the Odesa City Council for Long-Term creative Work and High Professional Mastery
- 2011 – Order of Saint Demetrius (Tuptalo), Metropolitan of Rostov
- 2013 – Order of Saint Equal-to-the-Apostles Prince Volodymyr, 2nd Degree
- 2014 – Award of the Odesa Regional Council
- 2014 – Award of the Odesa Mayor "For Services to the City"
- 2015 – People's Artist of Ukraine
- 2019 – Badge of Honor of the Odesa Mayor
- 2020 – Knight of the Order of the Star of Italy
- 2020 – Swiss William Tell Award
- 2020 – Pride of Odessa, "People's Recognition. Odessite of the Year" Rating
- 2024 – The platinum medal of the Société académique ARTS-SCIENCES-LETTRES for outstanding services to the arts
- 2025 – Cross of the Order of Merit of the Federal Republic of Germany (Verdienstkreuz am Bande)

== Family ==
He is married to Elena (born 1977). The couple has a son, Mikhail, born in 2013.

== Interesting facts ==
As a child, Alexey Botvinov dreamed of becoming a football player, but at the age of 9, he firmly decided to pursue a career in music.

His favorite instrument is a black grand piano by the German company Hoffmann, manufactured before World War II. He has owned it since he was 15, and it is located in Odesa.

His favorite literary works include Letter Writer by Shishkin, Steppenwolf by Hermann Hesse, The Master and Margarita by Mikhail Bulgakov, and Chapaev and Void by Viktor Pelevin. His favourite literary genre is science fiction.

== Discography ==
- Johann Sebastian Bach – Goldberg Variations – alphadisc 970420
- Johannes Brahms – Händel Variations
- Frédéric Chopin – Seven Nocturnes – alphadisc 970908
- Bach – Mozart – Beretta – Live with the Musici de Praga
- Bach – Piano Concerto in D Minor BWV 1052, Mozart – Piano Concerto in D Minor KV 466 – Beretta – Bach and I / Mozart in the Sky – alphadisc 980117
- Botvinov Plays Rachmaninov – nurkultur 0203AB
- Schnittke Works for Violin and Piano. Daniel Hope, Alexey Botvinov – Deutsche Grammophon (DG) 00028948392346
- MUSIC FOR UKRAINE – Daniel Hope · Alexey Botvinov – Deutsche Grammophon (DG) 00028948630226
- VALENTIN SILVESTROV – Daniel Hope · Alexey Botvinov – Deutsche Grammophon (DG) 00028948637317
- MUSIC FOR A NEW CENTURY – Deutsche Grammophon (DG) 00028948641284
