= Jan Freidlin =

Soviet (Ukrainian SSR) and Israeli composer

Jan Freidlin (Hebrew: יאן פריידלין; Ukrainian: Ян Михайлович Фрейдлін) is a Soviet (Ukrainian SSR) and Israeli composer. He is the author of works for solo instruments, ensembles and orchestras, as well as music for film and television.

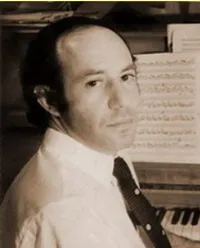
Jan Freidlin

== Biography ==
Jan Freidlin was born on 12 August 1944 in Chita. Already in 1946, at the age of two, he moved with his family to Odesa (Ukraine) — a city that would become Freidlin’s home for the next 44 years of his life. Here he began studying piano at the Glazunov Music School No.2, in the class of Maria Isaakovna Horvits. After graduating, he enrolled in the Odesa Music College (1959–1963), where he studied piano performance, composition, and music theory. Later, under the guidance of A. Kogan, he continued his studies in composition and music theory at the Odesa State Conservatory (1965-1971).

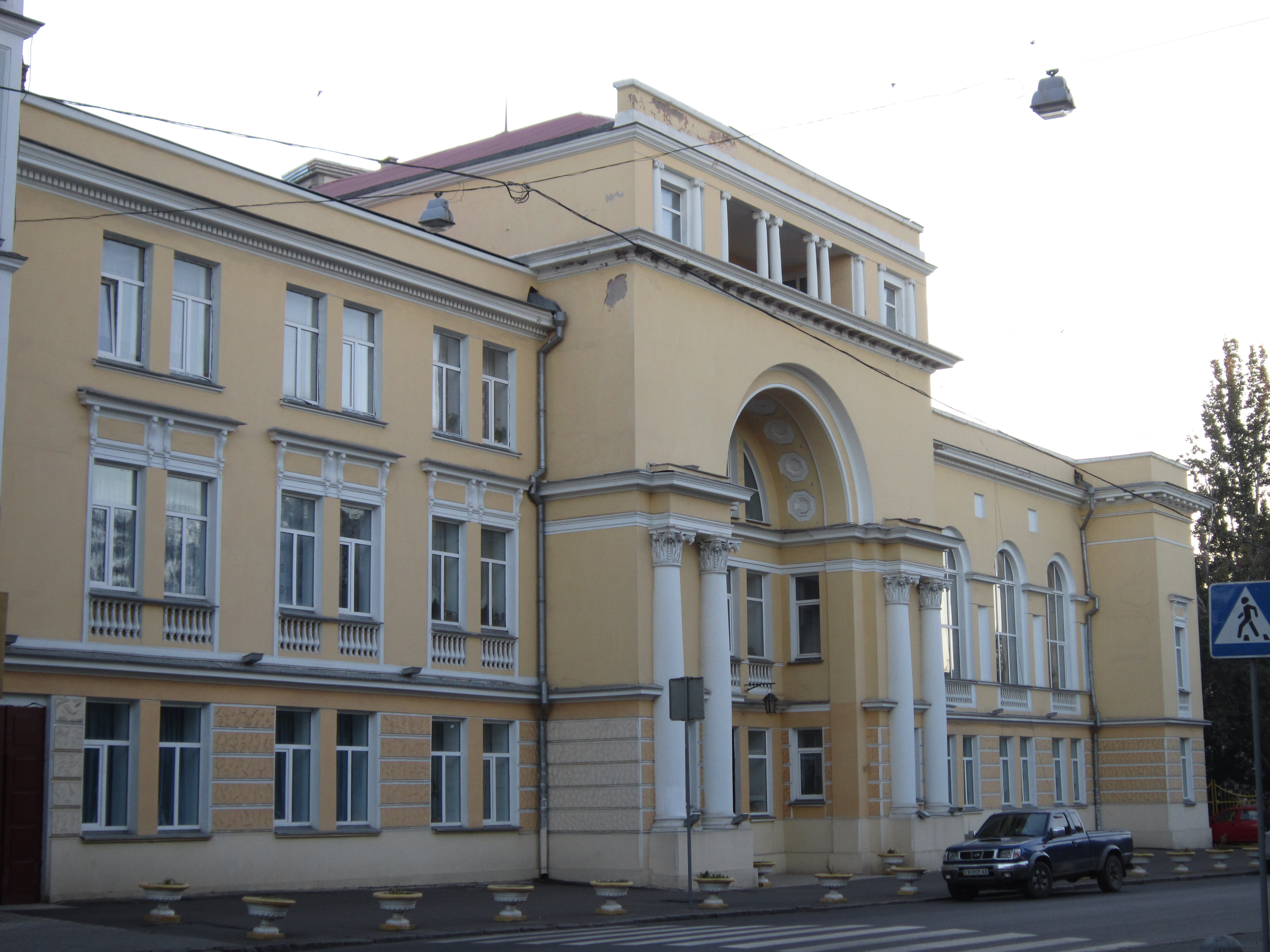
The Stolyarsky Special Music School in Odesa (Ukraine)

From 1974 to 1990, Freidlin was the head of the Music theory department at the School of Stolyarsky, a Special Music School in Odesa established by Pyotr Stolyarsky. He also served as the Artistic director and Principal conductor of the Odesa Philharmonic Theatre Jazz Orchestra.

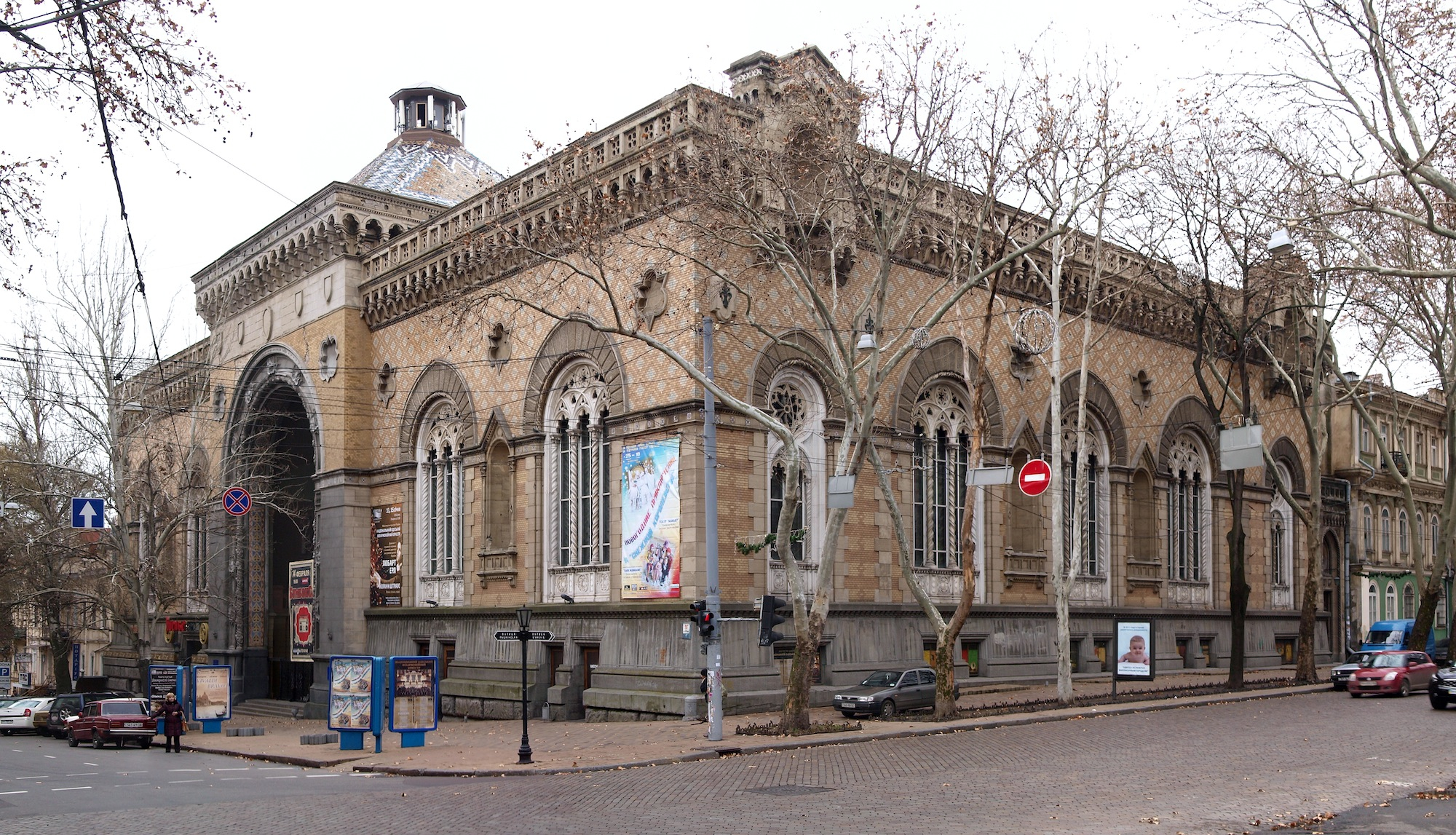
The Odesa Philharmonic Theater

From 1975 to 1990, Jan Freidlin was a member of the Union of Soviet Composers. Since 1990 he is a member of the ACUM (Israel) and CPCC (USA).

In 1990, Jan Freidlin emigrated to Israel and taught for three years (1990-1993) at the Rubin Academy of Music (currently the Buchmann-Mehta School of Music). Since 1991, Freidlin has been teaching composition at the Levinsky College of Music in Tel Aviv.

== Awards ==
- Grand Prix of Warna Cinema Festival (Bulgaria) for the original music to the movie “The Summer has begun” (1978)
- The ACUM Prize (Israel 1993) for “Miscenscenes” – Sonata for Violin and Cello
- The ISCM-Liberson Prize (Israel 1995) for Piano Trio No. 2
- 2nd Prize of G.F.A. (Claremont, CA, USA 1995) for “Letters from Arles” (van Gogh) for Guitar
- First Prize for “Twilight Music” (Fl., Vn., Pno.) of Tampa Bay International Composers’ Forum for Excellence (FL, USA, 2002)

== List of compositions ==
The compositions of Jan Freidlin include five symphonies, a ballet, concertos for various instruments, as well as pieces for solo instruments and chamber groups. He has also composed soundtracks for seven motion pictures, over 25 theatrical shows and several television shows.

Work	Year	Genre
Double Concerto, for flute, piano and string orchestra.	1974	Orchestra
Sonatina, for piano.	1974	Piano solo
Epitaph in Memory of D.D. Shostakovich.	1975	Orchestra
Looks, 6 portrey skethes for piano.	1975	Piano solo
Romantic Sonata (Sonata No.1), for piano.	1978	Piano solo
5 Duets, for violin and cello.	1979	Chamber music
Capriccio Concertante, for piano and orchestra / for two pianos.	1980	Orchestra / Chamber music
Violin Concerto, for violin, string orchestra and piano / for violin and piano (reduction).	1980-1992	Orchestra
Piano trio, for violin, cello and piano.	1981	Chamber music
11 Expressions, for piano.	1981	Piano solo
Expectation, for flute, violin, violoncello and piano.	1982	Chamber music
Theatre of Beranger, cycle for voice, violin, cello and piano.	1982	Chamber music
Spring Games, for flute, 2 string orchestras and percussions.	1983	Orchestra
Sonata in Three Letters, for violin and piano.	1983	Chamber music
Strophes of Sappho, five postludes for harp / for guitar.	1983	Harp/Guitar solo
Symphony No.2	1984	Orchestra
Three Serenades, for piano.	1984	Piano solo
Ballet Mystery “Guernica”, for flute, violin, cello, piano and synthesizer.	1984	Ballet
Seven Landscapes, for piano.	1985	Piano solo
Gothic Stained Glass Windows, chamber concerto for flute, string quartet and piano in 3 vitrages.	1985	Chamber music
Symphony No.3	1986	Orchestra
Immersion, Meditation for piano.	1986	Piano solo
Cello Sonata "in memory of my Father", for cello and piano.	1986	Chamber music
Lullaby to Vita, for piano.	1986-2021	Piano solo
String Rhapsody, for chamber / string orchestra.	1987	Orchestra
String Rhapsody (to Alexander Rovenko)	1987	Orchestra
Prelude, Choral & Toccata, for two pianos.	1987	Chamber music
Munch Sonata, for violin and cello.	1987-2023	Chamber music
The Glass Beads Games, 5 meditations to words by H. Hesse for voice, cello, piano and synthesizer.	1988	Chamber music
Piano Concerto No.2 , for piano and orchestra in 5 Pictures.	1988	Orchestra
Double Concerto, for violin, piano and string orchestra.	1988	Orchestra
A Little Morning Music, for two violins.	1989	Chamber music
Reflections, for flute, oboe, clarinet, bassoon, string quartet and piano.	1993	Chamber music
Twilight Music, for flute, violin and piano.	1994	Chamber music
Cello Concerto, for cello, string orchestra and vibraphone.	1994	Orchestra
Letters From Arles, for guitar.	1994	Guitar solo
The Flute's Day, for flute.	1995	Flute solo
August Morning, cycle for women's choir to words by Machi Tawara in Hebrew.	1995	Choir
Autumn Ballade, for violin and piano.	1995	Chamber music
Piano Trio No.2, for violin, cello and piano (in memory of Andrey Tarkovsky).	1995	Chamber music
Sonata in Three Visions, for harp.	1996	Harp solo
Enigma, for bass trombone and harp.	1996	Chamber music
Winter Ballade, for trombone and piano (to Nitzan Haroz).	1996	Chamber music
Music of the Passing Summer, for flute, viola and harp.	1996	Chamber music
Recollections, 8 pieces for piano (to Michal Tal).	1996	Piano solo
Return to the Grass of Childhood, for piano.	1997	Piano solo
Pathway of Orpheus, for flute and harp.	1997	Chamber music
Circles on the Water, for piano.	1997	Piano solo
Winter ballade, for cello and piano.	1997	Chamber music
Suite Tricolore, for flute, cello and piano.	1998	Chamber music
Waterscape, for harp (to Helvia Briggen).	1998	Harp solo
Sonata of the Wanderings, for cello and guitar.	1998	Chamber music
The Last Leaf (after O' Henry), for guitar (dedicated to Gr. Nisnevich)	1998	Guitar solo
Venetian Concerto, for cello and piano.	1999	Chamber music
Winds' Suite, for guitar (dedicated to K. Yamashita)	1999	Guitar solo
Quiet Sonata, for flute and piano.	1999	Chamber music
Mist Over the Lake, for clarinet and guitar / for various instr. solo and harp.	1999	Chamber music
Three Ancient Dances, for violin and guitar.	1999	Chamber music
Rondo, for chamber beginners orchestra and piano.	1999	Orchestra
Awakening, for flute, guitar and harp.	2000	Chamber music
Italian Album, for clarinet.	2000	Clarinet solo
The Moon Triptych, for guitar (dedicated to L. Brady)	2000	Guitar solo
Two pieces (Towards the Light & Ironical Rondo), for trombone and piano.	2000	Chamber music
Flowers in Frames, for string quartet.	2000	Chamber music
Lorelei, for trumpet and piano / for trombone and piano.	2000	Chamber music
Deep Water Blues, for baritone saxophone and piano.	2000	Chamber music
Sea-Shadow Waltz, for trumpet and trombone with piano / for soprano saxophone and tenor saxophone with piano.	2000	Chamber music
Song from the Past & Winding Staircase, for trumpet or clarinet and piano.	2000	Chamber music
2 x 2, 2 Bagatelles for 2 clarinets (Bb).	2000	Chamber music
Moods, for oboe.	2001	Oboe solo
Colour Box, piano note-book for the young.	2001	Piano solo
Renaissance Partita, for wind quintet.	2001	Chamber music
Youth Sonatina, for violin and piano.	2001	Chamber music
Madrigal, for brass quintet.	2001	Chamber music
Fiesta, for brass quintet.	2001	Chamber music
Eurydice's Shadow, concerto piccolo for flute and harp.	2001	Concerto
A Little Theater Buffo, for trombone and piano.	2001	Chamber music.
Ancient Dances, for clarinet (Bb) and string quartet.	2001	Chamber music
Jazz Album, for piano.	2001	Piano solo
Chorale Sonata, for piano.	2002	Piano solo
The River of Hopes, for alto saxophone and harp.	2002	Chamber music
Elegy, for six celli.	2002	Chamber music
Duo-Partita, for flute and cello.	2002	Chamber music
Simple Magic Gardens, for piano.	2002	Piano solo
Barcelo Novelle, suite for guitar.	2002	Guitar solo
MonoOpera, for violin.	2003	Violin solo
Suite Buffo, for two celli.	2003	Chamber music
Two Snake's Dance, for cello and double bass.	2003	Chamber music
Forest Visions, for piano.	2003	Piano solo
Kafka Sonata, for clarinet (Bb) and guitar.	2004	Chamber music
Romantic Concerto, for trombone, piano and strings / for trombone and piano (reduction).	2004	Orchestra
Hommage à Claude Monet, for harp.	2004	Harp solo
Breath, for string / chamber orchestra (to Igor Shavruk).	2004	Orchestra
The Evening Songs, for a mixed choir a-cappella (Song acting in 7 pictures after V. Bryusov).	2004	Choir
Tenderness, for flexible duet (certain combinations of violin/viola/cello/flute/oboe/English horn/various clarinets/various saxophones/bassoon/marimba and piano/harp/guitar)	2004	Chamber music
Divertimento, for flute and cello.	2004	Chamber music
Waterspring Song, for soprano saxophone and piano.	2004	Chamber music
Dancing Pines Waltz, for alto saxophone and piano / for violin and guitar / for flute and guitar.	2004	Chamber music
Hymn to the Sun, for tenor saxophone and piano.	2004	Chamber music
Three Capriccios, for flute.	2004-2014	Flute solo
Rainy Days' Rhapsody, for cello and piano.	2005	Chamber music
Fjord, reflection for harp.	2005	Harp solo
Ballade in Black & White, for piano (to I. Faliks).	2005	Piano solo
Travel Suite, for chamber / string orchestra.	2005	Orchestra
Contemplation, for piano with string / chamber orchestra.	2005	Orchestra
Forgotten Intermezzo, for chamber / string orchestra.	2006	Orchestra
Poem of the Contrasts (commissioned by Israel Philharmonic Orchestra).	2006	Orchestra
Light Sonatina, for flute and piano.	2006	Chamber music
TangO'Clock in five scenes, for guitar.	2006	Guitar solo
Kafka Sonata, for violin and guitar.	2006	Chamber music
Light Sonatina, for flute and piano.	2006	Chambee music
4 x 4, suite for trombone quartet.	2007	Chamber music
Circles on the Water, for piano with string / chamber orchestra.	2007	Orchestra
Masks, for guitar.	2007	Guitar solo
Morning Breeze, jazz piece for guitar and harp.	2007	Chamber music
Guernica, misteria after P. Picasso for clarinet (Bb) and guitar / cello and guitar.	2007	Chamber music
Path to Childhood, for clarinet and guitar / alto saxophone.	2007	Chamber music
Unspoken Voices, requiem in remembrance of the Holocaust victims for Guitar.	2007	Guitar solo
Candlelight Sonata, for piano.	2008	Piano solo
Lament in memory of Theo and Vincent Van Gogh, for string quintet / for string orchestra.	2008	Chamber music/ Orchestra
Capriccio brioso, for violin and piano.	2008	Chamber music
From the Past..., for cello.	2008	Cello solo
Idee Fixe, for guitar quartet.	2008	Chamber music
Easy Dance Partita, for violin and piano.	2009	Chamber music
Mediterranean Suite, for cello.	2009	Cello solo
Memento mori, poem for organ.	2009	Organ solo
Minuet-Marionette, for double bass and piano (to Ron Merhavi).	2009	Chamber music
Colour Suite, for string / chamber orchestra.	2009	Orchestra
Broceliande Concerto, for soprano saxophone and piano.	2009	Chamber music
Joyful Concertino, for two pianos.	2009	Chamber music
5 Venetian Glass Poems, for guitar.	2009	Guitar solo
Lift of the Times, multi-stylistic suite for violin and piano.	2010	Chamber music
Camille's Waltz, for guitar duo.	2010	Chamber music
Concerto Tranquillo, for harp and string orchestra.	2010	Orchestra
Vermeer Triptych, for baroque violin, viola d'amore and harpsichord.	2010	Chamber music
Sherlock's Violin, dithyramb-grotesque for violin and piano.	2010	Chamber music
Lyrical Sonata, for viola and piano.	2010	Chamber music
Concerto Piccolo, for baroque trio.	2010	Chamber music
Eclogue to Echo, for flute, oboe and piano (dedicated to Ecoensemble trio).	2010	Chamber music
Starry Night Sonata, for guitar duo (after V. van Gogh).	2010	Chamber music
Grottesque & Buffonade, for flute, oboe and piano (dedicated to Ecoensemble trio).	2011	Chamber music
Lullaby to the Wind, for violin and piano.	2011	Chamber music
Morning Water Lilies, for two harps.	2011	Chamber music
Recitative & Sonnet to Beatrice, for viola d'amore and harpsichord.	2011	Chamber music
Brodsky Recitation (Symphony No.4), for string / chamber orchestra.	2011	Orchestra
Prague Kaleidoscope, for violin and guitar (dedicated to Duo TEREZ).	2011	Chamber music
Delphic Music Games, for flute and guitar (to Duo Orfeo).	2011	Chamber music
Rhapsodist & Muse, for mezzo-soprano and guitar.	2011	Chamber music
Melody, for any solo instrument with piano (to Sergey Ship).	2012	Chamber music
Winter Ballad, for trombone and piano.	2012	Chamber music
Water-mill Lit By Sunshine, for four harps.	2012	Chamber music
Sonata-Serenade, for violin and piano.	2012	Chamber music
Double Concerto, for 2 clarinets (Bb) and string / chamber orchestra.	2012	Orchestra
Springtime Clouds, fantasia for flute, viola and harp.	2012	Chamber music
Aloborada After The Rain, for harp.	2012	Harp solo
Alpine Brook, for two harps.	2012	Chamber music
Winter Ballad, for cello and piano.	2012	Chamber music
Bluesy Cello Mood, for cello.	2012	Cello solo
Two Poetic Pictures, for piano.	2012	Piano solo
Solitudes, 3 lonely pages for piano.	2012	Piano solo
Bluesy Wave, for piano (to Igor Shavruk)	2012	Piano solo
Delft-Suite, for viola da gamba (to Ernst Stolz).	2013	Viola da gamba solo
August Pastoral, for clarinet and piano (to Kaja Dubiel).	2013	Chamber music
A Little Masquerade, for virtuosic violin (to Alessandro Cazzato).	2013	Violin solo
Romancero Sonata, for guitar (to Rene Mora)	2013	Guitar solo
Voice of the oblivion, for string/chamber orchestra / for violin and piano.	2013	Orchestra / Chamber music
Autumn Dreams, two pieces for piano.	2013	Piano solo
Medieval Diptych, for viola d'amore.	2013	Viola d’amore solo
Four Stories, for piano.	2013-2016	Piano solo
Lake Reflectiono, for flute and harp.	2014	Chamber music
Nostalgias (Symphony No.5), for string orchestra.	2014	Orchestra
Dance of the Little Ghosts, for flute quartet.	2014	Chamber music
Pathway of Orpheus, for flute, cello, guitar and harpsichord.	2014	Chamber music
Break-point, for Bb clarinet / for clarinet and piano / for clarinet and string quartet / for clarinet and string orchestra.	2015	Chamber music/ Orchestra
Triptych Times, for flute, harp and string Orchestra.	2015	Orchestra
Forest Music, for piano with string orchestra (to Natalia Busanova).	2015	Orchestra
Not Far From Ipanema, for string orchestra (to Igor Shavruk)	2015	Orchestra
Guernica, for harp.	2016	Harp solo
Aquatic Poem, for harp.	2016	Harp solo
Vermeer Triptych, for string / chamber orchestra.	2016	Orchestra
Ariadna’s Thread, symphonic poem.	2016	Orchestra
Dipthyh, for violin and piano.	2017	Chamber music
Homage to Renoir, for flute and piano.	2017	Chamber music
Lightwing Zephyros, for flute.	2017	Flute solo
Little Piano Diary, six short pieces for piano.	2017	Piano solo
Last Work by Van Gogh, for piano.	2017	Piano solo
Bergen Smiling, for guitar (to Knut-Martin Rasmussen)	2017	Guitar solo
Sonata-Ballade, for guitar (dedicated to Miguel Bonachea)	2018	Guitar solo
River Song, for flute and piano (to Ecoensemble Duo).	2018	Chamber music
In the Old Chapel, for flute solo	2018	Flute solo
Promenade, for viola (to Daniel Rubenstein)	2018	Viola solo
Oriental Pantomime, for guitar and mandoline.	2018	Chamber music
Song of Dead Sea, for flute alto (to Nozomi Kanda)	2018	Flute alto solo
Dancing Flowers, for viola and guitar.	2018	Chamber music
Blind Walking, for cello.	2018	Cello solo
Skyscape, for piano.	2018	Piano solo
Le Ballon Rouge, for piano (after A. Lamoriss’ film).	2018	Piano solo
Shadows in the Forest, for piano.	2018	Piano solo
At the Tombstone of Josef Brodsky, for piano.	2018	Piano solo
Mysterious Grotto, fantasy for piano.	2018	Piano solo
Dawn Dreams, for piano.	2018	Piano solo
Flowery Alleys, for piano.	2018	Piano solo
The Road Leading Only to the Sea, for piano.	2018	Piano solo
Dew at Down, for piano.	2018	Piano solo
Alley Birds, rhapsody for flute and piano.	2019	Chamber music
2 Postludes after J. Prever, for violin.	2019	Violin solo
Piano Escape Sonata, for piano.	2019	Piano solo
The Lost Letter, for piano.	2019	Piano solo
Sadness of the Night Garden, for piano.	2019	Piano solo
How to Paint a Bird’s Portrait, for piano (after a poem by J. Prever).	2019	Piano solo
Lament pour Camille Claudel, for piano.	2019	Piano solo
The Seasons’ Suite, for piano.	2019	Piano solo
Illusory Alice’s Waltz, for piano.	2019	Piano solo
Teddy Bear Suite, for piano.	2020	Piano solo
Dive Into The Sweet Music, for trombone and piano.	2020	Chamber music
Morning Moon, little poem for violin and piano.	2020	Chamber music
Scherzo Militare, for brass band.	2020	Orchestra
Quasi Valse, for piano.	2020	Piano solo
Cheerful mood, for piano.	2020	Piano solo
Sonata-Reverie (Sonata No.4), for piano.	2020	Piano solo
Nature Morte (No.1-3), for piano.	2020	Piano solo
Piano Album 2022, for piano.	2020-2021	Piano solo
The Jumping Smiles, burlesque for piano.	2021	Piano solo
Sinfonietta (No.1, Dolorosa), for piano,	2022	Piano solo
Forest Birds, for violin and guitar.	2023	Chamber music
Harlequin, scherzino for violin.	2023	Violin solo
Lament of all Children who innocently perished, for violin.	2024	Violin solo
Sonata in Three Recollections, for violin and piano (dedicated to Andrii Murza).	2024	Chamber music
Romance at Dawn, for trombone and piano.	2024	Chamber music
Madrigal, for string sextet.	2024	Chamber music
Dulcinee Vision, for clarinet in B and piano.	2024	Chamber music
Sinfonia (No.2, Recitativo), for piano.	2024	Piano solo
Sinfonia (No.3, Espressivo), for piano.	2024	Piano solo
Mazurka (Homage to Chopin), for piano (dedicated to Naoko).	2024	Piano solo
Greenwood Rhapsody, for piano (dedicated to Naoko).	2024	Piano solo
Sinfonia (No.4, Capriccioso), for piano (dedicated to Naoko).	2024	Piano solo
Memorandum Poem (to Partick Modiano), for piano (dedicated to Naoko).	2024	Piano solo
Canzone to Beatrice, for piano (dedicated to Naoko)	2024	Piano solo
The Little Prince Adventures, for piano.	2024	Piano solo
Take seven, rhythmic caprice for piano.	2024	Piano solo
Colours of Sadness, for piano (to Vladimir Nabokov).	2024	Piano solo
Dreaming Sand Castles, for string quintet (2 violins, 2 violas, cello).	2025	Chamber music
Romance at Dawn, for horn and piano.	2025	Chamber music
Lovely Rag, for trombone and piano.	2025	Chamber music
Night Seine Blues, for violin and piano/ for viola and piano/ for cello and piano/ for flute and piano/ for oboe and piano/ for english horn and piano/ for Bb clarinet and piano/ for Bb bass clarinet and piano/ for Bb soprano or tenor saxophone and piano/ for Eb alto or baritone saxophone and piano/ for bassoon and piano/ for Bb trumpet and piano/ for Bb euphonium or baritone and piano/ for trombone or tuba and piano.	—	Chamber music
Swinging Reed Song, for Bb clarinet.	—	Clarinet solo
