= Mikhail Kazinik =

Mikhail Kazinik Михаил Казиник
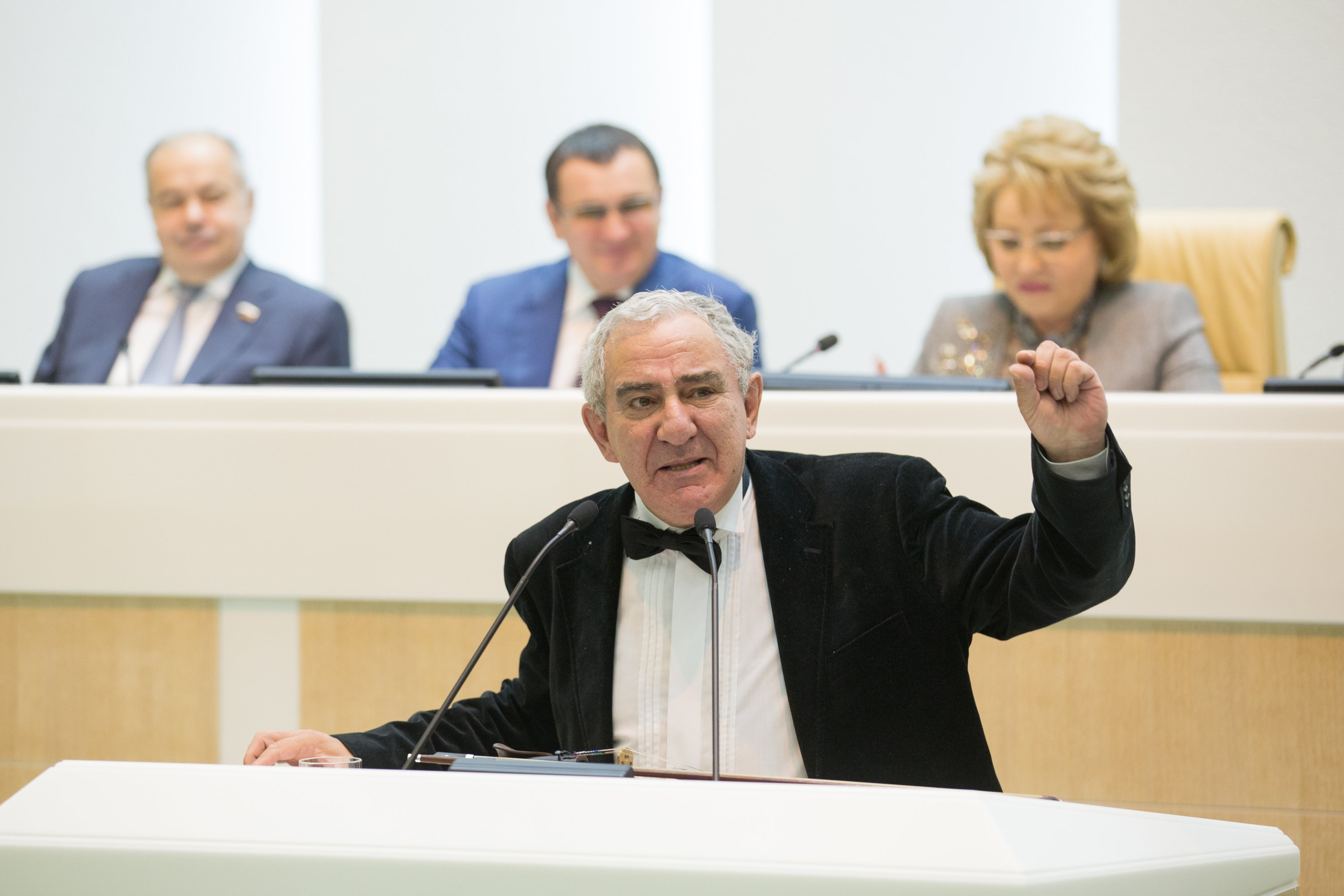

Background information
- Born: Mikhail Semyonovich Kazinik; 13 November 1951 (age 74); Leningrad, USSR
- Genres: Classical
- Instruments: Violin, Piano
- Website: www.kazinik.ru

External image
- Mikhail Kazinik in his youth

Mikhail Semyonovich Kazinik (Russian: Михаил Семёнович Казиник; born on 13 November 1951 in Leningrad, USSR) is a music lecturer, teacher, television and radio presenter, and a popularizer of classical music.

== Biography ==
Mikhail Semenovich Kazinik was born in 1951 in Leningrad into a Jewish family. In 1953, the family moved to Vitebsk. From the age of six he began to play the violin and piano. In 1958 he entered the Children's Music School No. 1 in the violin class. In 1968 he continued his studies at the Vitebsk School of Music. In 1970 he entered the Belarusian State Conservatory in Minsk. In 1975 he graduated from the conservatory. In 1975-1990, he was a soloist and lecturer and musicologist at the Belarusian State Philharmonic Society and gave lectures and concerts in various cities of the USSR. After the events of August 1991, he decided to move to Sweden for permanent residence, settled in Stockholm and received Swedish citizenship. He collaborated with director Yuri Lederman and his "Teaterstudio Lederman" theater in Stockholm, took part in the production of the play "Mozart against Salieri".

== Television and radio broadcasts ==
In the 2000s, Mikhail Kazinik presented the television project "Ad Libitum or in Free Flight" (program manager Igor Shadkhan, director Natalya Kugashova). In this series of musical and journalistic programs, Mikhail Kazinik tells about the work of various composers and proves that classical music can fully exist in modern life. The programs were broadcast on the Russian TV channels TV Center and TVCI. Initially, 12 episodes dedicated to composers were shot: "The Bach Effect", "The Schubert Effect", "The Mozart Effect", "The Chopin Effect", and so on. Then additional issues were made, a total of 56 episodes were released. The shooting took place in Sweden at the cottage of Mikhail Kazinik and in various scenic spots. 12 episodes of this television show were also shown on the Swedish television channel Axess TV.

In 2007, Igor Shadkhan’s film "Flight over Vitebsk" was released, dedicated to the city of Vitebsk and Marc Chagall. Mikhail Kazinik appeared in this film as a tour guide in his native city.

Since 2007 — author and presenter of the program "Music that has returned" at the Orpheus radio station. The program was created with the support of the Federal Agency on Press and Mass Communications of the Russian Federation. For the implementation of this project, the radio station was awarded the Radio Mania 2015 Prize.

In 2009 — 2012, 2016 — author and presenter of the program "Secret signs of culture" on the radio "Silver Rain".

Since 2011, he has been the host of the author's program, "Musical score that Changed the World" on the "Dozhd" TV channel.

== Concert activity ==
Mikhail Kazinik periodically gives lectures, concerts and creative evenings in different countries of the world: in Russia, Belarus, Ukraine, Latvia, Scandinavian countries, Germany, Netherlands, United States. At his speeches, he talks about the history of art and classical music, seeks to captivate the audience with it. Mikhail Kazinik’s concerts are designed for the widest audience and conducts concerts for children where he tries to rid them of fear of classical music.

Since 2011, together with the director and producer Galina Poltorak, he annually holds the international music festival "Days of Kazinik" in Riga. The competition of young instrumentalists and vocalists "Rising Stars" took place at this festival.

== School education ==
Mikhail Kazinik considers it necessary to carry out the reform of school education both in Russia and in the world. In his opinion, the modern school forms a "clip thinking" in the child, since he receives disparate knowledge in different subjects that is not interconnected. In his opinion, the school "filled their heads like a bag of straw, stuffed with a bunch of information, 90% of which they would never need, and did not give the paradigm of knowledge, thirst for knowledge, craving for knowledge, a way of knowing through culture, through art, through mathematics".

Mikhail Kazinik realizes his vision of school education in the Chelyabinsk private school "7 keys", where children learn according to his method of "complex-wave lessons". Classes are held in a game form. Another experiment to create the "School of the Future" he conducts in Vyksa. In October 2017, in Tyumen, according to the methodology of Kazinik, the School of the Future "Culture" opened, which lasted until April next year.

== Views ==
Mikhail Kazinik is a staunch anti-communist. According to him, the best people of the country were destroyed in the Gulag. At the same time, he admits that under communism there were beautiful ideas and myths.

He is critical of the modern model of democracy. True democracy considers the power of thinkers who think about the future.

== Family ==
Father — Semyon Mikhailovich Kazinik, mining engineer. Originally from the town of Chereya, Chashniksky district of Belarus.

Mother - Bella Grigoryevna Levina, worked at the KIM hosiery and knitwear factory in Vitebsk. Originally from the Belarusian city of Chashniki.

Wife — Tatyana. Son — Boris Kazinik (born in 1975).

== Publications ==
=== Books ===
- Казиник М. (2010). Тайны гениев (4-е изд ed.). М.: Легейн. ISBN 978-5-91491-025-6.
- Казиник М. (2010). Тайны гениев-2 или Волновые пути к музыке. М.: Динатон. ISBN 978-5-91751-004-0.
- Казиник М. (2014). Приобщение. Слово. Музыка. Жизнь. М.: Дельфис. ISBN 978-5-93366-030-9.
- Казиник М. (2015). Буравчик в стране Света. М.: Бослен. ISBN 978-5-91187-225-0.
- Казиник М. (2017). Погружение в музыку, или Тайны гениев-2. М.: АСТ. ISBN 978-5-17-098898-3.

=== Magazine Articles ===
- Казиник М. Нужны активные поиски (О проблемах лекторской работы) // Советская музыка. — 1985. — № 8. — С. 71—73.
- Казиник М. Специалисты, отзовитесь! (О проблемах музыкальных жанров) // Советская музыка. — 1985. — № 11. — С. 77.
- Казиник М. Ребёнок и музыка (О музыкальном воспитании младших школьников) // Музыка в школе. — 1986. — № 1. — С. 36—39.
- Казиник М. Я — на нашей планете…: [Беседа] / Вела Шлихтина Ю. // Музыкальная академия. — 1996. — № 3—4. — С. 132—136.
- Королёва Т. П. Музыка для всех: диалог о ключевых проблемах музыкального просвещения и воспитания / Т. П. Королёва, М. С. Казиник // Столичное образование сегодня. — Минск, 2006. — № 5. — С. 16—32.
- Нашу публику я люблю больше [Текст] / М. Казиник; беседовала О. Русанова // Музыкальная жизнь. — 2015. — № 3. — С. 48—49. — ISSN 0131-2383.
- Педагогика искусства в системе общего образования / Е. Б. Зотова // Искусство в школе. — 2013. — № 6. — С. 8—9 . — ISSN 0869-4966.
