= Music of Ukraine =

The music of Ukraine covers diverse and multiple component elements of Western and Eastern European music. It has indigenous Slavic and Christian elements. Ukrainian lands were the musical heartland of the former Russian Empire. The empire's first professional music school, established in Ukraine during the mid-18th century, produced its early musicians and composers.

Many 19th-century Ukrainian composers belonged to a Ukrainian national school of music that was influenced by folk tunes and their lyrics. Among famous composers who were born or lived in the territory of modern Ukraine are Dimitry of Rostov, Dmytro Bortniansky, Maksym Berezovsky, Artemy Vedel, Franz Xavier Mozart, Isaak Dunayevsky, Rheinhold Gliere, Sergei Prokofiev, Yuriy Oliynyk and Mykola Roslavets.

Several Ukrainian minority groups have their own musical traditions.

== History ==
=== Medieval and Early Modern eras ===
A monument to Boyan in Pereyaslav

==== Music of Kyivan Rus' ====
No records of secular music have been preserved from the times of Kyivan Rus'. However, it is known that Rus' princes were mentioned in songs created with the aim to praise them and their military exploits. Among medieval performers mentioned in documents from that period are Boyan and Mitusa. Elements of Rus' musical tradition have been preserved in bylina songs of modern-day Northern Russia. Among musical instruments widespread during the Rus' period were gusli, wooden trumpets and horns, bubon and various flutes. Among the princely and boyar elite, imported instruments such as metal trumpets, pipe organs, bowed string instruments, psaltery, lute, cimbalom etc. Travelling musicians including skomorokhs, were widespread during that time.

Church music of Rus' developed on the base of Byzantine Greek and Bulgarian examples. Starting from the mid-11th century, a local musical school developed at the Kyiv Pechersk Lavra, leading to the emergence of Kievan chant. An important source for the development of music in Ukrainian lands was the folk tradition, represented by songs dedicated to seasonal rituals, family and marriage etc.

==== Early Modern period ====
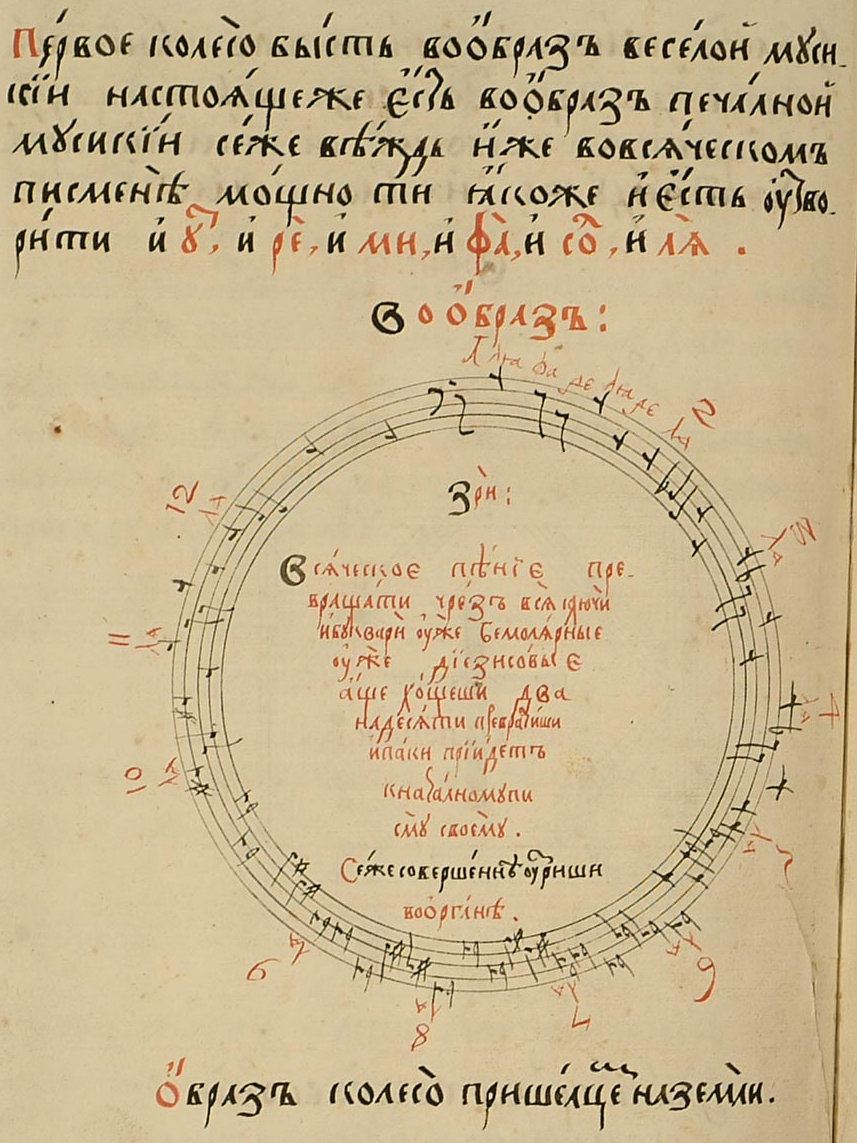
A page from Dyletskyi's Musical Grammar (1675)

No examples of recorded music in Ukraine have been preserved from the period of 14-16th centuries. However, it is known that numerous musicians of Ukrainian origin were active at the courts of Polish monarchs Władysław II Jagiełło, Jadwiga and Sigismund I the Old. A document from 1586 mentions the existence of a choir at the Lviv Dormition Brotherhood, which practiced polyphonic singing. Starting from the late 16th century, influence of Western European musical notation becomes visible. New varieties of chant emerged during that period under the influence of Balkan music and local trends.

During the 17th century, guilds of musicians existed in Lviv, Lutsk, Chernihiv, Kyiv and Kharkiv. This period saw the rapid development of part song in Ukrainian lands. In 1675 the first book on musical theory to have been written by a Ukrainian author was published by Mykola Dyletskyi, and soon became popular around Eastern Europe. Ukrainian singing was praised by foreign travellers who visited the country during that time, such as Paul of Aleppo. Starting from 1652, groups of Ukrainian musicians travelled to Moscow, establishing themselves in the Muscovite Tsardom.

During the Ukrainian Baroque period, music was an important discipline for those receiving a higher education. It had an important place in the curriculum of the Kyiv-Mohyla Academy. Many of the nobility were skillful musicians, with Cossack leaders—including Ivan Mazepa, Semen Paliy, and Ivan Sirko—being accomplished players of the kobza, bandura, or torban.

=== 18th and 19th centuries ===
==== Music in the Cossack Hetmanate ====
A lira and masks used in traditional vertep performance

Starting from the late 17th century, a major role in the development of Ukrianian music was played by the Kyiv Mohyla Academy, which housed an orchestra and whose printing house published collections of notes for church songs. Among notable musical personalities connected with the Kyiv Academy was the composer Artemy Vedel. First publication of printed notes in Ukrainian lands took place in 1707 in Lviv. In 1791 the first printed collection of kant and psalm songs was published in Pochayiv.

The first professional music academy in the Russian Empire was established in Hlukhiv, capital of the Cossack Hetmanate, flourishing at the court of hetman Kyrylo Rozumovskyi under the influence of composer Andriy Rachynskyi. Its students were taught to sing, and to play violin and the bandura. Notable scions of that school were composers Maksym Berezovskyi and Dmytro Bortnianskyi. Musical connections between Ukraine and Western Europe greatly increased during the 18th century, with Rozumovskyi's son acting as one of the patrons of Beethoven.

An important element of Ukrainian musical culture, which flourished during the 18th century, was vertep theatre. With the incorporation of Ukrainian lands by the Russian Empire, active cultural exchange started. Bandurists and a Ukrainian choir led by Marko Poltoratskyi performed at the court of Elizabeth of Russia. Other notable Ukrainian performers of the time included Timofiy Bilohradskyi, who studied the lute under Sylvius Leopold Weiss in Dresden, his niece the soprano Yelizaveta Belogradskaya, and the court bandurist Alexey Razumovsky. Many of the Russian Empire's earliest composers were likewise of Ukrainian ethnicity. At the same time, the mass migration of Ukrainian performers to Moscow and other parts of the empire produced a negative effect on the development of Ukrainian music. In parallel, serf theatres, whose plays included musical performances, were organized in Ukrainian lands based on Muscovite examples.

==== Ukrainian music under the Russian Empire ====
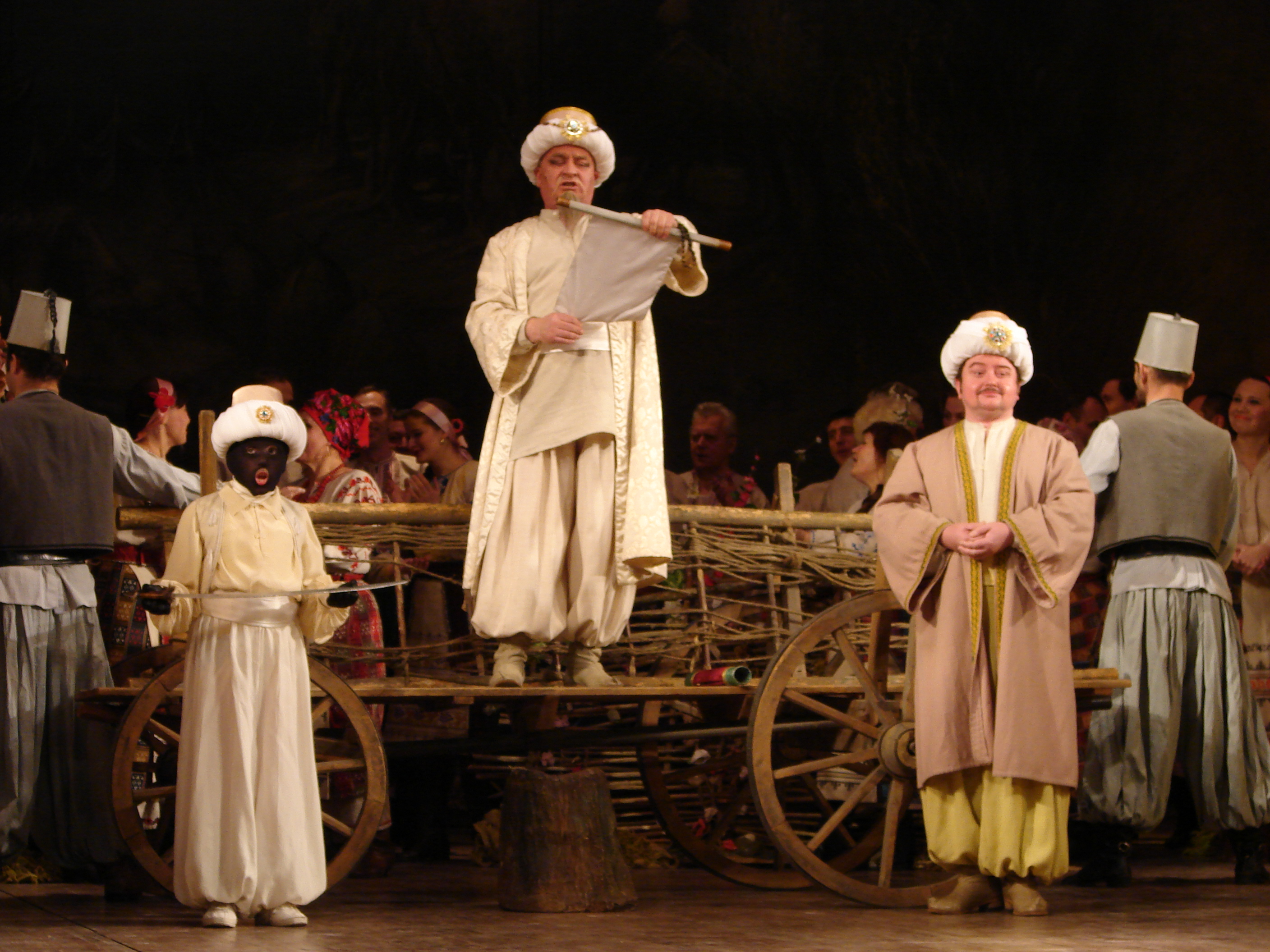
A scene from a modern production of the opera Zaporozhian Beyond the Danube by Semen Hulak-Artemovskyi

In general, 19th century in Ukraine was characterized with prevalence of vocal music over instrumental compositions, which demonstrated the preservation of rich folk and religious musical traditions. The opening of the first professional theatres in Kyiv (1803) and Odesa (1810), which staged works on national themes, played an important role in the formation of Ukrainian opera. Starting from the early 19th century, Western European influences led to the emergence of numerous piano works by Ukrainian composers such as Vladyslav Zaremba, Vasyl Pashchenko and Mykhailo Zavadskyi, who popularized the folk-inspired genres of dumka and shumka songs.

Ukrainian folk tradition also had a great influence on musical theatre tradition, exemplified by the use of popular themes in plays by Catterino Cavos (The Cossack-Poet) and Ivan Kotliarevskyi (Natalka Poltavka, Moskal-Charivnyk). Amalgamation of Western and Ukrainian musical traditions continued during the second half of the 19th century and became most visible in works by Semen Hulak-Artemovskyi (Zaporozhian Beyond the Danube), Petro Nishchynskyi (Nazar Stodolia), Petro Sokalskyi and Mykola Arkas. A number of musical plays for Ukrainian theatre were authored by Marko Kropyvnytskyi.

Two piano works by Mykola Lysenko
Dream Op. 12

By a cradle («При колисці»)

During the 19th century, musical nationalism arose in Europe, characterized by an emphasis on national musical elements, and associated with the growth of national consciousness of European peoples. A Ukrainian nationalist movement in music appeared during the late 19th century, in which Ukrainian writers, poets, and professional musicians used arrangements of traditional folk songs. The emergence of a distinct Ukrainian national school in music is closely connected with the name of Mykola Lysenko. A composer, conductor and pianist, Lysenko was a key figure in the development of Ukrainian national music. Under the influence of narodnik ideas, he studied kobzar dumas and other types of Ukrainian folk compositions, and became an author of numerous works inspired by texts of Taras Shevchenko as well as several operas, most notably Natalka Poltavka, Eneida and Taras Bulba. Lysenko's influence on Ukrainian composers during the late 19th and early 20th century was immense, and during that period Ukrainian music experienced an upsurge even despite the bans introduced by the 1876 Ems Ukaz. In 1904, Lysenko opened the Russian Empire's first Ukrainian music school in Kyiv (now the Lysenko State Music and Drama Institute). He is credited with establishing a classical music tradition that was a blend of folk music and classical music forms.

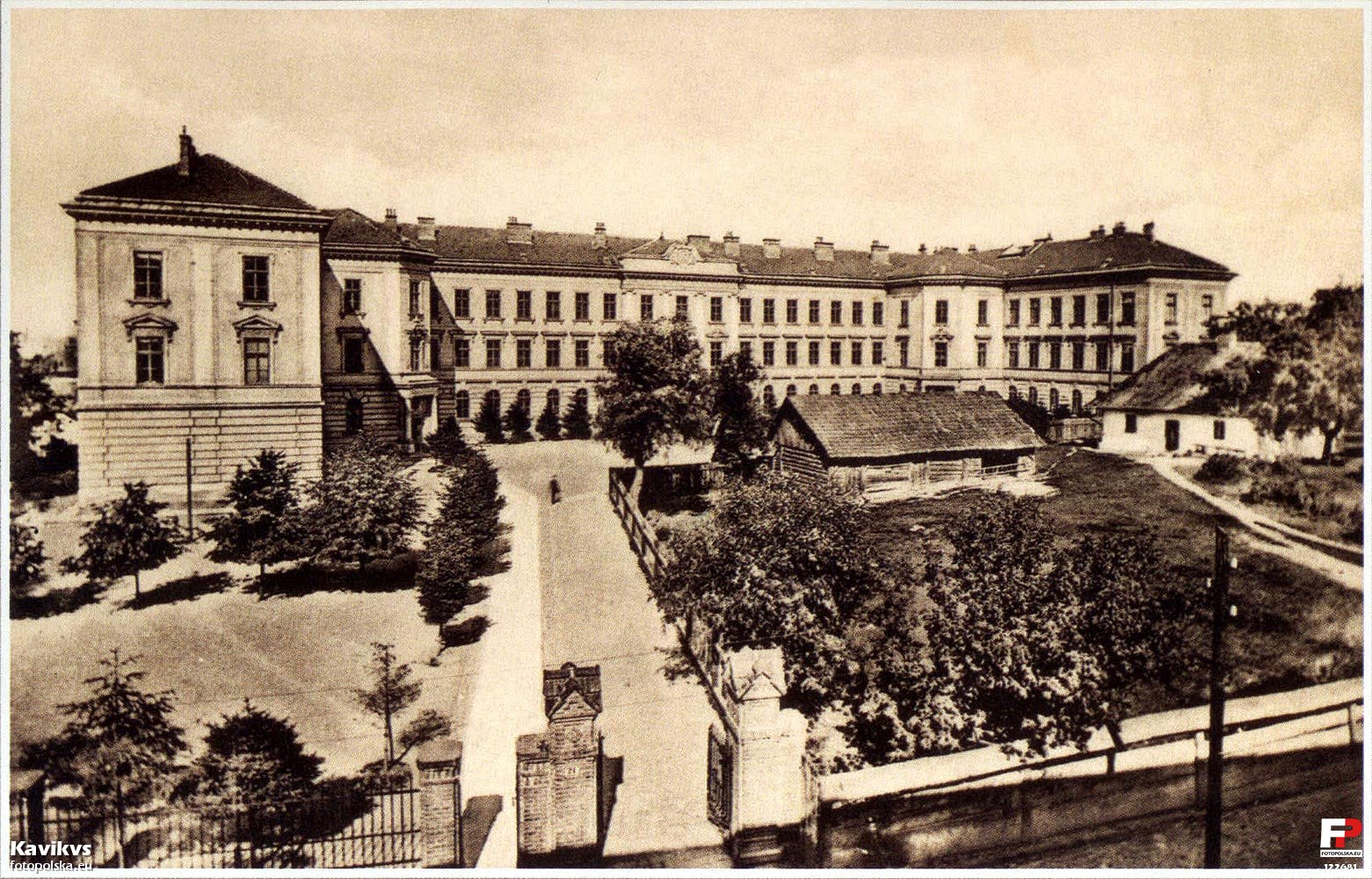
Ukrainian gymnasium in Peremyshl (Przemyśl), where the modern National Anthem of Ukraine was first performed in 1863

==== Ukrainian music in the Habsburg monarchy ====
In Galicia musical life experienced a period of resurgence following the annexation by Austria in 1772. Under the rule of Vienna, Lviv became a place where notable musical figures such as Józef Elsner and Franz Xaver Mozart were active. In 1829 a choir was established in Peremyshl by Greek Catholic bishop Ivan Snihurskyi, turining the city into a centre of musical life in Western Ukraine. Among the alumni of Peremyshl musical school were Mykhailo Verbytskyi (author of music for the National Anthem of Ukraine), Sydir Vorobkevych and Anatole Vakhnianyn. A new direction in Ukrainian music emerged in Western Ukrainian lands during the 1880s, under the influence of Mykola Lysenko's compositions. The most notable representatives of that group were Ostap Nyzhankivskyi, Filaret Kolessa, Denys Sichynskyi and Yaroslav Lopatynskyi (composer).

=== 20th century ===
==== Early 20th-century Ukrainian music ====
Performers of the Ukrainian Republic Capella in 1919

Early 20th century saw a new upsurge in Ukrainian musical development, centered around a group of composers who settled in Kyiv, most notably Kyrylo Stetsenko, Yakiv Stepovyi, Mykola Leontovych, Borys Pidhoretskyi, Pavlo Senytsia and Oleksander Koshyts. Their compositions were characterized by significant influence of folk material and reemergence of church music themes. Composers from that group took part in the development of musical infrastructure of the Ukrainian People's Republic.

In the period of the Ukrainian War of Independence, numerous Ukrainian artistic groups were created, as the new government took a consistent position in the field of cultural development, including music. In particular, by a decree of Pavlo Skoropadsky in 1918, the State Symphony Orchestra of Ukraine, the Ukrainian State Chapel, and the First and Second National Choirs were established. The Kyiv Opera was renamed into the Ukrainian Drama and Opera Theatre, and a number of world-famous operas were translated into Ukrainian. In 1918, the Kobzar Choir was founded, which would later be revived as the State Bandura Chapel. Ukrainian Republic Capella and Lysenko Music and Drama School were also established during that time.

==== Ukrainian music during the interwar period ====
Following the Bolshevik occupation of Ukraine, many prominent figures of Ukrainian music were persecuted or forced to emigrate. In 1921, Mykola Leontovych was murdered by a Cheka agent; the society established in his memory soon afterwards was banned in 1928. During the 1920s, the new generation of composers in Soviet Ukraine was forced to function in the environment of state policies, which promoted the creation of a new culture, national in shape but Bolshevik in its essence. Among their most notable representatives were Levko Revutskyi, Borys Liatoshynskyi, Viktor Kosenko, Valentyn Kostenko, Mykhailo Verykivskyi and Pylyp Kozytskyi. Soviet authorities established a number of musical institutions across Ukraine: choral and symphonic groups, as well as opera and ballet theatres were formed in Kharkiv (1925), Poltava (1928), Vinnytsia (1929), Dnipropetrovsk (1931), and Donetsk (1941). Throughout the 1920s, a number of composers' organizations were established in Ukraine, but in 1932 all of them were united by authorities into the Union of Soviet Musicians of Ukraine, subordinate to the all-union organization. The union was entrusted with ideological control over Ukraine's composers. Despite government pressure, Ukrainian musical creativity during the first decade and a half of Soviet rule continued to develop.

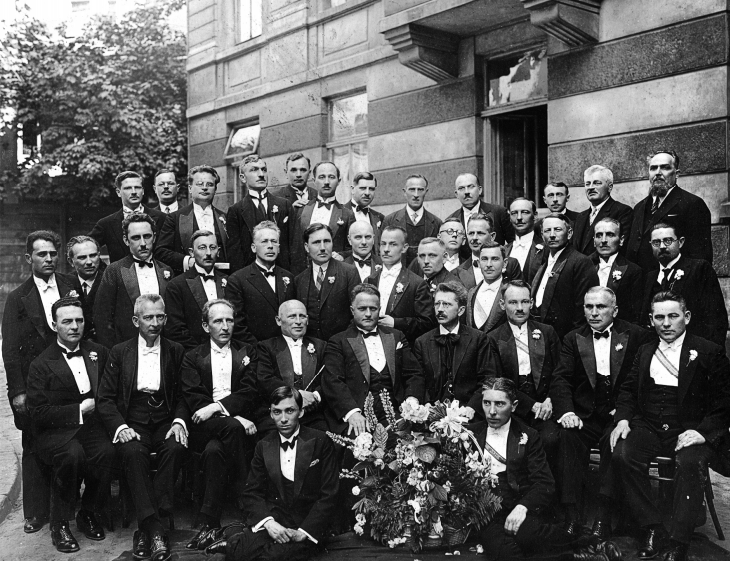
A Ukrainian choir in Lviv, 1930

Starting from the mid-1930s, music in the Soviet Union developed under the pressure of government-imposed aesthetics of socialist realism. Creations of both the new generation Ukrainian composers, represented by names such as Yuliy Meitus, Vsevolod Rybalchenko and Mykhailo Tits, Mykhailo Skorulskyi, Andriy Shtoharenko, Kostiantyn Dankevych and Heorhiy Maiboroda, as well as works by their elder peers, were limited by their subordination to the requirements of Soviet musical style, which was itself based on Russian musical traditions. Despite this, native topics and elements retained their place in music created in Ukraine during that time. Nevertheless, the development of Ukrainian music under the Soviet rule was severely hampered by ideological pressure and bureaucratism.

In comparison to the repressive atmosphere of Soviet Ukraine, Ukrainian music in the Second Polish Republic enjoyed a higher degree of creative freedom. A new generation of Ukrainian composers emerged there under the leadership of Stanislav Liudkevych, Vasyl Barvinskyi, Nestor Nyzhankivskyi, Zynoviy Lysko and Antin Rudnytskyi. In 1934, the Union of Ukrainian Professional Musicians (SUPROM) was established by Ukrainian musical activists under Polish rule.

==== Ukrainian music in the postwar period ====
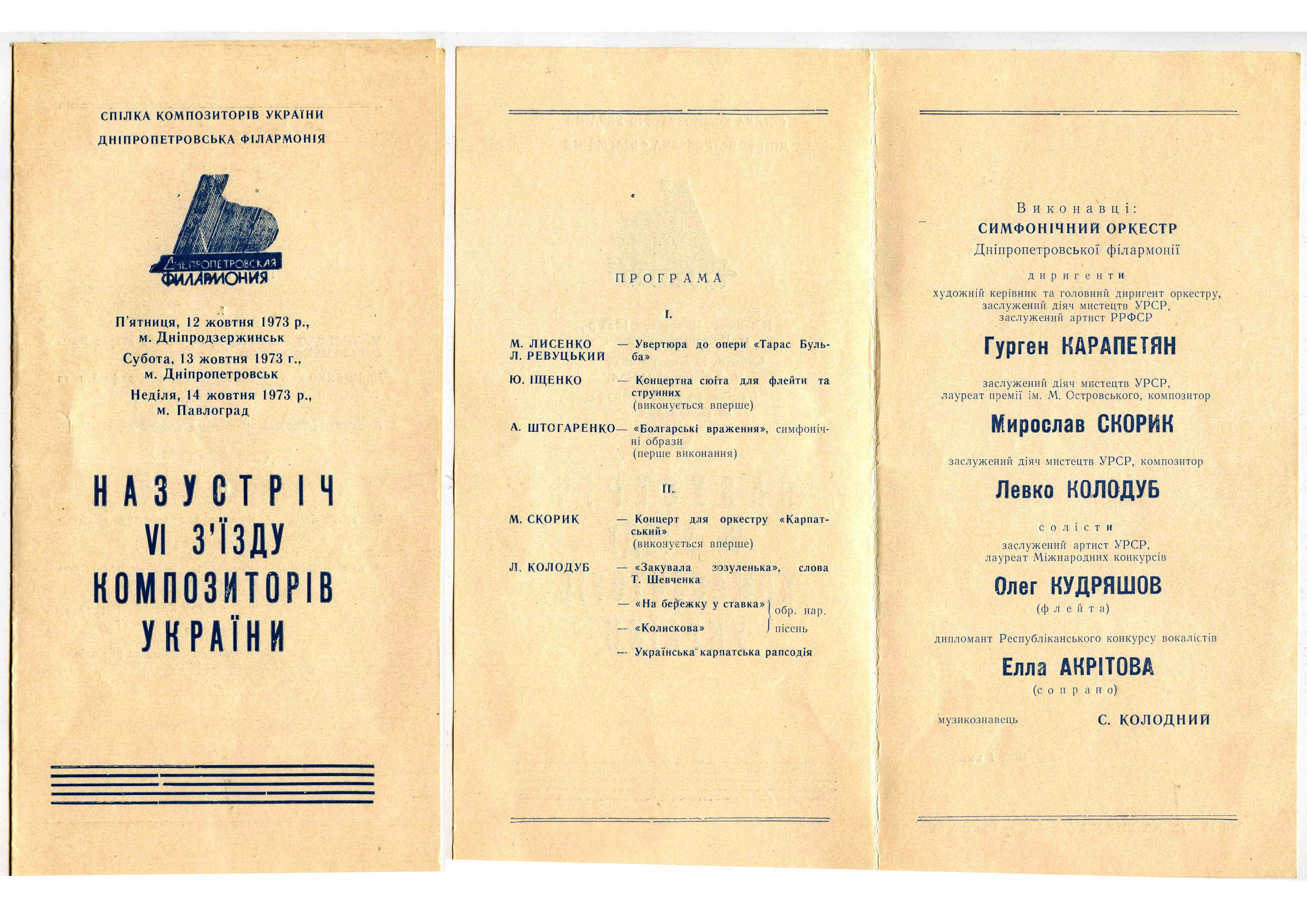
Program leaflet of the 6th Congress of the Union of Composers of Ukraine, 1973

After the Second World War, Soviet authorities continued to promote the cultural isolation of music from modern Western trends, with foreign compositions being criticized as examples of formalism. All attempts to compose outside of party control were suppressed, with some composers being forced to revise their works in order to conform to government requirements. A period of relaxation of such policies took place during the 1960s, leading to the emergence of Kyiv avant-garde - a group of Ukrainian composers represented among others by Leonid Hrabovsky, Valentyn Sylvestrov, Vitaliy Hodziatskyi, Volodymyr Zahortsev and Volodymyr Huba. Led by the conductor Ihor Blazhkov, the group was subjected to oppression by the authorities. They were followed by a new generation of composers who attempted to combine Ukrainian musical tradition with modern trends, including Myroslav Skoryk, Lesia Dychko, Yevhen Stankovych and Ivan Karabyts.

1960s and 1970s saw the emergence of modern Ukrainian popular music, which had its early predecessors in art songs, such as the ones composed by Platon Maiboroda. Stage music, known in Ukraine as estrada, developed under the influence of North American rock and European pop genres, but also frequently included native folk themes. Estrada music achieved prominence not only in the Soviet Union, but also had influence on the Ukrainian diaspora community.

==== Ukrainian music in the diaspora ====
Following both World Wars, a large number of Ukrainian musical activists found themselves in emigration. During the Interwar period, notable Ukrainian composers and performers settled in France, Great Britain, Canada and the United States, including Fedir Yakymenko, Michael Hayvoronsky, Oleksander Koshyts, Roman Prydatkevych and Pavlo Pecheniha-Uhlytskyi. After the Second World War, they were joined by Pavlo Matsenko, Antin Rudnytskyi, Stefania Turkevych-Lukyanovych, Marian Kouzan, Vasyl Yemetz, George Fiala, Volodymyr Hrudyn, Mykola Fomenko, Ihor Sonevytskyi, Lubomyr Melnyk and Virko Baley. In 1946, the Union of Ukrainian Musicians was established in Munich, but only a small number of its members were able to achieve success among the foreign audience.

=== Modern period ===
Violinists of the Lviv Opera chamber orchestra in 2019

After Ukraine gained its independence, composers were once again able to experiment with different musical styles and genres. Festivals of avant-garde music such as Kyiv Music Fest, Kontrasty, and Two Days and Two Nights of New Music were established. In the 2000s, experimental electronic music in Ukraine began to develop. Ukraine's new generation composers include Oleksandr Kozarenko, Volodymyr Runchak, Hanna Havrylets', Alla Zahaikevych, and Ivan Nebesnyy.

Modern Ukrainian musicians and ensembles that are difficult to categorize include the avant-garde and folk singer and composer Mariana Sadovska, the historicist lutenist-composer Roman Turovsky, Dakha Brakha, Dakh Daughters, and the New Era Orchestra.

== Folk music ==
Ukraine's geographical position at the crossroads of Asia and Europe is reflected by the region's folk music, which is a mixture of exotic melismatic singing (the songs include single syllables of text while moving between different successive notes) and harmony which does not always easily fit the harmonic rules of traditional Western European music. The most striking general characteristic of authentic Ukrainian folk music is the common use of minor keys containing augmented seconds, an indication that the tonality system developed in Western European music did not become as entrenched in Ukraine.

Ukrainian folk music rarely uses unusual time signatures, but compound metres are encountered. The music can be harmonically complex.Three- and four-part harmony spread from the central steppe regions of Ukraine, but had become less popular in the mountain regions by the late 19th century.

Ritual songs show the greatest tendency to preservation. They are frequently in recitative style, essentially monodic, based on notes in the range of a third or a fourth. An example of this style is the theme for the Shchedrivka "Shchedryk" known in the West as "Carol of the Bells".

A large group of Ukrainian ritual melodies fall within a perfect fourth with the main central tone as the lowest note. Many of the ritual Easter melodies known as Haivky fall into this category. The tetrachordal system is also found in wedding and harvest songs. Folk dances often have melodies based on two tetrachords fused together. The pentatonic scale in anhemitonic form is common in Vesnianka songs. The bulk of Ukrainian folk songs melodies are based on scales identical to medieval modes, but differ in melodic structure. The Mixolydian and Dorian modes are used more often than Ionian and Aeolian modes. This is a feature of traditional paraliturgical koliadky. The augmented 2nd interval is found, as well as the raising of the fourth and seventh degree of the scale. It is often used for melodic expression. This melodic manner gives an effect that is described as adding severe tension or sadness in some Ukrainian songs. The phenomenon is not found in Russian folk songs and is thought to have been introduced or developed in the 17th century.

=== Vocal folk music ===
There are a number of different variations of Ukrainian folk singing styles:

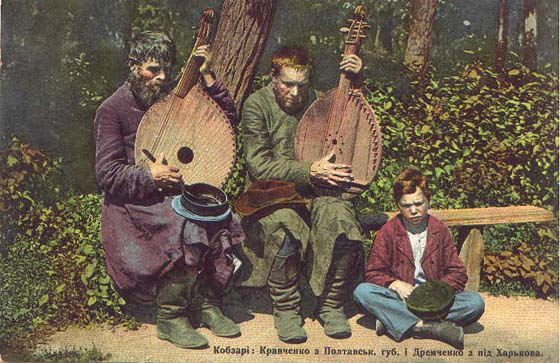
The kobzars Dremchenko and Mykhailo Kravchenko, photographed in 1902

Unaccompanied solo songs were mainly of a ritual type. They included holosinnya that would be sung at a Ukrainian wake. Solo singing with an instrumental accompaniment was performed by a kobzar or a lirnyk, who were professional itinerant musicians. The most highly developed form of this style of singing are dumy folk epics sung to the accompaniment of the bandura, kobza or lira.Their origins stretch back to antiquity, but their repertoire and customs directly date to the 17th century and describe the conflicts between the Cossacks and their foreign oppressors. In many cases the musicians were blind. They organized themselves into regional professional guild-like structures, known as a Kobzars'kyj Tsekh. The Soviets killed almost all of the traditional kobzari during the purges of the 1930s, and their instruments were prohibited.

Under the inspiration of noted traditional bandurist Heorhiy Tkachenko a Kobzar Guild was re-established in 1991 in Kyiv by Mykola Budnyk in order to revive and foster the ancient kobzar traditions. The Guild unites many singer-musicians in Ukraine and the Ukrainian diaspora. Many of its members are not formally Conservatory trained.

Another style of singing involved a type of modal a cappella, in which a musical phrase is sung by a soloist before being answered by the chorus in a harmonic phrase. It is medieval in character, with a distinctly Ukrainian characteristics such as parallel fifths, octaves, and types of plagal cadences. This type of music lost its dominance after 1650 to newer tonal types, but can still be heard in isolated villages. It is evident in koliadky and shchedrivky.

Other vocal styles are more influenced by Western European music, the music of Dimitry of Rostov and his circle in the early 18th century, and urban music.

=== Traditional instruments ===
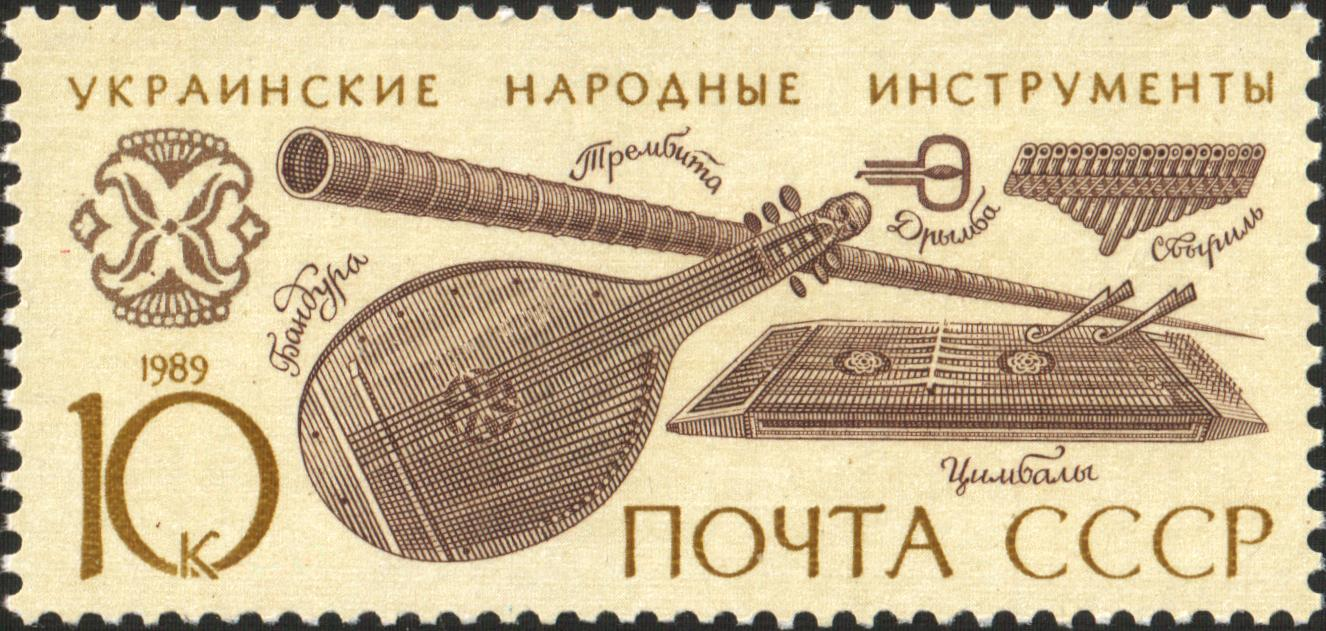
Soviet postage stamp depicting traditional Ukrainian musical instruments

Traditional Ukrainian folklore instruments include: the kobza, bandura, torban, violin, basolia, lyre, cimbalom, sopilka, floyara, trembita, fife, volynka, buben, resheto, and the drymba. Traditional instrumental ensembles are often known as troïstï muzyki (literally ‘three musicians’ that typically make up the ensemble, e.g. violin, sopilka and buben). When performing dance melodies instrumental performance usually includes improvisation.

The traditional dances of Ukraine include: the kozachok, tropak, hopak, hrechanyky, kolomyjka, hutsulka, metelytsia, shumka, arkan, kateryna, and the chabarashka. Dances originating outside the Ukrainian ethnic region but which are also popular include: the polka, mazurka, krakowiak, csárdás, waltz, kamarinskaya, and the barynya. Ukrainian instrumental and dance music influenced Romani and Jewish music; much of it was included in klezmer compositions.

=== Soviet-inspired folk music ===
With the establishment of the Soviet regime in Ukraine in the 1920s, a policy based on state atheism was instituted. This gradually developed into an intolerance towards organized religion, and religious music was purged by the regime. Much classical music was also denounced as being bourgeois and decadent.

During the 1920s, "proletarian songs"—music of the working people—emerged. When it was realised that this music did not cater for the rural population, their songs were included as being of working class origin, and "fakeloric" ensembles were created. After World War II, resources continued to be given to support this style of music, in order to counter the arrival of mass culture from the West.

Numerous folk choirs were established such as the Veriovka folk choir (directed by Hryhoriy Veryovka). A stylized dance troupe was established by Pavlo Virsky based on a synthesis of ethnographic dance and ballet. Particularly popular were the numerous Bandurist Capellas. These particular pseudo-folk forms blended ethnographic materials in an art setting have become popular in the Ukrainian diaspora in North America, where pseudo-folk or "reconstructive" bandurists such as Zinoviy Shtokalko, Hryhoriy Kytasty, Julian Kytasty, and Victor Mishalow have played a role in defining Ukrainian ethnicity in the New World, while fusing traditional musical material with new possibilities offered by contemporary instruments.

=== Music of non-Ukrainian ethnic minorities ===
Jewish music, including Klezmer, cantorial, Yiddish-language folksongs, and Yiddish theatre music, can be traced to the Jewish Pale of Settlement and to south-western Ukraine. It is estimated that at the beginning of the 19th century, a third of the total Jewish population of Europe lived in Ukrainian lands. Russian Empire and Soviet folklorists who collected and documented Jewish music—primarily in Ukraine—included Shloyme Ansky, Susman Kiselgof, Moisei Beregovsky, Joel Engel, and Sofia Magid. Many of their collections are kept in the National Library of Ukraine.

Many of the early performers of Russian folk instruments came from Ukraine, and they sometimes included Ukrainian melodies in their repertoire. The four-string Russian domra is played and taught in Ukraine, even though it has been replaced by the three-string version in Russia.

=== Polyphony Project ===
The Polyphony Project, which is funded in part by the Creative Europe program of the European Union, and which aims to "explore, preserve and present the living musical folklore of Ukrainian villages", has an online archive of Ukrainian folk music.

== Rock and popular music ==
Pop music in Ukraine is influenced by American and British pop music. It has grown in popularity since the 1960s; over the next decade, a number of folk rock groups emerged. Major contributions were made by the songwriters Volodymyr Ivasyuk and Oleksandr Bilash. After Ivasyuk's death in 1979, developments in Ukrainian pop music largely stopped. Even established folk-rock groups such as Kobza began to sing in Russian instead of Ukrainian.

Ukrainian pop music revived in 1990s after Ukraine became independent. The Chervona Ruta Festival played an important role in popularisation and evolution of the Ukrainian pop music. In 2004, Ruslana won the Eurovision Song Contest 2004, Ukraine's first victory in the contest.

Until the Russo-Ukrainian War broke out in 2014, the Russian language was widely used by Ukrainian artists in order to reach audiences outside Ukraine who could understand Russian. Russian-language songs gradually lost popularity in Ukraine after 2014, while Ukrainian-language music experienced a surge; this trend accelerated when the 2022 Russian invasion of Ukraine began in February 2022. Muzvar music journalist Julian Novak stated in July 2022: 'Many popular artists have decided to switch to the Ukrainian language, and change their existing Russian-language repertoire to Ukrainian.' The war became an increasingly prominent theme in songs, with lyrics about consolation in trying times of losing loved ones and having to flee one's home and country, but also the courage to go on. New musical tracks from Ukraine also incorporated ever more elements of Ukrainian folklore, such as the remake of a traditional lullaby by Eurovision Song Contest 2022 winner "Stefania", and the use of the traditional flute.

Ukraine's contemporary jazz scene also gained international visibility in this period: the Kyiv fusion band Hyphen Dash, for example, was profiled by Rolling Stone for its 2025 album Basement 626, recorded in a basement about 15 kilometres from the front line.

In 2026, the Verkhovna Rada established Ukrainian Music Day, a national commemorative day observed annually on the third Saturday of September. The initiative aims to promote Ukrainian musical heritage, performers, composers, and the contemporary music industry. The date was selected in reference to the 1989 Chervona Ruta festival, which is regarded as a milestone in the development of modern Ukrainian popular music.

== Classical compositions with a Ukrainian connection ==
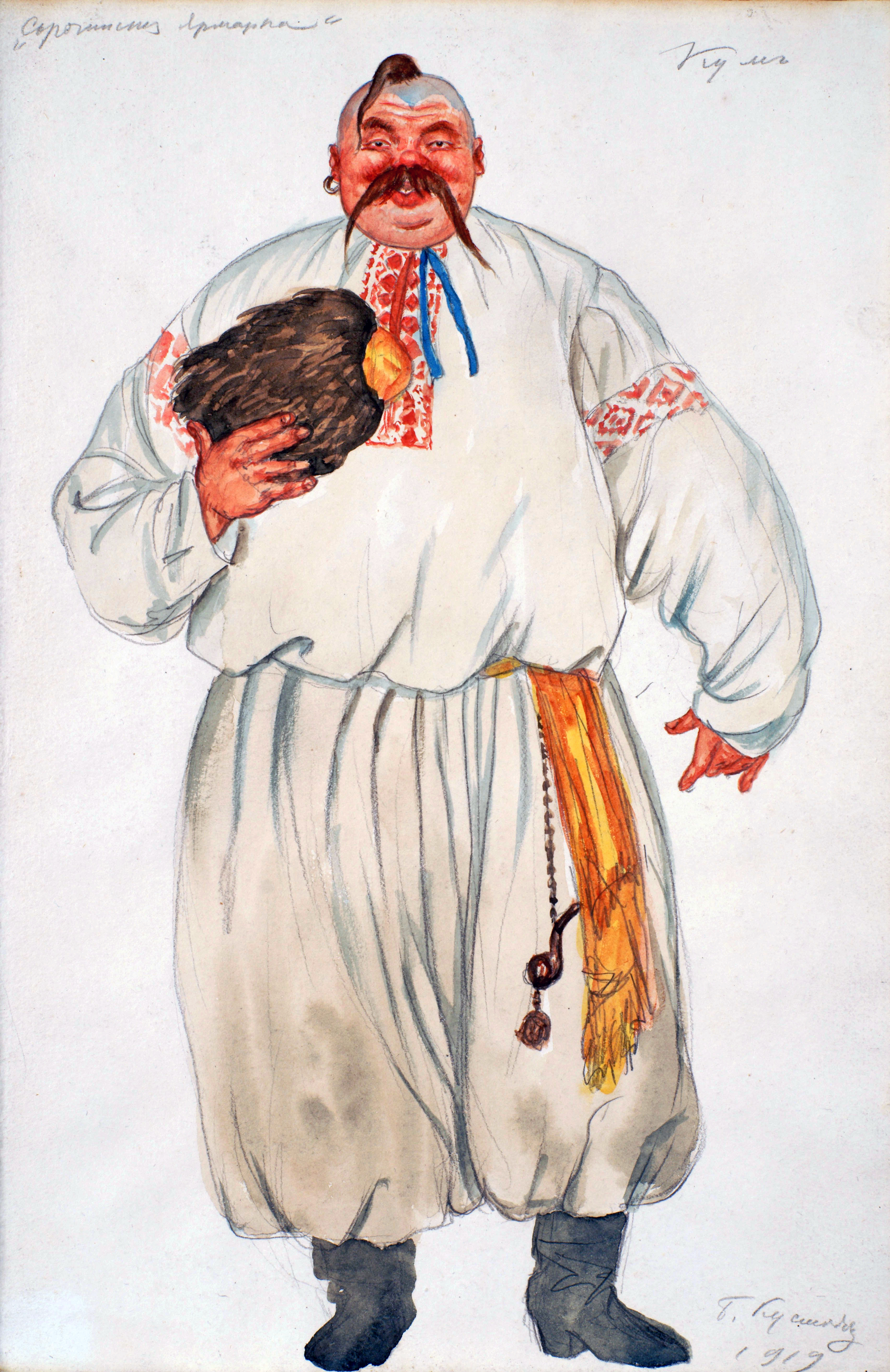
Kum from The Fair at Sorochyntsi by Mussorgsky

- Beethoven – Razumovsky Quartets, Opus 59 No. 1-3, Air de la Petite Russe
- Alexander Dargomyzhsky – Kozachok (1864)
- Dvořák – Dumky Trio
- Glazunov – Hopak
- Reinhold Gliere – ballet Taras Bulba
- Glinka – romances "Don't chirp the nightingale" and "The wind is blowing loudly in the field" use lyrics by the Ukrainian Romantic poet Viktor Zabila
- Haydn – String quartet no. 20. op. 9 no. 2
- Johann Nepomuk Hummel – Trio op. 78
- Vanessa Lann – Two Ukrainian Folk Sketches for B-flat clarinet and piano
- Dmitri Kabalevsky – A Ukrainian folk tune is incorporated into the Violin Concerto (1948)
- Liszt – Mazeppa (1854); the symphonic poem Ballade d'Ukraine is based on a poem by Victor Hugo.
- Modest Mussorgsky – unfinished opera The Fair at Sorochyntsi, based on Nikolai Gogol's story. Act 1 has a song based on a Ukrainian tune.
- Quincy Porter – Ukrainian Suite (1925) for string orchestra
- Prokofieff – opera Semyon Kotko (1939), set in Ukraine in 1918.
- Rachmaninoff – the opening of the Piano Concerto No 3 (1909) is based on a Ukrainian Orthodox church chant.
- Tchaikovsky – Symphony No. 2 ('Little Russian') (1872); opera Mazepa is set in Ukraine. The main theme of the first movement of the Piano Concerto No. 1
- Weber – Nine Variations on Schöne Minka, op. 40 (1815)

== See also ==
- Preservation of kobzar music
- List of Ukrainian composers (alphabetical)

== Sources ==
- Helbig, Adriana; Buranbaeva, Oksana; Vanja, Mladineo (2009). "Music". Culture and Customs of Ukraine. Westport, Connecticut: Greenwood Press. ISBN 978-03133-4-363-6 – via Internet Archive.
- Hinson, Maurice; Roberts, Wesley (2013). Guide to the Pianist's Repertoire (4th ed.). Bloomington, Indiana: Indiana University Press. ISBN 978-02530-1-023-0.
- Holden, Anthony (1995). Tchaikovsky: A Biography. New York: Random House. ISBN 978-01401-7-225-6.
- Tawa, Nicholas E. (2001). From Psalm to Symphony A History of Music in New England. Lebanon, New Hampshire: Northeastern University Press. ISBN 978-15555-3-491-2.
- Walker, Alan (1970). Franz Liszt: the man and his music. New York: Taplinger. ISBN 978-08008-2-990-2.
