= Timofiy Bilohradsky =

Ukrainian composer

Timofiy Bilohradsky Тимофій Білоградський
- Born: c. 1710; Cherkasy, Cossack Hetmanate (present-day Ukraine)
- Died: c. 1782 (aged 71–72) Saint Petersburg, Tsardom of Russia
- Genres: Classical
- Occupations: Composer, musician
- Instruments: lute; kobza; bandura

Timofiy Bilohradsky (Ukrainian: Тимофій Білоградський), also given as Belogradsky, or Pelogradsky (c. 1710 – c. 1782) was a lutenist, composer and kobzar-bandurist of Ukrainian ethnicity. He was active in St. Petersburg and Königsberg.

== Life ==
Little is known about Bilohradsky's childhood. He is thought to have been born in or near the city of Cherkasy (now in Ukraine) and that he learned to play the kobza and the lute at the Hlukhiv Music Academy. He is said to have had an excellent singing voice and great musical aptitude. In 1725 he was invited to St Petersburg to sing in the Imperial Church Capella. In 1733 Tsarina Anna sent Bilohradsky to Dresden in the retinue of the ambassador, Hermann Karl von Keyserling. In Dresden, Bilohradsky was able to perfect his lute playing under the tutelage of Silvius Leopold Weiss - the most important lutenist-composer of the 18th century. He also studied voice with Faustina Bordoni-Hasse, and castrato Domenico Annibali. Bilohradsky became one of the highest trained musicians in the Russian Court Capella.

In 1739, Bilohradsky returned to St Petersburg, where he continued to work as a court musician. In 1741 he returned to Germany where he became known as a virtuoso lutenist and singer and for some time lived in Königsberg where he had a number of students - notably Johann Reichardt (father of Johann Friedrich Reichardt), and Johann Georg Hamann, the Sturm-und-Drang philosopher.

In his last years he lived in Petersburg. The "Moscow Weiss Manuscript" is ascribed to Bilohradsky or his circle. As a composer Bilohradsky is known for a set of songs and romances to the texts by Sumarokov that enjoyed considerable popularity in the 18th century.

His niece, Yelizaveta Belogradskaya, became famous as a first Russian opera-singer, she sang at the Imperial St. Petersburg opera and was also known as a composer.
