= Jerzy Czarnecki =

Holocaust survivor and nuclear engineer

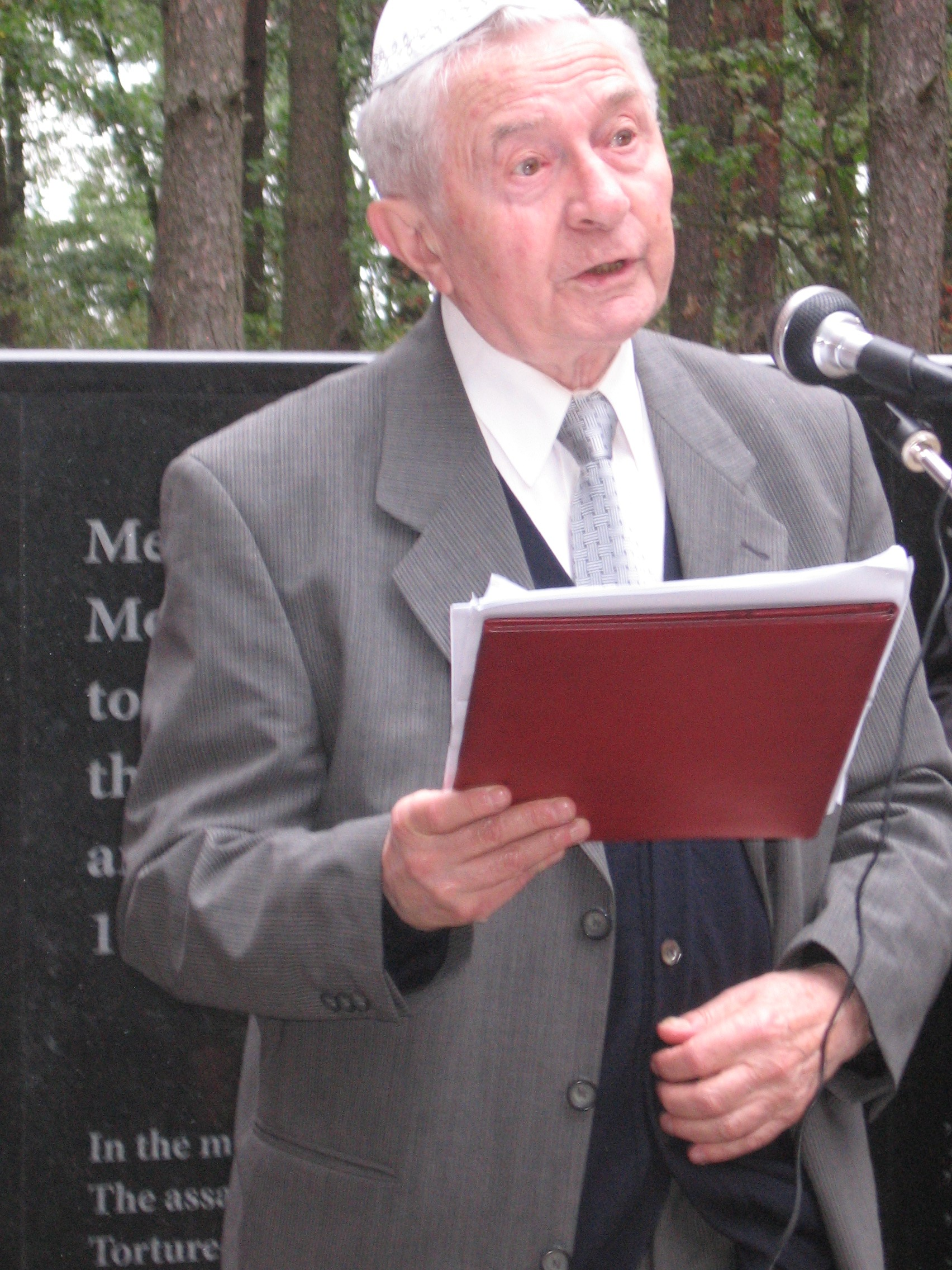
- Jerzy Czarnecki (2006)
- Born: Isaac Steger; 20 November 1924; Mosty Wielkie, Poland
- Died: 2 December 2007 (aged 83); Zürich, Switzerland

Jerzy Czarnecki (20 November 1924 – 2 December 2007) was a Polish Jewish Holocaust survivor who became a nuclear engineer, expert in nuclear power stations and nuclear pollution control. In Poland, he was employed at WAT (Technical Military Academy in Warsaw) as professional officer till 1968; in Switzerland, he worked at the Hauptabteilung für die Sicherheit der Kernanlagen (HSK – Swiss Federal Nuclear Safety Inspectorate). In the last years of his life, he engaged in reviving the memory of Shoah, in Ukraine and in Switzerland, and a movie was made on his life and perpetuation activities.

== Early life in Poland ==
Jerzy Czarnecki (nicknamed "Yurek" or “Jurek”) was born in the Polish township Mosty Wiekie (currently Ukraine: Velyki Mosty) as Isaac Steger. His education at the gymnasium in Zhovkva was interrupted with the West Ukraine's conquest by Nazi Germany. In 1942, he fled from Mosty Wielkie, coming to Warsaw. He was then brought to Stralsund where he worked as forced laborer. After the end of the war, he enrolled in Polish army and studied engineering at Leningrad and Warsaw Universities, up to doctoral degree, specializing in nuclear pollution control. He worked at WAT as professional officer (Lieutenant colonel) and reader, also developing patents, until he had to quit the position in the aftermath of the 1968-anti-semitic wave.

== Years in Switzerland ==
Czarnecki obtained asylum in Switzerland in 1972. Two years later he was appointed at the HSK- Swiss Federal Nuclear Safety Inspectorate, at the section of radio-logical surveillance, remaining there till his retirement, in 1989. At the HSK, his major task was to refine measurement techniques of nuclear air pollution. His research was published in several journals, including Health Physics in 1983.

After his retirement, Czarnecki acted as nuclear expert, travelling on several special missions to Ukraine, in the aftermath of the Chernobyl nuclear reactor explosion. In the year 2002, he published his life-memoires under the title “Mein Leben als ‘Arier’. Jüdische Familiengeschichte in Polen zur Zeit der Schoáh und als Zwangsarbeiter in Deutschland”. This book was translated into English and appeared in 2007 under the title: “My Life as an ‘Aryan’: From Velyki Mosty through Zhovkva to Stralsund”, and was endorsed by Yad Vashem.

== Reviving Jewish history ==
Czarnecki's remaining years were dedicated to reviving the Jewish past in Velyki Mosty, and in Switzerland. His and his family's attempts to clean the ruin of the synagogue and to erect a monument to commemorate the killing of 1500 Jews in the local “Babki” forest were supported by the municipality and by local population. The monument was inaugurated on October, 8th, 2006. In 2006, Czarnecki was granted an Honorary Citizenship by the Velyki Mosty City Council.

Czarnecki died in Zürich in December 2007.

== Personal life ==
Jerzy Czarnecki married Janina Pyzuk in 1954; in 1956 his daughter Joanna Pfaff-Czarnecka was born.

== ‘My Life as an ‘Aryan” ==
Czarnecki's book documents his dramatic life story as an Eastern European Jew against the backdrop of violent European history. It describes the often precarious coexistence between the Jews, Poles and Ukrainians in the region of Lviv, before the World War II, and the increasing cruelty towards the Jews under the Nazis, resulting in the death of almost the entire Jewish population of Mosty Wielkie and of the entire region. The book also depicts Czarnecki's escape from his native West-Ukraine and his struggle for survival till 1945.

Important passages of the book also describe the bravery of Polish activists and families who came to the rescue of Czarnecki and his relatives. He appealed to Yad Vashem to have Wladyslawa and Waclaw Rybak as well as Jozefa Paluch recognised as 'The Righteous among the Nations' by Yad Vashem. The English edition documents this title as being conferred to Zofia and Jozef Piotrowski who saved Jerzy's mothernal Aunt hela Graubart and her husband Aharon.

== ‘From Galicia to Aargau’ ==
In 2005, Czarnecki became the protagonist of Susy and Peter Scheiner's film “From Galicia to Aargau: Trails of a Jewish European in the 20th century“. The main part of the film is Jerzy Czarnecki's journey to Mosty Wielkie that he undertakes for the first time after more than 60 years, after his escape. It shows that this township barely remembers its Jewish past. At the same time, Czarnecki is welcomed by the local people, most of whom never met a Jew. The movie follows Czarnecki's efforts to erect the monument in memory of the Jews of the town and also shows the desecration of it by unknown villains.

== Reactions to the book and movie ==
The book was widely received. The renown newspaper 'Neue Zürcher Zeitung' invited Czarnecki to provide a full page text for its Saturday-edition (Zeitfragen). Jerzy Czarnecki was repeatedly invited to schools, churches and civil society fora to speak on his Holocaust experience. The Foreign Ministry of the Swiss government (EDA) supported his activities of commemoration, including co-sponsoring the screening of Susy and Peter Scheiner's film in Welykie Mosty. The film was shown at several film festivals and received a number of endorsements.
