= Fedir Yakymenko =

Ukrainian composer, pianist, teacher

Fedir Stepanovych Yakymenko (Ukrainian: Федір Степанович Якименко; 8 February 1876 – 3 January 1945) was a Ukrainian composer, pianist, and teacher.

== Early life ==
Yakymenko was born in the village of Pisky, Kharkov Governorate, Russian Empire. His father was a church cantor, and he and his two brothers grew up in a musical environment. His brother Yakiv Stepovy also became a composer.

== Education ==
At 10 years old, Yakymenko was selected to join the St. Petersburg State Academic Capella where he studied under Anatoly Lyadov and Mily Balakirev and completed a course in the theory of composition, taught by Nikolai Rimsky-Korsakov. He graduated from the Saint Petersburg Conservatory in 1900.

== Career ==
In 1897, Yakymenko began to work as a teacher on the conducting courses at the St. Petersburg State Academic Capella. In 1901-02 he briefly taught music theory to Igor Stravinsky. Subsequently, he was conductor of the music school in Tbilisi (1901-1903) and then became director of the music school in Nice (1903-1906).

In 1912, Yakymenko moved to Moscow, where he performed as pianist and as conductor at concerts organised by Serge Koussevitzky.

Two years later, Yakymenko returned to Saint Petersburg. In 1917, he became a member of the Ukrainian Literary and Artistic Society in Petrograd. He became a Professor at the Saint Petersburg Conservatory in 1919, teaching composition and music theory, and continued there until 1923. He also contributed to the Russian Musical Gazette.

Yakymenko became director of the Kharkov branch of the Russian Musical Society. After a short stay in Kharkiv, teaching at the Kharkiv Music College, in 1924 he worked for some time as a professor of music at the Ukrainian Drahomanov Higher Pedagogical Institute in Prague as head and professor of the music department. Among his students were Zynoviy Lysko and Mykola Kolessa. In addition to teaching, Yakymenko performed as a concert pianist and choir conductor, actively involved and performing in the Ukrainian diaspora's musical life. Yakymenko's musical output during this time was very connected to Ukraine, including arrangements of folk songs and other pieces dedicated to Ukraine.

From 1928, Yakymenko lived in France, initially settling in Nice and then in Paris. In 1932 Yakymenko was made vice-director of the Russian Conservatory, founded by Yevgeny Gunst in Paris. Financial hardship linked to the rise of Nazism, economic crisis, and World War II led to the closure of the conservatory, and Yakymenko was left without employment. Publishers who had previously printed his works also ceased operation.

== Personal life ==
During his years teaching and living in Europe, Yakymenko immersed himself in artistic circles, inspired by Debussy and Ravel, becoming acquainted with Alexander Scriabin and Michel-Dimitri Calvocoressi, performing as a pianist, and composing his own works.

Yakymenko supported the Ukrainian liberation movement and Ukrainian nation-building, was very involved in Ukrainian diaspora during his time abroad, and his work has many references to and themes from Ukrainian culture.

Yakymeko spent his final years in Paris, where he died suddenly on January 3, 1945. He was buried at the Batignolles Cemetery. His gravestone reads "Fedir Yakymenko — Ukrainian composer.".

== Musical style ==
Yakymenko's compositions can be described as modernist or neo-romantic, with influences from symbolism, impressionism, cosmogony, and mysticism. Yakymenko's works have been described as "refined" and "poetic", with "French influences that combine with Ukrainian musical language".

Yakymenko was also inspired by astronomy, and in 1904 he became a member of the French Astronomical Society.
