= Kyiv Chamber Orchestra =

Orchestra in Ukraine

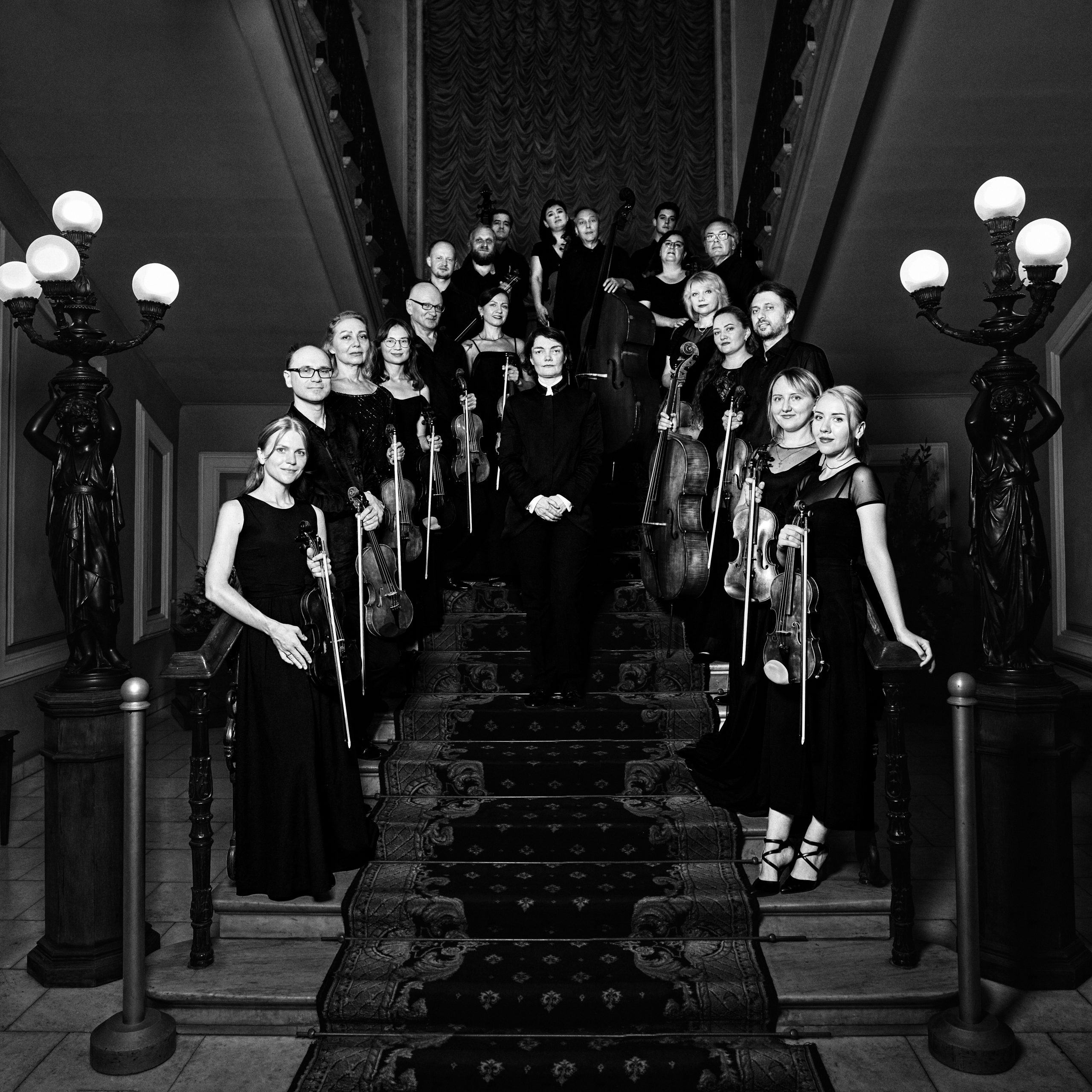
Kyiv Chamber Orchestra

The Kyiv Chamber Orchestra was founded in 1963 by the distinguished musician Anton Sharoev. The orchestra’s musicians are virtuoso performers known for exceptional artistry and technical mastery.

== History ==
Since 1990, the orchestra's principal conductor and artistic director was Roman Kofman, until his death in 2026. The orchestra has made many recordings and appears frequently on radio and television. The orchestra specializes in both classical and contemporary works. Soloists who have performed with the orchestra include Gidon Kremer, Stephen Isserlis, Liana Isakadze, Andrej Hoteev, Natalia Gutman, Eliso Virsaladze, Vladymyr Krainev, Alexei Lyubimov, Boris Pergamenchikov, Mischa Maisky, Ivan Monigheti, Lucia Aliberti, Viktoria Lukyanets, and Oleksandr Semchuk.

During the Concert Season 2009–2010, the Kyiv Chamber Orchestra under the baton of Roman Kofman performed all of the symphonies of Mozart in the Lysenko Concert Hall of the National Philharmonic of Ukraine.

The Kyiv Chamber Orchestra actively promotes the music of Ukrainian composers in Ukraine and abroad. Its repertoire includes works by Valentyn Bibik, Yevhen Stankovych, Myroslav Skoryk, Valentyn Sylvestrov, Levko Kolodub, Vitalii Hubarenko, Leonid Hrabovsky, Volodymyr Zahortsev, Victoria Poleva, Volodymyr Runchak, Yurii Laniuk, Oleksandr Shchetynsky, Alla Zahaikevytch, Sviatoslav Luniov, and others.

Since 2019, the Kyiv Chamber Orchestra has been led by the internationally acclaimed conductor Natalia Ponomarchuk. As one of Ukraine’s most sought-after conductors, she enriches the orchestra’s repertoire with classical and contemporary works, supports experimental projects by young composers, and promotes the finest examples of musical heritage.

== Principal conductors ==
- Anton Sharoyev (1963–1969)
- Ihor Blazhkov (1969–1976)
- Anton Sharoyev (1976–1987)
- Arkady Vynokurov (1987–1991)
- Roman Kofman (1991–2016)
- Mykola Diadiura (2016–2019)
- Natalia Ponomarchuk (since 2019)
