= Hlukhiv Musical School =

Hlukhiv Musical and Singing School (Ukrainian: Глухівська музично-співацька школа) was an 18th-century eductional establishment created on the initiative of hetman Danylo Apostol in Hlukhiv, Cossack Hetmanate (now Ukraine). The school played a major role in the development of music in Ukraine and other parts of the Russian Empire.

== History ==
On 18 March 1729 hetman Danylo Apostol sent an appeal to the Collegium of Foreign Affairs in Saint Petersburg, asking Russian authorities for permission to gather adults and youths in all regiments of the Hetmanate in order to provide them with musical education. The best pupils would be then sent to the Saint Petersburg Court Chapel. On 24 August 1730 the General Military Chancellery received an order from the Collegium of Foreign Affairs, according to which a music school was to be established in Hlukhiv. Among the school's pupils were members of church choirs from the regions of Chernihiv, Kyiv and Pereyaslav, including children of Cossacks and burghers from Nizhyn and Chernihiv Regiments, whose parents were freed from taxation and quartering of soldiers. Already in January 1730 the first 11 pupils were sent to Moscow after having been educated by local teachers, including the burgomaster of Hlukhiv, himself a connoisseur of music. In 1732 the school produced its first cantors.

Under the hetmanship of Kyrylo Rozumovsky, Hlukhiv received its own orchestra and theatre known for productions of Italian operas. A large influence upon the school during that time was exerted by the activities of the hetman's chapelmaster Andriy Rachynsky.

== Activities ==
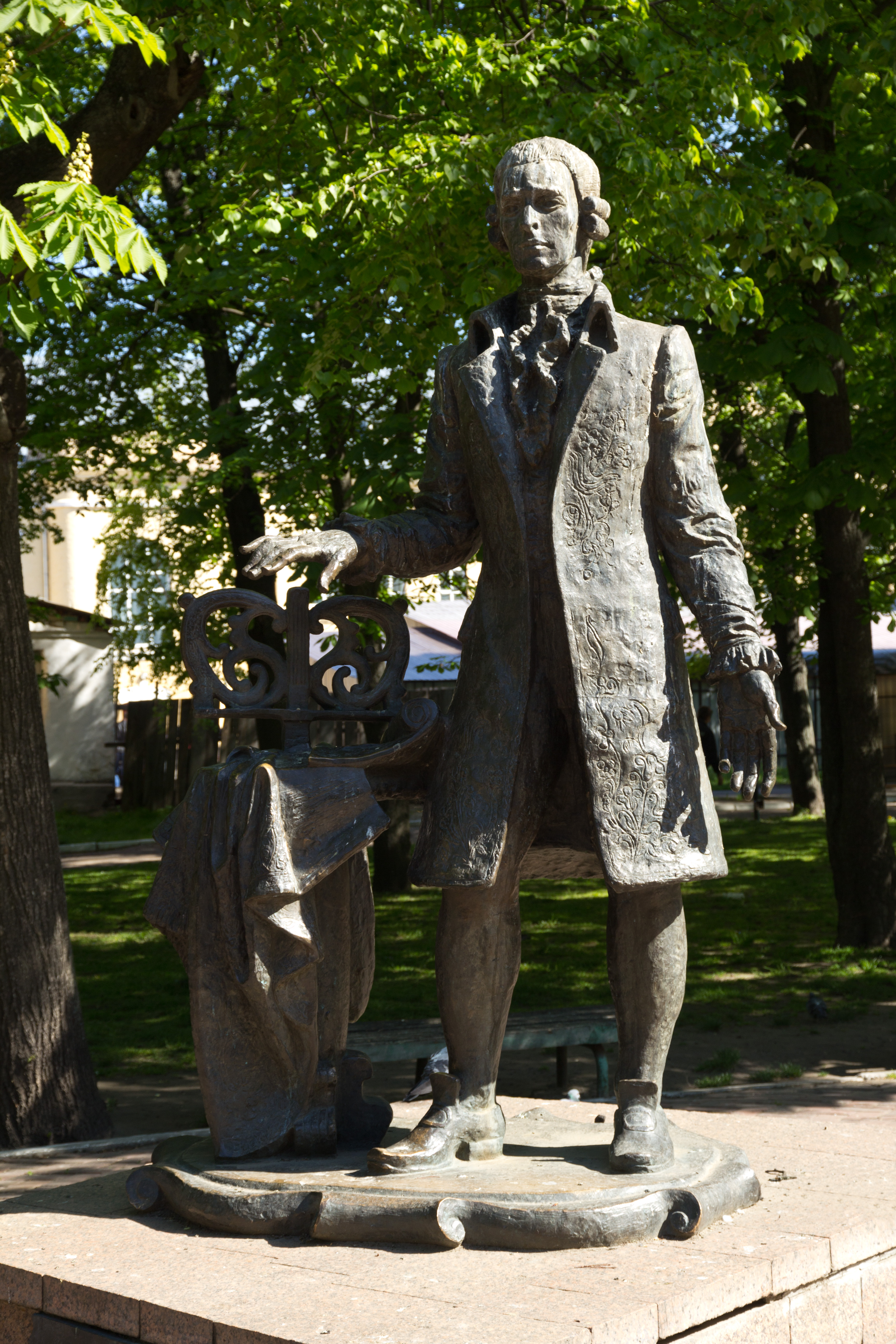
Monument to Dmytro Bortniansky in Hlukhiv

The school's regulations defined its subjects to be four-voice choral song, part song and Kievan chant, as well as lessons of violin, gusli and bandura. Later, dance was also added to the curriculum. The list of teachers included a regent and two instrumentalists. The school was based in a separate building ("singing palace") equipped with a bakery and a dining hall. Pupils and teachers were provided shoes, clothing, food and payment financed from local taxes. The term of studies comprised 2 years, with 20 to 30 pupils studying at the establishment at one time. Ten best pupils of the school would be annually sent to the tsar's court in Saint Petersburg, where they performed in the royal choir and orchestra. The school's pupils would also take part in the local cultural life in Hlukhiv, performing in the choir of Saint Nicholas Church, Hlukhiv, taking part in concerts, theatrical plays and other eventswhich took place at the hetman's residence.

== Legacy ==
In 40 years of its existence, Hlukhiv Musical School produced over 300 pupils, who established the base of Saint Petersburg Court Chapel, but many of its alumni were also active in other cities, including Kyiv, Chernihiv and Moscow. The school's activities contributed to the intense development of religious music in Ukraine. Among its notable pupils were composers Dmytro Bortniansky and Maksym Berezovsky. According to some information, Hryhoriy Skovoroda also studied at the establishment.
