= Kyiv avant-garde =

The Kyiv avant-garde (Ukrainian: Київський авангард, romanized: Kyivskyy avanhard) was an informal group of avant-garde composers that was formed in Kyiv before 1965.

The composers of the group studied the works of Stravinsky, Bartók, composers of the Second Viennese School (Schoenberg, Webern, Berg), as well as Edgard Varèse, Cage, Xenakis, Luciano Berio, Witold Lutosławski and other post-serial avant-garde composers (including Polish ones). Due to the divergence from the retrograde tendencies of the official musical circles of the USSR, members of the "Kyiv avant-garde" were subjected to various kinds of oppression. In 1970, V. Silvestrov, V. Godziatsky, L. Grabovsky, V. Guba were expelled from the Union of Composers of the Ukrainian SSR. Soon the group disbanded, and the members of the Kyiv Avant-Garde, expelled from the union, were reinstated only three years later, after they, in search of protection, wrote a letter to the Lenin Prize laureates - Shostakovich, Kara Karaev and Khachaturyan. According to Valentyn Silvestrov, expulsion from the union "could be compared to strangulation."

Members of the Kyiv Avant-Garde group in the early 60s were:

- Ihor Blazhkov (composer)
- Leonid Hrabovsky
- Valentyn Silvestrov
- Vitaliy Hodziatsky
- Volodymyr Huba
- Volodymyr Zahortsev
- Petro Solovkin
- Vitaliy Patsera

A little later, they were joined by:

- Ivan Karabyts
- Yevhen Stankovych
- Oleh Kiva
- Svyatoslav Krutykov
