= Roman Kofman =

Ukrainian conductor and composer (1936–2026)

- Роман Кофман
- Born: 15 June 1936; Kyiv, Ukrainian SSR, Soviet Union
- Died: 24 February 2026 (aged 89); Israel
- Occupations: Conductor; Violinist; Composer; Music educator
- Organizations: Kyiv Chamber Orchestra; Kyiv Conservatory; Beethoven Orchester Bonn
- Awards: People's Artist of Ukraine; Order of Merit of the Federal Republic of Germany

Roman (Avraham) Isaakovych Kofman (Ukrainian: Роман (Аврaам) Ісаaкович Кофман, 15 June 1936 – 24 February 2026) was a Ukrainian conductor, violinist, composer, music educator and People's Artist of Ukraine (2003). He was internationally known as concertmaster, co-founder and later artistic director of the Kyiv Chamber Orchestra, and as Generalmusikdirektor of the Beethoven Orchester Bonn from 2003 to 2008, when he was awarded the Order of Merit of the Federal Republic of Germany. He was principal conductor of the National Philharmonic of Ukraine from 2012.

== Life and career ==
Roman (Avraham) Isaakovych Kofman was born on 15 June 1936 in Kyiv, Ukrainian SSR. He graduated from the State Conservatory (now the Ukrainian National Academy of Music) with a degree in violin, and a degree in conducting. He soon worked also in the Soviet Union and especially regularly at the Warsaw Opera, but was restricted from work in Western countries from 1973 to 1989. From 1963, he worked as a concertmaster of the Kyiv Chamber Orchestra that he co-founded.

As a conductor, he performed with more than 70 orchestras and ensembles from around the world, in Italy, Austria, Canada, Mexico, the Netherlands, and the United States. He conducted the WDR Symphony Orchestra Cologne, the Bern Symphony Orchestra, orchestra of the Bayerischer Rundfunk, and the Munich Philharmonic.

Between 2003 and 2008, Kofman worked in Germany as the Generalmusikdirektor in Bonn, leading the Beethoven Orchester Bonn and the Bonn Opera, in his first season there conducting Alban Berg's Lulu and Verdi's Macbeth. He programmed all of the Shostakovich symphonies during his tenure.

Kofman was the principal conductor of the Kyiv Chamber Orchestra from 1990 until his death in 2026. He led the symphony orchestra of the National Philharmonic of Ukraine from 2012. Kofman also composed film music. In 2011, he published a literary book containing two short autobiographical novels.

Kofman died on 24 February 2026, at the age of 89.

== Awards ==
Kofman was awarded the titles of Merited Artist of Ukraine and People's Artist of Ukraine. He was also awarded the Officer’s Cross First Class of the Order of Merit of the Federal Republic of Germany. He received the Echo Klassik award in 2007, and in 2011 was shortlisted for the Shevchenko National Prize.
