= Velyki Mosty urban hromada =

Hromada in Lviv Oblast, Ukraine

Velyki Mosty urban hromada Великомостівська міська громада
- Hromada
- Interactive map of Velyki Mosty urban hromada
- Country: Ukraine
- Oblast: Lviv Oblast
- Raion: Sheptytskyi Raion
- Admin. center: Velyki Mosty

Area
  - Total: 6,837 km^{2} (2,640 sq mi)

Population (2021)
  - Total: 52,574
  - Density: 7.690/km^{2} (19.92/sq mi)
- CATOTTG code: UA46120030000069375
- Settlements: 17
- Cities: 1
- Villages: 16
- Website: vmgromada.gov.ua

Velyki Mosty urban hromada (Ukrainian: Великомостівська міська громада) is a hromada in Ukraine, in Sheptytskyi Raion of Lviv Oblast. The administrative center is the city of Velyki Mosty.

== Settlements ==
The hromada consists of 1 city (Velyki Mosty) and 16 villages:

- Borove
- Boianets
- Butyny
- Veryny
- Volytsia
- Dvirtsi
- Zarika
- Kulychkiv
- Kupychvolia
- Lisove
- Piddovhe
- Pidrika
- Prystan
- Reklynets
- Stremin
- Shyshaky
