= Bulgarian Empire =

Bulgarian Empire may refer to:

== Medieval ==
- First Bulgarian Empire, medieval Bulgarian state that existed from 681 to 1018
- Second Bulgarian Empire, medieval Bulgarian state that existed from 1185 to 1396

== Modern ==
- Third Bulgarian Tsardom, the state of Bulgaria from 1908 to 1946

== See also ==
- Bulgarian Tsardom
- Bulgarians
