= Domenico Annibali =

Italian castrato (c. 1705–1779

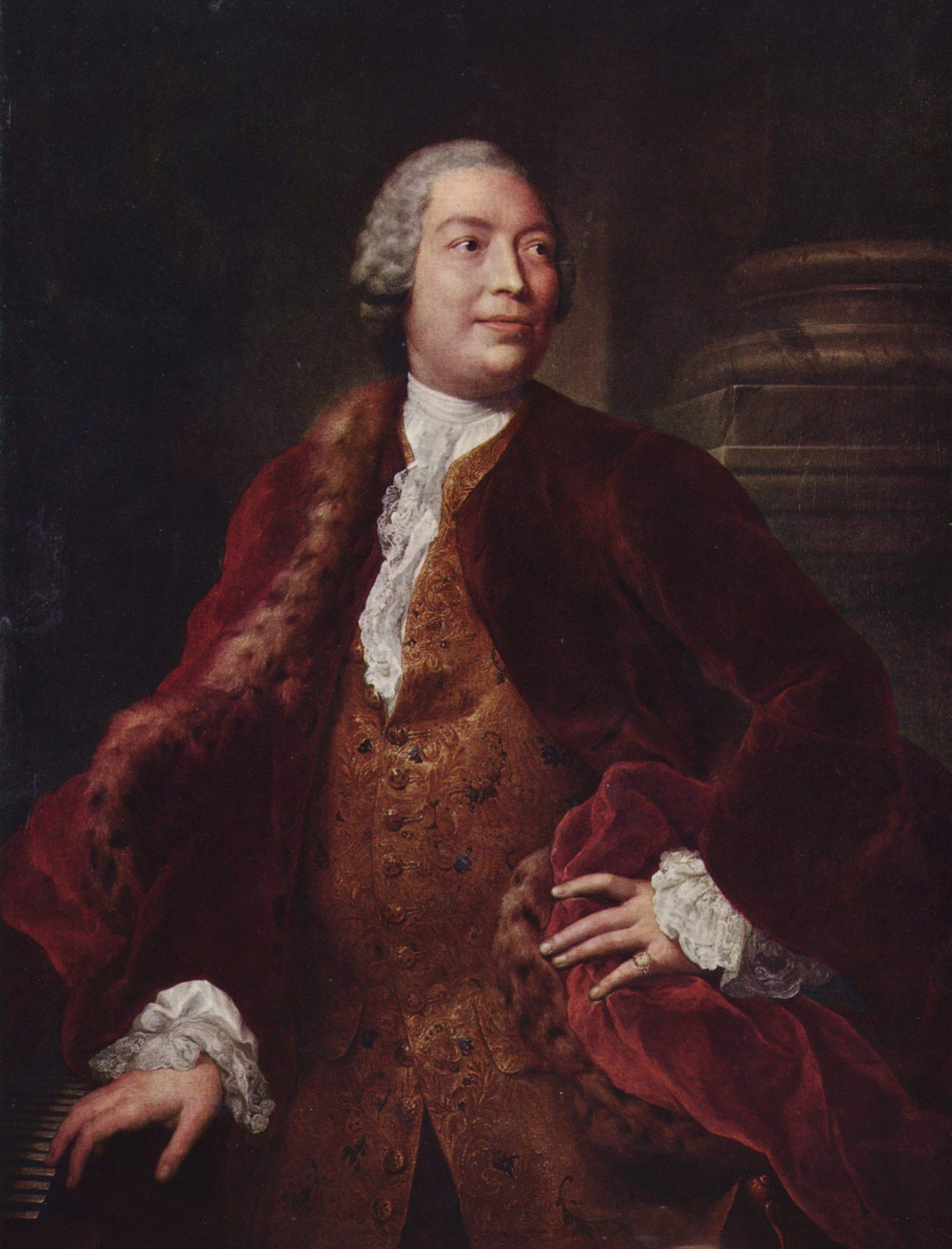
One of two portraits of Domenico Annibali by Anton Raphael Mengs

Domenico Annibali (c. 1705 – 1779) was an Italian castrato who had an active international career from 1725–1764. He began his career in his native country and was then committed to the Grosses Königliches Opernhaus in Dresden from 1729 until his retirement from the stage 35 years later. In Dresden he excelled in the operas of Johann Adolph Hasse, notably creating roles in the premieres of two of his operas. He was also admired there in works by Nicola Porpora.

Annibali also appeared as a guest artist with theatres in Italy and in Vienna and London. He is best remembered today for originating roles in three operas by George Frideric Handel at Covent Garden in 1737. Musicologist Charles Burney wrote that "his abilities during his stay in England seem to have made no deep impression". However, Mary Delany wrote that he had "the best part of Senesino's voice and Caristini's, with a prodigious fine taste and good action." Other accounts of his time in England praised his coloratura facility highly, but found his acting somewhat wooden.

== Life and career ==
Born in Macerata, Annibali's earliest known appearance was in Rome in 1725 in one of Nicola Porpora's operas. After further appearances in Rome in 1726, he was active in theatres in Venice from 1727 until 1729. In 1729, he accepted a post at the Royal Opera House in Dresden where he was active through 1764. In Dresden he was heard in the world premieres of two operas by Johann Adolph Hasse: Cleofide (1731, Alessandro) and Attilio Regolo (1750, title role). He also sang in Hasse's Cajo Fabricio (1734), Tito Vespasiano, Demetrio, Lucio Papirio, Arminio, Semiramide, Demofoonte, and Adriano in Siria. On 18 July 1747, he sang the title role in Porpora's Filandro in a performance honoring the birthday of Princess Maria Antonia Walpurgis of Bavaria.

While committed to the Dresden opera house, Annibali was granted leave to perform as a guest artist at many other theatres internationally. He made appearances in Rome in 1730, 1732, and 1739; notably appearing in the premiere of Porpora's Germanico in Germania at the Teatro Capranica in February 1732. In 1731, he had a major triumph in Vienna in the title role of Antonio Caldara's Demetrio which drew the admiration of Pietro Metastasio. From October 1736 to June 1737, he was a member of George Frideric Handel's opera company at the Royal Opera House in London; making a sensational debut at the theatre on 8 December in the title role of Handel's Poro. He went on to create roles in the world premieres of three operas by Handel: the title roles in Arminio (12 January 1737) and Giustino (16 February 1737), and the role of Demetrio in Berenice (18 May 1737). He also sang in the premieres of Handel's cantata Always a bearer of glory, the pasticcio Didone abbandonata, and in the revised version of Il trionfo del tempo; and in revivals of Partenope, Alexander's Feast, and Esther (in Italian).

When Annibali retired from the stage in 1764, he left Dresden with the title of Kammermusikus and with a pension of 1200 thaler. He returned to his native town where he maintained a residence until 1776 when he moved to Rome. He died in Rome three years later. He was also active as a teacher of singing during his life. One of his notable pupils was the Ukrainian composer Timofiy Bilohradsky.
