= Reichart =

Reichart, Reichhart or Reichardt are surnames, and may refer to:

- Hans Reichhart (born 1982), German politician
- Israel Reichart, Israeli biologist and agriculturist
- Johann Reichhart, German executioner
- Johann Friedrich Reichardt, Prussian composer
- Kelly Reichardt, American film director
- Louis Reichardt, American big-mountain mountaineer
- Margaretha Reichardt (1907-1984), German textile designer and former Bauhaus student
- Martin Reichardt (born 1969), German politician
- Rick Reichardt, American baseball player
- Patricia "Peppermint Patty" Reichardt, a character in the Peanuts comic strip.
- Werner E. Reichardt, German physicist and biologist

also

- Robert Reichert, mayor of Macon, Georgia
