= Yakiv Stepovy =

Ukrainian composer and music critic

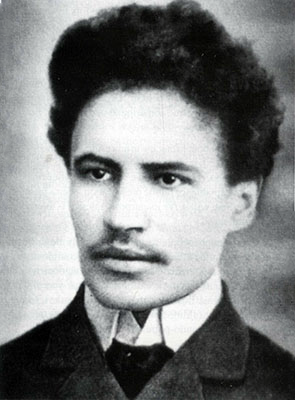
Yakiv Stepovy

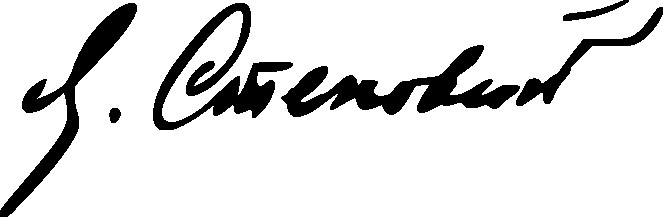
Stepovy's signature

Yakiv Stepanovych Stepovy (Note: also Stepovyi) (né Yakymenko; (Note: Also Akimenko, Ukrainian: Якименко) Ukrainian: Яків Степанович Степовий; 20 October 1883 – 4 November 1921) was a Ukrainian composer, music teacher, and music critic.

== Biography ==
=== Early life and education ===
Stepovy was born on 20 October 1883 as Yakiv Yakymenko (Akimenko) in Kharkiv, in the Russian Empire (in present-day Ukraine). His older brother Theodore Akimenko was also a composer. From 1895 to 1898, Yakiv sang as a boy chorister in the Imperial Court Chapel in Saint Petersburg. From 1898 to 1902, he attended chapel classes, learning to play the piano, and studying music theory and conducting.

Stepovy attended the Saint Petersburg Conservatory from 1902 to 1909, where he studied with the Russian composers Anatoly Lyadov, Nikolai Rimsky-Korsakov, and Alexander Glazunov. Stepovy graduated in 1914.

=== Career ===
Stepovy was a representative of the Ukrainian musical intelligentsia of the 20th century. He was one of the founders of the national school of composition and composed in the tradition of the Ukrainian composer Mykola Lysenko.

During World War I, Stepovy was recruited to the military, where he worked as a secretary on a hospital train. He served in the military for almost three years, being released in April 1917. That year he settled in Kyiv, working as a teacher of music theory at the Kyiv Conservatory (for two years), and as a musical critic.

After Soviet power was established in Ukraine, Stepovy became actively involved in organizing musical life in Kyiv." /> In 1919, he was appointed to be director of the music section of the All-Ukrainian Committee of Arts under the People's Commissariat of Education of the Ukrainian SSR, the head of the music section of the Ukrainian Music and Drama Theatre, and the artistic director of the Committee's vocal ensemble. He established the M.. Lysenko Symphony Orchestra and the Ukrainian State String Quartet.

From 1912–1914 Stepovy wrote articles and reviews for the Moscow periodicals Music and Russian Musical Newspaper.

== Selected works ==
External videos
- MATI Concert: Yakymenko and Stepovy - Two Brothers, Two Fates (2024)

Information from biografija.ru and the biography of Stepovy by V.L. Goshovsky in Musical Encyclopedia.

Stepovy developed the traditions established by previous Ukrainian and Russian classical composers, specialising in choral works such as art songs. Many of his songs have a revolutionary theme.

=== For voice and piano ===
Art songs by Stepovy
The Word
Lyrics by Lesya Ukrainka. Performed by Pavlo Hunka (bass-baritone) and Albert Krywolt (piano)

Do Not Take the Willow from the Green Grove
Lyrics by Oleksandr Oles. Performed by Isabel Bayrakdarian (soprano) and Albert Krywolt (piano)

- Cantabile (1912) for voice and piano
- Song cycles: Barvinki (1906) with words by Ukrainian poets, Songs of Mood (1909) words by A. Oles, romances set to poems by Taras Shevchenko, Ivan Franko, Lesya Ukrainka, and Maksym Rylsky, songs to the words of Ukrainian poets, including Kamnelomy and Kuznets

=== For piano ===
- Sonata (1909)
- Fantasy (1909)
- Two Rondos (1910)
- Two Suites on Ukrainian Folk Themes
- Op. 5 No. 1 Valse in B minor
- Op. 5 No. 2 Elegie in B minor
- Op. 5 No. 3 Menuett in G major
- Op. 5 No. 4 Dance in G major
- Op. 7 No. 4 Prelude in A minor
- Op. 9 No. 1 Prelude in B♭ minor
- Op. 9 No. 2 Prelude in E♭ major
- Op. 12 No. 1 Prelude in F major
- Op. 13 Prelude in Memory of Shevchenko
- Op. 14 Trios morceaux

=== Other works ===
- Romance (1912) for violin and piano
- Collection of children's songs: Podsnedropy, To Little Children, Five School Choirs
- Kobzar (an arrangement of Ukrainian folk songs)
- Revolution songs: "Kamenyari" ("Stonebreakers"), "Koval" ("Blacksmith"), "By the Valley a Village Lies", "Word"
