= Great Synagogue (Velyki Mosty) =

Former synagogue in Velyki Mosty, Ukraine

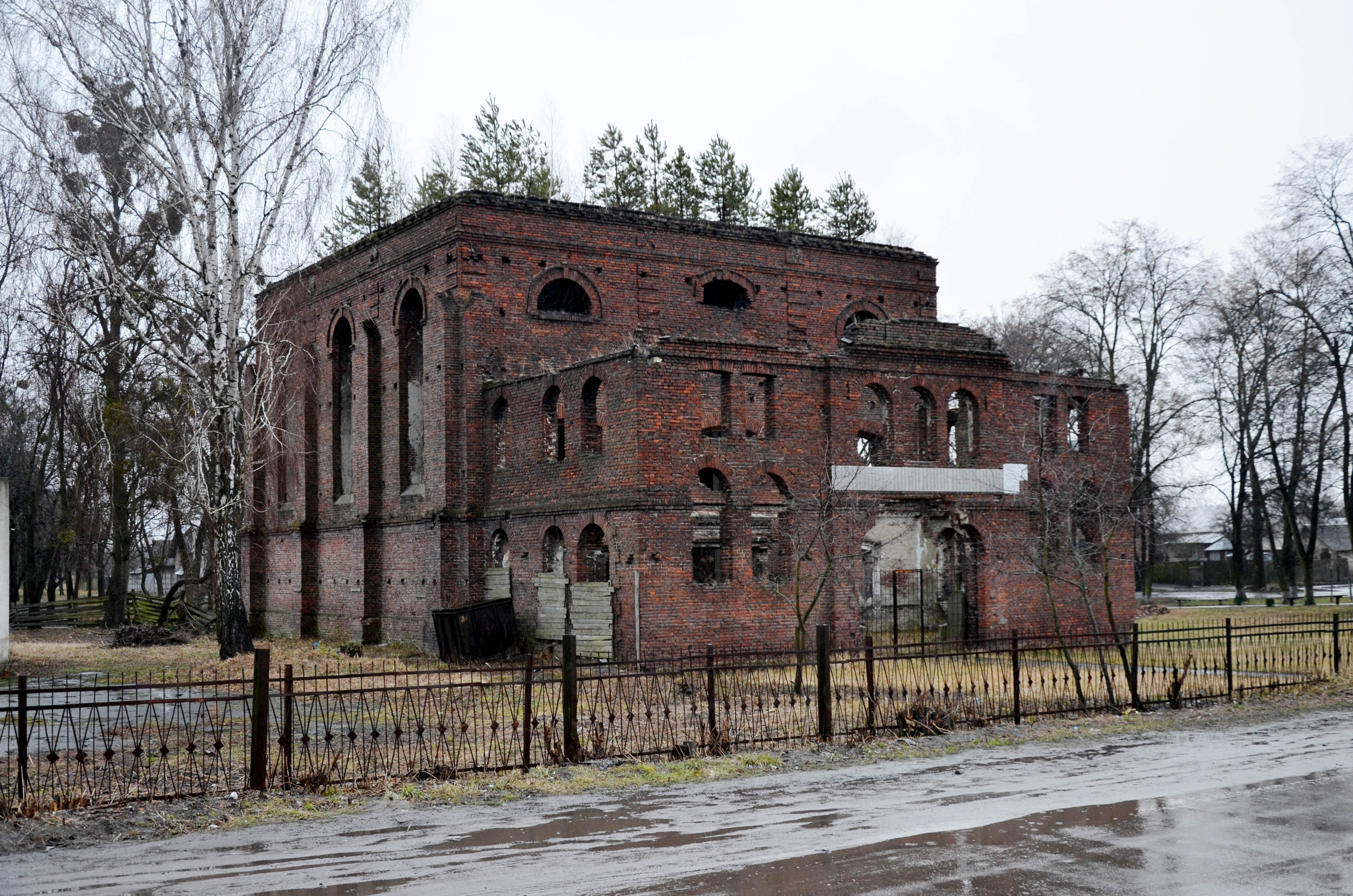
- The ruins of the former synagogue

- Location of the former synagogue in Ukraine

Religion
- Affiliation: Judaism (former)
- Rite: Nusach Ashkenaz
- Ecclesiastical or organizational status: Synagogue (1911– )
- Status: Abandoned

Location
- Location: Bandery Street, Velyki Mosty, Lviv Oblast
- Country: Ukraine
- Interactive map of Great Synagogue
- Coordinates: 50°14′30″N 24°08′26″E

Architecture
- Type: Synagogue architecture
- Style: Baroque Revival
- Completed: 1911
- Materials: Brick

The Great Synagogue is a former Jewish synagogue, located on Bandery Street, in Velyki Mosty, in the Lviv Oblast of Ukraine. The congregation worshipped in the Ashkenazi rite. The former synagogue was completed in 1911 (Note: Variously either 1911 or c. 1900.) has since been abandoned, and is now ruined.

== History ==
By the time the synagogue was built there was another synagogue - the old synagogue - nearby. This was ruined during World War I and later disassembled. The new synagogue, which by this time was not completely finished, was partially destroyed but was repaired after the war. During World War II, the Germans burned alive many local Jews in the building. After the war a new roof was installed on the building and it was used as a storage for cattle bones. In the 1950s a storm threw down the whole roof of the main hall and was never replaced. Afterwards the storage was taken away and since then the building stands without any function and deteriorates more and more.

== Architecture ==
The Baroque Revival former synagogue was a brick building and consisted of the main hall and a narrower and lower narthex. To the north of the former synagogue is a one-storied building that is thought to have been a Mikveh, or Jewish bath-house. The main hall was nearly square (16 square metres (170 sq ft)) and almost 8 metres (26 ft) high; the narthex measured roughly 8 by 16 metres (26 ft × 52 ft). The inside of the main hall was divided by four square arches into nine bays.

== See also ==
- History of the Jews in Ukraine
- Former synagogues in Ukraine
