= New Era Orchestra =

Ukrainian orchestra

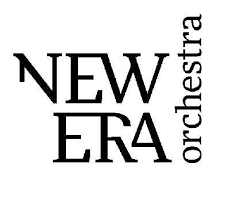
- Founded: 2007
- Location: Kyiv
- Principal conductor: Tetiana Kalinichenko
- Website: neweraorchestra.com

New Era Orchestra is an orchestra from Kyiv, Ukraine, founded in 2007 by its conductor and artistic director Tetiana Kalinichenko. The orchestra plays both contemporary and classical music. Among others, the orchestra has performed with renowned soloists such as Joshua Bell, Sarah Chang, Avi Avital and Danjulo Ishizaka.

== About the orchestra ==
The orchestra’s peculiarity of style is the creation and performance of innovative concert programs. Each concert abounds in samples of contemporary and classical music.

== Activity ==
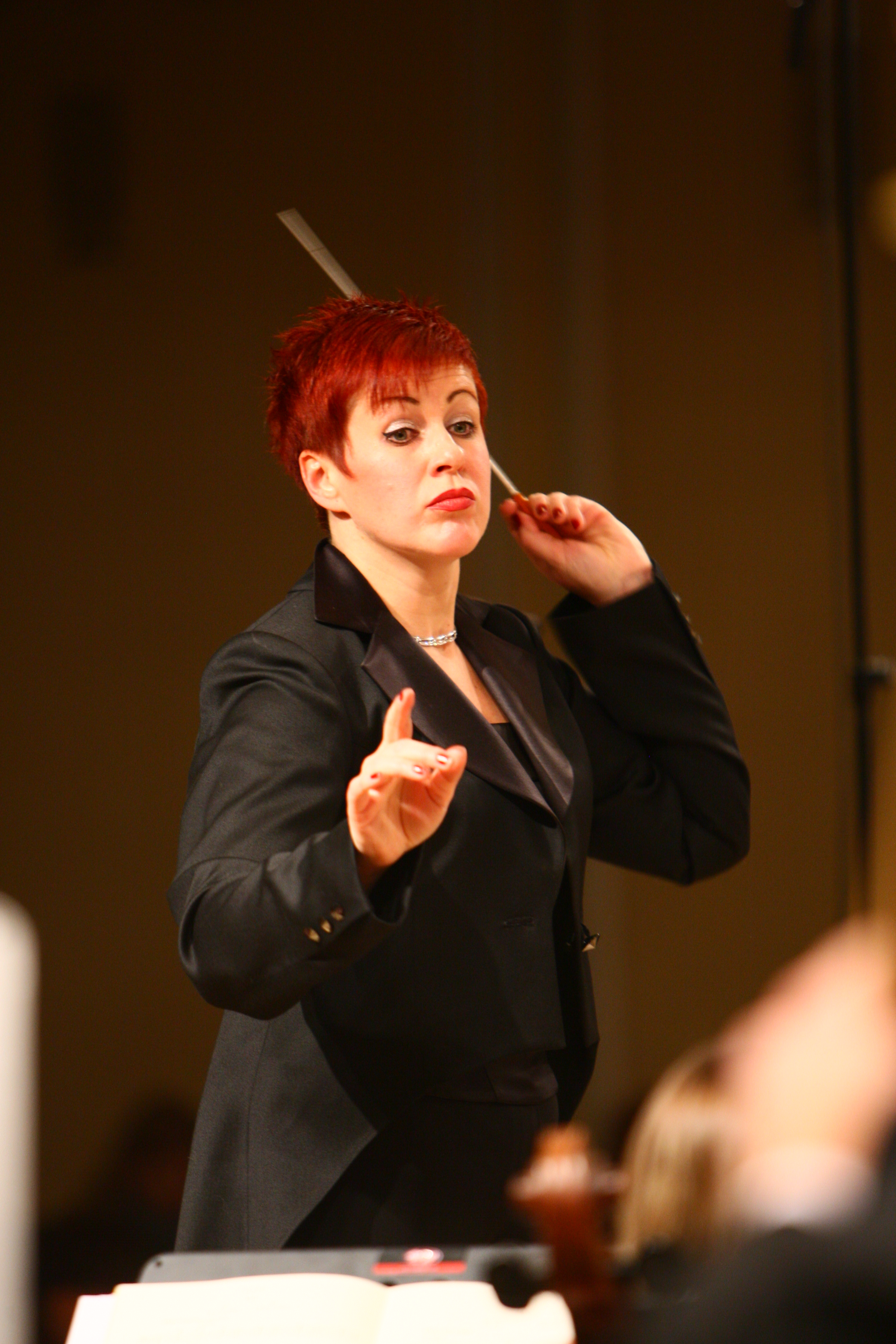
Tetiana Kalinichenko

The troop was assembled in 2007 by Tatiana Kalinichenko (its conductor) in partnership with Andrii Rizol (the chief executive). The orchestra’s international activity was initiated by Evgenii Utkin, investment IT-holding «KM Core» president, and the «Master Class» house of arts and education founder.

The New Era Orchestra is a long-time participant of major cultural events in Ukraine and abroad: Gogolfest multidisciplinary modern art festival, «MOLODIST» international film festival, Jazz in Kiev international jazz festival, contemporary music festival in «Arsenal», G AIDA international contemporary music festival] (Lithuania) and others. The orchestra is no newbie at conquering foreign public. Kyiv – Paris – Moscow tour (2010) was an international project of a large scale. It was devoted to Andrei Tarkovsky, who was one of the most prominent filmmakers of all times.

In Ukraine, the New Era Orchestra was the first to perform music of such composers as: John Adams (US), Philip Glass (US), Michael Nyman (UK), Sir John Tavener (UK), Iannis Xenakis (France), Avner Dorman (Israel/US), Takashi Yoshimatsu (Japan), Marjan Mozetich (Canada), Georgs Pelēcis (Latvia) and Arturs Maskats (Latvia). Except for that, the orchestra introduced premiers of some scores by such contemporary composers as: Joaquín Rodrigo (Spain), Yasushi Akutagawa (Japan), Vladimir Martynov (Russia), Pavel Karmanov (Russia), Leonid Desyatnikov (Russia), Krzysztof Penderecki (Poland), Arvo Pärt (Estonia), Giya Kancheli (Georgia), Pēteris Vasks (Latvia), Giovanni Sollima (Italy) and others.

The orchestra has worked with many worldwide known soloists, including Joshua Bell (violin, US), Sarah Chang (violin, US), Avi Avital (mandolin, Israel/Germany), Danjulo Ishizaka (cello, Germany/Japan), Roman Mints (violin, Russia/UK), Anja Lechner (cello, Germany), Dino Saluzzi (bandoneon, Argentina). The orchestra often performs with leading Ukrainian soloists, for instance Kyrylo Sharapov (violin), Dmytro Marchenko (vibraphone), Roman Repka (piano), Artem Poludenny (cello), Solomia Prymak (soprano) and many others.

== Conductor and artistic director ==
Tatiana Kalinichenko is artistic director and chief conductor of the New Era Orchestra. She has become famous in Ukraine owing to her experiments with the academic music, which eventually formed the orchestra’s individual style. In 2003, Kalinichenko completed an opera-symphonic conducting course led by Professor V. Gnedash in Petro Tchaikovsky National Music Academy of Ukraine. She also worked as a conductor in the studio «Young Opera» patronized by NMAU and in Dnipropetrovsk Academic Opera and Ballet Theater (2004–2006). From 2004 to 2010 Kalinichenko was a conductor of the National Presidential Orchestra of Ukraine.

Since 2007, Kalinichenko has become the art director and conductor of the New Era Orchestra and since 2010 she has also been artistic director of the project MK Classics in the House of Arts and Education «Master Klass».

== Soloists ==
The orchestra actively collaborates with the best Ukrainian soloists of the new generation, among which are:

- Andrey Pavlov – violin.

He graduated from NMAU and Glier Kyiv Institute of Music. He has a lot of concerts in Ukraine and abroad (Netherlands, Spain, Germany, France, Austria, in Radiokulturhaus in Vienna, in UNESCO House in Paris).
Andrey Pavlov and Valeria Shulga, as the members of the duet «Sonoro», became the laureates of such contests as Johannes Brahms competition (Austria), Salieri-Zinetti (Italy), Stasys Vainiunas competition (Lithuania), Dmitry Bortniansky competition (Ukraine).
Since 2016 Andrey has been the musician of the National Chamber Ensemble «Kyiv Soloists».

- Kyrylo Sharapov – violin

In 2006 he completed the violin course in Petro Tchaikovsky National Music Academy of Ukraine and attended the assistant traineeship in 2009. 2010 was another year of training for him but this time it was in Netherlands String Quartet Academy. Odyssey and ProQuartet Scholar (France, 2007). International Chamber Music Academy Scholar (Lower Saxony, Germany, 2008–2009) and International Music Academy Scholar (France, 2008). He is a laureate of international competitions (1995–2008), musician and co-organizer of the Kiev-Tango-Project (2011).

- Artem Poludennyi – cello

Having studied cello, orchestra department, in Petro Tchaikovsky National Music Academy of Ukraine, he became the soloist of the Lviv National Philharmonic.

== Musical Bridges project ==
The project «Musical Bridges» is a long-term initiative aimed at fostering the cultural exchange between leading Ukrainian and foreign musicians in the field of contemporary and classical academic music. The main goal of the project is to integrate Ukraine into the global cultural space and promote high-quality audio arts in Ukraine. In 2019 the project is held as a part of Bilateral Cultural Year Austria–Ukraine 2019, supported by Ukrainian cultural foundation, Austrian Embassy Kyiv and Austrian Cultural Forum New York. The organization of the project is conducted by the charity fund «Believe in yourself».

== Mentions in press ==
- "Perezagruzka. Sekrety upravlenija vpechatlenijami" (2011), (in Russian), Companion, 18 (May, 13–19).
- Morozova, Lyubov (2010), "Sauntreki dlya skripki s orkestrom" (in Russian), Kommersant, 222(1270), (December, 20).
- Lenskaya, Elena (2010), "Dirizher Tatiana Kalinichenko: Sredi moih zritelej – hippi v bantikah" (in Russian), Izvestija v Ukraine, (December, 20).
- Koskin, Volodymyr (2010), "Tetiana Kalinichenko: Najkrashche keruvaty svojim korablem", (in Ukrainian), Demokratychna Ukraina, (October, 15).
- Morozova, Lyubov (2010), "Slushatelej poprosili ozhivitsya", (in Russian), Kommersant, 153 (1201), (September, 14).
- Borysova, Olexandra (2008), "Muzykanty novoji ery", (in Ukrainian), Khreshchatyk, (November, 13).
- Tymurshaeva, Natalija (2007), "Muzekskursy v Muzeji Gonchara", (in Ukrainian), Dzerkalo Tyzhnya, 16, (May, 11).
