= Andrii Rachinsky =

Ukrainian composer

Andriy Andriyovich Rachinsky (Ukrainian: Андрій Андрійович Рачинський, romanized: Andriy Andriyovych Rachynskyi; 24 November 1724, Velyki Mosty–1794, Novhorod-Siverskyi) was a Ukrainian statesman, composer and conductor of the Hetmanate era.

== Biography ==
Andriy Andriyovich Rachinsky came from the noble family of Raczynski of Ukrainian-Polish origin, which stemmed from Podlachia. He was born in Velyki Mosty near Sokal, Galicia. He was educated in Lviv, where he was the regent of episcopal chapel of St. George's Cathedral from 1750 until 1753. In 1753 Rachynskyi moved to Dnieper Ukraine, where he served as the court bandmaster of Hetman Kirill Razumovsky. Starting from 1760, Rachynskyi was commissioned with the recruitment of young singers for the Saint Petersburg Court Chapel in Hlukhiv, Starodub, Krolevets, Novhorod-Siverskyi and other cities in the region.

In 1763 he moved to Novhorod-Siverskyi, becoming the centurion in the Novhorod hundred of Starodub Regiment. He retained that position until 1781, and eventually received the title of bunchuk comrade (1780). After 1781 he served in the administration of Novgorod-Seversky Viceroyalty. He later served as a court musician in Saint Petersburg, specializing in chamber music. As a sign of reverence, Peter III gifted Rachinsky with a Stradivarius violin, which would be later used by his son.

== Compositions ==
Rachinsky authored a number of choral concertos, which had a major influence on the development of that genre in Ukraine and Russia. Among his notable works are Скажи мі, Господи, кончину мою (Tell Me, O Lord, of My End) and Не отвержи мене во время старости (Reject Me Not in Old Age).

== Family ==
His wife Marina was a niece of Metropolitan Stefan Yavorsky, and a relative of the General Treasurer Yakiv Markovych; his son Havrylo Rachinsky was a violinist, guitarist and composer. His great-grandson Oleksandr Rachinsky was a zemstvo activist, deputy of the Ministry of Education of the Ukrainian People's Republic, and a close friend of the Moscow writer Aleksey Konstantinovich Tolstoy.

== See also ==
- List of Ukrainian composers
