= Velyki Mosty =

City in Lviv Oblast, Ukraine

Velyki Mosty Великі Мости
- City
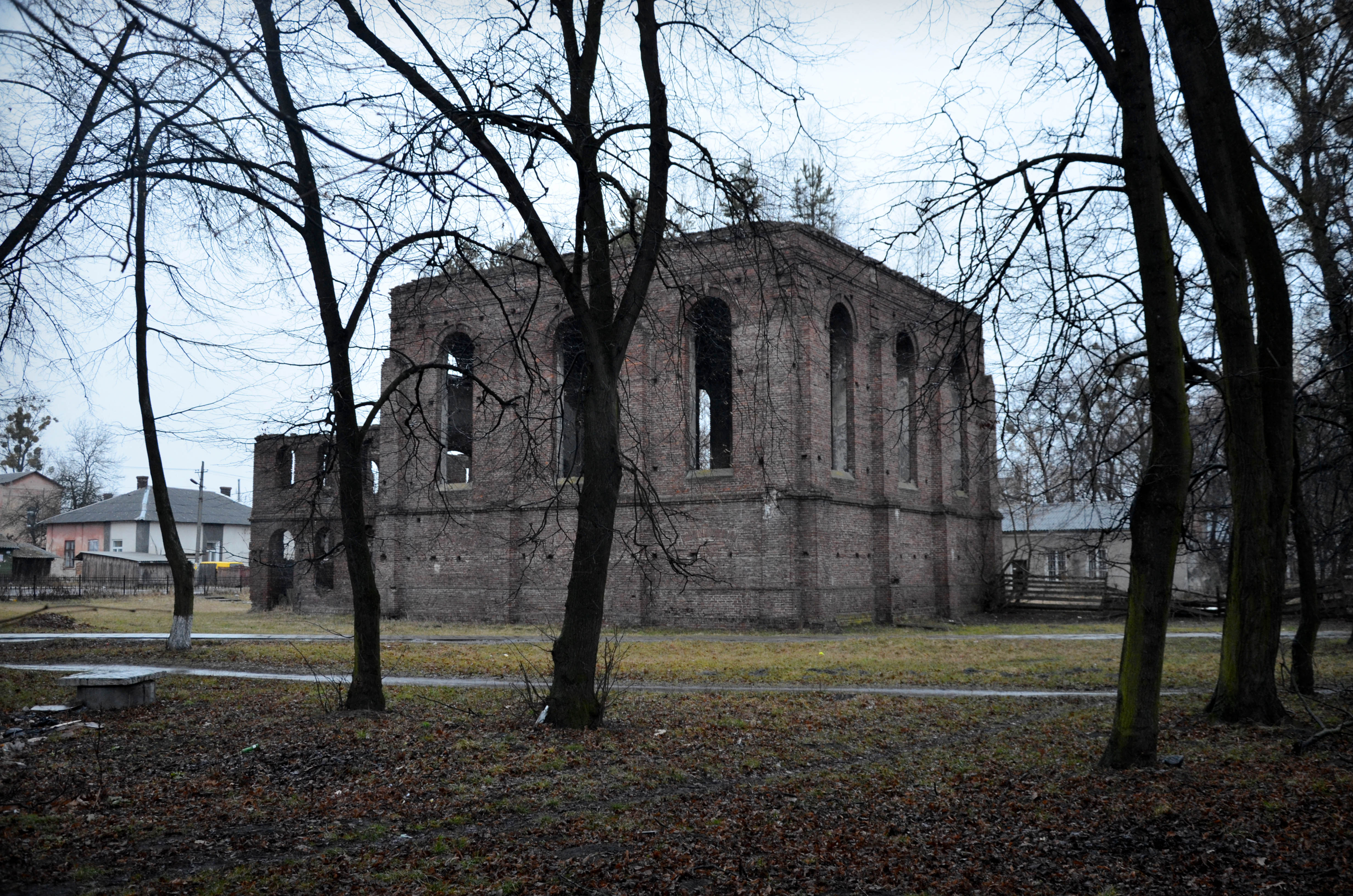
- Synagogue

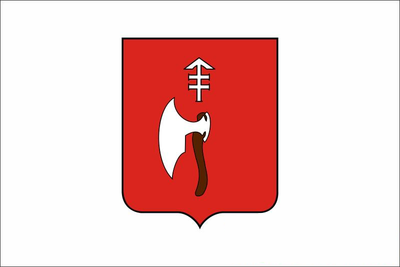
- Flag Coat of arms

- Location of Velyki Mosty in Lviv Oblast Location of Velyki Mosty in Ukraine Location of Velyki Mosty in Europe
- Coordinates: 50°14′24″N 24°08′22″E
- Country: Ukraine
- Oblast: Lviv Oblast
- Raion: Sheptytskyi Raion
- Hromada: Velyki Mosty urban hromada

Population (2022)
  - Total: 6,286
  - Density: 7,738/km^{2} (20,040/sq mi)
- Time zone: UTC+2 (EET)
  - Summer (DST): UTC+3 (EEST)
- Website: www.velyki%20mosty-adm.gov.ua

Velyki Mosty (Ukrainian: Великі Мости, IPA: [weˈlɪki moˈstɪ], lit. 'Great Bridges'; Polish: Mosty Wielkie; Yiddish: גרויס־מאָסטע, romanized: Groys-Moste) is a city in Sheptytskyi Raion of Lviv Oblast (region) of western Ukraine. It hosts the administration of Velyki Mosty urban hromada, one of the hromadas of Ukraine. Its population is 6,286 (2022 estimate).

== History ==
Historical affiliations

Kingdom of Poland 1472–1772
Habsburg monarchy 1772–1918
Second Polish Republic 1918–1939
Soviet Union 1939–1941 (occupation)
Nazi Germany 1941–1944 (occupation)
Soviet Union 1944–1991
Ukraine 1991–present

In the Kingdom of Poland, the village of Mosty was a royal property, with its own starostas. The village itself was established in 1472, and was part of Belz Voivodeship in the Lesser Poland Province. In the late 15th century, Mosty was ransacked and destroyed in a Crimean Tatars raid, and in July 1497, during the Moldavian expedition of John I Albert, a unit of Teutonic Knights under Johann von Tiefen, called upon by the Polish king, marched through the village. On 23 July 1549, during the period known as the Polish Golden Age, Mosty received Magdeburg rights. It was a royal town. Following the order of King Sigismund II Augustus, a nobleman Andrzej Rokicki became the first local wójt. Mosty enjoyed several royal privileges, issued in the years 1550, 1553, 1566, 1576, 1583, 1604. The town also became the seat of a starosta.

Following the First Partition of Poland (1772), the town became part of Austrian Galicia. In 1846, a complex of military barracks was built in Mosty. In the Second Polish Republic, the Central Police Academy was located here.

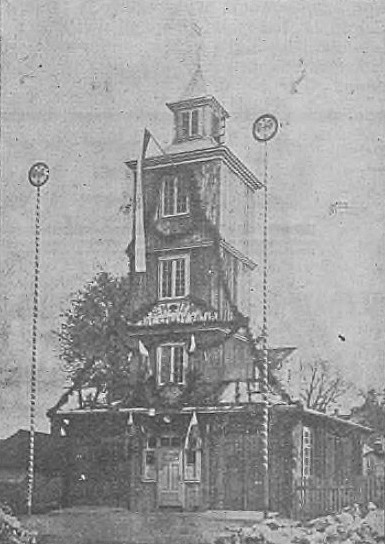
Fire station in 1937

The Jewish population was important in the town before World War II.

Following the joint German-Soviet invasion of Poland, which started World War II in September 1939, the town was initially occupied by the Soviet Union. In 1939, the Soviets carried out a massacre of the staff and trainees of the local Polish police academy. Afterwards, as of June 29, 1941, Germans occupied the town and kept the Jews prisoners in a ghetto using them as forced labour before murdering them all. In early July, 1941, local residents burned 19 Jews in the synagogue. Throughout the occupation, Ukrainian police assisted in most of the murders of their Jewish neighbors. The town commander, Captain Johann Kroupa in the military-engineer division of the Wehrmacht, protected Jews from death during the first part of the occupation, employing more than 2,000, including 1,200 women, and helping forge work permits for some. He was later court-martialed for protecting Jews and ended up in Soviet captivity.

Until 18 July 2020, Velyki Mosty belonged to Sokal Raion. The raion was abolished in July 2020 as part of the administrative reform of Ukraine, which reduced the number of raions of Lviv Oblast to seven. The area of Sokal Raion was merged into Chervonohrad Raion (modern Sheptytskyi Raion).

Currently, Mosty has a local branch of the Association of Polish Culture of the Lviv Land.

== Population ==
Currently, as of 2021, the population of the town is 6,312 people.

Historical population

Year	Pop.	±%
1880	~4,000	—
1890	3,565	—
1959	3,789	—
1970	3,920	+3.5%
1979	4,516	+15.2%
1989	5,494	+21.7%
1992	5,800	+5.6%
1998	6,100	+5.2%
2001	5,925	−2.9%

Year	Pop.	±%
2003	5,877	−0.8%
2004	5,882	+0.1%
2005	5,894	+0.2%
2006	5,934	+0.7%
2007	5,960	+0.4%
2008	5,971	+0.2%
2009	5,996	+0.4%
2010	6,010	+0.2%
2011	6,037	+0.4%

Year	Pop.	±%
2012	6,094	+0.9%
2013	6,121	+0.4%
2014	6,132	+0.2%
2015	6,166	+0.6%
2016	6,213	+0.8%
2017	6,224	+0.2%
2018	6,251	+0.4%
2019	6,298	+0.8%
2021	6,312	+0.2%

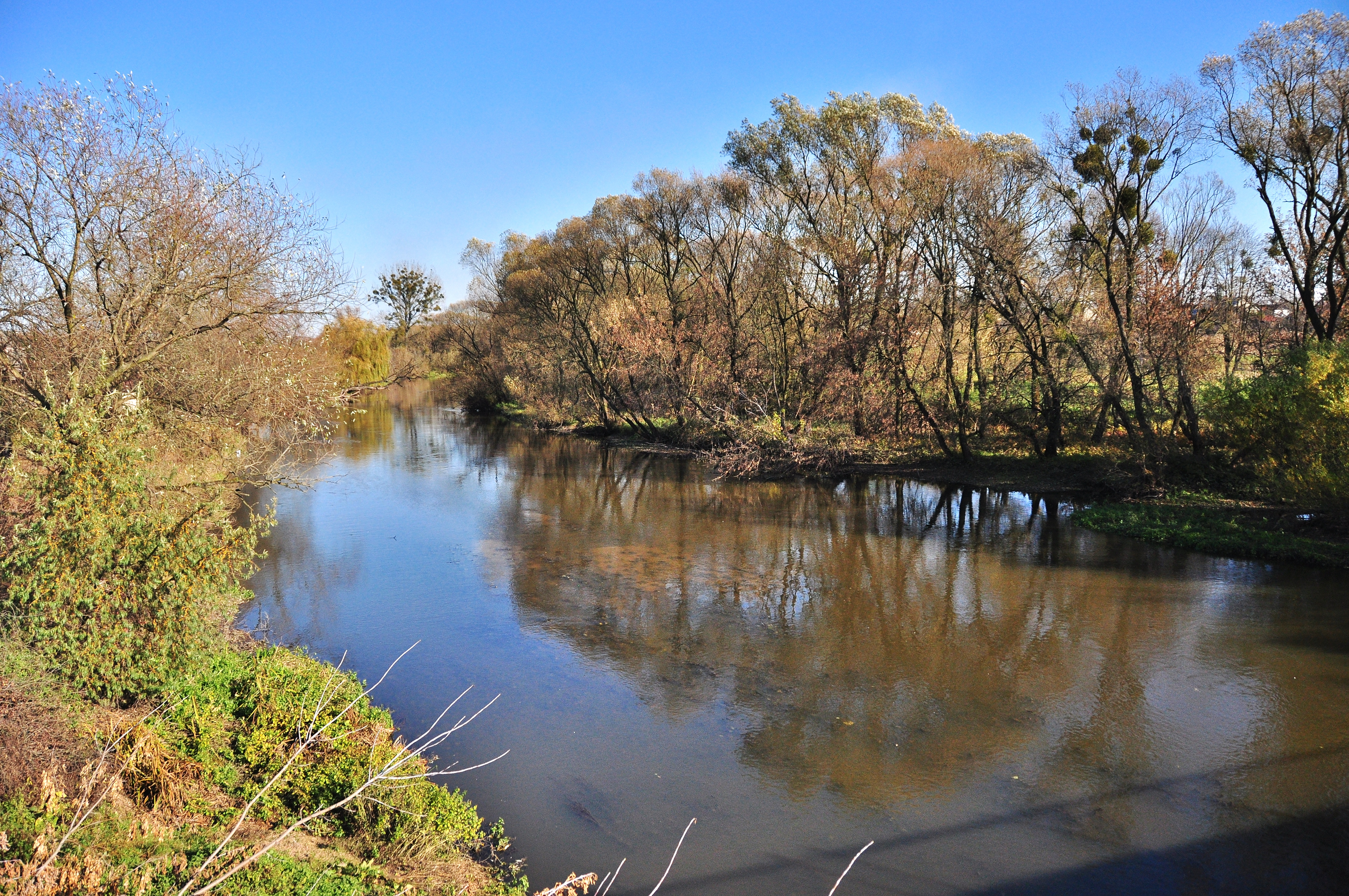
Rata River in Velyki Mosty

== Notable people ==
- Wlodzimierz Puchalski, Polish photographer.
- Andrii Rachinsky, Ukrainian composer.
- Wlodzimierz Stozek, Polish mathematician.
- Siegfried Weyr, Austrian painter.
