= Bulgarian Tsardom =

Bulgarian Tsardom or Tsardom of Bulgaria may refer to:

== Medieval ==
- First Bulgarian Empire or First Bulgarian Tsardom
- Second Bulgarian Empire or Second Bulgarian Tsardom

== Modern ==
- Kingdom of Bulgaria, or Third Bulgarian Tsardom

== See also ==
- Bulgarian Empire
- Bulgarians
