= Vitaliy Hodziatsky =

Ukrainian composer and teacher (born 1936)

Vitaliy Oleksiyovych Hodziatsky Віталій Олексійович Годзяцький
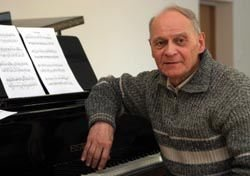

Background information
- Born: December 26, 1936 (age 89); Kiev, Ukrainian SSR, Soviet Union
- Genres: Classical
- Occupations: Composer, music teacher

Vitaliy Oleksiyovych Hodziatsky (Note: Ukrainian: Віталій Олексійович Годзяцький, romanized: Vitalii Oleksiiovych Hodziatskyi) (born 26 December 1936) is a Ukrainian composer and teacher. He was made a Merited Artist of Ukraine in 1996.

He was born in Kyiv and studied at Kyiv Conservatory with Borys Lyatoshynsky, graduating in 1961. He has composed music for piano, orchestra, voice, and solo woodwind and string instruments.
