= Leonid Hrabovsky =

Ukrainian composer

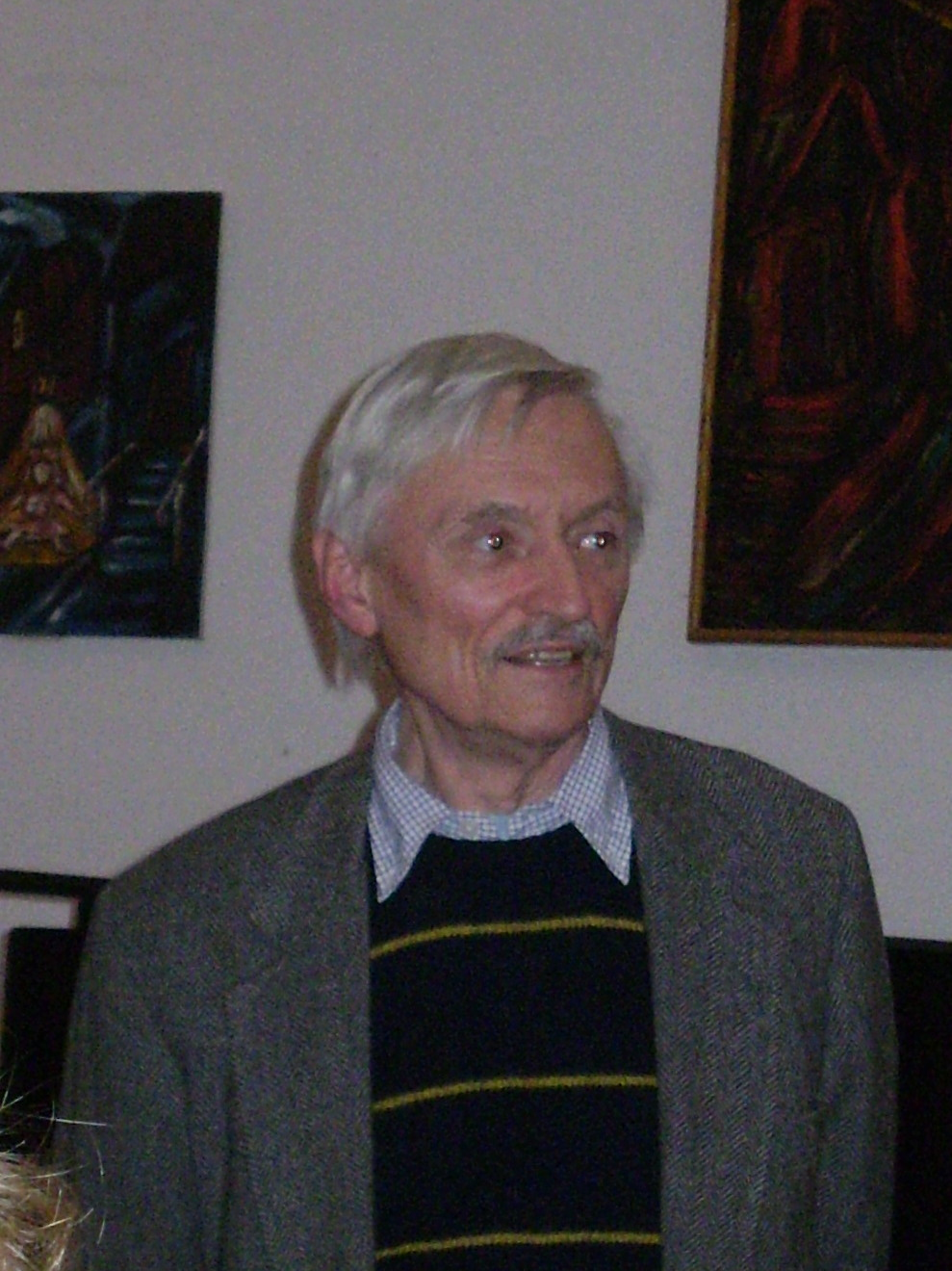
Hrabovsky in 2008

Leonid Oleksandrovych Hrabovsky (also Hrabovsky or Hrabovs'ky, Ukrainian: Леонід Олександрович Грабовський; Russian: Леонид Александрович Грабовский, romanized: Leonid Aleksandrovitch Grabovsky; born 28 January 1935) is a contemporary Ukrainian composer, now living in the United States.

== Biography ==
Leonid Hrabovsky is one of the group of Ukrainian composers whose works indicated the opening of the modernist era in Ukrainian music of the late 20 century.

Hrabovsky studied economics at Kiev University (1951–1956), and from 1954 composition under Boris Lyatoshynsky and Lev Revutsky at Kiev Conservatory which he graduated in 1959. His diploma work "Four Ukrainian Songs" for chorus and orchestra (1959) which won first prize in an all-union competition. Shostakovich wrote about this: 'the Ukrainian Songs by Hrabovsky pleased me immensely—his arrangements attracted me by the freedom of treatment and good choral writing'.

In the early 1960s Hrabovsky taught theory and composition at the Kiev Conservatory. He belonged to group of the so-called Kiev avant-garde (as well as Hodzyatsky, Huba, Silvestrov, Yevhen Stankovych and Zahortsev). Leonid was active as a composer, editor, and translator. He was one of the first Soviet composers to adopt minimalism. His works include Dramatic, Orchestral, Chamber, Vocal Music and music for solo instruments. Hrabovsky's works show Asian influences.

In 1981 he moved to Moscow. In 1987 he worked as an editor for "Sovetskaya muzika" magazine. In 1990 he moved to the US at the invitation of the Ukrainian Music Society. He settled in Brooklyn. Since 1990 to 1994 he was composer-in-residence at the Ukrainian Institute of America.

== Works ==
=== Operas ===
- The Bear (chamber opera after Chekhov; piano score) 1963.
- The Marriage Proposal (chamber opera after Chekhov; piano score) 1964.

=== Symphonic/orchestral ===
- Symphonic Frescoes on a Theme of Boris Prorokov Op. 10, 1961.
- Four Inventions (transcription of Op. 11a for chamber orchestra), 1965.
- Small Chamber Music No.1 (chamber strings, 15 players), 1966. Homoeomorphy IV, 1970
- Small Chamber Music No.2 (oboe, harp, 12 strings), 1971.
- Meditation and Pathetic Recitative (string orchestra), 1972.
- Five Character Pieces (transcription of Op. 11b for orchestra), 1975.
- On St. John's Eve (symphony legend after Gogol), 1976
- “ARRY” for String Orchestra (2018),
- “Credo” for Brass, Strings, Percussion, Piccolo Flute & Four-Hands Piano

&

=== Chamber/instrumental ===
- Sonata Op.8 (unaccompanied violin), 1959.
- Four Two-Part Inventions Op.11a (piano), 1962.
- Five Character Pieces Op.11b (piano), 1962
- Trio for Violin, Contrabass and Piano (1964, rev. 1975)
- Microstructures (unaccompanied oboe), 1964.
- Constants (solo violin, 4 pianos, 6 percussion groups), 1964
- Homoeomorphies I-III (piano; III, 2 pianos), 1968–9.
- Ornaments (oboe, harp or guitar, viola; variable duration), 1969.
- Bucolic Strophes (organ), 1976.
- Concorsuono (unaccompanied French horn), 1977.
- Concerto misterioso (flute, clarinet, bassoon, antique cymbals, harpsichord, harp, violin, viola, cello), 1977.
- Fuer Elise (piano), 1988.
- Hlas I (unaccompanied cello), 1990.
- And It Will Be (8 musical settings to poems by Mykola Vorobyov, for mezzo-soprano, piano, synthesizer, violin, and clarinet), premiered 1993.
- Hlas II (obituary for Dmitri Shostakovich, unaccompanied bass-clarinet), 1994.
- Visions fugitives (wind quintet), 2015.
- 12 Two-Part Inventions for Harpsichord (2016),
- “Tetragon” – Symphony-Capriccio for 4 Guitars & Strings (2017),
- “EQVIN” for Violin & Piano (both 2019)
- “STR-O-r-GAN for Organ (2020)

=== Vocal/choral ===
- Four Ukrainian Songs Op.6 (mixed chorus, orchestra; folk texts) 1959.
- Five Poems by Vladimir Mayakovsky Op/9 (baritone, piano) 1962
- Two A Cappela Choruses (Mayakovsky, Asseyev) 1964
- Pastels (female voice, violin, viola, cello, double bass; Tychyna) 1964, revised 1975.
- From Japanese Haiku (tenor, piccolo, basson, xylophone) 1964, revised 1975.
- La Mer/The Sea (speaker, chorus, organ, orchestra; St John Perse) 1966–70.
- Marginalia on Heissenbuettel (speaker, 2 trumpets, trombone, percussion) 1967, revised 1975.
- Kogda (soprano, violin, clarinet, piano with additional percussion, strings ad lib.; Khlebnikov) 1987.
- Temnere mortem for 4-part mixed chamber chorus a cappella (Skovoroda), 1991
- I Bude Tak/And It Will Be (soprano, violin, clarinet, piano/CASIO-100 Tonebank synthesizer with additional percussion), 1993.

=== Music for guitar ===
- The Night Blues
- Tango & Foxtrot
- Homages (7 Pieces)
- 3 Pieces in an Old Style

=== By Hrabovsky ===
- "On My Teacher", memoir on Boris Liatoshinsky) in Sovetskaya Muzyka, 2, 1969;
- "Splendor and a Bit of Misery", in Sovietskaya Muzyka, 10, 1988;
- "Zauber der ukrainischen Musik", in Die Musik, 1, 1989.

== Notes and references ==
=== Articles on Hrabovsky ===
- Grigori Golovinski, "Bold and Original", in Sovietskaya Muzyka, 10, 1962;
- Yuli Malyshev, "Symphonic Frescoes by L. H. " in "Ukrainian Musicology", Kiev, 1968;
- V. Baley: 'Die Avantgarde von Kiew: ein Retrospektive auf halbem Weg', Melos/NZM, ii (1976), 185–92
- Hannelore Gerlach, "Portrat—L. H. ", in MuG, 12, 1977.
- V. Tsenova and V. Barsky, ed.: Muzïka s bïvshego SSSR [Music from the former USSR] (Moscow, 1994)
