= Ihor Blazhkov =

Ukrainian conductor (1936–2026)

- Ігор Блажков
- Born: 23 September 1936; Kyiv, Ukrainian SSR, Soviet Union
- Died: 7 January 2026 (aged 89); Potsdam, Brandenburg, Germany

Ihor Ivanovych Blazhkov (Ukrainian: Ігор Іванович Блажков; 23 September 1936 – 7 January 2026) was a Ukrainian conductor. He was a recipient of the People's Artist of the Ukrainian SSR (1990).

== Life and career ==
Blazhkov graduated from the conducting faculty of the Kyiv Conservatory (1959), in the same year he became a diploma winner of the republican competition of conductors, worked as a conductor in the Ukrainian State Symphony Orchestra. He corresponded with prominent Western musicians, including Igor Stravinsky, Edgard Varèse and Karlheinz Stockhausen, and participated in the preparation of Stravinsky's tours in the USSR (1962). Then he studied at the postgraduate course of the Leningrad Conservatory with Yevgeny Mravinsky (graduated in 1967). From 1963 to 1968, he worked as a conductor of the Leningrad Philharmonic. Already at this stage, as Sofia Khentova noted in 1965, "he established himself as an initiative performer of forgotten, little-known works". After a break of almost 30 years, he performed Dmitri Shostakovich's Second and Third Symphonies. He was dismissed by the decision of the Board of the USSR Ministry of Culture for performing avant-garde music.

From 1969 to 1976, Blazhkov led the Kyiv Chamber Orchestra, performing numerous works by composers of different eras and countries, from Baroque to modern Ukrainian. In almost every concert of the ensemble there were works marked: "Performed in Kyiv for the first time", "Performed in the USSR for the first time" or "Performed for the first time". By 1983 he began leading the Perpetuum Mobile Chamber Orchestra of the Union of Composers of Ukraine, with which he had performed numerous rare and forgotten works, including archival materials from the collection of the Berlin Singing Academy, taken out of Germany after World War II, which were stored in Kyiv. He also continued to perform works by modern composers. In 1988–1994 he was the artistic director and chief conductor of the State Symphony Orchestra of Ukraine. Then he was illegally dismissed and left without a job, as a result of which in 2002 he emigrated to Germany. Blazhkov lived in Potsdam, where he died on 7 January 2026, at the age of 89.

== Legacy ==
According to one critic, Blazhkov was "known as a conductor to whom modern composers entrusted their notes with the ink still fresh, as a musician-educator, a tireless researcher and restorer of forgotten masterpieces of world musical literature." Another reviewer called him "one of the main Ukrainian musicians of the 20th century." In total, he is said to have performed about 400 works.
