= St. Petersburg State Academic Capella =

Russian professional musical institution since 1479

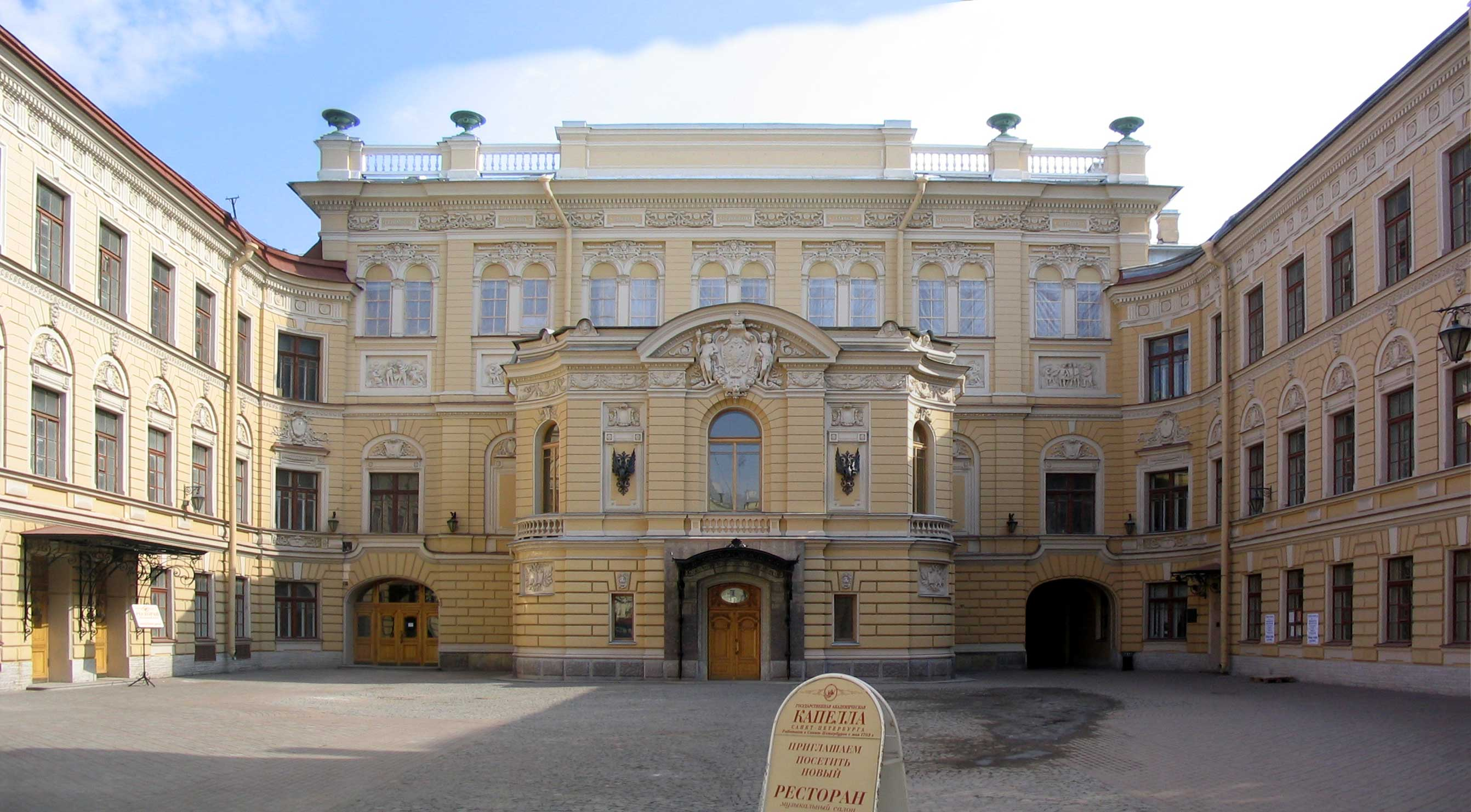
The exterior of the concert hall of the capella.

The St. Petersburg State Academic Capella (Russian: Государственная академическая капелла Санкт-Петербурга) (also: Glinka State Academic Capella), is the oldest active Russian professional musical institution with a history dating back to 1479. It is based in the city of Saint Petersburg. It has had various names over the years, including "St. Peterburg Court Chapel" (Russian: Императорская Придворная певческая капелла) and the "Glinka State Choir of St. Petersburg".

The institution currently consists of a choir, an orchestra, and has its own concert hall. It also had an educational music college at one point, which is currently independent of the Court Capella.

In 2000, the Saint Petersburg State Academic Capella was awarded the Liliane Bettencourt Choral Singing Prize in partnership with the Académie des beaux-arts. This award honours the Capella's quality musical output in keeping with Russia's choral tradition.

== Sources ==
- Carolyn C. Dunlop. The Russian Court Chapel Choir 1796-1917. Routledge, 2013. ISBN 1134422059 ISBN 9781134422050
- Jopi Harri. St. Petersburg Court Chant and the Tradition of Eastern Slavic Church Singing. Finland, University of Turku, 2011. ISBN 978-951-29-4863-5 ISBN 978-951-29-4864-2
