= Volodymyr Kudryavtsev =

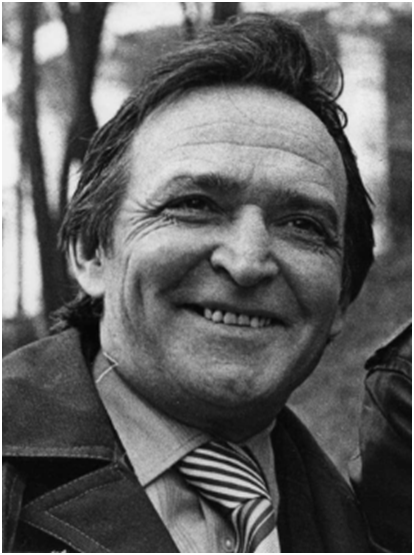

Volodymyr Oleksiyovych Kudryavtsev (Ukrainian: Володимир Олексійович Кудрявцев, 7 October 1934 – 30 April 2014) was a prominent Ukrainian lyricist, renowned for his popularity during the 1970s and 1980s.

Overall, Volodymyr Kudryavtsev authored approximately 700 lyrics and poems, most of which remain unknown to the public. Throughout his career, he collaborated with many famous composers, including O. Zuev, I. Shamo, O. Bilash, M. Mozgovy, O. Semenova, E. Martynov, and V. Ivasyuk. His major hit, “Stozhary,” was created in collaboration with composer and singer Pavlo Dvorsky. Other well-known songs included “A My u Dvoh,” “Zapytay u Serdsya,” “Shovkova Kosytsya,” “Povir Ocham,” and “Sche ne Vechir.”

Volodymyr’s songs were performed by artists such as Nazariy Yaremchuk, Vasyl Zinkevych, Sofia Rotaru, Liliya Sandulesa, Lina Prohorova, Radmila Karaklajich, Evgen Martynov, Viktor Shportko, Ala Kudlay, and Nadiya Chepraga, as well as popular Ukrainian bands like “Kobza,” “Vodogray,” “Charivni Gitary,” “Plamya,” and “Kalyna.”

Volodymyr Kudryavtsev's achievements were recognized by the Ukrainian government: he was awarded the title of “Honored Artist of Ukraine” and received a Presidential Honorary Certificate “for his personal contribution to the development of the Ukrainian state and the strengthening of its independence.”

== Career ==
Kudryavtsev was born in the village of Synelnykove in Dnipropetrovsk Oblast.

In the mid-1950s, Kudryavtsev managed a cultural club in the town of Shakhty in the Rostov region. During this time, he took singing and accordion lessons at the Rostov Art School. When he moved to Chișinău (Moldova), he took on various roles: hosting concerts, lecturing, writing stage scripts, and even considering writing a musical. He also worked part-time as an actor.

In the early 1960s, Kudryavtsev worked at the Dnieper Hydroelectric Station, where he met Les Tanyuk and Vyacheslav Chornovil. Soon after, he moved to Kyiv, the capital of Ukraine, where he worked as a voice actor at the Dovzhenko Film Studios. He also began teaching at the Kyiv School of Culture but was dismissed shortly afterward due to accusations of anti-Soviet propaganda.

In the mid-1960s, Volodymyr became the club director at a polytechnic school in Kyiv. In 1968, he formed a band called “Interina,” made up of foreign students studying in the capital. The uniqueness of the band’s repertoire was that it consisted primarily of Ukrainian songs. Under Volodymyr's guidance, the band won the National Contest of Young Performers.

In the early 1970s, Volodymyr became the editor of music programs on Ukrainian Radio. Concurrently, he studied by correspondence at the Institute of Culture in St. Petersburg (formerly Leningrad). During this period, he wrote a substantial number of poems and songs.

The collaboration with young composer and singer Evgen Martynov was very promising. Once, while strolling along the scenic bank of the Dnieper River, Volodymyr suggested, “Why don’t we write a song in Ukrainian, and you perform it?” This led to the creation of a new song, “Kolyory Kohannya.” The friends had many other exciting projects planned; however, these were left unrealized due to Martynov's sudden death.

In 1979, Kudryavtsev partnered with Pavlo Dvorsky, who was then the lead singer of the band “Smerichka” and had just begun his career as a composer. Together, they wrote the song “Stozhary,” which became a hit in Ukraine when performed by Nazariy Yaremchuk.

Partnerships with authors such as Pavlo Dvorsky, Olexander Zuev, Borys Monastyrsky, Olexander Bilash, Igor Shamo, Mykola Mozgovy, Olexiy Semenov, Volodymyr Yartsev, Volodymyr Ivasyuk, Levko Dutkovsky, Stepan Sabadash, and Ivan Golyak resulted in numerous hits. Volodymyr's songs were performed on Ukrainian radio and TV by artists including Nazariy Yaremchuk, Vasyl Zinkevych, Sofia Rotaru, Lilya Sandulesa, Lina Prohorova, Tamara Miansarova, Radmila Karaklajich, Evgen Martynov, Ala Kudlay, and Nadiya Chepraga, as well as by popular Ukrainian bands such as “Kobza,” “Vodogray,” “Charivni Hitary,” “Plamya,” and “Kalyna.”

The period from the late 1980s to the mid-1990s was filled with new projects and political activism. When a wave of national consciousness for independence swept through Ukraine, Volodymyr joined the "RUH" political movement. Later, while living in Crimea, he became fascinated with the idea of creating a memorial complex called "Montedor." This future museum was intended to highlight the activities of prominent artistic figures from Ukraine and other countries during their time in Crimea. He had already gathered many interesting materials about Lesya Ukrayinka, Adam Mickiewicz, Alexander Pushkin, and Vasily Zhukovsky. The idea was supported by officials in Kyiv; however, due to insufficient funding, the project was discontinued. In the 1990s, Volodymyr collaborated with the Black Sea band ensemble, writing lyrics, poems, and essays. Local media, particularly The Patriot of the Fatherland, frequently referenced his work.

The artistic career of Volodymyr Kudryavtsev was severely affected by a series of misfortunes and family dramas that began to creep into his life, impacting his health and leading to drinking problems. By 2000, he was practically broke. Thanks to the help of his friends, the poet found a home at the Natalya Uzhviy House of Veterans of the Stage in Kyiv, where he lived for the last six years of his life.

The media also expressed interest in his hardships and published several controversial articles, some of which were not based on verified facts. Volodymyr Kudryavtsev also appeared a few times on TV shows, including “Life after Glory” and “Interviews with Dvorsky.” His songs were once again performed by modern Ukrainian artists, such as Taisiya Povaliy, Mariya Yaremchuk, Viktor Pavlik, and others. The hit “A My u Dvoh” was revitalized into a video clip with a humorous plot, performed by Valeriy Leontyev and Viktor Gordon.

The last years of his life were primarily devoted to restoring the poems he had created during his lifetime. Unfortunately, this project remains unfinished.

== Personal life ==
Volodymyr Kudryavtsev met his first wife, Raisa, in Sakhalin while serving in the army. They got married in 1956 and moved to the town of Shakhty in the Rostov region. In 1957, they welcomed a daughter, Natalia. A few years later, their marriage ended. Volodymyr then met Halyna, who lived in Chișinău (Moldova), and moved in with her. In 1961, the couple had a daughter, Lyudmila; however, this second marriage also did not last long.

His mother, Hanna Denisovna, had always been his mainstay and supported him financially whenever he was in dire straits. She wanted to see more stability in her son's personal life. In 1962, she invited Natalia to Kyiv and helped raise her.

In 1964, Volodymyr met his third wife, Valerbina. After a few days of dating, they got married and settled in Kyiv. In 1966, the couple had a daughter, Lesya. Natalia and Lesya grew up together, with their grandmother, Hanna Denisovna, spending a lot of time with the girls. Although Volodymyr tried to contribute more time to the family, the chaotic pace of his lifestyle strained his relationship with Valerbina, and they divorced in 1970.

During his visits to St. Petersburg (formerly Leningrad), Volodymyr was romantically linked to singer Tamara Miansarova. However, the intense touring schedule of the singer hindered a more stable relationship. In 1971, Volodymyr married for the fourth time, to Tamara, who soon died from a serious illness. He began developing a habit of drinking. In 1973, he fell from a balcony and ended up in the hospital. After multiple operations, he was able to walk again but had to wear an orthopedic corset for a long time. In 1977, he brought his daughter Lyudmila from Chișinău to Kyiv, where she stayed with him for a few years.

Living in a certain environment, Volodymyr couldn't resist the temptations of show business and became involved in romantic relationships with many women. During his stay in Italy, he met Diana Liberatori, with whom he had a son, Voldemar. Their relationship ended after he returned to Kyiv. Many years later, he tried to find Diana and Voldemar, but to no avail.

1979 was a disastrous year in the poet's life. His daughter Natalia's little girl, Hannusya, tragically died. This event deeply affected Volodymyr and continued to haunt him for the rest of his life. His mother, Hanna Denisovna, could not cope with the tragedy and died two weeks later.

Little by little, he began to regain his senses. In 1981, Volodymyr married Inna. In 1982, the couple moved to Yalta (Crimea) and rented rooms in a mansion that had formerly belonged to a count, located within the grounds of the Nikitsky Botanical Gardens. It was here that Inna conceived the idea of researching the mansion's history, which in turn led to the start of the “Montedor” project.

His last marriage was to Oksana, whom he married in 1986. They lived in Yalta and stayed together for approximately 11 years. After their divorce, he lost his rights to the real estate they had owned together.

On his way back to Kyiv, he lost his passport, and due to some unfavorable circumstances, he also lost his property in Kyiv. His daughter Natalia tried to help him restore his rights, but it didn't work out. Volodymyr became addicted to alcohol, entering another difficult period in his life that took a tremendous toll on his health and career. He checked into a hospital, where he met his former friend, Dr. Ivan Kharchuk. Together with Les Tanyuk, they helped Volodymyr secure lodging at the Natalya Uzhviy House of Veterans of the Stage in Kyiv.

Broke, disappointed, and in despair, the poet attempted to commit suicide; however, his new friend, Mykola Oleynchuk, a former actor of the Uzhhorod Drama Theatre, saved him. They became close friends. His old friends, Pavlo Dvorsky, Yuriy Rozhkov, and others also came to visit and support him. Additionally, his daughters reconnected with their father and reconciled.

During the last year of his life, Volodymyr was suffering from cancer.
