= Chervona Ruta (film) =

1971 film directed by Roman Oleksiv

- Sofia Rotaru and Vasyl Zinkevych
- Ukrainian: Червона рута
- Directed by: Roman Oleksiv
- Written by: Miroslav Skochilyas; Roman Oleksiv
- Produced by: Roman Oleksiv
- Starring: Sofia Rotaru; Vasyl Zinkevych; Nazariy Yaremchuk; Raisa Koltsa
- Music by: Volodymyr Ivasyuk; Levko Dutkivskiy; Valeriy Hromtsev; Eduard Kolmanovsky; Myroslav Skoryk; Oleksandr Bilash
- Distributed by: Ukrtelefilm
- Release date: 1971
- Running time: 45 minutes
- Countries: USSR; Ukrainian SSR
- Languages: Ukrainian; Russian (dubbed)

Chervona Ruta (Russian: «Червона рута», romanized: Chervona Ruta, from Ukrainian: Червона рута, lit. 'red rue') is a 1971 Soviet musical film written by Miroslav Skochilyas and directed by Roman Oleksiv, starring Sofia Rotaru and Vasyl Zinkevych alongside popular Soviet Ukrainian ensembles.

Regarded as one of the first modern Soviet musical films, and the first modern Ukrainian musical filmed in Bukovina and the Carpathian mountains in the Ukrainian SSR, Chervona Ruta features short dialogues combined with legendary pop-folk songs in the Ukrainian language and characteristic Western Ukraine dances in modern pop choreography. The film was released in both a Ukrainian and a Russian language version, though in both versions all but one of the songs are in Ukrainian.

In 2016, BBC News Ukrainian wrote that Chervona ruta "popularised Ukrainian songs in a time of Brezhnev's Russification".

== Plot ==
Oksana (played by Sofia Rotaru) is a young and beautiful Carpathian girl. On the "Donetsk-Verkhovyna" train she becomes acquainted with a young miner from Donetsk called Boris. The travellers fall in love, but are parted when they arrive at their destination. In the Carpathian Mountains their paths diverge, but Boris (played by Vasyl Zinkevych, soloist of the instrumental band "Smerichka") discovers where she is staying. The couple meet again and rekindle their love. Their friends invite them to perform in a concert for vacationers at a mountain resort, where they sing about their feelings for each other.

== Cast ==
=== Cast according to the credits ===
- VIA Rosinka
- VIA Smerichka
- VIA Karpaty
- VIA Evrika

Soloists:

- Sofia Rotar as Oksana
- Vasyl Zinkevych as Boris
- Raisa Koltsa
- Nazariy Yaremchuk

=== Uncredited ===
- Volodymyr Ivasyuk
- Levko Dutkivskiy
- Anatoliy Yevdokymenko
- Alla Dutkovska
- Mariya Isak

== Production ==
=== Development and casting ===
The idea to make a movie about Ukrainian pop-folk culture set in the Carpathian mountains arose from the fame of the VIA Smerichka and the popularity of the song "Chervona ruta" by Volodymyr Ivasyuk in the Soviet Union. The original idea was to make a movie about Smerichka. However, the scenario was changed to a simple plot about a sudden blaze of love between Boris, an unsophisticated miner, and the Bukovinian beauty Oksana.

26-year-old Vasyl Zinkevych from Smerichka was cast as Boris over 19-year-old Nazariy Yaremchuk. As there was no female lead singer in Smerichka, Sofia Rotaru was suggested for the part. Initially, Smerichka singer Mariya Isak had been considered for the female role, but in the end, she was not cast as the producers preferred Rotaru. By 1971, Sofia Rotaru was already a well-known singer in Bukovina both for her pop-folk songs and for her victory at the 1968 International Song Festival in Bulgaria.

Two Smerichka members had been excluded from filming because they wore beards.

Other personnel that worked on the film, included:

- Director producer: Roman Oleksiv
- Scenario: M.Skochilyas, Roman Oleksiv
- Sound operator: Vasyl Strykhovych
- Caneraman: A. Derbinyan
- Director's assistant: A. Savchenko
- Cameraman's assistant: A. Ermolichik
- Montage: V. Chernousova, N. Kovali
- Editor: T. Derzkaya
- Director: B. Dubitskiy

=== Filming ===
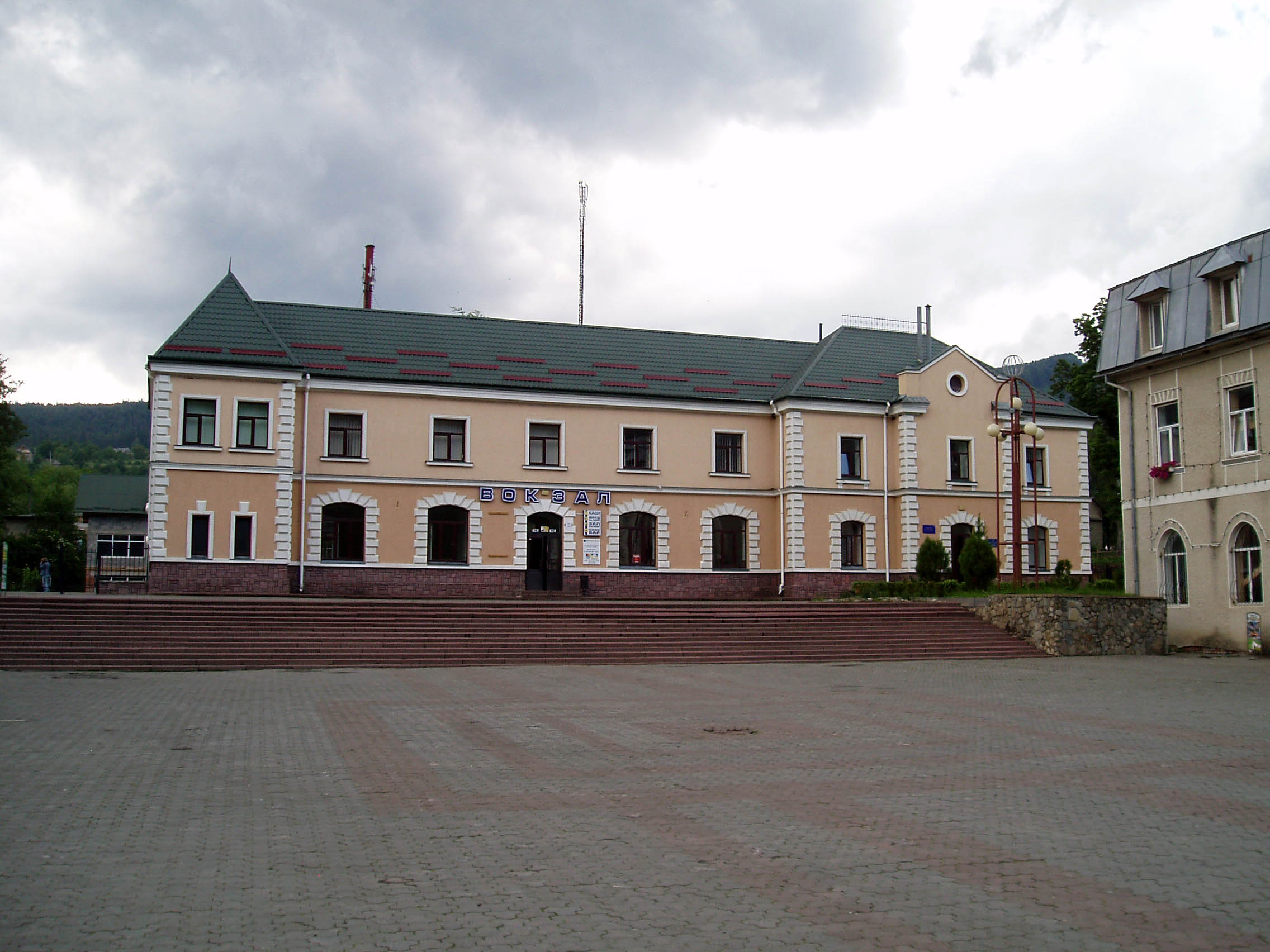
Yaremche Railway Station, where Zinkevych descends the stairs before the title credits are shown.

The initial filming of Chervona ruta took place in August 1971 in Yaremche, Ivano-Frankivsk Oblast. The spectators of the concert in the film were actually holiday-makers in Yaremche that came to curiously watch the filming and performances.

During the filming, the crew and artists stayed in leftover rooms in homes in the village of Dora, nowadays part of Yaremche. During the filming, it became clear that Sofia Rotaru did not own the right clothes to fit into the pop-folk style of the film, and as a result, Vasyl Zinkevych was sent for Vyzhnytsia to collect one of Alla Dutkosvka's dresses.

During the film, the mother of Nazariy Yaremchuk passed away. Initially, it was unknown whether Yaremchuk would be able to complete filming due to Hutsul mourning customs. Eventually, Yaremchuk managed to complete filming.

=== Music ===
The music from the film came from popular local amateur music ensembles. In the film, Sofia sang "U Karpatakh hodyt' osin'", a song that was normally performed by Smerichka, but had been lent to Rotaru by Levko Dutkovskiy. All of the songs were recorded by sound operator Vasyl Strikhovych.

The recording of "Vodohray" by the tenor Vasyl and the alto Sofia was not used in the final version of the film. Instead Nazariy Yaremchuk's voice was dubbed in place of Vasyl Zinkevych, and Mariya Isak's voice was dubbed in place of Sofia Rotaru in the song. It appears that the original performance had a defective soundtrack. In the film Mariya Isak appears fifth in the row of five girls, for a couple of seconds.

Songs performed
No.	Title	Lyrics	Music	Notes	Length
1.	"Na shvydkykh poyizdakh" (performed by Vasyl Zinkevych, and VIA Rosinka)	Volodymyr Ivasyuk	Volodymyr Ivasyuk
2.	"Nichiya" (performed by VIA Rosinka)	Stepan Pushyk	Ruslan Ishchuk
3.	"V ruky my berem svoyi dzvinki hitary" (performed by VIA Karpaty)	Viktor Kuryachenkov	Valeriy Hromtsev	Used for displaying title credits
4.	"Mila moya" (performed by Vasyl Zinkevych, Nazariy Yaremchuk, and VIA Smerichka)	Volodymyr Ivasyuk	Volodymyr Ivasyuk
5.	"Zalysheni kviti" (performed by Vasyl Zinkevych, and VIA Smerichka)	Volodymyr Ivasyuk	Valeriy Hromtsev
6.	"Vodohray" (performed by Nazariy Yaremchuk, Mariya Isak, and VIA Smerichka)	Volodymyr Ivasyuk	Volodymyr Ivasyuk	Playbacked in the film by Vasyl Zinkevych and Sofia Rotaru
7.	"Nezrivyanyy svit krasy" (performed by Nazariy Yaremchuk, and VIA Smerichka)	Anatoliy Fartushnyak	Levko Dutkovskiy
8.	"Bezhit reka" (Raisa Koltsa)	Yehven Yevtushenko	Eduard Kolmanovsky
9.	"Tantsyuye ansambl' "Evrika"" (performed by Evrika)
10.	"O, sizokrylyy ptakh" (performed by Sofia Rotaru)	Roman Kudlyk	Don Backy
11.	"Chervona ruta" (performed by Vasyl Zinkevych, Nazariy Yaremchuk, and VIA Smerichka)	Volodymyr Ivasyuk	Volodymyr Ivasyuk
12.	"Namalyuy meni nich" (performed by Sofia Rotaru)	Mykola Petrenko	Myroslav Skoryk
13.	"Vidlitayut' zhuravli" (performed by VIA Rosinka)	Valeriy Huzhva	Oleksandr Bilash
14.	"U Karpatakh khodyt' osin'" (performed by Sofia Rotaru, and VIA Smerichka)	Anatoliy Fartushnyak	Levko Dutkosvkiy
15.	"Lystya zhovkne voseny" (performed by VIA Rosinka, and VIA Karpaty)	Mykola Buchko	Valeriy Hromtsev	Used as end credits

== Impact ==
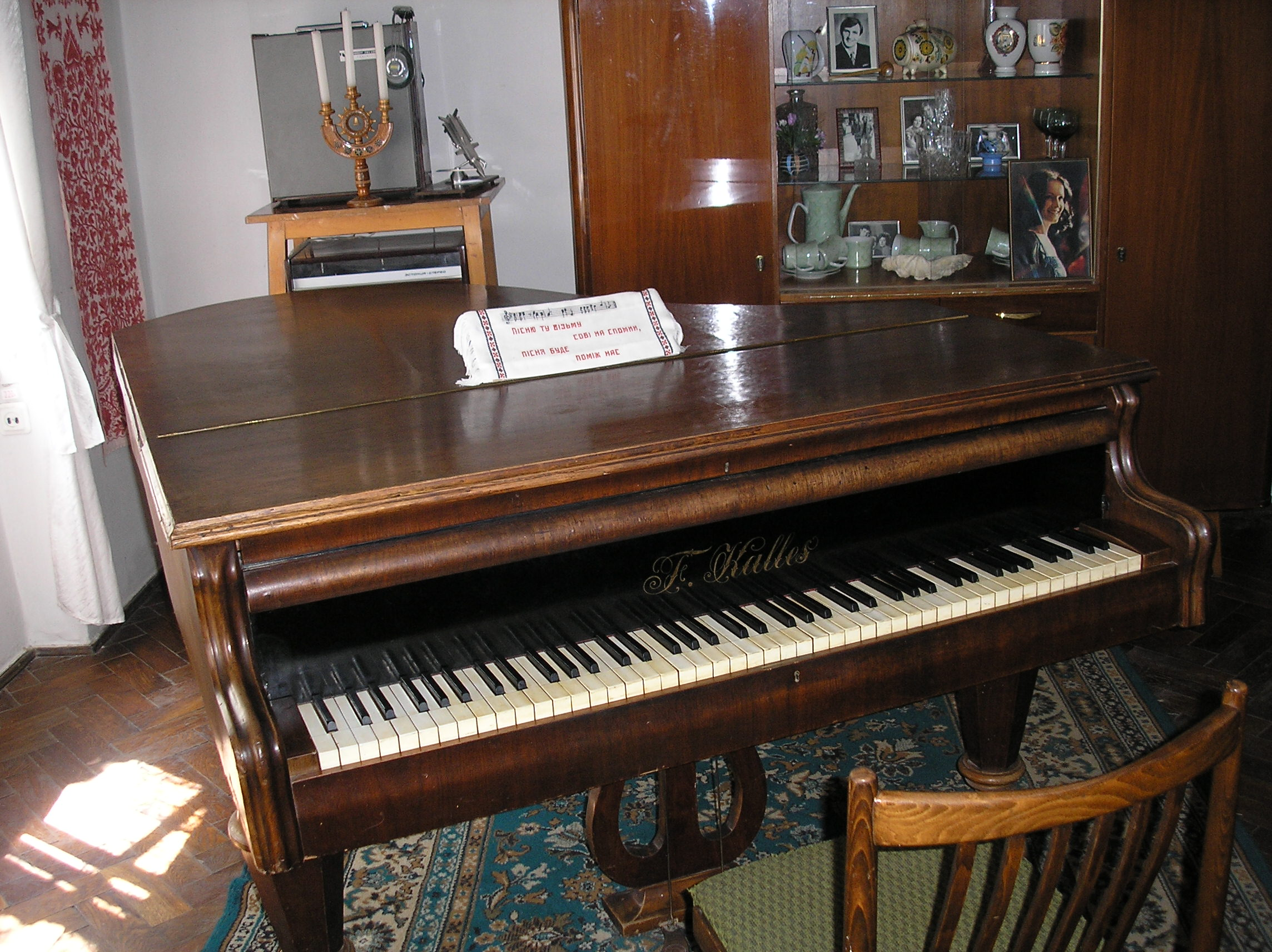
Piano in the Volodymyr Ivasyuk Museum in Chernivtsi. Some of the Chervona ruta songs were composed on that piano.

Chervona ruta unexpectedly became a hit film and is nowadays considered to be a cult film in Ukraine. The title song "Chervona ruta" was performed by Vasyl Zinkevych, Nazariy Yaremchuk and Volodymyr Ivasyuk at the first Pesnya goda in Moscow in late 1971. A year later at Pesnya goda, Nazariy Yaremchuk, Myroslava Ezherenko and VIA Smerichka performed "Vodohray", while Yaremchuk and Zinkevych performed a very short version of "Chervona ruta".

In 2016, BBC News Ukrainian wrote that Chervona ruta "popularised Ukrainian songs in a time of Brezhnev's Russification".

After the death of Ivasyuk in 1979, the film was said to be denounced by the Soviet authorities and tapes of the film (especially those in the Ukrainian version) were destroyed. In 2014, a recording in Ukrainian was uploaded by the project Golden Fund of Ukrainian Artistry on YouTube.

=== Sequels ===
In 1981, ten years after the release of the film, a sequel titled Chervona ruta: 10 rokiv potomu was released on Ukrainian television. In this film, Vasyl Zinkevych and Nazariy Yaremchuk discuss the impact that the film had on their lives. Next to that, the film shows performances of Zinkevych and Yaremchuk, as well as Sofia Rotaru and VIA Smerichka. Volodymyr Ivasyuk, who contributed heavily to the original film, was only mentioned once.

In 2019, it was announced that Ukrainian producer Nataliya Yaksymovych was planning to create a modern version of the film, titled Chervona ruta: Nova istoriya. The film would be a romantic comedy, using the vast body of Ivasyuk's songs. The sequel was pitched as a story about a young and shy Carpathian girl who goes on a journey across Ukraine.
