= Kuty =

Rural locality in Ivano-Frankivsk Oblast, Ukraine

Kuty Кути
- Rural settlement
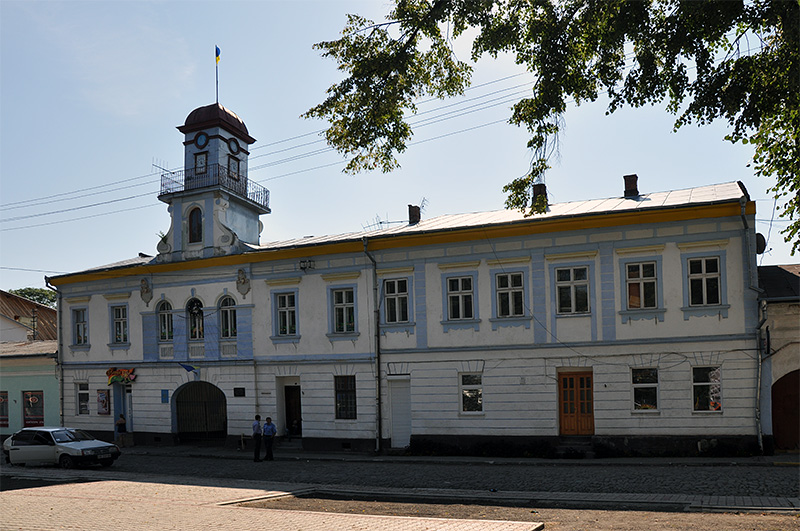
- Kuty town hall

- Coat of arms
- Interactive map of Kuty
- Location of Kuty in Ukraine Kuty (Ukraine)
- Coordinates: 48°15′26″N 25°10′2″E
- Country: Ukraine
- Oblast: Ivano-Frankivsk Oblast
- Raion: Kosiv Raion
- First mentioned: 1469
- Town rights: 1715

Government
  - mayor: Dmytro Pavliuk

Area
  - Total: 49 km^{2} (19 sq mi)

Population (2022)
  - Total: 4,001
- Time zone: EET

Kuty (Ukrainian: Кути; Polish: Kuty; German: Kutten; Romanian: Cuturi), also known historically as Kitów (Yiddish: קיטעוו, romanized: Kitev, German: Kitau), is a rural settlement in Kosiv Raion, Ivano-Frankivsk Oblast, western Ukraine. It is situated on the Cheremosh River. It is one of the historical centres of the ancient region of Pokuttia, the name of which may derive from the township. The current population estimate is 4,001 (2022 estimate). Kuty hosts the administration of Kuty settlement hromada, one of the hromadas of Ukraine, which consists of Kuty township and 6 villages.

Kuty is often associated with Kitów, Poland, as both settlements have historic familial connections, both communities suffered the destruction of their Jews during the Holocaust, both are the originators of the Kitowski surname, and the two towns share a placename in Polish.

== History ==
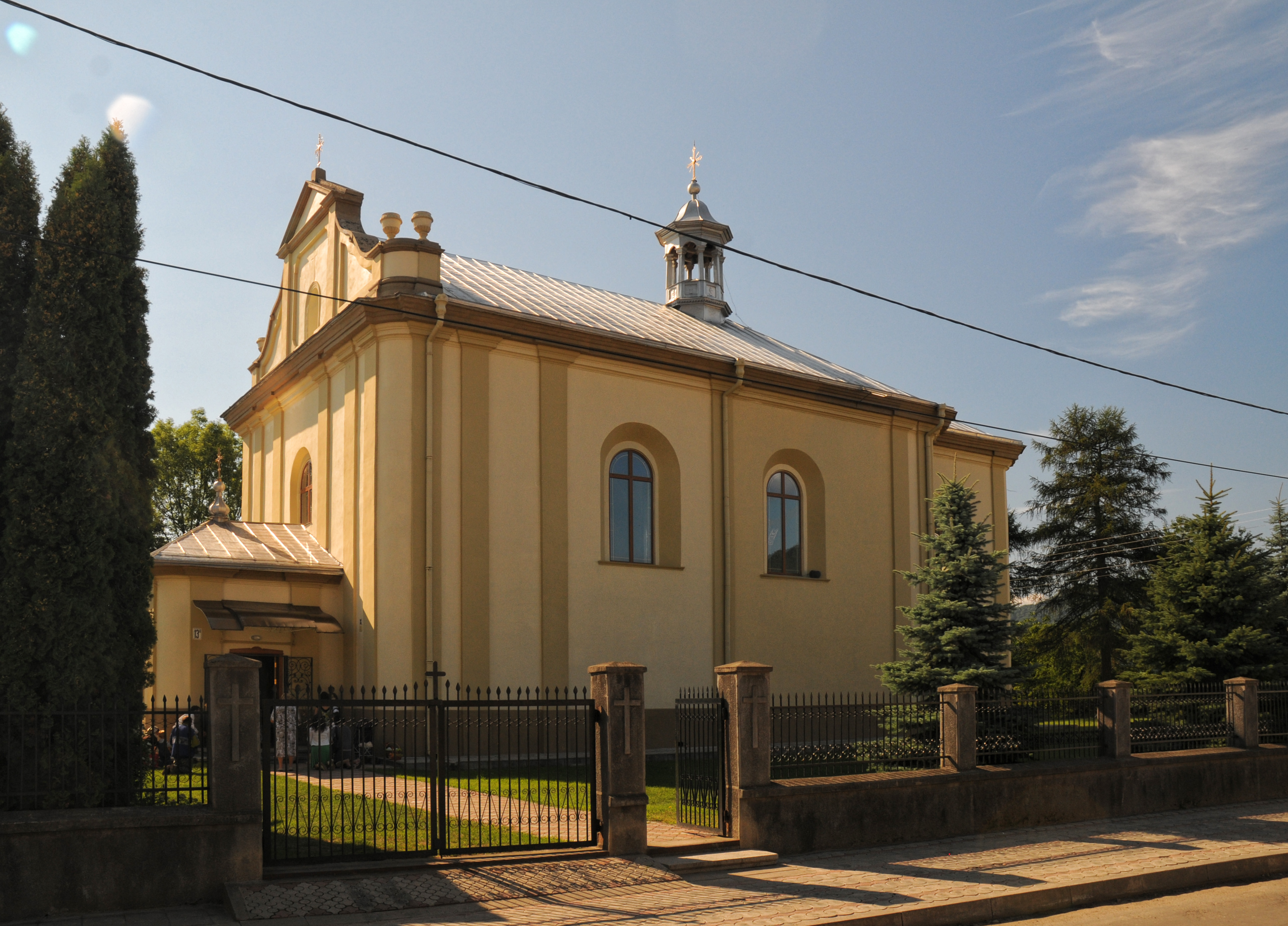
Armenian church

Kuty, which means 'angles' or 'corners' in Ukrainian, was first mentioned in records of 1469 as a village in the estate of Jan Odrowąż, then Polish archbishop of Lwów (now Lviv) and personal adviser to several Polish kings. Over time the settlement grew and in 1715 at the request of Jan Potocki, the voivod of Kiev, King Augustus II the Strong granted it a town charter. Two churches were founded for local Uniates and Armenian Catholics. With expansion and the proximity of Bukovina, the town became the seat of a starost in the region of Halych and an administrative centre within the Ruthenian Voivodship in the Lesser Poland Province of the Polish–Lithuanian Commonwealth. The town was the fiefdom of the Potocki family until the partitions of Poland. Kuty had a mixed population of Poles, Ruthenians, Jews and Armenians.

In 1772 it came under Austrian administration and on May 1, 1782, Kuty lost its town privileges. As a result, its economic growth halted and Kuty remained a provincial backwater inhabited mostly by Jewish and Armenian merchants. Around 1850 the town was linked to the rest of Galicia by the Kołomyja-Czerniowce railway. However, as both Galicia and Bukovina were under Austrian rule, it could not capitalize on its status as a border town. From the 19th-century onwards, Kuty acquired fame as a holiday resort owing to its picturesque location, on a river surrounded by hills and blessed with a balmy climate. It was known as a fruit-growing area and associated festivals. It was home to the largest Armenian community in Poland, many of whom had settled there from Moldavia. The local Armenian school operated until the 1860s as the only one that was not dissolved by the Austrian authorities shortly after the Partitions of Poland.

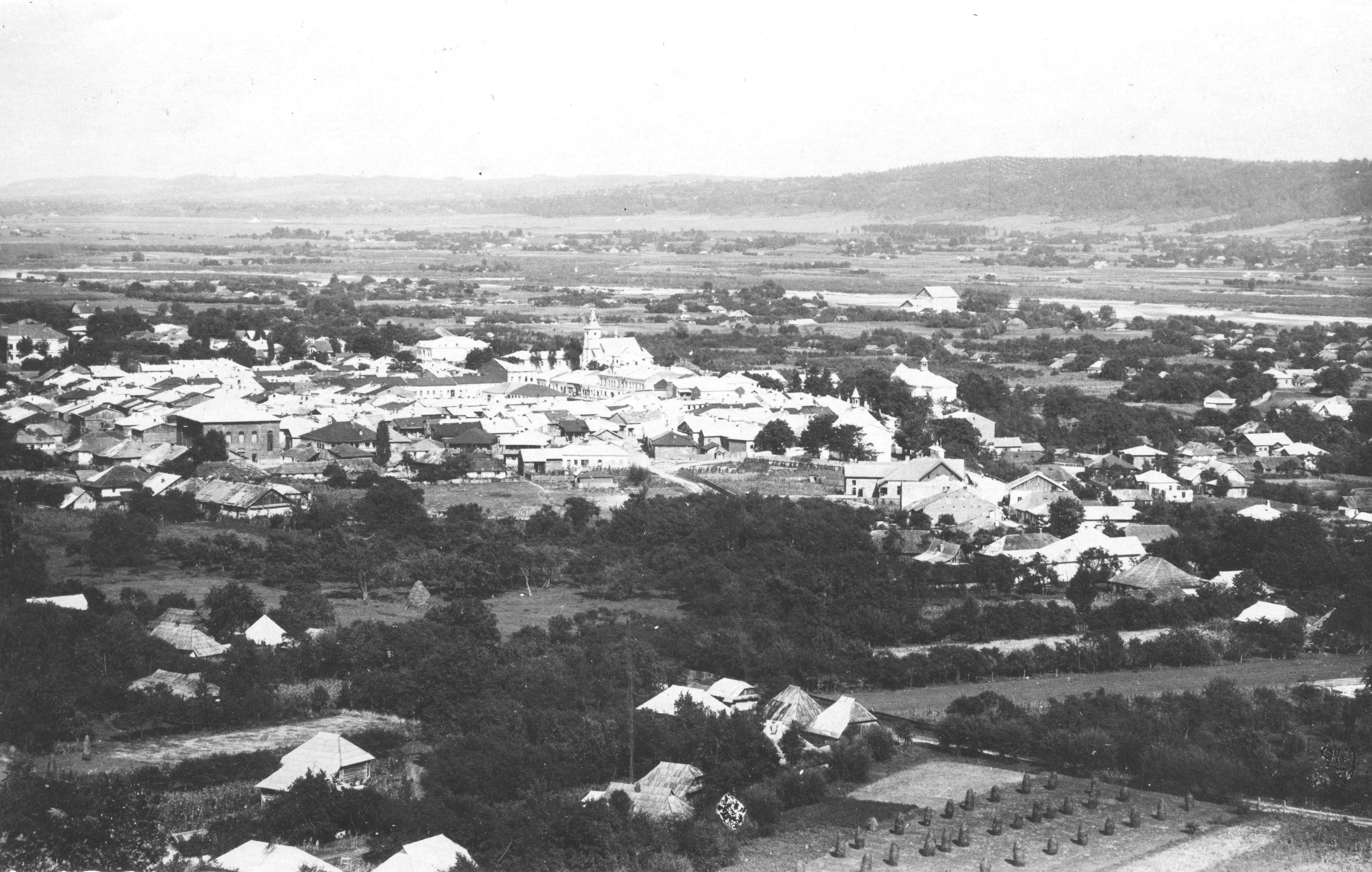
Kuty in the interbellum

After the collapse of the Central Powers in 1918 the town was briefly under the control of the West Ukrainian People's Republic. After seizure by Romania, Kuty returned to newly independent Polish administration. It became the most important border crossing between Poland and Romania. In 1930 the Polish Army built a new wooden bridge across the Cheremosh river.

It was in Kuty that the Polish president, Ignacy Mościcki, spent his last days in Poland before crossing the border into exile during the 1939 Polish Defensive War against the Germans and the Soviets attacking on two fronts at the start of World War II. The town was defended by the Polish Army until September 20, 1939. Among the last soldiers to be killed by the Red Army in heavy fighting for the bridge was the notable Polish writer, Tadeusz Dołęga-Mostowicz. Except for the term of German occupation between 1941 and 1944, Kuty was annexed by the USSR in 1939 and was administered by Soviet Ukraine. Some Poles from Kuty were murdered by the Soviet NKVD in Kuty and in the Katyn massacre. In the spring of 1942, during the German occupation, the entire Jewish population of Kuty was killed by the Germans and Ukrainian Auxiliary Police, with some 950 to 1,038 Jews massacred on 10 April 1942 alone. Many died in the town while the rest were rounded up and deported to the ghetto in Kolomyia. Only a handful survived. In March–April 1944, Ukrainian nationalists killed about 200 Poles and Armenians, including women and children. Following the annexation of Kuty from Poland by the Soviet Union at the end of World War II, surviving Poles and Armenians mostly left for Poland. The tradition of baking kołacz of Armenians of Kuty is still cultivated in Poland, and it is designated a traditional food by the Ministry of Agriculture and Rural Development of Poland.

Since 1991 Kuty has been part of independent Ukraine.

Until 26 January 2024, Kuty was designated urban-type settlement. On this day, a new law entered into force which abolished this status, and Kuty became a rural settlement.

== Demography ==
In 1849 the town had roughly 3,700 inhabitants, in 1880, 6,300 and in the late 1920s – 8,000. Of these 3,300 were Jews, 1,900 Hutsuls, 1,300 Poles and over 500 Armenians. In 2001, the population was 4,272, and in 2016 ca. 4,085 (2016 est.).

== Notable residents ==
- Edmund Charaszkiewicz (1895–1975), Polish intelligence officer
- Eliasz Kuziemski (1922–2000), Polish actor
- Vira Vovk (1926–2022), Ukrainian writer
- Abraham Gershon of Kitov (1701–1761), rabbi
- Haim Drukman (1932–2022), rabbi and educator, Israeli politician
- Levko Dutkivskiy (born 1943), musician and composer, founder and leader of the vocal-instrumental ensemble "Smerichka" which included legendary artists Volodymyr Ivasiuk, Nazariy Yaremchuk and Vasyl Zinkevych. People's Artist of Ukraine, director, teacher, one of the founders of Ukrainian pop music.
