= Vyzhnytsia =

City in Chernivtsi Oblast, Ukraine

Vyzhnytsia Вижниця
- City
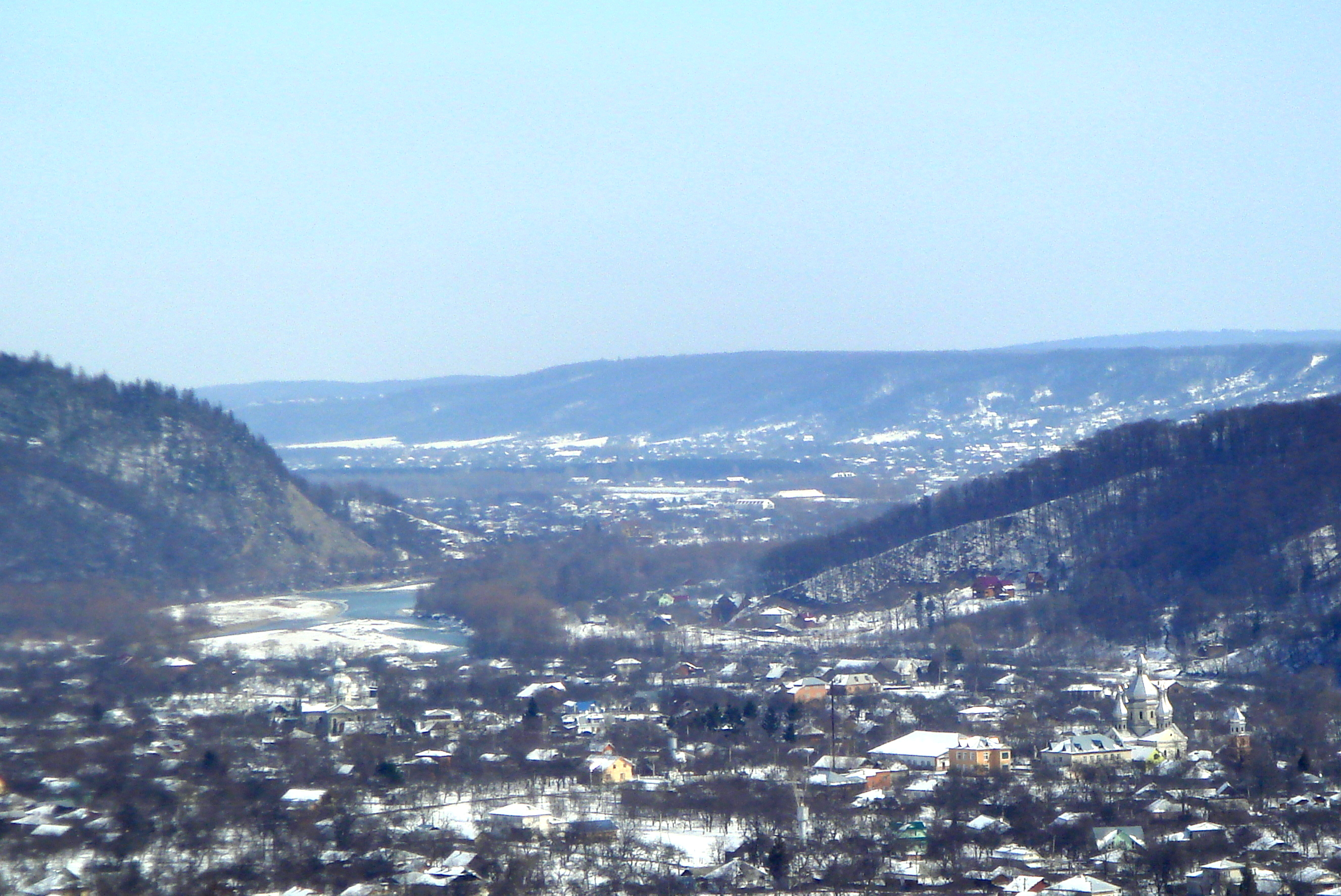
- View of the city

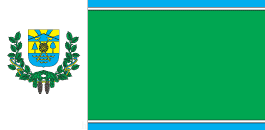
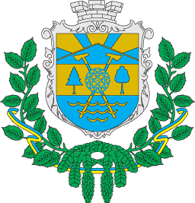
- Flag Coat of arms

- Location within Ukraine Vyzhnytsia (Ukraine)
- Coordinates: 48°15′0″N 25°11′30″E
- Country: Ukraine
- Oblast: Chernivtsi Oblast
- District: Vyzhnytsia Raion
- Hromada: Vyzhnytsia urban hromada
- First mentioned: 1158

Government
  - Mayor: Alex G. Chepil

Area
  - Land: 9 km^{2} (3.5 sq mi)
- Elevation: 356 m (1,168 ft)

Population (2022)
  - Total: 3,803
- Demonym: Vyzhnytsian
- Zip Code: 59200
- Area code: +380-3730
- Website: vnmiscrada.gov.ua

Vyzhnytsia (/ˈvɪʒnɪts(j)ə/; Ukrainian: Вижниця, IPA: [ˈwɪʒnɪtsʲɐ]; German: Wischnitz; Polish: Wyżnica; Romanian: Vijnița; Russian: Вижница, romanized: Vizhnitsa; Bukovinian (dialect of ukrainian): Віжница; Yiddish: וויזשניץ, romanized: Vizhnitz) is a small resort city located at the foothills of Carpathian Mountains in the historical region of Bukovina, on the Cheremosh River in Chernivtsi Oblast of western Ukraine. It is the administrative center of Vyzhnytsia Raion. Vyzhnytsia hosts the administration of Vyzhnytsia urban hromada, one of the hromadas of Ukraine. Population: 3,803 (2022 estimate).

== History ==
While the city was probably mentioned as early as 1158, the first unequivocal mention comes in 1501 in a Moldavian chronicle. From 1514 to 1574 the area was occupied by the Turks, after which it belonged to the Principality of Moldova until 1774. From 1774 to 1918 it was part of the Austrian Empire (from 1849 part of the crown land of Bukovina). During that time it served as a district centre. Between 1908 and 1920 a Ukrainian gymnasium with 1500 students functioned in the town. In 1910 Vyzhnytsia had 5300 residents.

In 1918, the city and surrounding region came under Romanian rule, as part of the Union of Bukovina with Romania, placed under the jurisdiction of Storojineț County. By 1930 Vyzhnytsia's population had shrunk to 3800 inhabitants. King Carol II's administrative reforms of 1938 would shift boundaries again, placing the city within the newly-created Ținutul Suceava region.

As a result of the Molotov-Ribbentrop Pact, the Soviet Union annexed Northern Bukovina in 1940, and with it, the city of Vyzhnytsia. The occupation was short-lived; as part of the Axis invasion of the Soviet Union, Romanian forces retook the region in July 1941.

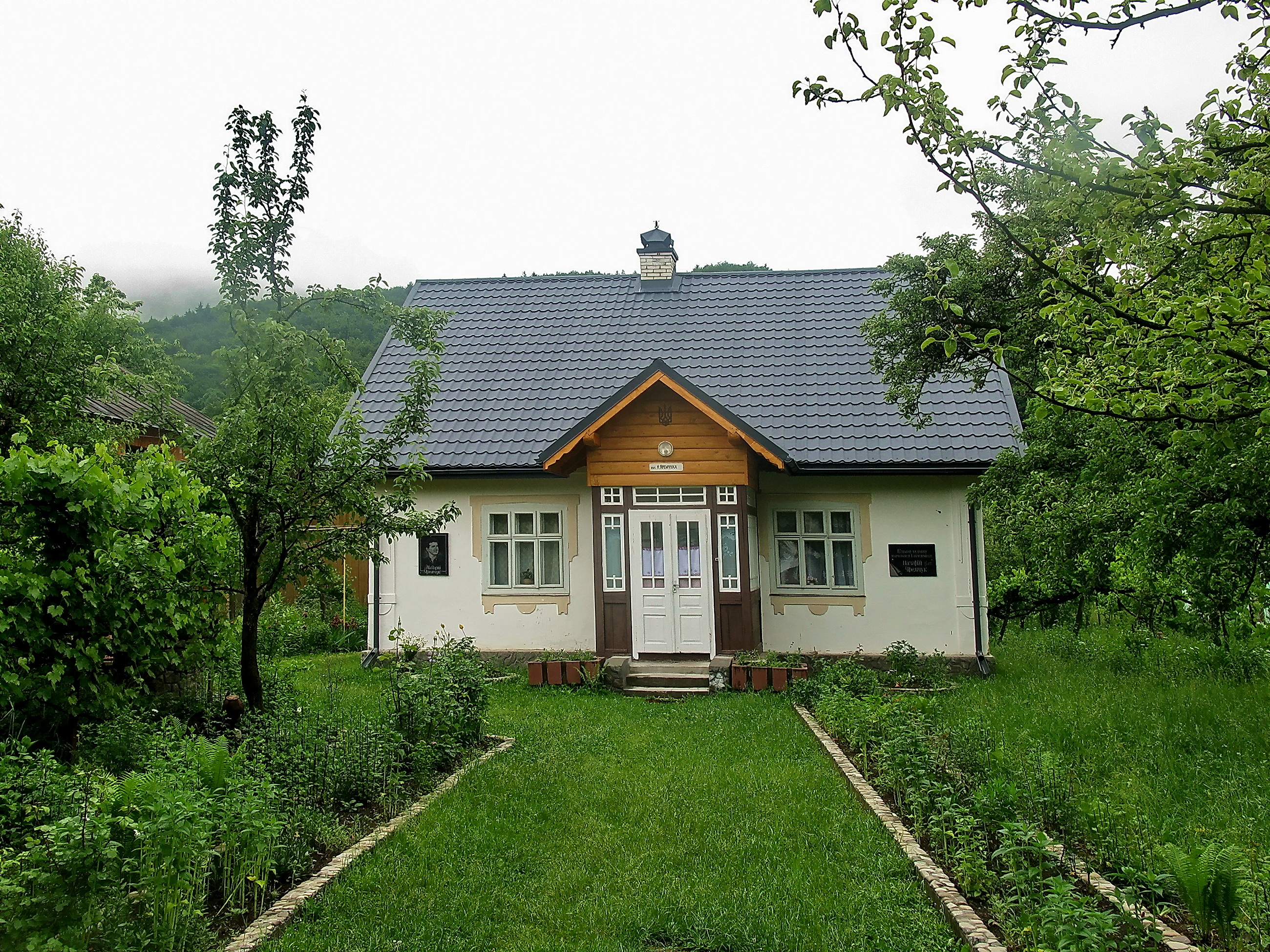
Nazariy Yaremchuk's native house in modern-day Vyzhnytsia

=== Part of Soviet Ukraine ===
Vyzhnytsa has been a city since 1940. The Bukovina region was taken by Soviet forces in 1944 and became a part of Soviet Ukraine.

A local newspaper has been published in the city since February 1945. During the Soviet times a Hutsul arts school functioned in the city.

In the late 1960s and early 1970s, Vyzhnytsa was the center of a flourishing Ukrainian-language music scene that was renowned all over the Soviet Union. The local house of culture was renowned for its parties with illegal Western pop music and attracted young people from as far as Chernivtsi. Volodymyr Ivasyuk was named as a regular visitor of these parties. There, he befriended musician Levko Dutkivskiy. Dutkivskiy from there on founded VIA Smerichka, with later Nazariy Yaremchuk and Vasyl Zinkevych as lead singers. Smerichka became one of Ukraine's most famous groups at the time, performing at Pesnya goda twice and winning Allo, my ishchem talanty! (Hello, we are looking for talents!) in 1972, one of the first Soviet television talent shows.

In January 1989 the population was 5708 people.

=== Part of modern Ukraine ===
In 2011 a security checkpoint "Vyzhnytsia" was built here.

In January 2013 the population was 4207 people.

=== Jewish history of the town ===
In Judaism, the town is known as having been the original center of the Hassidic sect bearing its Yiddish name (וויזשניץ Vizhnitz). The town's Jewish community was decimated in the Holocaust, with most either being killed on the spot or deported to Transnistria, where deportees were left to die in crude facilities. Most survivors did not return, but the flourishing Vizhnitz Hassidic community in Israel and the United States continues to keep the name.

== Transport and economy ==
Vyzhnytsia has a railway station of the Lviv Railways. It is a centre of forestry and wood industry.

== Notable people ==
- Josef Burg, writer
- Gerard Ciołek, architect
- Menachem Mendel Hager, first Vizhnitser Rebbe
- Nazariy Yaremchuk, singer
- Otto Preminger, director
- Dol Dauber, musician
- Meir Just, Dutch rabbi

== Gallery ==
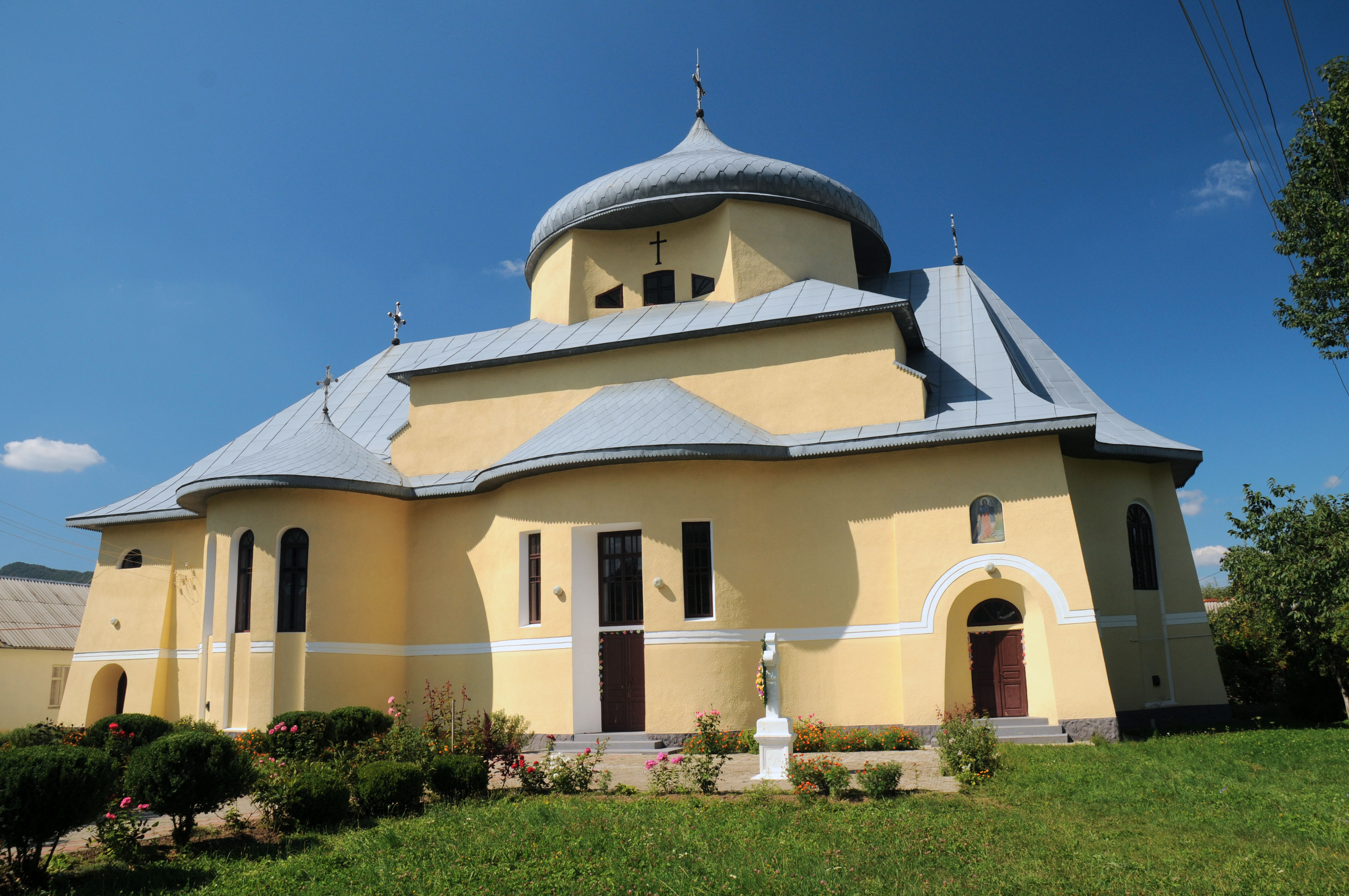
Saint Michael's Church

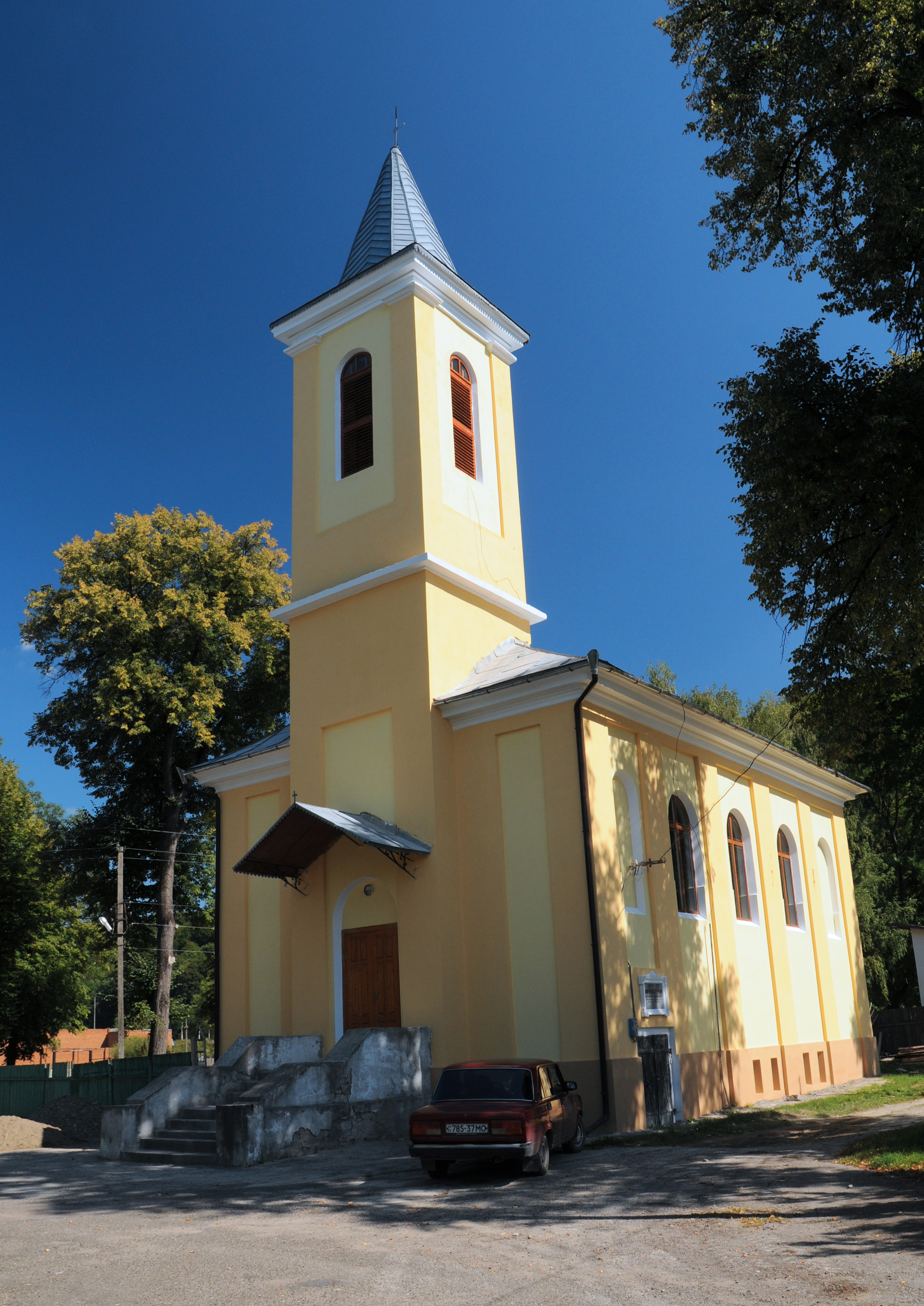
Saints Peter and Paul Catholic Church

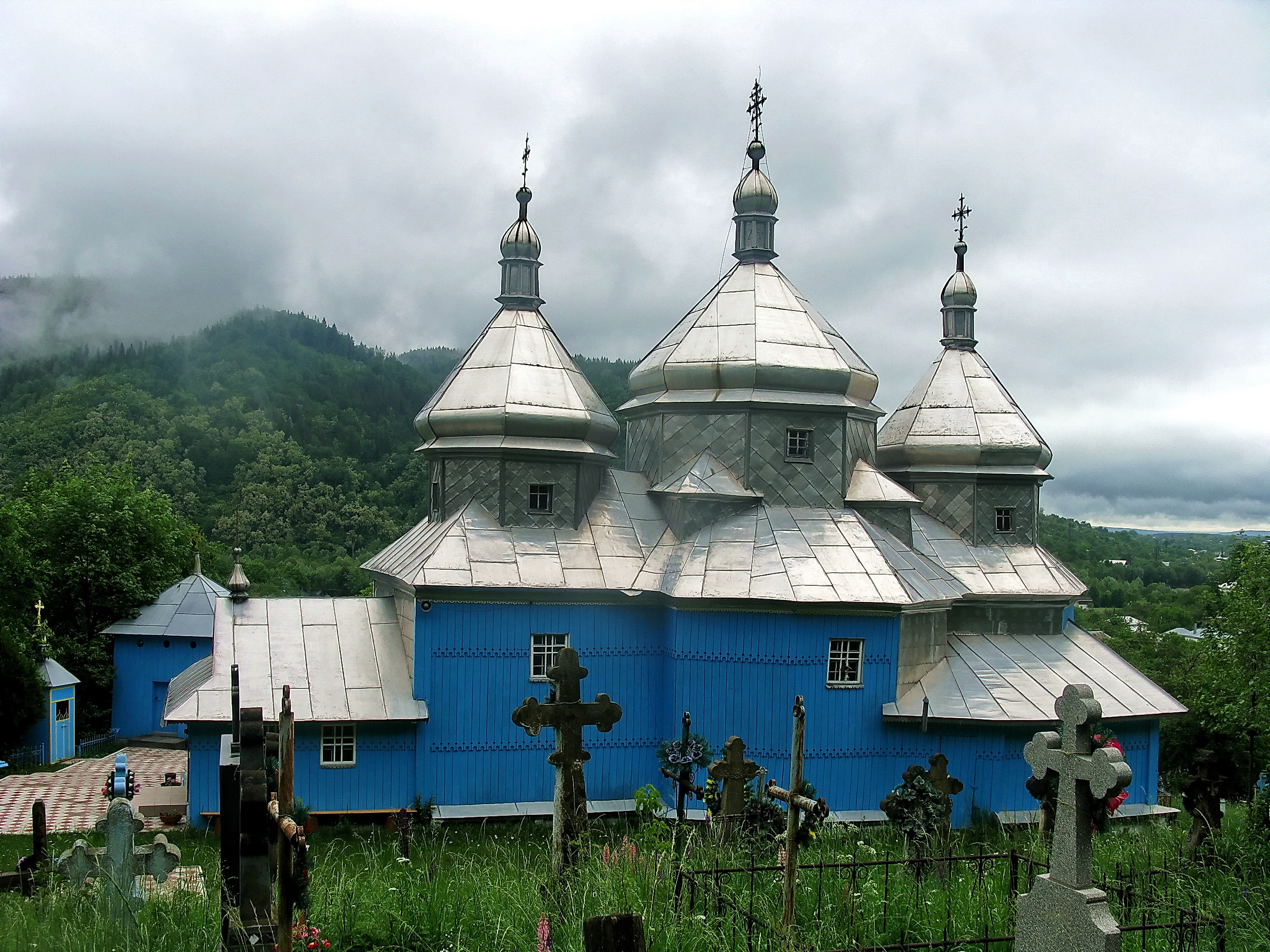
Saint Demetrius Church

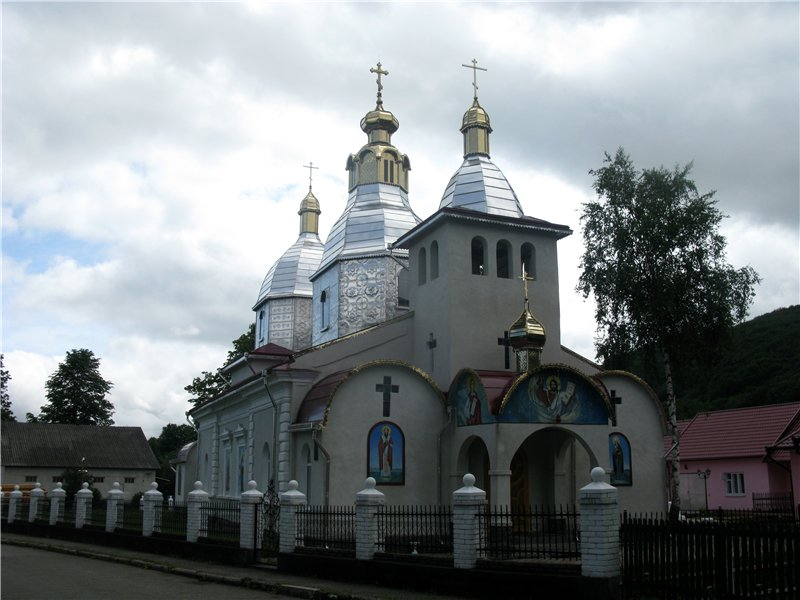
Holy Trinity Church

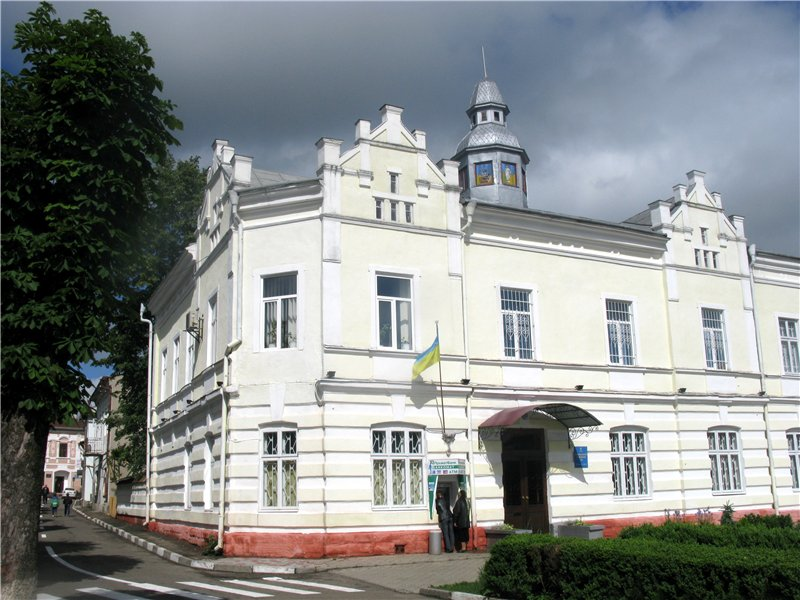
City Hall

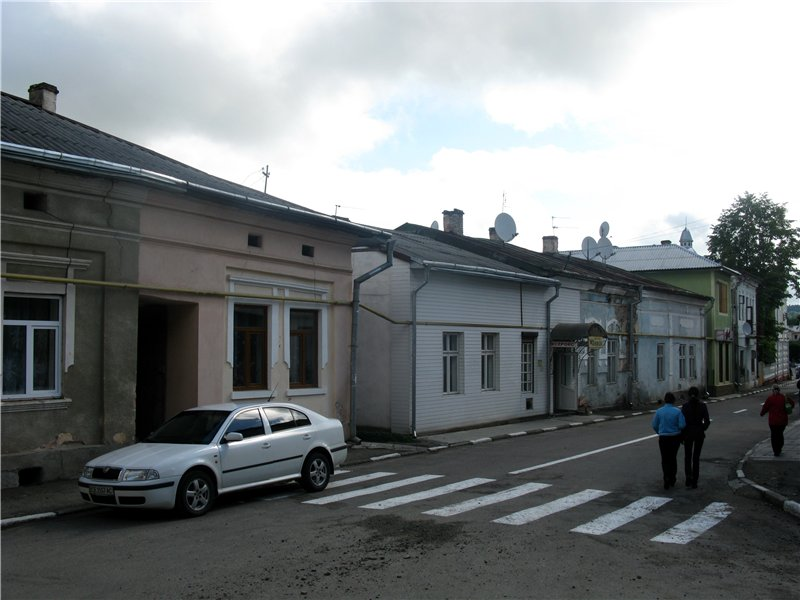
Old city of Vyzhnytsia

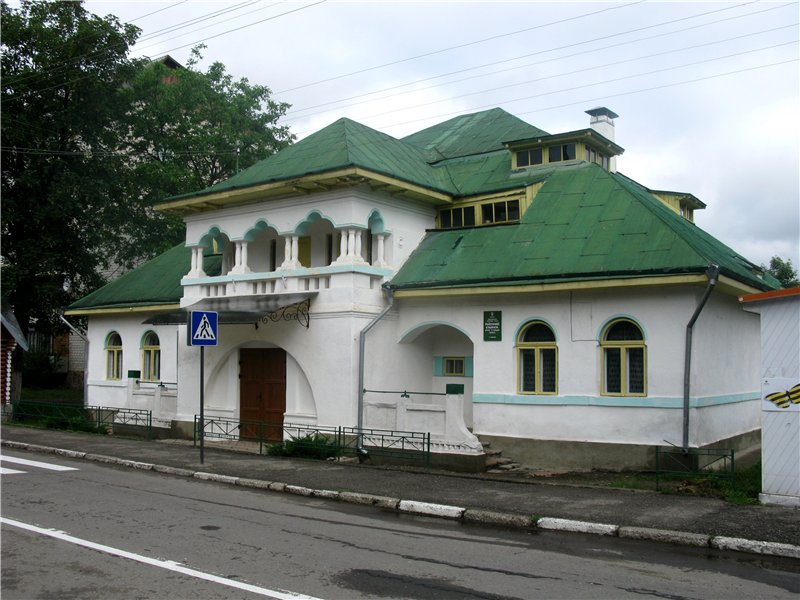
Children's art house

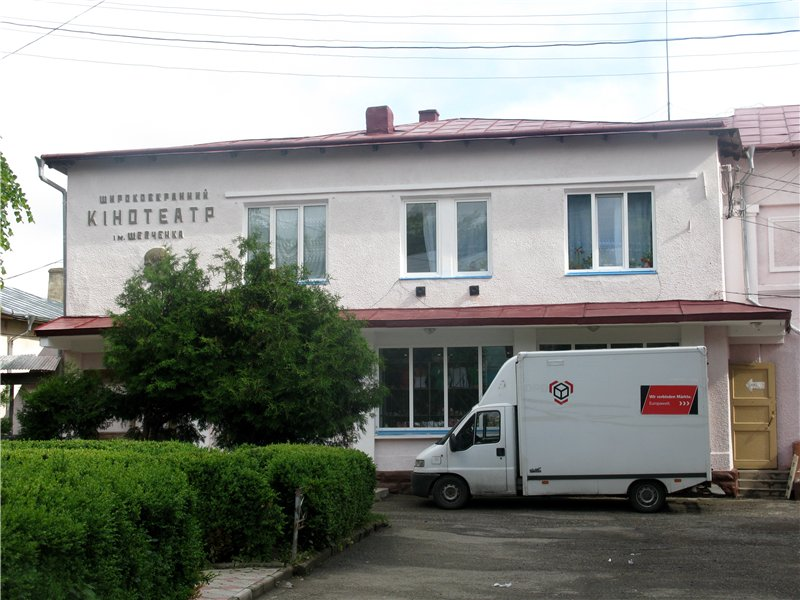
Vyzhnytsia cinema

== Nearby towns ==
- Kuty
- Kosiv
