= Pavlo Dvorsky =

Pavlo Dvorsky People's Artist of Ukraine
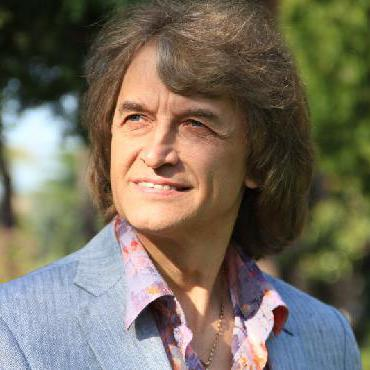
- Dvorsky in 2014
- Born: Pavlo Ananiyovych Dvorsky; February 1, 1953 (age 73); Lenkivtsi, Chernivtsi Oblast, USSR
- Education: Lviv Conservatory
- Occupations: Singer; songwriter; composer
- Years active: 1976-present
- Notable work: "Smerekova khata" "Stozhary" "Pysanka"
- Awards

Pavlo Ananiyovych Dvorsky (Ukrainian: Павло Ананійович Дворський is a Ukrainian singer and composer. He was named People's Artist of Ukraine in 1994.

Born in the Bukovyna region, Dvorsky rose to notability after he started singing in the popular Ukrainian ensemble Smerichka in 1976. Initially working as a backing vocalist to Nazariy Yaremchuk, Dvorsky developed himself as a solo performer and a songwriter within the ensemble. He wrote several songs for Yaremchuk and other singers, most notably with the Ukrainian poet Mykola Bakay.

== Biography ==
Dvorsky graduated from the Chernivtsi music school. In 1976 he was invited to the vocal-instrumental ensemble Smerichka replacing Vasyl Zinkevych and becoming supporting vocal for Nazariy Yaremchuk, while staying in his shadow for sometime. In 1979 there appeared the first songs of Pavlo Dvorsky - Stozhary and Poppy flowers for the son which was commemorated to Volodymyr Ivasyuk.

Smerekova khata became his visit card. The melody Dvorsky wrote on the Black Sea coast in Bulgaria while being homesick. After arriving back home he called Mykola Bakay and told him that he has a melody and the first words Smerekova khata, batkivsky porih... (A pine-tree house, the father's doorstep...). He knew that Bakay was the right person who would be able to find the needed words. The words were found in the matter of several days.

That song brought him the glory in 1985 after Yaremchuk performed it together with Pysanka. After that Dvorsky was recognized as equal in rights singer and started to sing his own songs. For his songs Dvorsky was awarded with the Oblast Komsomol prize.

In 1989 at the first bi-annual national festival the Chervona Ruta Dvorsky placed third in the pop-music genre that was taking place in Chernivtsi. In 1993 Dvorsky finished the Lviv Conservatory and next year started his own solo career. In 1994 he was honored as the People's Artist of Ukraine. After that Dvorsky went touring the New World giving concerts together with Volodymyr Prokopyk in the United States and Canada. In 1995 he returned to Chernivtsi witnessing Nazariy Yaremchuk to pass away.

In 1997 he was awarded by the national movement of diaspora with Knight's Cross of Glory and next year received the knight's title from the Archistratieg Mykhailo knightly order.

Beside music Pavlo Dvorsky has a title of the master of sport in tennis.
