= Levko Dutkivskiy =

Ukrainian composer

People's Artist of Ukraine Levko Dutkivskiy
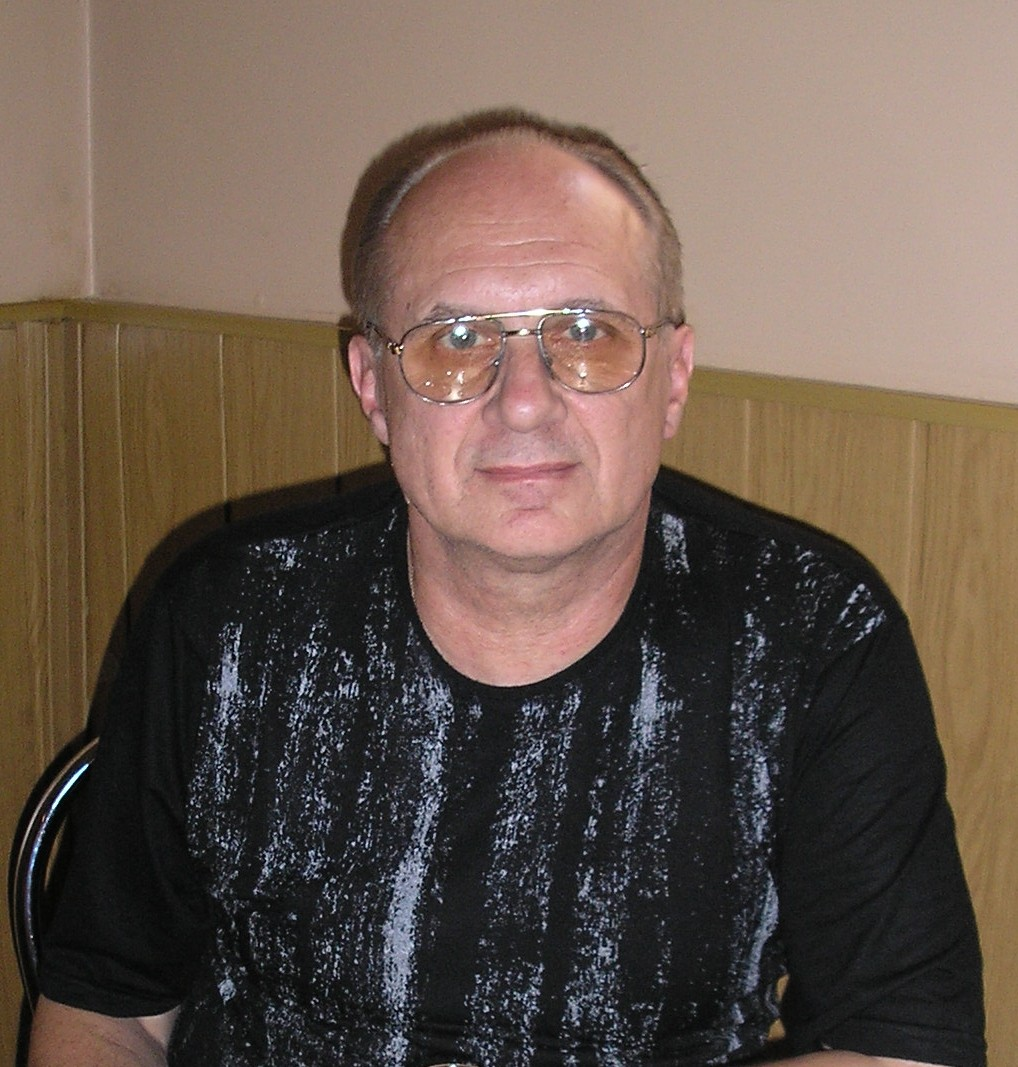
- Dutkivskiy in 2005
- Born: Lev Tarasovych Dutkovskyi; 9 April 1943; Kuty, District of Galicia, General Governorate (modern-day Ivano-Frankivsk Oblast, Ukraine)
- Died: 16 May 2023 (aged 80); Chernivtsi, Ukraine
- Occupations: Composer, director, pedagogue
- Years active: 1966-2023
- Label: Melodiya

Lev Tarasovych Dutkovskyi (Ukrainian: Дутковський Лев Тарасович), popularly known as Levko Dutkivskiy (Ukrainian: Левко Дутківський, born 9 April 1943 - died 16 May 2023) was a Ukrainian composer, director, pedagogue, social and cultural activist. He was best known as the creator and manager of vocal-instrumental ensemble Smerichka and became one of the founders of pop music in Ukraine. In 1981 Dutkivskiy was awarded with the title Merited Artist of Ukraine, and in 1997 - People's Artist of Ukraine.

== Early years ==
Born in Kuty, today part of Kosiv district of Ivano-Frankivsk region in Western Ukraine, Dutkivskiy studied at the higher music school in Mukacheve, from which he graduated in 1963. In 1966 Dutkivskiy moved to Vyzhnytsia in the Chernivtsi region of Ukraine (then Ukrainian SSR), where he worked as the head of local house of culture. There in September 1966 Dutkivskiy founded a band which played beat music, a new popular style during that time. The band was soon joined by an all-woman vocal ensemble and became known as Smerichka ("little fir tree" in the local dialect).

On 31 December 1966 the band debuted with its first song Snizhynky Padayut' ("The Snowflakes are Falling"), with music by Dutkivskiy and words by Anatolii Fartushniak. The first success was followed by songs Bazhannia ("Desire", 1967), U Karpatakh Khodyt' Osinʼ ("Autumn Walking in the Carpathians", 1968), also created in collaboration with Fartushniak, as well as Cheremoshe Syvyi ("Grey-headed Cheremosh", 1969) to the words of Mykola Nehoda. In 1971 Dutkivskiy composed the blues ballad Skrypka bez Strun ("Violin Without Chords") based on the words of Anatolii Drahomyretskyi. Smerichka's songs composed by Dutkivskiy united elements of rock, pop and jazz with Ukrainian folk traditions.

== Work in Chernivtsi ==
In early 1970s Dutkivskiy befriended Ukrainian songwriter and composer Volodymyr Ivasiuk, who started co-operating with Smerichka. In 1971-1972 the ensemble won two television competitions (Pesnya Goda) in a row, first with Ivasiuk's song Chervona Ruta, and for the second time with his composition Vodohrai (local Carpathian name for waterfall). In 1973 Dutkivskiy moved to Chernivtsi, where he worked at the local philharmonic, co-operating with singers such as Sofia Rotaru, Vasyl Zinkevych, Nazariy Yaremchuk, Viktor Morozov, Pavlo Dvorsky, Ivo Bobul and others. In 1976-1977 he also worked as sound editor on the regional television of Chernivtsi. Together with Smerichka between 1970 and 1982 Dutkivskiy took part in numerous tours around the Soviet Union and also visited Mongolia and Romania.

== Later career ==
In 1981 Dutkivskiy was awarded the title "Merited Artist of Ukrainian SSR". In 1987 he graduated from Kyiv State Instutite of Culture as an artistic director. In 1988, 1998 and 2001 he became a laureate of all-Ukrainian song contests. In 1997 Dutkivskiy was awarded grand prize of the President of Ukraine for his work on the rock-cantata Diva Mariya ("Virgin Mary"). He also became the founder and scriptwriter of the All-Ukrainian Song Festival named in honour of Nazariy Yaremchuk, which was first held in 1996 in Vyzhnytsia, and headed the Nazariy Yaremchuk Charity Foundation.

== Death ==
Levko Dutkivskiy died on 16 May 2023 in Chernivtsi as a result of a heart attack and coronavirus infection.

== Discography ==
- 1970 Pisni z Ukrainy ("Songs from Ukraine") - with Smerichka
- 1973 Poet Sofia Rotaru - with Sofia Rotaru
- 1973 Sofia Rotaru (flexible record)
- 1976 Smerichka - with Smerichka
- 1978 "Smerichka" performs songs of L. Dutkovskyi
- 1979 Hutsulochka - with Smerichka
- 1979 Rosynka - with Smerichka
- 1980 Tolko tebe ("Only for You") - with Sofia Rotaru
- 1980 Nezrivnyannyi Svit Krasy ("Matchless World of Beauty") - with Nazariy Yaremchuk
- 1980 Ensemble Queen (Great Britain) - vocal-instrumental ensemble "Smerichka" (flexible record)
- 1981 VIA "Smerichka"
- 1983 Songs of L. Dutkovskyi performed by I. Bobul and band "Zhyva Voda" - with Ivo Bobul
- 1991 Bukovyns'kyi Suvenir (Bukovynian souvenir)

== Sources ==
- Дутковський Лев Тарасович // Українська музична енциклопедія / Гол. редкол. Г. Скрипник. — Київ : ІМФЕ НАНУ, 2006. — Т. 1 : [А – Д]. — С. 674.
