= Josef Burg (writer) =

Ukrainian Jewish writer (1912–2009)

- Born: May 30, 1912; Vyzhnytsia, Bukovina, Austria-Hungary
- Died: August 10, 2009 (aged 97); Chernivtsi, Ukraine
- Occupations: writer, author, publisher

Josef Burg (Yiddish: יוסף בורג or, in Soviet publications, יױסעף בורג Yoysef Burg; May 30, 1912 – August 10, 2009) was an award-winning Jewish Soviet Yiddish writer, author, publisher and journalist.

== Biography ==
Burg was born on May 30, 1912, in the town of Vyzhnytsia, in the region of Bukovina, Austria-Hungary. In the years before World War I, the city of Chernivtsi, also called Czernowitz in both German and Yiddish, was the capital of the Bukovina region and a center of Yiddish language and culture. The region became part of Romania following World War I.

Burg published his first professional writing in the Chernovitser Bleter, a Yiddish newspaper, in 1934. The Romanian government closed and banned the Chernovitser Bleter in 1938, on charges of Bolshevik propaganda.

Burg survived the Holocaust during World War II, but lost his entire family. He took refuge in the Soviet Union.

Burg continued to write and publish his works well into his 90s. In 1990, Burg revived the once banned Chernovitser Bleter newspaper as a monthly publication.

Josef Burg died of a stroke on August 10, 2009, in Chernivtsi, Ukraine, at the age of 97.

== Awards ==
- Segal Prize (Israel, 1992) for Yiddish writings
- Honoured Worker of Culture of Ukraine (1993)
- Honorary Citizen of Chernivtsi (1997)
- Gold Medal of Honour for Services to the Republic of Austria (2002)
- Austrian Cross of Honour for Science and Art, 1st class (2007)
- Theodor Kramer Prize (Austria, 2009)

== Works ==
- 1934: Afn splav
- 1939: Afn tshermush [On the Czeremosz river] (German: Auf dem Czeremosz: Erzählungen. Boldt, 2005, ISBN 3-928788-50-7)
- 1940: Sam [Poison] (German: Gift: zwei Erzählungen. Translated by Armin Eidherr. Boldt, 2005. ISBN 3-928788-51-5)
- 1980: Dos lebn geyt vayter. Dertseylungen, noveln, skitsn [Life goes on: Stories, novellas, sketches]. Sovetskii Pisatel'.
- 1983: Iberuf fun tsaytn. [Roll-call of the times]. Sovetskii Pisatel'.
- 1988: Ein Gesang über allen Gesängen: Erzählungen und Skizzen.
- 1990: A farshpetikter ekho [A late echo] (German: Ein verspätetes Echo. Partly bilingual. 1999. ISBN 3-87410-075-8)
- 1997: Tsvey veltn. Dertseylungen, skitsn [Two worlds: Stories, sketches]. Mame-loshn.
- 1997: Tseviklte stezhkes. Dertseylungen [Unwound paths: Stories]. Majak.
- 2000: Irrfahrten. Boldt. ISBN 3-928788-35-3
- 2004: Sterne altern nicht. Ausgewählte Erzählungen. Boldt, ISBN 3-928788-45-0
- 2005: Dämmerung. Erzählungen. Boldt, ISBN 3-928788-54-X
- 2006: Mein Czernowitz. Boldt, ISBN 3-928788-55-8
- 2006: Begegnungen – eine Karpatenreise. Boldt, ISBN 3-928788-57-4
- 2007: Über jiddische Dichter. Erinnerungen. Boldt, ISBN 3-928788-60-4
- 2008: Ein Stück trockenes Brot. Ausgewählte Erzählungen. Boldt, ISBN 3-928788-65-5
