= Roman Kudlyk =

Ukrainian poet and writing critic (1941–2019)

Roman Mykhailovych Kudlyk (Ukrainian: Рома́н Миха́йлович Ку́длик; 4 May 1941 Jaroslaw, Poland – 21 January 2019) was a Ukrainian poet and writing critic.

== Early life and education ==
Kudlyk was born in a family of a serviceman. In 1945 he moved to Drohobych. In 1958 he obtained his general education in Drohobych. In 1959 he enrolled in Lviv University and graduated in 1964.

== Career ==
Kudlyk then obtained work as an electrician at the local oil refinery, newspaper and a magazine called October. He also worked also at the Lvivian TV-studio as the head of the literal department of the Lviv regional concert hall.

His writing was first published in 1957 by newspapers and magazines and then later in the collective volumes Apple bloom (Yablunevy tsvit, 1961) and Godspeed (Schaslyvoi dorohy, 1962).

He had been a member of the National Society of Writers (Ukraine) since 1965.

He was the author of the lyrics to Volodymyr Ivasiuk's songs, I am your wing («Я — твоє крило», 1972), «Нам спокій, друже, тільки сниться» (1978), «Освідчення». His writings have been put to music in the songs of Ihor Bilozir («Спогади літньої ночі», «Лебеді весни»), and Bohdan Yanivsky.

He wrote a libretto to several opera works of Bohdan Yanivsky, Oles Ballad «Олеська балада» (after the roman of Roman Ivanchuk Cherlene vyno «Черлене вино»), Princess Frog «Царівна Жаба», Golden chatter «Золотий гомін» (by Pavlo Tychyna), and musicals Fox Mykyta «Лис Микита», Ring of Temptation «Перстень спокуси».

He received the Lviv regional award of Oleksandr Havryliuk and in 1997 the Literal award of Vasyl Mysyk for the series of poems Night time grape-picking.

He was the head of the magazine Dzvin and lived in Lviv, where he died on 21 January 2019.

Some of his works were translated in several languages, including English, Bulgarian, Latvian, Russian, Romanian and French.

== Publications ==
- Conversation (Rozmova, 1963)
- Springtime billyard (Vesniany bilyard, 1968)
- Apple streetlamps (Yablunevi likhtari, 1979)
- Leaves of a wild grape (Lystia dykoho vynohradu)(Horishnia brama, 1991)
