= Nazariy Yaremchuk =

Ukrainian Hutsul singer (1951–1995)

Hero of Ukraine Nazariy Yaremchuk PAU, Shevchenko National Prize laureate
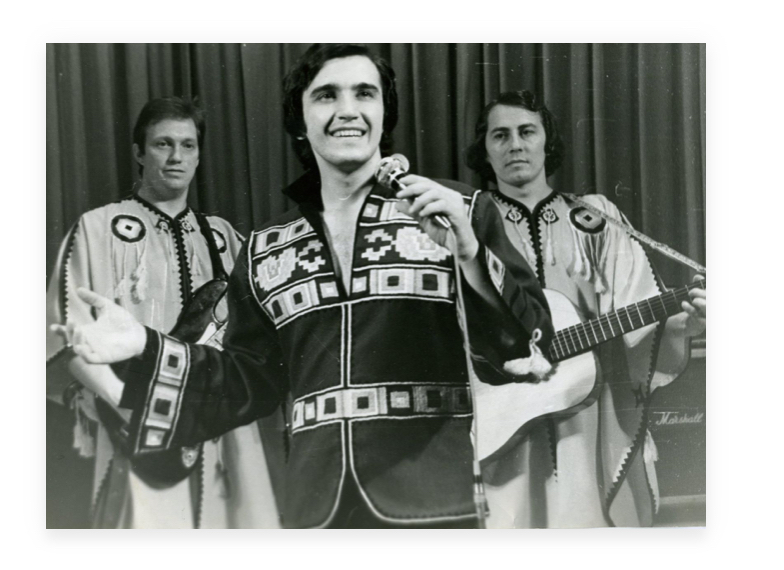
- Yaremchuk (centre) performing with Smerichka

Background information
- Born: Nazariy Nazarovych Yaremchuk; 30 November 1951; Rivnia, Ukrainian SSR
- Died: 30 June 1995 (aged 43) Chernivtsi, Ukraine
- Genres: Ukrainian pop, folk, rock
- Occupations: singer; songwriter; actor; musician
- Instruments: vocals, mandolin
- Years active: 1969–1995
- Label: Melodiya
- Website: https://www.roduna.org/

Nazariy Nazarovych Yaremchuk (Ukrainian: Назарій Назарович Яремчук; 30 November 1951 – 30 June 1995) was a Ukrainian singer, born in the village of Rivnia, Chernivtsi Oblast. He was posthumously named Hero of Ukraine in August 2021.

Until his death in 1995, Yaremchuk was one of the most-loved singers of Ukraine. He held on to the title People's Artist of Ukraine and was a posthumously recipient of the Shevchenko National Prize. In Ukraine, he was commonly nicknamed "the favourite of the country" and the "nightingale from the Bukovyna".

Yaremchuk was mostly known for his Ukrainian-language repertoire. Together with Vasyl Zinkevych and Volodymyr Ivasyuk, he was the first singer to sing in his native language at Pesnya goda. As part of VIA Smerichka, Yaremchuk first popularised songs such as "Chervona Ruta" and "Vodohray".

Yaremchuk's children became known in music as well. His two eldest sons Dmytro Yaremchuk and Nazariy Yaremchuk were both assigned the title People's Artist of Ukraine. Daughter Mariya Yaremchuk became a well-known recording artist and represented Ukraine in the Eurovision Song Contest 2014.

== Early life ==
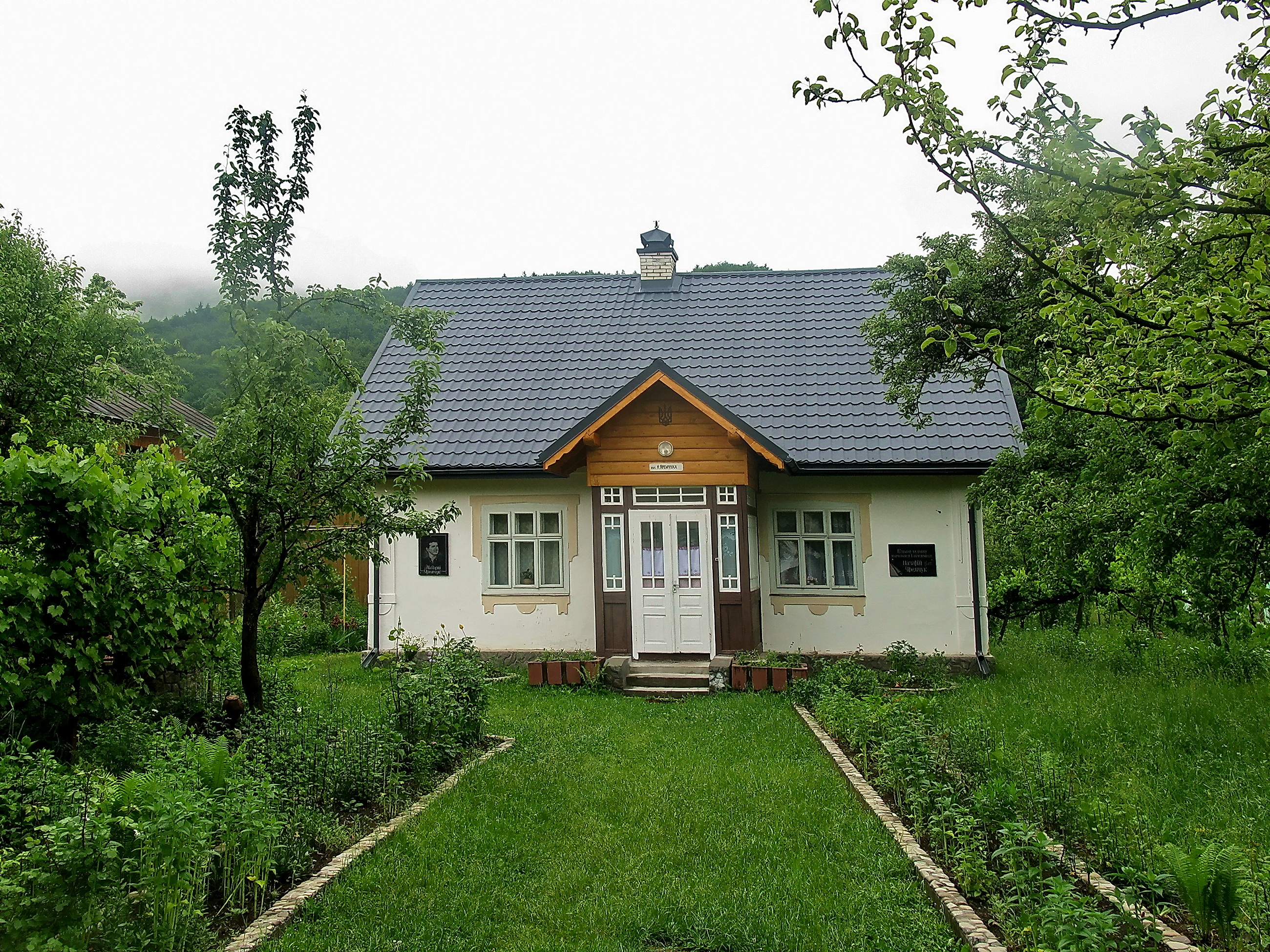
Nazariy Yaremchuk's native house in modern day Vyzhnytsa.

Nazariy Yaremchuk was born as the youngest and third child of Nazariy Tarasovych Yaremchuk and Mariya "Marichka" Dariyivna in the village of Rivnia (nowadays part of Vyzhnytsia) on the banks of the Cheremosh river. Due to the aftermath of World War II, the family was of a composed nature. His father was thirty-four years his mother's senior and was therefore already 64 when Nazariy was born. At that time, his father already had two adult children from an earlier marriage, Dmytro and Emilia. However, neither of them lived with them in the house. Young Nazariy grew up with his older brother Bohdan and older sister Kateryna "Katryusha", and their father's grandson, Stepan. In fact, Nazariy's half-brother Dmytro (born 1924) then resided in Winnipeg, Canada, after he had fled there at the end of World War II due to his activities the UPA.

Nazariy Yaremchuk was said to have a happy childhood and enjoyed music from a young age. That changed when his father died in 1963, when Yaremchuk was only twelve. This led to the decision of his mother to send him to a boarding school in Vyzhnytsia. There, he started to interest himself for choral music and mandolin. He eventually transferred to a secondary school to finish his education.

== Career ==
=== 1969-1974: Smerichka ===
==== 1969-1971: First success and Chervona Ruta ====
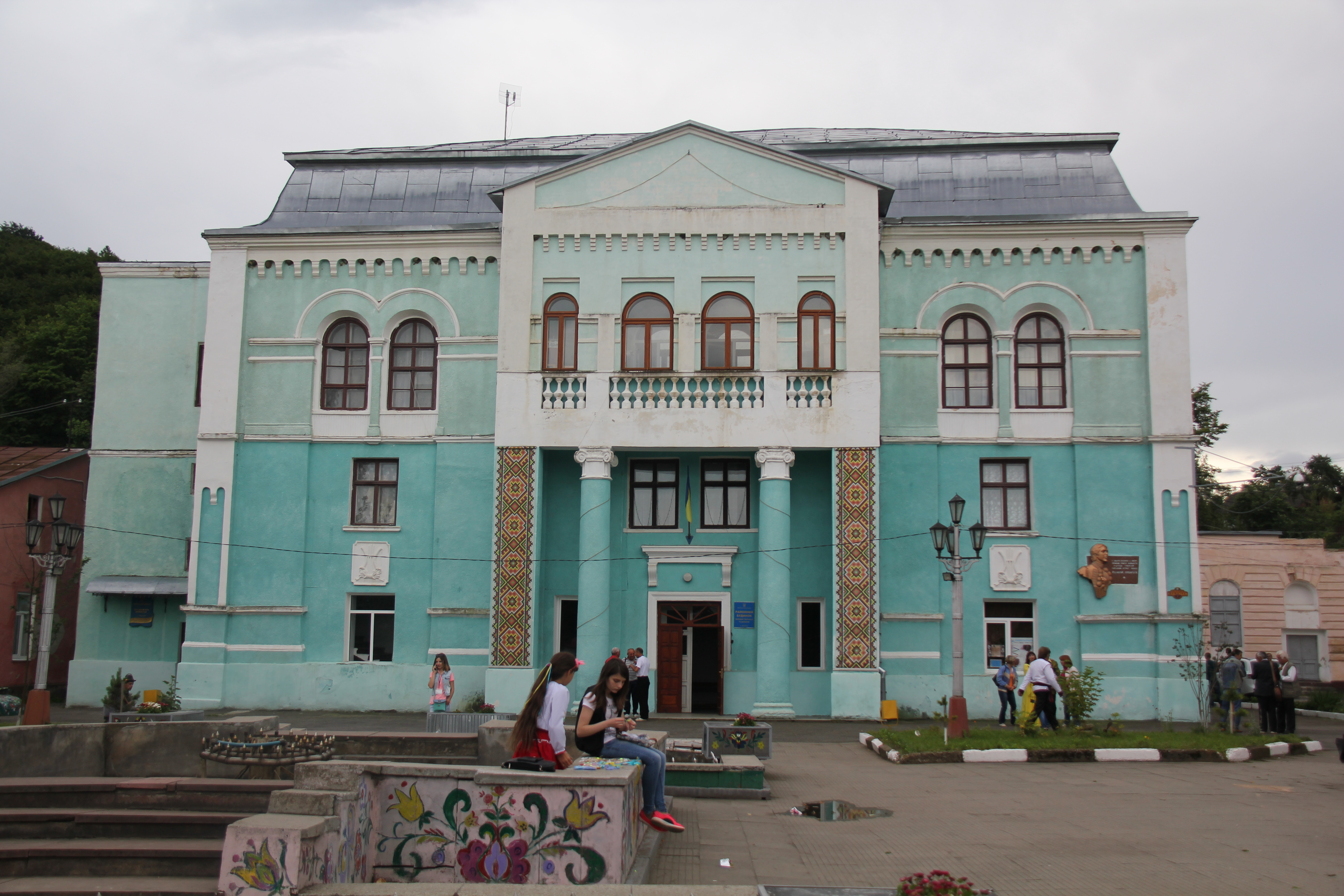
The Vyzhnytsia House of Culture, where Yaremchuk first rehearsed with Smerichka.

In 1969, Yaremchuk finished secondary school and tried to enroll himself at the Faculty of Geography of Chernivtsi State University, but his attempt was unsuccessful. Instead of studying, he started working as a seismographer and was employed in the Army. Through his Army service, he could enroll himself in a driver's course at the House of Culture in his local Vyzhnytsia.

After a driver's course class, Yaremchuk stayed in the House of Culture and attended a rehearsal of the VIA Smerichka as a spectator. Drawn in by the music, Yaremchuk, who had enjoyed singing a lot in his childhood, asked to join the group. After Levko Dutkivskiy, the musical director of Smerichka, heard his voice, he was invited to become a singer alongside Vasyl Zinkevych.

In September 1970, Yaremchuk successfully enrolled himself in the Faculty of Geography at the Chernivtsi State University after all and started studying. In the evening, he kept attending rehearsals of Smerichka in Vyzhnytsia while in the morning, he had to attend class in Chernivtsi. Because of the hassle, Yaremchuk sometimes stayed at Dutkivskiy's home.

Around the same time, Yaremchuk befriended Boryspil-based journalist Viktor Spivak of the Silski Visti newspaper. Spivak had only come to Vyzhnytsia by mere chance as he wanted to do a report in the Carpathians. There, he attended the rehearsal of Smerichka by accident as he was left bored in the small town. Spivak later recalled Yaremchuk's extreme musicality and very good pitch when they were hiking in the mountains during their encounters.

"Once, when I arrived in Vyzhnytsia, Nazariy found me and proposed me to take a walk in the mountains. It was a beautiful Carpathian Septembery Autumn. Nazariy took me on an unknown trail, I only saw unknown places around the mountains, and in the sky, God had spilt hundreds of stars. The stars were such large ones, there was such a serenity, it was such a warm evening that I just fell in love with the rich nature. At that time, Nazariy told of the mountains, of the local people. And then suddenly, Nazariy, stood still, and said silently:

"Viktor, a wedding."

"Where?" I asked.

"Listen, music is playing." He whispered.

"No," I said. "I don't hear it."

He had an amazing hearing, so it was not surprising, that he could hear music from several miles."

— Viktor Spivak, 2004

The popularity of Smerichka grew locally and in 1970, the produced their first mignon. The regional television station proposed to shoot a musical film with the group taking the main role. Plans however changed quickly and instead, several ensembles were incorporated in the film, including VIAs Karpaty, Evrika and young singer Sofia Rotaru, who had acclaimed regional fame at that point.

The eventual musical film was named Chervona Ruta, after the popular song with the same name by Volodymyr Ivasyuk. However, during the recording in August 1971 in Yaremche, Ivano-Frankivsk Oblast, a personal tragedy hit Yaremchuk as his mother died, leaving Yaremchuk as an orphan at the age of 19. It was initially unclear whether Yaremchuk would complete filming because of Hutsul mourning customs. In the end, Yaremchuk stayed on. In this film, he eventually played a soloist of the ensemble that Ivasyuk leads and performed "Незрівнянний світ краси" (The uncomparable world of beauty). Next to that, Yaremchuk could be heard as a vocalist on the songs "Chervona ruta", "Mila moya" and "Vodohrai".

==== 1971-1975: Height of fame, television contests and second film ====
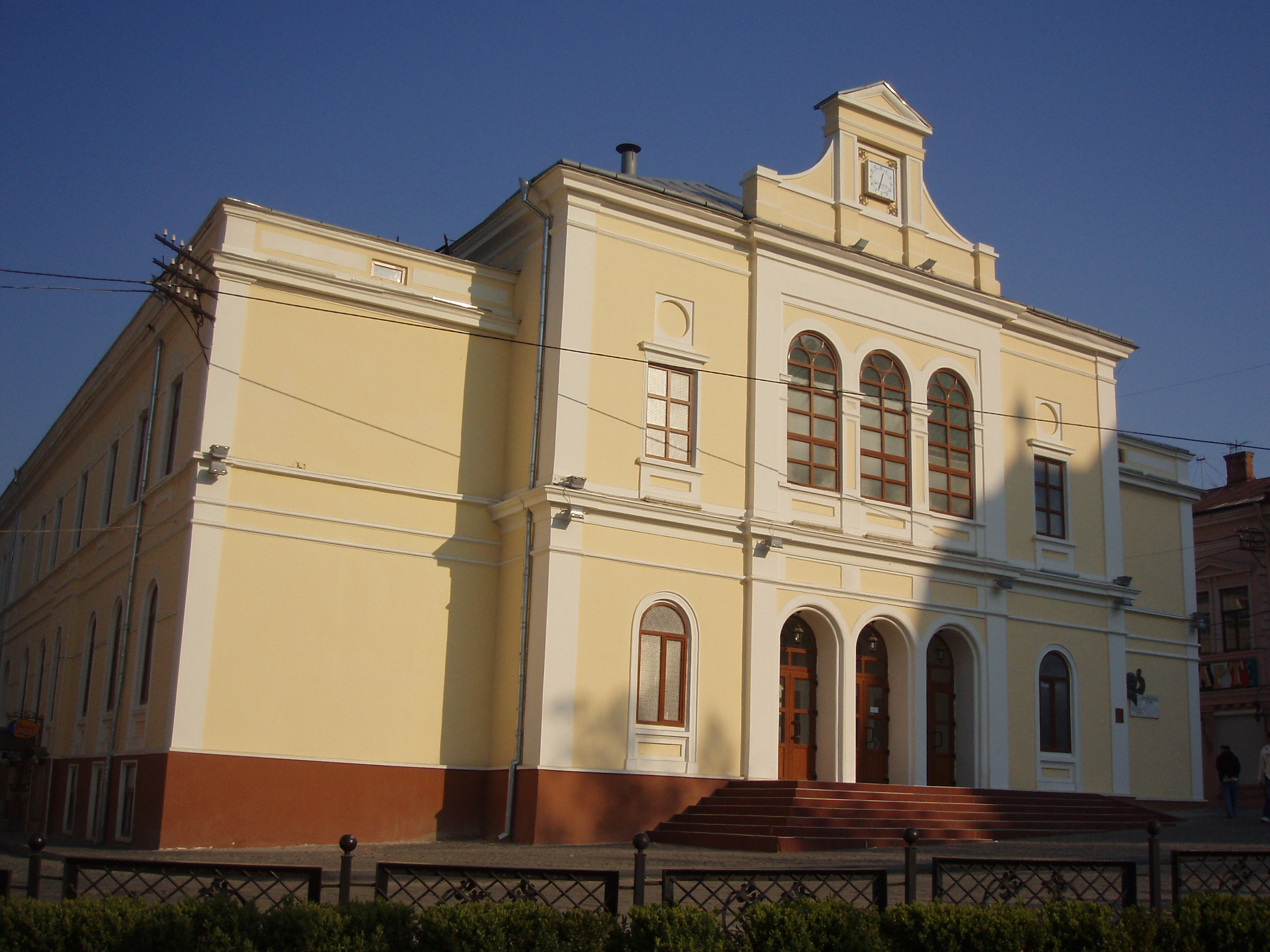
Chernivtsi Philharmonic Hall, where Yaremchuk worked from 1973 onwards.

The release of Chervona Rute threw Smerichka in country-wide fame. Quickly after that, "Chervona Ruta" composer Ivasyuk was invited to present the song at the first edition of Pesnya goda in Moscow. Ivasyuk found that Yaremchuk and Zinkevych had to come with him to the capital. Dressed in Hutsul-inspired attire, Yaremchuk performed the song together with Zinkevych and Ivasyuk. At the age of twenty, Yaremchuk was the youngest soloist of the night.

The group was invited to participate in the Ukrainian version of television music contest Allo, my ishchem talanty! in spring 1972, one of the first Soviet talent shows, nowadays comparable to X-Factor or Star Factory. However, the group refused to sing in Russian as the organisers had wanted. Instead, Yaremchuk performed two songs in Ukrainian: "Vodohray" with Mariya Isak and "Horyanka" with Zinkevych. In the end, both Smerichka and Arinka, another group only performing in Ukrainian, were declared winners. In January 1973, Smerichka were once again invited to perform at Pesnya goda and then performed "Vodohrai" once again.

After this, Smerichka became professional and were assigned to work with the Chernivtsi Philharmonic Hall. Smerichka started to tour extensively throughout the Soviet Union and even performed at the Mariinskyi Palace in Kyiv in front of Soviet leader Leonid Brezhnev, who was wrongly convinced that Yaremchuk wrote "Chervona ruta".

However, Smerichka became "too popular" in Ukraine and the Soviet authorities renounced Smerichka at party meetings. The group started to receive threats and there were attempts to create a fight between Yaremchuk and Zinkevych. In 1975, after an Estonian television company shot a television film with Smerichka in Ivano-Frankivsk, the threats became the duet too much. The film, Vistupaye ansamble "SMERICHKA" Levka Dutkovkskoho, was banned until the end of the Soviet Union for being too nationalistic. Zinkevych left for Lutsk, while Yaremchuk was thrown out of his apartment in Chernivtsi.

=== 1975-1981: Solo success ===
"We had to leave the Philharmonic and Smerichka. (...) But here in the regional committee of the party, they started to see that they had gone a little too far and wanted Nazariy to return to the Philharmonic. I was offered to create an ensemble at Chernivtsi University. I agreed, but set a condition: that Nazariy should be given a dormitory, because he had just married and he had been thrown out of his apartment at the Philharmonic. But he could not get at the dormitory at the university, because they said that the room that was to be given to Nazariy was given to the cooks instead. And then I said to the university, "Let the cooks then sing for you!". I called the regional committee of the party and say: “Did you want Nazariy to believe you are serious? He only will return on condition that you give him an apartment.". They promised it would be solved within six months, but after three months, it was already solved."

— Levko Dutkivskiy, 2017

Due to Levko Dutkivskiy's pressure, Yaremchuk was eventually given an apartment again and could return to his work at the Philharmonic if he wished. Around the same time in 1975, Yaremchuk graduated within the Department of Economical Geography of the Chernivtsi University. Although he was offered to continue to work towards a doctorate, he declined in favour of his musical activities.

Nazariy Yaremchuk returned to Smerichka, while Vasyl Zinkevych was initially replaced with David Stepanovskiy. In this formation, Smerichka released an EP with Dutkivskiy's songs in 1977. However, the ensemble's composition constantly changed and the popularity of the group declined whereas Yaremchuk became more popular as a soloist.

In 1978, Yaremchuk received the title Merited Artist of Ukraine. Simultaneously, he was awarded the Order of Friendship of Peoples.

Noticing that the group needed better musical direction, Yaremchuk requested Dutkivskiy to return to the Philharmonic. Dutkivskiy returned and made radical decisions with regards to the ensemble, leaving only Yaremchuk and Pavlo Dvorsky.

In Spring 1979, news reached Yaremchuk that Volodymyr Ivasyuk was found dead. Not thinking about the potential consequences for his career, Yaremchuk (together with Dutkivskiy) attended the protests around Ivasyuk funeral in Lviv and were among the first to lay flowers.

In 1979, Yaremchuk asked Dvorsky to create a song for him. This eventually became "Stozhary", one of the first solo hits for Yaremchuk in 1981. A year later, Yaremchuk released his first full-length LP Nezrivyannyy svit krasy, titled after the same song he sang in Chervona ruta. In 1981, Yaremchuk starred in the film Chervonta ruta: Ten years since with Vasyl Zinkevych and Sofia Rotaru.

=== 1982-1991: Musical director of Smerichka ===
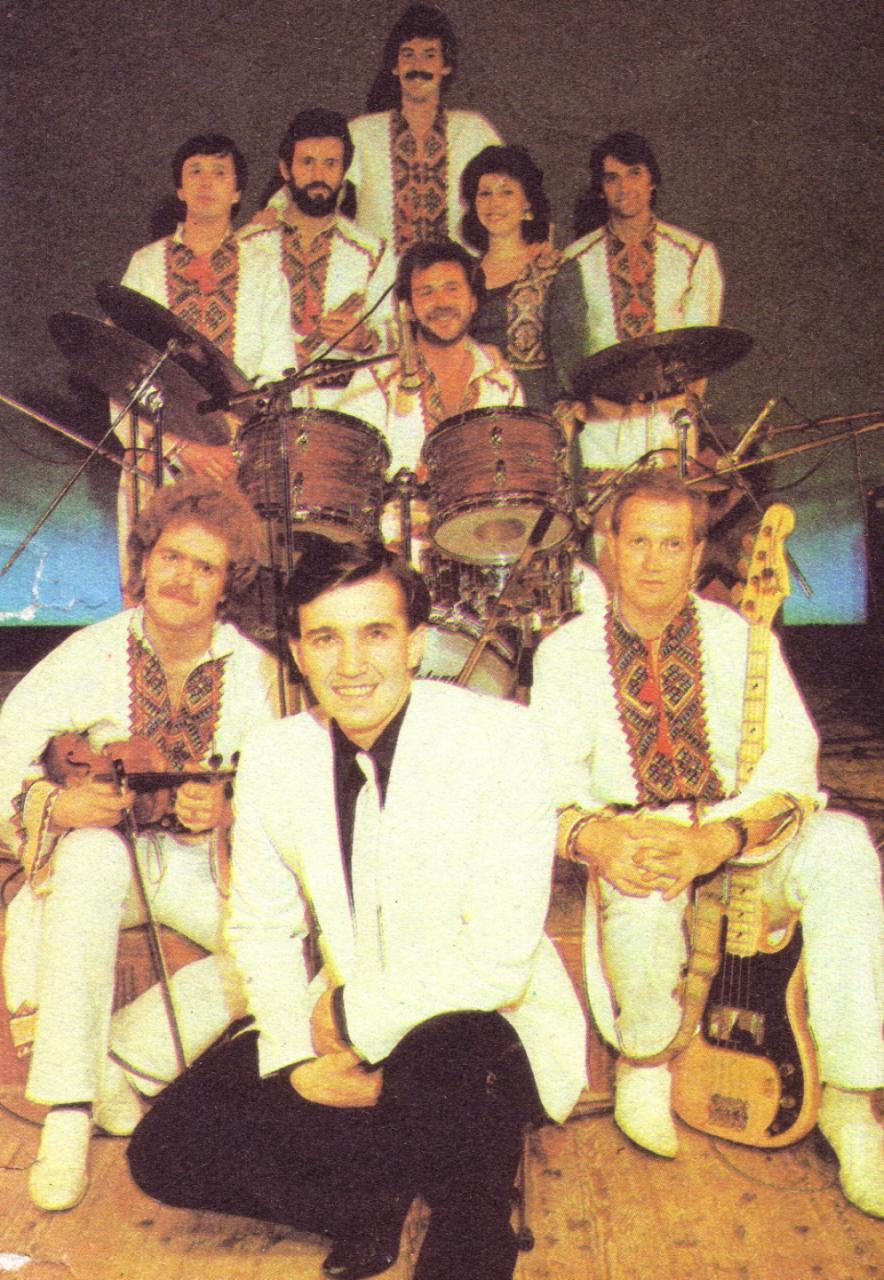
Yaremchuk with other members of Smerichka, 1984

In 1982, Yaremchuk became the new musical director of Smerichka after Dutkivskiy left over quarrels on the future direction of the group. Under Yaremchuk's lead, Smerichka went through a revival, although Yaremchuk's success remained central to their success. Meanwhile, Yaremchuk became acquainted with several new composers and lyricists, which shifted his style slightly in the 1980s.

Yaremchuk played in the 1982 Soviet television film Usmishky Nechyporivkky (Ukrainian: Усмішки Нечипорівки), portraying a sailor. In the film, he performed songs written by both Raimonds Pauls, Oleksandr Zlotnyk and Yuriy Rybchynskyy. One of the songs in this film, "Hay, zelenyy hay", written by Zlotnyk and Rybchynskyy, became one of Yaremchuk's most known songs.

The local television broadcaster of Lviv shot several music videos and performances for Yaremchuk throughout that time. Via that broadcaster, Yaremchuk and Smerichka were portrayed in the film Poyot VIA "Smerichka" in 1984. In 1990, that same television station broadcast a musical film with solely Yaremchuk.

In 1987, Yaremchuk was awarded the title People's Artist of Ukraine.

==== Concerts at disaster areas and war zones ====
In May 1986, Yaremchuk visited the disaster side of the Chornobyl nuclear disaster three times to perform for those who had been assigned to cleaning the site. During one of these visits, Yaremchuk went to the very core of the nuclear disaster. From his trip, Yaremchuk brought his protective clothing home, not knowing the dangers of radiation. When dosimetrists were checking on his house a year later, they found that protective suit hanging on the wall was heavily contaminated with radiation and had to be removed.

In March 1987, Yaremchuk and Smerichka director Vasyl Kosman were summoned to go to Moscow. There, they were told that Smerichka had been chosen to perform in Kabul, Afghanistan in lieu of the Soviet-Afghan War to entertain those who were employed in the war zone. Prior to Smerichka, Iosif Kobzon and Lyudmila Zykina had been sent. In May 1987, Smerichka gave a series of concerts for high officials and soldiers. Yaremchuk's songs, which were melodramatic rather than patriotic, brought many soldiers to tears, even if they could not understand Ukrainian. However, Smerichka and Yaremchuk ended up in a few life-threatening war situations. During a domestic flight, their plane was taken under fire and was left severely damaged. At another occasion, the group was isolated by enemy snipers. Due to the local conditions, Yaremchuk lost his voice, for the first and only time in his life. On their way back to Tashkent, where they were going to change flights back to Moscow, the plane was under fire twice, but was left mostly undamaged this time. Yaremchuk returned home from Afghanistan with a form of acute stress disorder.

=== 1991-1994: Concerts abroad ===
On 19 August 1991, Ukraine declared its independence from the Soviet Union, which Yaremchuk later referred to as "the happiest day of his life". The new independence and the end of the Cold War enabled Yaremchuk to travel overseas and outside of the former Warsaw Pact area. Between 1991 and 1993, Yaremchuk performed for the Ukrainian diaspora in North America and Latin America. To the diaspora, he dedicated the song "Leleka z Ukrayiny".

During one of his concerts in Canada, Yaremchuk first met his older half-brother Dmytro, who had been living in Winnipeg for half a century already at that time. Meanwhile, in the United States, Nazariy Yaremchuk got acquainted with American-Ukrainian singer Kvitka Cisyk.

During that period, Yaremchuk's repertoire turned more melancholic again. Yaremchuk mostly worked together with Oleksandr Zlotnyk, Vadym Kyryshenko and Mykhailo Tkach at this stage, releasing heartbreaking songs such as "Chuyesh mamo", "Batko i maty" and "Rodyna".

=== 1994-1995: Last concerts, illness and death ===
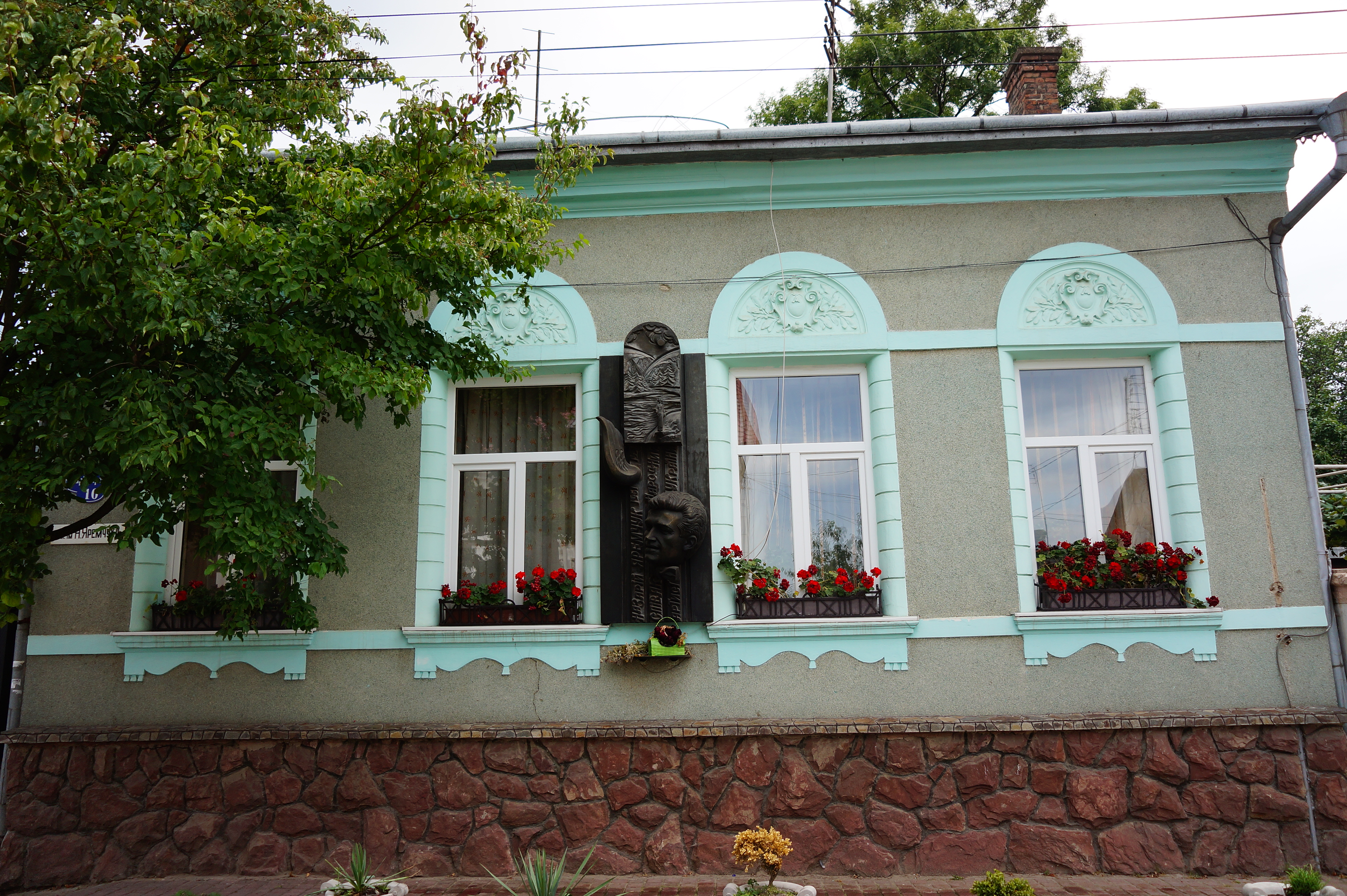
Yaremchuk's house in Chernivtsi, where he started living in the late 1980s.

In late 1994, Yaremchuk, who was said to be never ill, started feel "not very well". Within the space of a few months, Yaremchuk almost lost 20 kg. Friend and composer Yuriy Rybchynskyy noticed that Yaremchuk was ill during a concert in early 1995 when appeared weak and thin. A diagnosis was not made then yet, and Rybchynskyy helped Yaremchuk to travel to Canada, where they believed they could find better healthcare. Yaremchuk was quickly admitted to a hospital, where they found him to suffer from stomach cancer.

In March 1995, Yaremchuk underwent an operation and was told the known cancer had been removed, although the operation was at a too late stage to be sure of its effectiveness. Yaremchuk was left frustrated with this given. In his diary, Yaremchuk wrote:

"It seems to me that the past is one incessantly coloured ribbon. There was barefeeted youth, corn, where there was "Ilie, ollie, oxen free I'll find you behind a tree.". There was a certain unity with nature, the universe, and its symbol - the Cheremosh, and the desire for that river, for a living unique eternity, the conquest of the mountains, the knowledge of the greatness of the creator. When I was called out as a child, I hid somewhere in the grass and brooded a lot. Here, I will go somewhere from the house, then I will hide - and they won't find me... But the limit of life is 43. I'm in the hospital after a stomach surgery. Everything is like a dream everywhere: doctors, communication, the feeling of the abyss. The execution took five hours. Dr. Hairte said there was no more cancer."

— Nazariy Yaremchuk, 1995

Back in Ukraine, Yaremchuk performed at several stages and he recorded his last song, an honour to Volodymyr Ivasyuk. Yaremchuk continued to actively perform until June 1995. Among his last performances was his performance of "Rodyna" at Kyiv Day, where he turned up very weak, but stated that singing would ease his pain. His last recorded performances was at an evening dedicated to the work of Yuriy Rybchynskyy, where he sat down on the stage for half the song he performed. Two weeks after that, Yaremchuk performed for the last time at a small corporate event.

On 30 June 1995, Yaremchuk died in his home in Chernivtsi.

== Commemoration and legacy ==
A documentary film dedicated to Yaremchuk's life and career was created at the initiative of his daughter Mariya, seeing its Ukrainian premiere in 2024.

Yaremchuk's songs featured in the soundtrack of 2024 film U Are the Universe.
