= Vasyl Zinkevych =

Ukrainian singer and actor

Hero of Ukraine Vasyl Zinkevych Василь Зінкевич
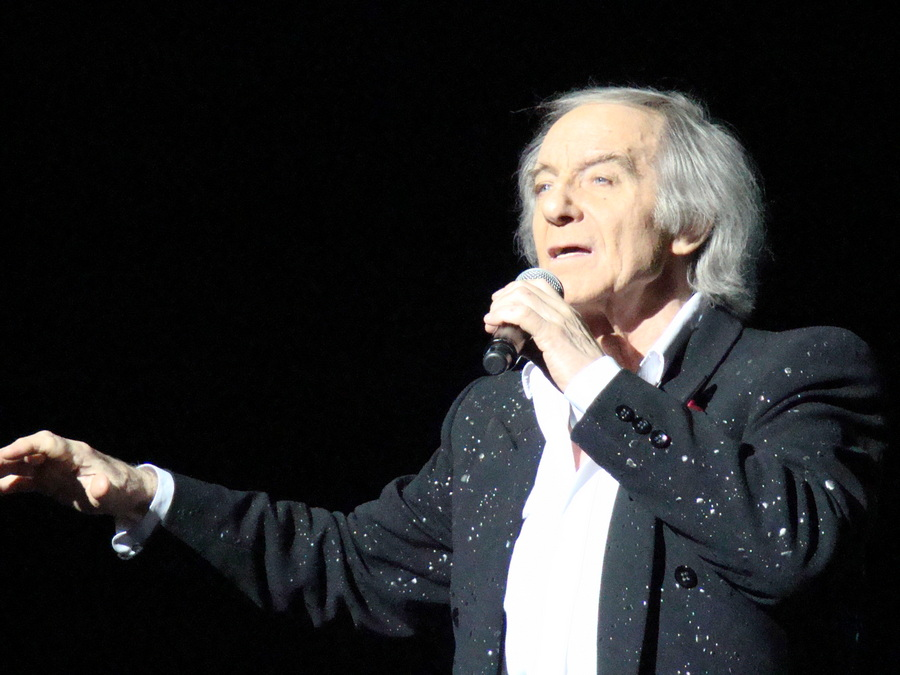
- Zinkevych in 2025

Background information
- Born: 1 May 1945 (age 81); Vaskivtsi, Ukrainian SSR, Soviet Union
- Occupations: Singer-songwriter; musician; dancer; actor; designer
- Years active: 1968–present
- Awards: Hero of Ukraine; Order of Prince Yaroslav the Wise; Order of Merit; Shevchenko National Prize

Vasyl Ivanovych Zinkevych (Ukrainian: Василь Іванович Зінкевич; born 1 May 1945) is a Ukrainian singer, actor, dancer and costume designer. Alongside Nazariy Yaremchuk, Sofia Rotaru and Volodymyr Ivasyuk, Zinkevych was one of the faces of the Ukrainian roots revival music of the 1970s.

Zinkevych found his initial fame as the lead singer of the Ukrainian VIA Smerichka and as the lead actor in the 1970 film Chervona Ruta. His interpretations of Volodymyr Ivasyuk's songs "Chervona Ruta", "Myla moia" and "Na shvydkykh poizdakh" made him known all over the Soviet Union. He was appointed a People's Artist of Ukraine in 1995, received the Ukrainian State Prize in 1994 and became a Hero of Ukraine in 2009. Several of Zinkevych songs, as well as some of his dance choreographies, made it to the "Golden Fund of Ukrainian artistry".

== Early life ==
Zinkevych was born several days before the end of World War II in the village of Vaskivtsi in western Ukraine. From a young age, Zinkevych loved drawing and wanted to become a metal worker. Zinkevych then went into required Soviet military service, first being stationed in Lviv and later in Czechoslovakia. During his service, as opposed to most of his colleagues, he became engaged in dancing rather than singing or playing music.

After completing military service, he moved to the tradition-rich Bukovina region, where he thought he could learn the craftmanship of metal work best. In 1968, he moved to Vyzhnytsia and was enrolled in the College of Applied Arts. He became involved in traditional dancing at the Dim kul'tury, the local cultural centre, in the dancing ensemble Smerchina. He also started to design and stitch national costumes.

== Smerichka ==
=== Early years ===
Composer and musician Levko Dutkivsky started a VIA named Smerichka in 1967 in that same cultural centre as in which Zinkevych danced. However, the group's main lead singer moved away from Vyzhnytsia in 1966, leaving Dutkivsky to find a new singer. When Dutkivsky struggled to find a replacement, Vasyl Vaskov, the leader of the dance ensemble Smerchina, suggested Zinkevych.

Dutkivsky taught Zinkevych to sing, and found himself pleasantly surprised by Zinkevych perseverance. However, when a local television station wanted to use a recorded version of Smerichka's song "Snizhynki padayut'", Zinkevych failed to deliver the version that Dutkivsky had desired. Television producer Vasyl Strihovych asked Dutkivsky to find another singer.

"Zinkevych was supposed to sing solo, and the girls would sing in unison. Vasyl, not having the experience of recording in a studio, did not sing like he needed. Strihovych proposed to me to find someone else. I remembered the student of the medical institute, Volodya Ivasyuk, who during the dances at the House of the Officers had sung my song "Bazhannya". Volodya arrived. Having a musical background, a violinist-to-be, he recorded the song in a few takes. Zinkevych was hurt in his pride then. He was offended, he was strudding the hallways of the studio, humming and humming something, and then requested me, to let him do just one more take. Having gotten his act together, this time, Vasyl sang better."

— Levko Dutkivsky,

Eventually, this last version by Zinkevych was chosen over the version that Ivasyuk sang, with Ivasyuk also preferring Zinkevych's version to his own.

In 1969, Zinkevych proposed that Nazariy Yaremchuk should join the group, to which Dutkivsky agreed upon hearing the latter's singing voice.

=== Chervona Ruta and international recognition ===
In 1970, Zinkevych, without having any prior acting experience, was cast as the lead role of Boris in Chervona Ruta, one of the first Soviet television musicals. He played opposite to Sofia Rotaru, who played the female lead role Oksana. The film was debuted in 1971 and was a widespread success throughout the whole Soviet Union, but especially in Ukraine. In the film, Zinkevych sang several songs that became hits throughout Ukraine and most of the wider Soviet Union, such as "Myla moia" and "Chervona Ruta". For a long time, Zinkevych and Rotaru were miscredited to have sung "Vodohray" in the film, but the version that was played in the background was sung by Yaremchuk and Maria Isak.

Due to the group's growing popularity, Smerichka was asked to perform a song during the first annual Pesnya goda in Moscow in 1971, alongside already established names such as Iosif Kobzon, Eduard Khil and Muslim Magomayev. In their Hutsul attire, Zinkevych and Yaremchuk looked very out of place in the Russian capital. The performance however was well-received by the audience and the clear confusion of the group, who was miscredited as "Semerichka", led to humour as well.

For most of the early 1970s, Yaremchuk and Zinkevych performed as a duet and as shared lead singers of Smerichka, with sometimes Yaremchuk and other times Zinkevych taking the lead vocals. Despite Yaremchuk's growing popularity, Zinkevych was not left hurt in his pride this time. According to a fellow Smerichka singer, Zinkevych treated Yaremchuk, who had already lost both his parents by age of 20 in 1971, as a younger brother.

== Move to Lutsk and Chervona Ruta. 10 Years Since ==
In 1975, Zinkevych decided to leave Smerichka due to his inability to deal with the pressure of having to give up to four concerts a day. Zinkevych became the main singer of the VIA Svityaz. With this, he also moved away from the Bukovina and started living in Lutsk. In 1980, he also became the artistic director of the ensemble. For his work in the Ukrainian music, he received the title "Honoured Artist of the Ukrainian SSR" in 1978.

In 1981, Zinkevych, Yaremchuk and Rotaru were featured in a short musical film, a spin-off from Chervona Ruta, titled Chervona Ruta. 10 Years Since. The film featured the artists separately reminiscing about the film and as well as presenting new songs. In the film, Zinkevych performed "Zabud' pechal' ".

"It was ten years ago, ten years ago... The film was shot in the beginning of our artistic life. A song gathered us, that song we sang just for ourselves, for the soul... without pretendencies, [which is] is such a great word. And that time, I will never be able to forget. (...) With the ensemble Smerichka, I am connected an awful lot. I was "born" in that group. And our friendship still continues to today. The success of that group makes me happy, but my non-participation in it has its drawbacks. Unfortunately, we only rarely meet, we both take part in our own tours, but when those meetings happen, we feel very pleasant, very happy."

— Vasyl Zinkevych, Chervona Ruta. 10 Years Since. (1981)

== Later years ==
After moving to Lutsk in 1975, Zinkevych had to deal with the loss of several of his former Smerichka colleagues, with Ivasyuk being found dead in 1979 and Yaremchuk dying of cancer in 1995.

Since the independence of Ukraine, Zinkevych has received numerous medals for his longstanding contribution to the Ukrainian music. He was already award "People's Artist of the Ukrainian SSR" in 1986. In 1994, he received the Shevchenko National Prize alongside Ivasyuk, who received it posthumously. In 2009, Zinkevych became Hero of Ukraine and honorary citizen of his city Lutsk. Next to being a performer, Zinkevych also designed numerous national costumes throughout the decades.

Vasyl Zinkevych played a major role in the early steps of Ruslana's career, being among the first professional musicians to see her musical potential. In a 2004 interview, he referred to her as his "artistic daughter".

In 2021, Zinkevych held a series of concerts in Palace of Ukraine in Kyiv.

== Personal life ==
At some stage, Zinkevych married an unknown woman and had sons with her, Vasyl (1981) and Bohdan (1983). His wife left him not long after the birth of their sons, which led Zinkevych to be a single parent, which he suffered from emotionally. Both Zinkevych's sons were active in the Lutsk 1990s hip hop scene. Vasyl became one of the founding members of Tartak and performed at the 1997 Chervona Ruta festival, where their appearance led to controversy over a highly sexualised performance as well as their non-conventional dancing and singing. Vasyl Zinkevych himself was not charmed about his 17-year-old son's performance and forbade him from further participating in the group.

For an artist of his status, Zinkevych leads a generally reclusive life and rarely lets journalists interview him. In comparison to his contemporaries as Sofia Rotaru and Nina Matviyenko, he rarely makes public appearances and treats the stage like a "church".
