= Volodymyr Ivasiuk =

Ukrainian songwriter, composer and poet (1949–1979)

Hero of Ukraine Volodymyr Ivasiuk
- Володимир Михайлович Івасюк
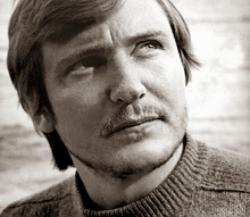
- Ivasiuk in 1972
- Born: 4 March 1949; Kitsman, Ukrainian SSR, Soviet Union
- Died: 24–27 April 1979 (aged 30); Briukhovychi, Ukrainian SSR, Soviet Union
- Occupations: Poet and composer
- Writing career
- Period: 1970-1979
- Notable awards: Hero of Ukraine; Shevchenko National Prize

Volodymyr Mykhailovych Ivasiuk (Ukrainian: Володимир Михайлович Івасюк, 4 March 1949 – 24–27 April 1979) was a Ukrainian songwriter, composer and poet. He is the author and composer of the widely popular song "Chervona Ruta" popularized by Sofia Rotaru in 1971, and later covered by other singers.

== Biography ==
Ivasiuk was born in Kitsman, in Ukraine's western Chernivtsi Oblast. His father Mykhailo Ivasiuk was a well-known writer from Bukovyna. His mother Sofiya Ivasiuk, from Zaporizhzhia Oblast, was a teacher in a local school. He had two sisters, Halyna (b. 1944) and Oksana (b. 1960). As early as the age of five, Volodymyr began learning to play the violin at a music school. Later, he learnt to play the piano as well. During his school years Ivasiuk was inspired by The Beatles and started composing big-beat songs. In 1964 he created a school ensemble called "Bukovynka" and wrote their first songs, the first of which was "Lullaby". Starting from 1967 he co-operated with Smerichka.

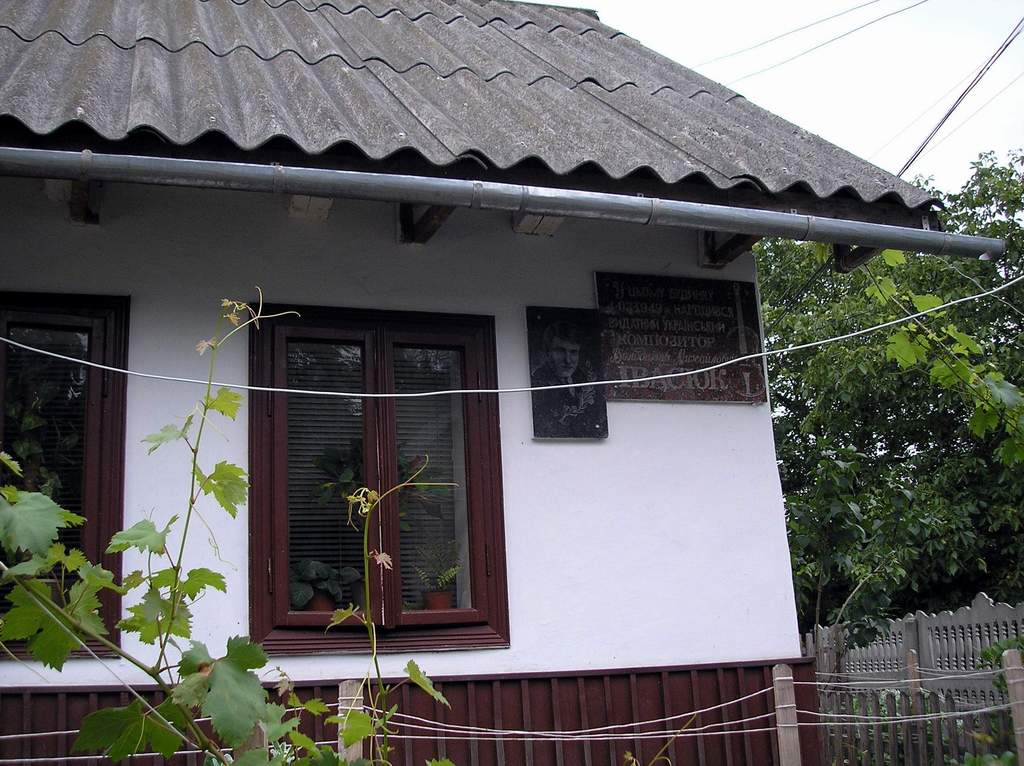
Ivasiuk's birth house in Kitsman

After Volodymyr had already graduated from secondary school, his family moved to the city of Chernivtsi where his father was offered a teaching position at the Bukovynian State Medical University. Volodymyr went on to study at the Lviv Medical Institute while he continued his musical career. He joined the "Karpaty Ensemble" at a local community centre and played the violin and offered his songs to be performed.

He became an overnight national sensation in the Soviet Union, after a public performance on 13 September 1970 of his compositions "Chervona Ruta" (Ukrainian for 'Red Rue') and "Vodohray" with Olena Kuznetsova. In 1971 his "Chervona Ruta", performed live in Moscow with Vasyl Zinkevych and Nazariy Yaremchuk, and won the Best Song of the Year award of the Soviet Union. His composition "Vodohray" won the best song award the next year as well. "Chervona Ruta", sung by Sofia Rotaru, was featured in the musical-film Chervona Ruta.

After moving to Lviv and finishing the local medical institute, in 1974 Ivasiuk enrolled to formally study composition at the Lviv Conservatory of Music. His mentors at the conservatory were Anatoliy Kos-Anatolsky and Leszek Mazepa. Upon graduation from the medical institute, he worked as a doctor, and joined the post-graduate courses at the Department of Pathological Physiology to work for his next degree. In Lviv Volodymyr created the songs: "I am your wing", "Two rings", "Ballad about mallow", "Ballad about two violins". All these songs and other works of Ivasiuk were premiered by Rotaru.

=== Mysterious death ===
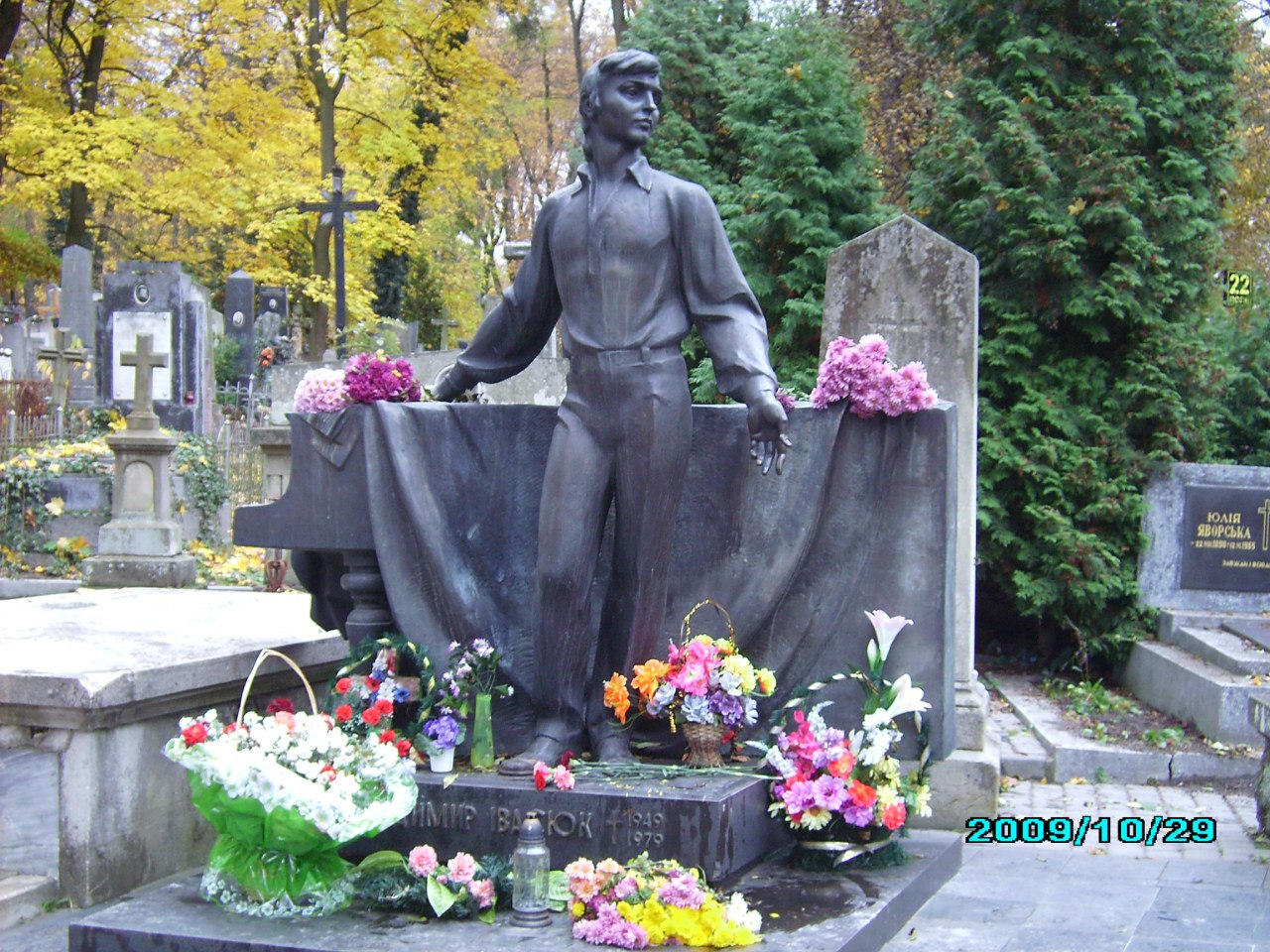
Ivasiuk's grave in Lviv

On 24 April 1979, after finishing a phone call, Ivasiuk was scheduled to meet someone at the Lviv Conservatory, but he never showed up. Three days later, his parents and older sister reported him missing to the police. An investigation followed, until the Lviv district attorney put a temporary pause on the search. On 18 May he was found hanged in a forest located on the outskirts of Lviv. The body was discovered by an off-duty soldier who was testing his radio. The official cause of death was listed as suicide, but the exact circumstances remain unknown to this day.

Ivasiuk’s funeral was attended by over 10,000 people, despite obstacles from the Soviet authorities. After his death the Soviet government removed his compositions from sale and banned the broadcast of his radio plays.

There is much speculation that Ivasiuk did not commit suicide, but was murdered by the KGB. In June 2019 a new official Forensic examination concluded that Ivasiuk could not have hanged himself without the help of someone else.

Ivasiuk is buried at the Lychakiv Cemetery.

== Compositions ==
During his career, Ivasiuk created numerous songs based on his own lyrics, as well as on works by Ukrainian authors including Rostyslav Bratun, Oles Honchar, Roman Kudlyk, Dmytro Pavlychko, Mykhailo Petrenko, Yuriy Rybchynskyi, Bohdan Stelmakh and others. Based on the folk melodies of his native Bukovyna and Hutsul regions, Ivasiuk's compositions at the same time included elements of modern pop music and played a key role in the formation of Ukrainian youth mass culture.

== Discography ==
Most popular songs:

- I will go into faraway mountains (Я піду в далекі гори), 1968
- Chervona Ruta (Червона рута), 1969
- Waterfall/Vodohrai (Водограй), 1969
- The song will be between us (Пісня буде поміж нас), 1971
- Two rings (Два перстені), 1973

== Legacy ==
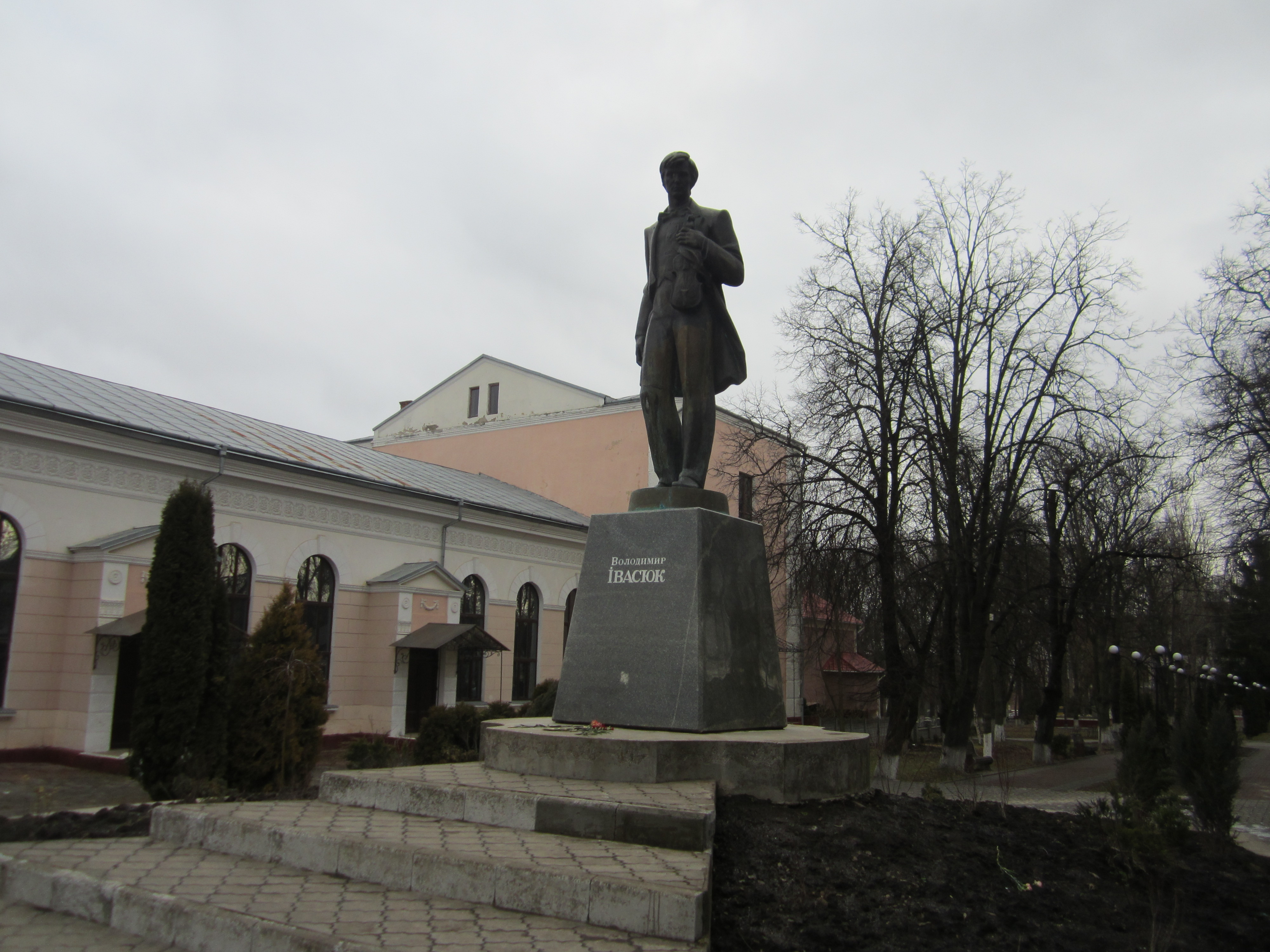
Monument to Ivasiuk in his native town of Kitsman

Chervona Ruta, an all-Ukrainian youth music festival dedicated to the memory of Volodymyr Ivasiuk, first opened in Chernivtsi in 1989, ten years after the musician's death. Since 1993 an international contest of youth singers has been hosted in memory of Ivasiuk in Chernivtsi.

A number of prominent Ukrainian musical collectives were named after songs composed by Ivasiuk, most notably Chervona Ruta.

Ivasiuk's celebrity status in the Soviet Union and his cultural contributions to Ukraine drew the attention of authorities. His songs, mostly about love to local geographical features and customs, could be perceived as rousing nationalist sentiments in listeners, but Ivasiuk was never confirmed to be politically active.

In 1988 Ivasiuk was posthumously awarded the Ostrovsky prize of the Komsomol of Ukraine, and in 1994 - the Shevchenko National Prize.

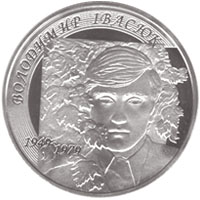
Jubilee coin dedicated to Ivasiuk

Among his legacy was the first Soviet rock-opera, whose scenario and songs were specifically written for performance by Sofia Rotaru. In 2009, President Viktor Yushchenko awarded Ivasiuk the Hero of Ukraine medal posthumously.

== Remembrance ==
There is a museum in Chernivtsi dedicated to preserving his memory and he has statues in Lviv and Kitsman.

In 2015 former Nohinska street in Dnipro was renamed to Volodymyr Ivasiuk street.

Heroes of Stalingrad Avenue in Kyiv was renamed to Volodymyr Ivasiuk Avenue in September 2022.
