= Chervona Ruta (disambiguation) =

Chervona ruta is a flower featuring in Ukrainian legend.

Chervona Ruta may also refer to:

- "Chervona Ruta" (song), a Ukrainian song written by Volodymyr Ivasyuk
- Chervona Ruta (film), a 1971 Ukrainian television musical named after the eponymous song
- Chervona Ruta (album), an album by Sofia Rotaru
- Chervona Ruta (ensemble) (1971-c.1991), a Soviet Ukrainian music group around Sofia Rotaru
- Chervona Ruta (festival) (1989–present), a biennial Ukrainian music festival
