= Saint Jonas's Festival =

Lithuanian midsummer folk festival

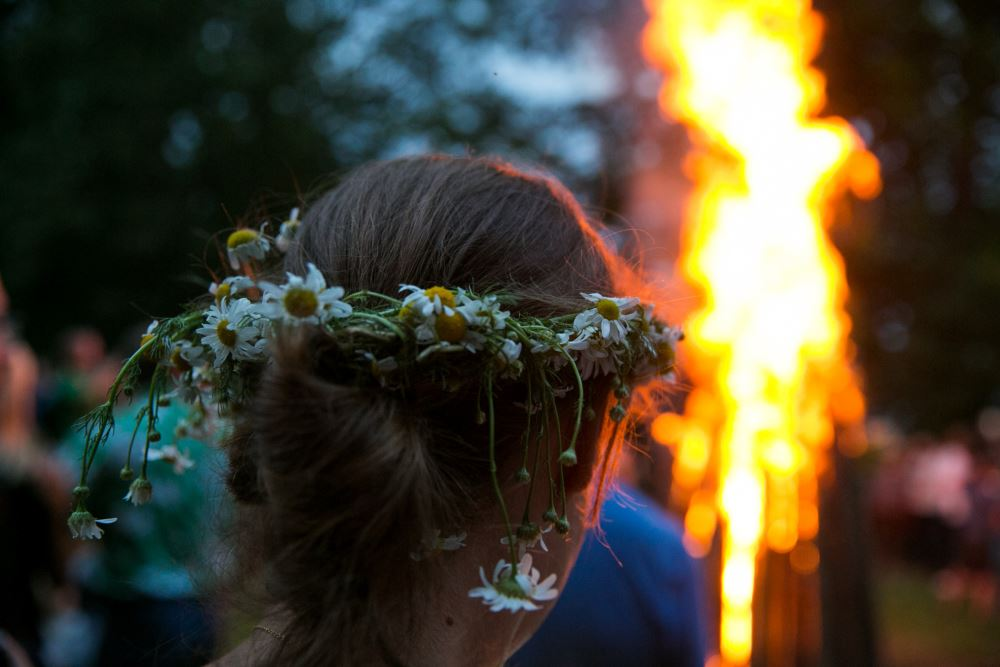
Celebration of Saint Jonas's Festival in Lithuania

Saint Jonas's Festival, also known as Rasos (Dew Holiday), Joninės, Kupolė, Midsummer Day or Saint John's Day) is a Lithuanian midsummer folk festival celebrated on 24 June all around Lithuania and by the Lithuanian diaspora worldwide. The celebrations often involve flower wreaths, bonfires and torchlit processions, and music and dancing.

== Background ==
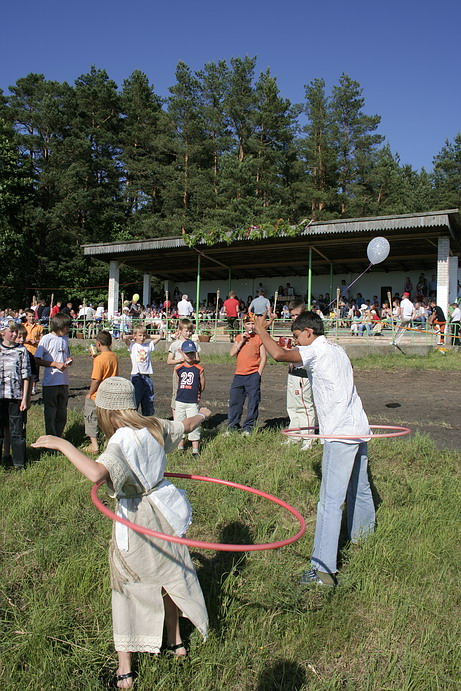
Celebration of Saint Jonas's Festival in Vepriai

The festival is a Christian festival celebrated widely in the Baltics, and is celebrated the night before the Feast Day of Saint John the Baptist. This coincides with the summer solstice, when the day is longest and the night the shortest in the year, and so the festival also has pagan roots. The festival is also called Rasos or Kupolė (the Feast of the Dews).

Celebrations may include reference to the hunt for the magic fern flower, torchlight processions, and traditional dance and music. A bonfire or pyrotechnics shows are also common elements of the celebrations, as well as weaving flower crowns out of flowers and herbs.

Some rituals involved girls decorating a pole (the Kupolė) with flowers and plants, and defending it from young men for several days, after which the flowers and grasses would be divided amongst the girls, and were considered to have protective powers against illness. There may be jumping over the bonfire, or there may be a tall pole with a wheel set at the top, and the wheel is lit on fire.

The magic fern flower is said to flower for one moment only, at midnight. Participants in the ritual search for the fern flow in silence and believe that anyone who finds it will have good luck.

Other rituals revolve around the dew, which is important for harvests. The midsummer dew may be believed to have special properties. Dew would be collected on midsummer night, and sprinkled on the garden, or applied to people's faces, or used to bathe sick people.

== History and traditions ==
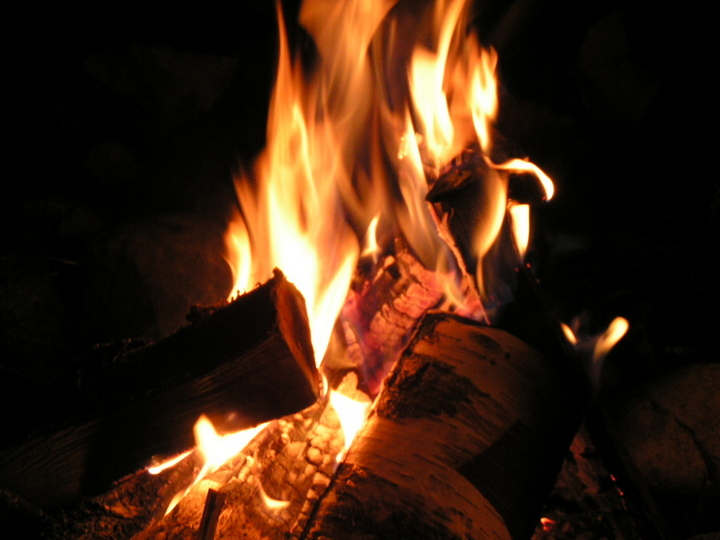
Bonfires are an essential attribute of Saint Jonas's Festival

The first recorded mention of Lithuanian Joninės (originally known as Rasos or Kupolės) dates back to the year 1372. This mention appears in the chronicles of Hermann von Wartberge, a chronicler of the Livonian Order. In that account, it is noted that Lithuanians celebrated rituals associated with the summer solstice, involving fire and pagan customs—practices which the Teutonic Knights considered pagan and attempted to suppress.

== See also ==
- Kupolė
- Kupala Night
- Jāņi
- Jaaniõhtu
- Festa de São João do Porto
