= Chervona Ruta (song) =

Popular 1968 Ukrainian song by Volodymyr Ivasiuk, widely covered

Song by Volodymyr Ivasiuk
- Language: Ukrainian
- English title: "Red Flower"
- Written: 1968
- Genre: Pop music, beat music
- Songwriter: Volodymyr Ivasiuk

Chervona Ruta (Ukrainian: Червона рута, lit. 'Red Rue') is a popular Ukrainian song written by Volodymyr Ivasiuk in 1968 and performed by many singers. Due to its wide popularity, "Chervona Ruta" is widely considered a Ukrainian folk song. It is named after a mythological flower, the chervona ruta, which if found turning a red color by a young girl, was meant to bring happiness in love.

The song's popularity peaked with the version performed by the Ukrainian singer Sofia Rotaru. "Chervona Ruta" is popularly known in Ukrainian and other ethnic communities that were once part of the Soviet Union and likely to be sung at weddings, karaoke and other social settings.

== History ==
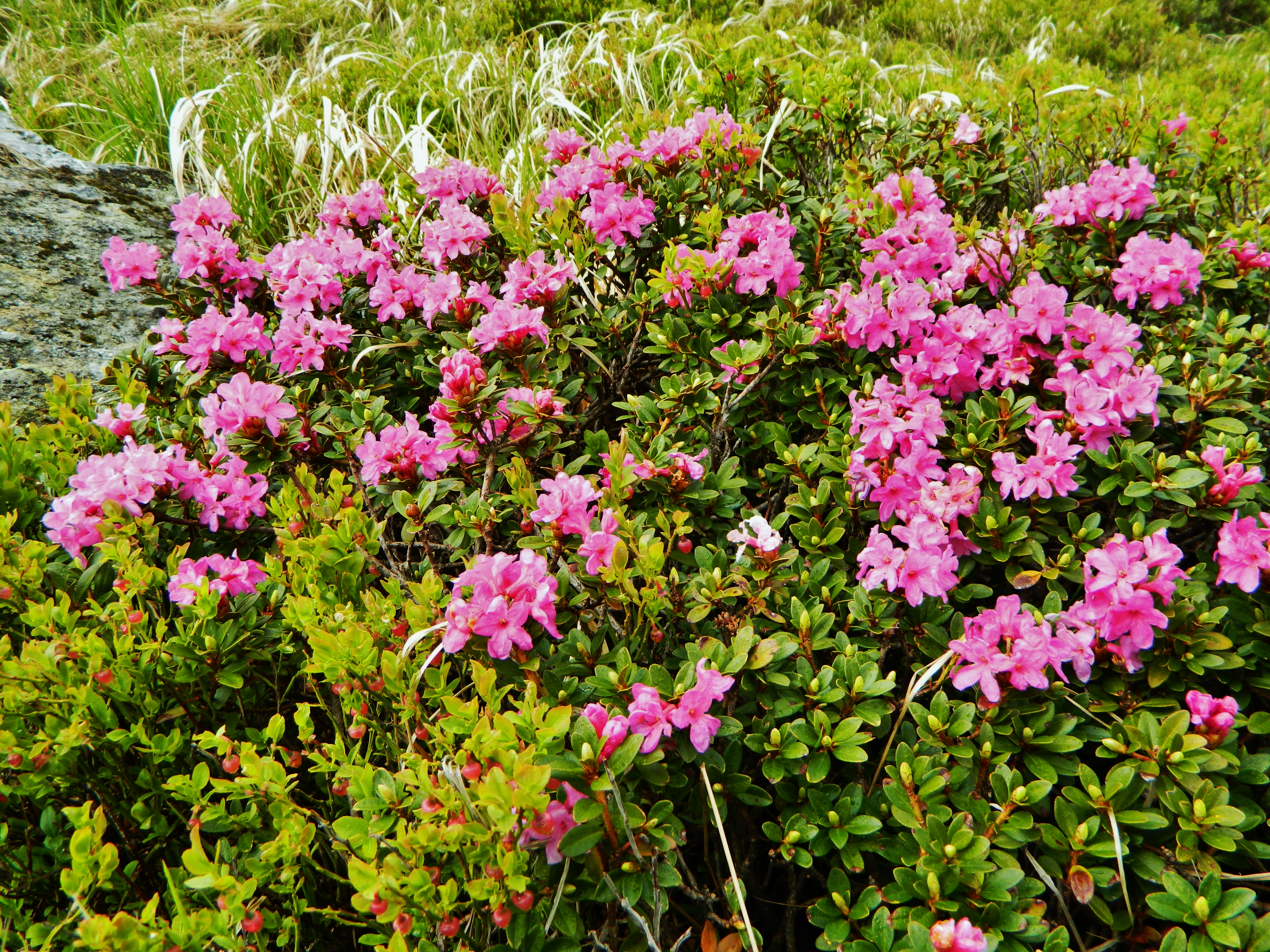
Chervona ruta — Rhododendron myrtifolium plant

The song and its melody was written by a 19-year-old student of the Chernivtsi Medical Institute, Volodymyr Ivasiuk. Volodymyr was inspired by a collection of kolomyikas (traditional folk songs/dances of Pokuttia and Prykarpattia), authored by Volodymyr Hnatiuk and found in his father's library.

Ivasiuk was puzzled by the mention of "chervona ruta" in some of the kolomyikas. "Chervona ruta" literally means "red rue", however, the flowers of the plant rue are yellow. According to the local legend, the rue turns red on the Day of Kupala Night for a few minutes. A girl that finds that flower will be happy in love. Chervona ruta in the meaning of "red plant" or "red flower" is also associated with an attractive alpine plant with medicinal properties, Rhododendron myrtifolium, that grows in the Carpathian Mountains in western Ukraine.

== Performances ==
The first public performance of "Chervona Ruta" (and debut of Volodymyr Ivasiuk) was on September 13, 1970, at a television broadcast from a theatre in Chernivtsi sung by the author and Olena Kuznetsova. In 1971 the Ukrainian pop group Smerichka (Ukrainian: Смерічка) performed "Chervona Ruta", and this further helped the song's rise in popularity. Performed by Smerichka, the song won the title USSR "Song of the Year" at the 1971 Television Song Festival competition in Moscow. It was also a multiple prizewinner in other Eastern European countries, sung by other groups.

In 1971 the film Chervona Ruta was made, which featured many of the Ivasiuk's songs, including the song "Chervona Ruta", sung by Sofia Rotaru and Vasyl Zinkevych.

In 1972 the song was included by the Czech singer Pavel Liška in his album Písničky Pro Každý Den as the Ukrainian folk song "Až mi dáš znamení". The translation was done by Ronald Kraus. In 1972, the song "Chervona Ruta" was recorded by the Polish skiffle group No To Co. The hard rock arrangement was made by Jerzy Krzemiński.

"Chervona Ruta" was the debut song of Ruslana (who later became winner of the Eurovision Song Contest 2004), which she performed at the Slavianski Bazaar in Vitebsk in 1996. For her performance, she won first place with the maximum points (10) from all the jury, and was congratulated by the president of Belarus.

The song was also performed by Rotaru together with the Ukrainian band Tanok na Maidani Kongo and was filmed for the musical film Kingdom of Skewed Mirrors, produced by Russian state TV channel Rossiya in 2008.

A Kyivan native, Anna Sedokova when performing the song added some English translation, but to date the only complete English adaptation/translation and recording of this song has been by British-born singer songwriter of Ukrainian and Irish descent Stepan Pasicznyk.

"Chervona Ruta" is one of the most popular Ukrainian songs and has been performed by many singers, among them:

- Volodymyr Ivasiuk, Vasyl Zinkevych, Nazariy Yaremchuk
- Sofia Rotaru
- Nazariy Yaremchuk
- Vasyl Zinkevych
- Yaroslav Evdokimov
- Stepan Pasicznyk (English translation)
- Ruslana
- Gogol Bordello

== See also ==
- Chervona Ruta (film)
- Chervona Ruta (festival)
- Volodymyr Ivasiuk
