= Chervona ruta =

Mythological or actual species of flowering plants

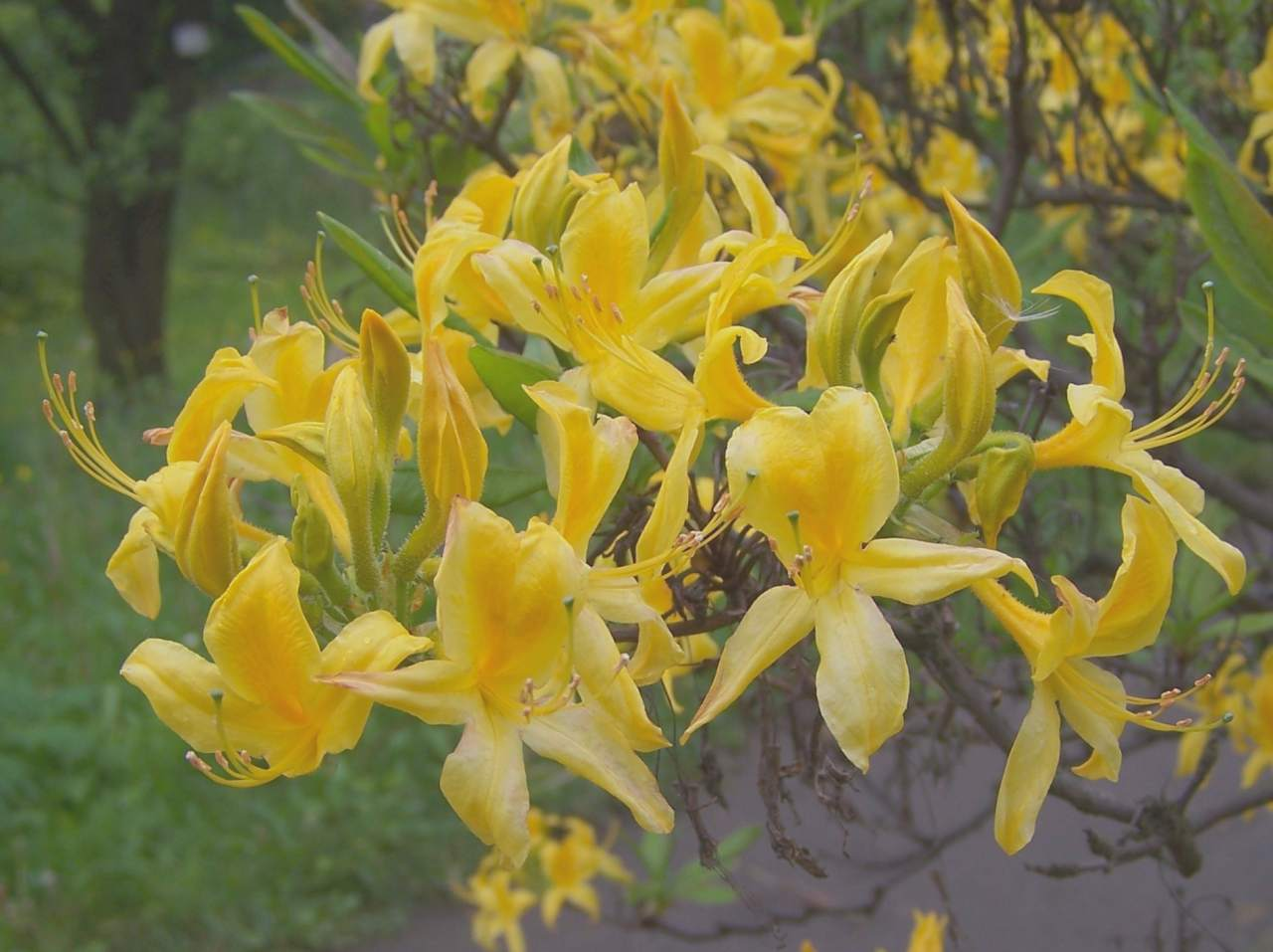
Yellow rhododendron

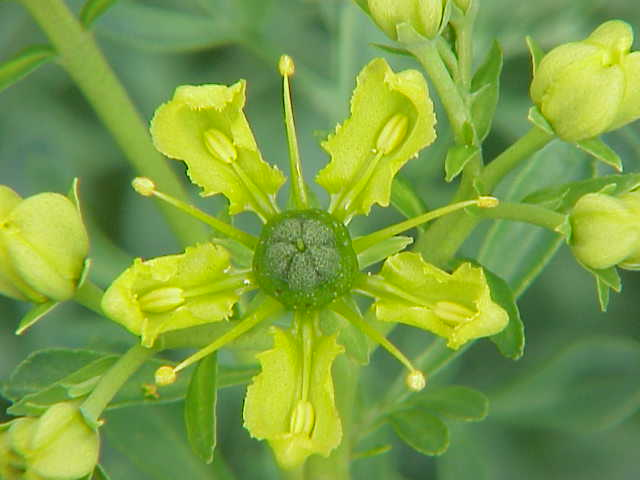
Flower of the sweet-scented rue

The Chervona ruta (Monarda, Ukrainian: Червона рута, lit. 'Red Rue') may refer to a mythological or actual species of flowering plants in the rue genus of the citrus family, Rutaceae, or the rhododendron genus of the heath family, Ericaceae.

== Biology ==
- Rue (Latin: ruta) is a name for the plant from the family Rutaceae. There are about 60 known types of rutas, wildly growing in the Mediterranean regions, Western and Middle Asia. One type of rue grows on the territory of Southern Ukraine: common rue, a sweet-scented herb-of-grace which grows in Crimea, on the rocky slopes. Common rue (Ruta graveolens L.) is the most common type, a subshrub, naked, greyish green suffrutex plant, up to 40 cm in height. Its leaves are pinnately dissected and it has a corymb inflorescence in the form of panicle.
- According to another opinion, "chervona ruta" means golden and/or yellow rhododendron, or a red species, Rhododendron myrtifolium.

== Legend ==
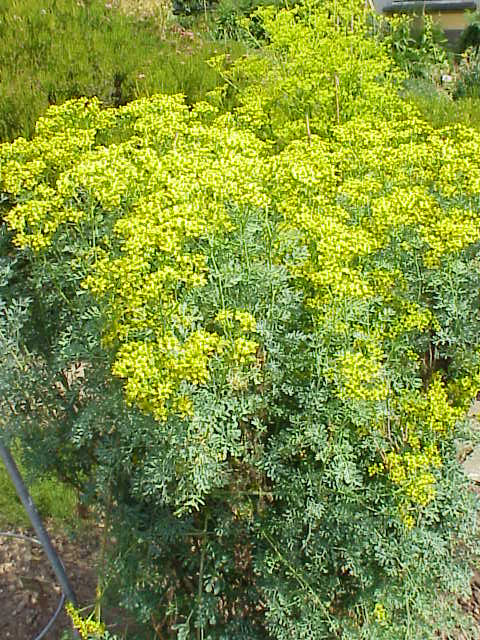
Winter rue

"Chervona" is translated from Ukrainian as red. The ruta flower has yellow blooms, but according to legend, on the eve of Ivan Kupala Day, the flower turns red for a very short time on the eve of the summer solstice (celebrated on June 23 or sometimes July 7).

The flower brings fortune to the person who finds it. In various versions of the tale, the fern flower brings luck, wealth, or the ability to understand animal speech. However, the flower is closely guarded by evil spirits and anyone who finds the flower will have access to earthly riches, which have never benefited anyone, so the decision to pick the flower or leave it alone is left up to the individual.

== Popular culture ==
"Chervona Ruta" is a popular Ukrainian song written by Volodymyr Ivasyuk in 1968 and performed by many singers and groups. It was popularised by Ukrainian groups like "Smerichka" and singer Sofia Rotaru, who later formed the Chervona Ruta ensemble.

The song's initial popularity was followed by a 1971 Ukrainian musical film Chervona Ruta written by Miroslav Skochilyas and directed by Roman Oleksiv, starring Sofia Rotaru and Vasyl Zinkevych alongside other popular Soviet Ukrainian ensembles.

The Chervona Ruta Festival is a biennial music festival in Ukraine, which started in 1989.

== See also ==
- Chervona Ruta (song)
- Fern flower
