= Fern flower =

Mythical flower

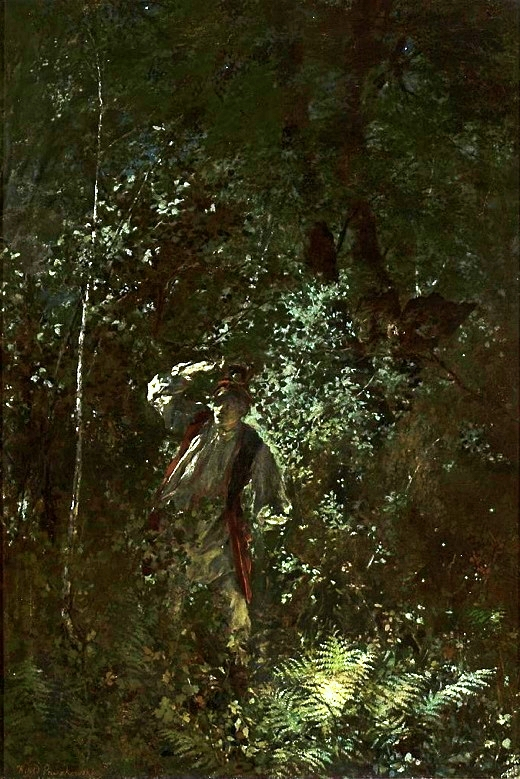
Fern flower (1875) by Witold Pruszkowski, National Museum in Warsaw.

The fern flower is a magic flower in Baltic mythology (Lithuanian: paparčio žiedas, Latvian: papardes zieds), in Estonian mythology (Estonian: sõnajalaõis) and in Slavic mythology (Ukrainian: цвіт папороті, Belarusian: папараць-кветка, Polish: kwiat paproci, Russian: цветок папоротника).

== Tradition ==
According to the myth, this flower blooms for a very short time on the eve of the summer solstice (celebrated on June 21, June 23 and 24 or sometimes July 7). It brings fortune to the person who finds it. In some tales, it allows humans to understand animal speech. It is closely guarded by evil spirits and though the one who succeeds in gathering it can receive earthly riches, that attainment has always brought ill luck, so some leave it alone.

=== Estonian and Baltic ===
In the Estonian, Lithuanian and Latvian tradition, the fern flower is supposed to appear only on the night of 23 to 24 June during the celebration of the summer solstice which is called Jāņi in Latvia, Joninės or Rasos in Lithuania, Jaaniõhtu or Jaaniöö in Estonia and juhannus in Finland. The celebration has pre-Christian origins. In addition to the idea that the finder of the fern flower will become rich or happy, here, the fern flower is sometimes perceived a symbol of fertility. During this supposedly magical night, young couples go into the woods "seeking the fern flower", which is most commonly read as a euphemism for sex. Sex can lead to pregnancy; the child could be thought of as the fern flower.

Referring to this tradition, Papardes zieds ("fern flower" in Latvian) is the name of an NGO in Latvia that promotes education about matters pertaining to sexuality, fertility, and relationships.

=== Swedish ===
Similar beliefs are attested in Sweden, where the fern flower was said to be found only at midnight on Midsummer's Eve, and even then was protected by magic and thus hard to obtain. This also applied to horsetail and daphne flowers; of daphne, a flowering plant, it was said: "The flowers are a rarity if picked on nights when they are believed to bloom. The naturally occurring flowers no one believes to be daphne flowers." (Note: "Blommor äro en raritet om de tagas de nätter de tros blomma. De blommor som äro naturliga tror ingen vara tibastblommor." Ericsson, Folklivet i Åkers och Rekarne härader, p. 251.)

=== East Slavic ===
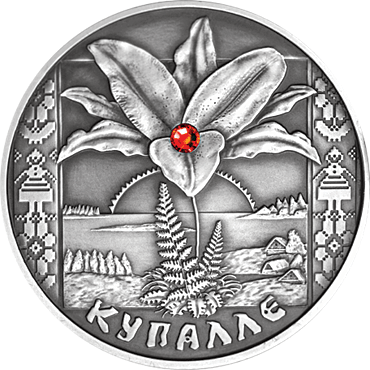
Fern flower on a silver commemorative coin of the National Bank of the Republic of Belarus.

In Ukraine, Belarus, and in Poland, the holiday is practiced on the eve of Ivan Kupala Day. Young girls wear wreaths in their hair and couples go into the woods searching for the fern flower. When they come out of the woods, if the male is wearing the girl's wreath, it means the couple is engaged to be married.

According to Ukrainian folklore, the flower is called Chervona Ruta. It is yellow, but according to legend, it turns red on the eve of Ivan Kupala Day.

=== Polish ===
In many parts of Poland, adder’s tongue (Ophioglossum vulgatum) was believed to be fern flower. It is a fern that does not look like a fern. It lacks the characteristic divided fine leaves. The leaf is simple and is accompanied by a stalk with spores. Altogether it looks like a green calla-type flower or a plantain. Hundreds of years ago, people in the Polish countryside figured out that it was a kind of fern. Central Europe is rife with stories of a flowering fern blooming only on Midsummer night or at Christmas. And in Poland, the flowering fern usually meant adder’s tongue. A lot of magic powers were attributed to this plant. The plant is very small and easy to overlook in grass swards. It was believed that adder’s tongue opened all locks. It also brought immense luck in love. The following love charm was uttered while collecting the plant:

Nasięźrzale, nasięźrzale,
Rwę cię śmiale,
Pięcią palcy, szóstą, dłonią,
Niech się chłopcy za mną gonią;
Po stodole, po oborze,
Dopomagaj, Panie Boże.

Adder’s tongue, adder’s tongue,
I bravely collect you,
With five fingers, with the sixth hand;
Let boys chase me,
Around the barn, around the shed,
Let God help.

== Blooming ferns ==
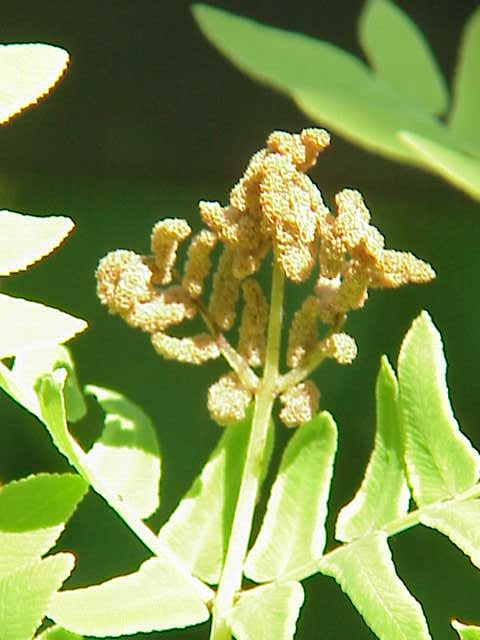
A "fertile frond" of a true fern is not really a flower at all.

Ferns are not flowering plants, but the myth may be rooted in a reality when the grouping of plants was not exactly the same as the modern taxonomy. Numerous flowering plants resemble ferns, or have fern-like foliage, and some open flowers during nighttime. Some true ferns, like Osmunda regalis, have sporangia in tight clusters (termed "fertile fronds") which may appear in flower-like clusters and so be commonly known as "flowering ferns".

== See also ==
- Blue flower
- St. John's Eve
- Frond dimorphism
