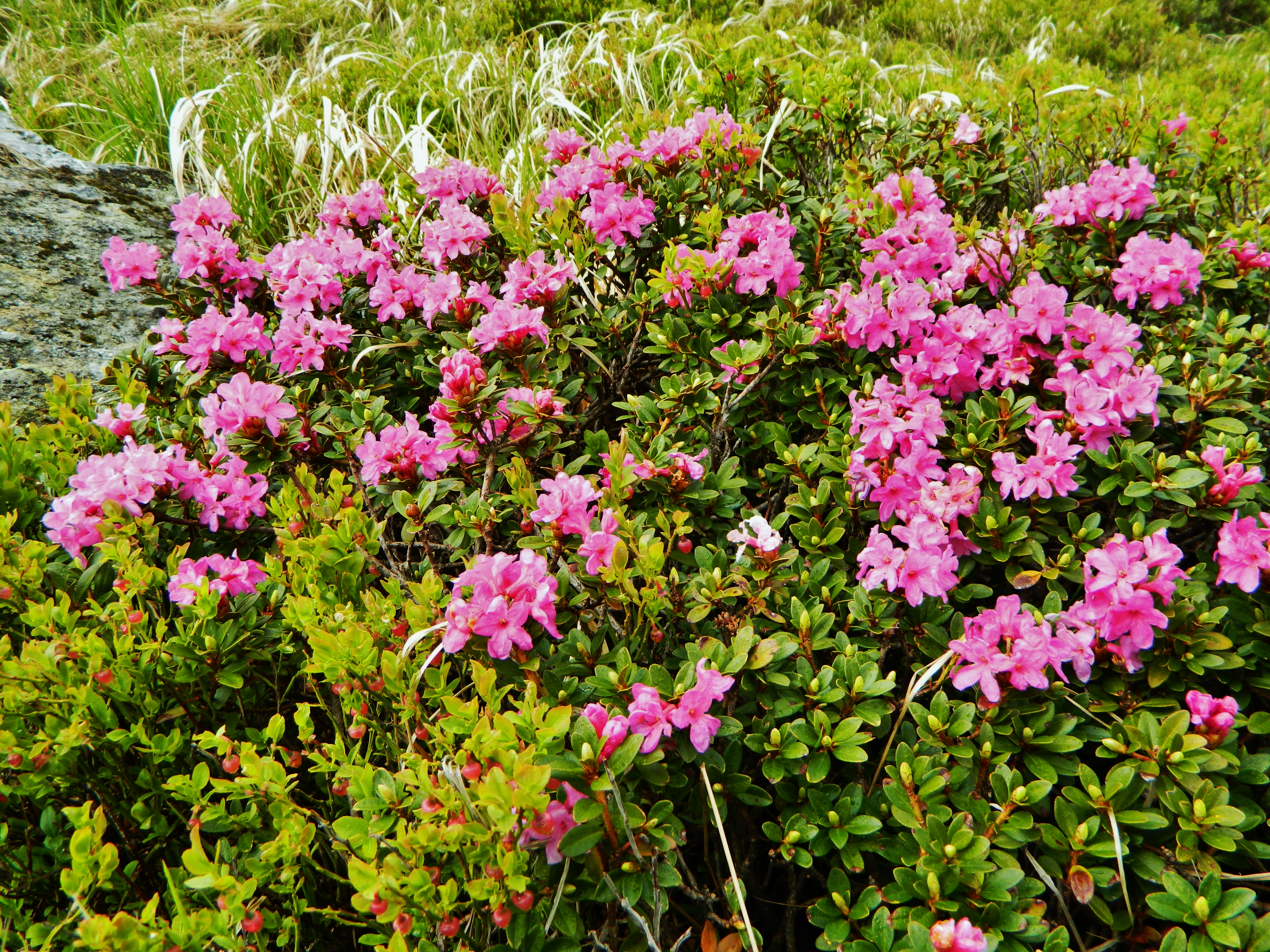

Conservation status
- Endangered (IUCN 3.1)

Scientific classification
- Kingdom: Plantae
- Clade: Tracheophytes
- Clade: Angiosperms
- Clade: Eudicots
- Clade: Asterids
- Order: Ericales
- Family: Ericaceae
- Genus: Rhododendron
- Species: R. myrtifolium

Binomial name
- Rhododendron myrtifolium Schott & Kotschy, 1851

= Rhododendron myrtifolium =

Species of plant

Rhododendron myrtifolium (syn. Rhododendron kotschyi), the myrtle-leaved rhododendron, (Eastern) Carpathian rhododendron, Chervona ruta (Ukrainian: Червона рута) or mountain peony (Romanian: Bujor de munte) is a species of flowering plant in the family Ericaceae. This evergreen shrub is common in some high mountain ranges of Eastern Europe, particularly Bulgaria, Romania and Ukraine.

Rhododendron myrtifolium was first described in 1851 by Schott and Kotschy. It's the only rhododendron species native to the Carpathians and the Balkan Mountains. The species blooms in June-July. It's a close relative of the alpenrose (Rhododendron ferrugineum), replacing it to the east of its range. The main differences are the myrtle-leaved rhododendron shrub's smaller dimensions, hairy pedicels and paler flowers. The two species diverged late, in the late Pliocene and/or Pleistocene.

The myrtle-leaved rhododendron is an endangered and protected relict species in Bulgaria, which is at the southern limit of its distribution area. The species is listed in the Red Book of Bulgaria and Red Book of Ukraine. It grows on the northern slopes of several summits in the Central Balkan National Park, as well as on the northern slope of Belmeken in the Rila National Park. In Bulgaria, it's most commonly found at 2,000–2,500 m (6,600–8,200 ft) above sea level, with smaller habitats down to 1,450 m (4,760 ft).

== Synonyms ==
- Rhododendron ferrugineum (Schott & Kotschy) Hayek 1928
- Rhododendron kotschyi Simonk., 1887

== Gallery ==
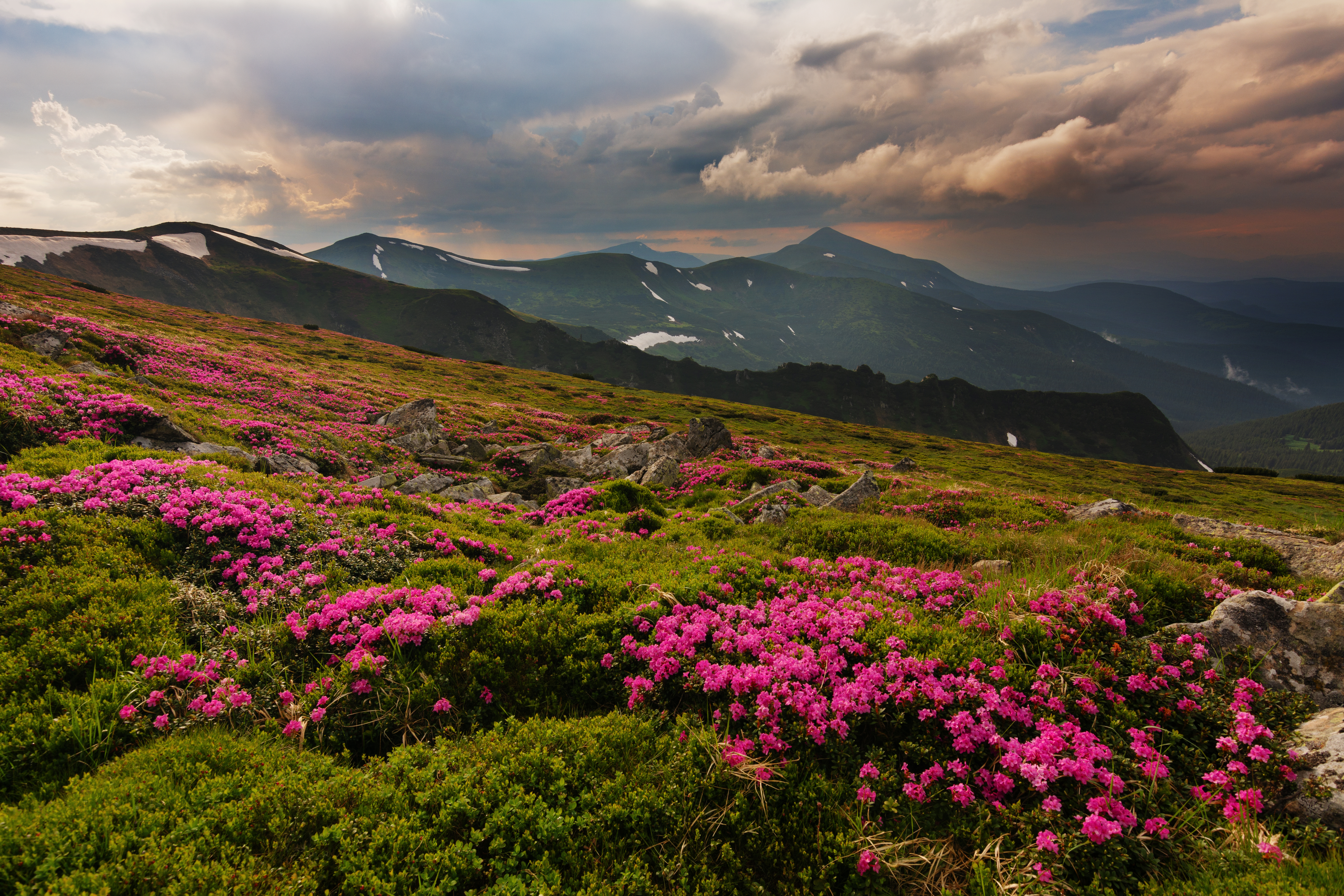

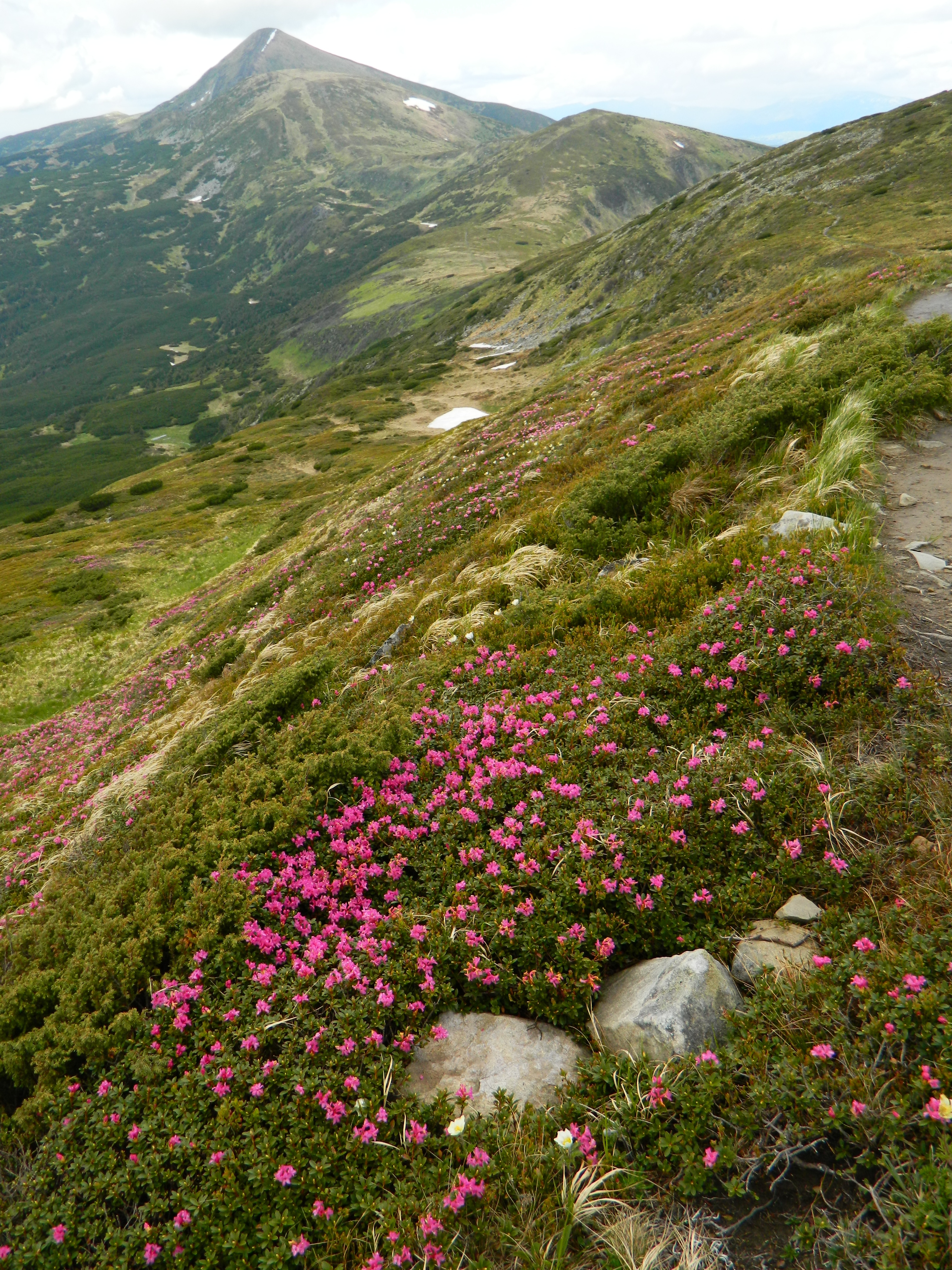

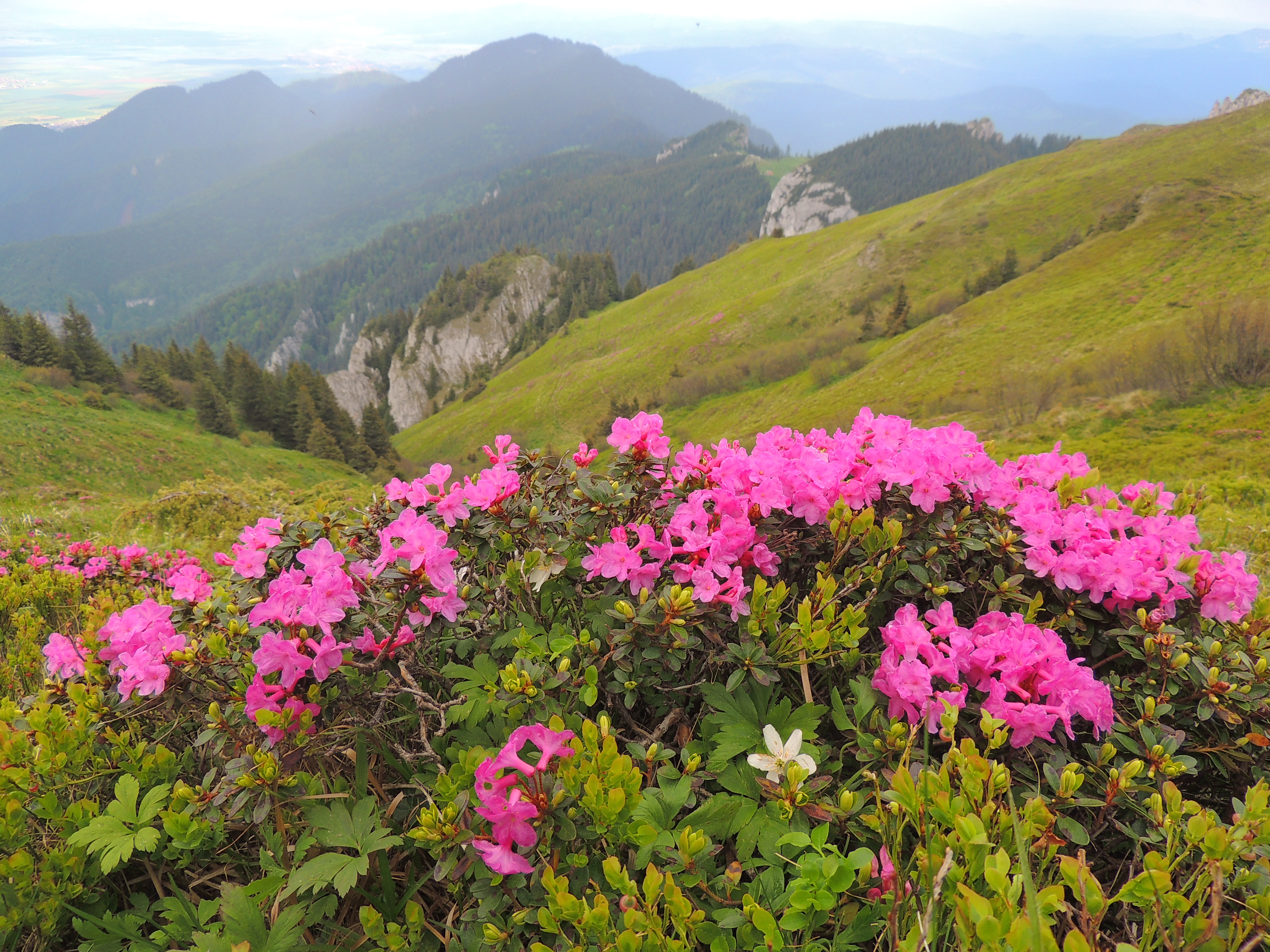

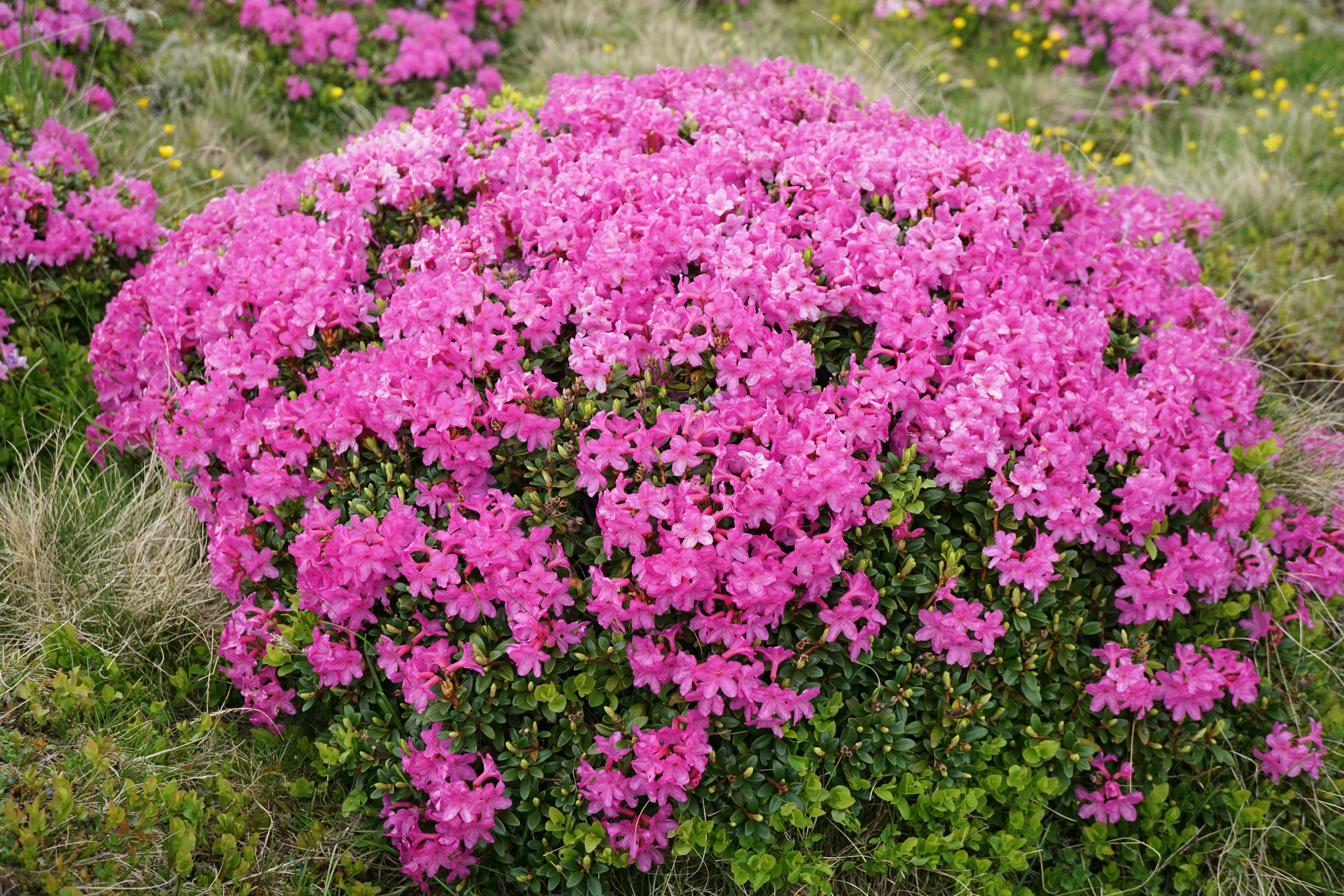

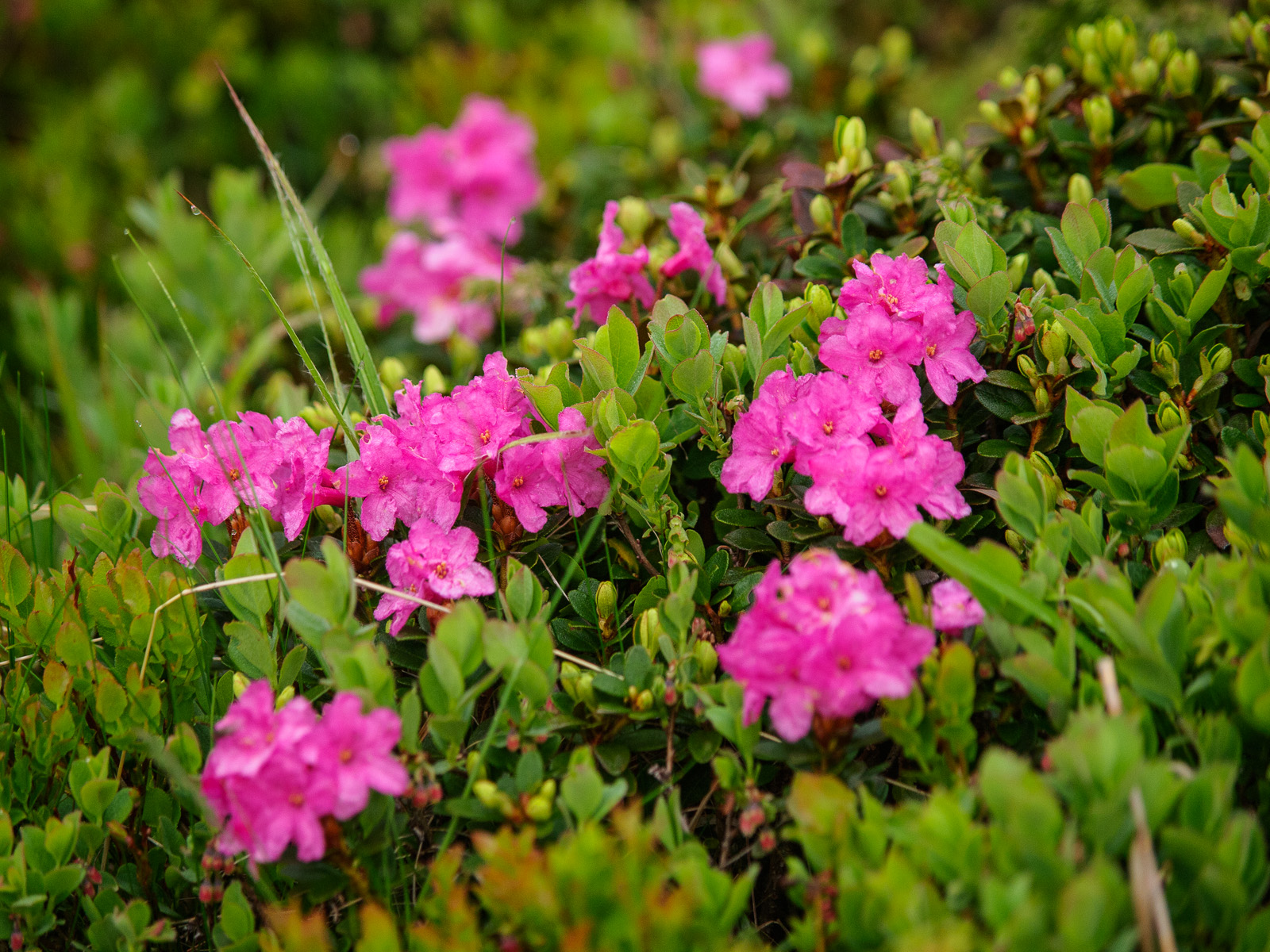

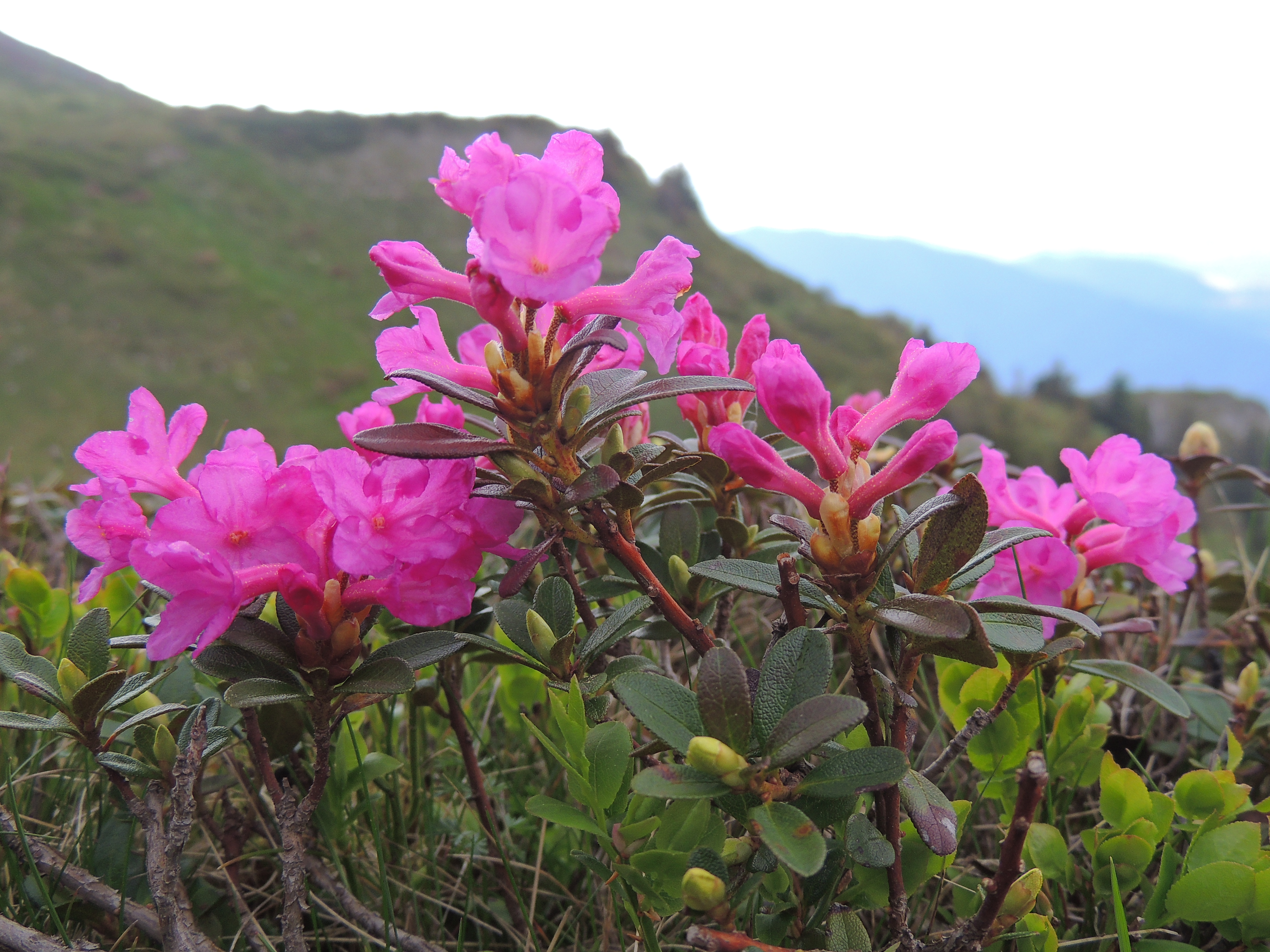

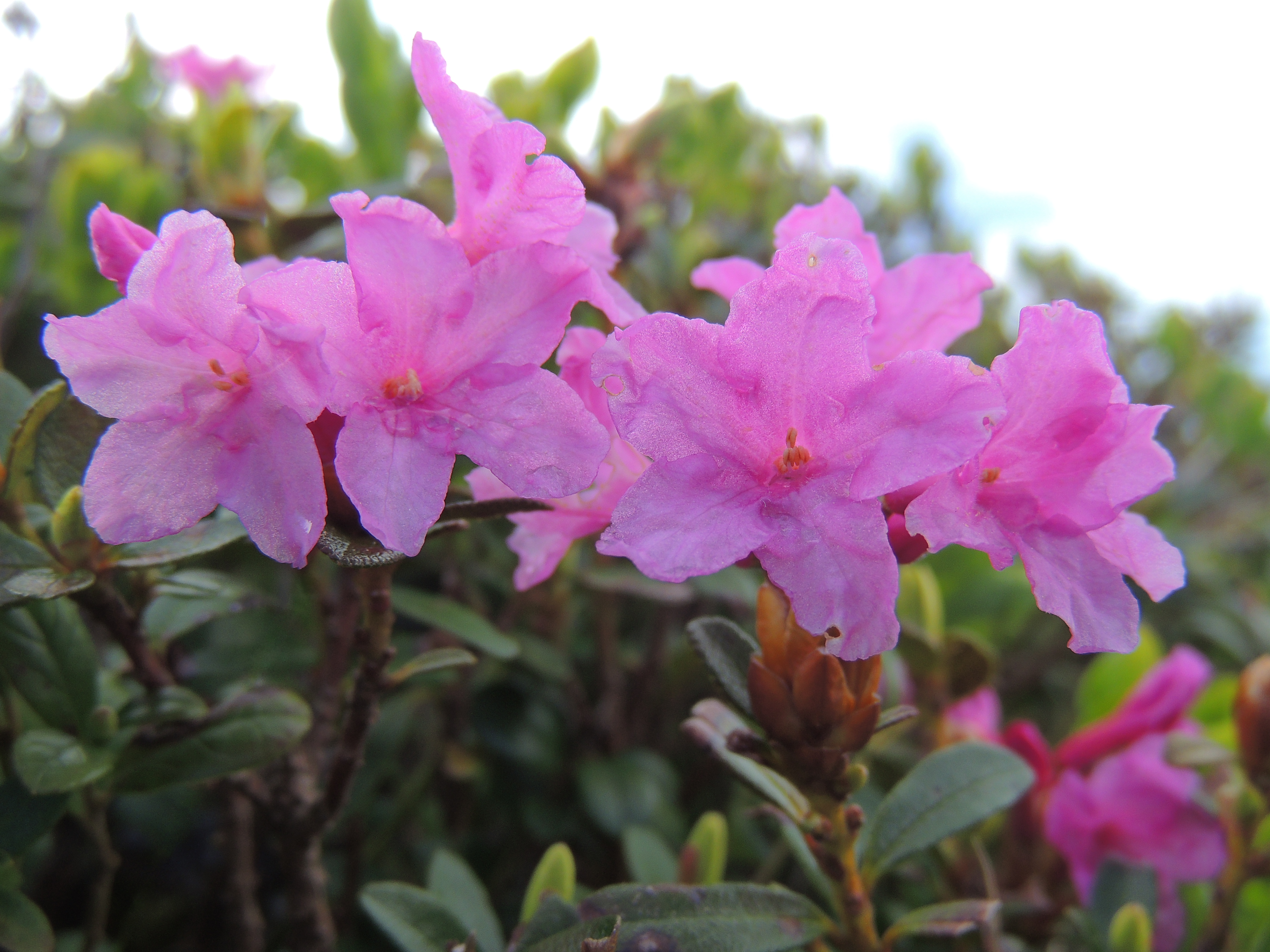
