= Kupala Night =

Traditional Slavic holiday

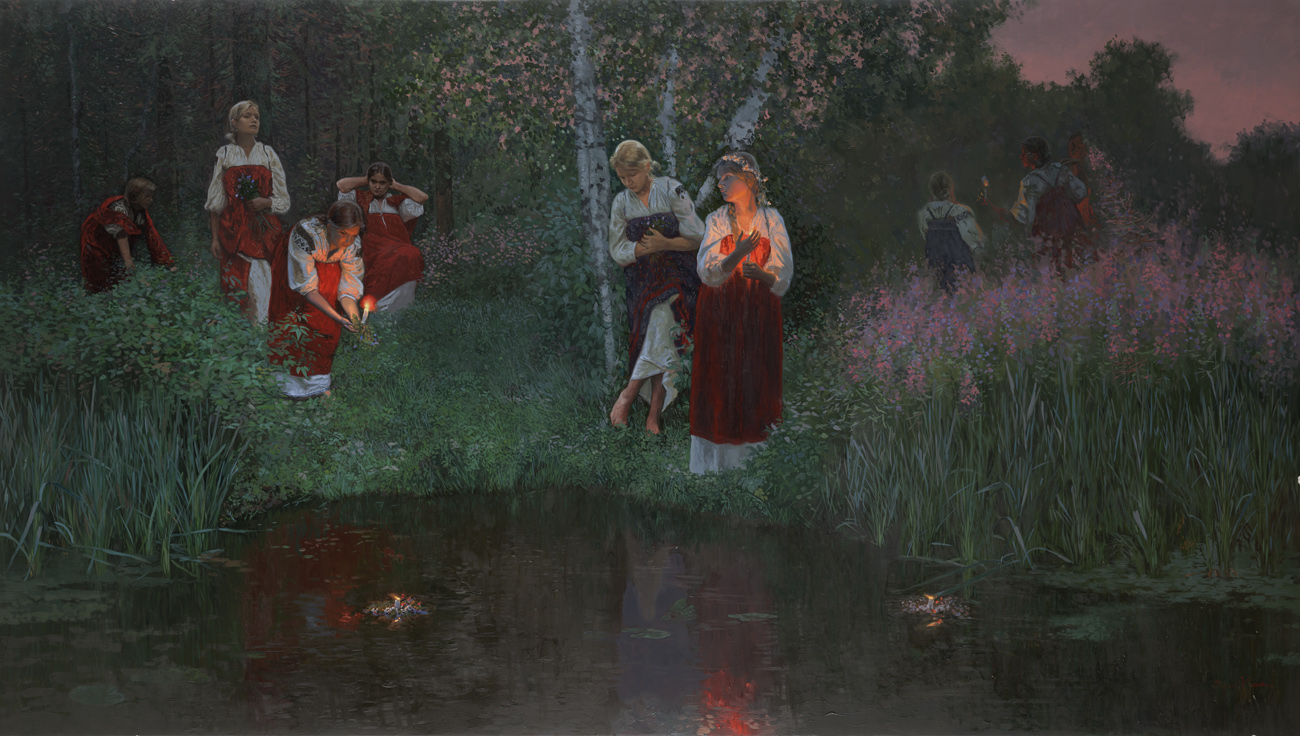
- Ivan Kupala. Fortunetelling on the wreaths, by Simon Kozhin, 2009
- Also called: Kupala's Night, Kupala
- Observed by: Slavs
- Significance: celebration relates to the summer solstice
- Date: 21–22 June or 23–24 June (Poles and Ukrainians); 6–7 July (Belarusians and Russians)
- Frequency: Annual
- Related to: Summer Solstice, Saint John's Eve, Nativity of St. John the Baptist

Kupala Night (also Kupala's Night or just Kupala; Polish: Noc Kupały, Belarusian: Купа́лле: Kupalle, Russian: Ива́н Купа́ла: Ivan Kupala, Купала: Kupala, Ukrainian: Івана Купала: Ivana Kupala) is one of the major folk holidays in some Slavic countries. It coincides with the Christian feast of the Nativity of St. John the Baptist and the East Slavic feast of Saint John's Eve. In folk tradition, it is revered as the day of the summer solstice and was originally celebrated on the shortest night of the year, which is either on 21-22 or 23-24 of June in Czechia, Poland, Slovakia, Bulgaria (where it is called Enyovden). These dates were also adopted in Ukraine as of 2023. Following the Julian calendar, it is celebrated on the night between 6 and 7 July in Belarus, Russia, and parts of Ukraine. The name of the holiday is ultimately derived from the Proto-Slavic word *kǫpati, meaning "to bathe".

A number of activities and rituals are associated with Kupala Night, such as gathering herbs and flowers to decorate people, animals, and houses with; entering natural bodies of water and bathing or dousing oneself in it, as well as setting garlands on the water; lighting and jumping over fires; singing, dancing; and hunting witches and scaring them away. It was also believed that on this day the sun plays and other wonders of nature happen. The celebrations are held near the water, on the hills, surrounding that; chiefly, young men and women participate in these folkloric traditions. The rituals and symbolism of the holiday may point to its pre-Christian origins.

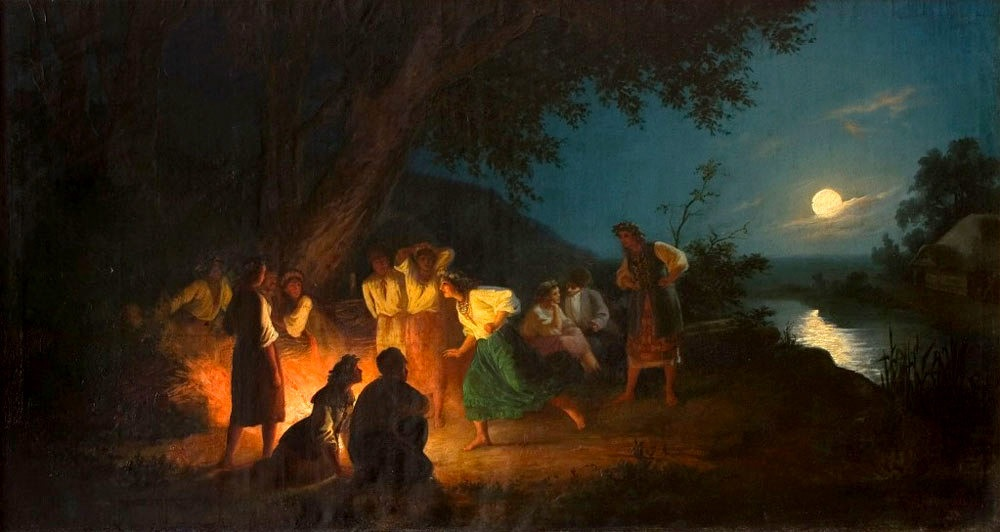
Night on the eve of Ivan Kupala by Polish painter Henryk Siemiradzki, 1880s, Lviv National Art Gallery

== Names ==
- Old East Slavic: kupalija, kupaly pl.
  - Russian: Ivan Kupala, Ivanov denʹ, Kupala, kupala, Kupalo
    - dialectal: kupalni pl.; kupal'nitsa : kupalenka "bonfire in the field"; Yarilo
  - Ukrainian: Ivan Kupalo, Sontsekres, Kupaylo, Kupaylytsa, kupala, kupalen’ka, kupa(y)lochka
    - Polesia: Ivan Petrov, Ivan Petrovny
  - Belarusian: kupalle, Jan Kupała
    - dialectal: kupala

Polish dialects have retained loans from East Slavic languages:

- Podlachia and Lublin: kupała, kąpała, kąpałeczka
- Podlachia, Lublin, Sieradz, Kalisz: kupalonecka, kopernacka, kopernocka, kupalnocka

Another Polish name for this major folk holiday is Sobótka.

In Old Czech (15th century), there is attested kupadlo "a multicolored thread with which gifts were tied, given on the occasion of Saint John's Eve; a gift given to boys by girls on the occasion of Saint John's Eve". In Slovakia, the folk kupadla "Saint John's Eve".

== History and etymology ==
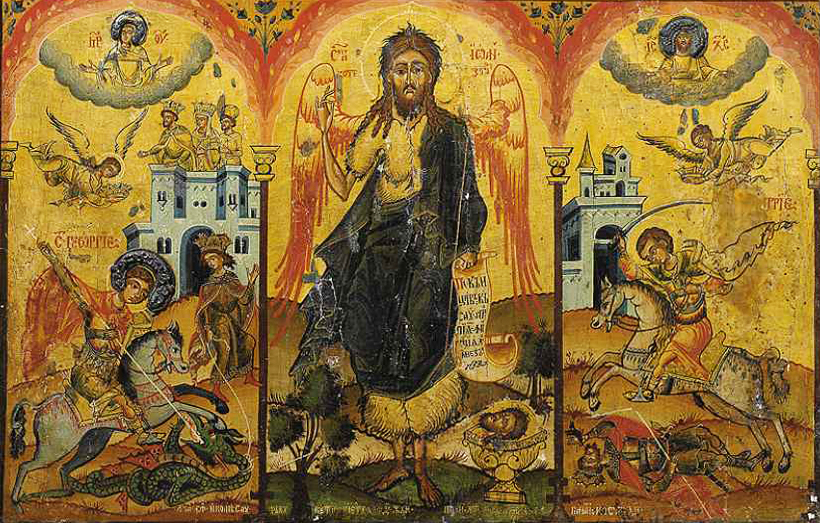
A fragment of a Russian icon symbolizing summer (from left to right): • George the Victorious, on whose day the summer season begins • John the Baptist, on whose day the summer solstice is celebrated • Demetrius of Thessaloniki, on whose day the summer season ends

According to many researchers, Kupala Night is a Christianized Proto-Slavic or East Slavic celebration of the summer solstice. According to Nikolay Gal'kovskiy, "Kupala Night combined two elements: pagan and Christian." The viewpoint on the pre-Christian origin of the holiday is criticized by historian Vladimir Petrukhin and ethnographer Aleksandr Strakhov. Whereas, according to Andrzej Kempinski, "The apparent ambivalence (male-female, fire-wood, light-dark) seems to testify to the ancient origins of the holiday alleviating the contradictions of a dual society." According to Holobuts’ky and Karadobri, one of the arguments for the antiquity of the holiday is the production of fire by friction.

The name appears as early as the Old East Slavic language stage. Izmail Sreznevsky, in his Materials for the Dictionary of the Old East Slavic Language, gives the entries: kupalija "Saint John's Eve" (In Hypatian Codex under year 1262: Litva že izŭgnaša Ezdovŭ na kanunŭ i Ivanę dn:i. na samaję kupalĭję), kupalo "baptist" (no example), kupaly pl. "St. John's Day" (a mirŭ otŭ Pokrova Bogorodicy do Ivana dne do Kupalŭ, a otŭ Ivana dne za dva lětŭ). Epigraph No. 78 in The Cathedral of Holy Wisdom in Veliky Novgorod, dated to the late 11th - early 12th century, contains an inscription Na Kupalię. According to ethnographer Vera Sokolova, Kupala is a later name that appeared among Eastern Slavs when the holiday coincided with the day of John the Baptist.

According to Max Vasmer, the name (Ivan) Kupala/Kupalo is a variant of the name (John the) Baptist (cf. Ukr. Ivan Khrestytel’) and it calques the ancient Greek equivalent (Iōánnēs ho) baptistḗs. Greek baptistḗs "baptist" derives from the verb baptízō "to immerse; to wash; to bathe; to baptize, consecrate, immerse in baptismal font", which in Old East Slavic was originally rendered by the word kǫpati/kupati "to bathe", later displaced by krĭstiti "to baptise". The Proto-Slavic form of the verb is reconstructed as *kǫpati "to dip in water, to bathe".

According to Mel’nychuk, the word Kupalo itself may come from Proto-Slavic *kǫpadlo (cf. OCz. kupadlo, SCr. kùpalo, LSrb., USrb. kupadło "bathing place"), which is composed of the discussed verb *kǫpati and the suffix *-dlo. The name of the holiday is related to the fact that the first ceremonial bath was taken during Kupala Night, and the connection to John the Baptist is secondary.

=== Deity Kupala ===
From the 17th century, sources suggest that the holiday is dedicated to the deity Kupala, whom the Slavs supposedly worshipped. However, modern researchers deny the existence of such a deity.

== Rituals and beliefs ==
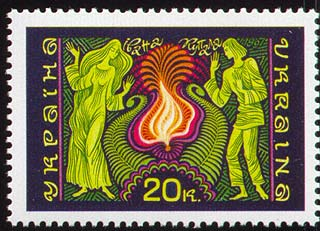
Ivan Kupała, fern flower. (Ukraine stamp), 1997

On this day, June 24, it was customary to pray to John the Baptist for headaches and for children.

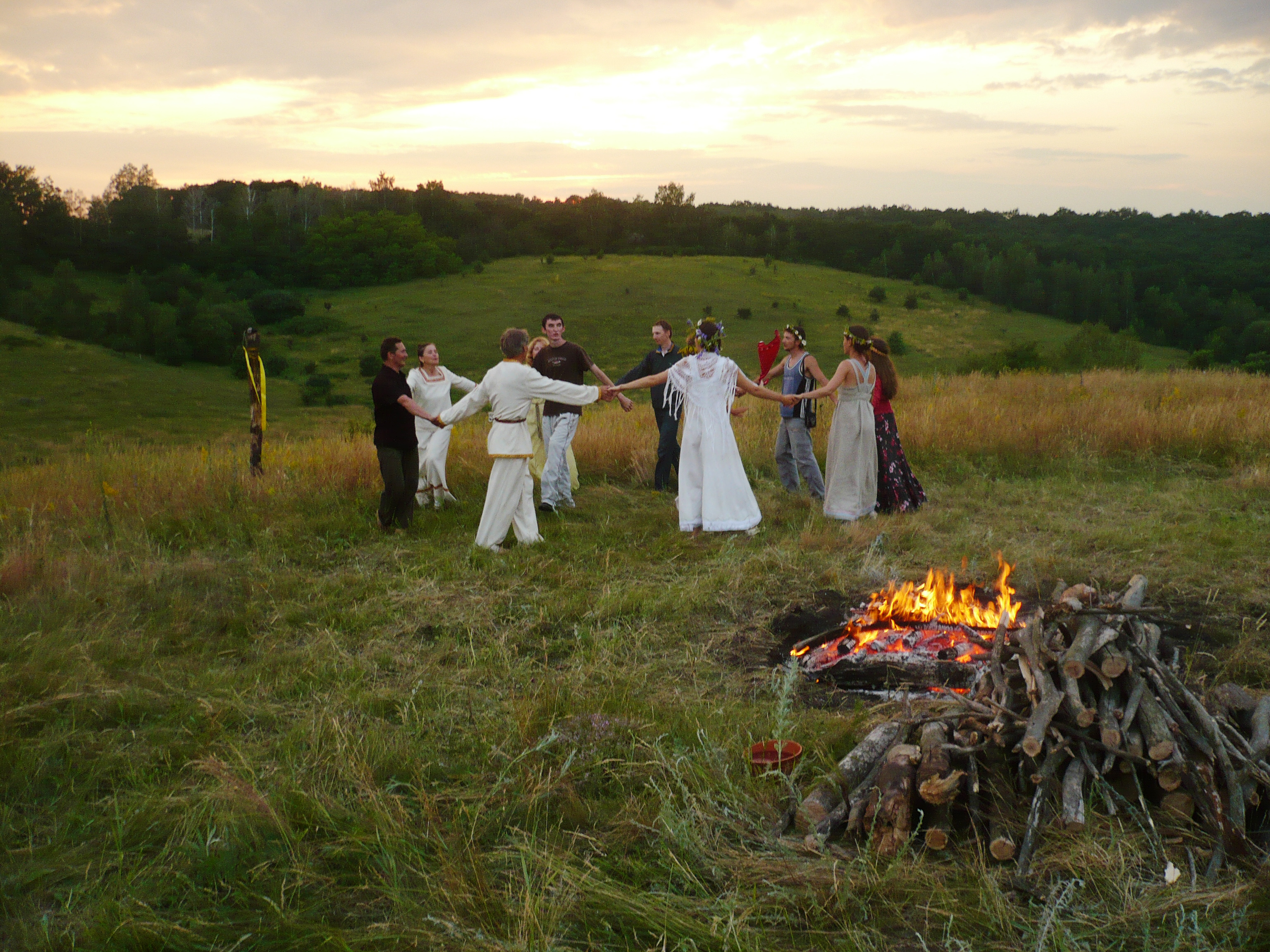
The celebration of Ivan Kupala in Belgorod Oblast, 2011

Kupala Night is filled with rituals related to water, fire and herbs. Most Kupala rituals take place at night. Bathing before sunset was considered mandatory: in the north, Russians were more likely to bathe in banyas, and in the south in rivers and lakes. Closer to sunset, on high ground or near rivers, bonfires were lit. Sometimes, fires were lit in the traditional way – by friction wood against wood. In some places in Belarus and Volyn Polissia, this archaic way of lighting a fire for the holiday survived until early 20th century.

According to Vera Sokolova, among the Eastern Slavs, the holiday has been preserved in its most "archaic" form by the Belarusians. In the center of the Kupala bonfire, Belarusians would place a pole on top of which a wheel was attached. Sometimes a horse's skull, called vidʹma, was placed on top of the wheel and thrown into the fire, where it would burn, after which the youth would play, sing and dance around the fire. In Belarus, old, unwanted items were collected from backyards throughout the village and taken to a place chosen for the celebration (a glade, a high riverbank), where they were then burned. Ukrainians also preserved the main archaic elements, but changed their symbolic meanings in the 19th century. Russians either forgot the main elements of the Kupala ceremony or transferred them to other holidays (Trinity Day, Peter Day).

The celebration of Kupala Night is mentioned in the Hustyn Chronicle (17th century):

This Kupala... is commemorated on the eve of the Nativity of John the Baptist... in the following manner: In the evening, ordinary children of both sexes gather and make wreaths of poisonous herbs or roots, and those covered with their clothes set fire, and then they put a green branch, and holding their hands they dance around the fire, singing their songs... Then they leap over the fire...

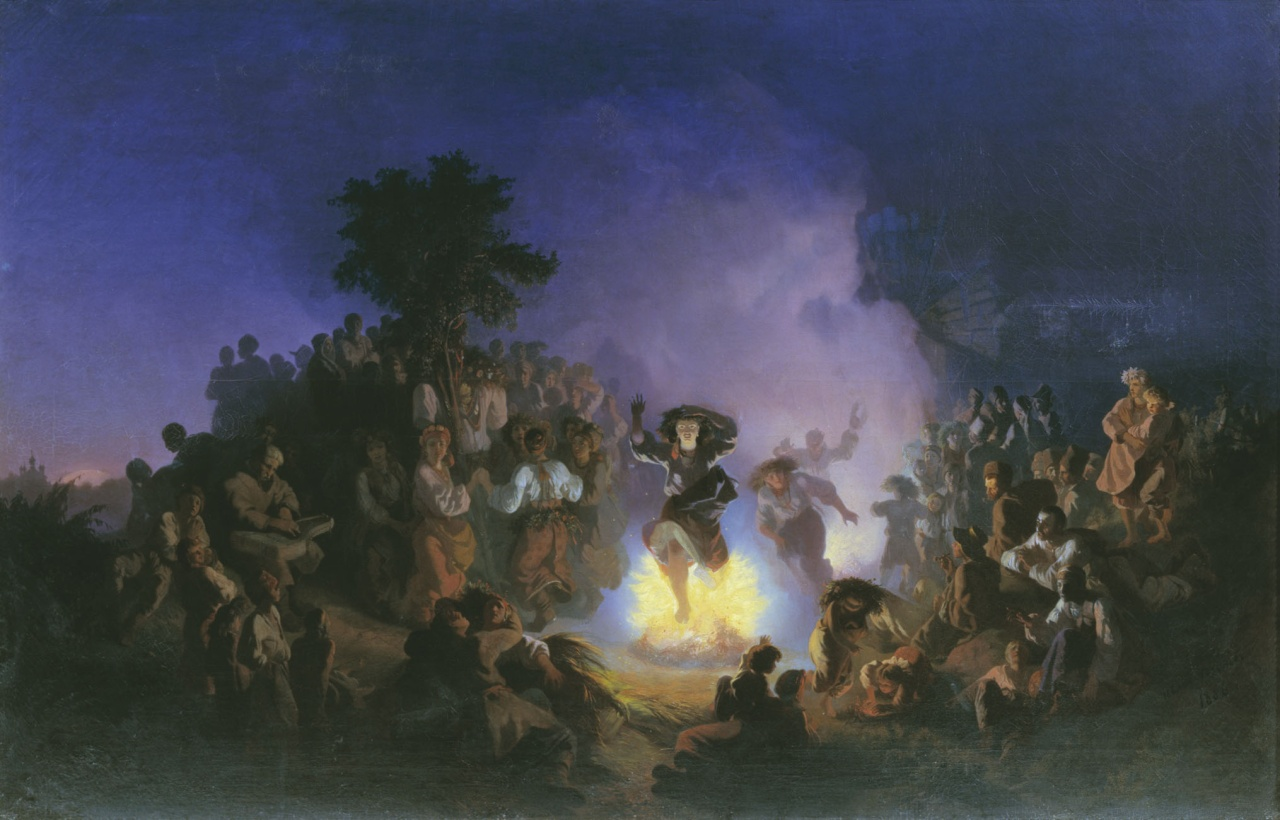
Ivan I. Sokolov, Noch na Ivana Kupalu, 1856

On Kupala Night, "bride and groom" were chosen and wedding ceremonies were conducted: they jumped over the fire holding hands, exchanged wreaths (symbol of maidenhood), looked for the fern flower and bathed in the morning dew. On this day, "village roads were plowed so that 'matchmakers would come sooner', or a furrow was plowed to a boy's house so that he would get engaged faster."

In some parts of Ukrainian and Belarusian tradition, it was only after Kupala that vesnianky were no longer sung. Eastern and Western Slavs were forbidden to eat cherries before that day. Eastern Slavs believed that women should not eat berries before St. John's Day, or their young children would die.

The custom of public condemnation and ridicule on Kupala Night (also George's Day in Spring and Trinity Day) is well known. Criticism and condemnation are usually directed at residents of one's own or a neighboring village who have violated social and moral norms over the past year. This social condemnation can be heard in Ukrainian and Belarusian songs, which contain themes of quarrels between girls and boys or residents of neighboring villages. Condemnation and ridicule are expressed in public and serve as a regulator of social relations.

According to Hutsuls beliefs, after Kupala come the "rowan nights", when thunders and lightnings are common. These are days when thunderous spirits walk around, sending lightning bolts to the earth. "And then between the dark sky and the tops of the mountains, fire trees grow, connecting heaven and earth. And so it will be until the Elijah's day, the old Thunderous feast" after which, they say, "thunder will stop pounding."

Alexander Veselovsky, points out the similarity between the Slavic customs of Kupala Night and the Greek customs of Elijah's day, (Elijah the Thunderer).

=== Ritual dishes ===
The consecration of the first fruits ripening at this time may have coincided with the Kupala Night holiday.

In some Russian villages, "votive porridge" was brewed: on St. Juliana's day (June 22), girls would gather to talk and, while singing, pound barley in a mortar. On the morning of St. Agrippina's day (June 23), barley was used to cook votive porridge. During the day, this porridge was given to the poor, and in the evening, sprinkled with butter, it was eaten by everyone.

Among Belarusians, delicacies brought from home were eaten both in separate groups and at potluck and consisted of vareniki, cheese, tvarog, flour porridge (kulaha), sweet dough (babka) with ground hemp seeds, onion, garlic, bread acid (cold borscht), and eggs in lard. In Belarus in the 19th century, vodka was drunk during the holiday, and wine was drunk in Podlachia and the Carpathians. Songs have preserved mention of the ancient drinks of the night:

Will accept you, Kupal’nochka, as a guest,
With treating you with green vine,
With watering you with wheat beer,
With feeding you with quark.

=== Water ===
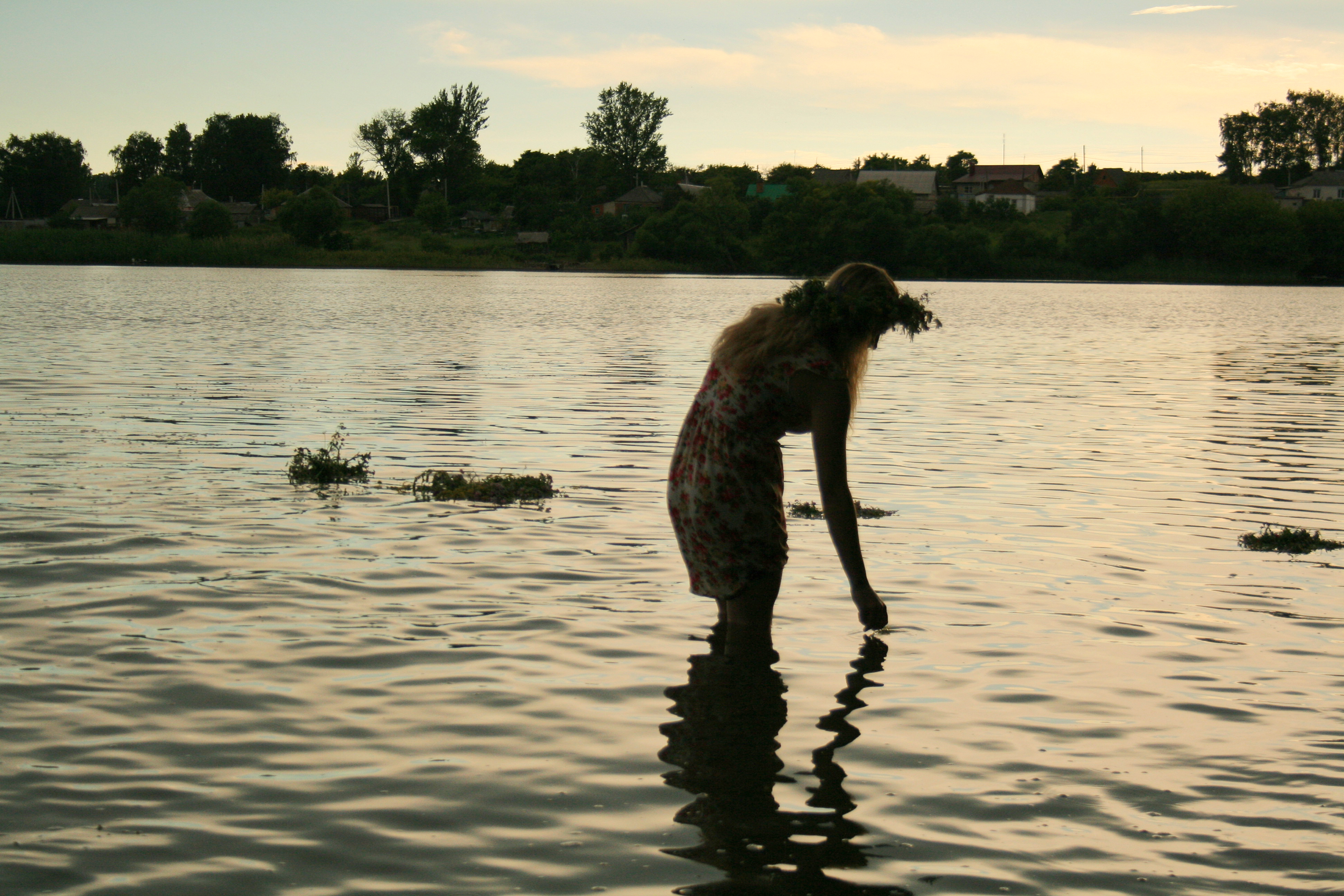
Divination on wreaths

The obligatory custom on this day was mass bathing. It was believed that on this day all evil spirits would leave the rivers, so it was safe to swim until Elijah's day. In addition, the water of Kupala Night was endowed with revitalizing and magical properties.

In places where people were not allowed to bathe in rivers (because of russets), they bathed in "sacred springs". In the Russian North, on the day before of Kupala Night, on St. Agrippina's Day, baths were heated in which people were washed and steamed, while steaming the herbs collected on that day. Water drawn from springs on St. John's Day was said to have miraculous and magical powers.

On this holiday, according to a common sign, water can "make friends" with fire. The symbol of this union was a bonfire lit along the banks of rivers. Wreaths were often used for divination on Kupala Night: if they floated on the water, it meant good luck and long life or marriage.

A 16th-century Russian scribe attempted to explain the name (Kupalnica) and the healing power of St. John's Day by referring to the Old Testament legend of Tobias. As he writes, it was on this day that Tobias bathed in the Tigris, where, on the advice of the archangel Raphael, he discovered a fish whose entrails cured his father of blindness.

=== Bonfire ===
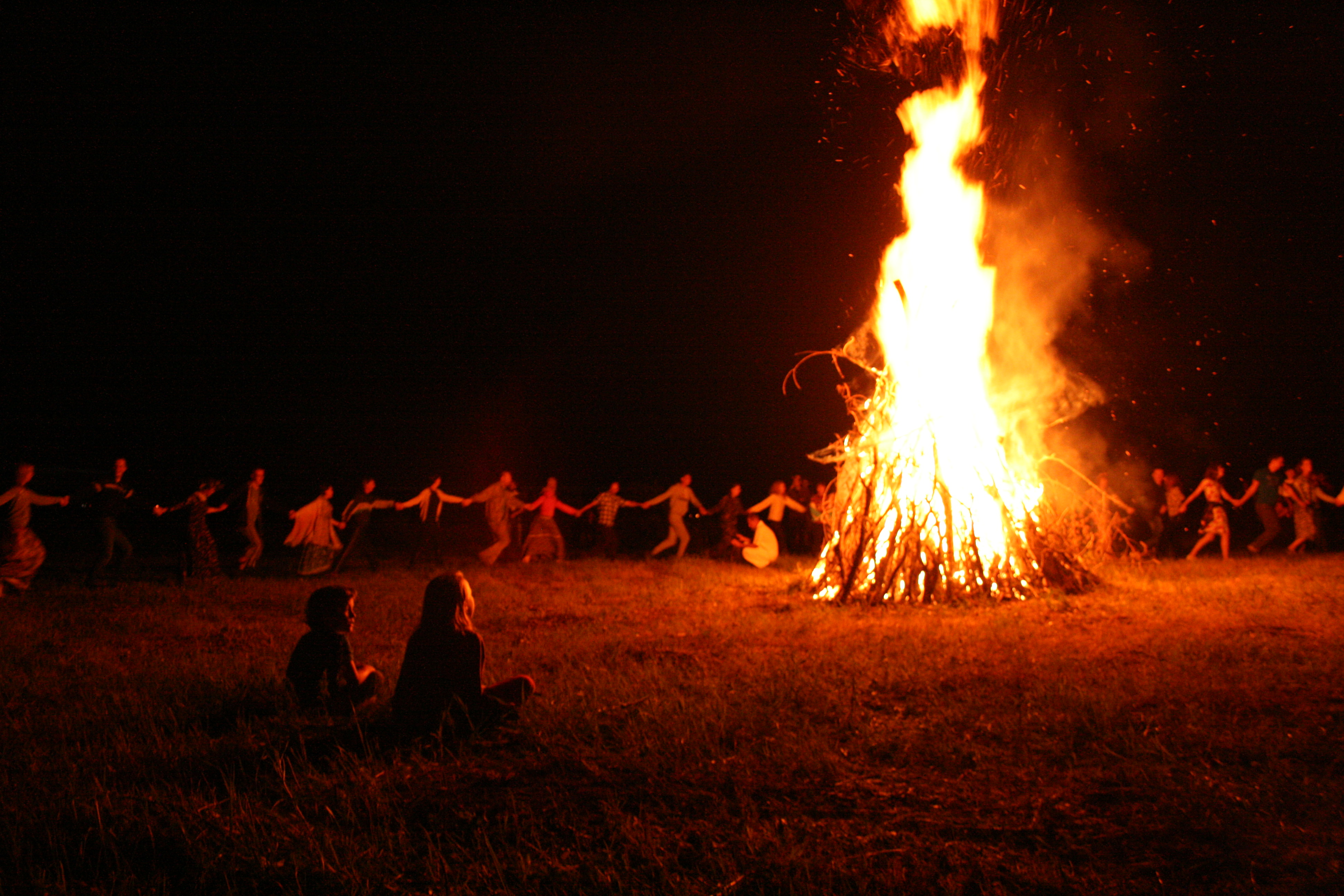
Kupala bonfire

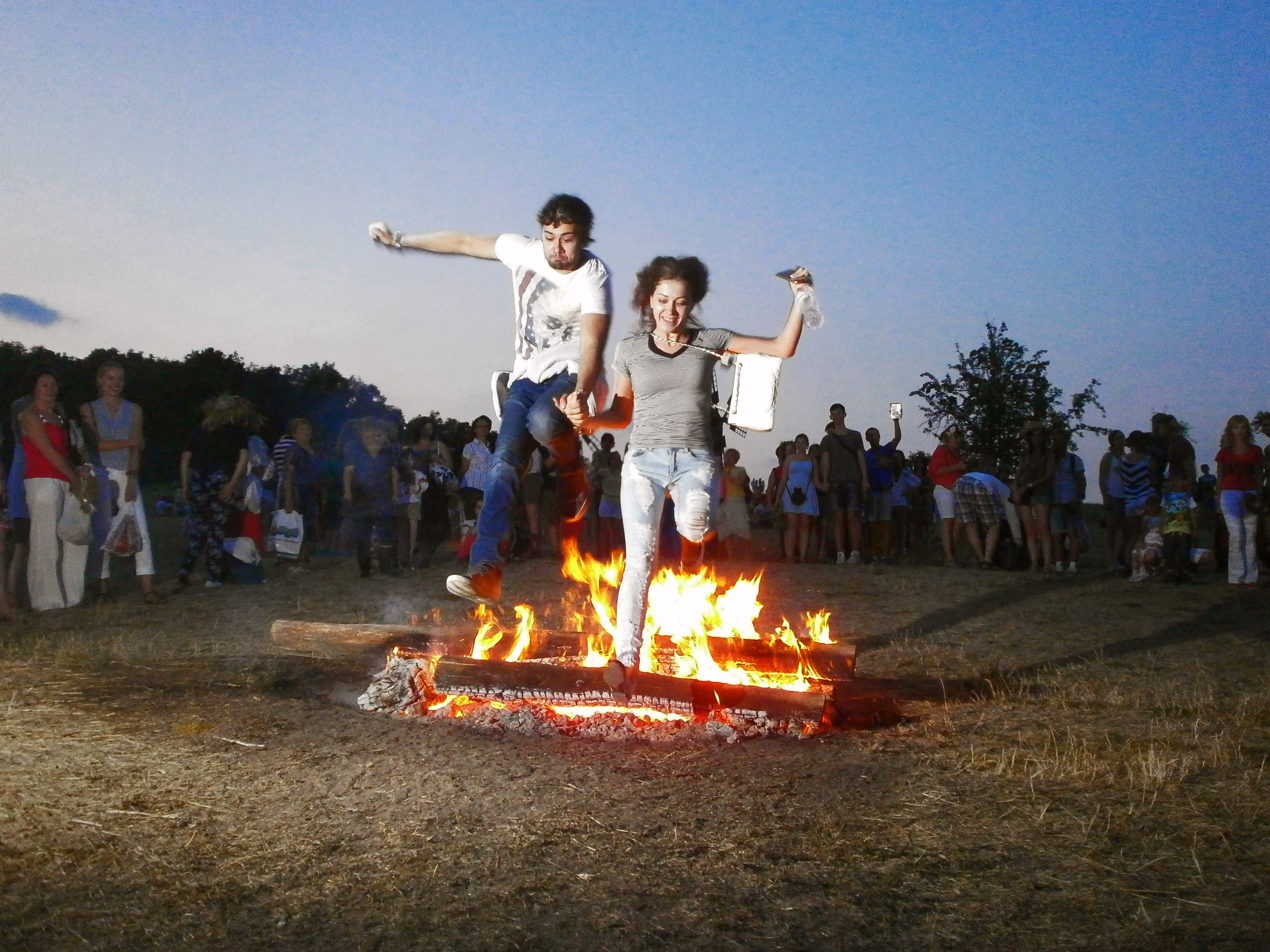
Couple jumping over a bonfire in Pyrohiv, Ukraine

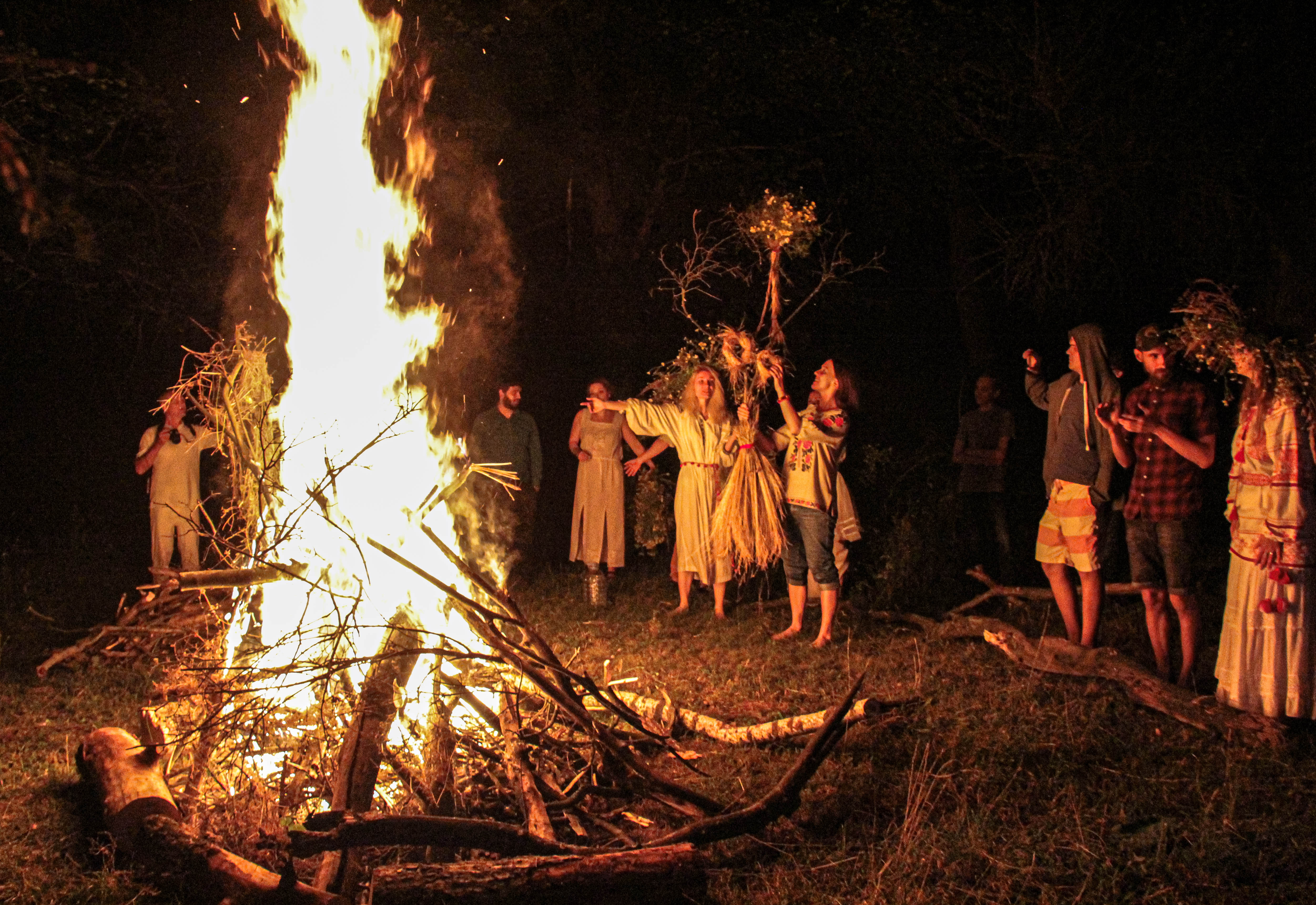
Kupala Night bonfire in Ternopil, 2008

The main feature of the Kupala Night is the cleansing bonfires. The youths would bring down a huge amount of brushwood from all over the village and set up a tall pyramid, with a pole in the middle, on which was placed a wheel, a barrel of tar, a horse or cow skull (Polesia), etc. According to Tatyana Agapkin and Lyudmila Vinogradova, the symbol of a tall pole with a wheel attached to it generally correlated with the universal image of the world tree.

Bonfires were lit late in the evening and usually burned until morning. In various traditions, there is evidence of the requirement to light the Kupala bonfire with "need-fire", produced by friction; in some places, the fire was carried into the house and lit in the earth. All the women of the village had to approach the fire, since any who did not go were suspected of witchcraft. A khorovod was led around the bonfire, dancing, singing Kupala songs, and jumping over the bonfire: whoever jumps more successfully and higher will be happier. The girls leap over the fire to "purify themselves and protect themselves from disease, spoilage, spells," and so that "rusalky will not attack and come during the year." A girl who did not jump over the fire was called a witch (Eastern Slavs, Poland); she was doused with water and scourged with nettles because she had not been "cleansed" by the baptismal fire. In the Kiev Governorate, a girl who lost her virginity before marriage could not jump over the bonfire during Kupala Night, as doing so would desecrate it.

In Ukraine and Belarus, girls and boys held hands and jumped over the fire in pairs. It was believed that if their hands stayed together while jumping, it would be a clear sign of their future marriage; the same if sparks flew behind them. In the Gomel Governorate, boys used to cradle girls in their arms over the Kupala bonfire to protect them from spells. Young people and children jumped over bonfires, organized noisy games: they played gorelki.

In addition to bonfires, in some places on Kupala Night, wheels and barrels of tar were set on fire, which were then rolled down the mountains or carried on poles, which is clearly related to the symbolism of the solstice.

In Belarus, the Galician Poles and Carpathian Slovaks called baptismal bonfires Sobótki after the West Slavic sobota as a "day of rest".

=== Kupala songs ===
Many folklorists believe that the content of Kupala songs is poorly related to the rituals and mythological meaning of the holiday. The multi-genre song texts include many lyrical songs with love and family themes, humorous chants between boys and girls, khorovod dance songs and games, ballads, etc. As Kupala songs, these are identified by specific melodies and a specific calendar period. In other periods, it was not customary to sing such songs.

=== Wreath ===
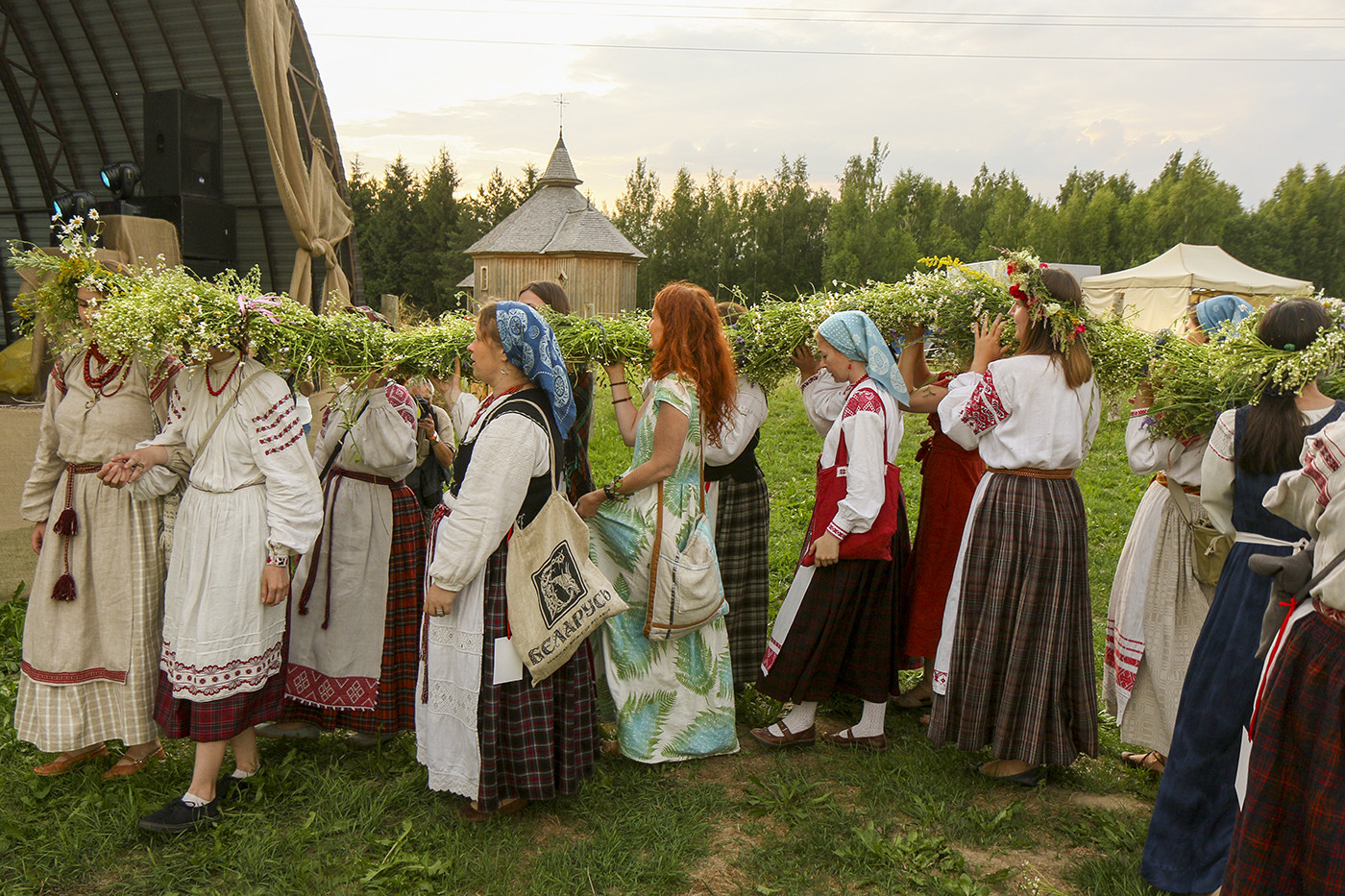
Procession of Kupala in Belarus in 2019

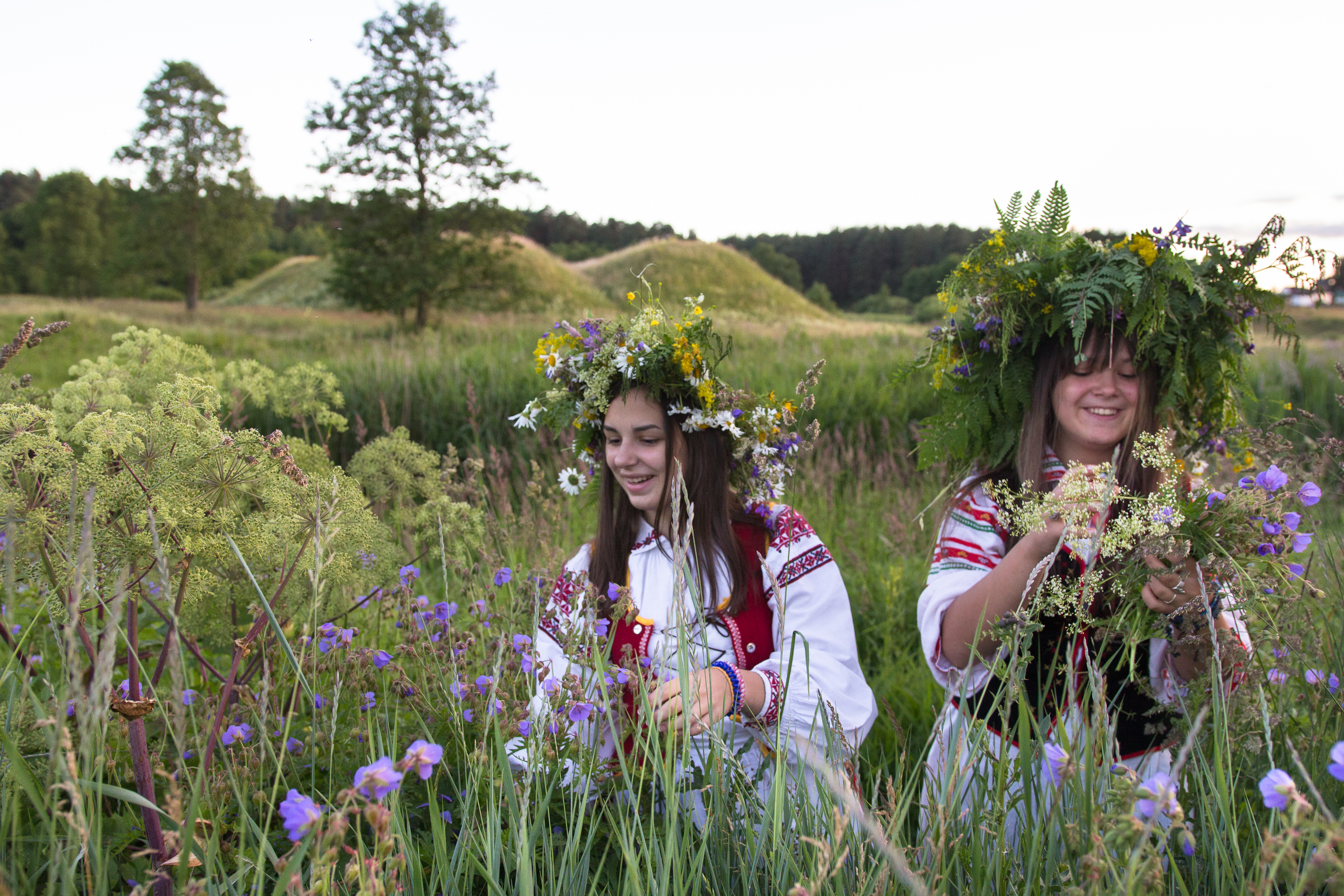
Gathering flowers for wreaths before Kupala Night celebration

The wreath was a mandatory attribute of the amusements. It was made before the holiday from wild herbs and flowers. The ritual use of the Kupala wreath is also related to the magical understanding of its shape, which brings it closer to other round and perforated objects (ring, hoop, loaf, etc.). The customs of milking or sipping milk through the wreath, reaching and pulling something through the wreath, looking, pouring, drinking, washing through it are based on these attributes of the wreath.

It was believed that each plant gave the wreath special properties, and the way it was made — twisting and weaving — also added symbolism. Wreaths were often made of periwinkle, basil, geranium, ferns, roses, blackberries, oak and birch branches, etc.

During the festival, the wreath was usually destroyed: thrown into water, burned in a bonfire, thrown on a tree or the roof of a house, carried to a cemetery, etc. Sometimes the wreath was preserved and used for healing, protecting fields from hailstorms and vegetable gardens from "worms".

In Polesia, at the dawn of St. John's Day, peasants would choose the prettiest girl from among themselves, strip her naked and wrap her from head to toe in wreaths of flowers, then go to the forest, where the "dzevko-kupalo" (girl-kupalo – as the chosen girl was called) would distribute the previously prepared wreaths to her girlfriends. She would blindfold herself, and the girls would walk around her in a merry dance. The garland that someone received was used to foretell future fate: a fresh garland meant a rich and happy marriage, a dry garland meant poverty and an unhappy marriage: "she will not have happiness, she will live in misery."

=== Kupala tree ===
Depending on the region, a young birch, willow, maple, spruce, or the cut top of an apple tree was chosen for the Kupala. The girls would decorate it with wreaths, field flowers, fruits, ribbons and sometimes candles; then take it outside the village, stick it in the ground in a clearing and dance, walk and sing around it. Later, the boys would join in the fun, pretending to steal the Kupala tree or ornaments from it, knocking it over or setting it on fire, while the girls protected it. At the end, everyone together was supposed to drown the Kupala tree in the river or burn it in a bonfire.

Before the ritual, the tree could not be cut down, but simply located in a convenient place for the khorovod and dressed. In the Zhytomyr region, in one village, a dry pine tree, growing outside the village near the river, was chosen for this; it was called hil’tse. The celebrants threw the burnt tree trunk into the water, and then ran away so that "the witch (didn't) catch up with them."

=== Medicinal and magical herbs ===
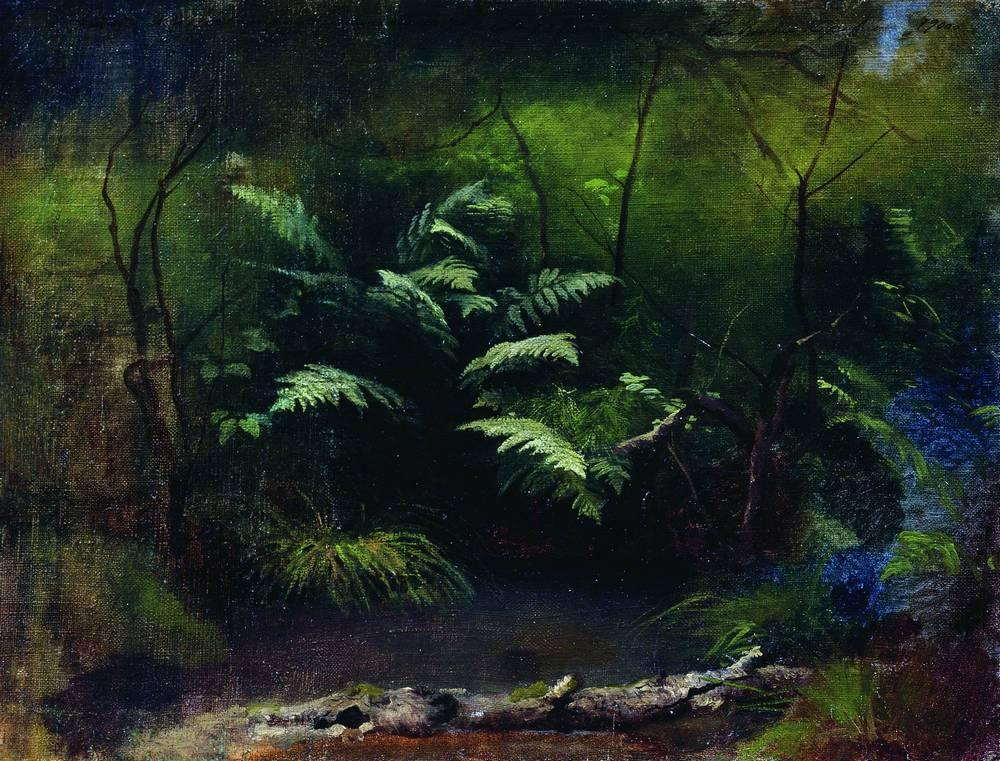
Isaac I. Levitan, Paporotniki u vody, 1895

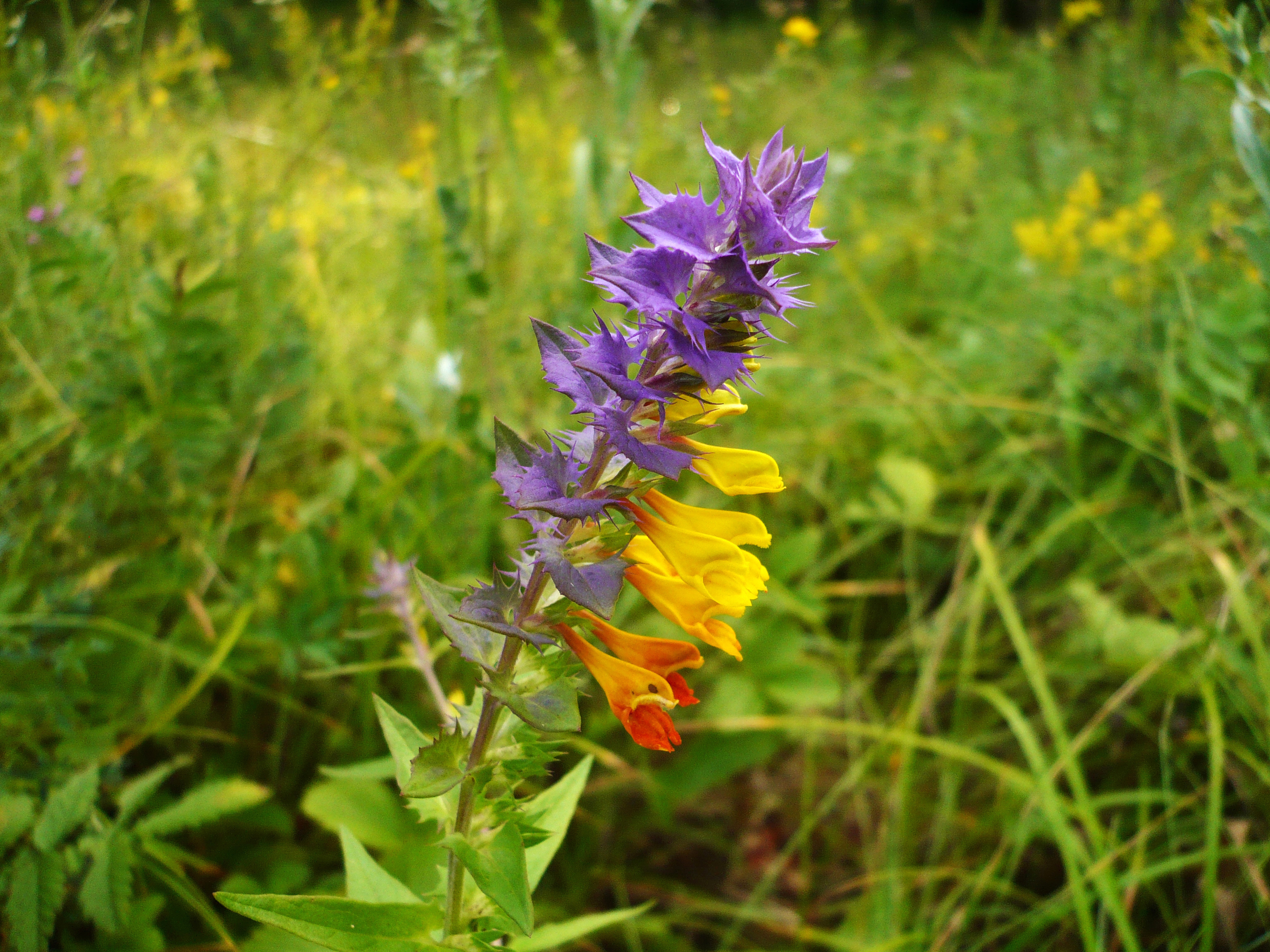
Ivan-da-marya – Melampyrum nemorosum

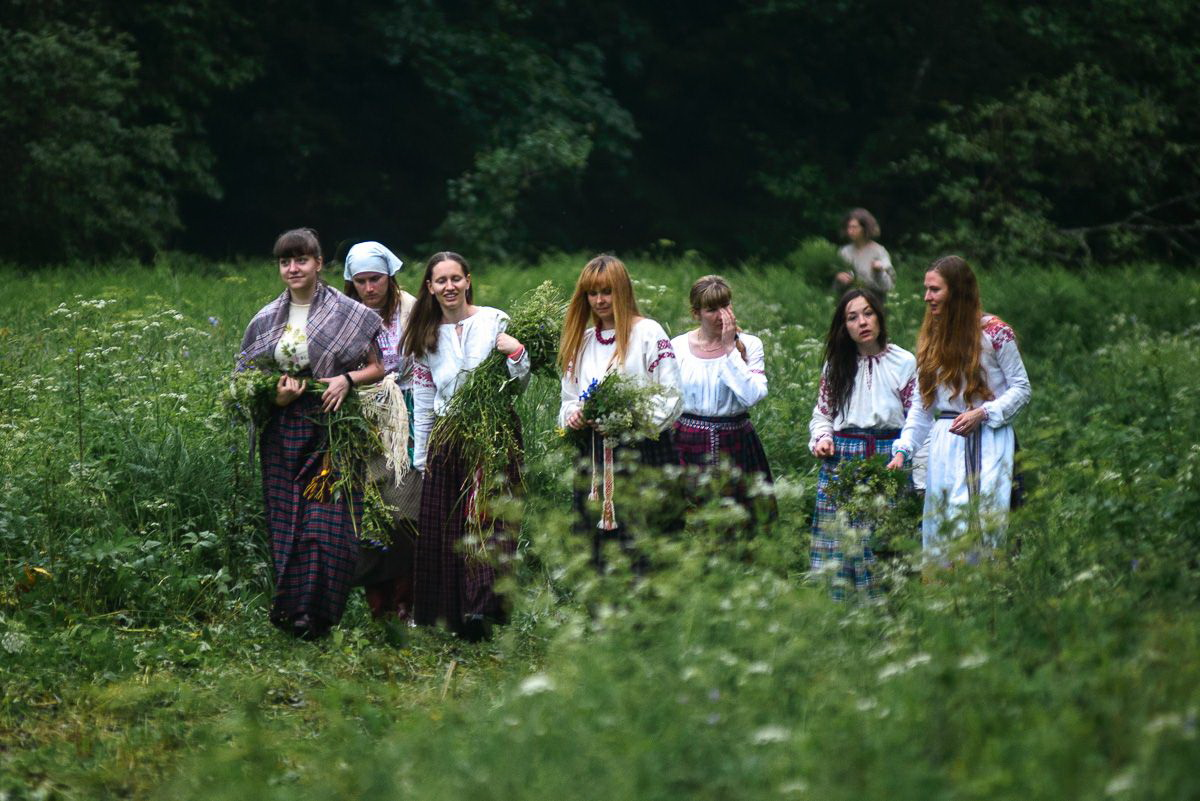
The women are collecting herbs

A characteristic sign of Kupala Night are the many customs and legends associated with the plant world. Green was used as a universal amulet: it was believed to protect from diseases and epidemics, evil eye and spoilage; from sorcerers and witches, unclean powers, "walking" dead people; from natural lightning, hurricane, fire; from snakes and predatory animals, insect pests, worms. At the same time, the contact with fresh greens was conceived as a magical means providing fertility and successful breeding of cattle, poultry, yield of cereals and vegetable crops.

It was believed that on this day it was best to collect medicinal herbs, as the plants receive great power from the sun and the earth. Some herbs were harvested at night, others in the afternoon before lunch, and others in the morning dew. While collecting medicinal herbs, a special prayer (zagovory) was recited.

According to Belarusian beliefs, Kupala herbs are most healing if they are collected by the "old and young," i.e. old people and children – as the most pure (no sex life, no menstruation, etc.).

The fern and the so-called Ivan-da-marya flower (e.g., Melampyrum nemorosum; literally: John and Mary) were associated with special Kupala legends. The names of these plants appear in Kupala songs.

The Slavs believed that only once a year, on St. John's Day, a fern blooms. This mythical flower, which does not exist in nature, is supposed to give those who pick it and keep it with them miraculous powers. According to beliefs, the bearer of the flower becomes clairvoyant, can understand the language of animals, see all treasures, no matter how deep they are in the ground, and enter treasuries unhindered by holding the flower to locks and bolts (they must crumble before it), wield unclean spirits, wield earth and water, become invisible and take any form.

One of the main symbols of St. John's Day was the Ivan-da-marya flower, which symbolized the magical combination of fire and water. Kupala songs link the origin of this flower to twins – a brother and sister – who got into a forbidden love affair and because of this turned into a flower. The story of incestuous twins finds numerous parallels in Indo-European mythologies.

Some plant names are related to the name Kupala, e.g. Czech kupadlo "Bromus", "Cuscuta trifolii", kupalnice "Ranunculus", Polish kupalnik "Arnica", Ukrainian dial. kupala "Taraxacum officinale", "Tussilago", Russian kupalo "Ranunculus acris".

=== Protection from evil spirits ===
It was believed that on the Kupala Night all evil spirits awaken to life and harm people; that one should beware of "the mischief of demons – domovoy, vodyanoy, leshy, rusalky".

In order to prevent witches from "taking away" milk from cows, Russians pounded consecrated willow in pastures, and in Ukraine the owner pounded aspen stakes in the yard. In Polesia, nettles, torn men's pants or a mirror was hung in the stable gate for the same purpose. In Belarus, aspen twigs and stakes were used to defend not only cattle, but also crops, "so that witches would not take the spores." To ward off evil spirits, it was customary to hammer sharp and prickly objects into tables, windows, doors, etc. In the Eastern Slavs, when a witch entered the house, a knife was driven into the table from below to prevent her from leaving. Southern Slavs believed that sticking a knife or hawthorn branch into the door would protect them from vampires or nightmares. On Kupala night, Eastern Slavs would drive scythes, pitchforks, knives and branches of certain trees into the windows and doors of houses and barns, protecting their space from evil spirits.

It was believed that in order to protect oneself from witch attacks, one should put nettles on the threshold and window sills. Ukrainian girls collected wormwood because they believed it was feared by witches and russets.

In Podolia, on St. John's Day, hemp flowers ("porridge") were collected and scattered in front of the entrances to houses and barns to bar the way for witches. In order to prevent the witches from stealing them and driving them to Bald Mountain (no horse will return from there alive), the horses must be locked up. Belarusians believed that during Kupala Night, domoviks would ride horses and torture them.

In Ukraine and Belarus, magical powers were attributed to firebrands from the Kupala bonfire. In western Polesia, young people would pull the sails from the fire, run with them as if they were torches, wave them over their heads, and then throw them into the fields "to protect the crops from evil powers."

In Polesia, a woman who did not come to the bonfire was called a witch by the youth, cursed and teased. In order to identify and neutralize the witch, the road along which cattle are usually herded was blocked with thread, plowed with a plow or harrow, sprinkled with seeds or ants and poured with ant stock, believing that the witch's cow would not be able to overcome the obstacle.

According to Slavic beliefs, the root of Lythrum salicaria dug up on St. John's Day was able to ward off sorcerers and witches; it could be used to drive demons out of the possessed and possessors.

=== Youth games ===
The games usually had a love-marriage theme: gorelki, tag, korshun, celovki; ball games (myachevukha, v baryshi and others).

=== Ritual pranks ===
On the night of Kupala, as well as on one of the nights during the winter Christmas holidays, among Eastern Slavs, youngsters often engaged in ritual mischief and pranks: they stole firewood, carts, gates and hoisted them onto roofs, propped up house doors, covered windows, etc. Pranks on Kupala night are a South Russian and Polesian tradition.

=== Sun ===
It is a well-known belief that on St. John's Eve, the sun at sunrise shimmers with different colors or reflects, flashes, stops, etc. The most common way of referring to this phenomenon is as follows: the sun plays or jumps; in some traditions it also bathes, jumps, dances, walks, trembles, is merry, spins, bows, changes, blooms, beautifies (Russia); the sun Crowing (Polesia).

In some parts of Bulgaria, it is believed that at dawn on St. John's Day, three suns appear in the sky, of which only the central one is "ours" and the others are its brothers – shining at other times and over other lands.

The Serbs called John the Baptist Sveti Jovan Igritelj because they believed that on this day the sun stops three times in the sky or plays. They explained the behavior of the sun on John's day by referring to Gospel verses relating to the birth of John the Baptist: "When Elizabeth heard Mary's greeting, the child in her womb moved, and the Holy Spirit filled Elizabeth."

== Church on folk rituals ==
In medieval Russia, the rituals and games of the day were considered demonic and were banned by church authorities. Thus, the message of the hegumen Pamphil of the Yelizarov Convent (1505) to the Pskov governor and authorities condemned the "pagan" games of Pskov residents on the night of the Nativity of John the Baptist:

For when the feast day of the Nativity of Forerunner itself arrives, then on this holy night nearly the entire city runs riot and in the villages they are possessed by drums and flutes and by the strings of the guitars and by every type of unsuitable satanic music, with the clapping of hands and dances, and with the women and the maidens and with the movements of the heads and with the terrible cry from their mouths: all of those songs are devilish and obscene, and curving their backs and leaping and jumping up and down with their legs; and right there do men and youths suffer great temptation, right there do they leer lasciviously in the face of the insolence of the women and the maidens, and there even occurs depravation for married women and perversion for the maidens.

– Epistle of Pamphilus of Yelizarov Monastery

Stoglav (a collection of decisions of the Stoglav Synod of 1551) also condemns the revelry during the Kupala Night, which originated in "Hellenistic" paganism

And furthermore many of the children of Orthodox Christians, out of simple ignorance, engage in Hellenic devilish practices, a variety of games and clapping of hands in the cities and in the villages against the festivities of the Nativity of the Great John Prodome; and on the night of that same feast day and for the whole day until night-time, men and women and children in the houses and spread throughout the streets make a ruckus in the water with all types of games and much revelry and with satanic singing and dancing and gusli and in many other unseemly manners and ways, and even in a state of drunkenness.

– Stoglav, chapter 92

Contemporary representatives of the Russian Orthodox Church continue to oppose some of the customs associated with this holiday. At the same time, responding to a question about the "intermingling" of Christian and pagan holidays, hieromonk Iov expressed an opinion:

The perennial persistence among the people of some of the customs of the Kupala Night does not indicate a double faith, but rather an incompleteness of faith. After all, how many people who have never participated in these pagan entertainments are prone to superstition and mythological ideas. The ground for this is our fallen nature, corrupted by sin.

In 2013, at the request of the ROC, the celebrations of Kupala Night and Neptune's Day were banned in the Rossoshansky District of the Voronezh Oblast.

== See also ==
- Midsummer

== Bibliography ==
- Afanasyev, Alexander N. (1994). Поэтические воззрения славян на природу. Vol. 3. Moscow: Индрик. p. 840. ISBN 5-85759-013-2. Archived from the original on 2015-04-16.
- Agapkina, Tat'yana A. (2002). Мифопоэтические основы славянского народного календаря. Весенне-летний цикл (PDF). Традиционная духовная культура славян. Современные исследования. Moscow: Индрик. ISBN 5-85759-143-0.
- Alvarez-Pedroza, Juan Antonio (2021). Sources of Slavic Pre-Christian Religion. Leiden: Koninklijke Brill. ISBN 978-90-04-44138-5.
- Baranova, O.G.; Zimina, T.A.; Madlevska, J.L.; Ostrovsky, A.B. (2001). Русский праздник. Праздники и обряды народного земледельческого календаря. Иллюстрированная энциклопедия. История в зеркале быта. Petersburg: Искусство-СПБ. ISBN 5-210-01497-5.
- Berdnyk, Hromovytsya (2006). Знаки карпатської магії. Манускрипт (in Ukrainian). Kyiv: Зелений пёс. ISBN 966-2938-31-1.
- Bessonov, Pyotr A. (1871). Белорусские песни с подробными объяснениями. Мoscow: Типография Бахметева.
- Biegeleisen, Henryk (1928). Wesele. Lwów: Instytut Stauropigjański.
- Dal, Vladimir I. (1879). "Месяцеслов". Пословицы русского народа. Сборник пословиц, поговорок, речений, присловий, чистоговорок, загадок, поверий и проч. Vol. 2 (2 ed.). Moscow. pp. 508–509. ISBN 9785882040474.
- Galkovsky, Nikolai M. (1916). Борьба христианства с остатками язычества в древней Руси. Vol. 1. Charków: Епархиальная типография.
- Galkovsky, Nikolai M. (1913). Борьба христианства с остатками язычества в древней Руси. Vol. 2. Moscow: Печатня А. И. Снегиревой.
- Grushko, Yelena A.; Medvedev, Yuri M. (1996). Словарь русских суеверий, заклинаний, примет и поверий. "Русский купец. ISBN 9785882040474.
- Holobuts’ky, Volodymyr O.; Karadobri, Tetyana A. (2009). "Купала, Купайло". Encyclopedia of History of Ukraine (in Ukrainian). Vol. 5. Valeriy A. Smoliy (red.). Kyiv: Наукова Думка. p. 499.
- Horzelski, J. P. (1975). "Świętojańskie wianki i kwiat paproci". Wiadomości (21/1521). Londyn. Archived from the original on 2016-06-03.
- Ivanov, Vyacheslav V.; Toporov, Vladimir N. (1974). Исследования в области славянских древностей. Moscow: Nauka.
- Kapitsa, Fyodor S. (2007). Тайны славянских Богов. Ваша тайна. Moscow: РИПОЛ классик. p. 416. ISBN 978-5-7905-4437-8.
- Kapitsa, Fyodor S. (2006). "Купала". Тайны славянских Богов. Ваша тайна. Moscow: РИПОЛ классик. pp. 60 – 65, 286–288. ISBN 5-7905-4437-1.
- Kempiński, Andrzej M. (1993). Słownik mitologii ludów indoeuropejskich. Poznań: SAWW.
- Korinfsky, Apollon A. (1901). "Иван Купала" . Народная Русь. Круглый год сказаний, поверий, обычаев и пословиц русского народа. Moscow: Первая женская типография. pp. 37–38.
- Kotovich, Oksana V.; Kruk, Ivan I. (2010). Золотые правила народной культуры (in Belarusian). Minsk: Адукацыя i выхаванне. p. 592. ISBN 978-985-471-335-9.
- Kuskov, Vladimir V. (1994). Литература и культура древней Руси: словарь-справочник. Moscow: Высшая школа.
- Lis, Arsen S. (1989). "Купалле". Этнаграфія Беларусi. Энцыклапедыя (in Belarusian). Ivan P. Shamyakin (red.). Mińsk: БелСЭ. pp. 280–281. ISBN 5-85700-014-9.
- Madlevska, Yelena L. (2005). "Иван Купала". Русская мифология. Энциклопедия. Эксмо, Мидгард. p. 784. ISBN 978-5699135356.
- Madlevska, Yelena L.; Eriashvili, Nodari D.; Pavlovski, Vladimir P. (2007). Русская мифология. Энциклопедия. Тайны древних цивилизаций. Moscow: Эксмо, Мидгард. pp. 340 – 349. ISBN 978-5-699-13535-6.
- Medyntseva, Albina A. (1978). Древнерусские надписи Новгородского Софийского собора. Moscow: Nauka.
- Morozov, Igorʹ A.; Sleptsova, Irina S. (2004). Круг игры. Праздник и игра в жизни севернорусского крестьянина (XIX-XX вв.) (PDF). Moscow: Индрик. p. 920. ISBN 5-85759-295-X.
- Nekrylova, Anna F. (1991). Круглый год. Moscow: Правда. ISBN 5-253-00598-6.
- Nekrylova, Anna F. (2007). Русский традиционный календарь: на каждый день и для каждого дома. Petersburg: Азбука-классика. ISBN 978-5352021408.
- Nikodim (1915). Святитель и чудотворец Иоасаф, епископ Белгородский (PDF). Kursk: Епархиальная типография. p. 51.
- Petrović, Petar Ž. (1970). "Ивањдан". Српски митолошки речник (in Serbian). Belgrad: Нолит. pp. 158–160.
- Petrukhin, Vladimir Ya. (2011). Русь и вси языци: Аспекты исторических взаимосвязей: Историко-археологические очерки. Studia historica. Moscow: Языки славянских культур. p. 600. ISBN 978-5-9551-0288-7.
- Propp, Vladimir Y. (1995). Русские аграрные праздники (PDF). Petersburg: Терра – Азбука. ISBN 5-300-00114-7. Archived from the original (PDF) on 2013-03-17.
- Sakharov, Ivan P. (1885). Сказания русского народа. Народный дневник. Petersburg: Издание А. С. Суворина.
- Shangina, Izabella I.; Nekrylova, Anna F. (2015). Русские праздники. Русская энциклопедия. Petersburg: Азбука, Азбука-Аттикус. ISBN 978-5-389-11816-4.
- Shangina, Izabella I. (2004). Русские праздники: от святок до святок. Moscow: Азбука-классика. ISBN 535200984X. Archived from the original on 2011-09-18.
- Sharafadina, Klara I. (2010). "Флористическая «Загадка» А. Н. Островского, или этноботаническая интерпретация «Венка Весны для Снегурочки»". Acta linguistica petropolitana. Труды института лингвистических исследований. Vol. VI. Nikolai N. Kazansky (red.) (№ 1 ed.). Petersburg: Nauka. pp. 164–188. ISBN 978-5-02-025607-1.
- Sokolov, M.I. (1890). "Отчего канун Иванова дня (23 июня) называют купальницею и считается днем урочным?". Живая старина (2 ed.): 137–138.
- Sokolova, Vera K. (1979). Весенне-летние календарные обряды русских, украинцев и белорусов XIX – начало XX в. Академия наук СССР, Институт этнографии им. Н. Н. Миклухо-Маклая. Moscow: Nauka.
- Strakhov, Alexandr B. (2003). Ночь перед Рождеством: народное христианство и рождественская обрядность на Западе и у славян. Cambridge (Massachusetts): Cambridge-Mass.
- Strzelczyk, Jerzy (1998). Mity, podania i wierzenia dawnych Słowian. Poznań: Dom Wydawniczy Rebis. ISBN 83-7120-688-7.
- Tereshchenko, Aleksandr V. (1848). "5. Простонародные обряды". Быт русского народа: забавы, игры, хороводы. Petersburg: Типография военно-учебных заведений.
- Titovets, Aleksandr W.; Fursova, Yelena F.; Tyapkova, Tat'yana K. (2014). Традиционная культура белорусов во времени и пространстве. Litres. ISBN 978-5457650237.
- Tolstaya, Svetlana M. (2005). Полесский народный календарь. Традиционная духовная культура славян. Современные исследования. Moscow: Индрик. p. 600. ISBN 5-85759-300-X.
- Tolstoy, Nikita I. (1986). Славянский и балканский фольклор: Духовная культура Полесья на общеславянском фоне. Институт славяноведения и балканистики АН СССР. Moscow: Nauka.
- Tolstoy, Nikita I. (1995). "Светила и стихии". Язык и народная культура. Очерки по славянской мифологии и этнолингвистике. Традиционная духовная культура славян. Современные исследования. Moscow: Индрик. pp. 311–312. ISBN 5-85759-025-6.
- Ulewicz, Tadeusz (1948). Swiadomość słowiańska Jana Kochanowskiego. Kraków: Seminarium Historii Literatury Polskiej U. J.
- Vasilyevich, Uladzimir A. (1992). "Беларускі народны каляндар". Паэзія беларускага земляробчага календара (in Belarusian). Anatol S. Fiadosik (red.). Minsk: Навука і тэхніка. pp. 554–612.
- Veselovsky, Alexander N. (2009). Избранное: Традиционная духовная культура. Российские Пропилеи. Moscow: Российская политическая энциклопедия (РОССПЭН). ISBN 978-5-8243-1279-9.
- Vinogradova, Ludmila N. (1981). "Девичьи гадания о замужестве в цикле славянской календарной обрядности (западно-восточнославянские параллели)". In Tolstoy, Nikita I. (ed.). Славянский и балканский фольклор: Обряд. Текст (PDF). Moscow: Nauka.
- Vinogradova, Ludmila N.; Tolstaya, Svetlana M. (1990). "Мотив "уничтожения – проводов нечистой силы" в восточнославянском купальском обряде". Исследования в области балто-славянской духовной культуры. Погребальный обряд. Moscow: Nauka.
- Vinogradova, Ludmila N.; Levkiyevska, Yelena Ye., eds. (2010). Народная демонология Полесья: Публикации текстов в записях 80–90-х гг. XX века. Studia philologica. Vol. 1. Moscow: Языки славянских культур. p. 648. ISBN 978-5-9551-0446-1.
- Zabylin, Mikhail M. (1880). Русский народ, его обычаи, обряды, предания, суеверия и поэзия. Moscow: Издание книгопродавца М. Березина.
- "Купало" . Brockhaus and Efron Encyclopedic Dictionary (in Russian). Vol. 17. Petersburg: Брокгауз – Ефрон. 1896. pp. 37–38.
- "Соботки" . Brockhaus and Efron Encyclopedic Dictionary (in Russian). Vol. 30. Petersburg: Брокгауз – Ефрон. 1900. pp. 649–650.
- Русская традиционная культура. Фольклор Калужской губернии: альманах, Выпуски 3–4 (3–4 ed.). Moscow: Родник. 1998.
- Труды Этнографическо-статистической экспедиции в юго-западный край. Материалы и исследования, собранные П. П. Чубинским. Vol. 3. Petersburg. 1872.

Slavic antiques

- Agapkina, Tat'yana A. (1995). "Весна". In Tolstoy, Nikita I. (ed.). Славянские древности: Этнолингвистический словарь. Vol. 1. Moscow: Международные отношения. pp. 348–352. ISBN 5-7133-0704-2.
- Agapkina, Tat'yana A. (1999). "Дмитрия св. день". In Tolstoy, Nikita I. (ed.). Славянские древности: Этнолингвистический словарь. Vol. 2. Moscow: Международные отношения. pp. 93–94. ISBN 5-7133-0982-7.
- Agapkina, Tat'yana A. (1999). "Качели". In Tolstoy, Nikita I. (ed.). Славянские древности: Этнолингвистический словарь. Vol. 2. Moscow: Международные отношения. pp. 480–483. ISBN 5-7133-0982-7.
- Agapkina, Tat'yana A. (2004). "Инцест". In Tolstoy, Nikita I. (ed.). Славянские древности: Этнолингвистический словарь. Vol. 3. Moscow: Международные отношения. pp. 418–420. ISBN 5-7133-1207-0.
- Agapkina, Tat'yana A.; Levkiyevska, Yelena Ye. (1995). "Втыкать". In Tolstoy, Nikita I. (ed.). Славянские древности: Этнолингвистический словарь. Vol. 1. Moscow: Международные отношения. pp. 458–459. ISBN 5-7133-0704-2.
- Agapkina, Tat'yana A.; Vinogradova, Ludmila N. (1999). "Колесо". In Tolstoy, Nikita I. (ed.). Славянские древности: Этнолингвистический словарь. Vol. 2. Moscow: Международные отношения. pp. 534–536. ISBN 5-7133-0982-7.
- Buszkiewicz, Swietłana P. (1999). "Жертва". In Tolstoy, Nikita I. (ed.). Славянские древности: Этнолингвистический словарь. Vol. 2. Moscow: Международные отношения. pp. 208–215. ISBN 5-7133-0982-7.
- Gura, Aleksandr W. (1999). "Жук". In Tolstoy, Nikita I. (ed.). Славянские древности: Этнолингвистический словарь. Vol. 2. Moscow: Международные отношения. pp. 225–227. ISBN 5-7133-0982-7.
- Kabakova, Galina I. (1995). "Возраст". In Tolstoy, Nikita I. (ed.). Славянские древности: Этнолингвистический словарь. Vol. 1. Moscow: Международные отношения. pp. 405–407. ISBN 5-7133-0704-2.
- Kabakova, Galina I. (1999). "Девственность". In Tolstoy, Nikita I. (ed.). Славянские древности: Этнолингвистический словарь. Vol. 2. Moscow: Международные отношения. pp. 35–36. ISBN 5-7133-0982-7.
- Levkiyevska, Yelena Ye. (1999). "Домовой". In Tolstoy, Nikita I. (ed.). Славянские древности: Этнолингвистический словарь. Vol. 2. Moscow: Международные отношения. pp. 120–124. ISBN 5-7133-0982-7.
- Levkiyevska, Yelena Ye. (1999). "Дорога". In Tolstoy, Nikita I. (ed.). Славянские древности: Этнолингвистический словарь. Vol. 2. Moscow: Международные отношения. pp. 124–129. ISBN 5-7133-0982-7.
- Morozov, Igorʹ A. (2004). "Игры народные". In Tolstoy, Nikita I. (ed.). Славянские древности: Этнолингвистический словарь. Vol. 3. Moscow: Международные отношения. pp. 380–386. ISBN 5-7133-1207-0.
- Tolstaya, Svetlana M. (1999). "Игра солнца". In Tolstoy, Nikita I. (ed.). Славянские древности: Этнолингвистический словарь. Vol. 2. Moscow: Международные отношения. pp. 376–377. ISBN 5-7133-0982-7.
- Usachova, Valeriya V. (1999). "Конопля". In Tolstoy, Nikita I. (ed.). Славянские древности: Этнолингвистический словарь. Vol. 2. Moscow: Международные отношения. pp. 583–588. ISBN 5-7133-0982-7.
- Usachova, Valeriya V. (1999). "Корень". In Tolstoy, Nikita I. (ed.). Славянские древности: Этнолингвистический словарь. Vol. 2. Moscow: Международные отношения. pp. 595–598. ISBN 5-7133-0982-7.
- Vinogradova, Ludmila N.; Tolstaya, Svetlana M. (1995). "Головня". In Tolstoy, Nikita I. (ed.). Славянские древности: Этнолингвистический словарь. Vol. 1. Moscow: Международные отношения. pp. 508–510. ISBN 5-7133-0704-2.
- Vinogradova, Ludmila N.; Tolstaya, Svetlana M. (1995). "Венок". In Tolstoy, Nikita I. (ed.). Славянские древности: Этнолингвистический словарь. Vol. 1. Moscow: Международные отношения. pp. 314–318. ISBN 5-7133-0704-2.
- Vinogradova, Ludmila N.; Usachova, Valeriya V. (1999). "Зелень". In Tolstoy, Nikita I. (ed.). Славянские древности: Этнолингвистический словарь. Vol. 2. Moscow: Международные отношения. pp. 308–312. ISBN 5-7133-0982-7.
- Vinogradova, Ludmila N. (1999). "Вода". In Tolstoy, Nikita I. (ed.). Славянские древности: Этнолингвистический словарь. Vol. 2. Moscow: Международные отношения. pp. 386–390. ISBN 5-7133-0982-7.
- Vinogradova, Ludmila N. (1999). "Деревце купальское". In Tolstoy, Nikita I. (ed.). Славянские древности: Этнолингвистический словарь. Vol. 2. Moscow: Международные отношения. pp. 82–83. ISBN 5-7133-0982-7.
- Vinogradova, Ludmila N.; Tolstaya, Svetlana M. (1999). "Иван Купала". In Tolstoy, Nikita I. (ed.). Славянские древности: Этнолингвистический словарь. Vol. 2. Moscow: Международные отношения. pp. 363–368. ISBN 5-7133-0982-7.
- Vinogradova, Ludmila N. (2004). "Купальские песни". In Tolstoy, Nikita I. (ed.). Славянские древности: Этнолингвистический словарь. Vol. 3. Moscow: Международные отношения. pp. 47–49. ISBN 5-7133-1207-0.

Dictionaries

- Boryś, Wiesław (2005). "kąpać". Słownik etymologiczny languagea polskiego. Kraków: Wydawnictwo Literackie. p. 226. ISBN 978-83-08-04191-8.
- Dal, Vladimir I. (1881). "Купать: Купала". Толковый словарь живого великорусского языка. Vol. 2 (2 ed.). Petersburg: Типография М. О. Вольфа. p. 223. ISBN 9785882040474.
- Mel’nychuk, Oleksandr S., ed. (1989). "Купа́ло". Етимологічний словник української мови (in Ukrainian). Vol. 3. Kyiv: Наукова Думка. p. 145. ISBN 5-12-001263-9.
- Sławski, Franciszek (1969). "kupała". Słownik etymologiczny języka polskiego. Vol. 3. Kraków: Towarzystwo Miłośników Języka Polskiego.
- Sreznevsky, Izmail I. (1893). "кꙋпалиꙗ". Матеріалы для Словаря древне-русскаго языка по письменнымъ памятникамъ. Vol. 1. Petersburg: Wydział Języka i Literatury Rosyjskiej Cesarskiej Akademii Nauk. p. 1368.
- Sreznevsky, Izmail I. (1893). "кꙋпало". Матеріалы для Словаря древне-русскаго языка по письменнымъ памятникамъ. Vol. 1. Petersburg: Wydział Języka i Literatury Rosyjskiej Cesarskiej Akademii Nauk. p. 1369.
- Sreznevsky, Izmail I. (1893). "кꙋпалꙑ". Матеріалы для Словаря древне-русскаго языка по письменнымъ памятникамъ. Vol. 1. Petersburg: Wydział Języka i Literatury Rosyjskiej Cesarskiej Akademii Nauk. p. 1369.
- Trubachyov, Oleg, ed. (1985). "*kǫpadlo". Этимологический словарь славянских языков. Vol. 12. Moscow: Nauka. p. 58.
- Trubachyov, Oleg, ed. (1985). "*kǫpati (sę)". Этимологический словарь славянских языков. Vol. 12. Moscow: Nauka. pp. 58–61.
- Vasmer, Max (1986). "Купа́ла". Этимологический словарь русского языка (in Russian). Vol. 2. Oleg Trubachyov (tłum.) (2 ed.). Moscow: Progress. p. 419.
