= Sofia Rotaru discography =

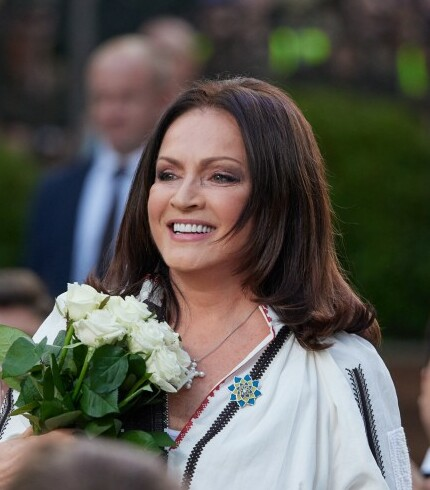
- Rotaru in 2021
- Studio albums: 18
- Compilation albums: 26

The discography of Sofia Rotaru includes studio albums and compilation albums, as well as charted and other notable songs.

== Studio albums ==
Title	Album details	Peak chart positions
Title	Album details	USSR
Chervona ruta	Released: 1972; Label: Melodiya; Formats: LP, digital download	—
Sofiya Rotaru (aka Ballada o skripkakh)	Released: 1974; Label: Melodiya; Formats: LP	—
Sofiya Rotaru II	Released: 1976; Label: Melodiya; Formats: LP	3
Pisni Volodimira Ivasyuka spivae Sofia Rotaru	Released: 1978; Label: Melodiya; Formats: LP	—
Sofiya Rotaru III	Released: 1978; Label: Melodiya; Formats: LP	—
Tolko tebe	Released: 1979; Label: Melodiya; Formats: LP	10
Gde ty, lyubov?	Released: 1981; Label: Melodiya; Formats: LP	—
Nezhnaya melodiya	Released: 1985; Label: Melodiya; Formats: LP	—
Monolog o lyubvi	Released: 1987; Label: Melodiya; Formats: LP	—
Zolotoye serdtse	Released: 1988; Label: Melodiya; Formats: LP	—
Karavan lyubvi	Released: 1991; Label: Sintez Records, RiTonis; Formats: LP	—
Khutoryanka	Released: 1995; Label: DS, Soyuz, Bekar; Formats: CD, MC	*
Lyubi menya	Released: 1998; Label: Extraphone; Formats: CD, MC	*
Ya tebya po-prezhnemu lyublyu	Released: 2002; Label: Extraphone; Formats: CD, MC	*
Nebo – eto ya	Released: 2004; Label: Artur Music; Formats: CD, MC	*
Ya zhe yego lyubila	Released: 2005; Label: Artur Music; Formats: CD, MC	*
Ya – tvoya lybov!	Released: 2008; Label: Artur Music, Kvadro-Disk; Formats: CD, MC, digital download	*
Ya ne oglyanus	Released: 2010; Label: Artur Music; Formats: CD, MC, digital download	*
"—" denotes items which were not released in that country or failed to chart. "*" denotes the chart did not exist at that time.

== Compilation albums ==
Title	Album details
Modern Ukraine with Sophia Rotaru	Released: 1975 (US); Label: Apon; Formats: LP
Visit to Ukraine	Released: 1980 (US); Label: Apon; Formats: LP
Sofia Rotaru / Lev Leshchenko (with Lev Leshchenko)	Released: 1979; Label: Melodiya; Formats: LP
Canadian Tour	Released: 1983 (US); Label: Hartley Records; Formats: LP
Sofiya Rotaru	Released: 1984; Label: Melodiya; Formats: MC
Lavanda	Released: 1987 (Finland); Label: Finnlevy; Formats: LP, MC, digital download
Sofiya Rotaru (aka Romantika)	Released: 1993 (Germany); Label: Konzert Agentur Michael Friedmann; Formats: CD
Sofiya Rotaru (aka Karavan lyubvi)	Released: 1993 (Germany); Label: Konzert Agentur Michael Friedmann; Formats: CD
Lavanda	Released: 1995 (Germany); Label: Konzert Agentur Michael Friedmann; Formats: CD
Zolotyye pesni 1985/95	Released: 1995; Label: DS, Soyuz, Bekar; Formats: CD, MC
Noch lyubvi	Released: 1996 (Germany); Label: Konzert Agentur Michael Friedmann; Formats: CD, MC
Chervona ruta	Released: 1996; Label: Melodiya; Formats: CD
Snezhnaya koroleva	Released: 2002; Label: Extraphone; Formats: CD, MC
Yedynomu...	Released: 2003; Label: Artur Music; Formats: CD, MC
Listopad	Released: 2002; Label: Extraphone; Formats: CD, MC
Lyubovnoye nastroyeniye	Released: 2003; Label: Nikitin; Formats: CD, MC
Grand Collection	Released: 2004; Label: Kvadro-Disk; Formats: CD, MC
Teche voda	Released: 2004; Label: Franchising Records; Formats: CD, MC
Zolotaya seriya	Released: 2004; Label: Monolit; Formats: CD, MC
Lavanda, Khutoryanka, daleye vezde...	Released: 2004; Label: JAM Group International; Formats: CD, MC
Kogda rastsvetayet lyubov	Released: 2005; Label: Extraphone; Formats: CD, MC
Dve zvezdy (with Alla Pugacheva)	Released: 2006; Label: Extraphone; Formats: CD
Tuman. Novyye i luchshiye pesni 2002–2007	Released: 2007; Label: Artur Music; Formats: CD, MC
Zolotaya kollektsiya MP3	Released: 2007; Label: Artur Music; Formats: CD
Lavanda. Legendy zhanra	Released: 2007; Label: Classic Company; Formats: CD
Zolotyye pesni 2008–2013	Released: 2013; Label: Artur Music; Formats: CD, digital download

== Charted songs ==
Year	Title	Peak chart positions					Album
Year	Title	CIS	KAZ	MDA	RUS	UKR	Album
2003	"Bely tanets"	57	—	—	69	81	Nebo – eto ya
2003	"Belaya zima"	3	56	—	4	43	Nebo – eto ya
2004	"Bely tanets" (Remix)	9	—	—	4	16	Nebo – eto ya
2004	"Tsvetyot malina" (with Nikolay Baskov)	52	—	—	110	43	Ya zhe yego lyubila
2004	"Nebo – eto ya"	2	—	—	38	1	Nebo – eto ya
2004	"Pozovi"	12	—	—	9	22	Nebo – eto ya
2004	"Ty uletish"	12	—	—	17	22	Ya zhe yego lyubila
2004	"Novy god"	34	—	—	41	29	Non-album song
2005	"Ne kupish lyubov" (with Valery Meladze, Andrey Danilko and VIA Gra)	24	—	—	125	33	Ya zhe yego lyubila
2005	"Ya zhe yego lyubila"	4	—	154	3	20	Ya zhe yego lyubila
2005	"Vishnyovy sad"	124	—	—	—	35	Ya zhe yego lyubila
2005	"Osenniye tsvety"	5	—	—	6	2	Ya zhe yego lyubila
2006	"Vyuga"	52	—	—	51	33	Non-album song
2006	"Odin na svete"	6	—	156	6	2	Ya – tvoya lyubov
2006	"Bylo, no proshlo" (Re-release)	109	—	—	96	167	Zolotoye serdtse
2006	"Lavanda" (Re-release)	108	—	—	107	—	Lavanda
2006	"Ne lyubi"	4	—	—	6	1	Ya – tvoya lyubov
2006	"Kakaya na sertse pogoda"	45	—	—	75	2	Ya – tvoya lyubov
2007	"Serdtse ty moyo"	2	—	—	5	1	Ya – tvoya lyubov
2007	"Ya – tvoya lyubov"	3	—	200	5	1	Ya – tvoya lyubov
2008	"Ya nazovu planetu"	2	151	121	1	1	Ya – tvoya lyubov
2008	"Ne ukhodi"	1	—	—	2	5	Ya – tvoya lyubov
2008	"Tuman"	—	—	—	—	181	Ya ne oglyanus
2008	"Oglyanis nazad"	—	—	—	—	77	Ya – tvoya lyubov
2009	"Ya reshila sama"	12	—	—	14	3	Non-album songs
2009	"Nas ne dogonyat" (with Alla Pugacheva)	—	—	—	—	93	Non-album songs
2009	"Vremya podozhdyot"	—	—	—	—	39	Ya ne oglyanus
2010	"Kapelka lyubvi"	63	—	—	59	—	Non-album song
2010	"Ya ne oglyanus"	23	—	152	26	7	Ya ne oglyanus
2011	"Vremya lyubit"	106	—	—	187	10	Non-album songs
2011	"Vremya lyubit" (Remix) (featuring Pyotr Dranga)	17	—	—	16	—	Non-album songs
2011	"Luna luna" (Re-release)	—	—	—	—	169	Non-album songs
2011	"Tolko etogo malo" (Re-release)	—	—	—	—	146	Zolotoye serdtse
2012	"My budem vmeste"	43	—	—	43	66	Non-album songs
2012	"Dva solntsa"	119	—	—	—	93	Non-album songs
2012	"Ya naydu svoyu lyubov" (with Nikolay Baskov)	113	—	—	125	—	Non-album songs
2013	"Tri dnya"	64	—	—	61	—	Non-album songs
2013	"Prosti"	85	—	—	169	17	Non-album songs
2013	"Ty samy luchshy"	64	—	—	155	2	Non-album songs
2014	"Moya lyubov"	120	—	—	—	6	Non-album songs
2014	"Davay ustroim leto"	76	—	—	71	74	Non-album songs
2016	"Skolko by zima ni mela"	47	—	—	47	—	Non-album songs
2017	"Na semi vetrakh"	169	—	—	160	—	Non-album songs
2019	"Muzyka moyey lyubvi"	180	—	—	142	—	Non-album songs
"—" denotes items which were not released in that country or failed to chart.

== Selected songs ==
- 1972 Chervona Ruta
- 1978 Deine Zärtlichkeit
- 1981 Kray, miy ridniy kray
- 1983 Melancolie
- 1985 Lavanda

== Other ==
In 1966, a musical documentary film 'A Nightingale from the Village of Marshyntsiwas released, with a brief introduction about her, in which she performed four songs.
