= Solovei iz sela Marshyntsi =

Solovey iz sela Marshintsy
- Directed by: Rostyslav Synko
- Produced by: Sofia Rotaru
- Starring: Sofia Rotaru
- Distributed by: Ukrtelefilm
- Release date: January 1, 1966 (Soviet Union)
- Running time: 12 minutes
- Country: Soviet Union
- Languages: Moldavian (Romanian) (songs); Russian (commentary and song summaries)

Solovey iz sela Marshyntsi (Russian: Соловей из села Маршинцы, lit. 'Nightingale from the village of Marshyntsi') is a 1966 short Soviet musical documentary film. It was the first studio filmed movie starring Sofia Rotaru.

== Content ==
Rotaru was 19, a student of the Chernivtsi musical college, Chernivtsi , when she starred in the film as a performer of Moldavian folk songs. The setting is the premises of the Chernivtsi Philharmonic Hall. The name of the film was ultimately adopted as Rotaru's nickname in Soviet Union media reports of her career in the 1970s.

The singer appears in the titles with her Moldavian Cyrillic last name - (Ротарь, Rotar') used in the Soviet Union.

=== Songs ===
- Moldovan folk song Mult mi-e dragă primăvara, "I Love Spring Very Much"
- Moldovan folk song "Măi Ioane", "Hey, Ioan", in Russian sources about Rotaru named "Иван и Мария" ("Ivan and Maria")
- "Mommy", (in Russian, Aleksandr Bronevitsky, words: Oleg Milyavsky, written for Edita Piekha, 1965)
- Dragostea a venit, "The Love Has Come", in Moldavian
