= Monologue of Love =

Studio album by Sofia Rotaru
- Released: 1987(USSR)
- Recorded: 1987, Melodiya, Moscow
- Genre: Pop, Rock
- Label: Melodiya
- Producer: Sofia Rotaru

Sofia Rotaru chronology
Tender Melody (1985)	Monologue of Love (1987)	Lavanda (1987)

Monologue of Love is the studio album by Soviet singer Sofia Rotaru, released in 1987 by Melodiya. The long play album was simultaneously released for the Soviet and international market. The album includes songs performed in Russian with new rock style arrangements by leading Soviet pop and rock bands: Vesyolye Rebyata, Forum, Chervona Ruta. This album is a soundtrack album to the movie Monologue of Love released in 1986.

== Track listing ==
=== Side A ===
#	Title	Music	Lyrics	Production credits	Time
01	"Song of Our Summer"; Russian: Песня нашего лета/Pesnya nashego leta	Vladimir Matetsky	M. Tanich	1988	5:10
02	"Night"; Russian: Ночь/Nochi	V. Lashchuk	V. Lashchuk	1988	3:20
03	"Autumn"; Russian: Осень/Oseni	Ihor Poklad	G. Taranenko	1988	2:55
04	"Ocean"; Russian: Океан/Okean	V. Lashchuk	A. Matviichuk, V. Lashchuk	1988	5:20
05	"'Retro' Car"; Russian: Машина «Ретро»/Mashina "Retro"	G. Tatrchenko	Yu. Rybchinsky	1988	2:45

=== Side B ===
#	Title	Music	Lyrics	Production credits	Time
01	"Last Bridge"; Russian: Последний Мост	Aleksandr Morozov	Larisa Rubalskaya	1988	4:51
02	"Leaves've Fallen"; Russian: Улетели Листья	Aleksandr Morozov	Nikolai Rubtsov	1988	4:12
03	"Incident"; Russian: Маленькое Происшествие	Aleksandr Morozov	Mijail Riabinin	1988	2:55
04	"Theatre"; Russian: Театр	Tatiana Dikareva	Ihor Lazarevsky	1988	5:20

== Album design ==
- Art direction, cover design: M. Afanasiev
- Photography: S. Borisov
