= My Boo (album) =

My Boo (Together!)

Studio album by Ruslana
- Released: 25 April 2012 (Ukraine); 13 July 2013 (Ukraine); 1 January 2014 (iTunes)
- Recorded: 2010–2011 in San Francisco, Kyiv and Stockholm
- Genre: Eurodance; dance-pop; europop; worldbeat
- Length: 31:49
- Label: EMI
- Producer: Vlad DeBriansky, Ruslana

Ruslana chronology
Wild Energy (2008)	My Boo (Together!) (2012)

Alternative cover
- Ukrainian edition (2012)

Singles from My Boo! (Together)
- 1. "This is Euphoria" Released: 7 August 2013

My Boo (Together!) is the title of the third English-language studio album of the Ukrainian singer Ruslana. The Ukrainian version was released on 25 April 2012 under the title Ey-fory-ya (Ukrainian: ЕЙ-форі-Я) (Eu-phori-a). and then it has been re-released in Ukraine in July 2013 under the title Miy brat (Razom!).

== Background ==
Two new Ruslana songs, "Wow" and "Sha-la-la" made their original appearance in the beginning of 2011; the former was the first single for the new album while the latter was an adjacent typical Ruslana production with gipsy influences. The music video of the first track publicly premiered on the Snidanok z 1+1 TV show on 14 April, and received positive feedback from the critics.

On 25 October 2011 it was revealed the title of the third single, "Davaj, hraj", this song being an anthem for the UEFA EURO 2012.

During an online conference with fans hosted by a Ukrainian website, Ruslana revealed her sources of inspiration for the songwriting of the album. Among others, the names of the famous composers Moussorgsky, Rachmaninoff and Tchaikovsky were mentioned. It was also revealed that most of the songs were written by Ruslana, produced and co-written by Vlad DeBriansky in the United States, while the song "Давай, грай! / ОГО!ОГО!" was written and produced in Ukraine by Ruslana. Songs "Euphoria" and ""Роби гучніше!" were written and produced in Sweden by Stefan Örn.

The album's credits includes the names of American top musicians such as Rusty Allen, Victor Little, Oscar Seaton, Brian Coller as well as Stefan Örn from Sweden who won the Eurovision Song Contest 2011 as a songwriter. Goran Bregovich, the legendary Balkan musician from Serbia produced the song "Kray".

== Recorded tracks ==
=== Ukrainian version ===
The official track listing was revealed on 25 April 2012 during a press conference in Kyiv. The Ukrainian version of the album contains nine songs.

#	Title	Writer(s)	Time
1.	"Miy brat" («Мій брат!»)	Ruslana, Vlad DeBriansky	3:39
2.	"ShaLaLa" («ШаЛаЛа»)	Ruslana, Vlad DeBriansky, Oleksandr Ksenofontov	3:15
3.	"Rachmaninov" («Рахманінов»)	Ruslana, Vlad DeBriansky	3:22
4.	"Roby huchnishe!" («Роби гучніше!»)	Ruslana, Stefan Örn	3:03
5.	"Vau!" («Вау!»)	Ruslana, Vlad DeBriansky, Oleksandr Ksenofontov	3:01
6.	"Ja-blu4ko!" («Я-блу4ко!»)	Ruslana	3:20
7.	"Davay, hray!" («Давай, грай! / Ого! Ого!»)	Ruslana	3:47
8.	"EY-fori-Ya!" («ЕЙ-форі-Я!»)	Stefan Örn, Ruslana	3:52
9.	"Kray" («Край»)	Goran Bregovich, Mykola Mozhovyy	4:20

=== English version ===
The English version of the album contains eighth songs, a bonus track in Ukrainian language and two remixes.

#	Title	Writer(s)	Time
1.	"My Boo!"	Ruslana & Vlad DeBriansky	3:39
2.	"ShaLaLa"	Ruslana & Vlad DeBriansky	3:18
3.	"Rachmaninov"	Ruslana & Vlad DeBriansky	3:24
4.	"Wow!"	Ruslana, Vlad DeBriansky	2:56
5.	"Pop Up!"	Stefan Örn, Ruslana & Vlad DeBriansky	3:07
6.	"Yablo4ko"	Ruslana & Vlad DeBriansky	3:32
7.	"Ogo! Ogo!"	Ruslana & Vlad DeBriansky	3:05
8.	"This is Euphoria"	Stefan Örn & Ruslana	3:59
9.	"Kray"	Goran Bregovich, Mykola Mozhovyy	4:23
10.	"Dream Euphoria" (DJ Small's Remix)	Ruslana & Stefan Örn	4:23
11.	"Rachmaninov" (DJ Small's Remake)	Ruslana & Vlad DeBriansky	3:23

== Singles ==
Already in May 2011 the first single from the album was published. WOW – I'm so Amazing! was produced by Vlad Debriansky in Los Angeles, CA. The song was written by Ruslana in cooperation with Vlad Debriansky and Oleksandr Ksenofontov (Ruslana's husband). The song and the corresponding video clip are meant to be a parody on people who regard themselves as so amazing. Ruslana appears in the funny, ironic video as two different characters and competes with herself about who is the coolest.

In September 2011 the second single Sha-la-la was released. The song was written by Ruslana, Vlad Debriansky and Oleksandr Ksenofontov (Ukrainian lyrics) and was recorded in San Francisco and Kyiv. It is based on a simple gypsy tune. Along with stirring guitars, Ruslana used rendered sounds of step dancers. In the video clip Ruslana created yet again a completely new image. She appears as a gypsy girl with colorful tattooed roses. After a "dance dispute" in a pub, Ruslana and a group of dancers continue their dialogue in the language of dance in the streets of the ancient city of L'viv. Suddenly the entire city is dancing along with them.

The song Давай Грай (Davaj Graj, Come on, play) is dedicated to the European Football Championship UEFA EURO 2012. The premiere took place at the opening celebration of the new stadium of L'viv on 29 October 2012. The idea of this sing- and dance-along song is to unite as many people as possible in single rhythm, sound and dance. Before the show Ruslana made a special rehearsal for the stadium audience teaching the movements to be performed during her song. The experiment worked well and united the 34,000 spectators plus 1,000 dancers in a mass synchronized dance.

In August 2012 another single from the album was released: Мій Брат! (Miy Brat!, My brother!). The video clip produced and directed by Ruslana herself visualizes the battle between boys and girls who in the end fraternize. The dances were performed not only by the professional Maydance dancers who usually accompany her on stage, but also by dozens of fans. Ruslana appeared in this video with shaved temples.

In the video clip for the fifth single from the album, Це – Ей-форі-Я (Tse – Ey-fori-Ya, This is Euphoria) Ruslana criticizes the current juridical system of Ukraine. At the press conference in December 2012 launching her campaign Не мовчи (Don't keep silent) the singer was led in handcuffs by two hooded military guards. The video produced by video producer Semen Gorov was shot at Kyiv fortress, a former prison. The plot starts with a young man playing the bandura, a classical Ukrainian instrument, behind bars. The heroine Ruslana in ragged clothes is violently beaten by prison guards, but manages to free herself and the other inmates, just to find the outside world in ruins. The video symbolizes Ukraine as a prison in the hands of a corrupt and arbitrary juridical system.

On New Year's Eve 2012 Ruslana released another video clip for a song from the album. Rachmaninov, directed by video producer Semen Gorov, was shot at the Kyiv Opera. Ruslana appears as l'enfant terrible at a classical ballet lesson.

== Release history ==
Region	Date	Label	Format	Catalog #
Ukraine	25 April 2012	EMI	Compact disc, digital download	8797124
Ukraine	13 July 2013	EMI	Compact disc	–
Worldwide	1 January 2014	EMI	digital download	–
