= Bordeianu =

Bordeianu is a Romanian surname. Notable people with the surname include:

- Dan Bordeianu (born 1975), Romanian actor and singer
- Mihai Bordeianu (born 1991), Romanian footballer
- Stelian Bordeianu (born 1968), Romanian footballer
- Teodor Bordeianu (1902–1969), Romanian agronomist
