= Sofia Rotaru (album) =

Studio album by Sofia Rotaru
- Released: 1974 (USSR)
- Recorded: 1972–1974
- Studio: Melodiya (Moscow)
- Genre: Pop, dance, pop folk
- Label: Melodiya (USSR)

Sofia Rotaru chronology
Chervona Ruta (1972)	Sofia Rotaru (1974)	Sofia Rotaru (1976)

Sofia Rotaru (София Ротару), also known as Ballad of Violins (Баллада о скрипках) is the second album by Soviet singer-songwriter Sofia Rotaru, released in 1974 by Melodiya. The album includes songs performed in Russian, Ukrainian, Bulgarian and Romanian languages.

== Track listing ==
=== Side A ===
The songs recorded on the side A are all performed in foreign languages, with the musical background played by band Chervona Ruta, directed by Anatoliy Evdokimenko. Songs 1, 3, 4 are performed in Ukrainian language, 2 - in Bulgarian, and 5 - in Romanian languages.

No.	Title	Lyrics	Music	Length
1.	"Баллада о скрипках" (Ballada o skripkakh; Ballad of Violins)	Vasil Marsyuk	Volodymyr Ivasyuk
2.	"Сказка" (Skazka; Fairy tale)	Daniil Demyanov	Toncho Rusev
3.	"Два перстня" (Dva perstnya; Two rings)	V. Ivasyuk	V. Ivasyuk
4.	"Песня будет с нами" (Pesnya budet s nami; Song will be with us)	V. Ivasyuk	V. Ivasyuk
5.	"Только ты" (Tol'ko ty; Only you)	Ștefan Petrache	Petre Teodorovici

=== Side B ===
The songs recorded on side B are all in Russian language. Ensemble Melodiya, under direction of Gueorguiy Garanyan provided the musical background.

No.	Title	Lyrics	Music	Length
1.	"Вспоминай меня" (Vspominay menya; Remember me)	Veronika Tushnova	Vyacheslav Dobrynin
2.	"Твоя вина" (Tvoya vina; Your fault)	Andrey Dementyev, David Usmanov	Yevgeniy Martynov
3.	"Я жду весну" (Ya zhdu vesnu; I'm waiting for spring)	A. Dementyev	Y. Martynov
4.	"Расскажи мне сказку" (Rasskazhi mne skazku; Tell me a fairy tale)	Anatoly Poperechny	Leonid Garin
5.	"Алешенька (Баллада о матери)" (Aleshen'ka (Ballada o materi); Alyoshenka (Ballad about mother))	A. Dementyev	Y. Martynov

== See also ==
Sofia Rotaru at Discogs (list of releases)
