= Canadian Tour 1983 =

Canadian Tour

Studio album by Sofia Rotaru
- Released: 1983
- Genre: Pop, dance
- Language: Ukrainian
- Label: Cansov Exchange Inc., Canada
- Producer: Sofia Rotaru

Sofia Rotaru chronology
Sofia Rotaru and Chervona Ruta (1981)	Canadian Tour (1983)	Tender Melody (1985)

Canadian Tour (Ukrainian: Канадський тур) is the third studio album of Sofia Rotaru, (Note: Rotaru was born in Bukovina, on the Ukrainian side of the border with Romania, and is often claimed to be a national of those countries. However, she has stated that she is an ethnic Moldovan. A multilingual artist, she learned the Ukrainian language from her husband.) recorded in Ukrainian. The album was recorded at the Society of Carpatho-Russian Canadians hall on Queen Street West in Toronto. (Note: 280 Queen Street West was purchased in 1950 by the Alexander Duchnovych Society of Carpatho-Russian Canadians and served as a social club. The hall held many concerts and social gatherings, weekly parties with traditional food, singing, music, card games, and dancing through the evenings.) (Note: 280 Queen West was designated a heritage building in 1982.) It was released on the independent label Cansov Exchange in 1983.

Following her Canadian tour, Rotaru was prohibited from leaving the USSR for five years without explanation. This forced her to cancel an anticipated tour of Western Europe.

== Track listing ==
=== Side A ===
No.	English title	Original language title	Time
1.	"My Native Land"; Lyrics: Nikolay Petrovich Brain; Music: Brain	Ukrainian: Mij ridnyj kraj/Мій рідний край	3:44
2.	"Invite Me In Your Dreams"; Lyrics: Bohdan Stelmach; Music: Volodymyr Ivasyuk	Ukrainian: Zaprosy mene u sny/Запроси мене у сни	4:24
3.	"Maple Fire"; Lyrics: Yuriy Rybchinskiy; Music: Ivasyuk	Ukrainian: Klenovyj vohon'/Кленовий вогонь	3:12
4.	"Two Rings"; Lyrics and music: Ivasyuk	Ukrainian: Два перстені, romanized: Dva persteni	3:48
5.	"The Dance of the Water Fountain"; Lyrics and music: Ivasyuk	Ukrainian: Vodohraj/Водограй	3:13
6.	"Ivan's Gone"; Lyrics: Traditional Ukrainian Folk Song; Music: V. Taperichkin	Ukrainian: Pishov Ivan/Пішов Іван	3:30

=== Side B ===
No.	English title	Original language title	Time
1.	"Ballad about Hollyhocks"; Lyrics: Bohdan Hura; Music: Ivasyuk	Ukrainian: Balada pro mal'vy/Балада про мальви	4:00
2.	"Song Will Be Between Us"; Lyrics and Music: Ivasyuk	Ukrainian: Pisnia bude pomizh nas/Пісня буде поміж нас	3:14
3.	"I Am Your Wing"; Lyrics: Roman Kudlik; Music: Ivasyuk	Ukrainian: Ya-tvoje krylo/Я твоє крило	2:40
4.	"Road"; Lyrics and music: Kasyev	Ukrainian: Doroha/Дорога	3:58
5.	"Love Blossoms Only Once"; Lyrics: Stelmach; Music: Ivasyuk	Ukrainian: Lyshe raz tsvite liubov/Лише раз цвіте любов	3:03
6.	"Marichka"; Lyrics: Traditional Ukrainian Folk Song; Music: Taperichkin	Ukrainian: Marichka/Марічка	3:31

== See also ==
- Visit to Ukraine
- Deine Zärtlichkeit
