= Chervona Ruta (ensemble) =

Ukrainian music group

- From left to right: Alexander Leonenko, Sofia Rotaru, Anatoliy Evdokimenko

Background information
- Origin: Chernivtsi, Ukraine/USSR
- Genres: Pop, Europop, Euro disco, folk
- Years active: 1971—1990
- Labels: Melodiya (USSR); Krugozor (USSR); Sony BMG Music Entertainment (Germany)
- Past members: Sofia Rotaru; Anatoliy Evdokimenko; Alexander Leonenko; Valeriy Lyakhov

Chervona Ruta (Ukrainian: Червона рута, lit. 'Red Rue') was a Ukrainian music group that performed between 1971 and 1990. Chervona Ruta group was created in 1971 by Anatoliy Evdokimenko with the Chernivtsi Philharmonic specially for the accompaniment of Sofia Rotaru. The founding members of the group were part of the pop orchestra of the Chernivtsi University.

For a long time, outside performances of the group by itself at occasional tours, Chervona Ruta was overshadowed by the People's Artist of Ukraine, People's Artist of Moldova, People's Artist of USSR − Sofia Rotaru. After Sofia Rotaru, other widely popular artists as Arkadiy Khoralov and Meritorious Artist of Moldova Anastasia Lazariuc started their career with Chervona Ruta. In 1981, the band was awarded Grand-Prix for the high artistic level of performance at the singers' competition in Yalta.

The soloist of the band, Sofia Rotaru, became the laureate of the IXth World Festival of Youth and Students in 1971. In the same year the band was cast with Sofia Rotaru in the movie called "Chervona Ruta" and in 1975 - in Pesnya vsegda s nami.

The band has wide fan communities both in the former USSR and abroad internationally. Successful tours took place with participation of Sofia Rotaru in Bulgaria, Czechoslovakia, Hungary, Poland, GDR, Finland, West Berlin. Polish theatre critic observer Andrzej Wołczkowski wrote:

Rotaru was the windfall for the pop music scene of any country. The charm and talent of Sofia do not bring any doubt. With a powerful voice of great compass, she conquers with her sincerity, lyricism and dramatism. We were leaving the concert hall unwillingly. We wanted Sofia to present us one more song or to perform for bis "Chervona Ruta" of Ivasyuk, or the fiery Ioane, or L'immensità of Backy.
