= Teche voda =

Studio album by Sofia Rotaru
- Released: January 1, 2004 (Ukraine) available worldwide
- Recorded: 2004, Artur Music, Ukraine
- Genre: Pop, Dance
- Length: 71:59
- Label: Franchising records, Ukraine
- Producer: Sofia Rotaru

Sofia Rotaru chronology
| What's The Heart's Weather (2007) | Teche voda (2004) | You Are My Heart (2007) |

Teche voda is a studio album by Sofia Rotaru, recorded at Franchising records in Ukraine. The album entered in the 10 Best Albums of 2004 in Ukraine.

== Track listing ==
| # | English title | Original language title | Time |
|---|---|---|---|
| 1. | “Water Flows” Lyrics: Yuriy Rybchinskiy; Music: I. Poklad | Ukrainian: Teche Voda/Тече вода | 3:52 |
| 2. | “Day Passes” Lyrics: Yuriy Rybchinskiy; Music: М. Мозговий | Ukrainian: Minae Deni/Минає день | 4:15 |
| 3. | “White Daffodils” Lyrics: V. Krishenko; Music: G. Tatarchenko | Ukrainian: Bili Nartsissi/Білі нарциси | 3:48 |
| 4. | “The Song Will Be With Us” Lyrics: V. Ivasyuk; Music: V. Ivasyuk | Ukrainian: Pisnya Bude Pomizh Nas/Пісня буде поміж нас | |
| 5. | “Day With You” Lyrics: R. Bratuni; Music: V. Ivasyuk | Ukrainian: Deni Z Toboyu/День з тобою | |
| 6. | “Distance-Dale” Lyrics: D. Pavlivhko; Music: V. Ivasyuk | Ukrainian: Dali-Dalina/Даль-далина | |
| 7. | “Ballade About Mallows” Lyrics: B. Gura; Music: V. Ivasyuk | Ukrainian: Balada Pro Malivi/Балада про мальви | 4:23 |
| 8. | “For The First Time” Lyrics: M. Mozgovyi; Music: M. Mozgovyi | Ukrainian: Vpershe/Вперше | 3:27 |
| 9. | “Mapple Fire” Lyrics: Yurii Rybchinskiy and M. Vanio; Music: V. Ivasyuk | Ukrainian: Klenoviy Vogoni/Кленовий вогонь | |
| 10. | “My Stork Country” Lyrics: G. Bulah; Music: I. Poklad | Ukrainian: Krayu Miy Lelichiy/Краю мій лелечий | |
| 11. | “You Are My Earth” Lyrics: Yu. Rinchinskiy; Music: O. Osadchiy | Ukrainian: Ti Zemlya Moya/Ти земле моя | 4:20 |
| 12. | “Echoing Steps” Lyrics: V. Voznyuk; Music: V. Ivasyuk | Ukrainian: Vidlunnya Krokiv/Відлуння кроків | 4:19 |
| 13. | “Two Rings” Lyrics: V. Ivasyuk; Music: V. Ivasyuk | Ukrainian: Dva Persteni/Два перстені | |
| 14. | “Destiny Has Its Spring” Lyrics: Yu. Ribchinskiy; Music: V. Ivasyuk | Ukrainian: U Doli Svoya Vesna/У долі своя весна | 3:50 |
| 15. | “Love Blooms Only Once” Lyrics: B. Stelimah; Music: V. Ivasyuk | Ukrainian: Lish Raz Tsvete Lyubov/Лиш раз цвіте любов | |
| 16. | “Come Back From Memories” Lyrics: R. Bratuni; Music: V. Ivasyuk | Ukrainian: Vernosi Iz Spogadiv/Вернись із спогадів | |
| 17. | “Talk To Me in Dreams” Lyrics: B. Stelimah; Music: V. Ivasyuk | Ukrainian: Zaprosi Mene U Sni/Запроси мене у сни | 4:36 |
| 18. | “Fortune” Lyrics: M. Tkach; Music: O. Osadchiy | Ukrainian: Fortuna/Фортуна | 4:06 |
| 19. | “Echoing Fidelity” Lyrics: V. Bliznyuk; Music: A. Svyatogorov | Ukrainian: Vidlunnya Virnosti/Відлуння вірності | |
| 20. | “Echoing Fidelity” Lyrics: V. Kudryavtsev; Music: V. Ivasyuk | Ukrainian: Povir Ocham/Повір очам | |

== Languages of performance ==
Songs are performed in Ukrainian language.
