= Rotaru =

Rotaru is a Romanian surname meaning "wheelwright". Notable people with the surname include:

- Alina Rotaru (born 1993), Romanian long jumper
- Doina Rotaru (born 1951), Romanian composer
- Elysia Rotaru (born 1984), Canadian actress
- Gabriel Rotaru (born 1971), Romanian footballer
- Ioana Rotaru (born 1984), Romanian rower
- Nicolae Rotaru (1935–2009), Romanian sport shooter
- Sofia Rotaru (born 1947), Soviet and Ukrainian singer of Moldovan descent

== See also ==
- Rotar, Rotari, transliterations of the Moldovan Cyrillic spelling Ротарь of the Moldovan equivalent of Rotaru
