= Lilia Sandulesu =

Ukrainian pop singer (born 1958)

Lilia Sandulesu PAU
- Лілія Сандулесу
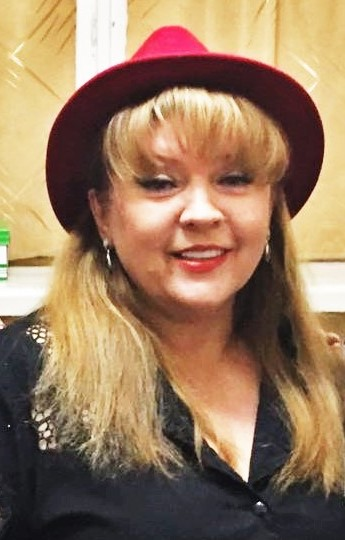
- Sandulesu in 2021
- Born: Lilia Vasylivna Sandulesu; February 28, 1958 (age 68); Marshyntsi, Chernivtsi Oblast, Ukrainian SSR, Soviet Union
- Other name: Lilia Sandulesa
- Occupation: singer
- Years active: 1977–present
- Title: People's Artist of Ukraine (1996)

Lilia Sandulesu (Ukrainian: Лілія Сандулесу; born 28 February 1958) is a Ukrainian pop singer of Romanian ethnicity. People's Artist of Ukraine (1996).

== Biography ==
Lilia Sandulesu was born in village Marshyntsi, Chernivtsi oblast in 1958. In 1977 she won a gold medal at the first all-Union festival of Amateur performance, from the same moment she was a member of the ensemble "Zhiva Voda" in the Chernivtsi Philharmonic. Since 1980 she began to sing in the Volyn Philharmonic in the ensembles "Svityaz" and "Serpanki" together with Aleksander Serov, at the same time she became famous. She was invited to government concerts in Kiev and Moscow. In 1984 she was invited to the Kiev music hall. Over time, she changed her last name to the Ukrainian manner (Sandulesa).

In 1985 she reached the final of the all-Union festival "Pesnya goda" with the song of the composer Volodymyr Bystryakov "Goncharny grug". Already in 1987 the singer was awarded the title of Honored Artist of the Ukrainian SSR.

In 1992 Sandulesu formed a creative Duo with Ivo Bobul which was popular abroad. In 1996, she was awarded the title of People's Artist of Ukraine.

Currently, she has retired from active creative activity. Lives in Chernivtsi. Since 2018 she is a member of the Radical Party of Oleh Liashko.

== Personal life ==
According to the singer, she was married six times, officially four times. In the first marriage entered in 16 years and a year later gave birth to a son. For a long time she was in a relationship with singer Aleksander Serov. She was also married to Ivo Bobul, with whom she was married for ten years.

== Discography ==
- Spochatku ty (1987)
- Bereh lyubovi (with Ivo Bobul; 1993)
- Solo Tu (2002)
- Lilia Sandulesa (2004)
