= Serdtse =

Serdtse (Russian: Сердце) means heart in Russian and may refer to

- Cape Serdtse-Kamen, a headland on the northeastern coast of Chukotka, Russia
- Serdtse (song) by Vasily Lebedev-Kumach
- Serdtse ty moe, a 2007 album by Sofia Rotaru
- Heart of a Dog (Sobachye serdtse), a 1925 novel by Mikhail Bulgakov
- Heart of a Dog (1988 film) based on the Bulgakov's novel
