= Pisnia zavzhdy z namy =

- Film poster
- Directed by: Viktor Storozhenko
- Written by: Viktor Storozhenko
- Starring: Sofia Rotaru
- Distributed by: Ukrtelefilm
- Release date: 1 January 1975
- Running time: 79 minutes
- Country: Soviet Union
- Languages: Russian, Ukrainian

Pisnia zavzhdy z namy (Ukrainian: «Пісня завжди з нами», lit. 'Song is always with us') is a 1975 Soviet musical film, produced by Viktor Storozhenko starring Sofia Rotaru in the main role, as well as Ukrainian Smerichka vocal-instrumental band. The movie features songs in Ukrainian, Romanian and Russian of Sofia Rotaru filmed in the background of Ukrainian Carpathian mountains.

== Plot ==
Filmed by Ukrainian studio of television films, the musical film Pisnia zavzhdy z namy features six songs of Volodymyr Ivasiuk, written for Sofia Rotaru. The young and beautiful singer starts a concert in a mountainous vacation resort music club in open air. This autobiographical scenario depicts true Ukrainian Moldavian origins of Sofia Rotaru in the bucolic atmosphere of melodic Northern Bukovina in Western Ukraine.

== Production ==
The filming took place in the village Ploska in Putyla Raion. The main theme of the movie is the exploration of the artistic laboratory of Sofia Rotaru, who has always affirmed that her artistic path started from a stage in a village club.

== Soundtrack ==
N°	Song	Performed by	Authors	Commentaries
1	"Cradle to the Wind"; Ukrainian: Колиска вiтру/Kolyska vitru	Sofia Rotaru	^{Lyrics: Bogdan Stelmakh; Music: Volodymyr Ivasiuk}	1975
2	"Swan Fidelity"; Russian: Лебединая верность/Lebedinaya vernost	Sofia Rotaru	^{Lyrics: Andrei Dementiev; Music: Yevgeniy Martynov}	1975, 1991, 1996
3	"Song Will Be With Us"; Ukrainian: Пiсня буде помiж нас/Pisnia bude pomizh nas	Sofia Rotaru	^{Lyrics: Volodymyr Ivasiuk; Music: Volodymyr Ivasiuk}	1974, 1977, 1997 featuring the first modern back-stage dancing in the USSR
4	"My Late Love"; Romanian: Iubirea mea târzie	Sofia Rotaru	^{Lyrics: Ion and Petru Teodorovici; Music: Efim Ciuntu}	
5	"Your Steps"; Russian: Твои следы/Tvoi sledy	Sofia Rotaru	^{Lyrics: Yevgeniy Evtushenko; Music: Arno Babadzhanyan}	1975
6	"Say That You Love"; Ukrainian: Скажи, що любиш/Skazhy, shcho liubysh	Sofia Rotaru	^{Lyrics: Serguey Kocherga; Music: Nino Rota}	1972, 1975; Sofia Rotaru was forbidden to record at Ariola (today Sony BMG Music Entertainment) the English cover of The Godfather's theme in English language by the Soviet concert administration in early 1970s as she was touring Germany.
7	"Memories"; Russian: Воспоминание/Vospominanie	Sofia Rotaru	^{Lyrics: Igor Kokhanovsky; Music: Boris Rychkov}	1974
