= Wow (Ruslana song) =

Single by Ruslana

from the album Euphoria
- Released: 17 April 2011 (Ukraine)
- Recorded: 2011
- Genre: pop, funk, rap
- Length: 3:19
- Label: Luxen Studios/Comp Music/EMI
- Songwriter(s): Ruslana, Alexander Ksenofontov, Vlad DeBriansky
- Producer(s): Ruslana, Jack Spade

Ruslana singles chronology
"Ja jdu za toboju" (2011)	"Wow" (2011)

"WOW" is the title of Ruslana's single released on 17 April 2011 in Ukraine. The track was produced in Los Angeles by producer Jack Spade.

The song was written by Ruslana with Alexander Ksenofontov (TFC band leader and the singer's husband) and Vlad DeBriansky (Jack Spade, TFC band lead guitar). The feature of the single was the part of the "March Chernomor" from Glinka's 1842 opera Ruslan and Ludmila - one of the most popular and recognizable Slavic motive in the world.

== Music video ==
The shooting took place on the Kyiv Lenin Smithy ship building plant. The music video was directed by Semen Gorov (Ukraine). Director of photography was Brandon Cox, who has worked with Eminem, Jessica Alba, T-Pain, Chris Brown, Lil Mama, and Linkin Park.

== Charts ==
Chart	Peak Position
Ukraine Top 40	7
Europe Official Top 100	79
