= Mélancolie =

Mélancolie may refer to:

- "Melancolie", a Soviet-Moldovan song
- "Melancolie", a song by Peppino di Capri
- "Mélancolie", a song by Yves Duteil
- "Mélancolie", a 2014 song by Soprano (rapper)
