= Don't Walk Away =

Don't Walk Away may refer to:

- Don't Walk Away (EP), an EP by Bullet for My Valentine
- "Don't Walk Away" (Electric Light Orchestra song), 1980
- "Don't Walk Away" (Rick Springfield song), 1984
- "Don't Walk Away" (Pat Benatar song), 1988
- "Don't Walk Away" (Toni Childs song), 1988
- "Don't Walk Away" (Jade song), 1992, later covered by Javine, 2004
- "Don't Walk Away", a song by the Four Tops from the album Tonight!, 1981
- "Don't Walk Away", a song by Bad English from the album Bad English, 1989
- "Don't Walk Away", a song by Danger Danger from the album Danger Danger, 1989
- "Don't Walk Away", a song by Michael Jackson from Invincible, 2001
- "Don't Walk Away", a song from the play What's Done in the Dark by Tyler Perry, 2006
- "Don't Walk Away", a song by Sofia Rotaru from the album Ya – tvoya lybov'!, 2008
- "Don't Walk Away", a song by Basshunter from the album Bass Generation, 2009
- "Don't Walk Away", a song from the soundtrack Hannah Montana: The Movie, 2009
- "Don't Walk Away", a song by Kim Jaejoong from the album WWW, 2013
