= This is Euphoria =

Single by Ruslana

from the album My Boo! (Together)
- Released: 7 August 2013 (Belgium)
- Recorded: Stockholm, Sweden
- Genre: Pop
- Length: 3:57
- Label: EMI
- Songwriters: Ruslana, Stefan Örn
- Producers: Ruslana, Stefan Örn

Ruslana singles chronology
"Moon of Dreams" (2008)	"This is Euphoria" (2013)

Ruslana Ukrainian singles chronology
"Miy brat" (2012)	"Eyforija" (2012)

"This is Euphoria" (Ukrainian: «Це – Ей-Форі-Я!», lit. 'It's Euphoria') is a single released by Ruslana, featured on her 2013 studio album My Boo! (Together). The arrangement and recording were done in Stockholm, Sweden.

== Music video ==
The music video differs from all the previous clips of Ruslana as she attempts to raise awareness about the social problems of Ukraine, especially the lawlessness. The action is set in the near future of the country when the lives of every citizen is affected by the corrupt judicial system. Ruslana is thrown into jail on political reasons but she doesn't give up and fights until she brakes out thanks to her state of euphoria. The video was shot inside a former political jail located within the Kyiv Fortress.

== Chart performance ==
Chart	Peak Position
Europe (Official Top 100)	80
Ukraine (Airplay)	9
Ukraine (FDR top 20)	4

== Release history ==
Region	Date	Format
Belgium	7 August 2013	Digital download
