= Visit to Ukraine =

Studio album by Sofia Rotaru
- Released: 1975 (Canada, United States & worldwide)
- Recorded: 1975,
- Genre: Pop, Dance
- Length: 34:23
- Language: Ukrainian
- Label: APON, Canada
- Producer: Sofia Rotaru

Sofia Rotaru chronology
Sofia Rotaru performs songs of Vladimir Ivasyuk (1978)	Visit to Ukraine (1975)	Only For You (1979)

Visit to Ukraine is the first studio album by Sofia Rotaru, released by the APON label in 1975 in Canada and United States with ten tracks. The album is one of the earliest releases of the singer abroad.

== Track listing ==
#	English title	Original language title	Time
1.	"Chervona Ruta"; Lyrics: Music:	Ukrainian: Chervona Ruta/Червона рута	
2.	"Grey Bird"; Lyrics: Music:	Ukrainian: Sizokriliy Ptakh/Сизокрилий птах»	
3.	"Autumn Walks in Carpathian"; Lyrics: Music: rchenko	Ukrainian: U Karpatakh khodit oseni/У Карпатах ходить осінь	
4.	"Two Rings"; Lyrics: Music:	Ukrainian: Dva persteni/Два перстені	
5.	"Yellow Leaf"; Lyrics: Music:	Ukrainian: Zhyovtyi list/Жовтий лист	
6.	"Vodogray"; Lyrics: Music:	Ukrainian: Vodogray/Водограй	
7.	"Ballad about Violins"; Lyrics: Music:	Ukrainian: Ballada pro skripki/Балада про скрипки	
8.	"Dark Eye Girl"; Lyrics: Music:	Ukrainian: O, tchyorna, ya si tchyorna/О, чорна я си чорна	
9.	"Our Song"; Lyrics: Music:	Ukrainian: Pisnya bude nami/Пісня буде з нами	
10.	"Ivan Kupala Day"; Lyrics: Music:	Ukrainian: Na Ivana Kupala/На Івана Купала	

== Languages of performance ==
Songs are performed in Ukrainian language.

== See also ==
- Canadian Tour 1983
