= L'immensità =

1967 song

"L'Immensità"

Single by Johnny Dorelli

from the album L'Immensità
- A-side: "L'Immensità"
- B-side: "Soltanto Il Sottoscritto"
- Released: 1967
- Genre: Pop, Rhythm & Blues
- Label: CGD
- Songwriter: Don Backy

"L'immensità" (in English: The Immensity) is a 1967 Italian song, which was first presented in a double performance by Johnny Dorelli and Don Backy at the 17th Sanremo Music Festival, placing ninth. It represents a signature song for both Backy and Dorelli, entering for several weeks in the Italian charts.

== L'immensità/Soltanto Il Sottoscritto ==
Johnny Dorelli inserted the song in 1967 45s L'immensità/Soltanto Il Sottoscritto and in 1967 33s L'Immensità. "Soltanto Il Sottoscritto" is a Rhythm And Blues song, written by the same Johnny Dorelli.

== Mina version ==
"L'immensità"

Single by Mina

from the album Sabato sera – Studio Uno '67
- Language: Italian
- B-side: "Canta ragazzina"
- Released: February 1967
- Genre: Pop
- Length: 2:36
- Label: Ri-Fi
- Composers: Don Backy; Detto Mariano
- Lyricist: Mogol

Mina singles chronology
"Mi sei scoppiato dentro il cuore" (1966)	"L'immensità" (1967)	"Conversazione" (1967)

In 1967, the song was re-recorded by Italian singer Mina. She performed the song live for the first time on the TV show Sabato sera on 22 April 1967, where she was also the host; in May, Mina's album Sabato sera – Studio Uno '67 was released, which also included this song.

Released as a single, the song failed to perform well, spending two weeks on the Italian chart and taking the fourteenth place. The B-side was "Canta ragazzina", another song from 1967 Sanremo Music Festival, performed in the original by Bobby Solo and Connie Francis, which did not even make it to the final. Mina recorded both songs in Spanish as "La inmensidad" and "Canta muchachita" (the author of the adapted lyrics is unknown).

=== Track listing ===
7" single
A. "L'immensità" – 2:36
B. "Canta ragazzina" (Claudio Marcello Depedrini 'Prog', Iller Pattacini, Carlo Donida) – 3:06

=== Charts ===
Chart performance for "L'immensità" by Mina
Chart (1967)	Peak position
Italy (Musica e dischi)	14

== Other cover versions ==
The song was later covered by a number of artists.

- Clara Nunes – Brazil version in Portugal as A Imensidão included in the 1967 7", EP Clara Nunes.
- Milva Video
- Sofia Rotaru twice: in Italian and in Ukrainian as "Grey Bird". The Ukrainian version became part of the 1971 movie Chervona Ruta and was released in the 2003 LP album Yedinomu in the remastered version.
- Lili Ivanova – version in Bulgarian as В безкрайността included in the 1969 LP album Camino.
- Francesco Renga
- Elena Roger
- Mónica Naranjo - version in Spanish titled "Inmensidad", included in the 2000 album Minage.
- The Flemish singer Licia Fox, sang a cover of this piece, in Italian language (2014)
- Italian trio Il Volo at Sanremo Music Festival 2015
- South Korean crossover group Forestella covered it on their debut album, Evolution.
