= Ivo Bobul =

Ukrainian singer (born 1953)

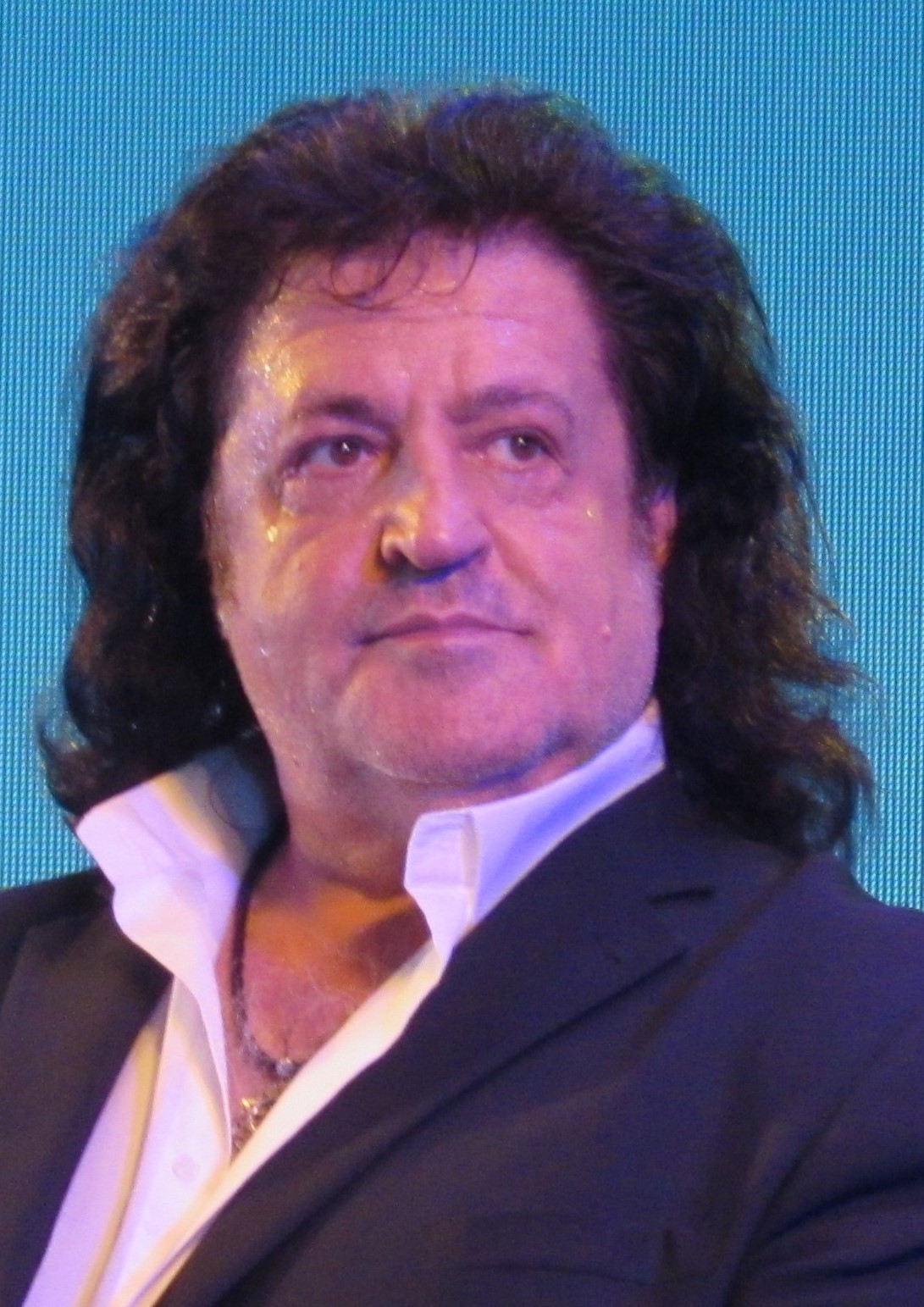
- Ivo Bobul in 2020

Background information
- Born: Ivan Vasylyovych Bobul; 17 June 1953 (age 72); Terebleche, Ukrainian SSR, Soviet Union
- Genres: Pop
- Occupation: singer
- Years active: 1980–present

Ivan Vasylyovych Bobul (Ukrainian: Іван Васильович Бобул), professionally known as Ivo Bobul (Ukrainian: Іво Бобул; born 1953), is a Ukrainian singer of Romanian ethnicity. Bobul won the People's Artist of Ukraine award in 1998.

== Biography ==
Bobul started as a restaurant singer, before becoming part of the VIA Chernivtsi Philharmonic in 1980. A year later he moved to Live Water, where he replaced his future wife and companion on the stage Lilia Sandulesu.

Bobul was attracted by the composer Alexander Morozov, whom he joined in the composer's music center in Cherkasy. In Cherkasy, he made his first video, Ivo Bobul's Dushi Krinitsa. In 1991, Ivo returned to Chernivtsi and began singing duets with Lilia Sandulesu. In early 1998, Ivo Bobul was awarded the title of People's Artist of Ukraine.

Ivo Bobul became very famous among the youth when the band Tanok na Maidani Kongo created a sarcastic song Ivo Bobul, where the singer is presented as a superhero. In 2015, Bobul and TNMK performed the song together at a concert in honor of the band's birthday.
