= Ya – tvoya lybov'! =

Studio album by Sofia Rotaru
- Released: June 9, 2008 (Ukraine); August 7, 2008 (Russia & worldwide)
- Recorded: 2008, Artur Music, Ukraine
- Genre: Pop, Dance
- Length: 39:10
- Language: Russian
- Label: Artur Music, Ukraine
- Producer: Sofia Rotaru, SOFIA Studio

Sofia Rotaru chronology
You Are My Heart (2007)	Ya – tvoya lybov'! (2008)

Ya – tvoya lybov'! (Russian: Я — твоя любовь!) - is a 2008 studio album of Sofia Rotaru, recorded at Artur-Music in Ukraine. The album was released on 9 June 2008 in Ukraine with 11 tracks. The album includes eight earlier unreleased, but aired in charts songs, one remastered song and two new songs, never aired before the release of the album: Mozart, Look Behind and Don't Walk Away.

== Track listing ==
#	English title	Original language title	Time
1.	“I'll Call a Planet With Your Name” Lyrics: Music:	Russian: Ya Nazovu Planetu Imenem Tvoim/Я назову планету именем твоим	3:53
2.	“Don't Walk Away” Lyrics: Music:	Russian: Ne Uhodi/Не уходи»	3:04
3.	“You Are My Heart” Lyrics: Music: rchenko	Russian: Serdtse Ty Moe/Сердце ты мое	3:06
4.	“Don't Love” Lyrics: Music:	Russian: Ne Lyubi/Не люби	3:44
5.	“And We Shall Fly” Lyrics: Music:	Russian: I Poletim/И полетим	3:51
6.	“One In the World” Lyrics: Music:	Russian: Odin Na Svete/Один на свете	3:46
7.	“Unexpectedly” Lyrics: Music:	Russian: Tak Nechayanno/Так нечаянно	3:05
8.	“What's the Heart's Weather” Lyrics: Music:	Russian: Kakaya Na Serdtse Pogoda/Какая на сердце погода	3:29
9.	“Mozart” Lyrics: Music:	Russian: Motsart/Моцарт	3:27
10.	“Autumn Flowers” Lyrics: Music:	Russian: Osennie Tsvety/Осенние цветы	3:12
11.	“I Am Your Love” Lyrics: Music:	Russian: Ya - Tvoya Lyubovi!/Я — твоя любовь!	3:51

== Gift Album ==
On the 7th of August, birthday of Sofia Rotaru, was also released a parallel, not for sale, gift album with extended track listing, including two earlier unreleased new songs Lilac Flowers and Look Behind.

== Languages of performance ==
Songs are performed in Russian language.
