= Kray, miy ridniy kray =

1981 song by Sofia Rotaru

"Krai"

Song by Sofia Rotaru

from the album Sofia Rotaru and Chervona Ruta
- Language: Ukrainian
- English title: "My Homeland, My Native Homeland"
- Recorded: 1979
- Studio: Melodiya, Kyiv
- Genre: Pop
- Label: Melodiya
- Songwriter: Mykola Mozghovyi
- Producer: Sofia Rotaru

"Kray, miy ridniy kray" (Ukrainian: «Край, мій рідний край», lit. 'My homeland, my native homeland') is a song originally recorded by Sofia Rotaru for her 1981 album Sofia Rotaru and Chervona Ruta.

== Description ==
According to the Ukrainian and Russian press, the song became a major hit in 1979, the year of its first performance. It was first performed on 10 November 1979 at concert commemorated to the Day of Soviet Militsiya at Pillar Hall of the House of the Unions in Moscow. It was the second such achievement for a Ukrainian song within the former USSR and internationally, after the song "Chervona Ruta". The lyrics and the music were composed by Mykola Mozghovyi. The song remains popular today with numerous recorded cover versions, namely by Ani Lorak and Taisia Povaliy. Ruslana, the winner of the Eurovision Song Contest 2004 also made a cover of the song in collaboration with the Balkan musician Goran Bregovich.

Among others, the song was released as a 1979 extended play (EP) Moy Kray (Мой край/My Homeland) by Melodiya, as a flexi by Krugozor No 7 in 1981 and was also included in numerous films and concert programmes, such as Vas priglashayet Sofia Rotaru of 1986. A modern remixed version of the song appears on track 14 of the 2003 album Yedinomu. In 1980, Sofia Rotaru enters the final of the 1980 Song of the Year with the original version for the song.

The name of the song is Krai which in the Ukrainian language means the land with implication of a homeland. The song tells about the land of Prykarpattia between the rivers of Cheremosh and Prut.

== Recording ==
The original track was recorded at Kyiv studios of Melodiya.

== See also ==
- Melancolie
