= Where Has Love Gone? (album) =

Studio album by Sofia Rotaru
- Released: 1981 (USSR) available worldwide
- Recorded: 1981, Melodiya, USSR
- Genre: Pop, Dance
- Label: Melodiya, USSR
- Producer: Sofia Rotaru

Sofia Rotaru chronology
Only For You (1979)	Where Has Love Gone? (1981)	Sofia Rotaru and Chervona Ruta (1981)

Where Has Love Gone? is a studio album by Sofia Rotaru, recorded at Melodiya in the USSR. The album consists of soundtracks to the film Where Has Love Gone?.

== Track listing ==
#	English title	Original language title	Time
1.	"Red Arrow"; Lyrics: Music:	Russian: Krasnaja strela/Красная стрʲела	:
2.	"First Rain"; Lyrics: Music:	Russian: Pʲervyj doždʲ/Первый дождь	:
3.	"Beginning of May"; Lyrics: Music:	Russian: Načalo maja/Начало мая	:
4.	"Special Friend"; Lyrics: Music:	Russian: Osobyj drug/Особый друг	
5.	"Where Has Love Gone?"; Lyrics: Music:	Russian: Gdʲe ty, lʲubovʲ?/Где ты, любовь?	
6.	"Everything as Always"; Lyrics: Music:	Russian: Vsʲo, kak vsʲegda/Всё, как всегда	
7.	"Come"; Lyrics: Music:	Romanian: Să vii/Сэ вий	:
8.	"John"; Lyrics: Music:	Romanian: Ioane/Иоане	:
8.	"Don't Forget"; Lyrics: Music:	Russian: Nʲe zabyvaj/Не забывай	:

== Languages of performance ==
Songs are performed in Russian and Romanian languages.

== See also ==
- Where Has Love Gone? (song)
