= Monologue of Love (film) =

- Written by: Grigore Vieru
- Directed by: Larisa Maslyuk
- Starring: Sofia Rotaru
- Music by: Arnold Svyatogorov, Tatyana Dikareva and others
- Country of origin: Soviet Union
- Original languages: Ukrainian; Russian; Romanian

Production
- Producer: Larisa Maslyuk
- Running time: 71 minutes
- Production company: Ukrtelefilm

Original release
- Release: 1 January 1986

Monologue of Love is a Soviet musical telefilm, written by Grigore Vieru and directed by Larisa Maslyuk, starring Sofia Rotaru in the main role. The movie filmed at Ukretelefilm (Ukrainian Studio of Television Films - Gosteleradio 1986) in Crimea (Ukrainian SSR), Kazakh SSR and Lithuanian SSR, features the new conception in the Soviet musical telefilms: substantial poetry monologues recited by Sofia Rotaru on themes associated with love, followed by thematic songs and corresponding natural geographical and theatrical scenic setting.

== Plot ==
The conceptual base are the poetic monologues read by Sofia Rotaru playing herself, singer. The monologues were read by Sofia Rotaru in Russian, whereas their author, G. Vieru, has supposedly written them in Romanian beforehand. In between the monologues, adapted music videos appear in all different kinds of scenery from Kazakh desert to Bukovinian rich green villages, passing by beautiful Crimean Black Sea and Lithuanian Baltic Sea shorelines. Sofia Rotaru performs personally in the movie without double stunt performers, namely the role of windsurfer in love, singing the song "Amor" in Romanian language.

== Soundtrack ==
Sofia Rotaru performed following songs:Echo of Fidelity, Insignificant Event, They Say, Autumn, Night, We - People, "Retro" Machine, Leaves Flew Away, In My House, Amor, The Water Flows, Give Me a Break.

Composers: I. Poklad, David Tukhmanov, A. Morozov, K. Shuaev, Arnold Svyatogorov, G. Tatarchenko, V. Laschyuk, Tatyana Dikareva, Vladimir Matetsky.

Lyrics by authors: Rasul Gamzatov, Yevgeny Yevtushenko, Andrey Voznesensky, Grigore Vieru, Yu. Rybchinskiy, I. Lazarevskiy, M. Ryabinin, V. Bliznichuk, G. Taranenko, Nikolay Rubtsov, V. Laschyuk, A. Saed-Shakh,

Music was performed by ensembles: "Chervona Ruta", "Calendar", "Forum", "Synthesis", "Display", State Pop-Symphonic Orchestra of USSR, group of violin players of the pop-symphonic orchestra of the Ukrainian Television and Radio

N°	Song	Performed by	Authors	Commentaries
1	"Theatre"; Russian: Театр/Teatr	Sofia Rotaru	^{Lyrics: Music:}	
2	"They Say"; Russian: Говорят/Govoryat	Sofia Rotaru	^{Lyrics: Music:}	
3	"Echo of Fidelity"; Russian: Эхо верности/Ekho vernosti	Sofia Rotaru	^{Lyrics: Music:}	
4	Little Incident; Russian: Маленькое происшествие/Malenikoe proishestvie	Sofia Rotaru	^{Lyrics: Music:}	
5	"Autumn"; Russian: Осень/Oseni	Sofia Rotaru	^{Lyrics: Music:}	
6	"Night"; Russian: Ночь/Nochi	Sofia Rotaru	^{Lyrics: Music:}	
7	"We - People"; Russian: Мы - люди/My - lyudi	Sofia Rotaru	^{Lyrics: Music:}	
8	"Retro Machine"; Russian: Машина "Ретро"/Mashina "Retro"	Sofia Rotaru	^{Lyrics: Music:}	
9	"Leaves Have Flown Away"; Russian: Улетели листья/Uleteli listya	Sofia Rotaru	^{Lyrics: Music:}	
10	"Water Flows"; Ukrainian: Тече вода/Teche voda	Sofia Rotaru	^{Lyrics: Music:}	
11	"Love"; Romanian: Amor	Sofia Rotaru	^{Lyrics: Music:}	
12	"Life, Send Me a Break"; Russian: Жизнь, ниспошли мне передышку/Zhizni, nisposhli mne peredyshku	Sofia Rotaru	^{Lyrics: Music:}	
13	"In My House"; Russian: В доме моем/V dome moyom	Sofia Rotaru	^{Lyrics: Music:}	

== Cast ==
- V. Stepanov, Ira Chernyaeva, Lena Sedova,
- students of villages: Rybachy in Kaliningrad Oblast, Nida in Lithuanian SSR.
- Ensemble of pop dances of the Palace of Culture of "Abay",
- actors of puppet theatre in Shevchenko, Fort-Shevchenko in Kazakh SSR,
- Vyzhnytsia in Chernivtsi Oblast,
- Gurzuf in Crimea

== Production ==
- Producer: Larisa Maslyuk
- Cameraman: Guennadiy Zubanov
- Scenario: Grigore Vieru
- The music recorded by Vladimir Leshchenko
- Responsible for movie production and processing: V. Kozyarevich, Ya. Golovach, K. Petrov, V. Kuznetsov, N. Zachipelenko, I. Bonitenko, B. Sidrochenko, V. Vorobiev, I. Gusev, A. Bilko, A. Makedon, T. Semekha, N. Svetikova, I. Sidorov
