= Sofia Rotaru and Chervona Ruta =

Studio album by Sofia Rotaru
- Released: 1981 (USSR)
- Recorded: 1981
- Studio: Melodiya, USSR
- Genre: Pop, Dance
- Label: Melodiya
- Producer: Sofia Rotaru

Sofia Rotaru chronology
Where Has Love Gone? (1981)	Sofia Rotaru and Chervona Ruta (1981)	Sofia Rotaru 1982 (1982)

Sofia Rotaru and Chervona Ruta is a 1981 studio album by Sofia Rotaru, recorded at Melodiya in the USSR. It is packaged together with Where Has Love Gone?, the film soundtrack for Where Has Love Gone?

== Track listing ==
#	English title	Original language title	Time
1.	"Homeland, my native homeland" Lyrics: Music:	Ukrainian: Kraj, mij ridnyj kraj/Край, мій рідний край	:
2.	"Awaiting"; Lyrics: Music:	Russian: Ožidanije/Ожидание	:
3.	"Happy Evening"; Lyrics: Music:	Romanian: Seară albastră/Сярэ албастрэ	:
4.	"Special Friend"; Lyrics: Music:	Russian: Osobyj drug/Особый друг	
5.	"I Hear Your Voice"; Lyrics: Music:	Russian: Ja slyšu golos tvoj/Я слышу голос твой	

== Languages of performance ==
Songs are performed in Russian, Ukrainian (1, 8) and Romanian (4, 5, 7, 9) languages.
