= Sofia Rotaru poet pesni Vladimira Ivasyuka =

Sofia Rotaru Performs Songs of Volodymyr Ivasyuk

Studio album by Sofia Rotaru
- Released: 1978 (USSR) available worldwide
- Recorded: 1978, Melodiya, USSR
- Genre: Pop, Dance
- Length: ???
- Label: Melodiya, USSR
- Producer: Sofia Rotaru

Sofia Rotaru chronology
Swan Fidelity (1977)	Sofia Rotaru Performs Songs of Volodymyr Ivasyuk (1978)	Sofia Rotaru 1978 (1981)

Second release with Ukrainian title

Sofia Rotaru poёt pesni Vladimira Ivasyuka (literally: Sofia Rotaru Performs Songs of Volodymyr Ivasyuk) is a studio album of Sofia Rotaru, recorded at Melodiya in the USSR in 1978. Sofia Rotaru was awarded the grand prix of the Central Committee of Komsomol for this album, which became the reference in Ukrainian pop culture. Russian title: Sofia Rotaru poёt pesni Vladimira Ivasyuka Ukrainian title: Pisni Volodimira Ivasyuka spivae Sofia Rotaru

== Track listing ==
#	English title	Original language title	Time
1.	"I am your wing" Lyrics: Music:	Ukrainian: Ya tvoye krylo/Я - твоє крило	:
2.	"Ballad about Mallows"; Lyrics: Music:	Ukrainian: Balada pro malvy/Балада про мальви	:
3.	"Song Will Be With Us"; Lyrics: Music:	Ukrainian: Pisnia bude pomizh nas/Пісня буде поміж нас	:
4.	"Destiny has its Own Spring"; Lyrics: Music:	Ukrainian: U doli svoya vesna/У долі своя весна	
5.	"Wind Cradle"; Lyrics: Music:	Ukrainian: Kolyska vitru/Колиска вітру	

== Languages of performance ==
All the songs are performed in Ukrainian language.
