= Rotari =

Rotari may refer to:

- Olga Rotari (born 1989), Moldovan classical musician
- Rotari, Transnistria, a commune in Moldova
- Pietro Rotari (1707-1762), Italian painter of the Baroque period
- Valeriu Rotari. Moldavian businessman and a football club owner, and an alleged crime boss

== See also ==
- Rotaru
- Rotar
