= Teodor Bordeianu =

20th Century Romanian agronomist and academic

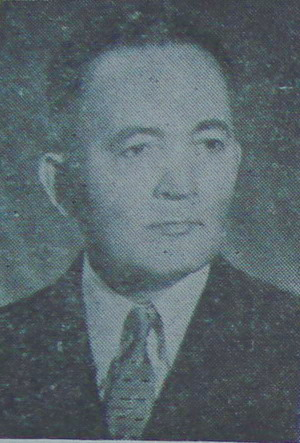

Teodor Bordeianu (16 February 1902 – 19 March 1969) was a Romanian agronomist and pomologist who was a titular member of the Romanian Academy.

He was born in the village of Marșenița, which is today in Ukraine, and died in Bucharest, Romania.
