= Tuman (album) =

Studio album by Sofia Rotaru
- Released: January 1, 2007 (Ukraine) available worldwide
- Recorded: 2007, Artur Music, Ukraine
- Genre: Pop, Dance
- Length: ???
- Label: Artur Music, Ukraine
- Producer: Sofia Rotaru

Sofia Rotaru chronology
What's The Heart's Weather (2007)	Tuman (2007)	You Are My Heart (2007)

Tuman is a studio album of Sofia Rotaru released in the very beginning of 2007. The CD includes mostly unreleased, but already aired songs, although only a selection of them. It is a multilingual album, hence traditional edition for Sofia Rotaru. It includes popular duet with Nikolay Baskov "Raspberries Blossom" and dance remix of "White Dance", which marked in 2001 a new wave in the repertoire of Sofia Rotaru. The last song of the album "One Guelder Rose (or One Snowball Tree) was one of the most popular songs of Sofia Rotaru in Ukrainian for the last three years.

== Track listing ==
#	English title	Original language title	Time
1.	“Fog” Writer(s): Producer(s):	Ukrainian: Tuman/Туман	
2.	“I Loved Him” Writer(s): Valery Meladze; Producer(s): Sofia Rotaru	Russian: Ya zhe Ego Lyubila/Я же его любила	
3.	“White Dance” Writer(s): Producer(s):	Russian: Belyi Tanets/Белый танец	
4.	“You Will Fly Away” Writer(s): Producer(s):	Russian: Ty Uletishi/Ты улетишь	
5.	“Moscow” Writer(s): Producer(s):	Russian: Moskva/Москва	
6.	“Cherry Orchard” Writer(s): Producer(s):	Russian: Vishnyovyi Sad/Вишнёвый сад	
7.	“Autumn Flowers” Writer(s): Producer(s):	Russian: Osennie Tsvety/Осенние цветы	
8.	“Raspberries Blossom” in duet with Nikolay Baskov; Writer(s): Producer(s):	Russian: Tsvetyot Malina/Цветёт малина	
9.	“You Won't Buy Love” together with Valery Meladze, Verka Serduchka and VIA Gra; Writer(s): Valery Meladze; Producer(s):	Russian: Lyubovi Ne Kupishi/Любовь не купишь	
10.	“Sky - It's Me” Writer(s): Producer(s):	Russian: Nebo ) Eto Ya/Небо - это Я	
11.	“You Call Me” Writer(s): Producer(s):	Russian: Ty Pozovi Menya/Позови меня	
12.	“White Winter” Writer(s): Producer(s):	Russian: Belaya Zima/Белая зима	
13.	“Find Me” Writer(s): Producer(s):	Russian: Naydi Menya/Найди меня	
14.	“Light Rain” Writer(s): Producer(s):	Russian: Dozhdik/Дождик	
15.	“White Dance ) dance remix” Writer(s): Producer(s):	Russian: Belyi Tanets/Белый танец	
16.	“Five Minutes” Writer(s): Producer(s):	Russian: Pyati Minut/Пять минут	
17.	“One Year For Ten” Writer(s): Producer(s):	Russian: God Za Desyati/Год за десять	
18.	“Wait” Writer(s): Producer(s):	Ukrainian: Chekay/Чекай	
19.	“One Viburnum” Writer(s): Producer(s):	Ukrainian: Odna Kalyna/Одна Калина	

== Languages of performance ==
Songs 1, 18 and 19 are performed in Ukrainian language, all the other songs are performed in Russian language.
