= Tolko tebe =

Only for You

Studio album by Sofia Rotaru
- Released: 1979 (USSR) available worldwide
- Recorded: 1979, Melodiya, USSR
- Genre: Pop, dance
- Length: ???
- Label: Melodiya, USSR
- Producer: Sofia Rotaru

Sofia Rotaru chronology
Visit to Ukraine (1975)	Only for You (1979)	Where Has Love Gone? (1981)

Only for You is a studio album by Sofia Rotaru, recorded at Melodiya in the USSR in 1979. This is one of the rare works where her first name is spelled as Sophia instead of Sofia.

== Track listing ==
#	English title	Original language title	Time
1.	"John, John"; Lyrics: Music:	Romanian: Ioane, Ioane/ Иоане, Иоане	02:49
2.	"Spring"; Lyrics: Music:	Romanian: Primăvară/Примэварэ	03:45
3.	"Echo of Your Steps"; Lyrics: Music:	Ukrainian: Vidlunnʲa tvojix krokiv/Відлуння твоїх кроків	03:24
4.	"Give Me the Wings"; Lyrics: Music:	Russian: Daj krylʲia mnʲe/Дай крылья мне	04:54
5.	"Road"; Lyrics: Music:	Ukrainian: Doroha/Дорога	04:08
6.	Lyrics: Music:	Ukrainian: Čerešnevа haj/Черешнева гай	02:55
7.	"Common Story"; Lyrics: Music:	Russian: Obyčnaja istorija/Обычная история	05:20
8.	"Only For You"; Lyrics: Music:	Russian: Tolʲko tʲebʲe/Только тебе	05:23
9.	"Believe Me"; Lyrics: Music:	Romanian: Crede mă/Креде мэ	03:36

== Languages of performance ==
Songs are performed in Russian, Ukrainian and Romanian languages.
