= Vlad (musician) =

Vlad De Briansky Влад Дебрянський

Background information
- Also known as: Vlad, Jack Spade
- Born: Volodymyr Mykhailovych Debrianskyi; January 3, 1972 (age 54); Kalush, Ukrainian SSR
- Genres: Jazz, blues, rock, classical
- Occupations: Guitarist; producer; composer; lyricist; actor; educator; scientist
- Instruments: Guitars; bass; piano; drums; keyboards; vocals
- Years active: 1991–present
- Labels: Orpheus, EMI, Warner, Unis Records
- Website: www.debriansky.com

Vlad De Briansky (born Volodymyr Mykhailovych Debrianskyi, (Note: Ukrainian: Володимир Михайлович Дебрянський, romanized: Volodymyr Mykhailovych Debrianskyi) January 3, 1972; known professionally as Vlad) is an American guitarist, composer, and educator. He is also an actor, record producer and a television producer. He plays blues, jazz, rock, and classical music.

== Music biography ==
Born in Ukraine, but moved to the United States to attend Berklee College of Music in Boston, Massachusetts In 2004 he releases his debut album 'Vladosphere" on Orpheus Music label.

His second solo album Sun In Capricorn was released in 2007.

In the fall of 2009 History Channel aired a series "Nostradamus Effect: Da Vinci's Armageddon" - where Vlad plays Leonardo da Vinci.

In 2010 Vlad meets and collaborates with a Hollywood actor Patrick Bergin whom he invites to his project "Jacks Last Dollar".

== Discography ==
- Vlad De Briansky (2023), Live At Lobero Theatre, Dreamland Bros.
- Vlad De Briansky (2023), Texas Heat (single), Dreamland Bros.
- Vlad De Briansky (2020), Dreamland, Vlad De Briansky
- Vlad (2018), Dead Without You (single), Unis Records
- Ray Brown Jr. (2018), This Is Ray Brown Jr., SRI Records
- Vlad (2018), For You (single), Unis Records
- Vlad (2016), Blues, Unis Records
- Jacks Last Dollar (2014), II, Unis Records
- Jacks Last Dollar (2014), Part I, Unis Records
- Jack Spade (2013), Love in Vegas (single), Unis Records
- Ruslana (2013), My Boo (Together!), EMI
- Vlad (2012), Tangled (single), Unis Records
- Ruslana (2011), Wow, ShaLaLa, EMI
- Jack Spade (2010), Silver Moon (single), Unis Records
- TFC (2010), Give Me a Scream, Tears of Gods (single), EMI
- Antonia Bennett (2010), Things We Do for Love, Knightlife Music
- Vlad (2007), Sun in Capricorn, Orpheus
- Vlad (2004), Vladosphere, Orpheus
- Freddie Jackson (2000), Life After 30, Orpheus
- Miki Howard (1997), Can't Count Me Out, Atlantic/Abili/Hush
- Ruslana (1996), In an Instant of Spring. Sonorous Wind, EMI
- Loony Pelen (1994), Amok, Molem Music
- Anzhelika Korshinska and Grav' Biser (1993-11-17), Anzhelika Korshinska, Studio Leva
- Tea Fan Club (Клуб Шанувальників Чаю) (1993), Mystery Mirror, TFC
