= Mykola Mozghovyi =

Mykola Mozghovyi Микола Мозговий
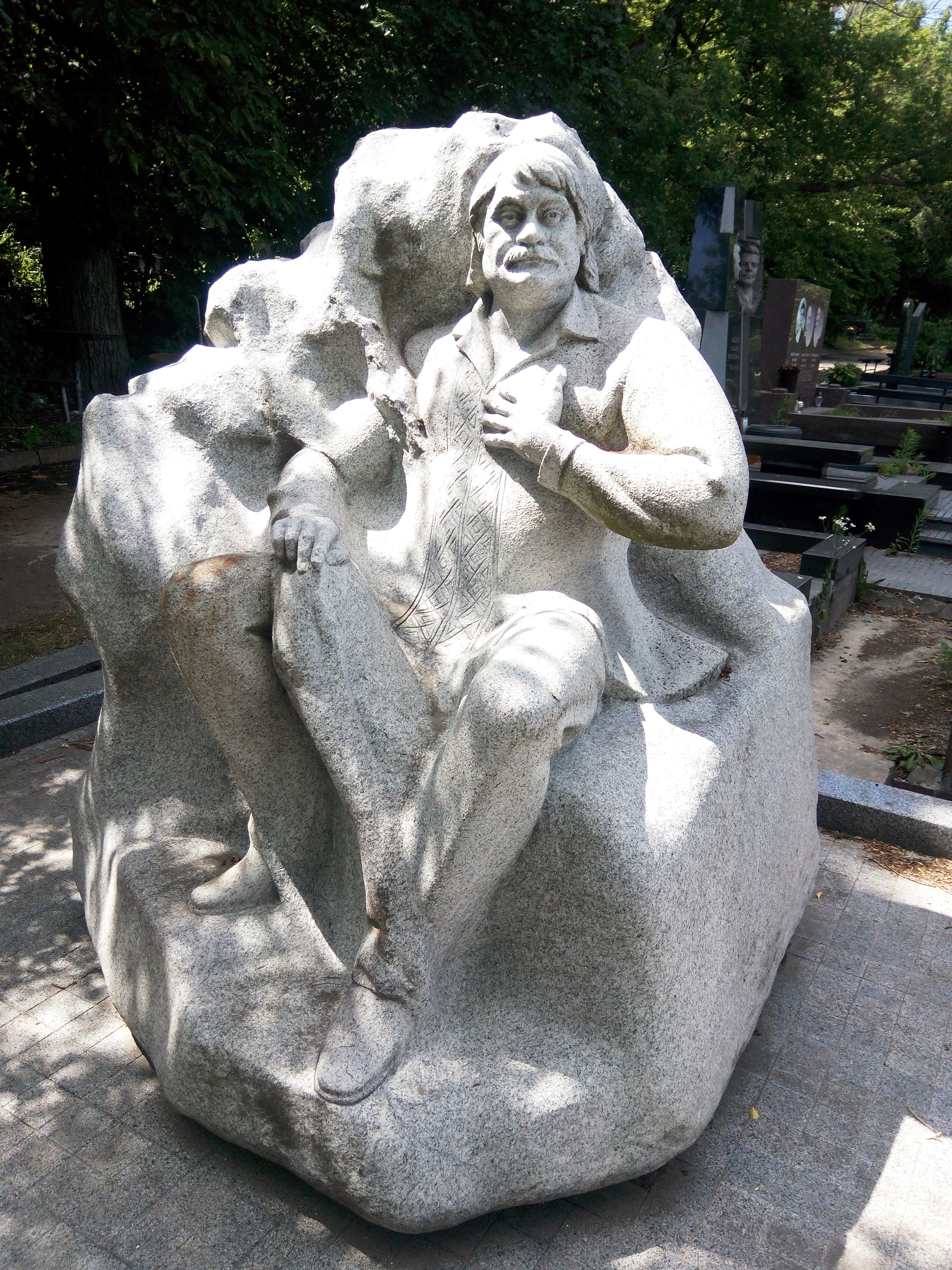
- Grave in Baikove Cemetery

Background information
- Born: 1 September 1947; Sarniv, Ukrainian SSR, Soviet Union
- Died: 30 July 2010 (aged 62) Kyiliv, Ukraine
- Genres: Pop; Dance; Electronica; Folk; Rap
- Occupations: Singer-songwriter; Record producer; Author
- Instruments: Guitar; Piano
- Years active: 1971–2010

Mykola Petrovych Mozghovyi (Note: Ukrainian: Микола Петрович Мозговий; Russian: Николай Петрович Мозговой, romanized: Nikolay Petrovich Mozgovoy) (1 September 1947 – 30 July 2010) was a Ukrainian and Soviet composer, producer, and songwriter.

He was born in Sarniv, Volochysk Raion, Khmelnytskyi Oblast, Ukraine.

Mozhovyy's major success was the song "Kray, miy ridniy kray", written for Sofia Rotaru and produced by Melodiya.

He was a manager of Palace "Ukraine" in 2000s.

== Sources ==
- "Composer Nikolai Mozgovoy, author of Sofia Rotaru's hit, is dead". RIA Novosti. July 30, 2010.
