= Yedynomu =

Єдиному "Yedynomu"

Studio album by Sofia Rotaru
- Released: 2003 (Ukraine, Russia & worldwide)
- Recorded: Artur-Music
- Genres: Pop, dance
- Languages: Ukrainian, Romanian
- Labels: Artur-Music, (Ukraine)
- Producer: Sofia Rotaru

Sofia Rotaru chronology
Snezhnaya koroleva (2002)	Єдиному "Yedynomu" (2003)

Yedynomu (Ukrainian: Єдиному, Russian: Единому — literally "To the Only One") - is the third studio album of Sofia Rotaru, recorded in Ukraine. The album was released in 2003 in Ukraine and Russia with 16 tracks with consequent worldwide release. This album appeared after a pause in Rotaru's career caused by the death of her husband Anatoliy Evdokimenko and is a tribute to his memory.

The album includes major super hits of the 1970s to 1990s period of the joint life and working partnership of Sofia Rotaru and Anatoliy Evdokimenko. Anatoliy was a long-time working partner, helping to direct and produce many of her songs. The album was released exactly on the anniversary of death of her husband As of January 2004, more than 2,000,000 copies were sold.

== Track listing ==
No.	Title	Lyrics	Music	Length
1.	"One Guelder Rose" (Ukrainian: Одна калина "Odna kalyna")	Vitaliy Kurovsky	Ruslan Kvinta	4:06
2.	"Chervona Ruta" (Ukrainian: Червона рута "Chervona ruta")	Volodymyr Ivasyuk	Volodymyr Ivasyuk	4:22
3.	"Melancolie (Sofia Rotaru song)" (Romanian: Melancolie)	G. Vieru	P. Teodorovych	4:49
4.	"Two Rings" (Ukrainian: Два перстенi "Dva persteni")	Volodymyr Ivasyuk	Volodymyr Ivasyuk	4:01
5.	"Happy Evening" (Romanian: Seară albastră)			4:39
6.	"Ivan" (Romanian: Ioane)	Moldavian folk song	Moldavian folk song	3:54
7.	"Grey-winged Bird" (Ukrainian: Сизокрилий птах "Syzokryly ptakh")	Roman Kudlyk	Don Backy
8.	"Ballad About Hollyhocks" (Ukrainian: Мальви (Балада про мальви))	Bohdan Hura	Volodymyr Ivasyuk	4:11
9.	"Prydy" (Romanian: Să vii)	D. Matkovsky	I. Aldya-Teodorovych	3:57

== Languages of performance ==
Songs are performed in Ukrainian and Romanian languages.
