= Rotar =

Rotar may refer to:

- Igor Rotar (born 1965), Russian journalist
- Leonid Rotar (born 1962), Russian artist of Moldovan descent
- Rotar (Masters of the Universe)

== See also ==
- Rotaru
- Rotari (disambiguation)
