= Marshyntsi =

Village in Chernivtsi Oblast, Ukraine

Marshyntsi Маршинці Marșenița
- Village
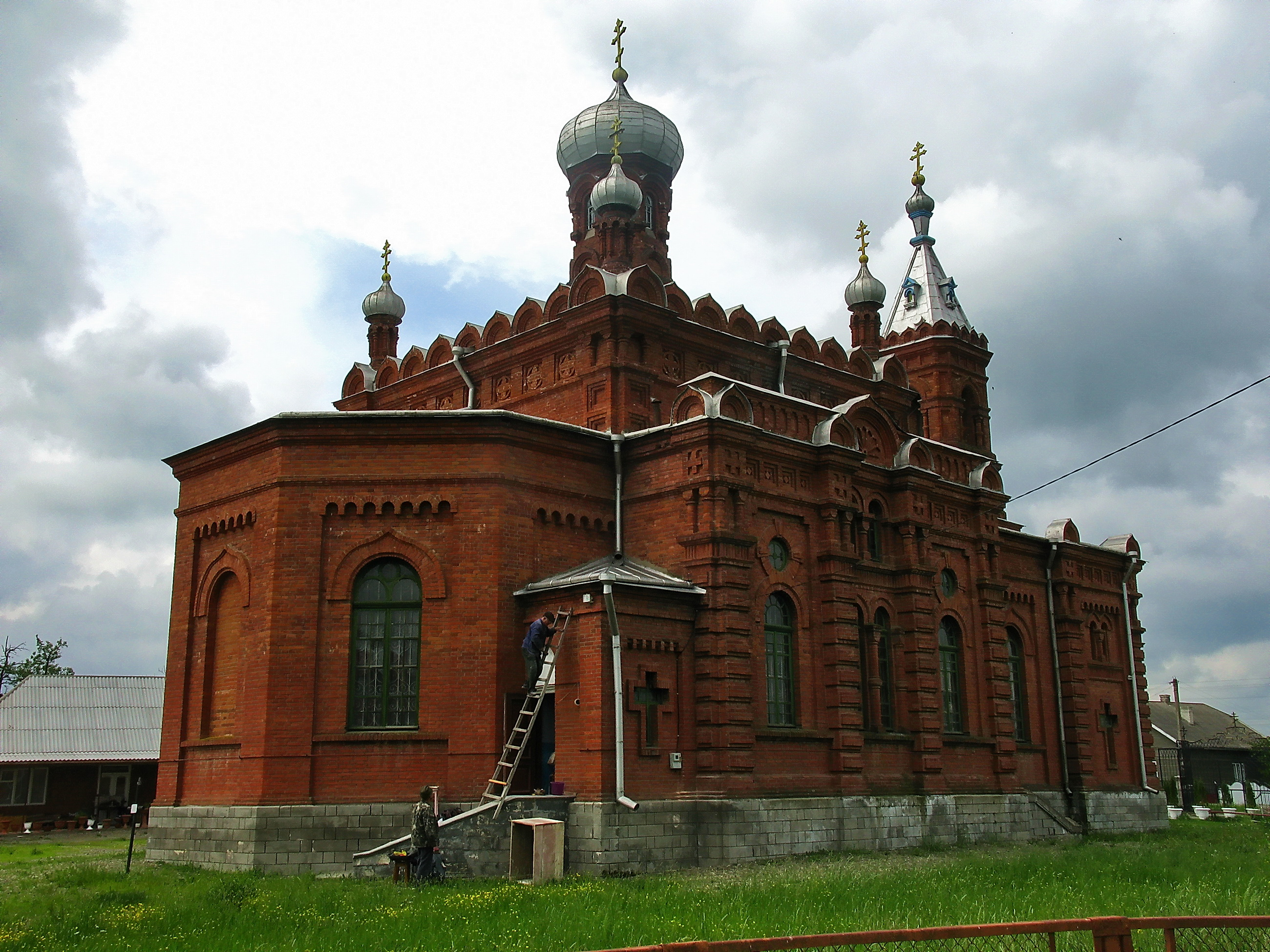
- Interactive map of Marshyntsi
- Location in Ukraine Marshyntsi (Ukraine)
- Coordinates: 48°12′42″N 26°18′11″E
- Country: Ukraine
- Oblast: Chernivtsi Oblast
- Raion: Chernivtsi Raion
- Established: 1611
- Elevation: 132 m (433 ft)

Population
  - Total: 4,620
- Time zone: UTC+2 (CET)
  - Summer (DST): UTC+3 (CEST)
- Postal code: 60309
- Area code: +380 3733

Marshyntsi (Ukrainian: Маршинці; Romanian: Marșenița) is one of the Romanian-speaking villages of the Chernivtsi Raion (district) of Chernivtsi Oblast (province) in western Ukraine (the historical region of Bessarabia). It belongs to Novoselytsia urban hromada, one of the hromadas of Ukraine.

The first written mention of this village dates back to 1611. The village lies on the left bank of the Prut River, 30 km (19 mi) southeast of Chernivtsi, near the Romania–Ukraine border.

Until 18 July 2020, Marshyntsi belonged to Novoselytsia Raion. The raion was abolished in July 2020 as part of the administrative reform of Ukraine, which reduced the number of raions of Chernivtsi Oblast to three. The area of Novoselytsia Raion was split between Chernivtsi and Dniester Raions, with Marshyntsi being transferred to Chernivtsi Raion. In 2001, 93.65% of the inhabitants spoke Romanian as their native language, while 5.1% spoke Ukrainian, and 1.21% spoke Russian.

== Notable people ==
- Teodor Bordeianu (1902–1969), Romanian agronomist and pomologist, member of the Romanian Academy
- Nataliia Lupu (born 1987), Ukrainian athlete
- Sofia Rotaru (born 1947), Ukrainian singer-songwriter, record producer, film producer, fashion designer, dancer, actress of Romanian ethnicity
- Lilia Sandulesu (born 1958), Ukrainian singer of Romanian ethnicity
