= Ya zhe yego lyubila =

Studio album by Sofia Rotaru
- Released: 2005 (Ukraine); 2005 (Russia & worldwide)
- Recorded: 2005, Artur Music, Ukraine
- Genre: Pop, Dance
- Length
- Language: Russian
- Label: Artur Music, Ukraine
- Producer: Sofia Rotaru

Sofia Rotaru chronology
Nebo – eto ya (2004)	Ya zhe yego lyubila (2005)	What's the Heart's Weather (2006)

Ya zhe yego lyubila (Russian: Я же его любила / literally: I Loved Him - is a 2005 studio album of Sofia Rotaru, recorded at Artur Music in Ukraine. The album was released in the summer of 2005 in Ukraine first with 10 tracks. The album includes 3 earlier unreleased singles, one remastered song, and 6 songs aired previously on TV shows and Musicals.

== Track listing ==
#		Original language title	Time
1.	Lyrics: Music:	Russian: Ya zh ego lyubil/Я же его любила	:
2.	Lyrics: Music:	Russian: Ty uletishi/Ты улетишь	:
3.	Lyrics: Music: rchenko	Russian: Osennie tsvety/Осенние цветы	:
4.	Lyrics: Music:	Russian: Moskva/Москва	:
5.	Lyrics: Music:	Russian: Vishnevyi Sad/Вишнёвый сад	:
6.	Lyrics: Music:	Russian: Landyshi/Ландыши	:
7.	Lyrics: Music:	Russian: Kovarnye muzhiki/Коварные мужики	:
8.	Lyrics: Music:	Russian: Belyi tanets/Белый танец	:
9.	(with V. Meladze, V. Serduchka, VIA Gra; Lyrics: Konstantin Meladze; Music: Konstantin Meladze	Russian: Lyubovi ne kupishi/Любовь не купишь	:
10.	Lyrics: Music:	Russian: Tsvetyot Malina/Цветёт малина	:

== Languages of performance ==
Songs are performed in Russian language.
