= Tender Melody =

Studio album by Sofia Rotaru
- Released: 1985 (USSR) available worldwide
- Recorded: 1985, Melodiya, USSR
- Genre: Pop, Dance
- Label: Melodiya, USSR
- Producer: Sofia Rotaru

Sofia Rotaru chronology
Canadian Tour 1983 (1983)	Tender Melody (1985)	Monologue of Love (1987)

Tender Melody is a studio album of Sofia Rotaru, recorded at Melodiya in the USSR. The album was widely acclaimed in the countries of the former USSR and the total sales amounted to more than 2 million copies.

== Track listing ==
#	English title	Original language title	Time
1.	"Flowers Shop"; Lyrics: Music:	Russian: Magazin Tsvety/Магазин «Цветы»	:
2.	"Song about my life" Lyrics: Music:	Russian: Pesnya o moei zhizni/Песня о моей жизни Romanian: Orele/Viaţa Mea	:
3.	"And the Music Plays"; Lyrics: Music:	Russian: A muzyka zvuchit/А музыка звучит	:
4.	"Tender Melody"; Lyrics: Music:	Russian: Nezhnaya melodiya/Нежная мелодия	
5.	"Sad Song"; Lyrics: Music:	Russian: Grustnaya pesnya/Грустная песня	
6.	"Lives"; Lyrics: Music:	Russian: Zhizni/Жизнь	
7.	"Slides"; Lyrics: Music:	Russian: Slaydy/Слайды	:
8.	"Romantic"; Lyrics: Music:	Romanian: Romantica	:

== Languages of performance ==
Songs are performed in Russian and Romanian languages.

== See also ==
- Tender Melody (song)
