= Anatoliy Yevdokymenko =

Ukrainian musician (1942–2002)

Anatoliy Yevdokymenko Анатолій Євдокименко
- Born: 20 January 1942; Kapitanivka, Transnistria Governorate
- Origin: Ukraine
- Died: 23 October 2002 (aged 60) Kyiv, Ukraine
- Genres: Pop, dance, folk, R&B
- Occupations: Singer-songwriter, musician, record producer, film producer, author
- Instrument: Trumpet
- Years active: 1968–2002

Anatoliy Kyrylovych Yevdokymenko (Ukrainian: Анато́лій Кири́лович Євдоки́менко; 20 January 1942 – 23 October 2002) was a Ukrainian musician, director of Chervona Ruta. He is a People's Artist of Ukraine, husband of Sofia Rotaru (marriage: 22 September 1968).

Graduated from the Physics and Mathematics department of the Chernivtsi University.

He was producer and scenario writer for most of concert programmes and tours of Sofia Rotaru.

In 2003, the street where he lived in Chernivtsi was named after his name.

== Biography ==
Yevdokymenko was born on 20 January 1942 in the village of Kapitanivka, under Romanian occupation (now Lyman district of Odesa Oblast). He studied at the Chernivtsi secondary school of I-III degrees No. 3. In 1972, he graduated from the Faculty of Physics and Mathematics of Chernivtsi University. In 1982, he graduated from the Kyiv Institute of Culture.

In 1971–1977, he was an artist of the vocal-instrumental ensemble Chervona Ruta of the Chernivtsi Philharmonic.

Since 1971, he was artistic director and director of concert programs of Chervona Ruta. In 1977–2002, he was a soloist of the Crimean Philharmonic (Simferopol) where he performed pop arrangements of Ukrainian folk songs.

He was married to Ukrainian pop-singer and Chervona Ruta most popular singer Sofia Rotaru.

He died in Kyiv on 23 October 2002, and is buried at Baikove Cemetery.
