= Deine Zärtlichkeit =

Single by Sofia Rotaru
- Released: 1978 (Germany)
- Recorded: Ariola / Sony BMG Music Entertainment
- Genre: Pop
- Length: 8:42
- Label: Ariola, Sony BMG Music Entertainment
- Composer(s): Harald Steinhauer
- Lyricist(s): Stevie B, Michael Kunze
- Producer(s): Anthony Monn

Sofia Rotaru singles chronology
"Deine Zärtlichkeit" (1978)	"My Land" (1978)

"Deine Zärtlichkeit" (English: Your Tenderness) is the debut German single of Soviet singer-songwriter Sofia Rotaru, which was released in 1978 by Ariola / Sony BMG Music Entertainment. It does not appear on the planned German debut studio album Sofia Rotaru. The single consists of two songs. Two more songs for the planned studio album with Sony BMG were recorded, but were not released either in this single, or in the planned studio album.

== Song history ==
The single is Sofia Rotaru's very first commercially available single on the Western market.

== Track listing ==
=== Side A ===
#	Title	Music	Lyrics	Production credits	Time
01	"Deine Zärtlichkeit"; English: Your Tenderness	Harald Steinhauer	Stevie B, Michael Kunze	1978	4:18

=== Side B ===
#	Title	Music	Lyrics	Production credits	Time
01	"Nachts, wenn die Nebel ziehen" English: At Night When The Fog Draw	Anthony Monn	Michael Kunze	1978	3:23
