= Chernivtsi Philharmonic Hall =

Philharmonic hall in Chernivtsi, Ukraine

Coordinates: 48.2945°N 25.9344°E

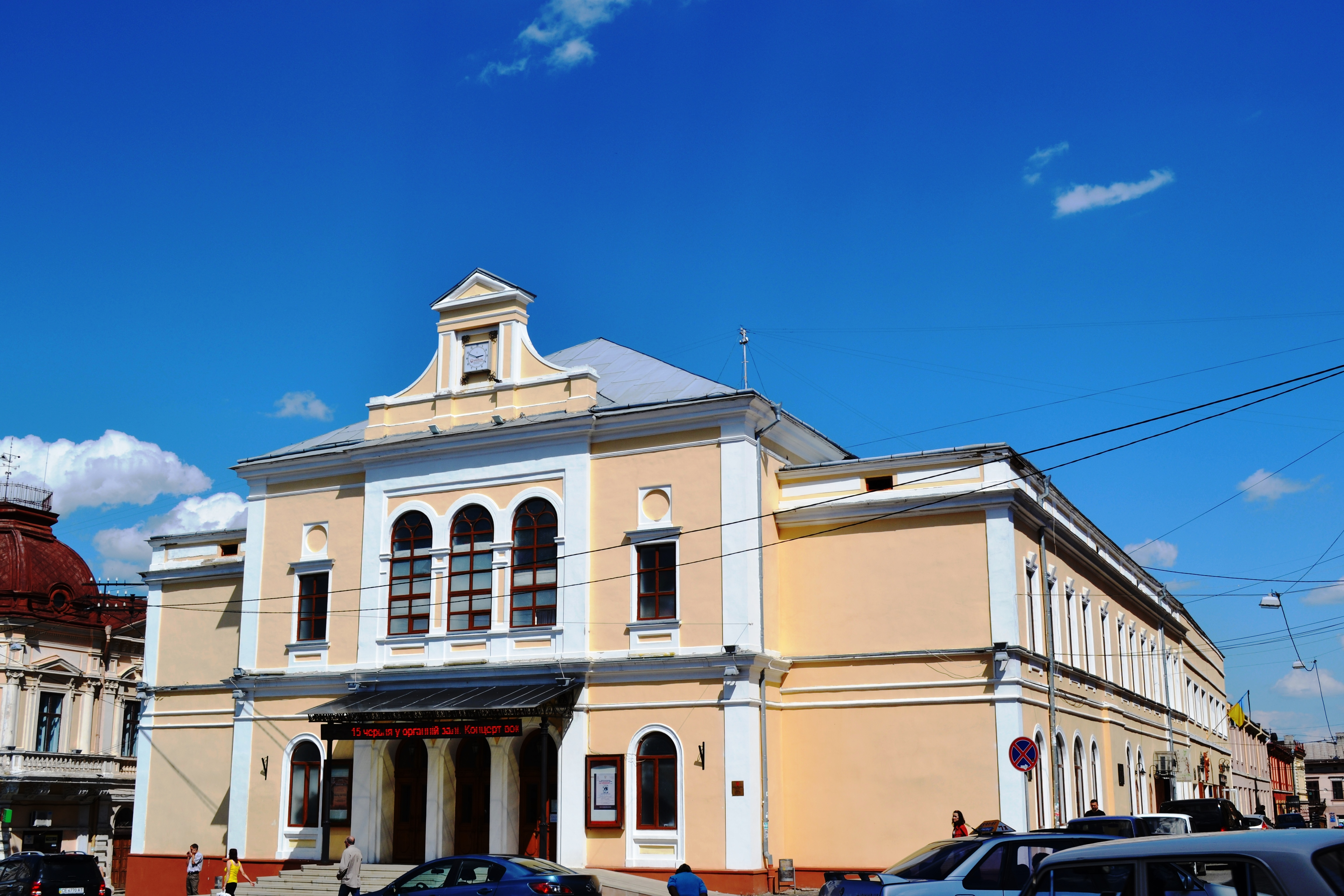
- Chernivtsi Philharmonic Hall
- Interactive map of Chernivtsi Philharmonic Hall

Immovable Monument of Local Significance of Ukraine
- Official name: Зал музичного товариства (Hall of the Music Society)
- Type: Architecture
- Reference no.: 2854-Чв

Chernivtsi Philharmonic Hall, or Chernivtsi Regional Philharmonic (Ukrainian: Чернівецька обласна філармонія), is part of the network of state philharmonic halls in Ukraine located in the central part of Chernivtsi, Ukraine.

== Original hall ==
The current hall was completed in 1876–1877 as a concert hall of the Ukrainian Music Society.

== Recent history ==
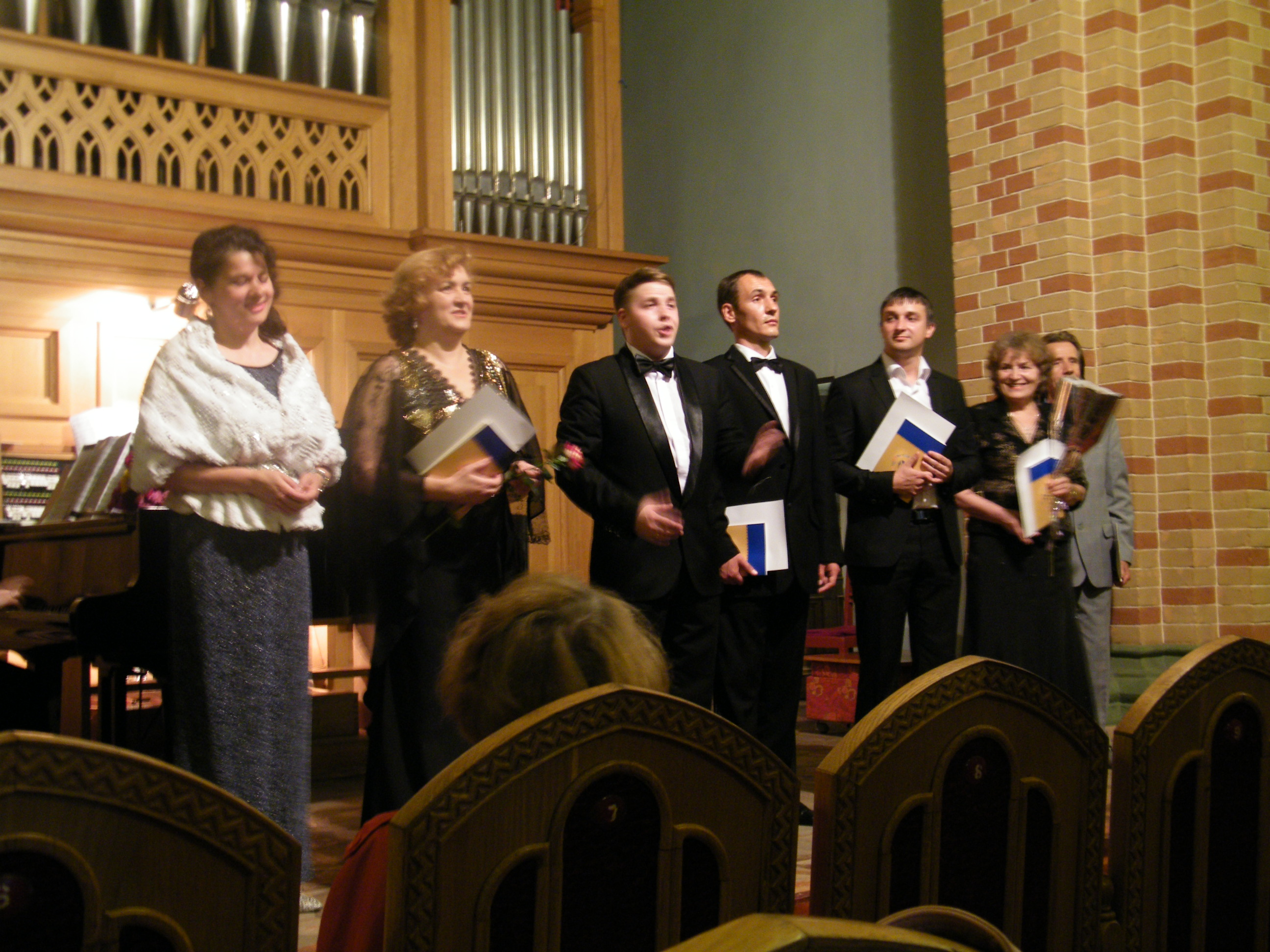
Artists of Chernivtsi Philharmonic after the final concert in 2013

The entity "Chernivtsi Philharmonic Hall" was founded in 1940. Organ and chamber music music hall was opened on 18 August 1992, on the anniversary of the Ukrainian independence.

== Concert programmes ==
The hall is the home, rehearsal and concert venue of musicians and musical bands playing classical but also folk music.

The hall is the venue of music competitions and hosted such musicians as Enrico Caruso, Solomiya Krushelnytska, Feodor Chaliapin, Mykola Lysenko, Sidi Tal.

Today, the hall still hosts a number of music classes.

In 1944, the Bukovina Song and Dance Ensemble of Ukraine was founded. The Chamber Orchestra performs since 1975, and in 1978, it won the Republican competition of chamber music ensembles in Kiev. In 1992 was founded the Chernivtsi Philharmonic Symphony Orchestra, in 1993 - the Chamber Choir. The philharmonic hall became the starting point of such performers as Jan Tabachnik, Sofia Rotaru and Sophia Agranovich.
