= Serdtse ty moe =

Serdtse ty moё

Studio album by Sofia Rotaru
- Released: July 27, 2007 (Germany) not released in Eastern Europe
- Recorded: 2007, FM Records, Germany
- Genre: Pop, Dance
- Length: ???
- Label: FM Records, Germany
- Producer: Sofia Rotaru

Sofia Rotaru chronology
Fog (2007)	Serdtse ty moё (2007)

Serdtse ty moё (Russian: Сердце ты моё) is a studio album recorded by Sofia Rotaru in Germany in 2007. It was released for sale exclusively in Germany. Therefore, songs 1 through 5 (You Are My Heart, What's the Heart's Weather, Do Not Love, One in the World, Blizzard) and 18 (Blizzard) remain officially not released in Eastern Europe. This was a long waited album with new recent hits, namely yet unreleased, although aired in top radio charts, songs in Eastern Europe.

== Track listing ==
#	English title	Original language title	Time
1.	“You Are My Heart” Writer(s): Producer(s):	Russian: Serdtse ty moe/Сердце ты моё	
2.	“What's the Heart's Weather” Writer(s): Producer(s):	Russian: Kakaya na serdtse pogoda/Какая на сердце погода	
3.	“Do Not Love” Writer(s): Producer(s):	Russian: Ne lyubi/Не люби	
4.	“One In the World” Writer(s): Producer(s):	Russian: Odin Na Svete/Один на свете	
5.	“Blizzard” Writer(s): Producer(s):	Russian: Viyuga/Вьюга	
6.	“I Loved Him” Writer(s): Valery Meladze; Producer(s): Sofia Rotaru	Russian: Ya zhe Ego Lyubila/Я же его любила	
7.	“On the Shore of Our First Love” Writer(s): Producer(s):	Russian: Na Beregu Nashei Pervoi Lyubvi/На берегу нашей первой любви	
8.	“White Dance” Writer(s): Producer(s):	Russian: Belyi Tanets/Белый танец	
9.	“Septembered” Writer(s): Producer(s):	Russian: Zasentyabrilo/Засентябрило	
10.	“Taste of Love” Writer(s): Producer(s):	Russian: Vkus Lyubvi/Вкус любви	
11.	“Night Moth” Writer(s): Producer(s):	Russian: Nochnoy Motylyok/Ночной мотылёк	
12.	“Small Town Girl” Writer(s): Producer(s):	Russian: Khutoryanka/Хуторянка	
13.	“Lavender” Writer(s): Producer(s):	Russian: Lavanda/Лаванда	
14.	“Moon” Writer(s): Producer(s):	Russian: Luna/Луна	
15.	“I Still Love You” Writer(s): Producer(s):	Russian: Ya Tebya Po-Prezhnemu Lyublyu/Я тебя по-прежнему люблю	
16.	“It Was, But It Is Gone” Writer(s): Producer(s):	Russian: Bylo, No Proshlo/Было, но прошло	
17.	“Caravan of Love” Writer(s): Producer(s):	Russian: Karavan Lyubvi/Караван любви	
18.	“Autumn Flowers” Writer(s): Producer(s):	Russian: Osennie Tsvety/Осенние цветы	
19.	“Wild Swans” Writer(s): Producer(s):	Russian: Dikie Lebedi/Дикие лебеди	

== Languages of performance ==
All songs are performed in Russian language.

== Production and technical details ==
- Album's description on the German site

== See also ==
- You Are My Heart - song
