= Ukrtelefilm =

Ukrainian film studio

- Type: State-owned
- Industry: Motion pictures
- Founded: 1965
- Headquarters: Kyiv, Ukraine
- Key people: Taras Avrakhov (since 2018)
- Products: Motion pictures
- Services: Film production; Film distribution; Television production; Television distribution; Animation
- Owner: Government of Ukraine
- Parent: Suspilne (NPBC of Ukraine)

The Public JSC Ukrainian Television Film Studio, better known by its abbreviated name Ukrtelefilm, is a Ukrainian film studio founded in 1965. In 1959, the Council of Ministers of the Ukrainian SSR allocated a 4-hectare plot of land on the banks of the Rusanivsky Canal for the construction of a film complex with a car garage, a two-story administrative building with a film pavilion, a tonal studio, a large film screening room and a small (director's) film screening room, a film equipment shop, a sound shop, and a combined filming shop. The film complex included a state-of-the-art film development shop and a film negative and positive editing facility. A large apple orchard was also laid out on the territory of Ukrtelefilm studio.

In 1983, the USSR State Committee for Television and Radio built a new video complex with two large pavilions with stationary TV cameras and video recording and editing equipment, makeup and prop shops. The video complex housed the TJC department (a television journalism complex with a portable video camera).

According to the amendments to the Law of Ukraine "On Public Broadcasting" of May 2016, Ukrtelefilm is to be transformed into Ukrtelefilm PJSC and join UA:PBC (National Public Broadcasting Company of Ukraine). The transformation is to be carried out by the state enterprise manager, the State Committee for Television and Radio of Ukraine, starting in May 2016.

== History ==
Ukrtelefilm Film Studio was founded in 1965. It is managed by the State Committee for Television and Radio Broadcasting of Ukraine. It is a self-supporting state enterprise with budgetary financing through state orders for film and video production. In 1959, the Council of Ministers of the Ukrainian SSR allocated a land plot for the construction of a film production complex.

The State Committee on Television and Radio Broadcasting is responsible for controlling the preservation of state property at enterprises under the control of the State Committee. There should also have been a ban on the alienation of state property. The alienation of state property in Ukraine is regulated by the Resolution of the Cabinet of Ministers of Ukraine of 6 June 2007, 803 "On Approval of the Procedure for Alienation of State Property Objects".

Over the years since 1965, Ukrtelefilm has created many feature films and so-called "newsreels", which fully documented world-class writers, composers, musicians, and vocalists performing both their own works and masterpieces of Ukrainian and world classics on camera.

In 2009, the entire archive of the studio was transferred to digital media. However, the studio's leaders hide this fact to constantly write off money for "digitization", so it is not known exactly how many video works the studio has created during its existence. According to the studio's managers, Ukrtelefilm has created almost 3000 titles of video products in various genres in Ukrainian and Russian.

In August 2019, the State Property Fund sold the unified property complex of Ukrtelefilm for UAH 5 million[clarify], which many media outlets mistakenly reported as the sale of the unified property complex of State Enterprise "Ukrtelefilm" (a different structure from Ukrtelefilm).
