= Melancolie =

Song by Sofia Rotaru
- Language: Romanian
- English title: Melancholia
- Recorded: 1983
- Genre: Pop music
- Label: Melodiya
- Songwriter: Grigore Vieru

Melancolie (English: Melancholia) is a Moldovan Soviet song written in Romanian by Petre Teodorovici (music) and Grigore Vieru (lyrics). The well known song was performed by various singers such as Sofia Rotaru, Angela Similea, Ion Suruceanu, and others. Both Rotaru and Suruceanu appeared in the Soviet film Dnestrovskiye melodiy of the 1970s.

A megahit in the Soviet Union in 1983.

== History ==
Composer Pyotr Teodorovich first sold it to singer Nadezhda Chepraga for 150 Soviet rubles (an engineer's salary in the USSR).

And then, as it turns out, to Sofia Rotaru for 250 rubles (a large sum at the time). Why the composer did this is unknown, but each singer began to consider the song their own and performed it in concert.

== Lyrics ==
in Romanian
Eu mă întreb de unde vine, vine,
De unde doru-şi ia izvorul, dorul
Mă luminez şi-mi pare bine, bine
Când vine dorul, când dorul vine.

Chorus:
Melancolie — dulce melodie,
Melancolie — misterios amor.
Melancolie, melancolie
Din armonia inimii cu dor.

Mai drag de-amorul meu târziu, mai dragă,
Mai dragă mi-e mândruţa dragă, dragă,
Mai drag mi-e codrul cu izvorul, dorul,
Când vine dorul, când dorul vine.

Chorus:
Melancolie – dulce melodie,
Melancolie – misterios amor.
Malancolie, melancolie
Din armonia inimii cu dor.
Note:

- ş reads sh as in shower
- â reads i as in sin, win, kin, pin etc.
- c in front of e reads as ch as in reach

Translation
Who will explain me the miracle, miracle
When love around the world travels, travels
And suddenly from unknown where the miracle
Has come to you, to you has come

Chorus:
Melancholia — a sweet melodies
Melancholia — non-ordinary feelings
Melancholia, melancholia
Out of the harmony of a loving heart

For me it so easy when you near, right next
The heart's pounding as in a bird, bird
The soul's glad for the whole world
And childhood's recalling

Chorus:

Now to me all people became close, close
By your magical simple power, power
When, my darling, I see, see
I song from happiness

== Literature ==
- Elizaveta Kvilinkova. Moldovans in Belarus: Ethnocultural Identity and Integration (2024) ISBN 9785046644005
