= Sofia Rotaru =

Ukrainian singer (born 1947)

Hero of Ukraine Sofia Rotaru OS
- Софія Ротару
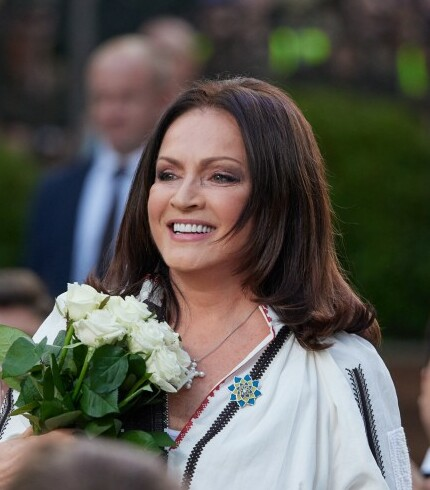
- Rotaru in 2021
- Born: Sofiia Mykhailivna Rotaru; 7 August 1947 (age 79); Marshyntsi, Ukrainian SSR, Soviet Union
- Occupations: Singer; film producer; dancer; actress
- Years active: 1968–2021
- Spouse: Anatoliy Yevdokymenko (m. 1968; died 2002)
- Musical career
- Genres: Pop; folk; dance; rock; pop-folk
- Formerly of: Chervona Ruta
- Website: www.sofiarotaru.com

Signature
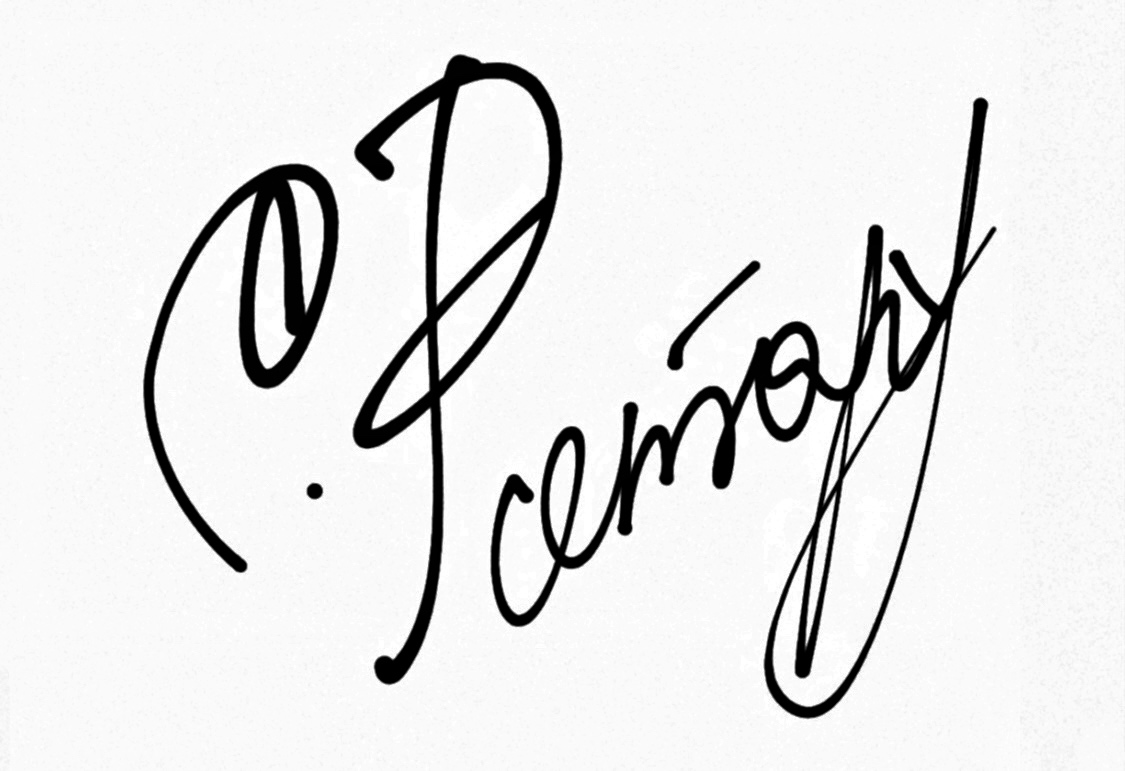

Sofiia Mykhailivna Yevdokymenko-Rotaru (Ukrainian: Софія Михайлівна Євдокименко-Ротару [soˈfijɐ roˈtɑrʊ]; Russian: София Михайловна Евдокименко-Ротару; née Rotaru; born 7 August 1947), known simply as Sofia Rotaru, is a Ukrainian singer.

In 1972, she released the multilingual album Sofia Rotaru, re-released three times and covered by numerous singers, establishing herself as a viable pop artist in the countries of the former Soviet Union. She first gained international recognition after participating in 1968 in the International Youth Song Festival in Bulgaria and winning first prize at the Golden Orpheus in 1973 and second prize in the category of Polish songs at the Sopot International Song Festival in 1974. In the former USSR her career was marked by her stage success and numerous controversies.

Rotaru has been performing for more than 40 years, and topped the Moscow airplay with "Ya nazovu planetu imenem tvoim" in 2008.

She reported the highest income of all celebrities in Ukraine in 2008 and 2010.

Her repertoire consists of more than 40 albums and 400 songs recorded in many languages. She has received awards, deemed a Merited Artist of the Ukrainian SSR, People's Artist of Ukraine, People's Artist of Moldavian SSR, Laureate of the Lenin Komsomol Prize, Hero of Moldova, and Cavalier of the Republican Order of Moldova. In August 2002, former president of Ukraine Leonid Kuchma and President of Russia Vladimir Putin gave awards to Sofia Rotaru for her 55th birthday, bestowing upon her the high rank of the Hero of Ukraine for her "outstanding personal merits in the sphere of art", and the Russian order "For Merit to the Fatherland", respectively. She has been acknowledged by the Ukrainian Orthodox Church of the Moscow Patriarchate.

Rotaru's official surname is Yevdokymenko-Rotaru. Yevdokymenko was the surname of her late husband. Yalta is her main residence, although she also has homes in Moscow, Kyiv, and Baden-Baden.

== Early life ==
Sofia Rotaru, who comes from the Romanian minority in Ukraine, was born in Marshyntsi (Marșenița), Chernivtsi Oblast to the family of Mikhail Rotaru (Rotar), a brigadier of wine-growers. Marshyntsi is a village of Novoselytskyi Raion (Noua Suliță), close to the border with Moldova, and the majority of its population is Romanophone (Romanian-speaking). The area was part of Kingdom of Romania before 1940, when Soviet Union occupied and annexed it after an ultimatum.

She was the second child in a family of six children. Her siblings are Zina, Lidia, Aurica, Eugen and Anatol. A passport office employee misreported her birthdate on her passport as 9 August; as a result, Rotaru reportedly celebrates her birthday twice.

Her father, Mykhail Fedorovich Rotaru, (Note: Her father's name was spelled Ротарь (transliterated Rotar or Rotari), in the Slavicized tradition of Moldavian surnames; and Sofia's surname was spelled thusly in her birth certificate.) spent World War II as a heavy machine gunner and traveled to Berlin. Injured, he returned home only in 1946, and was the first person to join the Communist Party in the village. Her older sister, Zinaida ("Zina"), was born on 11 October 1942. Zina endured severe childhood illness and went blind, but possessed perfect pitch and easily memorized new songs, so she taught Sofia folk songs. Sofia said of her elder sister: "We all learned from her – what a musical memory, what a soul!". Zina spent hours listening to the radio and learned numerous songs, as well as the Russian language, which she later taught to her brothers and sisters. At home, the Rotaru family spoke only Romanian. As a child, Sofia participated in regional competitions of pentathlon and running.

She started singing from the first grade in the school choir, as well as in the church choir. However, the latter was not acceptable to the school officials. Hence, she was threatened with an exclusion from the Young Pioneer organization. Rotaru was attracted by the theatre. She practiced in drama classes and sang popular folk songs in vocal classes. In the evenings, she used to take the only bayan at school and hide in the barn trying to find the proper melodies for her most loved Moldavian songs. Rotaru said:

"It is difficult to say, when and how did the music appear in my life. It seems that it has always lived in me. I grew up among music, it was playing everywhere: at a wedding table, at klatches, at girls' winter evening gatherings, on the dance floor..."

== Career ==
=== 1962–1968: Career start and pop-folk ===
Rotaru's victory at a vocal competition of amateur performers opened the door to a regional review in 1962. In 1963 in Chernivtsi, she earned a first degree diploma at the regional amateur art review. In 1964, she won the all-republic festival of popular talents in Kyiv. On this occasion her picture made it on the cover of No. 27 of the magazine Ukraine in 1965. After graduation from high school, Rotaru decided to become a singer and entered the vocal and conductor department of the Chernivtsi musical college. In addition, she took lessons at Chernivtsi Philharmonic from the famed singer and actress Sidi Tal. In 1964, Rotaru performed at the State Kremlin Palace.

In 1966, while being a student, she was the subject of the short Soviet musical documentary film Solovey iz sela Marshyntsi (Russian: Соловей из села Маршинцы, lit. 'Nightingale from the village of Marshyntsi'), in which she performed 3 Moldavian folk songs and one Russian pop song.

=== 1968–1973: International recognition ===
In 1968, after graduation from college, Rotaru performed as a delegate of the IX World Festival of Youth and Students in the capital of Bulgaria, as a member of an artistic group. She won First Prize in the competition of singers of folk popular songs. Bulgarian newspapers were full of headlines: "21-year old Sofia has conquered Sofia". Her performances of the Ukrainian folk pop song "Na kameni stoyu" (Standing on the Stone), Moldavian folk pop songs and "Valentina" by Gheorghite made headlines. The latter song was dedicated to the first female cosmonaut Valentina Tereshkova, who was present in the concert hall. In 1968, Rotaru married Anatoliy Yevdokymenko, who at that time was a student at Chernivtsi University and a trumpet player in a student pop band.

In 1971, producer Roman Alekseev shot a musical film Chervona Ruta for Ukrtelefilm. The plot was about the tender and pure love of a girl from the mountains (played by Rotaru) and her relationship with a man from the industrial city of Donetsk. The name of the film means rue, a flower derived from an ancient Carpathian legend. Rue blossoms only on Ivan Kupala Night and the girl who succeeds in finding a blooming rue will be happy in love. Songs of the composer Volodymyr Ivasyuk and other writers were co-performed by Zinkevich, Yaremchuk and other singers. The film enjoyed significant success. After the film was released, Rotaru received an offer to work in the Chernivtsi Philharmonic Society and with a backing ensemble called Chervona Ruta. Anatoliy Yevdokymenko, Rotaru's husband, became the artistic director of the ensemble.

As a result of collaborating with Volodymyr Ivasyuk, a cycle of songs was written based on the roots revival material in an orchestration characteristic of the 1960s and the 1970s in Continental Europe. Resulting works brought Rotaru great popularity in the Soviet Union, especially in Ukraine. This was largely due to the fact that the Soviet authorities eagerly promoted her art as an example of international Soviet culture, as she was an ethnic Moldavian/Romanian singing in Moldavian/Romanian, Ukrainian and Russian languages. Consequently, Rotaru gained regular airplay on state radio and television and was systematically billed for state-organized concerts.

In 1972, Rotaru and Chervona Ruta participated in a tour in Poland with the programme Pesni i tantsy Strany Sovetov (Songs and Dances of the Country of Soviets).

In the same year Sofia Rotaru collaborated with Don Backy, performing the Ukrainian version of his hit from the 60s L'immensità - "Syzokrylyi ptakh".

In 1973, she received First Prize at the international contest of Golden Orpheus in Burgas, Bulgaria, performing the song "Moy gorod" ("My city") and Second Prize in the category of foreign performance of a song in the Bulgarian language. In 1973, she also was awarded the Meritorious Artist of the Ukrainian SSR. Later, the songs which she performed in the Moldavian/Romanian language, "Codru" and "Moy gorod", became soundtracks for the film Vesenniye sozvuchiya – 73.

=== 1974–1979: New authors and Moldavian lyricism ===
In 1974, Rotaru graduated from the Chişinău Art Institute of Gavriil Musicescu in the choral conducting class with professor Lydia Axionova and participated in the Sopot International Song Festival in Poland, performing "Vospominaniye" (Remembrance) by B. Rychkov, and "Vodohrai" by Ivasjuk. She received second prize in the category of Polish song for her performance of "Ktoś" ("Someone"). In 1976, she moved from Chernivtsi to Yalta, transferring from the Chernivtsi Philharmonic Society to the Crimean Philharmonic Society. After the death of Volodymyr Ivasyuk in 1979, a number of songs by Moldavian composers appeared in her repertoire penned by the Teodorovici brothers. By that time, Rotaru had ceased collaboration with Moldavian authors, primarily Eugen Doga.

Rotaru's songs of the period were created in collaboration with the following composers and lyricists: Arno Babajanian wrote "Verni mne muzyku" (Bring Me the Music Back); Aleksey Mazhukov – "A muzyka zvuchit" (But the Music Plays) and "Krasnaya strela" (Red Arrow); Pavel Aedonitskiy – "Dlya tekh, kto zhdyot" (For Those Who Wait); Oscar Feltsman - "Only For You"; David Tukhmanov – "Aist na kryshe" (Stork on the Roof), "V dome moyom" (At My Home), and "Val's" (Waltz); Yury Saulsky – "A Usual Story" and "Osennyaya melodiya" (Autumn Melody); Aleksandra Pakhmutova – "Temp" (Tempo); Raimonds Pauls – "Tanets na barabane" (Dance on the Drum); Aleksandr Zatsepin – "Sovsem kak na Zemle" (Just like on Earth); Vladimir Migulya – "Zhyzn'" (Life), and others.

She was the first performer of Eugene Martyunov's songs, including "Lebedinaya vernost" ("Swan Fidelity"), "Yabloni v tsvetu" ("Blossoming Apples"), and "Ballada o materi" ("Ballad About Mother"). A patriotic song, "Shchastye tebe, Zemlya moya" ("Be Happy, My Earth"), caused some political controversy.

=== 1980–1983: Acting career and new connections ===
In 1980, at the international song festival held in Tokyo, Rotaru won first prize for her performance of Ljupka Dimitrovska's song "Obeshchaniye" / "Obećanje" (Promise) and received the Order of the Badge of Honor. She continued to experiment and was the first Soviet female singer to appear wearing trousers on stage. While doing this, she performed a hip-hop style song "Temp" (Tempo) with music composed by Aleksandra Pakhmutova and lyrics written by Nikolay Dobronravov. The songs "Temp" and "Ozhidaniye" (Waiting) were specially written for the cultural programme of the 1980 Summer Olympics in Moscow. The song was used as the soundtrack theme for the drama film Ballada o sporte (Ode to sports), produced by Yuri Ozerov. In the same year, for her performance of "Ozhidaniye", Rotaru won the All-Union Song of the Year award.

In 1980, Rotaru starred in the leading role in a film released by Moldova-Film and called Gde ty, lyubov'? (Where are you, love?). Among other songs in the film, Rotaru performed "Pervy dozhd'" (First Rain). The movie featured her riding a motorcycle on a narrow sea embankment without a stunt double. According to the autobiographic plot, a village teacher is invited to join an ensemble and wins the Grand Prix at an international festival with the song "Gde ty, lyubov'?". The music for the song was composed by Raimonds Pauls and lyrics by Ilya Reznik. A double album of the soundtrack was released. More than 25 million movie goers viewed the film in 1980. The title song of the film was banned from state radio by Gennadiy Cherkassov, director of the music department.

In 1981, at the XIVth All-Union Cinema Festival in Vilnius, the film received the jury's prize for popularisation of the singing art of Soviet composers, in the section of drama films. This movie was the first public exposure for Rotaru in a dramatic role. Critics lambasted the film but it garnered support from audiences and some of its themes became popular. Rotaru's next artistic period began with a new style – rock music. The film Dusha (Soul) with Rotaru's new rock band Mashina Vremeni was released in 1981, including songs by Aleksandr Zatsepin and Andrey Makarevich. As she was ill, her doctors recommended she not participate in the movie production and that she cancel all concert performances.

This incident caused Alexander Borodyansky and Alexander Stefanovich to write an autobiographical scenario for the film using the dramatic situation in the singer's life, characterising her loss of voice with an opening of her soul. This was shown in dialogue on a pier with an older man and included a reevaluation of her values. After having seen the new rewritten scenario and new songs, written in a completely new style, Rotaru agreed to star in the movie and decided to temporarily forego all concert performances. In 1983, Rotaru performed a national concert tour of Canada, organised by the National Concert Agency Inc. The concerts were supported by the issue of an LP, titled Canadian Tour 1983 and released by Cansov Exchange Inc.

=== 1985–1989: Change of style – Europop and hard rock ===
The mid-1980s evolved into a turning point in the creation of the singer's image. Contrary to the previous Vas priglashaet Sofia Rotaru (Sofia Rotaru Invites You) (1985), the new film Monologue of Love (1986) explored the aesthetics of the new art. Only one song, "Techët voda" (Water Flows) by Ihor Poklad, carried on the folk music theme, presenting an image of a farm girl who became a star.

A new collaboration began in 1985 with the song "Lavanda" (Lavender), written by Vladimir Matetskiy for a duet with Estonian Jaak Joala. In 1986, she reversed artistic direction with the relatively unknown Moscow songwriter. He managed the transition of Rotaru to a Europop style ("Bylo no proshlo" (Once It Was But Now It's Over), "Luna" (Moon)), including elements of hard rock "Moya vremya" (My Time), "Tol'ko etogo malo" (That's Not Enough). During the next 15 years, Matetskiy and his co-author, Mikhail Shabrov, collaborated heavily with Rotaru. They produced songs, most of which became part of her concert programmes in 1990–2000.

=== 1990–1991: Among different cultures ===
The transition to a repertoire in the Russian language caused a certain amount of animosity in Ukraine. Accusations in betrayal of national culture were supported by the state producer unions, philharmonic societies, and concert companies who were losing control over the financial side of the concert and tour activity of Rotaru as a result of economic reforms.

To avoid large scale provocations, she refused to participate in the Chervona Ruta festival which took place in Chernivtsi in 1989. The diminution of proportion of Ukrainian songs was caused by the absence of high-quality lyrics in Ukrainian. Rare exceptions included the songs of Mykola Mozghovyi, "Krai, myi ridnyi krai" (Homeland), "Minaie den'" (Day Passes); Blizniuk, "Vidlunnia virnosti" (Echo of Fidelity); Rybchinskyi, "Bal razluchennykh serdets" (Ball of Separate Hearts); and Kvinta, "Chekai" (Wait), "Odna kalyna" (Lone Guelder-Rose), "Tuman" (Fog).

In 1991, during a concert in Lviv, some people from the audience put up a poster in Ukrainian, translating into: "Sofia, a heavy penalty is waiting for you". Due to the incident, Rotaru did not perform in Ukraine until the end of the 1990s, after a personal request by the president of Ukraine Leonid Kuchma. At the same time, Rotaru prepared a new concert program, presented to the public in 1991.

=== 1991–2004: New times ===
After the collapse of the USSR and commercialisation of post-Soviet music, Rotaru has kept her top position in the market and has a stable public, including the Russian speaking diaspora in Europe, USA, Australia and Israel. In 2000 Rotaru was named the Best Ukrainian Pop Singer of the Twentieth Century. In 2001 Rotaru performed in a new solo concert program Zhyzn' moya – moya lyubov' (My Life Is My Love). The programme blended new songs with the hits of the previous years in a new manner. In 2002 Sofia Rotaru was awarded the title "Hero of Ukraine".

After the death of her husband in 2002, and the loss of her parents, Rotaru stopped touring for a period and joined a nunnery. Following several months of mourning, Rotaru resumed her concert and recording activities and topped the Russian, Ukrainian and Moldavian charts again.

A new period started in 2003 with performances in the Koncertny Zal "Rossiya" of Moscow, dedicated to the opening of her statue in front of the hall. Composers working with Rotaru included Ruslan Kvinta ("Odna kalyna"), Oleg Makarevič ("Bely tanets") and Konstantin Meladze ("Ya zhe yego lyubila" and "Odin na svete"), as well as lyricist Vitalij Kurovskij. She released the following albums: Yedynomu (For the Only One, 2003; with new songs and arrangements in Ukrainian and Moldavian/Romanian languages), dedicated to the memory of her late husband ("Nebo – eto ya" ("Heaven – It's Me", 2004), and "Ya zhe yego lyubila" ("Didn't I Love Him", 2005).

=== 2007–2016: 60th birthday ===
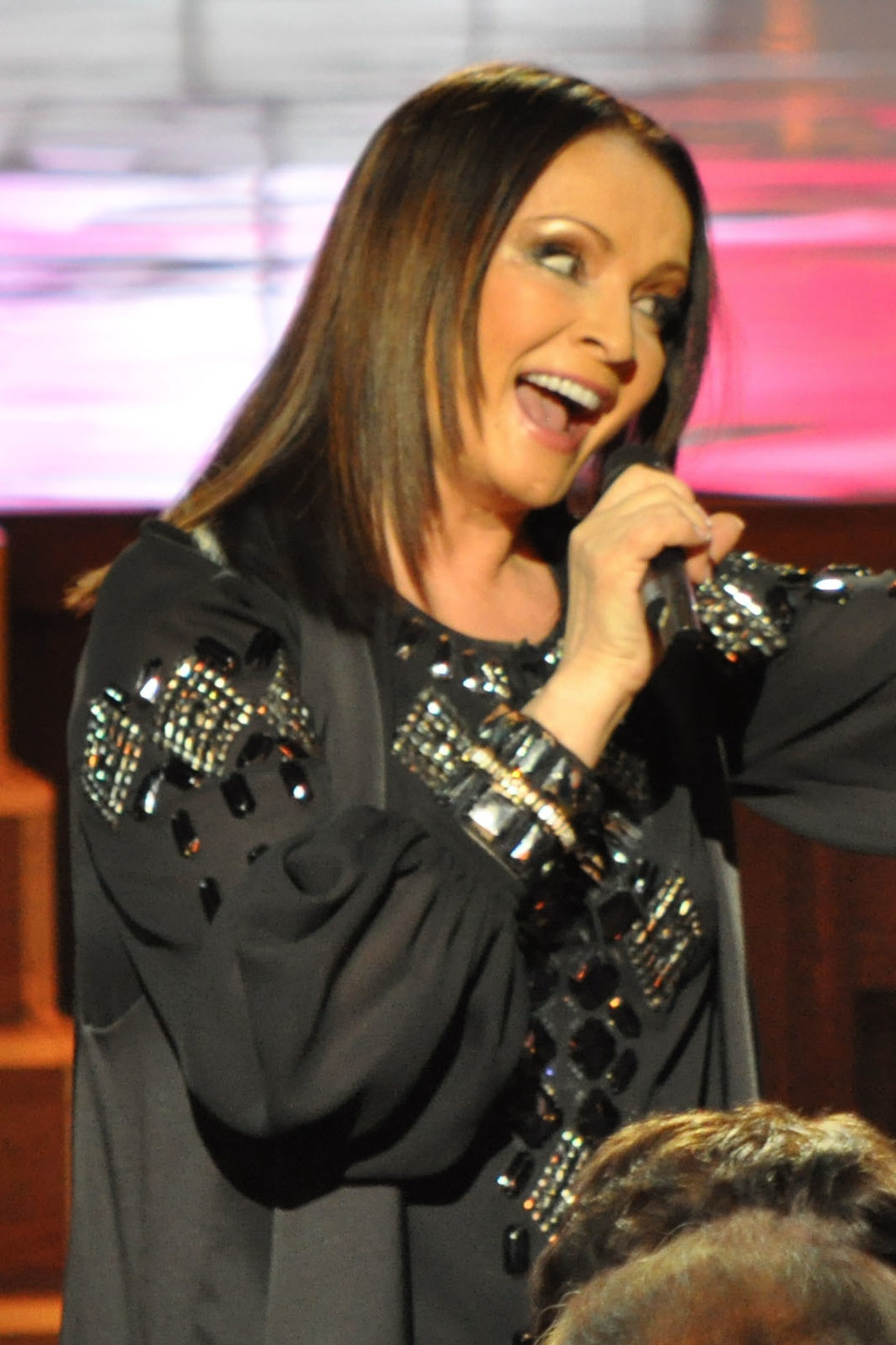
Rotaru in 2011

In 2007, she celebrated her 60th birthday. Hundreds of fans, as well as artists and politicians, came to Yalta to congratulate the singer. The President of Ukraine awarded Sofia Rotaru with the II Degree Order for Merits. Her official reception and birthday party took place at the Livadia Palace in Yalta, in the presence of the president of Russia, the president of Ukraine and the president of Moldova. The event was covered live by Ukrainian and Russian state TV channels. Celebrations for her birthday continued into September in Sochi, where one of the young performers' music festival days, called "Five Stars", was dedicated to Rotaru. In October 2007, more birthday concerts took place in Moscow, at the State Grand Kremlin Palace, featuring Russian singers performing her songs. 2006 and 2007 were busy for Rotaru. Three albums were released: Tuman (Fog) in Eastern Europe, and two albums exclusively for the German market, Serdtse ty moë (You Are My Heart) and Kakaya na serdtse pogoda (What's the Weather Like in the Heart). The year included participation in numerous TV shows and concert programmes and a documentary made for Ukrainian TV. A Russian Anniversary Tour lasted from March until June 2007. Another TV musical show, Krasota Trebuet (Beauty Requires), with Rotaru singing the song "Lavanda" ("Lavender"), premiered on 8 March 2008.

=== 2017–present ===
In 2022, she condemned the Russian Invasion of Ukraine.

== Politics ==
"Rodina" (Motherland) (original version)
"Rodina", a controversial song by Rotaru

Rotaru does not support any particular political ideology. Nevertheless, her multicultural identity has both helped and harmed her. Soviet authorities, persecuting her family for celebrating Christmas, simultaneously lauded her as the top singer of the USSR. The German press wrote about her as "The Nana Mouskouri of the Soviet Union". Some of her albums were recorded in Germany. After recording "L'immensità" (Immensity) in Italian, and "Wer Liebe sucht" (Who's Looking for Love) ("Deine Zärtlichkeit" (Your Tenderness), "Es muss nicht sein" (It Need not Be), and "Nachts, wenn die Nebel ziehen" (At Night When the Fog Spreads) in German, Ariola proposed releasing a larger studio album with these and other songs in French and English, and launching a concert tour in Western Europe.

However, a directive came from the Soviet government (Goskontsert) to sing only Soviet songs. Thus, only the initial single was released "Deine Zärtlichkeit". The concert administration of the USSR prohibited her from leaving the USSR between 1983 and 1988. This interdiction was put in effect after the 1983 tour in Canada and the release of her Canadian Tour 1983 album.

During the Orange Revolution in Ukraine, Rotaru, together with her family, sent food packages to people who came to the Maidan Nezalezhnosti, regardless of their political affiliation. In 2006 Rotaru took active part in parliamentary elections in Ukraine, balloting for the deputy chair as a second number in the list of Volodymyr Lytvyn's political formation Lytvyn Bloc; however, the bloc could not gather enough votes to enter Parliament, one of the major surprises of the elections. She held an all-Ukrainian charitable campaign tour the same year. Rotaru cited her personal trust of Lytvyn and his steadiness, as well as her own interest in lobbying for arts issues in Ukraine. As a Crimean resident, she refused Russian citizenship following Russia's annexation of the peninsula.

== Personal life ==
Aurica, Sofia's younger sister, has also performed professionally, combining a solo career with performances as a back-up vocalist, as well as dueting with sister Lidia and brother Eugene. In 1992, Aurica ended her singing career. Sofia's husband, Anatoliy Kyrylovich Yevdokymenko (1941–2002), was a People's Artist of Ukraine. He was the son of a conductor from Chernivtsi. He first saw Rotaru on the cover of the magazine Ukraine No. 27 in 1965 and immediately fell in love with her. At the time, Yevdokymenko was a serving his military duty in Nizhny Tagil, Ural region. After military service, he looked Rotaru up. Yevdokymenko had graduated from a musical high school, played the trumpet, and planned to create his own band. As a student at the University of Chernivtsi and a trumpeter in the student pop orchestra, he helped Rotaru discover the pop orchestra.

I rather owe my coming into being as a singer and, probably, my personality, to those women with whom I worked in the village. It is really from them that I learned to understand the meaning of life. I received help – simple and magnanimous – from them in difficult times.

Singing in different languages caused fierce arguments about which culture Rotaru identifies with: Moldavian/Romanian, Ukrainian, or Russian.

== Discography ==
- 1972 Chervona Ruta
- 1973 Poet Sofia Rotaru
- 1974 Sofia Rotaru (aka Ballada o skripkakh)
- 1976 Sofia Rotaru (aka Lebedinaya vernost)
- 1977 Sofia Rotaru poet pesni Vladimira Ivasyuka
- 1978 Sofia Rotaru (aka Rodina moya)
- 1979 Tolko tebe
- 1981 Where Has Love Gone?
- 1981 Sofia Rotaru and Chervona Ruta
- 1985 Tender Melody
- 1987 Monologue of Love
- 1987 Lavanda
- 1988 Heart of Gold
- 1991 Caravan of Love
- 1995 Khutoryanka
- 1998 Lyubi menya
- 2002 Ya tebya po-prezhnemu lyublyu
- 2004 Nebo – eto ya
- 2005 Ya zhe yego lyubila
- 2008 Ya – tvoya lybov'!
- 2010 Ya ne oglyanus

== Awards ==
Rotaru is a Meritorious Citizen of Crimea and Yalta. She has received numerous awards, including Meritorious Artist of the Ukrainian SSR, People's Artist of Ukraine, People's Artist of Moldavian SSR, People's Artist of USSR, Laureate of the YCL Prize, Hero of Moldova, and Cavalier of the Republican Order of Moldova. In August 2002, President of Ukraine Leonid Kuchma and President of Russia Vladimir Putin honoured Rotaru on her 55th birthday, bestowing upon her the high rank of Hero of Ukraine for her "outstanding personal merits in the sphere of art", and the Russian order, "For merits before the Nation".

She is an Honorary Citizen of Chișinău, Moldova

Awards
Slavianski Bazaar
Preceded by 2006 Alla Pugacheva	Through Art - to Peace and Understanding; 2007; Sofia Rotaru	Succeeded by 2008 Aleksandra Pakhmutova
Golden Orpheus
Preceded by 1972 Zdzisława Sośnicka	First Prize; 1973; Sofia Rotaru	Succeeded by 1974 Sergei Zakharov/Nereida Naranjo
Muz-TV Music Awards
Preceded by 2003 Valery Leontiev	Contribution to pop music development 2004; Sofia Rotaru	Succeeded by 2005 Oleg Gazmanov

== See also ==
- Russian pop music
- Pop music in Ukraine
- Melancolie, Moldavian/Romanian song
