= Third Force =

Third Force may refer to:

== Politics ==
- Third party (politics), party other than one of the two dominant ones in a two-party political system
  - Third party (United States), in American politics
  - Third parties in a two-party system, in which two political parties dominate voting in nearly all elections at every level of government
  - Chinese Peasants' and Workers' Democratic Party, called "Third party" in the 1930s
- Third Force, a term referring to Canadians of neither British or French descent; see Multiculturalism in Canada § Incipient stage (pre-1971)
- Third Force (China), attempts to establish another force against the authoritarian Kuomintang and the radical Chinese Communist Party during the Republic of China (1912–1949) era, and also attempts to establish an alternative to the Chinese-Communist-Party-lead People's Republic of China as well as the Kuomintang-lead Republic of China after the establishment of PRC and expulsion of KMT from mainland China in 1949
- Third Force (CIA), a CIA program instituted during the Korean War to destabilise China. Perhaps best known for the John T. Downey and Richard Fecteau shootdown. Also known as Operation Tropic.
- Third Force (France), a French political coalition during the Fourth Republic
- Third Force (Hong Kong), a political party in Hong Kong, supportive of China
- Third Force (Iran), a socialist–nationalist political movement in Iran during Abadan Crisis
- Third Force (Northern Ireland), a former Northern Irish paramilitary organisation
- Third Force (Myanmar), the informal name given to a collection of new political parties in Myanmar which contested the 2010 Burmese elections
- Third force (1996 Russian presidential election), an electoral coalition proposed during the 1996 Russian presidential election
- Third Force (South Africa), a late apartheid-era militants, resistant to change
- Third Force (Ukraine), a Ukrainian political party
- Third Force (Georgia), a defunct Georgian political coalition

== Music ==
- 3rd Force, a smooth jazz band
- Third Force, a 1991 Jazz CD by American composer and saxophonist/multi-instrumentalist Thomas Chapin
