= Stanislav Zhyrkov =

Ukrainian theatre director (born 1986)

- Жирков Станіслав Ігорович; Stas Zhyrkov
- Born: 10 September 1986 (age 39); Ufa, Bashkortostan, Soviet Union
- Occupations: Theatre director, musical director, lighting designer, scenographer, stage manager, artistic director
- Years active: 2008–present
- Known for: Director of Kyiv Left Bank Theatre (2019–2022)
- Awards: Honored Artist of Ukraine (2017); Kyiv Pectoral Theatre Award (multiple)

Stanislav Ihorovych Zhyrkov (Жирков Станіслав Ігорович; born 10 September 1986), known professionally as Stas Zhyrkov, is a Ukrainian theatre director, musical director, lighting designer, scenographer, stage manager, and artistic director.

Zhyrkov served as director and artistic director of the Kyiv Academic Theatre of Drama and Comedy on the Left Bank of the Dnipro from January 2019 until his dismissal in late 2022.

== Early life and education ==
Zhyrkov was born in 1986 in Ufa, Bashkortostan. His family later relocated to Chornomorsk near Odesa.

In 2008, he graduated from the Kyiv National University of Culture and Arts' acting and directing program under Petro Ilchenko and Kateryna Pyvovarova.

== Career ==
After graduation, Zhyrkov co-founded the independent theatre Open Gaze (also known as Open View Theater) with Kseniia Romashenko.

From 2014 to 2019, he was artistic director of the Golden Gate Theatre in Kyiv. He taught directing at the Kyiv National University of Culture and Arts from 2014 to 2017.

Since 2016, he has led youth policy and experimental theatre initiatives for the National Union of Theatre Artists of Ukraine.

In January 2019, he was appointed director and artistic director of the Left Bank Theatre. His tenure ended amid controversy in October 2022, when he was dismissed while abroad.

Since 2022, following Russia's invasion of Ukraine, he relocated to Europe and has worked in Lithuania and Germany.

== Notable works ==
Zhyrkov has directed numerous productions across Ukrainian and international stages, including:

- Natasha's Dream (2011, Open Gaze Theatre)
- Stalkers (2015, Golden Gate Theatre)
- Glory to the Heroes (2016, Golden Gate Theatre)
- At the Beginning and at the End of Time (2016, Magdeburg Theatre, Germany)
- Why Did Mykhailo Gurman Not Survive? (2017, Magdeburg Theatre, Germany)

== Filmography ==
- 2007: Stars in the Army (musical)
- 2008: King, Queen, Jack – Vitya
- 2011: Mukhtar Returns-7 (episode "Extra Ticket") – Lopukhin
- 2016: I Love My Husband (episode)

== Awards ==
- 2011: Kyiv Pectoral Theatre Award – Best Directorial Debut (Natasha's Dream)
- 2016: Kyiv Pectoral – Best Chamber Stage Performance (Stalkers)
- 2017: Kyiv Pectoral – Best Direction (Glory to the Heroes)
- 2017: Honored Artist of Ukraine
- 2021: Viva! Awards – Breakthrough of the Year in Art
