= Mykhailo Poplavskyi =

Ukrainian singer and politician

People's Artist of Ukraine Professor Mykhailo Poplavskyi
- Михайло Поплавський
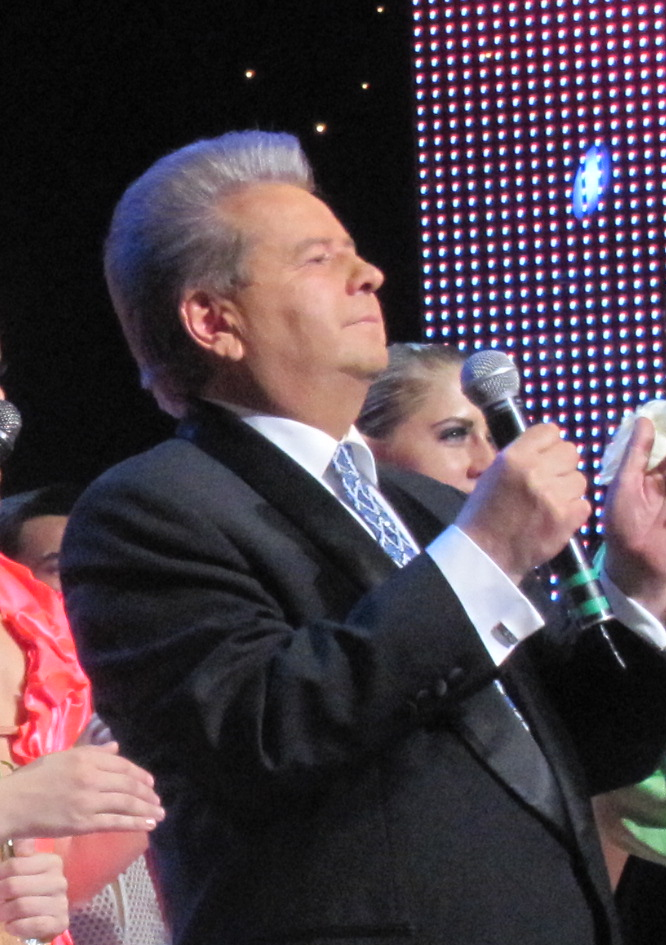
- Poplavskyi in 2010

People's Deputy of Ukraine
- In office 2014–2019
- Constituency: Electoral district No.194 (Cherkasy); Electoral district No.101 (Kirovohrad Oblast)

People's Deputy of Ukraine
- In office 2002–2006
- Constituency: Electoral district No.101 (Kirovohrad Oblast)

Rector of Kyiv National University of Culture and Arts
- In office 1995–2026

Personal details
- Born: 28 November 1949 (age 76) Mechyslavka, Ulianovka Raion, Kirovohrad Oblast, Ukrainian SSR, Soviet Union (now Ukraine)
- Party: Agrarian Party of Ukraine (since 2019)
- Other political affiliations: People's Will (2014-2019); Third Force (2006); People's Party (2005-2006); Labour Ukraine (2002-2005); For United Ukraine (2002)

Mykhailo Mykhailovych Poplavskyi (Ukrainian: Михайло Михайлович Поплавський, born 28 November 1949 in Mechyslavka, Ukrainian SSR) is a Ukrainian pedagogue, show business manager, singer, television presenter and statesman, People's Artist of Ukraine (2008). He was a longtime rector of the Kyiv National University of Culture and Arts (KNUKiM). Since 2019 Poplavskyi has led the Agrarian Party of Ukraine.

== Biography ==
Born to a peasant family in the Kirovohrad Oblast of Soviet Ukraine, Poplavskyi studied at a technical school in Horlivka, graduating in 1968. He later worked as an electric locomotive driver on a mine in Kirovske and served in the Soviet Army. In 1971 Poplavskyi finished his studies at an arts school in Oleksandriya, and during the following years headed village houses of culture in his native region. In 1980 Poplavskyi was appointed deputy manager of the Republican House of Folk Arts. Starting from 1985 he worked as a lecturer of the applied culturology department at the Kyiv State Institute of Culture. He was appointed to head that institution in 1995, after two years of serving as its acting rector, and became the youngest person on such position in Ukraine.

During his leadership in the institute, Poplavskyi introduced new educational directions, establishing the chairs of show business management, singing, bandura and kobzar arts, sports dancing, public relations, modern and folk choreography etc. In 1998-2000 Ukraine's first chair of ancient and chamber music functioned at the institute, and in 2000 a cinema and television institute was created. In 2006 Poplavskyi headed KNUKiM's chair of hotel and restaurant service. In 2015 he took the newly established post of the institute's president.

Among KNUKiM's alumni during Poplavskyi's tenure as rector are well-known singers and performers such as Iryna Bilyk, Borysenko brothers, Gaitana, Ani Lorak, Svetlana Loboda, Mika Newton, Natalia Mohylevska, Anna Sedokova, members of the bands Druha Rika and S.K.A.Y., Alan Badoev, Vlad Yama, Olga Polyakova, Natalia Zhyzhchenko, Dmytro Komarov, Mykhailo Khoma and others.

In April 2023, 30 years after first heading the institute, Poplavskyi declared his intention to step down from the post of KNUKiM's rector. On 10 February 2026 education minister Oksen Lisovyi confirmed, that Poplavskyi had left the post of rector following the end of his contract.

== Musical career ==
Known as the "Singing Rector", Poplavskyi has achieved success as a performer of songs in the style of Soviet estrada. His repertoire includes songs by Mykola Mozghovyi, Volodymyr Ivasiuk and Iryna Bilyk. He has also cooperated with songwriter Yuriy Rybchynskyi. Poplavskyi's performances are characterized with lyrical and patriotic motives, include elements of modern technology and special effects and are accompanied with dancing compositions by KNUKiM's students.

In February 2012 Poplavskyi took part in a benefit concert in Moscow, organized with the support of the Ukrainian embassy and cultural organizations in Russia and involving Ivo Bobul, Natalia Buchynska, Iosif Kobzon, Natasha Korolyova, Tatyana Ovsiyenko and Aleksander Serov.

== Media career ==
Poplavskyi has served as a creator and producer of several music projects in Ukraine, including the children's contest Krok do Zirok ("A Step to the Stars", since 2000), the TV show Nasha Pisnia ("Our Song", since 2004), the annual concert "We are your children, Ukraine!", dedicated to the birthday of Taras Shevchenko (since 2008), Mother's Day celebrations in Palace "Ukraine" (since 2008) and the contest Ukrainian Song of the Year (since 2010). Poplavskyi's projects have been broadcast live by the Pershyi television channel.

In 2012, in cooperation with the National Television Company of Ukraine, Poplavskyi organized a Ukrainian folk music television marathon, which lasted for 110 hours and entered the Guinness Book of Records as the longest media event of that type. The marathon, dedicated to the popularization of Ukrainian song in the world, was broadcast by media agencies from 155 countries, including Reuters, CNN and BBC World.

== Political career ==
In 1998 Poplavskyi ran for Verkhovna Rada as a candidate in a single-mandate constituency in his native Kirovohrad Oblast, but failed to get elected. After his election to the Verkhovna Rada in 2002, he served as deputy head of the Committee on Culture and Spirituality, taking part in preparation of law projects in the cultural sphere. He was a member of For United Ukraine and Labour Ukraine political fractions, before entering Volodymyr Lytvyn's People's Agrarian Party in 2005.

In 2006 Poplavskyi ran for Kyiv City Council under number 34 in the electoral list of the party Third Force. In 2010 he was elected member of Kyiv Oblast Council from a single-mandate constituency in Irpin. In 2012 Poplavskyi ran for Verkhovna rada from a single-mandate constituency in Kyiv Oblast.

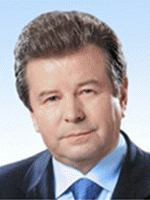
Poplavskyi's official photo as People's Deputy of Ukraine, 2014

On 15 January 2014 Poplavskyi was registered as a People's Deputy of Ukraine after winning a by-election in a single-mandate constituency in Cherkasy, where he ran as an independent during the previous month.

On 16 January 2014 Poplavskyi voted in support of the anti-protest laws in Ukraine. As a result, in July of the same year he was legally barred from heading establishments of higher education along with other deputies who had supported the laws. However, in 2017 the changes to the educational law which introduced the ban were overturned by the Constitutional Court of Ukraine.

At the 2014 Ukrainian parliamentary election Poplavskyi ran in a single-mandate constituency in Kirovohrad Oblast, winning with 31,45% of votes. In Verkhovna Rada he joined the People's Will parliamentary group, becoming member of the parliamentary Committee on Education and Science.

In advance to the 2019 Ukrainian parliamentary election Poplavskyi headed the electoral list of the Agrarian Party of Ukraine, being elected head of the party on 15 July 2019. His campaign was supported by singer Oleh Vynnyk, who declared his intention to organize a concert tour in support of the party.

== Other activities ==
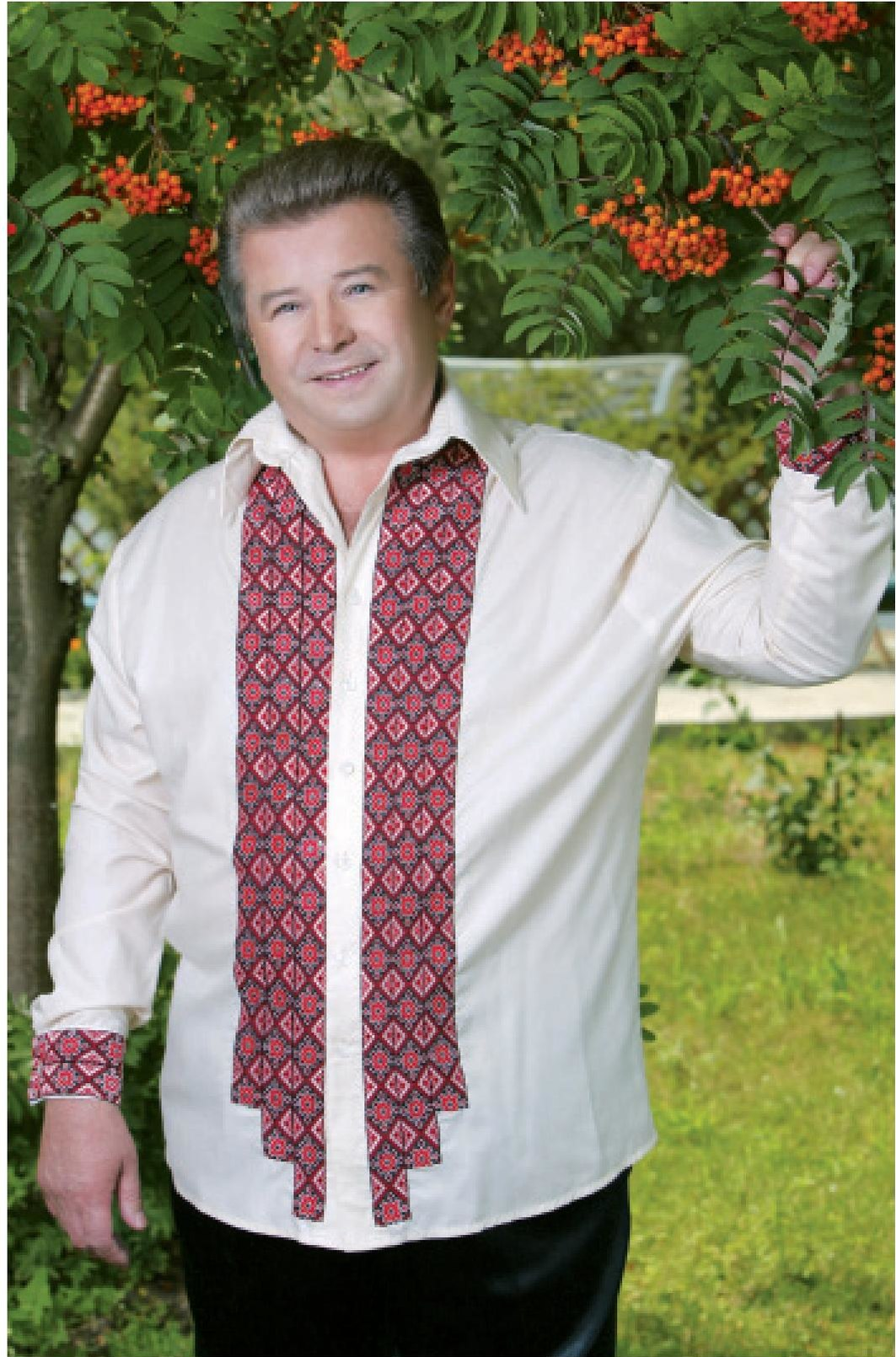
Poplavskyi wearing a vyshyvanka

During the early 2000s Poplavskyi established a number of restaurants and a network of petrol stations on the highway Kyiv-Odesa. In 2015 he sold two stations to a company owned by former energy minister Eduard Stavytsky.

Poplavskyi was elected head of the charity foundation "Gifted Children of Ukraine". In 2004 he became head of the international civic organization "Union of Ukrainians of the World".

Since 2008 Poplavskyi has been active in farming business. His son Oleksandr is the owner of Yatran meat factory, specializing in production of sausages. In 2009 Poplavskyi issued his own brand of horilka, and in 2016 registered two brands of sausages under his own name. In 2018 Poplavskyi opened a milk farm in his native village of Mechyslavka.

== Controversies ==
=== Accusations of vote buying ===
Following Poplavskyi's election to the Verkhovna Rada in 2013, journalist investigators from TVi channel claimed to have registered cases of vote buying by his representatives. Poplavskyi was also accused of acting in the interests of the Party of Regions and Cherkasy Oblast governor Serhiy Tulub, as his chief opponent had been a representative of the oppositional Batkivshchyna party.

=== Content of songs ===
Poplavskyi's songs, many of which are dedicated to dishes of traditional Ukrainian cuisine, have attracted accusations of primitivizing Ukrainian culture and leading to a decline of modern trends in Ukrainian music during the 2000s. His artistic creativity has been characterized as a classical example of kitsch.

=== Private university ===
In 2015 prosecution dropped a case against Poplavskyi and his son Oleksandr on the accusation of irregularities during the educational process in the Kyiv University of Culture, a private university established by them on the base of KNUKiM.

=== Cambridge book presentation ===
In October 2018 Poplavskyi published an Instagram post with photos from a presentation of his book of memoirs, which he claimed to have taken place at Cambridge University in the presence of one of its professors. However, a Ukrainian researcher at the university claimed that the presentation took place in a rented building at the university's territory, and had no relation to the educational establishment, with the alleged "professor" meeting Poplavskyi being a local chiropractic.

=== Harassment allegations ===
In February 2025 a former KNUKiM student claimed, that in January 2021 Poplavskyi had offered her to engage in a game of billiards in his country villa, marking each scored point with a kiss. When she refused, Poplavskyi supposedly boasted with his experience in sexual harassment. Poplavskyi himself did not comment those accusations.

== Quotes ==
Journalists call me the main villager of Ukraine. They say, that I moved to the city from a village, but still have the village inside of me. I am happy... [with that]. I love Ukrainian village very much. Long live the hands that smell of bread!

I want to say that the Ukrainian language, Ukrainian song, Ukrainian soul are eternal like the sky and the Sun. We will defeat everyone! Glory to Ukraine!

If we simply allow to buy and sell land without control, people will be deceived even more, or simply robbed. Before allowing the free sale of land, we must legally protect its owners

== Awards ==
- Golden Feather award (2000)
- Diploma of the festival "Schlager of the 20th century" (2001)
- Golden Art Olympus prize (2002)
- Muse of the Olympus award (2006)
- Person of the Year in the category "Artist of the Year" (2009)

== Sources ==
- Українська музична енциклопедія / [редкол.: Г. Скрипник (голова) та ін.] ; НАН України, Ін-т мистецтвознавства, фольклористики та етнології ім. М. Т. Рильського. - Київ : Вид-во ІМФЕ, 2006. Т. 5 : ПАВАНА - "POLIKAPП" . – 2018. – 529 c. : іл.
