= Buchinsky =

Buchinsky or Buchinski is a Slavic masculine surname, its feminine counterpart is Buchinska, Buchynska or Buchinskaya. It may refer to

- Charles Bronson (born Charles Dennis Buchinsky; 1921–2003), American film and television actor
- Natalia Buchynska (born 1977), Ukrainian singer
