= Ihor Voronka =

Ukrainian opera singer (bass), violinist, actor, soldier (1975–2024)

- Ігор Володимирович Воронка
- Born: 3 July 1975; Kyiv
- Died: 6 July 2024 (aged 49); Donetsk Oblast, Ukraine
- Education: National Music Academy of Ukraine
- Occupations: Opera singer (bass), violinist, actor, soldier
- Awards: Merited Artist of Ukraine

Ihor Voronka (Ukrainian: Ігор Володимирович Воронка; 3 July 1975, Kyiv – 6 July 2024, Donetsk Oblast, Ukraine) was a Ukrainian opera singer (bass), violinist, actor, soldier of the Armed Forces of Ukraine, and a participant in the Russian-Ukrainian war.

== Biography ==
He studied at School No. 93 in Kyiv, then at the National Music Academy of Ukraine.

He was an artist of the National Academic Capella "Dumka" (singing bass), and from 2017, he participated in projects of the "Open Opera Ukraine" art platform.

From the beginning of the full-scale invasion, he served (call sign "Atos") in the 206th separate territorial defense battalion. In 2023, he was severely wounded, later returning to duty. He had his violin with him at the front.

He died in the occupied territory of Donetsk Oblast on the evening of 6 July 2024. As of October 2024, Ihor Voronka is considered missing in action.

He is survived by his wife and son.

== Awards ==
- Merited Artist of Ukraine (2009).
