= Nadiia Broiako =

Ukrainian bandurist and folk musician (born 1960)

- Born: June 23, 1960 (age 66); Rohatyn, Ukrainian SSR, Soviet Union
- Education: National Music Academy of Ukraine
- Occupations: Bandura player, musicologist, educator
- Employer: Kyiv National University of Culture and Arts
- Awards: Merited Figure of Arts of Ukraine

Nadiia Bohdanivna Broiako (Ukrainian: Надія Богданівна Брояко; born 23 June 1960) is a Ukrainian bandura player, musicologist and educator. She is a Merited Figure of Arts of Ukraine, a professor and a candidate of art studies. She is the head of the Department of Musical Art at the Kyiv National University of Culture and Arts (KNUCA).

== Biography ==
Broyako was born on 23 June 1960 in Rohatyn, Ukraine. She graduated from the Ivano-Frankivsk Music College in 1979 and from the National Music Academy of Ukraine in Kyiv in 1984, where she studied bandura with Alla Sheptytska and orchestral conducting with Yury Aleksyk.

In 1981, Broyako became a laureate of the All-Ukrainian Competition of Performers on Folk Instruments in Odesa. From 1984 to 1986, she taught bandura at the Kharkiv Institute of Arts.

From 1993 to 1995, she served as director of the Ivano-Frankivsk Regional Music and Drama Theatre. From 1994 to 1996, she was a soloist of the chamber ensemble Classic Modern of the Ivano-Frankivsk Philharmonic, conducted by Volodymyr Pavlikovsky. From 1996 to 1998, she taught bandura at the Vasyl Stefanyk Precarpathian National University.

Since 1998, Broyako has worked at the Kyiv National University of Culture and Arts. She became a professor in 2001 and headed the Department of Kobzar Art and Bandura. She currently heads the Department of Musical Art and is a professor and candidate of art studies.

In 2007, Broyako defended a candidate dissertation on the theoretical aspects of the performing skills of bandura players. Her research focuses on the theory, history and practice of bandura performance and on the development of performers' technical skills.

Broyako is a member of the governing board of the National Union of Kobzars of Ukraine and has served as deputy head of the organization. She is also a member of the editorial board of the Bulletin of Kyiv National University of Culture and Arts. Series in Musical Art, a professional academic journal.

== Awards and honors ==
In 2007, Broyako was awarded the honorary title Merited Figure of Arts of Ukraine by a decree of the President of Ukraine for her contribution to the social, economic and cultural development of Ukraine, public activity and long-term professional work.

In 2021, she received a presidential scholarship for outstanding figures in culture and the arts.

== Research and publications ==
Broyako has published scholarly works and educational materials on bandura performance. Her publications include Theoretical Aspects of the Performing Technique of the Bandura Player (1997), My Bandura (2003), Methods of Teaching Bandura Playing (2007), and Theory and Practice of Bandura Performance (2017).

Her 2007 textbook Methods of Teaching Bandura Playing has been included in university curricula and bibliographies for the study of bandura performance and pedagogy.

Broyako has also published scholarly articles on bandura performance and kobzar studies. In 2024, she co-authored a study of kobzar performance in Soviet Ukraine, published in the Bulletin of Kyiv National University of Culture and Arts. Series in Musical Art.

In 2025, Broyako co-authored a study on the development of terminology in contemporary bandura studies.
