= Mykola Ovcharov =

Ukrainian director, orator and media artist

- Микола Овчаров
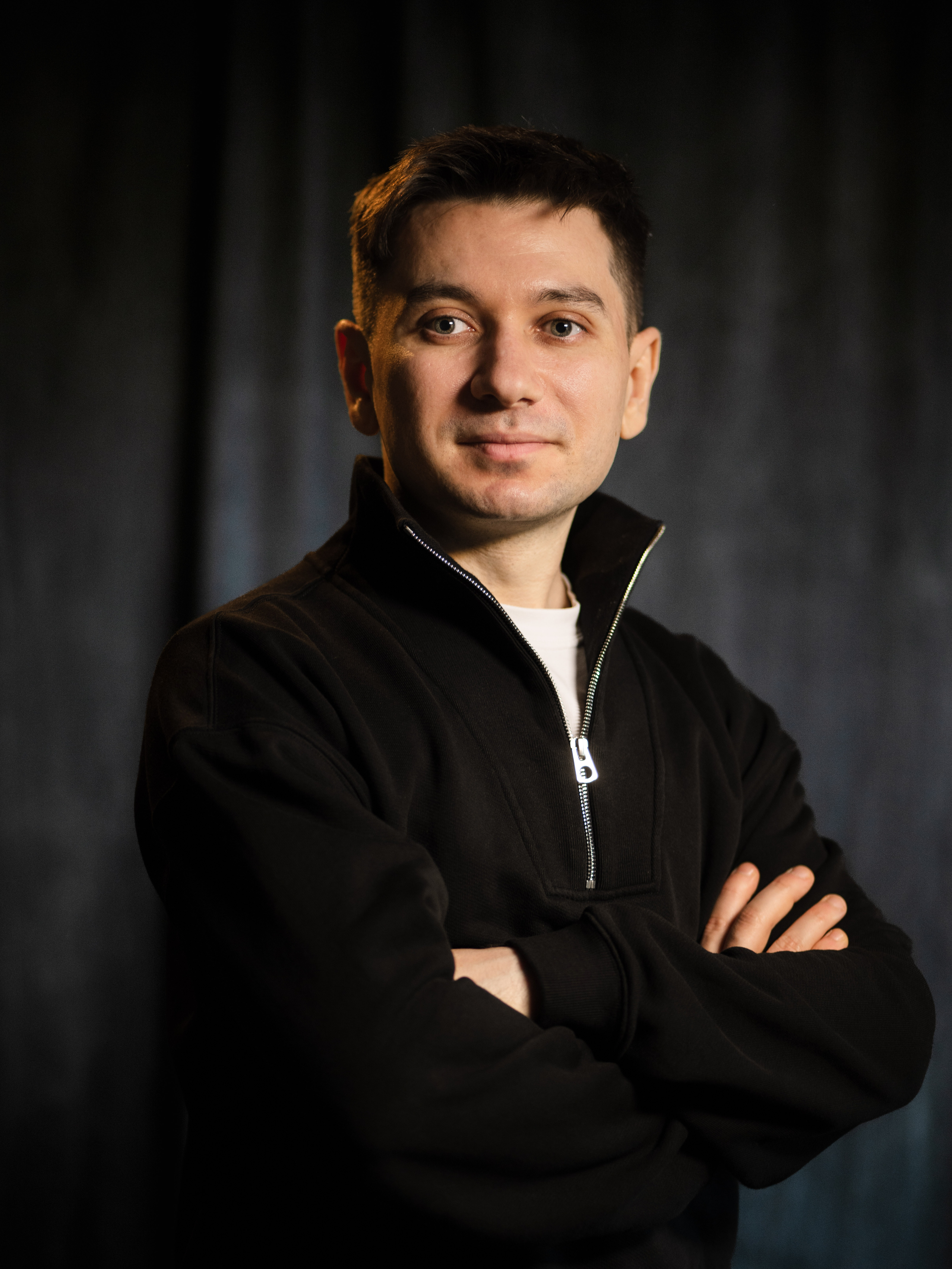
- Ovcharov in 2024
- Born: July 9, 1988 (age 38); Odesa, Odesa Oblast, Ukrainian SSR
- Citizenship: Ukrainian
- Education: Kyiv State Academy of Water Transport; Kyiv National University of Culture and Arts
- Known for: "Master of Public Speaking" (2017), journal Unknown Orator (2025)
- Scientific career
- Fields: Philosophy, rhetoric, ethics
- Workplaces: Ovcharov Institute of Rhetoric
- Website: instagram.com/mykola.ovcharov

Mykola Mykhailovych Ovcharov (born July 9, 1988) is a Ukrainian philosopher of rhetoric, orator, lecturer and researcher of oratorical art as well as a Latin translator, film director and media artist. He is the author of the contemporary rhetoric manual Master of Public Speaking, and other publications on ethics and philosophy. He is the founder, author and editor-in-chief of Unknown Orator — the first and only journal on oratorical art in Ukraine.

== Biography ==
Ovcharov was born in Odesa, Ukraine. He studied at the Kyiv State Academy of Water Transport and the Kyiv National University of Culture. He has collaborated with states and public organisations.

In 2009, he founded the Institute of Rhetoric, where he teaches oratorical art and publishes analytical articles on rhetoric, psychology, ethics, and philosophy.

In 2017, he published his first book on the theory and practice of oratorical art, Master of Public Speaking.

In 2024, he introduced two new books — Small Ethics and Evidence-Based Argumentation.

In 2025, he founded the journal Unknown Orator and published the educational manual for teachers and parents How to Raise an Orator.

In 2026, he presented the Ontology of the Human Mind in two books: Book of Fools and Book of the Wise.

== Contribution to contemporary rhetoric ==
=== Formation of authorial methodology ===
The foundation of Ovcharov's teaching methodology in oratorical art was partly laid during his studies at the Kyiv National University of Culture and Arts, where he deepened his knowledge of philosophy and cultural studies.

Training at a pantomime studio of a plastic drama theatre in Pechersk, Kyiv — using the techniques of French mimes Étienne Decroux (mime pure) and Marcel Marceau — became the basis of his unique methodology for mastering body language, which Ovcharov applies in teaching oratorical art. According to the author, it was there that he realised that an orator's gesture must be open, grounded and deliberate — principles common to both pantomime and oratorical arts.

=== Evidence-based argumentation ===
Ovcharov developed the concept of evidence-based argumentation as a method of persuasion that combines empirical substantiation with rhetorical effectiveness. In his work Evidence-Based Argumentation (2024), he systematised approaches to constructing logically structured proofs in public speaking.

==== Theory of argumentation ====
Mykola Ovcharov identifies three primary forms of argumentation in contemporary rhetoric.

- Theoretical: Factual evidence from science, research, statistics, or analytics.
- Practical: Real-life examples drawn from personal or others' experiences.
- Visual: Proof using well-known images or events.

Ovcharov identifies nine criteria for an evidence-based argument: authority of the source, its independence, reliability of information, alignment with the audience's value system, satisfaction of the audience's needs, clarity of result, disclosure of all factors that influenced the result, absence of an obvious counterargument, and uniqueness. The quality of argumentation increases when each argument is supported by an independent additional argument following the "1+1" principle.

=== Influence on Ukrainian rhetorical school ===
Ovcharov's theoretical developments contribute to the institutionalisation of rhetoric as an academic discipline in Ukraine. The Institute of Rhetoric, founded by him in 2009, functions as a research centre that combines the study of classical tradition with the development of contemporary public speaking methodologies.

From 2025, Mykola Ovcharov publishes Unknown Orator — the first and only specialised journal on oratorical art and rhetoric in Ukraine, published twice a year in Ukrainian and English.

=== Translation work ===
In 2025, he completed the first full Ukrainian translation of Cicero's First Catiline Oration from the perspective of a practicing orator. Mykola Ovcharov paid particular attention to rhythm, textual dynamics, and oratorical techniques that are typically lost in literal translation. The translation is accompanied by detailed notes on historical context, explanations of Roman life realities, and analysis of the speech's rhetorical features. The work serves students and scholars studying Roman history, philosophy, and rhetoric.

== Media art and cinema ==
In 2018, he presented his first video and media art exhibition The Interaction about human transformation from emotional to informational form. The works were displayed at the Saatchi Gallery and Freedom Art Festival in London.

In 2019, he directed his first wordless short film, Black Hole. The film explores how people mutually absorb one another for their own development. It premiered on 11 July 2019 at the Revelation Perth International Film Festival (Australia). On 29 September 2019, the film received a special jury prize at the "Bardak" Short Independent Film Festival in Kharkiv "for the director's clear handwriting, excellent and profound cinematography, and selection of distinctive characters. All elements and details work towards one goal — immersing viewers in the whimsical world created by the author".

In 2020, a second short film Wild Opera was shot, which the director decided not to release after editing.

== Public activity ==
Since 2019, he regularly conducts free masterclasses on oratorical art for specific social groups that are subject to or may face various forms of discrimination in Ukraine and globally (based on origin, gender, national or other identity) with the aim of reducing aggression levels and increasing effective communication between different people and tolerance levels.

== Bibliography ==
=== Popular science publications ===
Year	Book Title	Description
2017	Master of Public Speaking	Basic work of the author, a practical book combining the theory of oratorical art and practical exercises; in 2023 a second edition with illustrations by the author was published; in 2026 a third edition was published
2024	Small Ethics	On contemporary applied ethics
2024	Evidence-Based Argumentation	On methods of persuasion in oratorical art
2026	Book of Fools	On archetypes of foolishness
2026	Book of the Wise	On archetypes of wisdom

=== Periodical publications ===
Year	Title	Type	Description
2025	Unknown Orator	Journal	First and only journal on oratorical art and rhetoric in Ukraine, published twice yearly in Ukrainian and English

=== Educational and methodological publications ===
Year	Title	Description
2025	How to Raise an Orator	Educational manual for parents and teachers for developing oratorical qualities in children

=== Translations ===
Year	Title	Languages
2025	Translation of Cicero's First Catiline Oration	From Latin to Ukrainian
