= Victoria Vasalatiy =

Ukrainian actress and composer (born 1981)

- Вікторія Васалатій
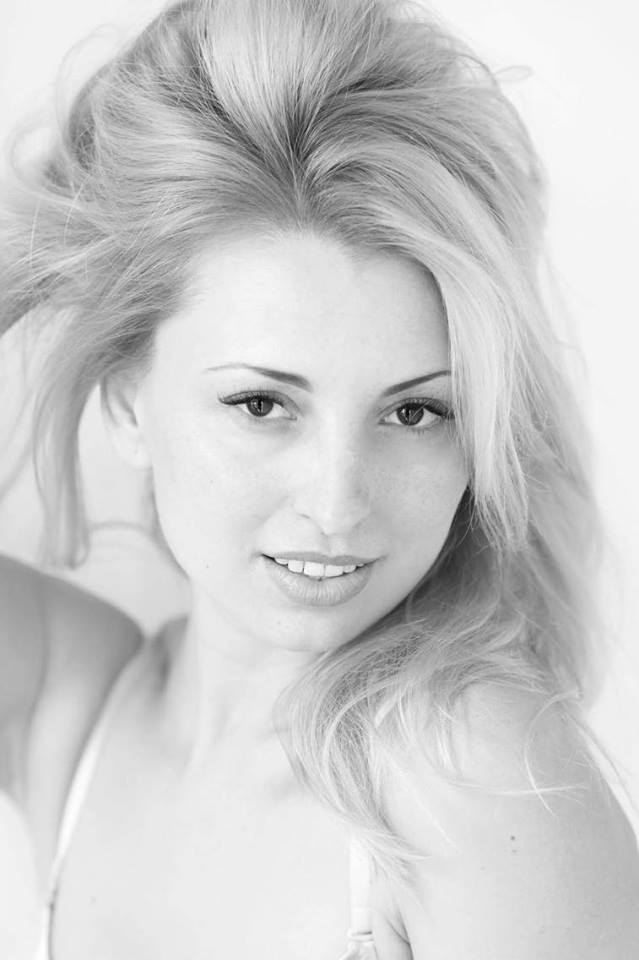
- Vasalatiy in 2017
- Born: Victoria Vitalyivna Vasalatiy; 3 October 1981 (age 44); Studena, Ukrainian SSR, Soviet Union
- Education: Kyiv National University of Culture and Arts
- Occupations: Actress; composer; singer-songwriter
- Awards: Merited Artist of Ukraine

Victoria Vitalyivna Vasalatiy (Ukrainian: Вікторія Віталіївна Васалатій; born 3 October 1981) is a Ukrainian singer, actress, composer, and singer-songwriter. She is the front woman of the Ukrainian pop-rock band "Platina" & currently a performer with the Ivan Franko National Academic Drama Theater.

== Early life ==
Vasalatiy was born in the village of Studena, Vinnytsia Oblast, on 3 October 1981, near the Moldovan (now Transnistrian) border. Her early childhood was spent in nature, collecting berries and mushrooms in the nearby forest. Though many villagers spoke a mixed language, Vasalatiy was raised in Ukrainian by her teacher parents and grandmother, who fostered a deep appreciation for the language. Creativity ran in the family—her grandmother painted and sewed, her grandfather carved wood, and her father, an artist and musician, taught drawing and managed the village House of Culture in Rudnytsia, where Vasalatiy spent much of her youth. Together, they organised concerts for every local holiday, with Vasalatiy contributing stage designs, writing scripts, and performing in a variety of roles.

Musically inclined from an early age, Vasalatiy studied piano at music school, though she never aimed to become a composer. Growing up in a household filled with music—from folk harmonies sung with her grandmother to records by The Beatles and Sofia Rotaru—she developed a strong foundation in vocal performance. She began singing publicly at village weddings and community gatherings alongside her father, often performing outdoors in challenging weather. Her debut performance, dressed in a sailor’s outfit gifted by her uncle, captured the attention of neighbours and marked the beginning of her life on stage.

== Career ==
In 1999, Vasalatiy took part in a competition in Kyiv dedicated to Volodymyr Ivasiuk, organised by Mykola Mozghovyi. Her performance at the event caught the attention of renowned songwriter Yuri Rybchinsky, who offered to compose new songs for her. At the time, Vasalatiy had planned to study history at a pedagogical university in Vinnytsia, but her path shifted dramatically after performing at the Palace "Ukraine". There, rector Mykhailo Poplavskyi publicly offered her a scholarship to study at the Kyiv National University of Culture and Arts—an unexpected announcement made on live television that left friends and acquaintances stunned, with some even questioning whether the opportunity had been bought.

Vasalatiy graduated from the university's Department of Variety Singing, where she studied under Pavlo Zibrov and Lilia Ostapenko. Eager to expand her vocal range and versatility, she trained with a variety of vocal instructors, mastering different singing styles that would shape her dynamic performance career. She went on to participate in numerous song competitions, earning recognition at events such as "Yalta-99", "Yalta-2002", and Poland's "Green Gura". Although she achieved notable success, Vasalatiy eventually stepped away from competitions, choosing instead to focus on connecting with audiences and conveying emotion through her performances.

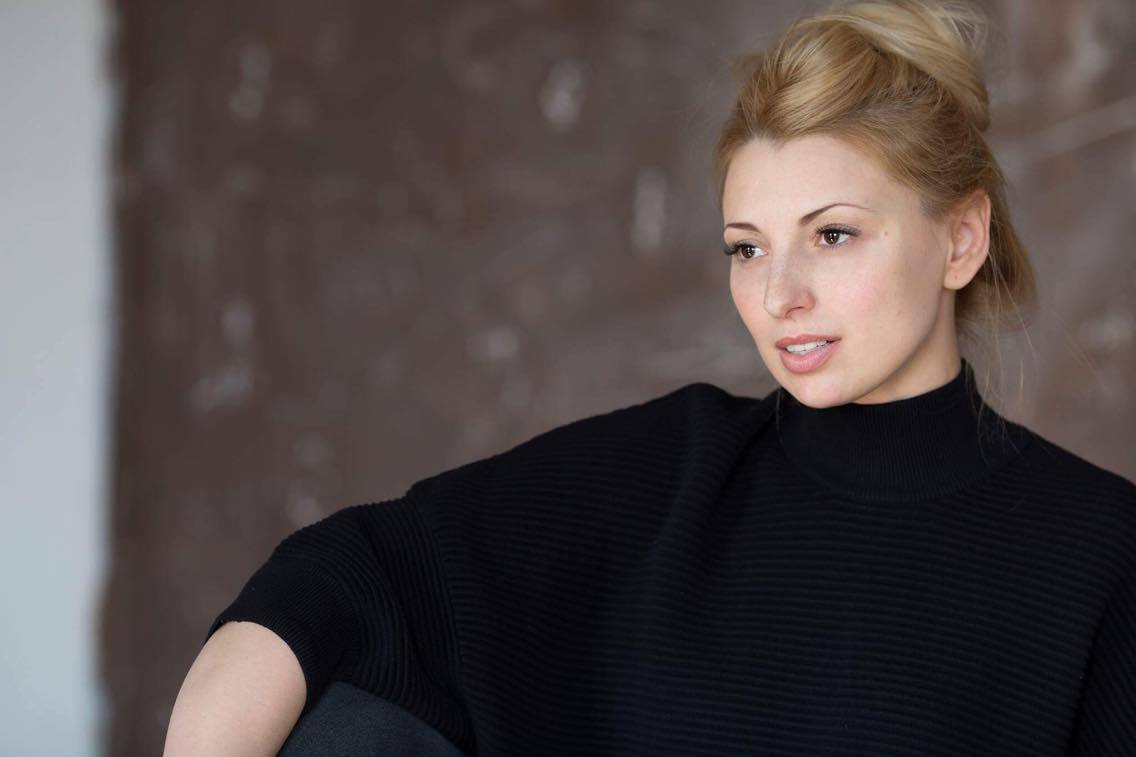
Vasalatiy in 2017

In 2016, Vasalatiy performed the role of Fleur de Lys in a Ukrainian adaptation of the French musical Notre-Dame de Paris, staged at the Palace "Ukraine" to a sold-out audience. The show received overwhelming applause and standing ovations, with Vasalatiy sharing the stage alongside notable talents such as Arsen Mirzoyan and Anton Kopytin.

In early 2019, Vasalatiy joined an international project in Paris to perform Édith Piaf's songs, and later starred in the musical Edith and Marseille at the Ivan Franko National Theater, where she once again portrayed the iconic French singer. For over a decade, Vasalatiy had captivated audiences in the theatre's successful production Едіт Піаф. Життя в кредит, for which she composed the music and played the lead role. It was this performance that caught the attention of French impresarios, inspiring them to present the "Ukrainian Edith" to audiences in France.

== Awards ==
- XIV International Theater Festival of Women's Monodramas "Maria" (2017)
- Kyiv Pectoral Award (2019)
- Merited Artist of Ukraine (2020)
