= Michael Brunsky =

- Born: November 18, 1986 (age 39); Zdolbuniv, Rivne Oblast, Ukraine
- Genres: POP,Rock,Classical
- Occupations: Singer, composer
- Instruments: Piano, vocals
- Years active: 2005–present

Mykhailo Semuniuk-Brunsky (born November 18, 1986, in Zdolbuniv, Rivne Oblast) is a Ukrainian singer, composer, and professor. He became an Honored Artist of Ukraine in 2017.

== Awards ==
Brunsky was conferred the honorary title of Honored Artist of Ukraine in 2017 in recognition of his contributions to Ukrainian culture and the performing arts.
