= Evgeniy Svetlitsa =

Ukrainian ballet dancer

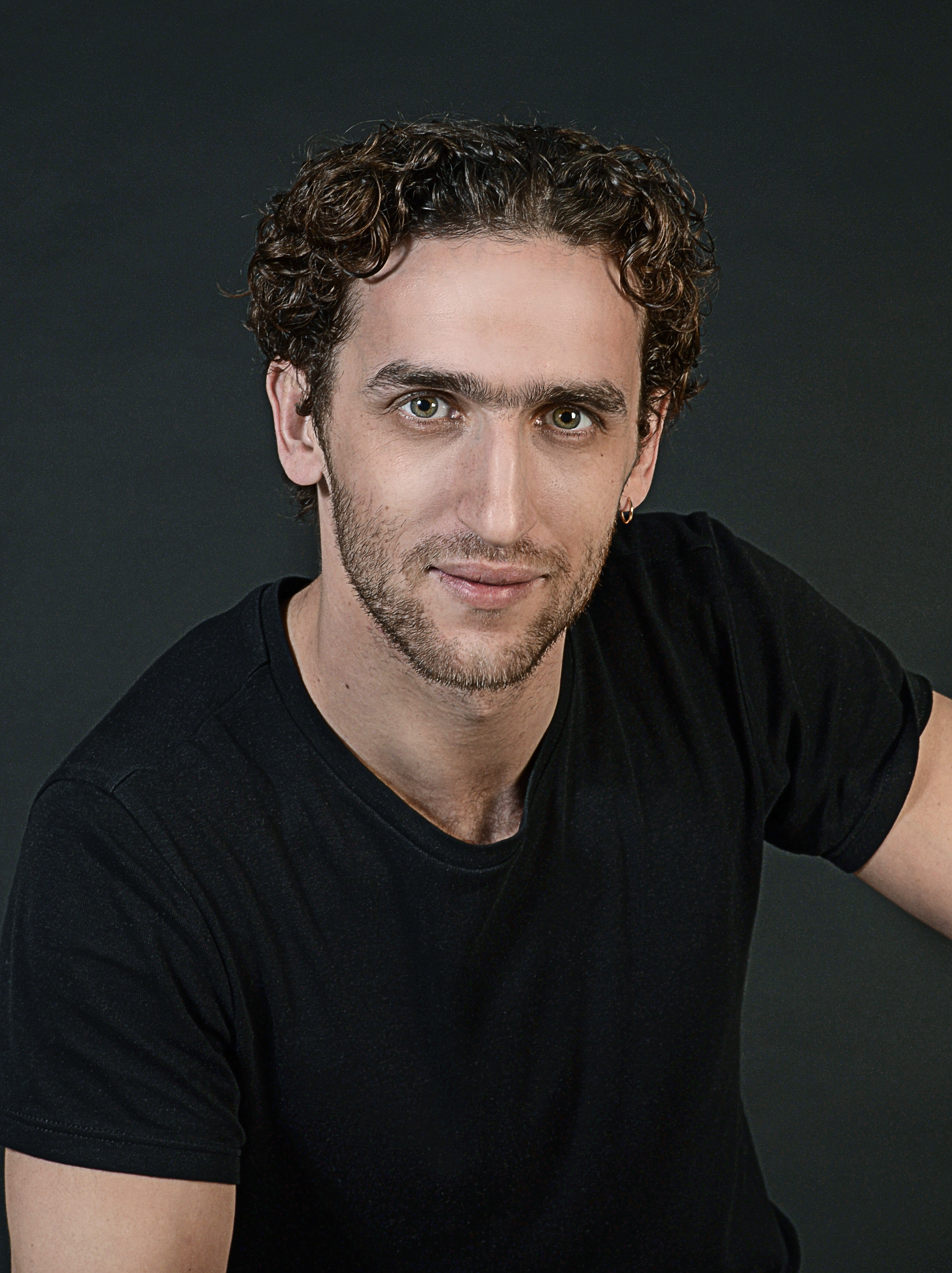
- Born: Evgeniy Svetlitsa; 24 February 1983 (age 42); Lviv, Ukraine
- Occupation: Ballet dancer
- Years active: 2001–present
- Career
- Current group: Lviv Theatre of Opera and Ballet

Evgeniy Svetlitsa (Ukrainian: Євгеній Свєтліца, Russian: Евгений Светлица; born 24 February 1983) is a Ukrainian ballet dancer, and former soloist at Lviv Theatre of Opera and Ballet from 2000 until 2022. Merited Artist of Ukraine since 2015. Winner of the Vadim Pisarev Prize.

== Early life and training ==
Svetlitsa was born in Lviv, Ukraine. From early childhood, he attended various dance classes. Between 1994 and 1999, Svetlitsa studied at the Lviv State Choreographic School. In 1999 he entered the Kiev University of Culture and Arts. In 2004 he graduated from the university with a degree in choreography. From 2017 to 2018, he studied at the Taras Shevchenko's University in Lugansk, graduated with a master's degree in choreography. Svetlitsa became affiliated with the Lviv Opera and Ballet Theater in 2000. As of 2022 he is on unpaid leave and has violated the requirements of his contract with the theatre.

== Repertoire ==
=== Roles performed ===
	Ballet	Roles performed
2001	Swan Lake	Prince
2001	La Bayadère	Golden God
2005	Coppélia	Franz
2005	Scheherazade (Rimsky-Korsakov)	Slave
2005	La Esmeralda	Claude Frollo
2006	Francesca de Remini	Paolo
2006	Vain precaution	Colen
2006	Creations of the world	Solor
2007	La Bayadère	
2007	The Nutcracker	Prince
2008	Paquita	Cavalier
2008	Return butterfly	Puccini
2008	Don Quixote	Basile, Espada
2009	Lilea	Stepan
2010	Romeo and Juliet	Romeo
2010	Gisele	Альберт
2011	Romeo and Juliet	Tibald
2011	Spartak	Spartak
2012	Cinderella	Prince
2013	Chopeniana	Young man
2013	Swan Lake	Rodbart
2014	Gisele	Hanz
2015	Scheherazade (Rimsky-Korsakov)	Slave
2015	Carmen suite	Jose
2016	The Sleeping Beauty	Prince
2017	Snow White and the Seven Dwarfs	Prince
2018	La Esmeralda	Phoebe de Chateau
2018	The Sleeping Beauty	Blue Bird
2018	Gisele	pas de pa

Svetlitsa performs leading ballet parts as a soloist not only in the Lviv Opera and Ballet Theater, but also as a guest soloist. As of June 2022 he is no longer listed as a principal dancer of the Lviv Opera and Ballet Theater following his participation in RBTheater's production of “Swan Lake” and its subsequent tour in the United States. According to the Lviv National Opera his participation in RBTheater's production "has violated the requirements of [his] contract with the theater."

=== Guest soloist ===
- 2014 - the ballet Carmen - choreography by Nadezhda Kalinina - Jose
- 2016 - the ballet Spartak National Opera of Ukraine - Spartak
- In 2015 - 2016, he went on tour in the United States as a guest soloist in Swan Lake.
- In 2017, he was invited to Milan, Italy to participate in Swan Lake ballet along with the school Ukrainian Academy of Ballet.
- In 2018 he took part in representing the Ukrainian ballet at gala concerts in Brazil, Argentina, Chile, Peru.
- In 2022 he again played the role of Prince Siegfried in RBTheater's new production of Swan Lake.

Guest soloist in performances of theatres in France, China, Poland, Spain, Portugal, Germany, Switzerland, the Czech Republic, Italy, Sweden, the Netherlands.

Critics call Evgeniy a master of his art and a joy to behold

They also note the beautiful balletic footwork and difficult steps with refined style, performed by Evgeniy. He dances with verve and elasticity

== Awards ==
Winner of the international ballet competition Arabesque–2008 named after Ekaterina Maximova - Perm, 2008
