= Alla Abelyeva =

Ukrainian actress (born 1938)

Alla Vasylivna Abelyeva (Ukrainian: Алла Василівна Абелєва; 15 May 1938 – after 2001) was a Ukrainian theatre actress. She is a Merited Artist of the Ukrainian SSR and People's Artist of Ukraine.

== Biography ==
Alla Vasylivna Abelyeva was born on 15 May 1938, in Chelyabinsk. She graduated from the Chelyabinsk Choreographic School in 1961. She has been part of the Regional Musical-Dramatic Theatre Taras Shevchenko in Chernihiv since 1962. In 1976, she became a Merited Artist of the Ukrainian SSR. In 2001, she became a People's Artist of Ukraine. Abelyeva died after 2001.

== Theatre credits ==
Title	Author	Role	Ref(s)
U nedilyu rano zillya kopala	O. Kobylianska	Tetyanka	
Viy, viterets!	Ya. Rainis	Barbara	
Do pobachennya, Edit!	L. Sukharevska	Edith Piaf	
Zamuleni dzherela	M. Kropyvnytskyi	Zhenya	
Potomky zaporozhtsiv	O. Dovzhenko	Tarasyk	
Trembita	Yu. Milyutin	Olesya	
Tsyganka Aza	M. Starytsky	Aza	
Sylva	I. Kalman	Stasi	
Maritsa	I. Kalman	Lizzi	
Grushenka	M. Leskov	Grushenka	
Kokhannyam ne zhartuyut	P. Calderon	Inessa	
Eneyida	I. Kotlyarevsky	Syvilla	
Vash khid, korolevo!	E. Skryb	Anna	
Cholovik moyeyi druzhyny	H. Khugaev	Faryzad	
Zaruchyny po-frantsuzky	K. Magnier	Madame Carlier	
Palyvoda	I. Tobilevych	Starostykha	
Yama	O. Kuprin	Anna Markivna	
Piznya serenada	V. Ilyin	Nina Leonidivna	
Moya charivna ledi	F. Lowe	Eliza	
Amerykanska trahediya	T. Dreiser	Roberta Alden	
