= Iryna Horoshko =

- Ірина Матвієнко
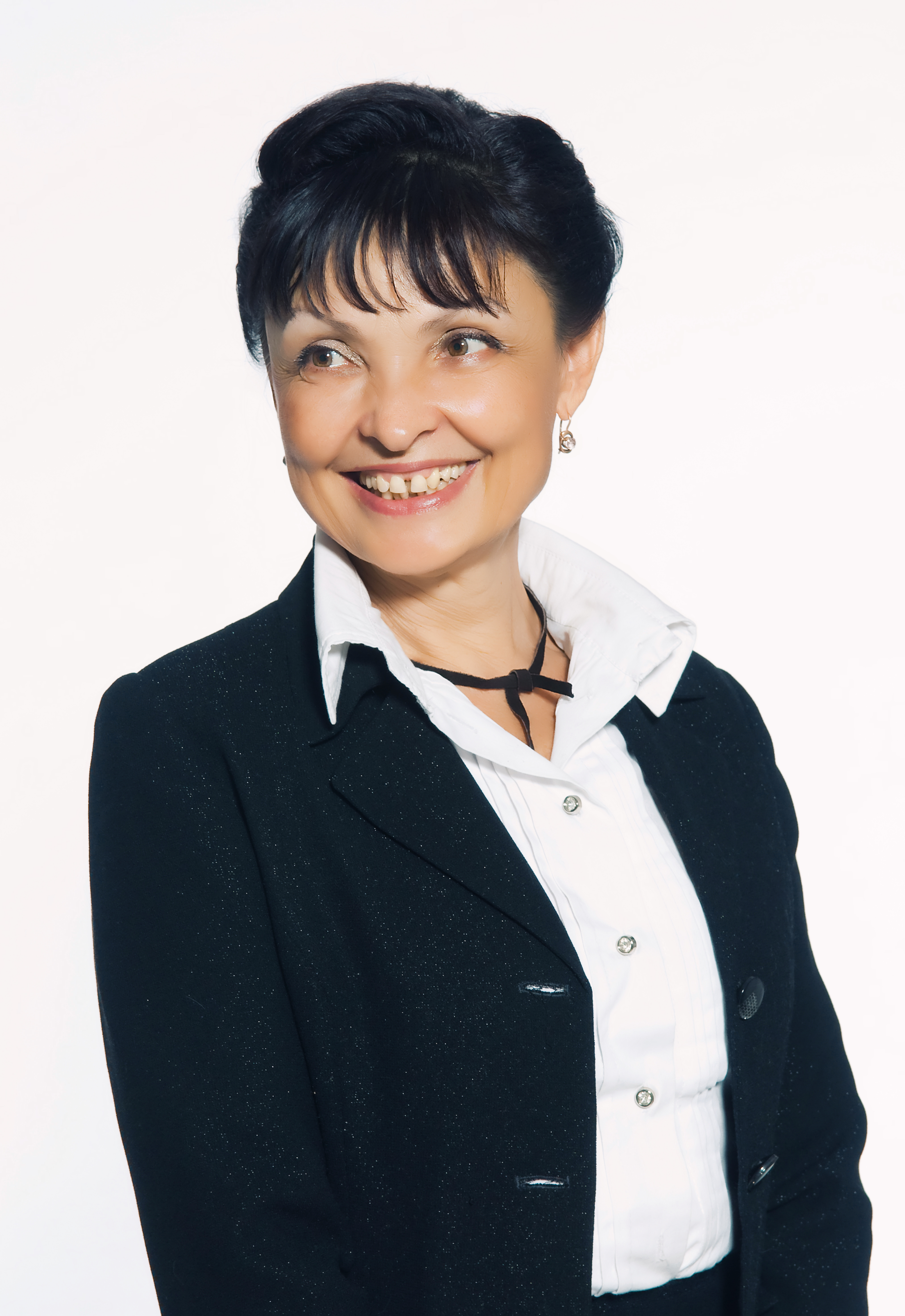
- Born: Iryna Matviyenko Horoshko; 28 November 1953; Novomoskovsk, Dnipropetrovsk Oblast, Ukrainian SSR, Soviet Union
- Died: 27 January 2018 (aged 64); Samar, Dnipropetrovsk Oblast, Ukraine
- Occupations: Choreographer; Dancer
- Awards: Merited Artist of the Ukrainian SSR

Iryna Matviyenko Horoshko (Ukrainian: Ірина Григорівна Матвієнко; 28 November 1953 – 27 January 2018) was a Ukrainian choreographer and dancer. She was the artistic director of the folk dance ensemble "Nadzbruchanka" of the Ternopil Regional Philharmonic and led the Beaumonde contemporary dance studio (then "Inspiration") at the Dvorets Kultury Metallurgov. Horoshko was a recipient of the Merited Artist of the Ukrainian SSR.

== Early life and education ==
Horoshko was born in the city of Novomoskovsk, Dnipropetrovsk Oblast, Ukraine on 28 November 1953. She was the child of the metallurgists Grigory Ignatovich Hnatovych and Alexandra Andreevna Matvienko. Horoshko was educated at the ZZSO No. 4 secondary school and later at the Dnipropetrovsk State College of Theatre and Arts. She graduated from the college with honours in 1973. Horoskho later studied an art diploma at the National Academy of Visual Arts and Architecture under the tutelage of O. Aseev and Lyudmyla Milyayeva from 1978 to 1982.

== Career ==
When she was nine years old, she began her dancing career at the Shevchenko Palace of Culture ballet school. Its head, Anna Dmitrievna Krasovskaya, commended Horoshko. She joined the ballet studio of the Palace of Culture named after Gonchar in 1964 under the tutelage of Larisa Petrovna Kyrylenko and later Bohdan Stanislavovich Ivanytskyi. Horoshko performed solo roles in The Fly-Tsokotukha and The Snow Queen. She was invited to perform in the dance ensemble of the Transcarpathian Honoured Academic Folk Choir before her parents sent her to the Dnipropetrovsk State College of Theatre and Arts. In 1973, Horoshko joined the folk dance ensemble "Nadzbruchanka" of the Ternopil Regional Philharmonic, serving as its artistic director, and she was managed under the direction of choreographer Oleksandr Danichkin. She had solo roles in miniatures such as Podolyanochka, Petrus, Nadzbruchanka, Gandzia and Ternopil Wedding. Horoshko tourned across most of the Soviet Union at venues such as Palace "Ukraine" and the State Kremlin Palace as well as countries such as Bulgaria, Czechoslovakia, Germany and Romania.

She and her husband worked at the Medobory collective and were involved in emi-classical, flamenco and tap choreography between 1988 and 1990. In 1990, Horoshko returned to Novomoskovsk and accepted the offer of leading the Beaumonde contemporary dance studio (then "Inspiration") at the Dvorets Kultury Metallurgov. She staged more than sixty of her own concerts and achieved victories in over 50 festivals and competitions across Ukraine and abroad. Horoshko continued working with her students until November 2017.

== Personal life, death, and recognition ==
She married the choreographer Anatoly Goroshka in 1972. There was one child of the marriage. In 2017, Horoshko was diagnosed with cancer and continued to work through the illness. She died on 27 January 2018 in Samar, Dnipropetrovsk Oblast. Horoshko was buried at Maryanovsky cemetery in Samar.

In 1985, she was awarded the Merited Artist of the Ukrainian SSR "for high performing skills, the creation of highly artistic images, performances, and films that have become part of the national cultural and artistic heritage."
