= Unknown Orator =

Ukrainian journal on oratorical art

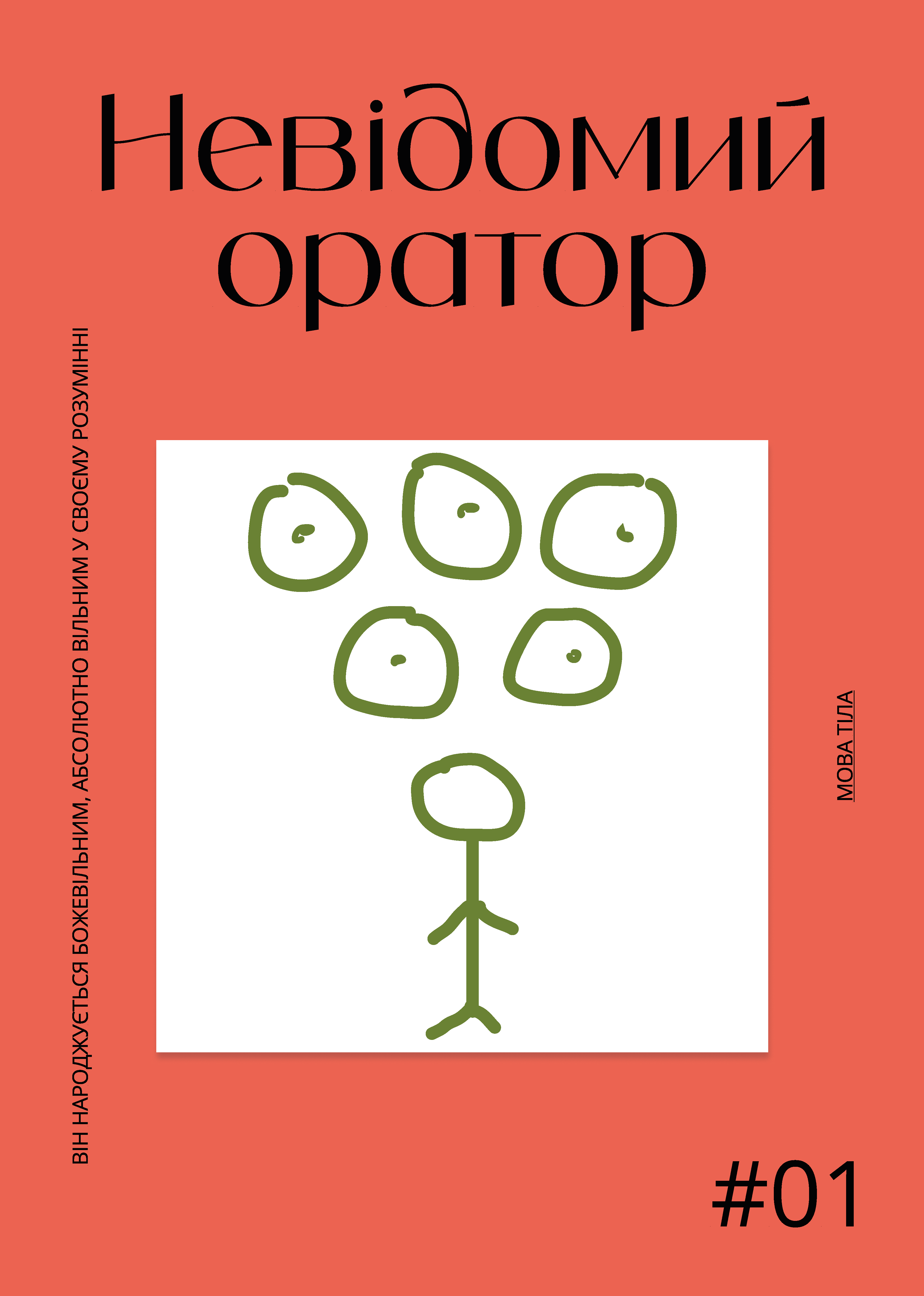
- Cover of the first issue (2025)
- Editor: Mykola Ovcharov
- Frequency: Twice yearly
- Founder: Mykola Ovcharov
- Founded: 2025
- Country: Ukraine
- Language: Ukrainian, English
- Website: journal.ovcharov.institute
- ISSN: 3083-7294 (print); 3083-7480 (web)

Unknown Orator (Невідомий оратор) is the first and only specialised journal on oratorical art and rhetoric in Ukraine. Founded in 2025 by philosopher of rhetoric Mykola Ovcharov, who serves as its founder, author and editor-in-chief. The journal is published twice a year in Ukrainian and English.

== History ==
Prior to the founding of Unknown Orator, no specialised publication on oratorical art had ever existed in Ukraine. While in the United States and most European Union countries rhetoric as an academic discipline has its own peer-reviewed journals with decades of tradition, Ukrainian readers — both professional and general — had no access to quality Ukrainian-language literature in this field.

The journal was founded within the framework of the Ovcharov Institute of Rhetoric (Kyiv). All materials from both issues are available in open access at journal.ovcharov.institute. The journal is also published in print format.

== Issues ==
No.	Year	Theme
1	2025	Body language and non-verbal communication
2	2026	Rhetoric and democracy

=== Issue 1 (2025): Body Language ===
The first issue is devoted to the theme of body language and non-verbal communication. It contains 21 articles.

=== Issue 2 (2026): Rhetoric and Democracy ===
The second issue explores the relationship between rhetoric and democracy: how the public word protects freedom, how authoritarian propaganda operates, and how communication transforms in times of war. It contains 6 articles.

== Registration ==
- ISSN: 3083-7294 (print)
- ISSN: 3083-7480 (online)
- DOI prefix: 10.66597
- Print media identifier: R30-06338
- Online media identifier: R40-06339

== Founder ==
Mykola Ovcharov is a Ukrainian philosopher of rhetoric, founder of the Ovcharov Institute of Rhetoric (Kyiv, 2009), researcher, lecturer, and author of the books Master of Public Speaking (2017), Small Ethics and Evidence-Based Argumentation (2024), How to Raise an Orator (2025), Book of Fools and Book of the Wise (2026). In 2025, he completed the first annotated translation of Cicero's First Oration Against Catiline into contemporary Ukrainian. For more details, see Mykola Ovcharov.
