= Susanna Karpenko =

Ukrainian composer and singer (born 1978)

- Сусанна Карпенко
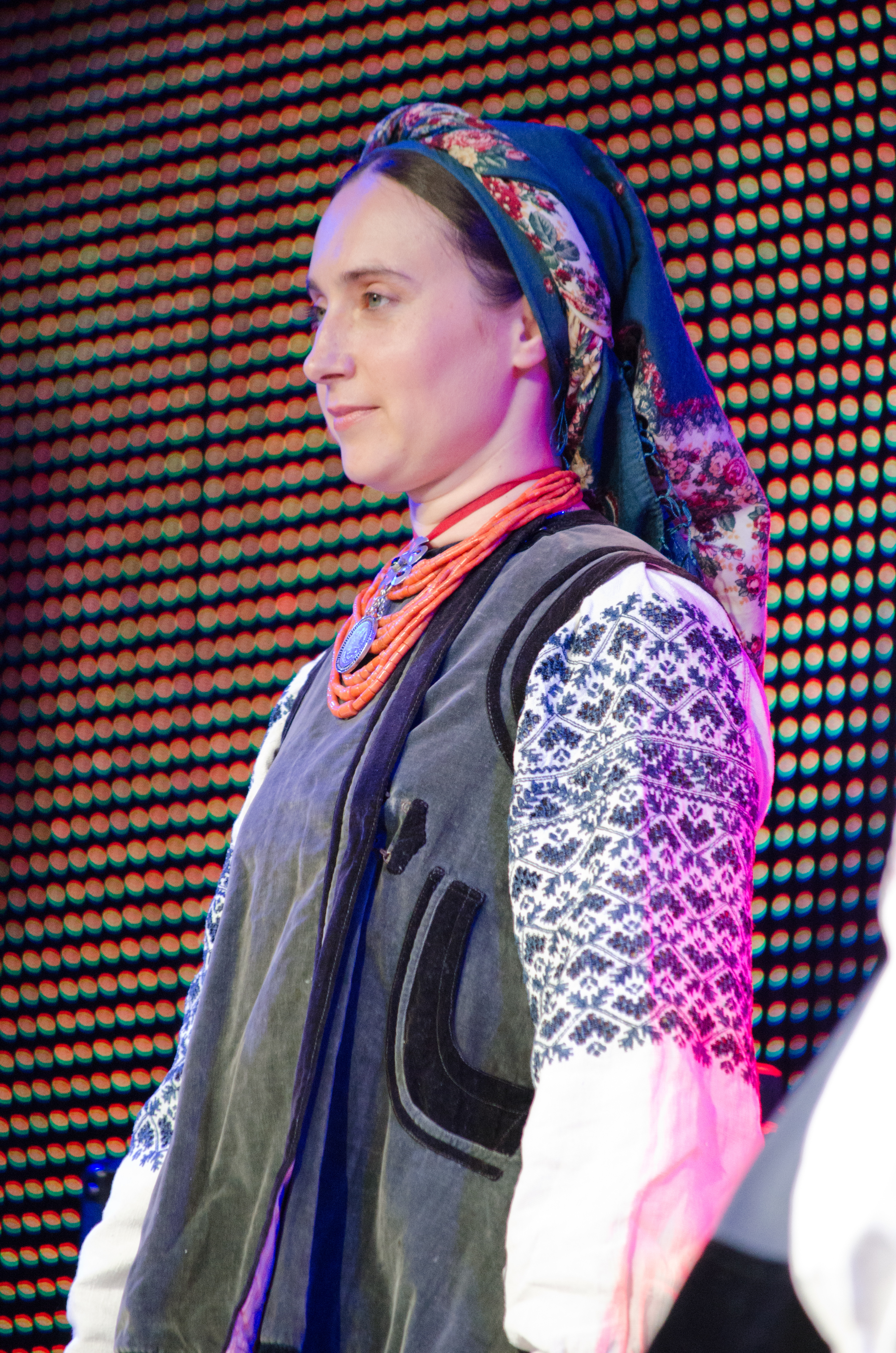
- Karpenko in 2013
- Born: 28 January 1978 (age 48); Kyiv, Ukrainian SSR, Soviet Union
- Education: Kyiv National University of Culture and Arts
- Occupations: Composer; singer
- Spouse: Ilya Fetisov
- Awards: Shevchenko National Prize

Susanna Yevheniivna Karpenko (Ukrainian: Суса́нна Євге́ніївна Карпе́нко; born 28 January 1978) is a Ukrainian composer and singer. She currently serves as the chief choirmaster of the Ivan Franko National Academic Drama Theater and is the co-head of the folk ensemble Bozhychi. In addition to her performance work, she teaches traditional singing at the choral studio of the Veryovka Ukrainian Folk Choir and leads the children's folk ensemble Rayhorodok.

== Early life and education ==
Susanna Yevheniivna Karpenko was born on 28 January 1978 in the city of Kyiv. Karpenko spent a significant part of her childhood in the village of Krasylivka, Bakhmach Raion, where her mother, Valentyna Vitaliivna Karpenko, was from. Her grandparents lived there, and their house remains in the family to this day. Her parents divorced when she was little, and from the age of ten to fourteen, she lived with her grandparents. It was during this time, while attending Krasylivska school, that she discovered her love for music. She began playing the piano on her own, even teaching herself to read musical notes that happened to be lying on the instrument.

Karpenko later pursued formal music education and graduated from the Faculty of Musical Arts at the Kyiv National University of Culture and Arts, specialising in folklore.

== Career ==
Upon graduation, Karpenko worked as a vocal teacher with the folk dance ensemble Barvinok and at Children's School of Arts No.2. She also taught folk singing at the Veryovka Ukrainian Folk Choir and served as the head of the Department of Intangible Cultural Heritage at the Ivan Honchar Museum.

Since 2000, she has been the leader and a performer in the folklore ensemble Bozhychi, which brings together professional musicians and researchers of Ukrainian traditional art—graduates of the folklore departments of the Ukrainian National Tchaikovsky Academy of Music and the Kyiv National University of Culture and Arts. In 2012, she appeared on the television programme Holos Krainy (The Voice of the Country). Since 2020, she has served as the chief choirmaster of the Ivan Franko National Academic Drama Theater.

== Personal life ==
Karpenko met her husband, Ilya Fetisov, at a music conference. Like her, he is a musician, and their shared passion for traditional music brought them together both personally and professionally. The couple lives in Kyiv, in a modest two-room apartment made possible with the help of Ilya's parents. Their home is filled with music and family life. They have a daughter, Serafina.

== Awards ==
- Kyiv Pectoral Theatre Award (2014)
- Shevchenko National Prize (2024)
