= Oleksandr Knyha =

Ukrainian theatre director (born 1959)

Oleksandr Andriyovych Knyha
- Олександр Андрійович Книга
- Born: March 26, 1959 (age 67); Pokrovka, Ukrainian SSR, Soviet Union
- Occupation: Theatre director
- Years active: 1987 - present
- Known for: Kherson Regional Academic Music and Drama Theatre named after Mykola Kulish; Melpomene Of Tavria

Oleksandr Andriyovych Knyha (Ukrainian: Олександр Андрійович Книга; born 26 March 1959) is a Ukrainian theatre director based in Kherson. He has served as the long-standing director of the Kherson Regional Academic Music and Drama Theatre named after Mykola Kulish, and as president and founder of the international theatre festival Melpomene of Tavria.

Knyha was born in 1959 in Mykolaiv Oblast, before moving to Kherson Oblast following the completion of his secondary schooling. After graduating from the Kherson College of Culture and Education and then the Kyiv National University of Culture and Arts, he started working as an artistic director within Kherson Oblast, before becoming director of the main theatre in Kherson in 1989. He has overseen the complete overhaul of the theatre and its expansion into a leading cultural institution. He founded the Melpomene of Tavria in 1999 in order to promote Ukrainian theatre, and it is held every year. He has also been active in cultural and social initiatives in the region, serving in roles such as Chairman of the Eurasian Theatre Association and member of the Kherson Regional Council. During the Russian occupation of Kherson in 2022, he was abducted by occupying Russian forces before being released, and he later testified before the International Court of Justice about his detention and the conditions in the region during the occupation.

== Early life and education ==
Knyha was born on 26 March 1959 in the village of Pokrovka, which was then part of Mykolaiv Oblast in the Ukrainian SSR. After completing secondary schooling in 1976, he initially pursued a professional career after moving to Kherson Oblast, working as an installer at PMK No. 132 of the Khersonvodbud Trust. However, he decided to eventually pursue a higher education, and attended the Kherson College of Culture and Education, specializing in cultural and education work there. He graduated from the school in 1981, and then started attending the Kyiv National University of Culture and Arts, majoring in cultural and educational work again, and then graduated from that school in 1987 with a qualification to be a cultural worker and leader of amateur theatre. At the school, he was lectured under N. Bychenko and P. Ilchenko. Decades later in 2005 he began studying in the postgraduate program at the National Academy of Government Managerial Staff of Culture and Arts to further his qualifications.

== Theatre work ==
=== Kherson Theatre ===
After graduation, he worked for a year at the Vynohradove House of Culture as its artistic director, then later as its full director. Afterwards, he became Head of the Department of Culture of the Tsiurupynsk (now Oleshky since 2016) District Council. In 1989, he was finally appointed Head of the Kherson Regional Academic Music and Drama Theatre named after Mykola Kulish. As he later recalled, the theatre was in a difficult period as it had been partially destroyed during World War II, and colleagues would sometimes ask him whether the theatre was closing. Over the following years, he worked to rebuild the theatre, expanding it to have seven distinct performance spaces: a main stage, a cafe, an under-the-roof stage, an experimental open-air stage, a stage-under-the-circle, a theatrical courtyard, and a stage-within-a-stage. In its peak, the theatre performed around 36 to 40 shows per month and released between 12 and 17 premieres annually.

Knyha mainly worked with attracting younger audiences to the theatre, as he opened the experimental under-the-roof stages to target a younger audience and brought in young directors with unconventional productions to try and extract this audience. He also explored the idea of late-night performances at the theatre following a visit to Perm and considered open-air productions after a visiting company from Minsk used a forest setting. He eventually promoted the open-air concert for the theatre by establishing an outdoor stage in conjunction with the theatre at the farmstead "Chumats'ki Krynytsi" on the edge of the Oleshky Sands, with seating for around 200 spectators.

He also helped bring the theatre into an international profile. The company frequently toured Paris under his direction, where they performed entirely in the Ukrainian language at places like Théâtre Watteau. The theatre also started touring Bulgaria. Due to his work, the theatre has become a hub for the city of Kherson.

=== Melpomene of Tavria ===
In 1999, he founded the Kherson-based "Melpomene of Tavria", which is a theatre festival. He has served as its president. The idea was suggested to him by Mykola Berson, who was the then director of the Mykolaiv Theatre, but only came into fruition because the Kherson Theatre was starting to gain popularity at the time. However, the theatre nearly did not continue after its first year, as Knyha had to spend an entire year paying off the debts for its organization after the first festival in 1999. Although at first the festival was limited to participants from Ukraine, in 2004 it became truly international with theatres coming from Hungary and the unrecognized state of Transnistria.

Since its founding, the primary funding for the festival has been the audience's tickets, although it has received some state and local support. They later won a grant from the Ukrainian Cultural Foundation (UCF) and 110,000 UAH from Kherson city in 2010. The jury for the festival has been mainly composed of journalists since the early 2010s, when the concept was first introduced at the 14th edition of the festival. The festival has traditionally opened with a solemn parade through Kherson, and then events happen such as competition plays, theatrical "skits" known as kapustnnyks, gala concerts, and street events.

In 2014, during the War in the Donbas, the motto of the event became "Single Country", which led to many previous theatres from Russia declining to attend, leading to more theatres from Belarus, Latvia, Hungary, and Portugal coming. In 2018, during one of the festival's largest years, 104 theatres from 61 cities across 15 countries showcased 232 productions at the festival. It is also noted for its role in helping found the "Ordinary Role – Special Actor" theatre in Kherson for children with disabilities. During the occupation of Kherson in 2022, for the first time, the festival was moved from Kherson to Lviv and it became a multi-location event with virtual performances. It featured 64 performances from 34 cities under the slogan "Melpomene is the voice of the Kherson region". The Ukrainian president, Volodymyr Zelenskyy, also addressed the participants and highlighted the festival as a tool of resistance. It was also the first year the festival did not award prizes or have a jury because of the unequal conditions for participants from Eastern Ukraine. It also featured an "Education Platform" with online lectures and a literary stage involving international and Ukrainian authors with a special block dedicated to participants in theatre who were soldiers or volunteers.

=== Social projects ===
Knyha has been known for his push for social initiatives in Kherson. In January 2020, the theatre under his direction co-launched a mono-performance titled Illuzia (Illusion) in partnership with the Kherson branch of the International Anti-Drug Association.. The show featured an actor who drew from his own life experiences with drug addiction. Knyha came up with the idea after visiting the drug association's therapy camp in Kyiv. Later that year, in December 2020, he initiated the "I Value Doctors" campaign during the Covid-19 pandemic. He invited members of the public to photograph themselves wearing a mask with the message "I wear a mask - I value doctors", which was then shared on social media. He did this to express solidarity with medical staff on the front lines. Three years later in 2023 Knyha became the head of the cultural delegation from Kherson to the Black Sea Games, which were held for the first time in Kyiv after its traditional venue of Skadovsk came under occupation.

He has also served as Chairman of the Eurasian Theatre Association and as a member of the Kherson Regional Council.

== Occupation and liberation of Kherson ==
On 24 February 2022, Knyha attempted to head to the theatre to open the bomb shelters there and instruct staff on evacuations. He then attempted to return to his home in Oleshky via the Antonivka Road Bridge, but was warned that Russian forces had already reached the town and retreated to Kherson, but attempted to cross again later into Oleshky by rowboat and was successful.

He decided to remain in Oleshky during the occupations instead of leaving, and on 23 March 2022 was abducted from his home in Oleshky by Russian forces. He was then driven to the Kherson pretrial detention center (SIZO) and accused of financing pro-Ukrainian rallies. During the interrogation, he was given the choice to go free, as long as Russian forces were allowed to monitor the theatre's repertoire and was also offered a leadership role in the regional administration to maintain order. He rejected both demands. Later that day, the de jure Mayor of Oleshky, Yevhen Ryshchuk, went public with the news of his kidnapping, saying that he was taken to an unknown area. He was released the following day after diplomatic pressure from the Ministry of Culture, the National Union of Theatre Artists of Ukraine under Bogdan Strutynskyi, the international theatre community, and the Eurasian Theatre Association. On 6 April 2022 he decided to evacuate with his family via the route to Snihurivka, and then he traveled in stages from Odesa to Khmelnytskyi and then finally to Lviv.

On 11 November 2022, following the liberation of Kherson, he attempted to return but was barred from entry while the city was cleared of mines and explosives. He officially returned to Kherson on 19 November 2022, and found the theatre completely looted, so he began to convert the theatre into a point of invincibility using international support. In February 2023, he testified before the International Court of Justice at The Hague in the Netherlands about his kidnapping and the occupation of Kherson.

== Personal life ==
He is married to a woman known as Oksana. They have five children. He used to live in the town of Oleshky until the Russian occupation of Kherson Oblast, when he then moved to Kherson following the liberation of Kherson and right-bank Kherson Oblast.

== Honours and awards ==
Knyha has been awarded the following:

- Honorary Award of the Ministry of Culture and Arts of Ukraine
- Mark Kropyvnytskyi Prize of the National Union of Theater Workers of Ukraine
- Badge "Excellence in Education of Ukraine"
- Honorary Citizen of Kherson, 2015.
- Order of Merit, III class, 2026.
