= Third Force (Myanmar) =

Political movement in Myanmar

The Third Force is an informal group name given to a collection of political parties and local non-governmental organisations operating inside Burma (also known as Myanmar). It was used mainly in relation with the 2010 general elections. Although campaigning for improvement of living conditions and for democratic change inside the country, the Third Force is seen as distinct from Aung San Suu Kyi and her National League for Democracy. The political parties participated in the November 2010 General elections while Aung San Suu Kyi's party called for a general boycott. Some state that the Third Force consists of liberal elements of the regime, more 'pragmatic' components of the opposition movement and a handful of local and foreign academics who advocated for a change in western policy of sanctions and isolation. The Third Force contains pro-democracy parties, ethnic minorities parties and locally established educational non-governmental organisations.

The name is derived from the argument that the members are distinct from the two main political camps inside the country, the Burmese military regime and the political movement centred on Aung San Suu Kyi. It is seen as campaigning for the similar goals of the more well known opposition but by adopting a less confrontational approach. Some have described it as neither pro-junta or pro-opposition.

== Components ==
Although not a formal grouping, a handful of political movements are identified as part of the Third Force.

- National Democratic Force, a break-away faction of Aung San Suu Kyi's National League for Democracy
- Democratic Party (Burma), formed by the daughters of eminent Burmese politicians in the 1950s such as U Nu, Kyaw Nyein and Ba Swe
- Shan Nationalities Democratic Party, largest ethnic minority party, representing the Shan minority
- Rakhine National Party, ethnic minority party, representing the Rakhine minority
- 88 Generation Student Group
- Myanmar Egress, an educational NGO which holds courses on elections, democracy and social movement. Denounced by detractors as a pro-government organisation.
- a collection of local and foreign academics, businessmen and activists

== Background ==
The country's political situation had changed little since the coup of 1988. The two major players of the political crisis, the military junta and the National League for Democracy, were perceived as too confrontational and adverse to co-operation, hindering any development to the country's political and economic scene. Most movements and political actors inside the country were simply grouped as either pro-government or of the NLD opposition.

However, Cyclone Nargis in 2008 was seen as a watershed for the local non-governmental scene, as youths became more interested in the affairs of the country, in light of failings by the government in the social sectors. As the military regime blocked international aid, local non governmental organisations sprouted to fill in the relief gap, mainly drawn from the youth and educated of the country's largest city, Yangon. These NGOs also stopped short of criticising the junta, deciding that it would only hinder relief operations.

Cyclone Nargis coincided with the junta's attempts to push through a constitution which had taken nearly fifteen years to complete. Although widely denounced as flawed to keep the military in power, opinions emerged commenting that change could be slowly achieved from within the Constitution's provisions. This was seen as a departure from the NLD's purportedly confrontational approach of immediate regime change.

A new political school emerged, calling for a new path in bringing about democracy yet by exploiting the clauses of the new constitution. Detractors however, perceive the Third Force as a charade by the military regime to imitate actual political change.

== 2010 general elections ==
The decision by the NLD to boycott the 2010 general elections marked a greater chasm between the Third force and the traditional Opposition. The Third Force parties opted to register and compete in the election, claiming that in due course, democratisation could be achieved from within the framework of the 2010 constitution. The 'Third Force' parties current control 20.23% of the elected Amyotha Hluttaw (House of Nationalities) or 34 representatives of the 224 chamber (of which 56 are directly appointed from the army) and 17.88% of the elected Pyithu Hluttaw (House of Representatives) or 59 representatives of the 440 chamber (of which 110 are directly appointed from the army).

== Stance ==
The Third Force is seen as occupying middle ground between the junta and the NLD, campaigning for change and democracy yet not confrontational. Detractors, mainly veteran politicians severely critical of the junta, regularly ridicule the activities of Third Force parties as misguided and naive or even as a front for the military junta.

Third Force components are seen as fundamentally different from the NLD in two aspects, mainly on the nature of participation in politics and on the statutory and non-statutory sanctions in place against the country. This stance has drawn flak from ardent supporters of Aung San Suu Kyi as lip service to democracy and that the Third Force is an attempt to create a new political elite.

The Third Force shares or draws its approaches from less vocal commentators of the Burmese political situation. Although not seen as supporters of the Third Force, a number of intellectuals and academics are seen as either sharing political views or influencing the policies of Third Force elements. These include Thant Myint-U, grandson of the third United Nations Secretary-General U Thant, Ma Thanegi - a pro-democracy activist and former close associate of Aung San Suu Kyi and a number of academics both local and foreign from Burmese and international institutions.

== Criticism ==
The Third Force and its supporters, especially the academics, are targets of criticism from more hardline pro-democracy activists and organisations. Their stance on engagement and sanctions have been denounced by certain prominent political players as "naive and stupid".

== See also ==
- 2010 Burmese general election
- List of political parties in Burma
- Aung San Suu Kyi
- National Unity Party (Burma)
- Politics of Burma
- Cyclone Nargis
