= Lviv State Choreographic School =

- Peter Doroshenko Street № 63; Lviv; Ukraine

Information
- School type: State
- Established: 1957
- Status: Active
- Specialist: Classical Ballet
- President: Sabolta Volodimir
- Age: 5 to 16
- Enrollment: 360
- Website: balletschool.lviv.name

Lviv State Choreographic School was established in August 1957 according to the initiative and assistance of regional department of culture and Ivan Franko Lviv National Academic Theatre of Opera and Ballet. This school with the length of studies of four years is the first and unique in all Western part of Ukraine.

== History ==
=== Studio 1947-1957 ===
In the post war period ballet troop of Opera House felt the shortage of stuff. That is why in 1947 with the help of the Executive Board of Lviv theatre, ballet studio was created. Alexander Yaroslavtsev, choreographer and ballet dancer, was the director.

=== 1957—1962 ===
Clavdia Vasina was the first headmistress of the choreographic school from August 1957 to August 1960. She had been working as ballet mistress in Lviv ballet troop. Along with her L’ubov Kulyk, piano teacher, was conducting the intake of students. 70 students were accepted.

Such choreographers as Elena Brandt, Alexandra Pecheniuk, L’udmila Orlovskaya, accompaniers Maya Lazebnik (Strel’tsova), Nikolay Sil’vestrov, piano teacher L’ubov Kulyk started their pedagogical career there.

From 1960 to 1962 Yevgeniya Shinkarenko was directing the school, later she moved to Moscow and was working as a choreographer in Moscow Choreographic Academy.

=== 1962—1973 ===
From 1962 to 1969 Galyna Abakunchyk was directing the school. It was during her period when school got the present premises in Doroshenko str. 63. Step be step the quantity of students enlarged to 100 along with the pedagogical stuff

From 1969 to 1973 the school was being governed by Klavdia Vasina once again.

=== 1973—1991 ===
From 1973 to 1991 (18 years) the school was under control of Maria Zama-Belova. Under her guidance the quantity of students rose from 100 to 300 and pedagogical stuff expanded from 20 to 40 teachers.

From 1974 new job position was added-director of studies. Nadezhda Kotyk has been working from many years on this position. Along with the Executive Board she improves the studying process and the school in general (equipment and reconstruction of classes).

This was the period of violent creative growth. New famous choreographers came to school: Ol’ha Startinevs’kaya, ballet dancers and soloists Ol’ha Samoylenko, Lev Blahoi, Sergey Astrems’kiy, Lidiya Zotova, Alla Serdtseva, Oksana Orliuta, L’ubov Luhovskaya. All of them were the students of first intakes of Lviv Ballet School.

Moreover, Petros Malkhasiants (Honored Artist of Ukraine), Mikhail Zaslavs’kiy (Honored Artist of Buriatiya), German Isupov (Honored Artist of Ukraine), Nina Pospelova, Sergey Naenko, Galina Klescheva should be mentioned.

During these years L’udmila Marina, a professional in musical and theatrical dramatic composition, produced annual school concerts.

Other notable pedagogues include these: Iryna Krasnogorova (Honored Artist of Ukraine), El’za Starikova (Honored Artist of Ukraine), Nina Balukhina, Nikolay Panasiuk, L’udmila Orlovskaya, Nelli Tovstanova, Valentina Kovalenko, Valentina Shevchenko, Galina Sakhnovskaya and some young teachers Nataliya Smut and Tatiana Rozdobud’ko. They collaborate with piano accompaniers: L’ubov Kulyk, L’udmila Yen’ko, Tatiyana Zhurikova, Adeliya Yatsena, Nina Guzikova, Alla Treplina, Ol’ha Yavorskaya, Lidiya Proniuk, Nona Tchekalenko, Svetlana Tikhonenko, Elena Nemira, Igor’ Tetel’baum, Adriana Masliak, Viktoriya Aliokhina, Oxana Kuidytch, Nina Mervins’ka, Oxana Syvokhyp, Galyna Stots’kaya, Valentina Tarchinets’, Svetlana Krupa, Iryna Kos, Nataliya Zykrytch, Alina Zhurikova. Together, they provide ballet and music learning for their students.

Since 1985 school has changed the mode of studies, which now last 7 years, not 5 as it was previously. Annually on the basis of school seminars for directors and headmasters of different choreographic groups are conducted. Curriculums and programmes for choreographic and musical disciplines were elaborated. Two departments were created of choreographic and theoretical disciplines.

The school was participating in different festivals-contests, where it took prize-winning places. So, in 1989 during the first contest-festival “The Festival of Children Dance” in Odesa the school became the laureate (choreographic composition “Carpathians”, music by Anatoliy Kos-Anatolsky, staging by Honored Artist of Ukraine P. Malkhasiants.

=== 1991—2000 ===
From 1991 to 2000 Ol’ha Kryvko was the director of school.

From 1993 the Ministry of Culture started to conduct the All-Ukrainian Children Contest of choreographic art “the Youth of Ballet”, which was held once in two years in Kyiv. Students of our school were taking part in this contest and became the diploma winners and laureates. Among them are-Yuliya Ushakova, Oleg Petryk, Khrystyna Tratch (Also the diploma winner of “Crystal Shoe”), Polina Kamkina, Elena Edel’shteyn, Anastasiya Gnatyshyn- N. Pospelova’s students, Elena Pavlova (teacher-Honored Artist of Ukraine O. Startinevskaya), Mariya Abashova- the diploma keeper of the contest “Fuete of Arteck-1998” (teacher-Honored Artist of Ukraine Krasnogorova- Malhasiants) and many others.

=== 2000 — ===
Since 2000 with 260 students and teachers staff of 49 people Volodymyr Sabolta directs the school. Thanks to him school is transformed into the cultural institution as legislative structure, converted to the independent balance. School gets the status of Lviv State Choreographic School, which is confirmed by the decision of executive board of Lviv City Council.

The headmaster started to improve the studying process, made a great work as to the age limit of students in the class, facilities and the aesthetic design in the classrooms. New tradition appeared-annual concerts dedicated to St. Nicolas Day.

In 2006 the first youth ballet contest of classical choreography “Galyts’ka Terpsykhora 2006” was held. Strong partnership is organized between the Executive Board of S. Krushel’nyts’ka Lviv National Academic Theatre, where 60% of ballet troop are former students of Lviv State Ballet School and our concerts (performance reports) dedicated to St. Nicolas Day are included into the repertoire of the theatre.

Students of senior classes take part in such performances of the theater as: Swan Lake, Creation of the World, Reappearance of Butterfly, Bayadere, Coppelia etc. Student of out school always take part in different contests and festivals, e.g. : “Pearls of Odesa”, “Dance Without Borders” (Kyiv), “Crystal Shoe” (Kharkiv) and others, were they become diploma winners and laureates.

In 2004 on the basis school a new preparatory department was opened with the aim of improvement of students’ intake quality. Students actively take part in the festive affairs of Lviv and Lviv region.

== Program of Studies ==
In preparatory groups boys and girls are taken in the age of 5–8 years. Specially for children a new general system of education was created called “Child of the Future”, where dance, gymnastics, music, lessons of art, participation in concert programs, preparation to the school are included.

The intake to the first form is held from the age of 9.

Subjects:

Classical dance

Folk Dance

Modern choreography

Gymnastics

Historical dance

Duett dance

History of ballet

Acting skills

Piano lessons

Theory of music

== Galyts’ka Terpsykhora ==
International Youth Contest of Classical Choreography Galyts’ka Terpsykhora was lounged in 2006, became traditional (took lace in 2006, 2008, 2010)

== Children’s Theater of Ballet ==
In 2011 Children’s Theatre of Ballet was created on the basis of the school

“Mykyta, the sly Fox”- the premier of the performance on the music of I. Vymmer, choreography by Honored Artist of Ukraine S. Naenko took place on May 29, 2011.

“Cavalry Halt ”- the premier took place on January 11, 2012. Music by Armsgamer, choreography by M. Petipa, ballet-master N. Sanzharevskyy.

“Seasons of the Year”- the premier took place on May 26, 2012, music by A. Glaznov, choreography by Honored Artist of Ukraine S. Naenko.

In October 2013, successfully conducted touring Children's Ballet Theatre of Lviv in Slovenia.

== Pedagogical Staff ==
Director of Studies

Kotyk N.

Head of Choreographic Department

Orlovskaya L.

Ballet-masters

Naenko S., Sanzharevskyy N

Pedagogues-choreographers

Orlovskaya L., Naenko S., Starikova E., Tovstanova N., Klescheva G., Barer O., Mordzik C., Sanzharevskyy N., Smut N., Sudomliak V., Serdtseva A.

Famous graduates:

Khrystyna Tratch, Oleg Petryk, Yevgeniy Svetlitsa, Anastasiya Isupova, Viktoriya Tkatch, Yuliya Yermolenko, Nikolay Sanszharevskyy.

== Cooperation with Lviv National Academic Theatre of Opera and Ballet ==
Close cooperation was established with the board of Lviv National Academic Theatre of Opera and Ballet, where students participate in such performances as: Creation of the world, Recurrence of Butterfly, Bayadere, Copelia etc.
