= Lyudmyla Milyayeva =

- Людмила Міляєва
- Born: Lyudmyla Semenivna Milyayeva; 13 November 1925; Kharkiv, Ukrainian SSR, Soviet Union
- Died: 29 October 2022 (aged 96); Kyiv, Ukraine
- Occupations: Art historian; University teacher
- Awards: Merited Artist of Ukraine; Order of Merit, Third Class; Order of Princess Olga, Third Class

Lyudmyla Semenivna Milyayeva (Ukrainian: Людмила Семенівна Міляєва; 13 November 1925 – 29 October 2022) was a Ukrainian art historian and university teacher. She was a research fellow from 1949 to 1962 and was the head of the department of pre-rev. of art of the Kyiv State Museum of Ukrainian Fine Arts (today the National Art Museum of Ukraine) between 1964 and 1966. Milyayeva worked as a senior lecturer, then an associate professor and finally a professor of the Department of History and Theory of Art at the National Academy of Visual Arts and Architecture. She was the author or co-author of more than 200 scientific works. Milyayeva was the recipient of the Merited Artist of Ukraine, the Order of Merit, Third Class and the Order of Princess Olga, Third Class.

== Early life and education ==
Milyayeva was born on a street in Kharkiv, Ukraine on 13 November 1925. Her father was the Jewish artist Semyon Matveyevich Milyaev from Vilnius, and her mother was the surgical nurse Irina Fedorovna Milyaeva. Milyayeva was an only child and survived the Holodomor famine that lasted from 1932 to 1933. She was first educated at a German school that ran to Froebel principles. Milyayeva enrolled at the Taras Shevchenko National University of Kyiv, Institute of Philology to study a degree in Russian Philology and was tutored under the supervision of Vasyl Maslov. Her candidate's thesis was on Wall Painting of Potelych and the doctorate thesis was on Drohobych Paintings and Problems of the Development of Ukrainian Art of the 16th - Early 18th Centuries. Milyayeva graduated in 1950 and received a Doctor of Art History in 1988.

== Career ==
Between 1949 and 1962, she was a research fellow after applying for the job before she completed her university diploma. Milyayeva served as the head of the department of pre-rev. of art of the Kyiv State Museum of Ukrainian Fine Arts (today the National Art Museum of Ukraine) from 1964 to 1966. She began working at the National Academy of Visual Arts and Architecture in 1962. Milyayeva was firstly a senior lecturer, then an associate professor and finally a professor of the Department of History and Theory of Art from 1990. She established her own courses on the history of Ukrainian art in the 19th and 20th centuries, the history of Ukrainian art between the 10th and 18th centuries and ancient Russian art. Milyayeva introduced some scientific papers into circulation such as St. George with Life (late 11th — early 12th centuries), Intercession of the Virgin (late 12th — early 13th centuries) and Volyn Virgin (late 13th — early 14th centuries). She was the author of the chapters "Ease Painting" in the book History of Ukrainian Art (volume 1 in 1967), Art of the Peoples of the USSR - Art of Ukraine (painting, sculpture, graphics) 16th–17th centuries (volume 3 in 1974) and Art of Ukraine (painting, graphics) 17th–18th centuries (volume 4 in 1976), article The Church of the Transfiguration and the poetics of Ukrainian Baroque in the album Sorochyn Iconostasis: Iconostasis of the Transfiguration Church in the village of Velyky Sorochyntsi, Myrhorod district, Poltava region (2010).

She authored or co-authored more than 200 scientific works, including works on the history of Ukrainian fine arts, with such subjects as research into the history of icon painting in Ukrainian fine art. This included the books K.O. Trutovsky (1955), Potelich's Paintings (1969; 1971 - Russian), Ukrainian Art of the 14th - First Half of the 17th Centuru (1963, co-author), Ukrainian Medieval Painting (co-author in 1976), The Ukrainian Icon 11th-18th Centuries. From Byzantium to Baroque (1996; English, German, French); Ease Painting (book History of Ukrainian Art, co-authored volume 1 in 1966), Ukrainian Art of the Late 13th - First Half of the 18th Century, Ukrainian Art of the First Half of the 17th-18th Century (book History of the Art of the Peoples of the USSR, volume 3 in 1974 and later volume 4 in 1976).

Other works included The Transfiguration Church of the Savior in the Village of Velikiye Sorochintsy, Poltava Region // Western European Baroque and the Byzantine World: Collection of the Scientific Society of the Academy of Sciences. Belgrade in 1991, Iconography and Eloquence of the Ukrainian Baroque (Painting of the Gate Church of the Kiev-Pechersk Monastery) // Eastern Christian Temple. Liturgy and Art in 1994; Miraculous Icons of the Mother of God in Kiev of the 17th Century and the Image of the Mother of God of Lyubet by Ivan Shchyrsky // Zap. NTSH: Pr. Sections of Art History in 1994; Ukrainian icon of the 11th-18th centuries. from Byzantine origins to Baroque in 1996 and 1997; Le icone XII — all XVII secolo. Dalle fonti Byzantine al Baroco in 1997; The Icon of Saint George, with Scene of his life from the Town of Mariupol. Perceptions of Byzatium and its Neighbors in 2000; co-authored Ukrainian icons of the XI–XVIII centuries in 2007; Paintings of the octagon of the church of St. George in the city of Drohobych in 2010; S. P. Podervyansky. Creativity and fate. 1916–2006 in 2011 and Memories of L.S. Milyaeva, Semen Matveevich Milyaev in 2014.

== Personal life ==
She was married to the arist Sergey Podervyansky until his death in 2006. They were the parents of the artist, playwright and poet Les Podervianskyi. Milyayeva died in Kyiv on 29 October 2022.

== Recognition ==
She was made an Merited Artist of Ukraine in 1992 and became an active full member of the National Academy of Arts of Ukraine in 2000. Milyayeva received the Gold Medal of the National Academy of Arts in 2005 and was awarded the Order of Merit, Third Class in 2012. In 2017, she was awarded the Order of Princess Olga, Third Class. Milyayeva was a member of the National Union of Artists of Ukraine from 1952 onwards. A collection of memoirs about her, Academician Lyudmila Milyayeva: Life in Art, was published in 2023.
