= Natalia Buchynska =

Ukrainian singer (born 1977)

Natalia Buchynska Наталія Бучинська
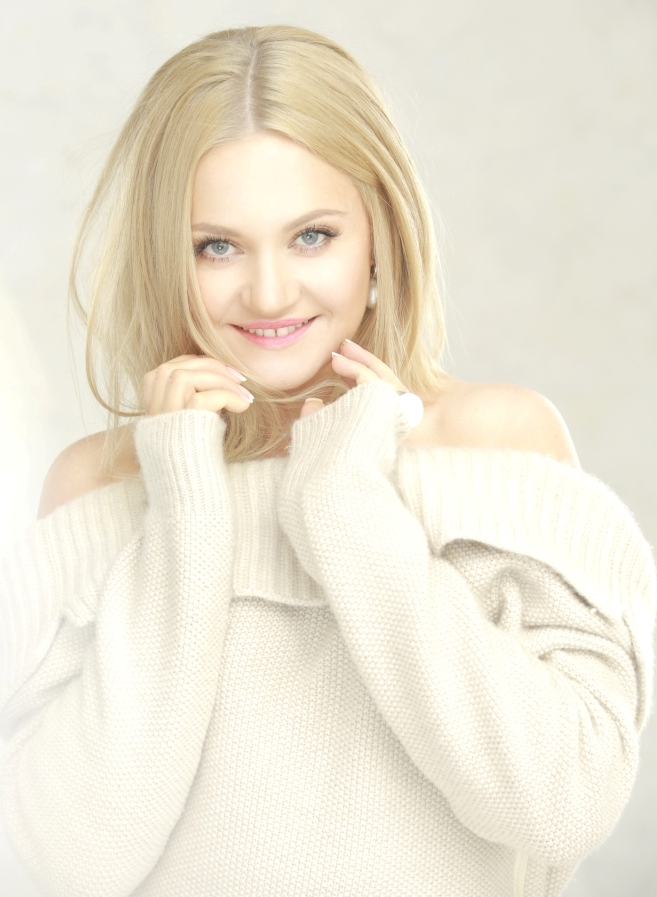
- Buchynska in 2014

Background information
- Born: 28 April 1977 (age 49)
- Origin: Lviv, Ukrainian SSR, Soviet Union
- Genres: Pop; pop rock; pop folk; world music; etno
- Occupations: Singer; TV presenter
- Instruments: Voice; piano
- Years active: 1995–present
- Labels: Artur Music, Moon Records
- Website: www.buchynska.com

Natalia Lyubomyrivna Buchynska (Ukrainian: Наталія Любомирівна Бучинська; born 28 April 1977) is a Ukrainian singer.

== Early life and education ==
Natalia Buchynska was born on 28 April 1977 in Lviv, Ukrainian SSR, Soviet Union (now Ukraine). Her father was a dentist and mother worked as a commodity specialist. Although her parents were not musicians, they loved music and enjoyed singing at home, which was the reason she loved music and the Ukrainian song.

In her childhood her first performances were for family and friends at home. At five years old, the family moved to Ternopil. She sang in the school choir, and attended voice lessons three times a week, developing her talent at an early age. Through the eleventh grade, she participated in an artistic group, which performed at the Ternopil Cultural Center, "Berezil". She graduated from the Ivan Franko Ternopil high school in 1994.

Buchynska wanted to pursue a musical career, but completing her education and performing were not possible in Ternopil.

She entered the Ternopil Academy of National Economy, now the National Economic University, specializing in audit and control, graduating in 1998. In 2003, she graduated from the National Academy of Internal Affairs of Ukraine. In 2005, she completed her studies at the Kyiv National University of Culture and Arts as an Artistic Director.

== Musical career ==
In her first year at the university, Buchynska took part in many vocal competitions and musical festivals. In 1995, she won first prize in the contest "Miss Academy", and in February of that year finished first in the "Chervona Ruta" (Red Rue) Festival.

Buchynska, participated in many festivals, including "Young Halychyna", "Spivanochka – Jazzochka" (Song – dzhazochka), "Song will be among us", "Melody", "Song Vernissage", "Doliy" (Predestination) and was winner of "Song of the Year" from 1995 to 1998.

In 1998 she moved to Kyiv, at the request of the State Song and Dance Ensemble of the Ministry of Internal Affairs of Ukraine. After auditioning, she was chosen as a soloist. There she met her future director and producer Leonid Radchenko. In this same year, her song "Listen, the rustling rain" became "Song of the Year".

In 2004 Buchynska became the youngest People's Artist of Ukraine. She performed at over 800 concerts. Her repertoire includes over 160 songs. She performs songs in Ukrainian, Russian, Armenian, English and French. Her songs are mainly written by Nicolo Petrasha, Yuri Rybchynsky, Ruslan Quinta, Vladimir Matetskiy, Volodymyr Melnykov and others.

== Personal life ==
In 2001 she married a serviceman, Oleksander Yakushev, and in 2002 gave birth to a baby girl, Kateryna.

As a soloist in a musical ensemble, Buchynska was awarded a special rank of Lieutenant of Internal Service. She took an oath of allegiance to the Ukrainian people, and in 2004 she graduated from the Kyiv Academy of Internal Affairs with a rank Police Major.

== Discography ==
- That Which Words Can't Say
- Girl – Spring, in 2004
- Soul, in 2008
- Evening of Love, in 2011.

== Single ==
- Natalia Buchynska & Gennadiy Viter "Without you"

== Videography ==
- "Forgive-farewell"
- "My Ukraine" – 2003
- "Victory" – 2004
- "Oath to Ukraine" – 2004
- "For a law enforcement officer friend" - 2004
- "Girl – Spring" – 2004
- "Sinful Love" – 2005
- "The first love" – 2006
- "Soul" – 2007
- "Just..." – 2008
- "The Best friend" – 2011
- "Last Love" – 2012
- "All for You" – 2013
- "Give champagne" – 2013

== Social media ==
- Official website of Natalіa Buchynska
- Natalіa Buchynska @Facebook
- Natalіa Buchynska @SoundCloud
- Natalіa Buchynska @iTunes
- Natalіa Buchynska @Instagram
- Natalіa Buchynska @VKonate
- Natalіa Buchynska @Google Plus
- Natalіa Buchynska @YouTube
