= Third Force (Ukraine) =

Ukrainian political party founded in 2005

Political Party "Third Force" (Ukrainian: Політична партія «Третя сила») is a political party in Ukraine that was created in 2005 by Vasyl Havryliuk.
