= Kyiv National University of Culture and Arts =

Public university in Kyiv, Ukraine

Coordinates: 50.4247°N 30.5344°E

- Київський Національний Університет Культури і Мистецтв
- University emblem
- Motto: Жити, Любити, Творити, Перемагати.
- Type: National public university
- Established: 1968
- Accreditation: Ministry of Education and Science of Ukraine
- President: Mykhailo Poplavskyi
- Rector: I. Bondar
- Students: 2500
- Doctoral students: 140
- Location: Kyiv, Ukraine
- Language: Ukrainian
- Website: www.knukim.edu.ua
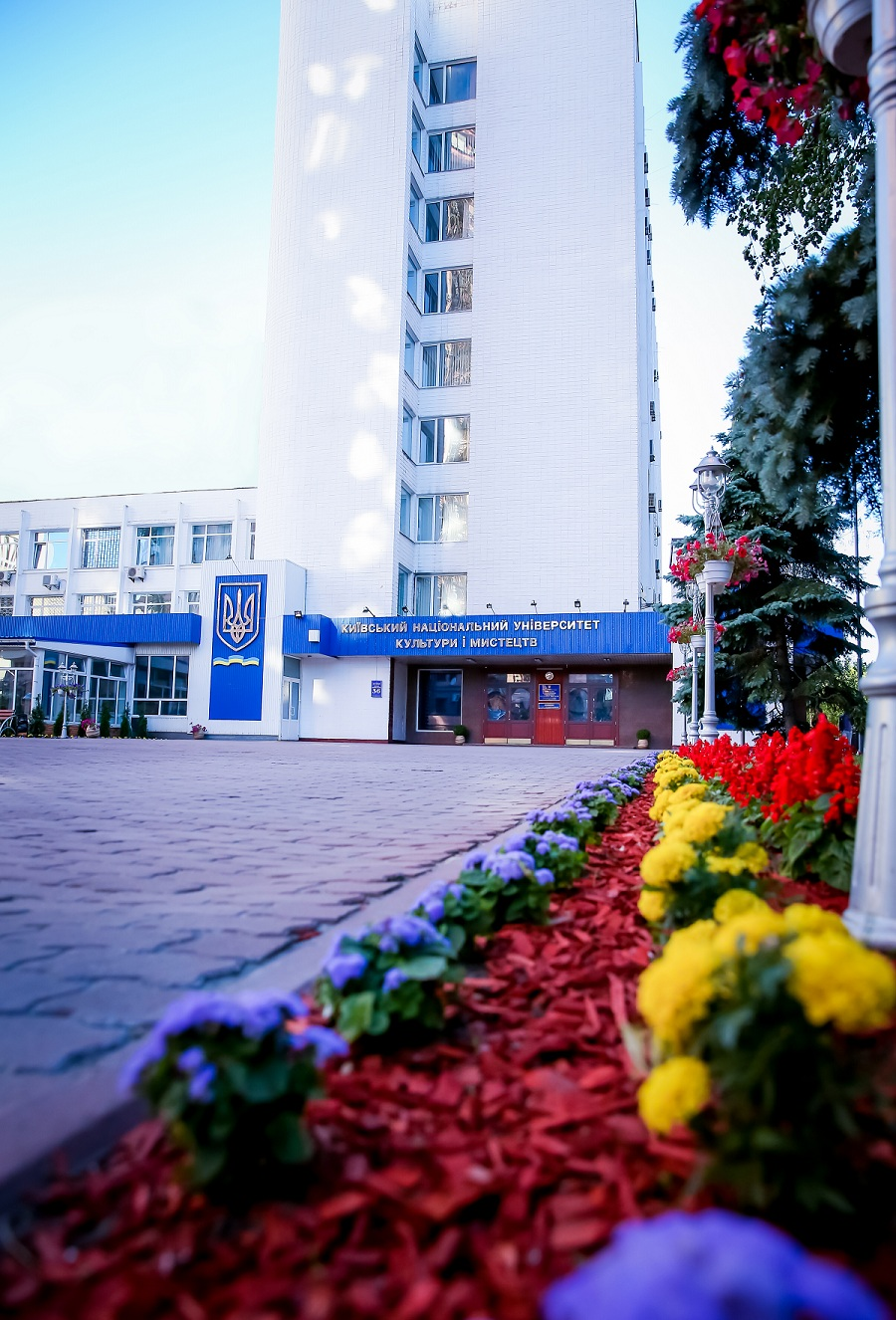

The Kyiv National University of Culture and Arts (abbr. KNUCA, Ukrainian: Київський національний університет культури і мистецтв, romanized: Kyïvskyĭ natsionalnyĭ universytet kultury i mystetstv) is a university in Kyiv, Ukraine with the highest level of accreditation.

== History ==
In 1968 in accordance with the Resolution of the Council of Ministers of the USSR No. 608 from August 8, 1968, in and decision of the Council of Ministers of the USSR No. 459 from August 28, 1968, the Kyiv State Institute of culture of Korniychuk was founded only with the "Cultural educational", "Librarian" faculties and the faculty of "Social professions".

In the early 1990s, political and social processes that have affected the whole country began. Especially actively responded to these events the young people, who were looking forward for the changes and innovations. A wave of student demands of national-democratic character raised in KSIC. Students required to raise the blue-yellow flag and discontinue teaching of the Soviet ideological subjects. The institute has formed a branch of Ukrainian Student Union, and a Society of the Ukrainian language of Taras Shevchenko was founded.

April 21, 1993, by the order of the Minister of Culture of Ukraine Ivan Dziuba, professor Mykhailo Poplavskyi was assigned to the post of the rector of the Kyiv State Institute of Culture and Arts as the informal leader of the student body, from which the new stage in the history of KSIC began.

By the year 1996 the new rector has gathered highly qualified teaching staff, has developed and put into practice a number of alternative financing. The Institute had made the first commercial kits, created a modern material and technical basis for the educational process, updated the curriculum and methodological support, open new specialities and relative faculties, created the faculty of preliminary training and new subdivisions.

In 1997, according to the concept of "prospective development", developed by Snitko the "Jurisprudence", "Ethnocultural", "Computer Technology", "Sociology" faculties were opened, and also the first in Ukraine Institute of Film and Television for the preparation of the directors and operators of television, sound, television broadcasters and leading, of photographers, advertisers, directors of animated films and TV journalists.

November 11, 1997 the Cabinet of Ministers granted the status of Kyiv State University of Culture and Arts to the KSIC. This involved, among other things, the deployment of training programs of the teaching staff, not only through graduate school, but doctorate. The first doctoral specialities "Bibliology and Libraryology" in Ukraine, "Social pedagogy", "Method of musical education" were opened. In 1999 President of Ukraine granted the status "National".

== Art groups ==
- Academic Choir "ANIMA", headed by Natalia Krechko
- Pavluchenko Ukrainian Folk Choir, headed by Olena Skoptsova
- Folk ensemble "Kralytsia", headed by Ivan Sinelnikov

== Notable alumni ==
- DakhaBrakha members Olena Tsybulska, Iryna Kovalenko, Nina Garenetska, who won Shevchenko prize in 2020.
- Inna Dorofeieva, ballerina
- Petro Gadz, entrepreneur and politician
- Susanna Karpenko, composer and folk singer
- Oleksandr Knyha, theatre director
- Kateryna Pavlenko, the leader of Go A band represented Ukraine in Eurovision 2021.
- Mykhailo Poplavskyi, afterwards - the rector of the university.
- Victoria Vasalatiy, singer-songwriter

== See also ==
List of universities in Ukraine
