= Honored Artist of Ukraine =

Honorary title of Ukraine

Honored Artist of Ukraine Заслужений артист України
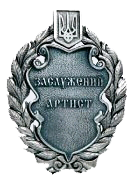
- Honored Artist of Ukraine badge

Awarded by President of Ukraine
- Type: Order of merit
- Eligibility: Ukrainian and foreign citizens
- Awarded for: Outstanding achievement in the performing arts
- Status: Currently constituted

Precedence
- Next (higher): People's Artist of Ukraine

Honored Artist of Ukraine (Ukrainian: Заслужений артист України, romanized: Zasluzhenyi artyst Ukrainy; also translated as Honored (Performing) Artist of Ukraine or Merited (Performing) Artist of Ukraine) is a state honorary title of decoration of the Ukrainian government. Originally awarded by the Ukrainian SSR, the award continued after Ukraine regained independence, recognizing outstanding achievement in the performing arts. The Law of Ukraine regulates it Regarding the State Awards of Ukraine (#1549-14).

== Definition ==
The title is the state award of Ukraine that is given for personal merit by the State of Ukraine to citizens who have worked in their respective economic or socio-cultural fields as a rule for no less than ten (10) years, obtaining high on-the-job achievements and professional mastery.

== Conditions ==
The title is awarded by the President of Ukraine. It is given to citizens of Ukraine, foreigners, and persons with no citizenship. This title is lower than the People's Artist of Ukraine which can only be awarded ten (10) years after obtaining this award. This title is not awarded posthumously. All recipients must have completed Tertiary studies.

This award can be given to motion picture directors; actors of theatres, films, and circus; singers; members of professional ensembles and chorus'; orchestral conductors; composers; musicians; TV and Radio network broadcasters.

The recipients are awarded a badge (40 mm high x 30 mm wide, made of silver) and a certificate. The presentation must be conducted publicly.

== Recipients ==
- Lidiya Belozyorova, stage and screen actress
- Rostyslav Derzhypilsky (2007), theater director and actor
- Nina Herasymova-Persydska, musicologist
- Stepan Hiha, composer and singer
- Iryna Horoshko, choreographer and dancer
- Tina Karol, singer
- Raisa Kyrychenko, singer
- Nadiya Kudelia, singer
- Alla Kudlai, singer
- Ani Lorak, singer
- Lyudmyla Milyayeva, art historian and university teacher.
- Sergei Polusmiak, musician
- Viktor Zhdanov, actor
- Oleksandr Ponomaryov, singer
- Oles Sanin (2014), Film director, producer, screenwriter
- Oleksandr Semchuk
- Oksana Shvets, actress (1996)
- Georgy Deliev, actor and musician (2002)
- Oleksandr Stoyanov (2016), ballet artist (Note: Transliteration note for spelling. First name of ballet artist also spelled as Alexander. Last name also spelled as Stoianov.)
- Evgeniy Svetlitsa, ballet artist
- Victoria Vasalatiy (2020)
- Oksana Cherkashyna, actress (2021)

== See also ==
- People's Artist of the USSR
- People's Artist of Ukraine
- Merited Artist (disambiguation)
- List of European art awards
