= Rock music in Ukraine =

Ukrainian rock (Ukrainian: Український рок, romanized: Ukrayinsʹkyy rok) is rock music from Ukraine.

Ukrainian contemporary music, including rock, emerged from the VIA music scene of the 1970s and 1980s. This controlled form of music, was a response to the Rock and roll infiltrating from the outside of the Ukrainian Soviet Socialist Republic. An important role in the popularization of rock music in Ukraine was played by the Chervona Ruta music festival.

The most popular modern Ukrainian bands include BoomBox, Braty Hadiukiny, Druha Rika, Haydamaky, Komu Vnyz, Lama, Mad Heads XL, Mandry, Mertvyi Piven, Okean Elzy, Plach Yeremiyi, S.K.A.Y., Taras Petrynenko, Tartak, TNMK, Viy, Vopli Vidoplyasova and others. Famous Ukrainian heavy metal bands include Fleshgore, Firelake, Nokturnal Mortum, Astrofaes, Drudkh, and Hate Forest. Metal Heads Mission is the biggest metal festival in Ukraine and ex-USSR countries.

== History ==
=== Beginnings ===
The history of rock music in Ukraine started in the second half of the 1950s with the spread of beat music among the youth in countries which were then part of the Soviet Union. This process resulted in the emergence of VIA youth collectives, which were a form of compromise between the official ban on "bourgeois" Western music by Soviet authorities and increased demand for modern entertainment during the Khrushchev Thaw era.

Government pressure and frequent bans forced many musicians of that era to perform underground, and the Iron Curtain combined with censorship limited the possibilities of bands to adopt new musical styles. As a result, musical compositions tended to be eclectic and used elements of different styles in a selective manner. VIA songs lacked the traditional protest elements, and their topics were limited to lyrical and romantic images. At the same time, close connections with bard music, as well as the wish of young performers to underline their national identity, led to the integration of folkloric motives into Ukrainian rock music, which showed parallels to the folk revival trends in the West.

=== 1960s ===
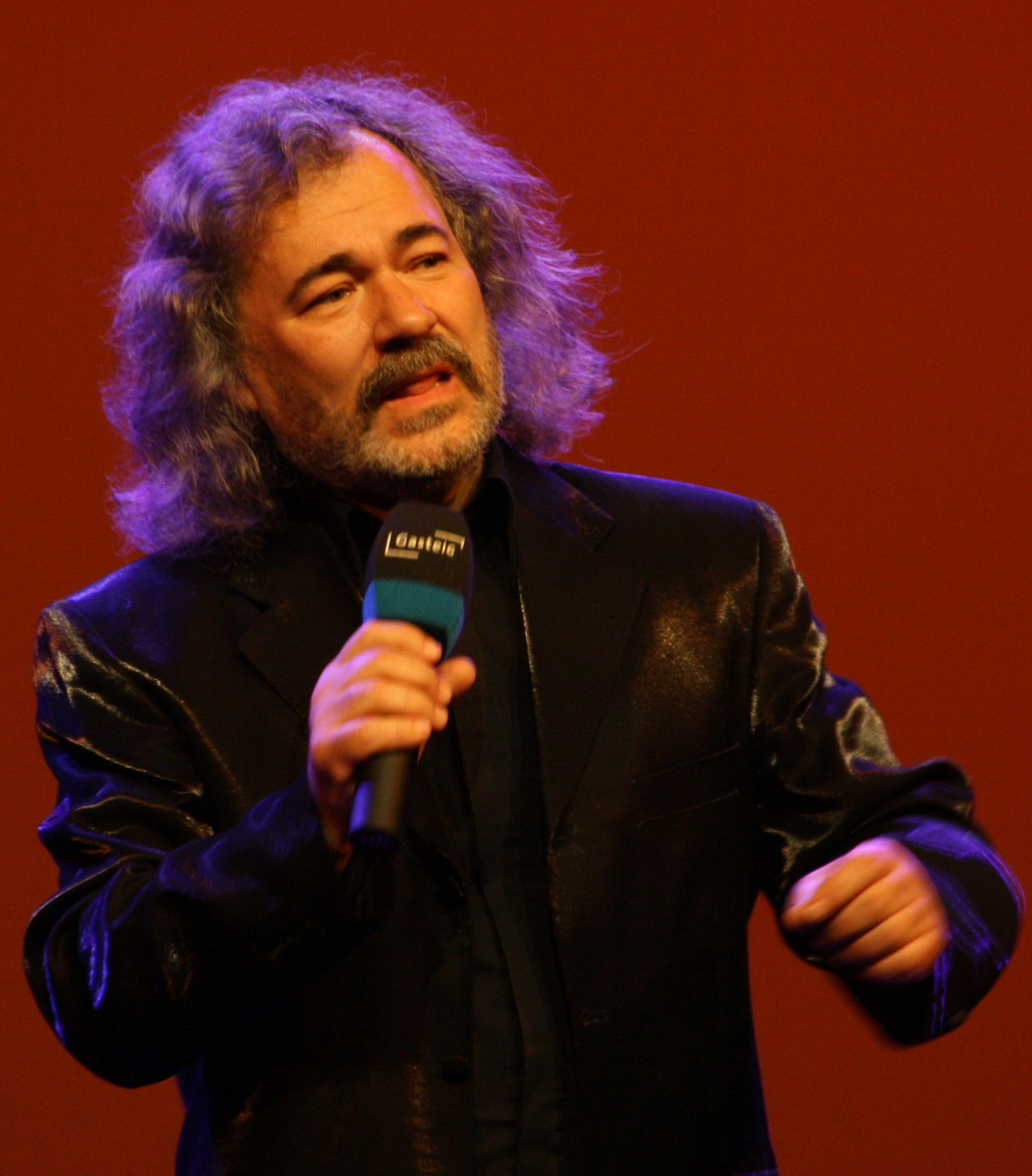
Ukrainian musician Taras Petrynenko, one of the founders of Eney

Among the first music collectives to perform modern popular music in Ukrainian language were bands such as Berezen', Dzvony, Druhe Dykhannia, Chervoni Dyiavoliata (all from Kyiv), Lysy, Prometey, Bliky (all from Lviv), Hutsuly (Kosiv). They usually identified their musical style as "beat", which in the Soviet Union became synonymous with rock'n'roll. Many Ukrainian bands of that time used folk instruments such as sopilka, tsymbaly and bandura, adopting elements of folk and jazz rock. During the 1960s and 1970s several popular Ukrainian bands developed a cult following, most prominently Levko Dutkivskiy's Smerichka, as well as Kobza, Eney, Chervona Ruta, Vatra (Ukrainian band) and Svitiaz (band).

On 1 January 1966, Ukraine's first beat music festival took place in Kharkiv. In the same year Serhiy Korotkov started publishing a samizdat magazine called Beat-Echo, which became the first Ukrainian publication dedicated to rock'n'roll music. In 1967 around 30 bands took part in a beat music festival in Kyiv, and next year the city's Central Post Office became the venue of the first all-Union big beat contest, which involved performers from Kyiv, Lviv and Kharkiv, as well as guests from other parts of the USSR. However, after the Soviet invasion of Czechoslovakia authorities started a wave of repressions against those musical collectives whom they deemed to be too free-minded. During that time television and press were used by the state to create an image of rock musicians as "wreckers" and to depict their music as dangerous. Numerous musicians were blacklisted and not allowed to perform anymore.

=== 1970s ===
After the government crackdown on big beat collectives, early 1970s saw the rise of the new type of musical bands known as VIA (vocal-instrumental ensemble). Unlike their predecessors, they were required to get an official registration from authorities and performed at philharmonic halls, palaces of culture or factories. Their repertoire was limited, as their compositions usually had to be created by professional musicians and poets who were members of the Union of Composers and Writers' Union of Ukrainian SSR. The outward appearance of performers was also strictly regulated: their clothes had to be formal, including elements of folk clothing, military uniform etc., and all members of a band had to be dressed in the same style; moving around the scene during performance was not approved. On the other hand, unlike the earlier beat collectives, which frequently had to improvise in order to obtain musical instruments, members of VIA bands were provided with professional quality equipment. Despite government censorship, Ukrainian performers of that era managed to introduce fashionable Western trends of that time to their audience, using elements of styles such as funk and fusion, and their compositions preserved a distinct Ukrainian identity.

During the 1970s, one of the centres of artistic resistance to the Soviet regime in Ukraine was Lviv. This made rock music popular among the local youth and led to the creation of the hard rock band Super Vujky. The idea to create the band first appeared in 1974 and next year it started its performances, which became popular among Lviv's hippies. Super Vujky's original members were three local musicians and an immigrant from Argentina, and throughout their existence only one of their performers was a professional musician. The band initially performed covers on the songs of popular Western bands, most of them from Great Britain, such as Focus, Rainbow, Deep Purple, Led Zeppelin, Nazareth etc. Later the band also created a number of their own original compositions. Due to increasing pressure of the Communist government, in 1981 Super Vujky were forced to cease their performances. However, the band eventually reunited 30 years later and in 2014 issued its first album.

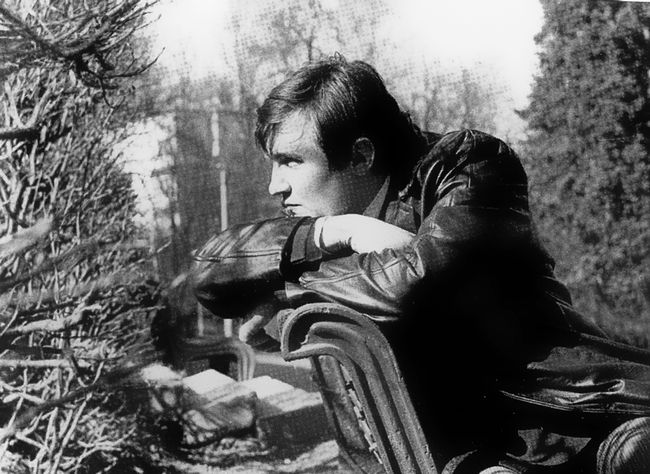
Volodymyr Ivasiuk, one of the defining figures in the history of Ukrainian VIA music

In the environment where one-band performances were increasingly being banned by authorities, an especially important role in the promotion of popular music in the Soviet Union was played by festivals, both local and all-Union ones. In 1971 and 1972 "Chervona Ruta" and "Vodohray", two songs written by Ukrainian songwriter and composer Volodymyr Ivasiuk, became the winners of the Pesnya goda music television festival in Moscow. As a result, Ivasiuk, a medical doctor by profession, became a star not only in Ukraine, but around the whole USSR. This met strong opposition from both officials, who were bothered by the national motifs presented in his songs, and professional composers, who were envious of his success. The campaign of pressure against Ivasiuk ended with his death in 1979, which took place under suspicious circumstances. The composer's funeral turned into a demonstration of defiance against Soviet authorities, and many of its participants were later questioned by the KGB. The death of Ivasiuk coincided with the general decrease of VIA's popularity. The emergence of electronic music, disco, new wave and soft rock forced many musical bands to dissolve or to change their formats.

=== 1980s ===
A partial relaxation of government pressure against rock music in the USSR took place in the period immediately before the 1980 Summer Olympics in Moscow, as Soviet authorities attempted to create an illusion of cultural freedom in the country in order to attract foreign visitors. One of the important musical events during that time was the Tbilisi Rock Festival (1980). However, starting from 1983 a new wave of persecution against rock musicians began, aiming to disrupt performances by underground bands. In the following years show trials against musicians who performed unofficially became a norm in the Soviet Union. Only with the beginning of Gorbachev's perestroika in 1985 did the pressure start to decrease.

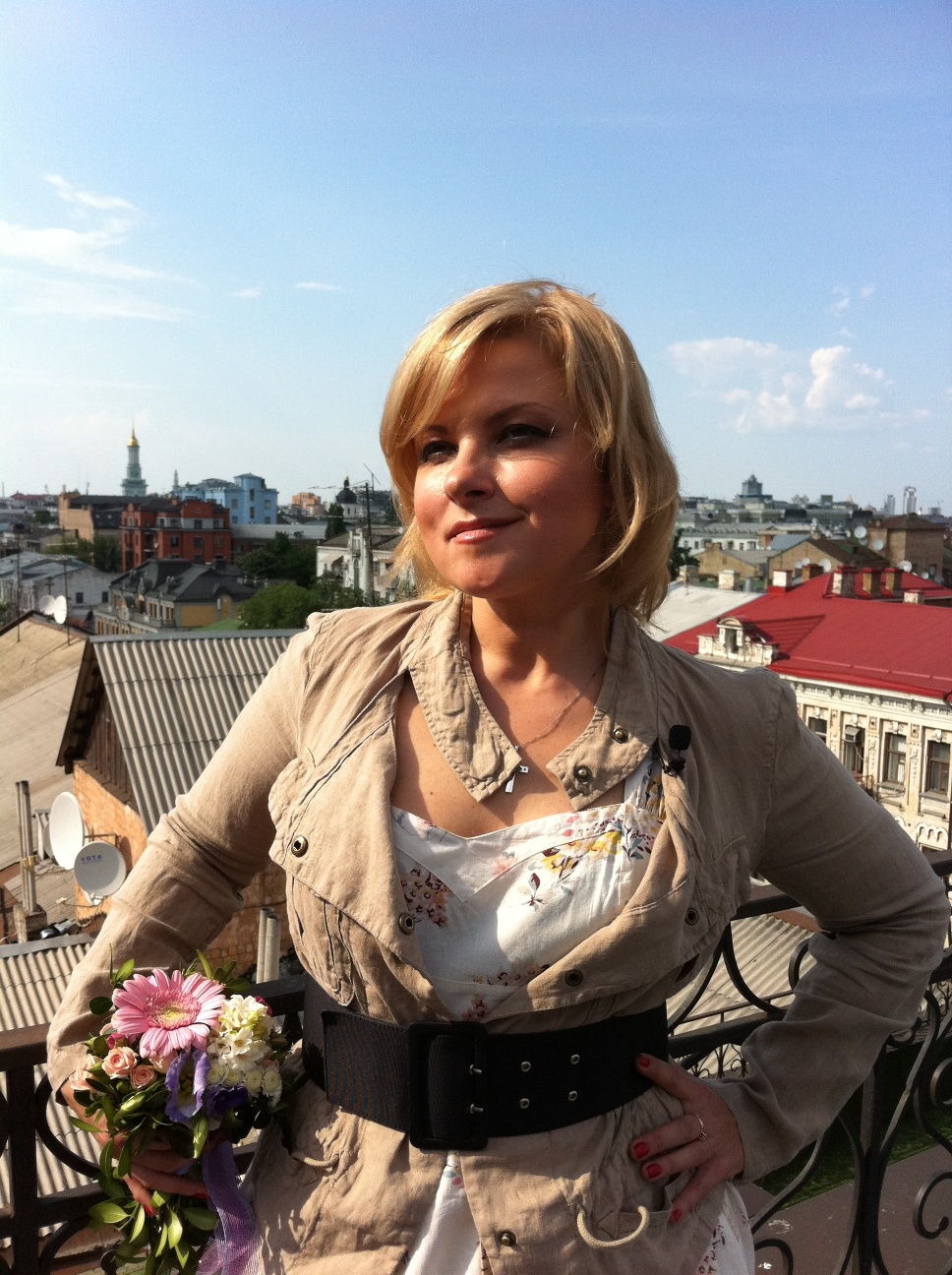
Maria Burmaka, one of the group of Ukrainian rock musicians who first became prominent at the Chervona Ruta festival in 1989

The rise of rock music in Ukraine in the middle 1980s was inspired by the doctrinals of glasnost and uskoreniye. During that period, Ukrainian rock developed under the influence of punk, post-punk and alternative rock and adopted protest elements covertly directed against the Soviet system. Compositions of notable Ukrainian performers of the new generation, among them Viktor Morozov, Eduard Drach, Maria Burmaka, Sestrychka Vika, Braty Hadiukiny and Komu Vnyz, were influenced by counterculture genres including punk and metal. In 1986 Ukraine's first official rock club "Kuznia" was created in Kyiv; later similar spaces appeared in other cities, including Kharkiv, Lviv and Odesa. Rock clubs allowed local bands to openly perform, rehearse and use quality equipment, and also promoted contacts, discussions and exchange of experiences between musicians from different collectives. Many independent rock bands appeared in Ukraine during that time, with most prominent of them being Edem, Kvartyra 50, Kollezhskiy Asessor and Vopli Vidopliassova.

During 1986-1987, a number of rock concerts were held in Kyiv, and their participants' songs were even advertised in the local press. In 1988 the capital also housed Ukraine's first international rock festival, which involved bands from the Soviet Union, Poland, Hungary and the Netherlands. In 1987-1990, rock festivals also took place in Donetsk, Lutsk, Simferopol, Dniprodzerzhynsk and Berdiansk. In Lviv the first officially sanctioned rock concert was organized in January 1988. The most prominent event which influenced the development of Ukrainian rock and Ukrainian music in general was the Chervona Ruta music festival, dedicated to the memory of Volodymyr Ivasiuk and held for the first time in Chernivtsi in 1989 with the participation of exclusively Ukrainophone performers. Among the 30 participants of the festival's rock section were Vopli Vidopliassova, Komy Vnyz, Braty Hadiukiny, Zymovyi Sad, Sestrychka Vika.

=== 1990s ===
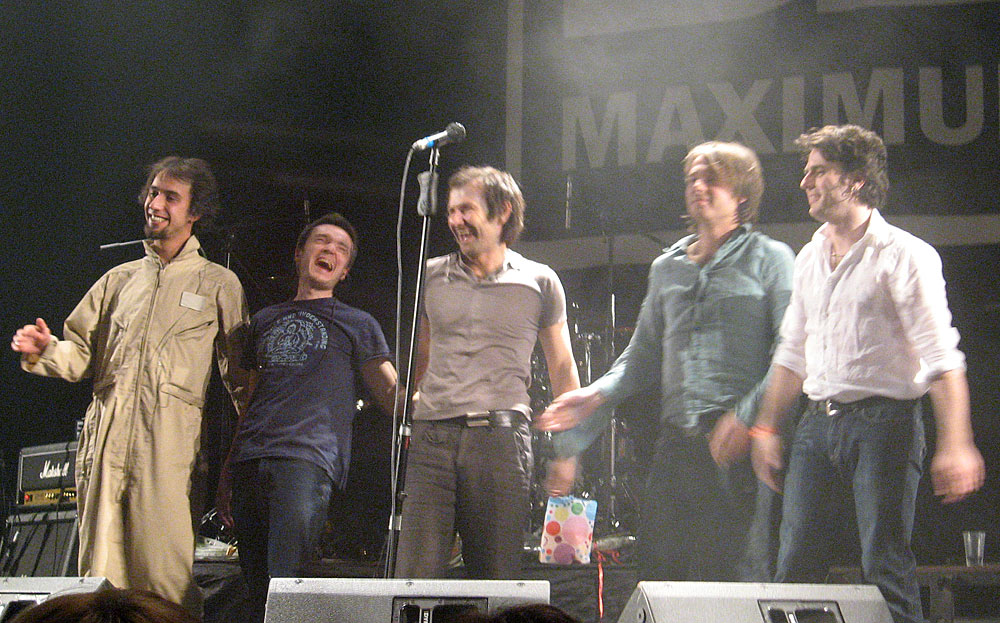
Okean Elzy - one of the most popular Ukrainian rock bands

In the late 1980s and early 1990s, a new generation of Ukrainian rock artists emerged, represented among others by Opalnyi Prynz, perhaps the most influential rock band of that period, followed by its predecessor Loony Pelen. An important event in the history of Ukrainian music during the last years of Soviet rule was the Vyvykh festival, whose first edition took place in Lviv in 1990. Among performers who played at the event were rock bands Mertvyi Piven, Plach Yeremiyi, Tabula Rasa (Ukrainian band), Banita Bayda, as well as future members of Skryabin. During that period, music festivals became a vivid expression of protest against the Soviet regime and played an important role in the Ukrainian independence movement.

Another important event in Ukrainian rock was the New Ukrainian Wave 92 ("Пісенний Вернісаж") – a festival of the best Ukrainian folk/pop/rock bands produced by Rostyslav-show, which took place in 1992. Among the most popular Ukrainian rock performers whose careers started in the 1990s are Okean Elzy, featuring Svyatoslav Vakarchuk, which has long been among the most popular pop-rock bands in Ukraine and abroad, as well as Mandry, known for their fusion of traditional Ukrainian music with rock, blues, reggae and chanson. Famous pop-singer Ruslana also uses some elements of rock in her work.

=== In the 21st century ===
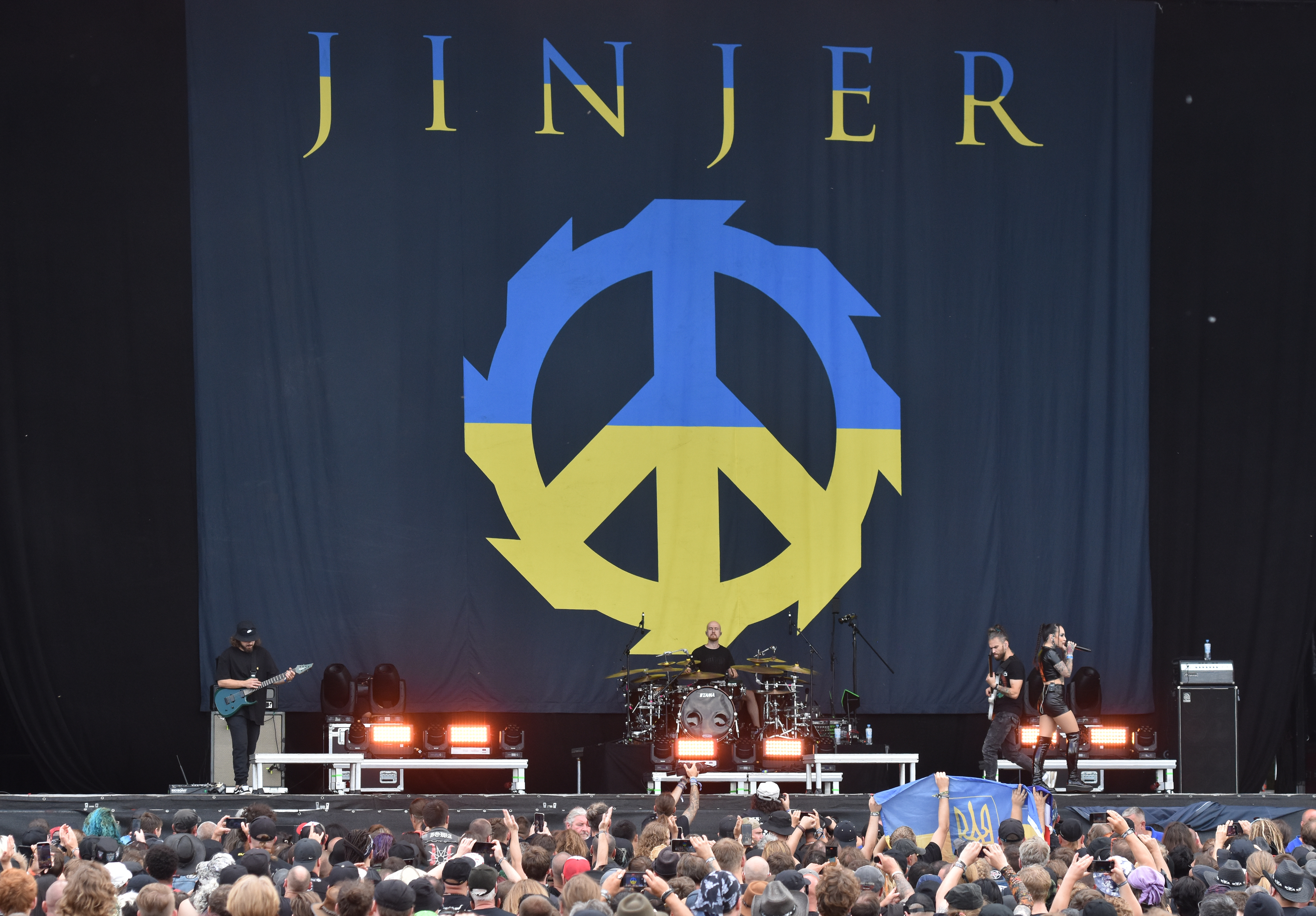
Jinjer performing at Wacken Open Air, 2023

Early 2000s saw the blooming of music festival scene in Ukraine, promoting both traditional Ukrainian culture and modern international music. Among the most prominent events of this type was the Kraina Mriy festival, founded by rock musician Oleh Skrypka of Vopli Vidopliassova and named after one of the band's albums. Other important rock music festivals in Ukraine during that period were Trypilske kolo, Faine Misto (named after a song by Braty Hadiukiny), Zaxidfest, and Stare Misto, as well as ethno-rock festivals in Pidkamin and Svirzh.

With the beginning of the Russo-Ukrainian War music events have started to play not only a cultural, but also an important social role, mobilizing the society to support the Armed Forces. Many performances have become charity events, gathering help for refugees and wounded soldiers. In addition, Ukrainian music, including rock, plays an important part in the information war, using art as a means of communication, countering propaganda and popularizing Ukrainian culture.

== Notable festivals ==
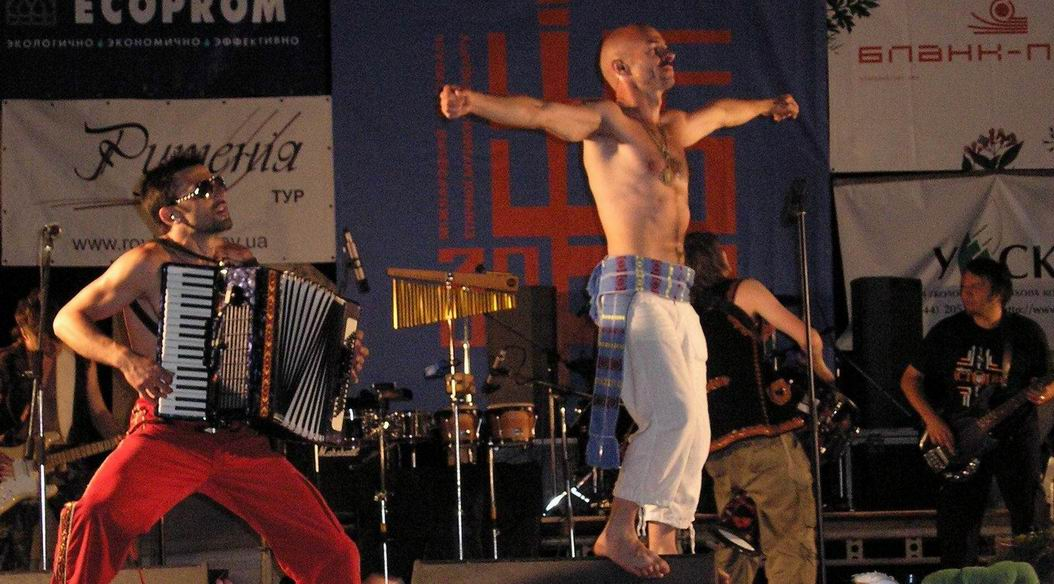
Haydamaky on the Sheshory Festival, 2005.

- Bandershtat (Volyn Oblast, 2007–present)
- Chervona Ruta (different cities of Ukraine, 1989–present)
- Taras Bulba (Dubno, Rivne Oblast, 1991–present)
- Tavria Games (Kakhovka, Kherson Oblast, 1992–present)
- Rock-Existence (Kyiv, 1996–2005)
- Rock-Sich (Kyiv, 2006–2013)
- Stare Misto (Lviv, 2007–2013)
- Trypilske kolo (Rzhyshchiv, Kyiv Oblast, 2008–present)
- Zakhid (Lviv Oblast, 2009–present)
- Respublica (Kamianets-Podilskyi, Khmelnytskyi Oblast, 2011–present)

== List of notable Ukrainian rock bands ==
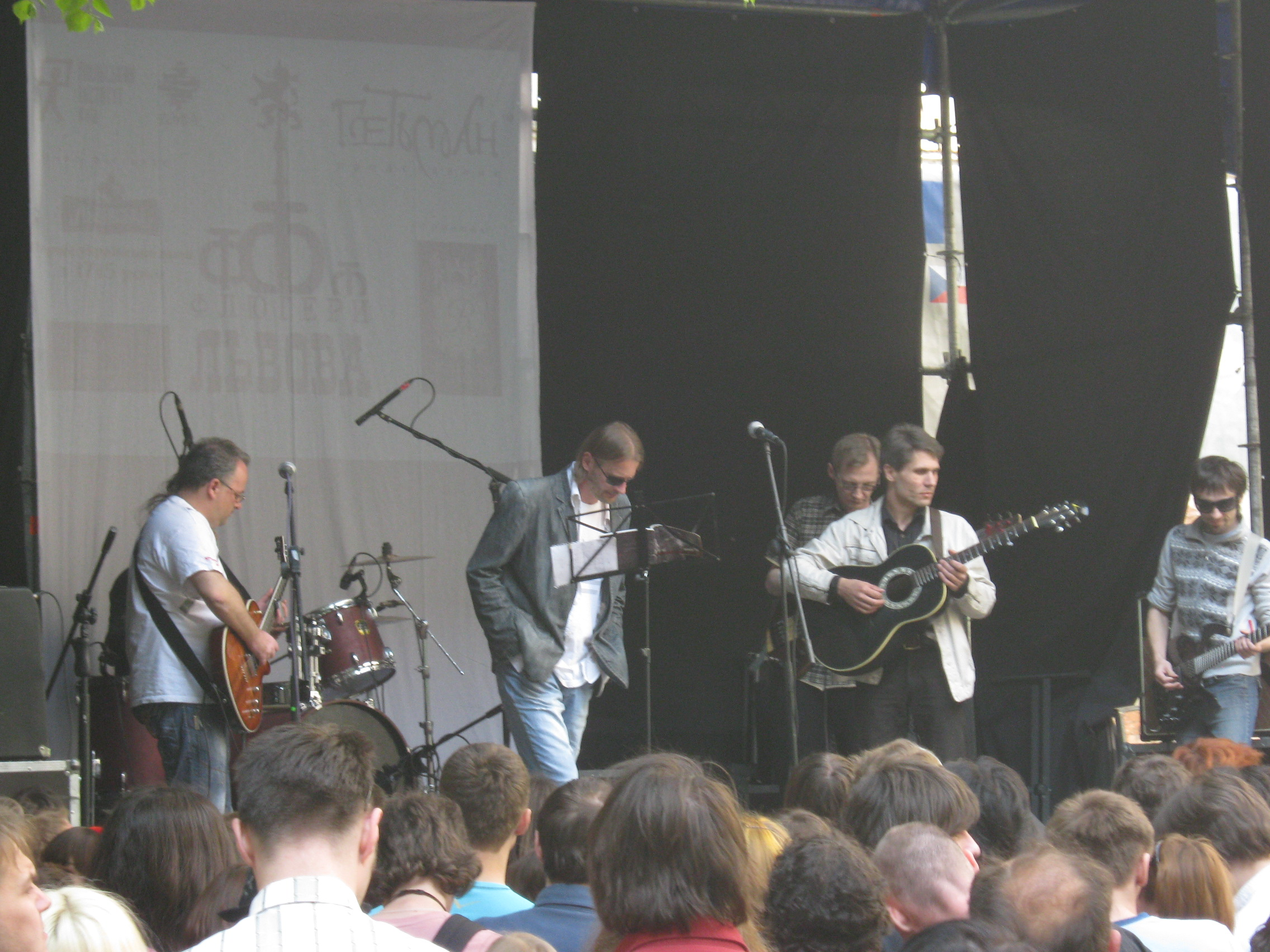
Mertvyi Piven performing in Lviv, 2010

=== Alternative rock ===
- The Hardkiss

=== Art rock ===
- Eney
- Gorgisheli
- The Telniuk Sisters
- Plach Yeremiyi
- Mertvyi Piven

=== Black metal ===
- Astrofaes
- Blood of Kingu
- Drudkh
- Hate Forest

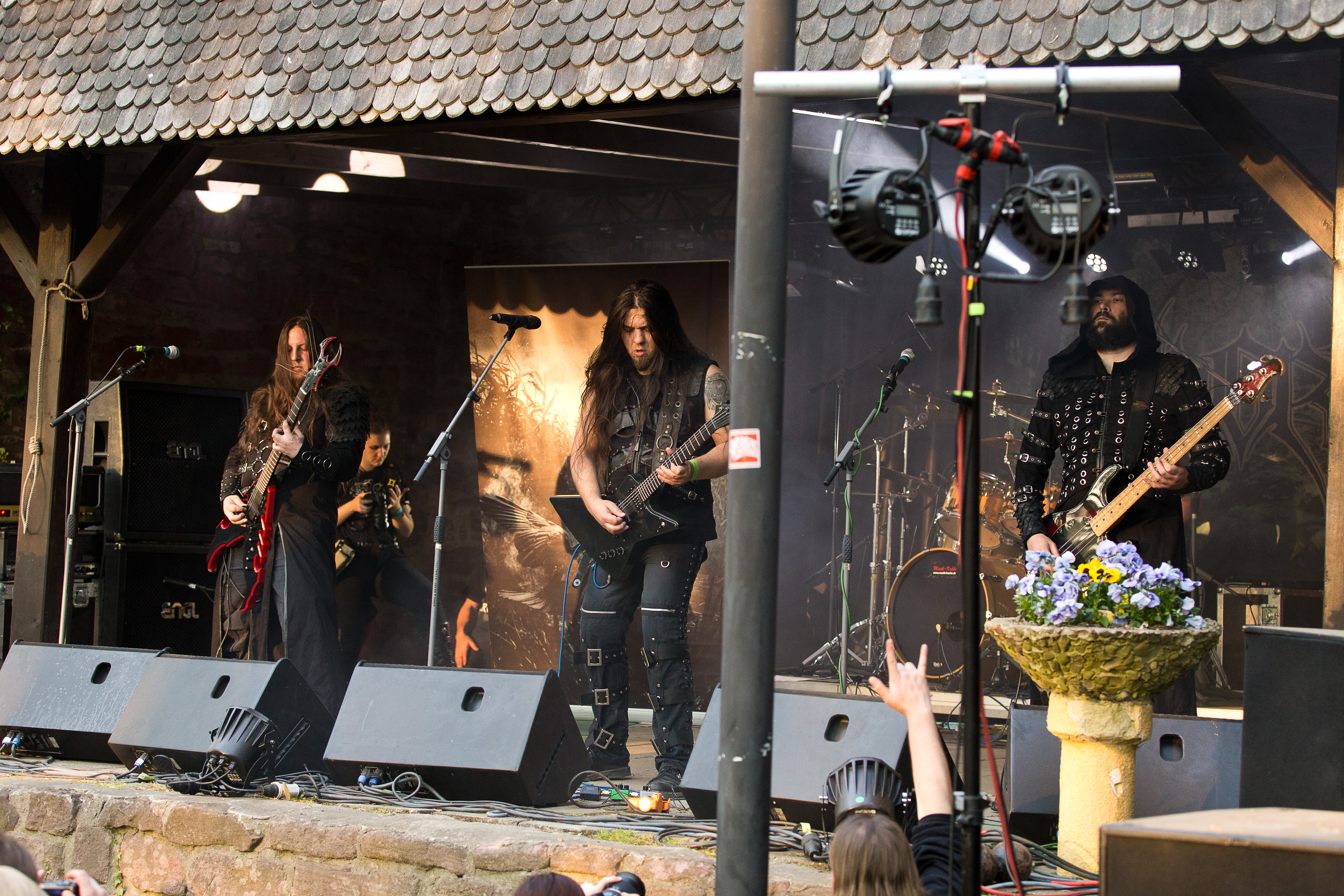
Kharkiv band Khors in 2016

- Khors
- Nokturnal Mortum

=== Death metal ===
- 1914
- Firelake
- Fleshgore

=== Indie rock ===
- Brunettes Shoot Blondes
- Esthetic Education
- Marakesh
- Valentin Strykalo

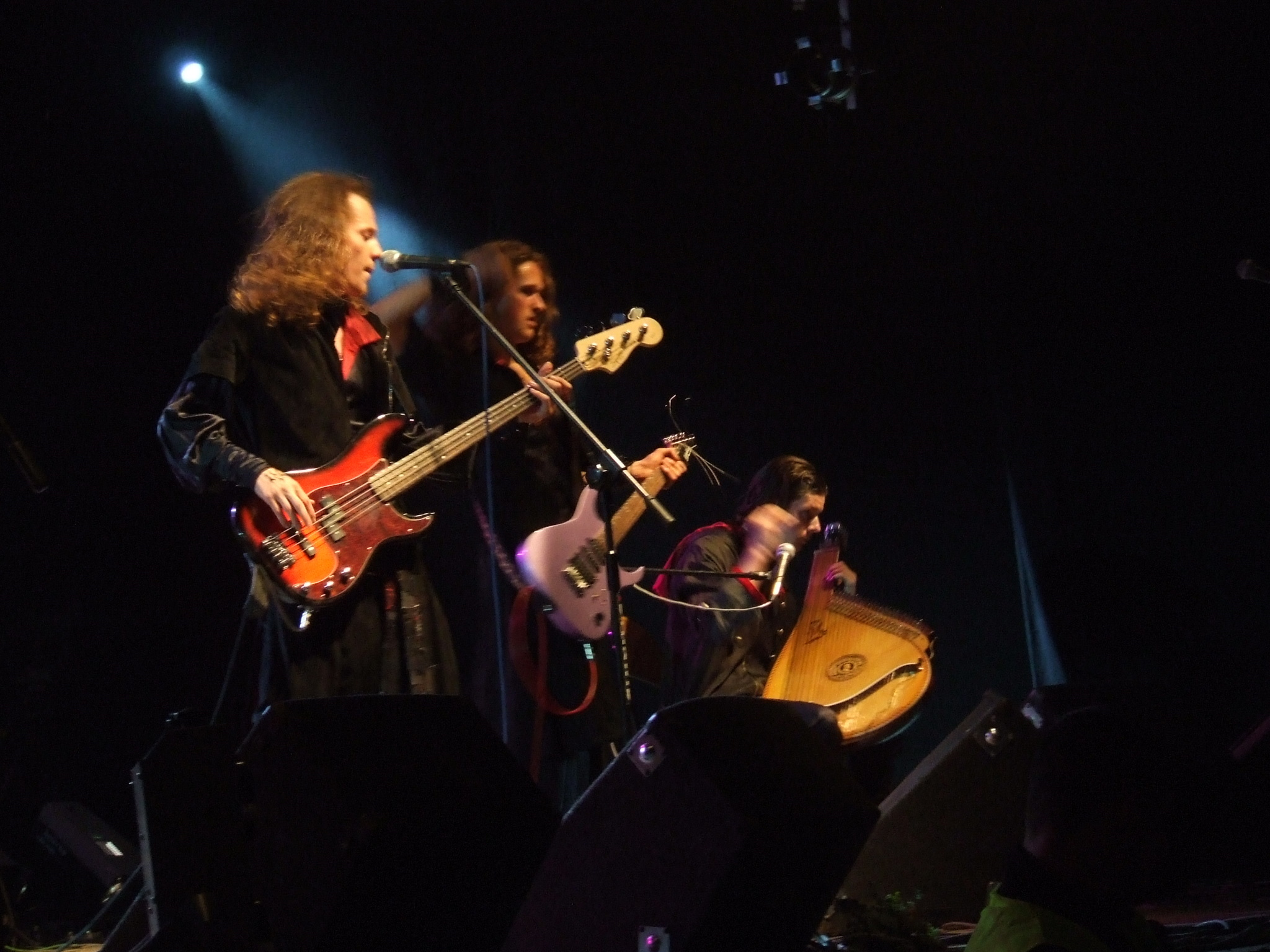
Tin Sontsia at Basowiszcza 2007 festival

=== Folk metal ===
- Holy Blood
- Kroda
- Motanka
- Tin Sontsia

=== Folk rock ===
- KOZAK SYSTEM
- Los Colorados
- Haydamaky
- Mandry

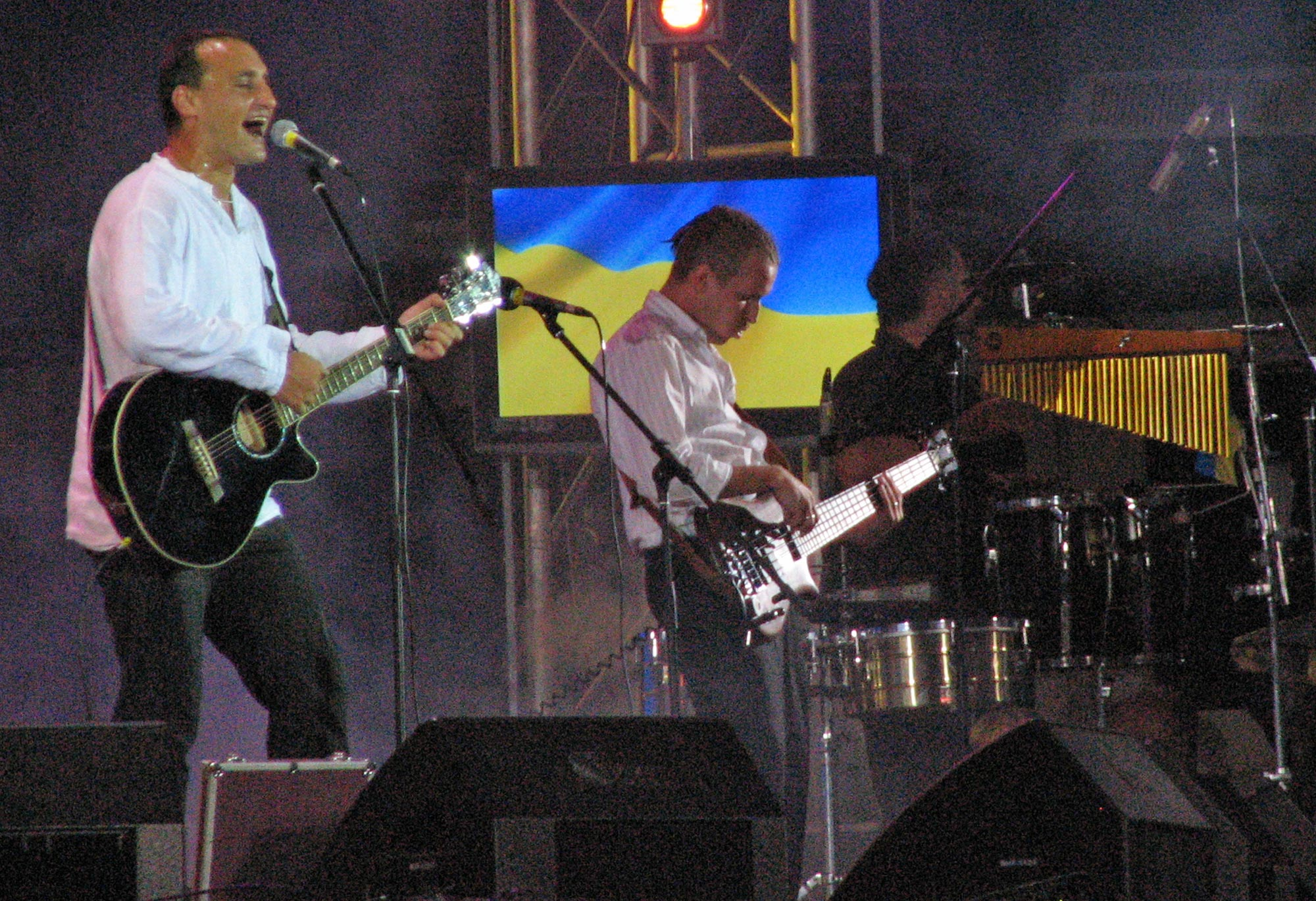
Mandry performing on Ukrainian Independence Day, 2008

- PanKe Shava
- TIK
- Vopli Vidopliasova (VV)
- Yurcash

=== Gothic metal ===
- Obiymy Doshchu

=== Gothic rock ===
- Komu Vnyz
- Viy

=== Heavy Metal ===
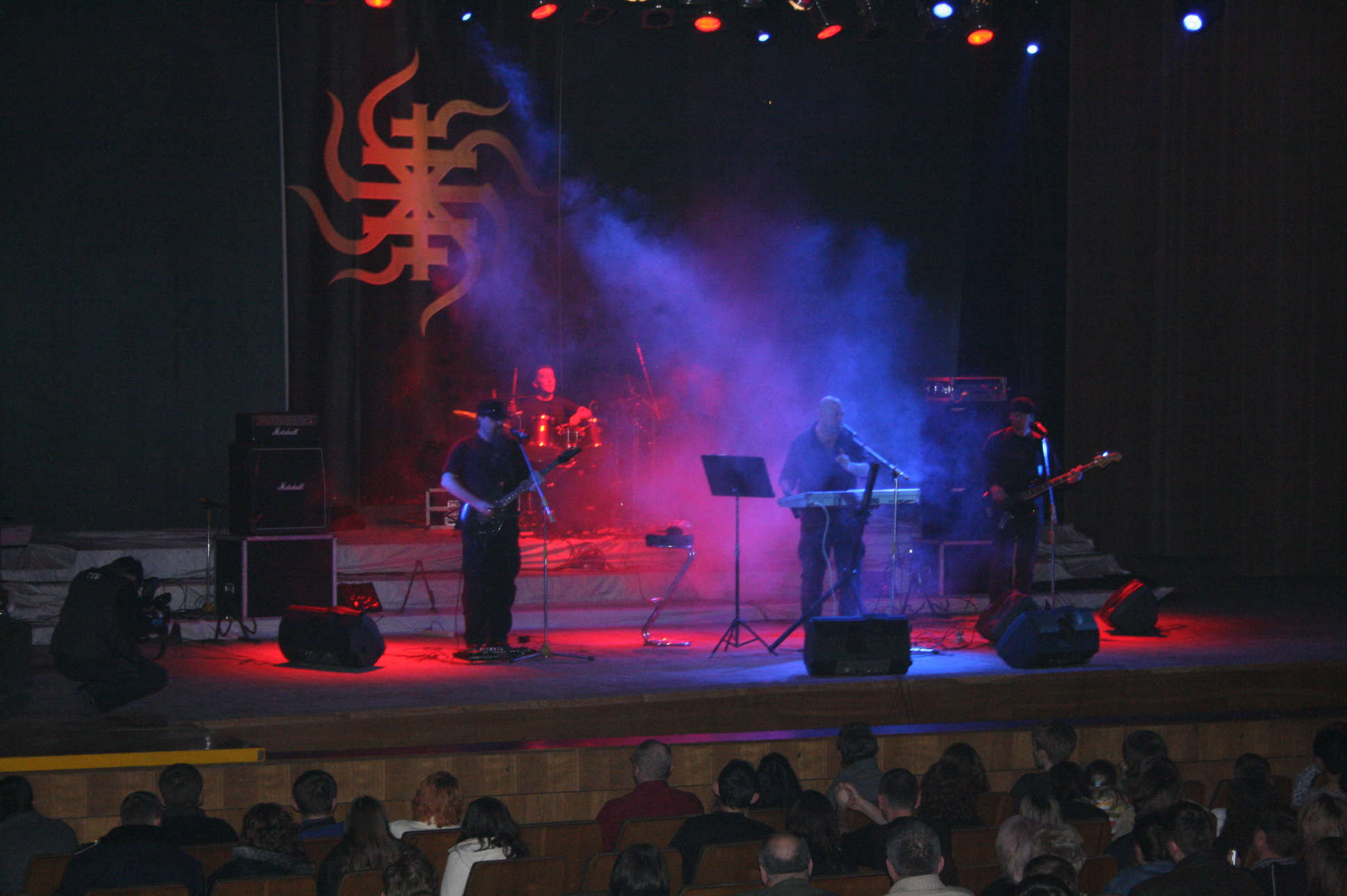
Komu Vnyz in Ternopil, 2007

- COnquest
- Monolit
- Exact Division
- KPP
- Kryliya
- JackRebel
- Bila Vezha

=== Metalcore ===
- JetRockers
- Jinjer
- Make Me Famous
- MY RENAISSANCE

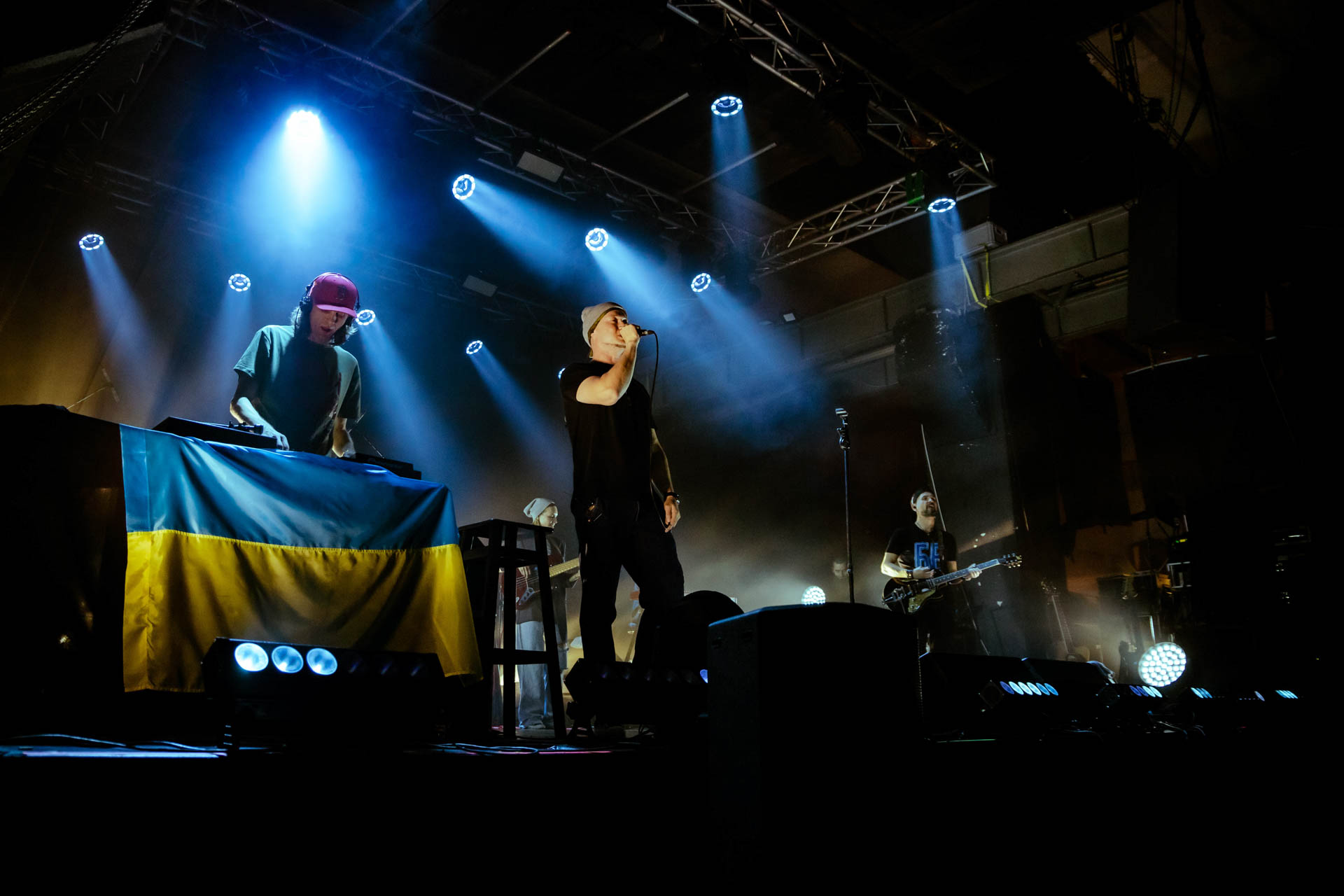
BoomBox performing in Poland, 2022

=== Pop rock ===
- BoomBox
- Druha Rika
- Krykhitka (ex-Krykhitka Tsakhes)
- Lama
- Okean Elzy
- Opalnyi Prynz
- S.K.A.Y.
- Skriabin
- Trystavisim

=== Post rock ===
- Krobak

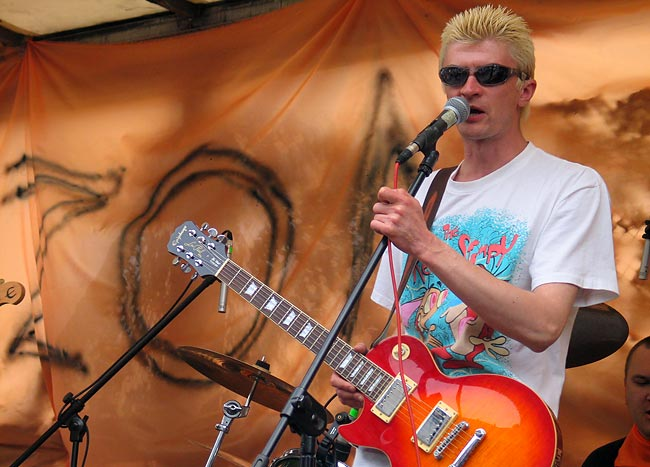
Volodymyr Novikov of Flit

=== Punk rock ===
- Braty Hadiukiny
- Dymna Sumish
- Flit
- Mad Heads XL (ex-Mad Heads)
- O.Torvald
- Perkalaba

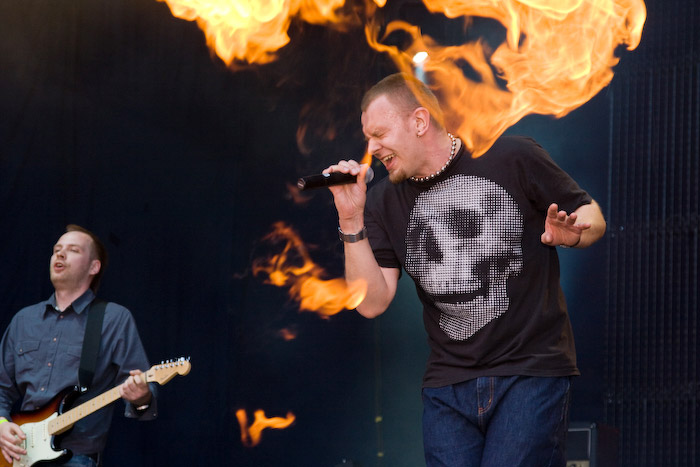
Tartak leader Oleksandr Polozhynskyi

- Qarpa (ex-Faktychno Sami)
- Robots Don't Cry
- Zhadan i Sobaky (ex-Sobaky v Kosmosi)
- Teoriia Gvaltu
- The Sixsters

=== Rap rock ===
- Tartak
- TNMK

=== Rockabilly ===
- Ot Vinta!

=== Techno-punk ===
- KhZV

== List of rock bands outside Ukraine ==
- The Ukes (Leeds, England)
- The Ukrainians (Leeds, England)
- Klooch (Toronto, Ontario, Canada)
- Enej (Olsztyn, Poland)
- Berkut (Olsztyn, Poland)
- Svoboda (Saint Petersburg, Russia)
- Sontse-Khmary (Saint Petersburg, Russia)

== See also ==
- Ukrainian metal
- Pop music in Ukraine
- Music of Ukraine
