= Braty Hadiukiny =

Braty Hadiukiny Брати Гадюкіни
- Cover of an issue of Ukrainian newspaper Culture and Life dedicated to Braty Hadiukiny

Background information
- Origin: Lviv, Ukraine
- Genres: rock'n'roll, blues, punk, reggae, funk, folk
- Years active: 1988-1996; 2006–present
- Website: www.gady.com.ua

Braty Hadiukiny (Ukrainian: Брати Гадюкіни), or simply Hady (Ukrainian: Гади) is a Ukrainian rock band from Lviv, one of the most successful Ukrainian bands of Soviet times. The band's musical style combines different genres such as rock'n'roll, blues, punk, reggae, funk and folk. Ironic song lyrics contain a lot of local vernacularisms, slang and surzhyk. The name translates as "Hadyukin Brothers", where the fictional last name Hadyukin is derived from the word hadyuka, or "viper". The abbreviation literally means "snakes" (In Ukrainian the two words are cognates.)

== Career ==
The band was active mainly between 1988 and 1996. Before 1989 they performed together with Sestrychka Vika under the name Sestrychka Vika i Braty Hadiukiny. In their initial years "Hady" participated in a number of concerts in Kyiv and Moscow. After their success at the Chervona Ruta, in the early 1990s the band toured Ukraine and also played concerts in Canada, Belgium, Germany, Slovakia and France. Braty Hadiukiny was also the first Ukrainian underground band to reach prominence in Russia, playing in Moscow with the organizational support of Russian star Alla Pugacheva. After 1992 they co-operated with a number of Ukrainian music artists, including Plach Yeremiyi, Mertvy Piven and Oleksandr Ksenofontov (husband of Ruslana).

In January 2006 they held a big solo concert in Kyiv which was a big event in Ukrainian media space and was visited by a lot of famous people (including Yulia Tymoshenko the prime minister at the time). After the band's leader Serhiy Kuzminskyi died in 2009 a big tribute concert was held in 2011, joined by prominent Ukrainian rock musicians such as Komu Vnyz, Vopli Vidoplyasova, Okean Elzy and others. In 2014 the rest of the band members released a new studio album (the first one since 1996).

== Style ==
The band's music combines elements of post-punk, rhythm-and-blues, rock'n'roll, reggae and other Western styles with Ukrainian folk elements, such as kolomyika. The texts are written in Galician suburban argot and marked with irony, humour and cynicism. A typical (anti-)hero of "Hady"'s songs is a moderate ordinary person, so called rahul' (Ukrainian: рагуль - a Ukrainian slur word used for a provincial person of low social standing). The originality of the band's aesthetics stem from the satirical depiction of human brutality and lack of culture (Ukrainian: жлобство).

== Legacy ==
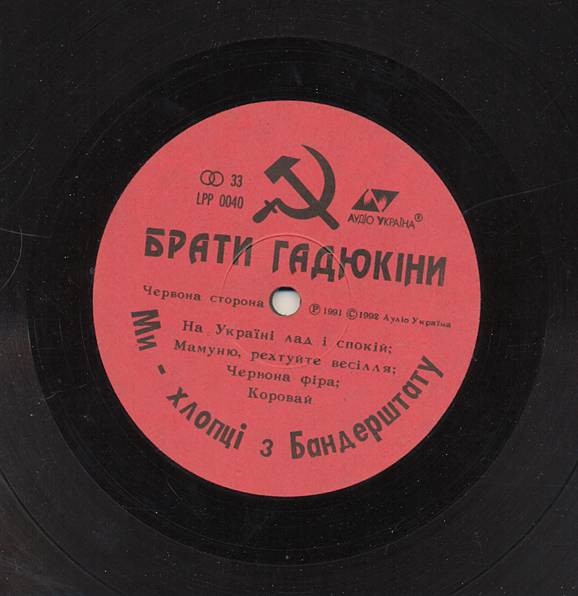
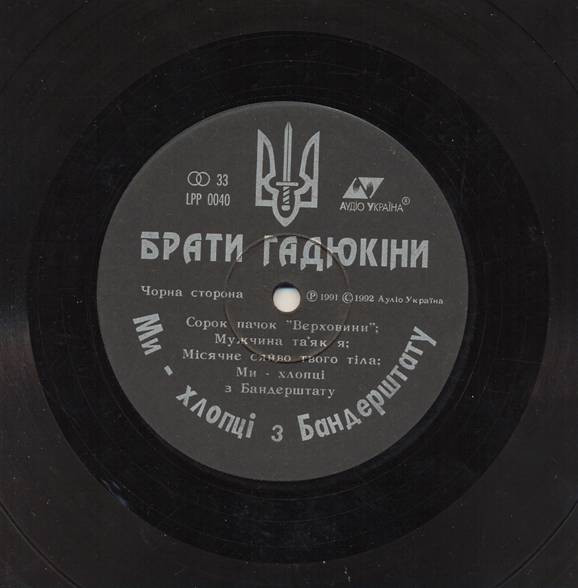
A-side and B-side of the album My - khloptsi z Bandershtadtu, playing on the contrast between Soviet Communist and Ukrainian nationalist symbols

Significant influence of the band's music on the Ukrainian society is demonstrated by the fact, that expressions from a number of their songs started to be widely used in common speech. For example, the word Bandershtadt, which was used in the name of one of their albums as an ironic name of Lviv (derived from the name of Stepan Bandera and German word Stadt - "city") has since been used by Leopolitans as a mark of pride for their city, and inspired the name of a musical festival.

Similarly, Braty Hadiukiny's song "Файне місто Тернопіль" (Cool City Ternopil) became an unofficial hymn of Ternopil and even gave the name to an annual rock festival «Файне місто» (Cool City) - even though the song depicts the life of 17-year old junkie who had recently fled away from his parents, used different types of drugs and slept with an underage girl. In his interview Serhiy Kuzminskyi commented: "If I had known that this [great popularity of the song] would happen, I would have written more decent words. Disgraceful song, I must say…”.

The band's songs are heard in a number of popular Ukrainian TV shows, such as the comedy Dovhonosyky Show, as well as in Mykyta the Fox, the first Ukrainian animated cartoon series, and the ICTV series "Cop from the Past" (2020). Hady also became subjects of urban folklore due to their reportedly chaotic lifestyle and drug addiction: the band's late leader Serhiy Kuzminskyi himself acknowledged, that the musicians used to hire an assistant, officially considered a porter, who was actually responsible for the preparation of opiates before concerts. It is also claimed that the drummer of the band Mykhailo Lundin, being in a state of narcotic withdrawal, once blocked the way for border guards by emptying between carloads while on the train Kyiv - Moscow.

== Members ==
=== Timeline ===
Current

- Ihor Melnychuk (Ігор «Ковбаса» Мельничук) — bass, vocals.
- Pavlo Krakhmal'ov (Павло Крахмальов) — keyboards, vocals.
- Henadiy Verbianyi (Генадій «Геша» Вербяний) — guitar.
- Mykhailo Lundin (Михайло «Лузя» Лундін) — drums, back vocals
- Liliya Pavlyk-Kuvaldina (Лілія Павлик-Кувалдіна) — back vocals.
- Olena Romanovska (Олена Романовська) — back vocals.
- Andriy Skachko (Андрій Скачко) — guitar (new)
- Anton Buryko (Антон Бурико) — trumpet (new)
- Volodymyr Pushkar (Володимир Пушкар) — trombone (new)
- Nazar Vachevskyi (Назар Вачевський) — saxophone (new)

Past

- Serhiy Kuzminskyi (Сергій «Кузя» Кузьмінський) — vocals, keyboards, lyrics, music (1987-1996, 2006-2009)
- Oleksandr Yemets (Олександр «Шуля» Ємець) — saxophone, lyrics, music (1987-1989)
- Oleksandr Hamburg (Олександр Гамбург) — bass, vocals (1987-1991)
- Andriy Partyka (Андрій Партика) — guitar (1987—1994)
- Ernest Khreptyk (Ернест «Кабан» Хрептик) — guitar (1991—1992)
- Stepan Koval (Степан Коваль) — wind instruments (1991—1992)
- Bohdan Vatashchuk (Богдан Ватащук) — wind instruments (1991—1992)
- Oleh Kachechka (Олег Качечка) — wind instruments (1991-1992)
- Yuliya Donchenko (Юлія Донченко) — back vocals (1994)
- Bohdan Yura (Богдан Юра) — saxophone (1994—1995)

== Discography ==
Studio albums

- 1989 Vs'o chotko! (Всьо чотко!)
- 1991 My — khloptsi z Bandershtadtu (Ми — хлопці з Бандерштадту)
- 1994 Bulo ne liubyty (Було не любити)
- 1996 Shchaslyvoyi dorohy (Bye, bye, myla) (Щасливої дороги! (Бай, бай, мила!))
- 2014 Made in Ukraine

Live albums

- 2000 Na!Zhyvo (НА!ЖИВО) (live recordings from 1994—1995)
- 2006 Live à Bruxelles (live from Brussels, 29 October 1992)
- 2006 Vrodylo (Вродило) 2CD, DVD (live from Kyiv, 20 January 2006)

DVD

- 2011 Ya vernuvsia domiv (Я вернувся домів. Концерт пам'яті Сергія Кузьмінського) (live tribute)

Other

- 2007 Love Story (love songs newly recorded)
- 2011 Ya vernuvsia domiv (Я вернувся домів) (tribute)

== Videography ==
- Narkomany na horodi
- Misyachne syaivo tvoho tila
- Zviozdochka moya
- America
- Vso chotko!
- Istoriya odniyei kurvy

== Awards ==
- Laureates of festivals Chervona Ruta in Chernivtsi (1989) and New Stars of Old Rock in Kyiv (1994)
- On February 26, 2018, band received "YUNA-2018" music award in a special nomination "For special achievements".

== See also ==
- Rock music in Ukraine

== Links ==
- Official page
- Енциклопедія української музики. Брати Гадюкіни.
- Lyrics
