= Ot Vinta! =

Ukrainian band

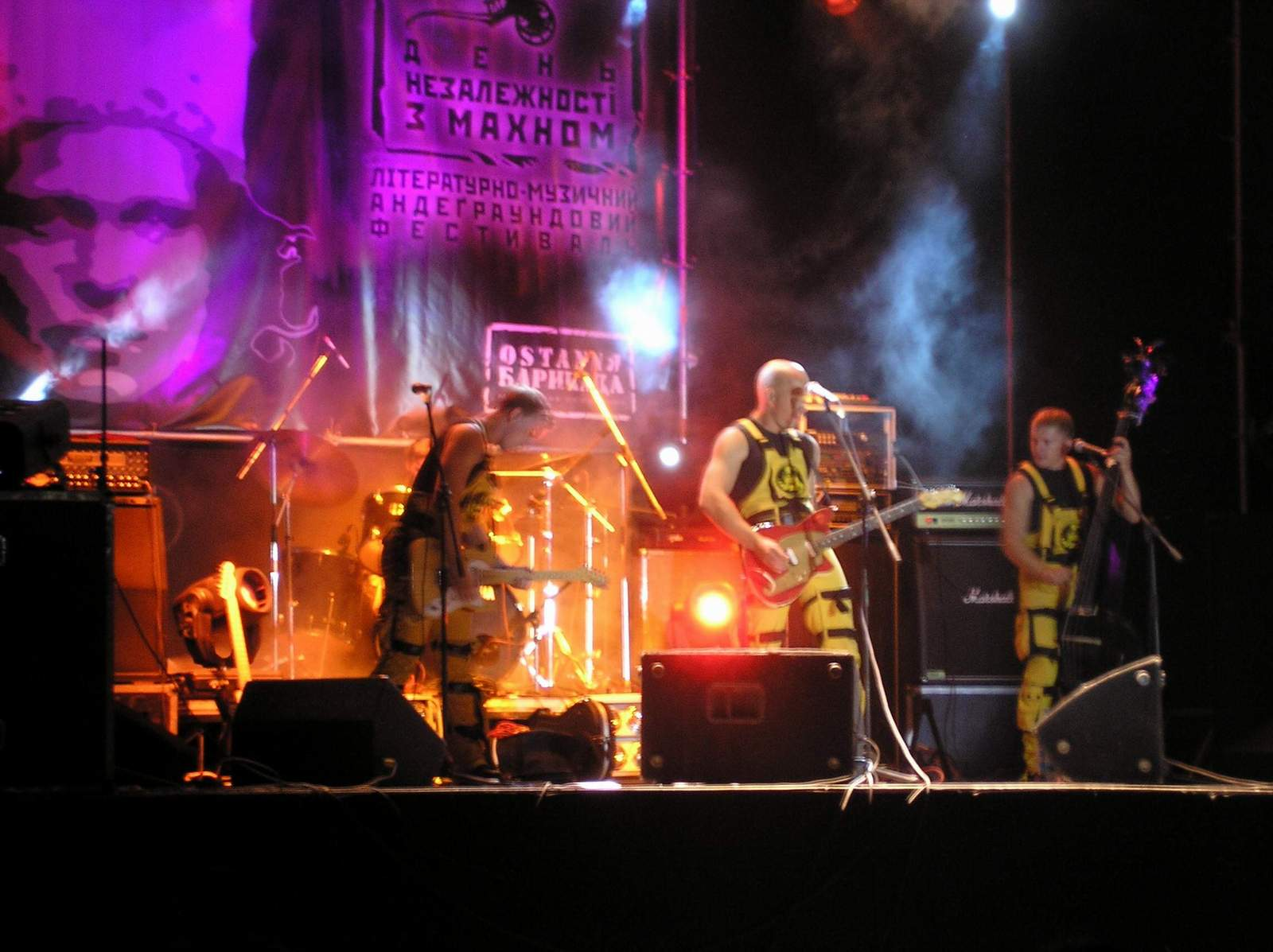
- Ot Vinta performing in Huliaipole, 2006

Background information
- Origin: Rivne, Ukraine
- Genres: Rockabilly, folk rock
- Years active: 1994–present
- Members: Yuriy Zhuravel, Viktor Pylypchuk, Volodymyr Zahyney, Serhii Myronchuk
- Past members: Andrii Ostash, Ruslan Tryhub, Mykhailo Zemelskyi, Sashko Martiushev

Ot Vinta! (Ukrainian pronunciation: [ot ʋʲinˈta], from Russian aviation slang expression meaning "let's go!") is a Ukrainian rock band from Rivne, known for developing their own self-designated music genre known as Ukrabilly (portmanteau of "Ukraine" and "rockabilly").

== History ==
The idea to create a band came to Yuri Zhuravel, the founder of the group, in 1993, and the collective started performing next year. In April 1996 the band debuted at the festival "Pearls of the Season" in Lutsk, and in December of the same year made their first recording in Lviv. Local media recognized Ot Vinta! as the best rock band of the year. In June 2001, after changes in its composition, the band recorded its first studio album. In July they performed in Moscow, and later were also invited to play in Poland and various locations in Ukraine. The band's new album Drygtyndymba, presented in 2003, became a TV and internet hit.

In 2004 Ot Vinta! participated in the international music festival Muzicorama-2004 in Giżycko, Poland. In the same year they performed at several rock festivals in Ukraine and played a concert together with Ukrainian rock legend Sestrychka Vika. During the events of the Orange Revolution in 2004 the band toured Ukraine and Poland and gave a concert in support of the protests on Kyiv's Maidan Nezalezhnosti. In 2012 Ot Vinta! represented Ukraine at the international festival Sopot Top of the Top 2012. The band is also known for its participation in theatrical performances and comedy acts, and in 2010 its members took part in Ukraine's first Red Bull Flugtag.

== Band members ==
- Yuriy Zhuravel - vocals, guitar, banjo, harmonica, music, lyrics, style
- Viktor Pylypchuk - vocals, guitar, ukulele, flute
- Volodymyr Zahyney - vocals, goat-bass
- Serhii Myronchuk - drums, percussion

== Discography ==
=== Albums ===
- Drygtyndymba (Ukrainian: Дриґтиндимба) (2003)
- I Shouldn't Have Eaten Onions (Ukrainian: Дарма я наївся цибулі) (2005)
- Ahead (Ukrainian: ПОПЕРЕДУ) (2006)
- Ass-shake (Ukrainian: Дупотряска) (2007)
- With Sweat and Blood (Ukrainian: Потом і кровʼю) (2011)
- Pilotka (Ukrainian: Пілотка) (2014)

== Videography ==
- Woman Had No Trouble... (Ukrainian: Не мала баба клопоту...) (2002)
- I shouldn't Have Eaten Onions (Ukrainian: Дарма я наївся цибулі) (2006)
- Oplya-Potato (Ukrainian: Опля-картопля) (2006)
- Ahead (Ukrainian: Попереду) (2007)
- Grandma's Cabinet (Ukrainian: Бабина Тумба) (2008)
- Song of May-Lilies (Ukrainian: Пісня конвалій) (2009)
- Will Not Go (Ukrainian: Не піду) (2010)
- I Love (Ukrainian: Люблю) (2010)
- In the Dark-Dark Forest (Ukrainian: У лісі лісі темному) (2011)
- New Year Ding (Ukrainian: Новорічний Дзинь) (2011)
- Come With the Crane (Ukrainian: Гайда за журавлем) (2011)
- "Ukraine Between My Legs" (Ukrainian: У мене... Україна!) (2012)
- It's Christmas! (Ukrainian: Це Різдво) (2012)
- Grandmother Smoked Crane (Ukrainian: Накурила Баба Журавля) (2013)
- 16 Tons (Ukrainian: 16 тонн) (2014)
- Make Love, Dark-Browed, But Not With the Russians (Ukrainian: Кохайтеся, чорноброві) (2015)
- Our Boys at the War (Ukrainian: Наші хлопці на війні) (2016)
- Forward (Ukrainian: Попереду) (2016)
- We Coil (Ukrainian: Ми коло!) (2016)

== Sources ==
- Official website of the band
