= Stare Misto (music festival) =

Former Ukrainian music festival (2007–2013)

- Genre: Rock, ethnic, electronic
- Dates: One day, usual near the end of May
- Location(s): Lviv, Ukraine
- Years active: 2007-2013
- Founders: First Private Brewery
- Website: stare-misto.ua

Stare Misto Lviv Rock Fest was a music festival which took place in Lviv, Ukraine annually between 2007 and 2013. It was organised by the First Private Brewery (Преша Приватна Броварня), a local brewery. Despite its small scale, it was occasionally referred to as one of the best festivals in Ukraine. It featured both Ukrainian and European bands, such as Kaiser Chiefs, Esthetic Education, Gogol Bordello, IAMX, Archive, Okean Elzy, and The Subways among others.

== History ==
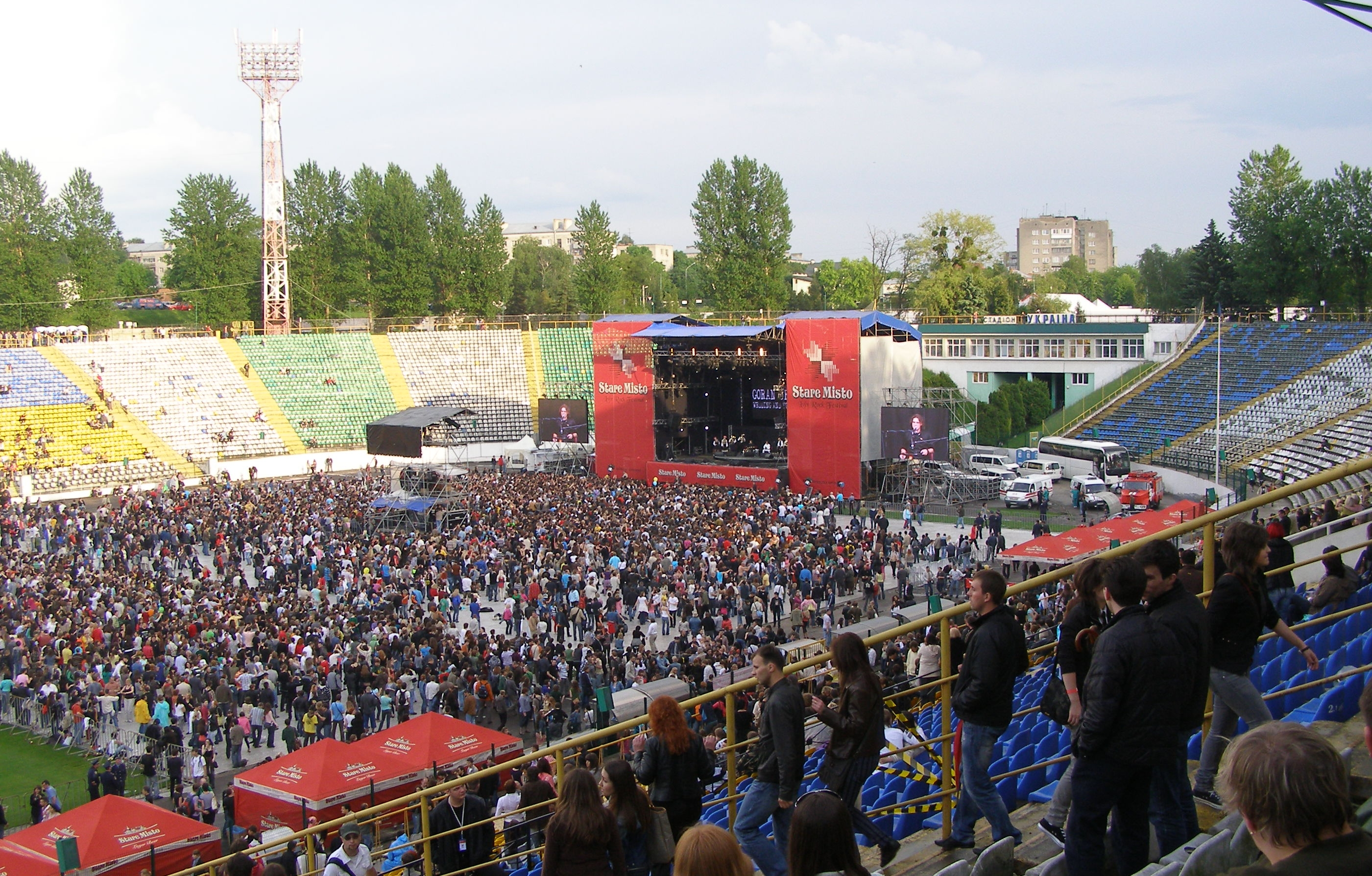
Stare Misto Festival in 2010

=== 2007 ===
The first Stare Misto Festival took place on 10 June 2007 at the Bohdan Khmelnytsky Culture and Leisure Park. It was organised as a free event. The line-up consisted of:

- (Ukraine) Bozhychi
- (Ukraine) Karpatiyany
- (Belarus) Pivo Vdvoem
- (Ukraine) Lilya Vavrin
- (Ukraine) VovaZIL’Vova (Headliner)

=== 2008 ===
The second Stare Misto Festival became a two-day event, taking place on 31 May to 1 June 2008, at the same venue. Due to the high costs of the festival, it was decided that this was the last time it would be organised for free. The line-up consisted of:

First day:

- (Belarus) Serebryanaya Svadba
- (Belarus) Pivo Vdvoem
- (Moldova) Zdob si Zdub
- (Ukraine) Vopli Vidopliassova (Headliner)

Second Day:

- (Ukraine) S.K.A.Y.
- (Ukraine) Esthetic Education
- (Ukraine) Okean Elzy (Headliner)

=== 2009 ===
From 2009 the festival was held at a new venue, the Ukraina Stadium in Lviv. This was also the first year tickets were enforced. The line-up consisted of:

- (Ukraine) Mad Heads XL
- (Ukraine) Haydamaky
- (Ukraine) Vopli Vidopliassova
- (Finland) Korpiklaani
- (Russia) Splean
- (United States) Gogol Bordello (Headliner)

=== 2010 ===
The 2010 edition took place once again at the Ukraine Stadium, on 22 May 2010. The line-up consisted of:

- (United Kingdom) DJ Scratchy
- (United Kingdom) The Urban Voodoo Machine
- (Canada) The Dreadnoughts
- (United Kingdom) IAMX
- (Serbia) Goran Bregovic Wedding and Funeral Band
- (Ukraine) Okean Elzy (Headliner)

=== 2011 ===
The festival took place on 28 May 2011 at the Ukraina Stadium. The line-up consisted of:

- (France) La Phaze
- (Italy) Talco
- (Ukraine) Perkalaba (Unannounced)
- (Germany) Rotfront
- (Finland) Poets of the Fall
- (United Kingdom) IAMX
- (Serbia) Emir Kusturica and the No Smoking Orchestra (Headliner)

=== 2012 ===
The festival didn't take place in 2012 due to schedule conflicts with Lviv's hosting the Euro 2012.

=== 2013 ===
The final edition of the festival took place on 8-9 June on the Ukraina Stadium. The festival, for the first time since 2008, became a two-day event. In subsequent years, due to profitability concerns, it was not organised anymore. The line-up consisted of:

First Day:

- (Ukraine) Epolets
- (Belarus) Lyapis Trubetskoy
- (Spain) Che Sudaka
- (United Kingdom) Archive
- (United Kingdom) IAMX (Headliner)
- (Serbia) Goran Bregovic

Second Day:

- (Ukraine) Mufftrain
- (Germany) Fiddler's Green
- (Finland) Leningrad Cowboys
- (United Kingdom) The Subways
- (United Kingdom) Kaiser Chiefs (Headliner)
- (Russia) DDT
