= Eney =

Ukrainian rock band

Eney Еней
- Origin: Kyiv, Ukrainian SSR, Soviet Union
- Genres: Rock
- Years active: 1968 – 1977
- Past members: Kyrylo Stetsenko (1970-1977); Taras Petrynenko (1968-1971); Ihor Shablovsky (1968-1975); Mykola Kyrylin (1968-1975); Kostiantyn Kurko (1973-1977); Oleksandr Blinov (1968-1971); Volodymyr Davydov (1968-1970) and others

Eney (Ukrainian: Еней) was a Ukrainian rock (big-beat) band active in 1968–1977. Named after the famous character, Aeneas, from one of the literary works of Ivan Kotlyarevsky, Eney was the first Ukrainian band to perform its own repertoire.

== History ==
During the 1960s Students from the Kyiv special music school formed a band named after Ukrainian composer Mykola Lysenko. They initially played unique interpretations of Ukrainian folk songs. Later its members were exposed to the late works of The Beatles and started to rearrange works of Bach and Khachaturian.

Starting from 1970, the band performed songs in Ukrainian language. Eney's performances took place in a number of Kyiv's higher education establishments, and their recordings were broadcast by Ukrainian television and radio. In 1971 the band split as Petrynenko and Blinov left it to form the new band called Dzvony. The band started to experiment in new genres: blues and soul.

In 1972 the band and their music where banned in the Soviet Union and labeled "bourgeois-national". As a result, all existing records and recordings were destroyed. After that the band went underground until 1974. The members then merged with Dzvony into the new vocal-instrumental ensemble Decorative Trails. After the band was accepted to the Ukr-kontsert it changed its name to Hrono. In 1977 the ensemble became known as Eney once again. After a period of time, Eney broke up and its members either joined different bands or went solo. Petrynenko later created his own band Hrono.

== Musical style ==
Eney's songs combined elements of Ukrainian folk (duma, kolomyika, humorous songs) and North American musical genres (blues, rock-n-roll, country music). In its compositions the band used texts by notable Ukrainian authors, including Stepan Rudansky, Oleksandr Oles, Pavlo Tychyna, Vasyl Symonenko, Lina Kostenko, Dmytro Pavlychko and others.

== Notable songs ==
- Eney (Еней, Aeneas) - words and music by T. Petrynenko
- Zberezhy (Збережи, Save) - words and music by K. Stetsenko
- Ty znayesh, shcho ty liudyna (Ти знаєш, що ти людина, You know that you are human) - words by V. Symonenko, music by K. Stetsenko
- Pisnia (Пісня, Song) - words by O. Oles, music by K. Stetsenko
- Soniachne vesillia (Сонячне весілля, Sunny wedding) - words by D. Cherednychenko, music by K. Stetsenko
- Snihy (Сніги, Snows) - words by D. Cherednychenko, music by M. Kyrylin
- Mosty (Мости, Bridges) - words by P. Tychyna, music by M. Kyrylin
- Chary nochi (Чари ночі, Charms of the night) - words by O. Oles, music by M. Kyrylin
- Chy daleko do neba (Чи далеко до неба, Is it far to the sky) - words by S. Rudansky, music by O. Blinov
- Ta orav muzhyk kray dorohy (Та орав мужик край дороги, And the muzhik ploughed by the road) - folk song arranged by T. Petrynenko
- Khvalylasia bereza (Хвалилася береза, The birch boasted) - folk song arranged by K. Stetsenko
- Mariyka bula (Марійка була, Mariyka was) - folk song arranged by K. Stetsenko
- Viye viter z polia (Віє вітер з поля, The wind blows from the field) - folk song arranged by K. Stetsenko
- Plyve kacha (Пливе кача, The duck swims) - folk song arranged by T. Melnyk
- Dobryi vechir tobi (Добрий вечір тобі. Good evening to you) - koliadka
