= Obiymy Doshchu =

Obiymy Doshchu Обійми Дощу
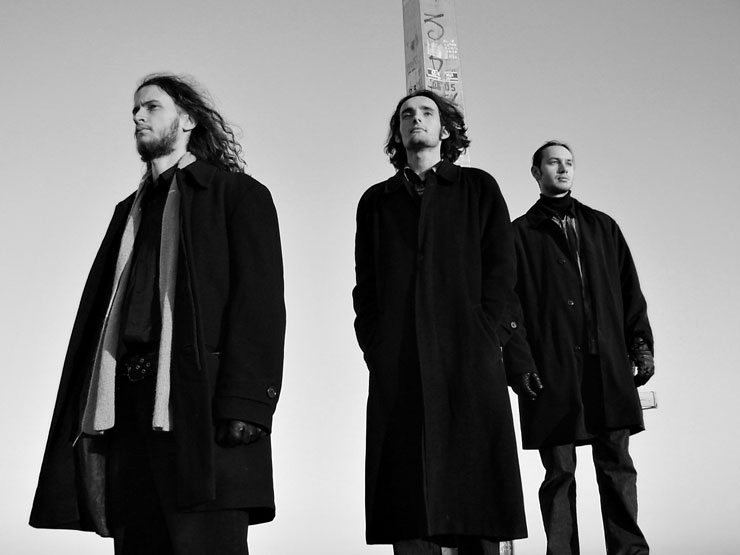
- Obiymy Doshchu (in 2017 lineup)

Background information
- Origin: Kyiv, Ukraine
- Genres: Rock, progressive rock, symphonic rock
- Years active: 2004–present
- Label: Nash Format (Ukraine)
- Members: Volodymyr Agafonkin; Oleksiy Katruk; Mykola Kryvonos; Olena Nesterovska; Yaroslav Gladilin; Yevhen Dubovyk
- Past members: Andriy Demyanenko; Serhiy Dumler; Maria Kurbatova
- Website: http://rain.in.ua

Obiymy Doshchu (Ukrainian: Обійми Дощу, translation: Rain's Embrace) is a Ukrainian rock band that describes its music genre as a lyrical, autumnal rock music with progressive rock, neoclassic and doom metal influences.

== Biography ==
=== 2004—2006, band formation, first recordings ===
Obiymy Doshchu was started as a one-man project in 2004 as a result of Volodymyr's interest in writing music, singing and playing an acoustic guitar. His friend Oleksiy Katruk became involved in the project and helped Volodymyr record his first demo, and the demo in turn inspired his university mate Mykola to make a video for one of the songs (Mertve Derevo I Viter).

In spring 2006, Volodymyr forms the band with Oleksiy on the keyboards and Mykola on the bass guitar. In this lineup, the band makes its first live performance in Kyiv.

In Autumn, Oleksiy replaces keyboards with electric guitar and Andriy Demyanenko joins the band as a keyboard player. The band continues to create new songs and occasionally perform live. During this time, Oleksiy finishes the second video of the band (for the song Zorenko Moya). At the end of the year, Obiymy Doshchu record their second demo with 6 songs.

=== 2007—2008, line-up complete, live activities ===
In 2007, the band finally finds a drummer – Serhiy Dumler. The same year, Maria Kurbatova joins the band as a keyboards player to replace Andriy Demyanenko.

Having a complete line-up, the band starts to actively perform live in 2008, playing at many festivals and other places among Ukraine. They also make their third recording in the studio, Pid Khmaramy, to prepare itself for the upcoming recording of an ambitious debut album.

=== 2009, debut album, first solo concert ===
Obiymy Doshchu released their debut album Elehia on August 29, 2009, as a free download on their website. The album contains 8 songs and represents a certain summary of the band's activities since its formation. It is a conceptual album with a single story. It also has rich string arrangements and contains many contributions from guest musicians.

Reviewers called the album "an outstanding result in the genre" but also "monotonous, with intentionally limited emotional palette", "expressing the same mood in every track" but "nevertheless one of the most impressive and inspired releases in a long time", "a new approach to creative work in many ways" and "a phenomenon worth attention of all fans of twilight lyricism". The band played its first big solo concert in Kyiv on October 22, 2009. This day can also be considered as the official day of violist Olena Nesterovska joining the band as a permanent member.

On December 10, the band released a new 2-song single Svitanok and a video for one of the songs directed by Mykola Kryvonos.

=== 2017, second album ===
On November 17, 2017, band released their second album Son (Ukrainian: Сон, translation: Dream). The album is 72 minutes long and contains 11 tracks. 15 musicians and 10 sound engineers were involved in recording, which took over 200 hours in 7 different studios across 3 cities. The album was mixed by British musician and sound producer Bruce Soord, the frontman of the band The Pineapple Thief, who also worked with acts of the progressive music scene such as Opeth, Anathema, Riverside, Tesseract and Blackfield. The band describes the album as "complex, beautiful, poetic rock music with lush string arrangements and progressive rock, neoclassical, neofolk and post-rock elements."

The album was supported by two singles:

- Single "Kryla" (Ukrainian: Крила, translation: Wings) was released on October 5, 2017, with interactive web-visualization.
- Single "Razom" (Ukrainian: Разом, translation: Together) was released on November 2, 2017, also with interactive web-visualization.

=== Working on the next album ===
On February 14, 2020, the band released the first music video for the song Na Vidstani.

== Members ==
=== Current members ===
- Volodymyr Agafonkin – vocals, acoustic guitar (2004—present)
- Oleksiy Katruk – electric guitar (2006—present), keyboards (2005–2006)
- Mykola Kryvonos – bass guitar, flute (2006—present)
- Olena Nesterovska – viola (2009—present)
- Yaroslav Gladilin – drums, percussion (2012—present)
- Yevhen Dubovyk – keyboards (2016—present)

=== Guest members ===
- Hanna Kryvonos – backing vocals
- Yana Shakirzhanova – violin

Guest members occasionally perform live with the band and take part in studio recordings.

=== Former members ===
- Andriy Demyanenko – keyboards (2006–2007)
- Serhiy Dumler – drums, percussion (2006–2012)
- Maria Kurbatova – keyboards (2007–2016)

== Discography ==
=== Studio albums ===
- 2009 — Elehia (Елегія)
- 2017 — Son (Сон)
- 2025 — Vidrada (Відрада)

=== Singles ===
- 2010 — Svitanok (Світанок)
- 2017 — Kryla (Крила)
- 2017 — Razom (Разом)
- 2020 — At distance (На відстані)
- 2024 — Children (Діти)
- 2025 — Don't Give Up (Не опускати руки)
- 2025 — After the War (Після війни)

== Videos ==
1. 2005 – Mertve Derevo I Viter (director: Mykola Kryvonos)
2. 2006 — Zorenko Moya (director: Oleksiy Katruk)
3. 2010 — Svitanok (director: Mykola Kryvonos)
4. 2020 — Na Vidstani (director: Andrii Korotych)
