= Gorgisheli =

Ukrainian Rock band

Gorgisheli Ґорґішелі
- Origin: Lviv, Ukraine
- Genres: Rock, art rock, folk rock
- Years active: 1997 – present
- Members: Tamara Gorgisheli; Eteri Gorgisheli; Oleg Sook; Oleksiy Slobodian; Marian Kozovyy
- Website: www.gorgisheli.org.ua

Gorgisheli (Ukrainian: Ґорґішелі; Georgian: გორგიშელი) is a Ukrainian rock band. The band's songs are sung in the Ukrainian and Georgian languages. Their music combines elements of art rock, Georgian and Ukrainian folk music with a modern sound.

The project was known from 1997 to year as Black September (Chornyy Veresen'). A new sound emerged when the well-known bass player John (Project "Is" in 1995 and 2002, Tea Fan Club, Oh, Dead Rooster) joined the group. The band was formally formed under the name "Gorgisheli" in 2003 by the sisters Tamara and Eteri Gorgisheli, who were ethnic Georgians that lived in Lviv.

The group has participated in many festivals, including Melody, Black Sea Games, Red Rue (Chervona Ruta), Pearls of the Season, Pok-existence, Europe Center, Taras Bulba, the festival of Ukrainian culture in Sopot, Poland. The members of the band participated in the TV show Fresh Blood (Svizha Krov) on M1 channel, where they scored the largest number of points of all participants. Gorgisheli's performance during the Orange Revolution issue hit Euronews.

In summer 2006, the band signed a long-term contract with Comp Music/EMI, in cooperation with which their debut album entitled Amore was released on November 20 of that year.

== Band members ==
- Tamara Gorgisheli — main vocals, acoustic guitar
- Eteri Gorgisheli — back vocals, bass guitar
- Oleg Sook — keyboard
- Oleksiy Slobodian — drums
- Marian Kozovyy — electric guitar

== Discography ==
"Не дивись на мене так (Ne dyvysj na mene tak, Don't look at me like this)"

=== Albums ===
- 2006 — Аморе (Amore)
- 2009 — Live (Live)
- 2010 — Ромбамбар (Rombambar/Rhubarb)
