= Teoriia Gvaltu =

Ukrainian music band

Teoriia Gvaltu Теорія Ґвалту
- Origin: Khmelnytskyi
- Genres: Street punk; ska; post-rock; folk punk
- Years active: 2007–2017
- Label: Underground Rec
- Members: Oleksii Kalashnyk; Sashko Baranov; Pankrat Cios; Vadym Kanchalaba

Teoriia Gvaltu (Ukrainian: Теорія Ґвалту, translation: Ruckus Theory) – a Ukrainian music band that plays in the genres of street punk, ska and folk punk.

== Biography ==
Formed in 2007, the band originally, in all respects, consisted of Les` (vocals, flute, trombone), Sashko (guitar, vocals) and Ivan (bass). Laptop samples had performed feature of drummer. By the time the guys listened to a variety of music and tried to play all heard in these compositions. The group combines folk, old-school-hardcore, ska and nu-metal.

Dmytro (drums) and Nadia (accordion) joined the group in 2007. After charismatic accordionista went to Odesa study medicine, Roman joined the band (keyboards, accordion, backing vocals). The band sent toward the style of ska, ska punk and reggae. When Ivan left the group, another Roman went to replace the bass. In 2011, Pancrate, the former leader of the Russian group "Keine Engel" (c. Perm), began to perform role of the bassist.

At the moment diverse musical style of the group can be described as punk rock (street punk, oi!) interspersed Ukrainian-Irish folk and ska punk.

== Current members ==
- Oleksii Kalashnyk — vocal, trombone, sopilka, keyboard (2007–present)
- Sashko Baranov — vocal, guitar (2007–present)
- Pankrat Cios — bass, backing vocals (2011–present)
- Vadym Kanchalaba — drums (2009–present)

== Discography ==
- Three Arrows EP (2011)
- Karmaliuk (2016)
