= Krykhitka Tsakhes =

Former Ukrainian music band

- Origin: Kyiv, Ukraine
- Genres: rock, trip hop
- Years active: 1997
- Members: Oleksandra Koltsova; Mykola Matkovsky; Yevhen Matkovsky; Yuriy Yurchenko
- Website: www.kryhitka.com.ua

Krykhitka Tsakhes (Ukrainian: Крихітка Цахес) is a Ukrainian rock band formed in 1999 in Kyiv, Ukraine. The band is considered to perform rock and trip hop music styles. In 2007 the band changed its name to Krykhitka.

== Members ==
- Oleksandra "Kasha Saltsova" Koltsova - vocal, lyrics (1999–present)
- Oleksandr Zlenko - drums (2007–present)
- Mykola Matkovsky - guitar (2007–present), bass (1999–2007)

== Former members ==
- Dmytro "Bass" Mrachkovsky - bass (1997-1999, 2007)
- Mykhailo "Mihon" Hichan - guitar (1999–2007)
- Yevhen "Jack" Matkovsky - drums (1999–2007)
- Yuriy Yurchenko - sax, clarinet (1999)

== Albums ==
- 2005 - Na pershomu mistsi (На першому місці) // COMP music/EMI.
- 2009 - Rezept (Рецепт) // Fast Perfect
