= JetRockers =

JetRockers is a Ukrainian hard rock and heavy metal band from Lviv, Ukraine. The band was founded in 2007.

== History ==
JetRockers were founded by Vasyl Mylko and Serhii Otroshchenko. The very beginnings start out in 2007 in Lviv, at software company SoftServe, when Vasyl Mylko, strategic business unit (SBU) Manager of JetLab, was interviewing Serhii Otroshchenko. Serhii was a SoftServe University graduate, while JetLab lacked resources. So during the interview Vasyl asked if Serhii played some instruments or at least painted. Serhii answered affirmative. It happened that Vasyl had an electric guitar and an amplifier in the office, so they were given to the interviewee for some performance. Serhii played something from Kreator and Malmsteen and thus was hired to JetLab. The band name was invented to be JetRockers. There was an idea that all JetRockers members had to be from the same JetLab team. It was so till 2008.

Bass guitar, Roman Bilusiak, joined the band soon, he is from musicians family. Vitaliy Topolnytskyy joined as a drummer. In Summer 2007 JetLab team went to Shatsky ozera for barbecue, JetRockers took all the gear. There was first big sound check and the casting for vocals. Khrystyna Kosyk succeeded as a singer of rock compositions, Vyacheslav Dyak was selected for heavy metal and punk rock songs. It is supposed that band played successfully, which was confirmed by the random listeners from the recreation area Shatsky ozera. Rehearsal delayed till the late night. Then new drummer was invited, Ivan Lutsyk. Interesting fact is that Vasyl Mylko got references to him from Roman Figel from JetLab, and found Ivan in the corporate gym, training judo. Ivan agreed to join JetRockers if Vasyl buys the drums. Vasyl bought Sonor drums, Ivan joined instantly. Then Galyna Stasiuk joined the band for vocals. This staff performed in 2007 and had big success locally.

Later in 2007 drummer Ivan Lutsyk decided to leave the band as he wanted to develop as a guitar player. Vyacheslav Dyak proposed his colleague drummer Mykola Glibovych. Vasyl interviewed Mykola in summer 2007 with intention to hire to JetLab SBU. Of course, Mykola had to play the drums right in the office just after the interview, and most of present people were surprised that Mykola played so loud. But it was negotiated that Mykola would be ready after the training in SoftServe University, so he joined the band in February 2008.

Then was a time of vocals rotations. Olena Strelchenko used to sing for a while. Eventually JetRockers welcomed Olga Didukh (then she changed her last name to Moroz after her husband). Oleksandr Sukholeyster joined JetRockers as keyboards player. This staff played in 2008 and achieved even better appreciation because of higher quality of both sound and performance.

== Discography ==
- 2007 - AoJaJeNA
- 2008 - Punk Rock over Alcohol
- 2009 - 16 Years

== Band members ==
- Vasyl Mylko - rhythm guitar, lead guitar, vocals (2007–present)
- Serhii Otroshchenko - lead guitar, rhythm guitar (2007–present)
- Andriy Savchyn - bass (2009–present)
- Oleksandr Sukholeyster - keyboards (2007–present)
- Olga Moroz (Olga Didukh) - vocals (2007–present)
- Rustam Iskandarov - drums (2009–present)

=== Former members ===
- Vitaliy Topolnytskyy - drums (2007)
- Ivan Lutsyk - drums (2007)
- Olena Strelchenko - vocals (2008)
- Galyna Stasiuk - vocals (2007)
- Khrystyna Kosyk - vocals (2007)
- Vyacheslav Dyak - vocals (2007–2009)
- Mykola Hlibovych - drums (2008–2009)
- Roman Bilusyak - bass (2007–2009)
