= Viy (band) =

Viy / Вій
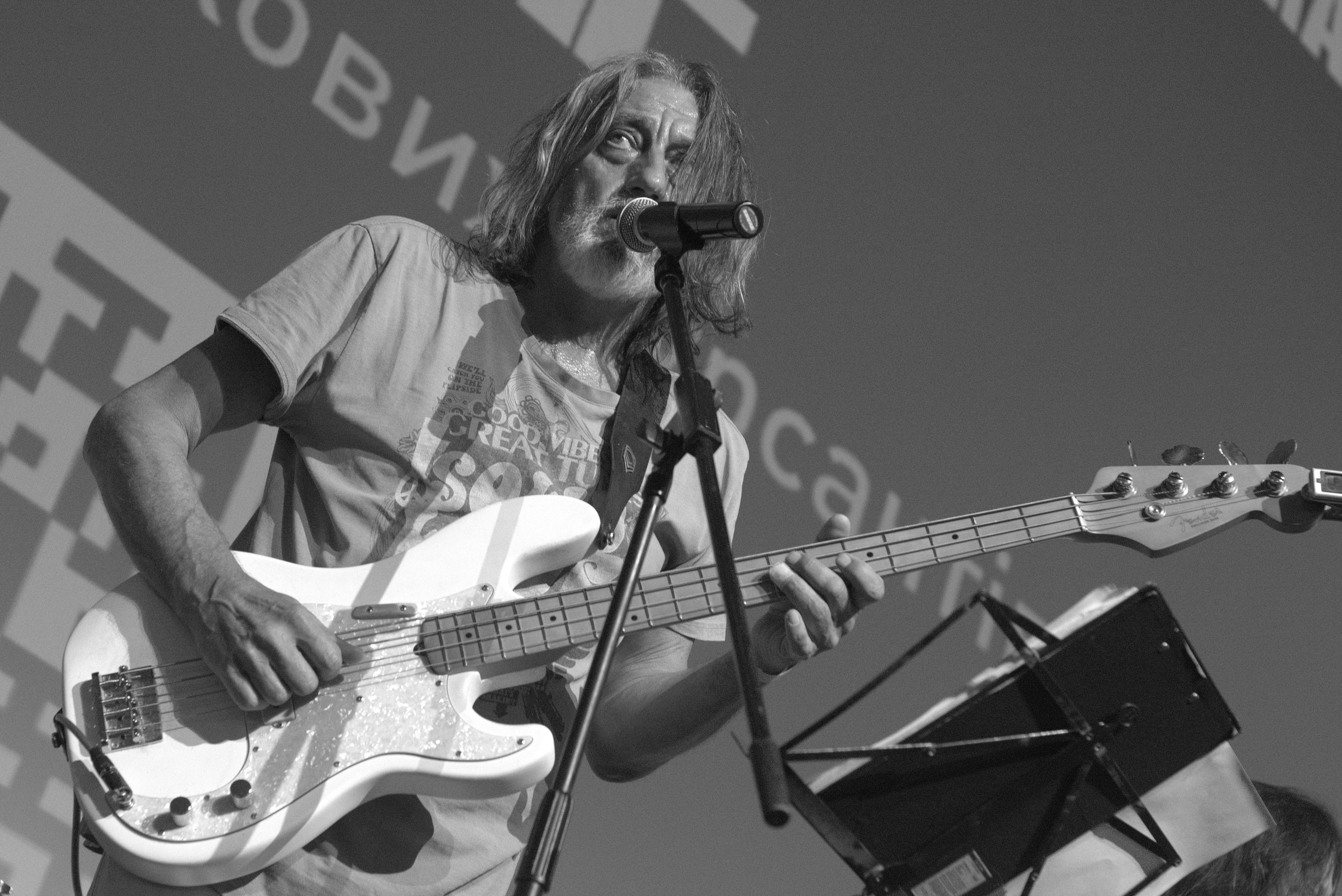
- Band leader Dmytro Dobryi-Vechir during Viy's performance in Kyiv, 2024

Background information
- Origin: Kyiv, Ukraine
- Genres: alternative rock, gothic rock, ethnic
- Years active: 1991 – present
- Members: Dmytro Dobryi-Vechir, Lesya Roy, Oleksandr Hrosman, Dmytro Kruzov, Mykola Rodionov, Anastasiya Klymova
- Past members: V. Nedostup, Ihor Lemeshko, Oleh Kozlov, Dmytro Pidlutskyi, S. Salmanov, Lesia Dobryivechir, O. Vlasiuk (Sashko Lirnyk), Yaroslav Miklukho, Olia Vyazenko, S. Herashchenko, Oleksiy Dovzhok, Ruslan Meleshchenko, O. Meleshchenko, Yu. Zabara, Yuriy Mezenchuk, O. Volynets
- Website: http://viyfromkiev.livejournal.com

Viy (Ukrainian: Вій) is a Ukrainian ethnic-rock band originating from the capital Kyiv. After becoming laureates of the Chervona Ruta festival in 1991 and 1993, in 1995 they were recognized as the best alternative rock band in Ukraine. After their success at Chervona Ruta, in 1994 the band toured Europe, visiting France, Germany, Hungary, Poland and Slovakia. In the following years they took part in numerous music festivals in Ukraine, Poland and Russia. The band is also known for its street performances. In 1995 Viy created a musical production centre, and since 2003 have been recording at their own studio in Kyiv's Young Theatre.

== Musical style ==
Ochi Vidmy
Ochi Vidmy, one of the band's trademark compositions

Viy is known for its alternative rock ballads, which combine elements of Ukrainian paganism, Neo-Baroque and Neo-Gothic music with original texts and melodies. The band's "dark" aesthetics are amplified by mentions of magic and figures of folk demonology in their songs. Their preferred instruments are lira, sopilka, cello, flute, oboe and gongs.

== Discography ==
- Chorna Rillia (Чорна Рілля, 1993/1996/2001)
- JAZZ (instrumental works, 1997)
- Khata Skraiu Sela (Хата скраю села, 2003)
- Chorna Rillia Collector's Edition (Чорна Рілля, 2004)
- Rock Legends of Ukraine - Viy (Рок-легенди України — Вій, 2004)
- Viy Multimedia Encyclopedia (2005)
- Khata Skraiu Sela (Хата скраю села, 2006)
