= Trypilske kolo =

Annual cultural festival in Ukraine

Trypilske Kolo Трипільське коло
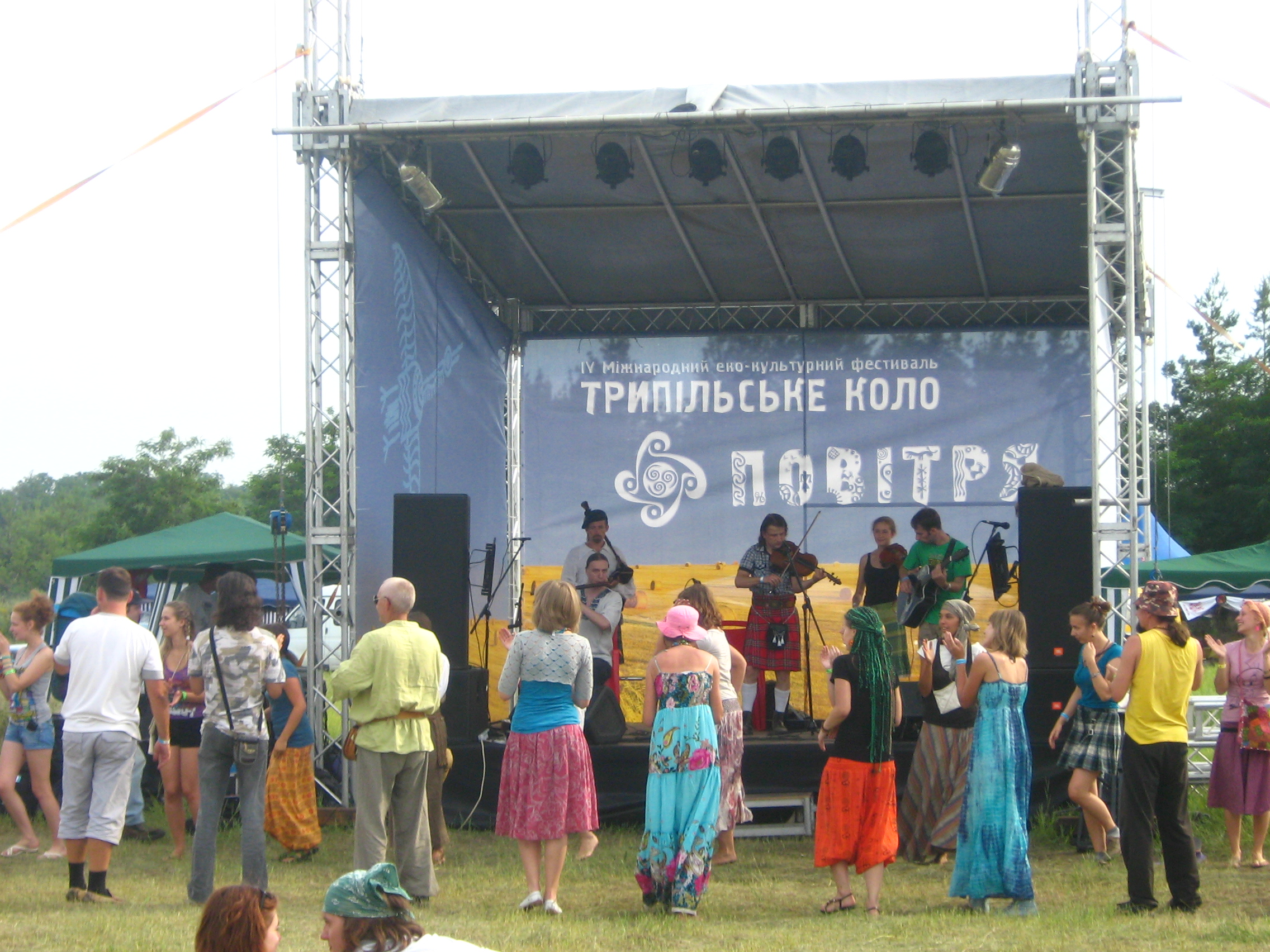
- Trypilske kolo 2011
- Genre: World music
- Dates: End of June
- Locations: Rzhyshchiv, Kyiv region, Ukraine
- Years active: 2008–present

Trypilske kolo (lit. 'Trypillian circle'; Ukrainian: Трипільське коло) is an eco-cultural and world music festival in Ukraine. It takes place annually at the end of June in the city of Rzhyshchiv, on the bank of the Dnieper River, and it has among its primary goals the educational promotion of the ancient Cucuteni-Trypillian culture.
