= Mandry =

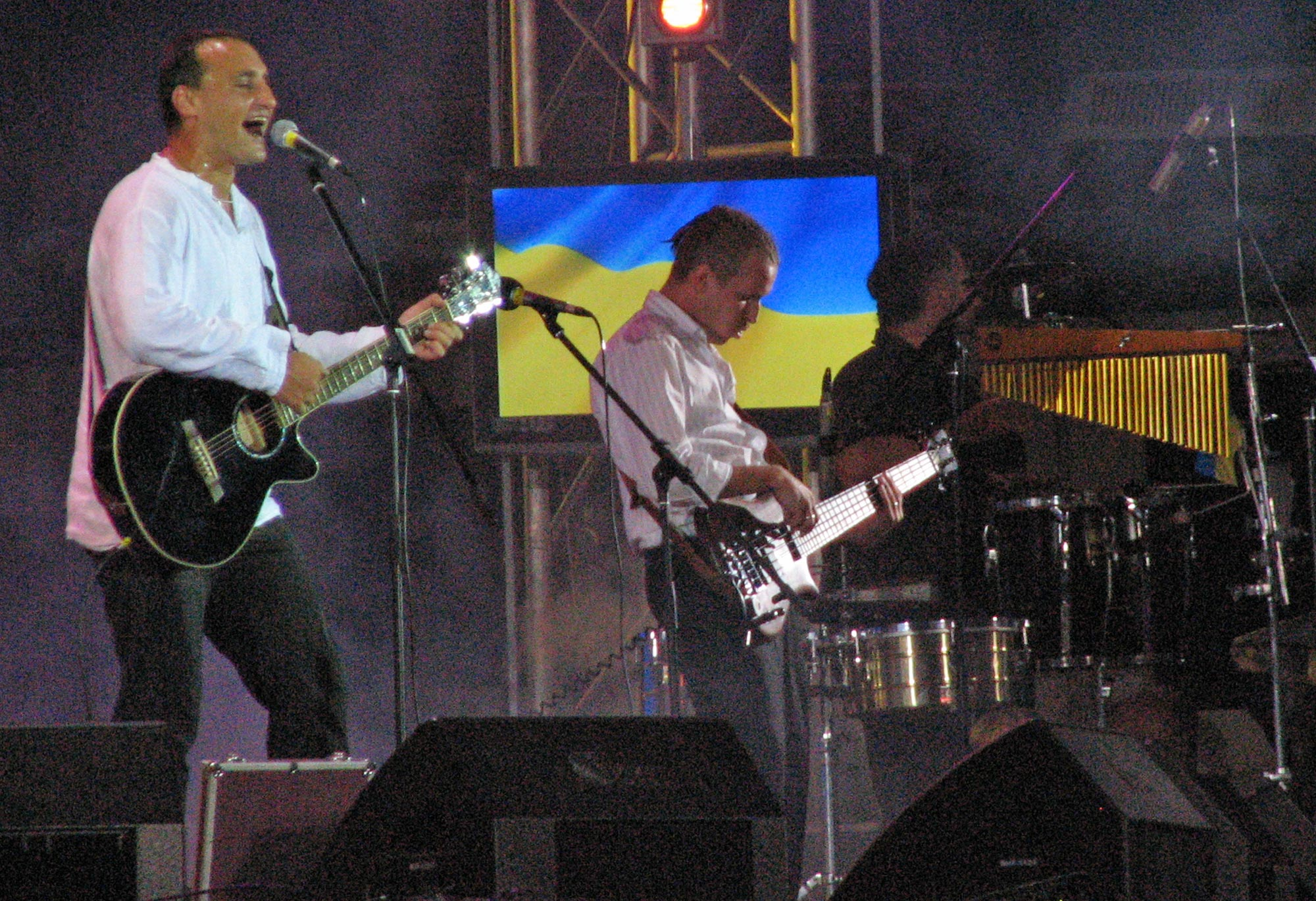
- Mandry at Maidan Nezalezhnosti, Kyiv, Ukraine August 24, 2008.

Background information
- Origin: Kyiv, Ukraine
- Genres: folk-rock
- Years active: 1997–present
- Members: Serhiy "Foma" Fomenko; Leonid "Lyonya" Bieley; Serhiy "Chizh" Chehodayev; Andriy Zanko; Salman Salmanov Mamed-Ohly
- Website: https://www.mandrymusic.com

Mandry (Ukrainian: Мандри, lit. 'Travel', 'Discovery') is a Ukrainian folk-rock/blues/ska band formed in 1998 in Kyiv. The band's vocalist and lead member is Serhiy Fomenko. Their music combines traditional Ukrainian folk music with modern rhythms, influenced by urban life, French chansons, reggae, blues, rock and punk.

== Biography ==
Mandry were formed in 1997 by singer-songwriter Serhiy Fomenko, who had previously been active in the Kyiv underground music scene with the group Den' Vmyraye Rano (Day Dies Early). The band initially performed as a three-piece acoustic band, before several line-up changes, including the addition of accordionist Leonid Bieley in October 1997, percussionist Salman, and drummer Andriy Zanko, and Serhiy Chehodayev replacing Oleksandr Kokhanivsky on bass. As a result of these changes, the band developed a new sound, inspired by contemporary rhythms and French melodic influences, which became known as "folk music of the cities". They performed their first concert with this new style on 24 December 1997.

Around this time the band was offered a contract by the director of Asteroid Records. In the months that followed they recorded their first EP for Asteroid. In August 1998 the band produced their first video, for the song "Romansero pro nizhnu korolevu". In September 1998, the video was placed in the top three in the first All-Ukrainian Music Video Contest, and director Anton Trofimov was also nominated for an award. The EP, containing seven songs and the video clip for "Romansero pro nizhnu korolevu", was released in December 1998. In the same year Mandry played in Lviv, Dnipropetrovsk, Kherson, Donetsk, Minsk and Kyiv.

In January 1999 they filmed their second video in Lviv, for the song "Kartata Sorochka", broadcast on the national TV channel 1+1. In spring 1999 they visited Budapest, Hungary, to participate in a festival commemorating the 50th anniversary of the European Union. In summer they performed at the festivals Rock-Kyiv, PEPSI-SZIGET (Budapest) and Slavianski Bazaar in Vitebsk (Vitebsk). At the end of summer they started filming a video for the song "Rusalky" ("Mermaids").

In April 2000 they released their first full-length album, Romansero pro nizhnu korolevu, on Karavan Records, alongside the video for "Rusalky". In June 2000 Mandry took part in the International Festival of Ukrainian Culture in Sopot, Poland. In September they performed at Rock-Existence festival in Kyiv. In November they released their EP Rusalky on Karavan Records.

From 14 to 26 May 2001 Mandry went on a two-week tour of Poland, playing in Wrocław, Warsaw, Kraków, Szczecin, Gliwice, Białystok, Olsztyn, Sopot and Lublin. At the beginning of November 2001, Creon Music, a French record label, released a compilation called Ukrainian Rock, which included several tracks by Mandry. In March 2002 the video to "Dochka melnyka" ("Miller's daughter") was shown on Ukrainian television.

On 19 May 2002, Mandry joined other Ukrainian groups and artists for a concert at the Hippodrome in London, as part of the Festival of Ukrainian Culture in Great Britain. At the end of September 2002 their first animated video, for the song "Orysya", was shown on Ukrainian television. On 17 October 2002, the band released their second album, Legenda pro Ivanka ta Odarku, in Ukraine on the Lavina Music record label.

On 17 May 2003, the band took part in the international festival "The Day of United Europe" in Kyiv. At the end of August 2003 Mandry started shooting the video for "Vitre Tsyhane" (Gypsy Wind), their first to be shown on the all-Ukrainian M1 music channel that October.

In 2004, Mandry toured extensively in Ukraine in support of Viktor Yushchenko's presidential campaign. During the Orange Revolution protests that followed the disputed election results at the end of 2004, Mandry were one of many bands who performed for the protesters in Kyiv's Maidan Nezalezhnosti (Independence Square).

In 2005 the band recorded their album Doroha, released in February 2006. At that time they were performing at many folk festivals and concerts in Ukraine and neighbouring countries.

In March 2006 they filmed a new video to their song "Ne spy moya ridna zemlya" (Don't sleep my native land), with imagery depicting Ukraine's history and its heroes.

== Current members ==
- Serhiy "Foma" Fomenko - main vocals, guitar, sopilka (tin whistle)
- Leonid "Lyonya" Bieley - accordion, synthesizer, backing vocals
- Serhiy "Chizh" Chehodayev - bass, backing vocals
- Andriy Zanko - drums, backing vocals
- Salman Salmanov Mamed-Ohly - percussion, backing vocals

== Discography ==
=== Singles ===
- 1998 - "Mandry" (Мандри)
- 2000 - "Rusalky" (Русалки)

=== Albums ===
- 2000 - Romansero pro nizhnu korolevu (Романсеро про ніжну королеву) (re-released in 2002)
- 2002 - Lehenda pro Ivanka ta Odarku (Легенда про Івана та Одарку)
- 2006 - Doroha (Дорога)

=== Live albums ===
- 2007 - Mandry u Krayini Mriy (Мандри у Країні Мрій)
