= Haydamaky (band) =

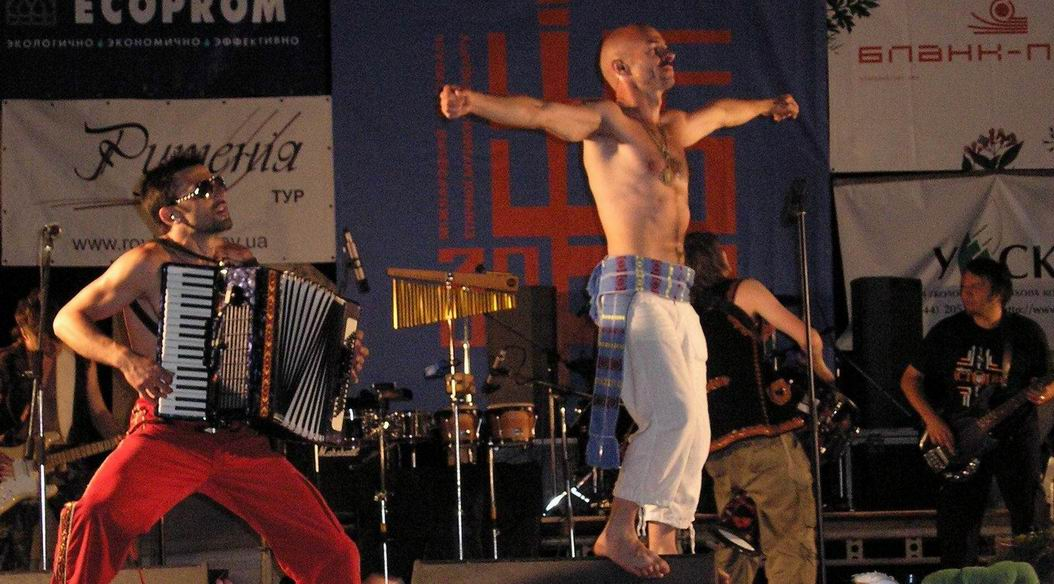
The Haydamaky on ethnic festival Sheshory, Ukraine, 2005

Haydamaky (Ukrainian: Гайдамаки) is a Ukrainian folk rock band formed in 1991. The music of Haydamaky is inspired by various ethnic music from around the world, especially from various regions of Ukraine, such as Polesia, Bukovina, and Transcarpathia. Other influences include the Romanian folklore, punk music sound of Shane MacGowan and by the reggae of such bands like Burning Spear and Black Uhuru. The name refers to haidamakas, 18th century Ukrainian paramilitary and rebels.

== History ==
The Haydamaky began their career in 1991, shortly after Ukraine declared its independence from the Soviet Union. Then the band was known as Aktus, and played mostly local gigs in the underground Kyiv music scene. Without a fertile, popular local music scene, Aktus turned to the sounds of reggae, ska, and punk music for a fresh alternative. Members of the band were also attracted to the political impact that these genres had on their society. The idea was that through music significant social change could be possible. This gave a greater purpose to the performance of such musical styles. The discovery of these musical genres later became the key to their own realization of a specifically Ukrainian musical style. Haydamaky's hope is to forge an inherently Ukrainian popular music style, which looks back to its own heritage and traditions as a source for inspiration.

With the addition of sopilka-vocalist Oleksandr Yarmola and accordionists Ivan Lenyo, both known and respected in folk circles, the band increasingly incorporated elements of Ukrainian folk music into their compositions.

During the early 1990s Aktus has engaged in constant touring of Europe. Unlike most popular Ukrainian music groups who propagate Soviet style Estrada, Aktus sought to introduce elements of Ukrainian folk music through a cross-cultural mix including Reggae and Ska.

EMI international records of London discovered the group in Kyiv in early 2001. Akta signed immediately to their label. At that time the band realized it was time to establish a stronger tie to their own culture. They changed their name to Haydamaky, in honor of the eighteenth-century Haydamak rebellion against the Polish szlachta.

During the last years the band has participated in various festivals such as:

- TFF Rudolstadt – 2003 (Germany)
- "Litoměřický kořen" – 2002, 2003 (Czech Republic)
- "Viljandi Folk" – 2003 (Estonia)
- "Sziget" festival – 2009 in Budapest (Hungary)
- "Pohoda" festival – 2001, 2002 in Trenčín
- "Huntenpop" – 2008 (Netherlands)
- "Tilburg Mundial" – 2007 (Netherlands)
- "Amsterdamm Roots" – 2007 (Netherlands)
- "Volt Festival" – 2010 (Hungary), just to name a few.

Haydamaky have recently performed at many club venues across Europe, including as a special guest at a concert of Asian Dub Foundation in Bratislava, Slovakia. Other club appearances this year were held in Germany, Estonia, Poland, Czech Republic, Slovakia, and Moscow.

In April 2004 the band released their second album "Bohuslav". This time the group searched even deeper into Ukrainian folk music for material, ideas, and textures. The ensemble has invited violinist Vasyl Hekker, perhaps the foremost authority on authentic Ukrainian folk violin style, to collaborate on the project. Banduryst-Guitarist Jurij Fedynskyj, of New York City has relocated to Kyiv to join the ensemble. Also Ukrainian freestyle banduryst Roman Hrynkiv participated. And the band invited two young ladies from authentic Ukrainian choir "Bozhychi": Natalia Serbina and Masha Firsova, to do the back – vocals on the most of songs of the album. The "Bohuslav" promo is just on. In June Haydamaky are off on a huge concert tour, which starts by their concert in "Mazepa Fest" (Poltava, Ukraine) and will continue through the summer in Estonia, Poland, Czech Republic, Slovakia and Romania.

In October 2006 at the WOMEX World Music Expo held in Seville Spain, Haydamaky's release of their CD entitled Ukraine Calling released by Eastblok Music earlier that year broke into the top twenty of the World Music Charts Europe.

Less than a year and a half later the follow-up CD Kobzar once again on EMI/Eastblok Music, made headway on in the World Music Charts Europe when it made to seventh place in March 2008. In 2008 albom "Voo Voo i Haydamaky" recorded in collaboration with Polish veteran rock band Voo Voo gained "golden" status in Poland. Since then the group are constantly touring. In 2012 Haydamaky are recording a new album.

Band members at present:

- Oleksander Iarmola - vocals, lyrics
- Andrij Slepcow - guitar
- Dmytro Kirichok - bass
- Dmytro Kushnir - drums
- Roman Dubonos - trumpet
- Maksym Boyko - trombone

Past members:

- Ruslan Ovras - drums (2001-2009)
- Ruslan Troshchynsky- trombone(2001-2004)
- Ivan Leno - accordion, cymbals, vocals (2001-2012)
- Volodymyr Sherstiuk - bass, Jew's harp (2001-2012)
- Wlad Pawlow – guitar (2001-2002)
- Wlad Grymalskyj – midi (2001-2004)
- Oleksandr Demyanenko - guitar, mandolin (2002-2012)
- Eugene Didyk - trumpet (2004-2009)
- Sergij Brawarniuk – percussion (2004-2006)
- Oleksandr Charkin - trombone (2008-2012)
- Sergii Soloviy - trumpet (2009-2012)
- Sergii Borysenko - drums (2009-2012)
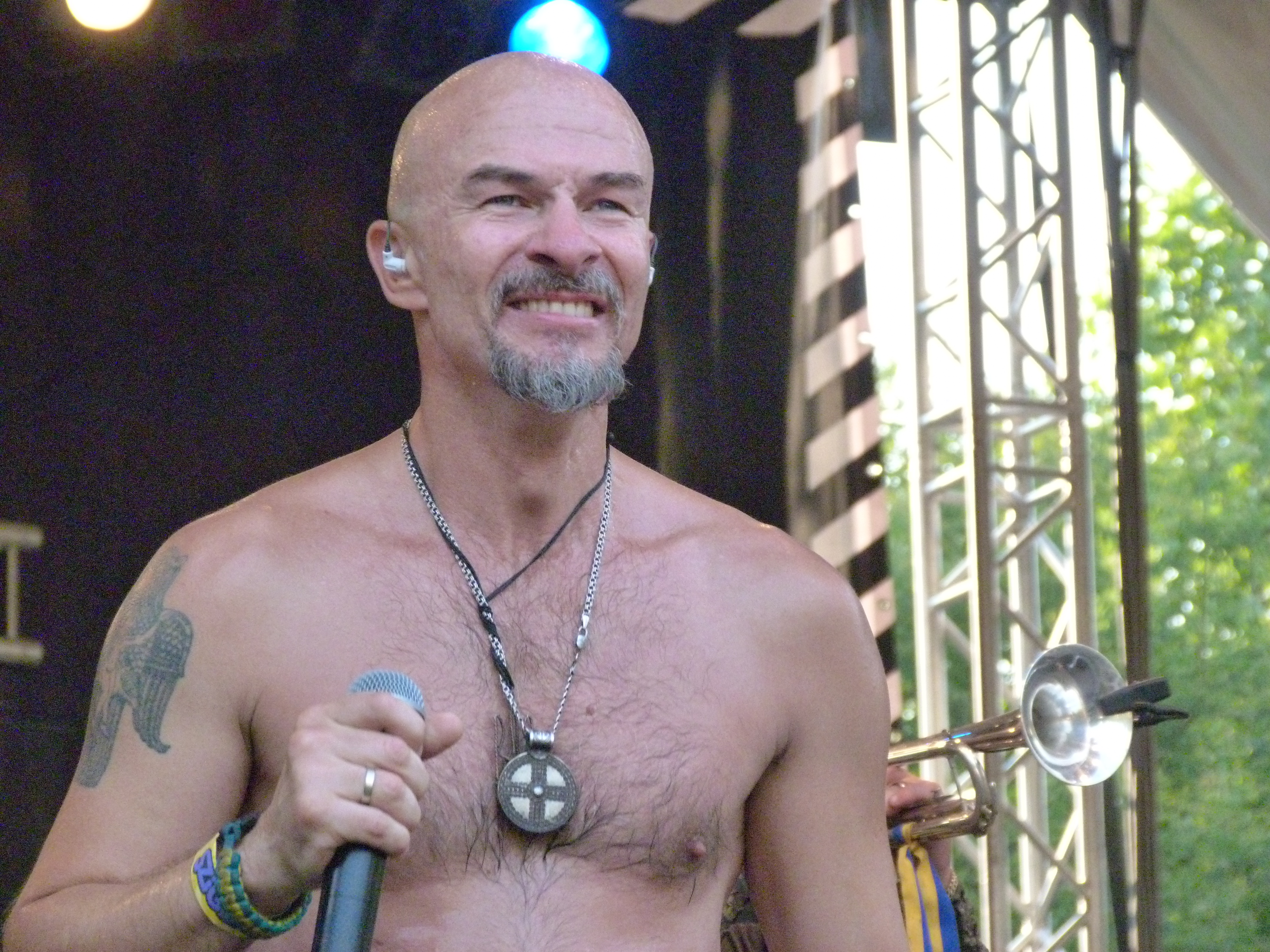
Haydamaky at Sziget Festival 2015

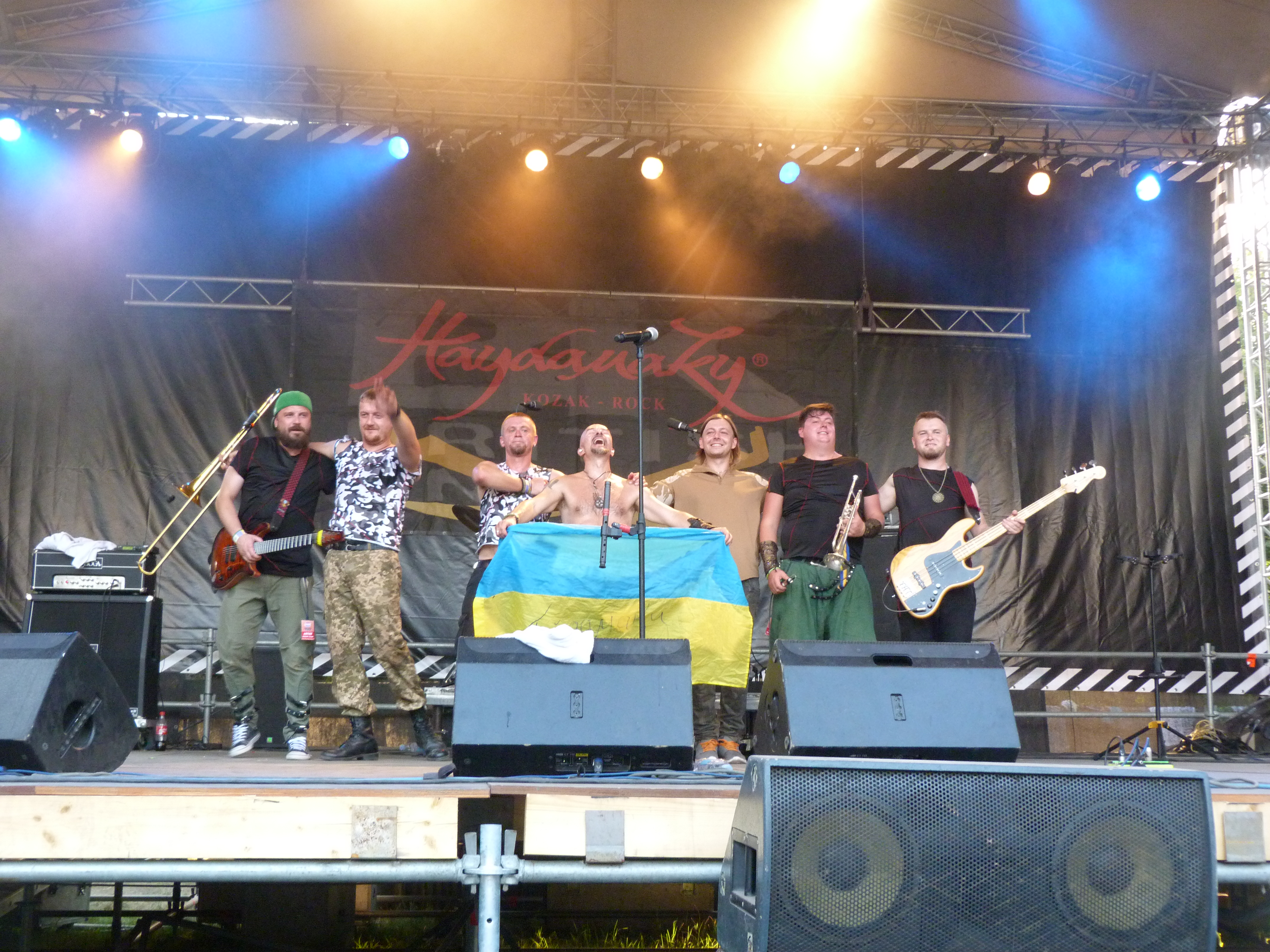
Haydamaky at Sziget Festival 2015

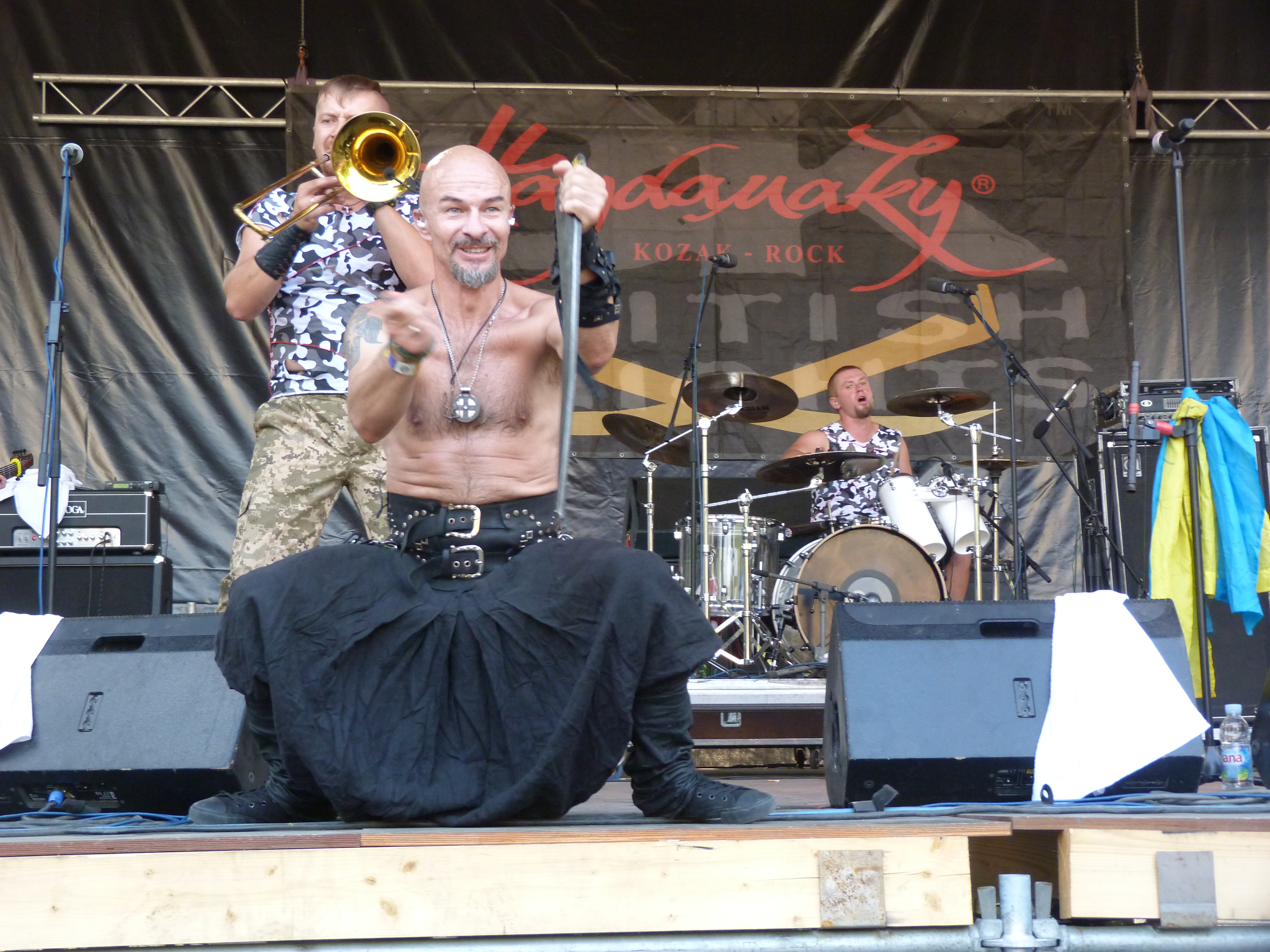
Haydamaky at Sziget Festival 2015

== Albums ==
- 2002 – Haydamaky (Гайдамаки, COMP Music/EMI)
- 2004 – Bohuslav (Богуслав, COMP Music/EMI)
- 2005 – Perverziya (Перверзія, COMP Music/EMI)
- 2006 – Ukraine Calling (Eastblok Music, Germany)
- 2008 – Kobzar (Кобзар, Eastblok Music, Germany)
- 2008 – Haydamaky Kobzar-Prolog (AntenaKrzyku/Lou&RockedBoys, Poland)
- 2009 – Voo Voo i Haydamaky (AGORA/KitonArt, Poland)
- 2012 – No More Peace (Lou & Rocked Boys, Poland)

== Compilations ==
- 1996 – Guitars, hearts and garnets (HARBA, Ukraine)
- 1998 – No One Comprehends (KOKA, Poland)
- 1998 – Rock-Existence 1997 (ART-VELES, Ukraine)
- 2000 – Rock-Existence 2000 (ART-VELES, Ukraine)
- 2000 – The Legends of the Chimerical Land (JRC, Ukraine)
- 2000 – United Colours of SKA (Pork Pie/Vielklang, Germany)
- 2002 – Pohoda Festival 1997-2001 (Agentúra Pohoda, Slovakia)
- 2002 – Dobryi vechir, tobi (Christmas compilation) (COMP Music/EMI)
- 2004 – TFFRudolstadt 2003
