= Esthetic Education =

Ukrainian rock band

- Origin: Kyiv, Ukraine
- Genres: Indie rock, alternative rock, progressive rock
- Website: www.estheticeducation.com

Esthetic Education is a rock band based in Kyiv, Ukraine. Its present members are Louis Franck (vocals), Dmytro Shurov (keyboards), Yuriy Khustochka (bass), Illya Halushko (guitars), and Andriy Nadolsky (drums). It was formed in 2004 after Shurov and Khustochka left the successful Ukrainian rock band Okean Elzy.

== History ==
In December 2004, a young band released the debut album 'Face Reading', Ukrainian Records. Esthetic Education played at the Bars en Trans Festival in the La Scene club in Paris. They also played at the Dublin Castle and the Spitz in London. The Spitz chose the song “Horrible Disaster” for inclusion in their limited edition CD Spitz Live 2.

The band was extremely active in 2005–2006; they shot three video clips and released a maxi single on the Ukrainian record label Lavina Records.

During 2005 and a half of 2006, Esthetic Education played in front of more than 170,000 people. They opened for Moby in the Palace of Sports, Kyiv (the hall where the Eurovision song contest was held) and had bottles, lighters and other objects hurled at them while playing at the Mega House Festival in Moscow. They played an epic concert at Exit Festival in Yugoslavia, toured Ukraine's largest cities and played in Moscow's best clubs and festivals. They also did a series of intimate acoustic concerts in small exclusive Moscow and Ukrainian venues.

In 2006 they released a live album Live at Ring, which featured songs both from Face Reading and Werewolf, which at the time, was their upcoming album. On Russia's biggest label, Soyuz, the band is featured with “Stereolab”, “Be Your Own Pet”, “The Young Gods”, “I Am Kloot”, and “Natasha Atlas”. Their video clip “Leave us Alone” was featured on MTV Russia and their song “Machine” was number one on the hit parade of Ukraine's leading music channel M1, and number 2 on Radio Maximum, Russia's most popular radio station. They have been voted Ukraine's best new band and discovery of the year by several magazines.

Esthetic Education has been invited on numerous TV and radio shows. Highlights include live shooting for Russia's third national channel TVC in Studio 5 at Mosfilm studios, a New Year's TV show for Ukraine's national television channel 1+1 (complete with fireworks, flames, and confetti), a live performance for Novyi Kanal (the equivalent of the United Kingdom's channel 4) during the morning news program, and Prosto Radio's “Golden Best” program, Radio Maximum.

Photos of Esthetic Education have appeared in Elle, Cosmopolitan, Rolling Stone, Ego, Max, Afisha (cover shot), Moloko (cover shot), Time Out, Shtushka, Pink, TV Week, and others.

In 2007 the band released Werewolf. They have opened their own production company in Kyiv, Esthetic Music.

== Discography ==
=== Studio albums ===
- Face Reading (2004)
- Werewolf (2007)

=== Singles ===
- "Leave Us Alone / Machine" (2005)
- "Happy New Year" (2005)
- "Vasil Vasiltsiv" (2006)

=== Live albums ===
- Live at Ring (2006)
