= Sestrychka Vika =

Ukrainian singer (born 1961)

Sestrychka Vika Сестричка Віка
- Born: Viktoriya Vradiy; 8 February 1961 (age 65); Lviv, Ukrainian SSR, Soviet Union (now Ukraine)
- Genres: Rock
- Occupation: Singer
- Instrument: Vocals
- Years active: 1976–present

Sestrychka Vika (Note: Ukrainian: Сестричка Віка, romanized: Sestrychka Vika) (born Viktoriya Vradiy, (Note: Ukrainian: Вікторія Врадій, romanized: Viktoriia Vradii) February 8, 1961) is a Ukrainian rock singer.

== Biography ==
Vika first appeared on the professional stage as a schoolgirl, and in 1976, she became a soloist of VIA "Arnica". Her repertoire included Ukrainian pop songs, two of which were released on the minion of the Melody company. Later, while studying at the Lviv University, she was the soloist of Yuriy Varum's jazz-rock band Labyrinth. In 1985, together with the band, he moved to the city of Gorky. In 1986, she took part in the recording of music for the film Higher Than Rainbow, recording two songs by Yuri Chernavsky together with Mikhail Boyarsky. In 1989, she worked together with the Hadyukin Brothers. At the Chervona Ruta festival, Vika Vradiy, known as Sestrychka Vika (Sister Vika), won first place in the category of rock performers. The singer's first album, "Mom, I'm Stupid", was released on CD by the company "SP Kobza (Ukraine-Canada)".

Vika graduated from the Gnessin State Musical College. She also starred in the main role in Volodymyr Denysenko's film "Mana". In January 1992, she received the title of "Miss Rock Europe". After that, she recorded the albums "On the Cymbals" and "Lviv Stob", and in July 1993, she went to the United States with concerts and stayed in New York with her son. After that, she divorced her husband, Volodymyr Bebeshko, who returned to Ukraine after a short stay in USA. She mainly performed in famous clubs with American musicians, and also worked as a best man-companion for American rappers. She married three more times, all marriages ended in divorce.

In 2004, Vika returned to Ukraine, where her son had returned earlier. She thought of renewing her musical activities in Ukraine, but after a short stay, she returned to the United States in 2006 and lives in Los Angeles.

== Discography ==
- 1990 – Mamo, ya durna (Mom, I'm Stupid)
- 1992 – Vika
- 1992 – Lvivskyy styob (Lviv Stob)
- 1996 – Po tsymbalam (On cymbals)
- 2000 – Tyndy-ryndy Forever
- 2001 – Ameryka, holi babý (America, naked women)
- 2003 – Vika Vradiy
