= Dead Rooster =

Ukrainian band

Dead Rooster Мертвий Півень
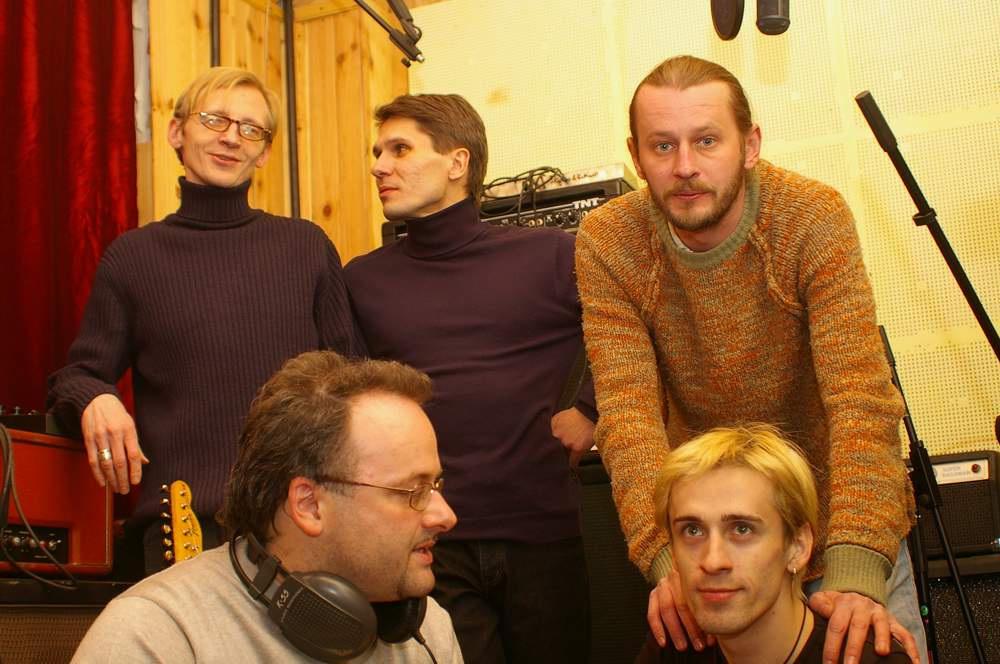

Background information
- Origin: Lviv, Ukraine
- Genres: Rock, progressive rock, punk rock, folk
- Years active: 1989–2011, since 2023
- Members: Roman Chayka; Oleh Suk; Alex Slobodian; Yurko Chopyk; Marian Kozovy, Yurii Roketskyi
- Past members: Andriy Pyatakov; Serfym Pozdnyakov; Vadym Balayan; Lyubomyr Futorsky (deceased); Andriy Nadolsky; Yaryna Yakubyak; Roman Ross; Ivan Nebesnyy; Andriy Pidkivka; Misko Barbara (deceased)
- Website: www.deadrooster.org.ua

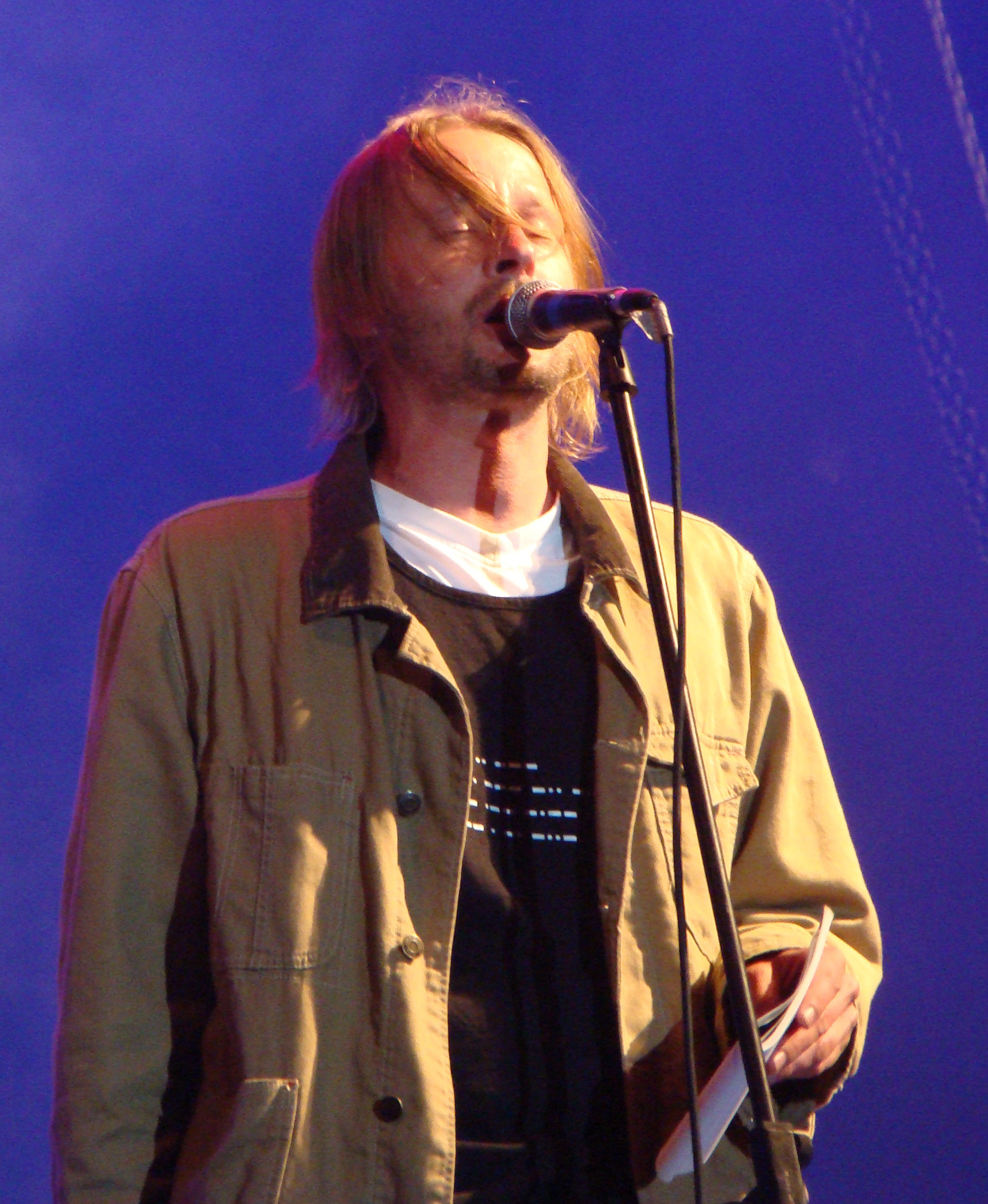
Misko Barbara, lead vocalist.

Dead Rooster or Mertvy Piven (Ukrainian: Мертвий Півень) is a Ukrainian rock band that was formed by Lyubomyr Futorsky in 1989. The first concert was held in 1990 at the first Vyvykh festival. Their debut album Eto was recorded in 1991, at the end of the Chervona Ruta festival, where the group took first prize in the category of performers' art songs. Dead Rooster began as an acoustic band. During the second half of the 1990s, they evolved into a grunge/art-rock band, though their music cannot be described by one particular style. Dead Rooster has changed personnel several times.

Many of the band's songs used lyrics from Ukrainian poets, including Yuri Andrukhovych, Maksym Rylsky, Oleksandr Irvanets, Viktor Neborak, Yurko Pozayak, Serhiy Zhadan, Natalka Bilotserkivets, Ihor Kalynets and Taras Shevchenko. The album Pisni Mertvoho Pivnya is based on Andrukhovych's poetry collection of the same name.

In 2009, their song "Kiss" ("Potsilunok") was featured in the soundtrack of Cold Souls, an American film directed by Sophie Barthes.

On May 22, 2023, at the concert "Bird. Serhiy Zhadan and Friends" the band appeared after a 12-year break with new vocalist Yurii Roketskyi.

== Name origin ==
The history of the band's name is connected with the Stary Lviv cafe, where they often met. At the entrance to the institution hung a weather vane (an iron figure of a rooster), which they called dead. Hence, the idea of the name "Dead Rooster" arose.

== Members ==
Current

- Roman Chayka
- Oleh Suk
- Alex Slobodian
- Yurko Chopyk
- Maryan Kozovyy
- Yurii Roketskyi

Past

- Andriy Pyatakov
- Serfym Pozdnyakov
- Vadym Balayan
- Lyubomyr Futorsky (died 2023)
- Andriy Nadolsky
- Yaryna Yakubyak
- Roman Ross
- Ivan Nebesnyy
- Andriy Pidkivka
- Misko Barbara (died 2021)

== Discography ==
1. 1992 – Ето (Eto)
2. 1993 – Мертвий півень '93 ('Dead Rooster '93')
3. 1994 – Підземне зоо (1994) 'Live in studio (Pidzemne zoo (1994) Studio Live')
4. 1995 – Live у Львові ('Live in Lviv')
5. 1996 – IL Testamento
6. 1997 – Міський бог Ерос (Misky Boh Eros)
7. 1998 – Шабадабада (Shabadabada)
8. 2003 – Афродизіяки (Afrodiziaky)
9. 2006 – Пісні Мертвого Півня (Pisni Mertvoho Pivnya)
10. 2008 – Кримінальні сонети (Kryminalni Sonety)
11. 2008 – Вибраний народом (Vybrany narodom)
12. 2009 – Made in ЮА ('Made in UA')
13. 2011 – Радіо Афродита (Radio Afrodyta)

== See also ==
- Bohdan Lohvynenko
