= Zoltan Almashi =

Ukrainian cellist and composer

Zoltan Almashi Зо́лтан А́лмаші
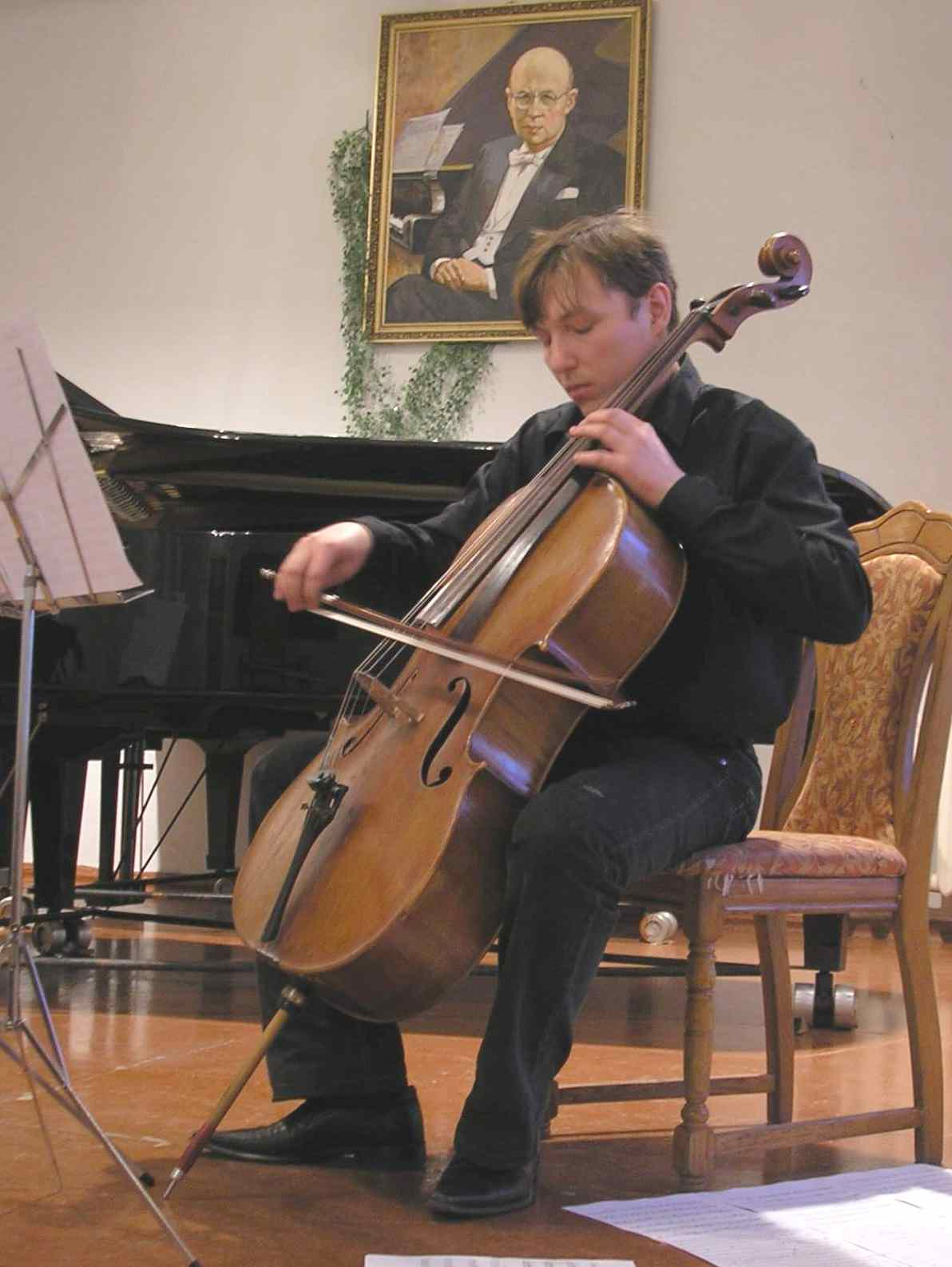
- Almashi in 2007
- Born: 22 January 1975 (age 51); Lviv, Ukrainian SSR
- Education: Lviv National Music Academy; Kyiv Conservatoire
- Occupations: Cellist; Composer
- Organizations: Kyiv Camerata

Zoltan Almashi (Зо́лтан А́лмаші, born 22 January 1975) is a Ukrainian cellist and composer, whose music has been performed internationally. He has played with the Kyiv Camerata.

== Life and career ==
Almashi was born in Lviv, then in the Ukrainian SSR, into a musical family. He studied at the Lviv National Music Academy where he graduated in cello in 1998 and in composition, with Yurii Laniuk, in 1999. He studied further at the Ukrainian National Tchaikovsky Academy of Music with Yevhen Stankovych, from 2002.

Almashi has played with the ensemble Kyiv Camerata, among others. He has participated in festivals as both a performer and a composer, including the Kyiv Music Fest, Two Days and Two Nights of New Music, Premieres of the Season and Kontrasty. His composition Maria's City, a work named for the city of Mariupol, was played by Youth Symphony Orchestra of Ukraine conducted by Oksana Lyniv as part of their 2024 spring tour. A reviewer from the Frankfurter Allgemeine Zeitung noted that it expresse "lament, aggression and hope". He is a member of the National Union of Composers of Ukraine.

Almashi received the Levko Revutsky award in 2003.

== Works ==
Almashi has focused on instrumental music such as concertos for soloists and chamber orchestra, especially chamber music. His works include:

1. Symphony of Dialogues
2. Missa brevis, for chamber choir and chamber orchestra
3. Maria's City, for chamber orchestra
