= Khreshchatyk Choir =

Ukrainian musical ensemble

- Academic Chamber Choir
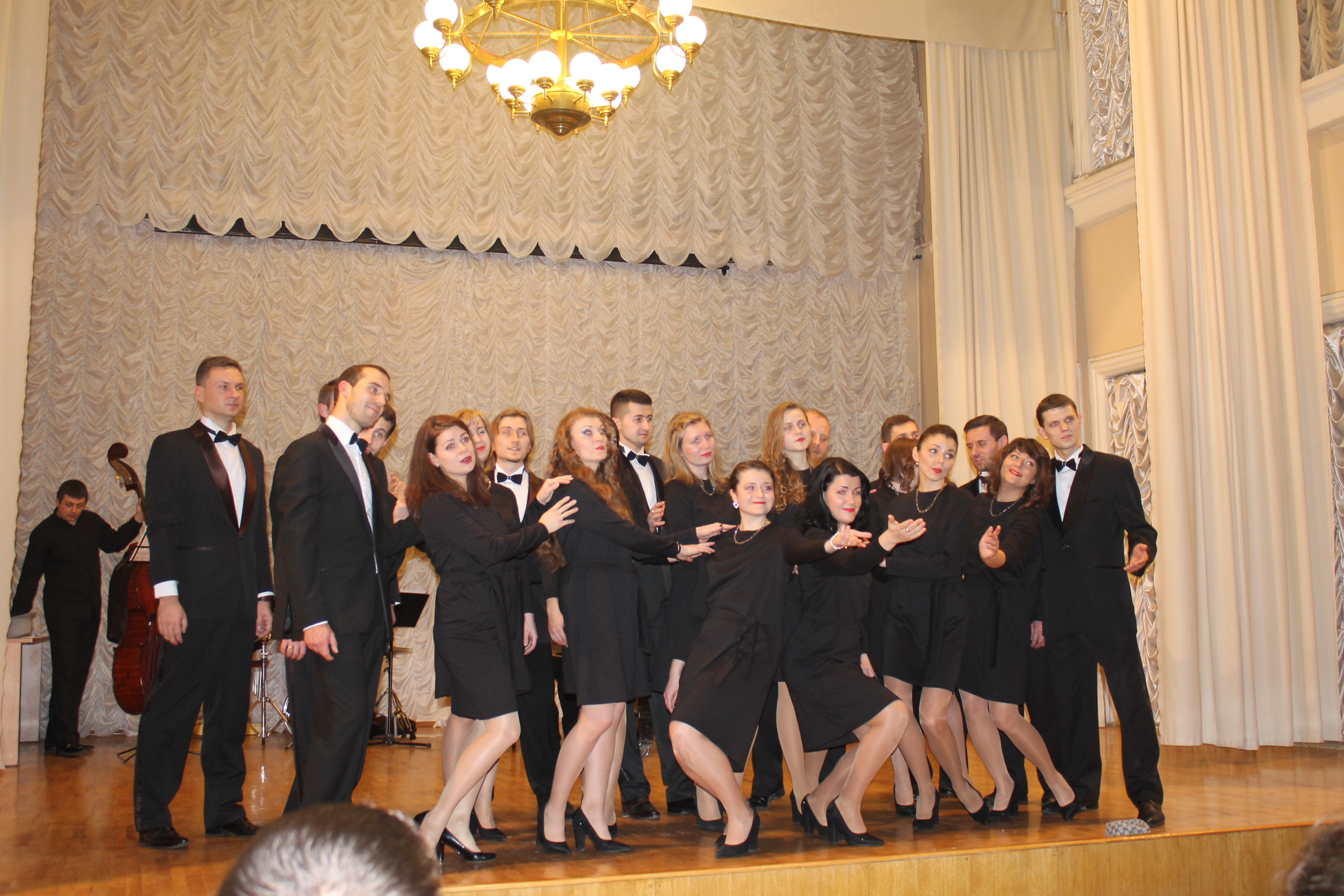
- Photo from a 2016 concert, "Hits from Here"
- Founded: 1994
- Founder: Larisa Buhonskaya
- Genre: folk, classical
- Headquarters: Ukraine (Kyiv)
- Website: www.bestchoir.kiev.ua

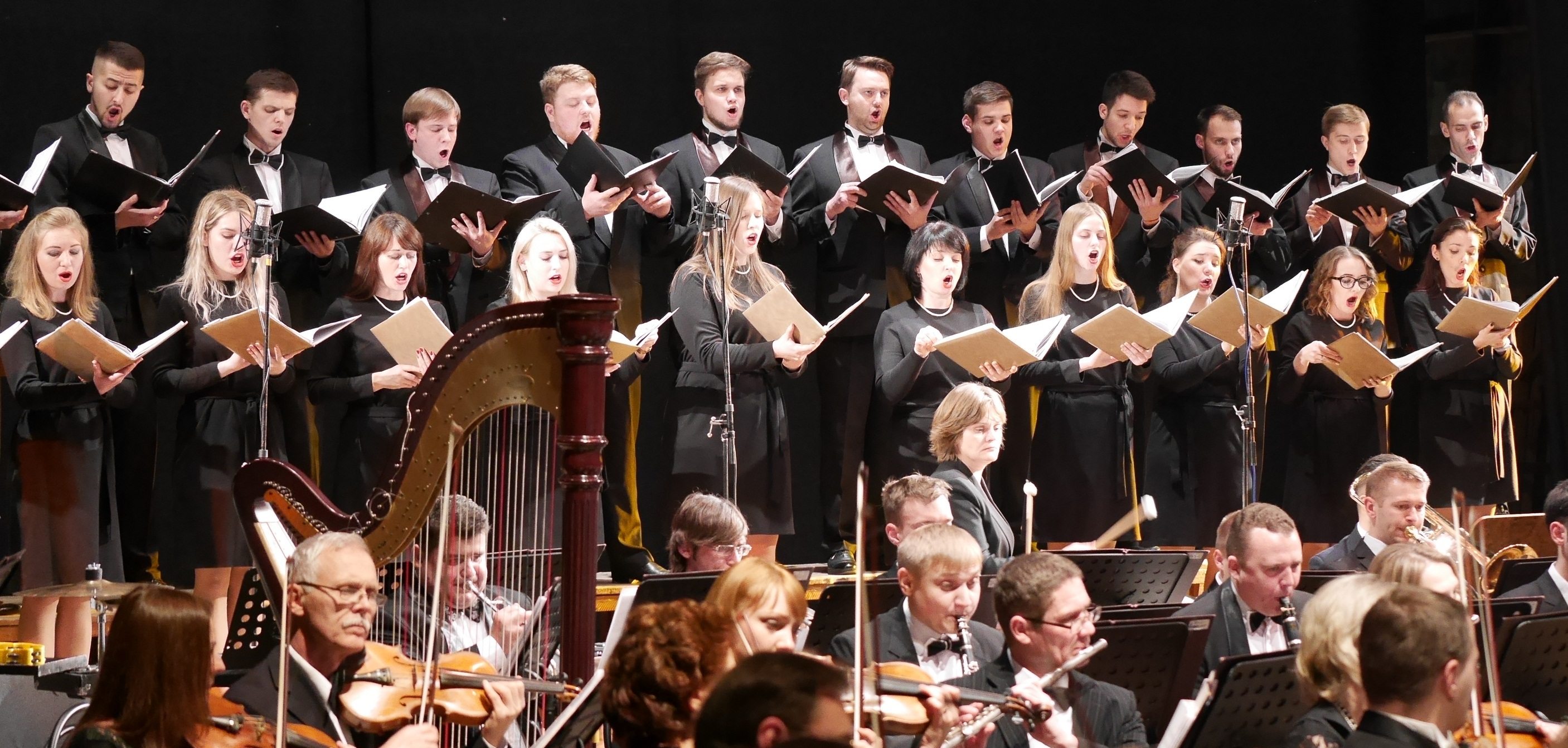
The Khreshchatyk Choir in the middle of a concert

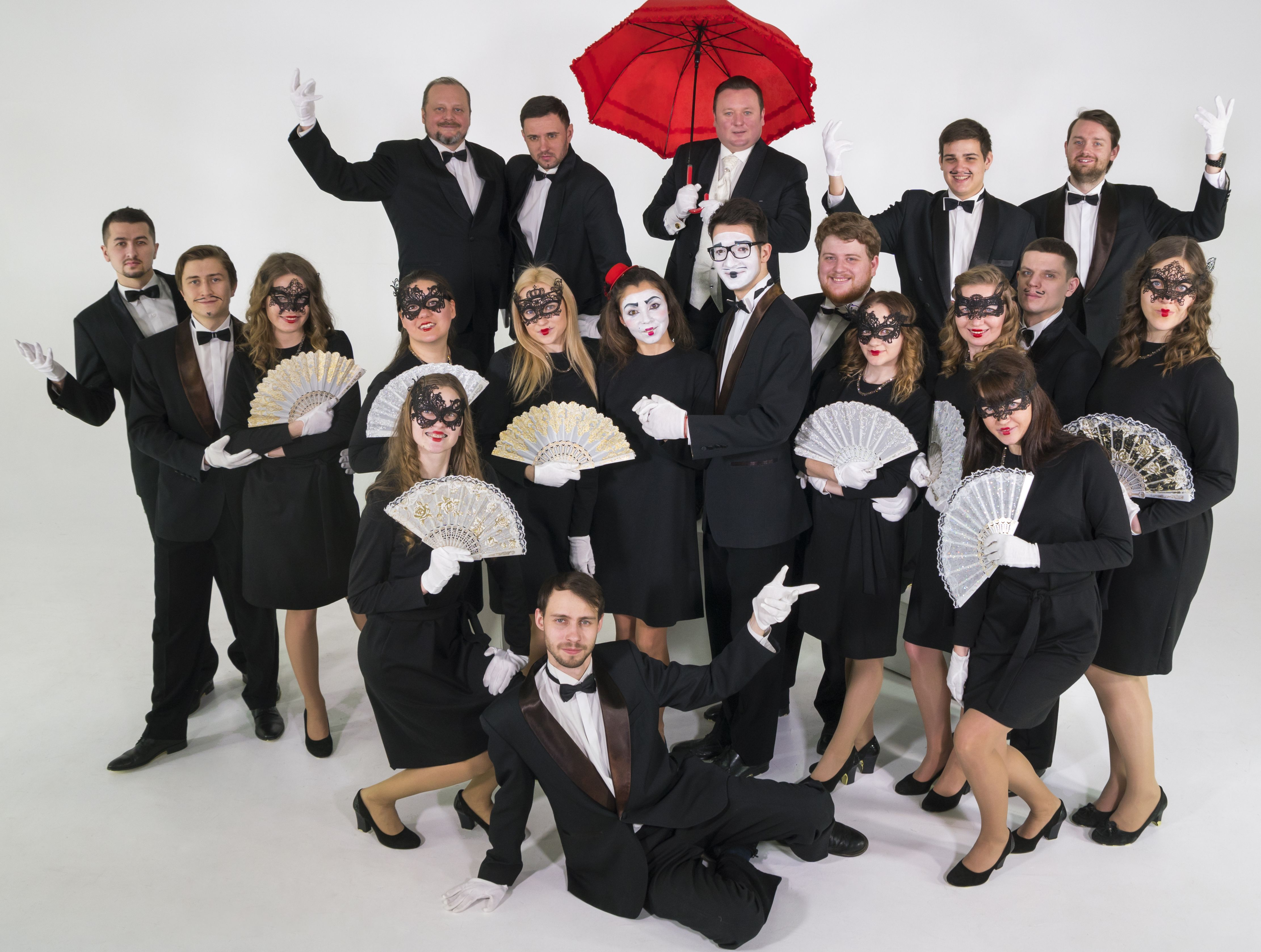
Ensemble of the "Choir Smiles" program

The Khreshchatyk Choir is a musical ensemble based in Kyiv, Ukraine, named for the central street of the city.

== History ==
The Khreshchatyk Choir was founded in March 1994 by Larisa Buhonskaya, who led the choir until 2007. The choir's premiere performance took place on April 9, 1994, at the Ukrainian National Tchaikovsky Academy of Music.

Until 1999, the choir existed only in an amateur sense, but thanks to a successful debut and success in international competitions, it quickly gained recognition in professional circles. The ensemble specialized in spiritual Ukrainian music by contemporary composers such as Lesia Dychko, Yevhen Stankovych, Myroslav Skoryk, and Hanna Gavrylets.

In 1999, the choir officially received municipal status and Bukhonskaya assumed the position of director. In 2001, the choir was included in a list of leading creative teams of Ukraine by the Ministry of Culture. In March 2007, the choir was awarded the Mykola Vitaliyovych Lysenko Prize and directory Bukhonskaya was awarded the title of "Honored Artist of Ukraine".

In June 2007, due to a conflict with the mayor of Kyiv, Leonid Chernovetskyi, over the allocation of land for a new room for the choir, Bukhonska was forced to resign as director.

In 2007, the choir has been directed by Pavlo Struts, a graduate of the Kyiv Conservatory. In 2009, the choir was awarded academic status, and since January 2011 its official name has been the Khreschatyk Academic Chamber Choir.

== Activities ==
The ensemble primarily performs modern works by Ukrainian composers. It regularly participates in festivals organized by the National Union of Composers of Ukraine such as the "Premieres of the Season", "Kyiv Music Fest", and "Golden-Domed Kyiv".

Over the course of 1996 to 2004, the choir performed more than 500 works, 200 of which were premiers. In 2006, it performed its first theatrical production. By 2017, the choir had performed 800 works, 300 of which were premiers.

Since 2015, the choir began expanding the type of music it performed, beginning to sing popular music as well as Ukrainian songs. Emulating show choirs, the Khreshchatyk Choir ran a concert series called "Hits from Everywhere" which included covers of songs by ABBA, Muse, Okean Elzy, and others.

== Bibliography ==
- Dondyk, O.I., Stages of creativity of the academic chamber choir "Khreschatyk" / Academic choral art of Ukraine (history, theory, practice, education): collective monograph / [ed. OM Ligus]. Kyiv: Lira-K Publishing House, 2017, pp. 101–106.
- Dondyk, O.I., The specifics of the repertoire of the academic chamber choir "Khreschatyk" in the context of the development of Ukrainian choral music at the turn of XX–XXI centuries / Academic choral art of Ukraine (history, theory, practice, education): collective monograph / [ed. OM Ligus]. Kyiv: Lira-K Publishing House, 2017, pp. 107–112.
