= Man-Ching Donald Yu =

Hong Kong classical composer (born 1980)

Yu Man Ching (born 16 November 1980) (Chinese: 余文正) is a contemporary classical composer.

== Life and career ==
Man-Ching Yu Donald was born in Hong Kong in 1980. He studied at Baylor University (U.S.) in 2000 and later at Hong Kong Baptist University where he obtained his Ph.D. in composition and theory in 2010; additionally, he studied composition with scholarship at the Mozarteum International Summer Academy with diploma in 2017. As a prolific composer, he has written nearly two hundred works in different genres ranging from chamber music, choral works, chamber opera to large-scale symphonic works. His music has been commissioned and performed by various orchestras, choruses, and ensembles worldwide in more than 20 countries with 50 cities at various international festivals and venues throughout the North and South America, Europe, and Asia such as the Kontrasty, Two Days and Two Nights of New Music, Kyiv Music Fest, and others.

His music is extensively published by Donemus (Holland) and Universal Edition (Wien), as well as recorded on various CD labels including Phasma Music, Ablaze, Albany Records.

The orchestral work "Unravelling" composed by Yu won the Gold Award for Contemporary Classical Music (Composition) at the Global Music Awards 2022.

== Selected Works: Discography ==
- First Symphony for orchestra (TROY 1378, Albany Records)
- From the Depth for soprano, chorus and orchestra (TROY 1378, Albany Records)
- Octet for strings (TROY 1378, Albany Records)
- Sunset in My Homeland for violin, clarinet, and piano (TROY 1378, Albany Records)
- Disintegration for piano and electronics (TROY 1378, Albany Records)
- Explosion for piano (TROY 1378, Albany Records)
- Two Poems by Ya Hsien for baritone and piano (TROY 1378, Albany Records)
- Breeze for flute (TROY 1378, Albany Records)
- The Maximum Speed of Raphael's Madonna for flute and piano (TROY 1378, Albany Records)
