= Bohdan Sehin =

Ukrainian composer

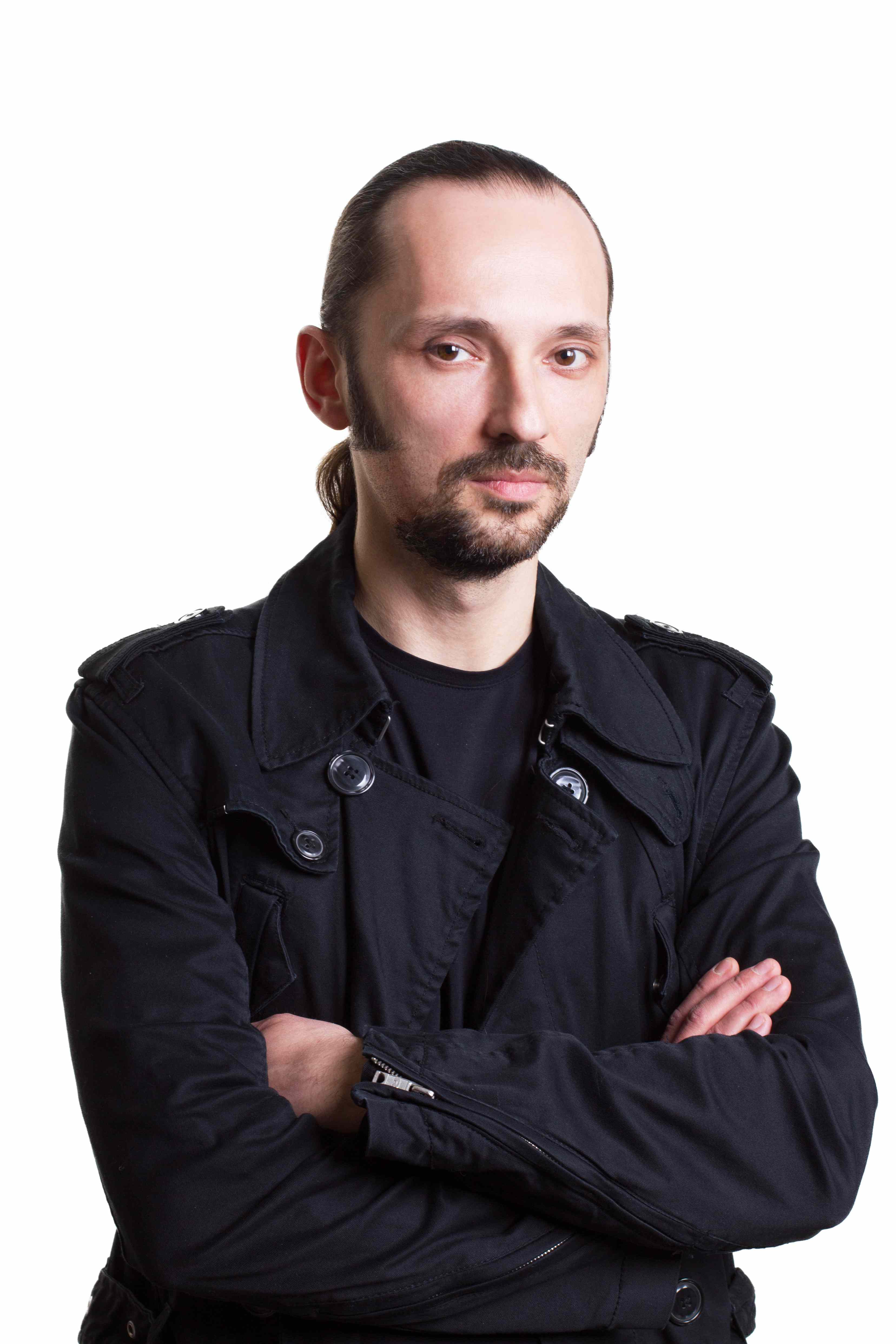
Bohdan Sehin

Bohdan Dariiovych Sehin (born 1976, in Borshchiv) is a Ukrainian composer.

== Early life and education ==
Sehin was born in 1976, in Borshchiv, Ternopil Oblast. In 1999, he graduated from the Lviv Conservatory, having studied with Myroslav Skoryk.

== Career ==
Sehin's music is often performed in Ukraine and abroad. He has been part of musical collaborations with the Polish Institute in Kyiv, the Goethe-Institut, and the Austrian Cultural Forum. In 2012, Sehin began working as commercial director for the development of contemporary music of the Lviv Regional Philharmonic and executive director of the Contrasts contemporary music festival. He is a member of the National Union of Composers of Ukraine.

=== As program organizer ===
- Contrasts, 1998 to 2006, Lviv
- Velvet Curtain, 2006, Lviv
- Kyiv Music Fest, 2009, Kyiv
- International Youth Music Forum 2009 and 2011–2012, Kyiv
- Ensemble Nostri Temporis, 2009–present
- Kyiv International Master Classes of New Music course, 2012–present
- Ukrainian Biennale of New Music, March 2013, Kyiv and Lviv

== Recognition ==
- Sergei Prokofiev International Composer Competition 2nd prize (2000)
- Friends of Warsaw Autumn Foundation scholarship (2003)
- StART All-Ukrainian Competition of Young Artists 2nd prize (2003)
- Gaude Polonia scholarships (2003, 2006)
- Levko Revutsky award (2004)
- Gulliver Connect grant (2008)
- Ukrainian Presidential Grant (2008–2010)
- All-Ukrainian Competition of Composers best choral work 1st prize (2011)

== See also ==
- Kontrasty
- Ensemble Nostri Temporis
- Academic Symphony Orchestra of the Lviv Philharmonic
