= Bohdan Kolomiichuk =

Ukrainian writer, screenwriter, and military medic (born 1984)

- Богдан Вікторович Коломійчук
- Kolomiichuk at a book presentation in Ivano-Frankivsk, November 2026
- Born: 19 February 1984 (age 42); Khmelnytskyi Oblast, Ukrainian SSR, Soviet Union
- Education: Lviv University
- Occupations: Writer, screenwriter, actor, combat medic
- Writing career
- Years active: 2013–present
- Genres: Detective fiction, historical fiction, adventure fiction, essay
- Notable works: Liudvysar. Ihry velmozh, Mozart iz Lemberga
- Notable awards: Koronatsiya Slova Grand Prix (2013); BookForum Best Book Award (2018)

Bohdan Viktorovych Kolomiichuk (Ukrainian: Богдан Вікторович Коломійчук; born 19 February 1984) is a Ukrainian writer, screenwriter, former stage actor, and combat medic. He is a member of PEN Ukraine. He writes historical adventure novels and retro-detective fiction, most notably a series about Lviv police commissioner Adam Vistovych set in the late 19th and early 20th centuries.

== Biography ==
Kolomiichuk was born on 19 February 1984 in Khmelnytskyi Oblast near Ostroh. He has Polish ancestry on his father's side and has spoken Polish since childhood. He graduated from a boarding lyceum in Slavuta. Later, he moved to Lviv and graduated from the Faculty of Physics at Lviv University in 2006. From 2002 to 2010, he worked as an actor and assistant director at the First Ukrainian Theatre for Children and Youth in Lviv.

Kolomiichuk published his debut novel, Liudvysar. Ihry velmozh (The Bellfounder: Games of Magnates), in 2013. The historical adventure novel is set in 16th-century Lviv and won the Grand Prix at the Koronatsiya Slova literary competition. In 2014, he published the short story collection Taiemnytsia Yevy (Eve's Secret), which introduced his recurring protagonist, Lviv police commissioner Adam Vistovych. Later books in the series include Viaznytsia dush (2015), Nebo nad Vidnem (2015), Vizyt doktora Froida (2016), Hotel "Velyka Prussiia" (2019), Ekspres do Galitsii (2020), 300 myl na skhid (2021), and Lvivskyi gambit (2026). Hotel "Velyka Prussiia" was shortlisted for the BBC News Ukrainian Book of the Year in 2019, and the Polish translation of Ekspres do Galitsii was nominated for the Angelus Award in 2022.

In 2017 and 2018, Kolomiichuk co-founded and curated the Carpathian Literary Residency. He conducted archival research in Salzburg with support from the LvivMozArt festival and wrote Mozart iz Lemberga (Mozart from Lemberg, 2018). This biographical novel focuses on composer Franz Xaver Wolfgang Mozart and won the BookForum Best Book Award.

On 22 February 2022, shortly before the Russian invasion of Ukraine, Kolomiichuk returned to Lviv from Dortmund and enlisted in the Armed Forces of Ukraine. He first served as a rifleman in the Territorial Defense Forces and later trained as a combat medic. In the summer of 2022, he participated in frontline medical evacuations in Donetsk, Kharkiv, and Luhansk Oblasts. In 2023, he was transferred to headquarters service and later joined the Ukrainian Ground Forces, reaching the rank of senior sergeant. During his military service, he contributed to the British anthology Writing Under Fire (2024) and published the essay collection Khoroshi peredchuttia (2026).

== Selected works ==
- Liudvysar. Ihry velmozh (2013)
- Taiemnytsia Yevy (2014)
- Viaznytsia dush (2015)
- Nebo nad Vidnem (2015)
- Vizyt doktora Froida (2016)
- Korol boliu (2017)
- Mozart iz Lemberga (2018)
- Hotel "Velyka Prussiia" (2019)
- Ekspres do Galitsii (2020)
- 300 myl na skhid (2021)
- Khoroshi peredchuttia (2026)
- Lvivskyi gambit (2026)
