= Ensemble Nostri Temporis =

Ukrainian classical music ensemble

Ensemble Nostri Temporis (ENT, Ensemble of Our Time) is a Ukrainian ensemble that specializes in performing contemporary classical music and promoting the work of contemporary composers, including Ukrainian. Ensemble Nostri Temporis also organizes art events in Ukraine dedicated to new music.

In 2007, then still sophomores Alexey Shmurak and Maksym Kolomiets of the Ukrainian National Tchaikovsky Academy of Music founded the Ensemble Nostri Temporis. According to Alexey Shmurak himself: "It is an ensemble that plays modern academic music and does various multimedia projects." Since 2010, the director of the ensemble is Lviv composer Bohdan Sehin.

== Recordings ==
In 2012, ENT released its first audio CD LIVE which includes works by five new-generation Ukrainian composers: Alexey Shmurak, Maxim Kolomiyets, Bohdan Sehin, Anna Arkushina, and Elena Serova. The CD was dedicated to the fifth anniversary of Ensemble Nostri Temporis.

In 2016, ENT recorded the audio CD Dialogues Without Borders which was released in Poland on Requiem Records. It includes five compositions: two works by Polish composers (Dariusz Przybylski and Jerzy Kornowicz) and three works by Ukrainian composers (Alexey Shmurak, Maxim Kolomiets and Bohdan Sehin).

== Creative activity ==
In 2010, they participated in the Darmstadt International Summer Courses for New Music.

In 2012, at the initiative of ENT, Ukraine regularly hosts "International Master Classes of New Music Course".

In 2014, ENT performed a program of music by contemporary Ukrainian and German composers in the program "ensembl[:E:]uropa" on West German radio station Westdeutscher Rundfunk.

In 2014, the large-scale Polish–Ukrainian project Neo Temporis Group, a large ensemble organized jointly by members of ENT and the Polish string quartet NeoQuartet, debuted with a concert at Warsaw Autumn. In 2015, this united international band had a series of concerts in Poland and Ukraine, and in 2016 made a major tour of Ukraine.

In 2018, within the framework of the project of the Republic of Poland "100 for 100. Musical decades of freedom" dedicated to the 100th anniversary of Poland's independence, performed works by five contemporary Polish composers in Lviv.

== Solo activities of the members ==
=== Alexey Shmurak ===
Alexey Shmurak together with Oleg Shpudeyko created the electroacoustic duo Bluk, where he practices live performances based on the theme of interdisciplinarity and new forms of interaction.

The duo has implemented a number of projects with artists, DJs, musicians, and poets. In 2015, he supervised a short series of electroacoustic improvisations in Kyiv. In 2016, he wrote the music for the video game "Bound" by Plastic and Sony Santa Monica Studios, and the choreography of "A Thread" by Jean Abreu Dance.

=== Maxim Kolomiets ===
As a performer, he participated in the festivals “Premieres of the Season” (Kyiv), International Forum “Music of the Young” (Kyiv), “Music Marine Fest” (Odesa), “Kyiv Music Fest” (Kyiv), International Forum “Women in Music” (Kyiv), “Fest der Innenhöfe” (Freiburg, Germany), master courses “Ensemble-Akademie” (Freiburg), Darmstadt International Summer Courses for New Music, Germany).

=== Bohdan Sehin ===
In 2019, the group's artistic director Bohdan Sehin was awarded the B. M. Lyatoshinsky prize for his vocal and instrumental work on spiritual themes Between East and West. The mystery of birth.
