= Kyiv Camerata =

Musical group in Kyiv

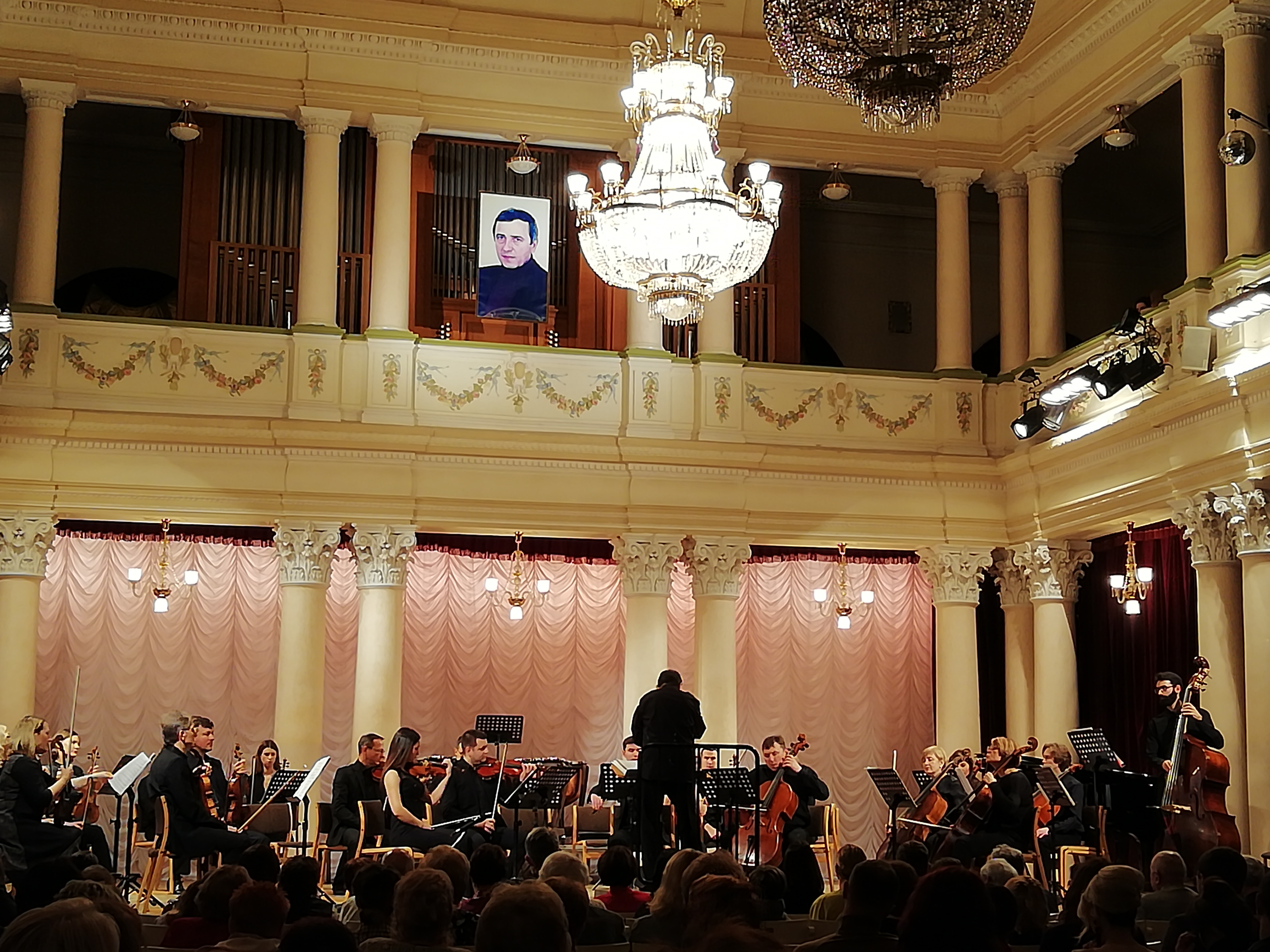
Kyiv Camerata, concert dedicated to the 75th anniversary of the National Philharmonic of Ukraine.

The Kyiv Camerata (in Ukrainian: Київська камерата, romanized: Kyivska Camerata) is a musical group in Kyiv, fully titled National Ensemble of soloists Kyivska Camerata. It is a leading Ukrainian performer of chamber music of different styles. The ensemble's repertoire is remarkably diverse, ranging from works of Vivaldi, Bach, Haydn, Mozart, Wagner, Grieg, Chaykovsky, Stravinsky, Sheinberg to the best samples of world avant-garde classics of the second half of the 20th century. Notably, the ensemble focuses on the popularization of modern Ukrainian music and the global representation of Ukrainian composers.

== History ==
The ensemble was founded by Valerii Matiukhin in 1977. Initially, Kyiv Camerata specialized in modern Ukrainian music; later its performances expanded to works of different epochs and genres. In 1993, Kyiv Camerata was granted the status of a state ensemble. In 2000, it became the national ensemble.

Over the years, the ensemble has performed a large number of premieres of contemporary Ukrainian composers: Valentyn Silvestrov, Volodymyr Zubytskyi, Ivan Karabyts, Yevhen Stankovych, Myroslav Skoryk, Oleh Kiva, Yurii Ishchenko, Ihor Shcherbakov, Hanna Havrylets, Karmella Tsepkolenko, I. Kyrylina, O. Levkovych, V. Hubarenko, V. Zahortsev, J. Vereshchahin, Zoltan Almashi, Oleksandr Shymko and others. The ensemble also collaborates with vocalists Nina Matviienko, Oleksandr Vasylenko, and Liudmyla Voinarovska.

In 2026 the ensemble recorded New Zealand composer Ross Harris's eighth symphony in a bomb shelter. Harris wrote the work in 2022 as a response to the Russian invasion of Ukraine.

The ensemble participates in academic music festivals in Ukraine. Furthermore, Kyiv Camerata have toured Germany, Austria, France, the US, China, Poland, Greece, Russia, the Baltics, Armenia, and Georgia. The ensemble has the status of the official orchestra of the All-Ukrainian Open Music Olympiad "Voice of the Country".

After Valerii Matiukhin's death in 2023 the ensemble was taken over by Bohdana Pivnenko, and from 2024 the principal conductor was Keri-Lynn Wilson.

== Bibliography ==
- «Київська камерата» // Ukrainian music encyclopedia. У 2 т. Т. 2. [Е – К] / гол. редкол. Г. Скрипник. — Київ : Видавництво Інституту мистецтвознавства, фольклористики та етнології НАН України, 2008. — С. 375–376.
