= Levko Revutsky award =

Ukrainian music award

Levko Revutsky award is an award to honor young composers and performers for the creation, stage and concert embodiment of outstanding musical works that have gained wide public recognition. It is named after the composer Levko Revutsky.

It was founded by resolutions of the Council of Ministers of the USSR № 290 (May 20, 1982) and № 356 (October 30, 1987).

== Recipients ==
Composers:

- 1989 – Viktor Stepurko
- 1990 – Yurii Lanuk
- 1995 – Victoria Poleva
- 1997 – Svyatoslav Lunyov
- 1998 – Vadym Zhuravitsky
- 1999 – Ivan Taranenko
- 2000 – Bohdana Frolyak
- 2001 – Alla Zahaikevych
- 2002 – Ivan Nebesnyy
- 2003 – Zoltan Almashi
- 2004 – Bohdan Sehin
- 2005 – Bohdan Kryvopust
- 2007 – Lyubava Sydorenko
- 2010 – Ostap Manulyak
- 2011 – Mykhailo Shved
- 2015 – Vitalii Vyshenskyi and Oleh Marynchenko
- 2016 – Vitalii Kyianytsia
- 2022 – Marichka Chaban
- 2023 – Renata Sokachyk
- 2024 – Yurii Pikush

Performers:

- 1993 – József Örmény (piano)
- 1998 – Evgeny Gromov (piano)
- 2000 – Yurii Kot and Iryna Aleksiychuk (piano duo)
- 2010 – Andrii Tuchapets (viola)
- 2011 – Bohdan Plish (conductor)
- 2014 – Dina Pysarenko (piano)
- 2015 – Marianna Skrypa (violin)
- 2016 – Kateryna Suprun (viola)
- 2017 – Andrii Pavlov (violin)
- 2018 – Nazarii Stets (double-bass)
- 2020 – Antonii Baryshevskyi (piano)
- 2022 – Orest Smovz (violin)
- 2023 – Nataliia Kozhushko-Maksymiv (flute)
- 2024 – Roman Fotuima (saxofon)

== Links ==
- Regulations, approval by Ministry of Culture of Ukraine
- Revutsky award, information by Ministry of Culture of Ukraine
