= Bogodar Kotorovych =

Ukrainian violinist, conductor, and music educator (1941–2009)

Bohodar Kotorovych PAUkrSSR
- Born: Bohodar Antonovych Kotorovych; July 3, 1941; Hrubieszów, Lublin Voivodeship, Poland
- Died: July 4, 2009 (aged 68) Kyiv, Ukraine
- Occupations: Violinist; Conductor; Music educator
- Education: Moscow Conservatory
- Notable work: Founder of the State Chamber Ensemble "Kyiv Soloists"
- Title: Professor at National Music Academy of Ukraine
- Awards: Shevchenko National Prize

Bohodar Antonovych Kotorovych (Ukrainian: Богодар Антонович Которович; 1941–2009) was a Soviet and Ukrainian violinist, conductor, and music educator. He was the founder of the State Chamber Ensemble "Kyiv Soloists" (now named after him), a professor at the Petro Tchaikovsky National Music Academy of Ukraine, and a key figure in establishing the modern Ukrainian violin school. He was a Corresponding Member of the National Academy of Arts of Ukraine (1997). For his creative contributions, Kotorovych was twice named a laureate of the prestigious all-Ukrainian "Person of the Year" award in 1999 and 2000. He was also honoured as a People's Artist of the Ukrainian SSR in 1979.

== Life and career ==
Kotorovych was born on July 3, 1941, in the small Polish town of Hrubieszów. In 1945, his family moved to Volhynia, and later to Lviv. In Lviv, he completed music school and, after one year of study at the Mykola Lysenko Lviv National Music Academy, was invited to the Moscow Conservatory to study under the renowned pedagogue Yuri Yankelevich. As a student, Kotorovych became a laureate of several prestigious international competitions, including the Paganini Competition in Genoa and the George Enescu International Competition in Bucharest. After graduating from the conservatory in 1966, he became the concertmaster of the State Symphony Orchestra of Ukraine and a soloist with the Kyiv State Philharmonic. From 1967, he taught at the Kyiv Conservatory, later serving as head of the violin department. Starting in 1994, he also taught at the Sydney Conservatorium of Music in Australia. In 1995, with the aim of fostering "high culture and elitism," he established the first Bohodar Kotorovych International Competition for Young Violinists in the United States. Among his students were Oleksandr Semchuk (Ukraine/Italy), Alina Komissarova (Denmark), Sviatoslava Semchuk, Bohdana Pivnenko (Ukraine), Yaroslav Rudnytsky (United States), Dmytro Tkachenko (United Kingdom), Oleksandr Pushkarenko, and members of the Kyiv-based Collegium Quartet, Taras Yaropud and Kyrylo Sharapov, as well as his daughter, Myroslava Kotorovych.

From 1995, Kotorovych led the State Chamber Ensemble "Kyiv Soloists," which he founded (now the National Chamber Ensemble "Kyiv Soloists" named after Bohodar Kotorovych). Over time, the ensemble gained international acclaim.

Kotorovych frequently served as a jury member for major international competitions, including the ARD International Music Competition in Munich, the Paganini Competition in Genoa, the Tchaikovsky Competition in Moscow, the Carl Nielsen International Competition in Odense, and the Benjamin Britten Competition in London, among others. He also consistently chaired the jury of the Mykola Lysenko International Music Competition in Kyiv and, from 2003, served as the artistic director of the Britten Kyiv Festival.

Kotorovych died on July 4, 2009, and was buried in Kyiv at the Baikove Cemetery.

== Awards and honors ==
- People's Artist of the Ukrainian SSR (1979)
- Order of Merit, Third Class (2001)
- State Prize of the Ukrainian SSR named after Taras Shevchenko (1985) – for concert programs from 1982 to 1984
- Volodymyr Vernadsky Prize (2000)

== Interesting facts ==
Bohodar Kotorovych was the only violinist in the world granted the honor of performing on the instrument of the great maestro Niccolò Paganini outside of Italy.
