= Viktor Chornyi =

Ukrainian politician

Viktor Chornyi Чорний Віктор Іванович
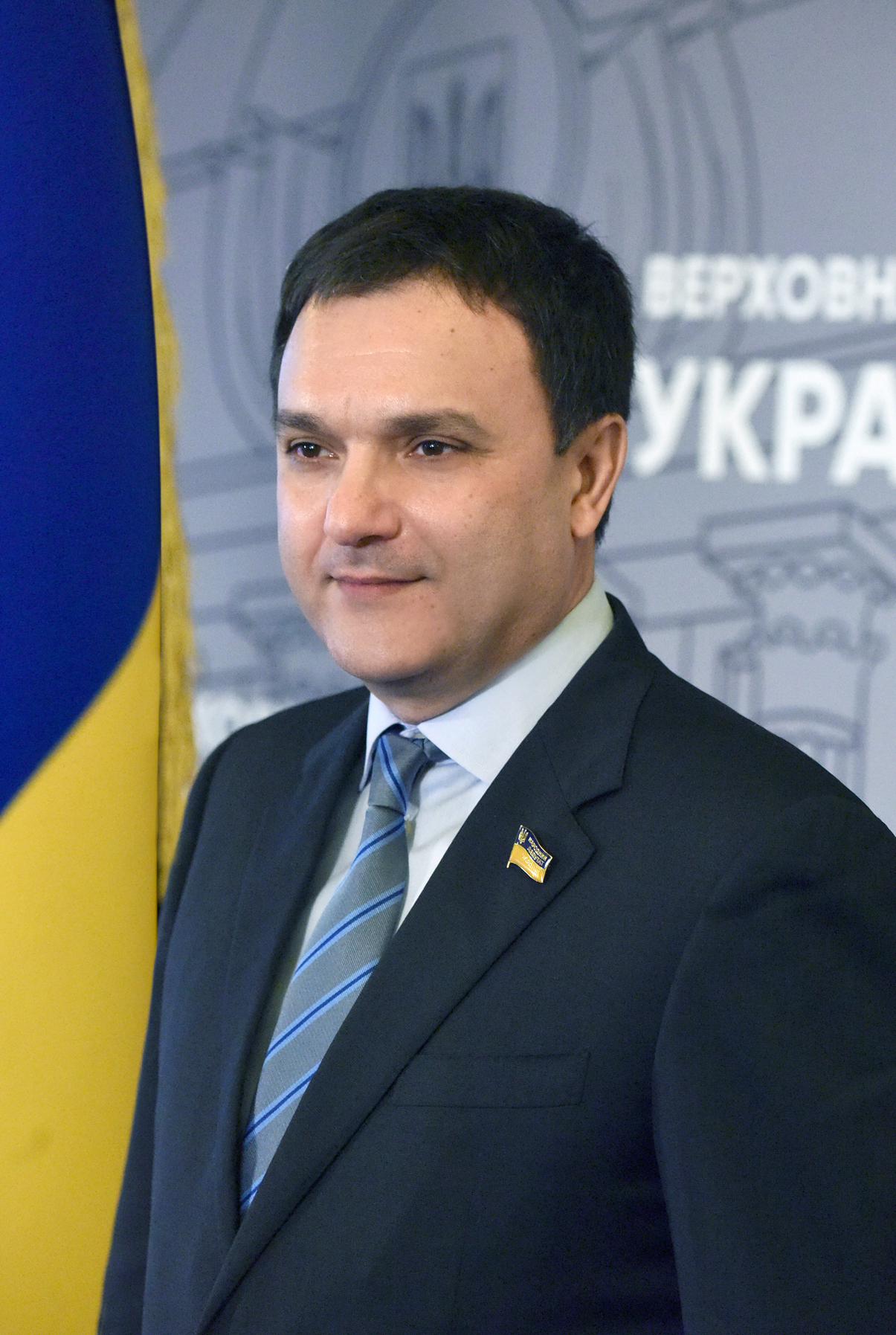

People's Deputy of Ukraine
- Incumbent
- Assumed office 29 August 2019

Personal details
- Born: Viktor Chornyi; 6 April 1968 (age 58) Yalta, Donetsk Oblast, Ukraine SSR
- Party: Opposition Platform — For Life

Viktor Ivanovych Chornyi (Ukrainian: Віктор Іванович Чорний; born 6 April 1968) is a Ukrainian politician and a statesman. He served as People's Deputy of Ukraine of the 9th convocation.

== Education ==
- From 1975 to June 27, 1985 — he studied at Yalta secondary school, which he finished with honour;
- From 1985 to July 8, 1989 he studied at Donetsk High Military-Political Collage of Engineer and Connection Troops. Specialty — military politician. Qualification — History and Social Science teacher;
- From September 1, 2000 to February 28, 2002 he studied at National Academy for Public Administration under the President of Ukraine. Specialty — state management. Qualification – Master of Science.

== Working activity ==
From 1989 – he is a military officer of USSR, Ukraine.

From 1996 to 1997 — a commercial director of Scientific Production Association «KLP-PLYUS »

From 1997 to 1998 — a director of confectionery “Grona”;

From 1998 to 1999 — a General Director of Limited Liability Company «Confectionary Trading House»;

From 2002 to 2005 — a Head of public organization «Consumer Protection Committee in Dantytskyi Region in Kyiv»;

From 2006 to 2010 — a deputy head of Podiliya Governor in Kyiv;

From 2011 to 2012 — the head of Ukrainian sanitary-Medical Center of State Organization «Ukrecoresursy»;

From 2015 to 2019 — a Director of Private limited company «Detective Security Company „Shtorm“».

== Public and political activity ==
- 1998 — a deputy of Kharkiv district administration in Kyiv; a deputy head of permanent committee.
- 2002—2006 - a deputy of Darnytsia district administration in Kyiv.
- 2009 — the Head of All-Ukraine public organization "Movement of Civil Activity"
- 2014 — Vice-President of Combat Sambo Federation of Ukraine
- Since 2019 – A People's Deputy of Ukraine of the IXth convocation,
- Faction: Member of the "Opposition Platform — For Life" political party parliamentary faction at the Verkhovna Rada of Ukraine. Post: Member of the Verkhovna Rada of Ukraine Committee on Anti-Corruption Policy, the Head of the Subcommittee of Public Affairs Cooperation.

== Rewards ==
The "Defender of the Motherland" Medal in 1999, Letters of Acknowledgement from Kyiv Mayor in 2000 and 2005, Certificate of Merit from Kyiv Mayor in 2007, The Candidate Master of Sports at judo.

== Family ==
Married, has two daughters and a son.
