= Bohdana Pivnenko =

Ukrainian violinist, producer, teacher (born 1977)

People's Artist Bohdana Pivnenko
- Богдана Півненко
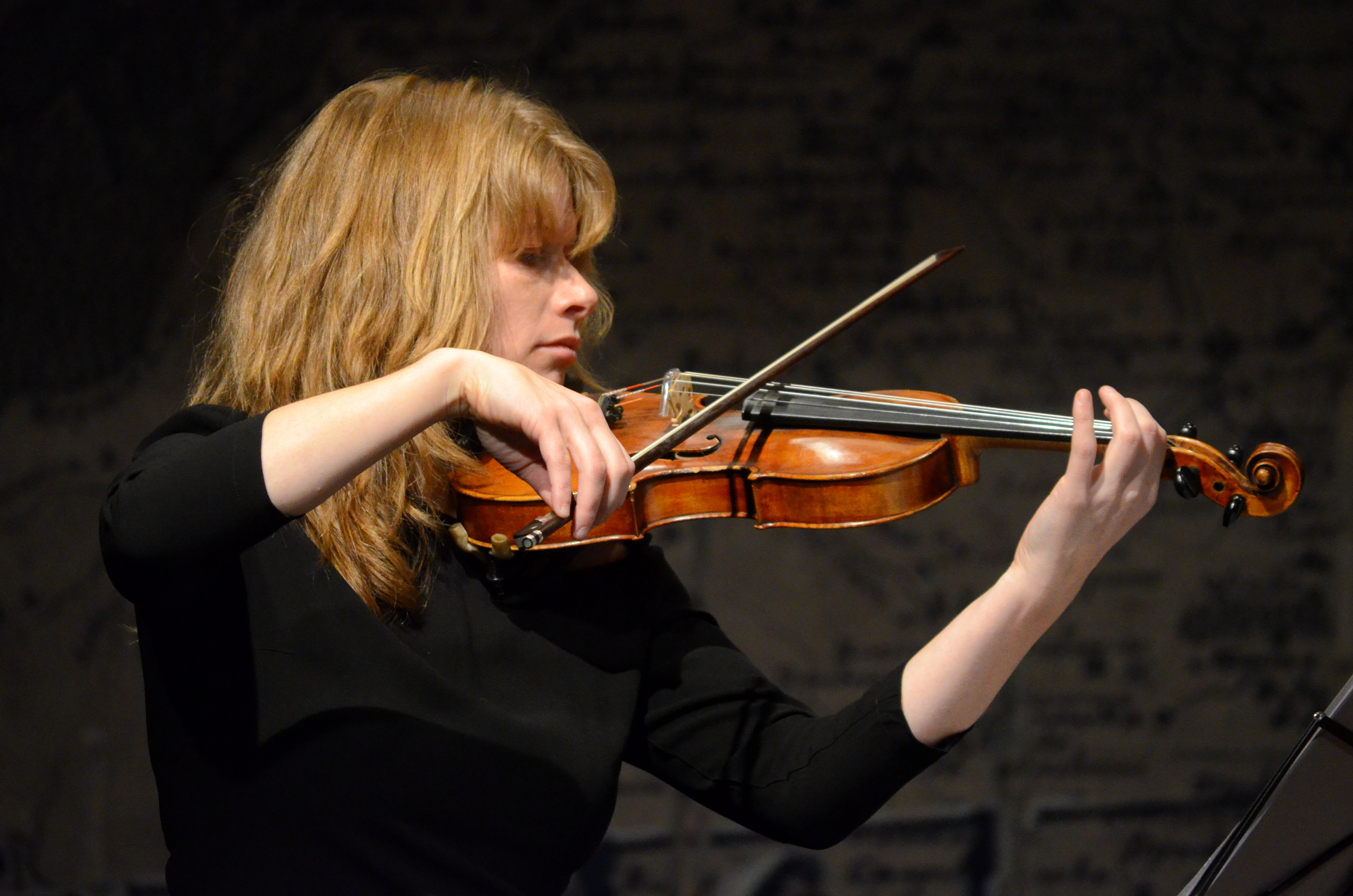
- Bohdana Pivnenko, 2015
- Born: 27 January 1977 (age 49); Kharkiv, Ukrainian SSR, Soviet Union
- Education: Kyiv Conservatory
- Occupations: Violinist, producer, teacher
- Awards: People's Artist of Ukraine; Merited Artist of Ukraine; Shevchenko National Prize

Bohdana Ivanivna Pivnenko or Bogdana Pivnenko (Ukrainian: Богдана Іванівна Півненко; born 27 January 1977) is a Ukrainian violinist, producer, teacher, professor. People's Artist of Ukraine, called the "Ukrainian Paganini in a skirt". Laureate of the Taras Shevchenko National Prize of Ukraine (2025). Soloist of the National Ensemble of Soloists "Kyiv Camerata".

== Biography ==
Born on 27 January 1977 in Kharkiv. Her father is an artist Ivan Marchuk; her mother is an art critic Alla Pivnenko, who taught at the Kharkiv Art and Industrial Institute.

In 1984, she began studying at the Kharkiv Music School, violin class. In 1993, she moved to the class of violinist Bogodar Kotorovych at the Mykola Lysenko Kyiv Secondary Specialized Music School. She also studied with Ihor Pyliatiuk, who worked as Kotorovych's assistant for some time.

In 1995–2003, she studied at the Kyiv Conservatory. In 2001–2003, she studied at the postgraduate course of the Kyiv Conservatory, in the class of Ihor Pyliatiuk and Bohodar Kotorovych.

From 2001, she played in the Philharmonia of Nations International Youth Orchestra under the direction of Justus Frantz.

2003 – master classes with prominent violinists Viktor Tretiakov, Zakhar Bron, and Pavlo Vernikov.

In 2000–2005, she was the concertmaster of the National Chamber Ensemble "Kyiv Soloists".

From 2008 to 2010, she took master classes with Olha Parkhomenko.

From 2000, she has been working with the National Soloists Ensemble "Kyiv Camerata". In July 2023, she was appointed acting general director and artistic director of the ensemble.

As a producer and performer, she participated in the creation of the 12-disc Anthology of Contemporary Ukrainian Music. The artwork of Ivan Marchuk was used in the design of the CDs.

From 1999 she has been a lecturer at the Kyiv Conservatory. In 2016–2023, she worked as the head of the violin department, and now she is a professor.

In 2014, she organized the project to support musically gifted children "My tvoi dity, Ukraino!" and is an active participant in the Responsible Future project.

She collaborated with Myroslav Skoryk, Valentyn Silvestrov, and Valerii Matiukhin.

She has performed concerts in England, Switzerland, France, Germany, Austria, the Netherlands, Georgia, Lithuania, Italy, Spain (including the Palau de la Música Catalana in Barcelona) and the United States (including Carnegie Hall in New York City). As a soloist, violinist Bohdana Pivnenko performs with the best orchestras of Ukraine. She has performed on the same stage with conductors including Juozas Domarkas, Volodymyr Sirenko, Saulius Sondeckis, Volodymyr Sheiko, Theodore Kuchar, Erki Pehk, Lutaras Balchenas, Natalia Ponomarchuk, and Oksana Lyniv.

== Filmography ==
- Ivan Marchuk, Valentyn Silvestrov. Beyond the horizon is the horizon... Virtual slide show. (DVD) – UKRmusic, 2012.
- Ivan Marchuk, Myroslav Skoryk. Beyond the horizon is the horizon... Virtual slide show. (DVD). – UKRmusic, 2013.

== Awards ==
- People's Artist of Ukraine (23 August 2018);
- Merited Artist of Ukraine (18 August 2006);
- Laureate of the Taras Shevchenko National Prize of Ukraine (5 March 2025);
- Laureate of the Mykola Lysenko International Music Competition in Kyiv (1997);
- Laureate of the International Competition of Interpreters and Instrumentalists (1997, Chișinău, Moldova);
- Laureate of the national program "New Names of Ukraine" (1997);
- Laureate of the International Youth & Music Festival Vienna (2000, Vienna, Austria);
- Laureate of the International Competition "IBLA Grand Prix" (2016, Italy);
- Laureate of the Tadini International Music Competition (2016, Lovere, Italy).

== Bibliography ==
- Півненко Богдана Іванівна // Ukrainian music encyclopedia. — Київ: Інститут мистецтвознавства, фольклористики та етнології імені М. Т. Рильського НАН України, 2018. — Том 5: ПАВАНА — «POLIКАРП». — С. 203-204
