= Mykhailo Stepanenko =

Ukrainian composer (1942–2019)

Mykhailo Stepanenko (June 6, 1942 - October 28, 2019, Kyiv) was a Ukrainian composer and musical and public figure, People's Artist of Ukraine, Honored Artist of the Russian Federation, professor, chairman of the Union of Composers of Ukraine in 1992–2005.

== Biography ==
Stepanenko was born in Semipalatinsk (Kazakhstan) on June 6, 1942. He graduated from the piano (1966) and composition (1971) faculties of the Kyiv Conservatory. Since 1967 - teaches at the Kyiv Conservatory, since 1973 - a member of the Union of Composers of Ukraine. From 1991 to 1993, co-chairman (together with T. Khrennikov) of the Union of Composers of the USSR. From 1992 to 2005, he headed the National Union of Composers of Ukraine (chairman of the board and First Secretary of the Union). Since 1997, he heads the piano nomination jury of Mykola Lysenko International Music Competition (1997).

Mykhailo Stepanenko was the author of symphonic, chamber-instrumental, choral works, romances, songs, music for theatrical performances. He has recorded more than 30 piano works by Ukrainian composers. Also he conducted a numerous researches in the field of the history of Ukrainian music, in particular, he restored and prepared for publication the violin and harpsichord sonatas by M. Berezovsky. As a pianist, he performed in Russia, the US, Canada, Japan, Finland, and Armenia, recorded several gramophone records and CDs. Member of the jury of many international competitions.
