= Kontrasty =

Music festival in Ukraine

Kontrasty (Ukrainian: Контрасти), or Contrasts, is an international festival of contemporary music held in Lviv, Ukraine, annually since 1995. The festival's concept is aimed at presenting "contemporary Ukrainian music in the context of World Music", and "revealing the diversity of modern forms, styles, genres, and interpretations." The festival usually takes place in September and October. Along with such festivals as "Two Days and Two Nights of New Music," "Kyiv Music Fest" and others, "Contrasts" is one of the leading festivals of modern classical music in Ukraine.

At the beginning of the festival's existence, its concept focused on avant-garde and experimental music (the model for the organizers was "Warsaw Autumn,") but over time the concept became less radical. In recent years, the experimental vector of the festival has been returning.

The founders of "Contrasts" are Polish conductor Roman Revakovich, composer Yuri Lanyuk, and musicologist Yarema Yakubyak. The art council also included Myroslav Skoryk (chairman) and Alexander Shchetynsky. The festival director is Vladimir Sivokhip.

The program of "Contrasts" includes works by contemporary composers, in particular premieres, as well as classics of the 20th century and past eras. Some concerts are based on the comparison of "old" music with "new," for example, works of the baroque or classicism era, and music by contemporary composers can be played within the same concert. Krzysztof Penderecki (1996 and 1999), Gia Kancheli (2014), Arvo Pärt (2001), Sofia Gubaidulina (2012), Sigmund Krause (2008), Saulius Sondeckis (2006), Leonid Grabovsky (2010), Bohuslav Schaeffer (2005), Elzbieta Sikora (2011) and others are among the famous participants of the festival.

== See also ==
- Chopin Music In The Open Air
- Kyiv Music Fest
- LvivMozArt
- Warsaw Autumn
- Bohdan Sehin
