= Premieres of the Season =

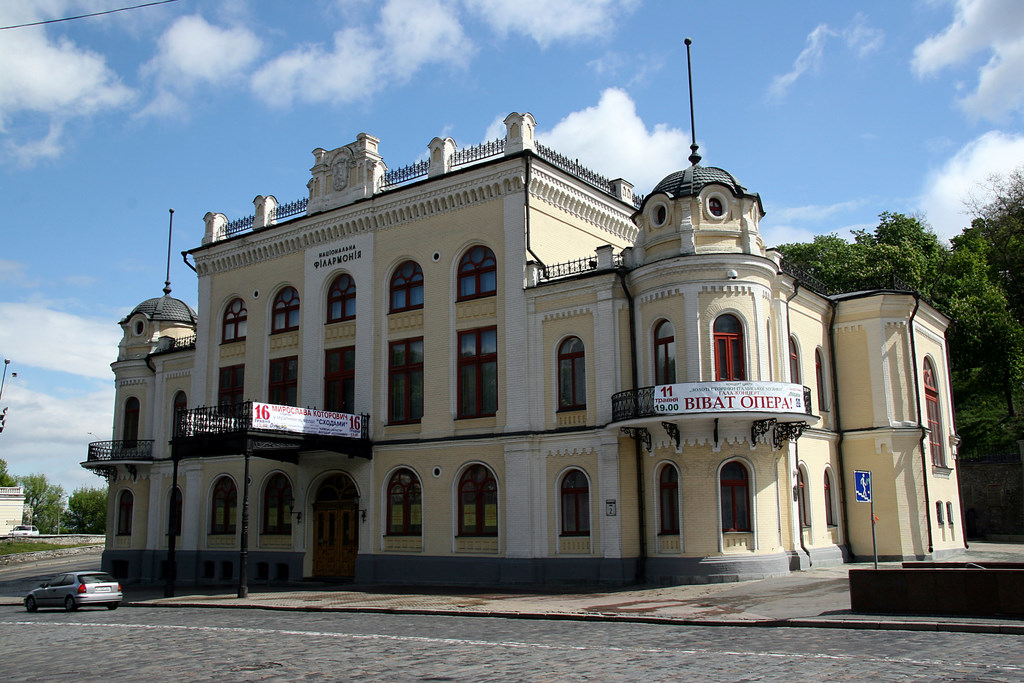
National Philharmonic in Kyiv, Ukraine.

Kyiv Music Premieres is an international music festival founded by the Ministry of Culture of Ukraine and the Kyiv Organization of the National Union of Composers of Ukraine on December 1, 1988. The initiator and music director of the festival is Ukrainian composer Ihor Shcherbakov. Since 1989, it has been held annually in Kyiv, Ukraine, in the Spring, from late March to early April. In 2015, it was held from May 24 – June 1.

== Concerts ==
The festival traditionally presents symphonic, chamber, choral, and opera music performed by the best Ukrainian and foreign ensembles and soloists who are widely known in the world. The festival is a member of one of the world's most famous associations of music and theater festivals—the International Society for Performing Arts (ISPA). The festival program consists mainly of premieres of works by Ukrainian composers, but international composers have also premiered there.

Concerts of the festival are held in the Column Hall of the National Philharmonic of Ukraine, the Large and the Small Hall of the NMAU, the House of Organ Music, the House of Scientists, and other halls.

Concerts start at 12:00, 4:00 and 7:00.

== Publications ==
The festival also includes scientific conferences, master classes of composers and performers, presentations of new printed publications, CDs, video and audio recordings of new works, and creative meetings with outstanding artists.

== 20th anniversary ==
On April 5–10, 2010, the 20th Anniversary International Festival of the Kyiv Organization of the National Union of Composers of Ukraine, "Musical Premieres of the 2010 season" was held in Kyiv.

== 25th anniversary ==
On May 24 — June 1, 2015, the 25th International Festival of the Kyiv Organization of the National Union of Composers of Ukraine "Musical Premieres of the 2015 season" was held in Kyiv.

The festival is dedicated to the holiday of the capital of Ukraine "Day of Kyiv."

== See also ==
- Chopin Music In The Open Air
- Kyiv Music Fest
- LvivMozArt
- Ihor Shcherbakov
- National Union of Composers of Ukraine
- Ministry of Culture (Ukraine)
- Ensemble Nostri Temporis
- Two Days and Two Nights of New Music
