= Ivan Nebesnyy =

Ukrainian composer

- Іван Небесний
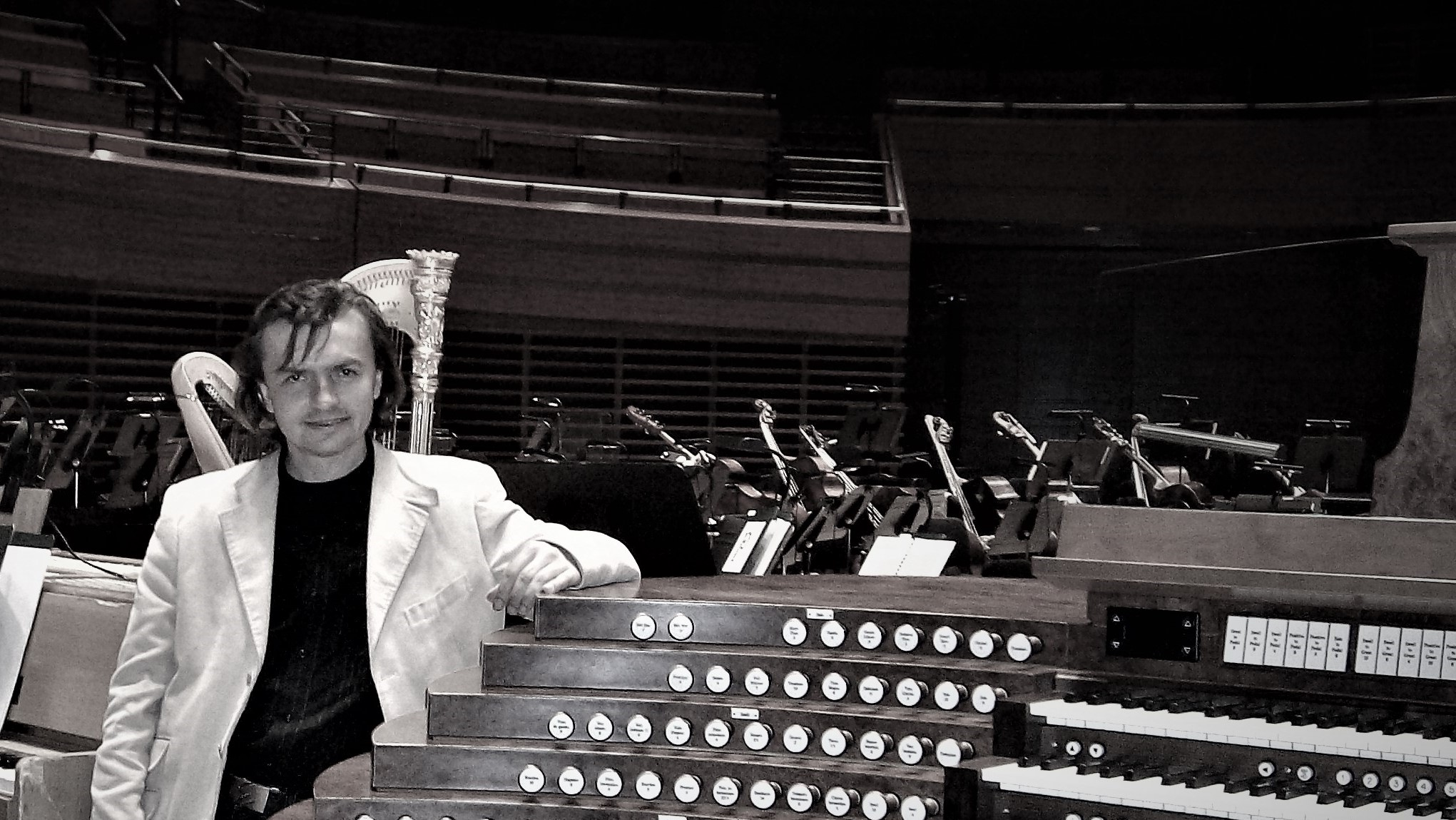
- Born: 15 July 1971 (age 54); Ternopil, Ukrainian SSR, Soviet Union
- Occupations: Composer; Music producer

Ivan Vasylovych Nebesnyy (Note: Ukrainian: Іван Васильович Небесний, romanized: Ivan Vasylovych Nebesnyi) (born July 15, 1971) is a Ukrainian composer and music producer.

Graduated from Lviv Conservatory in 1995 (composer class under Myroslav Skoryk). In 1996 Ivan Nebesnyy founded an ensemble "Cluster" which performed music by modern composers from Ukraine and abroad. In 2006 – 2011 Ivan Nebesnyy was a music director of the "Kyiv Music Fest".

== Selected works ==
Works by Ivan Nebesny are considered as postmodern. Among them:

- An opera, Fox Mykyta, based on the poem by Ivan Franko (premiered in Lviv opera in 2020);
- Heavenly Shchedryk, for carillon, mixed choir, children's choir, symphony orchestra and soundtrack with the sounds of Maidan Nezalezhnosti;
- What Zarathustra did not say about for violin, piano, percussion and tape;
- Music for Drama theatre, soundtracks and others.

== Honors ==
- Levko Revutsky award (2002),
- Mykhailo Verykivsky award (2011)),
- Kyiv Pectoral (2011),
- Boris Lyatoshinsky award (2020)

== Links ==
- Official page
- Gozik Julia (December 17, 2016). "Ivan Nebesny is a representative of the modern generation of Ukrainian composers" (in Ukrainian). Archived from the original on January 21, 2021.
