= Bernhard Wulff =

German composer (born 1948)

Bernhard Wulff (born 1948 in Hamburg) is a German composer, conductor, percussionist and musicologist.

Wulff studied conducting, composition and percussion in Hamburg, Freiburg, Basel and Siena and is professor for percussion instruments at the Hochschule für Musik Freiburg.

He is active as a conductor in Europe, South America, the US, Japan, Central Asia and the successor states of the Soviet Union, and as a visiting professor at various universities, including New York (Juilliard School and Manhattan School of Music), Tokyo, Buenos Aires, Santiago de Chile, Mexico City, Rochester, Montevideo, Odesa, San Juan, Ulaanbaatar, Hanoi.

As a composer, he wrote for various genres and was particularly interested in sound art installations and Biosignalverarbeitung. In 1989, he discovered and reconstructed the symphonic works of Viktor Ullmann. Lecture tours as a musicologist on the Ullmann theme took him to many countries.

Wulff is the founder and artistic director of several international music festivals: Two Days and Two Nights of New Music in Odesa (Ukraine), Roaring Hooves in Mongolia/Gobi Desert, "Silk Sound Road" in Kyrgyzstan, "Caspian Fires" in Azerbaijan and "Cracking Bamboo" in Vietnam.

For his services to Mongolian culture, he received an honorary doctorate from the University of Ulaanbaatar in 2010 and was appointed cultural ambassador of Mongolia by the Mongolian government.
