= Andriy Shtoharenko =

Soviet Ukrainian composer and teacher

Andriy Shtoharenko PAUSSR
- Андрій Якович Штогаренко
- Born: 15 October 1902; Novi Kaidaky
- Died: 15 November 1992 (aged 90)
- Education: Kharkiv Conservatory
- Occupations: Composer; Academic teacher
- Organizations: Kiev Conservatory; Union of Composers of Ukraine
- Awards: Hero of Socialist Labour, 1982; Shevchenko National Prize; Order of Lenin
- Website: stankovych.org.ua

Andriy Shtoharenko (Ukrainian: Андрій Якович Штогаренко) (15 October 1902 – 15 November 1992) was a Soviet Ukrainian composer and teacher.

== Biography ==
Andriy Shtoharenko was born in the Ukrainian village of Novi Kaidaky (now part of the city of Dnipro). He completed his music studies at the Kharkiv Conservatory in 1936 under S. Bohatyriov. From 1921-30 he worked a teacher of singing in Middle schools. In 1926 he became the director of an accordion ensemble.

In 1944 he became a member of the Communist Party of the Soviet Union. From 1954 he lectured at the Kiev Conservatory. In 1960 he became a professor and in 1968 became the rector of the above-mentioned institution. From 1968 he was the head of the Union of Composers of Ukraine.

As a composer, he was well known within the Soviet Union though his music is rarely performed elsewhere. He was awarded the Stalin Prize for his compositions in 1946 and 1952, and was awarded the prestigious title of People's Artist of the USSR. During his long career, he served in many positions, including Professor of Composition and Director of the Kharkiv Conservatory and later Kiev Conservatory.

Originally graduating as a button-accordion player and again as a composer. He composed in nearly every genre, primarily writing works for orchestra, solo piano, and voice. He also wrote number of film scores. His chamber music, though it comprises only a small part of his output, has been highly praised by critics. Shtoharenko's music shows the influence of Mussorgsky and Borodin in that many of his works tend to be of a programmatic and descriptive nature. Most of Shtoharenko's works deal with political themes glorifying the Communist party. A large section also deal with themes such as World War II and Friendship of Soviet Peoples.

== Important works ==
- Lenin walks across this planet (1967)
- Cantata to the 800th anniversary of Moscow (1954)
- The Road to October (1977)
- Ode to the Communist Party (1977),
- 6 symphonies
- Symphonic Dances (1980)

== Awards ==
- Stalin Prize (1946, 1952)
- People's Artist of the USSR (1972)
- Hero of Socialist Labour (1982)
- Shevchenko National Prize (1974)
- Order of Lenin (1960, 1982)
