= Yalta, Donetsk Oblast =

Urban locality in Donetsk Oblast, Ukraine

Yalta Ялта
- Rural settlement
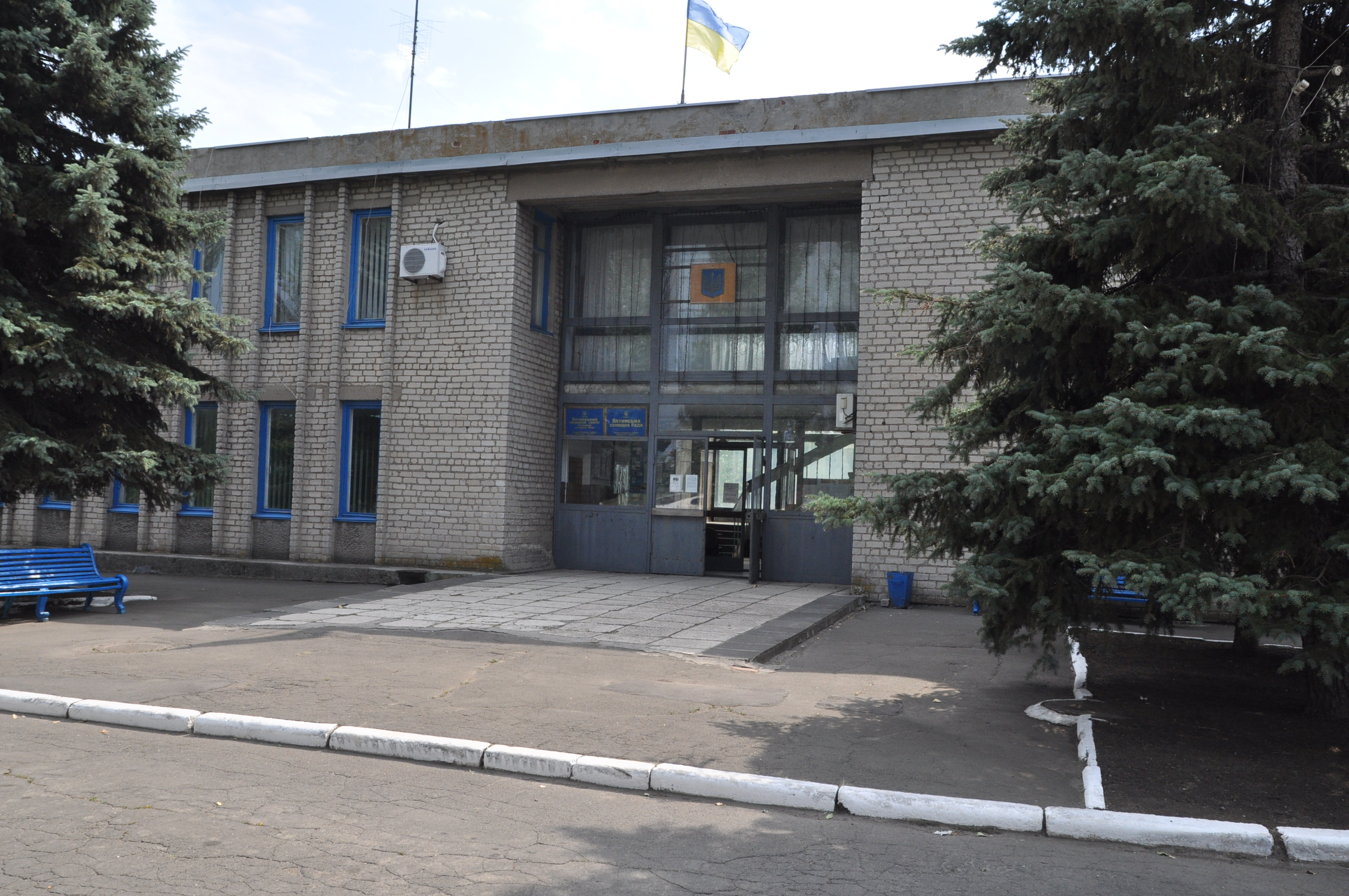

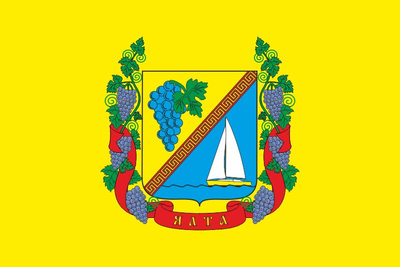
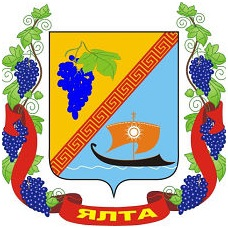
- Flag Coat of arms

- Location of Yalta in Donetsk Oblast Yalta (Donetsk Oblast)
- Coordinates: 46°57′45″N 37°16′19″E
- Country: Ukraine
- Oblast: Donetsk Oblast
- Raion: Mariupol Raion
- Hromada: Manhush settlement hromada
- Founded: 1780

Area
  - Total: 12.86 km^{2} (4.97 sq mi)
- Elevation: 40 m (130 ft)

Population (2022)
  - Total: 4,700
  - Density: 370/km^{2} (950/sq mi)
- Time zone: UTC+2
  - Summer (DST): UTC+3
- Postal code: 87450, 87451
- Area code: +380 6297

Yalta (Ukrainian: Ялта) is a rural settlement in Mariupol Raion, Donetsk Oblast, eastern Ukraine. It was founded by Crimean Greeks, whose deportation to Southern Ukraine was carried out on the order of Empress Catherine the Great, and is named after Yalta in Crimea. Population: 4,700 (2022 estimate).

During the Russian invasion of Ukraine in 2022, as part of the Russo-Ukrainian War, Yalta was invaded and occupied by Russian forces.

== Notable people ==
- Viktor Chornyi (born 1968), Ukrainian politician
- Ivan Karabyts (1945–2002), Ukrainian composer and conductor
