= Viktor Stepurko =

Ukrainian composer

Viktor Stepurko (born December 22, 1951) is a Ukrainian composer.

In 1975–1981 Stepurko studied in Kyiv Conservatory. Since 1983 he lives in Makariv, where he teaches in musical school and leads ensemble. Since 2004 he teaches in National Academy of Government Managerial Staff of Culture and Arts.

== Selected works ==
Music

- Symphonic poem "Islands of Childhood";
- Opera "The Music store";
- Three choirs on a lyrics by I. Drach
- Choirs on lyrics by Taras Shevchenko: "Flowing Water" (1984), "Over the Dnieper Saga" (1986), Cycle "My Dawn", "Dawn, the edge of the sky burns", "False fear is bad", "Oh oak, dark grove";
- Spiritual choirs "Prayer litany", "I believe", "Hear me, Lord", "Psalms of David" (2010), Liturgy of St. John Chrysostom (2011), "Kyiv frescoes" (2016), Confessional liturgy;
- "Confessional Liturgy" of the bright memory of Hetman Ivan Mazepa. For reader, symphony orchestra and organ (2004).

Scientific

- The manifestations of artistic introversion in the works of composers of Ukraine in the second half of the XX – beginning of the XXI century (2017), dissertation of the candidate of art history.

== Honors ==
- Levko Revutsky award, 1989
- Ivan Ogienko award, 1998
- Boris Lyatoshinsky award, 2002
- Mykola Lysenko award, 2005
- Shevchenko National Prize, 2012
