= Ivan Karabyts =

Ukrainian composer and conductor

People's Artist Ivan Karabyts
- Іван Карабиць
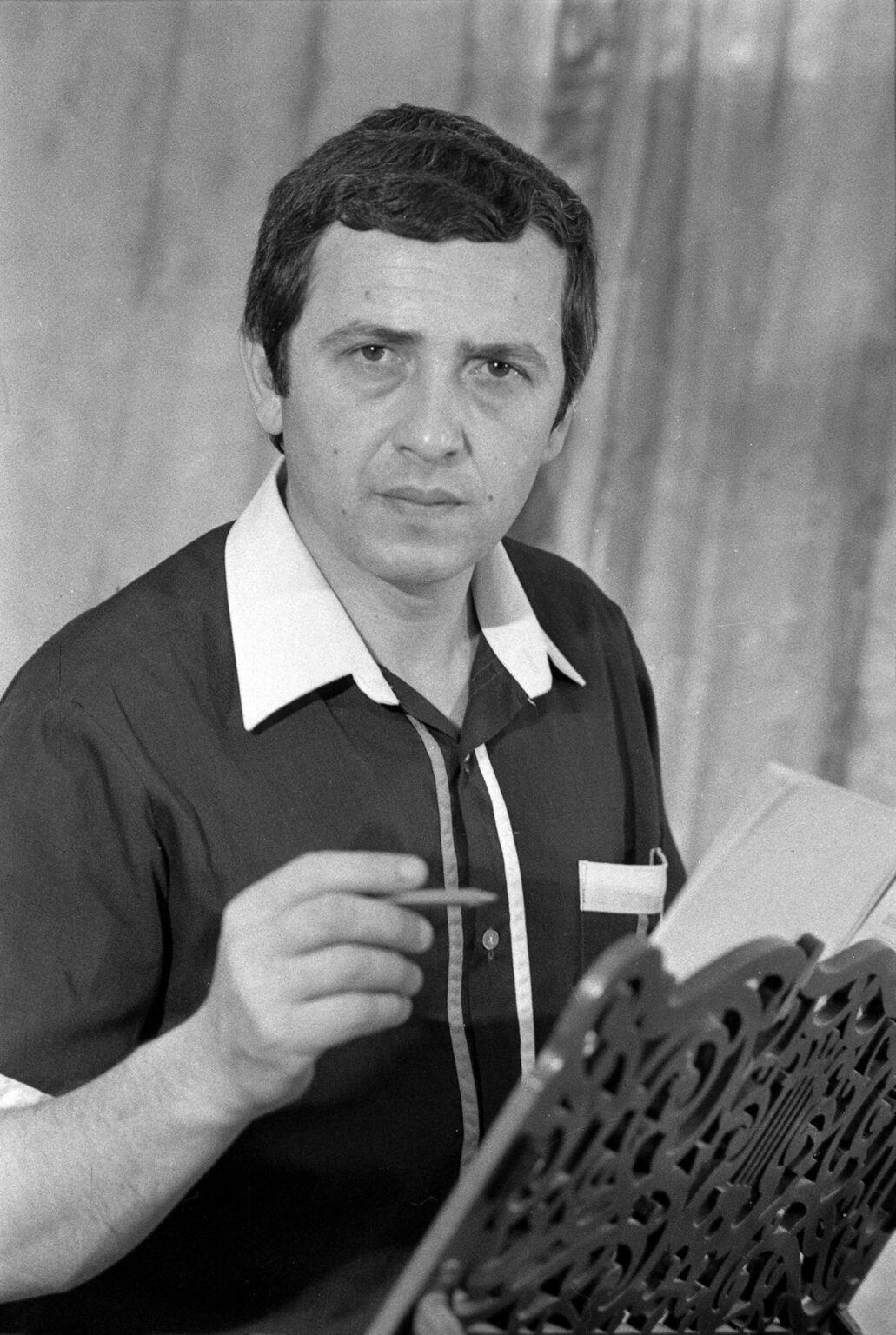
- Karabyts photographed by Yu. Mosenzhnyk, June 1986
- Born: 17 January 1945; Yalta, Ukrainian SSR, Soviet Union (now Ukraine)
- Died: 20 January 2002 (aged 57); Kyiv, Ukraine
- Resting place: Baikove Cemetery, Kyi
- Education: Kyiv Conservatory
- Era: 20th century
- Children: Kirill

Ivan Fedorovych Karabyts (Ukrainian: Іван Федорович Карабиць; 17 January 1945 – 20 January 2002) was a Ukrainian composer and conductor, and a People's Artist of Ukraine.

He was born in the village of Yalta, Donetsk Oblast in eastern Ukraine, and graduated from the Kyiv Conservatory in 1971, where he studied under Borys Lyatoshynsky and Myroslav Skoryk. Karabyts conducted the Dance Ensemble of the Kyiv Military District and the Kyiv Camerata. He also taught at the Kyiv Conservatory.

Ivan Karabyts wrote works for solo piano, orchestra, voice, piano, and voice, as well as different combinations of instruments. His works have been performed throughout the nations of the former Soviet Union, many European nations, and the United States. He died in Kyiv, aged 57.

His son is the conductor Kirill Karabits.

== Style ==
Dysko-Round-dance
Performed by А. Diomin (clarinet), Andriy Bodarenko (piano)

Prelude No. 1 for piano

Prelude No. 8 for piano

Prelude No. 10 for piano

Prelude No. 17 for piano
performed by Andriy Bondarenko

L. Kyyanovska maintained that all of the composers who influenced Karabyts' music were united by passion and a willingness to confront the officially accepted canons of art. Nevertheless, Karabyts' teacher Borys Lyatoshynsky had a noticeable influence on his music, as well as a group of like-minded students including V. Silvestrov, L. Grabovsky, V. Godziatsky, V. Guba, E. Stankovych, and O. Kiva. O. Beregova considered that Karabyts' work showed the breadth and universality of creative thinking and an innovative approach to traditional musical genres and forms.

Early works by Karabyts are distinguished by the expressiveness of musical language and the search for individual style and the composer's liberal use of dodecaphony. Most of the early works were chamber works, some of them in neofolk style, including "Three songs on folk texts" for voice and piano (1969), "Songs by Yavdokha Zuikha" for voice, flute and viola, and "Music" for solo violin (1974).

In the 1970s and 1980s, Karabyts was attracted to large-scale musical productions. Symphonic and vocal-symphonic genres predominate (such as the oratorio "Kyiv Frescoes" and three concerts for orchestra), as well as philosophical and civic themes (including themes of the Motherland, memory, moral duty).

Karabyts' vocal-symphonic works tend to conceptual concreteness, entertainment, achieved by dramaturgical functions of the narrator, independent and rather active role of the poetic component, program accuracy of musical expression, genre associativity, timbre dramaturgy, etc.

The universality of the musical language of the works of his next period was determined by the synthesis of various elements of modern compositional techniques (such as pointillism, aleatorics, sonoristics) in combination with new tonal and new modal pitch organization, intersection of different stylistic tendencies (neoclassicism, neo-baroque, neo-impressionism, jazz). In the figurative sphere, the tragic is intensified and the theme of repentance is actualized (Concerto 3 "Lamentation", Concert-triptych for orchestra), the pantheistic theme sounded in a new way («Music from Waterside»).

In a letter to Virko Baley, Ivan Karabits described his own style as follows:

In Soviet times, we received a basic education, but we were not sufficiently informed about what was going on in the multifaceted music world.... My music [is] characterized by a desire to synthesize different musical sources...Mahler, Lyatoshynsky, Stravinsky, Shostakovich, [are some who] influence my music.... I consider the most important of my works [to be]: Concerto for choir and orchestra “Garden of Divine Songs”; Symphony "5 songs about Ukraine", 2nd concert for orchestra, 3rd concert for orchestra; Symphony for strings

== Selected works ==
=== For orchestra ===
- Symphonies: No. 1 "5 songs about Ukraine" (1974), No. 2 (1977)
- Concerts for orchestra: No. 1 (1981), No. 2 (1986), No. 3 (1989)
- "Dedicated to October" (symphonic prelude, 1977)
- Triumphal Overture (1980)
- ballet "Heroic Symphony" (1982)

=== For choir (voice) and symphony orchestra ===
- "Garden of Divine Songs" on the poem by Hryhoriy Skovoroda for choir, soloists and symphony orchestra (1971)
- "Vivere memento" ("Remember to live") on the poem by Ivan Franko for bass and symphony orchestra (1970)
- "My native Donbass" (1980)
- "Kiev frescoes" opera-oratorio on verse by Borys Oliynyk for soloists, choir and symphony orchestra
- "Prayer of Catherine" on the poem by Catherine Motrych for chtitsa, children's choir and symphony orchestra (1993)
- "Jubilee cantata" on the poem Mykola Rudenko for soloists, choir and symphony orchestra

=== For instruments solo and symphony orchestra ===
- Piano concertos with orchestra: No. 1 (1968), No. 2 (1971), No. 3 "Lamentation" (1989)
- 5 musical moments for piano and orchestra (1999)
- Cello concerto with orchestra (1968)

=== For jazz band ===
- Quintet (1966)
- Ukrainian souvenir (1980)
- "Festive Kyiv" (1980)
- "Symphony of Labor" (1981)

=== For chamber orchestra ===
- Symphony for Strings (1967)
- Symphony No.3 for strings
- Concertino for chamber orchestra (1970)
- Triptych for Strings (1996)
- Vio-serenade (2000) for string orchestra

=== For voice and instruments ===
- "Three Ukrainian songs" for choir and piano (1969)
- "Pastels" vocal cycle on the words Pavlo Tychyna for soprano and piano (1970)
- "From the Songs of Hiroshima" cycle on poems by E. Yoneda for soprano and flute
- "Stories" vocal cycle on the texts of A. Kulich for baritone and piano (1975)
- "From the lyrics of M. Rylsky" a series of songs for mezzo-soprano and piano (1976)
- "On the shore of eternity" cycle of songs based on poems by B. Oliynyk
- "Mother" cycle on poems by B. Oliynyk for voice and piano

=== For solo instruments ===
- Sonata for piano (1967)
- "Music" for solo violin (1972)
- 24 preludes for piano (1976)
- "Waltz" for viola solo (1982)

=== Chamber works ===
- Sonatas for cello and piano: No. 1 (1968), No. 2 (1972)
- "Lyrical Scenes" for violin and piano (1970)
- Сoncert suite for violins (1973)
- String Quartet (1973)
- Concert divertissement for 6 performers (1975)
- Impromptu for Viola and piano (1976)
- "Disco round dance" for clarinet and piano (1981)
- Concertino for 9 performers (1983)
- "What the river sings" for 7 performers (1993)
- "Introduction and Collision" for 2 violins and flute (1993)
- "Music from waterside" for flute, clarinet, violin, piano and drums (1994)

=== Music for cinema ===
Cinema

- "Thirteen Poplar Street" (1969)
- "Commissioners" (1970)
- "Discover yourself" (1972)
- "Earthly and heavenly adventures" (1974)
- "Island of Youth" (1976)
- "Sergeant Onion's Country Trip" (1979)
- "Life of the Holy Sisters" (1982)
- "No year week" (1982, t / f)
- "Heat of the cold earth" (1984)
- "Ivanko and Tsar Poganin" (1984)
- "Wonders in Garbuzyana" (1985)
- "Wounded Stones" (1987)
- "The Way to Hell" (1988)
- "From the life of Ostap Vyshnya" (1991)
- "Score on the tombstone" (1995)
- "In the field of blood. Aceldama"(2001) and others.

Cartoons

- "Toothpick" (1972)
- "The elephant had a dream" (1973)
- "The Boy with the Bridle" (1974)
- "The Rooster and the Sun" (1974)
- "Thread and Kitten" (1974)
- "Dad, Mom and the Goldfish" (1976)
- "Who is the master in the forest?" (1977)
- "Cain's Tears" (1980)
- "Winged Master" (1981)
- "Rain, rain, let it go!" (1982)
- "Crane" (1982)
- "As the first letter was written" (1984)
- «Жили-пили» (1985)
- "Colorful History" (1986)
- "Christmas Tale" (1993)
