= József Örmény =

Ukrainian pianist of Hungarian origin (born 1960)

József Örmény Йожеф Ермінь
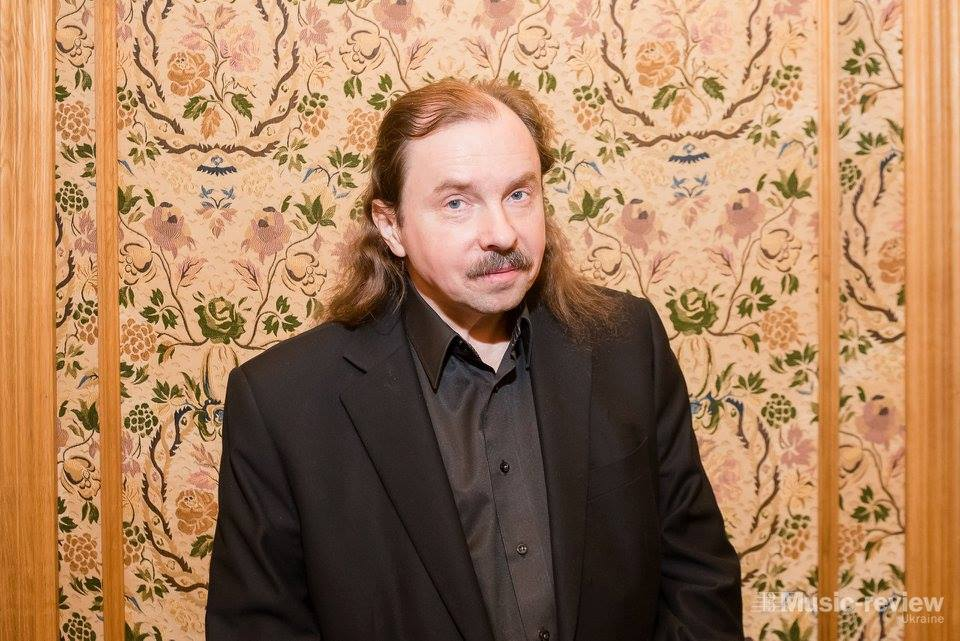

Background information
- Born: 1960 (age 65–66); Uzhhorod, Ukrainian SSR, Soviet Union
- Genres: Classical
- Occupations: Pianist; Teacher
- Instrument: Singing

József Örmény (Note: Hungarian: Örmény József; Ukrainian: Йожеф Франтишкович Ермінь, romanized: Yozhef Frantyshkovych Ermin) (born 1960) is a Ukrainian pianist of Hungarian origin. He is mostly known for performing 20th-century music including Olivier Messiaen, Karlheinz Stockhausen, Alfred Schnittke and Ukrainian composers Yevhen Stankovych, Valentin Silvestrov, and others. He was born in Uzhhorod, Ukraine, and he was also in close creative relationship with the Polish composer Andrzej Nikodemowicz, who wrote five of his piano concerti for Örmény.

== Early life ==
József Örmény was educated at the Lviv Conservatory, where he studied with Maria Krushelnytska and afterwards at Moscow Conservatory, where he studied with Yevgeny Malinin.

== Career ==
Today, he is a professor in Lviv Conservatory and an active piano performer.
