= National Organ and Chamber Music Hall of Ukraine =

- Національний будинок органної та камерної музики України
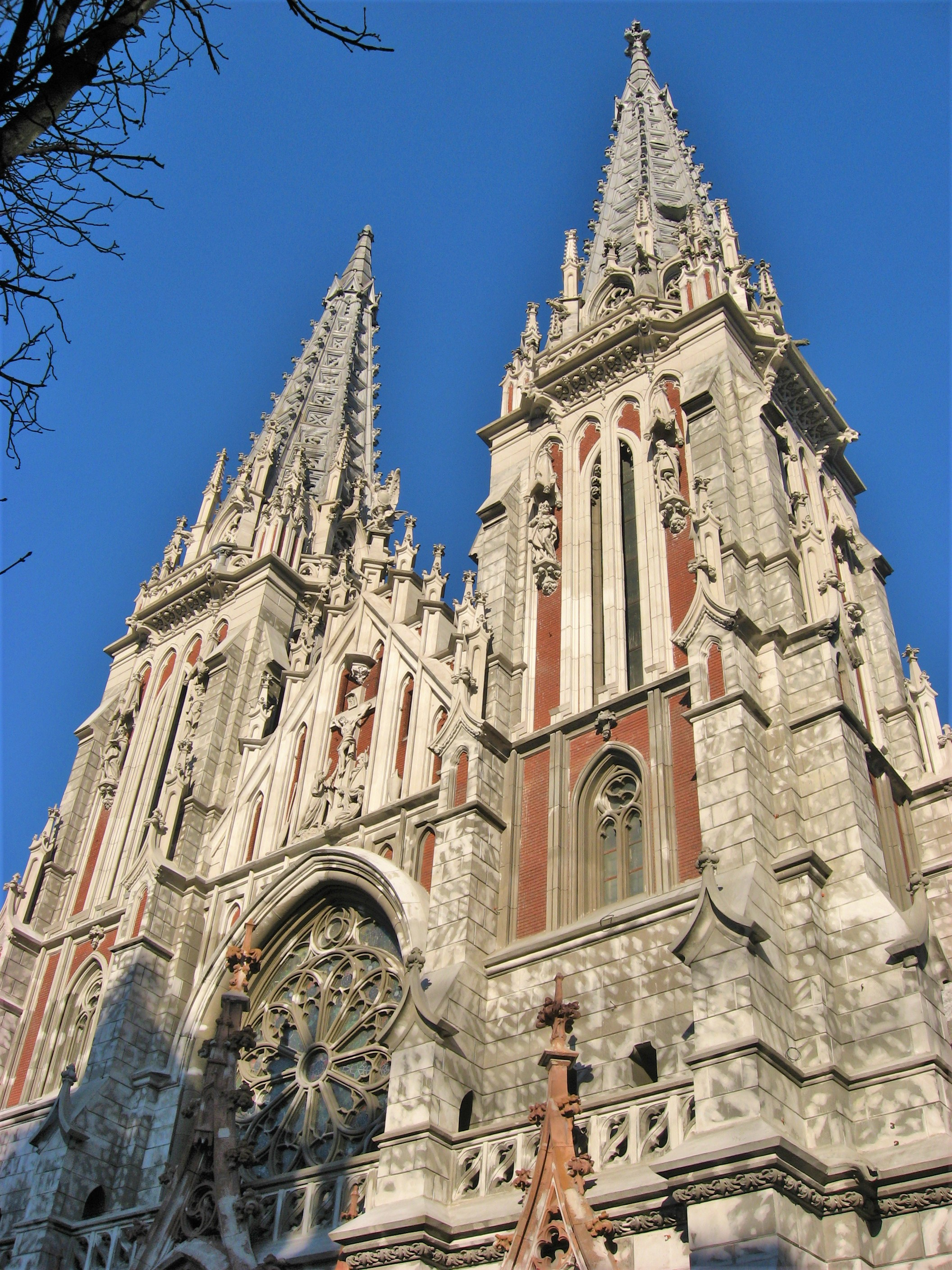
- View of the church
- Interactive map of the National Organ and Chamber Music Hall of Ukraine area

General information
- Location: 77 Velyka Vasylkivska Street, Kyiv, Ukraine
- Coordinates: 50.4269°N 30.5176°E
- Construction started: 1980

Design and construction
- Architect: Б. Городетски

Website
- Official website

The National Organ and Chamber Music Hall of Ukraine (Ukrainian: Національний будинок органної та камерної музики України, romanized: Natsionalnyi budynok orhannoi ta kamernoi muzyky Ukrainy) is a cultural institution in Kyiv, Ukraine. It is located at the St. Nicholas Cathedral which it shares with the Catholic Church of Ukraine. A hall of the church was rebuilt as a concert hall in February 1980.

== Building ==
The St. Nicholas Cathedral was completed c. 1909 to accommodate the growing Polish community in Kyiv. It was closed by the Communists after 1917, used for storage in the 1930s and later as an archive. The building suffered heavy damage during the Second World War.

In the late 1970s, the Council of Ministers of the Ukrainian SSR decided to restore the building as the National Organ and Chamber Music Hall for the Ukrainian Ministry of Culture. The work was overseen by architects O. Grauzhis and I. Tukalevskiy, with stained-glass windows from the Baltics, upholstered furniture from Lviv, and parquet flooring from Kivertsi.

Since 1992, the building has been shared with the Catholic Church in Ukraine. The Ministry of Culture plans to construct a new building for the Organ and Chamber Music Hall by 2023.

== Organs ==
The main organ was designed and built for the concert hall by Rieger–Kloss in 1979. The body has 55 registers; divided into three manual and pedal keyboards, with 3,846 wooden and metal pipes sized from 13 millimetres (0.51 in) in diameter to 6 metres (20 ft) in length. The organ has a wide timbre palette, allowing performance of works of different styles and directions.

A rehearsal organ, also crafted by Rieger–Kloss in 1979, has 56 keys in two manuals and a 30-key pedal. Its 8 registers have a wide distribution, allowing some imitation in preparation for performance with the large organ.

== Creative teams ==
The creative team of the National Organ and Chamber Music Hall include the Borys Lyatoshynsky ensemble, "Ravisan" trio, Mykola Lysenko quartet, the Kyiv and Kyiv Brass chamber ensembles, organists, soloist-instrumentalists, and singers.

Artistic directors of the institution include:

- Prof. Arseniy Mykolayovych Kotlyarevsky (1981–1986)
- Alexander Kostin (1987–1997)

== Notable performers ==
- Koshuba Volodymyr Viktorovych (organist) – People's Artist of Ukraine
- Kalinovska Iryna Mykolayivna (organist) – People's Artist of Ukraine
- Balakhovska Valeria Valeriyivna (organist) – Honored Artist of Ukraine
- Kharechko Iryna Ivanivna (organist) – Honored Artist of Ukraine
- Sidorenko Maksym Ivanovych (organist) – Honored Artist of Ukraine
- Bubnova Anna (organist) – Honored Artist of Ukraine
- Pivnov Vitaliy Mykolayovych (organist)
