= Two Days and Two Nights of New Music =

Music festival in Ukraine

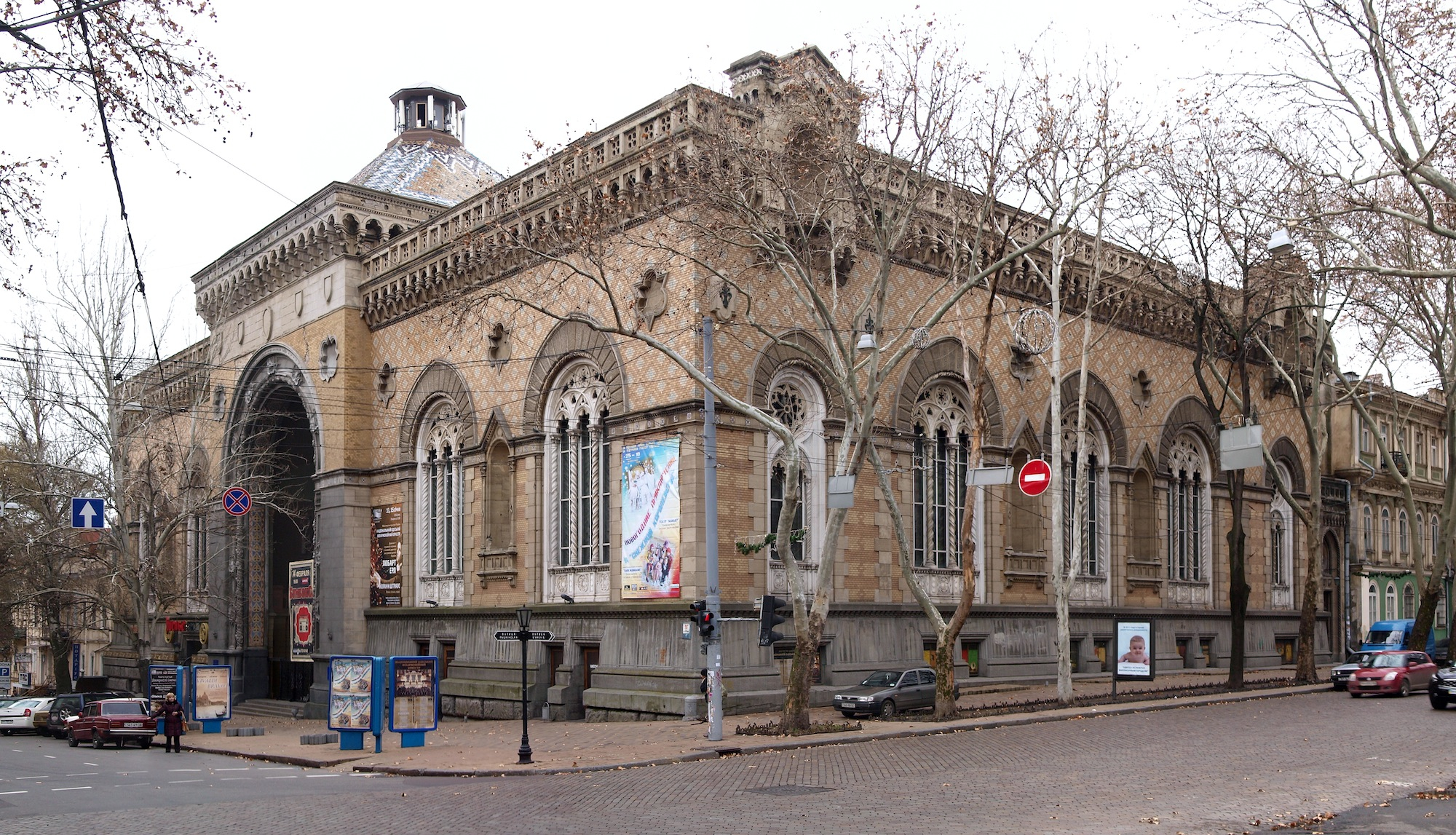
- The Odesa Philharmonic Theater, the festival's main venue
- Genre: Experimental
- Dates: mid-April
- Locations: Odesa, Ukraine
- Years active: 1995–present
- Organizer: Association for New Music
- Website: 2D2N

Two Days and Two Nights of New Music (Ukrainian: Два дні й дві ночі нової музики) or 2D2N (Ukrainian: 2Д2Н) is an annual 48-hour music festival held in Odesa, Ukraine. The festival features new music from both Ukrainian and international artists, mostly in the experimental music genre. Founded by Karmella Tsepkolenko in 1995, it is organized by the Association for New Music, the Ukrainian section of the International Society for Contemporary Music. The current president of the festival is German composer and conductor Bernhard Wulff. Having grown steadily since its inception, 2D2N is considered one of the largest music festivals in Ukraine. It is funded through government support, private donors, and various of international government agencies and projects, including those of Israel, Sweden, and Switzerland. The festival primarily features works of classical avant-garde and postmodernism created in recent years, representing various trends in both live and electronic, computer and acoustic music. On the other hand, the festival does not shy away from new or unusual art forms for Ukrainian audiences, such as traditional art from Armenia, Korea, Mongolia, or Alaska. In general, the festival aims to develop new forms of communication between musicians, between musicians and the public, to theatricalize musical art along with all other arts, and to synthesize different types of art. The festival promotes international cooperation in such a way that the works of Ukrainian composers are performed by foreign musicians, and the works of foreign composers are performed by Ukrainian performers.

== See also ==
- Kontrasty
- Premieres of the Season (Musical Festival)
