= Karmella Tsepkolenko =

Ukrainian author and composer (born 1955)

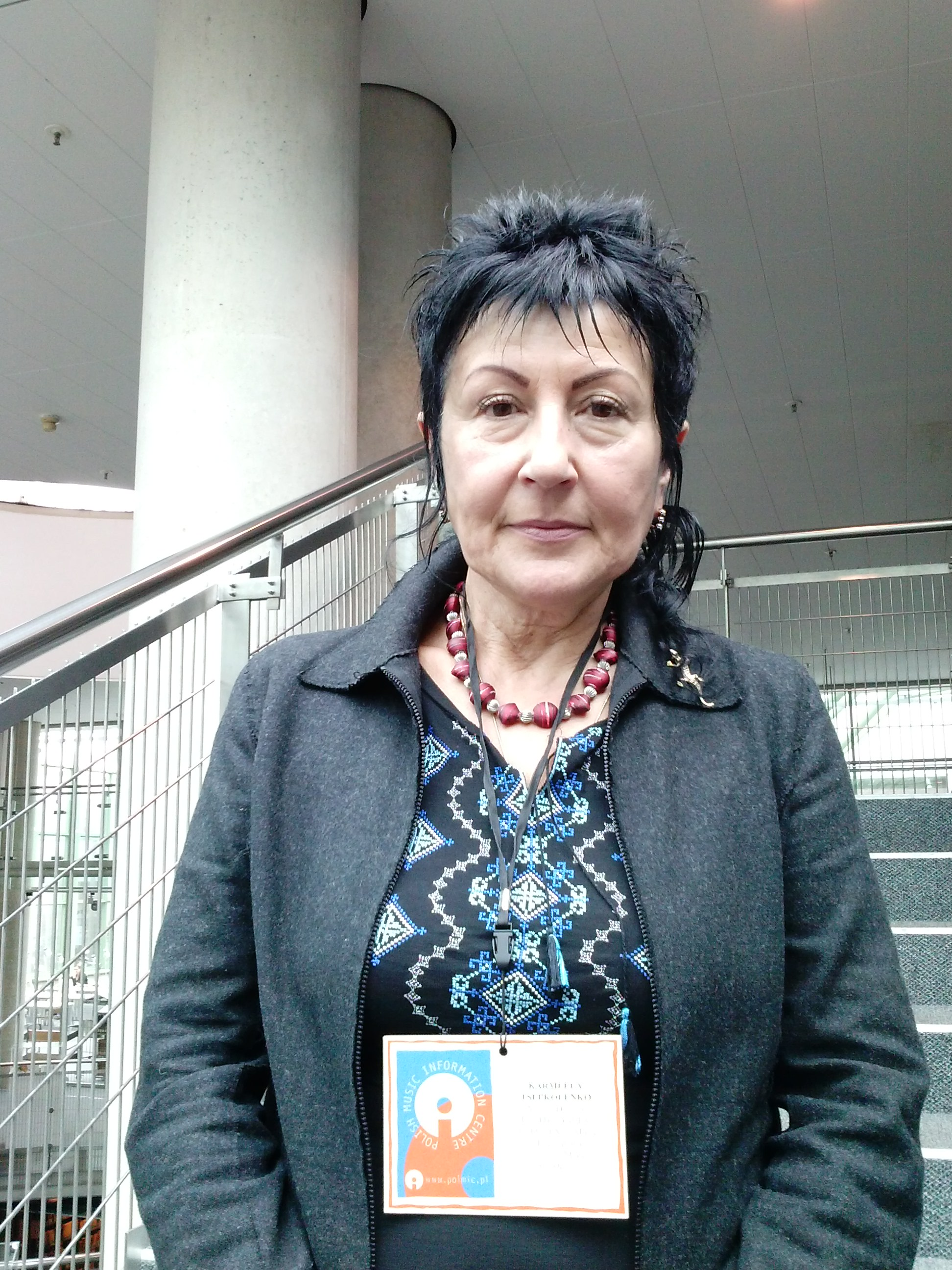
- Born: 20 February 1955; Odesa
- Awards: Shevchenko National Prize

Karmella Tsepkolenko (Ukrainian: Кармелла Семенівна Цепколенко; born 20 February 1955) is a Ukrainian author and composer.

== Biography ==
Karmella Tsepkolenko was born in Odessa, Ukraine. She studied composition from 1973-79 at the Pyotr Stoliarsky Special Music School in Odessa under Aleksandr Kogan and piano under Grigory Buchynsky and Yelena Pannikova. She continued her studies at the Odessa State A.V. Nezhdanova Music Academy with Aleksandr Krasotov for composition and Lyudmyla Ginzburg for piano. After completing her studies, she took a position teaching composition at the Odessa State A.V. Nezhdanova Music Academy in 1980. She entered the PhD program at Moscow Pedagogic University, where she studied under Gennady Tsypin and graduated in 1990.

Tsepkolenko's music has been performed in Europe, Japan and the United States. She has served as artistic director of the Two Days and Two Nights of New Music festival in Odessa, which she founded in 1995, and also served terms as president of the Association New Music in Odessa and the International Society for Contemporary Music (ISCM) in Ukraine.

Tsepkolenko has written professional articles on music and methods of teaching music. In 1990 she co-authored the book Artistic Games with Aleksandr Perepelytsya.

== Honors and awards ==
- Third Prize, USSR All-Union Student Spring Festival in Yerevan (1978)
- Second Prize, USSR All-Union Composers Competition in Moscow (1978)
- Honorable mention in the Carl-Maria-von-Weber Competition in Dresden (1983)
- Prize of the Rendezvous International du Piano en Creuse, France (1990, 1993)
- Boris Lyatoshynsky National Prize (2001)
- Mention, Tvoi Imena Odessa Competition (2002)
- Shevchenko National Prize (2024)

== Selected works ==
Tsepkolenko has composed more than 70 works for stage, orchestra, chamber ensembles, vocal performance, piano, organ, and multimedia. She has written three opera. Selected works include:

- Glorification of the Four Elements
- Tonocolori from the book Artistic Games
- Duel Duo No. 5
- Duel-Duo No.6 (Дуель-Дует №6) for 2 violas (1997)
- Night Preference for clarinet, percussion, cello and piano
- Parallels chamber symphony (1990)
- Symphony No. 4 for symphony orchestra (2004)
- Solo-Momento No.3 (Соло-Моменто №3) for viola solo (2003)
- Duel-Duo No. 9 for piano and percussion (2003)
- Vergessener Völker Müdigkeiten... Friedhofstück ("Forgotten Peoples' Exhaustion...) (2000)
- "Konzert der Vögel ("Concert of the Birds"; "Koncert ptakhiv"), Opera and music-theatre, libretto by Djevad Karahasan in German (1996)
- Dorian's Fate, Opera (2004)
- Heute abend Boris Godunow, Opera and music-theatre, Libretto by Kristine Tornquist in German (2008)

Her compositions have been recorded and issued on more than twelve CD, including:

- Various Works Audio CD
- Piano Music Dinescu/K. Tsepkolenko Audio CD
- Karmella Tsepkolenko (piano) CD Association New Music
