= National Union of Composers of Ukraine =

Ukrainian music organization

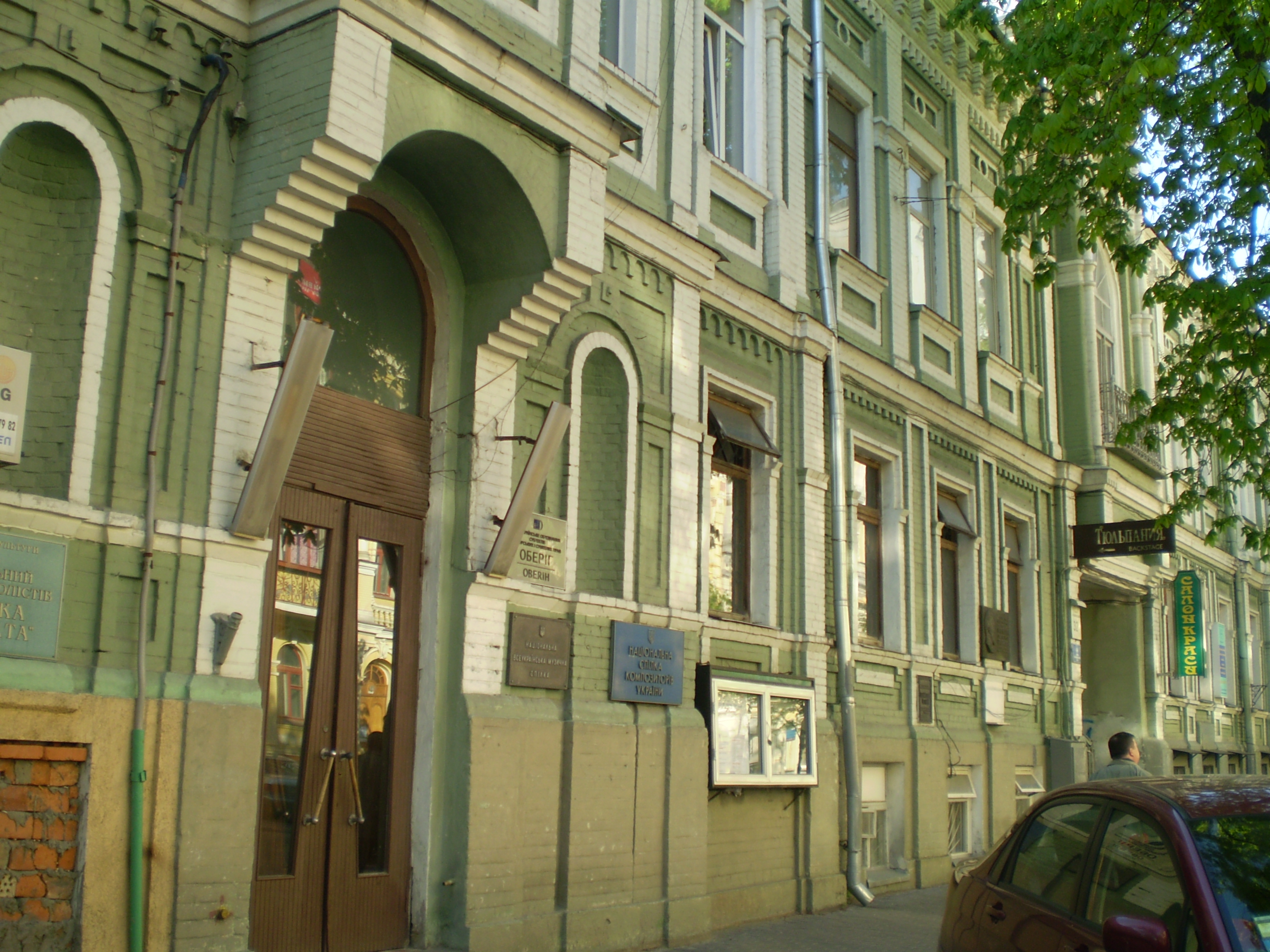
Composers Union building in Kyiv

The National Union of Composers of Ukraine (Ukrainian: Національна спілка композиторів України, romanized: Natsionalna spilka kompozytoriv Ukrainy) is a public organization that unites Ukrainian composers and musicologists working in academic music. Potential members must have completed a full course of higher education and produced a significant body of work.

== History ==
The organization's precursor started as the All-Ukrainian Music Society (named after Mykola Leontovych), established in 1922. In 1928, it was renamed the All-Ukrainian Society of Revolutionary Musicians, and four years later, in November 1932, it was replaced by the Union of Soviet Musicians of Ukraine per a resolution of the Central Committee of the Communist Party of the USSR. This is considered the founding date of the modern union.

Regional unions were formed in Kharkiv (1932), Odesa (1937) and Lviv (1940). In 1939, the organization was renamed the Union of Soviet Composers of Ukraine, and then, in 1959, the Union of Composers of Ukraine.

According to Cherkashina-Gubarenko, "The union itself had its own methods of regulating creative life. Different groups received different weight in the eyes of the party leadership at all levels, from secretaries for ideological issues of district committees, regional committees to the Central Committee of the party. The division into groups had several separate levels. The entire union mass was divided into leaders and ordinary members. Whoever was a member of the board, even more so – became secretary or chairman of the union, turned in the eyes of party ideologues into a leading union detachment, which was to implement official policy and carry out the ideological direction of all union work. The sphere of influence of the top management included, among other things, such functions as the distribution of material goods, recommendations for new works to be performed and further propaganda. It is clear that the works of secretaries were given priority in the execution of government orders, in the formation of concert programs. They were the first to receive honorary titles, awards and prizes, were members of various councils, committees, boards, ie had the opportunity to actively influence the overall picture and state cultural policy, to form public opinion"

The Union has been chaired by:

- Borys Lyatoshynsky (1939–1941)
- Kostiantin Dankevych (1941 and 1956–1967)
- Levko Revutsky (1944–1948)
- Hryhoriy Veryovka (1948–1952)
- Pylyp Kozytskiy (1952–1956)
- Heorhiy Maiboroda (1967–1969)
- Andriy Shtoharenko (1969–1989)
- Yevhen Stankovych (1990–1993)
- Mykhailo Stepanenko (1993–2004)
- Myroslav Skoryk and Yevhen Stankovych (co-chairs, 2004–2010)
- Ihor Shcherbakov (since 2010)

== Current status ==
As of 2020, the Union has over four hundred members, among them two Heroes of Ukraine, twenty-one People's Artists of Ukraine, sixty-six Honored Art Workers of Ukraine, sixteen Taras Shevchenko National Prize of Ukraine laureates, five academicians, eight corresponding members of the Academy of Arts of Ukraine, thirty-six doctors of sciences, sixty-three professors, thirty-seven Lysenko Prize laureates, twenty-three Lyatoshynsky Prize laureates, twenty-five Revutsky Prize laureates, and seventeen Kosenko Prize laureates.

Each year the Union and its regional organizations hold festivals of contemporary academic music, such as the Kyiv Music Fest, the Premieres of the Season, the Youth Music Forum (Kyiv), the Two Days and Two Nights of New Music (Odesa), Contrasts (Lviv), and Dnieper Stars (Dnipro).

After the Revolution of Dignity, in contrast to the expectations of the artistic elite, the living conditions of Union members have only become more complicated. Appeals have been made to the government over increasing costs due to utility and land fees which endanger the existence of creative unions. In 2015 the government's budget for national unions was cut in half compared to the previous year. This threatened the Union with the loss of its building.

== See also ==
- Premieres of the Season (Musical Festival)

== Links ==
Official site
