= Chopin Music In The Open Air =

International music festival held in Radomysl Castle

Chopin Music In The Open Air Музика Шопена просто неба
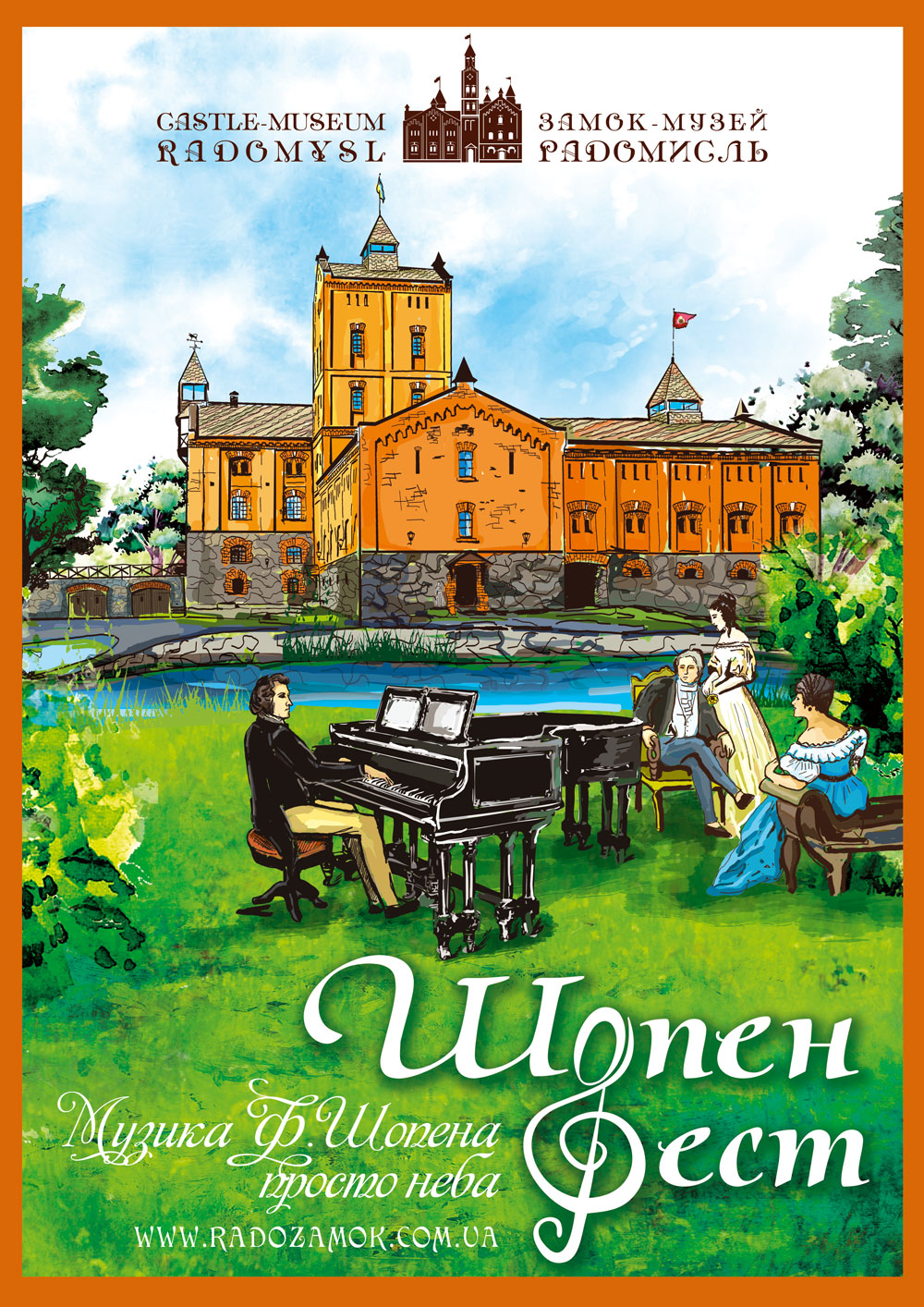
- Nickname: Chopin Fest
- Genre: music festival
- Date: 2014
- Frequency: Annually
- Venue: Radomysl Castle
- Location: Radomyshl
- Country: Ukraine

The Chopin Music In The Open Air or Chopin Fest is an annual international festival of music dedicated to the music of the 19th-century Polish composer Frederic Chopin. The festival has been held in the grounds of Radomysl Castle in Radomyshl, Ukraine since 2014. The festival was founded by the Ukrainian doctor and activist Olga Bogomolets with the support of the Embassy of Poland, Kyiv, the Polish Institute in Kyiv and Radomysl Castle.

Audiences listen to the music outdoors (on one of the islands in the castle). or inside St. Michael's Hall (where pianists perform live music or chamber music concerts are held).

The main aim of the festival is to popularize the works of Chopin among Ukrainians and to facilitate closer contacts between Ukrainian and Polish people.

== History ==
The first Chopin Music In The Open Air Festival was held on June, 14–15, 2014. Its participants were: Piotr Szychowski, the winner of international piano contests in Rome, Bucharest, Takasaki, Darmstadt, Ettlingen, Bydgoszcz, Łódź and Warsaw; Inessa Poroshina, the soloist of the National Philharmonic of Ukraine; Larisa Deordiyeva, the soloist of the National Philharmonic of Ukraine, the winner of the All-Ukrainian Lysenko competition of pianists; the students of music schools in Kyiv.

The 2nd festival had taken place on June 13–14, 2015. Among the participants were: Jacek Kortus, the 1st prize and "Grand Prix" winner of the 10th International Chopin Contest in Antonin (Poland), the 1st prize winner of All-Polish piano contest Competition named after prof. Ludwik Stefański in Płock (Poland); Tatiana Shafran, Inessa Poroshina, the students of music schools in Kyiv and Zhytomyr.

The 3rd festival took place on June, 11–12, 2016.

The 4th festival was held on June, 17–18, 2017 This time its main attraction were young piano players from the Western and Eastern regions of Ukraine. One of the festival's participants, 13-years old Victoria Tkachuk (Radomyshl. Zhytomyr region), took afterwards the Grand-Prix in the prestigious international music contest "The City of Leon" in Lviv.

The 5th festival took place on June, 23–24, 2018. This time its main feature was the promotion of young talented students of musical schools from different Ukraine's regions.

The Chopin Music In The Open Air Festival is attended by the ambassadors of Belgium, Latvia, Moldavia, Romania, Serbia, France, Kyrgyzstan, South Korea, Pakistan, Turkey and Japan in Ukraine.

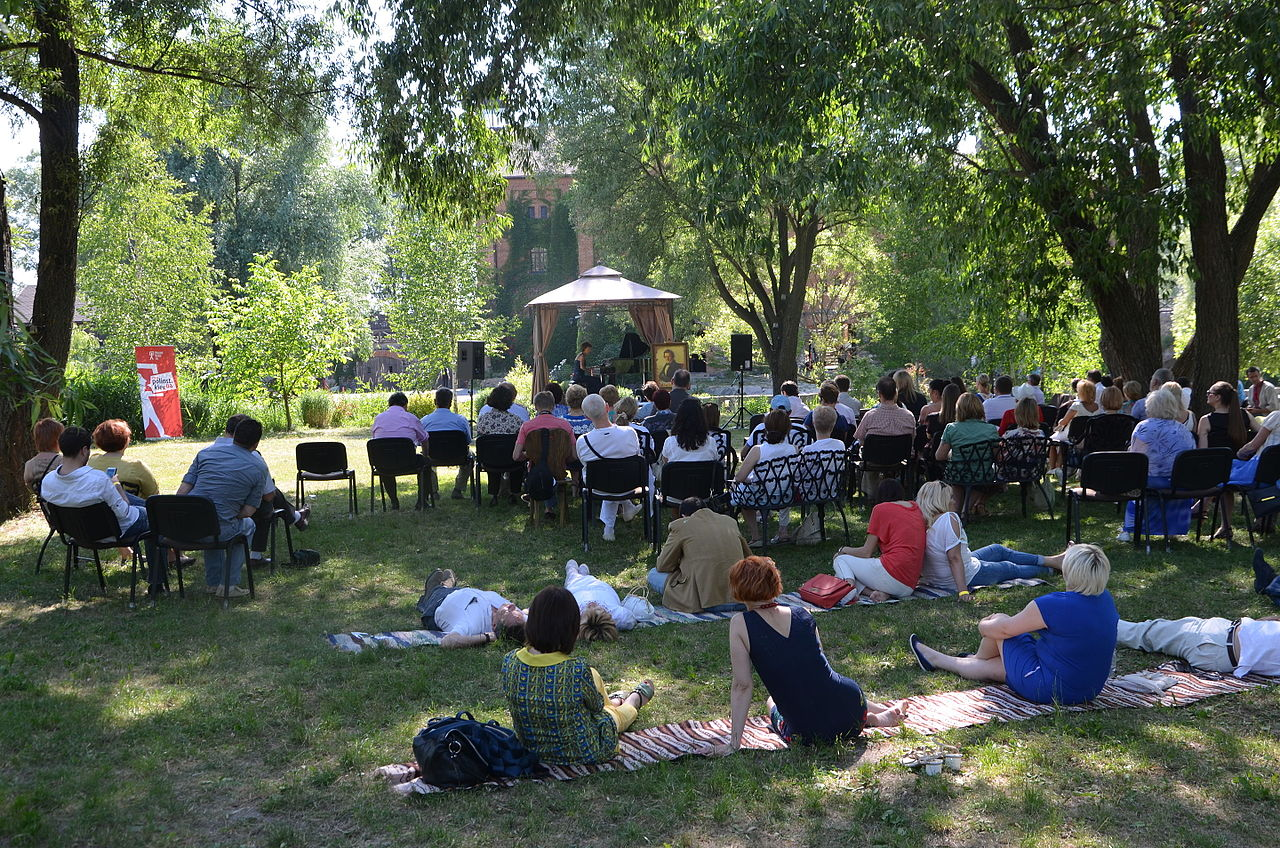
Audience in ChopinFest. Radomyshl, Ukraine

== Charity ==
The festival Chopin Music In The Open Air is charitable. The money from ticket sales are transferred with the help of public project "People helping people" to the families of those killed in the Revolution of Dignity and war in the Eastern Ukraine against Russian occupants. For the same purpose, a charity fair is planned on the third Chopin Festival in Radomyshl.
