= Kyiv Music Fest =

Ukrainian classical music festival

Kyiv Music Fest (Київ Музик Фест)
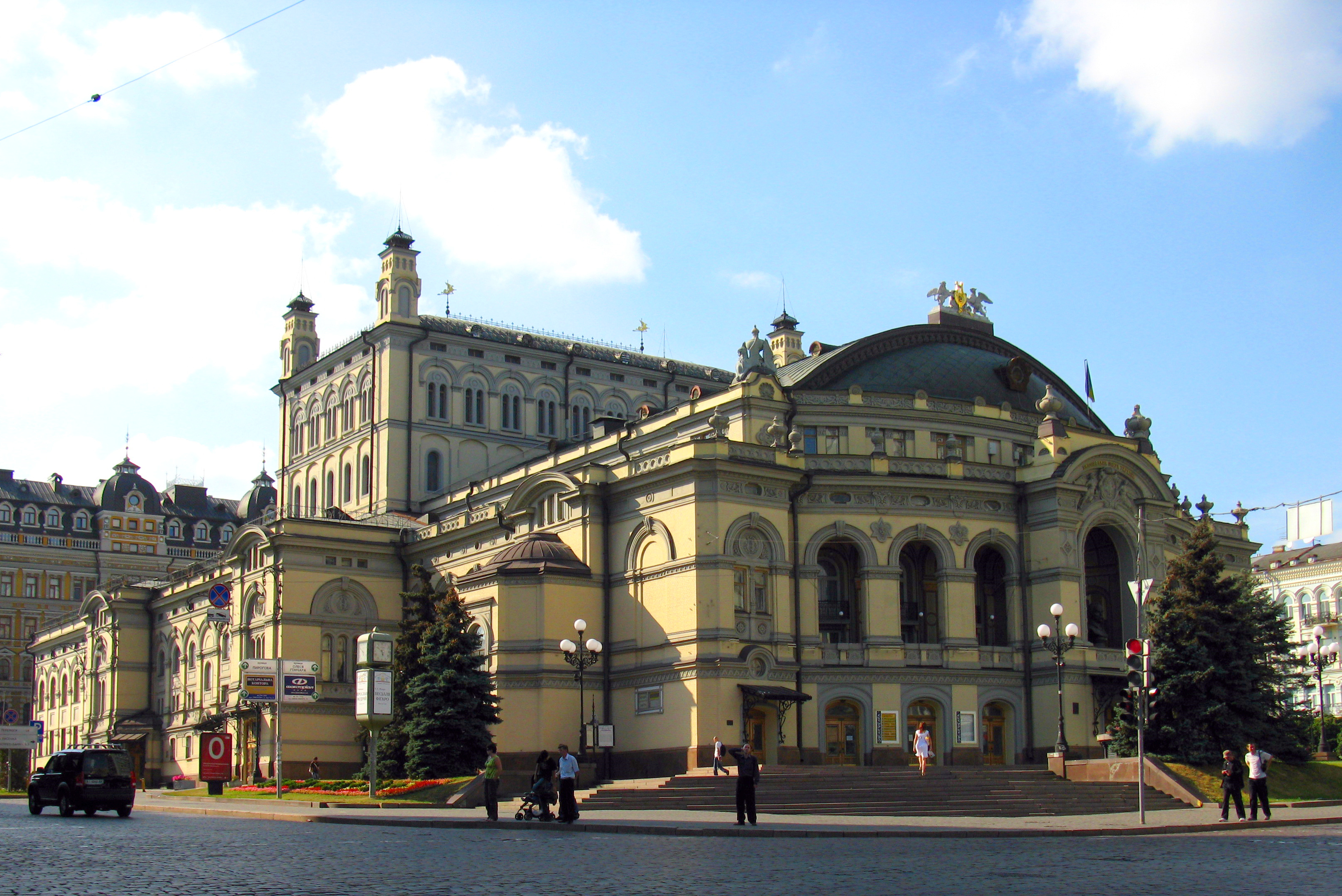
- The National Opera of Ukraine, Kyiv, one of the venues for past Kyiv Music Fest concerts
- Genre: Classical music
- Dates: Late September to early October
- Locations: Kyiv, Ukraine
- Years active: from 1990
- Founders: Ivan Karabyts
- Website: kmf.karabits.com

The Kyiv Music Fest (Ukrainian: Київ Музик Фест), is an annual international music festival in Kyiv, Ukraine, that profiles modern Ukrainian classical music. The festival aims to promote Ukrainian musicians in the context of world art. It was founded by the Ministry of Culture of Ukraine and the National Union of Composers of Ukraine.

The festival is held annually in late September to early October. The festival program features works by modern Ukrainian and foreign composers.

== History ==
Kyiv Music Fest is an annual international music festival held in Kyiv, Ukraine. The festival was first held in 1990. It was the brainchild of the Ukrainian composer Ivan Karabyts, who was the festival's musical director from 1990 to 2001. The co-founders of the festival were the Ministry of Culture of Ukraine and the National Union of Composers of Ukraine.

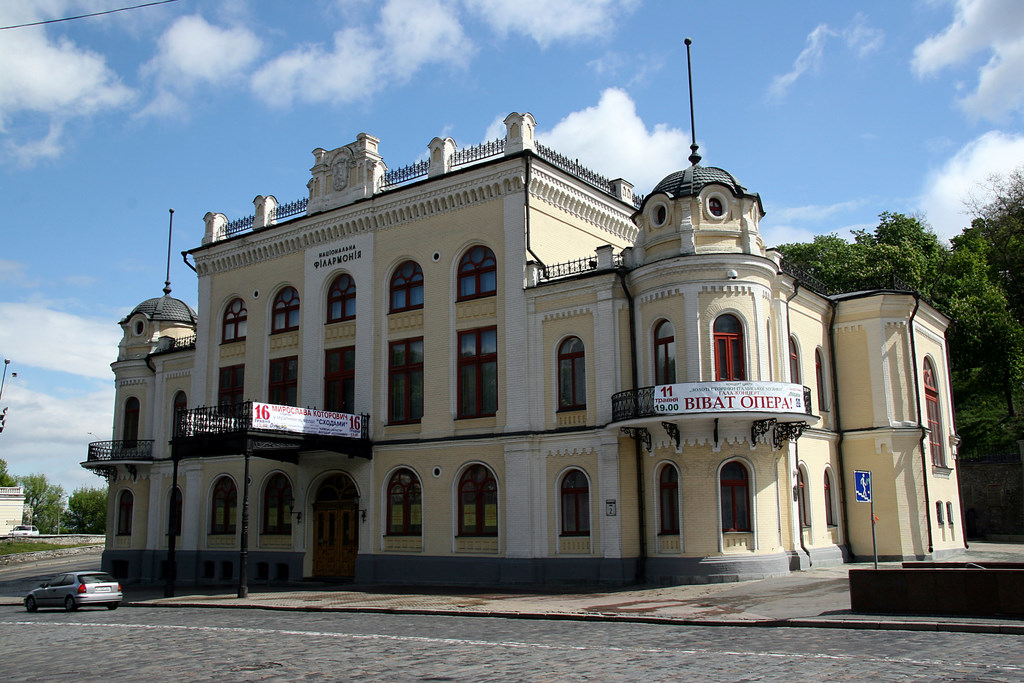
Lysenko Column Hall of the National Philharmonic of Ukraine

Karabyts was succeeded by the Ukrainian composer Myroslav Skoryk, who served as music director from 2002 to 2005, and again from 2013 to 2019. The composer Ivan Nebesnyy directed the festival from 2006 to 2012; since 2020, its director has been the Ukrainian composer Ihor Shcherbakov.

The festival is held annually in late September to early October. The festival, which features contemporary works by composers of all nationalities, aims to promote Ukrainian musicians.

The main venues of the festival have included the National Opera of Ukraine, the National Music Conservatory of Ukraine, the National Organ and Chamber Music Hall of Ukraine (St. Nicholas Roman Catholic Cathedral), the Kyiv Conservatory, the Lysenko Column Hall of the National Philharmonic of Ukraine, and the Kyiv House of Scientists of the National Academy of Sciences of Ukraine.

== See also ==
- Kontrasty
- Premieres of the Season (Musical Festival)

== Sources ==
- Gurkova, Olga (2011). "Іван Карабець є фундатор Міжнародного музичного фестивалю "Київ Мизик Фест"" [Ivan Karabets, the founder of the International Music Festival "Kyiv Myzyk Fest"] (PDF). Ukrainian Musicology (in Ukrainian). 37: 432–445. Archived from the original (PDF) on 27 December 2013.
