= LvivMozArt =

Classical music festival in Ukraine

- Genre: Classical music
- Locations: Lviv and Brody, Ukraine
- Years active: 2017-present
- Founders: Oksana Lyniv
- Attendance: 9,500 (2019)
- Website: lvivmozart.com

The LvivMozArt festival is an annual international classical music festival held in Lviv and Brody, and their surroundings, in Ukraine. It is named in honor of Franz Xaver Wolfgang Mozart, son of Wolfgang Amadeus Mozart, who lived in Lviv from 1808 to 1838.

LvivMozArt combines contemporary academic music and classical pieces performed by musicians from multiple European countries, the United States and South Africa. Its last pre-pandemic edition in 2019 drew 9,500 spectators.

On August 28, the festival hosted the concert "Ark Ukraine: 10 Centuries of Ukrainian Music", which was previously presented on August 22 in Kyiv.

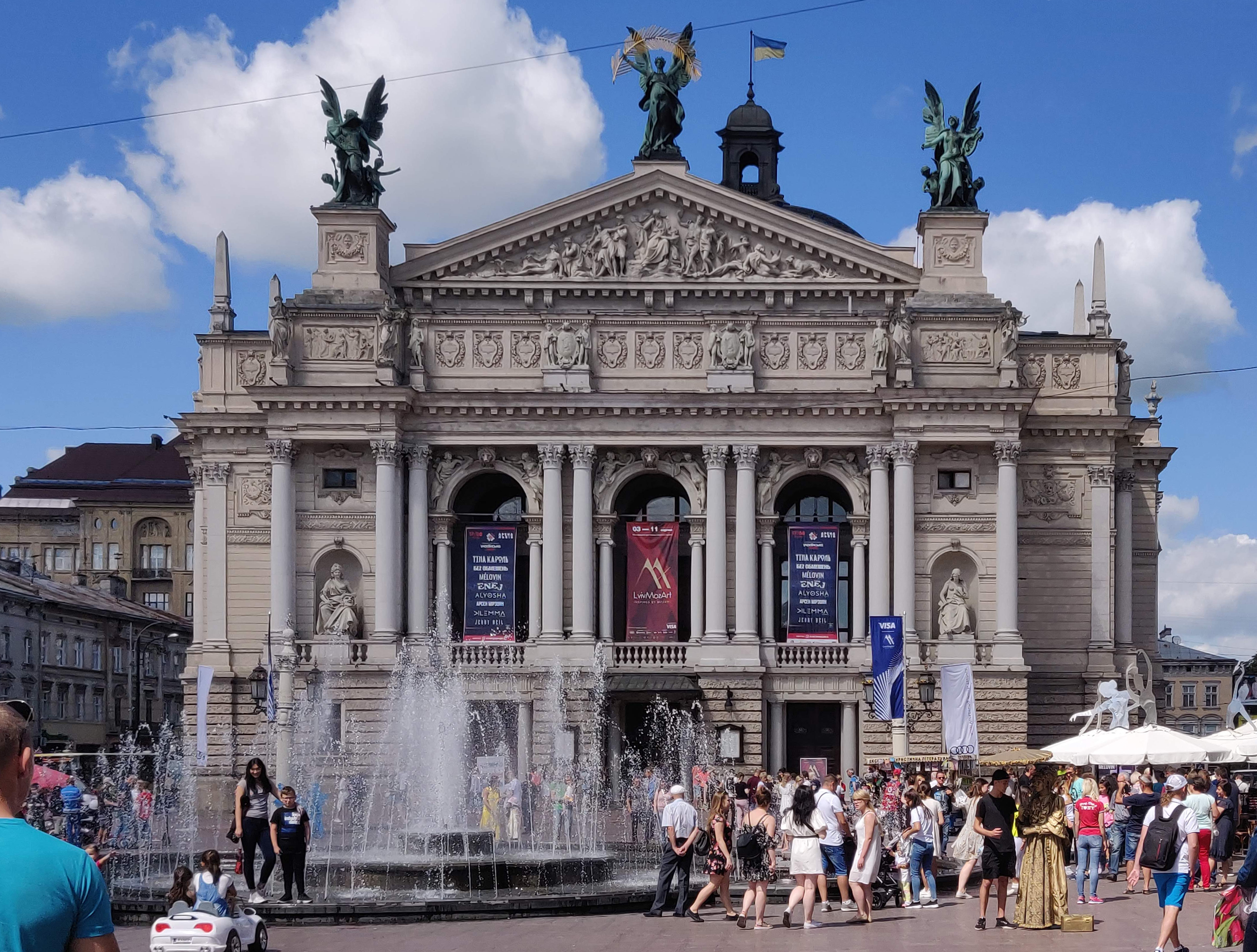
Lviv Opera House hosts some concerts of the LvivMozArt Festival

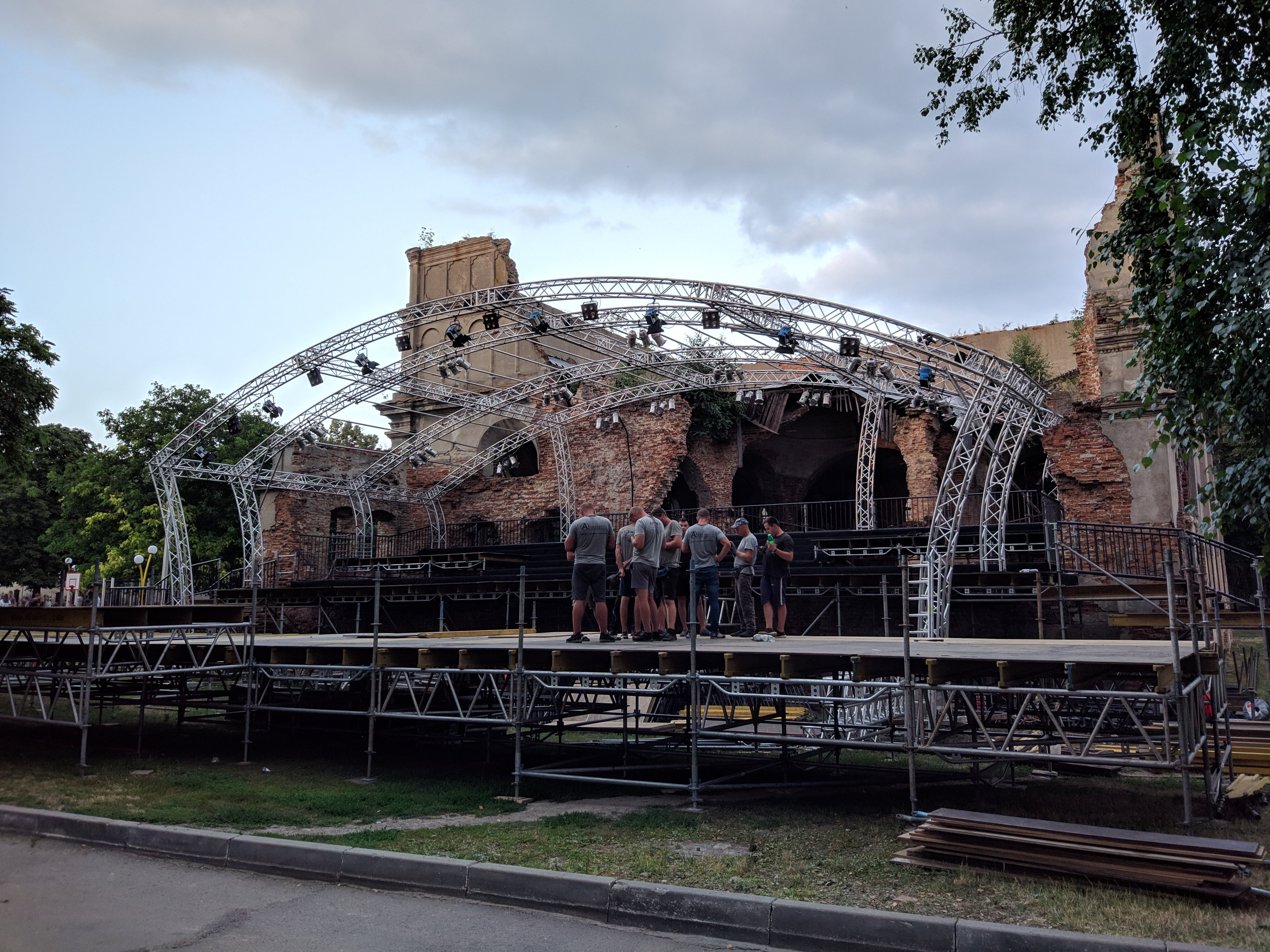
A scene from the open-air LvivMozArt in Brody.
