= List of festivals in Ukraine =

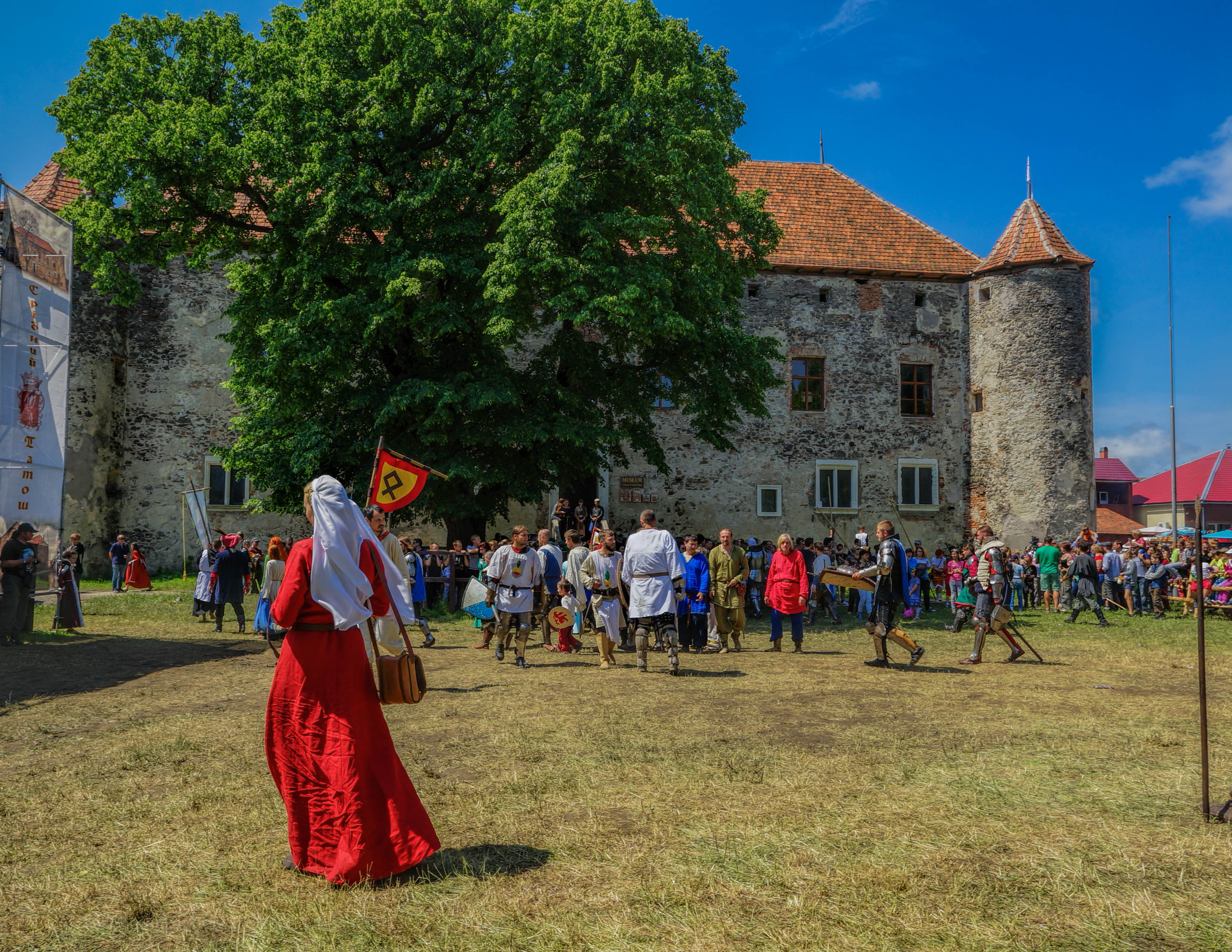
Thousands of tourists visit the festival of Silver Tatosh in the castle of Saint-Miklos, Chynadiiovo, Zakarpattia Oblast.

This following list is a list of festivals in Ukraine.

Festivals in Ukraine include a variety of cultural, music, film, and traditional events. they are celebrated across the country throughout the year. These festivals showcase the country’s cultural diversity and traditions.

These festivals are held across cities such as Kyiv, Lviv, and Odesa.

== Music ==
Festival	Description	Venue	Year	Reference
Atlas Weekend	It is an annual music and arts festival held in the at the Expocenter of Ukraine in Kyiv,Ukraine.	Kyiv	Since 2015	
ART JAZZ	It is an international jazz festival. It is one of the most famous festivals in Ukraine.	Rivne, Lutsk	Since 2007	
Be Free	Be Free is a Belarusian rock festival that takes place in Ukraine since 2007.	Different cities each year	Since 2007	
Faine Misto	It is an annual charity music festival often celebrated in Lviv or Ternopol.	Lviv or Ternopol	Since 2013	
Fort.Missia	It is an annual arts and music festival held between 2009 and 2012.	Popovychi, Lviv Oblast	2009 - 2012	
Gogolfest	Gogolfest is an annual international festival of contemporary art and cinema. It is dedicated to the famous writer Mykola Gogol. The festival showcases theater, music, film, literature, and visual art.	Kyiv	Since 2007	
Kyiv Music Fest	It is an annual international music festival held in Kyiv.	Kyiv	Since 1990s	
Leopolis Jazz Fest	It is an international jazz festival annually held in June.	Lviv	Since 2011	
Koktebel Jazz Festival	Koktebel Jazz Festival is a jazz and world music festival in Ukraine.	Koktebel (before 2014) Zatoka and Bilhorod-Dnistrovskyi (after 2014)	Since 2003	
Kraina Mriy	It is a multi-day festival of ethnically Ukrainian music.	Different cities each year	Since 2004	
Two Days and Two Nights of New Music	It is an annual 48-hour music festival held in Odesa, Ukraine. The festival features new music from both Ukrainian and international artists. It was founded by Karmella Tsepkolenko in 1995.	Odesa	Since 1995	
Zaxidfest	Zaxidfest is an annual international music and art festival held in the middle of August. Zaxid was founded in 2009.	Lviv	Since 2009	

== Film ==
Festival	Description	Venue	Year	Reference
Docudays UA	It is the only human rights film festival in Ukraine. It is annually held in Kyiv.	Kyiv	Since 2004	
Golden Duke	It is an all-Union film festival. It was named after the first mayor of Odessa, Armand Emanuel du Plessis, Duke de Richelieu	Odesa	1988 to 1994	
Kyiv International Film Festival	It is an annual film festival held in Kyiv in late May and early June.	Kyiv	2009—2011	
Kyiv International Short Film Festival	It is an annual festival held in Kyiv and aimed at acquainting audiences with international short films.	Kyiv	Since 2012	
Molodist International Film Festival	It is an international film festival which takes place every October in Kyiv.	Kyiv	Since 1970	
Odesa International Film Festival	It is an annual film festival held in the middle of July in Odesa.	Odesa	Since 2010	
Open Night Film Festival	It is an annual Ukrainian-language cinema event founded in 1997 by Mykhailo Illienko to promote local filmmaking.	Kyiv	Since 1997	
Wiz-Art Film Festival	It is an annual International Short Film Festival, which takes place in Lviv. The festival was started by art formation Wiz-Art, which was founded in 2008	Lviv	Since 2008	

== Culture ==
Festival	Description	Venue	Year	Reference
Ancient Lviv	Ancient Lviv is an international festival of medieval culture in Lviv. It was designed to immerse guests in the atmosphere of the 15th century.	Lviv	2006 and 2010	
Book Forum Lviv	Book Forum Lviv is the biggest book fair in Ukraine	Lviv	Since 1994	
Etnovyr	Etnovyr is the annual International Folklore Festival that has taken place in Lviv on the eve of Ukraine Independence Day since 2008	Lviv	Since 2008	
Forpost Fest	Forpost Fest is a Ukrainian medieval and culture festival. It is held in August.	Kamianets-Podilskyi	Unknown	
Haydamaka	Haydamaka is a Ukrainian Cossack martial arts festival	Kyiv	Since 2008	
Humorina	Humorina is an annual festival of humor held in Odesa on April Fools' Day	Odesa	Since 1973	
Silver Tatosh	Silver Tatosh is an annual medieval culture festival held at the St. Miklos Castle	Chynadiyovo	Since 2013	

== Cooking ==
Festival	Description	Venue	Year	Reference
Borscht in a Clay Pot	It is a food festival held on the second Saturday of August.	Opishnia, Poltava region	Since 2014	
Lviv Cheese and Wine Festival	It is a food festival held in Lviv.	Lviv	Since 2014	
National Cuisine Festival	It is a celebration of traditional Ukrainian cuisine and folk art	Lutsk	2012 to 2018	

== Sports ==
Festival	Description	Venue	Year	Reference
Hot Air Balloon Festival	It is a premier Ukrainian aeronautical event. It is held twice yearly in May and October.	Kamianets-Podilskyi	Since 1998	
Leopolis Grand Prix	Leopolis Grand Prix is an international festival of retro cars held in Ukraine.	Lviv	Since 2011	

== See also ==
- Tourism in Ukraine
- List of museums in Ukraine
- Ukrainian cuisine
- Ukrainian culture
- Ukrainian historical regions
