= Khamerman znyshchuye virusy =

Ukrainian punk rock band

Khamerman znyshchuye virusy Хамерман знищує віруси
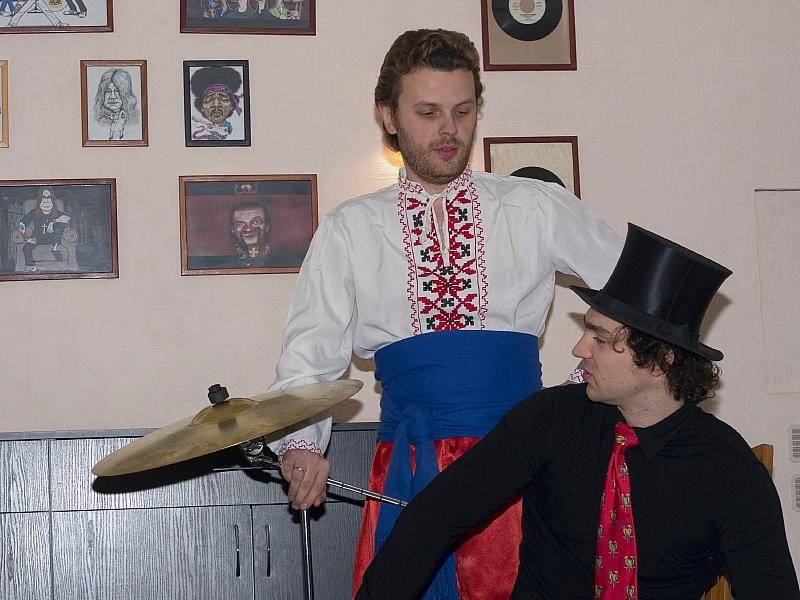
- KhZV (Tsukrenko on the left, Pakholiuk on the right)

Background information
- Origin: Sumy, Ukraine
- Genres: Punk rock, techno-punk, drum and bass, pop music
- Years active: 1996–present
- Members: Albert Tsukrenko, Volodymyr Pakholiuk
- Past members: Mykhailo Kapusta, Pavlo Sypalo

Khamerman znyshchuye virusy (Ukrainian: Хамерман знищує віруси, literally translated as Hammerman destroys viruses or Hammerman kills bugs), also known under the abbreviation KhZV (Ukrainian: ХЗВ) is a Ukrainian punk rock band. It is currently active as a duo consisting of musicians Albert Tsukrenko and Volodymyr Pakholiuk.

== History ==
KhZV was established in 1996 in Sumy by Mykhailo Kapusta, Albert (Oleh) Tsukrenko, Pavlo Sypalo and Volodymyr Pakholiuk. The name of the band was inspired by a faulty translation of a phrase in a film heard by one of the band's members. In 1999 the band became laureates of the Chervona Ruta festival, and in 2000 they won the contest "Pearls of the Season". Since 2001 KhZV has produced 7 albums. They were also headliners of a number of music festivals in Ukraine, including Fayne Misto (Ternopil) and Zaxidfest.

In 2006 the band moved to Kyiv. After the full-scale invasion of Ukraine by Russia members of the band have organized auctions for the benefit of soldiers and donated money from tickets for the needs of the Armed Forces of Ukraine.

== Composition ==
The band's current members are Volodymyr Pakholiuk (texts, vocals) and Albert Tsukrenko (music, vocals). Both musicians combine their career in the band with other activities: Tsukrenko is known as a journalist and podcaster, having worked, among others, for Pershyi and Hromadske TV channels; Pakholiuk initially worked as a teacher, but later also became a journalist, working as deputy editor of a men's magazine.

== Musical style ==
KhZV have been variously characterized as an underground punk band or a freak duo. The band's creative activity transcends the borders of music and includes elements of theatre and concept art. Their musical genre includes elements of drum and bass, techno-punk, pop music and chanson. Their texts are characterized by irony and satire, including elements of surzhyk and obscenities. According to Tsukrenko, the use of obscene words is grounded in the band's need for artistic expression and signifies the vitality of Ukrainian culture. The band's members usually perform naked or wear unusual clothes, such as diapers, wedding shawls, leopard dresses, female lingerie, wooden boxes, diving masks, models of Lenin's Mausoleum on their heads or just one pair of socks for two.

== Scandals ==
In 2018 the band's performance at a festival in Ivano-Frankivsk prompted the city's mayor Ruslan Martsinkiv to order a blessing of the venue by priests. Local authorities also sent a complaint to the police, as according to them the musicians' performance went contrary to Christian morale and contained elements of hooliganism. Nevertheless, this case led to the growth of the band's popularity.

In 2022 Albert Tsukrenko was excluded from the list of experts of the Ukrainian Cultural Foundation due to "violation of moral norms". However, next year a court ruled that decision to be illegal, as it found no proof of any violations.

In January 2024 the band's performance at the Drahobrat skiing resort in Zakarpattia region was condemned by Ukraine's deputy prime minister Iryna Vereshchuk due to the band members' lack of clothing. Vereshchuk called for a ban on performances of this type until the end of the Russo-Ukrainian War.

== Selected discography ==
=== Albums ===
- Millennium Hits (Ukrainian: Millennium Хітз) (2001)
- Kuy (Ukrainian: Куй) (2010)
- Loy (Ukrainian: Лой) (2018)
