= List of music festivals in Ukraine =

This is a list of historical and current musical festivals held in Ukraine, classified by musical genre.

== Classical music ==
- Kharkiv Music Festival (since 2018)
- Kontrasty (since 1995)
- Kos-Anatolsky Festival (since 1987)
- Kyiv Music Fest (since 1990)
- LvivMozArt (since 2017)
- MTKM (2008)
- Muzychni imprezy Ukrainy (since 2016)
- Premieres of the Season (since 1989)

== Popular music ==
- ArtPole (2009–2013)
- Atlas (since 2015)
- Chervona Ruta (since 1989)
- Cheremosh-Fest (2013–2015)
- Crimea Music Fest (2011–2012)
- Franko Fest (2012–2013)
- Holosiieve-88 (1988-early 1990s)
- Kraina Mriy (since 2004)
- MakhnoFest (2006–2010)
- Mazepa-Fest (2003–2016)
- Mlynomania (2007–2013)
- Moloda Halychyna (since 1992)
- MRPL City (2017–2021)
- Nivroku (1991–2001, 2004–2006, 2008)
- Obnova (2008–2021)
- Perlyny Sezonu (1995–2008)
- Pid Pokrovom Tryzuba (2016–2021)
- Pisennyi Spas (since 2015)
- Sheshory (2003–2008)
- She.Fest (since 2014)
- Stare Misto (2007–2013)
- Tavriyski Ihry (1992–2008)
- UPark Festival (2016, 2018–2021)
- Viter zi Skhodu (1992–1993)
- VyVykh (1990, 1992)
- Zashkiv, Festival (since 2006)
- Zaxidfest (since 2009)

== Particular genres ==
=== Alternative music ===
- Alternatyva (1994–1995, 2003)

=== Electronic music ===
- Hamselyt (since 2012)
- KaZantip (1992–2013)
- SkyGravity (2005–2009)

=== Experimental music ===
- 2D2N (since 1995)

=== Folk music ===
- Dolia (since 1992)
- Gogolfest (2007–2022)
- Koliada na Maizliakh (since 2010)

=== Folk rock ===
- Dzvin (1990–1992)
- Pidkamin (2007–2013)
- Rok-Koliada (2009–2012)

=== Gothic rock ===
- Dity Nochi: Chorna Rada (2000, 2005–2013, 2016)

=== Jazz music ===
- Chernihiv Jazz Open (2010–2014)
- DoDzh (1969–1981, 1996, 2001–2013)
- Jazz on the Dnieper (1968–1971, 1973, 1981–1983, 1987–1988, 1999, 2006, 2016–2019)
- Koktebel Jazz Festival (since 2003)
- Leopolis Jazz Fest (since 2011)
- Master-Jam Fest (2013)

=== Metal music ===
- Asgardsrei festival (since 2014)
- Kolovorot (1998–2010, 2017)
- Zavantazhennia (2012–2015)

=== Retro music ===
- Bohdan Vesolovskyi international retro music festival (2015, 2017–2019)

=== Rock music ===
- Bandershtat (2007–2021)
- BarRockKo (2007, 2017–2019, 2021)
- Be Free (festival) (2007–2009)
- BezHeMeO (2010–2013)
- Chayka Open Air (2000–2009)
- Dunai Rock (2014–2019)
- Faine Misto (since 2013)
- Fort.Missia (2009–2011)
- Global East Festival (2009–2011)
- Hnizdo (2004–2009)
- kRok (2007–2012)
- Potiah do Yaremche (2008–2012)
- Prosto Rock (1997, 1999–2002, 2012)
- Respublica (since 2011)
- Rock-Existence (1996–2000, 2002–2005)
- Rock SIch (2006–2013)
- Rurysko (2010–2011, 2013)
- Ruynatsiya (2006–2012)
- Skhid-Rock (since 2013)
- Slavic Rock (2006–2013)
- Slavske Rock (2007–2011, 2016)
- Taras Bulba (1991–1994, 2002–2013, since 2017)
- Vorskla-Rock'n'Ball (2011–2013)
- Woodstock Ukraine (2012–2018)

=== Romance music ===
- Autumn Rendezvous (since 2001)

=== World music ===
- Trypilske kolo (2008–2015)
