= Shynkaruk =

Shynkaruk or Shinkaruk (Ukrainian: Шинкарук) is a Ukrainian patronymic surname derived from the surname or nickname Shynkar, 'shynok (tavern) keeper'. Notable people with the surname include:

- Hunter Shinkaruk (born 1994), Canadian ice hockey player
- Iryna Shynkaruk (born 1979), Ukrainian singer
