= Halyna Batkovska =

Ukrainian singer

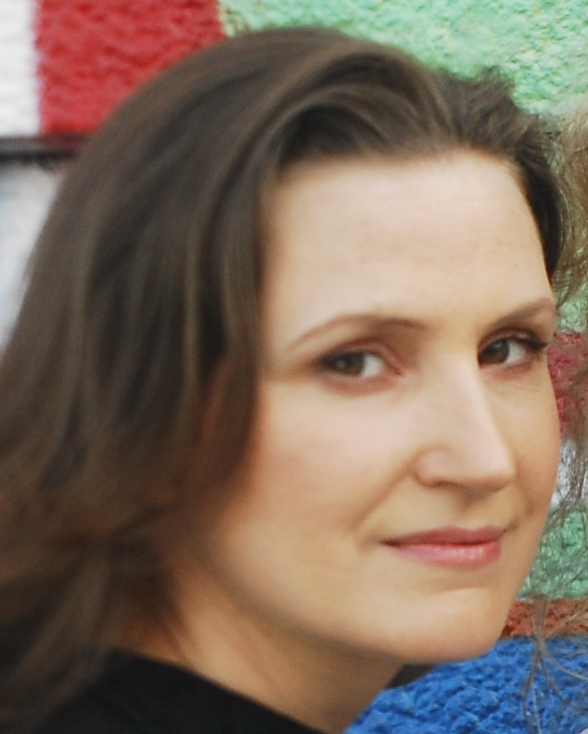
- Born: May 23, 1965 (age 60); Kyiv, Ukraine
- Occupations: Singer, writer

Halyna Batkovska (also known as Halyna Telnyuk; Ukrainian: Гали́на Станісла́вівна Батько́вська; born May 23, 1965, Kyiv) is a Ukrainian singer, member of The Telnyuk Sisters, Merited Artist of Ukraine (2009), and People's Artist of Ukraine (2019).

== Biography ==
She was born on May 23, 1965, in Kyiv to the family of writer Stanislav Telnyuk and editor-translator Nelli Kopylova. She studied at Kyiv school No. 58.

She graduated from the Institute of Journalism at Taras Shevchenko National University of Kyiv. As a third-year student, she had already hosted several original programs on Ukrainian Public Radio. Later she worked there as a music program editor. She also worked for the magazine Knowledge and Labor, and as a journalist for the newspaper Literary Ukraine.

As a singer, together with her sister Lesya, she performs in the musical duo, The Telnyuk Sisters. She is the diploma winner of the All-Ukrainian Festival "Chervona Ruta" (1989, Chernivtsi; 1991, Zaporizhzhia).

== Awards ==
- Merited Artist of Ukraine (2009)
- People's Artist of Ukraine (2019)
