= Chervona Ruta (festival) =

Ukrainian biennial music festival

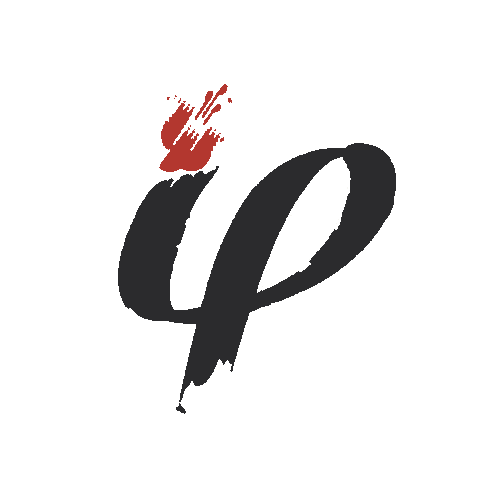
- Logo of Chervona Ruta festival
- Genre: Pop; folk; art rock
- Location: Various cities in Ukraine
- Years active: 1989–present

Chervona Ruta (Ukrainian: Червона рута) is a permanent biennial all-Ukrainian youth festival of contemporary song and popular music, which has been held every two years since 1989. It was a benchmark where more Ukrainian popular music was presented transitioning away from traditional Ukrainian folk culture associated with "sharovarshchyna" genre. Unlike the Soviet festival 'Song of the Year' (Russian: Песня года, romanized: Pesnya goda), where only a selected song from Ukraine sometimes was demonstrated, Chervona Ruta allowed more singers and songs.

The festival is dedicated to Ukrainian songwriter, composer and poet Volodymyr Ivasyuk who is the author and composer of the widely popular Ukrainian song "Chervona Ruta". The name may refer to a mythological or actual species of flowering plants Chervona ruta.

== History ==
The idea and the name of the festival belongs to journalist Ivan Lepsha, which was realized by Taras Melnyk, Kyrylo Stetsenko, Anatoliy Kalenychenko, Oleh Repetskyi and Ivan Malkovych. The festival played an important role in the revival of Ukrainian popular music and contributed to the Ukrainian music boom of the 90s.

Until start of the Soviet reforms such "perestroika" (The Reform) in 1986 along with "Glasnost" and "Uskoreniye", the rock music throughout the Soviet Union was a taboo. But, there were some exclusions such as the 1980 Georgian "Spring Rhythms". There was saying that today you play the jazz (implying any music of the capitalist West created by negroes, according to the Great Soviet Encyclopedia) and tomorrow you will sell your Homeland (Russian: Сегодня ты играешь джаз, а завтра Родину продашь).

=== First edition – Chernivtsi 1989 ===
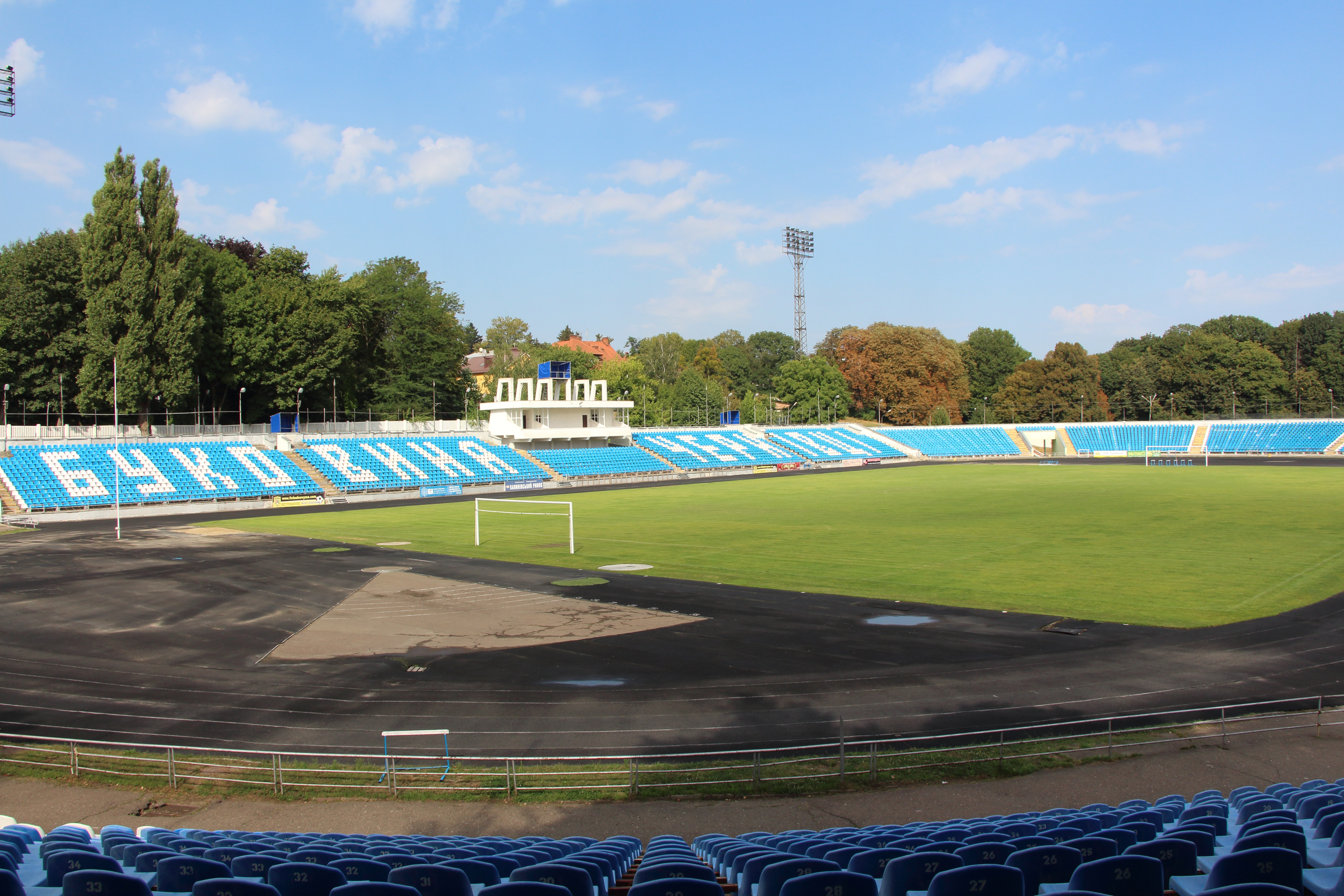
Bukovyna Stadium, on which the inaugural edition of the festival was held

The first Chervona Ruta festival was held on 17–24 September 1989 in Chernivtsi at Bukovyna Stadium. Its organization was supported by the Ukrainian community both in the country and abroad and also involved civic organizations such as the Ukrainian Helsinki Union, People's Movement of Ukraine, Shevchenko Scientific Society, Ukrainian Youth Association, Lion's Society and others. While the festival was conducted under close supervision of the republican KDB (the Ukrainian branch of Soviet KGB), militsiya, and Communist Party of Ukraine, the Ukrainian anthem "Shche ne vmerla" was performed at the festival, and blue and yellow flags were unfurled. Famous bands «Vopli Vidoplyasova», «Braty Hadyukiny», «Kvartyra № 50», «Zymovyy sad», Vika Vradiy, Marichka Burmaka, Tryzuby Stas, and many others participated in rock competitions. In total, there were over 500 performers, including singers from Europe and North America. The festival organizers and jury members were overwhelmed by the sheer number of contestants and the quality of their performances. There was a song to commemorate Volodymyr Ivasyuk who was murdered 10 years before.

The final concert opened with sounds of trembitas, a Ukrainian elongated highland horn. People in the crowd carried symbols of the Ukrainian SSR such as the state emblem of the Ukrainian SSR and the state flag of the Ukrainian SSR, and a large bonfire was started on the playing field.

The festival's grand prize was received by Vasyl Zhdankin, other laureates included "Sestrychka Vika" (Vika Vradiy), "Komu vnyz", "Braty Hadiukiny", Eduard Drach, Viktor Morozov, Taras Kurchyk, Andriy Mykolaichuk, and others. It was Kuban native Zhdankin who spontaneously started to sing the Ukrainian anthem at the festival's closing.

At the final concert, which took place at the central stadium of Chernivtsi, local police cracked down on any manifestations of "nationalism", detaining young girls (many from the popular "Lion Society") who were dressed in yellow blouses and blue skirts. At the stadium Georgi Gongadze was attacked and hit on the head by militsiya.

Rosmay Media Center has made a 6-part film about the history of the festival.

=== Later editions ===
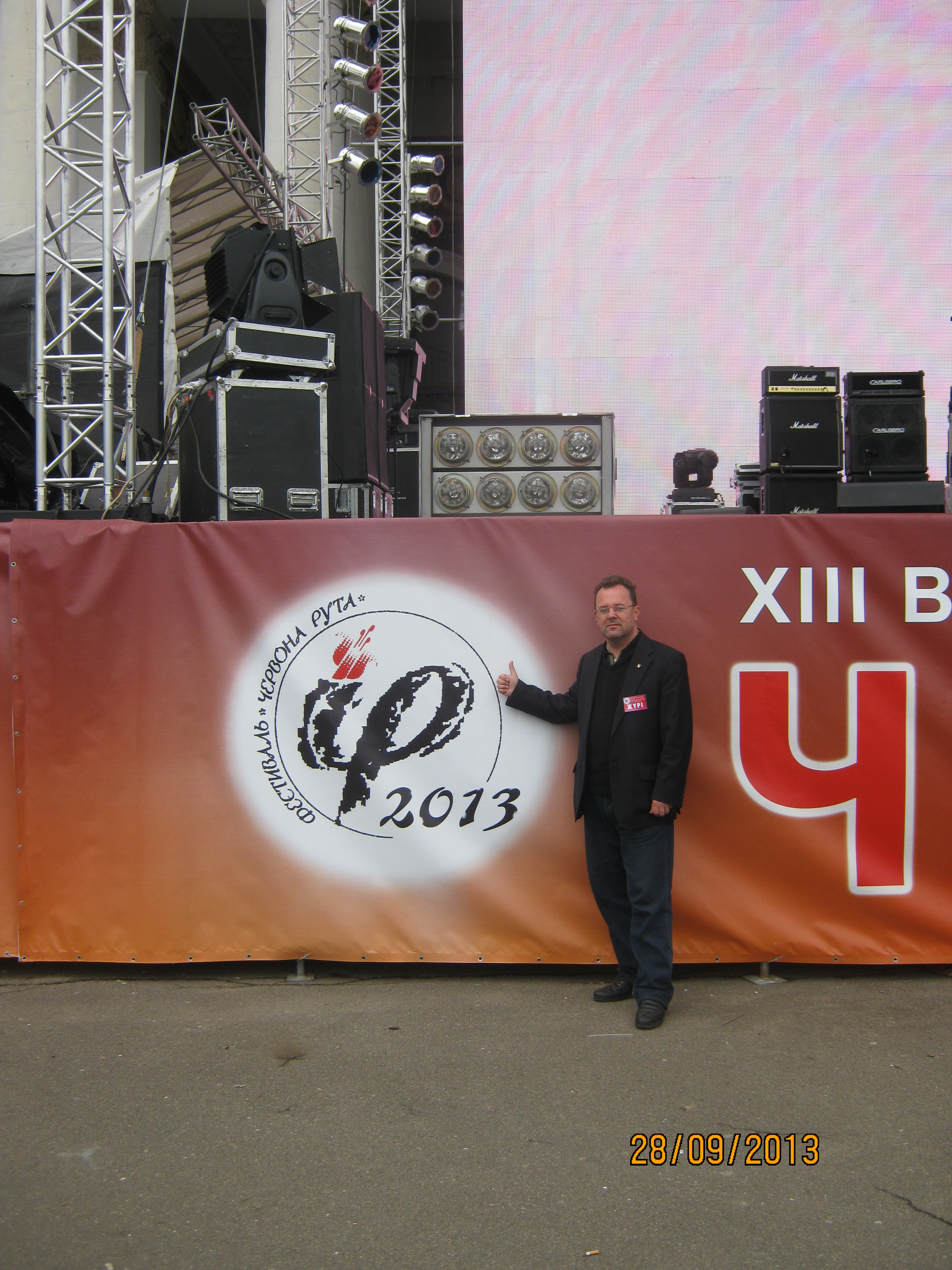
Main scene of the 2013 edition with the festival's logo

The second edition of the festival took place from 10 to 17 August 1991 in Zaporizhzhia and brought accolades to a number of new participants, including Andriy Kill (later known as Skryabin), Plach Yeremiyi, The Telnyuk Sisters, Mertvy Piven. Compared to the first festival, which was visited by approximately 40 ,000 viewers, the event in Zaporizhzhia was seen live by 60,000 people.

The third festival was held in 1993 in Donetsk and saw the rise of future stars like Oleksandr Ponomariov, Iryna Shynkaruk, Viktor Pavlik, Pikkardiyska Tertsiya and Viy. The number of visitors reached 160,000.

The scenes of the fourth "Ruta" in 1995 were shared between the Crimean cities of Sevastopol and Simferopol. That year the contest included young Ukrainian performers like EL Kravchuk, Natalia Mohylevska, Ani Lorak, The VYO, Katia Buzhynska, Motor'rolla and others. The festival was visited by approximately 250,000 viewers.

The fifth edition of "Chervona Ruta" took place in 1997 in Kharkiv. Among notable performers of the contest were Katya Chilly, TNMK and Tartak. 500,000 viewers visited the festival in Kharkiv, and another 500,000 in Kyiv.

In 1999 the festival visited Dnipropetrovsk. Among performers were Dymna Sumish and Spidvey (future #KHORTA). Together with scenes in Kyiv, the performances were seen by approximately 1 million viewers.

The 2001 contest took place in Kyiv and saw performances by Krykhitka Tsakhes and Ocheretianyi Kit.

In 2003, 2005 and 2007 "Chervona Ruta" once again visited Kyiv. The 2003 edition saw the successful debut of Anastasia Kochetova, today better known as MamaRika.

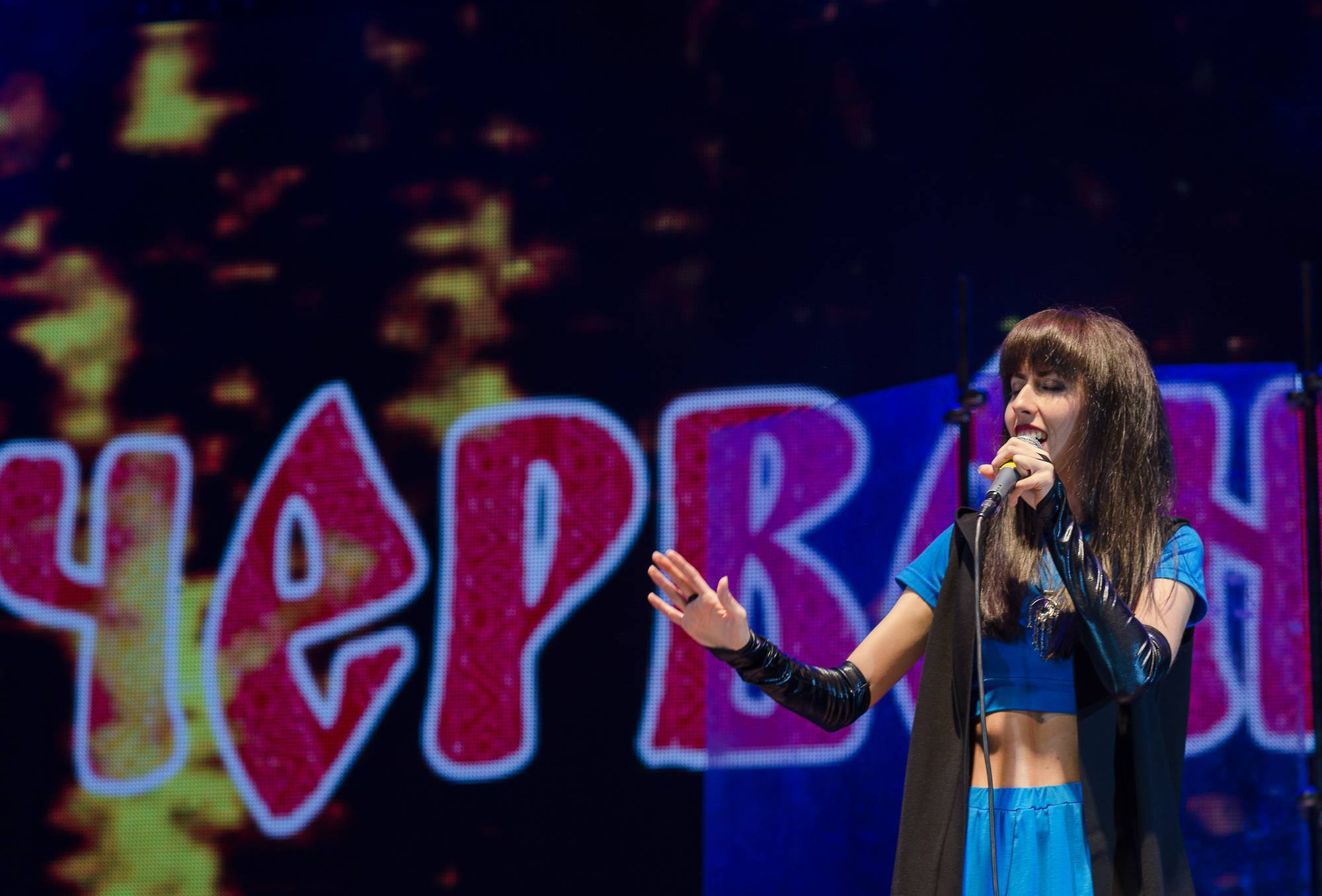
Performance by MniShek at Chervona Ruta-2017

The jubilee 2009 festival returned to Chernivtsi. The prize for acoustic music was won by DakhaBrakha.

The 2011 and 2013 editions Chervona Ruta once again came to Kyiv. The 2013 prize for acoustic music was won by Folknery.

In 2015 and 2017 "Chervona Ruta" festival took place in Mariupol.

In 2019 Chervona Ruta was once again held in Chernivtsi (hometown of Volodymyr Ivasyuk) on 17–22 September. It was the 30th Anniversary of the Festival.

== Impact and Legacy ==
Ruta Fest made a real "revolution" in Ukrainian culture, which impacted wider society. The festival gave birth to new youth music that had not existed before. Previously, Ukrainian youth, without domestic idols, had to settle for variety shows from Moscow, or listen to Western pop stars. Many of the songs performed for the first time at the festival immediately became hits, popular with millions of people. The winners of "Ruta-89" and their songs were the top performers in many charts and polls. Musicians who were relatively obscure only days previously turned into Ukrainian youth idols overnight. For the first time, a large part of the population, and especially young people, began to admire Ukrainian music, which became part of their lives.

Chervona Ruta also launched a national show business in Ukraine. It was Ruta who became the first customer for the technical (stage, sound, light, recording studios, music equipment, reproduction of music production) and creative (composers, arrangers, sound producers, poets, etc.) support such events. During the first Ruta Fest the festival records were sold out and did not satisfy even a tenth of the demand. And after the festival was held the first ever Ukrainian concert tour: 87 concerts of the winners of "Ruth-89" all over Ukraine were held with unprecedented success in crowded halls. The music of the festival began to gather huge audiences in the hundreds of thousands of spectators at the stadiums and large squares attracted by the artistic value of the concerts (previously, so many people only gathered for political rallies).

In honor of the 1989 Chervona Ruta Festival, which played an important role in the development of modern Ukrainian popular music, the Verkhovna Rada of Ukraine established Ukrainian Music Day in 2026.

== See also ==
- List of music festivals in Ukraine
- Volodymyr Ivasyuk
- Jurmala Young Pop Singer Competition
- Singing Revolution
