= Vitali Alekseenok =

Belarusian conductor, musician

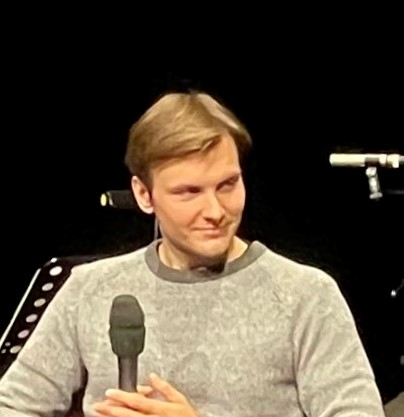
- Born: 4 January 1991 (age 35); Vileyka, Belarus
- Occupation: Conductor
- Style: Classical music
- Website: Official website

Vitali Alekseenok (Belarusian: Віталь Алексяёнак; born 4 January 1991) is a Belarusian conductor and musician. Artistic director of the Kharkiv Music Fest and since the 2024/25 season Сhief Conductor at the Deutsche Oper am Rhein, after serving as 1st Kapellmeisterand Deputy GMD.

== Biography ==
Alekseenok was born in Vileyka, Minsk region, Belarus.

In 2016, Alekseenok graduated from the Saint Petersburg Conservatory (Prof. Alexander Alexeev), then moved to Germany and completed his master's degree at the Weimar School of Music (Prof. Nicolás Pasquet, Gunter Kahlert and Ekhart Wycik). During his studies he took part in various master classes, in particular by Bernard Haitink, Fabio Luisi among others.

In 2021, he won the Arturo Toscanini Conducting Competition in Parma. In addition to the first prize, he also received the Audience Award and the prize for the best performance of a Verdi opera.

In June 2021, Alekseenok became artistic director of the Ukrainian Kharkiv Music Festival, which organizes concerts in bomb shelters, subways and hospitals in Kharkiv during the Russo-Ukrainian War.

As an opera conductor he has collaborated with the Teatro alla Scala (Milan), the Bavarian State Opera (Munich), the National Opera of Ukraine (Kyiv), the Gran Teatre del Liceu (Barcelona), the Sofia Philharmonic, the Teatro Massimo Bellini (Catania) and others. He has conducted orchestras such as the MDR Symphony Orchestra, the Staatskapelle Weimar, the Orchestra del Teatro Comunale di Bologna, the Filarmonica Arturo Toscanini in Parma and the Kyiv Symphony Orchestra, among others. Alekseenok also led the first Ukrainian performance of Wagner's Tristan und Isolde at the National Opera of Ukraine in autumn 2021 and conducted a production of Mozart's opera Don Giovanni in Severodonetsk in 2018 as part of the project "Music Overcomes Walls"

== Social engagement ==
In addition to Alekseenok's occupation as a conductor, he is also a writer. In 2021 his book Die weißen Tage von Minsk: Unser Traum von einem freien Belarus was published by S. Fischer Verlag, as well as many articles and essays for Der Tagesspiegel, Neue Rundschau, Religion & Gesellschaft Zürich, among others.

He has given lectures at LMU Munich and Humboldt University of Berlin. Alekseenok has also created numerous educational projects in Western and Eastern Europe and led youth orchestras in Germany, Italy, Poland and Ukraine.
