= The Telnyuk Sisters =

Ukrainian musical duo

The Telnyuk Sisters ТЕЛЬНЮК: Сестри
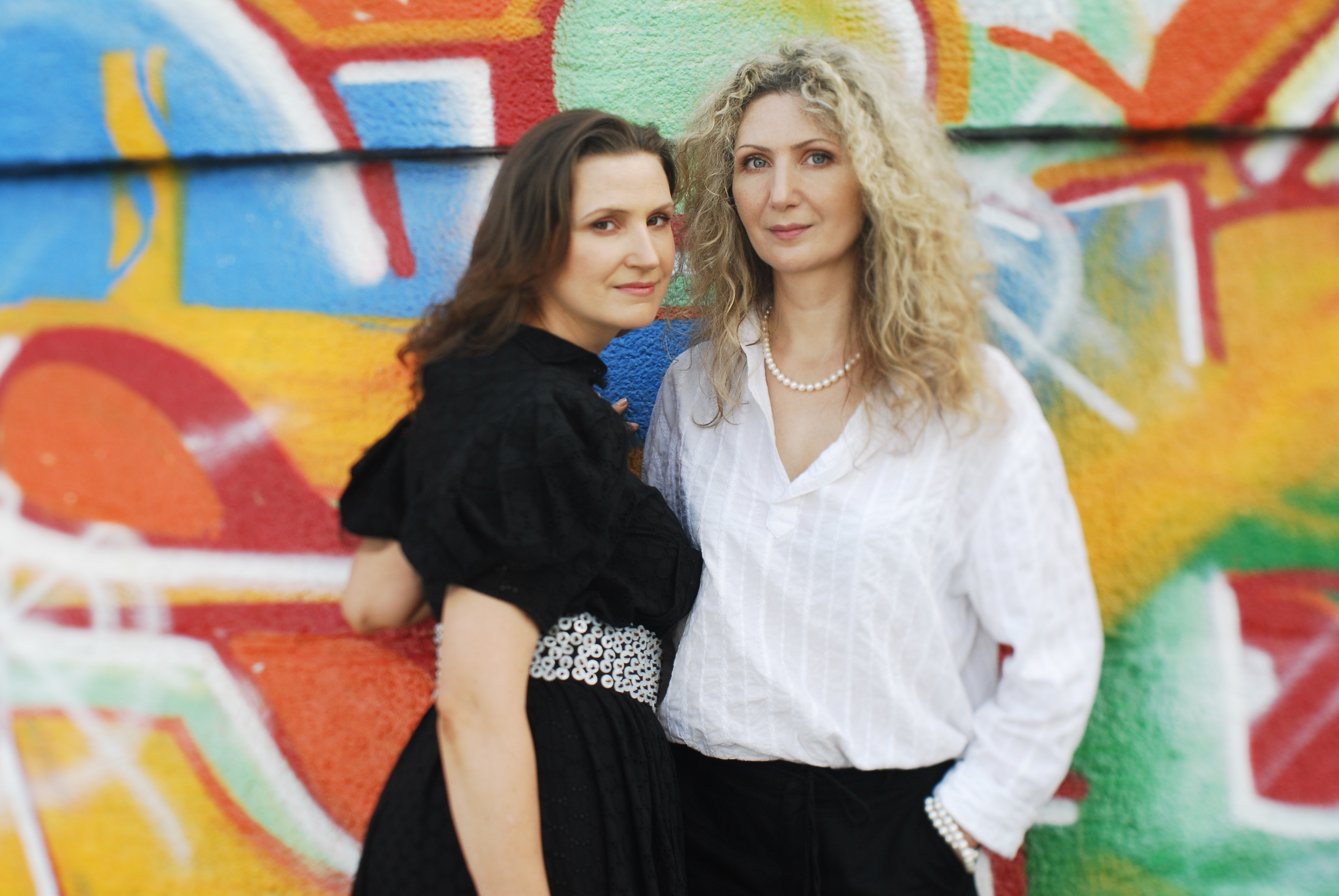
- ТЕЛЬНЮК: Сестри - The Telnyuk Sisters

Background information
- Origin: Kyiv, Ukraine
- Genres: Rock, Art Rock, Crossover
- Years active: 1986–present
- Labels: COMP music / EMI; KOMORA
- Members: Lesya Telnyuk; Halya Telnyuk; Sviatoslav Borovyk; Igor Patsovskyi; Maksym Rymar
- Website: http://www.telnyuk.info

The Telnyuk Sisters (Ukrainian: ТЕЛЬНЮК: Сестри) are a Ukrainian vocal duo composed of Lesya and Halya Telnyuk. They were awarded the Vasyl Stus Prize for the preservation and promotion of the Ukrainian culture. They have also been awarded the People's Artist of Ukraine prize.

== Early life ==
Ukrainians Lesya and Halya Telnyuk began composing at the age of 13. They created rock ballads, elegies, and songs for choral performances based on the verses of classic Ukrainian poets. They began their first serious attempt at arranging their own songs with composer Alexander Melnyk. They then began their professional music career in the year 1986.

== Career timeline ==
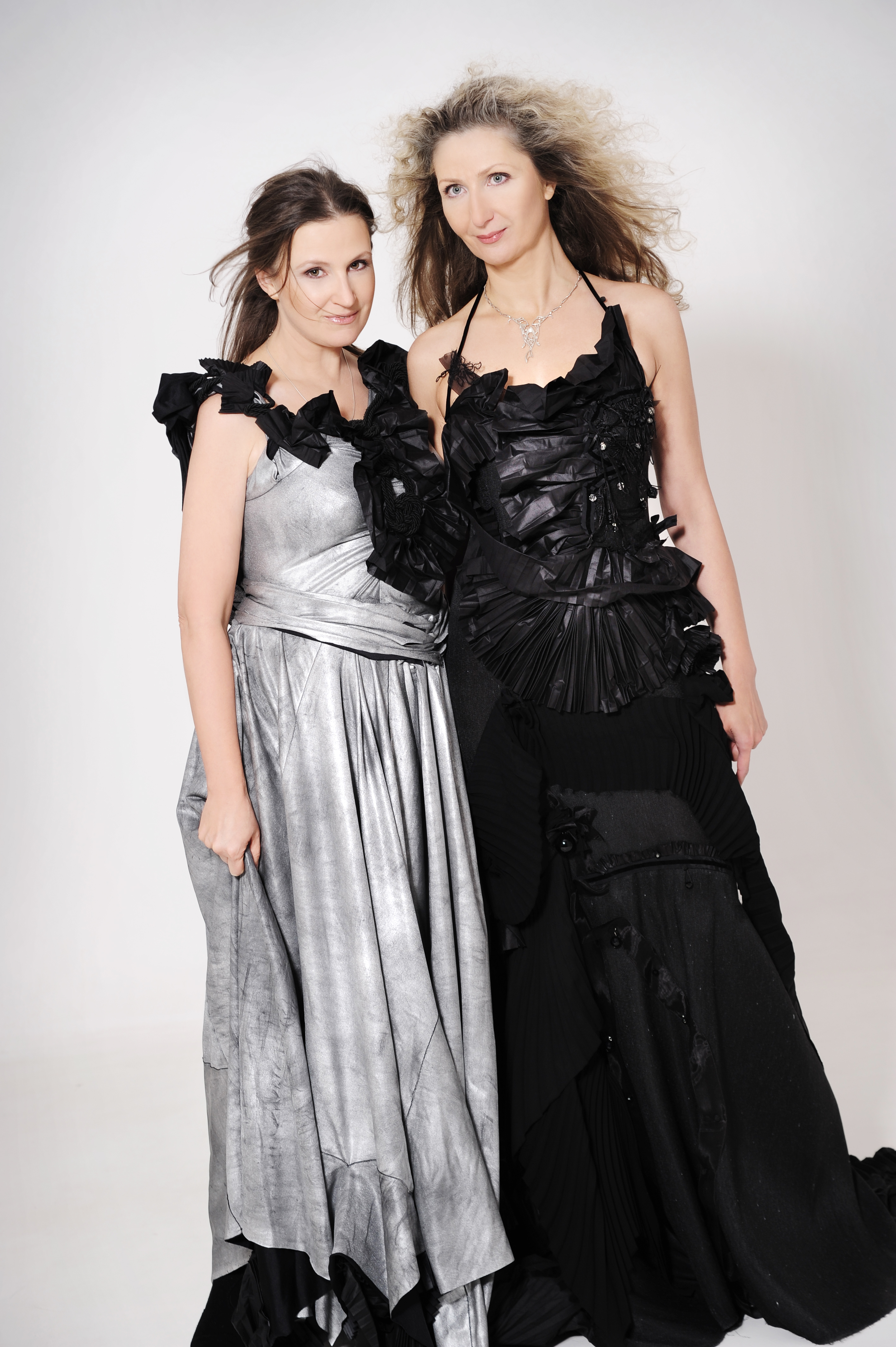
Halya (left) and Lesya (right) Telnyuk in 2009

In 1987, one year after their debut, the sisters became the laureates of the national competition "New Names". They won multiple awards at the first and second "Chervona Ruta" festivals in 1989 and 1991 with songs based on the verse of Pavlo Tychyna.

In the early 1990s, the sisters released the albums Moment and Lesya and Halya, in collaboration with composer Andryj Shust ("Falcon"). They then adopted a new sound in collaboration with pianist and composer Ivan Davydenko ("Take offence", "Under the Rain", "Ophelia", "Next to You") and later with Eugene Bortnychuk, Oleg Putyatin, and Igor Sereda, leading to the album "Silence and Thunder."

In 1997, the Sisters, along with ex-Rolling Stones guitarist Mick Taylor, recorded the track "My Futile Love". On the 60th anniversary of the birth of the Ukrainian poet Vasyl Stus, the programme "Swinging evening broken even ..." was created. It was a series of performances by Raisa Nedashkivska in cooperation with the son of the poet Dmytro Stus and actress Halyna Stefanova, as well as composer Sergyi Moroz. The programme "On the Edge", which was dedicated in memory of the poet, was seen and heard by Canadian students.

In 1998, the group was awarded the Vasyl Stus Prize for the preservation and promotion of Ukrainian culture. In the early 2000s, the Telnyuks began to dabble in the theatre when the controversial play UBN (Ukrainian Bourgeois Nationalist) was staged in Lviv Drama Zankovetska Theatre, led by Fyodor Nikolayevich Strigun and directed by Myroslav Hrynyshyn. Halyna Telnyuk was credited with screenwriting while the composer of the music was Lesya Telnyuk. The original version of UBN is played at Lutsk Drama Theater.

For many years, the Sisters worked with Nina Morozevich, a teacher in Bandura at Odesa State Conservatory and leader of trio Mallows at Odesa State Philharmonic. Together they collaborated on several tracks.

In Canada, the Telnyuk Sisters became acquainted with the Canadian artist Igor Polishchuk and within a few years, they released "Above Us The Sky", a fusion of music, poetry, and painting. This multimedia show also consisted of pictures, songs, and videos that played in ten cities in North America. The Star wrote that the tour's "music and performances break down language barriers".

The duo participated in joint projects such as Ukrainian Lullabies, Kruty: Concert for the Angels, Festival in Montreal. Live Voice of Vasyl Stus, and Kobzar.

The sisters worked with Dmitro Stus and Roman Semysal on 2008 project Stusove Circle, about Vasyl Stus. Then in December of the same year, they performed on the Komu Vnyz concert tour. The program "Wind of Centuries" was seen and heard in Odesa, Kherson, Krivyj Rig, Kirovograd, Sumy, Kharkiv, and Dnipropetrovsk.

In 2009, the Sisters participated in Antonych Fest, the centenary celebration of the birth of B.-I. Antonych held by artists and youth organisations. In addition to performances on the concert stage festival on October 7, they presented a CD titled Forever: Bohdan-Ihor Antonych, with five interpretative songs on Antonych's poetry, and Ukrainian and French language tracks written with bands Dead Rooster, AbыMS and Olexandr Melnyk.

In 2010, their film Telnyuk: Rehearsal premiered. It consisted of rehearsal recordings and was the first in Ukraine by director Alexander Antennae in the concert program of the Sisters' Yellow Dandelion. The sisters also released their album SONMO. In the spring they toured several cities around Ukraine, concluding with a concert at the Kyiv Operetta which was attended by President Viktor Yushchenko.

The Sisters have also created a number of sketches of songs based on poems by Oksana Zabuzhko.

== Discography ==
=== Albums ===
- 1991 – "Myt`" (Мить)
- 1994 – "Halya i Lesya" (Галя і Леся)
- 1998 – "Tysha i Hrim" (Тиша і Грім)
- 2000 – "Live in Canada"
- 2001 – "U.B.N.: pisni z vystavy" (У.Б.Н.: пісні з вистави)
- 2003 – "Zhar-ptytsi" (Жар-приці)
- 2005 – "Vybrane 1CD" (Вибране 1CD)
- 2005 – "Vybrane 2CD" (Вибране 2CD)
- 2007 – "Zhovta Kulbaba" (Жовта кульбаба)
- 2008 – "Telnyuk: Nazavzhdy" (Тельнюк: Назавжди)
- 2009 – "Telnyuk: Live" (Тельнюк: Live)
- 2010 – "Telnyuk: Rehearsal" (Тельнюк: Rehearsal)
- 2010 – "SONMO" (СОНМО)
- 2010 – "Moje sertse v Verchovyni" (Моє серце в Верховині)
- 2011 – "Incrustatsiji:pisni z vystavy" (Інкрустації: пісні з вистави)
- 2011 – "Doroha zi skla" (Дорога зі скла)
- 2011 – "X Y Z"
