= Ukrainian Music Day =

Commemorative day in Ukraine

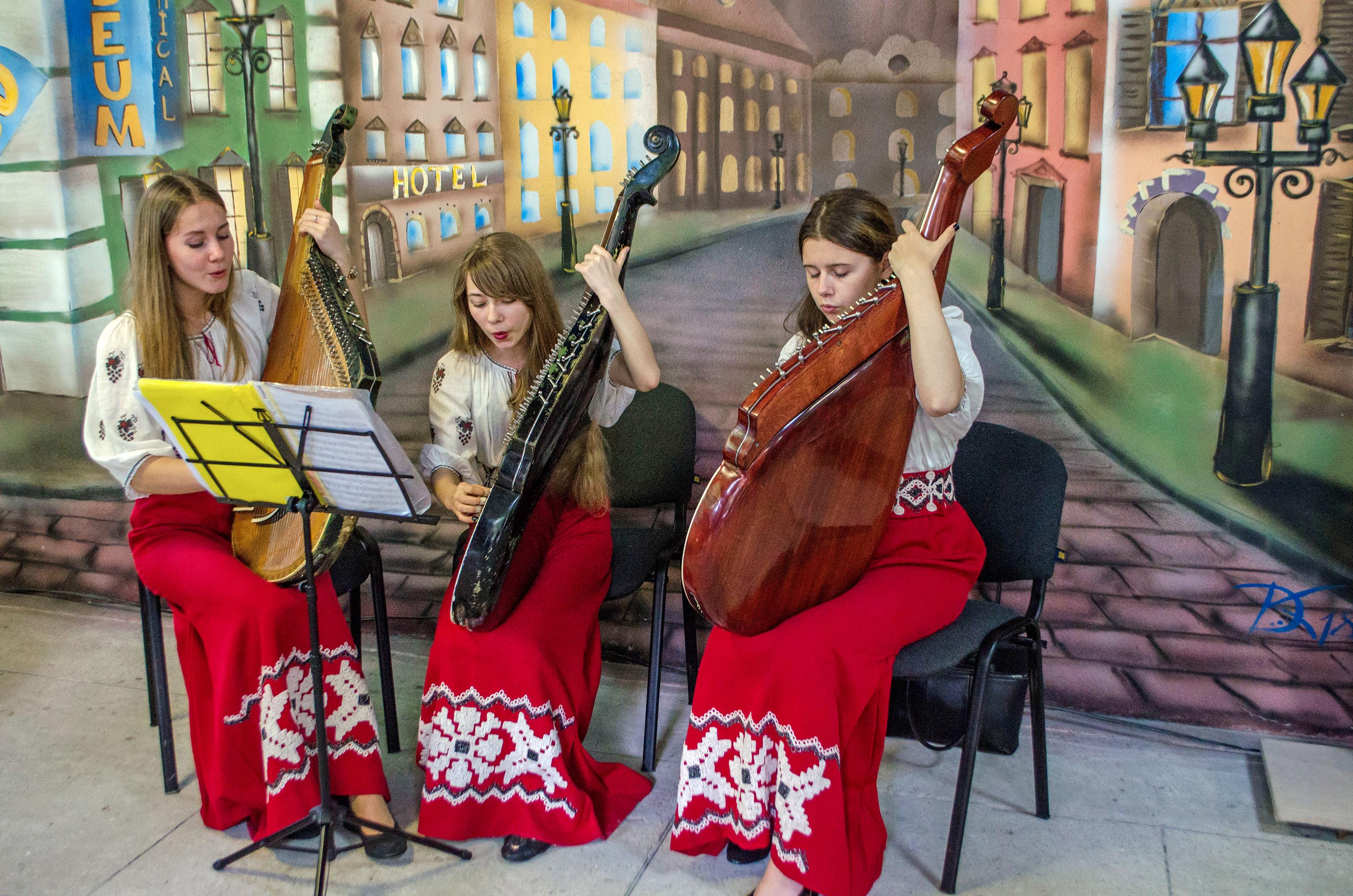
- A trio of bandura performers. The bandura is one of the symbols of Ukrainian musical culture.
- Observed by: Ukraine
- Type: National
- Significance: Celebration of Ukrainian music and musical heritage
- Date: Third Saturday of September
- Frequency: annual
- Related to: Music of Ukraine

Ukrainian Music Day (Ukrainian: День української музики, romanized: Den’ ukrayins’koyi muzyky) is a national commemorative day in Ukraine observed annually on the third Saturday of September. It was established by the Verkhovna Rada on 27 May 2026 to honor Ukrainian musical heritage, composers, performers, and the contemporary music industry.

== History ==
The initiative to establish Ukrainian Music Day was proposed by representatives of Ukraine's music sector, including organizations involved in copyright and neighbouring rights management. The date was chosen in reference to the first Chervona Ruta festival, held in September 1989, which played an important role in the development of contemporary Ukrainian music. On 27 May 2026, the Verkhovna Rada adopted Resolution No. 4884‑IX "On the establishment of Ukrainian Music Day", establishing it as an annual observance on the third Saturday of September.

== Purpose ==
The commemorative day aims to recognize the contribution of Ukrainian composers, performers, musicians, and music industry professionals to Ukrainian culture and identity.

== See also ==
- International Music Day
- Fête de la Musique
- Music of Ukraine
- Chervona Ruta (festival)
- Make Music Day UK
