= Kharkiv Music Festival =

- Genre: Classical
- Dates: April–May
- Locations: Kharkiv, Ukraine
- Years active: 2018–present
- Website: kharkivmusicfest.com

Kharkiv Music Festival (Ukrainian: Харків Музік Фест) is an annual international Festival of classical music that has been taking place in Kharkiv, Ukraine, since 2018. The festival includes not only a concert programme, but also an educational programme and activities to promote classical music. Festival events take place both in the concert halls of the Kharkiv Philharmonic Society and Kharkiv State Academic Opera and Ballet Theatre named after Mykola Lysenko, as well as in unconventional locations such as the subway, shopping malls, art spaces, and open-air venues. Some of the festival events are free of charge and have free admission.

Co-founders of the Festival: Serhii Polituchyi, Stanislav Khristenko, Ihor Tuluzov.

The organizer of the Festival: Charity Community Foundation of Kharkiv “TOLOKA”

The artistic director of the festival is Vitali Alekseenok.

== History ==
Kharkiv Music Fest was founded in 2018. Stanislav Khristenko was the first artistic director of the Festival and held this position for a three-year term.

=== In 2018 ===
In 2018, the Festival was dedicated to the 333rd birth anniversary of Johann Sebastian Bach. The Festival period lasted from 14 to 29 March. Launched in 2018, the Art Piano project (painted pianos installed in different locations around the city) and the Festival Orchestra became one of the bright Festival's hallmarks.

=== In 2019 ===
In 2019, Wolfgang Amadeus Mozart was chosen as the “headliner” of Kharkiv Music Festival. The Festival was held from 23 March to 7 April, and it significantly expanded the geography of its participants; in 2019 the Festival Orchestra was consisted of leading musicians from Ukraine and invited foreign guest-musicians. The Festival was rewarded with the EFFE Label 2019-2020 by the European Festivals Association.

=== In 2020 ===
In 2020, the Festival was scheduled for 28 March - 11 April, but the lockdown restrictions related to the coronavirus pandemic resulted in the cancellation of all events.

=== In 2021 ===
In 2021, the Festival was dedicated to the 250th anniversary of the birth of Ludwig van Beethoven. The festival activities consisted of 22 concerts and 11 educational events, as well as 9 special projects, some of which took place online.

=== In 2022 ===
In 2022, the Festival was expected to include concerts by Lucas Debargue, Nils Wanderer and others, but due to the Russian invasion of Ukraine (2022–present), the festival events were narrowed down to a symbolic "Concert between explosions", which took place in the Kharkiv subway, which became a shelter for thousands of citizens.

=== Participants ===
Over the years, the festival's participants have included national and international stars of classical music, such as composer and conductor Myroslav Skoryk, conductor Tomasz Bugaj, Paul Lewis (pianist) and George Li, the duo Igudesman & Joo, Les Musiciens du Louvre, cellist Gautier Capuçon, vocalist Olga Busuioc, and others.

== Festival initiatives ==
=== Kharkiv Music Festival Orchestra ===
The Festival Orchestra is a symphony orchestra that has been an annual part of the Kharkiv Music Festival since 2018. Over the years, musicians from the world's leading orchestras, such as the Lucerne Festival Orchestra, BBC Symphony Orchestra, Czech Philharmonic Orchestra, Royal Stockholm Philharmonic Orchestra, Belgian National Orchestra, Slovak Philharmonic Orchestra, Georgian Philharmonic Orchestra and others, have joined the orchestra.

Some of the orchestra's members are also concert soloists and members of chamber ensembles performing at many prestigious venues around the world.

Throughout the years, the Festival Orchestra has featured such soloists as Vaclav Dvořák, Agata Šymčevska, Volodymyr Mykytka, Till Hoffman, Myroslava Kotorovych, under the direction of such conductors as Fakhraddin Kerimov, Ivan Cherednychenko, Stanislav Khristenko and others.

=== Young composers competition ===
All-Ukrainian Young Composers Competition named after Borys Lyatoshynsky was established in 2019 as part of the Kharkiv Music Festival. It aims to develop the creativity of Ukrainian young composers, increase the importance of their works, and provide professional guidance to young artists in a professional environment. The competition is held annually. The winners' works are performed by professional musicians and soloists at the Call for genius concert, which includes an award ceremony.

=== Kharkiv Music Festival Children's Symphony Orchestra ===
The Kharkiv Music Festival Children's Symphony Orchestra was established in 2019. The orchestra brings together about 50 students of Kharkiv's music education institutions and gives them the opportunity to gain professional experience in orchestral musicianship at a young age, regularly improve their performing arts throughout the year under the guidance of the orchestra's conductor and experienced teachers, learn about classical music masterpieces, and perform at concert venues in Kharkiv and other cities and countries.

Over the three years of the orchestra's existence, the young orchestral players have worked with conductors from Ukraine (Vitalii Lyashko, Nataliia Stets, Nazar Yakobenchuk, Yuriy Yakovenko), Germany (Vitali Alekseenok) and the USA (Stanislav Khristenko).

== Art Piano ==
Art Piano is an ongoing project that promotes musical art. Painted pianos placed in popular locations among the locals are one of the festival's trademarks. Both recognised artists and students of Kharkiv art schools and students are involved in transforming them into art objects. Spontaneous concerts are held near the piano, and anyone can play it.
