= Folknery =

Ukrainian free folk band

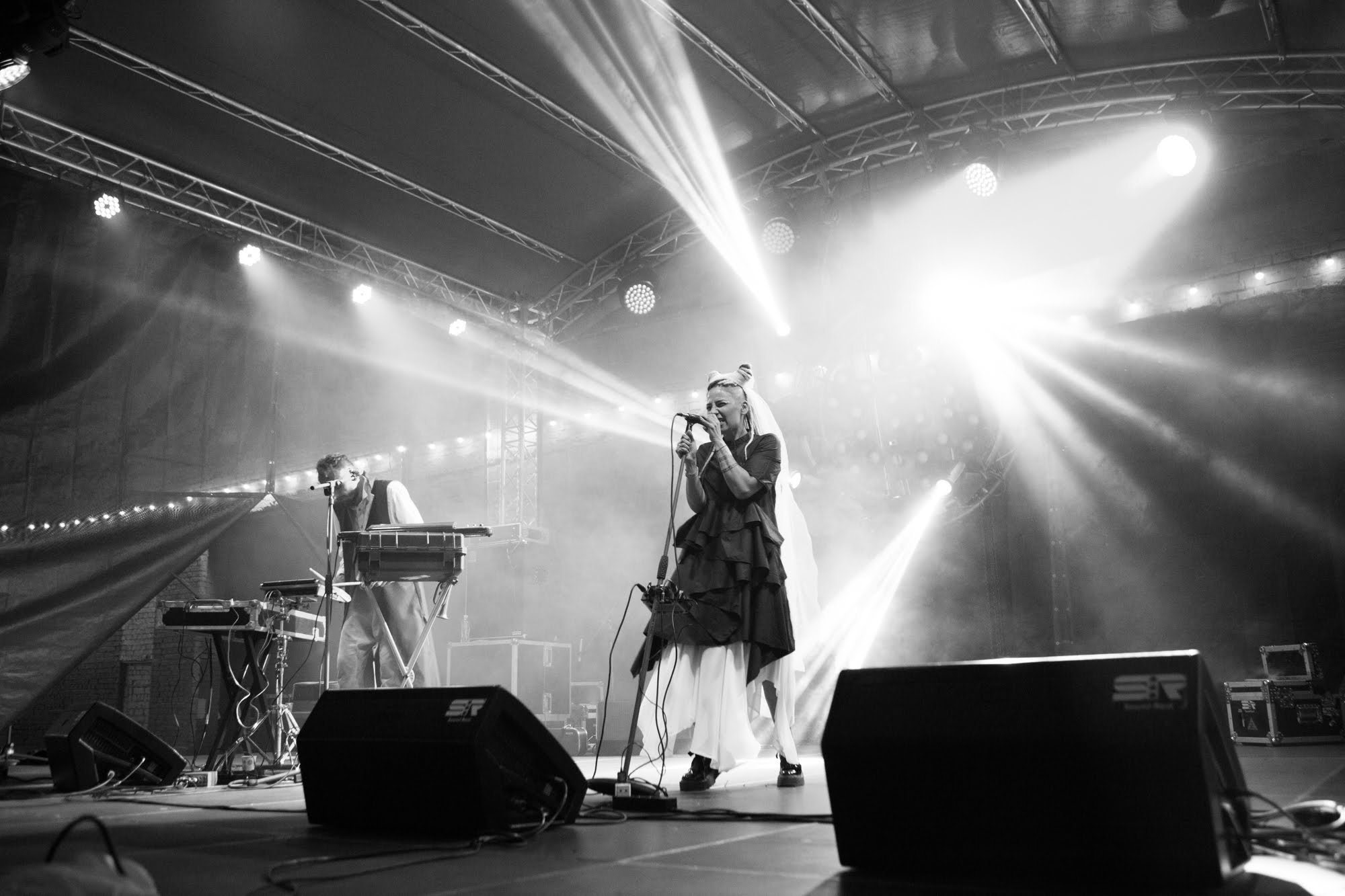
- Folknery performing in 2019

Background information
- Origin: Kyiv, Ukraine
- Genres: dark folk, folk music, world music
- Years active: 2009–present
- Members: Volodymyr Muliar; Yaryna Kvitka
- Past members: Yulia Sovershenna; Ostap Danyliv; Roman Sharkevych; Iryna Viryasova; Dmytro Sorokin

Folknery (Ukrainian: Фолькнери) is a Ukrainian free folk band, founded in 2009 by Volodymyr Muliar and Yaryna Kvitka. The duo travels around Ukraine and other countries by bicycle, gathering traditional folk songs and recording them with additional musical elements.

== Reception ==
Lee Blackstone of RootsWorld describes Folknery's debut album Useful Things as "providing surprises from one track to the next. Ukrainian music is the foundation, but in true post-modern style, it is not the focus so much as what the other musical elements bring as commentary to the tunes." Folknery's second album, Son was also well received.

The group has received multiple festival awards for their performances. In particular, in 2011 Folknery became the best ethnic band at the International festival-contest "Mikołajki Folkowe" (Lublin, Poland). Besides the 1st prize, band also won the "Audience Award".

== Origin of the band name ==
The name Folknery comes from the name of both the American writer William Faulkner and the term "folklore". According to Volodymyr Muliar, during the cycling trip to Abkhazia in 2009, while trying to decide on a band name, Sir William Faulkner came in his dreams proposing to use his last name as a basis for it. Coincidentally, it was consonant with the term "folklore", the subject of the band's activity.

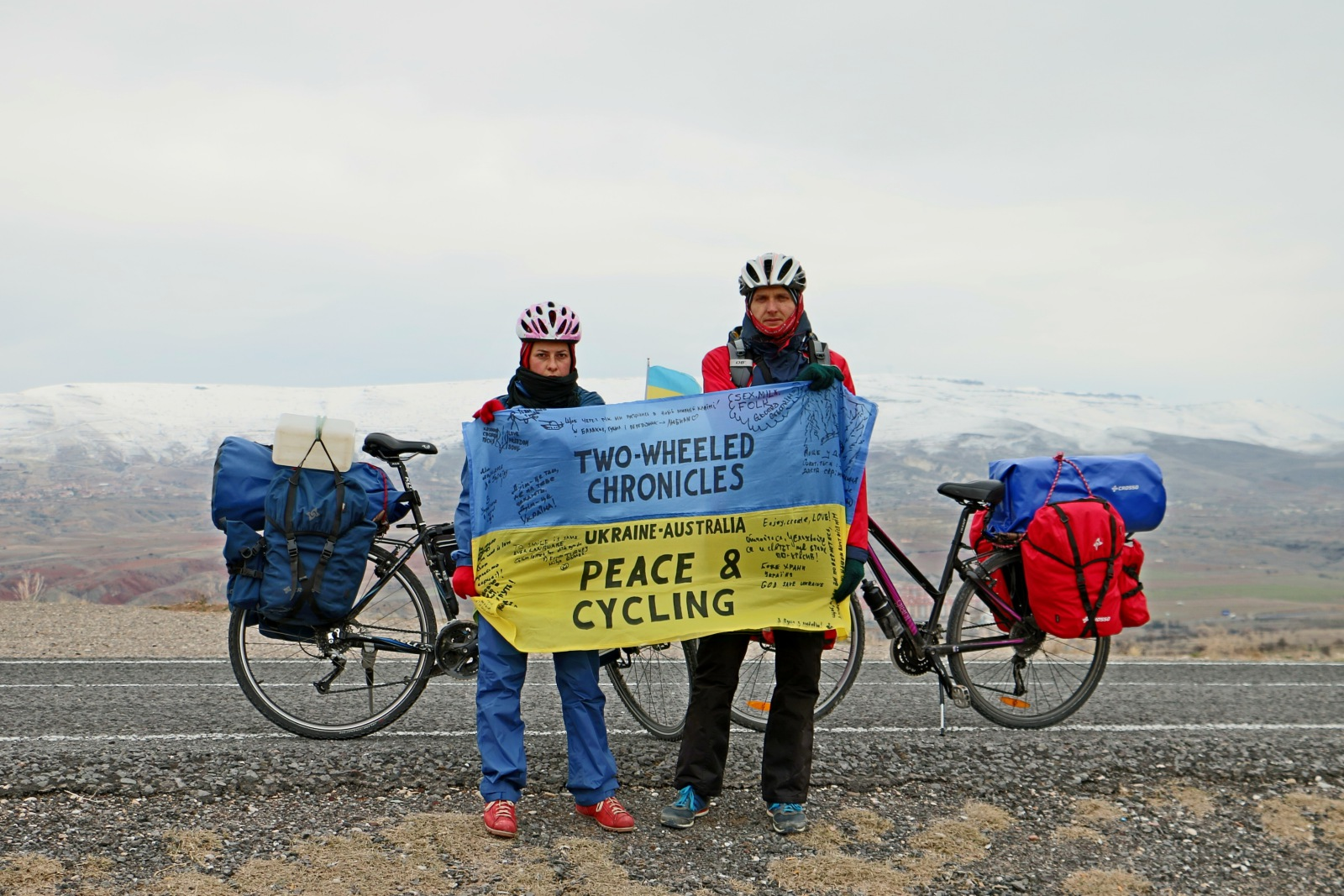

== Folknery's project "Two-wheeled Chronicles" ==
In 2010, Volodymyr Muliar and Yaryna Kvitka launched a cultural project called Two-Wheeled Chronicles. Its primary aim was to popularize Ukrainian culture, look for folk songs and promote green, cycling tourism. Every year, as part of the project, they took their bicycles and set off on a major ethnographic expedition through rural parts of various countries. They look for people who love singing to collect and record less known folklore. Some of the ‘found’ songs Folknery later include in their own repertoire.

In 2014, the duo embarked on a global bicycling trip that inspired their two-volume Two-Wheeled Chronicles, which came to an abrupt end with the emergency birth of their son Marko in Australia. However, after some time, the family of three resumed cycling, going to Southeast Asia. Since then, the project "Two-wheeled Chronicles" has gained popularity in Ukraine. Up to now Volodymyr, Yaryna and Marko have cycled over 60,000 km in various countries in Asia, Europe, Africa, Australia and South America. They create numerous videos about their travels on YouTube channel, which are also rebroadcast by several Ukrainian TV channels.

== Discography ==
- Useful Things (2013)
- Son (2018)
- Two-Wheeled Chronicles, Volume 1 (2018)
- Two-Wheeled Chronicles, Volume 2 (2020)
- Hungry Shadows (Original Game Soundtrack) (2020)
