= Humorina =

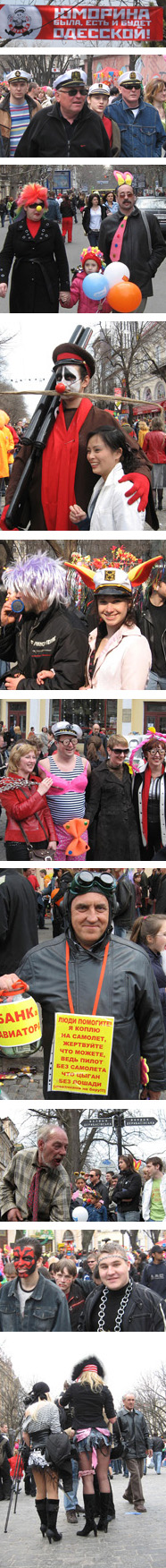
Humorina-2007

Humorina (Ukrainian: Гуморина, romanized: Humoryna, Russian: Юморина, romanized: Yumorina) is an annual festival of humor held in Odesa, Ukraine, on and around April Fools' Day (1 April) since 1973. The festival is marked by a large parade in the city center, performances by musicians, comedians, clowns and a large number of fun-dressed people on the streets. These days April Fools' Days' pranks are spread by people and local mass media.

== History ==
It was created in 1972 by the Odesa KVN team after the all-Union KVN contests and the corresponding TV show were discontinued. Young members of the team in protest decided to come up with a special festival of laughter. The name arose by analogy with the Kinomarina (English: Filmarina) film festival taking place at that time, and so the name appeared – Humorina. Such a pun was characteristic of the satirical performances of comedians on the KVN TV show.

The festival became so popular that more and more people gathered for it every year. Frightened by a huge, self-organizing crowd, the city authorities banned the celebration of Laughter Day.

The name "Humorina" was proposed by Oleg Stashkevich – one of the founders and a member of the Odesa KVN team.

The first slogan of Humorina was "Odesans of all countries – unite!", a paraphrase of the famous slogan of the communists: "Workers of the world – unite!"

== Today ==
Today the Humorina includes a lot of city events celebrating April Fools' Day. In Soviet times, the main driving force of the festival was the Odesa KVN team. In the early 1990s, the World Club of Odesa and its president Mikhail Zhvanetsky initiated the return of the festival. Now this has changed and comic troupe the "Masks" have taken the baton.

The "Masks" was a well known TV show in the 1990s. Later they organized their own theater, House of Clowns, which still continues in Odesa. Today these people are leaders and the main power of the festival and April Fools' Day humoristic events. The "Masks" organized a separate festival, Comediada, that starts four days before 1 April. Since 2010 with the celebration of April Fools' Day the International Festival of Clowns and Mimes has taken place in Odesa.

== Facts ==
In 2019, Humorina festival was dedicated to the centenary of the Odesa Film Studio. At traditional parade in the city center, one of the platforms presented the famous Soviet film D'Artagnan and Three Musketeers by Georgi Yungvald-Khilkevich and showed original costumes from the movie.

Since the first run for mayor of the city, a candidate from the Internet party of Ukraine, the regular participants in the traditional city procession, became Darth Vader and the imperial stormtroopers from the movie Star Wars.
