= Mazepa-Fest =

- Genre: Ethno-rock, rock, folk, alternative
- Locations: Spivoche Pole named after Marusia Churai, Peremoha Park, Poltava, Ukraine
- Years active: 2003–present

Mazepa-Fest (Ukrainian: «Мазепа-Фест») is an annual all-Ukrainian ethno-rock music and arts festival held in the city of Poltava, Ukraine. It takes place at Spivoche Pole (Singing Field) named after Marusia Churai in the Peremoha (Victory) Park. The festival was founded in 2003 by the Poltava Regional Association of the Prosvita Society, on the initiative of the society's chairman Mykola Kulchynskyi. The festival's chief director and presenter since its founding has been Serhii Arkhypchuk; musicologist Oleksandr Yevtushenko is also a member of the organising committee.

The early programmes featured exclusively Ukrainian rock bands, while in subsequent years film screenings, choral music concerts and other events were added. The festival has been cited in the academic literature as one of the key annual rock festivals that emerged in Ukraine from the 1990s onward. During its peak years the festival drew several thousand young people to Spivoche Pole. The 2016 edition was considered the weakest in the festival's history, partly owing to an artistically outdated repertoire; plans to relocate the event to the town of Kolomak were subsequently discussed. After a five-year hiatus the festival returned on 25 September (year unspecified in source), held again in Poltava under its full title All-Ukrainian Patriotic Ethno-Rock Festival of Arts "Mazepa-Fest".

== Editions ==
=== 2003 (1st edition) ===
Performers included:

- DMTs, Bavovna, Choir "Akademiia" (MAUP students), Trans-former, Arakhnofobiia, Eduard Drach, Yurii Tovstogan, Perlyna Stepu, Sad, Vasia Club, Komu Vnyz, Haidamaky, Plach Yeremii.

=== 2004 (2nd edition) ===
Performers included:

- Kruty Pedali, Bereh Bonazy, Kontrabas, Bavovna, Trutni, Online, Anderson, Dymna Sumish, Oksana Vyhovska, Lesia Horova and Yurko Tovstogan, Ocheretianyi Kit, Arakhnofobiia, Skarb, Vii, Numer 482, Perkalaba, Borshch, Mertvyi Piven, Haidamaky.

=== 2005 (3rd edition) ===
Performers included:

- Foma (Mandry), Komu Vnyz, Taras Petрynenko, Komakha, Mariia Khmilyova, Faino, Vikno, Voanerges, Hutsul Kalipso, Boombox, Dyvni Dity, Faktychno Sami, Tsarstvo Nebesne, Korolivski Zaitsi, Taras Kompanichenko, Olha Bohomoltsʹ, Oleksandr Smyka, TOL, Talisman, Karna, Orkestr Yanky Kozyr, Oneiroid, Katastrofa, Smur, Ot Vinta, Trans-former, Arakhnofobiia, Bereh Bonazy, Pins, Bavovna, DeltaTora, Nezvychainyi Takotozh, Kutsa Lava.

Film screenings: Molytva za Hetmana Mazepu (Prayer for Hetman Mazepa), Poliski Obrazky, Z Naikrashchymy Pobazhanniamy. Enver.

Kobzar Day: Lirнyk Sashko, Volodymyr Yesypok, Father and Son Sylenko, Lirнyk Yarema, Eduard Drach, Taras Kompanichenko, Ihor Zhuk, Vasyl Zhdankin, Sokoliky, Ternova Ruzha, Lyubava, Vyshyvanka, Khoreya Kozatska, Yurii Fedynskyi, Serhii Okhrimchuk, Kolodii, Vertep, Kontrabas, DeltaTora, Nova Zemlia, Tin Sontsia, Mandarynovy Rai, Karpatiany and others.

=== 2006 (4th edition) ===
Main concert performers (44 bands) included:

- E-42, O.Torvald, Chill Out, Talisman, Pins, Linky, Oneiroid, P@P@ Karlo, Abzdolts, Faino, DMTs, Khorta, Shyroko Zakriti Ochi, Bez Obmezhen, Trans-former, Arakhnofobiia, Kvadradzhezyma, W.H.I.T.E.

Film screenings: Vidkryta Nich, Krynytsia dlia Sprahlykh, Syomyi Marshrut, Mamay, Kaminnyi Khrest.

Kobzar and bard song: Taras Kompanichenko, Yurii Fedynskyi, Eduard Drach, Oleksandr "Sound" Muzyka, Ihor Vyshniakov.

=== 2007 (5th edition) ===
Over 44 bands performed, including:

- Ot Vinta, Orkestr Yanky Kozyr, Haidamaky, Komu Vnyz, Perkalaba, Kholodne Sontse, Vurdalaky, Trans-former, Tsarstvo Nebesne, DeltaTora, DMTs, Arakhnofobiia, Kontrabas, Korolivski Zaitsi, Ruteniia, Horghisheli, Kaliektsiia, P@P@ Karlo, Khoreya Kozatska, Foma (Mandry), Sontsekliosh, Dzha i Ra, Da Bit, Maizhe Kolir, TiK, AtmAsfera.

Film screenings: Bohdan Khmelnytskyi, Vladyka Andrei, Povstannia Dukhu.

Folk and ethnic music evening: Ostap Stakhiv, Burdon, Bozbychi, Volodymyr Smotryteli, Prokopchuk Family Band, Narodnyi Kolektyv Drevo.

Rock Day: Pikkardiyska Tertsiia, Sestry Telniuk, Vytivky, Bandura Bend, Choboty Buhaia, DrymbaDADzyha, Pasito, Kimnata Hretchen, Inula, Trans-former, Vechirnii Doshch, Stereometriia, Oneiroid, Diora, De Shifer, Flit, Platyna, Vii, Rolliks, Stepan Chumak, Dzhapre, Brem Stoker, Krab, Efekt Metelyka, 9 Kalibr, DMTs, Arakhnofobiia, Sestra Kerry, Kids Room 402, Ochi Bezodni, Tartak.

=== 2008 (6th edition) ===
Held 5 June 2008 (opening) at Spivoche Pole, Poltava.

Performers included:

- Kids Room 402, Great Crunch, Sestra Kerry, Nove Pokolinnia, Animato, Etsetera, Kontrabas, HALiaK, P@P@ Karlo, Mureny, Tenore Belkanto, Oneiroid, Dniprogres, Trans-Former, Dazzle Dreams, DeltaTora, Talisman, Khatka Pta..., DrymbaDADzyha, DMTs, Arakhnofobiia, Postsense, Frezi Grand, Maior Pronin, Hapochka, Propala Hramota, Koralli, Voanerges, Merva, Khutki Smovzh, Hudimov, S.K.A.Y.

=== 2009 (7th edition) ===
Performers included Hapochka, SKAY, Hudimov and others.

=== 2010 (8th edition) ===
Held 17–19 July 2010 at Spivoche Pole named after Marusia Churai in Peremoha Park, Poltava, with free admission across three evenings of concerts beginning at approximately 17:00 each day. Over 25 bands from across Ukraine performed. A notable aspect of the 2010 edition was that the majority of performers were young, previously unfeatured acts — a deliberate experiment by the organisers to open the festival to fresh talent, though this decision drew mixed reactions from regular attendees who had come expecting established names. Attendance on the third day (19 July) was notably lower owing to an intense heat wave. The festival received state funding of 220,000 hryvnias allocated under former President Viktor Yushchenko, and a complementary evening stage was hosted at rock café Villa Krokodyla each day, also free of charge.

Day 1 (17 July): Vivienne Mort (Kyiv, art-rock), Unaby (Zaporizhzhia, ska/funk-rock), People Plant (Kyiv, alternative), Rekosta (rock), Psychotron (Kremenchuk, rock), Frosted (Kyiv, rock), Hra v Temnu (Mykolaiv, rock), Kids Room 402 (pop-rock), Sur Band (Kyiv, rock), TheLen' (Kyiv, hip-hop/rock), Maniia (pop-rock), Horghisheli (Lviv, rock), O.Torvald (Poltava–Kyiv, alternative rock), Mariia Burmaka (ethno/folk-rock, headliner).

Day 2 (18 July): DekaDAns (Sumy, rock), MAO Project (Poltava, ska-punk), Kviten' (Kharkiv, indie/alternative), Vpershe Chuiu (Kyiv, indie-rock), Great Crunch (Poltava, punk-rock), ILLARIA (Kyiv, folk/eastern rock), DreamWest (Kharkiv, alternative), Rosava (Kyiv, folk-rock), Rapira (Vinnytsia, rock), Fiolet (Lutsk, pop-rock), Revenko Band (Kyiv, indie/reggae-rock), NeDilia (Kyiv, alternative rock), Sestry Telniuk (Kyiv, pop-rock), Motor'rolla (Kyiv, punk-rock).

Day 3 (19 July): Predominantly Poltava and Kharkiv acts, including MAO Project; attendance fell owing to an intense heat wave.

=== 2011 (9th edition) ===
The 2011 edition was held at Spivoche Pole, Poltava. The festival continued to draw young audiences from across the region and remained an important platform for Ukrainian-language rock music. Festival director Mykola Kulchynskyi described the festival's educational mission as introducing Russian-speaking Ukrainian youth to the history of Hetman Mazepa and Ukrainian culture through music.

=== 2016 (later edition) ===
Held at Spivoche Pole, Poltava. The 2016 edition was subsequently criticised as the weakest in the festival's history, with commentators citing an artistically outdated programme; the possibility of relocating the event to the town of Kolomak was discussed but not realised.

=== Return edition (post-2021) ===
After a five-year hiatus following 2016, the festival returned with a performance on 25 September, once again in Poltava, operating under its full ceremonial title All-Ukrainian Patriotic Ethno-Rock Festival of Arts "Mazepa-Fest". Poltava cultural commentators noted that the festival had played a defining role in shaping national identity in the city for nearly two decades, countering Russian cultural narratives by creating a space celebrating Ukrainian language, history and music.

=== Later editions ===
Performers from various subsequent editions included:

- DekaDAns, Kviten, Vpershe Chuiu, Rapyra, Drim West, Fiolet, Revenko Bend, Mariia Burmaka, Sestry Telniuk, Motor'rolla, Vivienne Mort, Unabi, Smail, Frosted, Hra v Temnu, Illariia, Mii Batko Pye, Rosava, NeDialia, Horghisheli, Otorvald, Rekosta, Kids Room 402, Maniia, MAO Project, Psykhotron.

== Publication ==
The festival is referenced in the academic volume Ukrainska Muzychna Entsyklopediia (Ukrainian Music Encyclopaedia), edited by H. Skrypnyk (Kyiv: IMFE NANU, 2011, Vol. 3: L–M, p. 267).

== See also ==
- Ukrainian rock
- Poltava
