= Etnovyr =

Annual festival in Lviv, Ukraine

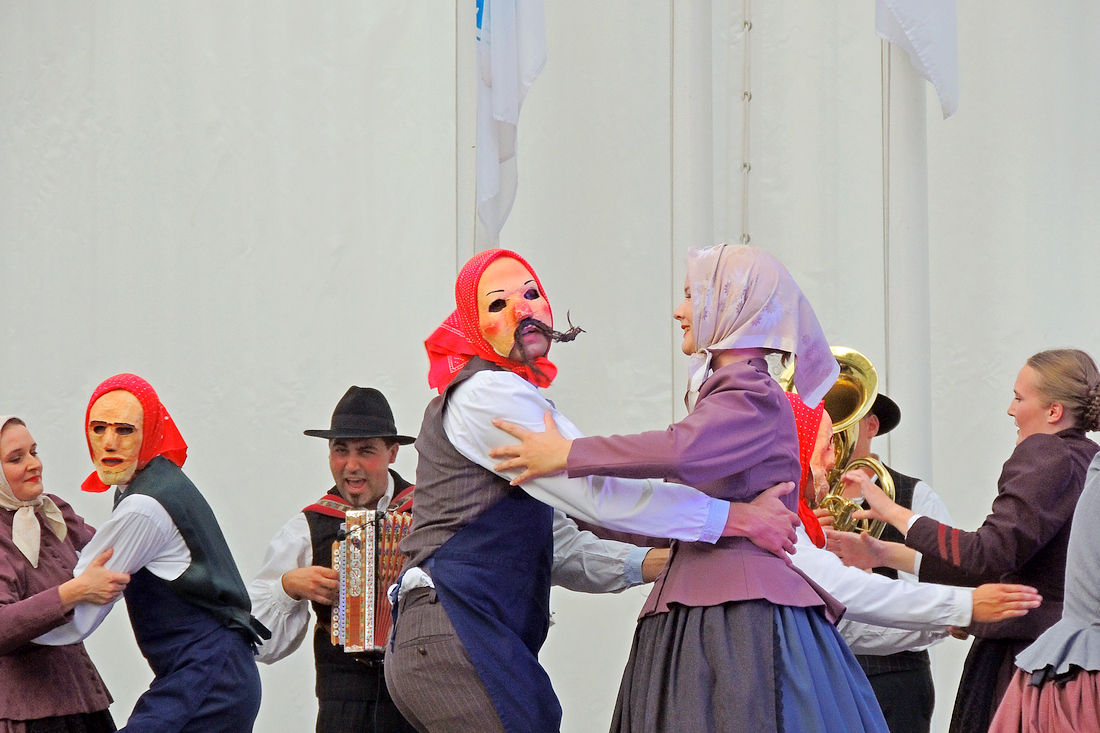
Stage Performance

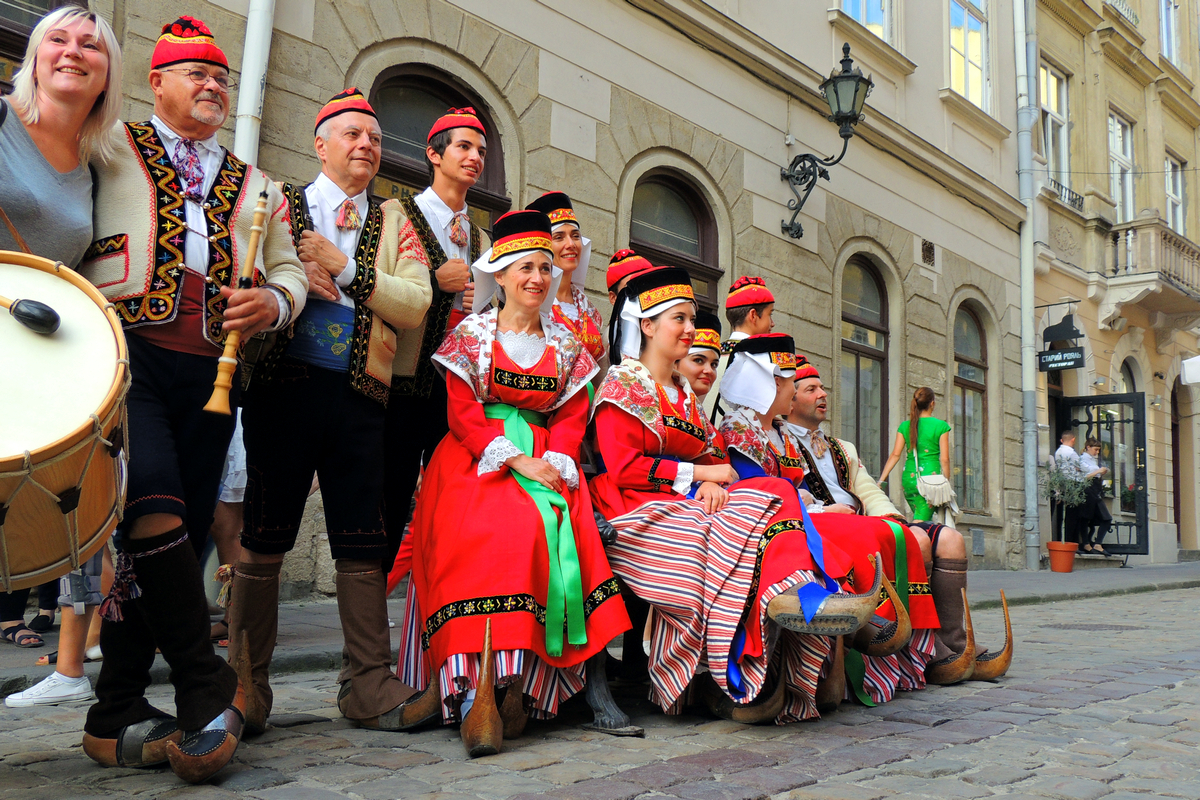
A musicians from the French folk group "Les Bethmalais" in Lviv (2019)

Etnovyr (Ukrainian: Етновир) is the annual International Folklore Festival that has taken place in Lviv on the eve of Ukraine Independence Day since 2008 under the auspices of International Council of Organizations of Folklore Festivals and Traditional Arts (CIOFF) under UNESCO and is organised by Non-governmental organization "Etnovyr" and Event Management Company. The festival takes place in downtown.

== Etnovyr 2008 ==
Etnovyr 2008 was held from 20 to 23 August 2008. It took place on Rynok Square, Svobody Avenue and in Shevchenko's Grove. On 20 August there were march parade of participants, the opening of the festival and concert on Rynok Square. On 21 and 22 August on Rynok Square Ukrainian folklore groups performed, and in Shevchenko's Grove on the stage there was a continuous concert of participants, and on the lawn near the church there was fair of folk crafts. On 23 August there was a March parade of participants of "Etnovyr 2008", as well as launch of balloons on Rynok Square. Following foreign groups took part in "Etnovyr 2008":

- Poland, Folk team “Zywczanie”
- Mexico, Mexican traditional musical band “Tsasná”
- Martinique, Team «Pom Kanel»
- Israel, Folklore Dance Group "Jaffra"
- India, Pompi Paul
- Czech Republic, Valašsky soubor "Kašava"
- Cyprus, "Nicosia" Youth Center Folk Dance Group
- Côte d'Ivoire, Collective Boya star»

== Etnovyr 2009 ==
«Etnovyr 2009" was held from 20 to 24 August 2009 in Lviv and Truskavets. On 20 August there were parade of participants of festival "Etnovyr 2009" and concert on Rynok Square in Lviv. On 21 August in Shevchenko's Grove on the stage there was a continuous concert of participants, а and on the lawn near the church there was fair of folk crafts, in the evening there was a concert on Rynok Square. On 22 August participants of Etnovyr 2009 were at a reception at Mayor of Lviv Andriy Sadovyy; there were a parade of participants through the streets of Lviv and a gala concert in Lviv Opera House. On 24 August there was a gala concert of the festival in Truskavets. Following foreign groups took part in "Etnovyr 2009":

- India, Folklore ensemble “Punjab”
- Poland, The Cieszyn folk group "Ziemia Cieszyńska"
- Macedonia, Collective "Ilinden"

== Etnovyr 2010 ==
Folklore Festival "Etnovyr 2010" presented folk groups from various countries: Indonesia, Senegal, Portugal, Spain, Poland, Czech Republic and Ukraine. During the festival (from 20 to 23 August) the guests of celebrating had the opportunity to win tickets for a flight to anywhere in the world thanks to sponsorship of the company "AirBaltic". Partner of the festival was the dairy company "Halychyna".

== Etnovyr 2011 ==
IV International Folklore Festival "Etnovyr" whirled in the folklore whirlwind the most famous and most picturesque groups for four-year history of the festival. Dancers on stilts from France, expressive African drummers from Burundi, incredible Basques and flags jugglers from Italy staged a five-day extravaganza in Lviv! The festival has acquired the status of the largest folk festival in Ukraine and proves it every year adding to the program even more impressive components. So in 2011, besides the traditional march parade in downtown, which opened the festival, and the gala concert there were presented International cuisines on Rynok square and international championship of "living chess". Each team except for folklore also presented cuisine of the country to guests of the festival. On Rynok Square you could try Italian, African, French, and Ukrainian cuisine. Also for the first time at the festival the International championship of "living chess" was arranged – in the SEC King Cross Leopolis a large chessboard was placed, where teams competed for victory, and all festival guests cheered and watched this unusual action. The festival ended with a festive concert of all collectives participating on the occasion of 20th anniversary of Ukraine's independence in the SEC King Cross Leopolis.

== Etnovyr 2012 ==
V Anniversary International Folklore Festival "Etnovyr" distinguished itself by the highest number of viewers. The festival day started from march parade of collectives in downtown, which was accompanied by a large number of citizens and visitors alike. Vivid parade ended at the main festival stage on Rynok Square, where team members were noted with awards of the largest folk festival in Ukraine "Etnovyr". Gala-concert, which brought together, without exaggeration, a full house on Rynok Square, was stopped with downpour that suddenly gathered over Lviv. But even it could not disrupt the final part of the concert! For less than half an hour the element subsided and the audience assembled in minutes, because not all countries presented their brightest dances at the stage. Traditionally, the festival closing performance was held with Ukrainian Arcane – Turkey, Spain, Azerbaijan, Poland, Belarus and Ukraine united in one common dance on the occasion of closing of the V International Folklore Festival "Etnovyr". Within 5 days of the festival team members of all countries learned this dance to perform it for an audience of "Etnovyr". In all 5-day festival was attended by 75 thousand visitors.

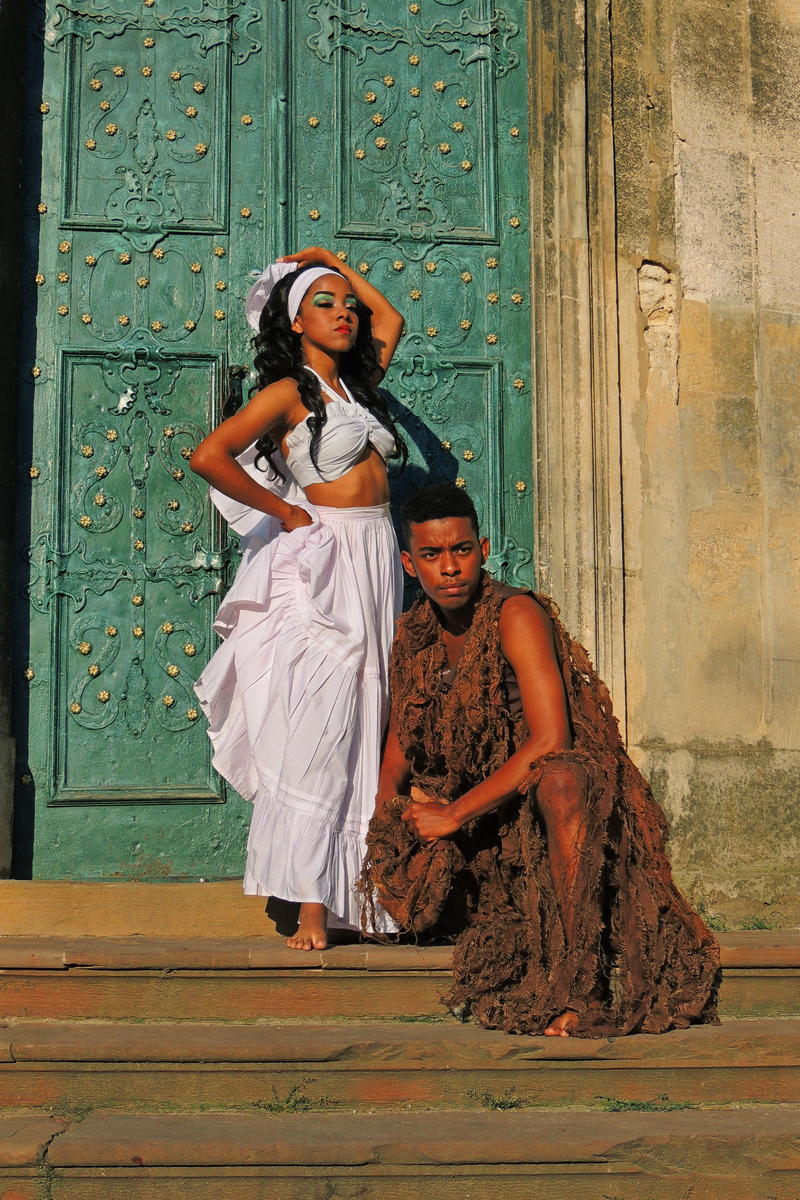
Members of the folk group from Panama

== Etnovyr 2013 ==
VI International Folklore Festival "Etnovyr" has been cancelled!

== Etnovyr 2019 ==
The impressive performances of ensembles, marching parades of the participants through the city, the folk costumes fashion show, friendship nights and dance master classes was held during International Folklore Festival Etnovyr 2019. Participants 2019:

- Panama, «Andrés Valiente Danzas y Proyecciones Folklóricas de Panamá»
- France, «Les Bethmalais»
- Poland, «Marynia»
- Latvia, «Viducis»
- Slovenia, Academic folklore group «Ozara»
- Colombia, National Folk Dance Company «Herencia Viva»

== Gallery ==
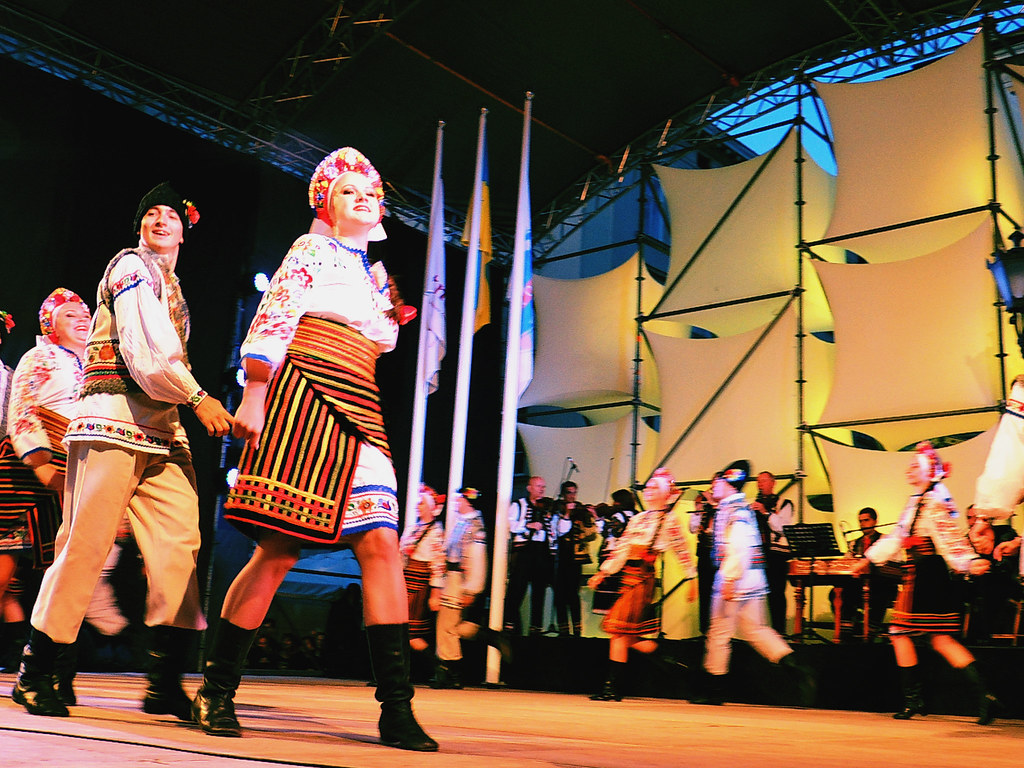

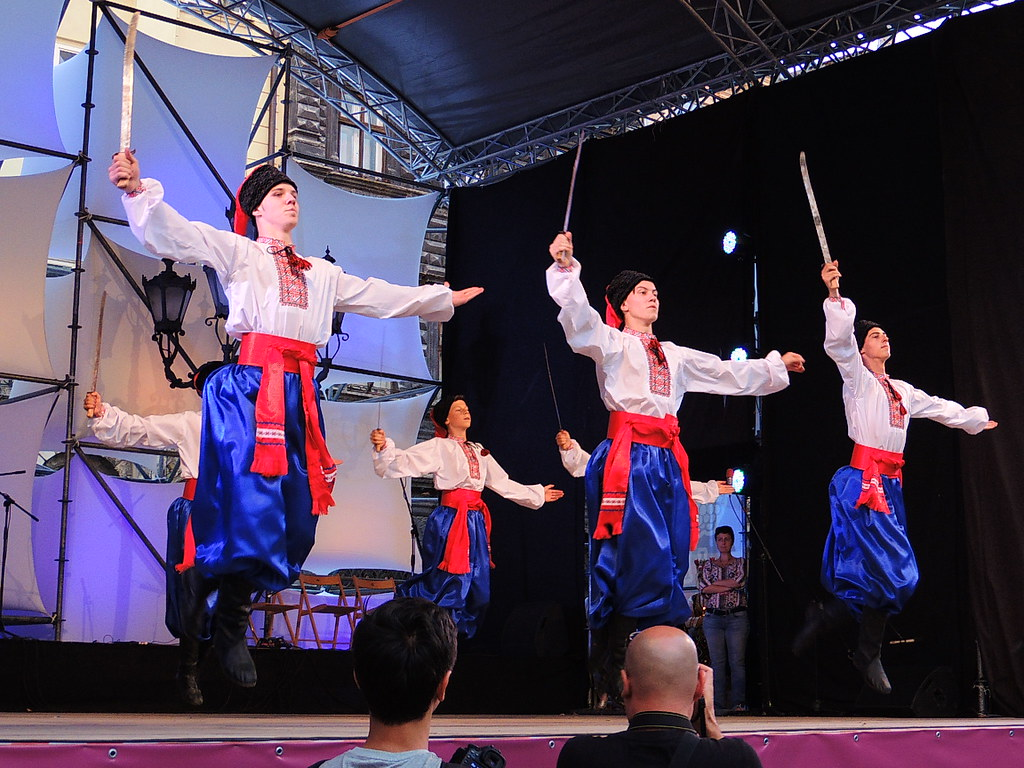

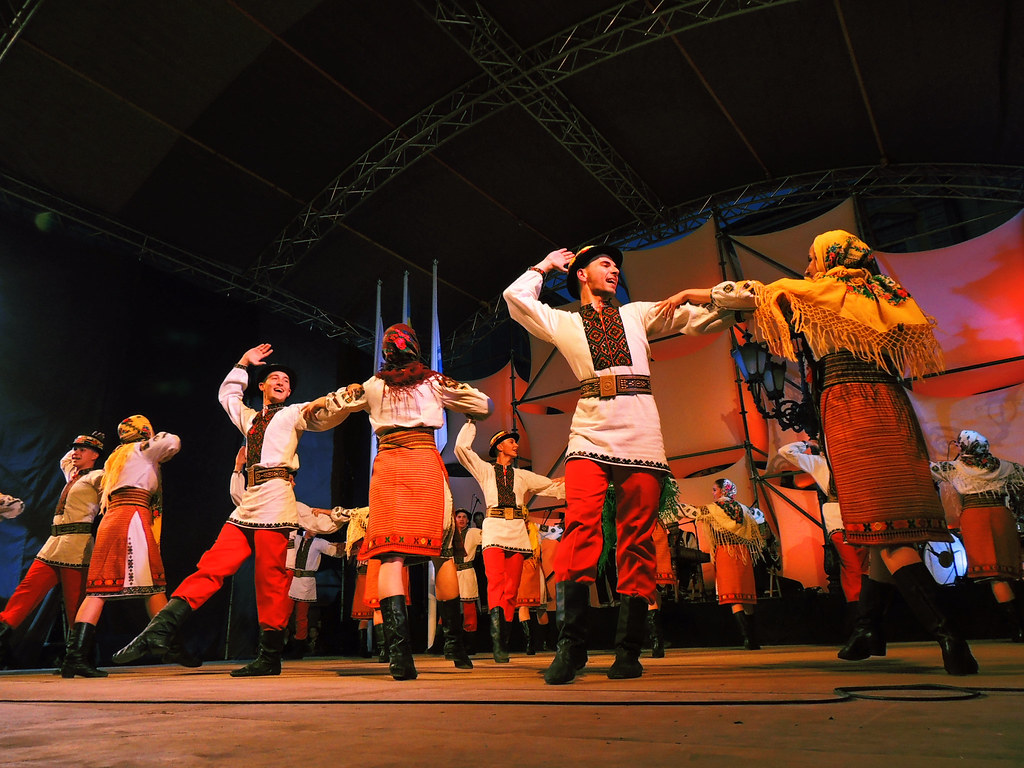

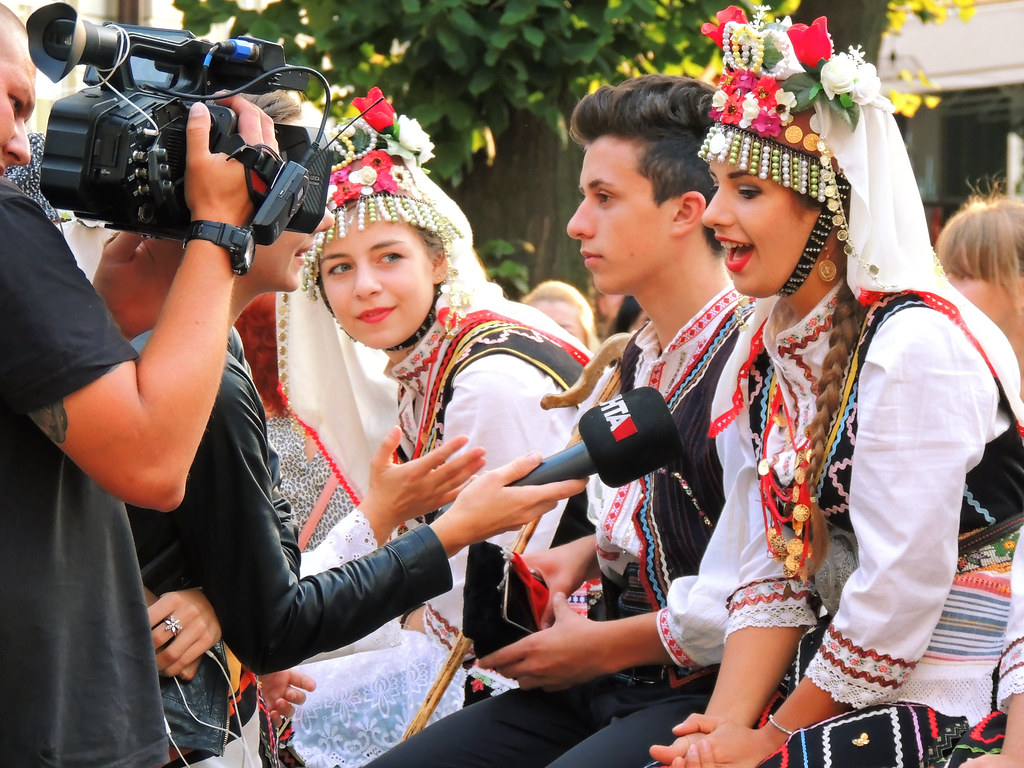

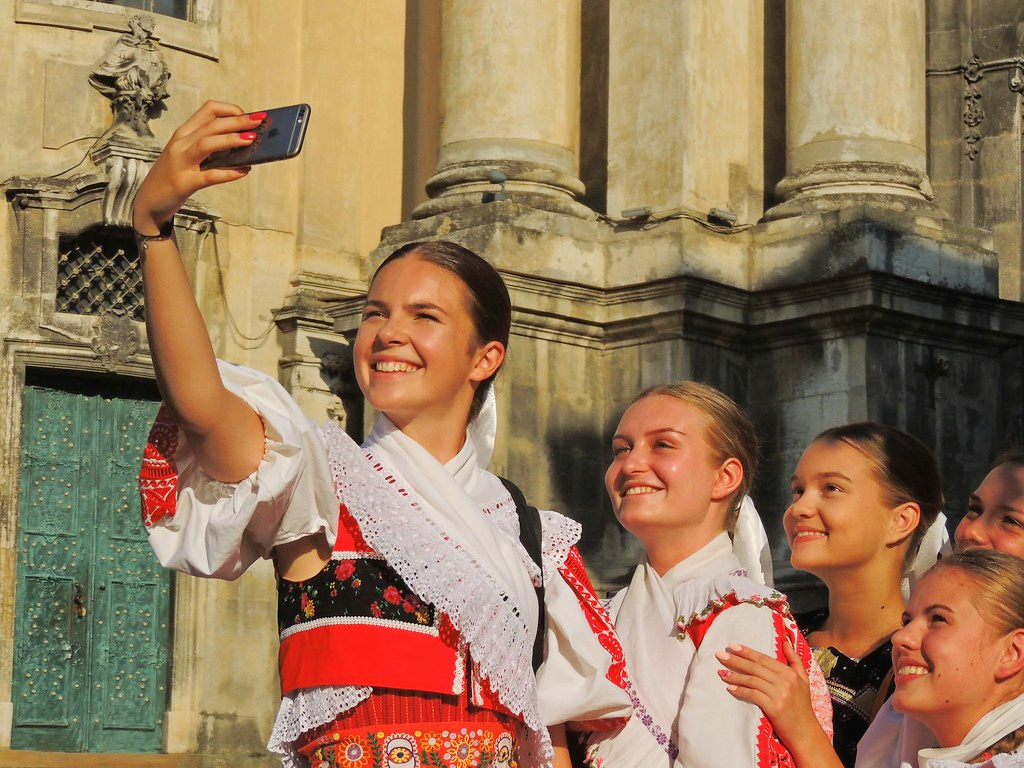

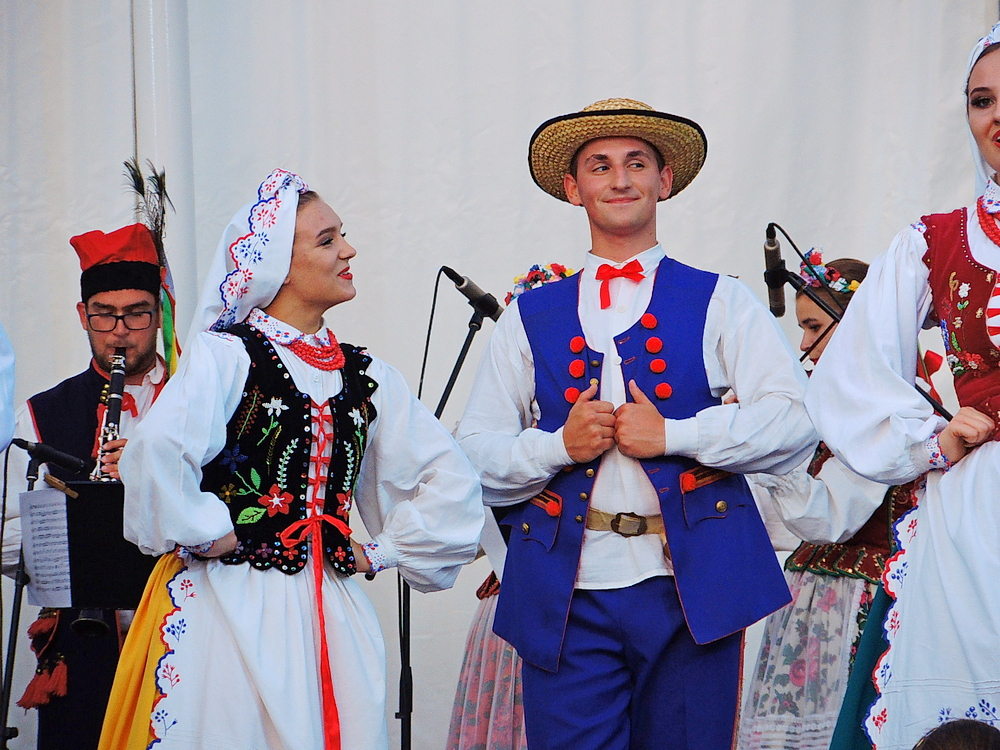

== Lviv Festivals organized by "Dik-Art" Company ==
- VI City Doughnut Festival
- VI National Chocolate Festival
- III Festival of Easter Eggs in Lviv
- ІІІ City Beer Festival
- VI City Holiday «Batyar’s Day in Lviv»
- ІІ Gastronomic Festival «Lviv on the plate»
- VI International Folklore Festival «Etnovyr»
- VII City Holiday «Have a cup of coffee in Lviv»
- IV Cheese & Wine City Holiday

== Link ==
- Official website of the festival
