= Faine Misto =

- Genre: Rock, metal, indie, alternative, electronic
- Locations: Ternopil (2013–2021); Lviv (2023–present), Ukraine
- Years active: 2013–2021, 2023–present
- Website: fainemisto.com.ua

Faine Misto (Ukrainian: Файне місто, lit. "Fine City") is a Ukrainian annual open-air music festival. It was held in Ternopil from 2013 to 2021, and has taken place in Lviv from 2023 onwards. The festival is notable for its genre diversity, its strong community identity, and, since the full-scale Russian invasion of Ukraine in 2022, its role as a charity fundraiser for the Ukrainian military.

== History ==
The festival was founded in 2013 by Maksym Cherkashyn, Rostyslav Plakhtsinskyi, Volodymyr Pasyaka, and Rustam Erheshov. Its name is derived from the song "Faine Misto Ternopil" by the Ukrainian band Braty Hadiukyni. The first edition was held on 20–21 July 2013 at the Chaika island in Taras Shevchenko Park in Ternopil. In 2014 the venue moved to Ternopil Airport, and in 2017 to Ternopil Hippodrome.

In 2020 the festival was cancelled owing to the COVID-19 pandemic. In its place, under the Faine Misto banner, the concert tour KaiFAINEmo was organised across 14 Ukrainian cities between 11 and 30 August 2020, featuring bands Motanka, Epolets and Space of Variations.

In 2022 the festival was cancelled because of the full-scale Russian invasion of Ukraine. An online event, Faine Misto Online, was held with exclusive performances, and on 26–28 August 2022 the festival co-organised a cross-border event, Faine Misto × Rockowa Noc, held in Rzeszów, Poland, together with the Polish rock festival Rockowa Noc, as a gesture of solidarity with Ukraine.

From 2023 onwards, the festival relocated to the !FESTrepublic venue in Lviv. In 2024, it was held as a charity event under the motto "Land of Future Legends", with the declared goal of raising 5 million hryvnias for the logistical and humanitarian needs of the Azov Brigade of the National Guard of Ukraine. By 2025, the fundraising target had risen to 35 million hryvnias (approximately $850,000) for the Azov Brigade's medical team.

On 20 November 2025 the festival launched its own quarterly print publication, FaineMo, described by the organisers as "the voice of the festival" and a new ongoing tradition.

== Editions ==
=== 2013 ===
The inaugural festival was held on 20–21 July 2013 at the Chaika island in Taras Shevchenko Park, Ternopil. Performers included Motor'rolla, O.Torvald, Flit, Mary, Kholodne Sontse, Los Colorados, Medovyi Polyn, Orataniia, Rock-H, Hutsul Kalipso, Epolets, We Are!!, Bezodnia, Sertsevyi Napad, Mekhanichnyi Apelsin, Trystavisim, K402, MY*17, Odyn, Far In Hate, AS/DS, Brem Stoker, Fiolet.

=== 2014 ===
Held on 12–13 July 2014 at Ternopil International Airport, with more than 40 performers across three stages: Main Stage, Rock Stage and Rave Box Stage.

Main Stage (MC: M'iach Dredboll): Scriabine, TNMK, O.Torvald, Rollik's, Irena Karpa & Qarpa, Tin' Sontsia, Karna, Ot Vinta!, Flit, Perkalaba, Los Colorados, Epolets, Bezodnia, The Last Fight, Sertsevyi Napad, Trystavisim.

Rock Stage (MC: Viktor Novosiolov): Skinhate, Jinjer, RIDEAU, To Leave A Trace, Medovyi Polyn, Cherry-merry, Fontaliza, Vorst, Kompas, ZSUF, 0352, Loskit, Dash, Affecting Dissent, The Jossers, Kimnata Hretkhen, Bugs Bunny, Po tu storonu, Kvitka Roku, Anebo, MilkIt, Friday Story.

Rave Box Stage (MC: MC Buria): King Kong Music, Myztical, Loki Lander, Topman, Leggo and others.

=== 2015 ===
Held on 3–5 July 2015 at Ternopil International Airport, under the motto Faine Misto – Territory of Free People!, with more than 70 performers across five stages.

Main Stage: Scriabine & Friends, Boombox, Brutto, Elizium, The HARDKISS, O.Torvald, All Faces Down (Austria), Karna, Tabula Rasa, Fiolet, Tin' Sontsia, Epolets, Flit, Los Colorados.

Tribute Stage: Dave Evans (1st AC/DC vocalist), D/C Train (AC/DC tribute), Richi Koliuchyi (Rammstein tribute), Scream Inc. (Metallica tribute), Wind of Change (Scorpions tribute), Blood Brothers (Iron Maiden tribute), Sheldon Cooper (Sum 41 tribute).

Dark Stage: ANNA, Toster, Rollik's, Skinhate, Jinjer, Eris Is My Homegirl (Poland), Rideau (Sweden), Morphine Suffering, Sertsevyi Napad, Latur, Hell:on, Sciana, Scratch The Floor (Georgia), Braincoats (Sweden), Dimicandum, Ratbite, Buldozer, [SALE]only, O'Hamsters, Ebola.

Light Stage: Odyn v Kanoe, Brunettes Shoot Blondes, Vivienne Mort, daKooka, Zapaska, Lika Bugaeva, PND, Panivalkova, Marija Cheba, Tape Flakes, Hapochka, NastiaZnykaye, MAiAK, Pleso, Cherokey, Secret Avenue, Lakeway, Switch On The Light, Piano.

=== 2016 ===
Held on 7–10 July 2016 at Ternopil International Airport, with more than 100 performers across six stages. International headliners included Lordi (Finland), Pain (Sweden), Crazy Town (USA), Zdob și Zdub (Moldova), Eskimo Callboy (Germany), Sea And Air (Germany), Rocky Leon (Austria), David Brown "Brazzaville" (USA), The New Division (USA), The Static Age (USA) and Intelligency (Belarus).

Other performers: Boombox, The HARDKISS, Brutto, TNMK, O.Torvald, Onuka, Antytila, Elizium, Mad Heads, Pianoboy, Irena Karpa & Qarpa, Rideau (Sweden), Epolets, Karna, The Vyo, Dai Darohu! (Belarus), Rokash, Trystavisim, Jinjer, Stoned Jesus, Morphine Suffering, Skinhate, Odyn v Kanoe, Flёur, Vivienne Mort, Brunettes Shoot Blondes, SINOPTIK and others.

=== 2017 ===
Held on 20–23 July 2017 at Ternopil Hippodrome, with more than 100 performers across six stages.

Main Stage performers included: Poets of the Fall, Guano Apes, Eskimo Callboy, Antytila, Druha Rika, TNMK, O.Torvald, Braty Hadiukyni, Zardonic, Heretic's Dream, Tarakany, Elizium.

Dark Stage performers included: Jinjer, Korpiklaani, Caliban, Rage, 1914, Annisokay, Space of Variations, ANNA.

Light Stage performers included: Khrystyna Soloviy, Bloom Twins, DaKooka, Odyn v Kanoe, Vivienne Mort, I Am Waiting for You Last Summer, Addis Abeba, Tabula Rasa.

=== 2018 ===
Held on 19–22 July 2018 at Ternopil Hippodrome. A notable novelty was the introduction of the "Passport of a Fine Person" loyalty booklet for festival-goers. Announced performers included The Rasmus, Amaranthe, Adept, To the Rats and Wolves, Tarja Turunen, Infected Rain, Beissoul & Einius and Joryj Kłoc.

=== 2019 ===
Held on 25–28 July 2019 at Ternopil Hippodrome. Main Stage performers included Arch Enemy, Powerwolf, Kadebostany, Eskimo Callboy, The HARDKISS, Boombox, O.Torvald, Detach, Epolets and others.

=== 2020 ===
The festival was cancelled due to the COVID-19 pandemic. In its place, the KaiFAINEmo concert tour visited 14 Ukrainian cities — Rivne, Lutsk, Lviv, Ivano-Frankivsk, Ternopil, Khmelnytskyi, Vinnytsia, Odesa, Mykolaiv, Zaporizhzhia, Dnipro, Kharkiv, Kyiv and Cherkasy — between 11 and 30 August 2020, featuring Motanka, Epolets, Space of Variations and local acts.

=== 2021 ===
Held on 28 July – 1 August 2021 at Ternopil Hippodrome. The KaiFAINEmo tour was again held beforehand, visiting 17 Ukrainian cities between 9 June and 1 July. Main Stage performers included: Burned Time Machine, Me And That Man, The HARDKISS, 5'nizza, Go-A, Druha Rika, TNMK, Louna, Zhadan i Sobaky, Karna, Wildways, O.Torvald, MOTANKA, Stoned Jesus, Kalush, Nizkiz, Smetana Band, Detach, Epolets, One Light Inside, Omana, Red Side, Orionix.

=== 2022 ===
The festival was cancelled due to the full-scale Russian invasion of Ukraine. An online charity event, Faine Misto Online, was held with exclusive performances. On 26–28 August 2022 a cross-border solidarity event, Faine Misto × Rockowa Noc, was co-hosted with the Polish festival Rockowa Noc in Rzeszów, Poland. Performers included Sick Solution, Ignea, Space of Variations, Stoned Jesus, Karna, Korpiklaani and others.

=== 2023 ===
Held on 28–30 July 2023 at the !FESTrepublic venue in Lviv, under the motto Stories Worth Hearing, with more than 70 performers across five stages.

Main Stage: Omana, Struktura Shchastia, Epolets, Odyn v Kanoe, Zhadan i Sobaky, Red Side, Fiolet, The Unsleeping, Grandma's Smuzi, TNMK, Mazepa, Dity Inzheneriv, Zwyntar, Khrystyna Soloviy, Vopli Vidoplasiova.

Dark Stage: 0%Mercury, Chumatskyi Shliakh, Sick Solution, Khaitspich, Burned Time Machine, True Tough, Fleshgore, Rolliks, IGNEA, Grayshapes, Telema, Obstruct, Veremii, DETACH.

Light Stage: Artyleriia, Renie Cares, Motor'rolla, Krykhtka, REIVA, Rohata Zhaba, Nytso Potvorno, YuYu, Rome, Tember Blanche, Wentseat, Dzhozers, Folkulaka, Sasha Boole, LELY45, Palindrom.

=== 2024 ===
Held on 2–4 August 2024 at !FESTrepublic, Lviv, under the motto Land of Future Legends, with more than 100 performers across six stages. The festival returned a Reggae Stage, named in honour of Max Rudskyi — a long-standing performer at the stage who was killed in the war. The main charitable purpose was to raise funds for the Azov Brigade.

Performers included: Zhadan i Sobaky, KARNA, Kurhan & Agregat, O.Torvald, Latexfauna, Vivienne Mort, Khrystyna Soloviy, Zwyntar, Palindrom, Dity Inzheneriv, Tember Blanche, ROME, 1914, Epolets, White Ward, Prozak, Sasha Boole and others.

=== 2025 ===
Held on 1–3 August 2025 at !FESTrepublic, Lviv, under the motto At the Turn of Epochs. The festival raised approximately 35 million hryvnias ($850,000) for the Azov Brigade's medical team.

Performers included: Vivienne Mort, Odyn v Kanoe, Zhadan i Sobaky, The Unsleeping, Faktychno Sami (ex-Qarpa), Kazhannia, Rohata Zhaba, Anastymoza, Epolets, Tsvyakh, ANNA, OTOY, Susidy Sterpliat', Krovna, Rolliks, NAZVA, IGNEA, Khamerman Znyshchuie Virusy, Yulia Yurina, Folkulaka & Khorror Khor, Skazhy Shchos' Pohane, Uliana Del Rey, Sick Solution, Kurhan & Agregat, True Tough, BLIND8, Burned Time Machine, Telema, HELL:ON, Maks Kidruk, Yurii Roketskyi, Autopsia Ostendam, Kabare "Psiacha Buda", Kabare na Kordoni and others.

=== 2026 ===
Announced for 31 July – 2 August 2026 at Arena Lviv, Lviv, under the motto The Way That Never Was.

Main Stage performers announced: Apatiia (31 July); Zwyntar, Lely45, Drug, Tsvyakh (1 August); Katarsis, Artem Pivovarov, OTOY, Uliana Del Rey (2 August).

Dark Stage performers announced: Tin' Sontsia, MegamasS, VØVK (31 July); Hämatom, Telema, Boanthropy, Nora Plan (1 August); ANNA, sportcafé, Kaosophia (2 August).

Light Stage performers announced: DK Enerhetyk, Kazhannia, Fiolet, Shmiska, Robanyi Yot (31 July); Monokate, BRYKULETS, Liza Bibikova, Skazhy Shchos' Pohane, BaWN (1 August); Yuko, Ship Her Son (2 August).
