= Iryna Shynkaruk =

Ukrainian singer (born 1979)

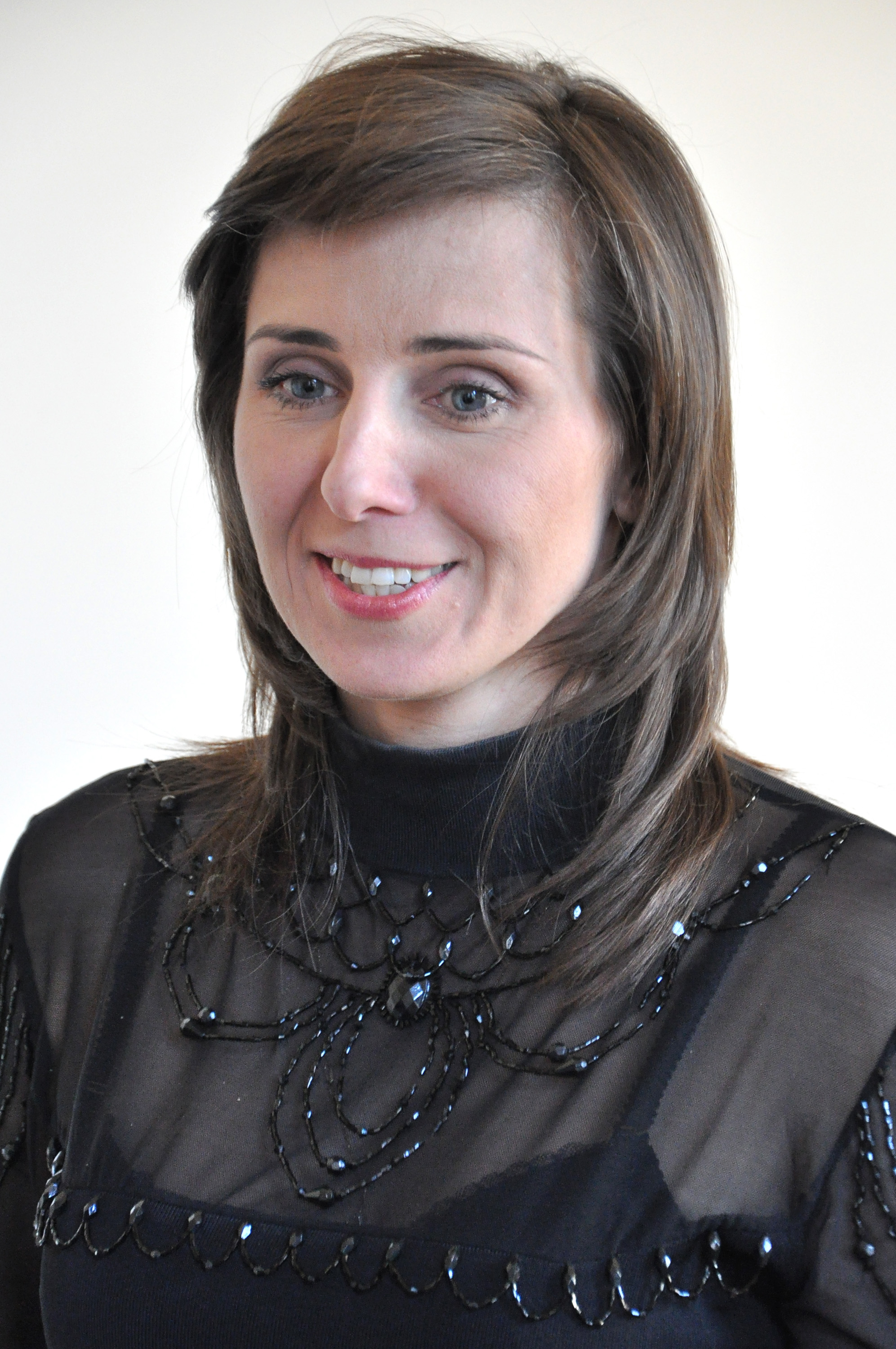
- Iryna Shynkaruk

Background information
- Born: 31 July 1979 (age 47); Fastiv, Kyiv Oblast, Ukrainian SSR
- Genres: magic rock
- Occupation: singer
- Years active: 1991–present
- Website: iryna.com.ua/bio.php?&lang=en

Iryna Shynkaruk (Ukrainian: Ірина Шинкарук, born on 31 July 1979) is a Ukrainian singer.

== Biography ==
Shynkaruk was born in 1979 in Fastiv, Kyiv region, in the Ukrainian SSR of the Soviet Union. She spent her childhood in Zhytomyr in western Ukraine but has lived in Kyiv for seven years. She graduated from the Zhytomyr State Teachers‘ Training University, where she studied philology, and the chorus leader and conductors‘ department at the School of Art. She also studied at the National University of Culture and Art, and later started work there as a teacher.

Shynkaruk first took part in pyrping concerts with her father, Volodymyr Shynkaruk at the age of four. In 1990, she won her first music contest, Zamkova Gora in Zhytomyr and went on to win numerous awards for her work. In 1994, she toured five European countries, Hungary, Slovakia, Poland, Germany, and France, together with the wines of Chervona Ruta ’93. Later she toured Austria, Greece, Kazakhstan, Uzbekistan, Cuba, United States, and Libya. She has recorded six music albums and two poetic collections. She is a soloist of the National Radio Company and the senior announcer of the Ukrainian TV Channel Culture.

As the specialists say, Iryna Shynkaruk opened a new style in modern Ukrainian music – magic rock. At present, her repertoire is dominated by dancing music. She is recording a cappella songs.

== Competitions and awards ==
- 1990 – Zamkova Gora, Zhytomyr
- 1991 – Solomjanyj Dzvin, Lutsk – First Prize
- 1991 – II Allukrainian Festival, Chervona Ruta, Zaporizhya – Prize The Hope
- 1992 – IV Allukrainian Festival Author's song Oberih, Lutsk – Diploma
- 1993 – Allukrainian Contest New Names, Kyiv – Diploma
- 1993 – III Allukrainian Festival Chervona Ruta, Donetsk – First Prize
- 1993 – International Festival Bilostotsky Malvy, Poland – Grand Prix
- 1993 – Allukrainian Festival of popular Ukrainian music Pisennyj Vernisazh, Kyiv – Diploma
- 1994 – Training courses Warsaw operetta, Poland
- 1994 – V International Festival The Voice of Asia, Kazakhstan – Diploma FIDOF, prize for the best song of the festival Misiachny Oberih
- 1997 – XIV The World Youth Festival, Cuba
- 1997 – Allukrainian rating popularity Zolota Fortuna, Kyiv – The best young singer of Ukraine
- 1998 – The World Festival Christian young, Austria
- 1998 – III International Festival The Sea of Friends, Yalta – Grand Prix
- 1999 – V Allukrainian TV Festival of the popular music Melodia, Lviv – Grand Prix
- 1999 – Volodymyr Ivasiuk Festival, Kyiv – Second Prize.

== Discography ==
- 1994 – П’ята пора року (The Fifth Seasons of the Year)
- 1996 – Я – наче птиця (I’m Like a Bird)
- 1998 – Перекоти-поле (Step Towards the Summer)
- 2000 – Іду до Вас (I’m Coming)
- 2004 – Відчуваю (I’m Feeling)
- 2006 – Це моя і твоя Україна (This is my and your Ukraine)

== Clips ==
- Ти минаєш (2002), directed by Viktor Pryduvalov
- ДЕТИДЕЯ (2003), directed by Andriy Novosiolov

== Poems ==
- Народження голосу (The Voice Birth) (2001)
- Відчуваю (I’m Feeling) (2004)
