= Stepan Hiha =

Ukrainian composer and singer (1959–2025)

- Степан Гіга
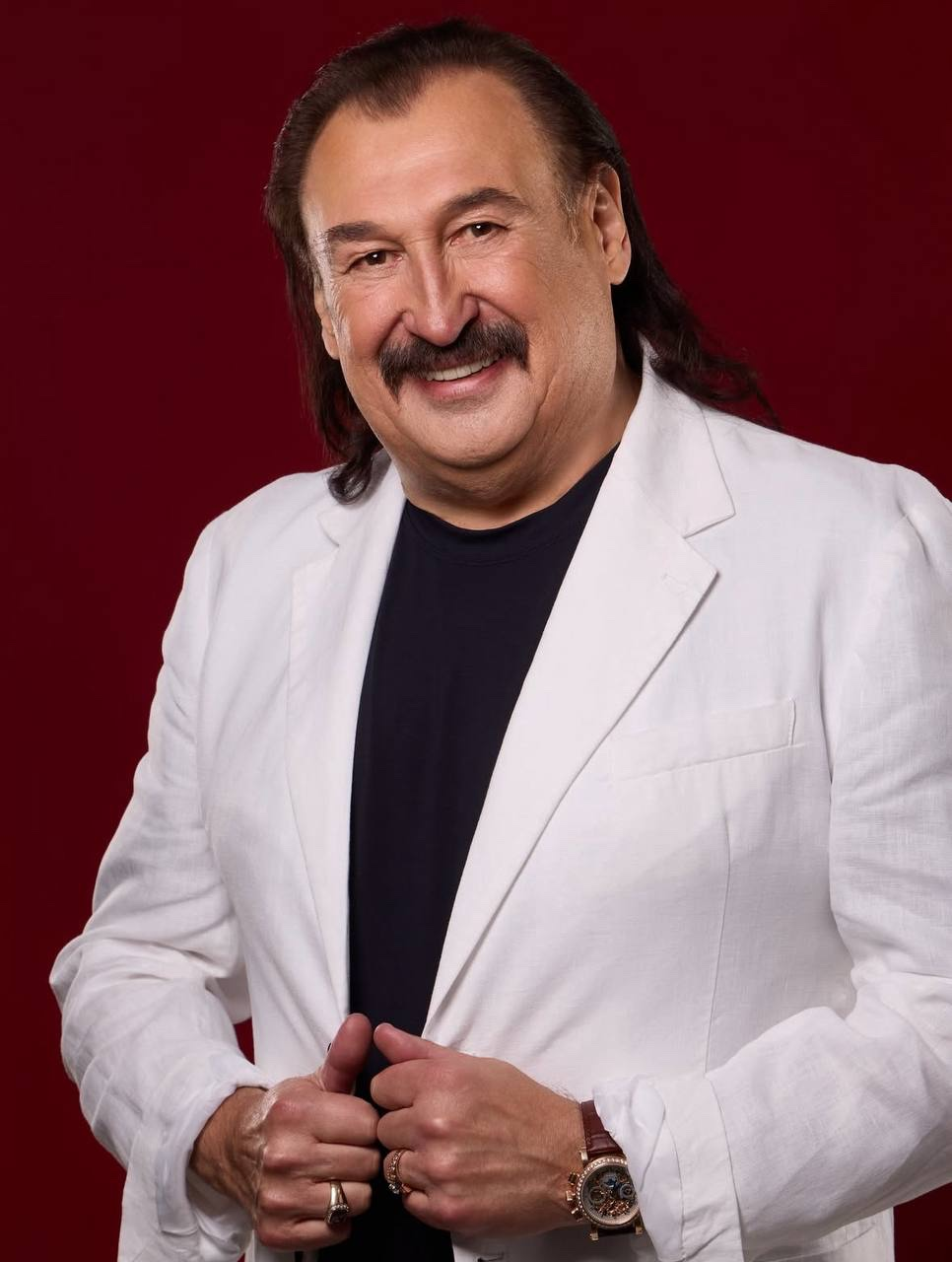
- Hiha in 2025
- Born: Stepan Petrovych Hiha; 16 November 1959; Bilky, Zakarpattia Oblast, Ukrainian SSR, Soviet Union
- Died: 12 December 2025 (aged 66); Lviv, Lviv Oblast, Ukraine
- Education: Kyiv Conservatory
- Occupations: Composer; singer
- Title: People's Artist of Ukraine; Merited Artist of Ukraine
- Website: stepangiga.com

Stepan Petrovych Hiha (sometimes Giga; Ukrainian: Степан Петрович Гіга; 16 November 1959 – 12 December 2025) was a Ukrainian composer, singer, associate professor and a People's Artist of Ukraine (2002). Being one of the most influential representatives of Ukrainian pop music in the second half of the 20th and early 21st centuries, Hiha combined academic vocal singing with a pop-musical repertoire. Among his most popular songs are "Zoloto Karpat", "Tsei son" and "Yavoryna". Hiha was among the few Ukrainian singers of the same era who have never performed in the Russian language.

Hiha was a member of the National Union of Composers of Ukraine and was the first person to be awarded the Golden Disc in independent Ukraine. As an associate professor, he was researching higher art education in Zakarpattia Oblast and the development of Transcarpathian pop music in the second half of the 20th century.

== Biography ==
=== Early life and education ===
Stepan Petrovych Hiha was born on 16 November 1959 in the village of Bilky, Zakarpattia Oblast. He was raised in a family of modest means, with parents who were ordinary labour workers.

In addition to attending a secondary school, he also took vocal and bayan classes. After completing ten years of school and serving in the Soviet Army, he enrolled in the Uzhhorod Music School, where he studied for only three years (1980–1983) rather than usual four. He was a member of the Green Carpathians ensemble starting from seventh grade to the end of his studies at the music school, and eventually rose to the position of the band's leader.

After passing the external examinations, in 1983 Hiha enrolled in the vocal faculty at the Kyiv Conservatory, where he was taught by Kostyantyn Ognevy.

Hiha was granted a special permit by the Ukrainian SSR's Ministry of Culture to attend the conservatory's educational program without restrictions. As a result, he was excused from seminars and lectures but not from tests and examinations. However, this leisure time enabled his participation and victory in more than ten distinct festivals and competitions. He joined the wildly popular synthesizer group Stozhary, which functioned at the Chernihiv Philharmonic, as a soloist during his second year of the conservatory. He also performed as a soloist at the Kyiv Conservatory's opera studio, which was directed by Dmytro Hnatyuk.

=== Career ===
Hiha was recommended to join the National Opera of Ukraine as a soloist after graduating from the conservatory, but after considering all the advantages and disadvantages, he declined. This was why it took him six months to receive a credential of graduation from a higher-education school.

The Volyn Philharmonic, where the ensemble Rendezvous was formed expressly for him, was one of the proposals he received at this time for additional work. He declined, though, and went back to his home region of Transcarpathia.

Hiha began his career as a soloist with the Zakarpattia Philharmonic in 1988 and, a year later, founded the jazz-rock group Beskyd. After the band disbanded in 1991, he found himself unemployed, which prompted him to begin writing songs and exploring musical arrangement. This creative shift eventually led to the establishment of his own recording studio.

In 1993, he launched his career as a pop vocalist, and in 1995 released his debut solo album Druzi Moi (My Friends). In 1999, he founded the S. Hiha Art Agency, which includes the band Druzi Moi, the show ballet Viklen, and the ballet troupe Boomer. This was followed by two more albums: Vulytsia Natali (Natalie Street) in 1999 and Troyandy Dlia Tebe (Roses for You) in 2005.

Hiha's popularity began to decline in the 2000s, despite notable achievements during that period. In 2000, he founded the recording studio GIGARecords, marking an important milestone in his musical career.

His album Natalie Street became a breakthrough success; by 2002, it had sold over one million copies, making him the first artist in independent Ukraine to receive a Gold Disc. Alongside his artistic pursuits, he also dedicated himself to music education, becoming an associate professor at the Ternopil Volodymyr Hnatiuk National Pedagogical University in 2006, and joining the Rivne Philharmonic as a soloist in 2007.

=== Later years and death ===
Although he had faded from the spotlight for some time, Hiha's music experienced a revival following the 2022 Russian invasion of Ukraine. Largely due to TikTok and other social media, his songs once again resonated deeply with Ukrainian audiences and gained widespread popularity. He became a sensation on social networks, where tracks including "Tsei son", "Yavoryna", "Tretiy tost", and "Zoloto Karpat" emerged as genuine hits.

That same year, he launched extensive national and international tours in support of the Armed Forces of Ukraine, further boosting his popularity and reaffirming his place in the hearts of fans. Hiha gave two concerts in Lutsk during one week in December 2022 and gave another concert in April 2023.

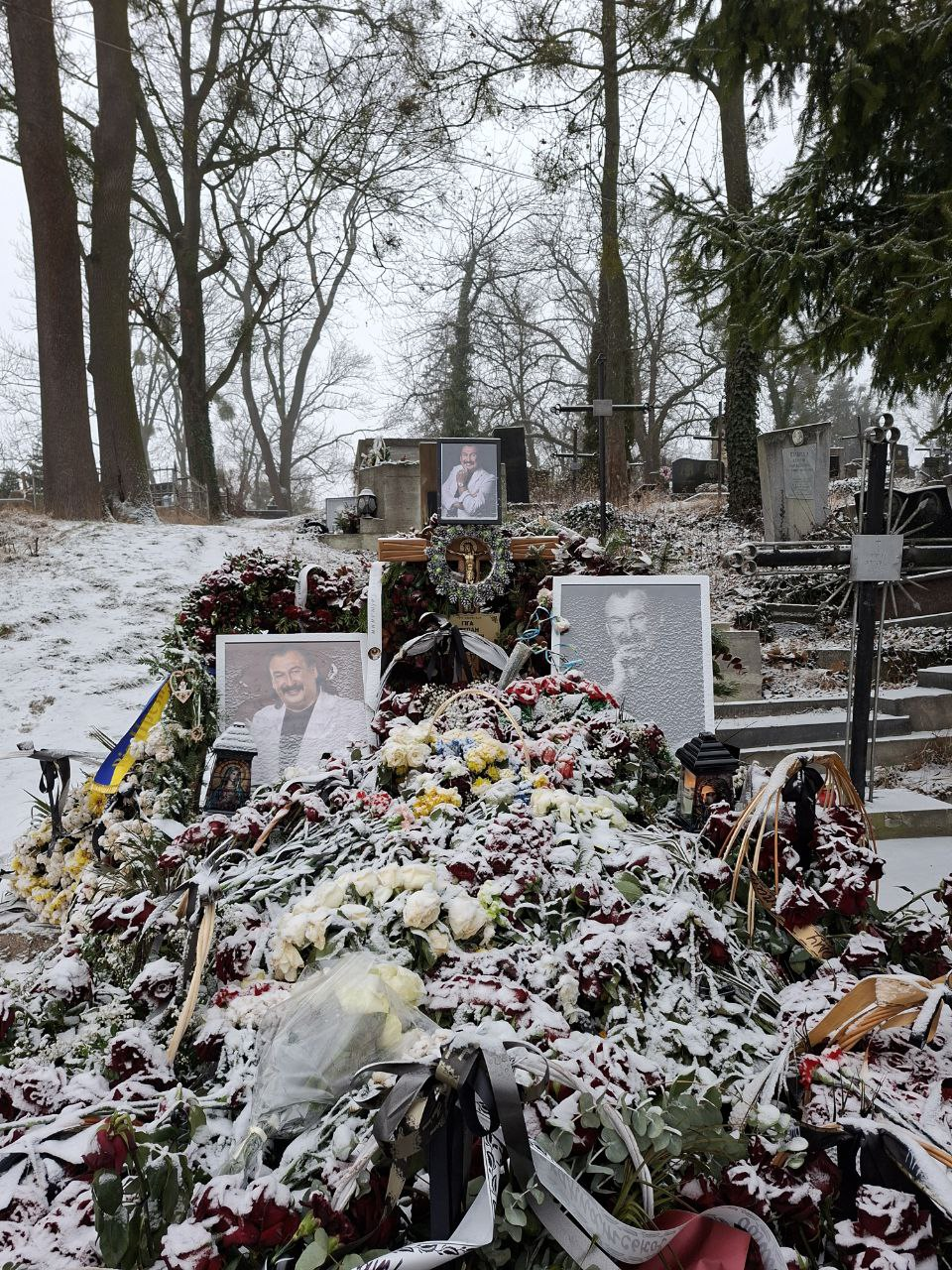
Grave of Stepan Hiha in December 2025

In November of 2025, Hiha was hospitalized due to complications associated with diabetes. He underwent a second surgery on the knee, after which his leg had to be amputated, which caused him to fall into a coma. On the evening of 12 December, Stepan Hiha died at the age of 66, after spending a month in the intensive care unit of the First Territorial Medical Center of Lviv. A farewell ceremony was held for Hiha on 14 December in the Saints Peter and Paul Garrison Church in Lviv. The next day, he was buried in the Lychakiv Cemetery.

== Work ==
Hiha collaborated with a number of poets, including Vasyl Kuzan, Vadym Kryshchenko, Stepan Haliabarda, A. Demydenko, A. Fihliuk, and A. Drahomyretskyi, among others.

As a songwriter, composer, and performer, he was known for other popular songs, including "Ostannia Nich" ("The Last Night"), "Natali", and "Koroleva" ("Queen"). His discography includes the albums Koroleva (1995) and Druzi Moi (1997). He toured extensively in France, Italy, Germany, Canada, and the United States.

== Discography ==
=== Studio Albums ===
- 1995 — Druzi moi
- 1997 — Koroleva
- 2001 — Vukytsia Natali
- 2004 — Troyandy dlia tebe
- 2009 — Druzi moi 2
- 2014 — Doroha do khramu

=== Singles ===
Year	Name	Peak chart positions	Album
Year	Name	UKR TOP 40	Album
2021	"Khai Isus male dytia" (feat. Kvitoslava, Steve G and Daniel)	—	Non-album singles
2021	"Son" (feat. Lesyk and Karp)	—	Non-album singles
2022	"Molymos za Ukrainu"	—	Non-album singles
2022	"Zaгадаю ya bazhannia"	—	Non-album singles
2022	"Za tebe vse viddam"	—	Non-album singles
2022	"Tsey son" (feat. Lesia Nikitiuk)	—	Non-album singles
2022	"Oi, u luzi chervona kalyna" (feat. Kvitoslava, Steve G and Daniel)	—	Non-album singles
2022	"Odna liubov na dvokh"	—	Non-album singles
2022	"Zoloto Karpat (Version 2.0)" (feat. Glova and Manin)	—	Non-album singles
2024	"Tsey son" (feat. Lera Mandziuk)	—	Uroky tolerantnosti OST
2025	"Smereky oseni ne znayut"	—	Non-album singles
2025	"Mamma Mia" (feat. The Vusa and Artem Pyvovarov)	21	Non-album singles
"—" denotes a recording that did not chart.

== Personal life ==
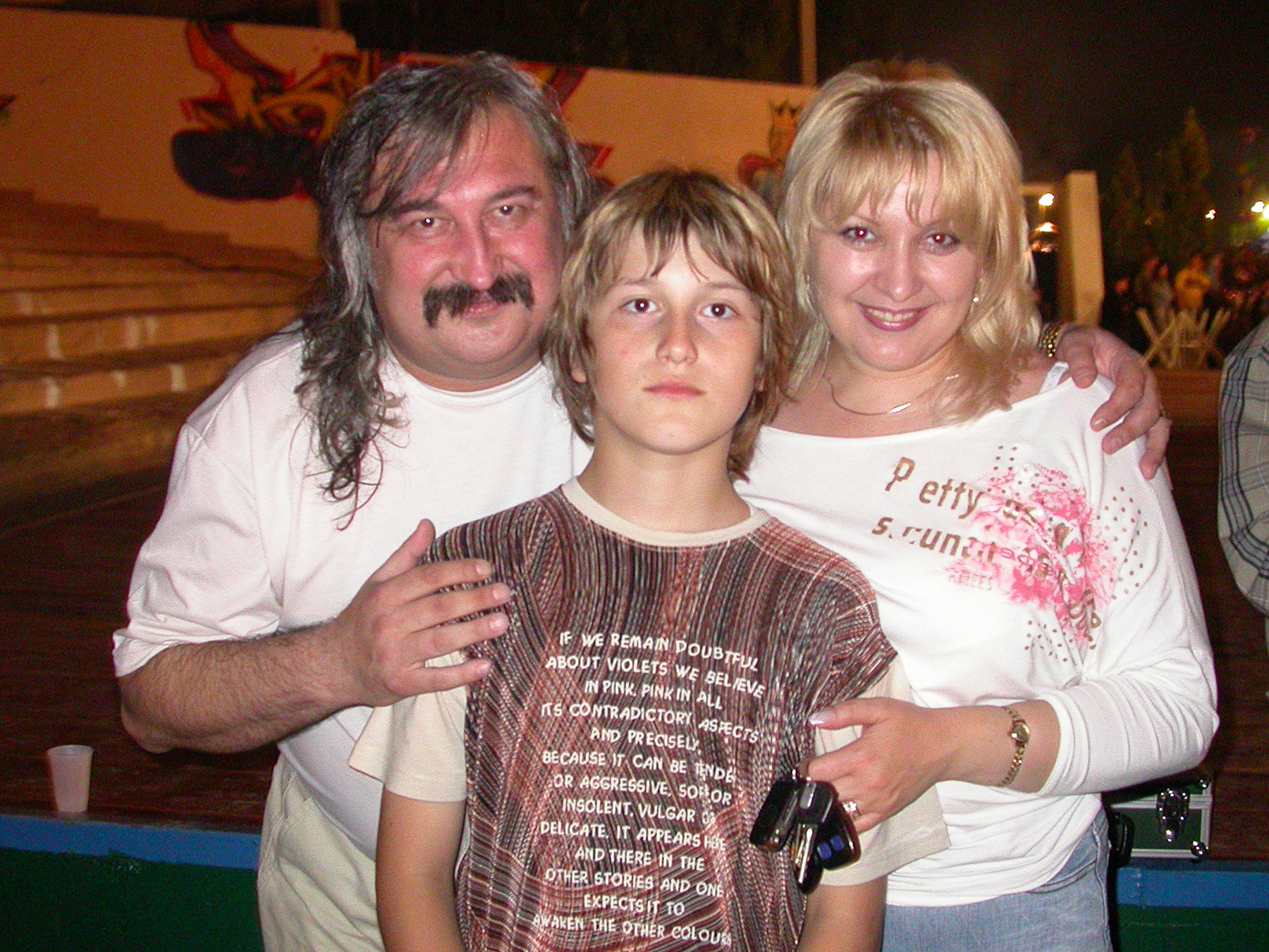
Stepan Hiha with his wife and son in 2005

Hiha was married and had two children. His widow, Halyna, is the director of the GIGARecords recording studio and formerly served as an administrator at the Transcarpathian Philharmonic. Hiha's son Stepan and daughter Kvitoslava often performed songs set to their father Hiha's music and also accompanied him on independent tours.

== Honours and awards ==
Hiha was awarded the following:

- Winner of the Grand Prix at the International Festival "Zoloti Trembity" (1990)
- Merited Artist of Ukraine (1998)
- Order of Prince Konstantin Ostrozhsky First Class (2000)
- People's Artist of Ukraine (2002)
- Order of Cossack Glory Third Class (2003)
- Golden Disc Award (2003)
- Order of the Nativity of Christ (2004)
- Order of Andrew the First-Called II Class (2005)
- Order of Andrew the First-Called I Class (2006)
- Order of Merit Third Class (2009)
