= Mustache Funk =

2021 documentary film

- Theatrical release poster
- Directed by: Oleksandr Kovsh
- Written by: Vitalii Bardetskyi
- Produced by: Andriy Hranitsa
- Release dates: August 2020 (Molodist); June 24, 2021
- Country: Ukraine
- Language: Ukrainian

Mustache Funk (Ukrainian: «Вусатий фанк», romanized: Vysatyi fank) is a Ukrainian documentary film written by Бардецький Віталій Ярославович and directed by Oleksandr Kovsh. The film details the emergence of pop music in the Ukrainian SSR during the 1970s.

The film was premiered at the 49th Kyiv International Film Festival "Molodist" in late 2020 and was released in Ukrainian cinemas on June 24, 2021.

== Background ==
In the late 1960s, the Soviet politburo directed the creation of musical groups analogous to those of the West in a bid to sway the youth from western music. These groups, known as Vocal and Instrumental ensembles, went on to usher what some call the "golden era" of Ukrainian pop music. The creators of the film gave it the name Mustache Funk because most members of famous bands of the time wore a mustache.

The film explores the stories of various groups from this era including Smerichka, Svityaz, Arnica, Kobza, Patterns of Roads, March, Bells, and Waterfall.

The film was written by Vitaliy "Bard" Bardetsky, a Ukrainian music journalist, concert promoter, and ex-manager of several Ukrainian pop bands including Ocean Elsa and Skryabin.

== Production and Release ==
The film was created by the studio "T.T.M." and uses archival and unused media. The project was a winner at the 10th State Cinema Competition which made it the recipient of ₴1.7 million of support from the State Film Agency of Ukraine and the Ministry of Culture of Ukraine. It was shot in 2019 but its release was delayed due to the COVID-19 pandemic. It was eventually released on 24 June 2021 in Ukraine.

== Reception ==
The Russian-language Ukrainian information portal "ITC.ua" gave the film 4 out of 5 stars, writing that "this is an accurate story about original Ukrainian music, [which] was much more interesting and progressive than Soviet views on culture."
