= Bilky, Khust Raion =

Bilky Білки
- Village
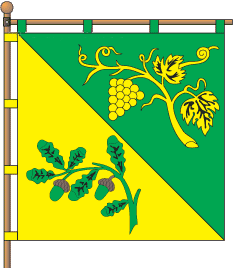
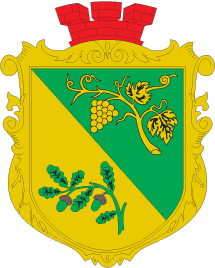
- Flag Coat of arms

- Location within Zakarpattia Oblast Location within Ukraine
- Coordinates: 48°19′46″N 23°08′23″E
- Country: Ukraine
- Oblast: Zakarpattia Oblast
- Raion: Khust Raion
- Established: 1338

Area
  - Total: 44 km^{2} (17 sq mi)
- Elevation /(average value of): 175 m (574 ft)

Population
  - Total: 8,064
  - Density: 180/km^{2} (470/sq mi)
- Time zone: UTC+2 (EET)
  - Summer (DST): UTC+3 (EEST)
- Postal code: 90132
- Area code: +380 3144
- Website: селище Білки, райцентр Іршава ^{(Ukrainian)}

Bilky (Ukrainian: Бі́лки; Hungarian: Bilke) is a village in Khust Raion of Zakarpattia Oblast, Ukraine. The village covers an area of 4,4 km^{2}. The population of the village is about 8 064.

== Geography ==
Village Bilky located in the center of the Transcarpathian region (Zakarpattia Oblast) on the altitude of 175 metres (570 ft) above sea level, that is situated in the river valley Borzhava.
It is at a distance 93 kilometres (58 mi) from the regional center of Uzhhorod, 11 kilometres (6.8 mi) from Irshava, and 52 kilometres (32 mi) from Mukachevo.

== History ==
Sites associated with the Kushtanovytsia archaeological culture (7th–3th centuries BC) have been discovered within the territory of the village. On the northwestern outskirts of the village lies a burial mound complex comprising 45 mounds and covering an area of approximately 2 km^{2}. On the southern outskirts, a settlement covering 3–3.5 hectares was discovered, where the remains of an above-ground structure were identified.

The first written record of the village Bilky dates back to the first half of the 14th century. In his charter of 1338, King Charles I of Hungary ordered the establishment of the boundaries of the estate of Karachun—a local feudal lord and Vlach. Bilky (mentioned in the document as Bylke) was the center of this estate.

But there have been found remains of three settlements in of the Neolithic (IV-III millennium BC) in the village. It has preserved remains of the Slavic of the settlement 8th-9th century AD.

== Religious organizations ==
In the village, there are religious community of the Ukrainian Greek Catholic Church and Ukrainian Orthodox Church. There are two temples.

- Church of Saints Peter and Paul of Ukrainian Orthodox Church (1939).
- Holy Assumption church of Ukrainian Greek Catholic Churches (UGCC) (1838).

== Notable people ==
- Ivan Ihnatko (born 1898 - died 1963), deputy of the Soim.
- Ivan Firtsak (born 1899 - died 1970), circus performer, athlete, wrestler and boxer
- Stepan Hiha (born 1959 - died 2025), composer and singer
