= Ivan Firtsak =

Ukrainian strongman

Ivan Fedorovych Firtsak-Kroton (autonym Firtsak) (Ukrainian: Іва́н Фе́дорович Фі́рцак-Кротон; July 28, 1899, Bilky (now Irshava district of Zakarpattia Oblast of Ukraine) — November 10, 1970, the same place) was a Ukrainian circus performer, athlete, wrestler, boxer and freestyle wrestler, once said to be the world's strongest man.

== Biography ==
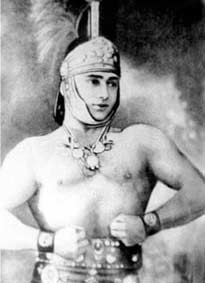
In such a uniform Firtsak Kroton performed on circus arena

He was born in a peasants’ family. In 1899 he moved to Prague to earn a living, where he first worked at a circus.

In the 1920s he began to win fighting tournaments and competitions in Prague. He repeatedly became a winner of the Prague heavy-weight club Prague—Bubenech and became a champion of Czechoslovakia in hand-to-hand fighting and weight-lifting. Later, he was a circus performer at the Hertsfert-circus. He visited a majority of European countries and traveled to the United States. He performed under the pseudonym Ivan-Syla (Strong Ivan) in 64 countries. His routine included ripping iron chains apart; bending nails with his fingers, making stick figures; lying on broken glass while hefting 500 kilograms of weight and juggling heavy objects.

He competed against world champions in boxing. Later he took the name of the legendary Kroton-hero (Сroton), who came to the Olympic stadium with a bull on his shoulders, holding it for more than an hour and a half. Firtsak matched this feat. Later he toured Europe and America, in solo shows. He performed before the English Queen. He was a winner of the body show in Paris. In 1928 he was acknowledged to be the strongest man on the planet.

After the USSR took control and Soviet power was established, the NKVD confiscated all of Croton’s awards, honors, and even photographs in an attempt to erase every trace of this outstanding Ukrainian from history. The silencing of Ivan Syla’s legacy during the Soviet era was also largely due to the fate of his son. In the postwar years, Ivan Firtzak Jr., only 18 years old, was sentenced by Soviet authorities to 25 years in labor camps on fabricated charges of belonging to the OUN. He served nearly eight of those years. According to eyewitnesses, the young man’s only “crime” was singing Ukrainian songs. In the USSR, anything Ukrainian was perceived as a threat, and the destruction of Ukrainian identity was carried out systematically. Ivan Firtzak Jr. was his father’s great hope. He always performed alongside him and became the Ukrainian SSR boxing champion in the early postwar years. This is how the Soviet system destroyed talented, strong, and successful Ukrainians—and erased their stories. One of the causes of Ivan Firtzak’s death was a platinum plate implanted in his skull, which required replacement. During Soviet times, almost no one was allowed to travel abroad, making it impossible for him to leave the country for a planned medical procedure. As a result, the wound beneath the plate became infected. A doctor who regularly traveled from Irshava to treat the athlete was unable to help. Ivan Firtzak died on November 10, 1970, in his native village of Bilky. His funeral was attended by large crowds—many athletes came to bid farewell to Croton. He was laid to rest at the cemetery in the Teliyatynec hamlet.

== Recognition ==
- Since 1999 the annual competitions in weight-lifting on I. Firtsak-Kroton’s award are conducted in the village Belki.
- The writer Anton Kopinets wrote the book Kroton about his life.
- In 2013 Viktor Anriyenko made the movie Ivan (Strong Ivan) about him. The leading role was performed by Dmitriy Khaladzhi.

In 2016 Uzhhorod renamed the Nikolai Vatutin street to Ivan Firtsak street.
