= Dmytro Khaladzhi =

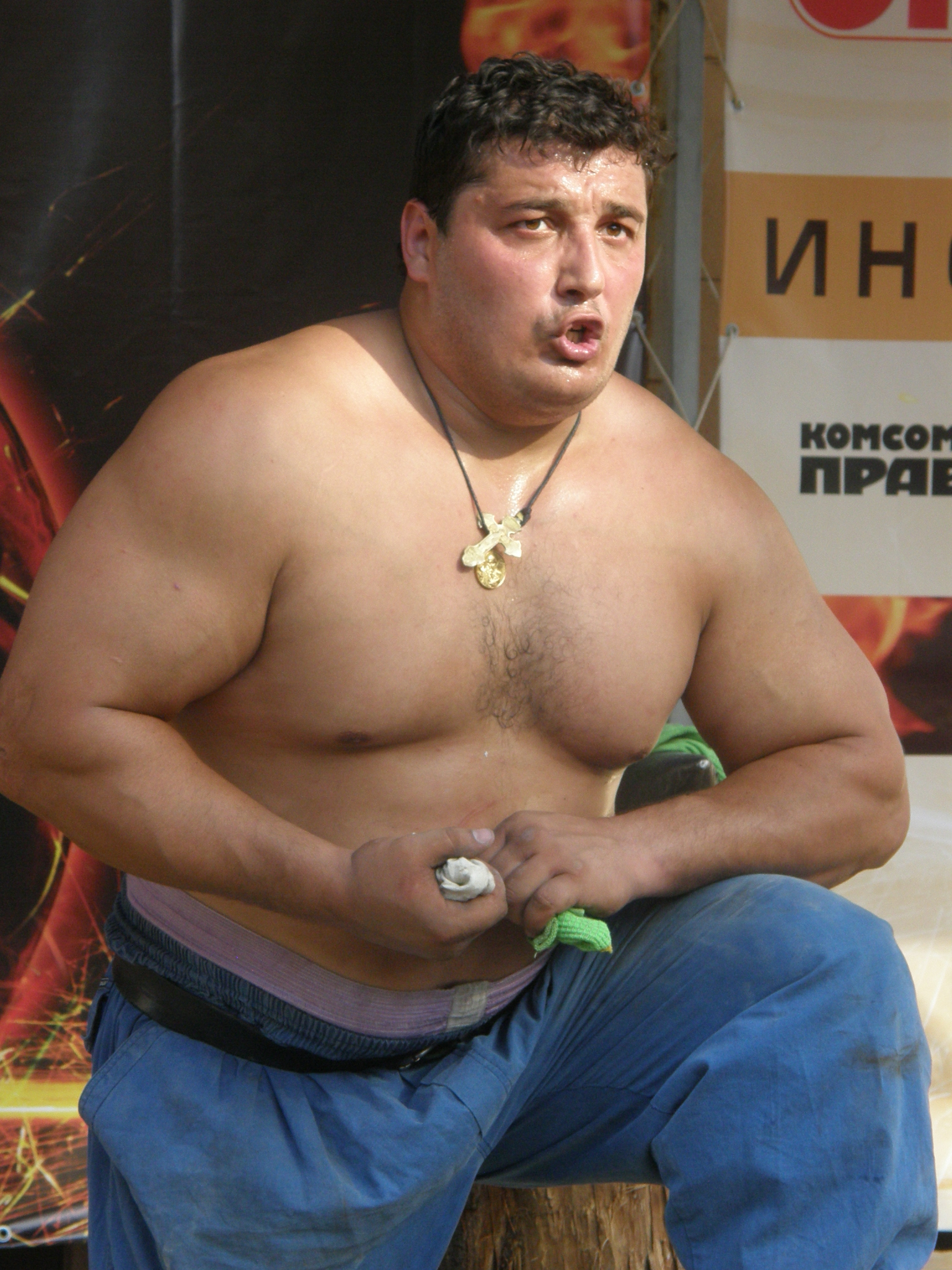
- Born: Дмитро Халаджі; 19 April 1979 (age 47); Komsomolske, Donetsk Oblast, Ukraine
- Occupations: Strongman, powerlifting, extreme powerlifting

Dmytro Khaladzhi (Ukrainian: Дмитро Халаджі; born 19 April 1979), is Ukrainian sportsman of Greek descent. He is champion of the 1st championship of the Ukrainian Drug-free Powerlifting Federation (in bench press) in 2009. In addition, he has also become a champion in hand-to-hand combat and traditional wrestling.

He is widely known as the "strongest man in Donbas" and "the strongest man in Ukraine".

== Biography ==
Khaladzhi is of Greek descent. At the age of 4 Khaladzhi was burned by an overturned teapot with boiling water, 35% of his skin was damaged. He had seven surgeries and received 12 blood transfusions. After the illness his muscles atrophied and at age 6, Khaladzhi had to learn to walk again.

He performed in the Donetsk circus, doing the acts "Heracles and the Nymphs" and "Heracles and the Bears". In 2009 he participated in the show Ukraine's Got Talent, and made it into the finals and refused to participate further.

He wrote several stories about the prominent athletes, and was awarded the literary prize The Golden Pen of Rus in 2010.

In 2013 he performed a leading role in the movie Ivan (Strong Ivan) about the Ukrainian strong man Ivan Firtsak-Kroton, of the 1930s. All the tricks in the film were completed by Khaladzhi, without editing.

== Records ==
Dmytro Khaladzhi's performance at the 12th blacksmith festival

- Lifting a 152-kg stone, one-handed. The ancient Greek athlete Bybon, who lived in the 6th century BC, lifted with one hand a stone which weighed 143.5 kg. The original weight lifted by Bybon is kept in the museum of Olimpiya city. The stone is inscribed in ancient Greek: "I, Bybon, managed to rend off this stone from the ground and lift it one-handed above the head".
- Curling up two kettlebells (50.5 and 40.5 kg) to handstand: with the right hand – 6 lifts in 46 seconds, with the left hand – 8 lifts in 49 seconds. (Kazan, 2010)
- The cross with weights (39.5 and 38.5 kg) on little fingers (Kazan, 2010).
- Binding six 20 cm nails in a minute and a half.
- "Devil’s Smithy" — Khaladzhi was laid down on the nails, and three concrete blocks (full weight 700 kg) on his breasts were broken by sledge-hammers.
- He lifted a one-meter pipe (1,022 kg) and kept it aloft for 12.5 seconds (Donetsk).
