= Pop music in Ukraine =

Pop music in Ukraine is Western influenced pop music in its various forms that has been growing in popularity in Ukraine since the 1960s.

== History ==
=== Emergence ===
Development of Ukrainian pop music started in the late 1960s with the emergence of big-beat youth bands and vocal-instrumental ensembles such as Vodohrai, Hrono, Dzvony, Smerichka, Stozhary etc. During the Soviet era this type of music was known as "Estrada".

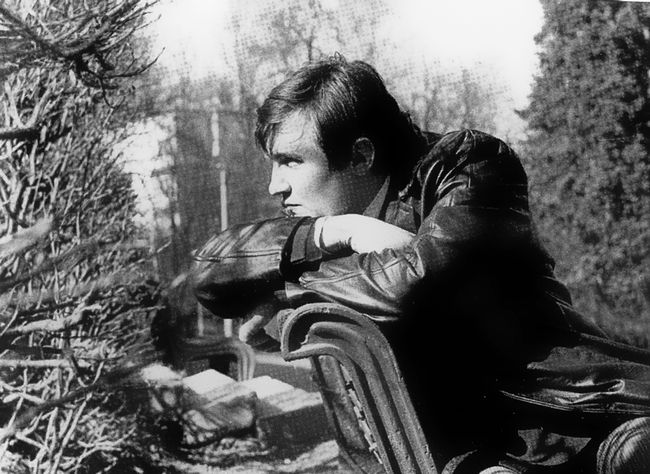
Volodymyr Ivasiuk

=== 1970s ===
The 1970s saw the emergence of a number of folk rock groups in Ukraine. One of the most prominent was a group known as Kobza which included 2 electric banduras. It began as an instrumental group playing folk inspired cool jazz. Other groups gradually appeared on the scene primarily from Western Ukraine such as Medikus and Smerichka.

Major contributions to Ukrainian pop music were made by songwriter Volodymyr Ivasiuk and singers Sofia Rotaru and Nazariy Yaremchuk.

In a development the KGB defined as "radio hooliganism", from the end of the sixties thousands of high-school and college students In Dnipropetrovsk became ham radio enthusiasts, recording and rebroadcasting western popular music. Annual KGB reports regularly drew a connection between anti-Soviet behavior and enthusiasm for western pop culture, but in 1980 conceded that all ideological and police efforts had failed to stem its spread.

=== 1980s ===
After the death of Volodymyr Ivasyuk in 1979, developments in Ukrainian pop music almost ground to a halt. Even established folk -rock groups such as Kobza began to sing in Russian. The songs of Ivasiuk were rarely heard on the radio and many of the established singers such as Sofia Rotaru began to sing in Russian exclusively.

Many Ukrainian musicians moved to Moscow, and various Moscow-based pop groups created songs in the Ukrainian language such as the group Samotvety – Verba.

Following Mikhail Gorbachev's perestroika reforms, a small number of pop acts such as Russya and Vechirnya Shkola came on the scene, performing in the genre Soviet Italo-disco-pop that was becoming popular throughout the USSR.

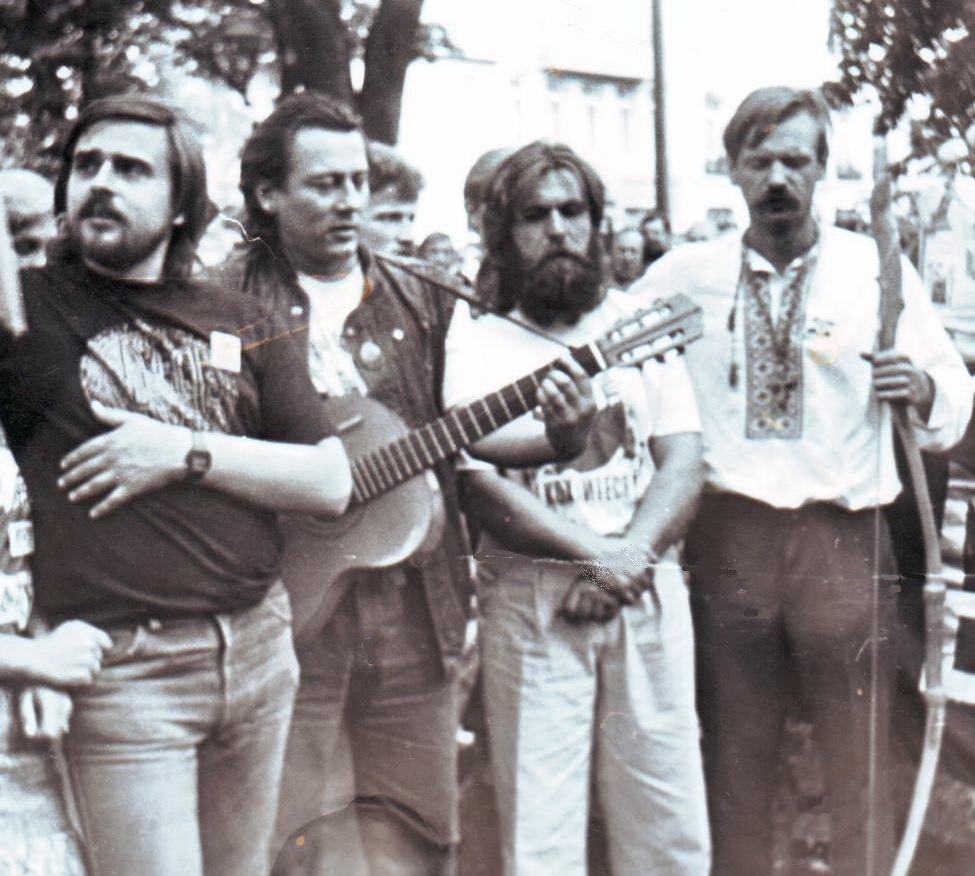
Participants of Chervona Ruta festival performing in Lviv, 1989

=== 1990s ===
The 1990s saw an explosion in the Ukrainian Pop music world. This was brought on by the Chervona Ruta Festival which was held in Chernivtsi in 1989 and sponsored by the Kobza corporation and Pisennyi Vernisazh, and New Ukrainian Wave 92 (Kyiv) sponsored and produced by the Rostyslav - Show Agency. At the end of the 80's it was considered that Ukrainian language based rock would not be influential, but the sponsoring of an exclusively Ukrainian-language music festival did much to change this perception. Music groups that came to prominence at this time were:

- Komu Vnyz
- Ne zhurys'
- Taras Petrynenko and Hrono

In the 1990s Ukrainian music was still growing in popularity. Green Grey was by far the most popular trip hop group in the country and the first Ukrainian band that was endorsed by Pepsi. The band did many concerts internationally. At the end of the 90's the most popular Ukrainian pop singer among teenagers was Yurko Yurchenko. Many compared the level of fanaticism among the visitors of his concerts with the band "The Beatles".

=== 2000s ===
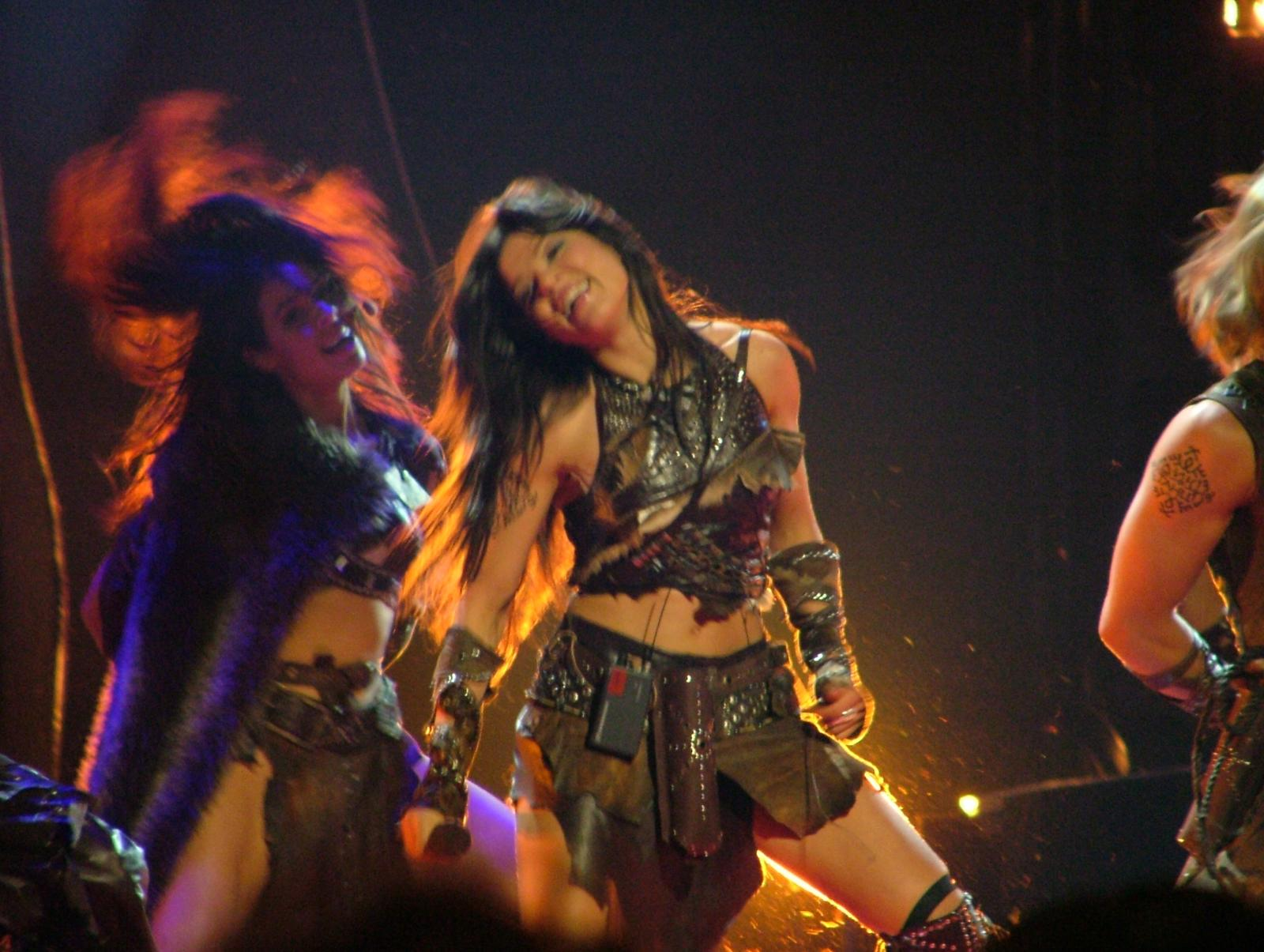
Ruslana performing Wild Dances at the Eurovision Song Contest 2004

In recent times folkloric elements have made a resurgence in modern Ukrainian pop music. Hutsul folk melodies, rhythms and dance moves were used by Ruslana, winner of the Eurovision Song Contest 2004.

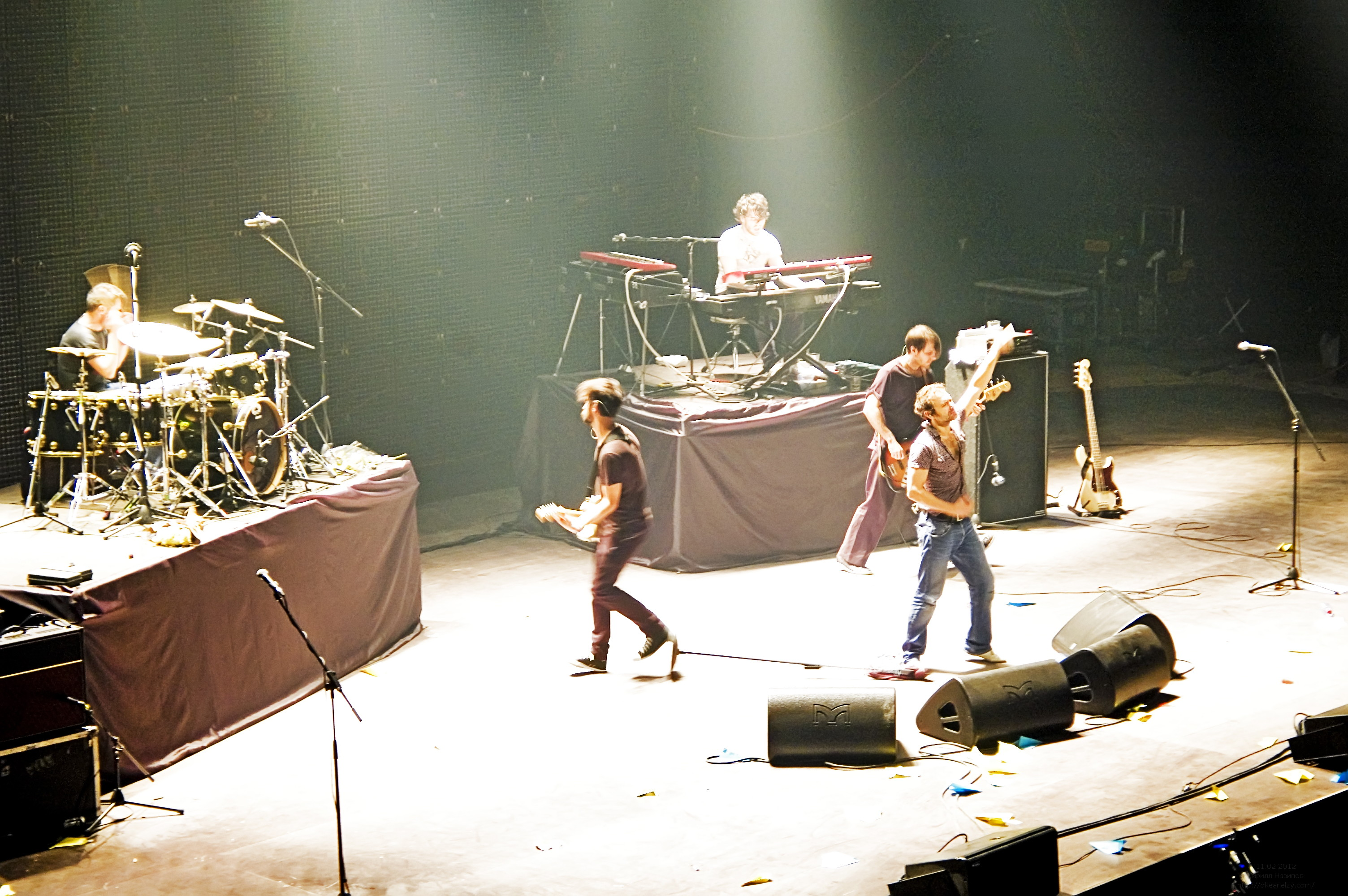
Okean Elzy

- Sofia Rotaru – released a number of Ukrainian language albums that were in top chart positions (Yedinomu)
- Okean Elzy – popular rock band
- Ruslana – singer, composer, pianist, conductor - Won the Eurovision Song contest for Ukraine in 2004
- Verka Serduchka – singer
- Svetlana Loboda – singer
- VIA GRA
- nikitA
- neAngely
- Potap & Kamenskikh
- Vremya i Steklo
- Ani Lorak
- Anyuta Slavskaya
- Natalka Karpa
- Natalia Mohylevska (Nataliya Mogilevskaya)
- Zlata Ognevich – singer – represented Ukraine at the Eurovision Song Contest 2013 and participated in the Ukrainian national selections in 2010, 2011, 2012 and 2013.
- Anastasia Prikhodko – singer – represented Russia at the Eurovision Song Contest 2009 and participated in the Ukrainian national selection in 2009, 2011 and 2016.

Ukrainian pop and folk music rose in popularity around the world with groups like Vopli Vidoplyasova, Viy and Okean Elzy.

The group Kazaky became one of Ukraine's first outfits to achieve a degree of international recognition only weeks after its constitution in 2010 by relying on the impact of its video through the internet.

=== 2010s ===
Despite the deteriorated relations between Ukraine and Russia in 2016, new Ukrainian bands achieved Russian charts success. The wave of Ukrainian artists making Russian chart success has been labeled "UkrPop". Since the 2014 Russian annexation of Crimea, Okean Elzy and BoomBox stopped performing in Russia, but they were one of the few Ukrainian artists to do so. Most tried to avoid making political statements and continued to perform in Russia. Ukrainian artists and bands with rising success in the 2010s include Maruv, Kazka and The Hardkiss.

In 2016, Ukraine won the Eurovision Song Contest for the second time, this time with Jamala's song 1944, which was partly sung in Crimean Tatar.

On 8 November 2018, a law came into force that mandated Ukrainian radio stations to broadcast no less than 35% of songs in Ukrainian. If 60% of songs are played in the official languages of the European Union, then 25% is the minimum.

== Styles ==
=== Russian pop music in Ukraine ===
Russian pop (Russian: Русская попса, Russkaya popsa; Russian: Русская эстрада, Russkaya estrada) has arguably been the leading music style in Ukraine, post-Soviet countries and Russian diaspora. Ukraine has the biggest Russian diaspora (see Russians in Ukraine). In the Soviet Union, Ukraine used to produce up to half of all Russian speaking pop singers in the World. Among the biggest music promoters in Ukraine is Filip Kirkorov and Arkadiy Ukupnik.

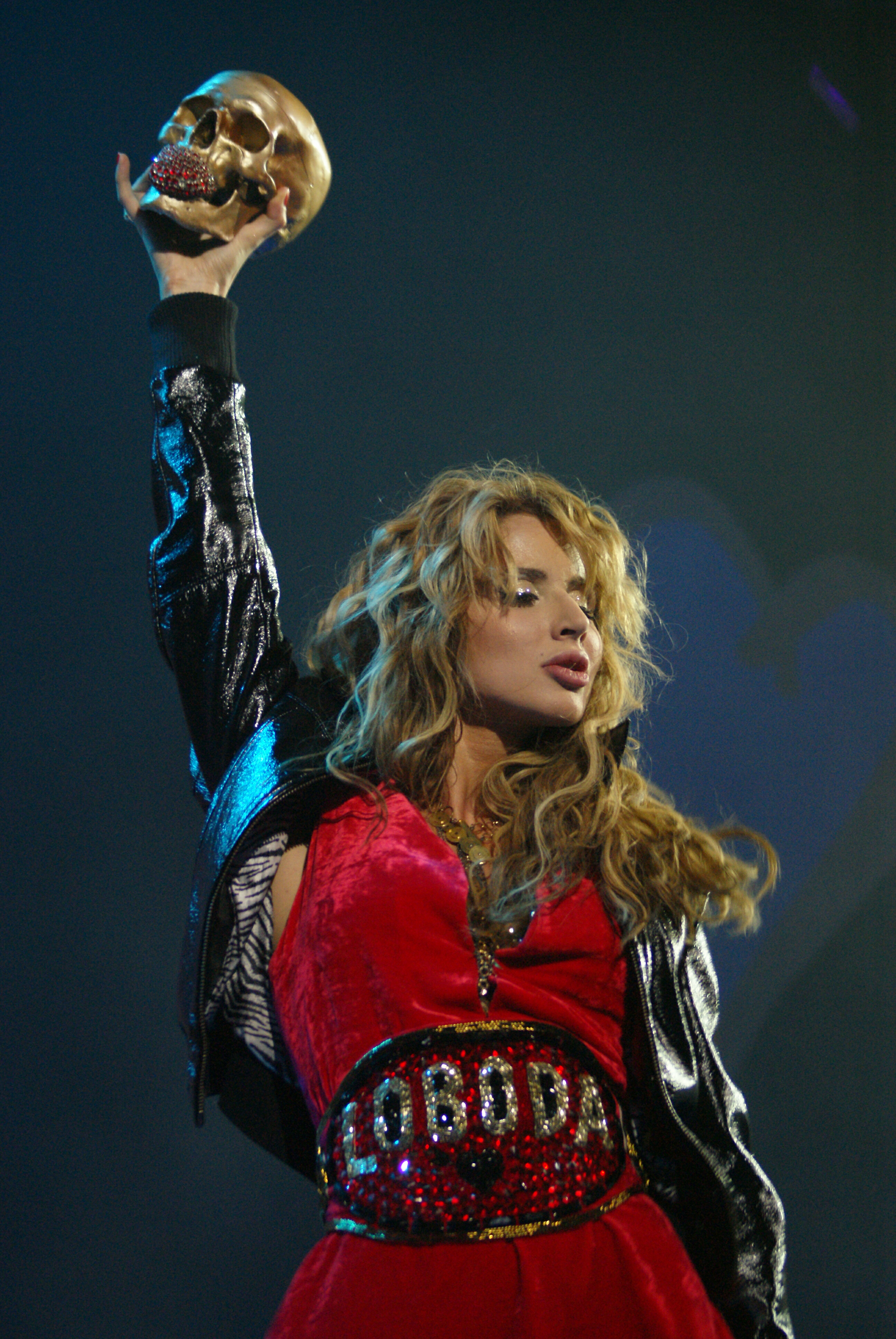
Svetlana Loboda representing Ukraine at the Eurovision Song Contest 2009

Many singers in Ukraine sing in both Russian and Ukrainian languages.

==== List of Russian speaking singers ====
- Lolita Milyavskaya – Mukacheve, Zakarpattia Oblast
- Natasha Korolyova – Kyiv
- Vera Brezhneva – Dniprodzerzhynsk (Kamianske), Dnipropetrovsk Oblast
- Stas Kostyushkin – Odesa
- Anna Sedokova – Kyiv
- Anastasia Stotskaya – Kyiv
- Iosif Kobzon – Chasiv Yar, Donetsk Oblast
- Svetlana Loboda – Kyiv
- Tatiana Ovseyenko – Kyiv
- Lyudmila Senchina – village in Bratske Raion, Mykolaiv Oblast
- Anzhelika Varum – Lviv
- Potap – Kyiv
- Yolka – Uzhhorod

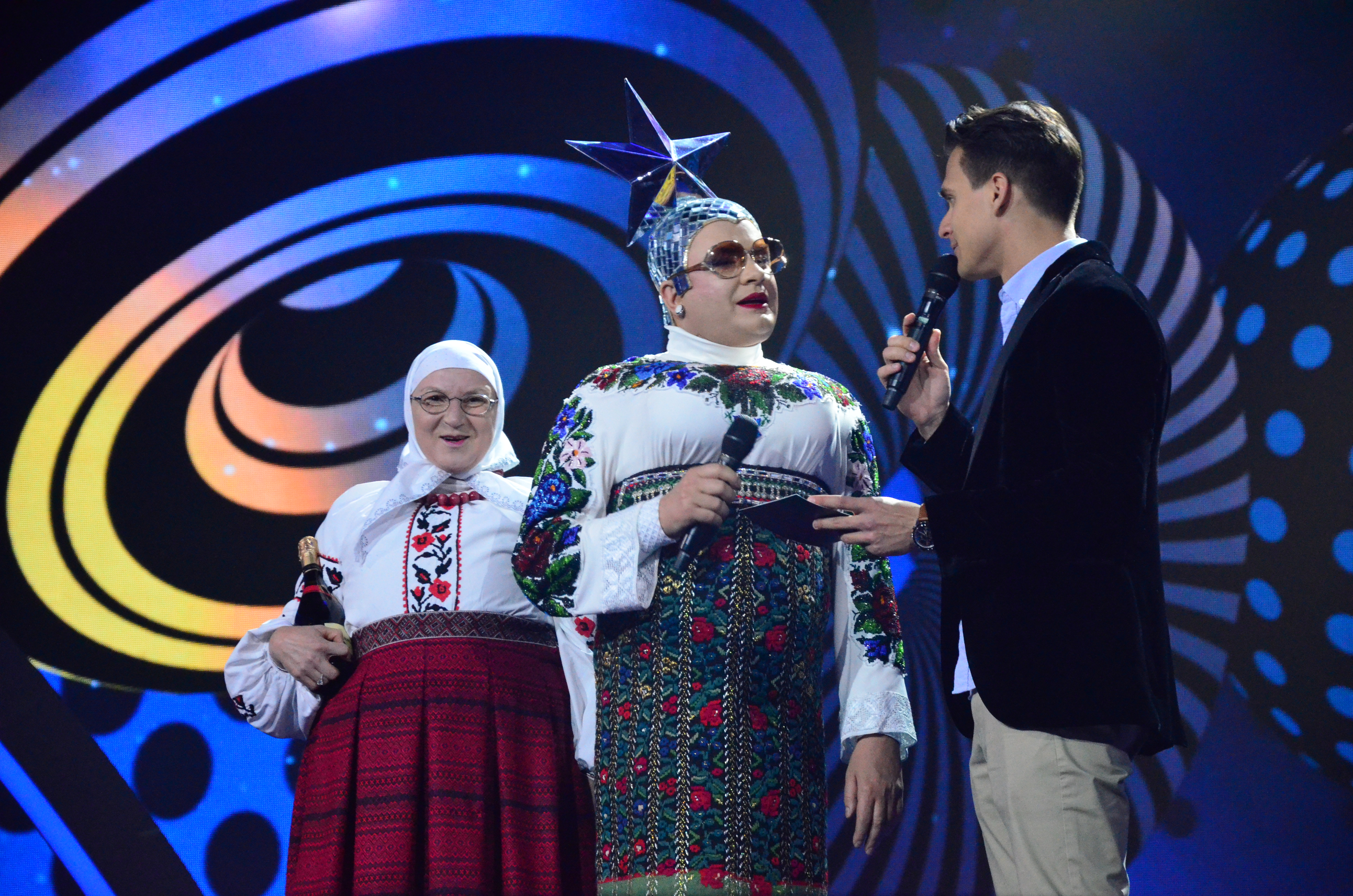
Verka Serduchka

==== List of singers in both languages ====
- Taisia Povaliy – village in Bila Tserkva Raion, Kyiv Oblast
- Ani Lorak – Kitsman, Chernivtsi Oblast
- Iryna Bilyk - Kyiv
- Monatik – Lutsk
- Melovin – Odesa
- Natalia Mogilevskaya – Kyiv
- NK – Kyiv (also sings in Spanish)
- Oleh Vynnyk – village in Cherkasy Raion, Cherkasy Oblast
- Olya Polyakova – Vinnytsia
- Sofia Rotaru – Chernivtsi Oblast
- Verka Serduchka – Poltava (sings many songs in Surzhyk)

=== Rock ===
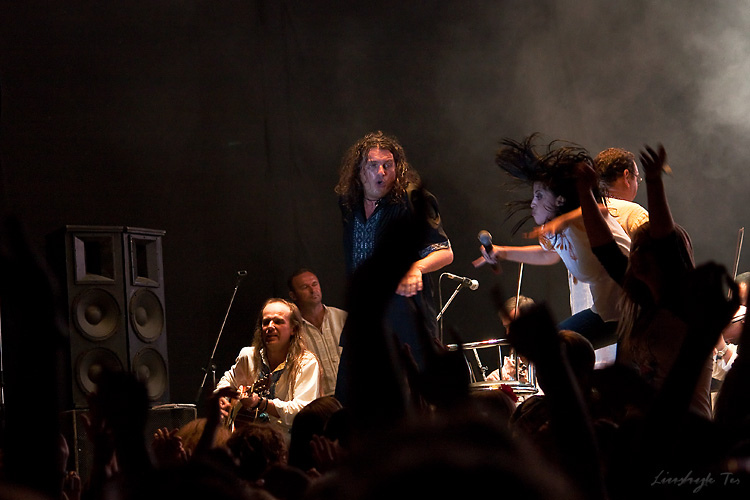
Skryabin performing in Lviv, 2011

Ukrainian rock bands include Braty Hadiukiny/Брати Гадюкіни, Komu Vnyz, Plach Yeremiyi/Плач Єремії, Taras Petrynenko, Viy, Vopli Vidoplyasova, Yurcash, Burning Hearts and others. Opalnyi Prynz/Opalni Prinz/Опальний Принц was, perhaps, the most influential Rock band in the late 80's. Okean Elzy, featuring Slava Vakarchuk has long been among the most popular bands of Ukrainian pop-rock, and has had some success abroad. The pop-singer Ruslana also uses some elements of rock in her work. The Hardkiss - one of the outstanding Ukrainian indie-bands. Interesting in rock music is Skryabin.

The Rock legends of Ukraine is a series of compilations of the best works of known Ukrainian rock groups.

New wave of rock music in Ukraine is represented by such bands as TOL, Skinhate (Hardcore), Flëur, Ya i Drug Moi Gruzovik, Snuff, Pictures Inside Me, Fakultet (New Metal), S.K.A.Y. (Pop rock), Marakesh (Alternative rock), Holy Blood (Folk metal), Kara, FACTOR 150 (Christian Metalcore), Robots Don't Cry (Punk rock), Opozitsiya, xDeviantx, E42, The Homebodies, Jinjer (Metalcore / Prog Metal), etc.

=== Black Metal ===
Influenced by their Norwegian counterparts, Black Metal bands include Nokturnal Mortum, Lucifugum, Drudkh, Hate Forest, Astrofaes, Holy Blood, Blood of Kingu, Raventale, Lutomysl, Dub Buk, and IGNEA.

=== A Cappella vocal groups ===
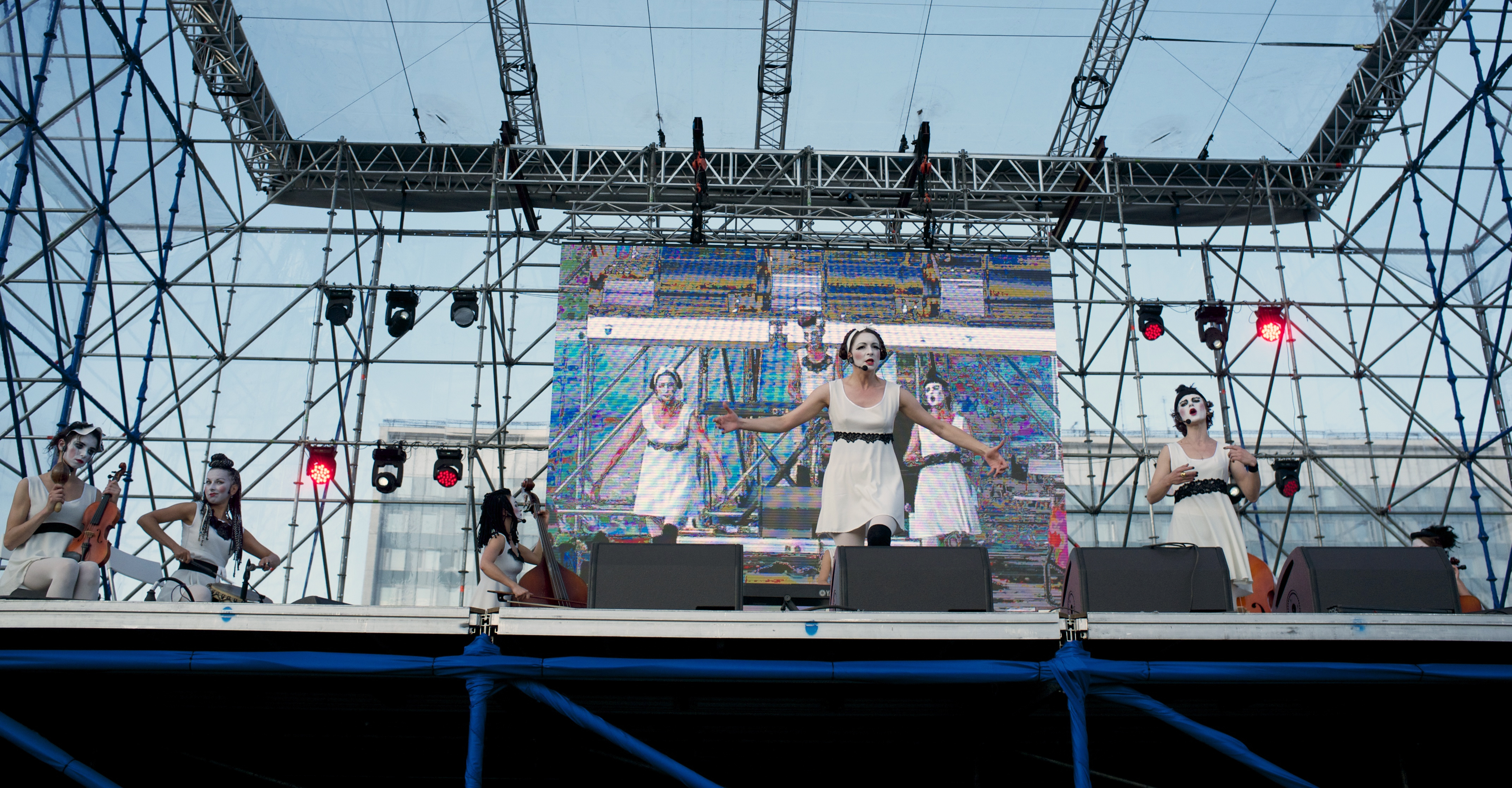
DakhDaughters musical band performing in the genre "freak-cabaret" and theatrical performances.

Pikardiyska Tertsiya, Mensound

=== Singer-songwriter ===
Viktor Morozov, Andriy Panchyshyn, Eduard Drach. Yurcash.

=== Fusion groups ===
The band Mandry is known for fusing traditional Ukrainian music with rock, blues, reggae and chansons.

=== Hip-hop ===
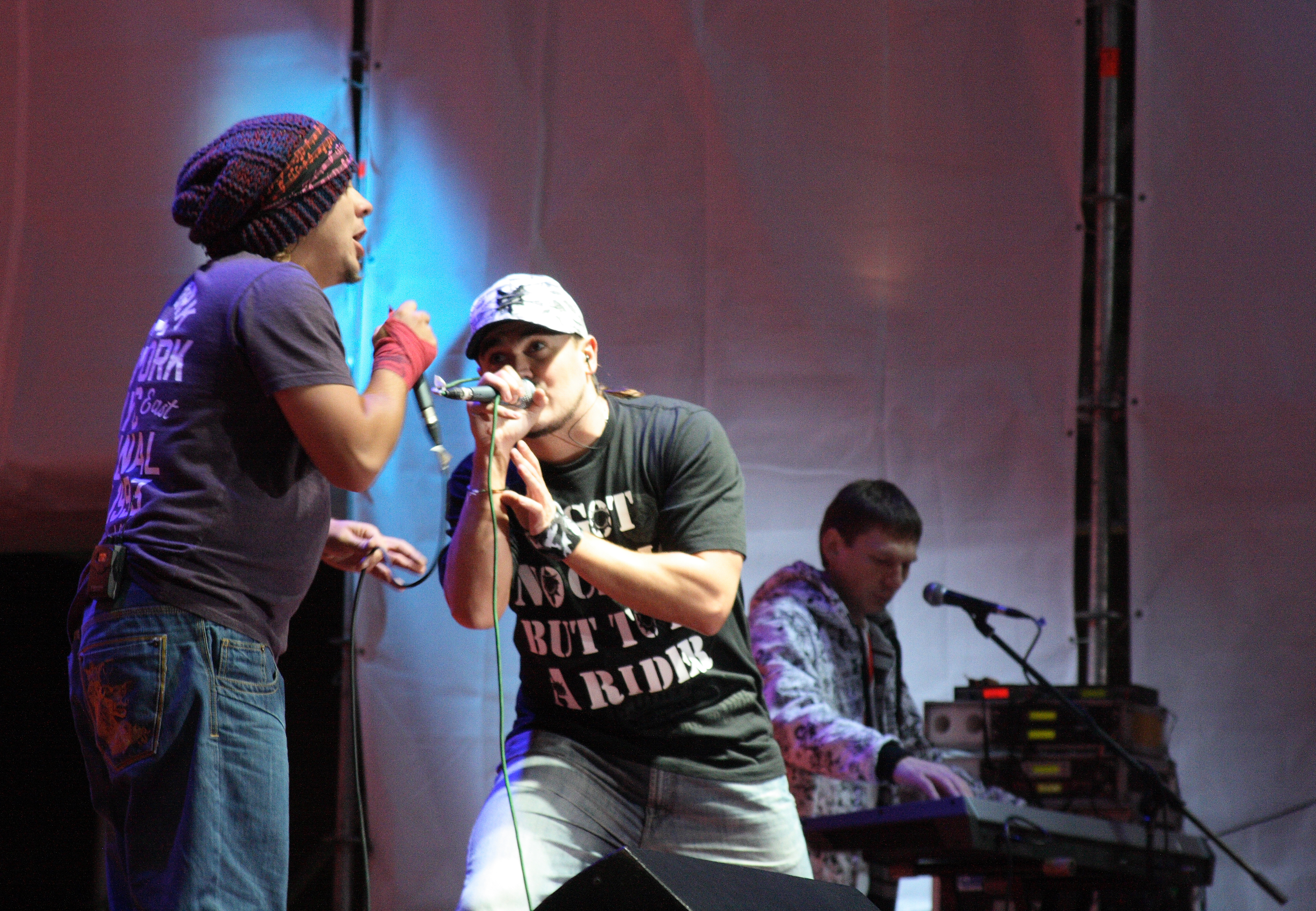
TNMK

One of the prominent groups is Tanok Na Maydani Kongo ("The Dance on the Congo Square") which raps in the Ukrainian language (specifically the Slobozhanshchyna dialect) and mixes hip hop with indigenous Ukrainian elements. Most Hip-hop in Ukraine is however in Russian.

Ukraine's 2005 entry in the Eurovision Song Contest, GreenJolly's "Together We Are Many", had recently been the unofficial anthem of the Orange Revolution. Eurovision required the lyrics be changed for the contest version because of rules against political content.

Recently a new artist named Vova zi Lvova (literally "Vova (Volodymyr) from Lviv"), part of a collective known as Chorne ta Bile ("Black and White"), has entered onto the Ukrainian hip hop scene, gaining attention not only because of his serious lyrics (compared to groups such as TNMK, which frequently sing humorous or joke songs) but also because of his unique usage of the Ukrainian language in his lyrics.

== Popular performers in Ukraine ==
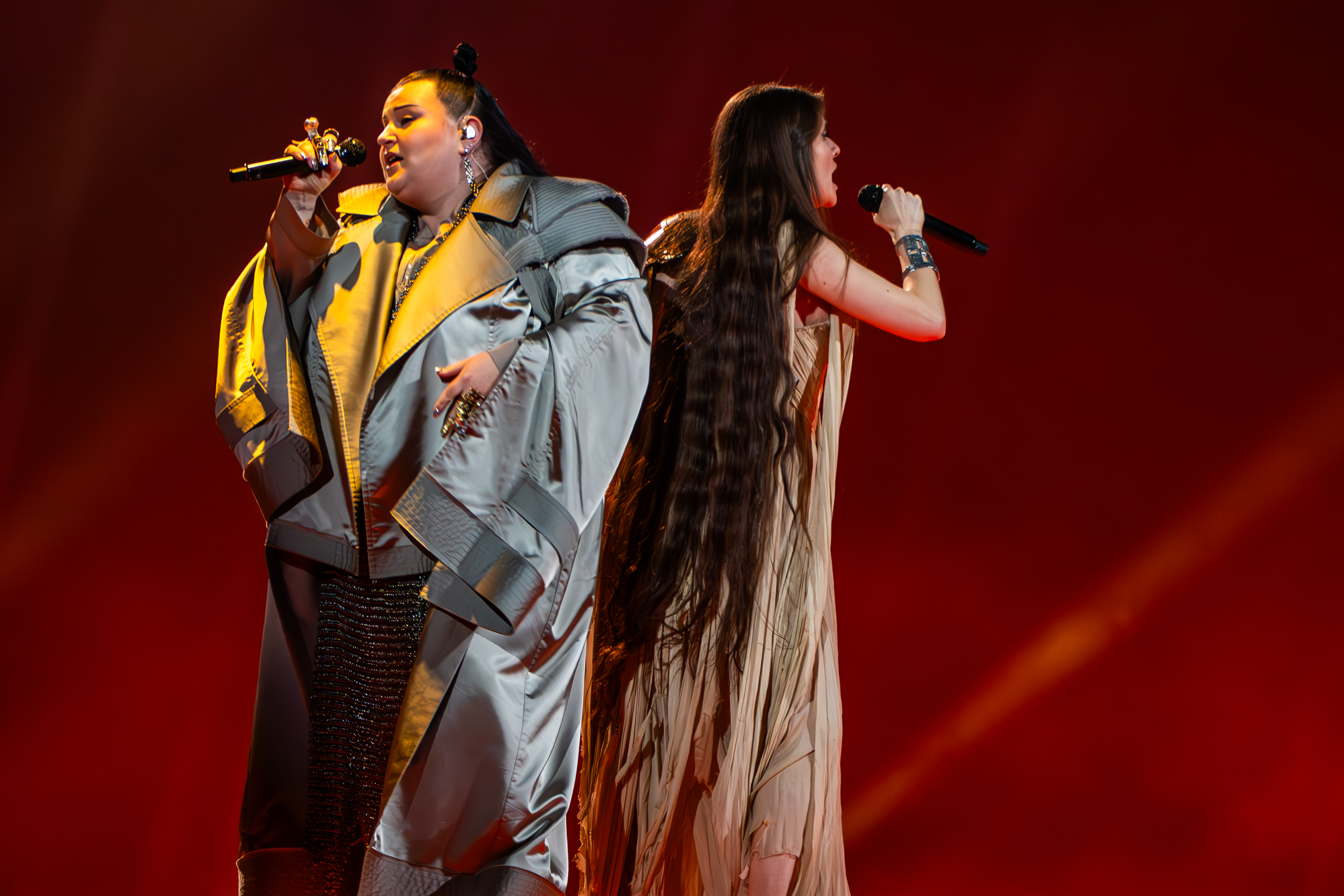
Alyona Alyona and Jerry Heil at the Eurovision Song Contest 2024

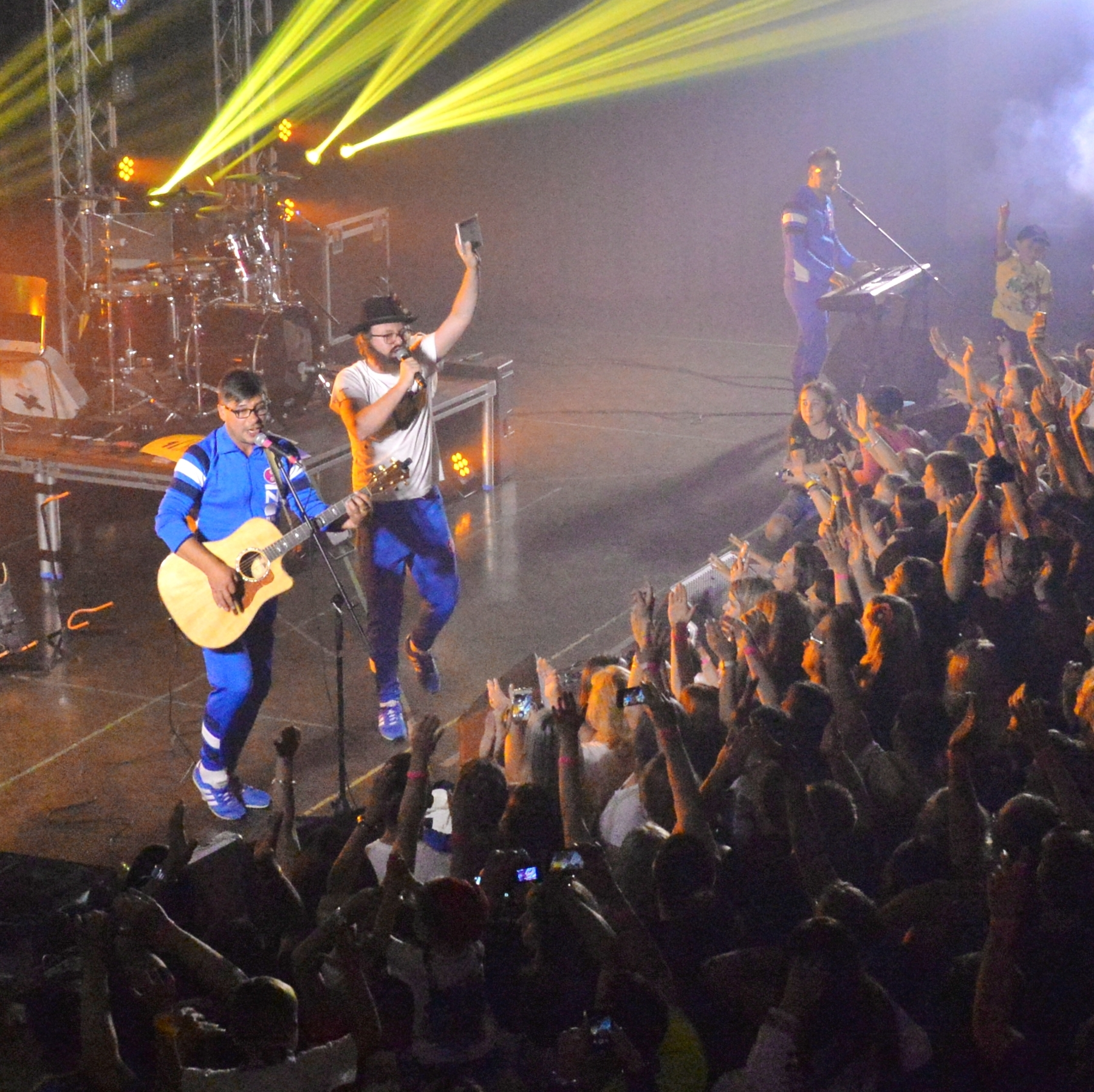
Dzidzio performing in Toronto, 2015

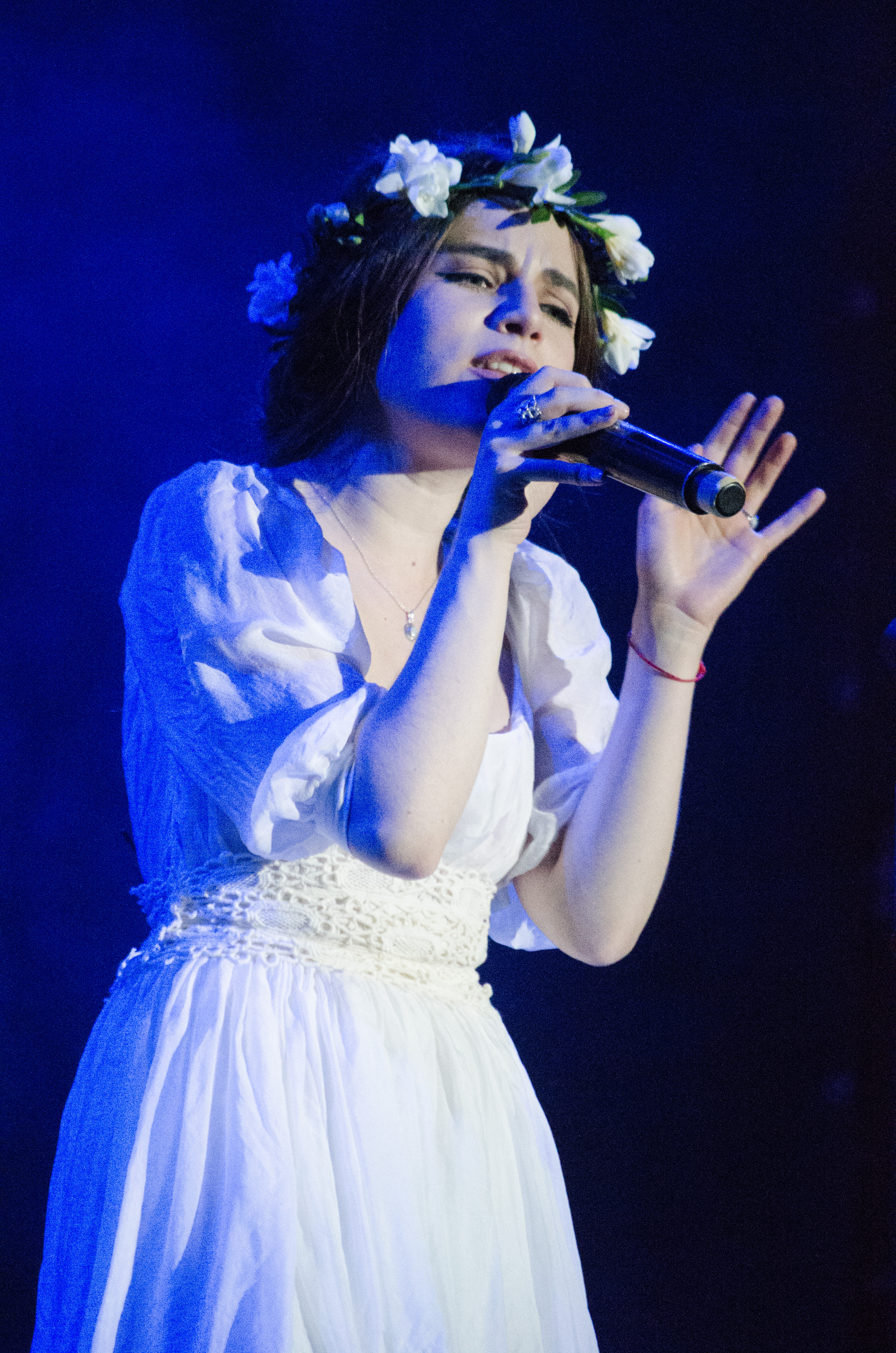
Khrystyna Soloviy singing during Atlas Weekend 2016

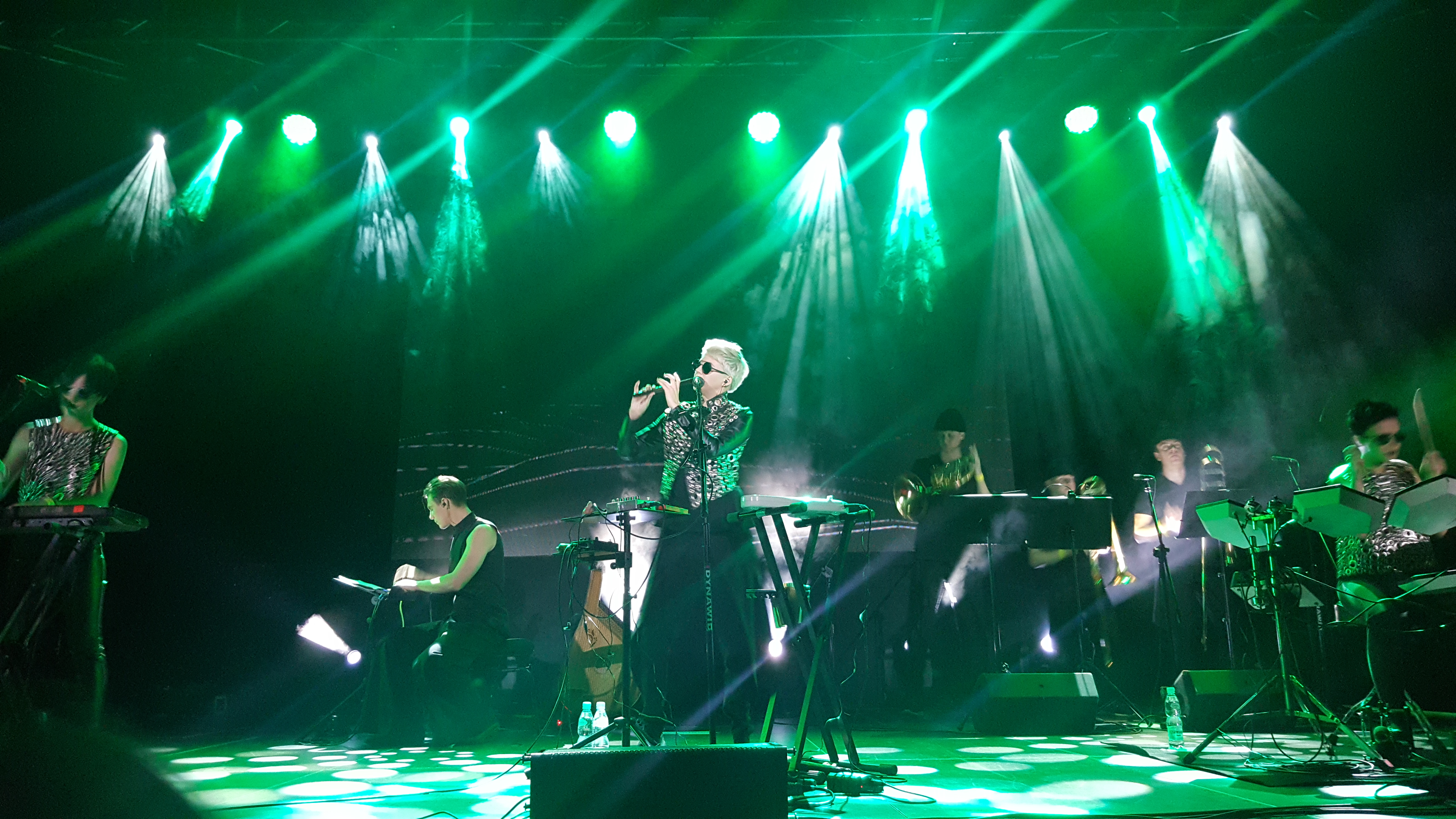
ONUKA performing in Warsaw, 2017

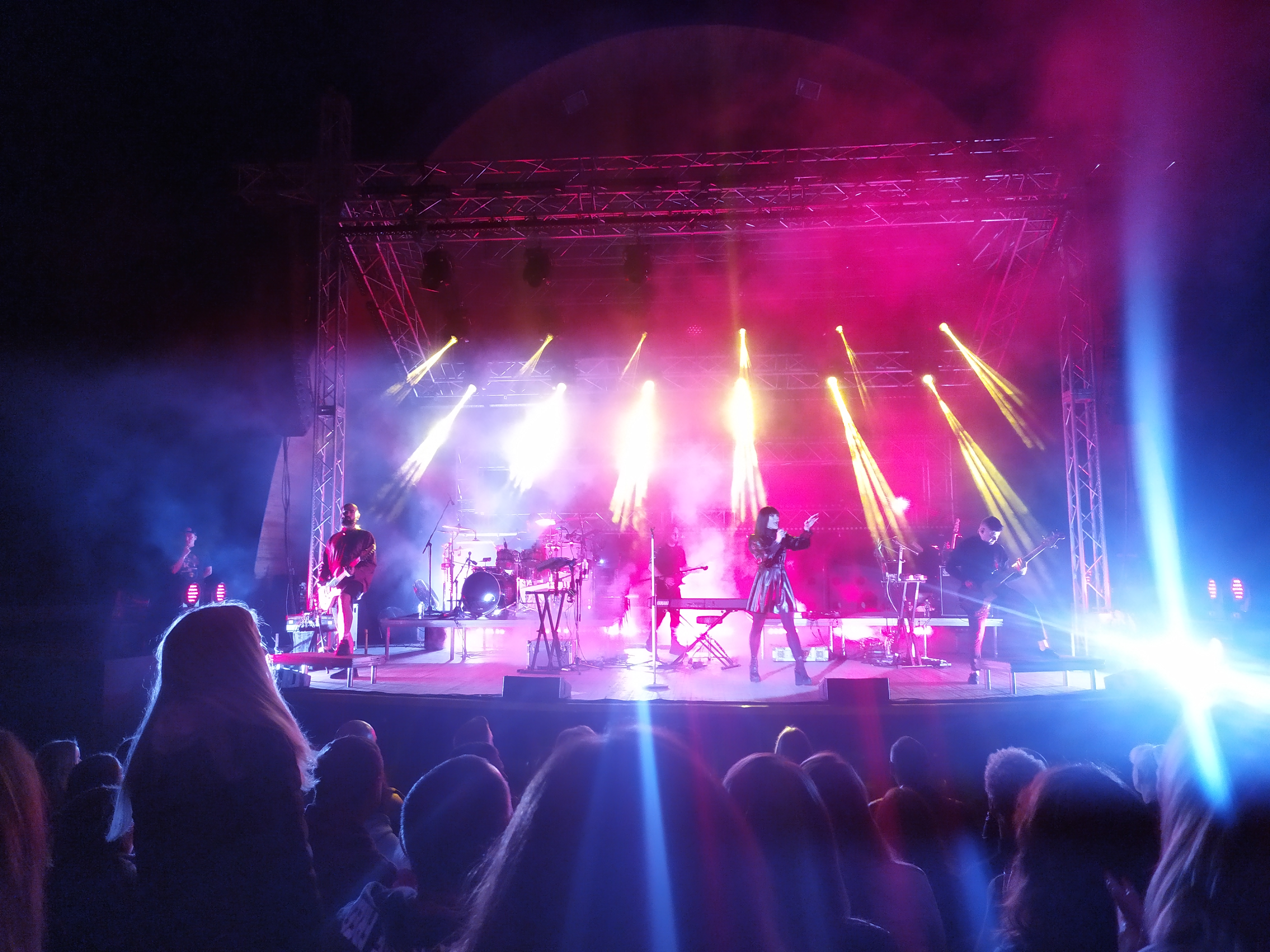
The Hardkiss concert in Zhytomyr, 2021

- Alekseev - pop (laureate of YUNA-2015, M1 Music Awards 2016)
- Alina Pash - hip hop, folk, ethno, pop (laureate of YUNA-2018 and 2019)
- Alyona Alyona - hip hop (laureate of YUNA-2019 and 2020)
- Andriy Khlyvnyuk - funk, rock (laureate of YUNA-2016 and 2022)
- Antytila - pop rock (laureates of YUNA-2019, 2022 and 2023)
- Alyosha - (laureate of YUNA-2012, M1 Music Awards 2017)
- Ani Lorak - pop (laureate of YUNA-2013)
- Artem Pyvovarov - pop, new wave (laureate of YUNA-2020, 2021 and 2023)
- Bez Obmezhen' - rock (laureates of YUNA-2022, M1 Music Awards 2019)
- BoomBox - rock, funk, hip-hop, reggae (laureates of YUNA-2012, 2021 and 2022)
- DakhaBrakha – folk music (laureates of YUNA-2016, 2019 and 2020)
- Dakooka - electronic music (laureate of YUNA-2021)
- Dmytro Shurov - soul, blues, pop (laureate of YUNA-2015 and 2017 (as Pianoboy)
- Dzidzio - folk-pop (laureats of M1 Music Awards 2015)
- Eva Bushmina - pop (laureate of YUNA-2013)
- Go A - folktronica, folk rock (laureates of YUNA-2021)
- Griby - hip house (laureates of YUNA-2016 and 2017)
- Iryna Bilyk - pop (laureate of YUNA-2011 and 2021)
- Iryna Fedyshyn - folk pop
- Ivan Dorn - indie pop (laureate of YUNA-2012, 2013 and 2014, M1 Music Awards 2015)
- Jamala - funk, soul, folk-pop, electro (laureate of YUNA-2015, 2016, 2018 and 2023)
- Jerry Heil - pop (laureate of YUNA-2019)
- Julia Sanina - pop, rock (laureate of YUNA-2020)
- Kalush - hip hop (laureates of YUNA-2020 and 2021)
- Kazka - folk-pop (laureates of YUNA-2017 and 2018, M1 Music Awards 2018)
- Khrystyna Soloviy - folk-pop (laureate of YUNA-2015)
- Klavdia Petrivna - pop (laureate of YUNA-2023)
- Kola - pop (laureate of YUNA-2022 and 2023)
- Luna - electropop (laureate of YUNA-2019)
- Mandry - folk-rock
- Maruv - electro-pop (laureate of YUNA-2018 and 2019, M1 Music Awards 2018)
- Max Barskih - dance-pop (laureate of YUNA-2022, M1 Music Awards 2015 and 2017)
- Mélovin - electro-pop (laureate of M1 Music Awards 2019)
- Michelle Andrade - pop (laureate of M1 Music Awards 2017 and 2018)
- Monatik - pop (laureate of YUNA-2016, 2017, 2018, 2019, 2020 and 2021, M1 Music Awards 2015, 2016, 2017, 2018 and 2019)
- Mozgi - EDM (laureates of M1 Music Awards 2015 and 2017)
- Mykhailo Poplavskyi - estrada, folk
- Nadia Dorofeeva - pop (laureate of YUNA-2018, M1 Music Awards 2018)
- Nadia Meiher - pop (laureate of YUNA-2021)
- Nastya Kamenskikh - pop, R&B (laureate of YUNA-2018, 2019 and 2021, M1 Music Awards 2015, 2016, 2017, 2018 and 2019)
- Okean Elzy - pop rock (laureates of YUNA-2011, 2013, 2014, 2015, 2016 and 2022)
- Oleh Vynnyk - pop (laureate of YUNA-2021, M1 Music Awards 2018)
- Oleksandr Ponomariov - pop (laureate of YUNA-2011, M1 Music Awards 2018)
- Olya Polyakova - pop (laureate of YUNA-2019, M1 Music Awards 2017)
- Omnia - EDM (laureate of M1 Music Awards 2015)
- ONUKA - folktronica, synth-pop (laureates of YUNA-2014)
- Plach Yeremiyi – rock music
- Potap - pop-rap (laureate of YUNA-2021, M1 Music Awards 2015, 2016 and 2017)
- Quest Pistols - pop (laureates of M1 Music Awards 2015)
- Ruslana - pop rock, folk
- Sasha Chemerov - grunge, punk rock (laureate of YUNA-2021)
- SadSvit - post punk
- Serhiy Babkin - reggae, jazz, rock
- Skofka - rap (laureate of YUNA-2022)
- Skryabin - synth-pop, new wave, alternative rock (laureates of YUNA-2013 and 2014)
- Svetlana Loboda - pop (laureate of YUNA-2013, 2014 and 2017, M1 Music Awards 2015 and 2016)
- Svitlana Tarabarova - pop
- Taisia Povaliy - pop, estrada
- Tayanna - folk rock (laureate of M1 Music Awards 2017)
- The Hardkiss – progressive pop, alternative rock (laureates of YUNA-2012, 2014, 2016, 2017, 2018, 2020 and 2021, M1 Music Awards 2016, 2017 and 2018)
- Time and Glass (Vremya I Steklo) - electro-hop (laureates of YUNA-2015, 2016, 2017 and 2019, M1 Music Awards 2015, 2016, 2017, 2018 and 2019)
- Tina Karol - pop (laureate of YUNA-2013, 2014, 2017 and 2020, M1 Music Awards 2015, 2017 and 2019)
- TNMK (Tanko na Maydani Kongo) - hip hop (laureates of YUNA-2020)

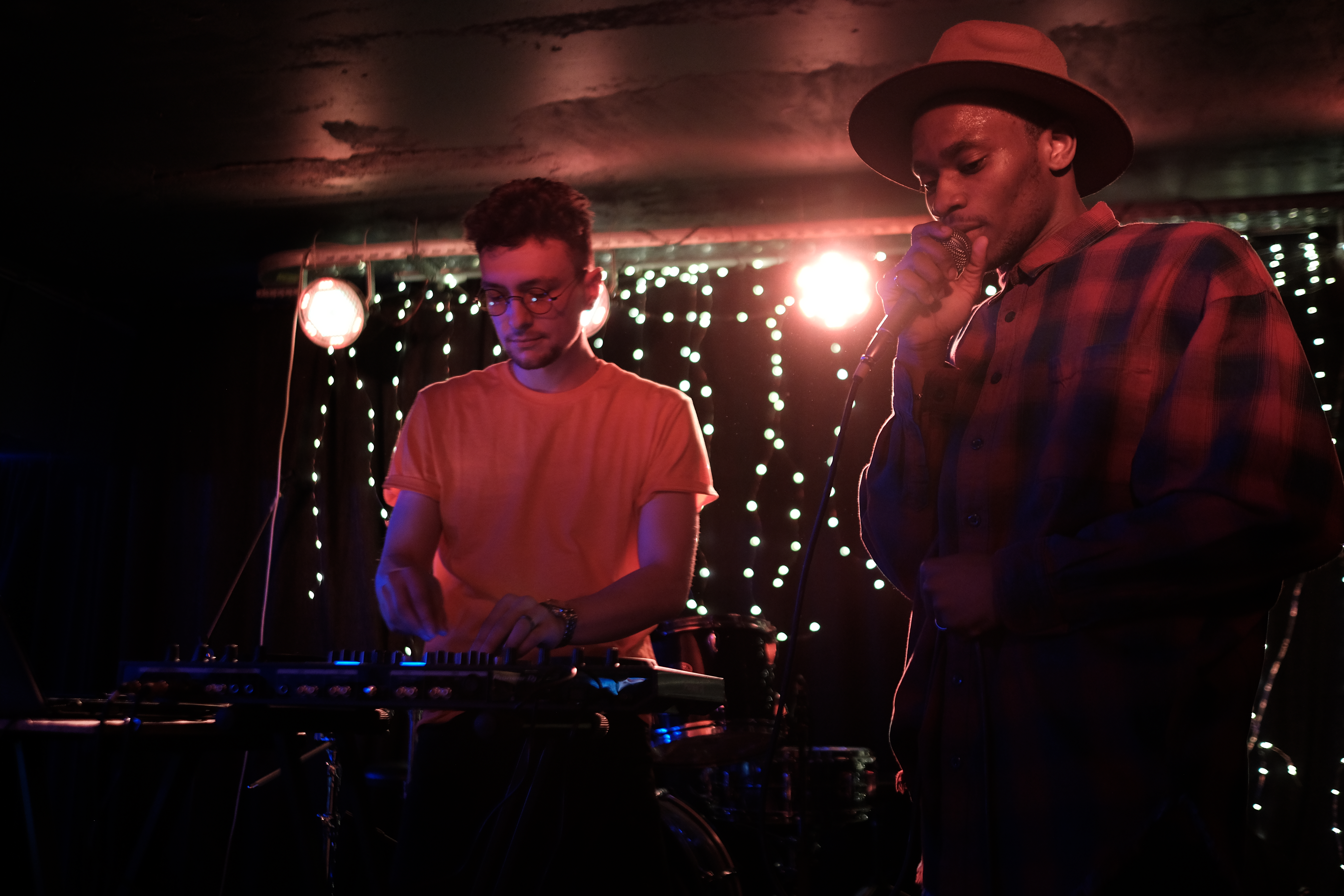
Tvorchi

- Tvorchi - electronic music (laureates of YUNA-2020 and 2021)
- Verka Serduchka - folk-pop, novelty (laureate of YUNA-2020)
- Viy – folk-rock
- VV (Vopli Vidoplyasova) – folk-rock (laureates of YUNA-2011)
- Wellboy - pop (laureate of YUNA-2021)
- Yolka - pop (laureate of YUNA-2012)
- Yurcash – Ukrainian folk-rock, ska, punk
- Zlata Ognevich - pop (laureate of YUNA-2023)

== Music of the Ukrainian Diaspora ==
=== Canada ===
Pop music in the Ukrainian diaspora took off in the mid sixties in Western Canada with cover recordings by the Drifters 5 of Beatles tunes. They were followed by performers such as Mikey and Bunny. In the 1970s Montreal positioned itself as a major centre for Ukrainian Diaspora pop music mainly through the efforts of Bohdan Tymyc and his Yevshan corporation. Yevshan released numerous recordings by Zabava bands such as Ukrainian-Canadian bands Rushnychok and Syny Stepiv. It is through Yevshan that Luba Kovalchuk recorded her first recordings and started her rise through an album called Zoria (Album cover by Maurice Prokaziuk).

=== United States ===
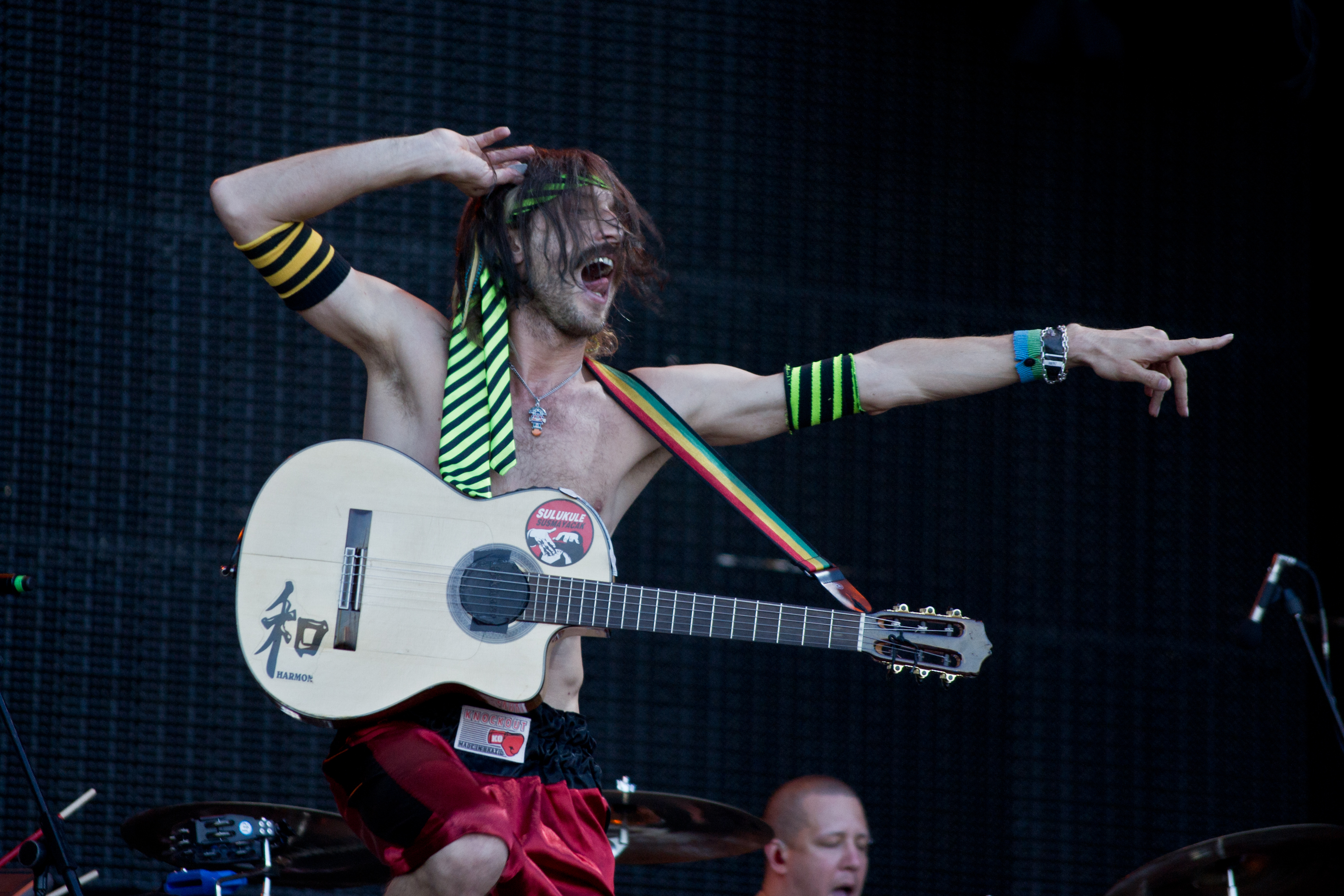
Gogol Bordello

Eugene Hutz of Gogol Bordello mixes traditional Roma music of Ukraine with punk, ska, and jazz.

=== Other ===
Other musicians of the Ukrainian diaspora include:

- Kacey Cisyk – soprano
- George Hrab – musician and podcaster
- Julian Kytasty – singer, composer, kobzar, bandurist (folk genre)
- Victor Mishalow – composer, kobzar, bandurist (classical/folk genre)
- Mariana Sadovska – singer, composer

== Ukrainian labels ==
- Atlantic music (1991)
- Audio Ukraina (1991)
- Zone records (1996)
- Moon records (1997)
- Rostok records (1997)
- Nova records (1997–2001)
- JRC (Joint Recording Company, 1998)
- Lavina music (2001)
- Empire Label (2007–2010)
- Mozgi Entertainment (2010)

== See also ==
- Music of Ukraine
- Ukrainian hip hop
- Rock music in Ukraine
- Ukrainian metal
- Ukrainian folk music
