= Sons of the Steppes =

Ukrainian-Canadian vocal and instrumental ensemble

Sons of the Steppes (Ukrainian: Сини степів, romanized: Syny Stepiv), a Canadian–Ukrainian pop band from Montreal, Canada, performed in the 1970s and early 1980s. Like the popular Canadian band Rushnychok at the time, the quartet used a set of instruments and a combination of rock and folk music, jazz and other styles. The band's repertoire included Ukrainian folk songs and (at that time) modern songs in their own arrangement, as well as their own songs. The band's first album made "Sons of the Steppes" popular throughout the North American continent. All three of their albums were quite successful and popular not only in Canada and the US, but also in Europe and Soviet Ukraine (where they were distributed illegally through tape recordings).

Musicians performed on stages decorated with traditional Ukrainian motifs, in traditional Ukrainian folk costume. The musicians themselves possessed a diverse number of instruments and repeatedly joined other bands directly during performances. At the peak of their popularity, Sons of the Steppes performed many performances, concerts and shows.

At the beginning of the 1980s, the ensemble ceased its activities, three of its members organized a new band "Вечірній дзвін" (Evening Bell)".

== Band members ==
- Тарас Дідусь (Taras Didus) – accordion, vocals
- Тіно Папа (Tino Papa) – drums
- Адріан Альбощий (Adrian Alboschy) – guitar, vocals (album II and III)
- Ярослав Воркевич (Yaroslav Vorkevych) — guitar, vocals (albums I and II)
- Ярослав Гудзьо (Yaroslav Gudzo) – guitar, vocals (albums I and III)

== Discography ==
=== Сини степів I (Sons of the steppes I) ===
1974, DUMY Productions – DU 7406 (LP)

1. Черевички (Boots)
2. Ганю, моя Ганю (Ganyu, my Ganyu)
3. Галичаночка (Halychanochka) (Yu. Vovk – M. Krasiuk)
4. А калина (A viburnum)
5. Понад Прутом (Over the Prut) (D. Tsygankov – M. Khromey)
6. Під вишнею (Under the cherry tree) (T. Didus)
7. З сиром пироги (Pies with cheese)
8. У вишневому садочку (In the cherry orchard)
9. Чекання (Waiting) (P. Protsko-O. Bohachuk)
10. Встиду ти не маєш (You have no shame) (T. Didus)
11. Лебеді материнства (Swans of motherhood) (A. Pashkevich – V. Symonenko)
12. Нині (Currently)

=== Сини степів II (Sons of the Steppes II) ===
1975, Yevshan Records – YFP 1001 (LP)

1. Чи це тая криниченка (Is it that Krynychenka) (words – folk, music – T. Didus)
2. Ой там в полі жито (Oh, there's rye in the field) (words – folk, music – T. Didus)
3. Прощання (Farewell) (words – T. Didus, music – T. Didus)
4. Чи були ви у нас на Десні (Have you been with us at Desna) (words by Ye. Ulytskyi, music by V. Nesterenko)
5. Раз у похід козак собирався (Once a Cossack gathered for a campaign) (words – folk, music – T. Didus)
6. Рідна мова (Native language) (words – folk, music – T. Didus)
7. Я люблю (I love) (words by P. Voronko, music by B. Vesolovsky)
8. Тай орав мужик (Tai plowed a man) (words are folk, music is folk)
9. Віра, Віра (Faith, Faith) (words – S. Kovalevsky, music – V. Kondratovych)
10. Зіронька (Zironka) (words by O. Galabutskyi, music by Ya. Tseglyar)
11. Час додому (Time to go home) (words – folk, music – T. Didus)

=== Сини степів III (Sons of the Steppes III) ===
1977, Yevshan Records – YFP 1006 (LP)

1. Не жонатий ходжу (Unmarried Khoju) (folk)
2. За нашим явором (Behind our sycamore) (Lemki folk)
3. Не співайте мені (Don't sing to me) (words – L. Ukrainka, music – T. Didus)
4. Зачарована Десна (Enchanted Desna) (words by D. Lutsenko, music by I. Shamo, prelude by Ya. Gudzo)
5. Ой на ставі (Oh on the pond) (folk)
6. Без тебе, Олесю (Without you, Olesya) (words – folk, music – T. Didus)
7. Позволь мені мати (Let me have) (folk)
8. Сиджу я край віконечка (I'm sitting by the window) (folk)
9. В горах живе Марійка (Mariyka lives in the mountains) (words by R. Savytskyi, music by Ya. Gudzo)
10. У милого очі сині (The cute one has blue eyes) (words by O. Strelets, music by D. Tsygankov)
11. Пісня про Надвірну (Song about Nadvirna) (music by P. Terpeliuk)

== See also ==
- uk:Сини степів
- Ukrainian folk music
- Ukrainian Canadians
