= Yurcash =

Ukrainian folk punk rock band

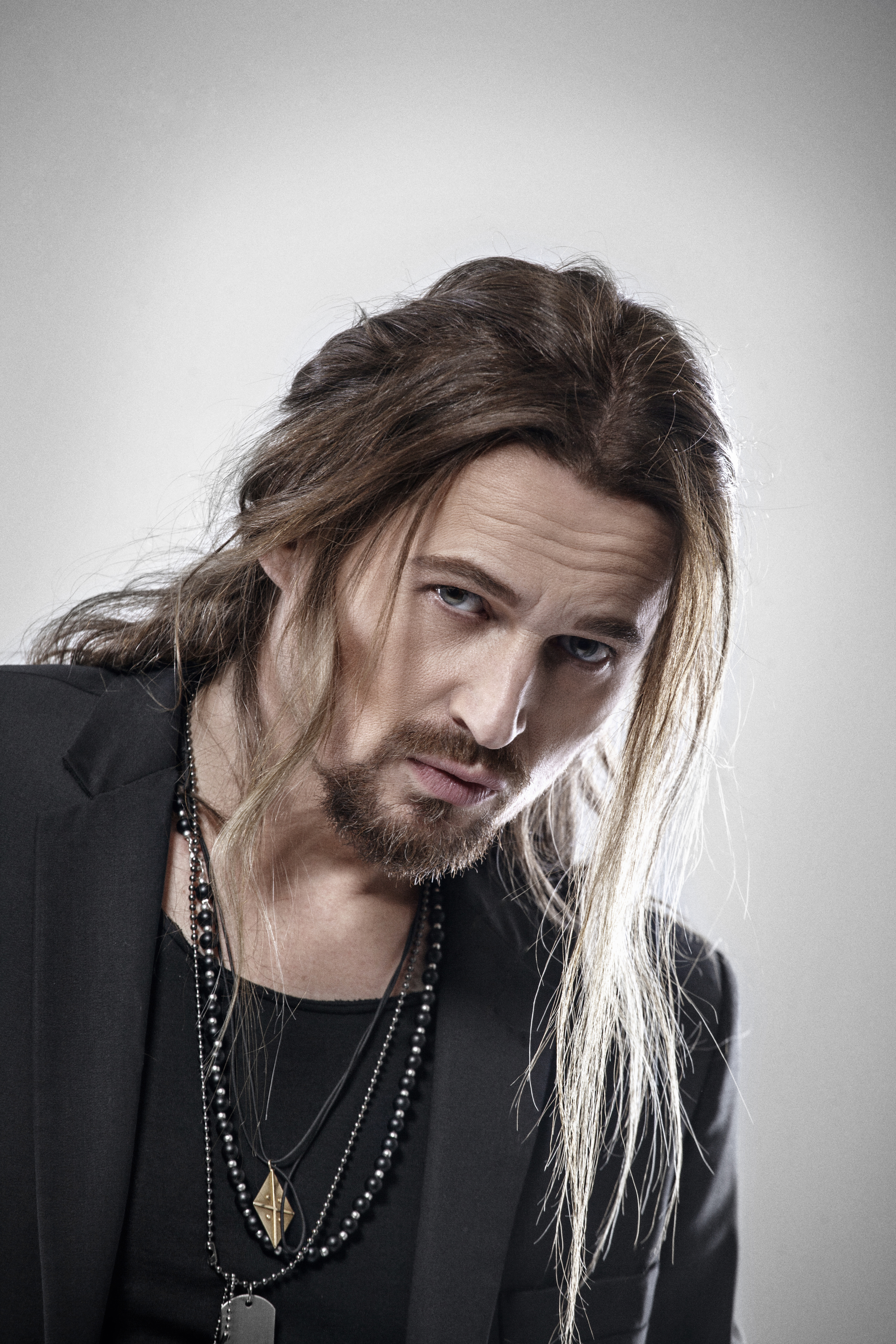

Background information
- Also known as: Yurkesh (Юркеш)
- Origin: Kyiv, Ukraine
- Genres: Punk rock, folk punk, rock
- Years active: 2004–present
- Members: Yurii "Yurkesh" Yurchenko – vocals, bayan, accordion, keyboards, acoustic guitar; George "Joe" Yurchenko – bass guitar; Valerii "Overko" Kolomiiets – keyboards; Yurii "RAFF" Zakharchuk – drums
- Past members: Yurii "Kondrat" Kondratiuk – guitar; Artur "Archibald" Makeiev – bass guitar

Yurcash (also Yurkesh; Юркеш) is a Ukrainian folk punk rock band formed in Kyiv in 2004 by singer Yurko Yurchenko. The band’s ideological basis is described as “friendly and welcoming punk”, and the musicians characterise their style as “intelligent–intellectual punk rock with elements” of many other genres. Yurcash reached a wide television audience as superfinalists of the eighth season of the Ukrainian TV talent show X-Factor in 2017, finishing second, and later participated in Ukraine’s national selection for the Eurovision Song Contest 2018.

== History ==
=== Formation (1990s–2004) ===
Yurchenko began his musical career in the 1980s and 1990s in various rock bands before achieving pop success in Ukraine as “Yurko Yurchenko”, particularly among young audiences in the mid‑1990s. After working in Moscow in the early 2000s, he decided to abandon his former pop image and repertoire and, on returning to Ukraine in late 2004, created and led the band Yurkesh.

The band’s first performance took place as part of the all‑Ukrainian qualifying competition for the Eurovision 2005 on the UT‑1 television channel. Yurchenko has referred to the band’s concept as “intellectual punk rock with elements of humour and satire”, contrasting it with his earlier mainstream pop work.

=== Early releases and festival appearances (2005–2010) ===
Yurcash gained popularity with the football‑themed song "Mundial", released to coincide with the Ukrainian national team’s debut at the 2006 FIFA World Cup. In 2006 the band released their debut album Oi, which mixed punk‑rock energy with folk motifs and satirical lyrics.

In 2007 Yurcash issued a second album, Menuety. Tiulpany v tselofani ("Menuets. Tulips in Cellophane"), further developing their blend of rock, chanson parody and theatrical performance. Press profiles note the band’s participation in youth and rock festivals during this period, where their humorous and often absurdist songs distinguished them from other acts.

=== Songwriting for other artists ===
Alongside his work with Yurcash, Yurchenko wrote songs for numerous pop and rock performers, including Philipp Kirkorov, NeAngely, Andrii Danylko (Verka Serdiuchka), Lolita, Olha Yunakova, Maryna Odolska, Mariia Yaremchuk and others. In 2013 his song "Ya" ("I"), performed by Russian singer Lolita, was recognised in Russian music award shows such as "Golden Gramophone" and "Pesnia goda".

=== 2010s: 100 Seconds of Spring, X-Factor and Eurovision ===
In 2016, to mark the 20th anniversary of his artistic career, Yurchenko released the single and music video "100 sekund vesny" ("100 Seconds of Spring") under the Yurkesh brand. He also wrote songs such as "Monster Song" and "I Love You" for the Kyiv stage show Dim taiemnychykh pryhod ("The House of Mysterious Adventures").

Yurcash returned to national prominence in 2017 as contestants on the eighth season of the television talent show X-Factor on STB, where they reached the superfinal and ultimately finished second. Their performances included original songs and comic reinterpretations of hits by Potap i Nastia ("Chumachechaia vesna"), Verka Serdiuchka ("Horilka"), Europe ("The Final Countdown"), Salvador Sobral ("Amar pelos dois"), Rammstein and Britney Spears, often with new Ukrainian‑language lyrics and theatrical staging.

In late 2017 Yurchenko announced that Yurcash would enter Ukraine’s national selection for the Eurovision 2018 with the song "Stop Killing Love". The band performed the song in the second semi‑final of the televised national selection in February 2018.

In 2019 Yurcash released their third studio album, Karali karparativav, conceived as the completion of a humorous and satirical trilogy that began with their first two albums.

=== 2020s and war ===
During the full‑scale Russian invasion of Ukraine, Yurchenko joined the Armed Forces of Ukraine and has been noted in media both for his volunteer work and for continuing to perform for soldiers and at charity events. In interviews he has described combining service with songwriting and online communication with fans.

From around 2023 the band’s line‑up has included Yurchenko’s son George on bass and a new keyboardist, Overko, alongside drummer Yurii "RAFF" Zakharchuk, as reported in regional and scene coverage of the group.

== X-Factor ==
On X-Factor 8 Yurcash became known for their playful, often provocative arrangements of familiar material. Their performances included a punk‑folk reworking of Potap i Nastia’s "Chumachechaia vesna", a version of Verka Serdiuchka’s "Horilka", a performance of Europe’s "The Final Countdown", a Ukrainian‑language reinterpretation of Salvador Sobral’s Eurovision ballad "Amar pelos dois", an adaptation of a Rammstein song set to Taras Shevchenko’s text "In the Casemate" under the title "Maty", and a cover of Britney Spears’ "Oops!… I Did It Again". Original songs performed on the show included "Mohyla" (based on Shevchenko’s poetry), "Ia idu" ("I’m Going"), "Kapitan dyryzhablia" ("Captain of the Airship") and "Stop Killing Love".

== Band members ==
=== Current members ===
- Yurii "Yurkesh" Yurchenko – vocals, bayan, accordion, keyboards, acoustic guitar (2004–present)
- George "Joe" Yurchenko – bass guitar (c. 2023–present)
- Valerii "Overko" Kolomiiets – keyboards (2020s–present)
- Yurii "RAFF" Zakharchuk – drums (2020s–present)

=== Former members ===
- Yurii "Kondrat" Kondratiuk – guitar
- Artur "Archibald" Makeiev – bass guitar

== Discography ==
=== Studio albums ===
- Oi (2006)
- Menuety. Tiulpany v tselofani (Menuets. Tulips in Cellophane) (2007)
- Karali karparativav (2019)

=== Selected singles ===
Yurcash have released numerous singles across their career, including "Oi!", "Mundial", "Menuety", "I Love You!", "Steliatsia tumany", "Yolochka zazhgys’", "Karparativna vecherinka", "100 sekund vesny", "Tanochky", "Nepravilna liubov", "Kapitan dyryzhablia", "Stop Killing Love", "Slukhai po provodakh", "Holota", "Rodyna Maty", "Yidu do Lvova", "Burky chy butynky", "Patriot", "Holubiie dali", "Romadubonos", "Divchyna z Maidana", "Pory roku", "Vals", "S.O.S.", "Kyiv–Kanada", "Zhovtyi skotch", "Panivna vysota", "Tilky ne sohodni" and "Vin v ZSU, vona v TRO".

== Music videos ==
The band have filmed music videos for songs such as "Oi!", "Mundial", "Menuety", "I Love You!", "Steliatsia tumany", "Yolochka zazhgys’", "Karparativna vecherinka" and "100 sekund vesny", which circulate on Ukrainian music channels and online platforms.
