= List of compositions by Borys Lyatoshynsky =

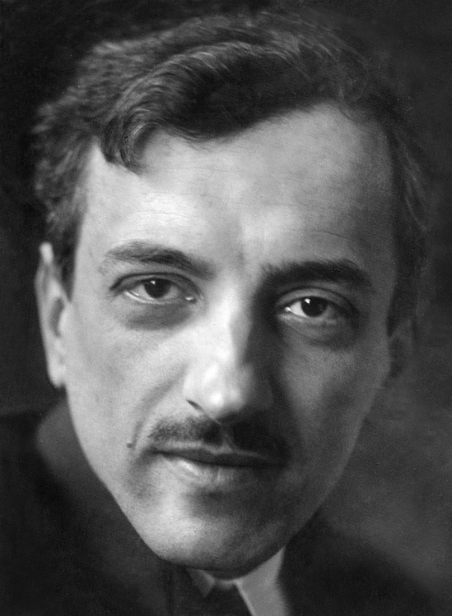
The Ukrainian composer Borys Lyatoshynsky

This is an incomplete list of compositions by Borys Lyatoshynsky.

Lyatoshynsky wrote a variety of works, including five symphonies, symphonic poems, and several shorter orchestral and vocal works, two operas, chamber music, and a number of works for solo piano. He wrote music with a modern European style and technique, skilfully combining it with Ukrainian folk music themes. His musical style later developed in a direction favoured by the Russian composer Dmitri Shostakovich, which caused significant problems with Soviet critics of the time, and as a result Lyatoshynsky was accused of formalism and the creation of degenerative art.

Lyatoshynsky's main works are his operas The Golden Ring and Shchors, the five symphonies, the Overture on Four Ukrainian Folk Themes (1926), the suites Taras Shevchenko (1952) and Romeo and Juliet (1955), the symphonic poem Grazhyna (1955), his "Slavic" concerto for piano and orchestra (1953), and the completion and orchestration of Reinhold Glière's violin concerto (1956). He composed film scores for such films as Carmelite (1931), Ivan (1932, with Yuliy Meitus), Taras Shevchenko (1951), Ivan Franko (1956, with Mykola Kolessa), and Grigory Skovoroda (1959). Many of his compositions were rarely or never performed during his lifetime.

== List of works by genre ==
=== Orchestral ===
Opus	Title	Date	Sub-genre	Song/movement titles	Notes/References
2	Symphony No. 1 in A major	1918–19	symphony	1 Allegro; 2 Allegro scherzando e leggiero; 3 Lento ma non troppo; 4 Allegro energico.	Premiered in June 1926 (conducted by Reinhold Glière, Lyatoshynsky's teacher); second edition 1967
3	Fantastic March (Фантастичний марш, Fantastychnyi marsh)	1920			Also referred to as the Marche fantastique.
20	Overture on Four Ukrainian Folk Themes	1927	overture		
23	Suite from The Golden Ring (Золотий обруч, Zolotyy obruch)	1928	suite	1 Overture; 2 Galician Dance; 3 Persian Dance; 4 Chinese Dance; 5 Indian Dance; 6 Coda.	
26	Symphony No. 2 in B minor	1935–36; premiered in 1964	symphony	1 Lento tenebroso e con maesta; Allegro deciso ed impetuoso; 2 Lento e tranquililo (alla ballata); 3 Allegro tumultuoso	Revised in 1940
49	Reunification (Возз'єднання, Vozzʺyednannya)	1949–50	symphonic poem		
50	Symphony No. 3 in B minor	1951	symphony	1 Prelude; 2 Nocturne; 3 Scherzo; 4 Intermezzo; 5 Postlude.	First conducted in public by Natan Rakhlin during an open rehearsal on was 23 October 1951; the revised symphony was premiered in Leningrad on 23 December 1955.
51	Suite from the film Taras Shevchenko	1952	suite	1 Introduction; 2 Shevchenko in Ukraine; 3 Execution; 4 The Parting of Friends; 5 Finale.	
54	Slavonic Concerto	1953	piano concerto	1 Allegro; 2 Lento ma non troppo; 3 Allegro risoluto	Also called the Slavic Concerto.
56	Suite from Romeo and Juliet	1955	suite	1 La valse de carnaval; 2 La pavane; 3 le jardin de Juliette; 4 Le duel de Romeo et Tybalt; 5 On port Juliette dans la chambre funéraire; 6 Dans la chambre funéraire de Capulet; 7 L'apethéose	
58	Grazyna	1955	symphonic poem		Written for the centenary of the death of the Polish poet Adam Mickiewicz.
59	On the Banks of the Vistula (На берегах Вислы, Na beregakh Visly)	1958	symphonic poem		
60	Polish Suite	1961	suite	1 Intrada; 2 Notturno; 3 Danza; 4 Intermezzo funebre; 5 Variazione piccoli	
61	Slavonic Overture	1961	overture		
63	Symphony No. 4 in B♭ minor	1963	symphony	1 Andante sostenuto e maestoso – Allegro moderato ma risoluto assai; 2 Lento tenebroso – Andante; 3 Allegro molto risoluto.	
66	Lyric poem To the Memory of Gliere	1964	symphonic poem		
67	Symphony No. 5 "Slavonic" in C major	1965–66	symphony	1 Andante maestoso – Allegro molto; 2 Lento e mesto – Andante tranquillo – Grave – Andante tranquillo – Lento e mesto; 3 Moderato – Allegro energico	
68	Slavonic Suite	1966	suite		
70	Festive Overture	1967	overture		Also Solemn Overture
	Fourths Prelude (квартах, kvartakh)	1915–16; 1919			
	Carmelite	1931	film music		
	Fires over the Shores (Вогні над берегами, Vohni nad berehamy)	1931	film music		
	Miners' March (Марш шахтарів, Marsh shakhtariv)	1932	film music		
	Optimistic Tragedy	1932	music for theatre		By Sun. Vyshnevsky (directed in 1932 by V. Nellie)
	Ivan	1932	film music		
	Two Days (Два дні, Dva dni))	1933	film music		Alternative title: Father and Son (Батько і син, Batʹko i syn).
	Love (Любов, Lyubov)	1933	film music		
	Crystal Palace (Кришталевий палац, Kryshtalevyy palats)	1934	film music		In collaboration with Ivan Belza
	Happy Finish (Щасливий фініш, Shchaslyvyy finish)	1934	film music		
	The Red Handkerchief (Червона хустина, Chervona khustyna)	1934	film music		
	Short stories about hero-pilots (Новели про героїв-льотчиків, Novely pro heroyiv-lʹotchykiv)	1938	film music		
	Liberation (Визволення, Vyzvolennya)	1940	film music		Originally Western Ukraine
	Forever Together	1949	music for theatre		by L. Dmiterko (directed by V. Nellie)
	Taras Shevchenko	1950–51	film music		
	Golden Plague	1953	music for theatre		(directed by K. Khokhlov)
	Romeo and Juliet	1954	film music		
	Music for the play Romeo and Juliet	1954	music for theatre	1 Carnival March; 2 Pavana; 3 Juliet's Garden; 4 Duel of Romeo and Tibald; 5 Juliet is carried to the crypt; 6 In the crypt of Capulet; 7 Apotheosis	(directed by B. Nord)
	Flame of Anger (Полум'я гніву, Polum'ya hnivu)	1955	film music		
	In the Forest	1955	music for theatre		by Lesya Ukrainka (directed by M. Sokolov)
	Bloody Dawn (Кривавий світанок), Kryvavyy svitanok)	1956	film music		In collaboration with M. Kolessa
	Ivan Franko	1956	film music		
	The Hooked Pig's Snout	1956	film music		
	Grigory Skovoroda	1959	film music		
	Airship (Летючий корабель, Letyuchyy korabel)	1960	film music		
	Intermezzo	1960	orchestral arrangement		Orchestration of the second movement of the String Quartet No. 2, Op. 4.
	Walking (Гулящая, Gulyashchaya) or Prostitute (Повія, Poviya)	1961	film music		
	Field Marshal Kutuzov		music for theatre		by V. Solovyov

==== Transcriptions ====
- Lysenko's opera Taras Bulba (with L. Revutsky)
- Lysenko's opera Aeneid.
- Gliere's Violin Concerto (with K. G. Mostras)
- Gliere's Comedians
- Gliere's Shah-Senem
- Gliere's ballet Red Poppy

=== Chamber ===
Opus	Title	Date	Sub-genre	Song/movement titles	Notes
1	String Quartet No. 1 in D minor	1915	string quartet	1 Allegro; 2 Allegro scherzando e legiero; 3 Lento ma non troppo; 4 Allegro energico	
4	String Quartet No. 2 in A major	1922	string quartet	I 1 Allegro non troppo; 2 Intermezzo. Molto lento; 3 Allegro vivace a leggiero; 4 Allegro molto	Published Moscow, Leipzig, Vienna 1934.
7	Piano Trio No. 1	1922	piano trio	1 Allegro non troppo; 2 Lento con freddezza; 3 Allegro fermamente	Score with parts available
19	Violin Sonata	1926; 1928	violin sonata	1 Allegro impetuoso; 2 Tempo precedente; 3 Allegro molto risoluto	
21	String Quartet No. 3 in A major	1928	string quartet	1 Prelude; 2 Nocturne; 3 Scherzo; 4 Intermezzo; 5 Postlude	
25	Three Pieces after Folksong Themes	1932	violin and piano	1 Pamir Melody; 2 Quiet Melody; 3 Dance	Also Three Songs on Tajik Themes
41	Piano Trio No. 2	1942	piano trio	1 Introduction (Maestoso); 2 In Character Ballad (Andante sostenuto); 3 Intermezzo (Allegretto pastorale, quasi allegro); 4 Theme and Variations (Andante sostenuto)	
42	"Ukrainian Quintet" in G minor	1942	piano quintet	1 Allegro e poco agitato; 2 Lento e tranquillo; 3 Allegro; 4 Allegro risoluto	
43	String Quartet No. 4 in D minor	1943	string quartet	1 Lento' 2 Allegretto semplice; 3 Allegro ben ritmico; 4 Andante sostenuto; 5 Allegro scherzando	
45	Suite on Ukrainian Folksong Themes	1944 (also 1951)	string quartet	1 Andante; 2 Andantino; 3 Andante non tanto; 4 Allegro scherzando	
46	Suite for Wind Quartet	1944	wind quartet	1 Moderato; 2 Andante; 3 Allegretto scherzando; 4 Lento ma non troppo; 5 Allegro	
55	Two Mazurkas on Polish Themes	1953	cello and piano	Mazurka No 1 in D minor; Mazurka No. 2, A minor	
65	Two Pieces for viola and piano	1963	viola and piano	1 Nocturne; 2 Scherzino	
	Youth Quartet in D minor	1913	piano quartet	1 Allegro agitato; 2 Andante expressivo; 3 Allegro appassionato	Score includes parts.
	Youth Quartet	1914	quartet	1 Allegro energico assai; 2 Allegro scherzando; 3 Adagio	
	Preludes	1942, 1943	piano, violin and cello		
	Melody on a Ukrainian Folk Theme	1947	cello and piano		
	Two Pieces		violin and piano		
	Ukrainian Dance		violin and piano		
	Old-fashioned Dance (Старовинний танець)		flute and piano		

=== Solo piano ===
Opus	Title	Date	Sub-genre	Song/movement titles	Notes
13	Piano Sonata No. 1	1924	piano sonata		Also known as the Slavic.
16	Reflections	1925		1 Maestoso e con fermezza; 2 Velutatu assai; 3 Tempestoso; 4 Disperato e lugubre; 5 Come di lontananza; 6 Ironicamente, misurato assai; 7 Con agitazione	
18	Piano Sonata No. 2	1925	piano sonata		Also Sonata Ballade.
24	Ballade	1929			
38	Three Preludes	1942		1 Andante sostenuto; 2 Lente tenebroso; 3 Moderato con moto e sempre ben ritmico	Also called the Shevchenko Suite.
44	Five Preludes	1943; published 1947		1 Poco lento e lugubre; 2 Lento e tranquillo; 3 Allegro agitato; 4 Andante sostenuto; 5 Impetuoso	
38b	Two Preludes	1942		1 Allegro tumultuoso; 2 Allegro risoluto	
	Mazurka No. 1	1910			Dated 20 January 1910.
	Waltz No. 1	1910			
	Mazurka No. 2	1912			
	Scherzo	1912			
	Mazurka No. 3	1913			
	Prelude in G minor	1914			
	Autumn Fantasy	1914			
	Waltz No. 2	1914			
	Mourning Prelude in E♭ minor	1920			Also known as the Elergy or Tragic Prelude.
	Suite	1941			
	Funeral Prelude				
	Prelude in F♯ minor				
	Concerto Etude-Rondo	1962; revised 1967			

=== Choral/vocal ===
Opus	Title	Date	Sub-genre	Song/movement titles	Notes
5a	Three Romances	1922	song(s)	1 "After the battle" (После боя, Posle boya); 2 "Death (at the cemetery)" (На кладбище, Na kladbishche); 3 "There was a king" (or "Ancient song") (Був цар, Buv tsar)	Words by Ivan Bunin and Heinrich Heine.
5b	Two Romances (Note: Belza's 1947 list of works includes a third romance, "On black sails".)	1922	song(s)	1 "Funeral song"; 2 "I dreamed"	Words by Percy Bysshe Shelley and Heine.
6	Three Romances	1925	romance(s)	1 "Accursed Place" (Проклятое место, Proklyatoye mesto); 2 "Autumn leaves rustled" (Листя осіннє шуміло, Lystya osinnye shumilo); 3 "At the Crossroads" (Закрыт на дальнем перекрёстке, Zakryt na dalʹnem perekrëstke)	
8	Two Romances	1923	romance(s)	1 "Reeds" (Камиші, Kamyshi); 2 "Underwater Plants" (Підводні рослини, Pidvodni roslyny)	For low voice, clarinet, horn, string quartet and harp.
9	Moon Shadows (Місячні тіні, Misyachni tini)	1924	romance(s)	"And the Moon Is White"; "Prelude"; "New Moon"; "The Disappearance of the Moon"	For high voice and piano; words by Igor Severyanin and Oscar Wilde.
10	Two Songs	1923	songs	1 "My dreams fade alone" (В'януть мрії мої в самоті, Vʺyanutʹ mriyi moyi v samoti); 2 "Moon" (Місяць, Misyatsʹ)	After Shelley.
11	The Seagull (Чайка, Chayka)	1924	romance(s)		To words by Konstantin Balmont; for high voice and piano.
12	Two Romances	1924	romance(s)	1 "They loved each other" (Вони закохались обоє, Vony zakokhalysʹ oboye); 2 "When the groom left" (Коли жених пішов, Koly zhenykh pishov)	Words by Maurice Maeterlinck.
14	Four Romances	1924	romance(s)	1 "Although there are no harmonious songs" (Хоч не звучать гармонійні пісні, Khoch ne zvuchatʹ harmoniyni pisni); 2 "I am afraid of your caress" (Я ласк твоїх боюсь, YA lask tvoyikh boyusʹ); 3 "Good Night" (Надобраніч, Nadobranich); 4 "Past days" (Минулії дні, Mynuliyi dni)	Text by Shelley; for middle voice and piano.
15	Two Romances for bass and piano	1924	romance(s)	1 "Ozymandias"; 2 "When I swam in a stormy sea" (Коли я в бурхливому морі плавав, Koly ya v burkhlyvomu mori plavav)	Words by Konstantin Balmont, after Shelley; published 1928.
17	Three Romances for high voice, based on the texts of ancient Chinese poets	1925; 1934	romance(s)	1. "Ancient" (Давнє, Davnye) or "In my golden house…"; 2. "I stand on the jasper steps" ((При яшмових сходах туга, Pry yashmovykh skhodakh tuha); 3. "The stream where the bird sings" ((Потік, де співає птах, Potik, de spivaye ptakh) or "I live alone"	Words by the Chinese poet Cui Hao; also referred to as Op. 18.
23	The Golden Ring (Золотий обруч, Zolotyy obruch)	1929; revised 1970; published 26 March 1930	opera	Introduction; Act I: Scene 1 (The Polonyna in the Zelemen Mountains); Dance; Scene 2 (Maidan around the old oak); Act II: Scene 3 (The Tatar camp); Dance No 1; Dance No 2; Dance No 3 (Indian); Final Dance; Scene 4 (The estate of Tgar Vovk); Scene 5 (Tatar camp at night); Act III: Scene 6 (Dabot cave (in the Zelemen Mountains); Scene 7 (Tatar camp, the tent of Tugar Vovk); Intermezzo; Scene 8	The libretto by the poet Jacob Mamontov, based on Zachar Berkut, a short story by the Ukrainian writer Ivan Franko.
27	Four Romances	1936	romance(s)	1 "On the Hills of Georgia" (На холмах Грузии, Na kholmakh Gruzii); 2 "Three Springs" (Три ключа, Tri klyucha); 3 "There on the Shore" (Там на брегу, Tam na bregu); 4 "I know the fight" (Мне бой знаком, Mne boy znakom)	To words by Alexander Pushkin.
28	Arrangements of Ukrainian Folk Songs	1937	songs	1 "Oh sleep and don't lie down" (Ой, не спиться й не лежиться, Oy, ne spytʹsya y ne lezhytʹsya); 2 "Bend down, thick vines" (Хилітеся, густі лози, Khylitesya, husti lozy); 3 "The Cossack is carried and the horse is led" (Козака несуть і Коня ведуть, Kozaka nesutʹ i Konya vedutʹ); 4 "She had to have one daughter" (Мала мати одну дочку, Mala maty odnu dochku); 5 "Snow is coming, a blizzard is blowing" (Сніжок іде, метiль мете, Snizhok ide, metilʹ mete); 6 "Oh horse, my horse" (Ой, коню, мій коню, Oy, konyu, miy konyu); 7 "Worlds, worlds, moons" (Світи, світи, місячень ко, Svity, svity, misyachenʹ ko); 8 "Red Christmas tree" (Червоная калинонька, Chervonaya kalynonʹka); 9 "I grow, I grow, I grow green" (Гаю, гаю, зелен розмаю, Hayu, hayu, zelen rozmayu); 10 "Oh, if I only knew" (Ой, коли б я була знала, Oy, koly b ya bula znala)	
29	Shchors	1937	opera		5 acts; after Ivan Kocherha and Maksym Rylsky; revised as The Commander in 1948.
30	Solemn Cantata	1939	canata for choir and soloists, and orchestra		Words by Rylsky; now lost.
31	Five romances	1940	romance(s)	1 "Your eyes are like the sea" (Твої очі, як те море, Tvoyi ochi, yak te more); 2 "Why do you appear to me? (Чого з'являешся мені, Choho z'yavlyaeshsya meni); 3 "Boundless field" (Безмежнеє поле, Bezmezhneye pole); 4 "Why do you never laugh?" (Чому не смієшся ніколи?, Chomu ne smiyeshsya nikoly?); 5 "Do not pass by so proudly, my child" (Не минай з погордою, Ne mynay z pohordoyu)	To words by Franko.
32	"The Sun"	1940	romance(s)	1 "A seagull flew into the rainbow" (В райдугу чайка летіла, V rayduhu chayka letila); 2 "Recurring Dreams" (Все мені сниться, Vse meni snytʹsya)	Text by Mikhail Lermontov.
33	Arrangements of Ukrainian Folk Songs	1941	songs		
34	Arrangements of Ukrainian Folk Songs	1941	songs		
35	Arrangements of Ukrainian Folk Songs	1942	songs		
36	Arrangements of Ukrainian Folk Songs	1942	a capella song(s)		
37	Two Romances	1942	romance(s)	1 "Star" (Зоря, Zorya); 2 "The Height of Happiness" ('Найвище щастя, 'Nayvyshche shchastya)	
39	Two Romances	1942	romance(s)	1 "Stork" (Лелека, Leleka); 2 "Lullaby" (Колискова, Kolyskova)	Words by Sava Golovanivsky.
40	Songs	1942	songs	1 "In the mist of tears" (В тумані сліз, V tumani sliz); 2 "It will be so"(Так буде, Tak bude); 3 "It's like a dream" Неначе сон, Nenache son)	Words by Volodymyr Sosiura.
47	Seasons	1949	a capella song(s)	"Autumn" (Осінь, Osinʹ); "Spring" (Весна, Vesna); "Summer" (Літо, Lito); "Winter" (Зима, Zyma)	Lyrics by Pushkin.
48	Five Songs		a capella song(s)		
52	Two Songs to words by Pushkin	1952	a capella song(s)	1 "The moon creeps across the sky" (По небу крадется луна, Po nebu kradet·sya luna); 2 "Who, the waves, stopped you" (Кто, волны, остановил тебя, Kto, volny, ostanovil tebya)	
57	Romances for bass and piano	1951	romance(s)	1 "A letter to Siberia" (Послание в Сибирь, Poslaniye v Sibirʹ); 2 "Elegy" (Элегия, Elegiya)	
62	Four Songs set to words by A. Fet	1963	a capella song(s)	"By the fireplace"; "In the evening twilight"; "Autumn night"; "At dawn"	Lyrics by Afanasy Fet.
64	Five unaccompanied mixed songs on the words of M. Rilsky	1964	a capella song(s)	1 "Autumn" (Осінь, Osinʹ); 2 "Rain" (Дощ, Doshch); 3 "Wide Field" (Широке поле, Shyroke pole); 4 "Sleep in your white bed!" (Спи в своїй білій постелі!, Spy v svoyiy biliy posteli!); 5 "The rain eased" (Дощ одшумів, Doshch odshumiv)	The premiere occurred after the poet's death, on November 29, 1964 in Kyiv.
69	Four songs From the Past		a capella song(s)		
65a	Four Songs		a capella song(s)	1 "I love a gloomy day" (Люблю я хмурый день, Lyublyu ya khmuryy den'); 2 "The leaves whisper thoughtfully" (Шепчут задумчиво листья, Shepchut zadumchivo listʹya); 3 "I love the darkness of the night" (Люблю ночную тьму, Lyublyu nochnuyu tʹmu); 4 "Glory to those who yearn for freedom" (Слава тем, кто жаждет воли, Slava tem, kto zhazhdet voli)	Words by Rylsky.

==== Song cycles without an opus number ====
- Songs after Shevchenko (including "Water flows into the blue sea" (Тече вода в синє море, Teche voda v synye more); 2 "The sun rises from behind the grove" (Із-за гаю сонце сходить, Iz-za hayu sontse skhodytʹ)). 1949–1951.
- Two songs ("When the well shakes"; "How will you hear at night"). Lyrics by Franko.
- Songs to texts by Shevchenko (1 "A banner behind a banner" (За байракомбайрак, Za bayrakom bayrak)); 2 "On the Dnieper Saga" (Над Днiпровою сагою, Nad Dniprovoyu sahoyu)). 1960.
- Two Ukrainian folk songs ("Oh, a quiet wind is blowing in the field" (Ой, у полі тихий вітер віє, Oy, u poli tykhyy viter viye)); "Oh, a long time ago". 1934.
- Songs for mixed choir accompanied by piano (1 "Thought about the Cossack Sophron" (Дума про козака Софрона, Duma pro kozaka Sofrona)); 2 "About Karmelyuk" (Про Кармелюка, Pro Karmelyuka)). 1932.

==== Individual songs with no opus number ====
- "Airship" (Воздушный корабль, Vozdushnyy korablʹ).
- "And in those small houses" (А у тих багачок, A u tykh bahachok).
- "Bygone days" (Минувшие дни, Minuvshiye dni). 1931. Romance after Shelley.
- "Haze" (Серпанок, Serpanok). 1919–1920. From a text by Balmont; also set in Russian.
- "Heart of the Kobzar" (Серце Кобзаря, Sertse Kobzarya).
- "In the album of Caroline Janisz" (В альбом Кароліні Яниш, V alʹbom Karolini Yanysh).
- "I walked in the crossroads" (У перетику ходила, U peretyku khodyla).
- "I was a guest in your heart" (Гостював в твоєму серц, Hostyuvav v tvoyemu sertsii). 1924.
- "Oh, if my heart is cold" (Якби мені серце холодне, Yakby meni sertse kholodne). 1924. Words by Balmont.
- "Sum of spring" (1919–1920). Весна грустит Vesna grustit
- "Terrible is the cold of the evenings" (Жахливий холод вечорів, Zhakhlyvyy kholod vechoriv). 1926.
- Testament. 1939. Cantata after Shevtchenko.
- "The grove turns green again" (Знову гай зазеленів, Znovu hay zazeleniv). 1922–1924.
- "The heart of the Kobzar" (Серце Кобзаря, Sertse Kobzarya). 1964. Words by Valentin Bychko.
- "The monk's mountain" (Чернеча гора, Chernecha Gora). 1964. Words by Evgeny Fomin.
- "There are brown eyes" (Єсть карії оч, Yestʹ kariyi ochii). 1927. Text by Shevchenko.
- "The silence and fragrance of sleeping flowers" (Тиша й пахощі квітів у дрімоті, Tysha y pakhoshchi kvitiv u drimoti). 1922.
- "The sorrow of spring" (Сум весни, Sum vesny). 1919–1920.
- "The sun" (Солнце, Solntse). Words by Lermontov.

The following songs need to be sourced:

- "Creeping, periwinkle".(Та стелись, стелись, барвиночку, Ta stelysʹ, stelysʹ, barvinochku)
- "Glorious Way". 1939
- "My dreams fade in solitude" (В'януть мрії мої в самоті, Vʺyanutʹ mriyi moyi v samoti)
- "Old and young" (Старий i молода, Staryy i moloda).
- "Our comrade-in-arms fell under the birch". 1950. Lyrics by Anatoly Sofronov.
- "Silence, the fragrance of dormant flowers".
- "The moon creeps across the sky".
- "The sun rises over Siberia" (За Сибiром сонце сходить, Za Sybirom sontse skhodytʹ).
- "The sun rises at the horizon", after Shevtshenko.
- "Yesterday was Saturday night" (Вчора була суботонка, Vchora bula subotonka).

=== Wind band ===
- Solemn March (1931)
- March for marching band (1932)
- March to the Ukrainian folk tunes for marching band (1936)

== Sources ==
- Amarphy, Tatiana (2018). "Матеріали І Міжнародної Студентської Науково-Практичної Конференції "Європейський Вимір Культурнотворчої Спадщини Бориса Лятошинського"" [The International Student Scientific and Practical Conference: "The European Dimension of the cultural heritage of Borys Lyatoshynshy"] (PDF). Student Scientific Bulletin (18): 3–6.
- Baley, Virko (2001). "Lyatoshyns′ky, Borys Mykolayovych". Grove Music Online (8th ed.). Oxford University Press. ISBN 978-1-56159-263-0. (subscription, Wikilibrary access, or UK public library membership required)
- Belza, Igor (1947). Б.Н. Лятошинський: заслужений діяч мистецтв УРСР [B.N. Lyatoshynsky: Honoured Art Worker of the USSR] (in Ukrainian). Kyiv: Art Publications. OCLC 13936532.
- Bentya, Y.V. (2015). "The personal collection of Borys Lyatoshynsky" (PDF). Reviews of Sources and Documentary Essays (in Ukrainian). Ukraine State Archives Service: 121–135.
- Dytyniak, Maria (1986). Українські Композитори [Ukrainian Composers] (in Ukrainian). Edmonton, Alberta: Canadian Institute of Ukrainian Studies.
- Greenfield, Edward; March, Ivan; Layton, Robert (1999). The Penguin Guide to Compact Discs. London; New York: Penguin Books. ISBN 978-01404-6-887-8 – via Internet Archive.
- Gruzin, D.V. (2009). "Lyatoshynsky Borys Mykolayovych". In Smoliy, V.A. (ed.). Encyclopedia of the History of Ukraine (in Ukrainian). Vol. 6 La-Mi. Institute of History of Ukraine.
- Hakobian, Levon (2016). Music of the Soviet Era: 1917-1991. Taylor & Francis. ISBN 978-13170-9-187-5.
- Izvarina, Elena (2016). "Опера "Золотий Обруч" Б. Лятошинського В Контексті Універсалій Культури: Зміна Смислів Інтерпретації" [B. Lyatoshynsky's opera The Golden Ring in the context of the universals of culture: changing the meanings of interpretation] (PDF). The Culturology Ideas (in Ukrainian and English) (9): 123–127. ISSN 2311-9489.
- Martsenkivska, O.V. (2016). "Фортепіанна творчість Р. М. Глієра та Б. М. Лятошинського в контексті семантичного аналізу" [Piano creativity of R.M. Glier and B.M. Lyatoshynsky in the context of semantic analysis]. Kyiv Musicology (in Ukrainian) (52): 116–134.
- Rud, Lolita (2018). "На Перехресті Театру І Музики. Симфонічна Сюїта "Ромео І Джульєтта" Б.Лятошинського" [At the crossroads of theatre and music: the symphonic suite "Romeo and Juliet" by B. Lyatoshynsky] (PDF). Student Scientific Bulletin (18): 41–44.
- Samokhvalov, Victor Yakovlevich (1973). Mokritskaya, L.M. (ed.). Borys Lyatoshynsky (in Ukrainian) (2nd ed.). Kyiv: Musical Ukraine.
- Savchuk, Igor Borisovich, ed. (2015). Борис Лятошинський: Романси [Boris Lyatoshynsky: Romances of the1920s] (PDF) (in Ukrainian). Kyiv: National Academy of Arts of Ukraine. ISBN 9-786-17640-176-6.
- Savchuk, Igor; Gomon, Tatiana (2019). "Boris Lyatoshinsky's Early Creativity: The Semantic Aspect". Art Research of Ukraine (in Ukrainian) (19): 169–182. doi:10.31500/2309-8155.19.2019.185990. ISSN 2309-8155. S2CID 242333813.

=== Further reading ===
- "Boris Liatoshinsky". Soviet Composers. Onno van Rijen. 4 March 2006. Archived from the original (online list of works, including recordings) on 5 March 2009.
