= Symphony No. 2 (Lyatoshynsky) =

1936 symphony by Borys Lyatoshynsky

Symphony No. 2 in B minor
- by Borys Lyatoshynsky
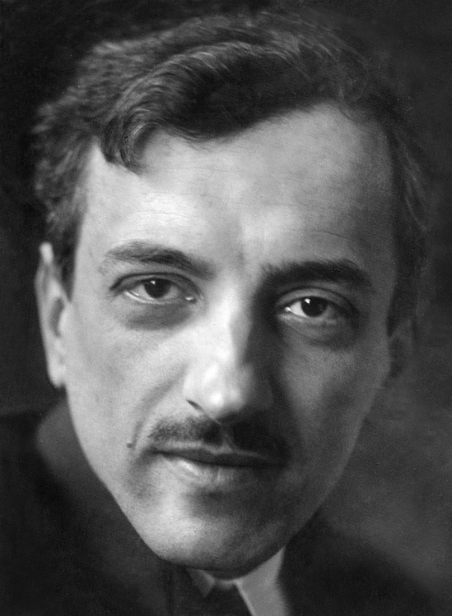
- Borys Lyatoshynsky
- Opus: 26
- Composed: 1936
- Movements: Three

Premiere
- Date: April 1941
- Location: Kyiv Philharmonic
- Conductor: Lyatoshynsky

The Symphony No. 2 in B minor is a symphony by the Ukrainian composer Borys Lyatoshynsky. It has three movements.

The symphony was commissioned in 1933 by the Organizing Bureau of the Union of Soviet Composers. The premiere in Moscow was cancelled as a result of official criticism against it and the period of national mourning that followed the death of Sergo Ordzhonikidze. Lyatoshynsky revised his symphony in 1940. It was performed in public in 1941 and again in 1947. Following renewed official criticism of Lyatoshynsky and his music in 1948, the symphony was banned once more. It was not performed again until 1964, four years before the composer's death.

The symphony has been described by the composer Virko Baley as Lyatoshynsky's masterpiece.

== Background ==
During the 1920s, the Soviet government gradually suppressed cultural life in the Soviet Union, and strenuously opposed the development of Ukrainian classical music. Its use of the arts as a political propaganda tool caused a serious decline in artistic standards, and Soviet composers were purged by the authorities, who forced them to follow popular taste and follow the principles of Socialist realism. During the 1930s, the Ukrainian composer Borys Lyatoshynsky was among those composers who suffered hardship and disappointment as a direct result of these Soviet policies.

== Official criticism and performances ==
=== Events leading to the cancellation of the 1937 premiere ===
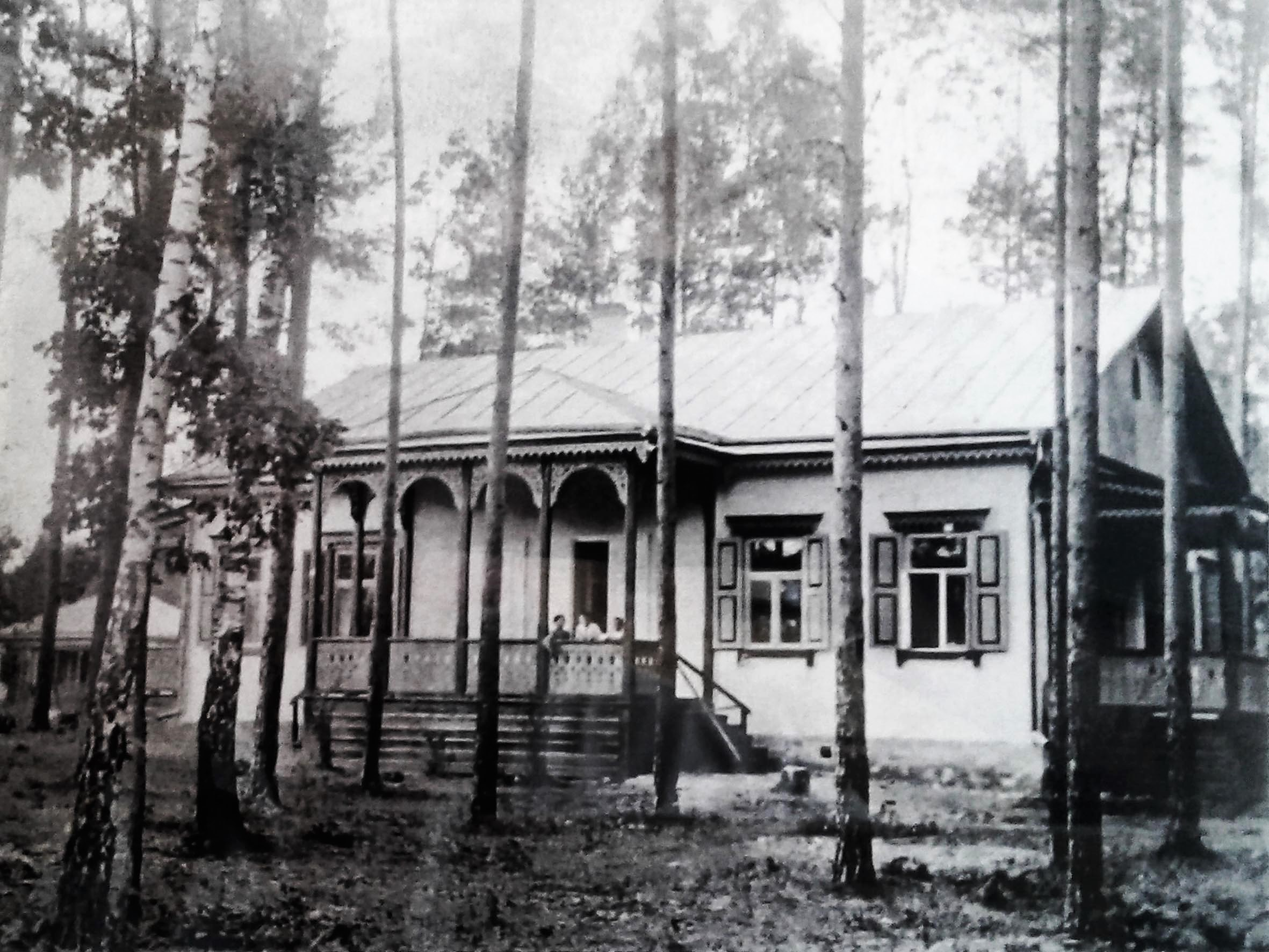
The family dacha in Vorzel, near Kyiv, where Borys Lyatoshynsky wrote his second symphony

Lyatoshynsky's Second Symphony in B minor (op. 26) was commissioned in 1933 by the Kharkiv Organizing Bureau of the Union of Soviet Composers, to be premiered in Moscow along with a number of other works by Ukrainian composers. The symphony was to be a large-scale work in three movements. Lyatoshynsky worked on the symphony during 1935 and 1936, whilst staying at the family dacha in Vorzel, near Kyiv, where he lived and worked during the summer. Many of his works were written in its garden, where he would compose without the use of a musical instrument.

The fate of Lyatoshynsky's symphony is, according to Marianna Kopystia, "the most tragic one in the history of Ukrainian musical culture during the Soviet times". The music was first heard when it was played by the State Symphony Orchestra of the USSR during rehearsals for the planned premiere. (Note: The orchestra was formed in 1936. Its conductor was Alexander Gauk.) In a letter to his old teacher and close friend the composer Reinhold Glière, (Note: Lyatoshynsky's former teacher Glière supported Lyatoshynsky throughout their life-long friendship. He conducted the first performance of Lyatoshynsky's graduation composition, the Symphony No. 1 in 1923.) written on 20 March 1937, Lyatoshynsky described the orchestra's behaviour during rehearsals:

Throughout the rehearsals, the orchestra members argued about the symphony—some criticized it, others praised it. At the dress rehearsal there was a so-called "discussion" of the work, which consisted of the fact that some of the performing orchestra members behaved incredibly arrogantly and declared that this was "not music" at all, that it was "nonsense", that it was "100% formalism", etc. like that.

The symphony was criticised in an article in Soviet Art, written by the Russian musicologist Daniel Zhitomirsky five days after a rehearsal in which he had been present. Zhytomyrsky accused Lyatoshynsky of formalism, and described the symphony as an "empty and far-fetched work" that made an "imposing and complex sound" in which "constant ups and downs, multi-meaningful thunderous climaxes reflect the author's claim to depth of thought". The composer told Glière: "I have never had such a devastating review in my life."

The premiere, scheduled for February 1937, was cancelled by the authorities. The official reason for the cancellation was that the concert would have taken place during a period of national mourning for Sergo Ordzhonikidze, the politician regarded by the public as the driving force behind the industrialization of the Soviet Union, who had died suddenly on 18 February.

=== 1940 revision and first public performances ===
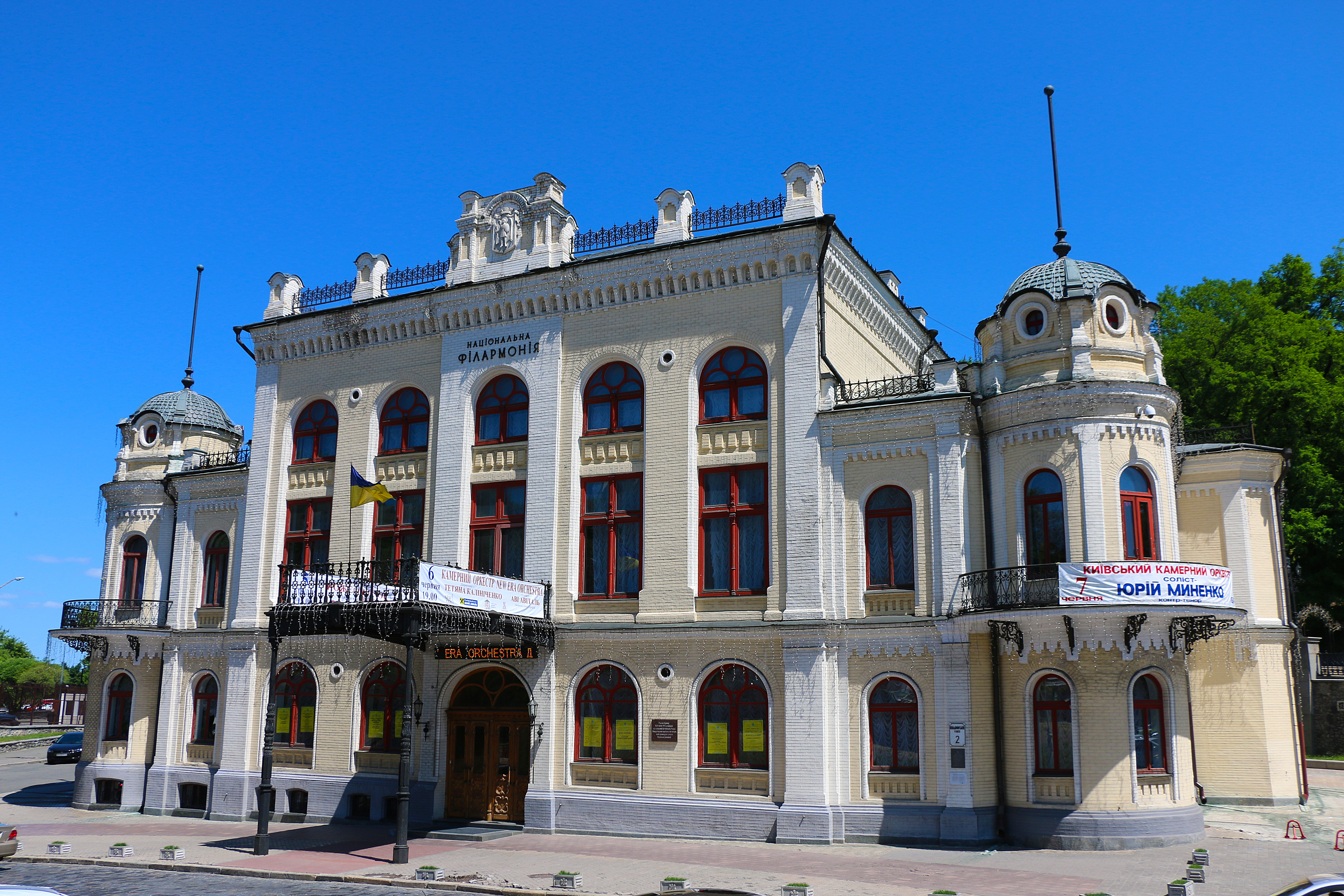
The Kyiv Philharmonic, where Lyatoshynsky conducted a performance of the symphony in April 1941

The symphony's third movement, which has a positive-sounding conclusion, may have been altered when the score was revised by Lyatoshynsky in 1940, although the musicologist Levon Hakobian describes the alterations made by Lyatoshynsky as "minor".

In April 1941, two months before the German invasion of the USSR, a concert was held at the Kyiv Philharmonic, when Lyatoshynsky conducted the Second Symphony and a number of his other works. The work was next performed in 1947, in Odesa and Lviv. In a letter to Glière dated 3 November 1937 [sic], Lyatoshynsky wrote:

Now as a composer, I have come to life, just a little. I'm now starting to tour. Today, 3 November, I am going to Odesa, where I will have a concert on the 10th [November 1947], so I will be there all the holidays. There will be six rehearsals. The Second Symphony and other works will be performed. There is going to be a soloist [playing] two romances with an orchestra. At the end of this month, on the 23rd or 30th, there will be a concert in Lviv. In Odesa, they will give me a telegram about the exact date of the concert. I am very happy, of course, about these trips.

Lyatoshynsky later described to Glière the frustrations and pleasures of the Odesa and Lviv concerts, both of which included performances of the Second Symphony. He noted that he met with few problems, apart from having to use a cramped rehearsal space in Odesa, and that bad weather in Lviv meant the audience was smaller than expected.

On 26 November 1947, the Ukrainian teacher and composer Tadeusz Mayersky wrote a short letter to Lyatoshynsky, expressing his admiration after hearing the Second Symphony performed by the Lviv Philharmonic four days earlier:

I am very sorry that I did not have the opportunity to talk to you about your incomparable music, which is so close to me, and that I was not able to express my deep admiration for your talent and skill. Your symphonic music belonging to the cohort of such vast holdings as the symphonies Scriabin, Strauss, Stravinsky, I was very impressed. It's been a long time since I've been so moved as I felt after listening to your Second Symphony. This is a real event, especially for me. I was really charmed.

=== Renewed criticism, 1948 ===
In April 1948, the symphony was named anti-people and formalistic by the First All-Union Congress of Union of Composers of the USSR. The symphony's perceived faults were described in an official government statement:

The anti-national formalist direction in Ukrainian musical art appeared first of all in the works of the composer B. Lyatoshynsky. The Second Symphony of B. Lyatoshynsky is especially alien to the artistic tastes of the Soviet people. The piece is disharmonious, cluttered with unwarranted thunderous sounds of the orchestra, which depress the listener, and in relation to the melody, it is a symphony and colourless.

— Central Committee of the Communist Party of the Soviet Union, Sovetskaya Kultura (26 May, 1948)

Lyatoshynsky wrote afterwards to Glière, "As a composer, I am dead, and I do not know when I will be resurrected." The work was allowed to be heard again in 1964, when it was performed by the Lugansk Regional Philharmonic Orchestra.

== Score ==
The symphony is scored for 3 flutes and piccolo, 2 oboes, English horn, 3 clarinets, basset horn, bass clarinet, 3 bassoons, contrabassoon, 4 horns, 3 trumpets, 3 trombones, tuba, percussion, harp, and strings.

The Central State Archives-Museum of Literature and Art of Ukraine (TsDAMLM of Ukraine) holds the autograph score and parts of the Second Symphony. It is dated 13 March 1936.

== Description and analysis ==
The symphony has three movements:

1. Lento tenebroso e con maesta – Allegro deciso ed impetuoso
2. Lento e tranquillo (Alla ballata)
3. Andante

The Second Symphony has been described by the Ukrainian-American composer Virko Baley as Lyatoshynsky's masterpiece. The darkest of his five symphonies, it is a complex work that, in the opinion of the music historian Anthony Phillips, reflects "the individual's often conflicting relationship with reality". The work can be interpreted as depicting images of the reality of Soviet life, often using atonality. The Ukrainian musicologist Dina Kanievska has described the symphony as revealing "the rift between beauty and cruelty".

According to the Ukrainian American conductor Theodore Kuchar:

The Second Symphony ... is the first example of a Ukrainian-Soviet symphonic drama of conflict, with underlying contrast of pictures and moods by means of linear polyphony in the development of symphonic material. Here, however, is an example of a masterpiece doomed for long to remain unheard through historical circumstance. This history of early critical opinion and the consequences of the symphony reflect the general situation in that period of Ukrainian culture, when each new work was judged by its effectiveness in the promulgation of the canons of Soviet Realism. Censors were not satisfied with Lyatoshynsky's success in portraying a complex and eccentric reality and a generally insulting atmosphere throughout the symphony, a work turbulent, nervous, filled with deep pain and flashes of protest, yet, equally clearly, showing the composer's love of life and his ideal of artistic and ethical responsibility to his own people.

Lyatoshynsky's First Symphony, with its dynamic finale that conformed with emerging Soviet expectations in large-scale orchestral works, is more tuneful than the Second, and more influenced by the style of the Russian composer Alexander Scriabin. The symphony contains dramatic contrasts. Lyatoshynsky used the bass clarinet to obtain a distinct orchestral sound, and in combination with the bassoon, a grimly dramatic effect is produced. (Note: A similar orchestration effect is also found in his symphonic ballad Grazyna (1955).) The symphony's re-occurring motto-like leitmotif acts to give the work a sense of unity:

The Lento con brio tenebroso e con maesta, with its sense of foreboding, begins mysteriously. This low-sounding introduction is followed by the Allegro deciso ed impetuoso, which is similarly dominated by the lower instruments. The gentler second subject, provided by the harp and lower strings, is regularly overcome by the brass and woodwind. The turbulent movement ends in an abrupt way.

The Lento e tranquillo is less troubled that either of the other two movements. It opens with a beautiful basset horn solo, accompanied by the harp. The solo is interrupted by the woodwind, but eventually returns to conclude the movement off.

In the Andante, the troubled nature of the first movement returns, whilst a tune attempts to lift the listener's spirits as the end of the symphony is approached. The symphony finishes on a stressed minor chord, having failed to resolve the sense of conflict that was implicit throughout the work.

== Sources ==
- Anderson, Martin (1994). "Review". Tempo (190): 47–53. JSTOR 945487.
- Baley, Virko (2001). "Lyatoshyns′ky, Borys Mykolayovych". Grove Music Online (8th ed.). Oxford University Press. ISBN 978-1-56159-263-0. (subscription, Wikilibrary access, or UK public library membership required)
- Bentya, Y. V. (2015). "Особовий фонд Бориса Лятошинського у ЦДАМЛМ України (до 120-річчя від дня народження видатного українського композитора, диригента і педагога)" [Personal fund of Borys Lyatoshinskyi at the Central Academy of Music of Ukraine (to the 120th anniversary of the birth of the outstanding Ukrainian composer, conductor and teacher)] (PDF). Archives of Ukraine (in Ukrainian). 298 (4). Kyiv: National Library of Ukraine named after V. I. Vernadskyi: 121–135.
- Hakobian, Levon (2016). Music of the Soviet Era: 1917–1991. Taylor & Francis. ISBN 978-13170-9-187-5.
- Jaffé, Daniel (2022). Historical Dictionary of Russian Music. Rowman & Littlefield Publishers. ISBN 978-15381-3-008-7.
- Kopystia, Marianna (2022). "Borys Liatoshynskyi and the artists of Lviv: epistolary notes to the biography of the artist". Modern Art (18): 321–328. doi:10.31500/2309-8813.18.2022.273815.
- Savchuk, Ihor (2020). Борис Лятошинський І Польська Культура [Boris Lyatoshinsky and Polish culture: communicative fields of creativity Комунікативні Поля Творчості] (PDF) (PhD thesis). Kyiv: National Academy of Arts of Ukraine.
- Schlögel, Karl (2012). Moscow 1937. Translated by Livingstone, Rodney. Cambridge, Cambridgeshire: Polity. ISBN 978-0-7456-5076-0.
- Shovgenjuk, Stepan (2015). "A bass-clarinett timbre and the features of this using in the symphonyc opuses by Borys Lyatoshinsky". Musicology & Cultural Science / Musikismc'odneoba da Kulturologia. 12 (2): 25–32. ISSN 1512-2018. 116597278.
- Tammaro, Ferrucio (2017). "War Symphonies and Peace Symphonies: Sibelius' Fifth". In Krohn, Anna; Howell, Tim; Murtomäki, Veijo (eds.). Jean Sibelius's Legacy Research: on his 150th Anniversary. Cambridge Scholars Publishing. ISBN 978-15275-0-087-7.
