= Borys Lyatoshynsky =

Ukrainian composer (1895–1968)

Borys Lyatoshynsky PAUkrSSR
- Борис Лятошинський
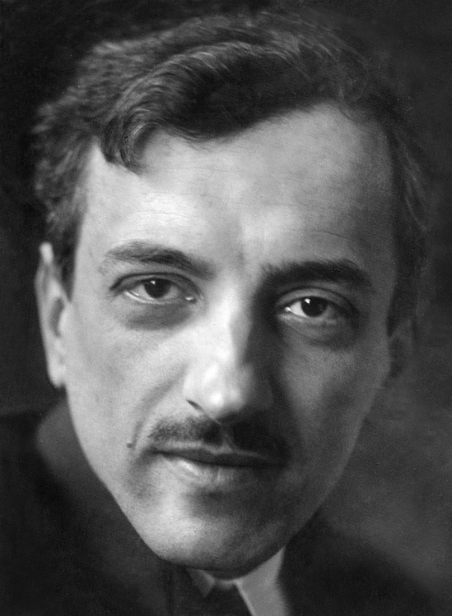
- Lyatoshynsky in 1920
- Born: 3 January 1895; Zhytomyr, Russian Empire
- Died: 15 April 1968 (aged 73); Kyiv, Soviet Union
- Years active: 1920–1968
- Awards: Shevchenko National Prize
- Musical career
- Occupations: Composer; teacher
- Instruments: Violin; piano

Signature
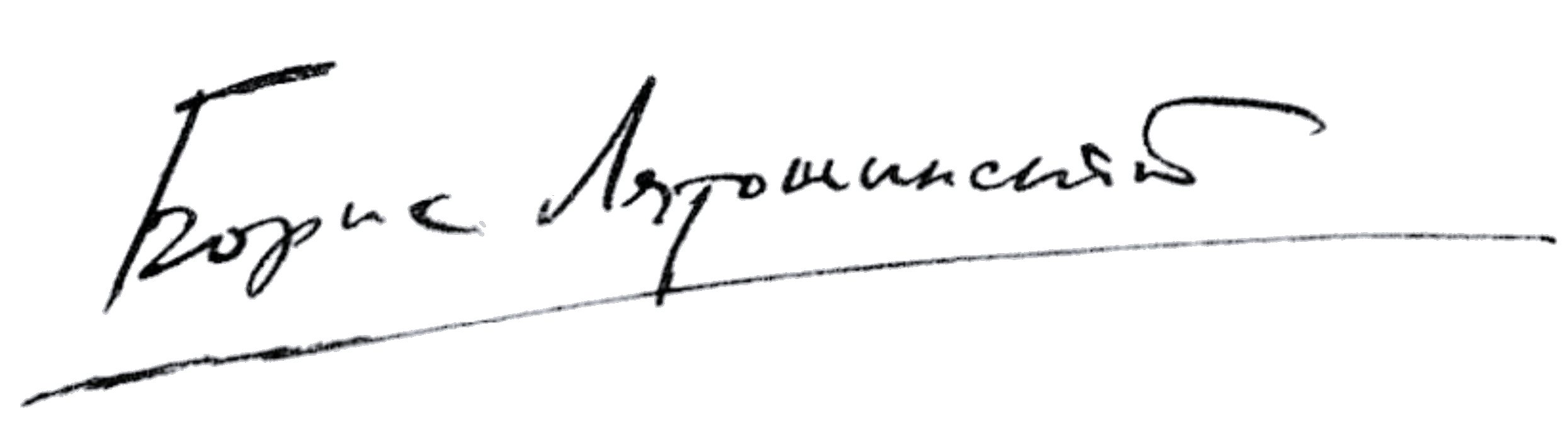

Borys Mykolaiovych Lyatoshynsky, (Note: Ukrainian: Борис Миколайович Лятошинський) also known as Boris Nikolayevich Lyatoshinsky, (Note: Russian: Борис Николаевич Лятошинский) (3 January 1895 [O.S. 22 December 1894] – 15 April 1968) was a Ukrainian composer, conductor, and teacher. A leading member of the new generation of 20th century Ukrainian composers, he was awarded a number of accolades, including the honorary title of People's Artist of the Ukrainian SSR and two Stalin Prizes.

He received his primary education at home, where Polish literature and history was held in high esteem. After completing school in 1913, he entered the Faculty of Law at Kyiv University, and as a graduate was employed to teach music at the Kyiv Conservatory. During the 1910s, Lyatoshynsky wrote 31 works of various musical genres. During the 1930s he travelled to Tajikistan to study folk music and compose a ballet about the life of local people. From 1935 to 1938, and from 1941 to 1944, he taught orchestration at the Moscow Conservatory. During the war, Lyatoshynsky was evacuated and taught at the Conservatory's branch in Saratov, where he worked on arrangements of Ukrainian songs, and organised the transportation of Ukrainian musical manuscripts away to safety.

Lyatoshynsky's main works are his operas The Golden Ring (1929) and Shchors (1937), the five symphonies, the Overture on Four Ukrainian Folk Themes (1926), the suites Taras Shevchenko (1952) and Romeo and Juliet (1955), the symphonic poem Grazhyna (1955), his "Slavic" piano concerto (1953), and the completion and orchestration of Reinhold Glière's violin concerto (1956). Many of his compositions were rarely or never performed during his lifetime. A 1993 recording of his symphonies first brought his music to worldwide audiences.

Despite his music being criticised by the Soviet authorities, who officially banned such compositions as his Second Symphony, Lyatoshynsky never adhered to a style of socialist realism. His music was written with a modern European style, and skilfully includes Ukrainian themes. His early musical style was influenced by his family, his teachers (including Glière), and by Margarita Tsarevich. The existence of a Polish side to Lyatoshynsky's family resulted in Polish themes being central for many of his works. He also drew inspiration for his early compositions from Tchaikovsky, Glazunov, and Scriabin. His musical style later developed in a direction favoured by Shostakovich. Soviet and Ukrainian composers who studied under Lyatoshynsky, and were influenced by him, include Myroslav Skoryk and Valentyn Sylvestrov.

== Biography ==
=== Family and early life ===
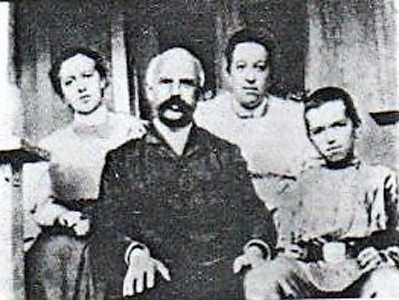
Borys Lyatoshynsky with his parents and sister Nina, photographed at the beginning of the 20th century

Borys Lyatoshynsky was born on 3 January 1895, in Zhytomyr, Ukraine (then part of the Russian Empire). His parents were both musical and well-educated, and their son received his primary education at home. The Lyatoshynsky family lived in towns and cities throughout Ukraine during Borys's childhood. His father Mykola Lyatoshynsky was a history teacher, who during his career was the head teacher of high schools in Zhytomyr, Nemyriv, Kyiv, and—from 1908 to 1911—in Zlatopil. (Note: In 1909, two years before his retired, Mykola Lyatoshynsky celebrated 25 years as a teacher, and many of his colleagues, former students, their parents and friends sent him congratulatory telegrams. After his retirement, he gave lectures on local history, and published articles in the local press. In March 1911 he was elected a full member of the Society of Researchers of Volyn. He worked on a history textbook, which was later published.) Lyatoshynsky's mother Olha Borysovna played the piano and sang. Borys had an older sister, Nina.

Polish literature and history was held in high esteem in the Lyatoshynsky household; Borys read a lot as a boy, especially the historical and romantic works of Henryk Sienkiewicz and Stefan Żeromski. He signed his early musical compositions under the pseudonym 'Boris Yaksa Lyatoshynsky', using the name of a Polish knight who had fought in the Battle of Grunwald. His earliest pieces included mazurkas, waltzes, and a Chopinesque scherzo, which bear little resemblance to compositions written later in life. The existence of a Polish side to Lyatoshynsky's family resulted in Polish themes being central for much of his work. Zhytomyr was the cultural and administrative centre of a region long inhabited by ethnic Poles, and his first music teacher was of Polish origin.

Lyatoshynsky graduated from the Zhytomyr Gymnasium in 1913. Later in life, he recalled that he "became really interested in music" at school; he mastered the violin, and created his first compositions, which included a piano quartet. The pieces, although naïve and unoriginal, revealed his musical talent, and motivated his father to encourage his efforts as a schoolboy composer. In Zlatopol, Lyatoshynsky took piano lessons from a school teacher whom he later remembered with great warmth. In 1914, he first met his future wife Margarita Tsarevich.

=== Student years ===
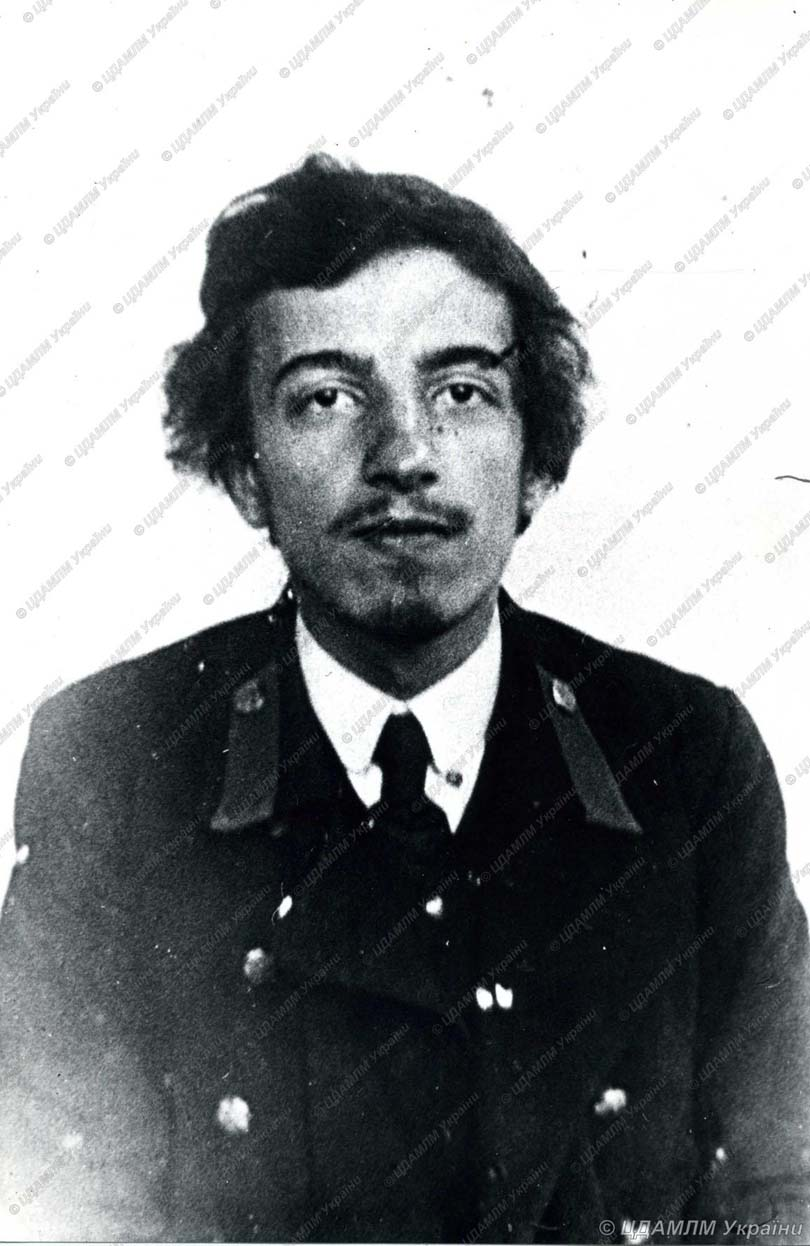
Lyatoshynsky in 1913

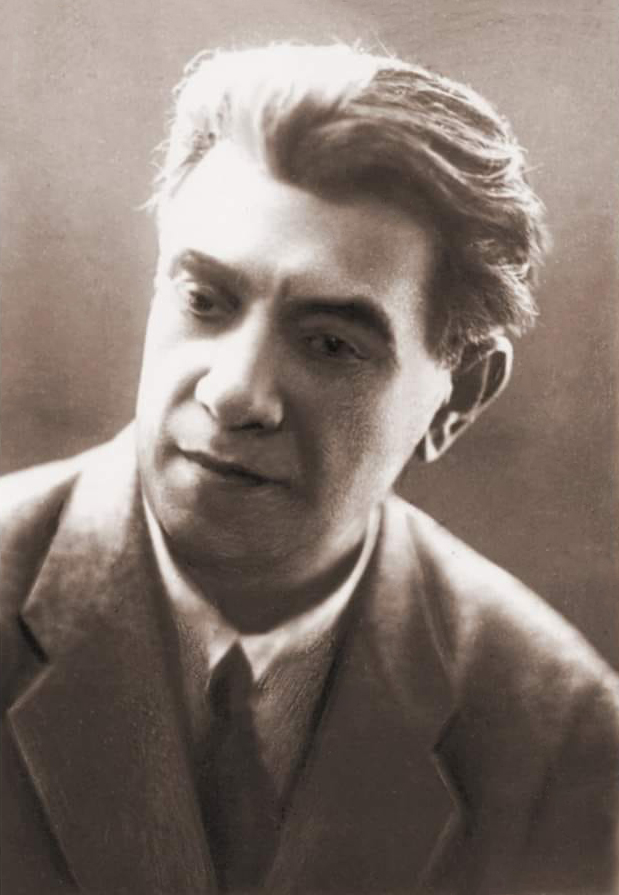
Reinhold Glière, Lyatoshynsky's composition teacher

The first work written by Lyatoshynsky was thought by musicologists to have been a mazurka, written on 20 January 1910, when he was 15. However, during the 1910s, Lyatoshynsky wrote 31 works of various musical genres—20 of which were discovered in 2017— none of which were known by his previous biographers. The pieces have provided scholars with an indication of the creative potential of the young composer.

In 1913, on the advice of his father, Lyatoshynsky entered the Faculty of Law at Kyiv University. When his piano quartet was performed in public in time for his father's birthday, the local press praised the work, although it was clear to those who heard the piece that the piano part was over-dominant. Lyatoshynsky's family decided to ask the composer Reinhold Glière, then the director and professor of the newly opened Kyiv Conservatory (now the Ukrainian National Tchaikovsky Academy of Music), to teach the young man composition. His mother brought Glière the score of the quartet, and Glière agreed to teach him. A postcard has survived which reads: “I invite His Excellency Mr. Borys Lyatoshynsky to my first lesson. Professor Glier." (Note: After Glière's death, Lyatoshynsky finished and orchestrated his friend's violin concerto, and in 1964 he dedicated the Lyric Poem to his memory.) Lyatoshynsky's early musical style was influenced by his family, his teachers, and his future wife Margarita Tsarevich—in his letters to her written between 1914 and 1916, his first ideas about writing music are revealed.

Lyatoshynsky enrolled at the Conservatory as a student. He graduated from the university in 1918. After graduating from the Conservatory the following year, he was employed there as a music composition teacher. During his student years, he composed his String Quartet No. 1, Op. 1 (1915), and his Symphony No. 1, Op. 2 (1918–1919, revised in 1967). According to the musicologists Igor Savchuk and Tatiana Gomon, perhaps the most tragic of his early piano works is "Mourning Prelude", a transitional work and one of his most powerful, which was written on 19 December 1920, the day his father died of typhus.

During this early period of Lyatoshynsky's development as a composer, he drew inspiration from works by Pyotr Ilyich Tchaikovsky, Alexander Glazunov, and Alexander Scriabin. Many young composers of the Russian Empire similarly regarded Scriabin's experiments as a turning point in music. Lyatoshynsky's Piano Trio No.1 (1922) for violin, cello, and piano, is a work that attempts to have greater dynamic content and complexity; its sections are more contrasting than in previous works.

=== Career at the Kyiv Conservatory ===
From 1922 to 1925, Lyatoshynsky, then a 25-year-old lecturer and teacher of composition in the Kyiv Conservatory, organised and led the Ukrainian Society of Contemporary Music. He was appointed as professor of composition in 1935. During the 1920s, the Communists introduced a policy of korenizatsiia ("indigenization"), designed to foster indigenous cultures as a way to undermine what was perceived as imperial domination. Korenizatsia produced a cultural climate that encouraged Lyatoshynsky and his contemporaries to be experimental and innovative. During the first half of the decade, Lyatoshynsky concentrated mainly on composing chamber music for the violin and the piano, writing pieces such as his String Quartet No 2, the Trio for piano, violin and cello, and two piano sonatas. He also composed songs, some of them set to the lyrics of the Chinese ancient poets. Reflections (1925), a cycle of seven pieces for the piano, is one of a small number of works for the instrument; his other piano works are the sonatas (written in 1924 and 1925), Ballade (1928), a suite (1942), and seven of his series of 10 preludes, written in 1942 and 1943.

During the 1920s Lyatoshynsky composed a series of romances based on the writings of poets that included Heinrich Heine, Konstantin Balmont, Paul Verlaine, Oscar Wilde, Edgar Allan Poe, Percy Shelley, Maurice Maeterlinck, and a setting of Heine's poem "Black sails on a boat" (1922–1924). Other works include his Sonata for Violin and Piano (1924), and the String Quartet No 3. His opera The Golden Ring (written in 1929), based on a novel by the Ukrainian writer Ivan Franko, describes the struggle of the Ukrainians against the Mongol invaders in the 13th century. The Golden Ring was not considered to adhere to the doctrine of the Communist Party. His second opera, Shchors (1937), was based on the story of the Ukrainian communist Mykola Shchors during the conflict in Ukraine that followed the end of the First World War. The Piano Sonata No.1 was published in Moscow in 1926, the year he composed an overture based on Ukrainian folk music—the Overture on Four Ukrainian Themes, his first attempt at integrating his own musical style with original folk tunes. In June that year, Glière performed the premiere of Lyatoshynsky's First Symphony in a concert programme. (Note: The Symphony No. 1 was not played again in Lyatoshynsky's lifetime. It was next performed by the State Symphony Orchestra of Ukraine under the direction of Volodymyr Kozhukhar in September 1970.)

During 1931–1932, Lyatoshynsky wrote an orchestral suite for orchestra. From 1932 to 1939, he was a committee member of the Bureau of the Union of Composers of Ukraine. Following the commission from the officials of the Odesa Opera and Ballet Theatre, he travelled to Tajikistan to study folk music and compose a ballet about the life of local people. In 1932, he composed his Three Songs on Tajik Themes for violin and piano, based on the folk music of the region.

=== Second Symphony ===
"A composer whose voice does not reach the people is not even zero, but a negative value. I will strive to make my music close to the people.”

— Borys Lyatoshynsky

The Second Symphony in B minor was commissioned in 1933 by the Organizing Bureau of the Union of Soviet Composers, to be premiered in Moscow along with a number of other works by Ukrainian composers. Lyatoshynsky worked on the symphony for six months during 1934. The work was criticised in the press, even though it had yet to be performed, with one critic writing: "The second symphony, with its external complexity and imposing sound, leaves the impression of an extremely empty, far-fetched work”. Due to the national mourning at the time for the Soviet politician Sergo Ordzhonikidze, the premiere was cancelled.

=== Moscow Conservatory and evacuation to Saratov ===
From 1935 to 1938, and from 1941 to 1944, Lyatoshynsky taught orchestration at the Moscow Conservatory. He was the chairman of the Union of Composers of Ukraine in 1939.

When the threat to Kyiv became real during the German invasion of the USSR, the government in Moscow worked to protect the city's main artistic organisations and artists. Theatre groups, orchestras, and composers were evacuated to the interior of the USSR. Whilst helping to develop the culture and art of the republics they were sent to, Ukrainian artists continued to develop their national music.

Many faculties of the Moscow Conservatoire, including the music department, were relocated to Saratov, a town near the Volga, and Lyatoshynsky was evacuated there along with his colleagues, In Saratov, the Ukrainian Taras Shevchenko Radio Station broadcast political speeches and daily concerts of Lyatoshynsky's arrangements of Ukrainian music. He created solo pieces, and works for chamber groups, notably his "Ukrainian Quintet" for piano and strings (1942, 2nd ed. 1945), which was awarded the State Prize in 1943. Other works included the String Quartet No 4 (1943), a suite on Ukrainian folk tunes for string quartet (1944), and a suite for a quartet of wooden wind instruments (1944). He established contacts and worked collaboratively with the administrators of the local Concert Hall and Radio Committee. Under his leadership, Ukrainian musical manuscripts were transported away to safety.

The composer's niece, Iya Sergeyevna Tsarevich, was brought up in the composer's house from the age of five. She recalled when German troops used Lyatoshynsky's Kyiv house on Lenin Street as a headquarters. There was a danger that everything that was in the house could be lost, so Lyatoshynsky's father-in-law used a cart to take all the composer's papers to the family dacha at Vorzel, outside Kyiv, where they were kept for the rest of the war.

=== Post-war career ===
In September 1943, Lyatoshynsky was invited by the Moscow Conservatory to work there for a year, but on 10 November 1943, after the liberation of Kyiv, he returned on the first flight back to his home city, as part of a delegation that included the poets Maksym Rylsky and Mykola Bazhan, and the artist Mykhailo Derehus.

After the war he wrote a number of symphonic poems and other orchestral works: Возз'єднання (Reunion, 1949); the Taras Shevchenko Suite (1952); his Slavic Concerto for Piano and Orchestra (1953); На берегах Вісли (On the Banks of the Vistula, 1958); the Third, Fourth and Fifth symphonies, the Slavic Overture (1961). Grazhina (1955), written for the centenary of the death of the Polish poet Adam Mickiewicz, was based on Mickiewicz's poem Grażyna, about a chieftainess who led her people into war against the Teutonic Order, and the Polish Suite (1961) was dedicated to his friend the Polish composer and violinist Grażyna Bacewicz.

In 1948, when formalism in music was once again being attacked, Lyatosynsky's Second Symphony was denounced as being anti-national and formalistic. It was denounced by the Central Committee of the Communist Party of the Soviet Union, who stated:

“The anti-national formalist trend in Ukrainian musical art was manifested primarily in the works of composer B. Lyatoshynsky. This is a disharmonious work, cluttered with unjustified thunderous sounds of the orchestra, which depress the listener, and in terms of melody—the symphony is poor and colourless.”

Lyatoshynsky wrote at this time of his despondency over the prohibition of his music by the authorities. After performances of the work were forbidden, Lyatoshynsky wrote to his friend Gliere, "As a composer, I am dead, and I do not know when I will be resurrected."

The Third Symphony was not heard by the public for several years. The conductor Natan Rakhlin was brave enough to perform it to a packed concert hall during a daytime performance. Lyatoshynsky wrote to Glière that "the crowded hall literally gave me a standing ovation". However, the composer was accused of "abstract understanding of the struggle for peace", and told by the authorities that the symphony did not "reveal the true Soviet reality". (Note: It was once thought incorrectly that Lyatoshynsky considered his Third Symphony a failure and destroyed it.) The Golden Ring was revived during the Khrushchev Thaw, when it was staged by Dmytro Smolych in Lviv.

During the 1960s, Lyatoshynsky, by then a member of the Composers’ Union of the USSR, was allowed to take ‘cultural’ trips abroad, where he met fellow composers. Accompanied by his wife, he visited Austria, Switzerland, and other countries. He was a member of international competition juries for the International Tchaikovsky Competition in Moscow in 1958 and again in 1962, the Belgian Quartet Competition in Liège (in 1956, 1959, and 1962) and the Mykola Lysenko Music Competition in Kyiv in 1965. He was the artistic director of the Ukraine Philharmonic, and worked as a music consultant on the Ukrainian State Radio Committee. He travelled to Poland on several occasions to Warsaw Autumn festivals of contemporary music. In 1957, as a representative of the Union of Composers of the USSR, he travelled to Bulgaria during the centennial celebrations for the death of Mikhail Glinka.

During the last years of his life, Lyatoshynsky completed the Solemn Overture Op. 70 (1967) for orchestra. He died on 15 April 1968, and was buried in the Baikove Cemetery in Kyiv; a bust has since been added to the grave.

== Honours, awards, and commemorations ==
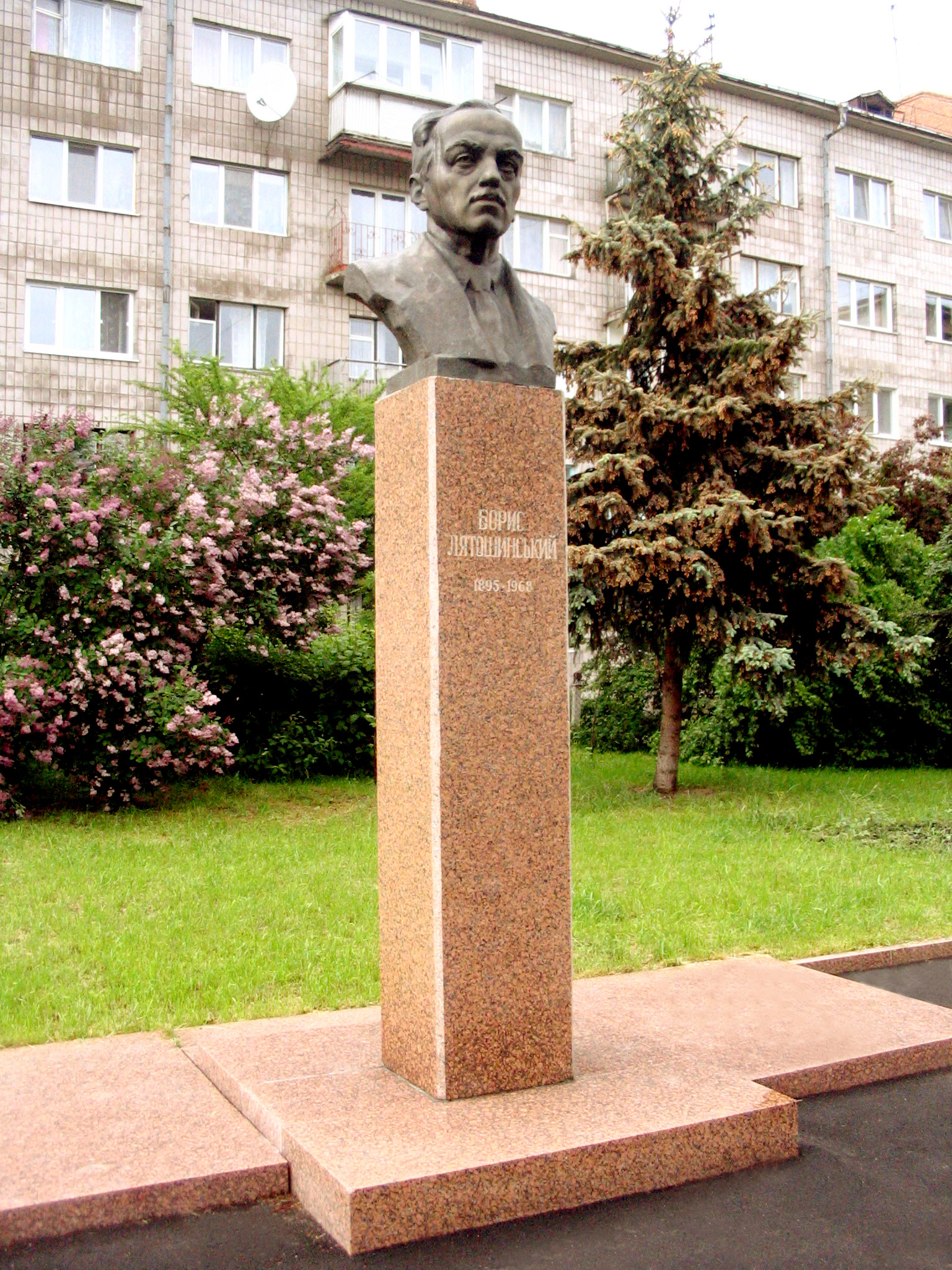
The monument to Lyatoshynksy in Zhytomyr

- Two Stalin Prizes (second class):
  - (1946) – for the Ukrainian Quintet; first class
  - (1952) – for the music for the 1951 film Taras Shevchenko
- Shevchenko National Prize (1971) (awarded posthumously) – for the opera The Golden Ring
- People's Artist of the Ukrainian SSR (1968)
- Honored Art Worker of the Ukrainian SSR (1945)
- Order of Lenin (1960)
- Order of the Red Banner of Labour
- Two Orders of the Badge of Honour (1938, 1951)
- The Polish state prize – ‘for the strengthening of Russo-Polish friendship’ (1963)

A monument to Lyatoshynsky was erected in Zhytomyr in honour of the composer. A commemorative plaque was erected in Kyiv at the house where he lived from 1944 to 1968 (now 68 B. Khmelnytskoho Street), and in 1977 a street in Kyiv was renamed in his honour. A room is dedicated to Lyatoshynsky in the Vorzel Museum of History and Culture.

In 1992 the Kyiv Chamber Choir joined with a newly-formed chamber orchestra, and became the B. Lyatoshynsky Classical Music Ensemble. The Kharkiv Music School is also named after Lyatoshynsky. In 2020 the Kharkiv Music Festival launched the Borys Lyatoshynsky Young Composers Competition.

== Works ==
Lyatoshynsky wrote a variety of works, including five symphonies, symphonic poems, and several shorter orchestral and vocal works, two operas, chamber music, and a number of works for solo piano. He wrote nearly 50 songs. He produced four string quartets, in 1915, 1922, 1928, and 1943. His earliest compositions (such as his First Symphony) were greatly influenced by the expressionism of Scriabin and Sergei Rachmaninoff. Lyatoshynsky wrote music with a modern European style and technique, skillfully combining it with Ukrainian themes. In 1940, Dmitri Shostakovich visited a plenum of the Union of Soviet Composers in Kyiv. There he singled out the music of both Lyatoshynsky and Levko Revutsky for their "high level of craftsmanship" which "pleasantly amazed" him. After the war, Lyatoshynsky was accused of formalism and creation of degenerative art.

Lyatoshynsky's main works are his operas The Golden Ring and Shchors, the five symphonies, the Overture on Four Ukrainian Folk Themes (1926), the suites Taras Shevchenko (1952) and Romeo and Juliet (1955), the symphonic poem Grazhyna (1955), his "Slavic" concerto for piano and orchestra (1953), and the completion and orchestration of Glière's violin concerto (1956). He composed film scores for such films as Karmelyuk (1931), Ivan (1932, with Yuliy Meitus), Taras Shevchenko (1951), Ivan Franko (1956, with Mykola Kolessa), and Grigory Skovoroda (1959).

=== Symphonies ===
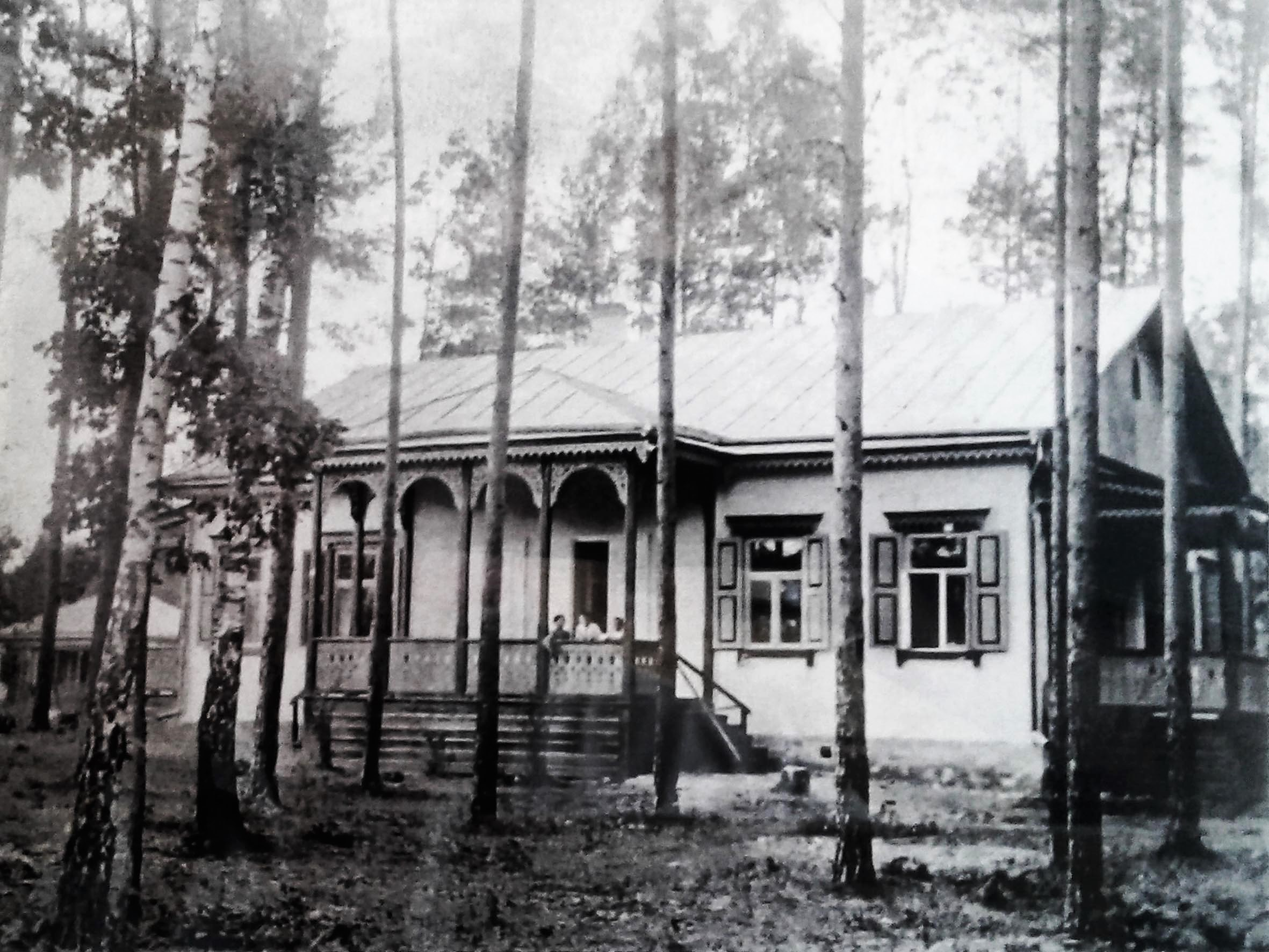
The preserved family dacha in Vorzel, near Kyiv, where Lyatoshynsky wrote his symphonies (photographed in 1910)

Lyatoshynsky's symphonies "reflect the stresses of the period of their composition". It has been suggested by the music writer Gregor Tassie that his First Symphony (1918–1919) is the earliest symphony to be composed in Ukraine after the 18th century composer Maksym Berezovsky. More tuneful and Scriabinesque in comparison with his four other symphonies, it was written as his graduation composition at a time when he had become influenced by the music of Scriabin and Richard Wagner. It was conducted in 1923 by Glière. The First Symphony is described in the 1999 edition of The Penguin Guide to Compact Discs as "a well-crafted, confident score" that "abounds in contrapuntal elaboration and abundant orchestral rhetoric". A vision of the war similar to that in Nikolai Myaskovsky's Symphony No. 5 was expressed in the symphony. The reflective second movement is balanced by a finale that is, according to the music historian Ferrucio Tammaro, "not only dynamic, but even heroic, in close conformity with the tastes of emerging Soviet symphonism".

The music for the Second Symphony (1935–1936) can be interpreted as depicting images of the reality of Soviet life, often using atonality. Written in the conventional three-movement form, the symphony is full of contrasting moods and dramatic contrasts. This expansive, romantic symphony was censored by the authorities and was not heard until 1964.

The bellicose Third Symphony (1951–1954), with its combative first movement, has been compared with Shostakovich's better-known Symphony No. 7, but other movements, such as the start of the second movement, have a personal and original lyricism and imaginative orchestration, such as at the end of the work, when a folk song (first heard in the opening movement) returns accompanied by brass and bells. The longest and perhaps his most popular symphony, it is as lyrical-sounding as the First, but less derivative and more assured. According to The Penguin Guide to Compact Discs, the Third Symphony "tries hard to be a good Soviet symphony"; the confident-sounding finale of the work was designed to help the work acquire political acceptability.

The last two symphonies by Lyatoshynsky are completely different from their predecessors—the composer Valentyn Silvestrov, who studied under Lyatoshynsky, recalled that when writing his last two symphonies, Lyatoshynsky "seemed to belong to another planet". According to the musicologist Marianna Kopytsia, they have become regarded by Ukrainians as the pinnacle of modern Ukrainian musical culture. The Fourth Symphony (1963) has an expressive contemporary character, challenging for the listener because of its atonal aspects, and is more reminiscent of Shostakovich than its predecessors. The slow second movement begins darkly, but is followed by a chorale surrounded by shimmering bells and a celesta used to depict the Belgian city of Bruges, "a brief but really haunting invention". The symphony's coda contains lyrical string solos and a subdued clashing of bells.

In his Fifth Symphony (the 'Slavonic', in C major, (1965–1966)), which includes liturgical melodies from the Orthodox Church, the music is more post-Nationalist in nature than other works composed during this period in the composer's career, Lyatoshynsky included a Russian folk song as the main theme and a song from Yugoslavia as a secondary theme. Like Gliere's Symphony No. 3, it alludes to Ilya Muromets, a legendary Russian warrior.

=== Operas and choral works ===
Lyatoshynsky wrote the opera Schors (1937–1938, revised as The Commander in 1948), and The Solemn Cantata (1939). In 1927 he edited and arranged the score for Mykola Lysenko's 1910 comic opera Aeneid (1927) and for Lysenko's Taras Bulba (1936–1937).

Lyatoshynsky's opera The Golden Ring, first staged in 1930, is the most notable example of Ukrainian historical opera during the first half of the 20th century. The music and the libretto blend historical, mythological, and social themes, and Lyatoshynsky's score organically combines contemporary musical expressions (such as leitmotifs) with Ukrainian folk tunes. The Golden Ring was the first example of an orchestrally 'symphonic' work in the history of Ukrainian opera. It appeared at the end of the era of creative experimentalism, which ended with the arrival of Stalinism. Over the next three decades, the opera failed to gain a foothold in the repertoire.

=== Other works ===
Critics have praised smaller-scale works by Lyatoshynsky. They include Intermezzo from the Second String Quartet, op.4 (1922) orchestrated in the early 1960s, and the Lyric Poem (1964), an elegy written in memory of Glière. The orchestrated version of the Intermezzo, which according to the British classical music journalist Michael Oliver consists of "delicate melodies floating over a gently rocking pulse", is praised by him as being "magical". Impressionistic touches in Lyatoshynsky's smaller-scale works can be seen in the second and fifth of his Reflections, where he uses the tone quality of instruments, transient layers of harmonies, and variable rhythms.

== Reputation and legacy ==
The Lyatoshynsky museum-room in the Music School, Zhytomyr

Lyatoshynsky is one of the most highly regarded and influential Ukrainian composers of the 20th century, and a key figure of the modern school in Ukrainian music, whose works consistently demonstrate his mastery of composition and orchestration. According to The New Grove Dictionary of Music and Musicians, he is one of the three Ukrainian artists of the first half of the 20th century to have received international recognition, and the most accomplished Ukrainian composer to emerge following the death of Dmitry Bortniansky in 1825.

Soviet and Ukrainian composers who studied under Lyatoshynsky, and were influenced by him, include Igor Boelza, Ihor Shamo, Roman Vereshchagin, Alexander Kanershtein, Gleb Taranov, Myroslav Skoryk, Yevhen Stankovych, Lesia Dychko, Leonid Hrabovsky, Ivan Karabyts, and Silvestrov, who dedicated a symphony to his teacher. Lyatoshynsky 's teaching method was characterised by his desire for his students to learn to think independently. (Note: The styles of Lyatoshynsky and Silvestrov had features in common: both composers were drawn to composing smaller piano works, and during their early careers, both composers selected techniques and elements that allowed them to form a musical vocabulary that they resorted to in later compositions.)

His correspondence with his old friend and teacher Glière (edited by Kopytsia) was published in 2002. On 28 October 2018, the Lutheran Church of St. Catherine in Kyiv hosted a concert of choral works by Lyatoshynsky "Under the Autumn Stars", the first collection of the composer's choral heritage to be created since Ukraine attained independence.

There is a permanent exhibition about Lyatoshynsky at Uvarovy House, in Vorzel.

== Sources ==
- Anderson, Martin (1994). "Review". Tempo (190): 47–53. JSTOR 945487.
- Baley, Virko (2001). "Lyatoshyns′ky, Borys Mykolayovych". Grove Music Online (8th ed.). Oxford University Press. ISBN 978-1-56159-263-0. (subscription, Wikilibrary access, or UK public library membership required)
- Belza, Igor (1947). Б.Н. Лятошинський : заслужений діяч мистецтв УРСР [B.N. Lyatoshynsky: Honoured Art Worker of the USSR] (in Ukrainian). Kyiv: Art Publications. OCLC 13936532.
- Dytyniak, Maria (1986). Українські Композитори [Ukrainian Composers] (in Ukrainian). Edmonton, Alberta: Canadian Institute of Ukrainian Studies.
- Greenfield, Edward; March, Ivan; Layton, Robert (1999). The Penguin Guide to Compact Discs. London; New York: Penguin Books. ISBN 978-01404-6-887-8 – via Internet Archive.
- Frolova-Walker, Marina (2016). Stalin's Music Prize: Soviet Culture and Politics (Appendices) (PDF). Yale University Press. ISBN 978-03002-0-884-9. Archived from the original (PDF) on 3 August 2016.
- Gruzin, D.V. (2009). "Lyatoshynsky Borys Mykolayovych". In Smoliy, V.A. (ed.). Encyclopedia of the History of Ukraine (in Ukrainian). Vol. 6 La-Mi. Institute of History of Ukraine.
- Lyatoshynsky, Boris; Grisenko, L.; Matusevych, N. I.; Belza, Igor (1986). Воспоминания, письма, материалы в 2-х частях: Письма, материалы [Memoirs, Letters, Materials (2 volumes)] (in Russian). Kyiv: Musical Ukraine. OCLC 15473433.
- Oliynyk, Svetlana (2012). "Five preludes for piano by B. Lyatoshynsky: figurative-thematic concept of the cycle". Contemporary Music in the Modern World: A Collection of Scientific Papers. Zhytomyr: Zhytomyr State University Library: 29–31.
- Samokhvalov, Victor Yakovlevich (1973). Mokritskaya, L.M. (ed.). Borys Lyatoshynsky (in Ukrainian) (2nd ed.). Kyiv: Musical Ukraine.
- Savchuk, Igor Borisovich, ed. (2015). Борис Лятошинський: Романси [Boris Lyatoshynsky: Romances of the 1920s] (PDF) (in Ukrainian). Kyiv: National Academy of Arts of Ukraine. ISBN 9-786-17640-176-6.
- Savchuk, Igor; Gomon, Tatiana (2019). "Borys Lyatoshinskiy's early work: semantic aspect". Art History of Ukraine (in Ukrainian and English) (19): 169–182. doi:10.31500/2309-8155.19.2019.185990. ISSN 2309-8155. S2CID 242333813.
- Serdyuk, O.V.; Umanets, O.V.; Slyusarenko, T.O. (2002). Українська музична культура: від джерел до сьогодення [Ukrainian Musical Culture: from the beginning to the present] (in Ukrainian). Kharkiv: Osnova. ISBN 978-5-7768-0708-4.
- Tammaro, Ferrucio (2017). "War Symphonies and Peace Symphonies: Sibelius' Fifth". In Krohn, Anna; Howell, Tim; Murtomäki, Veijo (eds.). Jean Sibelius's Legacy Research: on his 150th Anniversary. Cambridge Scholars Publishing. ISBN 978-15275-0-087-7.
- Tronko, Petro, ed. (1968). "Music in the Years of the Great Patriotic War". The History of Cities and Villages of the Ukrainian SSR (in Ukrainian). Vol. 11.
- Zhaleyko, D. (2015). "Творчество Бориса Лятошинского и Валентина Сильвестрова: параллели и метаморфозы" [Creativity of Boris Lyatoshynsky and Valentin Silvestrov: parallels and metamorphoses]. Scientific Notes (in Russian). 1 (33). Vladimir Hnatiuk Ternopil National Pedagogical University: 112–122.

=== Further reading ===
- Lunina, A.E. (2014). "Євген Станкович: "Борис Лятошинський – Унікальний Український Композитор"" [Yevhen Stankovych: "Borys Lyatoshynsky – Unique Ukrainian Composer"]. Journal of the National Music Academy of Ukraine (in Ukrainian). 24 (3). Kyiv: 102–115. ISSN 2414-052X.
- Nikitina, L. D. (1991). Советская музыка. История и современность [Soviet music: history and modernity] (in Russian). Moscow: Tutorial. ISBN 978-5-7140-0244-1. Archived from the original on 18 July 2022.
- Oliynyk, Svitlana (2012). "П'ять прелюдій для фортепіано Б. Лятошинського: образно-тематична концепція циклу" [Five preludes for piano by B. Lyatoshynsky: a figurative-thematic concept of the cycle]. Contemporary Music in the Modern World: A Collection of Scientific Papers (in Ukrainian). Zhytomyr State University Library: 29–31.
- Pastelyak (2004). "Трансформація поемності у фортепіанній творчості Бориса Лятошинського" [The Transformation of poetry in the piano works of Borys Lyatoshynsky]. Scientific Notes of Volodymyr Hnatyuk Ternopil National Pedagogical University and the Peter Tchaikovsky National Music Academy of Ukraine: 30–37.
- Pijarowska, Aleksandra, ed. (2021). Music - the Cultural Bridge: Essence, Contexts, References (PDF). Wrocław: Karol Lipiński Academy of Music. ISBN 978-836547-323-3.
