= Shchors =

Shchors may refer to:

- Mykola Shchors (1895–1919), Ukrainian communist and military leader.
- Shchors (film), a 1939 film about Nikolay Shchors
- Shchors (opera), a 1937 opera by Borys Lyatoshynsky
- Snovsk, a city in Ukraine known as Shchors 1935–2016
