= Volodymyr Kozhukhar =

Ukrainian conductor (1941–2022)

- Володимир Кожухар
- Born: Volodymyr Markovych Kozhukhar; 16 March 1941; Vinnytsia, Ukrainian SSR, Soviet Union
- Died: 3 December 2022 (aged 81)
- Occupations: Conductor; academic teacher
- Organizations: Symphony Orchestra of the Ukrainian SSR; Stanislavski and Nemirovich-Danchenko Music Theatre; Gnesin Music and Pedagogy Institute; National Opera of Ukraine; Kyiv Conservatory
- Awards: Medal "For Distinguished Labor" (1980); People's Artist of the RSFSR (1985); People's Artist of Ukraine (1993); Order of Merit of Ukraine, 3rd class (2001); Order of Merit of Ukraine, 2nd class (2006); Order of Merit of Ukraine, 1st class (2016)

Volodymyr Markovych Kozhukhar (Ukrainian: Володимир Маркович Кожухар; 16 March 1941 – 3 December 2022) was a Soviet and Ukrainian conductor and academic teacher who focused on opera. Most notably, he conducted and taught in Kyiv and Moscow, among other places.

His first post was chief conductor of the Symphony Orchestra of the Ukrainian SSR, producing several recordings. In Moscow, he was chief conductor of the Stanislavski and Nemirovich-Danchenko Music Theatre from 1977 and professor of orchestral conducting at the Gnesin Music and Pedagogy Institute from 1978. In Kyiv, he directed the National Opera of Ukraine from 1989 to 2011, and taught at the Kyiv Conservatory from 1993. He conducted both internal operatic repertoire and stage works by Ukrainian composers, and took the opera company on tours throughout Europe, Canada, and Japan.

Kozhukhar received the Order of Merit of Ukraine, 1st class in 2016.

== Biography ==
=== Youth and education ===
Kozhukhar was born in Vinnytsia. According to a 2011 interview, Kozhukhar was drawn to conducting at the age of 18, when he was enrolled at the Kyiv Conservatory as an instrumentalist who also composed music as a hobby. He also spent much time studying orchestral scores, which caught the attention of fellow students and, later, school administrative staff. Despite being invited to study conducting, Kozhukhar initially declined the offer. His teachers persuaded him to reconsider, telling him that "a single orchestral instrument [was] not enough" for him.

He proceeded to study conducting with Mikhail Kanerstein at the Kyiv Conservatory and graduated from there in 1963. Kozhukhar also continued post-graduate studies in conducting with Gennady Rozhdestvensky at the Moscow Conservatory.

=== Early career ===
Kozhukhar began conducting professionally in 1964. He became conductor of the Symphony Orchestra of the Ukrainian SSR (later State Symphony Orchestra of Ukraine), and in 1967 their chief conductor.

=== Opera and ballet ===
Kozhukhar conducted at the Kyiv Opera and Ballet Theatre from 1973 to 1977. From 1977 to 1988, he was chief conductor of the Stanislavski and Nemirovich-Danchenko Music Theatre in Moscow. In 1989, he became chief conductor of the National Opera of Ukraine in Kyiv, where he led classical repertoire, and also works by Ukrainian composers including Lysenko's Taras Bulba, Lyatoshynsky's The Golden Hoop, and Yevhen Stankovych's 2001 ballet Vikings. He conducted Rodion Shchedrin's Carmen Suite, written in 1967 for Shchedrin's wife, the ballerina Maya Plisetskaya, and scored for string orchestra with percussion; the choreography was by Alberto Alonso. A reviewer noted that he conducted with all qualities necessary for the "charged, erotic, dramatic score". In 2019, Kozhukhar programed the work with Rimsky-Korsakov's Scheherazade, wherein the choreography by Michel Fokine was revived. Kozhukhar took part in a gala concert, Masterpieces of World Music. The company toured Europe, Canada, Lebanon, and Japan. Performances that he led on tours included Tchaikovsky's Mazeppa in Paris in 1992, Verdi's Nabucco at the Strasbourg Music Festival of 1993, and Shostakovich's Katerina Izmailova in Naples. He held the post until 2011.

=== Teaching ===
Kozhukhar taught opera and orchestral conducting at the Kyiv Conservatory from 1965 to 1977, orchestral conducting at the Gnesin Music and Pedagogy Institute in Moscow from 1978 to 1988, and was a professor at the Kyiv Conservatory from 1993.

=== Personal life ===
Kozhukhar had acquired the nickname "The Tracker" from violinist Oleh Krysa because, according to him, a soloist could not get away from him." Later he was also known as "The Computer", a nickname which Kozhukhar said he enjoyed:

Keeping in mind that a conductor has got to think faster than everyone else sitting before him, I am not offended [by the name]. Fooling me is impossible. I hear everything. I tell performers that the only times I make no comments [during rehearsal] are: if they are brilliant or if they are hopeless.

Kozhukhar died on 3 December 2022, at age 81.

== Recordings ==
Kozhukhar recorded works by Ukrainian composers such as Borys Lyatoshynsky, Andriy Shtoharenko, Lev Kolodub, Vitaliy Hubarenko, and Myroslav Skoryk. In 1970, he recorded Heorhiy Maiboroda’s Symphony No. 2 (1952, revised 1966) with the Ukrainian SSR State Symphony Orchestra. He recorded two symphonies by Levko Revutsky: the Symphony No. 1 in A major, Op. 3 (1916–21, rev. 1957), combined with the Maiboroday symphony in 1970, and the Symphony No. 2 in E major, Op. 12 (1926-7, rev. 1940 and 1970) in 1973. He recorded Serdar Mukhatov's Symphony No. 2 in 1981.

== Awards ==
Kozhukhar was awarded the Order of Merit of Ukraine of the first degree in 2016.
