= Hafiz =

Hafiz (Arabic: حافظ) or Hafez may refer to:

- Hafiz (Quran), a term used by Muslims for people who have completely memorized the Qur'an
  - Al-Ḥafīẓ, one of the names of God in Islam, meaning "the Ever-Preserving/Guardian/All-Watching/ Protector"

== People ==
- Hafiz (name), including a list of people with the name
- Hafez, a 14th-century Persian mystic and poet. Sometimes credited as "Hafiz" or "Hafiz of Shiraz"
- Hafiz, starring role played by actor Ronald Colman in Kismet (1944 film)
- Abdel Halim Hafez, Egyptian singer
- Hafiz Abdulrahman, Sudanese flutist
- Hafiz Shirazi, Persian 14th-century poet

== Places ==
- Hafez, Iran, a village in East Azerbaijan Province, Iran
- Tomb of Hafez, one of two memorial structures in Shiraz, Iran, erected in memory of the Persian poet Hafez

== Others ==
- Muhafiz (disambiguation)
- Hifazat (disambiguation)
- Hafez (opera), 2013 Persian-language opera by Behzad Abdi
- Hafiz (horse), French Thoroughbred racehorse
- Hafís (drift ice), work for choir and orchestra by Jón Leifs
- Al-Hafez, Salafi Islamist channel from Egypt.
- Hafez Awards, an annual awards ceremony which is held honoring cinematic achievements in Iranian cinema
- Khuda Hafiz, a parting phrase
