= Kozhukhar =

Kozhukhar (Ukrainian: Кожухар) is a surname of Ukrainian origin, meaning a producer of fur coats. Notable people with the surname include:

- Andriy Kozhukhar (born 1999), Ukrainian footballer
- Volodymyr Kozhukhar (1941–2022), Soviet-Ukrainian conductor and music educator
