= Hafiz Pasha =

Hafız Pasha may refer to:

- Hadım Hafız Ahmed Pasha (died 1613), Ottoman governor of Egypt (1590–94)
- Hafız Ahmed Pasha (1564–1632), Ottoman grand vizier (1625–26, 1631–32)
- Hafiz Mustafa Agha (died 1805), Ottoman commander active in Serbia
- Mehmed Hafiz Pasha (fl. 1892), Ottoman governor of Basra (1892)
- Hafiz Mehmed Pasha, the Circassian (died 1866), Ottoman soldier and statesman
- Hafiz Mehmed Pasha, Ottoman governor of Kosovo (1894–99)
- Hafuz Pasha (fl. 1876–1900), Ottoman governor of Skopje
- Hafiz Hakki Pasha (1878–1915), Ottoman general
- Hafeez A. Pasha, Pakistani economist

== See also ==
- Hafiz (disambiguation)
- Pasha, a higher rank in the Ottoman Empire political and military system, typically granted to governors, generals, dignitaries and others
