= Muhafiz =

Muhafiz or Mohafiz may refer to:

- Mohafiz (vehicle), an internal security vehicle designed and manufactured at Heavy Industries Taxila (HIT) in Pakistan
- PNS Muhafiz, a Pakistani minesweeper
- In Custody (film), also known as Muhafiz, a 1993 British-Indian film by Ismail Merchant, based on the novel of the same name by Anita Desai
- Muhafiz (1998), a Pakistani film
- Muḥāfiẓ, the head of a Muhafazah (administrative division) in many Arab countries

== See also ==
- Hafiz (disambiguation)
- Muhafiz Khan Mosque, Ahmedabad, Gujarat, India
