= Rumi (opera) =

Opera by Behzad Abdi

Rumi is a Persian-language opera by Iranian composer Behzad Abdi to a libretto by puppet theatre director Behrouz Gharibpour. The opera combines Persian traditional dastgāh modal system and sama dance with Western music. The libretto is based on the story of Shams and Rumi.

== Recording ==
- Rumi – Maliheh Moradi, Mohammad Motamedi, Homayun Shajarian, Hosein Alishapour and Ali Khodaei, Mohammadreza Sadeghi, Credo Chamber Choir National Symphony Orchestra of Ukraine Vladimir Sirenko 2018
