= Behzad Abdi =

Iranian composer

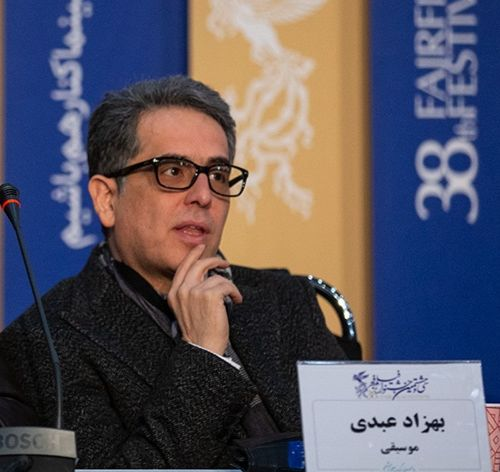

Background information
- Born: 1973 (age 51–52); Tehran
- Origin: Iran
- Occupation: Composer of opera

Behzad Abdi (born 1973, Tehran, Iran) is an Iranian composer of opera, film, and television music.

Abdi studied setar and Iranian traditional music.

His opera "Rumi" from 2009, based on the life of Rumi, with libretto by Behrouz Gharibourm, and with Mohammad Motamadi, has been released on the UK label, Naxos.

Abdi is currently based in Kyiv, Ukraine.

== Selected works ==
- Rumi (opera)
- Hafez (opera) 2013
