= Symphony No. 3 (Lyatoshynsky) =

Musical work by Borys Lyatoshynsky

- by Borys Lyatoshynsky
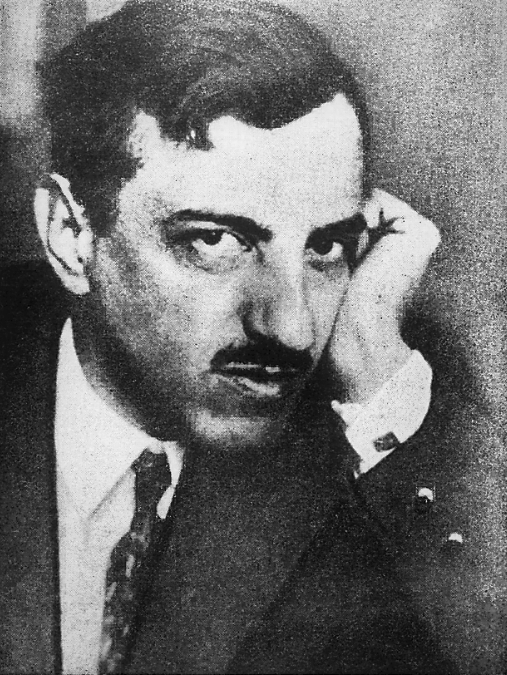
- Borys Lyatoshynsky
- Key: B minor
- Composed: 1951, revised 1954
- Movements: 4

Premiere
- Date: 23 October 1951
- Location: Kyiv
- Conductor: Natan Rakhlin (open rehearsal)
- Performers: Kyiv Philharmonic

The Symphony No. 3 in B minor by the Ukrainian composer Borys Lyatoshynsky (Ukrainian: Бори́с Миколáйович Лятоши́нський;) was completed in 1951, with the final movement themed "Peace will conquer war." The symphony was first performed in Kyiv on 23 October 1951, by the Kyiv Philharmonic, conducted by Natan Rakhlin. Criticised by the Soviet authorities on ideological grounds, the composer was forced to rework the symphony, and to remove the subtitle of the finale. The first performance of the revised version took place in Leningrad (now Saint Petersburg) in 1955.

== History ==
The Ukrainian composer Borys Lyatoshynsky began work on his Symphony No. 3 in B minor in 1948, following the end of World War II. He completed the work in 1951. He subtitled the final movement: "Peace will conquer war."

The symphony was first performed on 23 October 1951 in Kyiv, by the Kyiv Philharmonic, conducted by Natan Rakhlin, at a concert of the plenum of the board of the Union of Composers of Ukraine. According to the memoirs of contemporaries, at the premiere of the work, the audience gave Lyatoshynsky a standing ovation. In his memoirs about Lyatoshynsky, the composer Anatoliy Kos-Anatolsky wrote: "At one of the compositional plenums, in the 50s in Kyiv, the third symphony of B. Lyatoshynsky was performed. This work in the first edition made a deep but slightly gloomy impression on me, and I imagined the author as a withdrawn, strict, and dismal person."

Despite this, shortly after the premiere, the Union of Composers of Ukraine condemned the work as "anti-people" and called it "formalistic rubbish that needs to be burned." The symphony, written shortly after the Second World War, contained the epigraph "Peace Shall Defeat War," and the final of the symphony in the original edition was perceived to be tragic, not victorious. The composer was accused of interpreting the war theme "not as a Soviet supporter of peace, but as a bourgeois pacifist." Following this official criticism of the symphony, Lyatoshynsky became depressed and wrote, "As a composer I am dead, and I do not know when I will be resurrected."

The composer was forced to rework the symphony, and remove the subtitle, in order for the work to be performed in public again. In particular, Lyatoshynsky was told to replace the finale with one that sounded victorious and optimistic. The first performance of the revised version of the symphony took place in Leningrad in 1955, performed by the Leningrad Philharmonic Orchestra conducted by Yevgeny Mravinsky. The choice of venue was deliberate—as after the symphony had been "approved" in the Russian SSR, the composer could no longer be persecuted for this work in Kyiv. In addition, Mravinsky's authority was also a kind of defense for the work. After the performance of the symphony in the new edition, the attitude towards it suddenly changed, and it was dubbed a significant work for Ukrainian symphonic music. It was in this version that the symphony continued to be performed for decades, until ideological taboos were lifted after the collapse of the USSR. In the original version, the symphony was performed by conductors Volodymyr Sirenko and Igor Blazhkov.

Lyatoshynsky linked his symphony to his creed as a composer, stating, "A composer whose voice does not read the heart of the nation has less than no value. I always felt myself to be a national composer in the fullest sense of the word, and I will remain a national composer, proving this not through words but deeds!"

The generally accepted subtitles for the entire symphony, "Peace shall defeat war" and "To the Twenty-fifth Anniversary of the October Revolution," may not be correct, according to the music critic Dave Billinge, who maintains the epitaph could be referring only to the finale, and the latter subtitle is chronologically nonsensical.

== Instrumentation ==
The symphony is scored for the following orchestra:

Woodwinds

1 piccolo
3 flutes
2 oboes
1 cor anglais
3 clarinets in B♭
1 bass clarinet
2 bassoons
1 contrabassoon

Brass

4 horns in F
4 trumpets in B♭
3 trombones
1 tuba

Percussion

timpani

1 bass drum
1 snare drum
1 triangle
cymbals
1 tam-tam
1 glockenspiel
1 xylophone

Strings

2 harps

violins I, II
violas
cellos
double basses

== Form ==
The Soviet musicologist Mikola Gordiychuk described the genre of Lyatoshynsky's Symphony No. 3 as a symphonic drama. Lyatoshynsky used the simple and melodic character of a Ukrainian folk song to offset the complex musical harmony of the music. It is Lyatoshynsky's only four-movement symphony; the three others all have three movements.

The symphony is in four movements, marked as follows:

1. Andante maestoso — Poco meno mosso — Tempo iniziale — Allegro impetuoso — Pochissimo meno mosso — Andante — Sostenuto e tranquillo — Più mosso — Allegro — Meno mosso — Allegro — Meno mosso — Allegro — Meno mosso — Andante — Più mosso — Allegro — Meno mosso — Andante — Più mosso — Allegro — Meno mosso — Andante — Più mosso — Allegro — Molto sostenuto e tranquillo — Allegro maestoso — Allegro maestoso
2. Andante con moto — Meno mosso — Tranquillo — Andante con moto — Minacciando — Poco meno mosso — Meno mosso — Tranquillo — Lento
3. Allegro feroce — Poco meno mosso — Allegro molto — Allegro feroce (Poco meno mosso) — Più mosso
4. Allegro risoluto ma non troppo mosso — Poco più mosso — Pochissimo più tranquillo — Più mosso — Ancora più mosso — Poco meno mosso, ma sempre allegro — Poco meno mosso e maestoso assai — Più tranquillo ma sempre allegro — Poco meno mosso, marciale assai — Maestoso — Doppio movimento — Tempo precedente — Doppio movimento — Trionfant

The work is fundamentally monothematic, and based on the material of the first theme of the first movement. This theme reappears in the second movement as an "ostinato background", at the beginning of the third movement, and during the finale. Lyatoshynsky used polyphonic techniques for presenting and unfolding the material: themes are superimposed on each other, transformed, and complicated by imitations, canons, and fugato. He also used polyphony in the exposition sections.

=== I. Andante maestoso ===
Lyatoshynsky Symphony No. 3 (opening bars of the 1st movement')

Lyatoshynsky - Symphony No. 3 (opening)

Both the first and last movements of the symphony are written in sonata form. The opening bars introduce the first theme, played by the brass, which has menace and implied violence

The second theme is derived from a Ukrainian folk song, "Sorry for sorrow, longing for longing". The simple and melodic character of song is used by Lyatoshynsky to offset the complex harmony of the movement. It follows what the musicologist Andrew Burn has described as a "turbulent, impetuous forces of destruction" and is heard on low flutes and bassoons.

The initial fast tempo returns, and the ideas of the introduction are developed in such a way as to suggest a great struggle is taking place. A series of climaxes are followed by the return of the folksong melody is heard once more. After an enormously climatic moment in the movement, the folksong reappears. The music then dies down without reaching a conclusion.

=== II Andante con moto ===
The general form of the second movement is divided into three sections (A → B → A). It begins with a gentle ostinato, echoing the theme from the beginning of the symphony, which changes into a melody for the cellos. The return of the folksong theme is followed by the return of the ostinato, which slowly becomes terrifyingly warlike, as more instruments are added. There is an abrupt change in mood as the folksong theme is reprised. After another warlike climax, the music finally subsides.

=== III Allegro feroce ===
In the scherzo, the composer synthesized a model of the sonata form with three parts (with the central part being a trio) Burn describes the third movement as bringing to mind “the desolation of the battlefield”. He argues that the symphony’s most remarkable thematic transformation occurs at the beginning of the trio, when the folk song "Sorry for sorrow, longing for longing" becomes sad and delicate, but later changes to become waltz-like. The scherzo returns before the movement reaches a climax, The music then fades.

=== IV Allegro risoluto ma non troppo mosso ===
Gordiychuk described the revised finale as being characterized by "festive and picturesque straightforwardness of the plan, largely devoid of the drama that marked all the previous parts of the work".

The mood conveyed by the finale conveys the achievement of peace and enlightenment. The symphony’s opening leitmotif is transformed to become resolute and positive. The movement’s second melodic theme also originated from the first movement. The development section is martial. The symphony concludes by gaining momentum, culminating in the joyful return of the folk music heard in the first movement, amid the sound of bells.

== See also ==
- List of compositions by Borys Lyatoshynsky

== Sources ==
- Burn, Andrew (2019). "Lyatoshynsky: Symphony No. 3/Grazhyna" (CD notes) (in English, French, and German). Chandos. pp. 7–12.
- Gordiychuk, M.M. (1969). Українська радянська симфонічна музика [Ukrainian Soviet Symphonic Music] (in Ukrainian). Institute of Art History, Folklore and Ethnography (Academy of Sciences of Ukraine RSR). OCLC 829692331.
- Novakovič, Miroslava (2020). "Модерні Горизонти Музичного Світу Бориса Лятошинського (до 125-ліття Б. Лятошинського)" [Modern Horizons of Borys Lyatoshynsky's music world] (PDF). Musical Ukraine (in Ukrainian). 35 (1). Kyiv: 65–174.

=== Further reading ===
- Yefimenko, A. (2016). "Третя Симфонія Бориса Лятошинського: Оксана Линів про перше виконання твору в Німеччині з Бамберзьким симфонічним оркестром" [Borys Lyatoshynsky's Third Symphony: Oksana Liniv on the first performance of a work in Germany with the Bamberg Symphony Orchestra]. Ukrainian Music (in Ukrainian). 20 (2). MV Lysenko Lviv National Academy of Music Department of Musical Medieval Studies and Ukrainian Studies. ISSN 2224-0926.
