= Hifazat =

Hifazat may refer to:

- Hifazat (1973 film), an Indian Hindi-language drama film by K. S. R. Das
- Hifazat (1987 film), an Indian Hindi-language action-drama film by Prayag Raj, starring Anil Kapoor and Madhuri Dixit
- Hifazat (1990 film), starring Abid Ali

== See also ==
- Hafiz (disambiguation)
