= Hafez (opera) =

Persian-language opera

Hafez is a two-act, Persian-language, opera by Iranian composer Behzad Abdi to a libretto by Behrouz Gharibpour. It is the second puppet opera by Abdi after the earlier Rumi (2009). The opera is based on the Persian mystic poet Hafez and the path towards preserving his writings from the hands of the Persian government.

The opera is structured into two acts, seven scenes in the first and six scenes in the second.

== Recording ==
- Hafez : Mohammad Motamedi, Hossein Alishapour, Babak Sabouri, Mohammad Zakerhossein, Ali Zandevakili, Credo Chamber Choir, National Symphony Orchestra of Ukraine, Vladimir Sirenko Naxos, DDD, 2014, 2021
