= National Symphony Orchestra of Ukraine =

The National Symphony Orchestra of Ukraine (Ukrainian: Національний Симфонічний Оркестр України) is one of the principal orchestras of Ukraine.

It was founded in 1918 as Ukrainian State Symphony Orchestra. Nathan Rachlin conducted the orchestra from 1937 until 1962. Subsequent directors included Stephan Turchak, Volodymyr Kozhukhar, Fyodor Glushchenko, and Igor Blazhkov. The American conductor Theodore Kuchar is the current artistic director, while the chief conductor has been Volodymyr Sirenko since 1999.

The orchestra was on tour in cities across the United States in 2017.

A tour of the United Kingdom (the orchestra's first visit there since 2001) was announced in 2022 to take place the following year (featuring soloists Antonii Baryshevskyi and Aleksey Semenenko), with the aim of promoting Ukrainian musical talent and culture amidst the Russian invasion of the country; two members of the orchestra were absent due to being conscripted to the military, and rehearsals and preparatory performances in Kyiv took place under restricted conditions.

Similarly, NSOU visited Taiwan for the first time in September 2023 and performed concerts in 3 cities. They opened their tour with a performance at Kaohsiung City Government Administration Center with Ukrainian National Anthem and a classic Taiwanese song. Their performances include "Grazhyna" Symphonic Poem by Borys Lyatoshynsky, Piano Concerto No. 1 by Frederic Chopin and Mazepa Symphonic Poem by Franz Liszt.
