= Taras Bulba (opera) =

1924 opera by Mykola Lysenko

- Opera by Mykola Lysenko
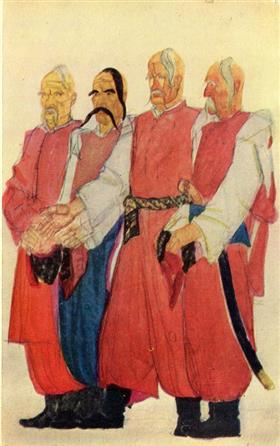
- Costume designs for Lysenko's opera by Fedir Krychevsky
- Librettist: Mykhailo Starytsky
- Language: Ukrainian
- Based on: Taras Bulba by Nikolai Gogol
- Premiere: 1955 (present-day version); Kiev Opera House

Taras Bulba is an opera in four acts by the Ukrainian composer Mykola Lysenko. The libretto was written for Lysenko by his cousin, the playwright Mykhailo Starytsky, and is based on the novella Taras Bulba, written by the Russian novelist Nikolai Gogol, himself of Ukrainian origin. The story is about a Cossack who discovers his son has betrayed his people, and kills him.

The opera, which was left unrevised and unperformed at the time of the composer's death in 1912, was first produced in 1924. Present-day performances are based on revised versions of the opera made during the 1930s and 1950s.

== Composition ==
The Ukrainian composer Mykola Lysenko worked on his opera Taras Bulba from 1880 to 1891. Intent on elevating Ukrainian culture to a level commensurate with European standards, he refused to allow the opera to be translated, and insisted that all performances of the work should be sung in Ukrainian. This prevented performances of the work from taking place during his lifetime. Lysenko maintained the opera might be too ambitious for Ukrainian opera houses, but it was eventually performed for the first time in Moscow during the Soviet period, after having been reorchestrated by the Ukrainian composer Levko Revutsky.

Lysenko was reputedly a descendant of the 17th century Cossack leader Vovgura Lys, so Taras Bulba may have had a special significance for him. Shortly after completing the work, he played the score to Tchaikovsky, who reportedly "listened to the whole opera with rapt attention, from time to time voicing approval and admiration. He particularly liked the passages in which national, Ukrainian, touches were most vivid... Tchaikovsky embraced Lysenko and congratulated him on his talented composition."

== Performance history ==
A piano score of Taras Bulba was published in 1913. The prelude to the fourth act was first given at a concert in Kyiv in 1914, when the performance was conducted by the Russian composer Reinhold Glière. The first performance of the full opera took place in 1924 in Kharkiv. This performance was a failure, but others were more successful, and further productions took place in Kyiv in 1927, and in Tbilisi in 1930. These performances led to the work being revised in 1937 before being performed in Moscow – the libretto was revised by the Ukrainian poet Maksym Rylsky, and Lysenko's pupil Revutsky and the Ukrainian composer Borys Lyatoshynsky collaborated to re-orchestrate the work. This new version of the opera was criticized for departing too far from Lysenko's original intentions. It was not until after World War II that Rylsky, Revutsky, and Lyatoshynsky reworked the opera once more, producing the version of the work that is nowadays performed, and which was premiered in Kiev in 1955. The opera is part of the repertoire of the National Opera of Ukraine, based in Kyiv, which also performed it at the Hessisches Staatstheater Wiesbaden in Germany in 1982, Dresden's Semperoper in 1987, and in Zagreb the following year. Much of Lysenko's original orchestration has been lost. The National Opera of Ukraine has traditionally performed the opera at the end of each operatic season in Kyiv.

The work's perceived structural defects may to a large extent be because Lysenko was never able to adjust the work after hearing it being performed. The opera marks an advance on the composer's earlier works, such as Natalka Poltavka and Utoplena. Its folklore and nationalistic elements, which are more closely integrated in a continuous musical framework, show that Lysenko was influenced by Tchaikovsky.

Problems relating to the opera include the episodic nature of the libretto, the dances, patriotic marches and choruses, which are detached from the plot, and a long scene in the third act, when Kudryiaha is chosen to lead the Cossacks, but then does not reappear. Other issues include the compression of the historical events that the opera is based upon into a single scene in the opera, and the lack of emotional or musical transition from the death of an important character to the triumphant (and unsung) final scene.

Amongst those who have sung the title role, Taras, is the Ukrainian singer Borys Hmyria, who also featured in a recording of the opera.

== Roles ==
Role	Voice type
Taras Bulba	bass
Ostap, his son	baritone
Andriy, his son	tenor
Nastya, his wife	contralto
Maryltsya, daughter of the Polish governor of Dubno	soprano
Governor	bass
Kobzar	tenor
Chorus: citizens, Cossacks, etc

== Synopsis ==
Taras Bulba is set in Kyiv, Taras's village in Ukraine, the Zaporozhian Sich, and Dubno, in the 17th century, at a time when Poland sought supremacy in the region. This synopsis is based on the version which was first produced in 1955. The opera is preceded by an orchestral overture.

=== Act I ===
The opera opens in Kyiv, which is occupied by the Polish szlachta, whose servants disperse a crowd listening to the song of a kobzar, or Ukrainian bard. Taras Bulba leaves his sons Ostap and Andriy at a monastery to be educated. Andriy has already been impressed by a Polish girl he has seen (who turns out to be Maryltsya, daughter of the Polish governor of Dubno). Ostap encourages the kobzar to sing a patriotic song; this angers the Poles, and in a scuffle the bard is killed.

=== Act II ===
Taras's village. Ostap and Andriy return from Kiev and greet their mother Nastya. Bulba's friend Tovkach tells of the war being unleashed throughout Ukraine by the Poles. Despite his wife's protestations, Taras determines to take his sons to the Sich, the Cossack stronghold, so as to participate in the struggles. Nastya collapses.

=== Act III ===
The Sich. Taras successfully encourages the idle residents to rouse themselves for battle. Andriy and Ostap look forward to this; when Andriy has brief forebodings, Ostap promises always to support him. Drumbeats summon a council (rada) of the Cossacks; with Taras's support, they elect a new, more pugnacious hetman, Kyrdiaha, to lead them. He declares his intention to go into battle.

=== Act IV ===
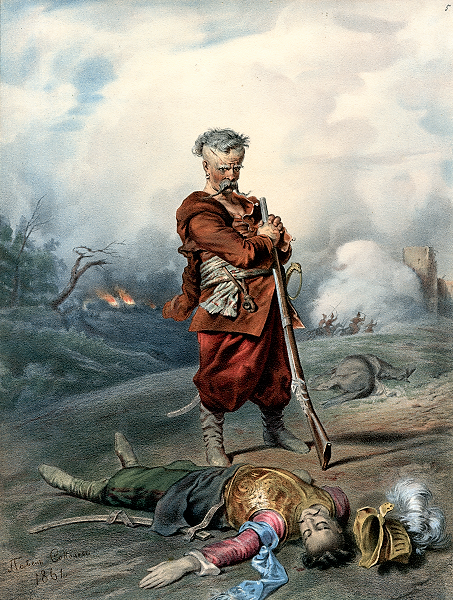
Pyotr Sokolov's depiction of the Cossack Taras Bulba, standing over his dead son

==== Scene 1 ====
The Cossack camp. The Cossacks are besieging Dubno, where Maryltsya's father is governor. She has sent her Tatar maid to find Andriy, and to beg his help as the inhabitants are suffering from starvation. Andriy agrees to help and, with the maid, takes food into the town through a secret passage.

==== Scene 2 ====
Inside the castle. Andriy and Maryltsya express their love for each other. Andriy asks the Governor for her hand; the szlachta object on class grounds. On the advice of his priest, the Governor considers it expedient to allow Andriy to marry, and appoints him a Colonel in the Polish Army.

==== Scene 3 ====
The Cossack camp. Taras hears news that the Tatars have destroyed the Sich. Then an escaping prisoner tells him of Andriy's desertion. Troops under Andriy make a sortie from the castle, and Taras kills his own son for his treason. Ostap's feelings are torn and he sings a lament for his brother.

==== Scene 4 ====
In a purely orchestral scene Taras and Ostap lead the Cossacks to victory against the Poles and take over the town of Dubno.

This ending significantly differs from Gogol's original in which first Ostap and then Taras are captured by the Poles and given cruel public executions. Many other significant features of the novel – notably the equivocal behaviour of Taras and the Cossacks to local Jews – are also omitted (see article Taras Bulba).

== Sources ==
- Baley, Virko; Hrytsa, Sofia (2001). "Ukraine". Grove Music Online (8th ed.). Oxford University Press. ISBN 978-1-56159-263-0. (subscription, Wikilibrary access, or UK public library membership required)
- Sadie, Julie Anne; Sadie, Stanley (2005). Calling on the Composer: A Guide to European Composer Houses and Museums. New Haven, Connecticut: Yale University Press. ISBN 978-0-300-10750-0.
