= Shchors (opera) =

Ukrainian opera by Lyatoshynsky

- Opera by Borys Lyatoshynsky
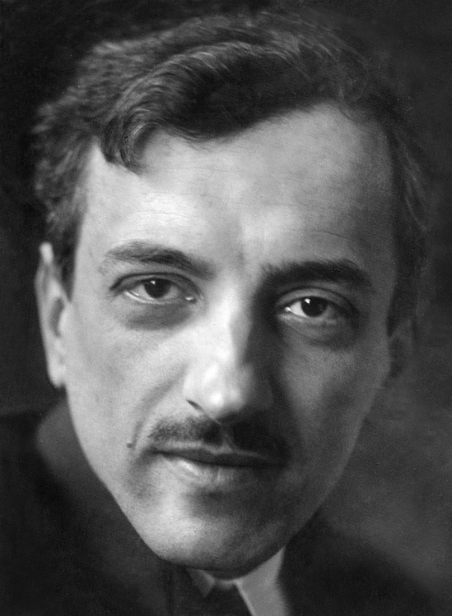
- The composer
- Librettist: Ivan Kocherga; Maksym Rylsky
- Language: Ukrainian
- Based on: life of Mykola Shchors
- Premiere: 1 September 1938; Kyiv Opera House

Shchors (Ukrainian: Щорс; also known as Commander) is an opera in five acts by the Ukrainian composer Borys Lyatoshynsky. It was written in 1937–1938 to a libretto by Ivan Kocherga and Maksym Rylsky. The main hero, Mykola Shchors, was a military figure originally from Chernihiv Oblast. The opera was first staged at the Kyiv Opera House on 1 September 1938.

== History ==
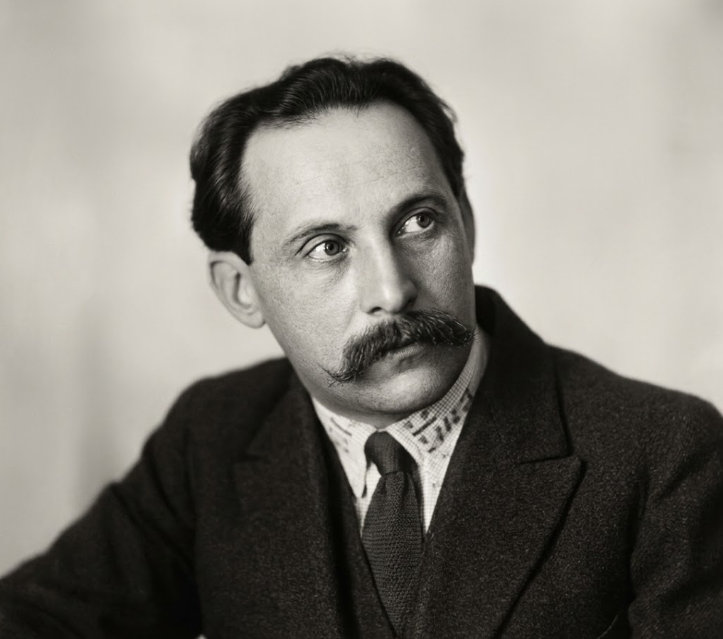
Maksym Rylsky, one of the librettists

The Ukrainian composer Borys Lyatoshynsky composed Shchors from 1937 as his second opera, after The Golden Ring. The libretto was written by Ivan Kocherga and Maksym Rylsky. Lyatoshynsky chose Ukrainian themes for both operas. The main hero is Mykola Shchors, a military figure originally from the Ukrainian city of Snovsk, who took an active part in the Ukrainian–Soviet War on the side of the Soviet Red Army, and who died in battle against the troops of the Ukrainian Galician Army.

The opera was first staged at the Kyiv Opera House on 1 September 1938, conducted by Vladimir Dranishnikov, and remained in the repertoire of the house.

== Synopsis ==
Shchors consists of five acts.

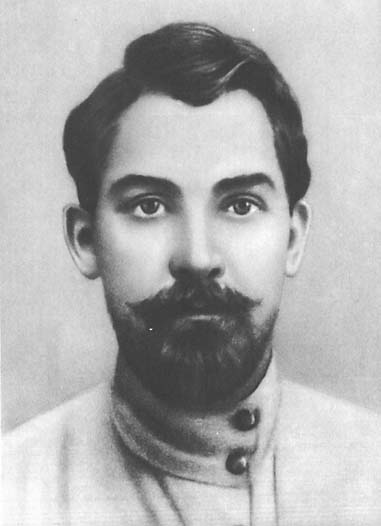
Mykola Shchors, the hero of the opera

=== Act 1 ===
The villagers meet Shchors. Shchors sings an aria in which he assures the audience that "the wise Lenin is leading us to the goal" and calls on the peasants to join the armed forces.

=== Act 2 ===
In a dilapidated manor house, where a hospital for the sick is located, Ukrainian military soldier Zapara tells a paramedic about the need to stop the Bolshevik aggressors. Zapara leaves, and Shchors appears in his place with associates—they discuss supply problems, Shchors expresses concern about the large number of sick people.

=== Act 3 ===
Hryts, a Red Army soldier, agitates the peasants to join Vladimir Lenin's side. Suddenly, a German officer appears and, with the help of soldiers, detains Hryts. Soon, a detachment of Red Army soldiers arrives and forces the German and Ukrainian soldiers to retreat.

=== Act 4 ===
Shchors' henchman Liya complains that Petliura is ready to "sell the people to the interventionists" and glorifies the name of Lenin. Soon, Shchors appears, who glorifies not only Lenin, but also Stalin, and calls to prepare an attack on Kyiv.

=== Act 5 ===
The focus is on Shchors and his henchmen fighting against Ukrainian troops. In this battle, Shchors dies with the words "Forward, gods, our victory." Lenin...", after which the choir mournfully sings "The Cossack is carried and the horse is led." In the second picture, the corpse of the commander is sent by truck to the sounds of a Bogun song.
