= The Golden Ring (opera) =

Music-drama in four acts by Borys Lyatoshynsky

- Opera by Borys Lyatoshynsky
- Librettist: Jacob Mamontov
- Language: Ukrainian
- Based on: short story by Ivan Franko
- Premiere: 26 March 1930; Odessa

The Golden Ring (Ukrainian: Золотий обруч, romanized: Zolotyy obruch), also called Zachar Berkut, is an opera in four acts and nine scenes by the Ukrainian composer Borys Lyatoshynsky. The libretto was written by the poet Jacob Mamontov, and was based on Zachar Berkut, a short story by the Ukrainian writer Ivan Franko. The work was premiered in Odessa on 26 March 1930. Written in 1929, it was the earliest music-drama in Ukrainian.

== Sources ==
- Baley, Virko (2001). "Lyatoshyns′ky, Borys Mykolayovych". Grove Music Online (8th ed.). Oxford University Press. ISBN 978-1-56159-263-0.

=== Further reading ===
- Baley, Virko (2002). "Zolotyy obruch ('The Golden Ring')". Grove Music Online (8th ed.). Oxford University Press. ISBN 978-1-56159-263-0.
- Izvarina, Elena (2016). "Опера "Золотий Обруч" Б. Лятошинського В Контексті Універсалій Культури: Зміна Смислів Інтерпретації" [B. Lyatoshynsky's opera ‘’The Golden Ring’’ in the context of the universals of culture: changing the meanings of interpretation] (PDF). The Culturology Ideas (in Ukrainian and English) (9): 123–127. ISSN 2311-9489.
