= Symphony No. 1 (Lyatoshynsky) =

Musical work by Borys Lyatoshynsky

- by Borys Lyatoshynsky
- Key: A major
- Opus: 2
- Composed: 1918/19
- Movements: 3

Premiere
- Date: 1919
- Location: Kyiv
- Conductor: Reinhold Glière

Symphony No. 1 in A major, Op. 2, is a symphony by Borys Lyatoshynsky, written during 1918 and 1919.

It has been suggested by the music writer Gregor Tassie that his First Symphony (1918–1919), is the earliest symphony to be composed in Ukraine after Maxim Berezovsky. More tuneful and Scriabinesque in comparison with his four other symphonies, it was written as his graduation composition at a time when he had become influenced by the music of Scrabin and Richard Wagner. It was conducted in 1919 by Lyatoshynsky's teacher, the composer Reinhold Glière.

The symphony is described in the 1999 edition of The Penguin Guide to Compact Discs as "a well-crafted, confident score" that "abounds in contrapuntal elaboration and abundant orchestral rhetoric". A similar vision of the war to Nikolai Myaskovsky's Symphony No. 5 was expressed in the symphony. The reflective second movement is redeemed by a finale that is, according to the music historian Ferrucio Tammaro, "not only dynamic, but even heroic, in close conformity with the tastes of emerging Soviet symphonism".

== Movements ==
The symphony is written for an orchestra consisting of 3 flutes (3rd also piccolo), 2 oboes, English horn, 3 clarinets in A (3rd also bass clarinet in B♭), 2 bassoons, contrabassoon, 4 horns in F, 3 trumpets in B♭, 3 trombones, tuba, timpani, triangle, cymbals, tam-tam, glockenspiel, harp, and strings.

There are three movements:

1. Allegro non troppo un poco agitato
2. Molto lento
3. Allegro energico

== Sources ==
- Dytyniak, Maria (1986). Українські Композитори [Ukrainian Composers] (in Ukrainian). Edmonton, Alberta: Canadian Institute of Ukrainian Studies.
- Greenfield, Edward; March, Ivan; Layton, Robert (1999). The Penguin Guide to Compact Discs. London; New York: Penguin Books. ISBN 978-01404-6-887-8 – via Internet Archive.
- Tammaro, Ferrucio (2017). "War Symphonies and Peace Symphonies: Sibelius' Fifth". In Krohn, Anna; Howell, Tim; Murtomäki, Veijo (eds.). Jean Sibelius's Legacy Research: on his 150th Anniversary. Cambridge Scholars Publishing. ISBN 978-15275-0-087-7.
