= Formalism (music) =

Idea that a musical composition's meaning is entirely determined by its form

In music, formalism can refer to multiple concepts in different fields, like aesthetics and historiography. It was also used as an allegation to denounce composers, most famously Dmitri Shostakovich, who did not conform to the Soviet Union's preferred musical aesthetic.

== Aesthetic theory ==
Leonard B. Meyer, in Emotion and Meaning in Music (1956), distinguished "formalists" from what he called "expressionists": "...formalists would contend that the meaning of music lies in the perception and understanding of the musical relationships set forth in the work of art and that meaning in music is primarily intellectual, while the expressionist would argue that these same relationships are in some sense capable of exciting feelings and emotions in the listener" (Meyer 1956, p. 3). (The term "expressionism" is also used to define a musical genre typified by the early works of Schoenberg. The two terms are not necessarily related.) Meyer applied the term formalist (p. 3) to Eduard Hanslick who, in his later years, championed the music of Brahms over that of Liszt and Wagner because of the clear formal principles (drawn from Beethoven's music) that he found in Brahms's music as opposed to the attempts at emotional expression and pictorial depiction (drawn from Berlioz's music) that he found in the music of Liszt and Wagner. Meyer also applied the term to Igor Stravinsky, though Stravinsky avoided applying the term to himself in the same sense. His Poétique musicale of 1942 (translated in 1947 as Poetics of Music) explores "The phenomenon of music" (title of chapter 2) from a formalist perspective. The book is the transcript of a series of lectures Stravinsky gave at Harvard University as part of the Charles Eliot Norton Lectures in 1939–40.

== Soviet Union ==
Two famous allegations of formalism were leveled at Dmitri Shostakovich. Shostakovich was denounced in the Soviet newspaper Pravda in January 1936 in connection with a Moscow performance of his opera Lady Macbeth of the Mtsensk District. The composer withdrew his Fourth Symphony before its planned first performance, and his subsequent Fifth Symphony was perceived, by at least one journalist if not by the composer himself, as "a Soviet artist's reply to just criticism". Another allegation came as part of the Zhdanov decree in February 1948, which cited Shostakovich, together with other prominent Soviet composers: Prokofiev, Khachaturian, Shebalin, Popov, Myaskovsky "and others", as being formalists.

The proscription of formalism was not restricted to the Soviet Union. For instance, in Poland immediately after World War II the Stalinist regime insisted that composers adopt socialist realism, and those who would not do so, including Witold Lutosławski and Andrzej Panufnik, had performances of their compositions banned in Poland for being "formalist". Other Eastern Bloc countries experienced similar restrictions (Zoltán Kodály complained to Panufnik of similar problems facing composers in Hungary).

== Music historiography ==
The term has also been used to designate an approach to writing about music history, sometimes called the "Great Works" approach (in analogy to "Great Books") where the music history is conceived in terms of relationships between works of art, to the exclusion of considering cultural contexts. Joseph Kerman's influential book Contemplating Music called for the re-contextualization of musical works and greater investigation into their cultural milieux rather than their subsequent status in the musical canon. This was parallel to the New Historicism in other historical fields, wherein everyday life was deemed as worthy of investigation as great men and great wars.

While not necessarily advocating a return to formalism, Lawrence Kramer has criticized the movement for reducing works of art to cultural artifacts and tending to denigrate both "meaning" in music and the "value" of exceptional works.

== See also ==
- Formalism (art)
- Formalism (literature)
- Russian formalism
- Socialist realism
