= Virko Baley =

Ukrainian composer

Virko Baley Вірко Балей
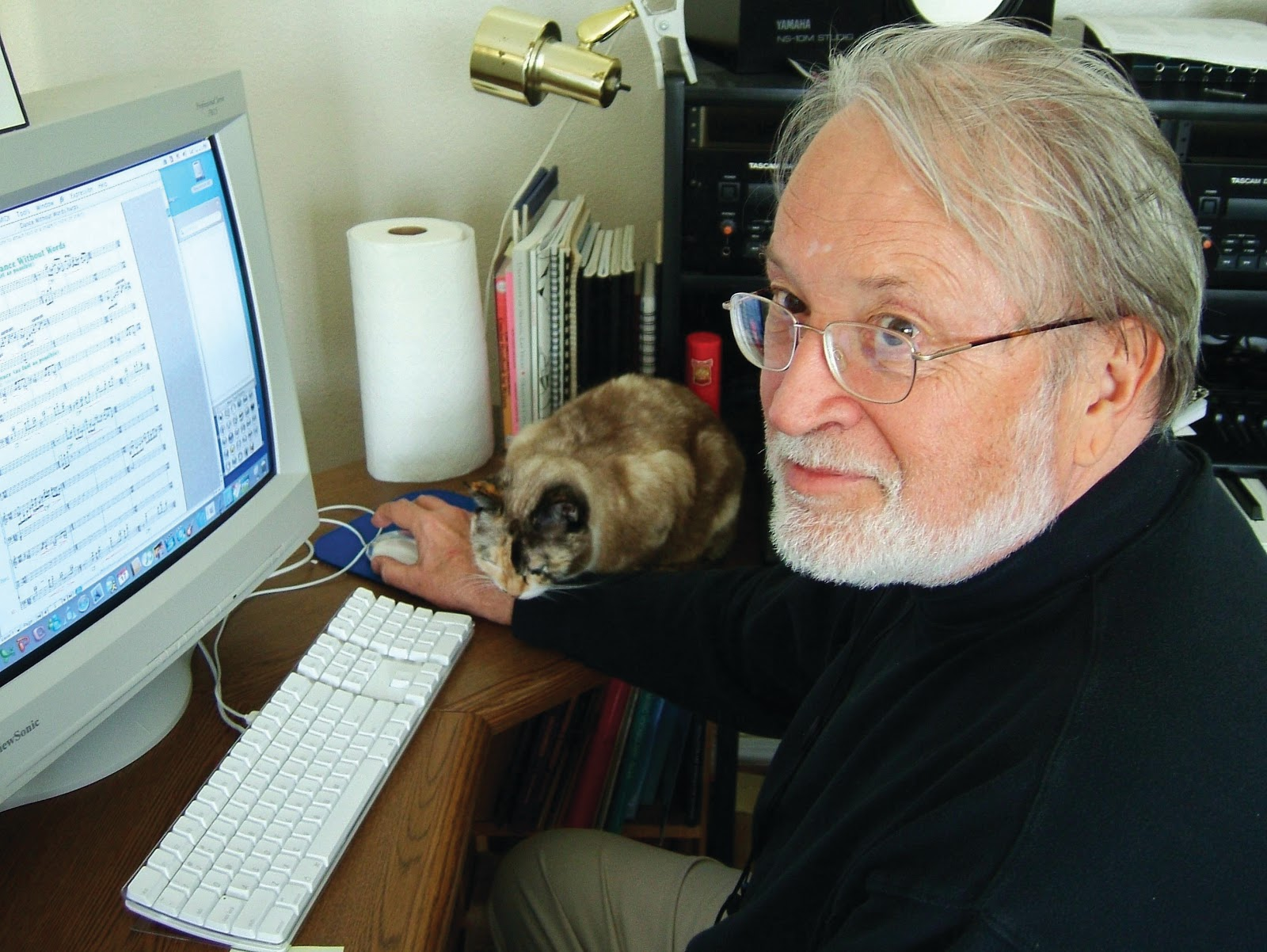
- Baley c. 2014

Background information
- Born: Viroslav Petrovych Baley; October 21, 1938 (age 87); Radziechów, Poland (present-day Radekhiv, Ukraine)
- Genres: Classical
- Occupations: Composer; Conductor; Pianist
- Instrument: Piano

Viroslav Petrovych Baley (Note: Ukrainian: Вірослав Петрович Балей, romanized: Viroslav Petrovych Balei) (born October 21, 1938, known by the diminutive Virko) (Note: Ukrainian: Вірко, romanized: Virko) is a Ukrainian-American composer, conductor, and pianist. He was born in Radekhiv in Poland (now in Ukraine), the only child of Petro (Peter) and Lydia Baley. Petro Baley was sent to Auschwitz concentration camp following the German invasion of Poland in 1939, and he and extended family were relocated to Slovakia. The family was reunited on a farm in Germany towards the end of the war to work as farm laborers, after which they relocated to Munich. From 1947 to 1949, the family lived in a displaced person's camp in Regensburg, Germany.

Baley began his formal music training in Germany. He studied at the Los Angeles Conservatory (renamed the California Institute of the Arts).

He retired from the University of Nevada, Las Vegas with the rank of Distinguished Professor of Music Composition after an academic career there lasting 46 years.

Baley is the former conductor of the Nevada Symphony Orchestra and was the guest conductor of the Kiev Camerata in Ukraine. He also co-directs Nevada Encounters of New Music, and collaborates with the New Juilliard Ensemble in New York. Baley composed the score to the 1991 Ukrainian film Swan Lake, The Zone.

In Spring 2007, Baley was commissioned by the Ukrainian Research Institute at Harvard University to write his opera Hunger.

As a producer, and through his record label TNC, Virko Baley has released a series of compact discs containing rare recordings of the pianist Sviatoslav Richter and of the Cleveland Chamber Symphony, the latter earning him a Grammy Award.

Baley has written articles on musical topics and is a contributing editor to The New Grove Dictionary of Opera and The New Grove Dictionary of Music and Musicians. From 1980 to 1995, He co-founded the Nevada Symphony Orchestra and was its music director from 1971–1985, and from 1975 to 1987 was the music director of the Las Vegas Chamber Players.

== Partial discography ==
- Jurassic Bird (Cambria CD-1077)
- Orpheus Singing (Cambria CD-1087)
- Dreamtime (Cambria CD-1090)
- Symphony No. 1: Sacred Monuments" (Cambria-1505 CD)
- Treny" for two cellos and soprano" (Cambria-1508 CD)
- X-Treme Violin" (Cambria CD-1510)
- Parables and Reflections; music for bassoon and piano" (Cambria CD)

with other composers

- 20th Century Concert Etudes (Titanic CD-Ti-199); Eugene Gratovich, violin; features the work "Figments for violin solo"
- "A Tree in Your Ear" (Cambria CD); Stephen Caplan, oboe; features the work "Orpheus Singing"
- "Artyomov/Baley/Silvestrov/Ives: Orchestra Works" (Russian Disc / Mezhdunarodnaya Kniga CD); features the work "Violin Concerto No. 1; quasi una fantasia"; Yuri Mazuekevich, violin
  - Kiev Camerata, Vol. 2" (Cambria CD); features the work "Adam's Apple"

as conductor/performer

- Cantatas: Valentin Silvestrov" (Cambria CD); with the Kiev Camerata and Lidia Stovbun
- The Body of a House: music of Walter Blanton" (Cambria CD); Kiev Camerata; New World Brass Quintet: Walter Blanton, trumpet; Timothy Bonenfant clarinet; Marcus Reddick, percussion; Miles Anderson, trombone; Erika Sharp, electric violin; Roy James, percussion; "Rite of Passage"; "Locust Dance"; "Bleecker Street Romance"; "Concertino for Trumpet and Small Orchestra"; "Wind Songs"; "Whales"; "The Body of a House"
- Dies Irae: Valentin Bibik" (Cambria CD-1405); Kiev Camerata; Grigory Vershavsky, organ; Alexander Shustin, violin; Natalia Bibik, piano; Viktoria Bibik, piano; "Symphony No. 7, op. 50"; "Sonata for violin and piano, op. 111"; "Dies Irae: Thirty-nine variations for piano, op. 97";
- Transfigured Night (Kiev Camerata, Vol. 1)" (Cambria CD); features the works "Verklärte Nacht" by Arnold Schoenberg; "Symphony No. 29 in A major, K. 201 (K. 186a)" by Wolfgang A. Mozart; "Symphony No. 10 in F sharp minor" by Gustav Mahler
- Kiev Camerata, Vol. 2" (Cambria CD); "Concerto for chamber orchestra in E flat major ('Dumbarton Oaks')" by Igor Stravinsky; "Siegfried Idyll" by Richard Wagner; "Concertino for 9 instrumentalists" by Ivan Karabyts; "Intermezzo for violin & orchestra" by Valentin Silvestrov; "Adam's Apple" by Virko Baley
- Eclipse-Music of Bernard Rands" (Cambria CD); Kiev Camerata; Thomas Paul, bass; "London Serenade"; "Madrigali (after Monteverdi/Berio)"; "Canti Dell'Eclise"
- Mozart's Last Thoughts" (Cambria CD); Kiev Camerata; David Gresham, bassett clarinet; features Mozart's works "Clarinet Concerto in A major, K. 622"; "Adagio and Fugue for string quartet (or string orchestra) in C minor, K. 546"; "Fugue for 2 pianos in C minor, K. 426": "Symphony No. 41 in C major ('Jupiter'), K. 551"
- "Artyomov/Baley/Silvestrov/Ives: Orchestra Works" (Russian Disc / Mezhdunarodnaya Knig;MK 417116 CD); Yuri Mazuekevich, violin; Mykola Suk, piano; Elissa Stutz, piano; "Concert of the Thirteen" by Vyacheslav Artyomov: "The Fourth of July" by Charles Ives: "Postludium for piano and orchestra by Valentin Silvestrov: "Violin Concerto No. 1; quasi una fantasia" by Virko Baley

== Partial list of works ==
- Partita No. 5 for flute and piano (2012)
- Hunger Opera in one act (1985; 1995–97; 2004- )
- Persona III (Luisa Triana) for flute and castanets (2008)
- Partita No. 4 for clarinets and piano (2005)
- Songs Without Words for solo instrument and piano (2004–2012)
- Emily Dickinson Songbooks (2001–2008)
- Symphony No. 2: "Red Earth" for an orchestra of soloists (2004)
- Et lux perpetua... (rest in peace) (2004)
- Dreamtime Suite No. 4 for chamber orchestra (1999–2000)
- Persona II (after Boris Lyatoshynsky) for clarinet solo (1999–2000)
- A Journey After Loves: A song-cycle for baritone and piano (1999)
- Symphony No. 1: Sacred Monuments (1985; 1997–1999)
- Klytemnestra, a dramatic scene (1997–98)
- Persona I for oboe solo (1997)
- Treny I - IV for 2 celli & soprano (1996–99; rev. 2002)
- Treny II for solo bassoon (or bass clarinet) (1997)
- Treny IA for solo contrabassoon (or B♭ contrabass clarinet) (1996)
- Orpheus Singing" for solo oboe (or clarinet) and string orchestra (or string quartet or piano) (1994)
- Nocturnal No. 6" for piano (198?)
- Nocturnal No. 5" for piano (1980)
- Sculptured Birds" for clarinets and piano (1979/1989-90)
- Nocturnal No. 4" for piano (1976?)
- Nocturnal No. 3" for three pianos (197?)
- Nocturnal No. 2" for piano (196?)
- Nocturnal No. 1" for piano (196?)
- Violin Concerto No. I "Quasi una fantasia" (1987) -Yuri Mazurkevich, violin; the USSR Ministry of Culture Symphony Orchestra, Virko Baley (conductor); recording: 1981 by Mezhdunarodnaya Kniga (MK 417116)

== See also ==
- Official website
- "UNLV composer to finally finish his opera about Ukraine famine". Las Vegas Sun. 2 November 2006. Archived from the original on 30 September 2007.
