= Opera in Ukraine =

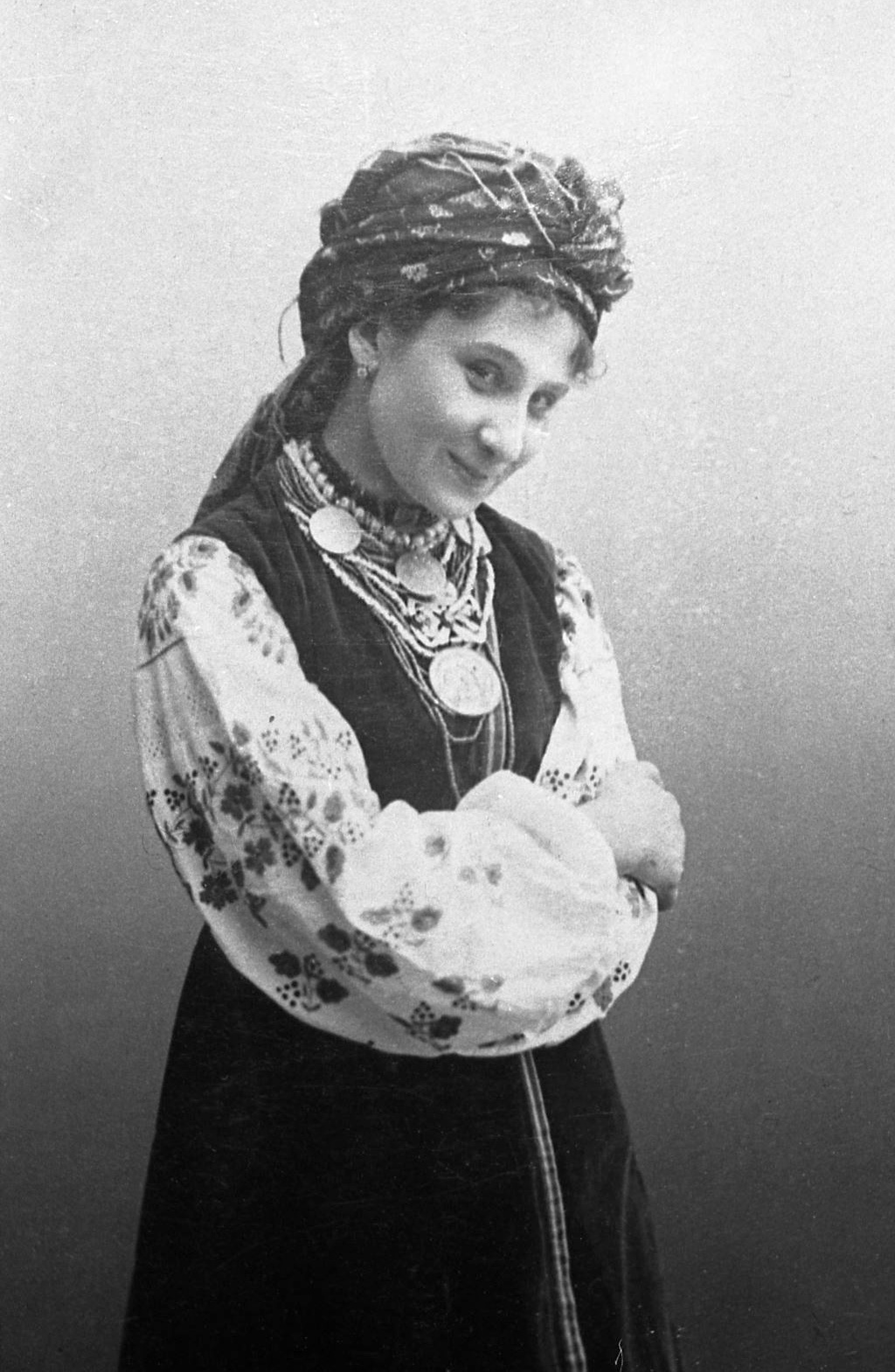
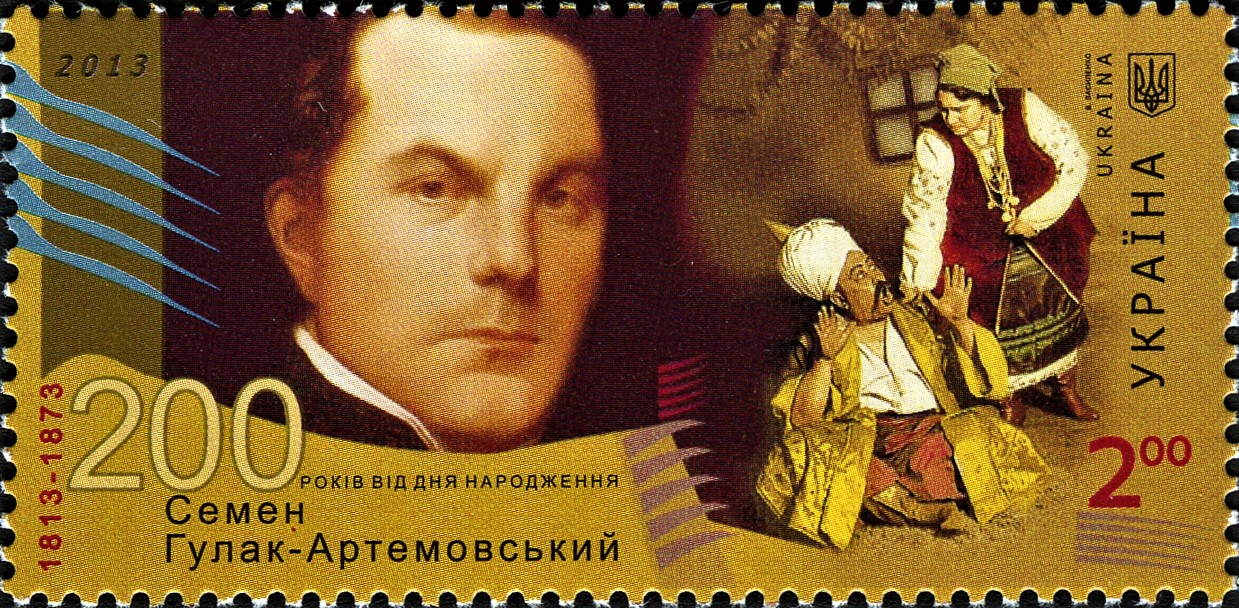
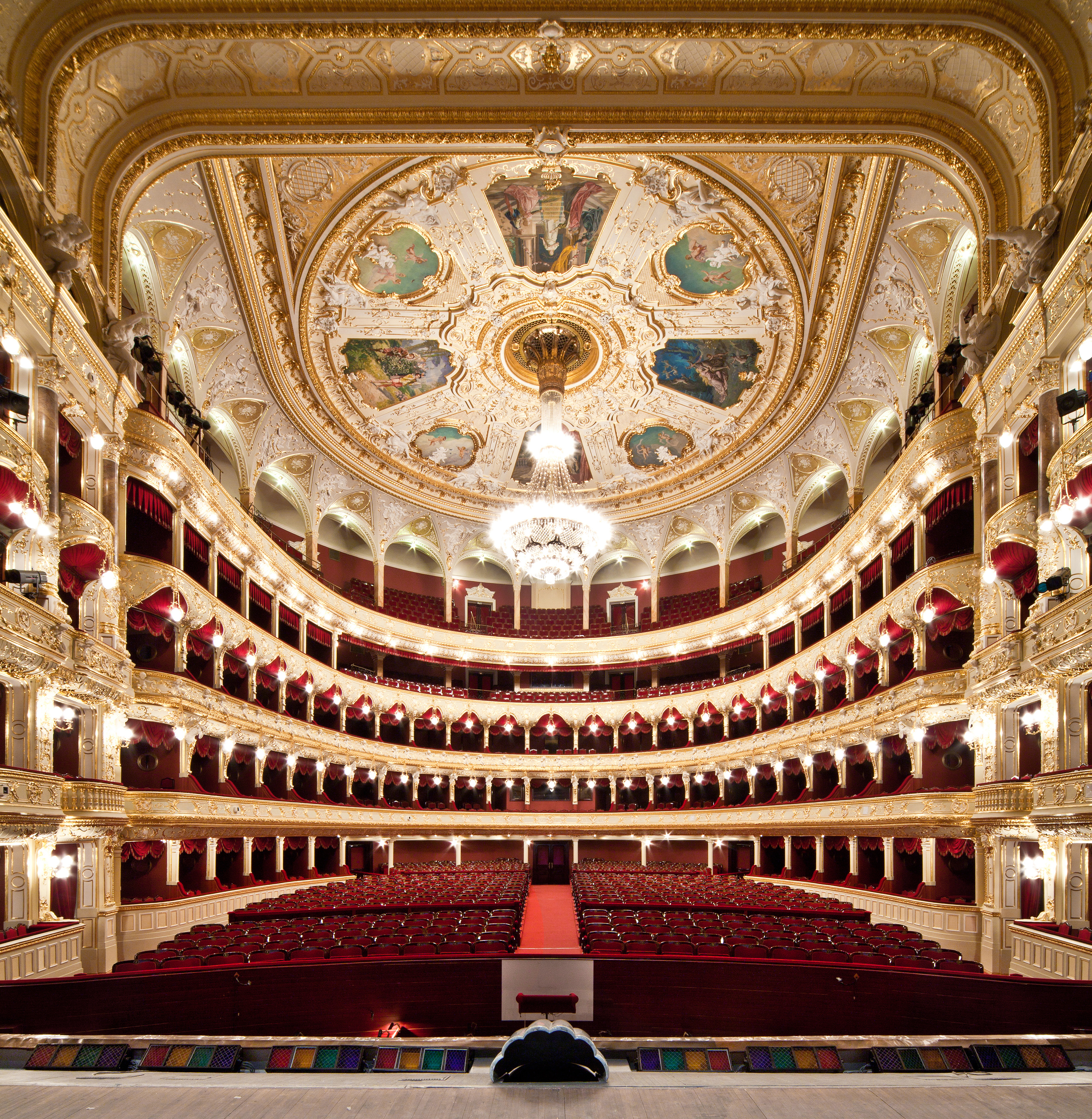
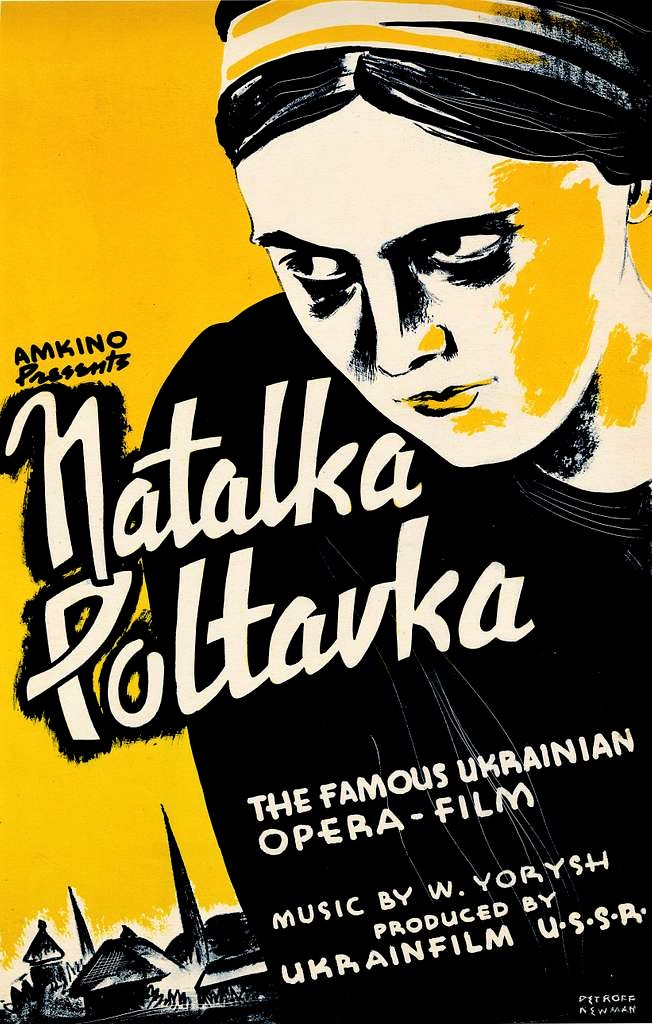
The Ukrainian actress Maria Zankovetska in Mykola Lysenko's operetta "Chornomortsi" (1892); Semen Hulak-Artemovsky and a scene from his opera A Zaporozhye Cossack on the Danube (1863) portrayed on a 2011 Ukrainian stamp; Odesa Opera and Ballet Theatre; poster for the 1936 film Natalka Poltavka, adapted from Lysenko's opera of the same name

A national school of opera in Ukraine first emerged during the last third of the 19th century, and was based on the traditions of European theatre and Ukrainian folk music. The first opera by a Ukrainian composer was Maxim Berezovsky's Demofont, based on an Italian libretto, which premiered in 1773. The oldest opera in the Ukrainian musical repertoire, A Zaporozhye Cossack on the Danube by Semen Hulak-Artemovsky, was written in 1863. The composer Mykola Lysenko, the founder of Ukrainian opera, composed a number of works, including Natalka Poltavka, Taras Bulba, Nocturne, and two operas for children, Koza-dereza and Mr Kotsky.

Ukrainian opera flourished and developed after the creation of the first professional opera houses in the 1920s, with Borys Lyatoshynsky's The Golden Ring (1929) being one of the most notable works produced there during the first half of the 20th century. From 1930 until the dissolution of the Soviet Union at the end of the 1980s, operatic performances and the creation of new works occurred under the dominance of Soviet socialist realism. During this period, Ukrainian opera was modelled on such works as The Young Guard by Yuliy Meitus, premiered in 1947. Ukrainian opera was able to develop once more during the Khrushchev Thaw from the mid-1950s to the mid-1960s. Works by Vitaly Kyreiko (Forest Song (1957)), Vitaliy Hubarenko (Love Letters (1971)), or Yevhen Stankovych's folk opera When the Fern Blooms (1979) adopted more modern themes and musical expressions that were used during the Stalinist period. Of works written during the 21st century, Moses by Myroslav Skoryk is alone in retaining its place in the local repertoire.

Ukraine has seven opera houses, which include the Taras Shevchenko National Academic Opera and Ballet Theatre of Ukraine in Kyiv, the Odesa Opera House, and the Lviv Opera House. In Ukraine, operas are staged in opera studios in the country's music conservatories and largest theatres.

== Origins ==
The first operas to be performed in what is now independent Ukraine were Italian and French operas staged during the 18th century in the estates of the wealthy nobility. The first known opera known to be written by a composer from Ukraine, Demofont by Maxim Berezovsky, an Italian-style opera with a libretto by Pietro Metastasio, was premiered in 1773 in Livorno. Between 1776 and 1787, Dmytro Bortnyansky wrote three operas in Italian and three operas in French. (Note: Creonte (1776); Alcides (1778), Quinto Fabio (1779) were all staged in Italy. Bortniansky's French operas were La fête du seigneur (1786), Le faucon (1786) and Le fils rival (1787).)

The earliest opera house in the present territory of Ukraine was the Lemberger Oper, (Note: The present opera house, which opened on 4 October 1900, is now the Solomiya Krushelnytska Lviv State Academic Theatre of Opera and Ballet.) opened in Lemberg (now Lviv) in 1772. (Note: In 1772, Lviv, then known by its German name, Lemberg, was the major city in Galicia, at that time ruled by the Habsburg monarchy. It became part of independent Poland from 1901-1939, when it was known as Lwow.) German operas were staged in Lemberg from 1774 to 1872, and Polish operas were performed there from 1780 to 1939. The Polish composer Henryk Jarecki worked there as the assistant and then the principal conductor from 1873 to 1900.

In Kharkiv, the first opera house was opened in 1780, and a similar establishment was opened in Kyiv by 1803. The Odesa Opera House, built by the Russian Opera Society, was established in 1802. Odesa became an important centre of Italian and French opera due to its international importance as a trade centre. At first, opera houses in Ukraine did not employ their own artists, but instead hosted touring artists from abroad, the majority belonging to Italian opera companies. Local composers wrote operas in Italian, which until the beginning of the 20th century was the language used for all operatic performances in this part of the Russian Empire. In 1877, a German-language professional theatre opened in Chernivtsi, at that time Czernowitz and part of the Austor-Hungarian Empire. The heyday of opera (and musical life in general) in Czernowitz is associated with the violinist and composer Vojtěch Hřímalý (1842–1908), who staged his own operas in Czech.

Until the emancipation reform of 1861, only the nobility in the Russian Empire parts of Ukraine could afford to keep orchestral players and actors, who were generally serfs. After the abolition of serfdom, the released musicians were able to work elsewhere. Alexey Verstovsky's opera Askold's Grave was staged on 27 October 1867, with musicians hired from the disbanded slave orchestra of Peter Lopukhin and others brought from Saint Petersburg. Russian opera was staged in Kharkiv from 1874 until 1886, when the Kharkiv Theatre fell into disrepair; it was rebuilt in 1890. The Czech-born Russian composer Václav Suk conducted his opera Lesův pán (The Lord's Forest) in Kharkiv in 1892. In Odesa, Russian operas were first staged in 1873. Following its destruction in a fire in 1883, the theatre there was rebuilt in 1887.

Russian composers influenced by Ukrainian culture include Nikolai Rimsky-Korsakov (in Christmas Eve and May Night), Pyotr Ilyich Tchaikovsky (with his opera Mazepa) and Alexander Borodin (Prince Igor). Within Ukraine, these operas were perceived by nationalists as possessing little of Ukrainian's culture.

=== Shkilʹna drama (school drama) ===
Ukrainian Shkilʹna drama (school dramas) first emerged at the beginning of the 17th century. They originated from the Jesuits and were influenced by the practices of the Polish Catholic Church and those institutions run by the Russian Orthodox Church, including the Kyiv-Mohyla Academy.

Students performed Christmas and Easter dramas, mystery plays, and allegorical and historical dramas. All of which had vocal, instrumental, and dance components. They were performed in a theatre built with two levels—serious acts occurred at an upper level (reached by means of a staircase)—with the characters performing in Church Slavonic, Polish, Russian or Latin. Between the serious acts, characters (who were ordinary people) performed on the lower level stage, using the local language. The music used often included Ukrainian folk tunes.

=== Vertepy (nativity scenes) ===
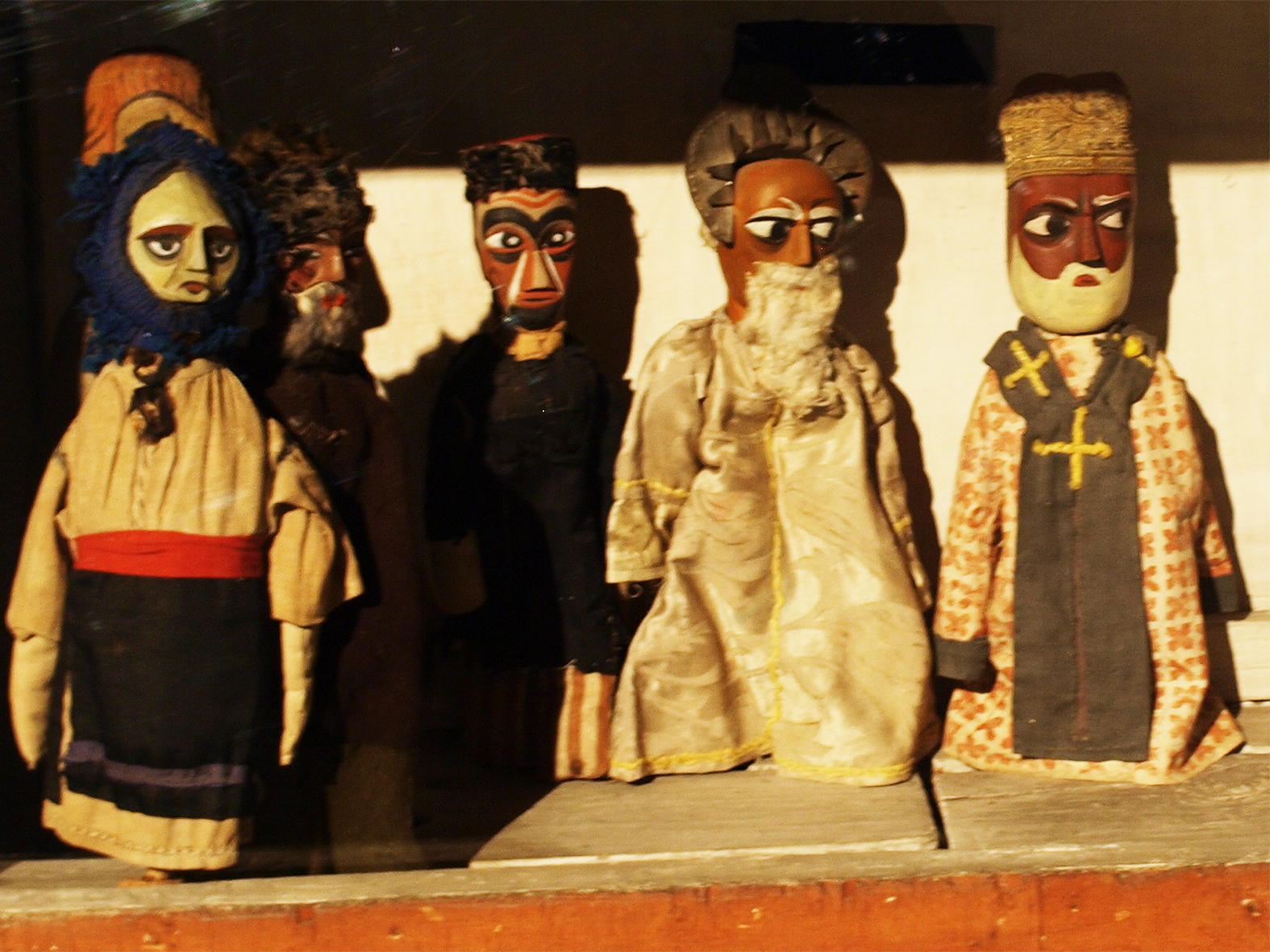
1920s nativity scene (vertep) figures (Museum of Theatre, Music and Cinematography of Ukraine)

The tradition of producing nativity scenes (vertep) in theatres was established in Ukraine during the 17th century. Similar in format to the school drama, the vertep consisted of a religious section (generally associated with Christmas) and a secular one, physically performed on two levels. The vertep developed after 1765 after school dramas were banned. Accompanied by live music, it consisted of a puppet show (or sometimes a 'living nativity scene', in which ordinary actors were used), and was typically earthy, involving humorous situations and particular characters. Vertepy often included folk songs and dances.

=== Vaudeville ===
The playwright and poet Ivan Kotlyarevsky, who played a key role in the creation of Ukrainian theatre, wrote the first Ukrainian satirical poem—Aeneid (1798)—the first major work to be written in the Ukrainian language. In 1819 Kotlyarevsky wrote two comedies for the Poltava National Theatre, Natalka Poltavka and The Moscovite Magician. The plays, both examples of vaudeville, contain songs taken by Kotlyarevsky from well-known urban and rural folk tunes. Kotlyarevsky used Ukrainian interlude, nativity, and folklore traditions. Natalka Poltavka became the most popular comedic character of its time, and was played by both amateur and professional actors; the 19th century playwright and theatre director Ivan Karpenko-Karyi referred to as her "the mother of the Ukrainian national theatre".

Kotlyarevsky's comedies were followed by similar works, such as The Courtship at Goncharivka (1835) and Shelmenko the Batman (1837), by Hryhorii Kvitka-Osnovianenko, and the Black Sea beating in the Kuban (1836) by the Cossack general Yakiv Kukharenko. During the second half of the 19th century, vaudeville, folk operetta, historical dramas, and choral works gained in popularity in Ukrainian theatres. Vaudeville flourished most notably during the 1880s, at a time when attendances in theatres in Ukraine was increasing. In Russia during the last decades of the 19th century, vaudeville became an old-fashioned form of entertainment, but in Ukraine, as in western Europe, vaudeville remained relevant and popular with audiences.

== Operetta ==
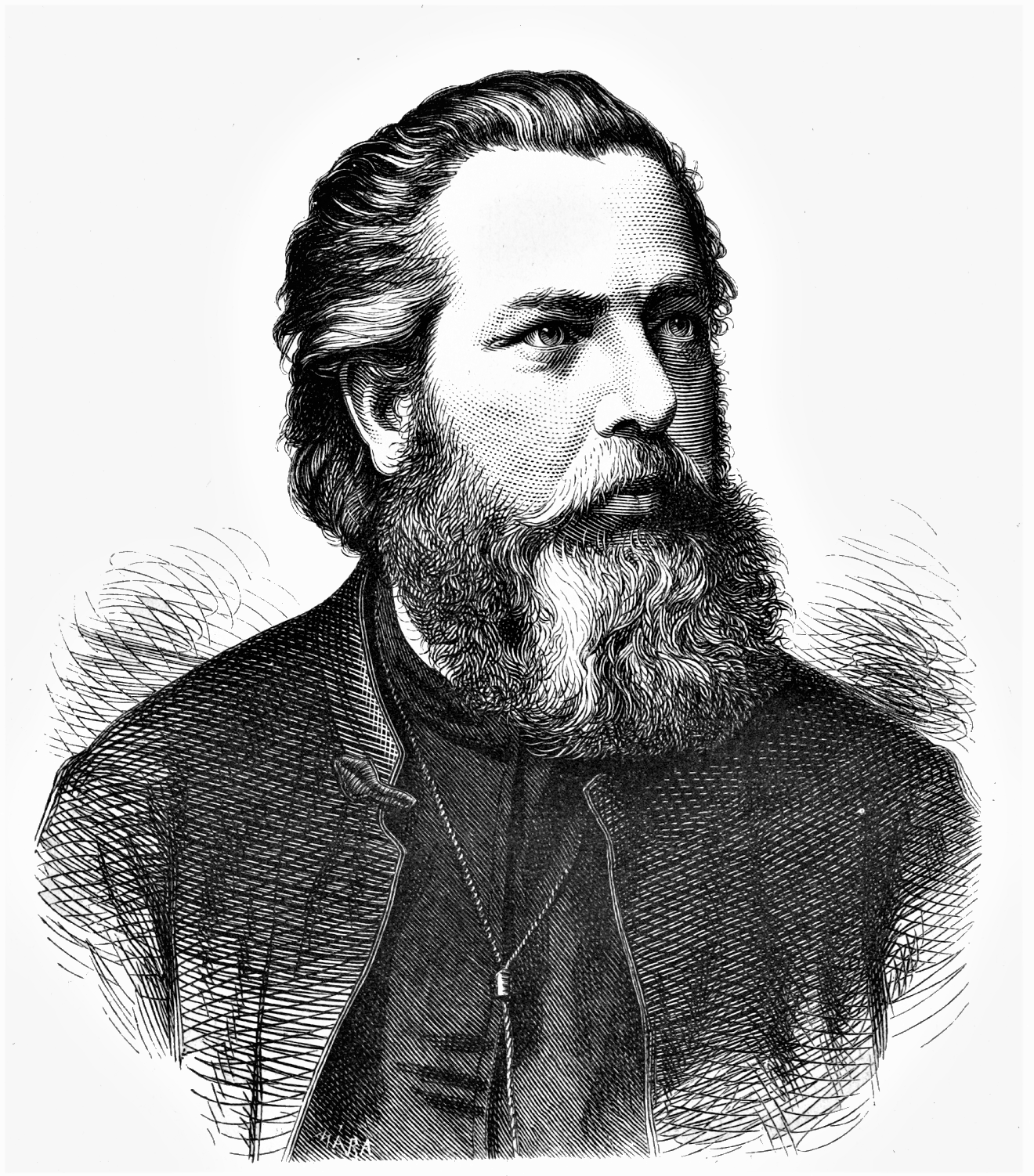
Sydir Vorobkevych

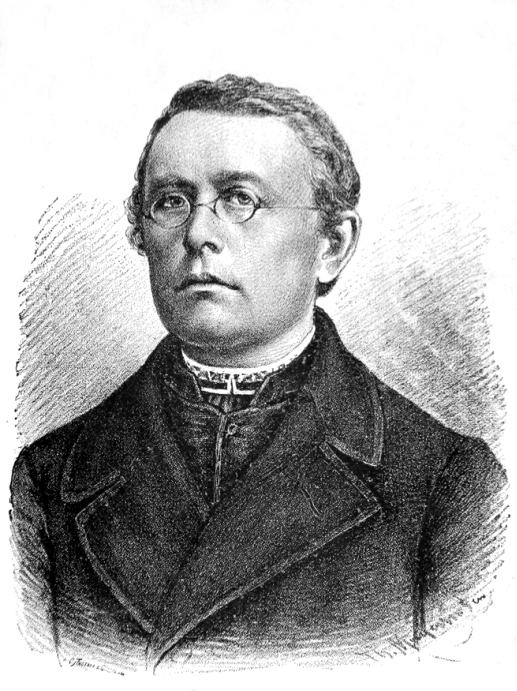
Mykhailo Verbytsky

Operetta spread quickly from the French court so that by the early 1860s it was already popular in Lemberg's theatres. When a professional Ukrainian theatre opened there, the composer Mykhailo Verbytsky began producing operettas based on Ukrainian vaudeville. His operetta Pidhiryany (1865) became popular, and other works soon appeared, including Rural Plenipotenti (1879). Another well-known composer of Ukrainian operettas was Sydir Vorobkevych, who wrote Hnat Pribluda, Bidna Marta (Poor Martha), and Zolotyi Mops (The Golden Pug).

In Ukraine, early examples of operetta include Sewn in Fools (1875) and Eyelashes (1895), comic works by Mark Kropyvnytsky, or For Neman I Go (1872) and Hryts, Do Not Leave the Party (1873) by Vladimir Alexandrov.

Modern Ukrainian composers who have since written operettas include Kyrylo Stetsenko, Oleksandr Bilash, Kostiantyn Dankevych, Dmytro Klebanov, Oleksandr Krasotov, Vsevolod Rozhdestvensky, Bohdan Kryzhanivsky, Anatoliy Kos-Anatolsky, Yakiv Tseglyar, Vitaliy Hubarenko, and Lev Kolodub.

== Obstacles to the development of Ukrainian-language opera ==
Ukrainian-language opera failed to develop during the 19th century in part due to a lack of suitable venues, and because Ukrainians formed the minority of the population in the majority of Ukraine's cities. The tsarist government's policy of curtailing Ukrainian cultural activities, especially following the unsuccessful Polish uprising of 1863, was a further obstacle to the development of Ukrainian-language opera. In 1876, the Ems Ukaz prohibited any theatrical productions in Ukrainian—a ban which lasted until 1881.

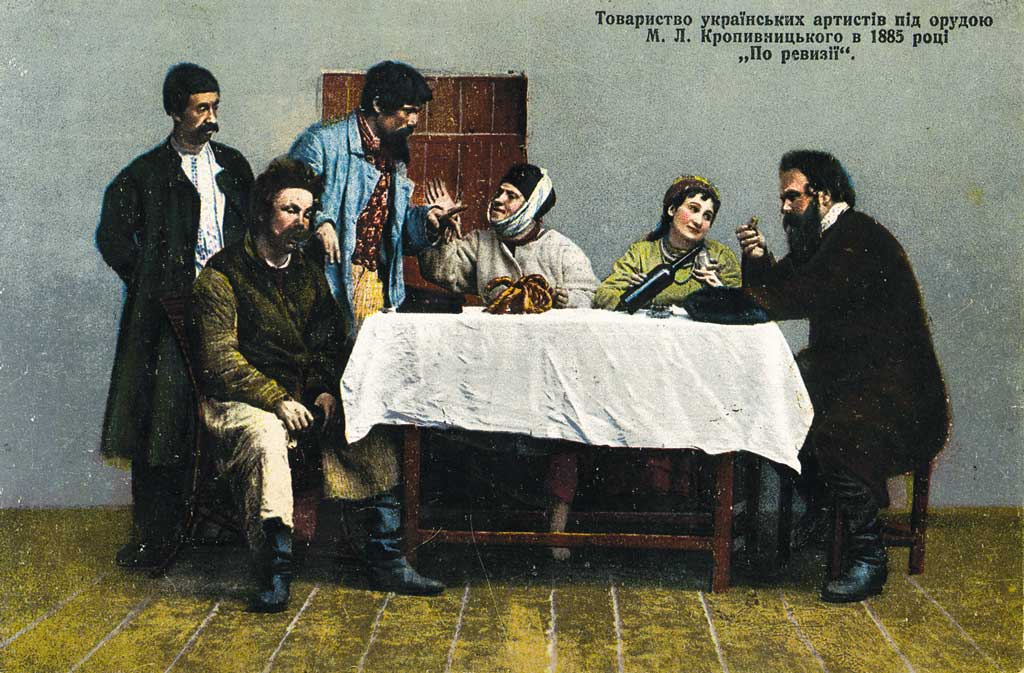
The travelling theatre of Marko Kropyvnytskyi (1885)

During much of the 19th century, the centre of Ukrainian musical and theatrical culture was in Lemberg, then under Austrian control. In 1864 the first permanent Ukrainian theatre was established there. It worked under the auspices of a Ukrainian cultural and educational society known as Rusʹka Besida (Ruthenian Conversation).

The repertoire of Ukrainian theatres was dominated by music, but lacked the resources to stage full-fledged operas. Some theatres could hire up to 50 actors, but orchestras were small in size, and talented singers soon moved on to work away from the provinces.

In 1882, Marko Kropyvnytsky's travelling theatre was established. The success of the theatre, the first where professional actors spoke in Ukrainian, contributed to the emergence of new travelling theatre companies under the direction of Mykhailo Starytsky, Panas Saksagansky, Mykola Sadovsky. and Karpenko-Kary. Sadovsky's company, established in 1907, was the first of its kind to be in Kiev, and his theatre, although it had a small troupe, did attract graduates of the music and drama school founded by the composer Mykola Lysenko.

The political situation in Russia discouraged Ukrainian composers from writing operas. The themes that it was possible to write about were limited due to tsarist censorship, which tolerated funny or sentimental folk tales, but prohibited more serious social and historical ideas from being set to music. There were few trained singers or large orchestras in Ukraine, and until 1917 only works sung in Russian could be performed in the opera houses.

== Emergence of Ukrainian opera ==
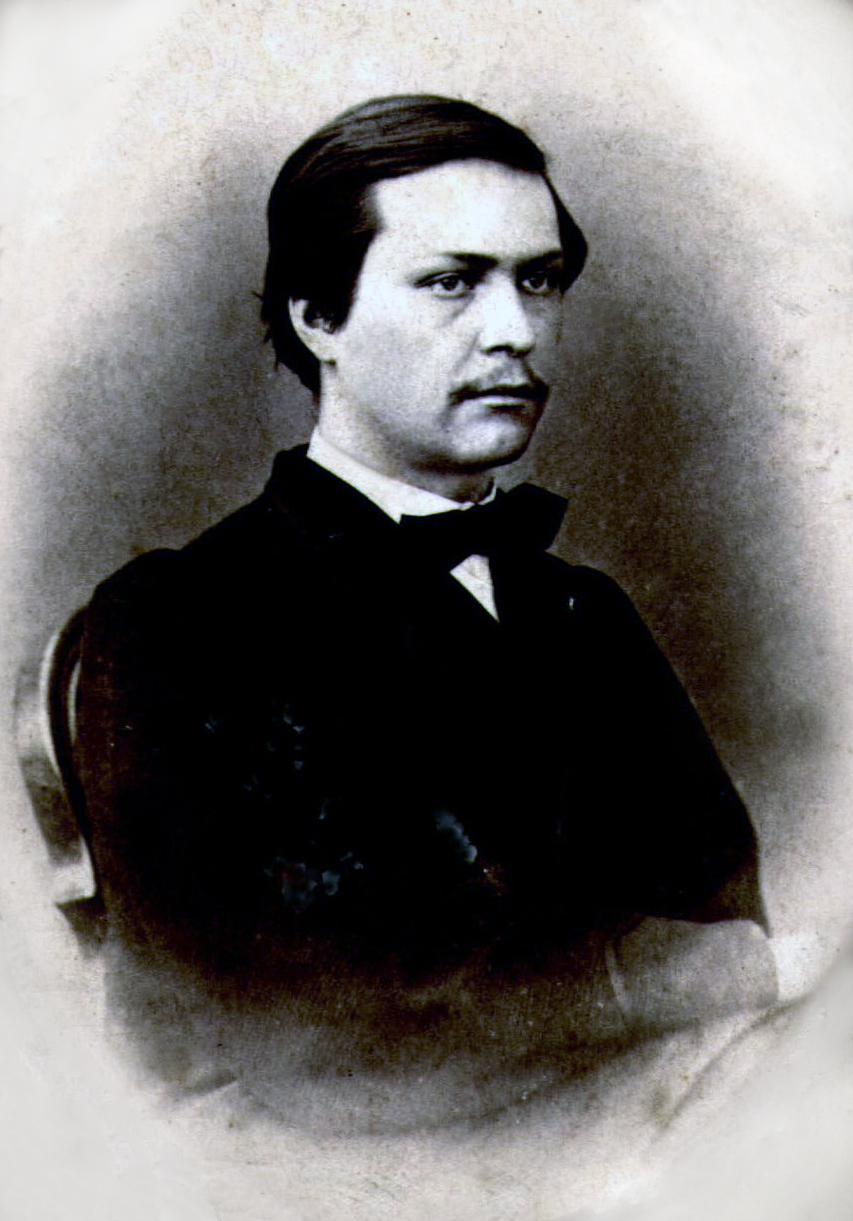
Mykola Lysenko

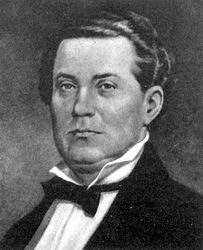
Semen Hulak-Artemovsky

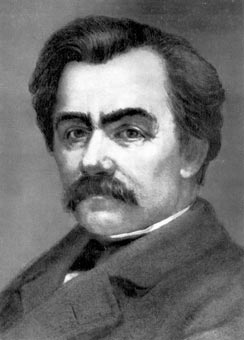
Petro Sokalsky

The first operas based on Ukrainian texts were written by the composer Petro Sokalsky. His historical opera Mazepa (1857–1859), which depicts the fate of the Cossack hetman Ivan Mazepa, was based on the poem by Alexander Pushkin. It was not performed in public. The chorus numbers were influenced by Ukrainian folk tunes, but the opera was otherwise written in a traditional Italian style. Sokalsky's May Night (1862–1876), which is based on the short story by the novelist Nikolai Gogol was also never performed in public.

Semen Hulak-Artemovsky's comic opera A Zaporozhian Cossack on the Danube became the first opera to be staged in Ukrainian. At the 1863 premiere in Saint Petersburg. the composer sang the lead role. The opera combines elements of Western opera with situations and characters based on Ukrainian folklore. Songs from the opera became popular during the 1870s and 1880s, and Zaporozhets over the Danube is still performed regularly in Ukraine.

=== Mykola Lysenko ===
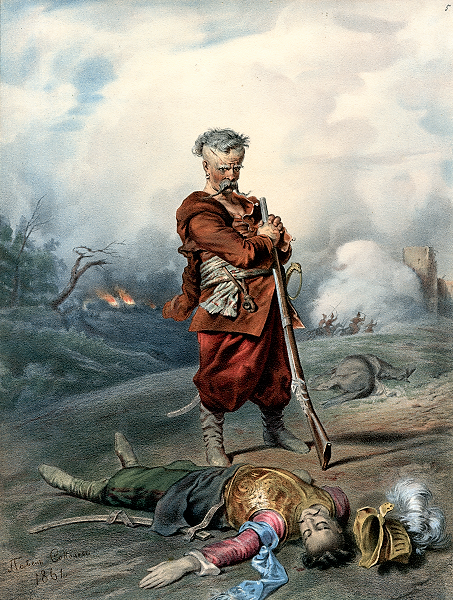
The main character from Lysenko's opera Taras Bulba. Lysenko refused to allow it to be translated into Russian, and so it was never staged during the composer's lifetime.

The approach of combining Western European and Ukrainian elements was continued by Mykola Lysenko, who is considered to be the founder of Ukrainian opera. Lysenko's adaptation of Kotlyarevsky's vaudeville Natalka Poltavka (1889) was (and remains to this day) his most popular work. His friendship with the Ukrainian playwright Mykhailo Starytsky played a key role in his development as an opera composer. Lysenko wrote his first works using texts by Starytsky: Andrashiada (1866–1877), and The Black Sea (1872). The plot of the operetta Christmas Eve (1874), which was based on a work by Gogol, was made into an opera and first performed in 1883, just after the repeal of the Ems Decree. The three operettas were close to being operas and gave impetus to the development of the opera in Ukraine. The libretto of Lysenko's next opera, Drowned, was also written by Gogol. In these early operas, Lysenko gradually created an accepted model of romantic-comic opera, that incorporated themes taken from life in rural Ukrainian. The action of his operas was simple, and his characters were distinctive. The situations depicted Ukrainian folk customs and rituals in detail using dialogue, songs and dances.

Lysenko's historical opera, Taras Bulba (1880–1891) was the first Ukrainian opera written in the tradition of grand opera. No Ukrainian theatre could stage the work in Ukrainian, but the composer refused to allow the opera to be sung in Russian, as he was aware that in this case the opera would lose its symbolic significance as a national opera, and became just another folk song curiosity. As a result, Taras Bulba was never performed during the composer's lifetime, although a piano version of the opera was published in 1884. Lysenko's three children's operas (Koza-dereza, Mr Kotsky and Winter and Spring) were composed for children's bard groups, and were based on folklore and folk tunes. They helped to establish the tradition of Ukrainian music education.

Later in his composing career, Lysenko explored new ways of using folklore in his music. His unfinished opera Sappho, which he worked on from 1896 to 1904, had a libretto written in Ancient Greek and used themes from ancient Greece. The satirical opera Aeneid (1910) is in the style of the operettas of Jacques Offenbach and contains a scathing parody of the autocracy, numerous folklore scenes—the Olympic gods and the Trojans dance the hopak (Cossack dance). Lysenko's last work was Nocturne (1912), a work that reflected the contrast between the passing of his old world and the modern one.

=== Lysenko's contemporaries and successors ===
Lysenko's contemporaries also composed operas with spoken dialogue and music that was based on folk tunes. As they moved towards writing operas with other forms and themes, the influence of Ukrainian folk music became less dominant, changing to being reflected in the music rather than included directly. Composers during the beginning of the 20th century also moved from using Ukrainian librettos to ones in Russian, in part because of the difficulties in staging operas in Ukrainian.

Most Ukrainian operas continued to use historical and rural themes, with librettos written using works by Gogol, and Taras Shevchenko, whose literary heritage is regarded as the foundation of modern Ukrainian literature. Such operas included Kupalo (1892) by the Lviv composer Anatole Vakhnianyn, a work that combines both Western European and Ukrainian folklore influences. Other works retained a more traditional style, such as Kupal's Spark (1901), the folklore opera by Boris Pidhorecký, and Poor Lisa (1919), written by Pidhorecký using a Russian libretto based on a story of the same name by Nikolay Karamzin. Both of his operas were little-known during the composer's lifetime.

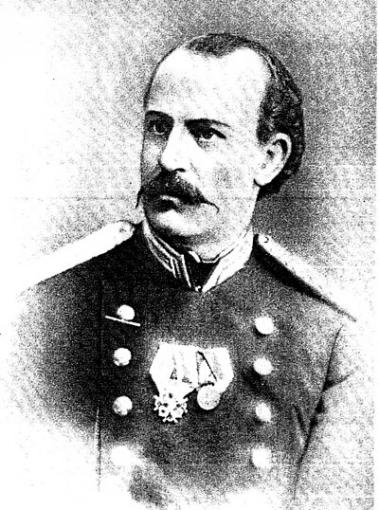
Mykola Arkas

Heorhiy Oleksiyovych Kozachenko, a Ukrainian disciple of Rimsky-Korsakov, also used Russian librettos. In 1892, he performed his opera The Silver Prince at the Mariinsky Theatre in Saint Petersburg, where he worked as a choirmaster. Kozachenko's greatest work is the comic opera The Centurion (1902), based on Shevchenko's poem. Mykola Apollonovych Tutkovsky's Russian-language opera The Strong Wind uses ideas from the Middle Ages literature of southern Europe. Pavlo Senytsia wrote Life is a Dream, based on the play by Pedro Calderón de la Barca; Senytsia's opera The Girl, based on Shevchenko's epic poem of the same name, remained unfinished. Borys Yanovsky wrote 10 operas, including Sulamif (1908), the most accessible of his works for modern listeners.

Stetsenko devoted himself fully to Ukrainian compositions. His incidental music to the play Ifgenia in Tavridia, and his two operas Polonianka and Karmaliuk were unfinished at the time of his death in 1922. The Galician composer Denys Sichynsky composed Roksoliana (1908), which was set in the Orient. With its exotic theme (the fate Hurrem Sultan, the wife of Suleiman the Magnificent) and its music, inspired by the style of the great European historical operas, it expanded the scope of Ukrainian opera and achieved considerable popularity. Of the operas composed by Lysenko's younger contemporaries, the works of Mykola Arkas stand out. His only opera Kateryna (1890, premiered in 1899), which was based on Shevchenko's poem, combines dialogue and music in a story rooted in Ukrainian rural life. Arkas made extensive use of folk music in a way that is reminiscent the works of Lysenko. In the opera, Kateryna commits suicide after being abandoned by the soldier father of her illegitimate child, and rejected by her serf village. The work has been praised for its attractive melodies and the drama of the music, but Arkas was not a trained musician, as is evident from the orchestration, which is rudimentary.

Some of Lysenko's followers devoted themselves to children's operas: Vladimir Sokalsky wrote the children's opera Beetroot (1898). and Stetsenko composed Ivasyk-Telesyk and Fox, Cat and Rooster. In 1911, Fedir Yakymenko (whose brother Yakov was also a composer) wrote a full-length fantasy based on the Hans Christian Andersen fairy tale The Snow Queen.

== Period of resurgence ==
=== 1910s ===
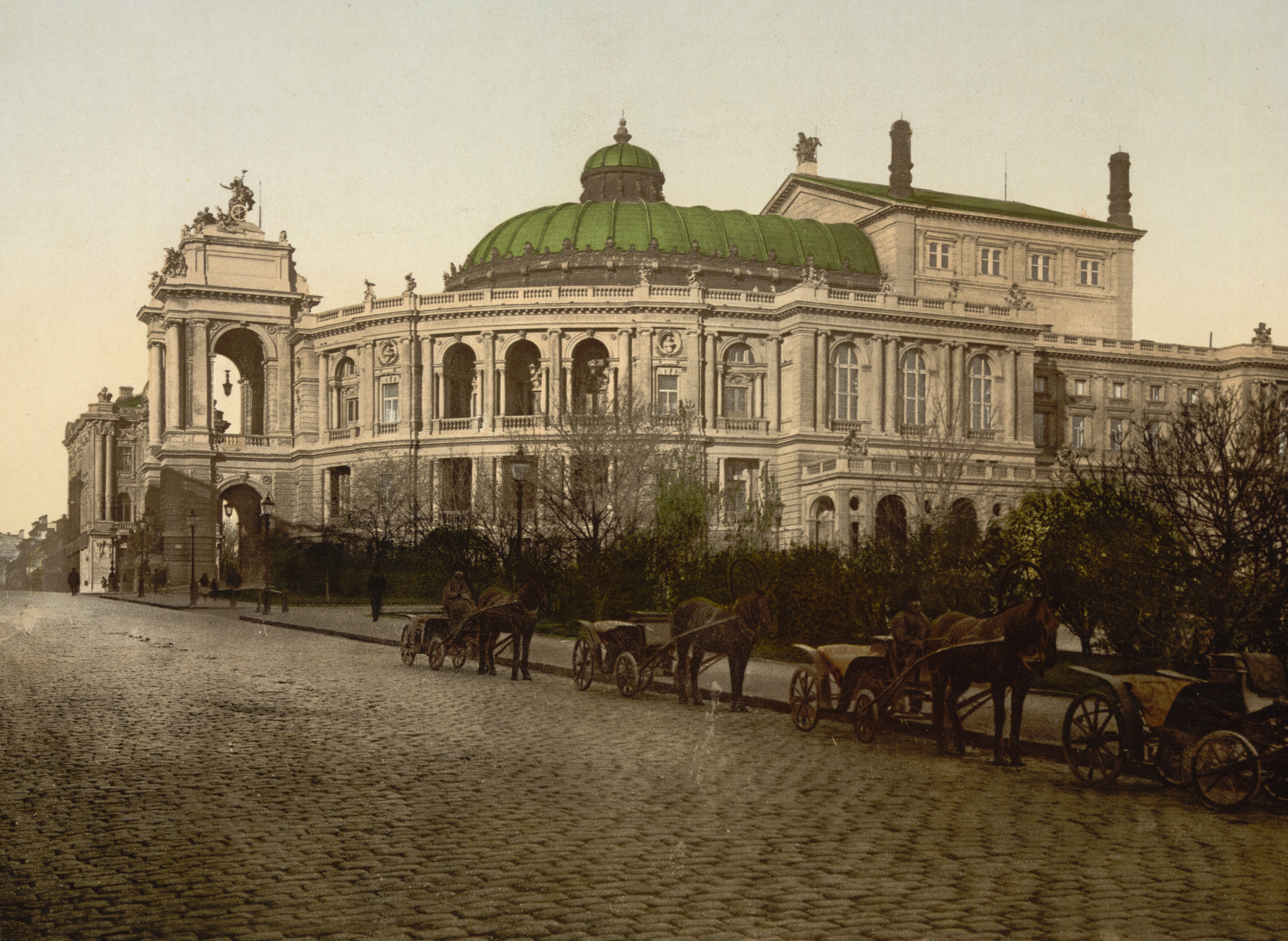
Odesa's opera house, c.1900

The First World War and the three-year Soviet–Ukrainian War that followed it severely disrupted theatrical and musical life in Ukraine, but the collapse of the Russian Empire in 1917 and the formation of the Ukrainian People's Republic created new opportunities for the development of Ukrainian opera. The new administration's Council of Ministers resolved to mobilize Ukraine's literary, scientific, artistic and technical talent. Kyiv's State Ukrainian Music and Drama Theatre was founded in 1919, led by the avant-garde director Les Kurbas.

The fate of Ukrainian opera was determined by the republic's defeat in the war against Soviet Russia. The Soviet position on opera ranged from outright condemnation towards what it considered to be a bourgeoisie genre, to a desire to bring opera closer to the proletariat. By 1919, all theatres in the Soviet-occupied territories had been nationalized; the Ukrainian Drama and Opera Theatre in Kyiv was renamed the Karl Liebknecht State Opera House. New concert venues were created sporadically in Poltava, Zhytomyr, and Zaporizhia, but organizational and financial obstacles forced them to close.

=== 1920s and early 1930s ===
In the 1920s, the state-controlled opera houses in Kyiv, Odesa, and Kharkiv were all renovated, and classical works performed in Russian. The Odesa Theatre, where V.A. Lossky was the director from 1919 to 1920, was noted for producing high quality and novel productions. In comparison, the Ukrainian Musical Theatre was forced to close, following the capture of Kyiv by the troops of Anton Denikin. Plans to create a Ukrainian opera company in Kharkiv, then the capital of the Ukrainian republic, were not realized, and attempts to stage works in Ukrainian, such as Halka, Village Honour, May Night, and Kateryna all met with little success; there was a lack of Ukrainian works that were suitable for the big stage, and few good quality translations of operas were available.

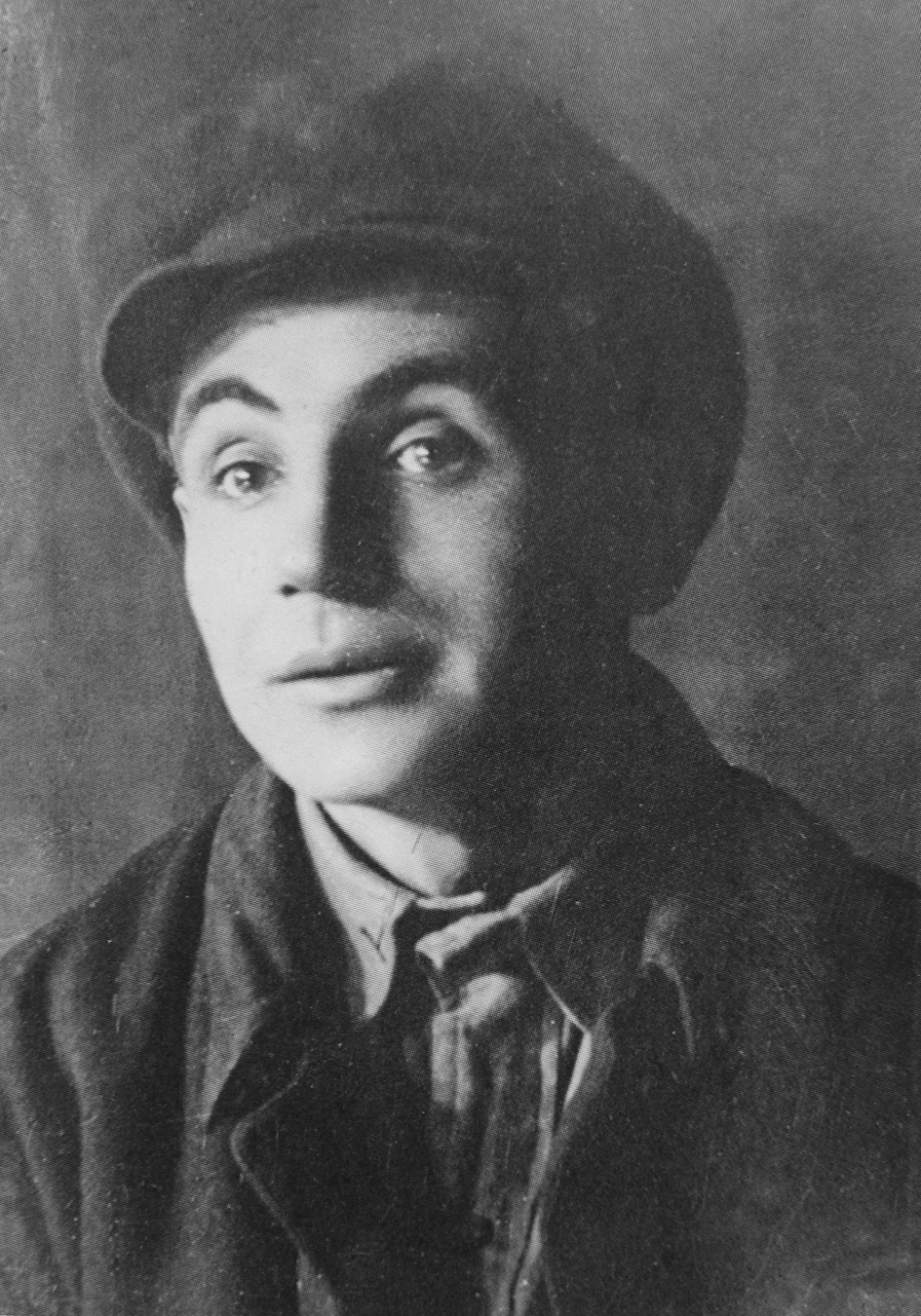
Les Kurbas, one of the directors of the State Ukrainian Music and Drama Theatre in Kyiv

In the mid-1920s, the Ukrainization of opera houses was pursued under the leadership of Mykola Skrypnyk. A notable event was the premiere in Kharkiv of Lysenko's opera Taras Bulba on 3 October 1924. Following its success, the Council of People's Commissars of the USSR decided to establish the State Ukrainian Opera Theatre in Kharkiv, which was opened on 3 October 1925 with the production of Sorochyntsi Fair by Mussorgsky. The following year, Kyiv and Odesa's opera houses were reorganized under the policy of Ukrainianization. The State Workers' Opera Theatre was established in Poltava in 1928 before moving to Dnipro in 1931. Other opera houses that emerged during this period were the State Ukrainian Right Bank Theatre based in Vinnytsia, the Nomadic Ukrainian Opera in Kherson, and the State Ukrainian Left Bank Theatre in Poltava. During the 1920s, those theatres already established by the Soviets were being supplemented by new travelling theatres, who performed opera in the smaller towns.

Ukrainian opera became typically experimental and avant-garde, a trait that was characteristic of early Soviet theatrical productions, which were characterized by a movement towards expressionism or constructivism. The authorities championed directors such as Les Kurbas, Viktor Kosenko, and Borys Yanovskyi, who opposed the sentimental use of folklore and the superficial realism of pre-revolutionary directing and production. Avant-garde operas staged at this time included Vladimir Deshevov's Ice and Steel (1930), Lev Knipper's Northern Wind (1930), Ernst Křenek's Jonny spielt auf, and Max Brand's Maschinist Hopkins.

The main obstacle to the development of Ukrainian opera was the poverty of the repertoire. A limited number of older operas existed, such as Lysenko's Taras Bulba or Anatole Vakhnianyn's Kupalo, which seemed obsolete (Yanovskyi called Lysenko's opera "old-fashioned, faded music"). During the first years of the Soviet government, almost no new operas were composed; the Soviet leadership demanded that art followed the doctrines of Bolshevism and underwent proletarianization. Artists were seen primarily as ideological workers. The Communist Party demanded that all works of art had to depict the class struggle and exalt the common people at the expense of the individual—expressions of personality and philosophical questioning had to submit to a single correct worldview. The discussions on cultural policy that took place in the 1920s that had led to experimentation and the emergence of innovation in opera, had from the early 1930s given way to stereotypical libretti and music. Composers were expected to produce works that corresponded to Soviet ideology, with themes that drew from the present or from historical episodes of national importance.

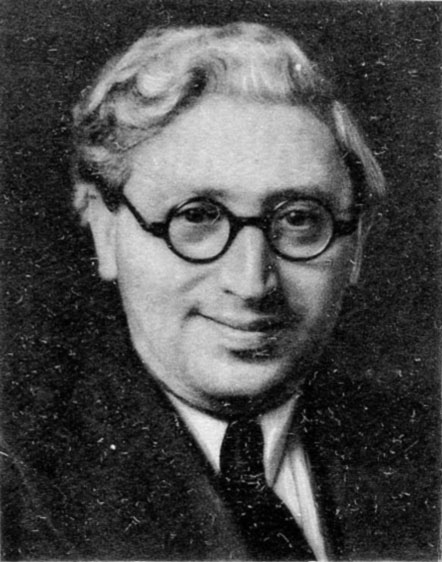
Vladimir Yorish

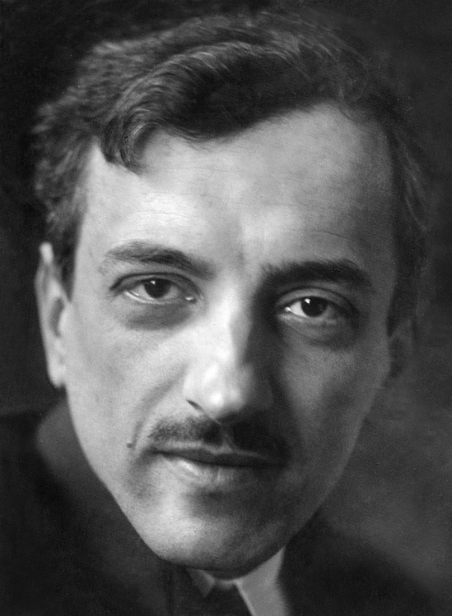
Borys Lyatoshynsky

The first operas about construction, written during a period when Soviet music was intoxicated with the theme of machines, were Weeds and The Poem about Steel (1932), written by the Ukrainian composer and conductor Volodymyr Yorysh. Operas of this type generally had a fast-paced plot that was inspired by a cinematic-like narration, with film sometimes integrated into the work. The choir (representing the collective) had a prominent role, with the main roles being less predominant. Other compositions of this type include those by Volodymyr Femelidi, whose opera The Cleft (1929) on the theme of the Kronstadt rebellion, is a musical drama based on dialogues that effectively captured the tone of contemporary revolutionary public speaking. Femelidi died before the completion of his second opera. Caesar and Cleopatra.

==== Historical opera ====
Many operas of this period were based on historical themes; Kosenko's Karmelyuk (1930) and Yorish's opera of the same name was about the leader of a peasant uprising in Podolia in the 19th century. Vasily Zolotarev, with his one-act work Hvesko Andiber (1927), became the first operatic composer to feature the duma (a sung epic poem) and write about the life of the Cossacks. Yanovskyi involved similar topics on a larger scale in his opera The Black Sea Duma (1928), set during the Turkish occupation of the land of Cossacks.

The most notable example of Ukrainian historical opera during the first half of the 20th century is The Golden Ring by Lyatoshynsky, a work that was based on the novel by Ivan Franko (1930). Both the music and the libretto blend historical, mythological, and social themes, and Lyatoshynsky's score organically combines leitmotifs with Ukrainian folk tunes. The Golden Ring was the first example of an orchestrally 'symphonic' work in the history of Ukrainian opera. It appeared at the end of the era of creative experimentalism, which ended with the arrival of Stalinism.

== Stalinism (1932–1956) ==
The 1930s were a dark period for Ukrainian history. Violent collectivization resulted in famine, the policy of Ukrainianization was halted, or even partially reversed, and the period of Stalin's totalitarian regime peaked, marked by rigid centralization and ideological surveillance. Extensive repression began in the second half of the 1930s, which, among other things, affected Ukrainian cultural life, including music. In 1932, the free Association of Proletarian Musicians of Ukraine and other music associations were dissolved and a well-organized Union of Composers of the USSR was established. The travelling theatres were given permanent locations in 1932 (DROT in Dnipropetrovsk, the Right Bank Opera in Vinnytsia and the Left Bank Opera in Luhansk), which made the supervision of their activities easier for the authorities. The artistic experiments of the 1920s gave way to the unified, dictated aesthetics of socialist realism. This style was generally defined in terms of realism, popularity, intelligibility, and truthfulness, and was opposed to undesirable elements, all of which were vaguely defined, such as formalism, cosmopolitanism, and bourgeois decadence.

The Stalinist politics of the 1930s led to a de facto return to the social values and cultural hierarchies of the pre-revolutionary period, albeit in a distorted form, and to the cultural policies of the 19th century. Opera—especially great historical opera—officially received state support, but strict criteria about what was allowed were set. The tone was set by an official criticism of Dmitri Shostakovich's Lady Macbeth of Mtsensk in Pravda in 1936, under the title "Muddle instead of Music". The model for Soviet composers became operas such as Quiet Flows the Don by Ivan Dzerzhinsky or In the Storm by Tikhon Khrennikov. Composers and performers who deviated from official policy were targeted by the state. The creation of modern-sounding musical adaptations or contemporary themes (with the exception of those about the October Revolution and the Civil War) led to operas being accused of formalism—and historical themes or works based on national musical traditions caused Ukrainian composers to be accused of being nationalistic. The few new operas that appeared avoided experimentation; they were characterized by ostentatious spectacle and oversized orchestras and choruses.

Operas by Ukrainian composers during the 1930s include Night of Tragedy (1935) by Dankevych, and Marina (1939) by Herman Zhukovskyi, Mykhailo Verykivskyi's Heaven Works (1934) and The Sotnyk (1938), and an opera by Yorysh about Shevchenko in 1940, The state encouraged the cult of Mykola Shchors, a Ukrainian red army leader during the civil war; operas about him were composed by Yorysh (1936) and Sergei Zhdanov (1938). The authorities rejected these and selected a third opera about Shchors by Lyatoshynsky, who attempted to combine a symphonically based musical drama with songs, centred around the image of an idealized hero, to inspire revolutionary emotions. Lyatoshynsky's opera has been described by scholars as a "stylistic catastrophe", but some Ukrainian musicologists consider it to be highly original.

Obstacles prevented pre-revolutionary Ukrainian operas from being staged, apart from ideological objections towards the librettos. The difficulty of producing works written for small semi-professional theatres in large opera houses caused opera scores to be reworked. Composers proved their loyalty to the state by undertaking to amend scores, so avoiding the need to compose operas that favoured the authorities. A Zaporozhian Cossak on the Danube and Natalka Poltavka were adapted by V. Joryš, and Lysenko 's Utonula was amended by P. Tolsťakov, but the amended editions proved to be unpopular and were rejected. The reworking of Lysenko's opera Taras Bulba into a national-historical opera was of greater importance. The text was edited by the contemporary Ukrainian poet Maksym Rylskyi, the music was edited and supplemented by Levko Revuckyj—his only contribution to the genre of opera—and the opera was re-orchestrated by Lyatoshynsky, as Lysenko's orchestration was considered lost at the time. This 1937 edition of the work, with its tragic end to the story, was criticized by Stalin, and had to be replaced by a new, more militant one; the final edition of Taras Bulba did not appear until the 1950s.

=== World War II ===
In 1941, as a response to the German invasion of the USSR, prominent musicians, actors, and theatrical companies were evacuated east, away from the conflict zones. They continued to stage productions, albeit simpler in scope, such as Verykivskyi's The Little Girl in Irkutsk (1943), a non-political, lyrical and folklore-packed opera which was popular with audiences during the war.

During the German and Romanian occupation of Ukraine (which included adjacent areas of modern-day Belarus and pre-war Second Polish Republic), the authorities kept the city opera houses open.

Composers evacuated to other parts of the USSR sometimes assisted in developing the culture of opera in the places where they were sent; Reinhold Glière and Yuliy Meitus contributed to the formation of the Uzbek and Turkmen opera respectively, Pylyp Kozytskiy's Bashkir opera For the Fatherland (1941) was one of the earliest operas to respond to the events of the war. Hliba Pavlovych Taranov wrote The Battle on the Ice (1942), a heroic historical opera about the 1242 Battle of Lake Peipus, the plot however is overshadowed by oratorio-style songs about the effects of German invasion of the Soviet Union.

=== 1945–1953 ===
After the war, heroism in battle, patriotism and the fraternity of the peoples of the Soviet Union continued as the predominant operatic themes, with operas by Russian composers such as Marian Koval and Vladimir Enke, which premiered in Odesa and Lviv. Works by Zhukovskyi, Klebanov, and others emerged immediately after the war, the only example of any quality being Meitus's The Young Guard (1947).

Following the end of the war, a second wave of cultural repression occurred in Ukraine, led by the Soviet ideologist Andrei Zhdanov. The Ukrainian Communist Party attacked Mejtus's The Young Guard and other operas, but the main target of official criticism was the historical opera Bohdan Khmelnytsky (1951), written by Dankevych for the 300th anniversary of the "re-union" of Ukraine with Russia. After its premiere in Moscow, the work was criticized for promoting nationalism, and it had to be revised. (Note: Dankevych returned to the opera at the end of his life in 1977 and removed some of the forced interventions.) Bohdan Khmelnytsky is nowadays considered by Ukrainian musicologists to be the most representative work of the Ukrainian national-historical opera. Zhukovsky's opera From the Whole Heart (1950) was condemned in Pravda for having aesthetic shortcomings, and an insufficiently heroic depiction of life in the kolkhoz (collective farm); the composer was stripped of his Stalin Prize.

Other works of this period include Dovbush (1955), the only opera by the Galician composer Stanyslav Lyudkevych, Verykivsky's Refugees (1948), and Oskar Sandler's comedy opera In the Steppes of Ukraine (1954).

== 1953–1991 ==
=== 1953–1970 ===
After Stalin's death in 1953 there was a gradual rehabilitation of artists: in opera this was symbolized by the Moscow government's decision in 1958 to officially "correct mistakes in its evaluation of opera". During the Khrushchev Thaw (from the mid-1950s to the mid-1960s), more operas were created than in the previous 30 years, and there was a return to the experimentation of the 1920s. During the latter part of the 1960s, operas returned to being conservative and prescriptive, and many younger composers avoided composing them.

A peer of Zhukovsky's, and one of the main representatives of the official opera of the 1950s, was Heorhiy Maiboroda. His opera Mylana (1957) uses Carpathian folklore on the theme of the resistance movement in Transcarpathian Ukraine during World War II and, in contrast to works from Stalinism, better depicts individual characters and highlights the emotion of the story. Vitaly Kyreiko's first opera Forest Song, based on the fantastic-symbolist play by Lesya Ukrainka, also premiered that year.

Other operas written during the 1950s include Kos-Anatolsky's only opera Zagrava (1957), which is reminiscent of work produced during the Stalinist period, albeit at a high technical level, and Dankevych's opera Nazar Stodolya (1959), based on a play of the same name by Shevchenko. The composer Marko Karminsky made his debut with the opera The Bukovinans (1957). The opera used Carpathian folk music and does not deviate from the socialist realism style.

Hubarenko attracted attention with his first opera Destruction of the Squadron (1967), a symphonic work based on the play by Oleksandr Korniychuk about the sinking of the Black Sea Fleet in 1918. In composing the opera, Hubarenko followed the principles of the German composer Richard Wagner. It was created to celebrate the 50th anniversary of the October Revolution and the critics, awaiting the usual pompous pathos associated with the revolutionary themes of Soviet operas, were taken aback by the "raw, focused, ascetic" music. Taras Shevchenko (1964) is considered by critics to be Maiboroda's best opera, which in four scenes are used to present episodes from the poet 's life. Other notable works composed during the 1960s include Kyreiko's folklore opera On Sunday Morning She Gathered Herbs (1966), and Zhukovsky's opera Arsenal (1960) about the Civil War of 1919, Other operas by Zhukovsky include a reworking of his lyrical-psychological opera From the Whole Heart under the new title The First Spring (1959), the opera triptych Contrasts of the Century (1960–1967), the operas Out of Law (1968), One Step to Love (1970), and his opera for a single singer The Volga Ballad (1967).

It was not until he reached old age that the composer Dmitri Klebanov began to write operas. His works Communist (1967) is thematically conservative, as are his later works Red Cossacks (1972) and May Day (1981).

=== 1970s ===
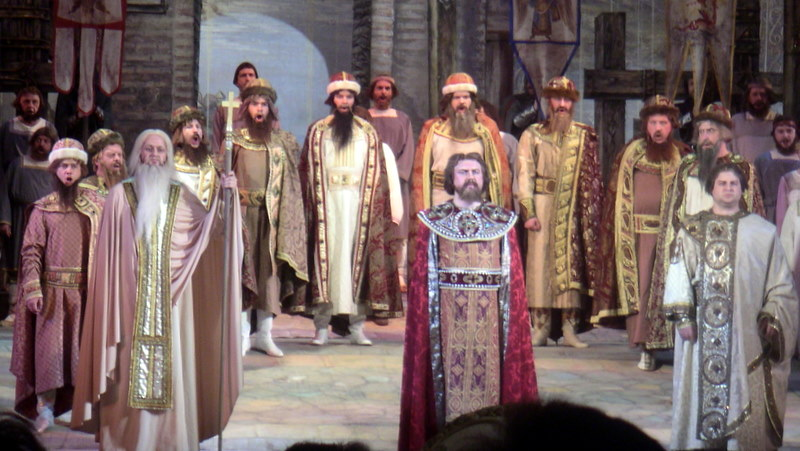
Serhiy Magera as Yaroslav the Wise, in a 2009 production Heorhiy Maiboroda's 1975 opera

Works composed during the 1970s include Lieutenant Schmidt (1970), a typically Soviet-style heroic-romantic opera, composed by Borys Yarovynskyi about the naval uprising in Sevastopol during the 1905 Russian Revolution, and Krasotov 's lyrical-psychological opera The Song of the Taiga (1977). Maiboroda's most ambitious work is his opera Yaroslav Mudryi (Yaroslav the Wise) (1973), which, although presenting an idealized version of the main hero, Yaroslav, a prince of Kievan Rus', has remained in the Ukrainian repertoire. The same is true of Hubarenko's Through the Flame (1976), about the Russian revolutionary Comrade Artyom.

In the 1970s some composers combined authentic Ukrainian folk music with modern compositional techniques. An example is Leontovych's On the Water Nymph's Easter, which was left unfinished at the time of his murder in 1920, but which was completed by Myroslav Skoryk, and premiered in Kiev in 1977. The cornerstone of Ihor Shamo's opera Yatran Games (1978) is a cappella singing.

Yevhen Stankovych's folk opera When the Fern Blooms was to be shown at an exhibition in Paris, but was banned just before its premiere in 1979. Since its first performance 40 years later, the work, in which the composer combines contemporary classical music with folklore, and a symphony orchestra with a folk choir and Ukrainian folk instruments, has been recognised as an outstanding example of neofolk in opera.

=== 1980s ===
Since the 1970s, new operas have rarely been performed in Ukraine. A new policy introduced by the authorities to encourage "exchange" performance of operas by other communist republics in the Soviet Union and its eastern European neighbours, but low audience numbers caused it to fail. The operas performed became limited to a narrow circle of classical works, in particular those from the 19th century. The only opera by Ivan Karabyts is his Kyiv Frescoes (1983) in collaboration with the poet Borys Oliynyk, which the composer described as an opera-oratorio; the work uses sources ranging from Old Slavic texts to documents from the Russian Revolution.

In 1985, Hubarenko's comic opera The Reluctant Matchmaker was premiered. However, his main contribution to opera and his masterpiece, Love Letters (1971), based on a short story by the French novelist Henri Barbusse. Hubarenko also wrote Remember Me (1974/1980, originally called Reborn May) and the opera-ballet Vij (1980).

Karminsky's most popular work is the musical Robin Hood (1983); his last opera was Just One Day (1987), a sequel to Ten Days. Other works produced during the 1980s include Kyrejka's comic opera Vernissage at the Fair (1985), based on the comedy by Kvitka-Osnovianenko, and Vadym Hryhorovych Ilyin's comic opera Thunder from Putivl (1981). Igor Kovach devoted himself to fantastic and fairy-tale plots; he wrote the opera-ballet The Who Runs on the Waves (1987) and the opera The Blue Islands (1988).

== Post-independence operas ==
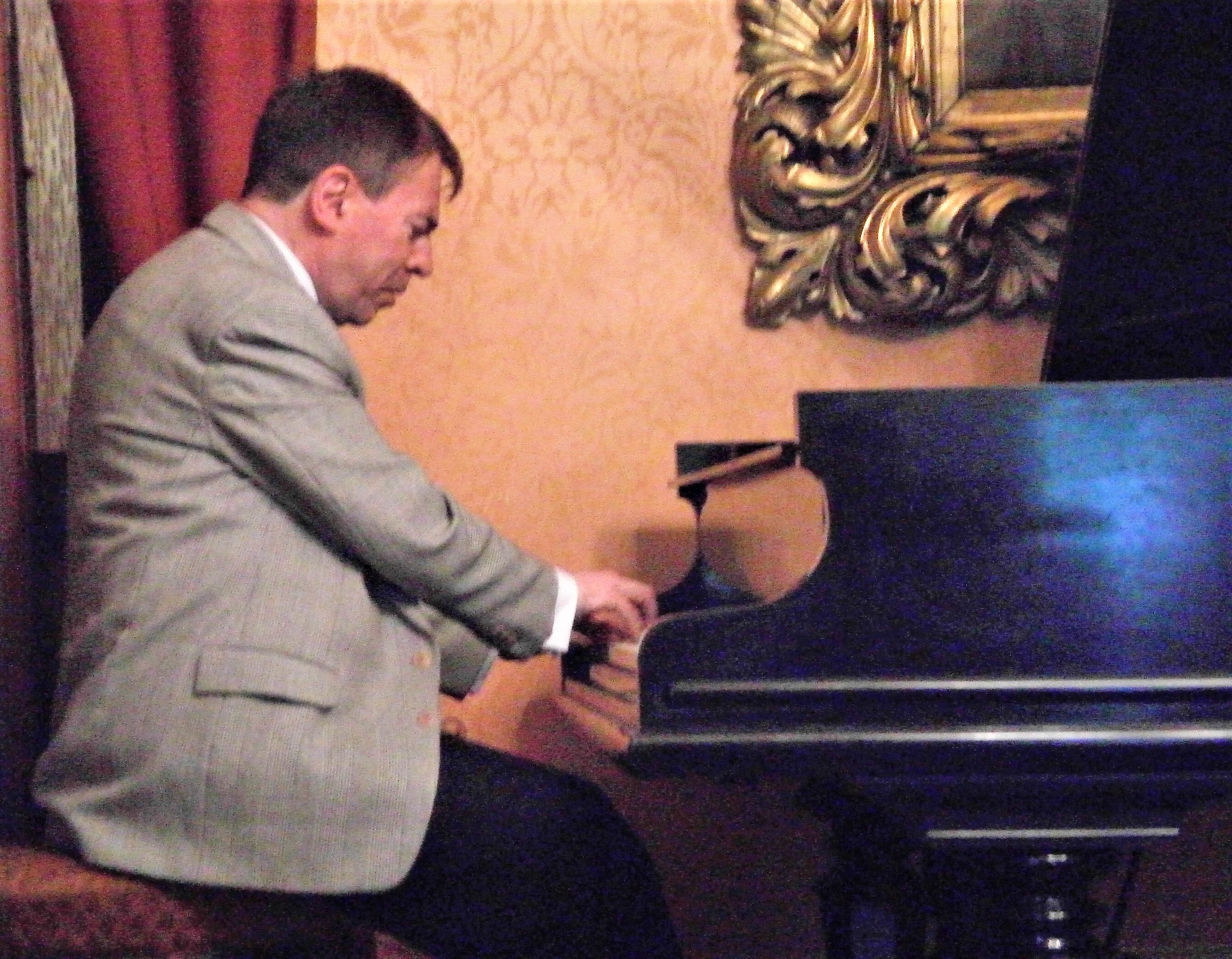
Oleksandr Kozarenko

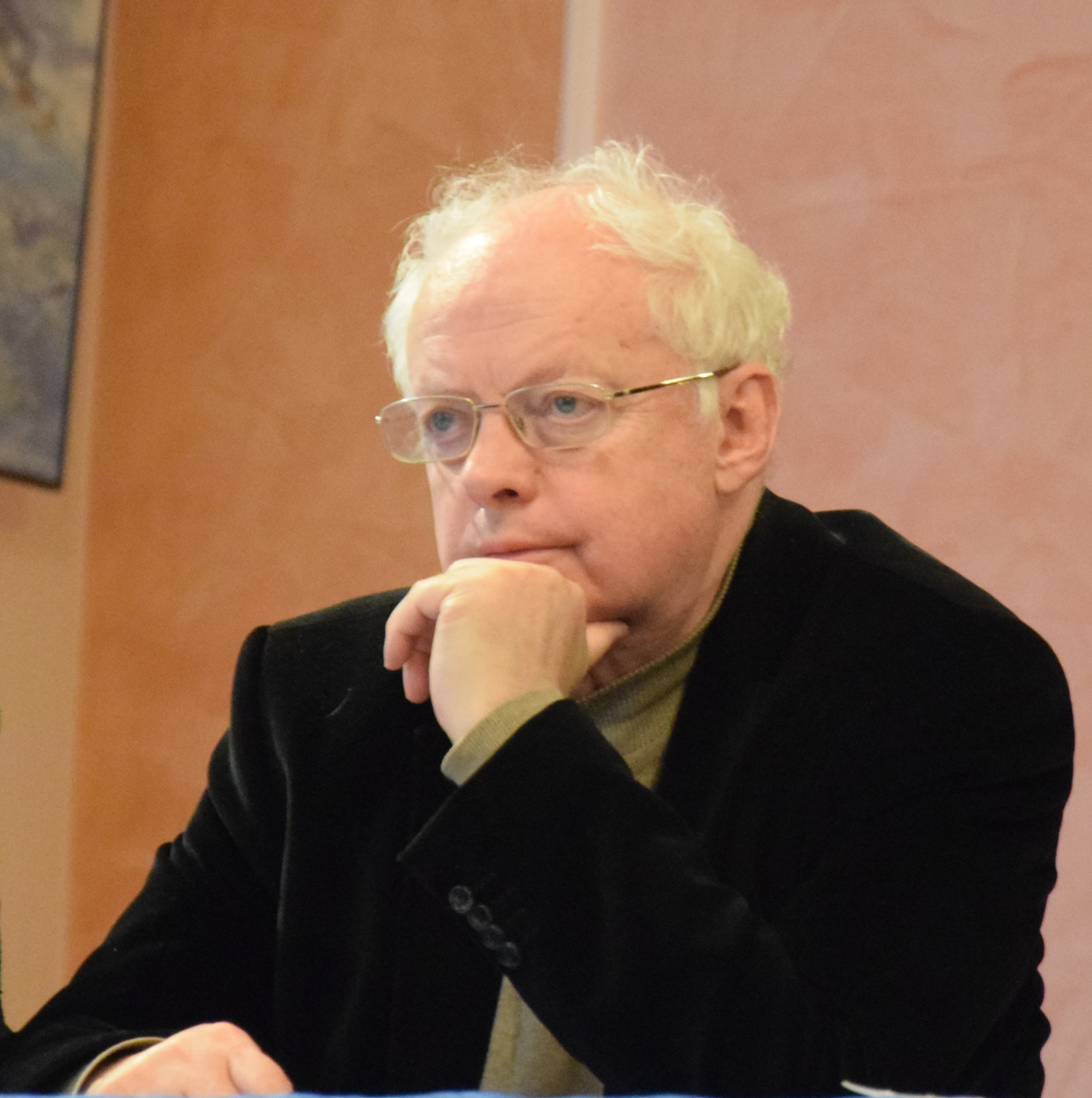
Myroslav Skoryk

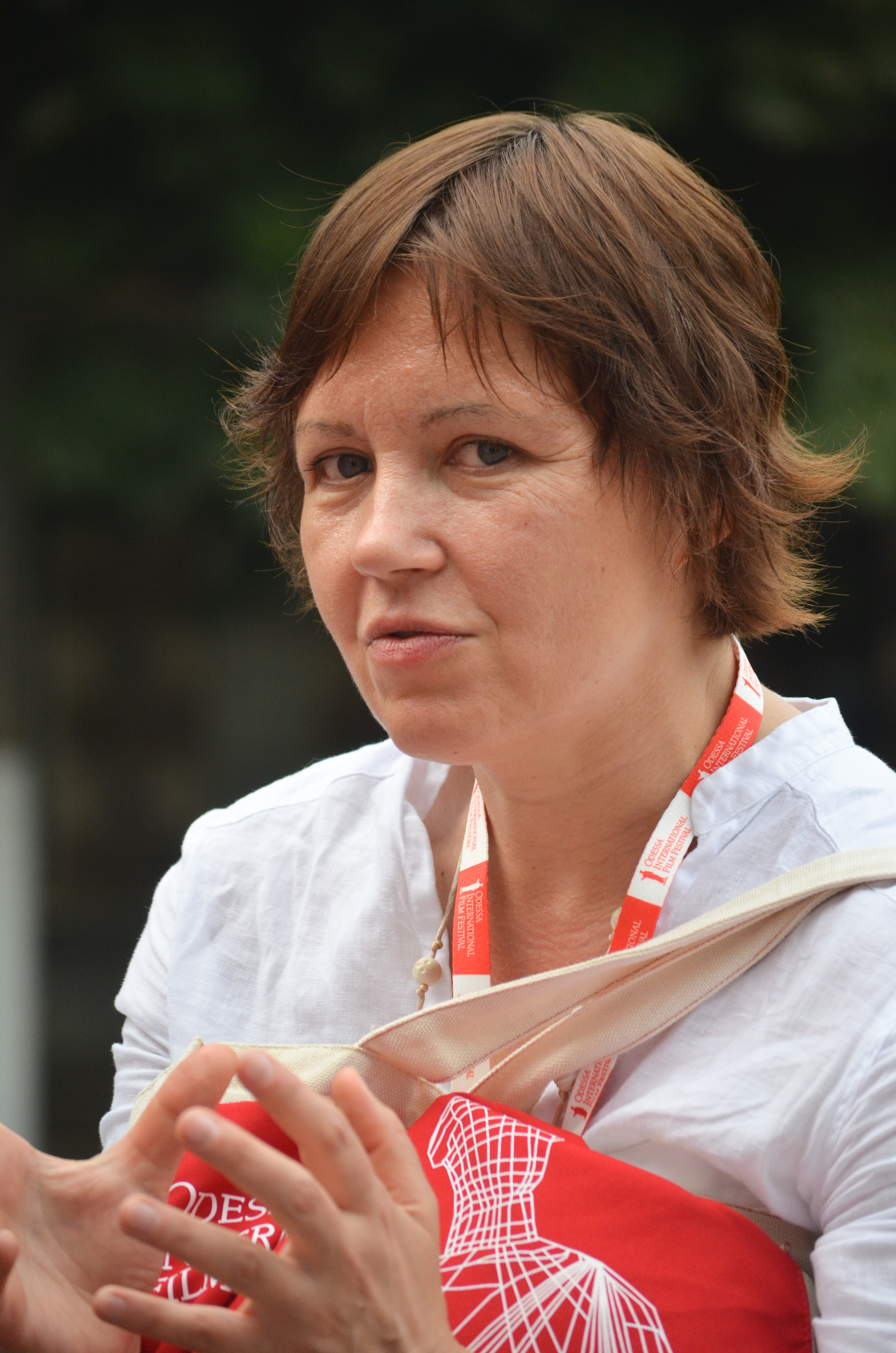
Alla Zahaikevych

Since Ukraine became independent in 1991, decisions made by the Ukrainian Opera House have been guided by market economy forces, and for this reason its repertoire has concentrated more on popular works. Some 19th century Ukrainian operas have been staged, but of the domestically produced operas of the Soviet era, only a few works on historical themes have remained in the repertoire, such as Yaroslav the Wise by Maiboroda, Bohdan Khmelnytsky by Dankevych, and Mejtus's Stolen Happiness. For living composers, it has been almost impossible to stage new works, although small-scale works have been successfully produced. These include Hubarenko's operas Remember, My Brothers!, Karmella Tsepkolenko's Portrait of Dorian Gray (1990) and Between Two Fires (1994), Oleksandr Kozarenko's The Hour of Repentance (1997), Kolodub's opera about Shevchenko The Poet (1988, premiered in 2001), and Village Opera by Stankovych, which was first performed in 2011 in Tyumen.

An exception in this trend, and (as of 2014) the only new domestic opera performed on the big opera stage since Ukraine's independence, is Moses. This work by Skoryk, first mentioned in 2001 on the occasion of Pope John Paul II's visit to Ukraine, was staged in two opera venues—in Lviv and Kiev. Some of the production costs for the premiere were borne directly by the Vatican.

Other notable operas written by Ukrainian composers since 1991 include:

- Valentin Bibik's only opera, Run, was based on the play of the same name by Mikhail Bulgakov;
- Vitaly Kyreiko's opera Boyarynya was written in 2003 and premiered in 2008.
- Virko Baley's The Holodomor, about the famine in Soviet Ukraine that killed millions of Ukrainians during the winter of 1932/1933, was premiered in 2013; (Note: The chamber version of the piece was produced in Las Vegas and in Kyiv the same year.)
- Alexander Shchetinsky's opera Bestiary was staged at the Kharkiv Opera and Ballet Theatre in 2011;
- Shchetinsky's opera Interrupted Letter, which was based on the works of Shevchenko, was produced in Vienna in 2015;
- In 2021, Ivan Nebesnyy's opera Lys Nikita was produced at the Lviv National Opera;
- Alla Zahaikevych's opera Embroidered. King of Ukraine was premiered at the Kharkiv National Opera in 2021.

== Opera houses ==
There are seven opera houses in Ukraine:

- The Taras Shevchenko National Opera of Ukraine in Kyiv. The first city theatre was built in around 1803, the building was replaced by a new building in 1856. The current building (rebuilt after being destroyed in a fire in 1896) reopened in 1901.
- Kharkiv National Academic Opera and Ballet Theatre named after Mykola Lysenko. Modern postmodern building of 1991–1992, in the historic building (1884–1885) is the Kharkiv Philharmonic.
- Odesa National Academic Opera and Ballet Theatre. The first city theatre was built in 1810; the present building dates from 1926.
- The Solomiya Krushelnytska Lviv National Academic Opera and Ballet Theatre (or Lviv Opera) operates in the building of the former Polish Opera House, built in 1897–1900.
- Anatoliy Solovyanenko Donetsk Academic State Opera and Ballet Theatre. Located in a building erected in 1941.
- Dnipropetrovsk Opera and Ballet Theatre. Opened in 1974.
- Kyiv Municipal Academic Opera and Ballet Theatre for Children and Youth. Founded in 1982.
Gallery of opera houses

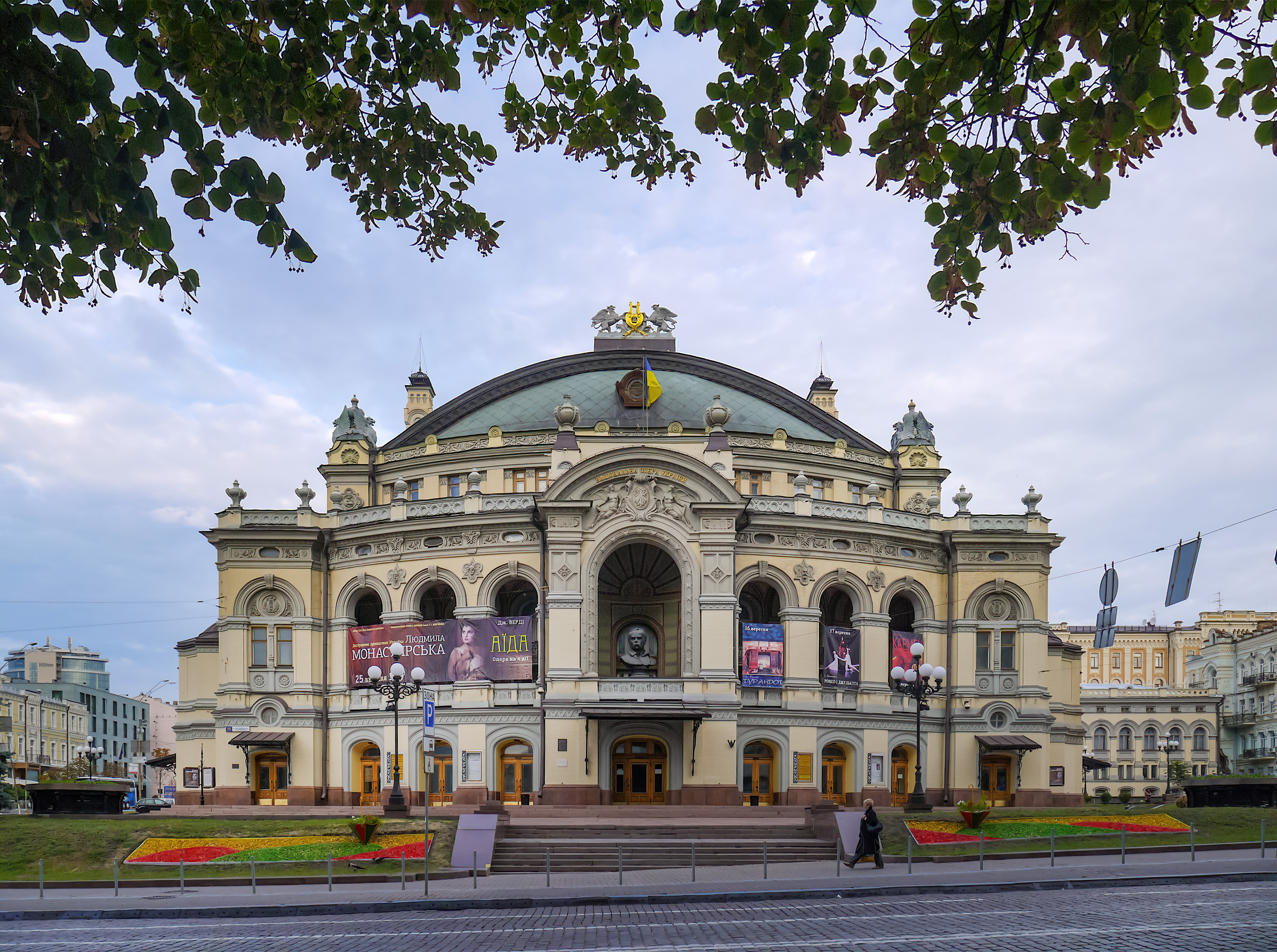
National Opera of Ukraine, Kyiv

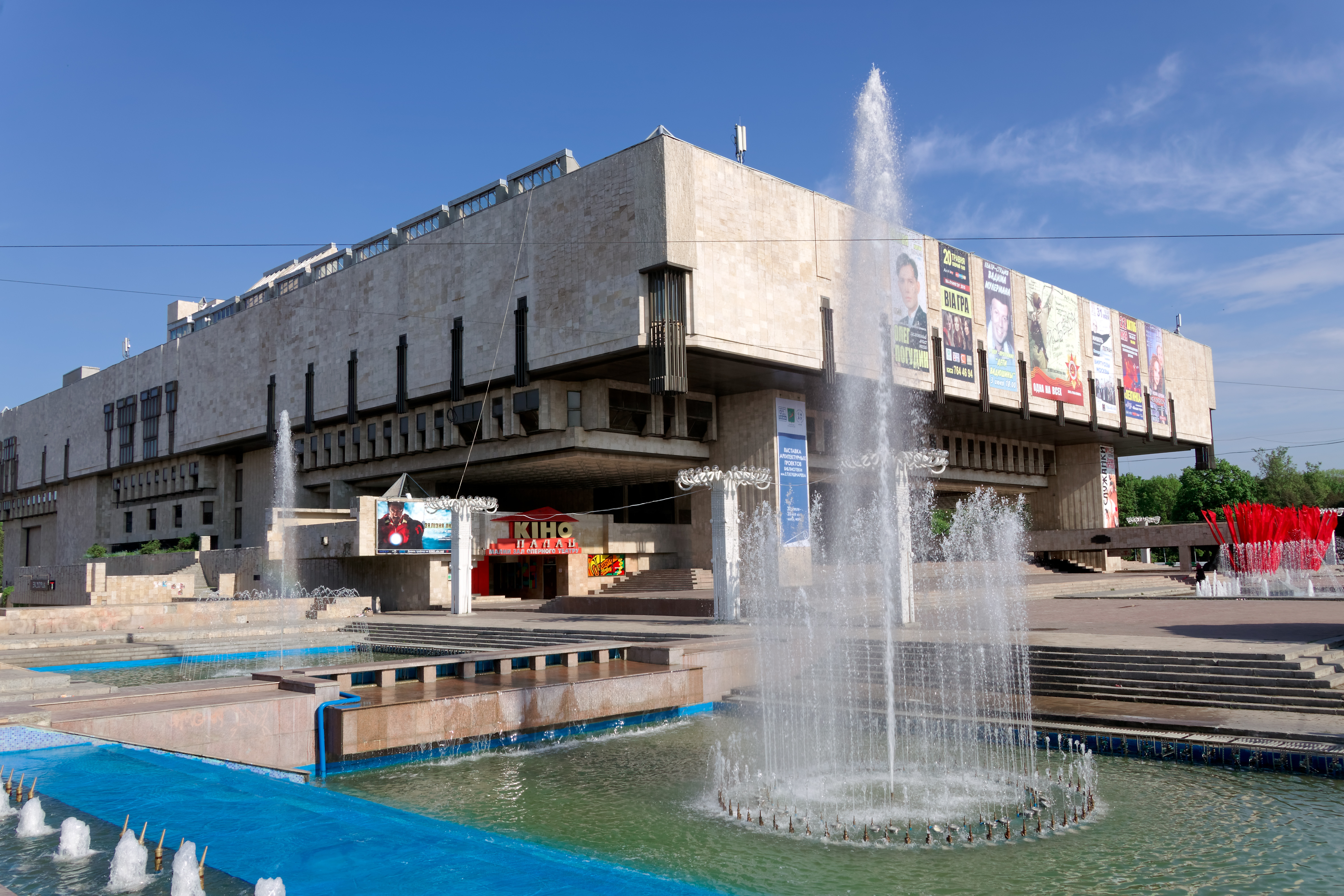
Kharkiv National Academic Opera and Ballet Theatre, photographed in 2010

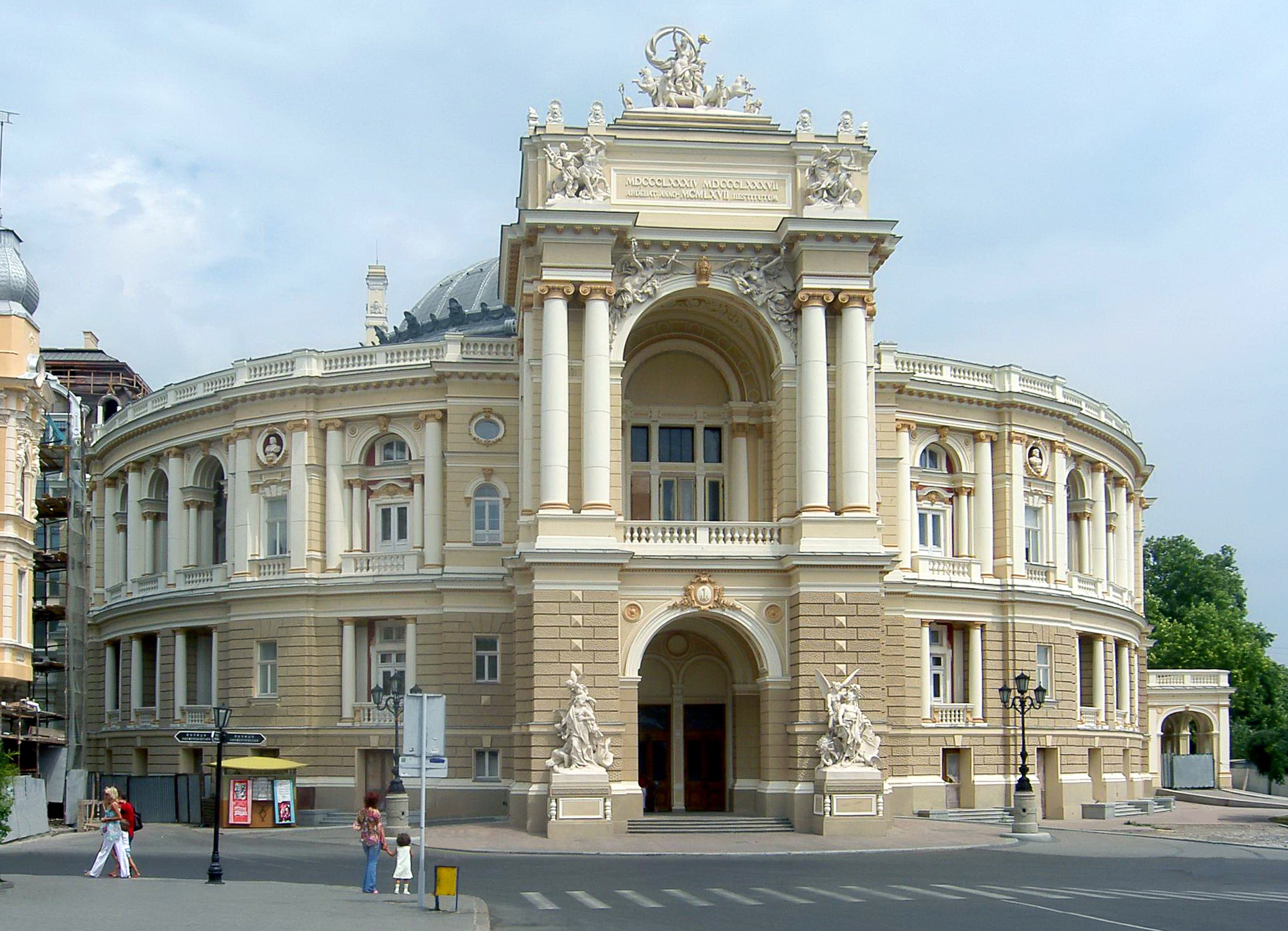
Odesa Opera and Ballet Theatre

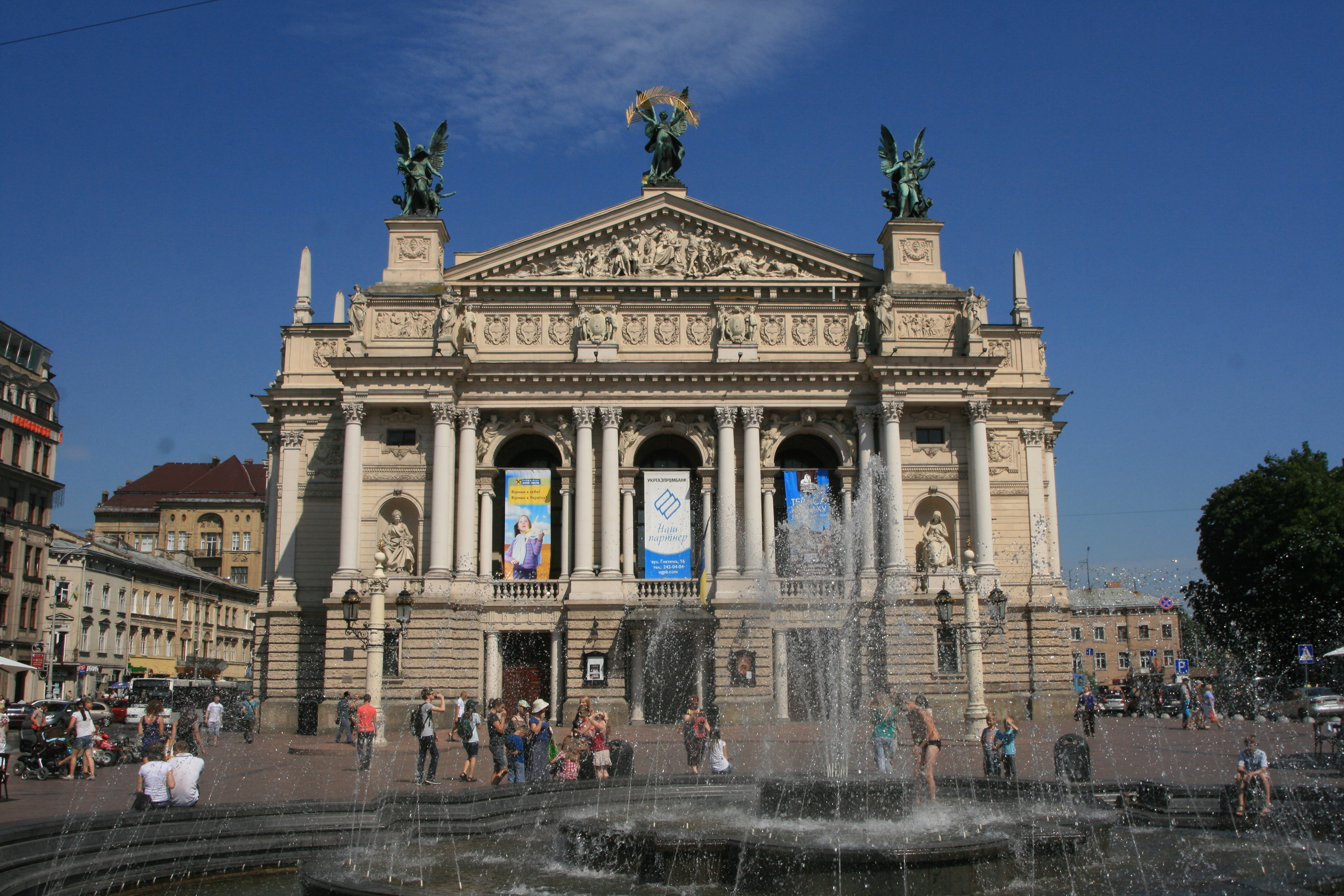
Lviv Opera

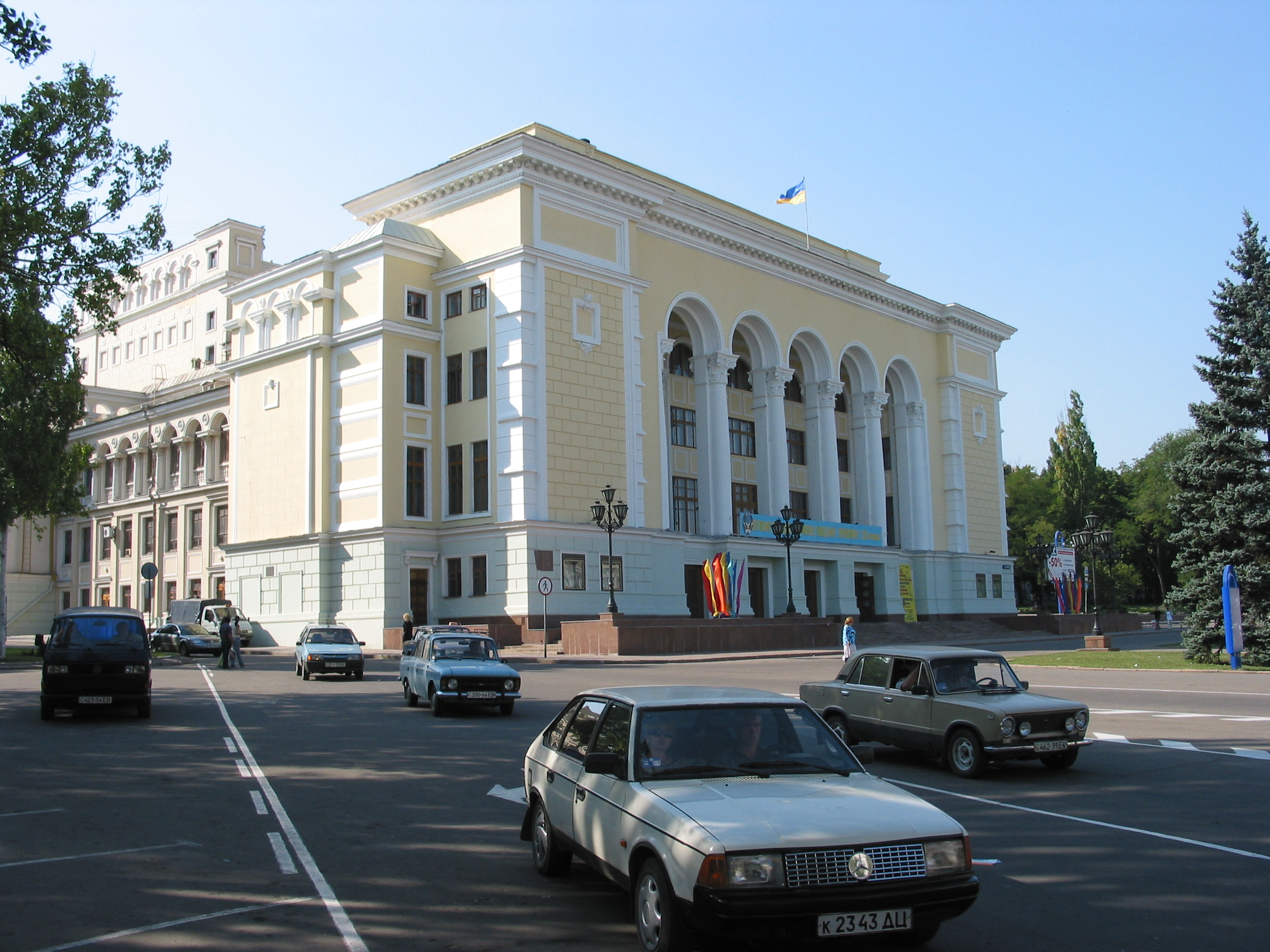
Donetsk State Academic Opera and Ballet Theatre

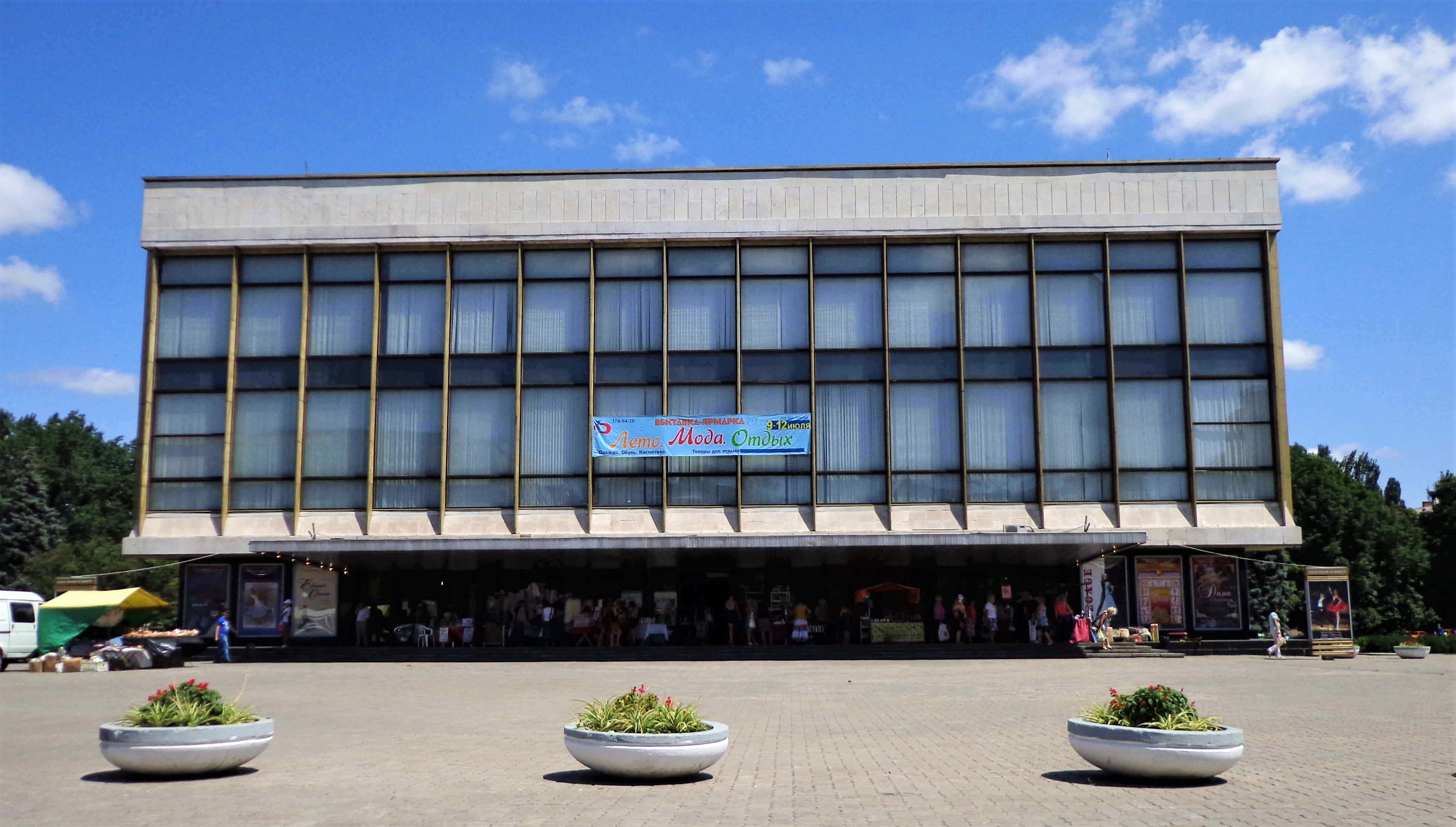
Dnipropetrovsk Opera and Ballet Theatre

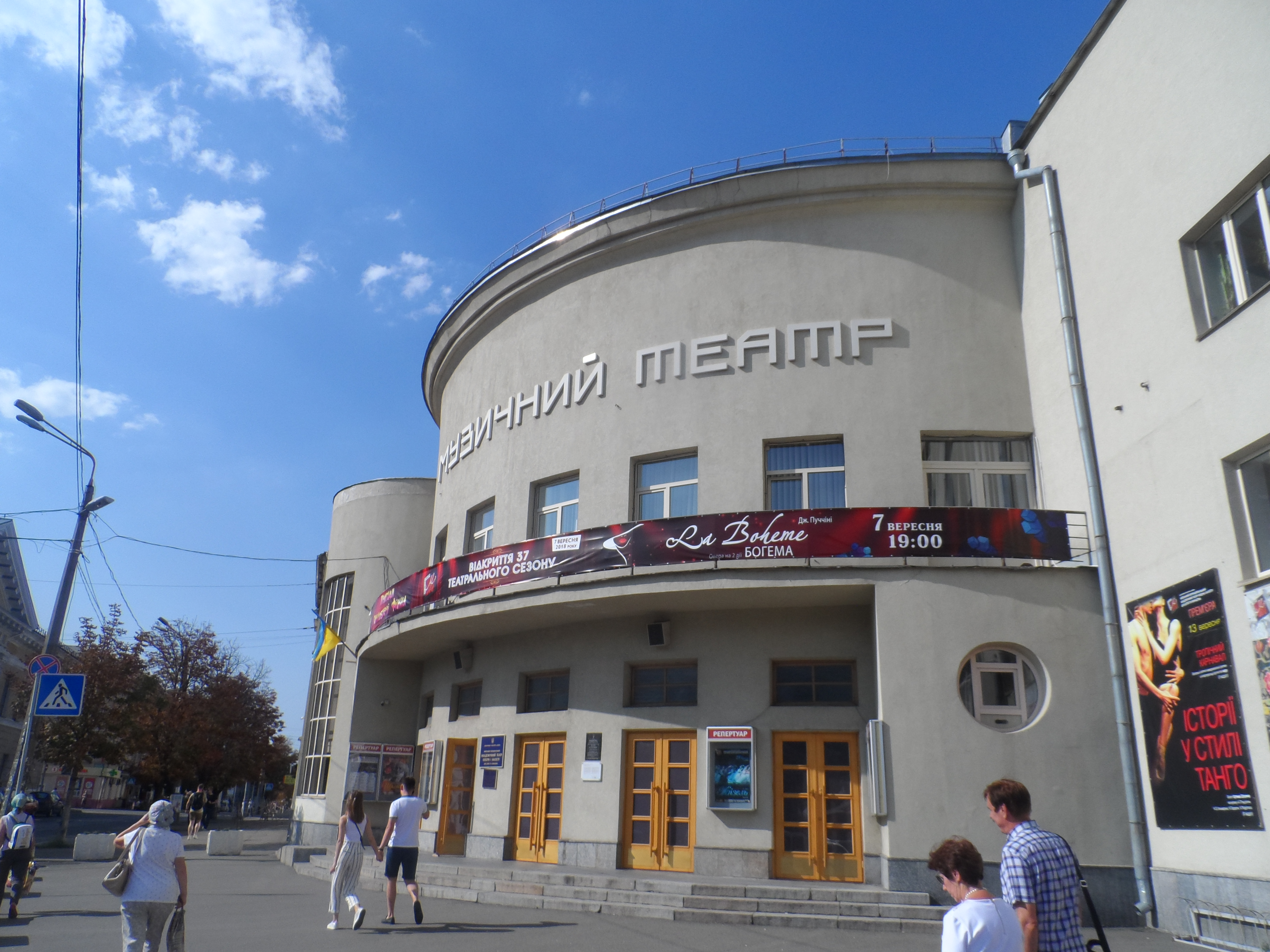
Kyiv Municipal Academic Opera and Ballet Theatre for Children and Youth

== See also ==
- Theater in Ukraine
