= Nocturne (Lysenko) =

1912 opera in one act by Mykola Lysenko

- Opera by Mykola Lysenko
- Librettist: Liudmyla Starytska-Cherniakhivska
- Language: Ukrainian
- Based on: song "Vremia Nevozvratnoe"
- Premiere: Kyiv

Nocturne is an opera in one act by the Ukrainian composer Mykola Lysenko written in 1912 and first performed in Kyiv soon after composer's death.

Libreto to this opera wrote Liudmyla Starytska-Cherniakhivska (1868–1941), the daughter of Mikhailo Starytsky (1840–1904), who was Lysenko's friend. The same as in the previous opera Eneid", Lysenko retreated from patriotic themes and folklore and chose a modern plot, in which a folk song and romantic song contrast to each other as representations of the past and modern. As a characteristic motive for the old world, the composer chose the salon song "Vremia Nevozvratnoe", which sings his mother Olga Eeremiyevna Lutsenkova. According to Sigrid Neef, "this opera geniusly reflects the position of the intellectual between the bourgeois revolution defeated and the socialist revolution".

The opera entered the repertoire of Ukrainian theaters (for example, in 1927 it was first placed in Odessa), and in the 1930s it was broadcast on the radio in Lviv. Opera rarely falls into the repertoire of theaters, but performed in opera studios of musical educational institutions, in particular conservatories in Kyiv and Lviv.
