= Oleksandr Kozarenko =

Ukrainian pianist (1963–2023)

Oleksandr Kozarenko Олександр Козаренко
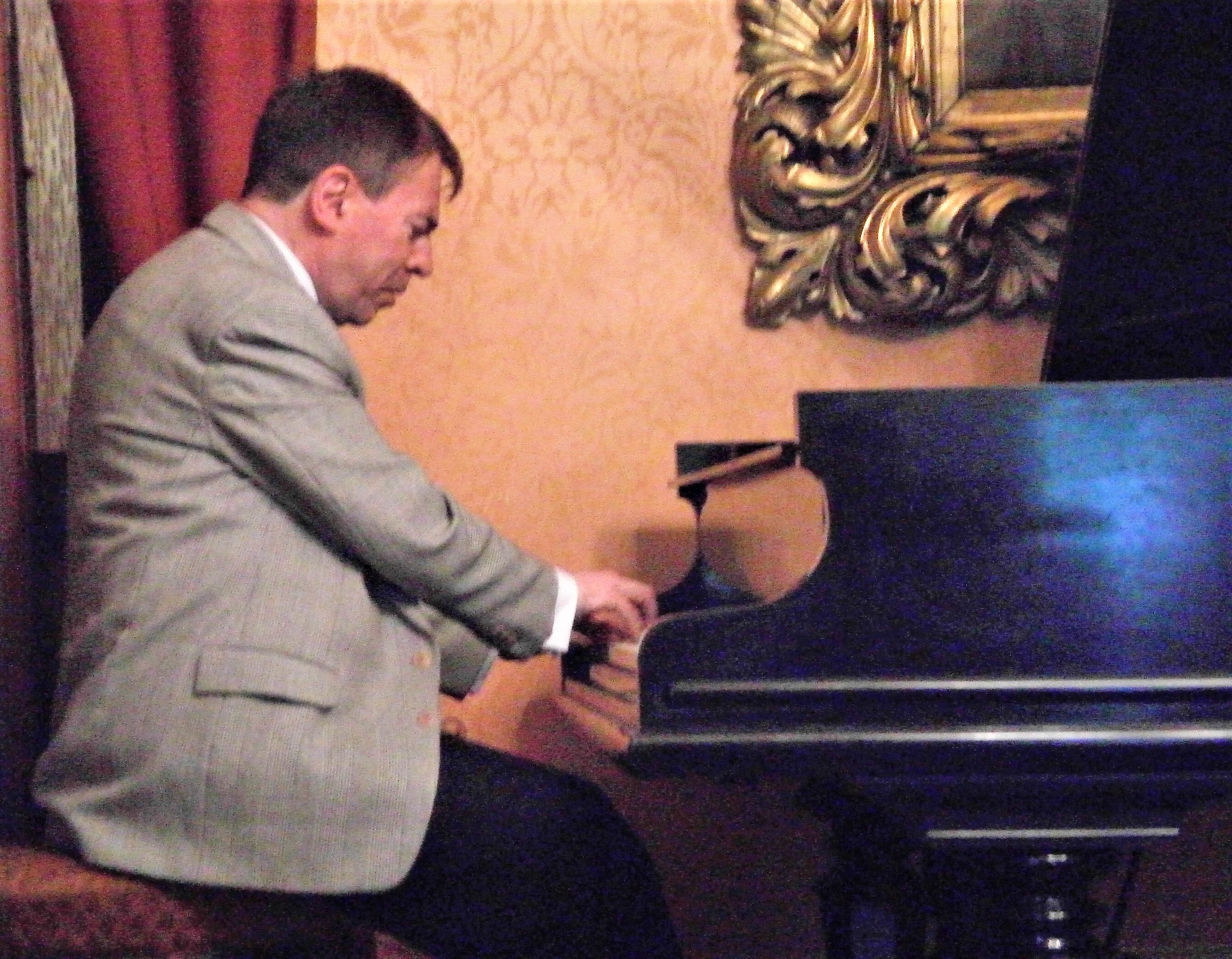
- Kozarenko performing in Solomiya Krushelnytska museum in Lviv, Ukraine
- Born: 24 August 1963; Kolomyia
- Died: 21 March 2023 (aged 59); Ivano-Frankivsk, Ukraine
- Education: Kyiv Conservatory
- Occupations: Composer; Pianist; Musicologist
- Organizations: Lviv Music Academy; International Society for Contemporary Music

Oleksandr Kozarenko (Ukrainian: Олександр Козаренко; 24 August 1963 – 21 March 2023) was a Ukrainian composer, pianist, and musicologist.

== Biography ==
Kozarenko was born in Kolomyia of Ivano-Frankivsk Oblast. He was a graduate of Kyiv Conservatory where he studied piano with Vsevolod Vorobyov and composition with Myroslav Skoryk. In 1984, he was a winner of the Mykola Lysenko International Music Competition, and in 1986 won the All-Ukrainian Competition. He was a recipient of the Levko Revutsky Prize in 1996, and of the Mykola Lysenko Prize in 2001.

Kozarenko was a teacher at the Lviv National Music Academy from 1992, heading its department of music theory from 2006 to 2010. He then worked for the Ivan Franko National University in Lviv and was a visiting professor at the Ukrainian Free University in Munich. He composed works for Kyiv Camerata and Trembita Capella. He participated in festivals such as Bratislava's Melos-Ethos and Days of the Kraków Composers Music as well as his national debut at the Two Days and Two Nights of New Music festival in Odesa. Since 1991 he composed such works as the Concerto Rutheno, Don Juan from Kolomea and Passion of Our God Jesus Christ. In 1996 and 1998, he arranged compositions by other composers such as the David's Psalter and Oresteia among other works.

Kozarenko died from COVID-19 in Ivano-Frankivsk, on 21 March 2023, at age 59.
