= Moses (Skoryk) =

2001 opera by Myroslav Skoryk

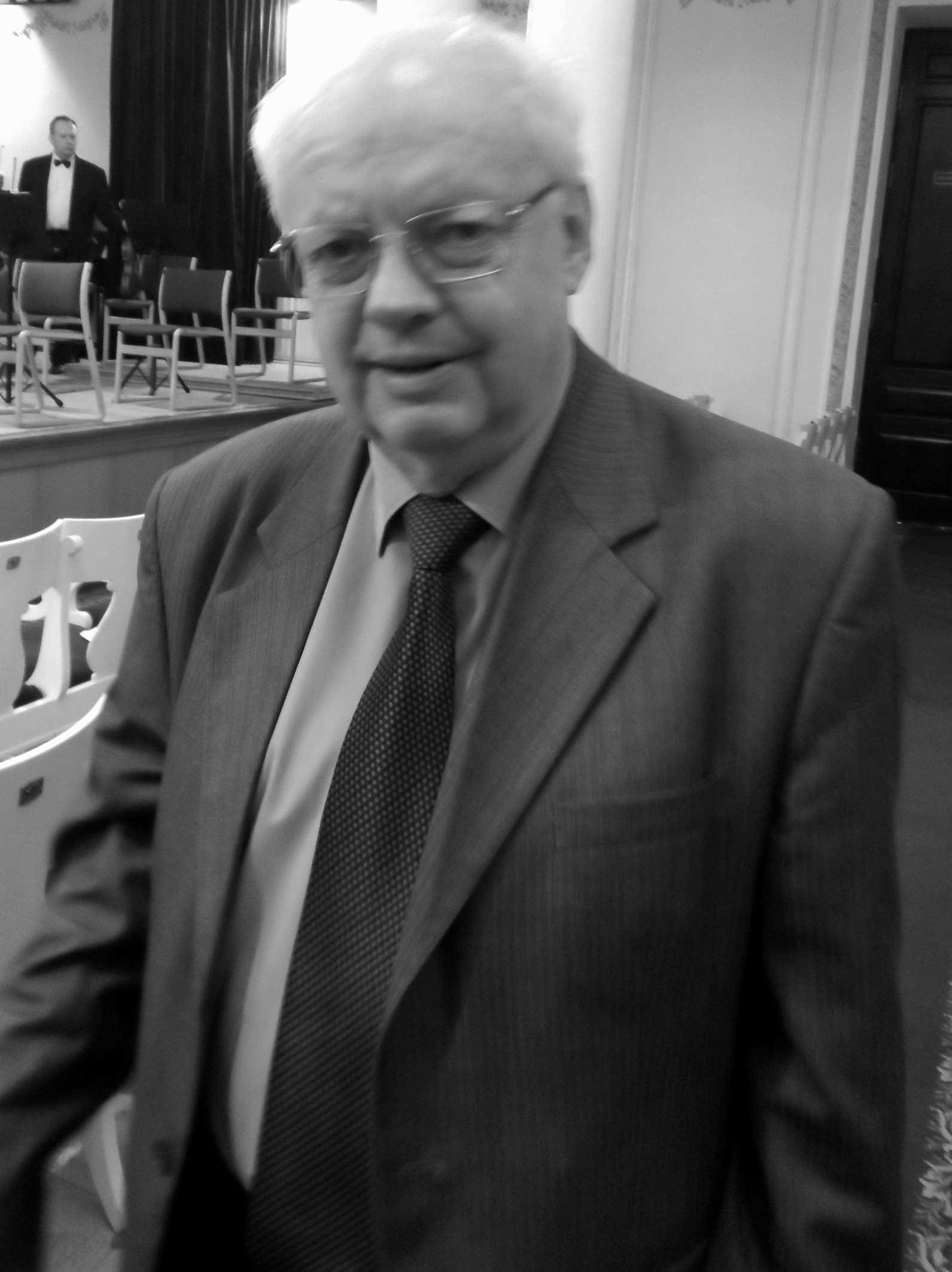
Myroslav Skoryk

Moses (Ukrainian: Мойсей) is an opera by Myroslav Skoryk, based on the 1905 poem of the same name by Ivan Franko. The libretto is by the composer and Bogdan Stelmakh. The opera is divided into two acts and five scenes, with a prologue and epilogue. It was first performed at the Lviv Theatre of Opera and Ballet on 20 May 2001, to coincide with the visit of Pope John Paul II to Ukraine (23–27 June 2001).

== Roles ==
Roles, voice types, premiere cast
Role	Voice type	Premiere cast, 20 May 2001
Moisei (Moses)	bass	Oleksander Hromysh
Aviron (Abiram)	baritone	Stepan Stepan
Datan	baritone	Andrij Beniuk
Azazel	tenor	Oleksij Danylchuk
Yegoshua (Joshua)	tenor	Vitalij Liskovetskyj
Liya	soprano	Vira Koltun
Yohaveda (Jochebed)	contralto	Natalia Svoboda
Narrator		Ihor Kushpler

== Synopsis ==
Franko's poem was conceived as an allegory of the Ukrainian people, which he saw as having great potential but weakened by political division. There are clear parallels implied between the struggle of the Israelites and the experience of Ukraine in the Soviet Union. The poem, based on the Moses of the Bible, sees Moses, after forty years leading the Children of Israel in the desert, under attack from a revolt by Dathan and Abiram. Moses tells the people about God but Dathan and Abiram do not believe him and threaten Moses with stoning. Moses is chased out of the camp they are in and banished; in his absence, the Israelites worship the Golden Calf.

In the desert, Moses is tempted by an evil spirit, Azazel, and also by the ghost of his mother Jochebed, who seek to get him to renounce God (Jehovah). Jehovah creates a storm in which Moses is swept away. The Israelites search for Moses and fear he is dead. This causes panic among the Israelites who condemn Dathan and Abiram to death. Lea and Joshua call the people to arms and Joshua prepares to lead them to the Promised Land.

The opera ends with an epilogue in which the characters call out for peace for the people, the land, and peace with God. The characters have not yet reached the Promised Land at the close of the story.

The prologue and epilogue of the original poem are an address by the poet to the Ukrainian people, making the parallels of the story explicit. They are retained in shortened form in the opera. The only significant story-line change in the opera is to introduce Joshua and his wife Lea (who does not appear at all in the poem or in the Bible) early in the story as defenders of Moses against Dathan and Abiram.

The opera was "the first Ukrainian opera on a biblical subject to be composed in nearly a century".

== Performances ==
In connection with the performance to coincide with Pope John Paul II's visit to Lviv, the Pope blessed the creators of the opera. This is reportedly "the only performance in the history of independent Ukraine which was financed by the Vatican and received a papal blessing".

The opera was performed by the National Opera of Ukraine between 2012 and 2016.

== Production ==
The opera was commissioned by the Lviv Opera to Myroslav Skoryk to commemorate the 100th anniversary of the theatre.

Production took over two years. Those involved included composer Mykhaylo Dutchak, director/producer Zbigniev Khshanovskuj, and Tadey Eder, director of the Lviv Theater.

Production was financially supported by the Western Ukrainian Commercial Bank.
