= Sydir Vorobkevych =

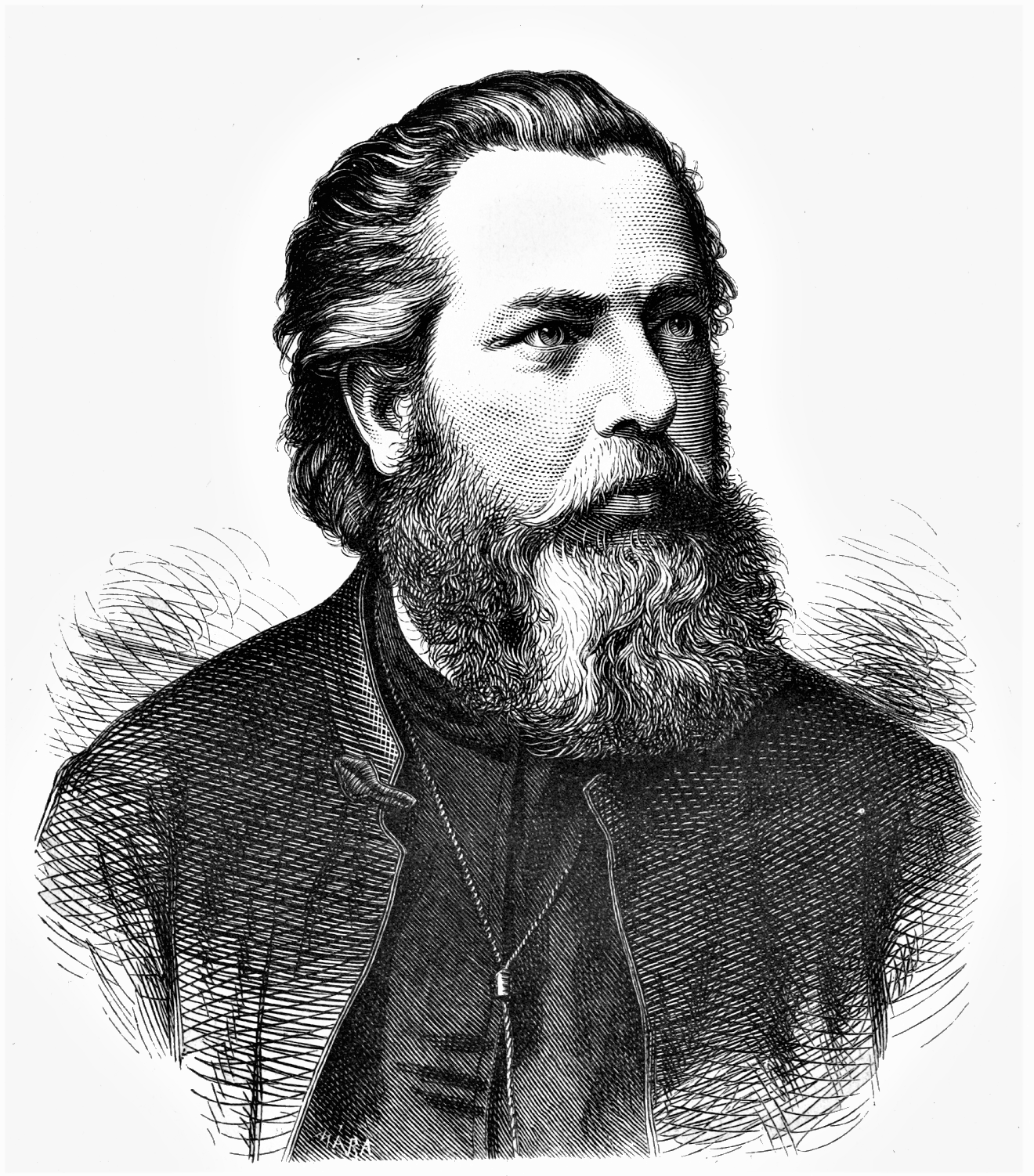
- An engraving of Vorobkevych from a 1881 edition of Světozor
- Born: May 5, 1836; Chernivtsi, Austrian Empire
- Died: September 19, 1903 (aged 67); Chernivtsi
- Occupations: composer, writer, Eastern Orthodox priest, teacher, and artist
- Known for: editor of the Austrian newspaper Bukovyna

Sydir Ivanovych Vorobkevych (Ukrainian: Сидір Іванович Воробкевич, Romanian: Isidor Vorobchievici; 17 May 1836 – 31 September 1903), (Note: Old Style dates 5 May 1836 – 31 September 1903) was a Ukrainian composer, writer, Eastern Orthodox priest, teacher, and artist. During his career he was the editor of the Austrian newspaper Bukovyna.

== Early life and education ==
Sydir Ivanovych Vorobkevych was born on 17 May 1836 (O.S.) in Chernivtsi (now in western Ukraine). His family were traditionally Orthodox priests and theologians. His brother was the Ukrainian poet Hryhoriy Vorobkevych.

Vorobkevych's mother, Elizabeta Corlătean, was an ethnic Romanian, being the daughter of the Protopope of Câmpulung Moldovenesc.

Sydir's paternal great-grandfather, Skalsky Mlaka de Orobko, ran away from Lithuania, and his grandfather changed his name from Orobko to Vorobkevych. He later used part of the former name as part of one of his pen-names, Danilo Mlaka. His mother died in 1840, and his father Ivan worked in the Chernivtsi Lyceum as a professor of religion and philosophy. After father died in 1845. the 9-year-old Sydir, along with his brother Hryhoriy, were left as orphans. They were then brought up by their grandfather, Mykhailo Vorobkevych, the Protopope of Kitsman.

In his family the young boy learned Ukrainian folklore and history. He enrolled in the Chernivtsi Lyceum and later the Theology Seminary in Chernivtsi, graduating in 1861. After his training, Vorobkevych began an internship as a parish priest in the neighbouring villages of Davydeny and Ruska Moldavytsia. Later he enrolled in the musical courses of the Vienna Conservatory under professor Franz Krenn. In 1868, the year he completed his studies at the conservatory, he took an examination to become a certified singing instructor and choir director. He then began work as a singing instructor in the Chernivtsi Theology Seminary and Lycem. In 1875 he became professor of theology at Chernivtsi University.

== Career as a composer, a writer, and a poet ==
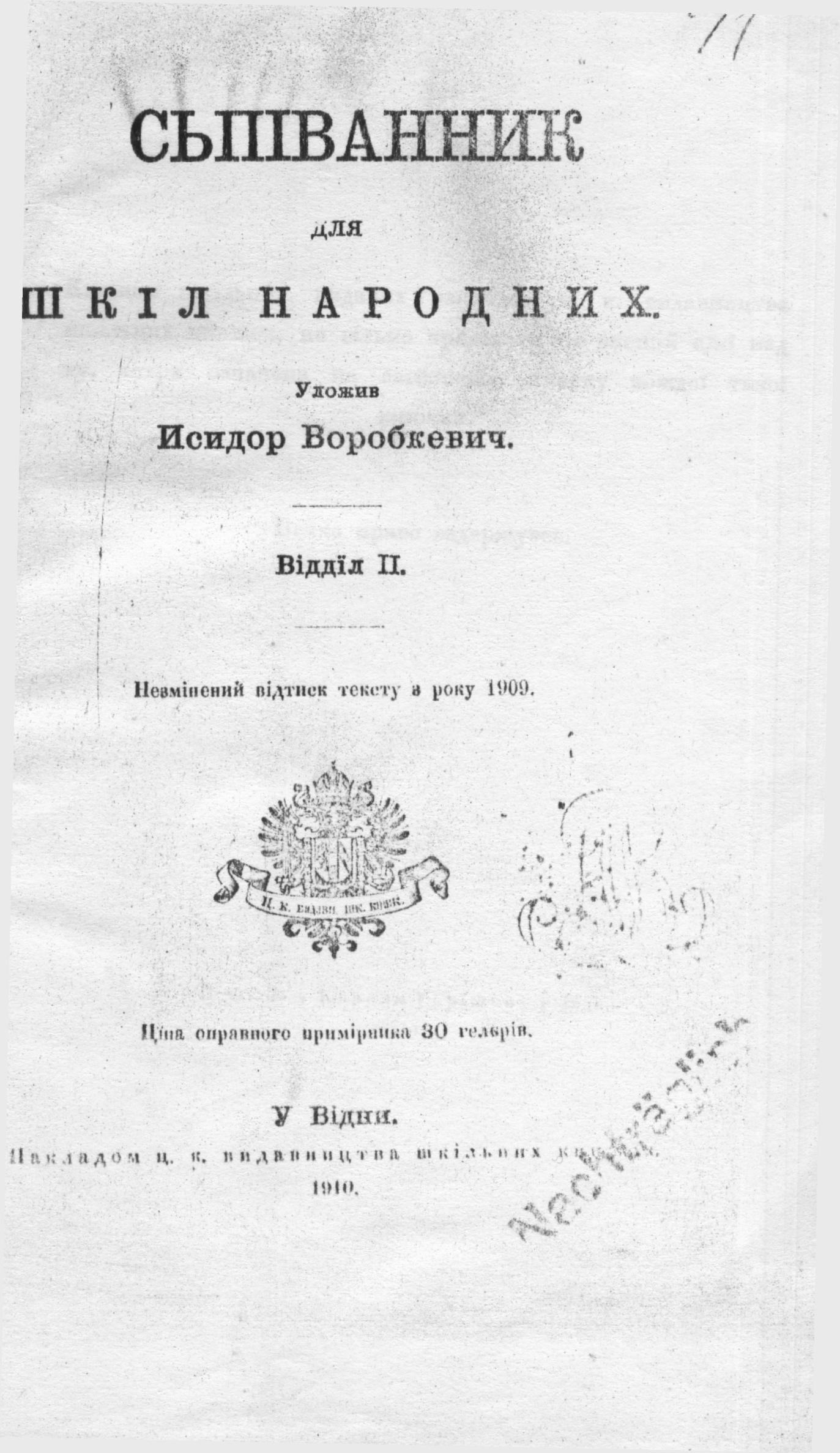
The front page of Songbook for Folk Schools, compiled by Vorobkevych in 1889

In 1875, Vorobkevych became a singing instructor at the Theological Department of the Chernivtsi University. During that time, he already worked as a composer creating his own songs, psalms, choir works, operettas, and others.

His first poetic works Vorobkevych published in 1863 in the Halychanyn collection under the title Thoughts from Bukovina. In 1877, he released the first Bukovina almanac Ruthenian hut. Sydir Vorobkevych was one of the creators and chief-editors of the magazine Bokovinian dawn. In Chernivtsi University he headed the "Ruthenian Literary Association" and, starting in 1876, the students' union - "Soyuz". In 1887, Vorobkevych was the leader of the association "Ruthenian house public" in Chernivtsi.

Writing in Ukrainian, German, and Romanian, he used several different pen-names, including Danylo Mlaka, Demko Makoviychuk, Morozenko, Semen Khrin, Isydor Vorobkevych, and S.Volokh. Among his works are "Turkish recruits" (1865), poem "Nechai" (1868), dramas "Petro Sahaidachny" (1884), "Kochubei and Mazepa" (1891), "Lost son".

Vorobkevych's talent is depicted most completely in his lyrical poems where the poet "spills the great riches of life's observations enlighten by a quiet sparkling of sincere, deep, human, and people-relating feeling" (Ivan Franko). The prominent characteristics of Vorobkevych's poetry are folklore and a melodious quality. After a trip to Kiev in 1874, he wrote choir works "Tsar-river our Dnieper" and "I was born upon Dnieper, therefore I am Cossack".

During his lifetime, a collection of his poems entitled on the Prut (1901) was published, edited by Ivan Franko, who called him the "first new spring lark of our national revival." A series of the poet's series of short stories, novels and essays, called Peru, included "Nero", "Sablya Skanderbeg", "Cleopatra," and "Ivan the Terrible". He was the author of a series of articles "Our composers," which prominently designated composer Mikhail Glinka. Vorobkevych wrote many and diverse the genre of literary, musical compositions - choruses, songs, and operettas. He wrote music to the words of Ukrainian and Romanian poets like Taras Shevchenko, Ivan Franko, Vasile Alecsandri, Mihai Eminescu, Vasile Bumbac. As a music teacher in particular, among his students was a prominent Austrian musicologist Ukrainian origin Eusebius Mandychevskyy.

Sydir Vorobkevych died on 19 September 1903 in Chernivtsi.

== Works ==
Vorobkevych is author of several didactic works, among which the following:

- "Manual of musical harmony" (Czernowitz, 1869);
- "Songs of Mass choir of St. John Chrysostom" (1869, ed. II, 1880);
- "Collection of songs for schools people" (Vienna, 1870 and 1889);
- "Songs for schools choral liturgical people" (Vienna, 1870 and 1880)
- "Kurze fur Schule und Haus allgemaine Musiklehre" (Vienna, 1871, ed. II, 1876);
- "Harmony. Collection of Choruses" (Vienna, 1886);
- "Liturgical Songs for male choir" (Czernowitz, 1887);
- "Liturgical Songs for mixed choir" (Czernowitz, 1890);
- "Liturgical Songs for two equal voices" (Czernowitz, 1896) - in collaboration with Eusebius Mandicevschi etc.
- Over 240 musical compositions (liturgical hymns, choirs worldly religious choirs).
- He was best known for his popular works, such as the operettas Kaspar Rumpel’maier (1874), Zolotyi mops (The Golden Pug, 1879), and Pani moloda z Bosniï (The Bride from Bosnia, 1880).
- He also composed music for psalms, and choral works to words by Taras Shevchenko, and original art songs for solo voice.
