= Mr Kotsky =

Ukrainian fairy tale and children's opera

Mr. Kotsky
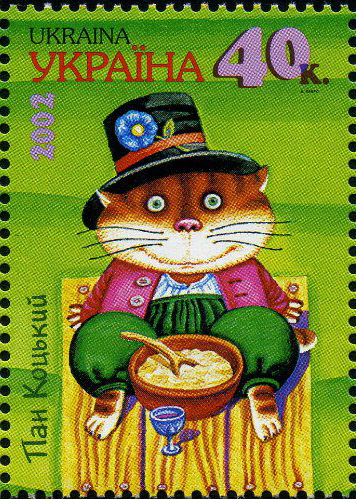
- Illustration of the Ukrainian fairy tale, Mr Kotsky, featured on a 2002 stamp of the Ukrainian postal service, Ukrposhta

Folk tale
- Name: Mr. Kotsky
- Also known as: Pan Kotsky, Sir Cat-o-Puss, Sir Puss O'Cat
- Region: Ukraine

Mr Kotsky (Ukrainian: «Пан Коцький», lit. 'Mister Cat-ish') is an 1891 children's opera, based on the traditional Ukrainian fairy tale. The Ukrainian fairy tale is also called "The Story of Mr Kotsky", Sir Cat-o-Puss, Pan Kotsky, or Sir Puss O'Cat. The 1891 children's opera, Mr Kotsky, is by the Ukrainian composer Mykola Lysenko, with a libretto by Dniprova Chayka.

== Fairy Tale Plot ==
There is a house cat named Cat. In some versions, Cat is abandoned in the woods by its master for being too old and no longer able to catch mice. Cat encounters a fox named Fox, and when introducing himself Cat changes his name to sound more impressive to Fox.

In Barbara Suwyn's retelling, Cat's house name is Pan Kotsky, and he introduces himself to Fox as Sir Puss O'Cat. In Christina Oparenko's retelling, Fox is called Vixen, and Cat introduces himself as Mr Kotsky. In Irina Zheleznova's retelling, Cat introduces itself as Sir Cat-O-Puss.

Cat introduces itself to Fox as a fierce animal. In response, Fox asks Mr Kotsky (Cat) to marry it and in return Fox promises to be a good wife and provide Mr Kotsky (Cat) a nice home.

Mr Kotsky (Cat) and Fox get married, forming a typical Ukrainian folklore couple, "a clever and active woman with a kind and passive man." Fox hunts and provides food for Mr Kotsky (Cat). Well-fed by Fox, Mr Kotsky (Cat) does indeed become strong and healthy. When Fox tells other animals in the forest about its husband, the other animals are interested and want to meet it. Fox declines, stating that her husband, Mr Kotsky, is too fierce. When one of the animals (sometimes Rabbit) peeks into Fox's window to look at Mr Kotsky (Cat), the animal looks at the same time as Cat waking up and reacting to being burned by an ember from the fireplace. The rude awakening causes Cat to react wildly, and seemingly confirms Fox's statement to the other forest animals that her husband, Mr Kotsky, is fierce. The animals still want to meet Mr Kotsky, and decide that is safer to do so as a group. They invite Fox and Mr Kotsky (Cat) to a dinner party to enjoy the soup, borscht, with Wolf, Boar, Rabbit, and Bear providing the ingredients for the soup and dinner. Fox agrees to the invitation, but states that the animals should hide until Mr Kotsky has had his fill, due to Mr Kotsky's fierceness. The other animals agree, and hide when it is time for dinner.

When Fox and Mr Kotsky (Cat) approach the dinner party, the other animals are hiding. Mr Kotsky (Cat) smells the borscht, and begins to meow, which the animals hear as "more". They cannot believe Mr Kotsky is asking for more soup before even eating, and marvel at Mr Kotsky's appetite. While Mr Kotsky is eating the borscht, the boar flicks its tail, which Mr Kotsky takes to be a mouse. Mr Kotstky lunges and bites the boar's tale out of instinct, mistaking it for a mouse. Boar then knocks the table over, scaring Bear who climbs higher in a tree until a smaller, higher branch breaks, which causes him to fall on the log where Rabbit is hiding. The log flies in the air and knocks Wolf in the head. The animals all run away, heal from their wounds, and marvel at their close call with the fierce Mr Kotsky.

== Modern culture ==
Mr Kotsky was the inspiration for a stamp of the Ukrainian postal service, Ukrposhta, in 2002.

Mr Kotsky is an 1891 children's opera by Ukrainian composer, Mykola Lysenko.

== Sources ==
- Spencer, Jennifer (2001). "Lysenko, Mykola Vytaliyovych". Grove Music Online. Oxford: Oxford University Press. doi:10.1093/gmo/9781561592630.article.17272. ISBN 978-1-56159-263-0. (subscription, Wikilibrary access, or UK public library membership required)
