= Borys Yanovskyi =

Borys Karlovych Yanovskyi

Borys Karlovych Yanovskyi or Janowsky (Ukrainian: Яновський Борис Карлович) (31 December 1875, Moscow – 19 January 1933, Kharkiv) was a Russian-born Ukrainian composer, music critic, conductor and teacher of German origin. His actual surname was Siegl. Yanovskyi lived and worked in St. Petersburg, Moscow, Kyiv and Kharkiv.

== Biography ==
Borys Karlovych Yanovskyi was born on 19/31 December 1875 in Moscow, the son of a German, Karl Siegl. His initial musical training was undertaken by his father, before he became a student of E. A. Ryb. Yanovskyi lived in Kyiv until 1910, where he graduated from Galagan College and Kyiv University (1903). He worked as a conductor, teacher, and critic. He lived in St. Petersburg from 1910. Between 1916 and 1917, he was the conductor of the Zimin Opera in Moscow. In 1918, he travelled back to Ukraine, becoming a teacher at the Music Technical College and the Music and Drama Institute in Kharkiv.

Member of the editorial board of the journal. "Music", head of the music department of the newspaper "Communist" in Kharkiv. Member of the Kharkiv branch of MTL. He worked in Kyiv as an employee of periodicals and magazines, at the same time he taught, had conducting practice and wrote critical articles. He was the first editor-in-chief of the magazine "The World of Art".

Yanovskyi died on 19 January 1933 in Kharkiv.

== Works ==
Yanovskyi's works include 10 operas, among them Sorochyn Fair (1899, from the short story of the same name by Nikolai Gogol), Two Pierrots, or Columbine (1907), Madajara (revised as Sister Beatrice (1907, revised 1910, after Maurice Maeterlinck), In 1812 (1912), Explosion (1927), The Witch (1916, after Anton Chekhov) and Duma Chornomorska, or Samiilo Kishka (1928) based on Ukrainian folk Duma about Samiilo Kishka. Yanovskyi adapted a work by Oscar Wilde into an operaThe Florentine Tragedy (1913, Odesa; 1916, Moscow; 1925, Kharkiv).

Yanovskyi composed two ballets, Arabian Night (1916) and Ferenji (1930), and a music comedy The Undertaker, based on a work by Alexander Pushkin (1923), Oriental Suite (1896), and the symphonic poems Vii (1899, after Gogol), and Faun and the Shepherdess (1902). Other musical compositions include Andante (1899), An Intermezzo on Ukrainian Themes (1928) and Zazdravnaya (1931) for strings, and piano works (including a suite (1924), and Bagels (18 children's plays, published in 1926)). He composed solo choral pieces, and arrangements of Ukrainian folk songs.

He proposed the term melo-poetry, in which the poem becomes an equal component in the artistic synthesis of the musical work. He created examples using the poetry of Ukrainian, Russian and European poets such as Maeterlinck, Alexander Blok, Konstantin Balmont, Mikhail Kuzmin, Anna Akhmatova, Sergei Yesenin, and Charles Baudelaire. Examples of other compositions include May Day from a Ukrainian text (1925); Airplane: [for chorus and piano (1926); Don't pity the ball (for bass and piano) (1926); Lena for mixed chorus (1926); Anthem to the Red Dawn (the finale from Explosion for mixed choir and piano, 1928); and The Dance of Labour for piano, 1928).

== Sources ==
- Bugaeva, Olena (2015). Biographical Dictionary (PDF) (in Ukrainian). Kyiv: National Academy of Sciences of Ukraine (National Library of Ukraine). pp. 316–317. ISBN 978-966-02-7512-6.
