= Hrynky =

Hrynky (Ukrainian: Гриньки) may refer to the following places in Ukraine:

- Hrynky, Poltava Oblast, village in Kremenchuk Raion
- Hrynky, Ternopil Oblast, village in Kremenets Raion
- Hrynky, Zhytomyr Oblast, village in Zviahel Raion
