= Sniderman =

Sniderman is a surname. Notable people with the surname include:

- Harry Sniderman, Canadian sports figure
- Jason Sniderman, Canadian musician and businessman
- Lisa Sniderman, American musician and playwright
- Paul Sniderman (born 1941), American political scientist
- Sam Sniderman (1920–2012), Canadian businessman
