= Mykola Lysenko House-Museum =

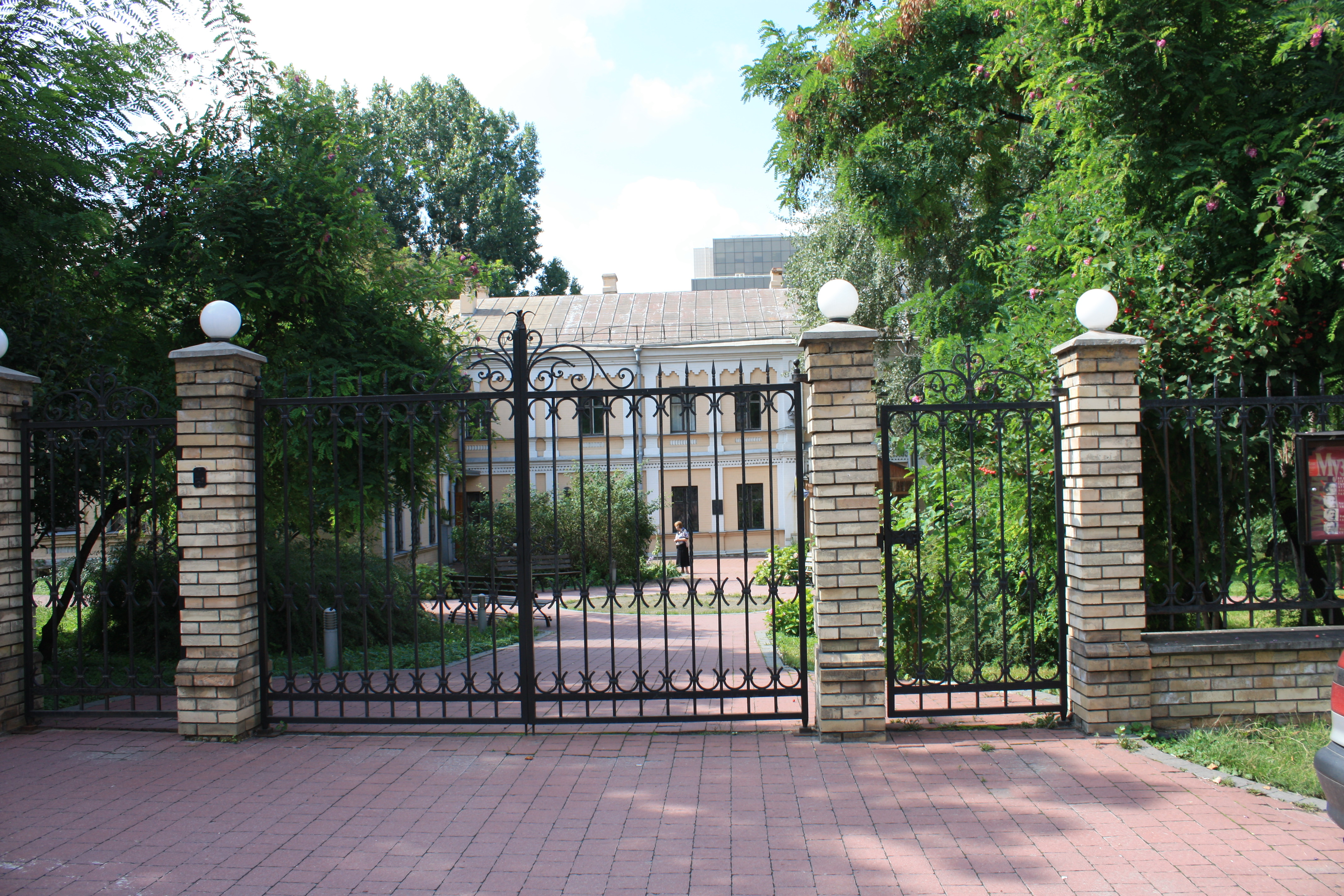
- Location: Saksahanskoho St., 95-b Kyiv, Ukraine
- Coordinates: 50.43°N 30.50°E

Immovable Monument of National Significance of Ukraine
- Official name: Будинок, у якому жив композитор М. В. Лисенко (House where the composer M. V. Lysenko lived)
- Type: History
- Reference no.: 260042-Н

The Mykola Lysenko House-Museum (Будинок-музей Миколи Лисенка) is one of the museums of outstanding figures of Ukrainian culture in Kyiv. It is located in the house of the teacher Mykola Gvozdik, where the Ukrainian composer Mykola Lysenko rented the 2nd floor from August 1894 to November 1912 (Kyiv, Saksahanskoho St., 95-b).

== History ==
The family of the Ukrainian composer occupied the 2nd floor of the house (built in 1894, architect Khoinatsky). It was here that Lysenko lived from 1894 until his death in 1912. The memorial zone of the museum is on the second floor.

The museum exhibition has been operating since 1980 (until 1987 - as part of the State Museum of Theater, Music, and Cinema of Ukraine).

== Exhibition ==
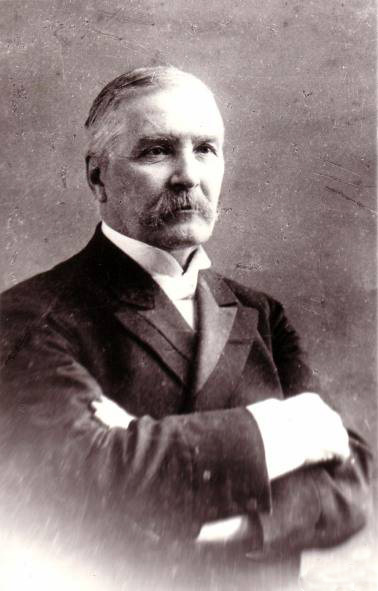
Mykola Lysenko

The first floor is dedicated to the work of the composer. The museum's collection includes the personal creative archive of the composer, which was previously located in the office of the Museum of Mykola Lysenko at the National Music Academy of Ukraine, exhibits of the Theater Museum, as well as donated by the composer's descendants.

In the living room, there is a Blütner concert grand piano and a portrait of M. Lysenko by Osip Kurilas.

On the second floor, there is the composer's study, where most of Lysenko's furniture and personal belongings are kept, recreated according to documentary photographs. Among his personal belongings are Lysenko's conductor's baton inlaid with mother-of-pearl, and silver laurel wreaths that were presented to the composer.

The authentic parquet flooring and stucco moldings have been restored. The tiled stoves have been preserved. The walls are decorated with Ukrainian folk musical instruments from the Lysenko collection: a wheeled lyre, a torban, cymbals, and a kobza. Here Nikolai Lysenko worked on the operas: "Taras Bulba," "Eneida," "Nocturne," and on the latest editions of "Music to 'Kobzar'," adaptations of folk songs, and his most famous piano works.

== Concerts ==
The museum not only introduces the life and work of the Ukrainian composer, but it also hosts concerts of young composers and vocalists.

Creative evenings and festivals are held regularly.

On March 15, 2015, the museum hosted the third concert from the series "World Classics in Ukrainian" entitled "Mykola Lysenko and His Contemporaries."

The project "World Musical Classics — in Ukrainian" was proposed by a member of the NGO "Wikimedia Ukraine" Andriy Bondarenko in 2011, and is aimed at reviving the tradition of performing vocal works by composers of different national schools in Ukrainian translations.

On April 22, 2015, to celebrate the 105th anniversary of the "Eneida," M. Lysenko initiators and participants of the joint project of the Museum of Mikola Lysenko and the Kyiv Institute of Music named after R. Glier, presented to the audience the most vivid fragments of this forgotten composition.

== Gallery ==
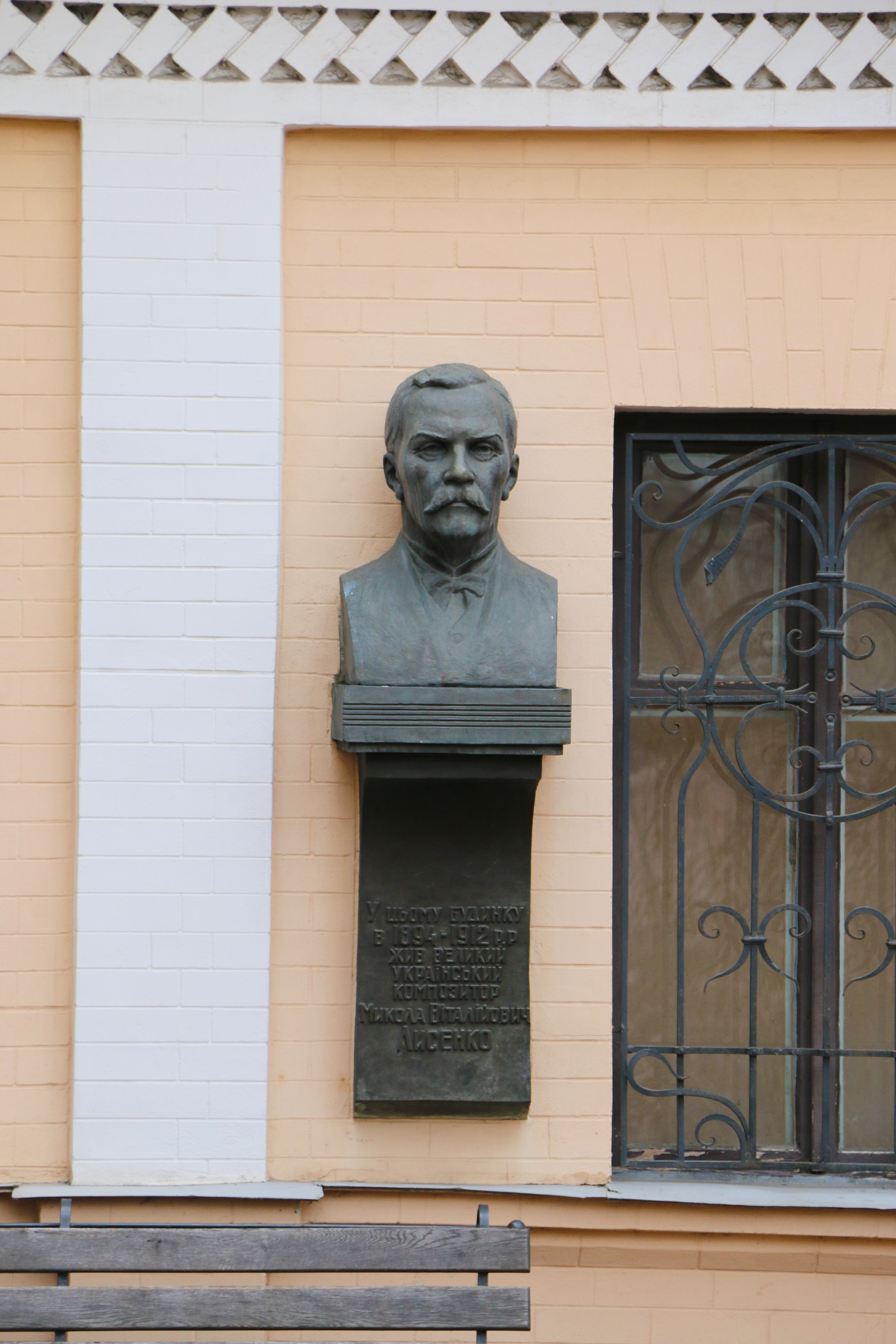
Bust monument to Lisenko

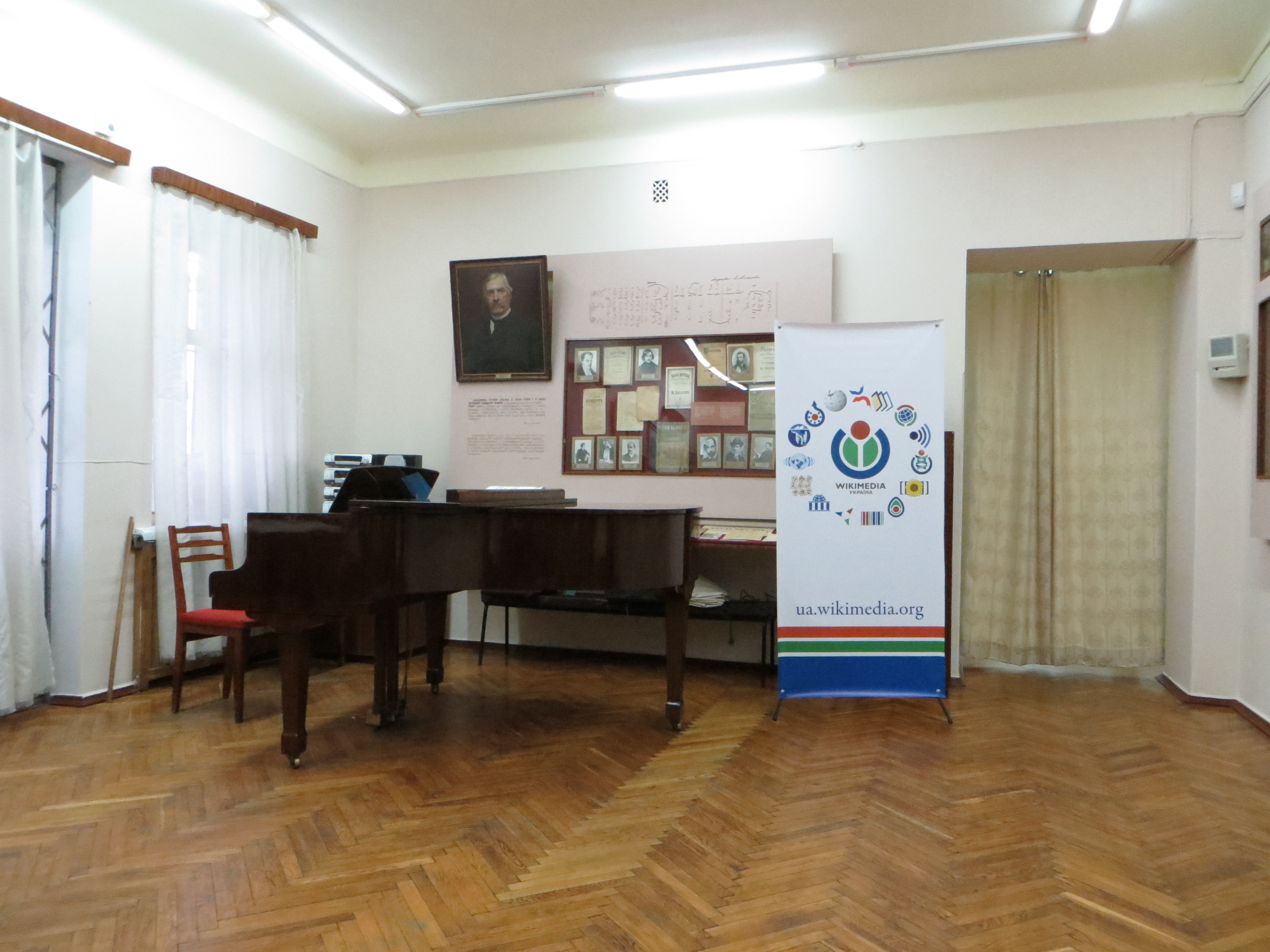
Second floor of the museum

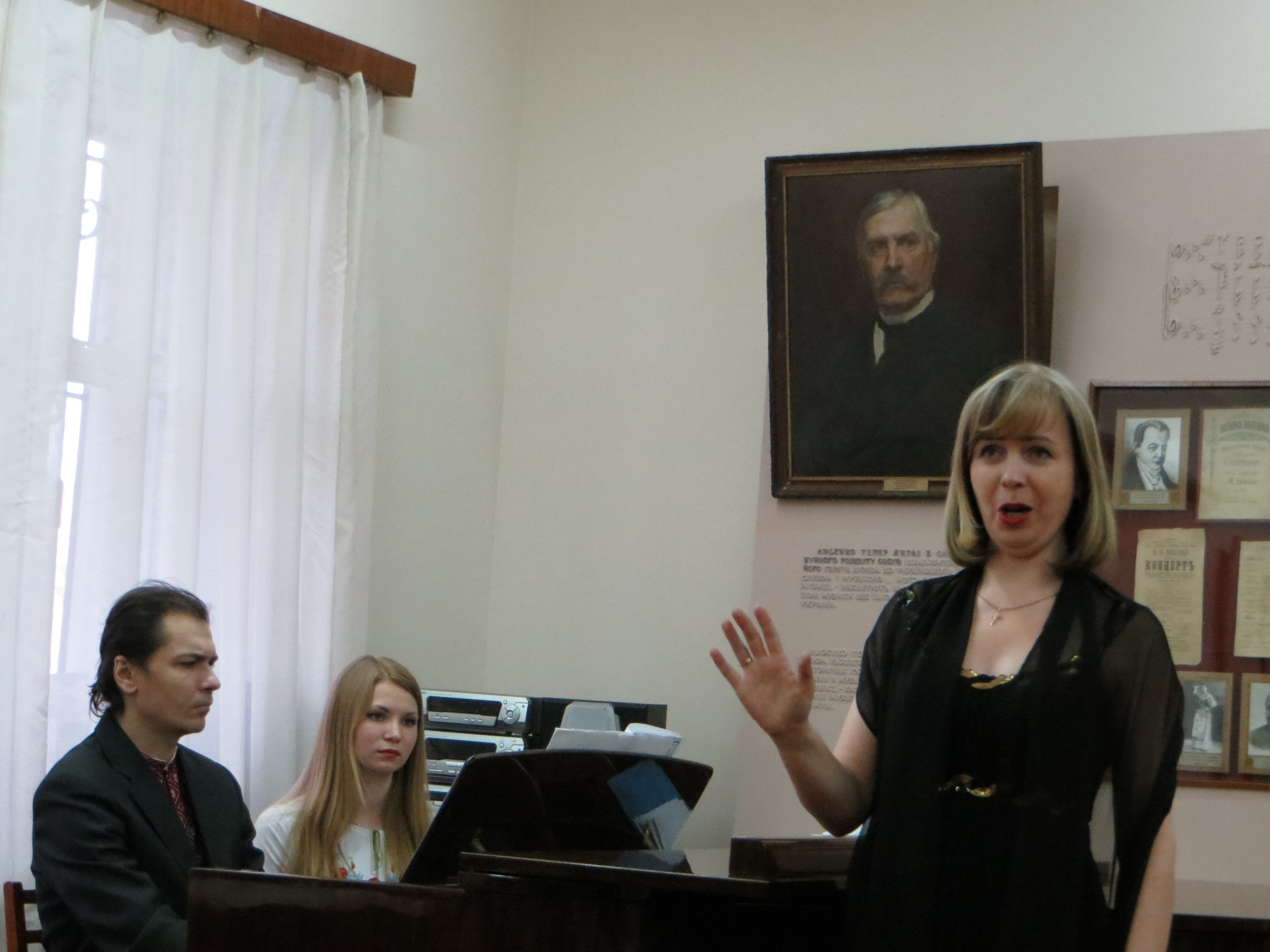
Concert at the House-Museum

== See also ==
- Lysenko music school
- Mykola Lysenko International Music Competition
- Mykola Lysenko
