= Bully Goat =

Ukrainian folk tale

The Bully Goat
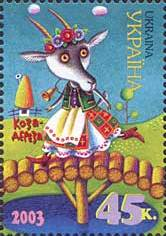
- 2003 stamp of Ukrainian national postal service, Ukrposhta, featuring Koza-Dereza

Folk tale
- Name: The Bully Goat
- Also known as: Koza-Dereza, Koza Dereza, Billy Goat's Bluff, or Nibbly-Quibbly the Goat
- Region: Ukraine

Bully Goat (Ukrainian: «Коза-дереза», romanized: Koza-Dereza), also called Koza-Dereza, Koza Dereza, Billy Goat's Bluff, or Nibbly-Quibbly the Goat, is a Ukrainian fairy tale, folk tale, and fable about a goat who acts like a bully.

== Plot ==
An old man and woman buy a goat (Bully Goat), then leave their older son to take care of it. Afterward, when they ask Bully Goat whether it has had enough to eat and drink, the Bully Goat replies with a rhyme, saying that while it tried to eat and drink as it went past trees and water, it was not allowed to eat or drink. Angered, the old man tells the son that the son can no longer live in the house. Next, the younger son is given the same task with the same result. Next, the old woman, with the same result. Finally, the old man himself takes care of Bully Goat, and when the old man asks Bully Goat the same question, whether it has had enough to eat and drink, the Bully Goat replies with the same rhyme that it has not had anything to eat or drink.

Now, angry at Bully Goat, the old man goes to the blacksmith to sharpen his knife in preparation to butcher Bully Goat. Before the old man can do so, Bully Goat escapes.

Bully Goat hides in Rabbit's (a rabbit's) house. With a different rhyme that is now threatening, Bully Goat scares off Rabbit. Rabbit runs to Bear (a bear), and explains what happened, referring to Bully Goat as a terrible beast. Bear goes in to drive Bully Goat out, but is also scared by the rhyme. Next, help is sought from Wolf (a wolf) with the same result. Fox (a fox) is consulted with the same result. Finally, Crayfish (a crayfish) is consulted. Rabbit explains that the beast was too fearsome even for Bear, Wolf, and Fox. Crayfish tells the group that it will drive the terrible beast (Bully Goat) out. Bully Goat replies with the same threatening rhyme. Crayfish climbs onto the stove then tells its own rhyme, referring to its claws. Crayfish then nips Bully Goat with its claws. Bully Goat cries out, then runs away, allowing Rabbit to return to its home and to thank Crayfish.

== In Culture ==
- Koza-Dereza is a children's opera written by Mykola Lysenko and first performed in Kyiv in 1890.
- Billy Goat's Bluff is a 1981 film from Canada directed by Ariadna Ochrymovych and starring Chris Wiggins, Karen Daplisea, and Billyann Balay.
- Koza-Dereza is a 1995 short animation by Ukranimafilm, directed by Iryna Smyrnova, starring Nina Kastorf and Andrey Podubinskiy.
- Koza-Dereza was featured on a 2003 stamp of Ukraine's national postal service, Ukrposhta.
- A 2012 book illustrated by Oleh Petrenko-Zanevsky published by A-BA-BA-HA-LA-MA-HA in English and Ukrainian.
- Koza Dereza is a restaurant operating in Kyiv.

== See also ==
- Ukrainian fairy tale
- Ukrainian animation
