= Nikolai Dmitriev =

Nikolai Dmitriev or Nikolay Dmitriyev (Russian: Николай Дмитриев) may refer to:

- Nikolai Dmitriev (composer) (1829–1893), Russian pianist and composer
- Nikolai Dmitriev (linguist) (1898–1954), Soviet linguist
- Nikolai Dmitriev-Orenburgsky (1838–1898), born Nikolai Dmitrievich Dmitriev, Russian painter
- Nikolay Kashkin (1839–1920), a pseudonym
