= Sophia Agranovich =

Ukrainian-American pianist

Sophia Agranovich Софія Агранович
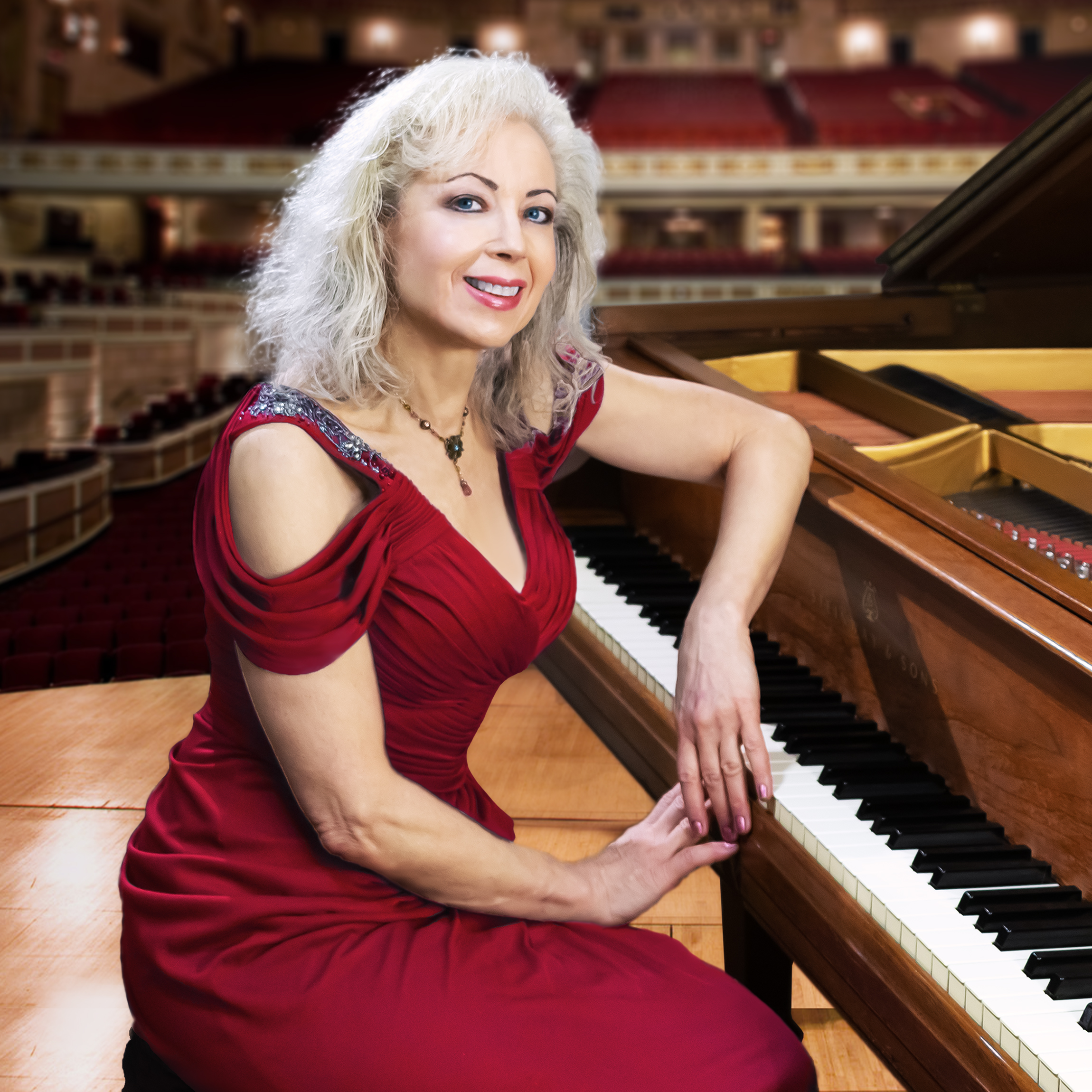
- Agranovich in 2022

Background information
- Born: Chernivtsi, Ukrainian SSR, Soviet Union (now Ukraine)
- Occupations: Classical Concert Pianist, Recording Artist, Music Educator, Artistic Director
- Instrument: Piano
- Labels: Romeo, RJ Productions International, Centaur
- Website: sophiagranovich.com

Sophia Agranovich (Note: Ukrainian: Софія Агранович, romanized: Sofiia Ahranovych) is a Ukrainian-born American classical concert pianist, recording artist, music educator, producer and artistic director. She holds Bachelor and Master degrees from the Juilliard School, where she studied on full scholarship with Sascha Gorodnitzki and Nadia Reisenberg, and taught piano as a teaching fellow. She continued her doctoral studies at Teachers College, Columbia University. Her live performances and discography have won top international awards and critical acclaim. Her albums are charting in top 10 across all musical genres on One World Music Radio and on World Top Radio Airplay Charts. A Steinway Artist, she is concertizing at major venues worldwide, and has been described by Fanfare Magazine as "a bold, daring pianist in the tradition of the Golden Age Romantics" and praised by the American Record Guide for her "magnificent shading and superior musicianship."

== Biography ==
=== Early life and music education ===
Sophia Agranovich was born in Chernivtsi, Ukrainian SSR, Soviet Union (modern-day Ukraine). Her father was a dentist and her mother was an instructor of the English language and her first piano teacher. Agranovich began formal piano lessons at age five. At six she was accepted to Chernivtsi School of Music and gave her first public concert. Her teachers were Anna Stolyarevich and Alexander Edelmann (both peers of Vladimir Horowitz and disciples of Felix Blumenfeld and Heinrich Neuhaus). At age 10 Agranovich won the Ukrainian Young Artists Competition (now known as the Mykola Lysenko International Music Competition), as that year's youngest participant. Her concerts were broadcast on national TV and radio stations.

Agranovich graduated from Chernivtsi School of Music in 1971. After immigrating with her family to the United States at age 15, Agranovich entered The Juilliard School Pre-College in New York City on a full scholarship in the class of Professor Sascha Gorodnitzki. Agranovich also studied with Nadia Reisenberg. She graduated from Juilliard with a Bachelor of Music degree in 1977 and a Master of Music degree in 1978. Agranovich won the Bergen Philharmonic Competition in 1979. She was awarded a fellowship and taught piano minor at Juilliard. Agranovich continued her academic pursuits at Teachers College, Columbia University, taking Doctor of Philosophy coursework in Music Education, Music Theory and Music History from 1980 to 1981.

=== Hiatus from music ===
Agranovich paused her musical career in the 1980s to raise a family and to pursue an additional career in Information Technology. Having earned a certification in Computer Science from the Empire Technical School in New York City in 1981, her career in technology developed with her employment as a systems analyst for the Metropolitan Life Insurance Company in 1985 (where she received the Presidential Quality Award for Computer Systems Design and Support), and later a senior programmer/analyst at Merrill in 1987. She was ultimately promoted to project manager/assistant vice president in 1995 and vice president in 2001.

In 2008, Agranovich retired from her IT career and studied naturopathy, traditional Indian medicine and traditional Chinese medicine. In 2008 she received certifications from National Exercise and Sports Trainers Association/Spencer Institute and American Association of Drugless Practitioners in Yoga, Pilates, and other holistic disciplines. From 2009 to 2012 she taught Yoga and Pilates.

=== Music career ===
In 2008, Agranovich restarted her professional musical career as a concert pianist, recording artist, music educator and program director. She regularly performs in numerous concerts both in the United States and internationally. In 2017 she gave 2-hour solo recitals at the Pennautier Festival and Juan-les-Pins in France where she premiered Quatre préludes en hommage a Chopin, Op. 162 dedicated to her by the French composer Françoise Choveaux. Other premieres included Roger Stubblefield's Sonata for clarinet and piano and Nocturne for viola and piano. Other major festivals she had participated at is Les Arts George V in Paris, Festival Musicale delle Nazioni in Rome, and Aspen in USA. Some of the venues she performed at are David Geffen (former Avery Fisher) Hall, Bruno Walter Auditorium and Paul Hall at Lincoln Center, Carnegie Weill Recital Hall, Merkin Concert Hall, Roerich and Metropolitan museums, Bargemusic, Tenri Cultural Institute, Polish Cultural Foundation, Lambert Castle, Watchung Arts Center, Sieminski Theater, Hunter Hall, Madison Arts Center, Salle Cortot, American Cathedral in Paris, 1901 Arts Club, Regent Hall, Biblioteca Musical Víctor Espinós, Teatro di Marcello, Sala Baldini, Mozarthaus, Ehrbarsaal, Théâtre Na Loba, Gesellschaft für Musiktheater at Palais Khevenhüller, and Kaiser Hall.

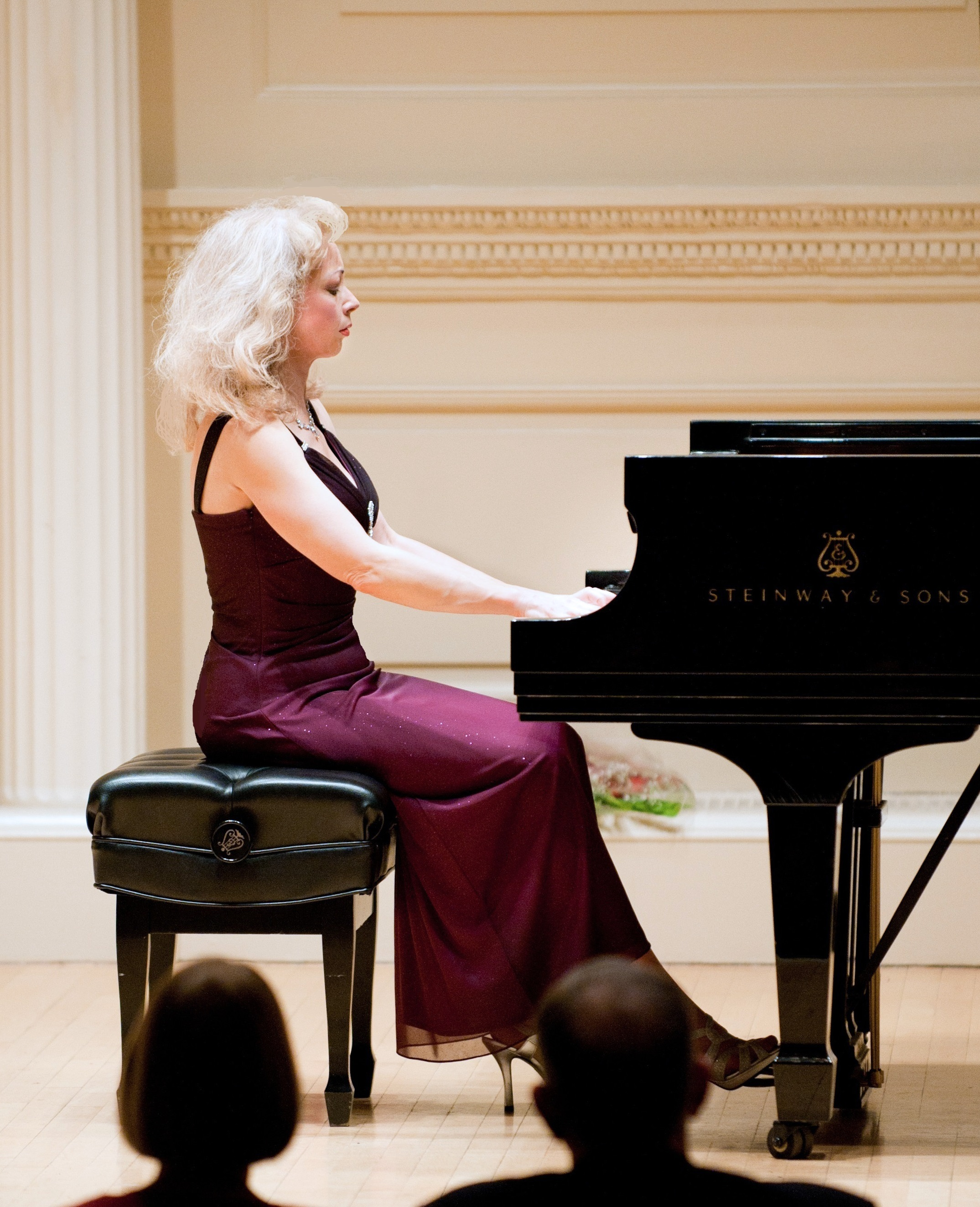
Agranovich in solo concert at Carnegie Hall on 5 November 2011

Other performance venues include numerous colleges and universities, such as the New Jersey Institute of Technology, Drew University, Princeton Univercity, Rubin Academy of Music, Ukrainian National Tchaikovsky Academy of Music and Lviv State Conservatory. She has collaborated with Mark Peskanov, Shlomo Mintz, Christopher Collins Lee, Andrew Litton, Alexander Mishnaevski, Gregory Singer, Brett Deubner, Andrew Lamy, Andatole Wieck, Rupam Sarmah, Lili Haydn, Hamid Saeidi, Kathleen Supové, award-winning Emmy, Grammy, and Billboard top ten musical artists, and members of the major orchestras.

Agranovich co-produced and released twelve albums from 2010, including eight on Centaur Records, consisting primarily of virtuoso piano repertoire of the Romantic era. She is an author of her albums' critically acclaimed liner notes, referred to as "detailed and well-written" and "enlightening and insightful". She has also performed in and co-produced several multi-instrumental singles that blend elements of classical, folk, Middle Eastern, Indian, New Age, and global fusion music, crossing traditional genre boundaries.

Her performances are broadcast in Brazil on Universidade FM 106.9, "Company of the Music", in Canada on CKWR "Women in Music," Berlin, Munich, Rome, New Zealand, London, Tokyo, Osaka, Southampton, Luxembourg, Portugal, Paris, Tel-Aviv, Switzerland, Taiwan, Canary Islands, and in New York area on WWFM "Between the Keys" with Jed Distler and "Piano Matters" with David Dubal, WMNR "Friday Evenings with Will Duchon", NPR WLPR-FM "Art on the Air", WQXR "Reflections from the Keyboard" with David Dubal, and live at WQXR Greene Space.

Sophia Agranovich is on the Steinway Artists roster, and is listed annually in Marquis Who's Who in America and Who's Who in the World. She has been featured in American Record Guide, Fanfare Magazine, New York Times, The Whole Note, Textura, AllMusic, Broadway World, World Culture Times, Musical America, FOX News, News ABC and other major media outlets. She is a voting member of NARAS, GrammyU mentor, and an active member of numerous professional music organizations, including American Liszt Society, College Music Society, and Leschetizky Association. Additionally she served on the board of NJMTA affiliated with Music Teachers National Association, and is an Artistic Director of "Classicals at the Circle" music series at the Watchung Arts Center. and a program chair and board member of Music Educators Association of New Jersey.

=== Pedagogy ===
Sophia Agranovich is a music educator and has received numerous pedagogy awards. She conducts master classes and lectures, adjudicates competitions, prepares students for exams and auditions, coaches professional musicians, and maintains a private teaching studio.

Agranovich's students have won various awards and had been accepted to notable music schools, including the Juilliard School, Mannes School of Music, Manhattan School of Music, Brown University, Northwestern University and New York University, among others. Her students have performed at the Carnegie Weill Recital Hall, Kennedy Center for the Performing Arts, Merkin Hall, Alice Tully Hall, Lincoln Center, Kimmel Center, Tenri Cultural Institute, Steinway Hall, Watchung Arts Center, Polish Cultural Foundation, and Polish Embassy in New York. They also played in England, Italy, France, Austria, Poland, China and at various colleges, universities and libraries. Their performances were broadcast on radio and TV, including WWFM "Kids on Keys" with Jed Distler and WQXR "Young Artists Showcase" with Robert Sherman.

== Awards and honors ==
- 2026: European Classical Music Awards – Platinum Prize in Piano, Artist of the Month, and Highest Score
- 2026: UK International Music Competition – Grand Prize
- 2026: European International Music Awards – 2 Gold medals in Best Classical Instrumental Solo and Best Classical Instrumentalist category
- 2026: Global Music Awards – Silver medal for Outstanding Achievement, Piano Album
- 2026: The Radio Music Awards – Best Classical Recording, Best Instrumental Recording
- 2025: World Entertainment Awards – Best Classical Solo
- 2025: World Classical Music Awards – Diamond Prize, Romantic Category; Platinum Prize, Etude Category; Artist Award
- 2025: Beethoven International Competition – Master Prize and Best Beethoven Performance Award
- 2025: The Radio Music Awards – Best Classical Artist, Best Classical Recording
- 2025: Claude Debussy International Music Competition – Diamond Prize and the Best Debussy Performance Special Award
- 2025: Global Music Awards – Silver Medal for Outstanding Achievement
- 2025: Schubert International Music Competition – Diamond Prize and Best Schubert Performance
- 2024: InterContinental Music Awards – Best Instrumentalist
- 2024: One Earth Awards – Gold Winner: Best Classical Music Recording, Best World Music
- 2024: World Entertainment Awards – Best Classical Artist
- 2024: Clouzine International Music Awards – Best Classical Piano Performance, Spring 2024
- 2024: Clouzine International Music Awards – Best Classical Piano Album, Spring 2024
- 2024: Global Music Awards – 3 Silver Medals for Outstanding Achievement
- 2024: LIT International Music Awards – Platinum Winner in 5 categories and overall Instrumental Category winner
- 2024: The Radio Music Awards – Best Classical Artist, Best Classical Recording
- 2023: The American Prize – 1st Place Winner of the Piano Performance Solo
- 2023: Steinway & Sons – Steinway Top Teacher Award
- 2023: InterContinental Music Awards – Best Instrumentalist
- 2023: Indie Music Channel – Best Classical Recording; Induction to The Indie Music Hall of Fame 2023
- 2023: The Radio Music Awards – Best Classical Artist, Best Classical Recording
- 2023: One Earth Awards – Gold Winner: Best Classical Music Recording, Best Contemporary Instrumental Single
- 2023: Clouzine International Music Awards – Best Instrumental Song, Fall 2023
- 2023: Global Music Awards – 2 Silver Medals for Outstanding Achievement, "Peace and Joy"
- 2023: Global Music Awards – 2 Silver Medals for Outstanding Achievement, "Love Serenade"
- 2023: LIT International Music Awards, Fall 2023 – Platinum: Best Classical Pianist, Best Classical Music, Best Instrumental Music
- 2023: Intercontinental Music Awards – 3-time Finalist
- 2023: One World Music Radio – Nominated for the Best Classical Album 2022 and Best Neo Classical Single
- 2022: Indie Music Channel – Winner, Best Classical Recording
- 2022: Fanfare Magazine – The 2022 Want List (Best Recordings)
- 2022: The Radio Music Awards – Best Classical Artist, Best Classical Recording, Best Instrumental Recording
- 2022: Clouzine International Music Awards – Best Classical Album, Fall 2022
- 2022: Global Music Awards – 2 Silver Medals for Outstanding Achievement
- 2022: LIT International Music Awards, Fall 2022 – Platinum: Best Female Artist and Best Classical Music; Gold: Best Instrumental Music and Best Performance; overall Instrumental Category winner
- 2022: LIT International Talent Awards, Spring 2022 – Platinum: Best Classical Pianist and Best Instrumental Artist; Gold: Best Female Instrumental Artist; Instrumentalist of the Year
- 2022: One World Music Radio – Best Classical Album 2021
- 2022: The American Prize – Winner, Piano Solo, 2nd place; Finalist, Virtual Performance
- 2022: Nomination for the Best Classical Recording and Album of the Year, Indie Music Channel
- 2021: World Top Radio Airplay Charts – July 2021 – December 2021
- 2021: Global Music Awards – 2 Silver Medals for Outstanding Achievement
- 2021: Clouzine International Music Awards – 2 Best Classical Albums (Spring and Fall 2021)
- 2019: Marquis Who's Who – Top Music Educator and Top Professional Awards
- 2018: Indie Music Channel – Indie Music Hall of Fame
- 2018: Global Music Awards – 2 Silver Medals for Outstanding Achievement
- 2018: Clouzine International Music Awards – Best Classical Piano Album (Spring 2018)
- 2018: The Radio Music Awards – Best Classical Female Artist
- 2018: Mainly Piano, 2018 Favorites and Picks – Chopin and Liszt: Piano Works
- 2017: Marquis Who's Who – Albert Nelson Marquis Lifetime Achievement Award
- 2017: Global Music Award – 3 Gold Medals: Classical Piano Solo, New Release, Album
- 2017: Global Music Awards – Top 10 albums across all the genres
- 2016: The American Prize – Finalist
- 2016: Prestige Music Awards – 2 Gold Medals
- 2016: Global Music Awards – 5 Silver Medals for Outstanding Achievement
- 2012: Steinway Artist Roster
- 1986: Metropolitan Life Insurance – Presidential Quality Award for Computer Systems Design and Support
- 1980: Juilliard School – Teaching Fellowship
- 1979: Bergen Philharmonic Competition – 1st Place Winner, Piano
- 1966: Ukrainian Young Artists Competition (now known as Mykola Lysenko International Music Competition) – 1st Place Winner, Piano

== Discography ==
Year	Album	Label
2010	"Romantic Virtuoso Masterpieces" (Beethoven: Sonata No. 21 in C Major 'Waldstein'; works by Chopin, Liszt, Schumann, Scriabin)	Armonioso / CDBaby
2012	"Franz Liszt – Bicentennial Tribute" (Liszt: Etudes 'Un Sospiro' and 'La Campanella'; Rhapsodie Espagnole; Sonata in b minor)	Armonioso / CDBaby
2014	"Passion and Fantasy" (Beethoven: Sonata in f minor 'Appassionata'; Chopin: Fantaisie in F minor; Sonata in b minor)	Romeo Records / Albany
2014	"Brahms, Schumann and Liszt: Piano Works" (Brahms-Paganini Variations – complete books I and II; Schumann: Symphonic Etudes; Schumann-Liszt: Liebeslied 'Widmung')	Centaur Records / Naxos
2015	Schubert: 'Wanderer' Fantasie; Chopin: 4 Ballades (complete)	Centaur Records / Naxos
2016	"Robert Schumann: Carnaval and Fantasie" (Carnaval, Op.9; Fantasie in C major, Op. 17)	Centaur Records / Naxos
2018	"Chopin and Liszt: Piano Works" (Chopin: Polonaise-Fantaisie, Nocturne Op. 48 No.1; Liszt: 3 Sonnetti del Petrarca (complete); 'Dante' Sonata; Hungarian Rhapsody No. 14)	Centaur Records / Naxos
2020	"In Celebration of 210th Anniversary of Chopin": Sonata in b-flat Minor; 4 Scherzi (complete); Polonaise 'Héroïque'	Centaur Records / Naxos
2021	"In Celebration of 250th Anniversary of Beethoven": Fantasie Op. 77; Sonatas 'Pathétique', 'Moonlight', 'Tempest'	Centaur Records / Naxos
2022	"Franz Liszt: Rhapsodies, Études and Transcriptions": Hungarian Rhapsodies Nos. 6 and 13; Schubert/Liszt "Ständchen (Serenade)," "Erlkönig (Elf King)," "Die Forelle (The Trout)"; Transcendental Etudes No. 9 "Ricordanza" and No. 4 "Mazeppa"	Centaur Records / Naxos
2022	"Peace and Joy (Mendelssohn/Mozart World)" – single with Rupam Sarmah; also included in the album ARISE TOGETHER	RJ Productions International, One Little Finger Global Foundation
2023	"Love Serenade" – single with Rupam Sarmah; feat. Lili Haydn and Hamid Saeidi	RJ Productions International, One Little Finger Global Foundation
2023	"Album Leaf: Piano Works by Felix Mendelssohn": Fantasie in F-sharp minor (Sonate ecossaise), Albumblatt in A minor, Caprice in A minor, Variations sérieuses, complete Etudes, Rondo capriccioso in E minor/E Major	Centaur Records / Naxos
2025	David Fogel: Symphonina No. 3 "Four Days in the Life of the Princess" , Movement 3 "The Masquerade Ball" (pianist Sophia Agranovich)	TuneCore
2026	"A Reverie of the Soul: Piano Works by Robert Schumann": Sonata in No. 2 in G minor, Op. 22; Symphonic Études (Études Symphoniques), Op. 13; Arabeske in C Major, Op. 18; Papillons, Op. 2	Centaur Records / Naxos

== Interviews and discussions ==
- Fanfare Magazine – Interview, May–June 2026
- "Sophia Agranovich Classical Virtuoso speaks about her new album and upcoming world tour" – Livestream Interview with Rob Mullins, 20 April 2026
- Podcast Interview by David Fogel, CEO of the Symphonina Foundation – 2 August 2026
- Podcast Interview by David Fogel, CEO of the Symphonina Foundation – 27 March 2025
- "Virtuoso Reimagined: A Journey of Reinvention" – interview on PianoPod YouTube livestream; audio on Spotify, IHeartRadio, Audible, Pandora, Apple and Amazon Music – 17 December 2024
- Lazie Indie Music Magazine, Inaugural Classical Musicians Edition – Interview, September 2024
- Bold Journey Magazine – Interview, June 2024
- "What Makes You Stronger!" – Lite Lounge with Dimitri K. – 25 February 2024 – Interview
- Fanfare Magazine – Interview, January–February 2023
- "Mixing It with Nicki Kris"- podcast discussion and performance, November 2023
- Interview "Music I Am" with Aaron Larget-Caplan – 3 October 2023
- Interview by Kabir Sehgal at 7-Point Sundays – 15 March 2023
- WWFM Classical Network, WWPJ, WWNJ, WWCJ "Cadenza" with David Osenbeg, 17 February 2023
- NPR Lakeshore Public Radio, "Art on the Air" – Interview, January 2023
- Fanfare Magazine – Interview, November–December 2022
- "Mixing It with Nicki Kris"- podcast discussion and performance, October 2022
- The Ark of Music – Interview, September 2022
- "Chatting with Nat" podcast with Natalie Jean on SIM radio network – discussion and performance, September 2022
- "Content vs. Quantity!" – Lite Lounge with Dimitri K. – 21 August 2022 – Interview and Album Show
- "Mixing It with Nicki Kris"- podcast discussion and performance, April 2022
- "Music Matters" – "Concert Pianist on Maintaining Inspiration" Live with Maestro Jason Tramm – discussion and performance, October 2021
- "Chatting with Nat" podcast with Natalie Jean on SIM radio network- discussion and performance – September 2021
- One World Music Radio – "Artist in Profile" interview, July 2021; discussion and performance
- Mainly Piano – interview; July 2021
- Fanfare Magazine – Interview; March–April 2021
- Radio Fantastica – discussion and performance; February 2021
- Video Interview with Maestro Daniel Kepl; January 2019
- Fanfare Magazine – Interview; July–August 2018
- Fanfare Magazine – Interview; May–June 2017
- Fanfare Magazine – Interview; March–April 2015
- Fanfare Magazine – Interview; November–December 2012
- Fanfare Magazine – Interview; March–April 2012

== Reviews ==
- American Record Guide – reviews in the issues March–April 2021 P. 45-46, November–December 2012 P. 152, July–August 2014 P. 80-81, July–August 2015, March–April 2016, March–April 2017, July–August 2021, March–April 2024 P. 73, June–July 2026 (PDF, fee required)
- The Whole Note: 1 November – 13 December 2022, Vol. 28, issue 2, P. 53-54; February–March 2024 Volume 29, Issue 4
- Mainly Piano – November 2018, October 2020, February 2021, August 2022, 9 September 2022, 1 November 2023 22 September 2025, March 2026
- AllMusic – July 2026
- Textura – August 2026
- Take Effect Reviews – August 2026
- Artisan Music Reviews – March 2024
- The JWVibe – September 2024, September 2025, May 2026
- One World Music Radio – 2021, 2022, 2023, 2024, 2026
- The Ark of Music – 13 September 2022 and 21 September 2022, August 2023
- Art Music Lounge – March 2016, October 2016, January 2021, August 2023
- Clouzine Magazine – Fall 2018, Spring 2021 – P.14, Fall 2021, Fall 2024
- Contemporary Fusion Reviews – September 2022
- Atlanta Audio Club – May 2018, December 2020
- Performing Arts Review – January 2017 – video review
- LaDepeche, France – August 2017
- L'Independant, France – July 2017
- Audiophile Audition – April 2014
- Fanfare Magazine – all the review articles for Sophia Agranovich
