= Rupam Sarmah =

- Born: Jorhat, Assam, India
- Genres: World, New Age, Classical, folk
- Occupations: Computer Scientist, Composer, Filmmaker, Record Producer, Engineer
- Instruments: Vocals, tabla, percussions, strings, keyboard, piano
- Years active: 1992–present
- Label: RJ Productions International
- Website: www.rupamsarmah.net

Rupam Sarmah is an Indian-born musician, filmmaker, entrepreneur, author, sound engineer, and computer scientist. Rupam is a Guinness World Records holder and had a #1 release on the Billboard World Music chart (Together in Peace, 2017). He won Gold Telly Awards (One Little Finger, 2019). As a filmmaker, Sarmah has directed documentaries, short films, and feature films. Sarmah directed the English-language feature film One Little Finger with a theme of Ability in Disability.

== Work ==
Sarmah has worked with some of the award-winning artists and actors -- Siedah Garrett, Dan Aykroyd, Moloya Goswami, Tamela D'Amico, Abhinaya, Jaya Seal, Kushol Chakravarty, Asim Bose, Pabitra Rabha, Rituparna Sengupta, Debashree Roy, Paoli Dam, and others.

Rupam has produced, engineered, and recorded songs and music with award-winning artists such as Quincy Jones, Siedah Garrett, Kathy Sledge, Julian Lennon, Janis Ian, Kechi Okwuchi, Pandit Vishwa Mohan Bhatt, Laura Sullivan, George Kahumoku, Jr., Cindy Paulos, Wouter Kellerman, Brian Vibberts, Ricky Kej, Sumitra Guha, Kevin Mackie, Sophia Agranovich, Alan Roy Scott, Udit Narayan, Babul Supriyo, Sadhna Sargam, Kumar Sanu, Rupankar, Subhamita, Swagatalakshmi Dasgupta, Usha Uthup, Anweshaa, Iman Chakraborty, and many others.

Sarmah and Sumitra Guha have represented India for Festival of India concerts in France (2018) organized by the Ministry of Culture, Govt. of India, and the Embassy of India in Paris on the occasion of India's 70th Independence. The theme of the project was A Musical Journey towards Rising India.

As a Computer Engineer, Executive, and media professional, Rupam has worked for technology startups and other companies, including Apple. Dr. Sarmah worked in the White House (non-political | Senior Advisor) during the Biden Administration. Rupam has been a Voting member of the Grammy® as a Musician, Producer, and Engineer (P&E) since 2005. [3]

Sarmah has been involved with AI, Autism, and Music research and started a research center (RMAN) for ongoing research.

== Activism ==
Sarmah founded the One Little Finger Global Foundation (501c3) to support underprivileged children and persons with disabilities, media production house RJ Productions International for collaborative content creation. He has worked on several projects with organizations, including UNESCO Center for Peace, PRERONA, Manovikas - Welfare and Rehabilitation Center for the Children with Special Needs, Bhupen Hazarika Foundation.

== Awards ==
Sarmah made a Guinness World Record on 24 February 2013 for his project 'A Musical Journey for World Peace', which united more than 500 participants from across the globe playing 315 kinds of musical instruments for world peace.

Sarmah has received numerous awards and recognitions for his music and film. One Little Finger, written and directed by Sarmah, received several awards. His research-based world music project, OMKARA - The Sound of Divine Love and Gospel with BorgeetTalk to God received nominations at the Hollywood Music in Media Awards 2014.

== Chart performance ==
The album A Musical Journey: Together in Peace made the top 10 on the Billboard World Albums chart. Sarmah created history by becoming the first Assamese and also probably the first artist of Northeast origin to get a #1 album on the Billboard World Albums chart.

OMKARA was listed in the top 10 Radio Airplay chart.

Action Moves People United, co-produced and engineered by Sarmah, made the top 10 on the US Billboard Compilation Album chart.

== Life ==
Sarmah was born in Jorhat, Assam. He learned Indian instruments and classical vocal music during his time in Golaghat and Jorhat. He also continued to explore other fields, such as film, sound engineering, and music. Sarmah migrated to the United States after completing his BS in Engineering in India. He then earned his doctorate from George Washington University's School of Engineering and Applied Science with a dissertation in Artificial Intelligence. Rupam completed his Master's in Management, Master's in Computer Science, and Doctorate from US universities. In the US, he took lessons from Ali Akbar Khan, Hindustani classical maestro.

== Filmography ==
1. Rupam Live [2026]
2. Old Man River - Bistirno Parore - Video Produced and Directed by Rupam Sarmah [2025]
3. ARISE TOGETHER- Video - I Am Brave by Dana | Gandhi's Grandson Speech (Album Produced and Directed by Rupam Sarmah) [2022, Sep 23]
4. AUM - Blessings to Humanity - Music Video (track from AUM - The Divine Sound; Music Directed and Produced by Rupam Sarmah) [2021, Sep 24]
5. Enlighten Your Soul | Tribute to Gandhi, Mandela, MLK Jr. - Music Video (Music Directed and Produced by Rupam Sarmah [Oct 2, 2021]
6. One Little Finger (2019-2020) - Feature Film - Story, Screenplay and Direction by Sarmah
7. Gumsum Gumsum - Music Video (Singers: Anweshaa, Rupam; Music and Direction by Rupam Sarmah) [2020]
8. O Mor Axomi Aai (Love for my country) - Music Video (Singer, Songwriter, Direction by Rupam Sarmah) [2020]
9. O Maa Desh Amar (Singer: Iman Chakraborty, Music: Rupam Sarmah, Bengali Lyrics: Gautam Susmit) [2020]
10. Gulsher Music Video (produced by Rupam Sarmah and Sharif Awan)
11. Together in Peace - Mandela Meets Gandhi (produced by Rupam Sarmah and Sharon Katz)
12. We Are Love (900 Voices) - Music Video: Participated in Grammy® winning composer Laura Sullivan’s project [2015]
13. In Search of God - Film Director (Best Documentary Award, Indian Film Festival, Houston, Texas; Music Score, composer, Sound Design)
14. Sagar Kinare (Bengali) - Music Director
15. Alor Thikana (Bengali) - Music Director
16. A Musical Journey for World Peace - A Musical Concert Film, Directed by Rupam
17. Majestic Assam - Music Video
18. Story of Gulsher - Music Video
19. Art of Healing - Documentary, produced by Rupam (portrait of an artist, Lisa Sniderman)

== Discography ==
1. Arise Together - Songs to Inspire - Co-Produced and Engineered by Rupam Sarmah [2025]
2. Old Man River - Bistirno Parore - Produced and Performed by Rupam Sarmah [2025]
3. Arise Together - Children of the World - Co-Produced and Engineered by Rupam Sarmah [2023]
4. Love Serenade - Rupam Sarmah, Sophia Agranovich [2023]
5. ARISE TOGETHER - Co-Produced and Engineered by Rupam Sarmah [2022]
6. Peace and Joy - Rupam Sarmah and Sophia Agranovich [2022]
7. AUM - The Divine Sound - Composed and Directed by Rupam Sarmah [2021]
8. AUM - ALOHA Blessings - Composed and Directed by Rupam Sarmah, feat. George Kahumoku, Jr., Cindy Paulos [2021]
9. One Little Finger (2019) - Rupam Sarmah featuring Quincy Jones, Siedah Garrett, Julian Lennon, Kechi Okwuchi, Vishwa Mohan Bhatt
10. A Musical Journey towards Rising India (2018) - Produced by Padmashri Sumitra Guha and Rupam Sarmah; Music Direction by Rupam Sarmah
11. A Musical Journey: Together in Peace (2017) - album composed, directed, produced by Sarmah
12. The Song Unsung (2016) - vocals by Janis Ian and Sarmah (words by Tagore, music inspired by Borgeet 'Pawe Pori Hori')
13. Story of Gulsher (2016) - a collaboration between India and Pakistan produced and composed by Sarmah
14. Mandela Meets Gandhi (2016) - a collaboration with Sharon Katz and The Peace Train (South Africa)
15. Action Moves People United (September 2016) - album with Dan Aykroyd, Kathy Sledge, Julian Lennon, Alan White, Annie Haslam, Lillias White, and others (Sarmah as Co-Producer, Singer, Composer, Engineer)
  1. includes "Enlighten Your Soul" (2016) - with Dan Aykroyd, Alan White and others (composed by Sarmah)
16. Arise Above Abuse (Spoken Word and Music Album by Cindy Paulos and others) [2015]
17. Sounds from the Circle - New Age Album - compilation [2015]
18. OMKARA – The Sound of Divine Love (World Music Project based on Chakra and healing music) – Directed and Produced by Rupam (feat. Pandit Vishwa Mohan Bhatt, Sumitra Guha, Laura Sullivan, and others) [2014]
19. Talk to God (Contemporary Gospel song blended with Borgeet 'gopale ki goti'), Rupam Sarmah and Nona Brown, Singer and Composer [2014]
20. Angel Blessings (Benefiting Hospice): Take in a Deep Breath of Heaven (Rupam Sarmah and Nona Brown) [2014]
21. In Search of God - Singer, Direction and Score
22. Sagar Kinare (Bengali) - Singer and Music Director
23. Hits of Rupam - Singer and composer
24. Priyam (Assamese) - Singer and composer
25. Gems of Bishnu Rabha, vol 1, 2, 3 (iTunes) - Sound Design
26. Geetali (Assamese) - Singer and composer
27. Piya Re (Hindi) - Singer and composer
28. Praner Gaan - Singer and Composer
29. Sylvan Rhapsody of Assam (iTunes) - Sound Design
30. Sangeetpremee - Singer and composer
31. My Love Is You - Singer and composer
32. Music Film (world record concert) – A Musical Journey for World Peace by Rupam and his team
33. Bengali Album (Banjara)
34. Bishnuprasadar Prosad (book – published) (assisted Dilip K. Datta, URI, USA)
35. Bhupen Hazarikar Geet aru Jeevan Roth – (assisted Dilip K. Datta, URI, USA), published 2014
