= Koza-dereza =

Ukrainian children's opera composed by Mykola Lysenko

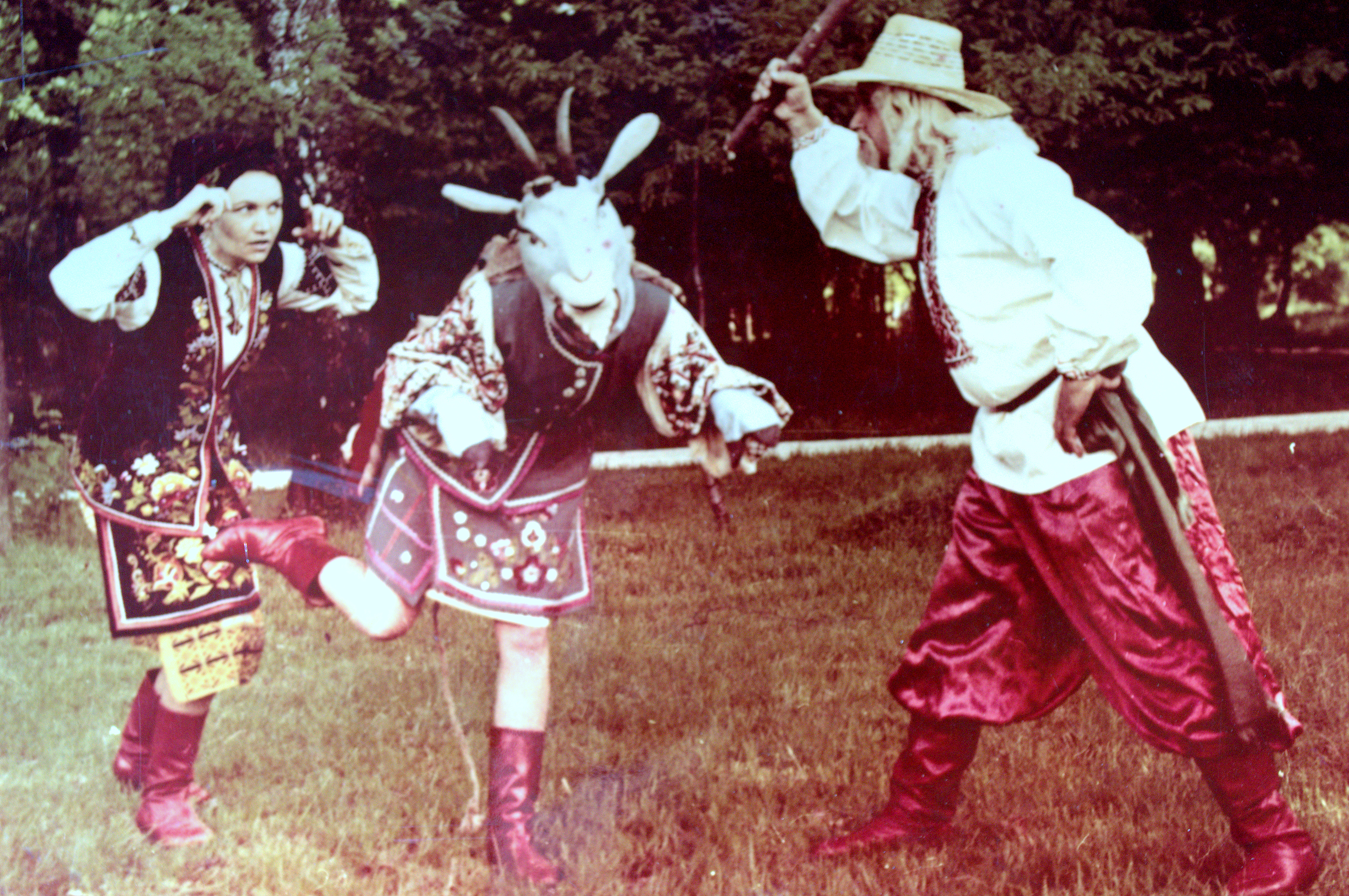
Actors performing Koza-Dereza

Koza-dereza (Ukrainian: «Коза-дереза») is a children's opera in one act by the Ukrainian composer Mykola Lysenko written in 1888 and first performed in 1890 in Lysenko's home in Kyiv.

== Synopsis ==
The original story begins with an old man, his wife, his sons, and a mischievous goat. The goat causes division between the man and his family. By the time the old man realized the goat's manipulations, it is too late. No longer with the man and his family, the goat proceeds to take over a rabbit's house. Many animals then try to convince the goat to leave.

== Significance ==
Lysenko's works including Koza-dereza became a foundational part of Ukrainian musical culture. Though he had studied with famed composer Nikolai Rimsky-Korsakov, Ukraine-themed compositions impeded Lysenko's career and led him to sever his relationship with the Russian Imperial Music Society.

Koza-dereza is based on the Ukrainian fairy tale, Bully Goat (Koza dereza). It was one of three children's operas that Mykola Lysenko composed which also include the 1891 Pan Kots’kyi (Sir Catsky), and the 1892 Winter and Spring.

Members of the Toronto Dance Theater performed the libretto on film.

== See also ==
- Bully Goat (fairy tale)
- Ukrainian fairy tale

== General references ==
- Н. Андрієвська. Дитячі опери Лисенка. Київ, 1962. – 76с.
- KALINA, Petr Ch. Lysenko, Mykola Vitalijovyč [online]. Brno: Ústav hudební vědy Filozofické fakulty Masarykovy univerzity, rev. 2009-01-08 [cit. 2014-03-15]. Dostupné online. (česky)
- СУЛІМ, Р. А. Дитячі опери Миколи Лисенка та їх сцєнічна доля. Часопис Національної музичної академії України (online) 2012, No. 4, čís. 2(15), с. 102.
- ŠALPLACHTOVÁ, Zuzana. Dětské opery Mykoly Lysenka. Brno, 2012 [cit. 2014-03-22]. 53 s. Bakalářská diplomová práce. Masarykova univerzita, Filozofická fakulta. Vedoucí práce Petr Kalina. s. 38.
