= Sumitra Guha =

Indian classical singer

PS Vidushi Sumitra Guha
- సుమిత్రా గుహ/ সুমিত্রা গুহ
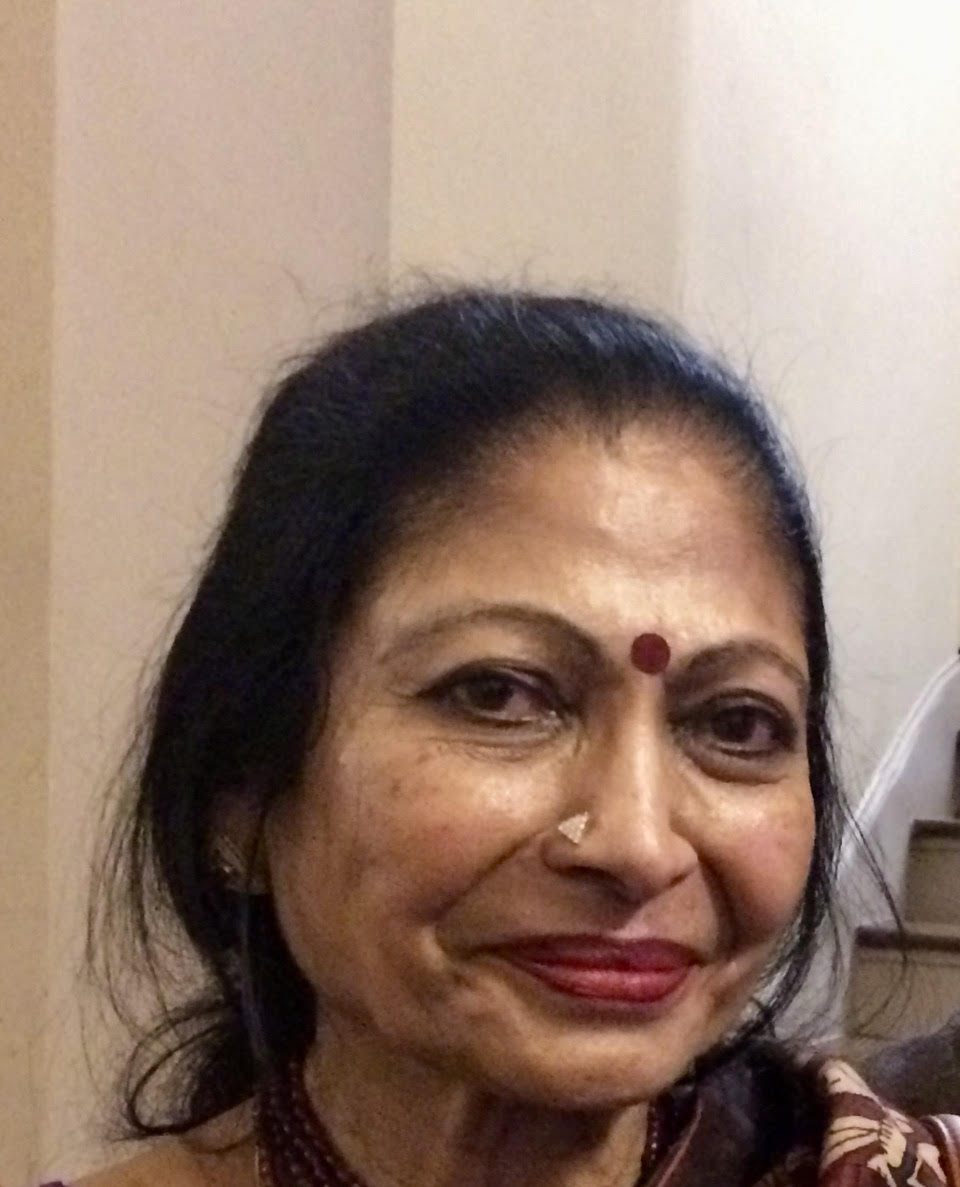
- Guha on the occasion of Indian Republic Day celebrations in Paris, 2018.
- Born: Sumitra Raju; 21 January; Andhra Pradesh, India
- Education: Visva-Bharati University, (B.A., M.A.)
- Years active: 1972–present
- Spouse: Pran Kumar Guha
- Parents: R. G. Narayana Raju (father); Rajyalakshmi Raju (mother)
- Relatives: Shobha Raju(sister), Sreyash Sarkar(grand-nephew), Phulrenu Guha(grand aunt-in-law)
- Awards: Padma Shri
- Musical career
- Genres: Hindustani Classical Music, Carnatic Music, World Music, Kirana Gharana
- Occupation: Hindustani Classical Vocalist
- Instrument: Vocals
- Website: www.sumitraguha.in

Vidushi Sumitra Guha is an Indian classical vocalist, known for her expertise in the Carnatic and Hindustani schools of classical music. The Government of India honored her in 2010, with the fourth highest civilian award of Padma Shri and in 2020 with a Sangeet Natak Akademi award.

== Biography ==
Sumitra Guha, née Raju, was born in Andhra Pradesh to a locally known singer, Smt. Rajyalakshmi Raju and R. G. Narayana Raju, a retired Deputy Collector, a native of Tirumala Reddypalle, Chitoor Dist. Her sister is the noted Carnatic vocalist and exponent of the sankirtana of gospel of the 15th-century saint-composer, Annamacharya, Smt. Shobha Raju and her grandnephew, is applied physicist and multi-disciplinary artist, Sreyash Sarkar. Guha took to music at an early age, receiving the first lessons in music from her mother. Her formal education in music started at the age of eleven from S. R. Janakiraman, a renowned music guru of Carnatic Classical Music. Having grown up in a small village of Andhra Pradesh, she wanted to become a doctor because of the nobility of the profession. Her father, having been transferred to Nepal, suggested that she join Visva-Bharati University, Shantiniketan. She carried on with her academic education, pursuing graduate studies in philosophy. She started learning Hindustani music in 1964 and continued her music studies under Pandit A. Kanan and Vidushi Malabika Kanan of Kirana Gharana, and later received some guidance from Sushil Kumar Bose, a renowned exponent of music who learned under the tutelage of Ustad Bade Ghulam Ali Khan of the Patiala Gharana, all in the culturally enriching atmosphere of Calcutta.

Guha continued her studies even after her marriage in a Bengali family at the age of 19, and in 1972, became a B-grade artist of the All India Radio. The same year, she debuted as a performer with her concert at Thirumala temple in Tirupati. At AIR, she got the opportunity to participate in four chain concerts of the station in 1982, 85, 89 and 90 and several Radio Sangeet Sammelans and national programmes for AIR and Doordarshan. By 1995, she got the title of Vidhushi. and the same year she became a Top Grade artist of the All India Radio.

Guha is proficient in Carnatic and Hindustani schools of music and is the first woman in Andhra Pradesh to sing Hindustani music, but she is more aligned to the latter with a known leaning towards the Kirana Gharana. The depth of the alaap, the slow elaboration of notes in the vistaar and the stability of swaras became her signature style, and she became one with the putative Gharana by infusing spirituality in her renditions, as substantiated by concerts in India and later on, abroad. Having been invited to and sponsored by various music foundations abroad, she has travelled widely, giving performances and holding workshops in the United States, Canada, Mauritius, West Asia, South-East Asia, Europe (including Russia, Algeria, Ukraine, France, Italy), Korea, Germany, Yugoslavia, Holland and the UK.

In his Khayal Vocalism: Continuity Within Change, Deepak Raja, the eminent musicologist writes about Guha's prowess as a classical musician:

Despite her early cultivation in the Carnatic tradition, her delivery of Hindustani Music bears no trace of the linguistic and stylistic barriers that divides India's south from the north. Her intonation of Hindustani melodies is authentic, and her diction in the enunciation of Hindi poetry, immaculate. The core of her music remains anchored to the melody-dominated music-making of the Kirana Gharana along with its architecture. In superficial aspects, however, her khayals exhibit, the influence of her brief Patiala exposure. Her musical mind has also acquired some tendencies not traceable to obvious influences. Guha has painstakingly absorbed two substantially different traditions and has mastered the subtleties of the various genres associated with each tradition. Her music exhibits a conviction, that comes from knowing precisely, what she is doing and why.

In 1995, the Central Production Centre of Doordarshan made a documentary called Ek Mulakat based on the life of Guha. She has also recorded for the Sangeet Natak Akademi and others such as MMY Music Foundation and His Master's Voice.

For the Sangeet Natak Academy and the national channels of AIR, Guha has recorded many performances. She has also sung fusion music with renowned musicians from abroad. Her performance at the India Habitat Centre, Delhi, in tandem with the double Grammy Award winner, Robin Hogarth, based on Sant Kabir's music was a blend of Hindustani and African gospel music traditions. She has also done a music series by name, Tribute to the Musical Saints of India, was performed at various concerts in India. She has worked on a research-based music project by name, OMKARA - The Sound of Divine Love, Directed by Guinness World Record® holder Rupam Sarmah, Grammy award winner Pandit Vishwa Mohan Bhatt and others. Recently, she has introduced a new project "Musical Journey Towards Rising India". This project is in collaboration with internationally acclaimed Indian Classical musician Rupam Sarmah, Co-Producer, award-winning singer, songwriter & Guinness World Record® holder who is based in California. Guha and Rupam Sarmah have represented India for Festival of India concerts in France (2018) organized by Ministry of Culture, Govt. of India, and Embassy of India in Paris on the occasion of India's 70th Independence.

Guha founded the Sumadhur School of Performing Arts which continues to teach music in the traditional gurukula style. The primary purpose of such a system is the direct interaction between the Guru (teacher) and Shishya (disciple), a one-to-one association which forms a channel through which knowledge is imparted. This enables to create an environment and relationship between the guru and shishya.

== Awards and recognitions ==
Guha has received many awards and honors starting from the gold medals she received from the Tirumala Tirupati Devasthanam at Tirupati and from the All India Vaggeykar Utsavams at Bhadrachalam in 1972. West Bengal Journalists Association awarded her the Best Vocalist of the Year prize in 1991 and a year later, she received the title Vidushi, in 1995.

Many music and arts organizations have recognized her including but not limited to Sangeet Kala Ratna from the Sangeet Kala Kendra, Agra in 1997, Best Music Teacher award from the Sangam Kala Group at the National Music Awards 2006, Pt. Gama Maharaj Smriti Samman in 2006, Rashtra Bhushan Samman from the Vishwa Jagriti Mission in 2007, DTA Excellence Award from the Delhi Telugu Academy in 2008, Mahandhra Excellence Award from the Telugu Employers’ Welfare Association (Delhi), Face Award in 2009, Naadbrahm Shiromani from Sangeetanjali, Mumbai in 2010, Sangeet Vibhuti Samman from the Gandhi Hindustani Sahitya Sabha and Sangeet Shree Award from the Art and Cultural Trust of India, in 2011 etc.

Guha was bestowed with a Sangeet Natak Akademi award by India's national level academy for performing arts in 2020.

The Government of India included her in the 2010 Republic Day honours list for the fourth highest award of Padma Shri.

In 2026, Lokmat Sur Jyotsna National Music Award honoured her with an Icon Award for her 'versatile and remarkable contribution to Indian music'.

== Rave Reviews ==
1. A Rare Breed ...The Statesman
2. Andhra's gift to the nation ...The Statesman
3. Now, there's magic ...The Times of India
4. Sumitra Guha scaling new peaks ...The New Indian Express, Vijayawada
5. The ebb and flow of melody ...The Hindu
6. Soulful Soloist ...Metro Now
7. Sumitra sang like the cuckoo bird with its honeyed voice in Spring ...Vanitha Jyothi
8. Sumitra's instant victory of voice in Mauritius ...The Statesman
9. It was obvious from the opening German Concert in Saarbrücken that it was a very special tour. The audience was so entranced that they did not want to leave the blissful atmosphere created by the musicians ...Konzertburo Report, Wegberg, Germany
10. She unfolded the raga with the tender care one would bestow on unfurling the petals of a delicate flower awaiting full bloom ...The Hindustan times
11. She is not merely better. She is different ...The Times of India
12. Enthralled listeners with her technical prowess and devotional fervor ...The Hindu
13. She is not only a versatile singer but also a gifted composer ...The Hindu
14. Certainly, music has no barriers. The scintillating performance by Padma Shree Vidushi Sumitra Guha and Double Grammy Award Winner Robin Hogarth bore testament to the fact that when it comes to music language has no role to play ...The Times of India

== See also ==
- Carnatic music
- Hindustani music
- Kirana Gharana
