= Yuri Laniuk =

- Юрій Євгенович Ланюк
- Born: 7 June 1957 (age 69); Lviv
- Occupations: Composer; Cellist; Academic teacher
- Organizations: Lviv National Music Academy
- Title: Merited Artist of Ukraine
- Awards: Shevchenko National Prize; Decoration of Honor Meritorious for Polish Culture

Yuri Yevhenovych Laniuk (Ukrainian: Юрій Євгенович Ланюк, transcition: Yuriy Yevhenovych Lanyuk; born 7 June 1957) is a Ukrainian composer, cellist and academic teacher. His works, published in Switzerland, have been played internationally and recorded.

== Life and career ==
Laniuk was born in Lviv in 1957. He studied at the Lviv Conservatory, cello from 1995 to 1980 with Evgen Spitzer and composition from 1980 with Dezső Zádor. He also took cello lessons with Mstislav Rostropovich in 1972 and studied composition with Andrzej Nikodemowicz. From 1980 to 1982 he took postgraduate studies with Vadim Tschervov at the Kyiv Conservatory. Hw won the 1979 Mykola Lysenko International Music Competition in Kyiv. In 1982 he became lecturer, and later professor, at the department for strings and composition of the Lviv Music Academy. He has been a member of the National Union of Composers of Ukraine since 1987.

Besides playing concerts, composing and teaching, he is also on the jury of international cello and composition competitions such as the Mykola Lysenko International Music Competition (2002, 2007, 2012 and 2024 the Lutosławski composition competition in Warsaw (2005) and the cello competition (2011 and 2015), the Friedrich Dotzauer competition for young cellist in Dresden (2013), and the composition competition Sacrarium ("Sacred music in our time") in Lviv.

Laniuk's awards include the Levko Revutsky Prize of the Ukrainian Ministry of Culture (1990), the Lyatoshynsky state prize for composition (2001), the Shevchenko National Prize (2005), the title Merited Artist of Ukraine (2008) and the order of Honor Meritorious for Polish Culture of the Polish Ministry for Culture (2014).

Laniuk's works have been published by the Swiss Sordino Ediziuns Musicalas. A portrait CD was released in 1999 by the Polish lable Accord.

Laniuk after the world premiere of Elegie, 2026

His Elegie, subtitled Message to A. G., for large orchestra was premiered on 23 September 2026 by the Youth Symphony Orchestra of Ukraine, conducted by Oksana Lyniv, at the Casals Forum as part of the Kronberg Festival.

== Compositions ==
- Kammermusik for 21 instruments (1987)
- Die Dornenklage, cantata after Bohdan Ihor Antonych for soprano and chamber orchestra (1976, rev. 1991)
- Gesang zur Tagundnachtgleiche, after "Chant pour un équinoxe" by Saint-John Perse for soprano, baritone and chamber ensemble (1977, rev. 1991)
- Melancholischer Walzer, TV film score after a short story by Olha Kobylianska (1990)
- Vergessenes Land, after themes from novellas by Vasyl Stefanyk for soprano and orchestra (1992)
- Der Jäger Gracchus after Kafka's story for baritone and chamber orchestra (1993)
- Sonate of Expectations for cello, piano and four melodic voices (1993)
- TanGOpak for piano and percussion (1994)
  - TanGOpak, version for piano, percussion and strings (1996)
- Musique pour Recherche for nine instruments (1994–1996)
- Palimpseste after texts by Vasyl Stus and Biblical texts for solo violin, mixed choir and orchestra (1994, rev. 1998–1999)
- Music for the Remembrances, New Parables and Sermons – cantata to words of Nikanor Parra for soprano, baritone and symphony orchestra after texts by Nicanor Parra in Ukrainian translations by Bohdan Bojtschuk for soprano, baritone and orchestra (1997–2001, rev. 2012)
- Musik zum Stallbuch und Elegie für den leuchtenden Vogel for solo cello, piano and two string quartets (2000)
- „… вузли життя, немов вузли пташиних льотів“ after Bohdan Ihor Antonych for flute, oboe, viola, cello and piano (2001)
- Verkündigung for solo violin, mixed choir and string orchestra (2003)
- Lieder jenseits der Menschen, four songs after Paul Celan for mezzo-soprano, piano and strings (2004)
- Die klagende Mutter, oratorio after Pavlo Tytchyna (2008)
- Melodie for the trumpeters of the Lviv Town Hall (2011)
- Sonate for chamber ensemble (2012)
- A-cappella works after texts by Taras Shevchenko, Pavlo Tytchyna, Vasyl Barka a.o.
- Elegie (Message to A. G.) for large orchestra
