= WYIN =

Television station in Gary, Indiana

- Gary–Merrillville, Indiana; Chicago, Illinois; United States
- City: Gary, Indiana
- Channels: Digital: 17 (UHF); Virtual: 56
- Branding: Lakeshore PBS

Programming
- Affiliations: 56.1: PBS; 56.2: NHK World

Ownership
- Owner: Northwest Indiana Public Broadcasting, Inc.
- Sister stations: WLPR-FM

History
- First air date: November 15, 1987
- Former channel number: Analog: 56 (UHF, 1987–2009)
- Call sign meaning: "We're Your Indiana Neighbor"

Technical information
- Licensing authority: FCC
- Facility ID: 49803
- ERP: 1,000 kW
- HAAT: 290 m (951 ft)
- Transmitter coordinates: 41°20′56″N 87°24′2″W

Links
- Public license information: Public file; LMS
- Website: www.lakeshorepublicmedia.org

WYIN (channel 56), branded as Lakeshore PBS, is a secondary PBS member television station licensed to Gary, Indiana, United States, serving the Chicago area. It is owned by Northwest Indiana Public Broadcasting, Inc., as a sister station to NPR member WLPR-FM (89.1). The two stations share studios on Indiana Place (Mississippi Street) in Merrillville; WYIN's transmitter is located near Lake Dalecarlia (due south of Cedar Lake). WYIN is one of two PBS member stations in the Chicago television market, alongside WTTW (channel 11).

== History ==
WYIN logo, used until 2006.

=== Prior license history ===
The first television station in northwest Indiana was WCAE, a noncommercial station owned by the Lake Central School Corporation in St. John, which broadcast on UHF channel 50 from September 26, 1967, to March 31, 1983. The station was closed when financial troubles prompted the school board to pull its subsidy, ceasing channel 50's operations.

=== Becoming WYIN ===
Northwest Indiana Public Broadcasting, a group that consisted of former WCAE advisory board members who had split from the school board in 1978, bought the WCAE license in late 1983 and set out to reactivate it. In a convoluted transaction that had as its purpose the construction of a new TV station in Chicago, Metrowest Corporation (owned by Fred Eychaner) paid NIPB $684,000 to join its plan to switch the noncommercial and commercial statuses of Gary's two TV channel allocations, channels 50 and 56. Metrowest had bought a majority stake in the permitholder of WDAI, a commercial station on channel 56; however, channel 56 could not be built from the Sears Tower, while channel 50 could. The payment allowed NIPB to access matching federal grants to construct its own facilities. Metrowest eventually took channel 50 to air as commercial station WPWR-TV (now a MyNetworkTV owned-and-operated station). The WCAE non-commercial license that was now reassigned to channel 56 was reconstructed by NIPB who signed the station on the air as WYIN on November 15, 1987.

For many years, WYIN fought to try to replace its aging transmitter and build a new tower atop either the Sears Tower or the John Hancock Center in downtown Chicago. Its plans, and any floated by WYCC, were bitterly opposed by Window to the World Communications, which used their position as a national programming provider for PBS to turn back any attempts at competition from the two stations all being on an equal platform and transmitter position and power. WYIN pays a lower license fee for its carriage of PBS programs. WTTW station management claimed that if WYIN was allowed to transmit from Sears or the Hancock, it would retain that lower cost for PBS programming, leaving WTTW at a disadvantage as well as taking valuable pledge donations from the station.

In the face of continued objections from WTTW, WYIN opted instead to build a new transmitter tower in Cedar Lake, Indiana. In November 2003, the station erected a 950-foot (290 m) transmission tower at its existing transmitter site, which increased the station's power to 1.35 million watts.

== Newscasts ==
The station began producing a weeknight prime time newscast focusing on local issues in northwest Indiana on September 4, 1990, as the Indiana Nightly Report. This newscast (which was also rebroadcast at midnight each weeknight) originally competed with the hour-long 9 p.m. newscasts that air on WGN-TV (channel 9) and Fox owned-and-operated station WFLD (channel 32).

Production of the program (later renamed 56 Nightly News) was suspended in December 1999, due to the lack of equipment to present a program at a viable technical quality and the issue of production costs for the newscast taking assets away from WYIN's other programming. The station entered into a news share agreement with AT&T Broadband to simulcast the local news program it produced for the provider's local origination channel; on February 5, 2001, WYIN resumed production of the program, now retitled 56 News (later to be renamed Lakeshore News Tonight in 2006). On May 6, 2013, the station expanded its newscasts into two separate broadcasts, with an early evening edition added at 6 p.m. while the late evening broadcast was moved to 10 p.m.

On January 29, 2014, WYIN announced that it would discontinue Lakeshore News Tonight as a daily news program after the January 31 broadcast due to a reduction in the station's funding; WYIN management announced plans to possibly bring back the program in the spring in a retooled format as a weekly program. Members of WYIN's news staff were reassigned to WLPR-FM, Lakeshore Public Media's website, and to work on other projects for WYIN as well as for the revamped newscast. In the interim, news programming on WYIN would be reduced to daily live weather updates which would debut on February 3. In May 2014, the show was relaunched as Lakeshore Report, a half-hour-long review of the week, airing on Friday evenings. Additionally, the station also produces the weekly news and public affairs program Lakeshore Focus also on Friday evenings.

== Technical information ==
=== Subchannels ===
The station's digital signal is multiplexed:

Subchannels of WYIN
Subchannel	Res.	Short name	Programming
56.1	1080i	WYIN-HD	PBS
56.2	1080i	NHK	NHK World

=== Subchannel history ===
==== WYIN-DT2 ====
In September 2010, digital subchannel 56.2 began simulcasting WYIN's main channel (digital subchannel 56.4 also simulcast digital channel 56.1 anamorphic widescreen standard definition, before that subchannel was deleted in 2012). On March 30, 2015, Lakeshore Public Media collaborated with NHK to broadcast its English language network NHK World on digital subchannel 56.2; the subchannel relaunched as an NHK World affiliate on April 1, and was also initially made available on Comcast digital channel 377.

==== WYIN-DT3 (defunct) ====
WYIN previously carried "Lakeshore Kids" on digital subchannel 56.3, featuring children's programs primarily supplied by PBS Kids (some of them were distributed by American Public Television); the subchannel, which launched in 2010, was broadcast in 16:9 anamorphic widescreen standard definition. "Lakeshore Kids" signed off on January 16, 2017, after the launch of the national PBS Kids channel, deferring to WTTW-DT4, which carries the network across the market.

=== Analog-to-digital conversion ===
WYIN began transmitting a digital signal on UHF channel 17 in February 2004, following the securement of a $2 million grant from the Indiana General Assembly; the digital transmission antenna was placed on its then-recently completed transmitter facility near Crown Point.

WYIN shut down its analog signal, over UHF channel 56, on June 12, 2009, the official date on which full-power television stations in the United States transitioned from analog to digital broadcasts under federal mandate. The station's digital signal remained on its pre-transition UHF channel 17, using virtual channel 56.
