= Testament (Shevchenko) =

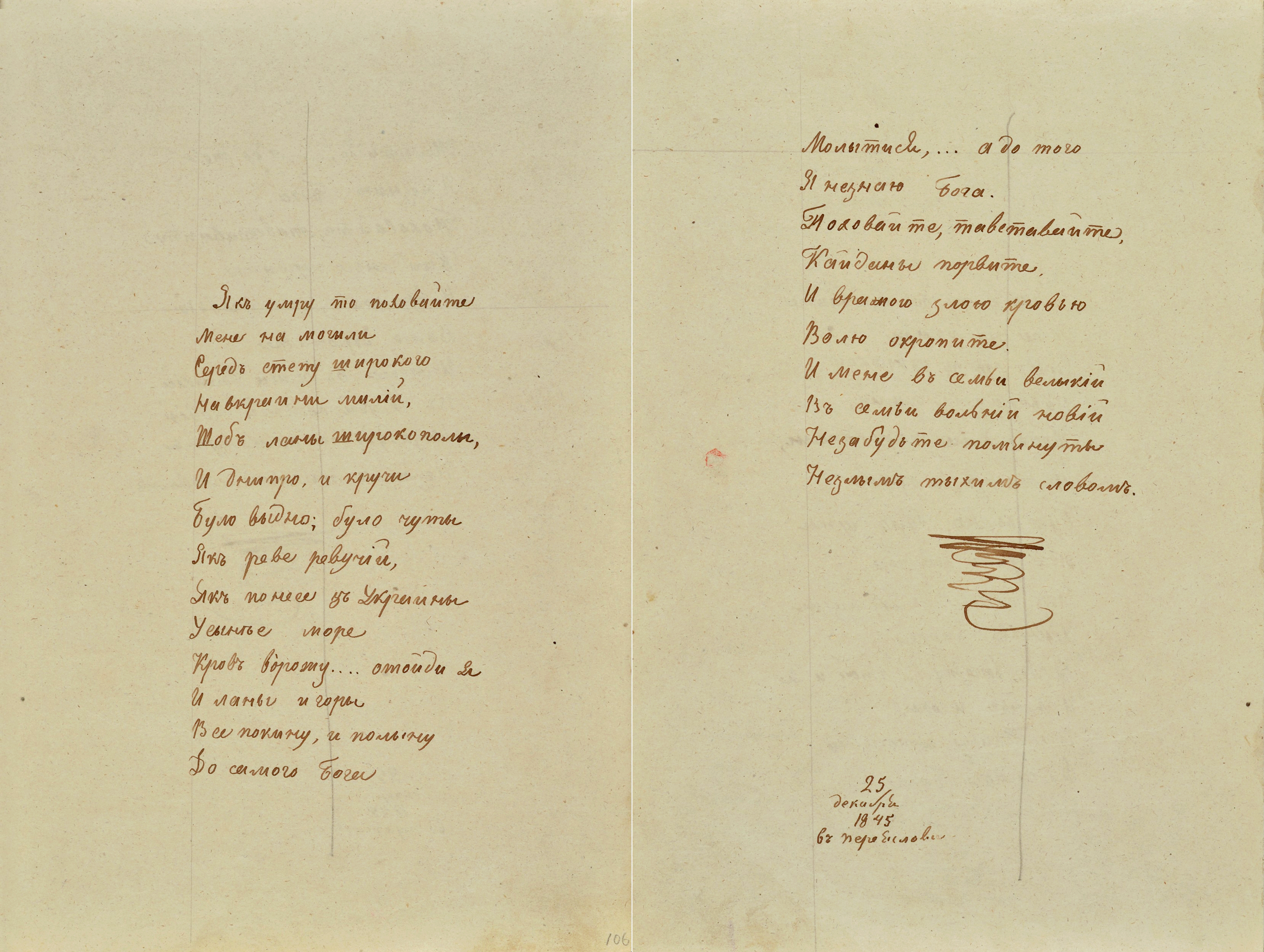
Autograph of the poem

Testament (Ukrainian: Заповіт, romanized: Zapovit), also known by its first line When I Die, Bury Me... (Ukrainian: Як умру, то поховайте...) is a poem by Taras Shevchenko, written on 25 December 1845 in Pereyaslav. It was later included by the author into his Three Summers (Ukrainian: Три літа) poetry collection. Composed in the genre of poetical testament, it also includes features of a hymn. Shevchenko's Testament has been translated into more than 150 languages, making it the fifth most translated non-religious literary work in the world.

== Creation ==
According to scholar Oleksandr Konysky, Shevchenko composed the poem during a period of serious illness, said to be typhus, from which he suffered after getting caught in a snowstorm while travelling in a horse-drawn sled on a visit to the Zakrevsky family manor near Yahotyn on Christmas 1845.

== Publication history ==
The verse was initially spread in handwritten copies, one of which was confiscated by Russian authorities from Vasyl Bilozersky during the 1847 process against the Brotherhood of Saints Cyril and Methodius. It was first printed in 1859 in Leipzig, with omissions and based on a version provided by Panteleimon Kulish. The full text of the poem first saw the light in 1863 in Lviv, once again with differences from the original. The author's edition of the poem was first published in the 1907 edition of Kobzar issued in Saint Petersburg.

== Text ==
Як умру, то поховайте
Мене на могилі,
Серед степу широкого,
На Вкраїні милій,
Щоб лани широкополі,
І Дніпро, і кручі
Було видно, було чути,
Як реве ревучий.
Як понесе з України
У синєє море
Кров ворожу... отоді я
І лани, і гори —
Все покину і полину
До самого Бога
Молитися... а до того
Я не знаю Бога.
Поховайте та вставайте,
Кайдани порвіте
І вражою злою кров'ю
Волю окропіте.
І мене в сiм'ї великій,
В сiм'ї вольній, новій,
Не забудьте пом'янути
Незлим тихим словом.

Taras Shevchenko,
25 December 1845, Pereiaslav

Dig my grave and raise my barrow
By the Dnieper-side
In Ukraine, my own land,
A fair land and wide.
I will lie and watch the cornfields,
Listen through the years
To the river voices roaring,
Roaring in my ears.
When I hear the call
Of the racing flood,
Loud with hated blood,
I will leave them all,
Fields and hills: and force my way
Right up to the Throne
Where God sits alone;
Clasp His feet and pray...
But till that day
What is God to me?
Bury me, be done with me,
Rise and break your chain,
Water your new liberty
With blood for rain.
Then in the mighty family
Of all men that are free,
May be sometimes, very softly
You will speak of me?

Translated by Ethel Lilian Voynich,

When I am dead, bury me
In my beloved Ukraine,
My tomb upon a grave mound high
Amid the spreading plain,
So that the fields, the boundless steppes,
The Dnieper's plunging shore
My eyes could see, my ears could hear
The mighty river roar.
When from Ukraine the Dnieper bears
Into the deep blue sea
The blood of foes ... then will I leave
These hills and fertile fields—
I'll leave them all and fly away
To the abode of God,
And then I'll pray .... But until that day
I know nothing of God.
Oh bury me, then rise ye up
And break your heavy chains
And water with the tyrants' blood
The freedom you have gained.
And in the great new family,
The family of the free,
With softly spoken, kindly word
Remember also me.

Translated by John Weir,
Toronto, 1961

== Legacy ==
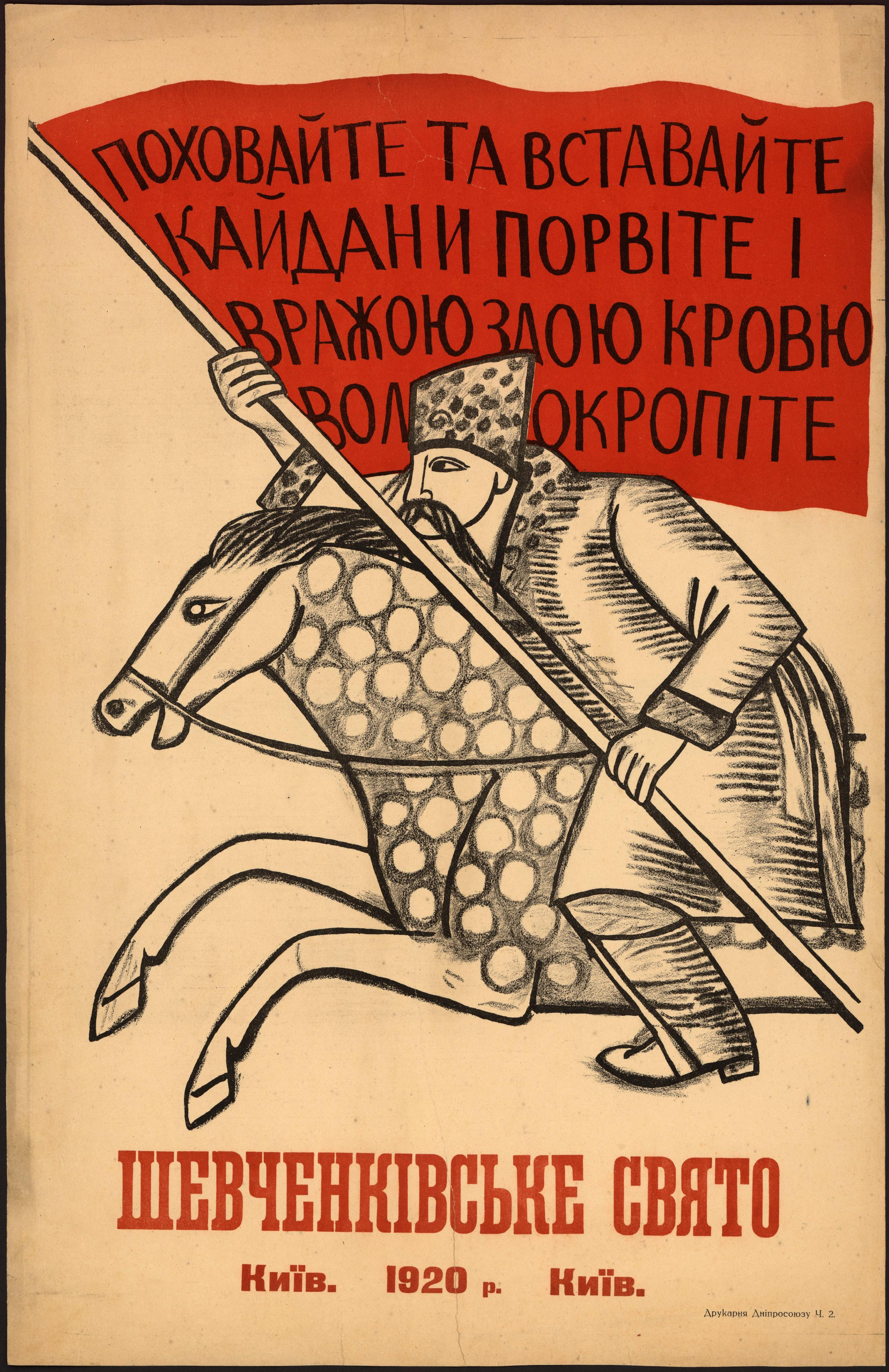
A 1920 poster by Mykhailo Boychuk, containing a line from the poem

Numerous musical settings of the poem have been created, with the earliest ones being presented in 1868 by Mykola Lysenko and Mykhailo Verbytsky. The most popular musical adaptation of the Testament was produced during the early 1870s by Hordii Hladkyi, an amateur composer from Poltava. Numerous choir arrangements of Hladkyi's melody have been created since then. The poem became an inspiration for cantatas by Stanislav Lyudkevych, Borys Lyatoshynsky and Levko Revutsky, as well as for a symphonic poem by Reinhold Glière. An Italian translation of Shevchenko's Testament has been put to music by Dead Rooster.
