= Ukrainian Club =

The Ukrainian Club is a social organization that was created in Kyiv in 1908. It was closed in 1912, but revived in 2002.

== Personalities ==
- Kukharuk Roman - head of Ukrainian Club;
- Lytvynenko Vitaliy Viktorovych - adviser of the head of Ukrainian Club in the field of interconfessional dialogue, Ukrainian journalist.

== History ==
The Ukrainian Club (Ukrainian: Український клуб, transliteration: Ukrayins'kyi klub) was a union of national public figures of Ukraine headed by Mykola Lysenko. The club's meetings were attended by the Ukrainian writers Ivan Nechuy-Levytsky, Lesya Ukrainka, her mother Olena Pchilka and Maxim Rylsky—then a gymnasium pupil—as well as the actors Mariya Zankovetska and Mykola Sadovsky. In addition, Mykhailo Kotsiubynsky, Panas Myrny, and Ivan Franko visited the club during their stays in Kyiv.

In 1912, the Kiev City Council had closed the Ukrainian Club, accusing it of subversive activity. But soon, another Ukrainian society, Rodyna, was arranged in the same building where the former Ukrainian Club met. When the city's administration gave permission to organize the Rodyna club, it was assumed that the stress mark on the first syllable meant motherland, Rodina. However, the members of the club always called it Rodyna (translated as family in Ukrainian).

== See also ==
- Building of Pedagogical Museum

== Sources ==
- Сторінка Українського клубу на сайті «Літературний форум».
