= Hrynky, Zhytomyr Oblast =

Village in Zhytomyr Oblast, Ukraine

Hrynky Гриньки
- Village
- Location within Zhytomyr Oblast Location within Ukraine
- Coordinates: 50°14′50″N 27°31′33″E
- Country: Ukraine
- Oblast: Zhytomyr Oblast
- Raion: Zviahel Raion
- Elevation: 254 m (833 ft)

Population (2001)
  - Total: 325
- Time zone: UTC+2 (EET)
  - Summer (DST): UTC+3 (EEST)

Hrynky (Ukrainian: Гриньки) is a village in Zviahel Raion of Zhytomyr Oblast in Ukraine.

== History ==
Until 27 July 2016, Hrynky was part of the Kashperivka village council. It was also previously located in Baranivka Raion until it was abolished on 18 July 2020 as part of the administrative reform of Ukraine, which reduced the number of raions of Zhytomyr Oblast to four. The area of Baranivka Raion was merged into Novohrad-Volynskyi Raion.

== Demographics ==
Native language as of the Ukrainian Census of 2001:

- Ukrainian 99.69%
- Others 0.31%
