= Mykola Lysenko =

Ukrainian composer and musician (1842–1912)

- Микола Лисенко
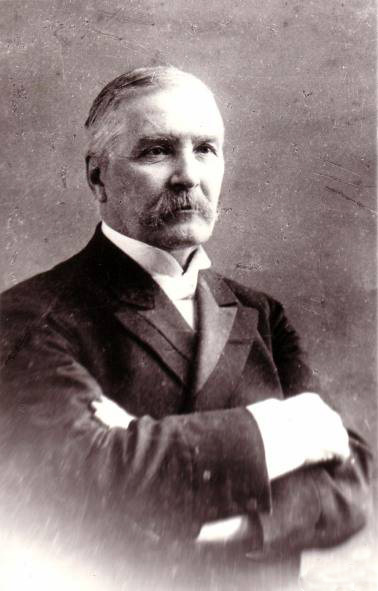
- Lysenko in c. 1900
- Born: 22 March 1842; Grinki, Russian Empire (now Hrynky, Kremenchuk Raion, Poltava Oblast, Ukraine)
- Died: 6 November 1912 (aged 70); Kyiv, Russian Empire (now Ukraine)
- Occupations: Composer; Pianist; Conductor; Ethnomusicologist
- Relatives: Mykhailo Starytsky (cousin); Mariia Starytska (niece); Liudmyla Starytska-Cherniakhivska (niece); Oksana Steshenko (niece); Veronika Chernyakhivska (great-niece)

Mykola Vitaliiovych Lysenko (Ukrainian: Микола Віталійович Лисенко; 22 March 1842 – 6 November 1912) (Note: Some sources record Lysenko's lifetime in the Old Style dating system. In this Lysenko's lifetime would be 10 March 1842 – 24 October 1912) was a Ukrainian composer, pianist, conductor, and ethnomusicologist of the late Romantic period. In his time, he was the central figure of Ukrainian music, with an oeuvre that includes operas, art songs, choral works, orchestral and chamber pieces, and a wide variety of solo piano music. He is often credited with founding a national music tradition during the Ukrainian national revival, in the vein of contemporaries such as Grieg in Norway, The Five in Russia, and Smetana and Dvořák in what is now the Czech Republic.

By studying and drawing from Ukrainian folk music, promoting the use of the Ukrainian language, and separating himself from Russian culture, Lysenko's compositions form what many consider the quintessential essence of Ukrainian music. This is demonstrated in his epic opera Taras Bulba from the novella of the same name by Nikolai Gogol. The grandeur and complexity, and a libretto in Ukrainian, prevented the opera being performed during the composer's lifetime.

To promote and cultivate Ukrainian culture, Lysenko set works by many Ukrainian poets to music, especially Taras Shevchenko, to whom he was particularly devoted. (Note: When Taras Shevchenko died and his body was brought to Ukraine in 1861, Lysenko was a pallbearer at his funeral.) His musical setting of a patriotic poem by Oleksandr Konysky, known as the "Prayer for Ukraine", has become Ukraine's spiritual anthem. Lysenko had a profound influence on later Ukrainian composers, including Stanislav Lyudkevych, Alexander Koshetz, Kyrylo Stetsenko, Yakiv Stepovy, and most importantly, Mykola Leontovych.

He is the namesake of the Mykola Lysenko International Music Competition and the Lysenko music school, which is now the Kyiv National I. K. Karpenko-Kary Theatre, Cinema and Television University. Despite his immense renown in Ukraine, Lysenko remains relatively unknown outside of his home country.

== Life and career ==
=== Early life ===
Mykola Vitaliyovych Lysenko (transliterated in Russian as Nikolay Vitalyevich Lysenko), was born in Hrynky, near Kremenchugsky Uyezd of the Poltava Governorate (now Kremenchuk, Poltava Oblast, Ukraine) on 22 March 1842. His hometown was a small village near the Dnieper river, and between the major cities of Kyiv and Yekaterinoslav. At the time, Ukraine was split between the Russian Empire and Austro-Hungarian Empire. The Lysenko family was wealthy and educated; they were an old aristocratic family stemming back to Cossacks of the 17th-century. Among their descendants were the colonel Ivan Lysenko (d. 1699) who had commanded the Chernihiv Regiment and fought in both the Chyhyrin Campaigns and Azov campaigns; Ivan Lysenko's son, Fedir Lysenko (d. 1751) had served as a yesaul and general judge. Mykola Lysenko's father was Vitaliy Romanovych Lysenko, the great grandson of Fedir and a colonel himself. The composer had two younger siblings, a sister, Sofiya Vitaliivna Staryts'ka and a brother, Andriy Vitaliyovych Lysenko.

Lysenko studied music at an early age, first receiving piano instruction from his mother. At the age of nine, he was brought to Kyiv to continue musical study in boarding schools. He studied piano under Alois Panocini and music theory. His early compositions from this time survive, including a Polka (c. 1851) and Nocturne (1859–1860) for piano, as well as a piece for string orchestra, Moldavskaya, Russian Pizzicato (1859–1860). In 1860, Lysenko attended the Gymnasium of Kharkiv, and studied natural sciences at the city's university, and later at the Kyiv University. At the latter he continued his music studies with Dmitriyev, Wilczyk and Wolner, and graduated in 1865 with a degree in the natural sciences. Lysenko then completed two years of civil service in Tarashcha county as a peace mediator for disputes involving former serfs and their land-ownership claims. He pursued further music studies at the Leipzig Conservatory, Germany, from 1867 to 1869, where his primary teachers included Carl Reinecke for piano as well as Ernst Richter for composition and theory.

=== Emerging composer ===
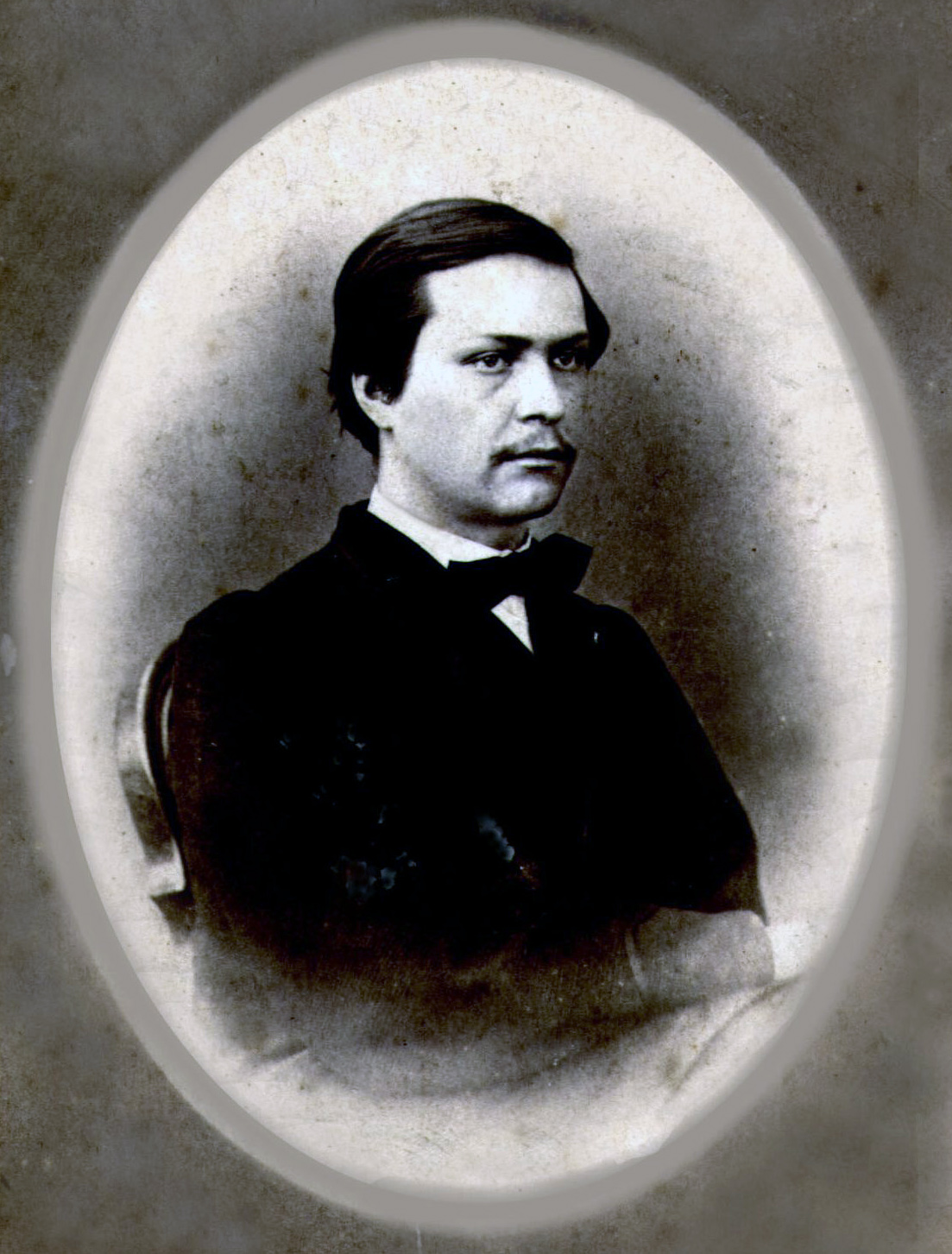
Lysenko in 1865

From his youth, Lysenko had developed an intense enthusiasm for Ukrainian music and culture, particularly from the influence of his grandparents, and his enjoyment of peasant songs. In the early 1860s he began to collect and publish Ukrainian folk songs, often with the minstrel Ostap Veresai's help. He would later publish seven volumes of arrangements and transcriptions of these between 1868 and 1911. The philosophers Vissarion Belinsky, Nikolay Chernyshevsky and Alexander Herzen influenced him.

His early works included musical settings of Ukrainian poets, particularly Taras Shevchenko, an important figure of early Ukrainian literature, whose text he set in the choral work Zapovit ('The Testament'). Two other factors were important to his nationalistic fervor: close relationships with his cousin, Mykhailo Starytsky, the historian Volodymyr Antonovych and the scholar Tadei Rylsky; and also his association with the hromada in Kyiv, the 'Old Society'. Lysenko concluded that music was the best way he could express his patriotism, and aimed to create an independent school of Ukrainian music, rather than duplicate existing styles of Western classical music. In 1869 Lysenko returned to Kyiv, and in the words of music historian Richard Taruskin, "he returned home a committed musical nationalist".

On his return to Kyiv he continued to arrange and study Ukrainian folk melodies. He split his time between numerous activities: giving piano lessons, working at the Russian Musical Society (RMS) chapter in Kyiv, and composing. During this period Lysenko wrote his first opera Chernomortsy (the 'Black Sea Sailors') between 1872 and 1873. Also during these years he wrote an orchestral fantasia, entitled Ukraïns′kyy kazak-shumka (Ukrainian Cossack Song) and a chamber piece for flute, violin and piano, the Fantasy on Ukrainian Themes. Lysenko went to Saint Petersburg from 1874 to 1876 to study orchestration with Nikolai Rimsky-Korsakov. Besides Rimsky-Korsakov, he met with other members of The Five, particularly Modest Mussorgsky, who was working on an opera set in Ukraine, The Fair at Sorochyntsi. During this short stay in Saint Petersburg Lysenko conducted a choir and wrote many piano compositions, writing more than 10 works in a variety of genres.

Sheet music of "There Stands a High Mountain" by Mykola Lysenko

=== Settling in Kyiv ===
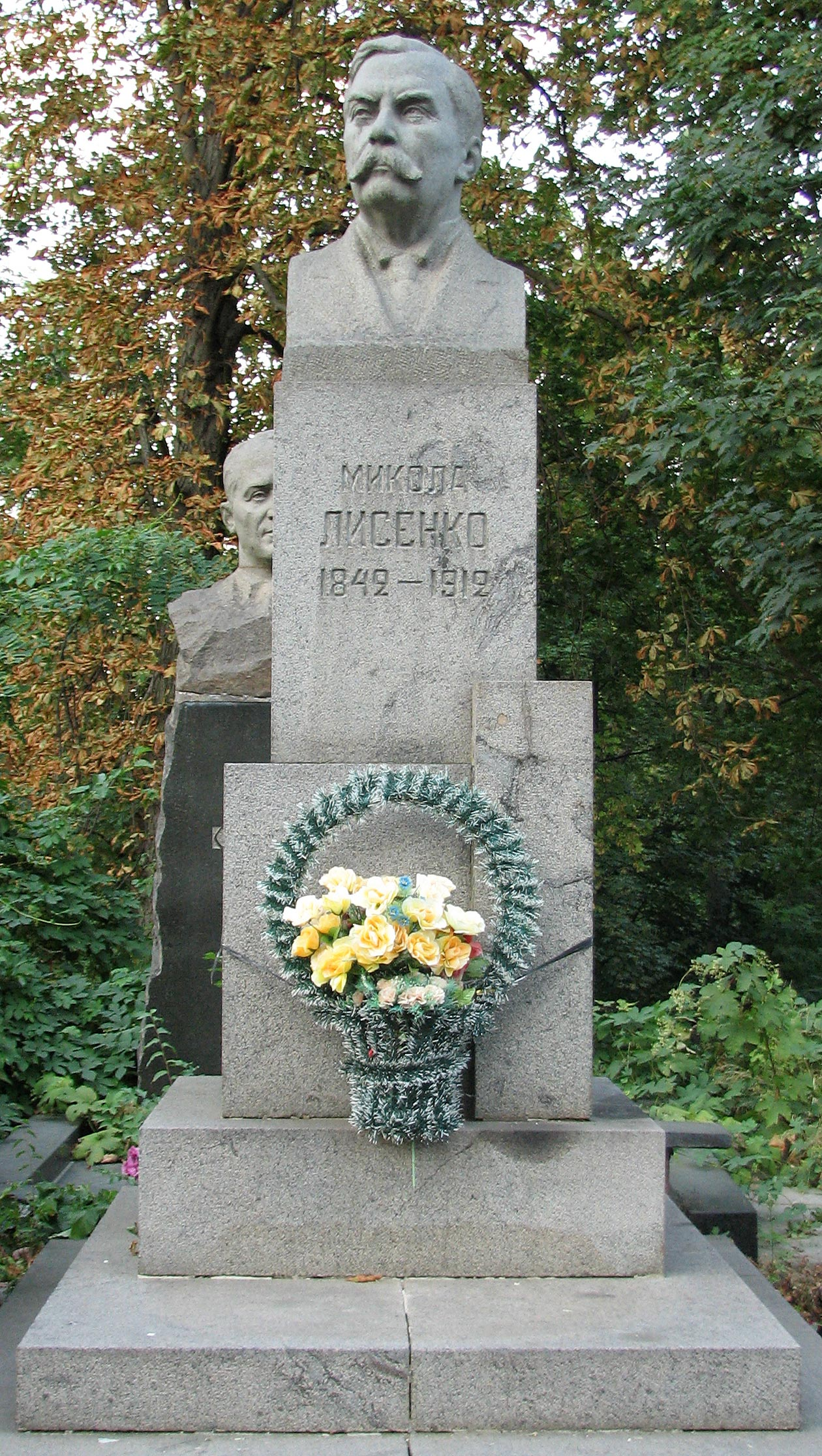
Mykola Lysenko's grave at Baikove Cemetery in Kyiv.

Lysenko led another choir when he returned to Kyiv 1876. Many of the choristers under Lysenko's instruction would become composers, including Levko Revutsky, Porfyrii Demutsky, Kyrylo Stetsenko and his son Ostap Lysenko. Other acitives included organizing concerts for Veresai and giving music lessons, often at the Kyiv Institute for Daughters of the Nobility.

By the late 1870s, Lysenko was recognized as a leading figure in Ukrainian music. As a Ukrainian composer living in a Russian-controlled state he endured continued difficulties from the government. His relationship with the RMS gradually deteriorated, until he was completely ignored. Unlike his Russian colleagues, Lysenko received no state support, and sometimes active resistance from Russian officials. He was repeatedly monitored by the government and often attacked in the local press, because his activities in support of Ukrainian culture made him suspicious to the political officials – in particular his frequent meetings with other Ukrainian patriots, and later, his support of the 1905 revolution and heading of the Ukrainian Club. He was jailed for his stance on the revolution in 1907.

The Ems Ukaz decree of 1876 that banned use of the Ukrainian language in print was one of the obstacles for Lysenko; he had to publish some of his scores abroad, while performances of his music had to be authorized by the imperial censor. For his opera libretti Lysenko insisted on using only Ukrainian. He was so intent on promoting and elevating the Ukrainian culture that he didn't allow his opera Taras Bulba to be translated – he maintained that it was too ambitious to be staged in Ukrainian opera houses. Tchaikovsky was impressed by the opera and wanted to stage the work in Moscow. Lysenko's insistence on it being performed in Ukrainian, not Russian, prevented the performance from taking place in Moscow.

=== Later career ===
In his later years, Lysenko raised funds to open a Ukrainian School of Music, known as the Lysenko music school. Lysenko's daughter Mariana followed in her father's footsteps as a pianist, and his son Ostap also taught music in Kyiv.

== Music ==
A composer, pianist, conductor and ethnomusicologist, Lysenko was the central figure of Ukrainian music in his time. He was a prolific composer, writing many piano pieces, over 100 art songs, as well as operas, orchestral, chamber and choral music.

=== Operas ===
Ostap's aria
Ostap's aria from the opera Taras Bulba

Lysenko's operatic works, include the classical Ukrainian opera Natalka Poltavka, Utoplena (The Drowned Maiden, after Gogol's May Night) and Taras Bulba, Nocturne, and two operas for children—Koza-dereza and Mr. Kotsky.

=== Art songs ===
Art songs by Lysenko
The Dnieper River Rages
Lyrics by Taras Shevchenko. Performed by Pavlo Hunka (bass-baritone) and Albert Krywolt (piano)

Nothing, Simply Nothing
Lyrics by Mykola Voronyi.

On a Clear Night («В ясну ніч»)
Lyrics by Oleksandr Konysky. Performed by Mariana Pochapska (soprano) and Ilona Eltek (piano)

Oriental Melody
Lyrics by Lesia Ukrainka. Performed by Krisztina Szabó (mezzo-soprano) and Albert Krywolt (piano)

Of his Ukrainian colleagues, Lysenko was the composer most committed to art songs (Ukrainian: lirychni pisni). His works in this genre number 133, and "relate a wonderfully descriptive and passionate story of 19th- and early 20th-century European life". These songs are usually through-composed and attentive to the details of the text. His approach blends characteristics from traditional Ukrainian music and Western classical music. From the former are the frequent use of ornamentation, unusual meters, and folk melody-like affects, while from classical music there is a Romantic use of intense chromaticism and rapid shifts between tonal centers, typical of 20th-century classical music. His songs cover a wide variety of topics, described by the musicologist Dagmara Turchyn as an "astoundingly wide [range]—passionate dramatic monologues and meditative elegies, profound philosophical statements and colourful folk scenes, lyrical serenades and ecstatic love songs, a melancholy waltz and a heroic duma, an extensive romantic ballad and a tone poem".

Lysenko set music to many poets, particularly the Ukrainian modernists, which he found the best way to express his patriotic and political beliefs. These included Ivan Franko, Yevhen Hrebinka, Oleksandr Oles, Stepan Rudanskyi, Yakiv Shchoholiv, Mykhailo Starytskyi and Lesya Ukrainka, but also others such as Heinrich Heine, Adam Mickiewicz and Semyon Nadson. He was particularly devoted to Taras Shevchenko, and set 82 texts from the poet's Kobzar collection. In Ukraine, comparisons are often drawn between Lysenko and Shevchenko, both of whom form what many Ukrainians consider the essence of their culture and identity.

=== Other vocal music ===
Aside from art songs, Lysenko's vocal work includes three cantatas for choir and orchestra, all to Shevchenko's texts: Raduisia nyvo nepolytaia (Rejoice, Unwatered Field), Biut’ porohy (The Rapids Roar), Na vichnu pamiat’ Kotliarevs’komu (To the Eternal Memory of Kotliarevsky). He also arranged approximately 500 folk songs for voice and piano, choir and piano, or choir a cappella. He wrote two works for anniversaries of Shevchenko's death, a Funeral March (1888) on words by Ukrainka for the 27th, and a Cantata (1911) for the 50th.

His 1885 choral setting of a patriotic poem by Oleksandr Konysky, originally intended for a children's choir, became known internationally as "Prayer for Ukraine", a spiritual hymn for the country.

=== Piano music ===
Lysenko's larger works for piano include the Ukrainian Suite in Form of Ancient Dances, two rhapsodies (the second, Dumka-shumka is one of his most-known works), Heroic scherzo and Sonata in A minor. He also wrote dozens of smaller works such as nocturnes, polonaises, songs without words, and program pieces. Some of his piano works show the influence of Frédéric Chopin's style.

=== Chamber music ===
Lysenko's chamber music includes a string quartet, a trio for two violins and viola, and a number of works for violin and piano.

== Ethnomusicological work ==
=== Overview ===
Lysenko made the first musical-ethnographic studies of the blind kobzar Ostap Veresai which he published in 1873 and 1874; they are still exemplary. Lysenko continued to research and transcribe the repertoire of other kobzars from other regions such as Opanas Slastion from Poltava and Pavlo Bratytsia from Chernihiv. He also made a thorough study of other Ukrainian folk instruments such as the torban. His collection of essays about Ukrainian folk instruments makes him the founder of Ukrainian organology and one of the first organologists in the Russian Empire.

=== Writings ===
- Lysenko, Mykola (1874). Kharakteristika muzïkal'nïkh osobennostey malorusskikh dum i pesen, ispolnyayemïkh kobzarem Veresayem [The nature of the musical peculiarities of Ukrainian ballads and songs, performed by the kobzar player Veresay]. Kyiv: Muzychna Ukraina.
- —— (July 1888). "Duma o Khel′nitskom i Barabashe" [The ballad of Khel'nitsky and Barabash]. Kievskaya starina.
- —— (March 1892). "O torbane i muzïke pesen Vidorta". Kievskaya starina. 381.
- —— (1894). "Narodnïye muzïkal′nïye instrumentï na Ukraine" [Folk instruments in the Ukraine]. Zorya (4–10). Lviv.
- —— (1955). Hordiychuk, Mykola (ed.). Pro narodnu pisnyu i pro narodnist' v muziki [Folksong and nationalism in music]. Kyiv.

== Legacy and influence ==
The influence of his music and nationalistic style was immense for subsequent Ukrainian composers. Composers such as Stetsenko, Stanyslav Lyudkevych, Alexander Koshetz, Yakiv Stepovy, and mostly importantly, Mykola Leontovych, have acknowledged his influence. Despite his high renown in Ukraine, Lysenko is not particularly well known outside of the country.

From 1950 to 1959, Lysenko's complete works were published in Kyiv in 22 volumes.

A group of Ukrainian composers and musicians, including Yelizaveta Chavdar, Ariadna Lysenko (the composer's granddaughter), Yevhen Rzhanov, Andriy Shtoharenko, Myroslav Skoryk and Yevhen Stankovych founded the Mykola Lysenko International Music Competition in 1962 in honor of Lysenko. Lysenko's home in Kyiv where he resided from 1894 to 1912 was converted into the Mykola Lysenko House-Museum in 1987, one the city's many museums for important cultural figures.
