= Nikolai Dmitriev (composer) =

Russian composer and pianist

Nikolai Dmitrievich Dmitriev (Russian: Николай Дмитриевич Дмитриев, romanized: Nikolay Dmitriyevich Dmitriyev; 5 August [O.S. 24 July] 1829 – 27 July [O.S. 15 July] 1893) was a Russian composer and pianist.

Dmitriev was born in Moscow and attended a boarding school. He studied piano with Alexandre Villoing. Dmitriev served in the judicial department and was a member of a court in Berdyansk. He studied composition and toured Russia, performing in various charity concerts at the same time, as a pianist and conductor (Vyatka, Taganrog, Mariupol, Kazan, Ryazan). Dmitriev's performing career began in the 1840s in Moscow. He lived in Kharkov from 1857, taught piano and flute, and opened a music salon there. He taught Mykola Lysenko in 1858. Dmitriev left Kharkov some time later, returning in 1861. He lived in Ryazan from 1863, Kazan from the 1870s, and Vyatka from 1874. He settled in Taganrog in 1885, where he died in 1893.

As a composer, Dmitriev's musical language was largely influenced by the Russian style and also other Romantic styles. His music is influenced by Mendelssohn, Chopin, and Glinka. Dmitriev's music is distinguished by its virtuosity and expressiveness. He was a composer of mazurkas. Dmitriev also composed a symphony (unfinished), about 100 romances (55 published), and the popular trio In the Wild North.
