= WLPR-FM =

Public radio station in Lowell, Indiana

- Lowell, Indiana; United States
- Broadcast area: Northwest Indiana
- Frequency: 89.1 MHz
- Branding: Lakeshore Public Radio

Programming
- Format: news/talk/NPR
- Affiliations: NPR/APM/PRX/BBC/Indiana Public Broadcasting Stations

Ownership
- Owner: Northwest Indiana Public Broadcasting, Inc.
- Sister stations: WYIN

History
- First air date: 2006
- Former call signs: WWLO (2006–2009)
- Call sign meaning: W Lakeshore Public Radio

Technical information
- Licensing authority: FCC
- Class: A
- ERP: 1,100 watts
- HAAT: 112.2 meters (368 ft)
- Transmitter coordinates: type:city 41°19′24.00″N 87°21′22.00″W

Links
- Public license information: Public file; LMS
- Webcast: Listen live
- Website: www.lakeshorepublicmedia.org

WLPR-FM is an FM noncommercial, public radio station broadcasting on 89.1 MHz in Lowell, Indiana and serving Northwest Indiana. The station is owned and operated by Northwest Indiana Public Broadcasting, Inc. (also known as Lakeshore Public Media), which also owns PBS member station WYIN (channel 56), serving as an alternative to Chicago's WBEZ in the Chicago market's eastern reaches. WLPR broadcasts from the WZVN tower on SR-55, just north of SR-2.

== History ==
The station began broadcasting in 2006, and held the call sign WWLO. It was owned by American Family Association and was an affiliate of American Family Radio. In January 2009, the station was sold to Northwest Indiana Public Broadcasting, Inc. for $1,050,000. On January 16, 2009, its call sign was changed to WLPR-FM and it adopted a public radio format, with programming from NPR.

In June 2026, to mitigate the effects of federal and state funding cuts to public broadcasting, station management announced a partnership with Metropolitan Indianapolis Public Media under which WLPR would simulcast the latter's WBAA West Lafayette beginning on July 6. Lakeshore Public Media will remain the owner of WLPR and continue to solicit donations separately.
