= Mykola Lysenko International Music Competition =

Ukrainian music competition

The Mykola Lysenko Music Competition, named after Mykola Lysenko, was founded in 1962 by the Ukrainian composers Andriy Shtoharenko, Yevhen Stankovych, Myroslav Skoryk, Levko Kolodub, the singer Yelyzaveta Chavdar, pianists Yevhen Rzhanov and the composer's granddaughter Ariadna Lysenko. In 1992, on the 150th anniversary of Lysenko's birth, it acquired international status.

== Most Prestigious ==
Throughout its existence, it has become one of the most prestigious music competitions in Ukraine. Until 1992, it was called the Ukrainian Young Artists Competition. It has been held in Ukrainian various cities, such as Kyiv, Kharkiv, Lviv, Odesa, and Zaporizhzhia. Winners’ Concert was held at Pyotr Tchaikovsky National Music Academy of Ukraine. One of the notable musicians who participated in it was pianist Sophia Agranovich, who won in 1966 and 1970. Since 1992 it has been called the Mykola Lysenko International Music Competition.

The competition jury panel is composed of distinguished musicians from various countries, many of whom being Ukrainian.

The competition repertoire of each participant must include works of classic music as well as works by Lysenko and other Ukrainian composers.

== Starts ==
Thanks to the Lysenko Competition a powerful start in career was given to a number of Ukrainian artists, known worldwide: pianists – Liudmyla Martsevych, Etella Tchupryk, Milana Tcherniavska; violinists Oleksandr Semchuk, Olha Rivniak, and Dima Tkachenko; cellists Hanna Nuzha, Ivan Kucher; singers Lidia Zabiliasta, Andrii Shkurhan, Volodymyr Hryshko, Mykola Shopsha and many others.

The Mykola Lysenko Music Competition is a visiting-card of the Ukrainian music culture and is among the well-known leading competitions in Eastern Europe such as The Tchaikovsky Competition in Russia, Chopin Competition in Poland and several others.

== The Mykola Lysenko International Music Competition (1992) ==
JURY MEMBERS

Piano nomination ():

Violin nomination (Kharkiv):

Cello nomination (Kyiv): Natalia Khoma (Ukraine),

Singing nomination (Odesa):

COMPETITION RESULTS:

Piano nomination (): A.Kutasevych (Ukraine),

Violin nomination (Kharkiv): I prize – Oleksandr Semchuk, (Ukraine);

Cello nomination (Kyiv): I prize – A. Nuzha (Ukraine); II prize – І. Kucher (Ukraine);

Singing nomination (Odesa): In female group: I prize and Grand Prix – Tetiana Anisimova (Ukraine); Grand Prix – Pryimak Petro (Ukraine), III prize – Pryimak Pavlo (Ukraine); Special Prizes "To the best accompanist" – Galyna Radchenko.

== The I Mykola Lysenko International Music Competition (19 November – 6 December 1997) ==
JURY MEMBERS

Piano nomination: Jury Chairman – Mykhailo Stepanenko (Ukraine), Ariadna Lysenko (Ukraine), Ethella Chupryk (Ukraine), Yuriy Ayrapetian (Russia), Jaroslaw Drzewiecki (Poland), Igor Koch (Austria), Luba Zuk (Canada).

Violin nomination: Simon Camartin (Switzerland), Dyusen Kaseinov (Kazakhstan), Michael Striharz (Germany), Igor Frolov (Russia).

Cello nomination: Medeia Abramian (Armenia), Wang Xiang (China), Maris Villerush (Latvia), Jerzy Wujtewicz (Poland), Yulia Panteliat (Austria), Serhiy Usanov (Russia).

Singing nomination: Lyudmyla Kolos (Belarus), Vasile Martinoiu (Romania), Mati Palm (Estonia) and Branislav Jatych (Yugoslavia).

COMPETITION RESULTS:

Piano nomination: І prize – Inna Soldatenko (Ukraine); ІІ prize – Alina Chalikova.

Violin nomination: І prize – Dmytro Tkachenko (Ukraine); ІІ prize – Ostap Shutko (Ukraine).

Cello nomination: І prize – not given; ІІ prize (ex-aequo) – Diana Havata / Kateryna Danylenko.

Singing nomination: In female group: Grand Prix – Liudmyla Monastyrska; І prize – Liudmyla Povstenko; ІІ prize – Zhanna Nimenska.

In male group: І prize – Stanislav Tryfonov; ІІ prize – Mykhailo Kirishev.

== The II Mykola Lysenko International Music Competition (November – December 2002) ==
JURY MEMBERS

Piano nomination:

Violin nomination:

Cello nomination: Yuri Laniuk (Ukraine)

Singing nomination:

COMPETITION RESULTS:

Piano nomination: I prize – U Tsun (China);

Violin nomination: I prize – Anastasia Pylatiuk (Ukraine); II prize – Kyrylo Sharapov (Ukraine); III prize – Lidiya Futorska (Ukraine).

Cello nomination: I prize – Hanna Pyrozhkova (Ukraine);

Singing nomination: In female group: I prize – (Oksana Dyka); In male group: III prize – Kovnir Sergiy (Ukraine)

== The III Mykola Lysenko International Music Competition (27 November – 8 December 2007) ==
JURY MEMBERS

Piano nomination: Jury Chairman – Myroslav Skoryk (Ukraine); Yuri Hildiuk (Belarus); Bronislava Kavallia (Poland); Maryna Kryh (Ukraine); Rada Lysenko (Ukraine); Olena Rikhter (Russia); Vitaly Samoshko (Belgium); Volodymyr Vynnytsky (USA); Liuba Zhuk (Canada).

Violin nomination: Jury Chairman – Bogodar Kotorovych (Ukraine); Anatoliy Bazhenov (Ukraine); Rodney Friend (UK); Dyusen Kaseinov (Kazakhstan); Bohdan Kaskiv (Ukraine); David Takeno (Japan); Dima Tkachenko (Ukraine/UK); Valery Vorona (Russia); Krzysztof Wegrzyn (Germany/Poland).

Cello nomination: Jury Chairman – Yuri Laniuk (Ukraine); Andrzej Bauer (Poland); Marcel Bergman (Israel); Gert von Bulow (Germany); Simon Camartin (Switzerland); Harytyna Kolesa (Ukraine); Natalia Khoma (USA); Ivan Kucher (Ukraine); Florian Leonhard (UK).

Singing nomination: Jury Chairwoman – Yevdokia Kolesnyk (Ukraine); Charlotte Lehmann (Germany); Sergej Martinov (Latvia); Mihail Munteanu (Moldova); Petro Onchul (Ukraine); Galyna Polyvanova (Ukraine); Natalia Rudneva (Belarus); Petro Skusnichenko (Russia); Enrico Stinchelli (Italy).

COMPETITION RESULTS:

Piano nomination: І prize – Dmytro Onyschenko (Ukraine); ІІ prize – Katerynа Kulykova (Ukraine); ІІІ prize – Alexei Chernov (Russia); IV prize – Andriy Dragan (Ukraine); V prize – Tetiana Shafran (Ukraine); Special Prize "For the best performance of a piece by Mykola Lysenko" – Katerynа Kulykova (Ukraine).

Violin nomination: І prize – Solenne Paidassi (France); ІІ prize – Nazariy Pylatiuk (Ukraine); ІІІ prize – Maksym Hrinchenko (Ukraine) and Taras Yaropud (Ukraine); Special Prize "For the best performance of a piece by Mykola Lysenko" – Solenne Paidassi (France); Special Prizes "To the best accompanist" – Kateryna Lebedeva and Svitlana Smykovska.

Cello nomination: І prize – Ruodi Li (China); ІІ prize – Bartosz Koziak (Poland); ІІІ prize – Artem Shmahaylo (Ukraine); IV prize -Maksym Dedikov (Ukraine); V prize – Alexei Shestiperov (Russia); Special Prize "For the best performance of a piece by Mykola Lysenko" – Alexei Shestiperov (Russia); Special Prizes "To the best accompanist" – Olga Cherniak and Jozsef Erminy.

Singing nomination: In female group: І prize – Anna Viktorova (Russia); ІІ prize – Valentyna Andreeva (Ukraine) and Katerina Vasilenko (Russia); ІІІ prize – Melanie Horner (Germany), Yulia Lytvynova (Ukraine) and Natalia Pavlenko (Ukraine); IV prize – Zoya Ivaniuk (Ukraine) and Hu Jing (China); V prize – Elena Demirjian (Moldova).

In male group: І prize – Yuri Horyn (Ukraine); ІІ prize – Yevhen Orlov (Ukraine); ІІІ prize – Dmytro Kuzmin (Ukraine); IV prize – Igor Turkan (Moldova); V prize – Zhu Lu (China); Special Prize "For the best performance of a piece by Mykola Lysenko" – Oleksandr Kireev (Ukraine) and Olga Fomichova (Ukraine); Special Prizes "To the best accompanist" – Marina Belousova (Russia), Viktoria Mramornova (Ukraine), Margaryta Serhienko (Ukraine) and Olga Filatova (Ukraine)

== The IV Mykola Lysenko International Music Competition (15–24 November 2012) ==
Jury Members

Piano nomination	Violin nomination	Cello nomination	Singing nomination
Chairman: Valeriy Kozlov (Ukraine)	Chairman: Anatoliy Bazhenov (Ukraine)	Chairman: Ivan Kucher (Ukraine)	Chairman: Maria Stefiuk (Ukraine)
Tetiana Verkina (Ukraine)	Tadeusz Gadzina (Poland)	Leonid Gorokhov (United Kingdom)	Azad Aliyev (Azerbaijan)
Alexei Grynyuk (Ukraine-United Kingdom)	Liana Isakadze (Georgia-Germany)	Ion Josan (Moldova)	Wilma Vernocchi (Italy)
Nazzareno Carusi (Italy)	Oleh Krysa (United States)	Simon Camartin (Switzerland)	Teimuraz Gugushvili (Georgia)
Oleksandr Kozarenko (Ukraine)	Florian Leonhard (Germany)	Michael Carrera (United States)	Sergei Leiferkus (Russia)
Emanuel Krasovsky (Israel)	Igor Pylatiuk (Ukraine)	Yuriy Laniuk (Ukraine)	Paolo Olmi (Italy)
Sachiko Minami (Japan)	Dima Tkachenko (Ukraine-United Kingdom)	Julia Pantelyat (Austria)	Stephan Piatnychko (Ukraine)
Igor Olovnikov (Belarus)	Qian Zhou (Singapore)	Dimitris Patras (Greece)	Anatoliy Solovianenko (Ukraine)
Dmytro Sukhovienko (Belgium)	Takashi Shimizu (Japan)	Valentyn Potapov (Ukraine)	Liudmyla Shemchuk (Ukraine)

List of prizewinners

	Piano nomination	Violin nomination	Cello nomination	Singing nomination
First Prize	Not awarded	Not awarded	Shadrin Oleksiy (Ukraine)	Yevdokymenko Ihor (Ukraine), Kulchynska Olga (Ukraine)
Second Prize	Muradov Rustam (Russia)	Filipov Roman (Russia)	Pavlovskiy Anton (Russia)	Dytiuk Valentyn (Ukraine), Kalinkina Tamara (Ukraine)
Third Prize	Kim Sergey (Kazakhstan)	Jeong Da Sol (Canada), Kuratomi Ryota (Japan)	Diedikov Maxym (Ukraine)	Honiukov Andriy (Ukraine), Kniazeva Daria (Ukraine)
Fourth Prize	Sayenko Danylo (Ukraine)	Korniev Oleksandr (Ukraine)	Poludenny Artem (Ukraine)	Du Fanyong (China), Lesyk-Sadivska Ivanna (Ukraine)
Fifth Prize	Kozlowski Mischa (Poland), Valentiev Valentyn (Ukraine)	Maximov Chiril (Moldova)	Trofymchuk Yaroslava (Ukraine)	Stetsky Andriy (Ukraine), Ganina Tetiana (Ukraine)

Special Prize «For the best performance of a piece by Mykola Lysenko»

Piano nomination	Violin nomination	Cello nomination	Singing nomination
Sayenko Danylo (Ukraine)	Zatsiha Vasyl (Ukraine)	Shadrin Oleksiy (Ukraine)	Honiukov Andriy (Ukraine), Kulchynska Olga (Ukraine)

Special Prize – «To the best competition accompanist»

Violin nomination	Cello nomination	Singing nomination
Chekina Tetiana (Ukraine), Zuyko Illia (Ukraine)	Kalinin Stanislav (Ukraine)	Kicherska Maryna (Ukraine), Korolko Natalia (Ukraine)

Special Awards

A violin bow by the violin maker Ihor Gontar (Ukraine): Mengchan Zhao (China)

A cello bow by the violin maker Ihor Gontar (Ukraine): Yaroslava Trofymchuk (Ukraine)

Recital engagement offered at the Festival “Harmonie Starego Miasta” (The Wieniawski Music Society in Lublin): Oleksandr Korniev (Ukraine), Orest Smovzh (Ukraine), Rustam Muradov (Russia)

Recital engagement offered at the Lviv Philharmonic Hall: Paulina Kusa (Poland)

Solo recital engagement offered from Mikrokosmos Society in Ravenna (Italy): Rustam Muradov (Russia)

Concert engagements from XXVI Kos-Anatolsky Ukrainian music festival: Oleksandr Korniev (Ukraine), Valentyn Valentiev (Ukraine), Artem Poludenny (Ukraine)

== Links ==
- Official website
- The 2nd Mykola Lysenko International Music Competition
- The 3rd Mykola Lysenko International Music Competition
