= Hrynky, Poltava Oblast =

Village in Poltava Oblast, Ukraine

Hrynky Гриньки
- Village
- Location within Poltava Oblast Location within Ukraine
- Coordinates: 49°27′29″N 33°01′44″E
- Country: Ukraine
- Oblast: Poltava Oblast
- Raion: Kremenchuk Raion
- Hromada: Hradyzk settlement hromada

Population (2001)
  - Total: 704
- Time zone: UTC+2 (EET)
  - Summer (DST): UTC+3 (EEST)

Hrynky (Ukrainian: Гриньки) is a village in Kremenchuk Raion of Poltava Oblast in Ukraine. It belongs to Hradyzk settlement hromada, one of the hromadas of Ukraine.

== History ==
Hrynky was formed in the late 17th/early 18th century by escaped serfs who settled here. In 1780, the village consisted of 53 huts, which grew to 189 households with 1245 residents by 1859.

Hrynky was previously located in the Hlobyne Raion until it was abolished on 18 July 2020 as part of the administrative reform of Ukraine, which reduced the number of raions of Poltava Oblast to four. The area of Hlobyne Raion was merged into Kremenchuk Raion.

== Geography ==
Hrynky is located not far north of the Highway H08 on the T-1721 territorial road, 21 km (13 mi) northwest of Hlobyne, 65 km (40 mi) north of Kremenchuk and 140 km (87 mi) west of Poltava.

== Demographics ==
Native language as of the Ukrainian Census of 2001:

- Ukrainian 97.37%
- Russian 2.5%

== Notable people ==
- Mykola Lysenko (1842–1912), composer.
