= Lisa Sniderman =

American folk pop artist

Aoede
- Also known as: Aoede
- Born: Lisa Sniderman
- Origin: San Francisco, California
- Genre: Folk pop
- Occupations: Musician and playwright
- Years active: 2008–present
- Label: Aoede Muse Music
- Website: www.aoedemuse.com

Aoede (born Lisa Sniderman) is a folk pop artist and playwright based in San Francisco.

== Career ==
Aoede won the Album of the Year for her 2011 release Affair with the Muse, and Best Folk / Acoustic Artist in the inaugural 2012 Artists in Music Awards, Aoede also won Album of the Year 2012. Aoede is a WomensRadio.com's recipient of a Top Album of the Decade honor and Top Artist of the Year for 2008 in recognition of her CD release Push and Pull. Aoede was a 2013 John Lennon Finalist in the children's category for Fairy Tale Love and a 2012 Finalist for Little Things, NY Stage Play Finalist for Do You Believe in Magic?, adapted from Aoede's original fantasy musical recorded as an audiobook featuring songs, dialogue, narration, sound effects and full instrumental score, NY Stage Play Finalist and Ruble New Play Festival Finalist for What Are Dreams Made Of?, adapted from her full-length original fantasy musical, one of the first original musicals recorded on an audiobook. Aoede was also among the 13th Annual Independent Music Awards Vox Pop Winners and was also an International Song Writing Competition winner for Fairy Tale Love.

Sniderman suffers from a rare and debilitating auto-immune disease called dermatomyositis. She also co-founded WomenROCK, a Bay Area-based women-in-music advocacy group.

== Discography ==
- Ear Candy (2006)
- Push and Pull (2008)
- Affair with the Muse (2011)
- Skeletons of the Muse (2012)
- Is Love a Fairy Tale? (2012)
- What Are Dreams Made Of? (2013)
- Do You Believe in Magic? (2015)
- The Grieving Project (2020)
- Imaginarium (2021)

== See also ==
- Indie Music
