= Mariia Starytska =

Ukrainian actress and director (1865–1930)

- Марія Старицька
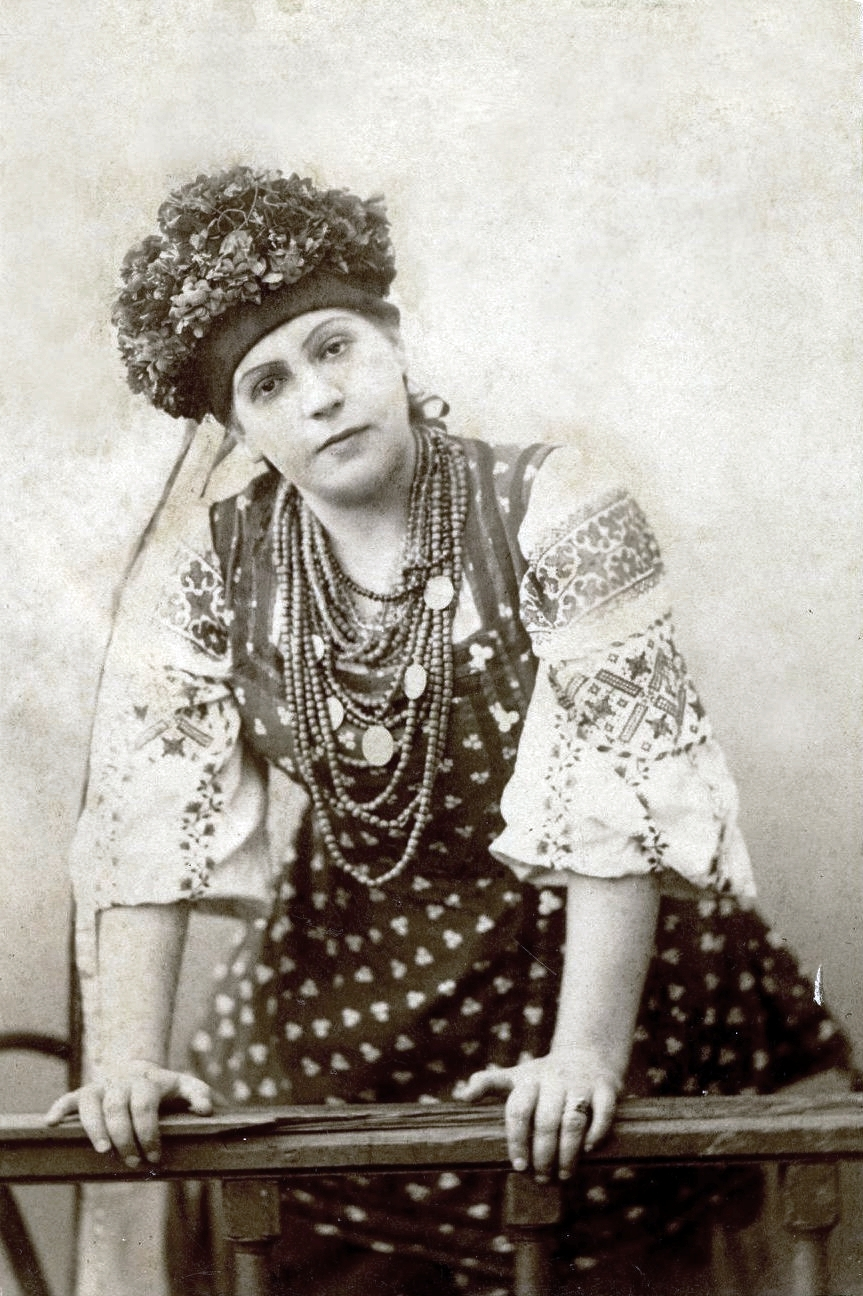
- Starytska in the 1880s
- Born: Марія Михайлівна Старицька; Mariia Mykhailivna Starytska; 19 [O.S. 31] May 1865; Lebekhivka, Kremenchugsky Uyezd, Poltava Governorate, Russian Empire (now Ukraine)
- Died: 20 December 1930 (aged 65); Kyiv, Ukrainian SSR, USSR
- Burial place: Baikove Cemetery
- Other names: Yavorska
- Education: Bestuzhev Courses, 1884; Women's Higher Courses, 1886
- Occupations: Actor; stage director
- Father: Mykhailo Starytsky
- Relatives: Liudmyla Starytska-Cherniakhivska (sister); Oksana Steshenko (sister); Yaroslav Steshenko (nephew); Veronika Chernyakhivska (niece); Mykola Lysenko (uncle)
- Awards: Merited Artist of the Ukrainian SSR

Mariia Mykhailivna Starytska (Ukrainian: Марія Михайлівна Старицька; 19 [O.S. 31] May 1865 – 20 December 1930) was a Ukrainian and Soviet actress and stage director.

== Early life and education ==
Mariia Mykhailivna Starytska was born on 19 [O.S. 31] May 1865 in the selo of Lebekhivka, (Note: Now submerged beneath the Kremenchuk Reservoir.) Poltava Governorate (present-day Poltava Oblast, Ukraine) to Mykhailo Starytsky and Sofiia Starytska. Starytska was the eldest daughter of Mykhailo Starytsky and the sister of Liudmyla Starytska-Cherniakhivska and Oksana Steshenko.

Starytska went to the first kindergarten in Kyiv, which was administered by Maria Lindfors and Sofia Lindfors. She and her sister Liudmyla studied Ukrainian language, literature, and history at home from their parents and their family, even though they attended a private gymnasium that followed the Russian imperial curriculum. Marko Kropyvnytskyi's performances deeply influenced Starytska and sparked her love for Ukrainian theatre. Though she declined his marriage proposal—perhaps due to their age gap or her educational goals—she always held him in high esteem.

Starytska completed her education at the first private women's gymnasium in Kyiv in 1882. In 1883, while her father supported Kropyvnytskyi's theatre troupe, she chose to pursue further studies. Though previously believed to have graduated from the Bestuzhev Courses in Saint Petersburg, archival records confirm she attended the Kyiv Women's Higher Courses from 1884 to 1886, after studying natural sciences at the Bestuzhev Courses from 1883 to 1884. Her enrolment had full parental backing and official approval. In 1886, following the dissolution of her father's financially strained troupe, Starytska joined his new company, touring across the Russian Empire and assisting with both performances and organisational duties until 1890.

In 1891, Starytska moved to Moscow to live with her uncle, Volodymyr Nemirovych-Danchenko, and study theatre under Aleksandr Fedotov. She continued her training in Saint Petersburg and began her independent acting career under the stage name Yavorska. From 1891 to 1893, she attended theatre courses with Fedotov in both cities. In 1894, she signed a professional contract with the Vasileostrovsky Theatre in Saint Petersburg, committing to a wide range of stage duties under strict conditions, and earning a monthly wage of fifty rubles.

== Career ==
Starytska performed with her father's troupe from 1886 to 1890, and under the stage name r, appeared at the theatre on Vasilyevsky Island, the Okhta People's House, and the workers' theatre near the Narva Gate in Saint Petersburg between 1894 and 1896. She later joined her father's troupe in 1897 and again in 1908. She was known for her character roles, including Anna Petrivna, Lymarykha, the Mother, and Hanna in It Was Not Meant to Be, Chasing Two Hares, Marusia Bohuslavka, Bohdan Khmelnytsky, and The Last Night by Starytskyi, as well as Kabanikha in The Storm by Alexander Ostrovsky, among others.

Starytska began her teaching career as a mentor and stage director in amateur workers' theatre circles across Kyiv, including areas such as Kurenivka, Shuliavka, Demiivka, Solomianka, and Darnytsia, as well as at the Lukianivka, Troitske, and Bulvarno-Kudriavskyi people's houses. From 1904, she taught acting at the music and drama schools of M. Lisnevych-Nosova and Mykola Lysenko, where she led the drama department and, following Lysenko's death in 1912, assumed leadership of the school.

Dedicated to nurturing young theatrical talent as much as providing entertainment, Starytska actively encouraged promising students she discovered in Kyiv's amateur theatre scene. She not only planned performances but also took on roles herself when needed, offering hands-on guidance and critique. Between 1904 and 1917, she directed over 500 productions spanning Ukrainian, Russian, and Western European works. Her collaboration with Mykola Sadovskyi at the Trinity People's House included a landmark 1908 staging of her father's historical drama The Last Night, featuring Ivan Maryanenko and Maria Zankovetska.

Starytska was a key player in the Sadovsky Theatre's 1914 staging of Lesya Ukrainka's The Stone Master. She worked with Ivan Steshenko and director Aleksandr Matkovsky, while Ivan Burachok provided the set. Together, they overcame the difficult task of modifying a global historical issue for the Ukrainian stage. The premiere was universally hailed as a landmark in Ukrainian theatre, and her inventive direction successfully captured the Spanish setting while retaining a distinctively Ukrainian identity. She was acknowledged by Ivan Maryanenko with improving his use of the artistic word.

After the February Revolution of 1917, Starytska intensified her efforts to promote Ukrainian theatre, organising the Circle of Ukrainian Artists by bringing together students from the Lysenko School and actors from Les Kurbas's "Young Theatre." Appointed acting head of the theatre department in the Secretariat of Education of the Ukrainian People's Republic, she helped shape a national theatre framework and staged timely productions, including the emblematic Revolutionary Movement. Throughout the 1920s, she remained an active force in cultural life—performing with the First Ukrainian State Drama Theatre, delivering dramatic readings at public concerts, and continuing to teach at the Mykola Lysenko Higher Music and Drama Institute. She also engaged in various cultural societies such as Boyan, Prosvita, and the Ukrainian club Rodyna. Her contributions were formally recognised with the titles of honoured professor and Merited Artist of the Ukrainian SSR, and in 1927, her 40-year artistic career was celebrated at the Kyiv Opera House. Known not only for her serious dramatic work, she also had a gift for humour, famously delighting even Lysenko with a clever parody of a popular singer.

== Death ==
Starytska invited the family of musicologist Mykola Grinchenko to move into her family's apartment in 1930 in an attempt to prevent it from being seized amid political repression after her sister Lyudmyla and brother-in-law were arrested in connection with the alleged "Union for the Liberation of Ukraine" case. She lived in apartment No. 18 on the top floor of the building at the intersection of Oles Honchar Street and Yaroslaviv Val in Kyiv at the time, and she worked at the Mykola Lysenko Music and Drama Institute. Her health was probably impacted by the stress of these events, and she died on 20 December 1930. On the central alley of Baikove Cemetery, across from her parents and close to Lysenko and Steshenko, she was buried.

== Legacy ==
The Mykhailo Starytskyi Memorial Museum (Saksahanskoho St. 97, Kyiv) opened its doors in 2002.

== Awards ==
- Merited Artist of the Ukrainian SSR (1926)
