= Veronika Chernyakhivska =

Ukrainian writer (1900–1938)

- Вероніка Черняхівська
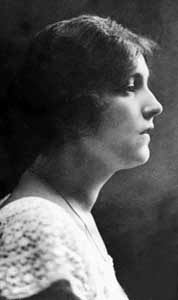
- Chernyakhivska in the 1920s
- Born: Вероніка Олександрівна Черняхівська; Veronika Oleksandrivna Chernyakhivska; 25 April [O.S. 8 May] 1900; Kyiv, Kiev Governorate, Russian Empire
- Died: 22 September 1938 (aged 38); Kyiv, Ukrainian SSR, USSR
- Cause of death: Execution by shooting
- Occupations: Poet; translator
- Spouse(s): Theodor Hecken (m. 1928) Mykola Hansha (m. 1938)
- Parents: Oleksandr Chernyakhivsky (father); Liudmyla Starytska-Cherniakhivska (mother)
- Relatives: Mariia Starytska (aunt); Oksana Steshenko (aunt); Ivan Steshenko (uncle); Yaroslav Steshenko (cousin); Mykhailo Starytsky (grandfather); Mykola Lysenko (great-uncle)

Veronika Oleksandrivna Chernyakhivska (Ukrainian: Вероніка Олександрівна Черняхівська); 25 April [O.S. 8 May] 1900 – 22 September 1938 in Kyiv) was a Ukrainian poet and translator. Executed during the Great Purge, Chernyakhivska is considered a part of the Executed Renaissance.

== Life ==
Chernyakhivska was born on 25 April [O.S. 8 May] 1900 in Kyiv, Russian Empire (present-day, Ukraine) to Oleksandr Chernyakhivsky (1869–1939), a physician, and Liudmyla Starytska-Cherniakhivska, a writer, translator, and literary critic.

Chernyakhivska received an excellent education and upbringing, learning foreign languages and playing the piano at a young age. She took part in theater performances and music evenings held in the Ukrainian Club and in Lysenko's house. After the February Revolution of 1917, the Secretary General for Education Ivan Steschenko, her aunt's husband, opened the Second Ukrainian Gymnasium. She attended it with enthusiasm and was awarded a gold medal as one of the best students at her graduation in June 1918. At the age of seventeen, she fell in love with officer Konstantin "Koka" Veligorski, who enlisted as a volunteer in the army of the autonomous republic. Like several of her classmates, he was killed on the Northern Front in January 1918. She only received the news of his death in August.

The following year her father and the medical institute were evacuated. Beset by Bolshevik and then " white " rule, she and her mother set out to look for her father. After several weeks they found him in Kamenets-Podolsk. There, Veronika Chernyakhivska translated articles from foreign newspapers into Ukrainian, worked in a military hospital, and helped the sick in a typhus hospital. In May 1920, with the government of Symon Petliuras, the family returned to half-destroyed Kiev. She tried to support herself and, while studying at the Institute of Foreign Relations, worked in jobs including the National Library. After that, she earned her living through literary and translation work. From 1922 to spring 1923 she worked in the parcel office of the American Relief Administration (ARA). After its dissolution, she worked as a clerk and printer in the People's Commissariat. After graduating, she worked mainly as a translator. She was fluent in ancient Greek, Latin, Russian, French, German and English.

In 1926, Chernyakhivska and her father moved to Berlin for five months, where she assisted him in translating from German and attended courses in modern German art. She then became a student at the University of Berlin, improved her English and German skills and traveled extensively throughout Europe. As this marriage also failed, she returned to Kiev in 1929.

== Arrests and execution ==
In autumn 1929, Chernyakhivska was arrested as part of the Union for the Freedom of Ukraine trial. Chernyakhivska was later released in January 1930 due to lack of evidence. Chernyakhivska's parents were then arrested and later convicted as part of the same show trail. Chernyakhivska 's mother, Liudmyla Starytska-Cherniakhivska, served a suspended sentence in Stalino (present-day Donetsk).

On 9 January 1938, as part of the Great Purge, Chernyakhivska was arrested on suspicion of carrying out espionage for Germany. Whilst awaiting trail Chernyakhivska was held at Lukyanivska Prison. Chernyakhivska later received the death penalty and was raped before being executed by shooting on 22 September 1938 in Kyiv.

== Personal life ==
She married in 1921, but the marriage fell apart after eight months.

In 1928, Chernyakhivska married the German banker Theodor Hecken.

In 1938, Chernyakhivska married the mathematician Mykola Hansha.

=== Family ===
Through her mother Chernyakhivska was the granddaughter of Mykhailo Starytsky, a writer, poet and playwright, and Sofiia Starytska, an activist, entrepreneur and actress. Chernyakhivska was the maternal niece of Mariia Starytska, an actress and director, and Oksana Steshenko, a writer, translator and educator.

Chernyakhivska's great-uncle was the composer, pianist, conductor and ethnomusicologist Mykola Lysenko.
