= Yaroslav Steshenko =

Ukrainian bibliographer and bibliographical scholar (1904–1939)

- Ярослав Стешенко
- Born: Ярослав Іванович Стешенко; Yaroslav Ivanovych Steshenko; 6 April [O.S. 24 March] 1904; Kyiv, Kiev Governorate, Russian Empire (now Ukraine)
- Died: 11 March 1939 (aged 34); Nagaev Bay, Russian SSR, USSR (Now Russia)
- Education: Kyiv Higher Institute of Education, 1921; Kyiv National Economic University, 1930
- Occupations: bibliographer; bibliographical scholar; art critic
- Parents: Ivan Steshenko (father); Oksana Steshenko (mother)
- Relatives: Mariia Starytska (aunt); Liudmyla Starytska-Cherniakhivska (aunt); Mykhailo Starytsky (grandfather); Veronika Chernyakhivska (cousin); Mykola Lysenko (great-uncle)

Yaroslav Ivanovych Steshenko (6 April [O.S. 24 March] 1904–11 March 1939; Ukrainian: Ярослав Іванович Стешенко) was a Ukrainian and Soviet bibliographer, bibliographical scholar, bibliophile and art critic. Frequently arrested by the Soviet authorities, Steshenko died in a gulag camp and is considered part of the Executed Renaissance.

== Biography ==
Steshenko was born 6 April [O.S. 24 March] 1904 in Kyiv, Russian Empire (present-day, Ukraine) to Ivan Steshenko and Oksana Steshenko (née Starytska). Steshenko's father was a politician, literary scholar, poet, writer, translator and his mother was a children's writer, translator and teacher. Steshenko was the younger brother of the actress Iryna Steshenko. Through his mother Steshenko was the grandson of Mykhailo Starytsky and Sofiia Starytska, and the nephew of Mariia Starytska and Liudmyla Starytska-Cherniakhivska. Steshenko was also the cousin of Veronika Chernyakhivska, and the great-nephew of Mykola Lysenko.

In 1918, aged 14, Steshenko witnessed the assassination of his father by members of the Red Army. In 1920, Steshenko graduated from gymnasium in Kyiv. During this time Steshenko also attended a course in librarianship, and worked at the Dneprosoyuz book warehouse from 1919 to 1920. From 1920 to 1921, Steshenko studied literary cycles at the Kyiv Higher Institute of Education. In 1930, (Note: Also cited as 1928.) Steshenko graduated from Kyiv National Economic University.

== Career ==
In 1928, Steshenko became a member of the Russian Bibliographic Society at Moscow University and became a member of the Leningrad Society of Bibliophiles in 1929.

Steshenko compiled indexes of works by Heorhiy Narbut and Sergiy Maslov, and co-authored a catalogue of publications of the All-Ukrainian Academy of Sciences with Mykola Ivanchenko.

Steshenko collected bookplates, and was a corresponding member of the Leningrad Society of Bookplate Artists. Part of Steshenko's bookplate collection is housed at the Museum of Outstanding Figures of Ukrainian Culture.

== Arrests and death ==
In 1921, aged 17, Steshenko was arrested on charges of belonging to a counter-revolutionary youth organisation, but was later released due to lack of evidence. Steshenko was arrested in 1923 on charges of belonging to the anti-Bolshevik Cossack Council of Right-Bank Ukraine, but was later released due to lack of evidence.

In autumn 1929, Steshenko was imprisoned as part of the Union for the Freedom of Ukraine trial. Steshenko plead not-guilty and was later released in 1930 due to the absence of criminal wrongdoing. In 1933, Steshenko was arrested in Kharkiv as part of the "Archaeologists–Zhupans" (Ukrainian: Археологів–Жупанів) case and was exiled to Uralsk, Kazakh SSR (present-day Oral, Kazakhstan). Steshenko was sentenced in 1936 to hard labor at a gulag camp in Kolyma.

On 11 March 1939 Steshenko died aged 34 at a gulag camp in Nagaev Bay. Steshenko was posthumously rehabilitated in September 1956.

== Legacy ==
A compilation of Steshenko's letters by Yevhen Pshenichny was published as Yaroslav Steshenko: Epistolary Monologue in 2020.

== Publications ==
- Steshenko, Yaroslav (1926) Heorhii Narbut: Posthumous Exhibition of Works, T. Shevchenko All-Ukraine Historical Museum. Kyiv: Derzhvydav Ukraїny.
- Ivanchenko, M.; Peretz, V.; Steshenko, Y. (1927). Sergiy Maslov 1902–1927. Kyiv: Ukrainian Scientific Institute of Book Studies.
- Steshenko, Yaroslabv; Ivanchenko, M. (1930). Systematic Catalog of Publications of the All-Ukrainian Academy of Sciences, 1918–1929'. Kyiv: All-Ukrainian Academy of Sciences.

=== Unpublished ===
- Bibliography of Ukrainian Bibliography and Bibliology
- Bibliography of the History of Ukrainian Printing (1925)
- Bibliographic Index of Books Printed in Ukrainian on the Territory of Russia in 1798–1916 (Note: A version of which is held at the Shevchenko Institute of Literature, National Academy of Sciences of Ukraine.)
