= Liudmyla Starytska-Cherniakhivska =

Ukrainian writer, translator, and literary critic

- Людмила Старицька-Черняхівська
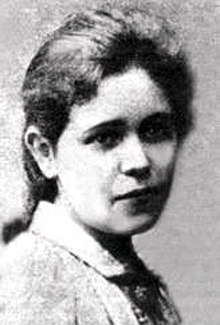
- Starytska-Cherniakhivska in the 19th century
- Born: Liudmyla Mykhailivna Starytska; Людмила Михайлівна Старицька; 17 August [O.S. 29 August] 1868; Kyiv, Kiev Governorate, Russian Empire (now Ukraine)
- Died: 1941 (aged 71–72); USSR
- Occupations: Writer; translator; literary and theater critic; politician
- Spouse: Oleksandr Chernyakhivsky
- Children: Veronika Chernyakhivska
- Parents: Mykhailo Starytsky (father); Sofiia Starytska (mother)
- Relatives: Mariia Starytska (sister); Oksana Steshenko (sister); Yaroslav Steshenko (nephew); Ivan Steshenko (brother-in-law); Mykola Lysenko (uncle)

Liudmyla Starytska-Cherniakhivska (née Starytska; Ukrainian: Людмила Михайлівна Старицька-Черняхівська, 17 August [O.S. 29 August] 1868 – 1941) was a Ukrainian writer, translator, literary and theater critic and politician. Accused of anti-Soviet activity, Starytska-Cherniakhivska died while being transported to a gulag camp.

== Biography ==
Liudmyla Mykhailivna Starytska (Ukrainian: Людмила Михайлівна Старицька) was born on 17 August [O.S. 29 August] 1868 in Kyiv, Russian Empire (present-day Ukraine) to a Ukrainian intelligentsia family. Starytska-Cherniakhivska's father, Mykhailo Starytsky, was a writer, poet and playwright, and her mother Sofiia Starytska, was an activist, entrepreneur and actress. Starytska-Cherniakhivska was the younger sister of the actress and director Mariia Starytska, and the older sister of Oksana Steshenko (1875–1941), a writer, translator, and educator, through whom she later became the sister-in-law of Ivan Steshenko.

Starytska-Cherniakhivska's paternal uncle was the composer, pianist, conductor and ethnomusicologist Mykola Lysenko. Starytska-Cherniakhivska grew up in an atmosphere of appreciation of the arts and national values.

Starytska-Cherniakhivska was educated at the First Private Women's Gymnasium (Note: Also referred to as the Vera Vashchenko-Zakharchenko Gymnasium.) in Kyiv.

In 1888, Starytska-Cherniakhivska joined the "Pleiada" literary group. In 1919, Starytska-Cherniakhivska co-founded and was appointed the deputy president of the National Council of Ukrainian Women.

During 1923 to 1924 Starytska-Cherniakhivska was a member of the Aspys literary society.

== Arrests ==
In autumn 1929, Starytska-Cherniakhivska's daughter Veronika Chernyakhivska was arrested as part of the Union for the Freedom of Ukraine trial. Chernyakhivska was later released in January 1930 due to lack of evidence. Starytska-Cherniakhivska and Oleksandr Chernyakhivsky were then arrested and later convicted as part of the same show trail. Starytska-Cherniakhivska served a suspended sentence in Stalino (present-day Donetsk).

In August 1989, Starytska-Cherniakhivska was posthumously rehabilitated by the Supreme Court of the Ukrainian SSR.

=== NKVD arrest and death ===
On 20 July 1941, Starytska-Cherniakhivska and her sister Oksana Steshenko were arrested by the NKVD. Starytska-Cherniakhivska and Steshenko were taken to Kharkiv where they were charged with carrying out anti-Soviet activity under Article 54 of the Criminal Code of the Ukrainian SSR. Both sisters were then transported via Stolypin wagon to the Kazakh SSR. Starytska-Cherniakhivska died during the journey, and her dead body was thrown from the train at an unknown location.

== Personal life ==
Starytska-Cherniakhivska was married to Oleksandr Chernyakhivsky (1869–1939), a physician.

Chernyakhivsky and Starytska-Cherniakhivska had one daughter, the poet and translator Veronika Chernyakhivska. In 1938, as part of the Great Purge, Chernyakhivska was arrested and subsequently executed on 22 September 1938 in Kyiv.

== Major works ==
Liudmyla Starytska-Cherniakhivska wrote poetry, prose, drama, memoirs and literary criticism for various publications including the Lviv almanac, Pershyi Vinok.

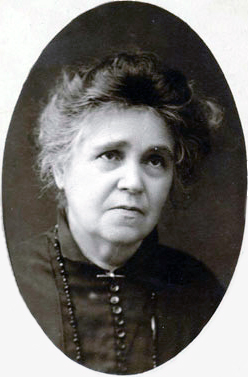
Liudmyla Starytska-Cherniakhivska

=== Dramatic works ===
1913 – Wings ('Kryla')

1917 – The Last Sheaf ('Ostanniy snip')

1918 – Hetman Petro Doroshenko

1926 – Bandit Karmeliuk ('Rozbiynyk Karmeliuk')

1927 – Ivan Mazepa

=== Memoirs ===
Liudmyla Starytska-Cherniakhivska's memoirs include:

- Twenty-Five Years of Ukrainian Theatre. Reflections and Thoughts (Dvadtsiat pyat rokiv ukrainskoho teatru. Spohady ta dumky)
- Minutes of Lesia Ukrainka's Life (Khvylyny zhyttia Lesi Ukrainky)
- Recollections about M. Lysenko (Spohady pro M. Lysenka)
- V. Samiylenko. In Memory of a Friend (V. Samiylenko. Pamyati tovarysha)

=== Other literary works ===
1893 – Before the Storm (Pered bureiu), is a historical novel, which was published in instalments in Pravda, Lviv journal, during 1893–1894. The author never finished the novel.

1899 – The Living Grave ('Zhyva Mohyla') was Liudmyla Starytska-Cherniakhivska's first major work. The novel was published in Kyivan Antiquity journal. The topic of the novel is the love of two young people. The story is intertwined with the elements of Ukrainian folklore and legends. There is some parallel between The Living Grave and Shakespeare's Romeo and Juliet along with Gottfried August Bürger's Lenore. The novel is also a fine representative piece of Ukrainian Romanticism and reminiscent of such earlier Ukrainian Romantic works as Levko Borovykovskyi's ballad Marusia (1829) and Mykola Hohol's (Nikolai Gogol) long tale A Terrible Vengeance (1831–32).

In 2015 Sova Books published its English translation of The Living Grave. One of the interesting facts about the publication is that on its cover the book depicts Daryna, the main heroine of the story and as a little tribute to the author of the story the publisher reproduced her face relying on one of Liudmyla Starytska-Cherniakhivska's photographs.

1929 – Diamond Ring ('Diamantovyi persten') was finished by the author six weeks before her first arrest. The manuscript remained unpublished for 64 years, until it appeared in Zona journal in 1993.
