= Steshenko =

Steshenko (Ukrainian: Стешенко) is a Ukrainian surname. Notable people with the surname include:

- Aida Steshenko (born 1968), Turkmenistan table tennis player
- Ivan Steshenko (1873–1918), Ukrainian activist and writer
- Oksana Steshenko, Ukrainian writer and teacher
