= Oksana Steshenko =

Ukrainian writer (1875-1942)

- Оксана Стешенко
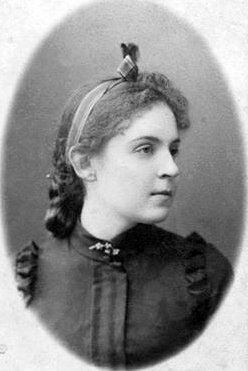
- Steshenko in 1891
- Born: Оксана Михайлівна Старицька; Oksana Mykhailivna Starytska; 24 January [O.S. 12 January] 1875; Karpivka, Kremenchugsky Uyezd, Poltava Governorate, Russian Empire
- Died: 1942 (aged 66–67); Kazakh SSR, USSR
- Education: Lysenko Music and Drama School, 1907
- Occupations: Children's writer; poet; playwright
- Spouse: Ivan Steshenko (m. 1897; died 1918)
- Children: 2 including, Yaroslav Steshenko
- Parents: Mykhailo Starytsky (father); Sofiia Starytska (mother)
- Relatives: Mariia Starytska (sister); Liudmyla Starytska-Cherniakhivska (sister); Veronika Chernyakhivska (niece); Mykola Lysenko (uncle)

Oksana Mykhailivna Steshenko (née Starytska; Ukrainian: Оксана Михайлівна Стешенко; 24 January [O.S. 12 January] 1875 – 1942) was a Ukrainian and Soviet children's writer, translator and teacher. Steshenko died during imprisonment in a gulag camp in the Kazakh SSR.

== Early life and education ==
Oksana Mykhailivna Starytska was born on 24 January [O.S. 12 January] 1875 in the village of Karpivka, Kremenchugsky Uyezd (present-day Ukraine) to a Ukrainian intelligentsia family. Steshenko's father, Mykhailo Starytsky, was a writer, poet and playwright, and her mother Sofiia Starytska, was an activist, entrepreneur and actress. Steshenko was one of five children, and was the younger sister of the actress and director Mariia Starytska, and the writer, translator, and literary critic Liudmyla Starytska-Cherniakhivska.

In 1892, Steshenko graduated from the First Private Women's Gymnasium (Note: Also referred to as the Vera Vashchenko-Zakharchenko Gymnasium.) and later graduated from the Lysenko Music and Drama School in 1907.

== Career ==
From 1888 to 1893, Steshenko was a member of the "Pleiada" literary group alongside her sister Liudmyla Starytska-Cherniakhivska and her future husband Ivan Steshenko.

In August 1898, Steshenko and her now husband Ivan Steshenko took part in the congress of the illegal society Young Ukraine (Ukrainian: Молода Україна).

From 1908 onwards Steshenko was a member of the Ukrainian Club and it successor Rodyna (Ukrainian: Родина), until it was outlawed in 1918.

In 1917, Steshenko began working for the Ministry of Education of the Ukrainian People's Republic department of extracurricular education. Steshenko also taught at the 1st Ukrainian Gymnasium in Kyiv.

In 1939, Steshenko was accepted into the National Writers' Union of Ukraine.

Steshenko translated Russian literature into Ukrainian.

== Arrests ==
=== Russian Empire ===
In 1897, aged 22, Steshenko was imprisoned for participating in a demonstration protesting the death of Mariia Vetrova. Imprisoned for two weeks at Lukyanivska Prison, Steshenko was housed in a cell next to Ivan Steshenko. During this time the two declared their love for each and agreed to get married upon their release.

Steshenko was released under a "wolf's ticket", which placed her under public supervision for two years and prohibited her from teaching or from working in university towns.

=== NKVD arrest and death ===
On 20 July 1941, Steshenko and her sister Liudmyla Starytska-Cherniakhivska were arrested by the NKVD. Steshenko and Starytska-Cherniakhivska were taken to Kharkiv where they were charged with carrying out anti-Soviet activity under Article 54 of the Criminal Code of the Ukrainian SSR. Both sisters were then transported via Stolypin wagon to the Kazakh SSR. Starytska-Cherniakhivska died during the journey, and her dead body was thrown from the train.

In 1942 (Note: Also cited as 1941.) Steshenko died at a gulag camp. The location of Steshenko's grave is unknown.

== Personal life ==
In 1897, Steshenko married Ivan Steshenko. Together they had two children the bibliographer Yaroslav Steshenko and the actress Iryna Steshenko.
