= Poltava electoral district =

Constituency of the Russian Republic

Poltava
- Former Civilian constituency for the All-Russian Constituent Assembly
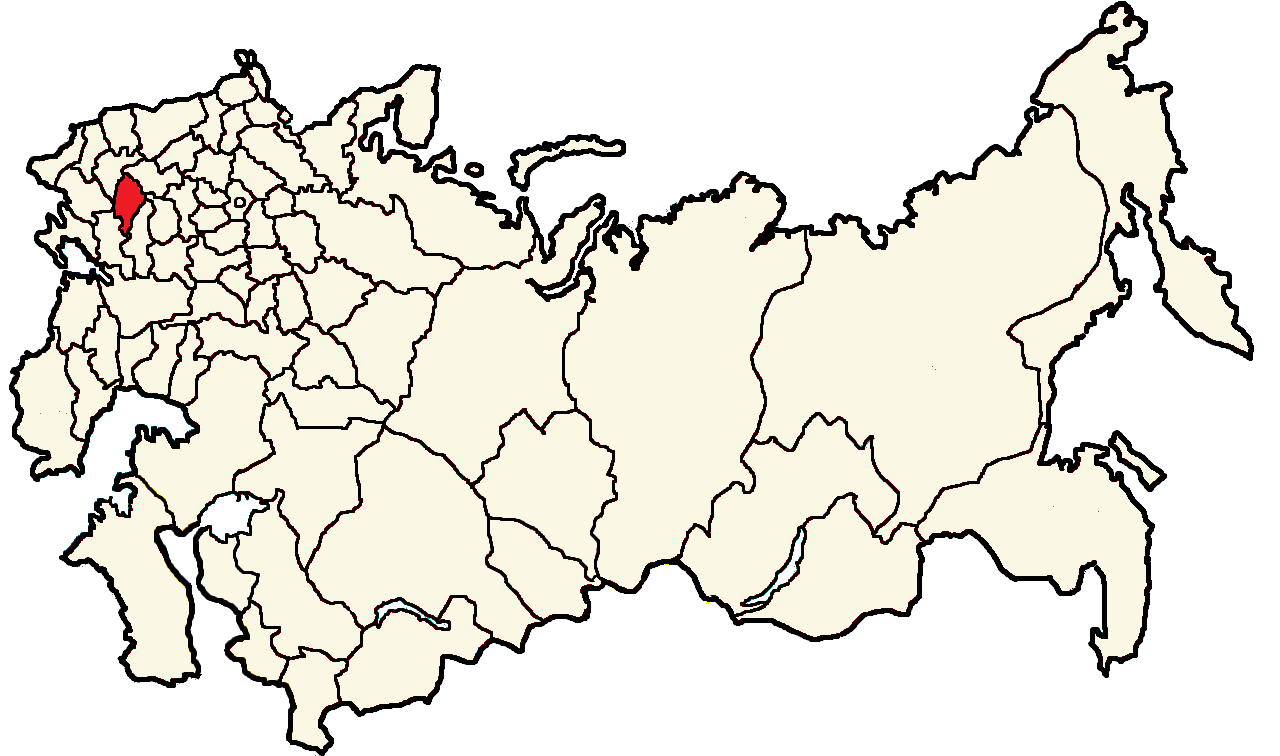

Former constituency
- Created: 1917
- Abolished: 1918
- Number of members: 15
- Number of Uyezd Electoral Commissions: 15
- Number of Urban Electoral Commissions: 2
- Number of Parishes: 262

The Poltava electoral district (Russian: Полтавский избирательный округ) was a constituency created for the 1917 Russian Constituent Assembly election.

The electoral district covered the Poltava Governorate. Poltava was an agrarian province. Voter turnout was reported at 74%.

The Russian SRs (dominated by the left) ran a joint list with the Ukrainian SRs (also dominated by its leftist faction). The Selianska Spilka ('Village Union'), the agrarian wing of the Ukrainian SRs, confronted the Farmers (Landowners) Party, excluding Landowners from local election commissions. The campaign against the Landowners Party occasionally took a violent shape.

The lists of the Folkspartey and the Jewish National Electoral Committee formed an electoral bloc, likewise the Poalei Zion and the United Socialist Jewish Workers Party lists formed an electoral bloc. Three minor Ukrainian lists formed an electoral bloc: the Ukrainian Social Democrats and the Ukrainian Socialist-Federalists and the Ukrainian National Republican Group. The large number of Jewish refugees, who had been displaced from other areas of the Pale of Settlement during World War I, would have contributed to the political diversity of Jewish candidatures.

In Poltava town, the Kadet list got the highest vote number (4,345 votes), followed by SRs, the Jewish list, the Ukrainian SRs and the Bolsheviks respectively.

== Results ==
Poltava
Party	Vote	%
List 8 - Ukrainian Socialist-Revolutionaries and Selianska Spilka	727,247	63.28
List 17 - Socialist-Revolutionaries and Ukrainian Socialist-Revolutionaries	198,437	17.27
List 12 - Bolsheviks	64,460	5.61
List 2 - Farmer-Owners	61,115	5.32
List 15 - Ukrainian Social Democrats	22,613	1.97
List 3 - Kadets	18,105	1.58
List 6 - Jewish National Electoral Committee	13,722	1.19
List 9 - Jewish List	12,100	1.05
List 13 - Ukrainian Socialist-Federalists	9,092	0.79
List 1 - Folkspartey	6,448	0.56
List 10 - Mensheviks, Bund, Polish Unity	5,993	0.52
List 14 - Popular Socialists and Cooperativists	4,391	0.38
List 5 - List without title	1,657	0.14
List 7 - United Jewish Socialist Labour Party (S.S. and E.S.)	1,482	0.13
List 11 - Ukrainian National Republican Group	1,070	0.09
List 4 - Poalei Zion	879	0.08
List 16 - Soviet of Peasants Deputies of Smenoi Rovno Village	445	0.04
Total:	1,149,256	

Deputies Elected
Kovalyov	Ukrainian SR-SR alliance
Poloz	Ukrainian SR-SR alliance
Terletsky	Ukrainian SR-SR alliance
Galagan	Ukrainian SR
Ivchenko	Ukrainian SR
Kovalenko	Ukrainian SR
Kovalevsky	Ukrainian SR
Kulichenko	Ukrainian SR
Petrenko	Ukrainian SR
Polotsky	Ukrainian SR
Semenyaga	Ukrainian SR
Sten'ka	Ukrainian SR
Stepanenko	Ukrainian SR
Yanko	Ukrainian SR
