= Stolypin (disambiguation) =

Stolypin may refer to:

- Pyotr Stolypin (1862–1911), Prime Minister of Russian, leader of the third Duma (1906–1911)
- Stolypin reform, a series of changes to Imperial Russia's agricultural sector instituted during the leadership of Pyotr Stolypin
- Stolypin's necktie redirects to Pyotr Stolypin
- Stolypin car, a type of railroad carriage in the Russian Empire and Soviet Union
- Stolypin Medal, an award of the Russian government introduced in 2008
