= Anton Prykhodko =

Ukrainian Soviet statesman

Ukrainian SSR Ambassador to USSR
- In office 1922–1924
- Preceded by: Mykhailo Poloz
- Succeeded by: Daniil Petrovskii

Personal details
- Born: July 21 [O.S. July 9] 1891 Kuban Oblast, Tikhoretsky District, Novorozhdestvenskaya, Russian Empire
- Died: January 29, 1938 Arkhangelsk, Russian SFSR, USSR

Anton (Antin) Terentiiovych Prykhodko (Ukrainian: Антін Терентійович Приходько; July 21 [O.S. July 9] 1891 – January 29, 1938, Arkhangelsk) was a Ukrainian Soviet statesman, born in Kuban Oblast, Tikhoretsky District, stanitsa (Cossack village) Novorozhdestvenskaya. He was the Permanent Representative of Ukrainian SSR to the Government of the USSR. He was also the member of VUTsVK.

== Biography ==
In 1907 — Attended Ukrainian Socialist circle of the high school of Stavropol

Graduated from Stavropol Teacher Seminary

In 1915 — MGU student and Esers' group member

From 1916 — USRP member under the nickname "Professor"

In 1917 (before October Revolution) — First time arrived to Ukrainian land (to Kyiv)

In 1917 —Candidate for members of UCA from USRP with participation of Ukrainian Peasant Union in Poltava constituency

January 16, 1918 — Arrested together with almost all leaders of left USRP group

From June 1918 — CP(B)U member

April 29, 1919 — Applied for withdrawal from USRP Central Committee

1919–1920 — UCP (borotbists) secretary

June 1919 — UCP (borotbists) Central Committee cashier

1920-1929 — chairman of the board of State Publishing House of Ukraine

1920–1930 — Secretary of Central Commission of Ukrainization of Soviet apparatus under Council of People's Commissars of the Ukrainian SSR

In 1921

- member of editorial board of critical-bibliographic journal "Voice of Press"
- headed All-Ukrainian Publishing Commission under Council of People's Commissars of the Ukrainian SSR
- member of VI membership of VUTsVK

End of 1921 – May 1922 — Commissioner from the Poltava Governorate during the mobilization to prepare the sowing campaign in Ukraine

May 1922 – November 1924 — Permanent Representative of Ukrainian SSR to the Government of the USSR (see List of ambassadors of Ukraine to Russia)

September 12, 1922 – Enrolled in 1st course of Karl Marx Moscow Institute of the National Economy

December 1924 – April 1926 — Adviser to the Permanent Representation of the USSR in Czechoslovakia

January 27, 1926 - 1927 — Deputy Commissar of Education of Ukrainian SSR Alexander Shumsky

1926 -1930 — Deputy General Prosecutor of Ukrainian SSR

1926 — Member of the State Spelling Commission

1927 – December 25, 1929 — Deputy Commissar of Education of Ukrainian SSR Mykola Skrypnyk

May 25 – June 3, 1927 — Conference Member to discuss the draft spelling

1928 — Member of the Presidium of the State Spelling Commission

August 9, 1929 — He had a party ticket number #0751622 and was recognized as proven by the results of the meeting of the Verification Commission of the Cell of CP(B)U in People's Commissariat for Education of Ukrainian SSR (Zhuravliovskiy district committee, Kharkiv)

March 9, 1930 – April 19, 1930 — Head of the Supreme Court of the Ukrainian SSR during Union for the Freedom of Ukraine process

In 1930–1931 — Executive editor of the journal "Bulletin of Soviet Justice"

In 1931–1933 — Executive editor of the journal "Revolutionary law"

Until December 31, 1933 — Chairman of the Arbitration Commission under Council of People's Commissars of the Ukrainian SSR

December 31, 1933

- Excluded from CP(B)U for insincerity in giving explanations to CP(B)U Central Control Commission about the connection with the counter-revolutionary, nationalist element
- Arrested by OGPU of USSR in Kharkiv (10 appt, 49 Pushkinskaya str.) as a member and leader of the Kharkiv terrorist organisation and a member of the counter-revolutionary Ukrainian rebel organisation that set as its goal the overthrow of Soviet power by force of arms

June 4, 1934 — Convicted for 10 years of corrective labor by judicial group of three of OGPU of USSR (Criminal Code of Ukrainian SSR, article 54-11)

July 1934 – End of 1936 — stayed on the island Vaigach (Amderma bay)

January – November 1937 — stayed at Chibyu

November 1937 — wrote the last letter to his wife (she received it January 1938)

December 21, 1937 — sentenced to capital punishment by troika of NKVD Directorate of Arkhangelskaya Oblast (Criminal Code of RSFSR, articles 58-10, 58–11)

January 29, 1938 — shot together with Ivan Shchepkin, Nikolay Muzychenko, and Vladimir Ivanov

December 6, 1957 — rehabilitated by the Military Court of the Kyiv Military District

== Writings ==
He wrote under a pseudonym "A. Pryideshnii".

1. What was the sea noisy about // Journal "Shliakhy Mystetstva". — 1921. — part 1. — pp. 31–32
2. The birth of the sun // Journal "Shliakhy Mystetstva". — 1921. — part 1. — pp. 32
3. Fatigue // Journal "Mystetstvo". — 1919. — #4. — pp. 13–14
4. Arrest of ten // Almanac "Zhshytky Borotby". — 1920. — pp. 34–55

== Articles ==
1. Cultural and educational issues at the Xth Congress of the CP(B)U // Bilshovyk Ukrayiny . — 1927. — #14. — pp. 17–26
2. SVU on school front // Shlyakh osvity. — 1931. — ##5–6. — pp. 82–90
3. General education in Ukraine // Radianska Osvita. — 1928. — #10. — pp. 1–15
4. Hnat Mykhailychenko // Hnat Mykhailychenko. Works of art — 1929. — pp. 5–15

== Personal life ==
July 22 [O.S. July 10] 1891 — was baptized at the Church of Our Lady of Kazan in stanitsa Novorozhdestvenskaya. At Baptism, he received the name in honor of Anthony of the Caves

He had brother Fedir Prykhodko

Winter 1918–1919 — was a guest at the wedding of Vasil Matena-Bugaievich (Chornyi) and Mariia Moskovets (sister of Yevhenia Moskovets) together with his wife, Maria (Marusia) Prykhodko (Bocharova). The wedding took place 24 Babichevskii lane (Zhelvakova str.), Poltava

March 2, 1920 – his wife, Maria Prykhodko, was a member of UCP (borotbists) and employee of its Central Committee

1926 – his wife, Maria Prykhodko, started to work as an announcer of All-Ukrainian Radio-broadcasting Committee

May 6, 1927 — lived at the address 5-room, 8 Sadovo-Kulikovskaya str.,

In 1929-1930 — lived at the address 1 Revoliutsii str., Kharkiv

1933 — lived at the address 10 appt., 49 Pushkinskaya str., Kharkiv ("Kommunar" building)

January 1934 – his wife, Maria Prykhodko, was fired from All-Ukrainian Radio-broadcasting Committee
