= Samoilenko =

Samoilenko or Samoylenko (Ukrainian: Самойленко) is a Ukrainian surname. Notable people with the surname include:

- Anatoly Samoilenko (1938–2020), Ukrainian mathematician
- Ihor Samoylenko (born 2002), Ukrainian footballer
- Illia Samoilenko (born 1994), Ukrainian soldier, taken prisoner after the Battle of Mariupol
- Petr Samoylenko (born 1977), Russian basketball player
- Vyacheslav Samoylenko (born 1992), Ukrainian footballer
