= Mykhailo Poloz =

Ukrainian-Soviet politician, diplomat, and statesman (1891–1937)

- Михайло Полоз
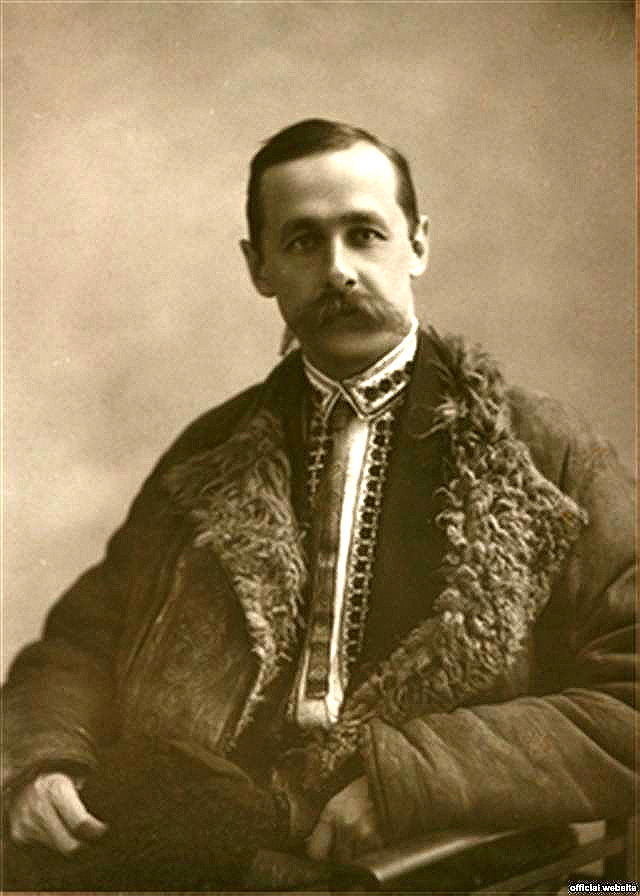
- Poloz in 1922

Member of the Central Executive Committee of the Soviet Union
- In office 1930–1934

Ambassador of the Ukrainian SSR to the Russian SFSR
- In office 1921–1922
- Preceded by: Position established
- Succeeded by: Anton Prykhodko

People's Secretary for Finance of the Ukrainian SSR
- In office 1925–1931
- Preceded by: Stepan Kuznyetsov
- Succeeded by: Oleksandr Rekis

Personal details
- Born: 23 December 1891 Kharkiv, Kharkov Governorate, Russian Empire (now Ukraine)
- Died: 3 November 1937 (aged 45) Sandarmokh, Karelian ASSR, Russian SFSR, Soviet Union (now Republic of Karelia, Russia)
- Party: Communist Party of the Soviet Union (1920–1937)
- Other political affiliations: Ukrainian Socialist-Revolutionary Party (1917–1918); Borotbists (1918–1920)
- Education: Moscow City Shanyavsky National University

Mykhailo Mykolayovych Poloz (Ukrainian: Миха́йло Микола́йович По́лоз; 23 December 1891 – 3 November 1937) was a Ukrainian and Soviet politician, diplomat, and statesman, and a participant at the Treaty of Brest-Litovsk.

== Biography ==
Mykhailo Poloz was born on 23 December 1891 in Kharkiv, in the Kharkov Governorate of the Russian Empire into a noble family of excise officials. Upon graduation from a realschule, Poloz studied at the Shanyavsky Moscow City People's University (1910–12) and the Petrovskaya-Rozumovskaya Agricultural Academy (1912–15). During World War I in 1915, he underwent training at a flying school and as a praporshchik (warrant officer) and he fought on the Romanian Front.

In 1906, Poloz had become a member of the Kharkiv Student Union of Socialist-Revolutionaries and by 1908 he was arrested for the first time. In 1917 as a member of the Ukrainian Party of Socialist Revolutionaries, Poloz was elected to the Central Council of Ukraine, he was a member of the Ukrainian Military General Committee and he took part in the peace delegation of Ukraine to the Brest-Litovsk treaty negotiations. In 1918, during the advance of Muravyov's Soviet forces, he was arrested again for collaborating with the Bolsheviks and sentenced to be shot, but was rescued by Cossacks.

Being a member of the UPSR's left faction after its split, Poloz joined the Ukrainian Communist Party of Borotbists as one of its leaders. During the Skoropadsky administration, Poloz worked underground preparing for the anti-Hetman uprising. In 1920, he joined the Communist Party of Ukraine.

With the establishment of the Soviet regime, Poloz worked in the presidium of the Ukrainian Council of National Economy and headed the administrative-financial commission at the Council of People's Commissars of the Ukrainian SSR. In 1921, Poloz became the plenipotentiary representative of the Ukrainian SSR in Moscow (1921–23). He thereafter headed the Gosplan of Ukraine (1923–25) and the People's Commissariat of Finance (1925–30). From 1930 to 1934, Poloz was a Deputy Chairman of the Budget Commission of the Central Executive Committee of the Soviet Union.

As an aviation specialist, Poloz laid the foundations for the development of civil aviation in Ukraine. From 24 December 1927, he headed the Ukrainian committee for the protection of natural landmarks. In that position, Poloz did much for the protection of cultural and natural landmarks.

On 12 January 1934, Poloz was arrested in Moscow by State Political Directorate agents. An investigation was conducted at first in Moscow. The case was then transferred to Kharkiv and later to Kyiv. On 4 June 1934, Poloz was found guilty of links with the Ukrainian Military Organization (UVO) and sentenced to 10 years in the Gulag. On 9 October 1937, an NKVD troika sentenced Poloz to capital punishment (Vysshaya Mera Nakazaniya (VMN) in Russian). On 3 November 1937, Poloz was shot in the Sandarmokh forest in the Karelian ASSR.

On 8 March 1957, Poloz was rehabilitated.
