= Ivan Steshenko =

Ukrainian politician, writer, and academic (1873–1918)

- Іван Стешенко
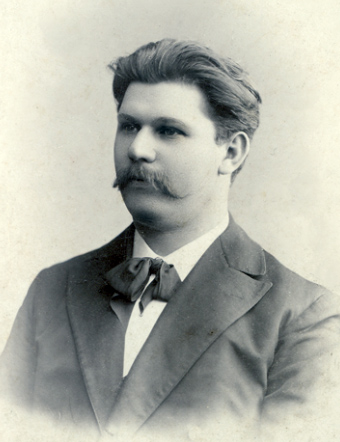
- Steshenko in the 1890s

Minister of Education
- In office 28 June 1917 – 30 January 1918
- Prime Minister: Volodymyr Vynnychenko
- Preceded by: Position established
- Succeeded by: Nykyfor Hryhoriiv

Personal details
- Born: 24 June [O.S. 12 June] 1873 Poltava, Poltava Governorate, Russian Empire (now Ukraine)
- Died: 1 August 1918 (aged 45) Poltava, Poltava Governorate, Ukrainian People's Republic
- Cause of death: Assassination
- Resting place: Baikove Cemetery
- Party: Social-democratic club, Hromada, Society of Ukrainian Progressionists, USDRP
- Spouse: Oksana Steshenko (m. 1897)
- Children: 2 including, Yaroslav Steshenko
- Relatives: Mykhailo Starytsky (father-in-law); Mariia Starytska (sister-in-law); Liudmyla Starytska-Cherniakhivska (sister-in-law); Veronika Chernyakhivska (niece)
- Education: Saint Vladimir Imperial University of Kiev, 1896
- Occupation: Politician; literary scholar; poet; writer; translator
- Writing career
- Pen name: I. Serdeshny; I. Sichovyk; I. Svitlenko; I. Stepura

Signature
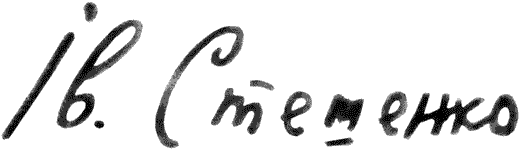

Ivan Matviiovych Steshenko (Ukrainian: Іван Матвійович Стешенко; 24 June [O.S. 12 June] 1873 – 1 August 1918) was a Ukrainian politician, literary scholar, poet, writer, translator and member of the Shevchenko Scientific Society. Steshenko's assassination was one of the first political murders in Ukraine.

== Biography ==
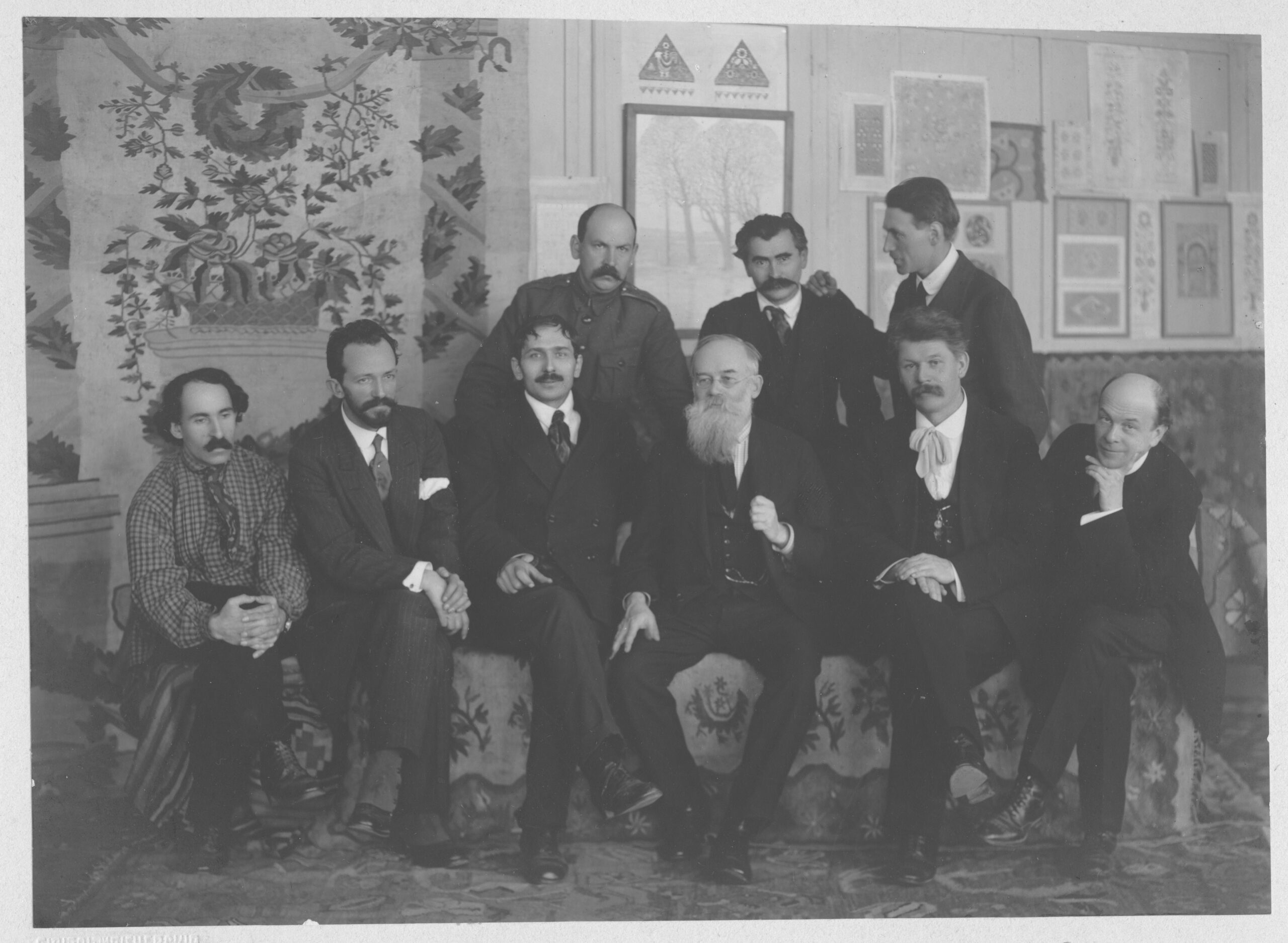
Founders of the Ukrainian academy of arts, 1917: Sitting: Abram Manevich, Oleksandr Murashko, Fedir Krychevsky, Mykhailo Hrushevsky, Ivan Steshenko, Mykola Burachek. Standing: Heorhiy Narbut, Vasyl Krychevsky, Mykhailo Boychuk.

Steshenko studied in Saint Vladimir Imperial University of Kiev from 1892 to 1896. At that time he was an active member of the Literary Hromada of Kiev. Steshenko was publishing his works in various Lviv periodicals: Pravda, Zoria, and Dzvinok. After graduating from the Department of History and Philosophy in 1896, he worked as a teacher in women's school, gymnasium. In politics he became influenced by Mykhailo Drahomanov and Mykola Kovalevsky. Later together with other activists such as Lesia Ukrainka he formed the Ukrainian social-democratic club (circle). At about that time he wrote his drama Mazepa. After all this he was put in prison in 1897 for four months, following exile from Kiev and prohibition of teaching. That forced him to go into intense writing. At that time he was preparing the Ukrainian dictionary, wrote a book about Kotliarevsky's work (1898), and its own poetry collections such as Khutorni Sonety (Farmstead sonnets, 1899) and Steppovi Motyvy (Steppe Motifs, 1900). He also was publishing various articles in the newspaper Kievskaya Starina.

Upon returning to Kiev, he became the leader of the Hromada society and worked closely with the Society of Ukrainian Progressionists. He also became a secretary of the Kiev Literary-Artistic Society before it was closed in 1905. At about that time he published the biography of Kotliarevsky (1902) and was co-publisher of a magazine Shershen (1905). After he was reinstated as a teacher in 1906, from 1907 to 1917 he was teaching literature in the First Commercial School in Kiev and Lysenko Music and Drama School. During that time he was also a secretary and a deputy-chairman of the Ukrainian Scientific Society. In 1913–14 he was an editor for the Kiev monthly periodical Siayvo, and in 1908 he published a history of Ukrainian drama.

After the October Revolution he was elected as the member of the Kiev Civic Executive Committee and the Tsentralna Rada. Steshenko also was one of the founders of the Society of School Education. Later he was appointed first as the Secretary and then as the Minister of Education. Steshenko also founded the State Academy of Arts.

Steshenko wrote under the pen names I. Serdeshny, I. Sichovyk, I. Svitlenko and I. Stepura.

Out of his translations were works of Ovid, Friedrich Schiller, Alexander Pushkin, Lord Byron, and others.

== Assassination ==
On the night of either 29 July or 30 July 1918, Steshenko and his son Yaroslav Steshenko travelled from Kyiv to Poltava. Arriving at Poltava-Kyivska railway station, and unable to find a coachman, the pair decided to walk to their destination. Whilst walking Steshenko and his son were accosted by two unknown assailants who fatally shot Steshenko twice in the head before fleeing the scene. Steshenko died from his injuries on the 1 August 1918.

Steshenko's assassination was one of the first political murders in Ukraine. Steshenko was buried in the Baikove Cemetery in Kiev.

On December 20, 1923, Serhiy Yefremov while on the way to Poltava wrote in his diary: "I just found out from Kost Ivanovych [Tovkach] scary details about the murder of Steshenko. He was charged to be killed by the regional Bolshevik organization of the Zinkiv Povit, and was executed by one of the members of the organization. His name's Bashlovka. The reason why Steshenko was sentenced to be executed is unknown."

=== Bolshevik involvement ===
Suspensions of Bolshevik involvement was later confirmed in 1941 when Steshenko's widow Oksana Steshenko and her sister Liudmyla Starytska-Cherniakhivska were arrested by the NKVD. The arrest warrant for Oksana Steshenko noted that Steshenko had been assassinated by members of the Red Army.

== Personal life ==
In 1897, Steshenko married Oksana Steshenko, a children's writer, poet and playwright. Together they had two children the bibliographer Yaroslav Steshenko and the actress Iryna Steshenko.

Through marriage Steshenko was the son-in-law of Mykhailo Starytsky and Sofiia Starytska, and was the brother-in-law of Mariia Starytska and Liudmyla Starytska-Cherniakhivska. Steshenko was the uncle of Veronika Chernyakhivska.

Preceded by introduced	Secretary of Education; Minister of Education; June 1917 – January 1918	Succeeded by N. Hryhoriiv
