= Mykhailo Starytsky =

Ukrainian writer (1840–1904)

- Михайло Старицький
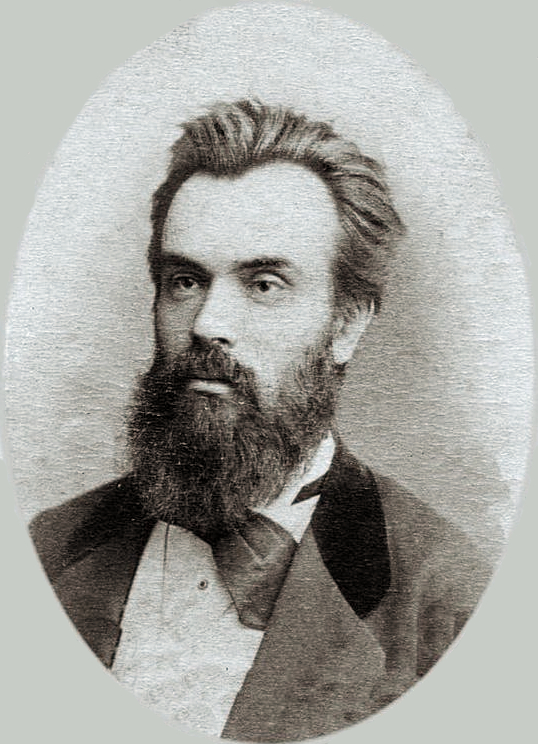
- Starytsky in the 1870s
- Born: 14 December [O.S. 2 December] 1840; Klishchyntsi, Poltava Governorate, Russian Empire
- Died: 27 April [O.S. 14 April] 1904 (aged 63); Kyiv, Kiev Governorate, Russian Empire
- Resting place: Baikove Cemetery
- Occupations: Writer; poet; playwright
- Spouse: Sofiia Starytska (m. 1863)
- Children: 5, including Mariia, Liudmyla, and Oksana
- Relatives: Ivan Steshenko (son-in-law); Mykola Lysenko (cousin)
- Writing career
- Language: Ukrainian, Russian
- Genres: Opera; drama; poetry; historical novel; adventure novel
- Notable works: What a Moonlit Night; Chasing two Hares

Mykhailo Petrovych Starytsky (Ukrainian: Михайло Петрович Старицький, [mɪˈxai̯lɔ stɐˈrɪt͡sʲkɪi̯]; 14 November [O.S. 2 November] 1840 – 27 April [O.S. 14 April] 1904) was a Ukrainian writer, poet, and playwright, known as one of the founders of Ukrainian professional theatre.

== Biography ==
Mykhailo Starytsky was born on 14 December [O.S. 2 December] 1840 in the village of Klishchyntsi, Poltava Governorate (present-day Cherkasy Oblast, Zolotonosha Raion) to Petro Starytsky (Ukrainian: Петро Старицький), a retired cavalry officer, and Anastasia Lysenko (Ukrainian: Анастасія Захарівна). Starytsky's mother was a member of the Lysenko (Лисенки) family, an old Ukrainian Cossack starshyna family.

Starytsky's father died in 1845 and his mother died in 1852, when Starytsky was 12 years old. Starytsky was subsequently raised by the Lysenko family alongside his maternal cousin Mykola Lysenko, with whom he became good friends. Starytsky was educated at a gymnasium in Poltava, Starytsky enjoyed reading works on military history and adventure stories. During that time he was especially influenced by the historical novel Black Council by Panteleimon Kulish. He also developed a fascination with theatre.

After finishing the gymnasium, Starytsky started his studies at Kharkiv University before transferring to Saint Volodymyr University in Kyiv. During his student years he participated in the activities of Kyiv Hromada together with Mykola Lysenko, Mykhailo Drahomanov and Volodymyr Antonovych. During the early 1860s he taught at Sunday schools and engaged in ethnographic research, which later became the base for a number of his works. However, Mykhailo was unable to finish studying due to illness and family issues.

After his marriage in 1863, Starytsky's financial state suffered a serious decline, and he was forced to support himself and his family by working at the archive of Kyiv University. This allowed him to gain access to valuable documents related to the history of Cossacks and Haidamaks, including the times of Bohdan Khmelnytsky, which influenced his literary activities.

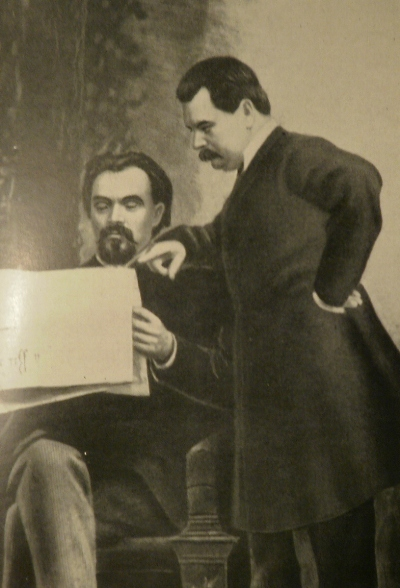
Starytsky and Kropyvnytsky in Odesa, 1884

In 1864 Starytsky and Lysenko started to work on their first opera Harkusha, based on a story by Oleksa Storozhenko. The play, although never finished, signified the beginning of cooperation between Starytskyi as librettist and Lysenko as composer. In 1874 their musical comedy Christmas Eve, based on a work by Nikolai Gogol, debuted at the Kyiv theatre, with Starytsky debuting as director. The play was panned by the Russian press for alleged "separatism" and led to an investigation against its authors. Despite pressure from the government, Starytsky started to organize a drama committee with the aim of organizing a professional Ukrainian theatre.

During the Russo-Turkish War Starytsky acquired a rusk factory and profited from supplying Russian troops, but failed to achieve much success in that business. His civic activities promoted the revival of Ukrainian national identity, but he avoided participation in radical political movements. Nevertheless, on one occasion Starytskys' Kyiv residence was searched by gendarmes in connection with the assassination of an officer by a revolutionary terrorist. The victim of the crime turned out to be a close friend of Starytsky from the time of his studies in gymnasium. Following that event Mykhailo and his wife had to leave Kyiv for two years.

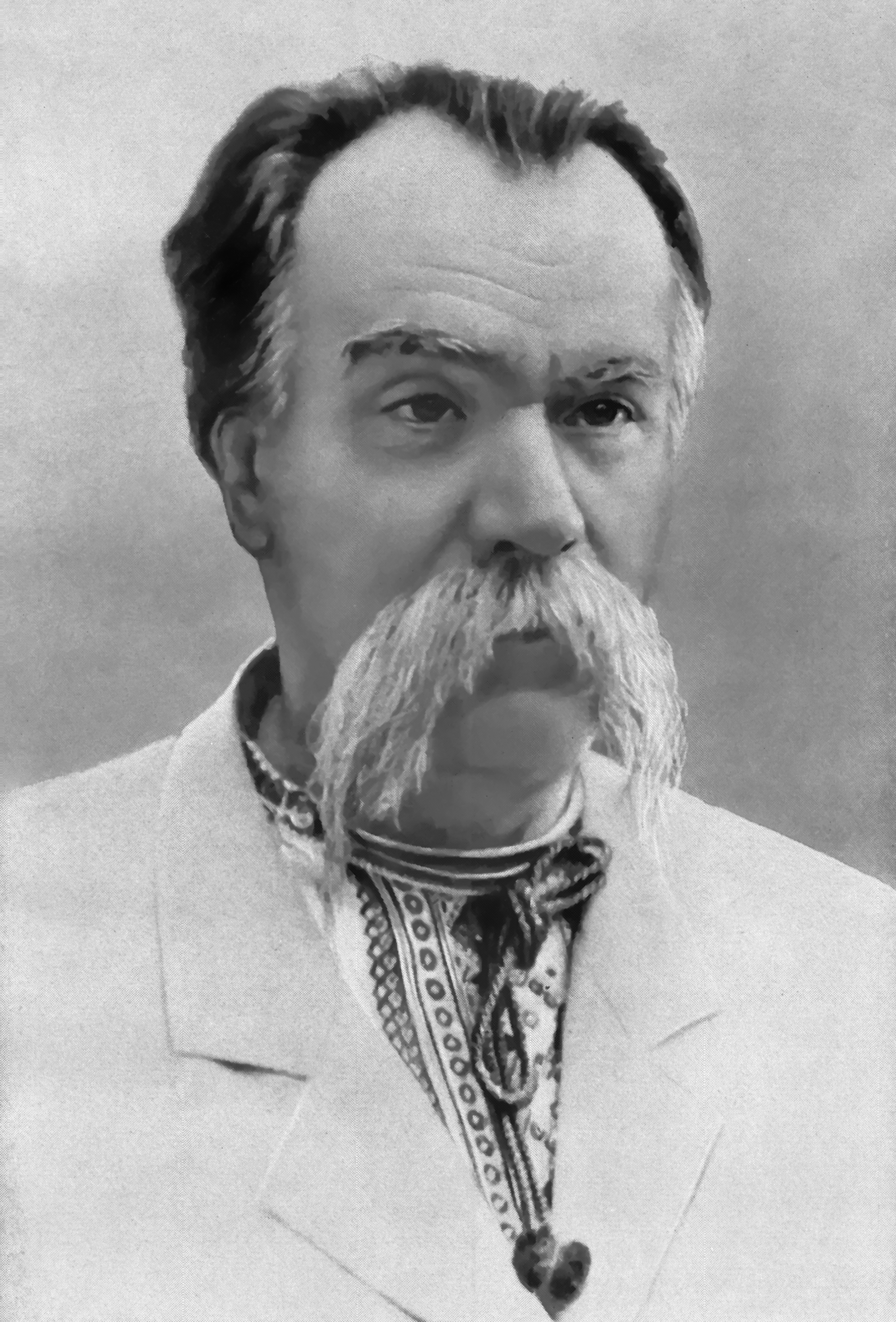
Starytsky during his later years, wearing a Ukrainian embroidered shirt

Following the success of Marko Kropyvnytsky's troupe, which brought to fame the young actress Maria Zankovetska, Starytsky invested money from the sale of his country residence, house and factory into the creation of his own theatre. During 1883-1884 he employed Kropyvnytsky, Ivan Karpenko-Karyi, Mykola Sadovskyi, Maria Zankovetska, Panas Saksahansky and several other actors. The troupe performed in Kyiv and visited Odesa. Administrative requirements of the time demanded Ukrainian plays to be followed by Russian ones, but the latter were rarely profitable. Authorities eventually banned the performance of Ukrainian theatres in the General Governorate of Kyiv, Volyn and Podillia, and in 1885 the troupe split.

Starytsky was known for kind treatment of his actors: for instance, he refused to cut their loans in case of illness and inability to perform. After 10 years Starytsky's troupe went bankrupt. Despite the lack of funds and poor health, he returned to theatre business by cooperating with other troupes in Kyiv, organized performances and co-authored books together with his daughter Liudmyla, which allowed him to earn for a living.

Mykhailo Starytsky died on 27 April [O.S. 14 April] 1904 in Kyiv and was buried at the Baikove Cemetery.

== Personal life ==
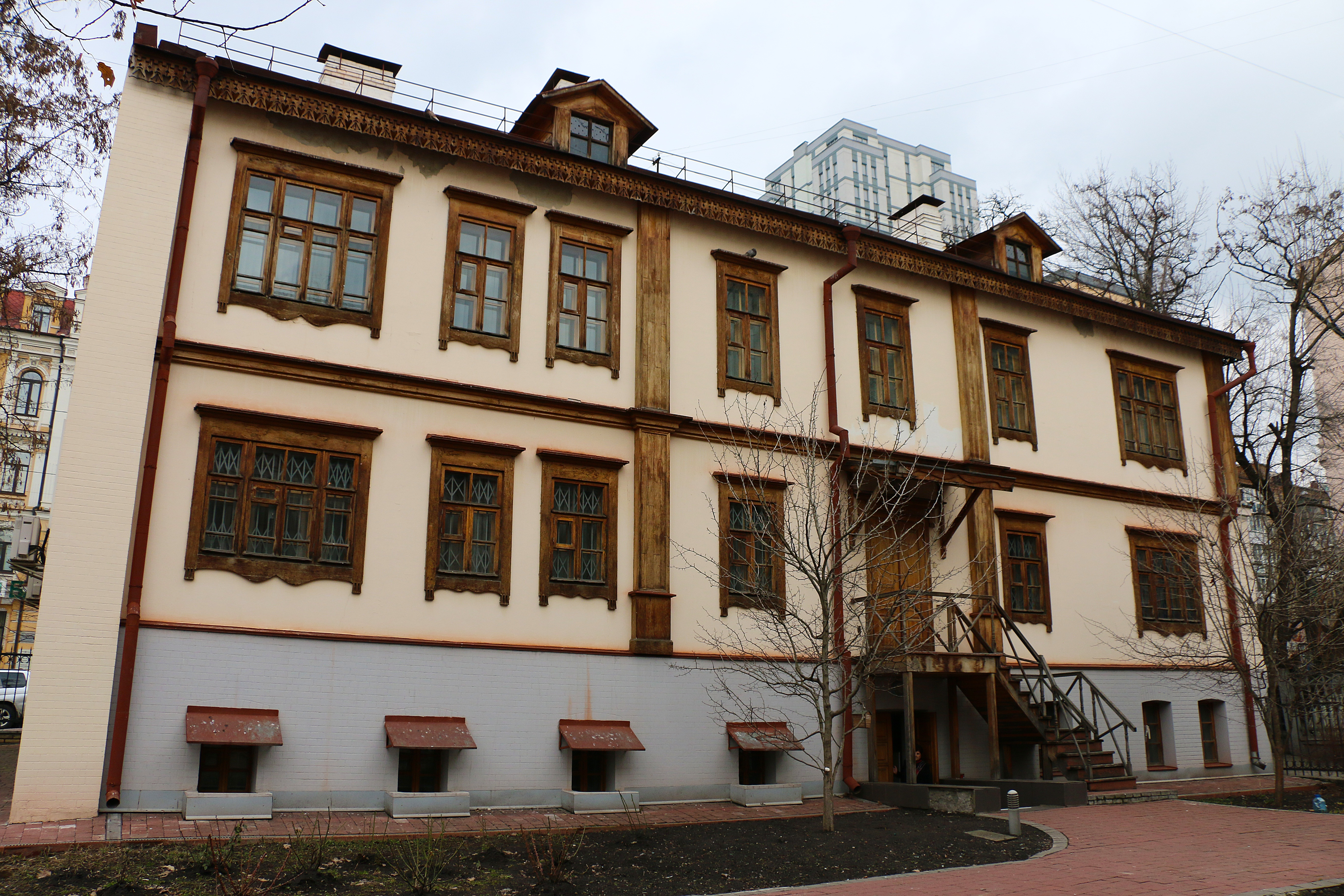
A house in which Starytsky resided in Kyiv, now a memorial

In autumn 1862 Starytsky, an avid hunter, went duck hunting near his residence in the region of Poltava, and fell ill with pneumonia. During his illness he was cared for by his aunt and her daughter Sofiia Starytska. After recuperating, Mykola asked for permission to marry his cousin, who was at the time only 14 years old. The marriage was allowed only after a special permission from an archimandrite, which was granted after Sofia's birth certificate had been forged by giving her age as 16. Despite this fact, the young couple became a happy and harmonious family: Starytska shared Mykhailo's interest for theatre and literature and made friends in his social circle.

The marriage produced five children:

- Mariia – actress, director, pedagogue and organizer of theatre
- Liudmyla – writer, author of memoirs, activist of the Ukrainian revolution
- Oksana – children's writer and activist, married to Ivan Steshenko
- Yuriy – lawyer and activist in Kyiv, head of the Committee on Refugees at the Interior Ministry in 1917–1919
- Olha – died in her childhood as a result of illness

Starytsky and his wife were frequently absent from home due to their professional and civic commitments. When the family was still able to spend time together, Mykhailo enjoyed reading books for his wife and children, told stories, played music and accompanied it with singing. Between 1860 and early 1880s the family would spend the time from early spring to late autumn at their summer residence in Podillia, where Mykhailo enjoyed hunting. Autumn and winter were spent by them in Kyiv, where they usually rented a flat.

== Works ==
During his career Starytsky created over 30 works of drama, as well as a number of poetry collections and around 200 translations. Among others, he was the first author to translate Shakespeare's Hamlet into Ukrainian. Starytsky wrote librettos, songs, stories, dramas, and poems. Later in life, Starytsky worked with Lysenko, collecting Ukrainian folk songs and transforming them into plays and operas for which Starytsky wrote the librettos (including Taras Bulba, an adaptation of the novel by Gogol). He eventually switched from writing scripts for theatre to writing books. Starytsky is currently remembered for his work with Lysenko, as well as his later poetry and novels.

=== Chasing two Hares (1883) ===
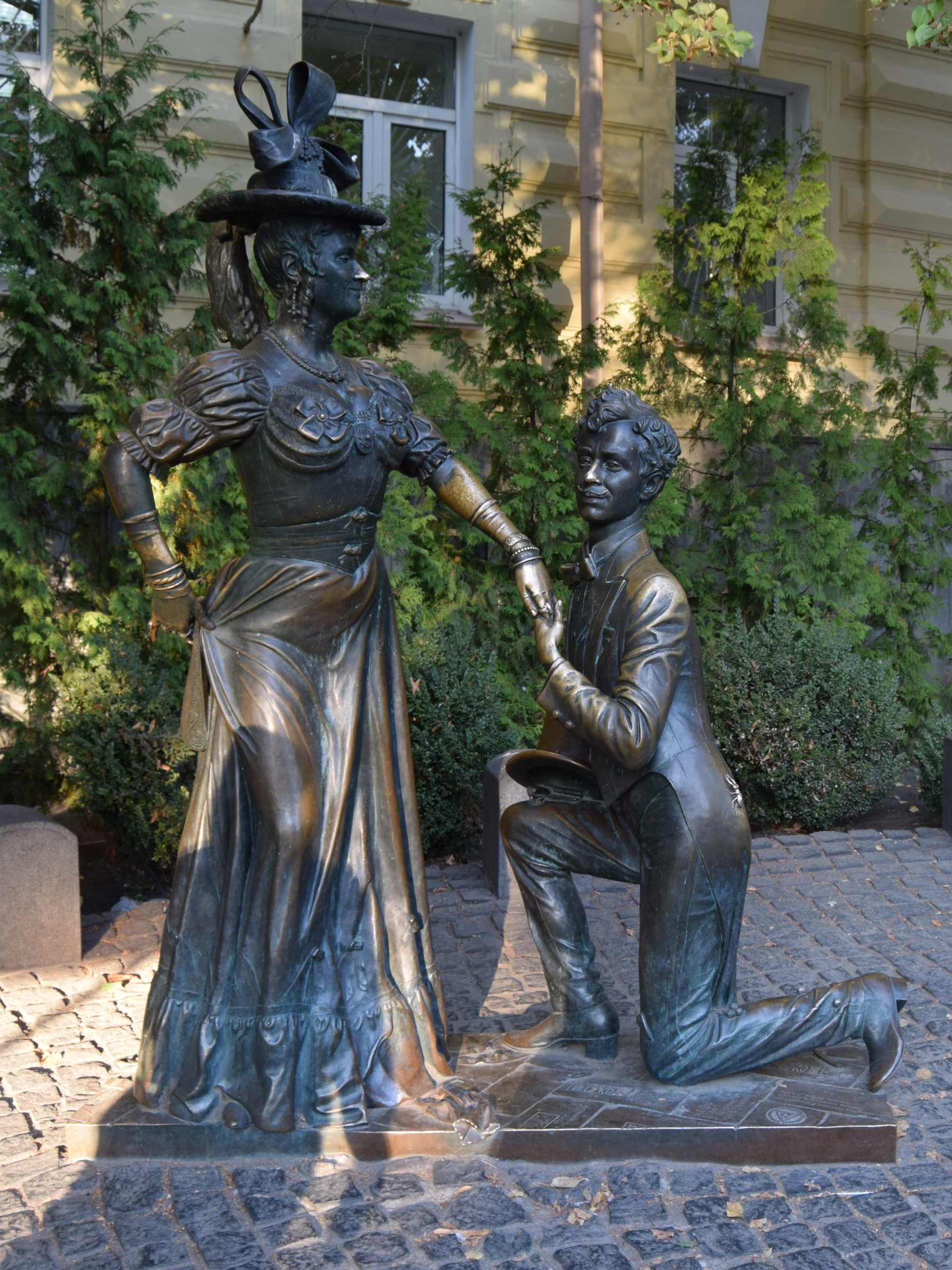
Monument to heroes of Starytsky's play in central Kyiv

Starytskyi is widely known for his 1883 comical play "Chasing two hares" (Ukrainian: За двома зайцями), which was created on the base of an 1875 comedy by Ivan Nechuy-Levytsky. A film adaptation of the play by Dovzhenko Film Studios premiered in 1961, becoming one of the most popular Ukrainian movies of the Soviet era. A monument to its heroes has been installed near Andriivskyi Descent in Kyiv, where main elements of the plot take place.

=== Bohdan Khmelnytsky (1897) ===
In 1887 Starytsky presented the first version of his drama about Bohdan Khmelnytsky, but it was immediately banned by censorship. In order to receive a permission to stage his work, in 1891 he translated it into Russian at the advice of Olena Pchilka, but the text failed to reach the censorship committee. In 1893 Starytsky attempted to contact notable actor Aleksandr Fedotov in order to promote the play in Saint Petersburg, but to no avail. In 1895 the work was once again banned from being staged.

After a number of corrections, which included the removal of particularly violent scenes and mentions of Ukrainian statehood, a new variant of the drama was permitted by censorship in 1897 and achieved great success. Costumes for the play were created in cooperation with historian Dmytro Yavornytsky, and the chief role was played by Mykola Sadovsky. Starytsky praised his work as the first "serious" Ukrainian historical drama, but in private corresondence with Ivan Franko claimed its final edition to be "crippled" by censorship. Later Starytsky would create a prose trilogy dedicated to Khmelnytsky, which saw its first publication in Russian.

=== Karmaliuk the Brigand (1908) ===
Karmaliuk the Brigand (Ukrainian: Розбійник Кармелюк, Russian: Разбойник Кармелюк), initially published in Russian, became the first valuable example of Ukrainian adventure novel. During the 1920s an article by Yuriy Mezhenko in the magazine Chervonyi Shliakh claimed the book to be not inferior to works of Jules Verne and Alexandre Dumas.

=== Other works ===
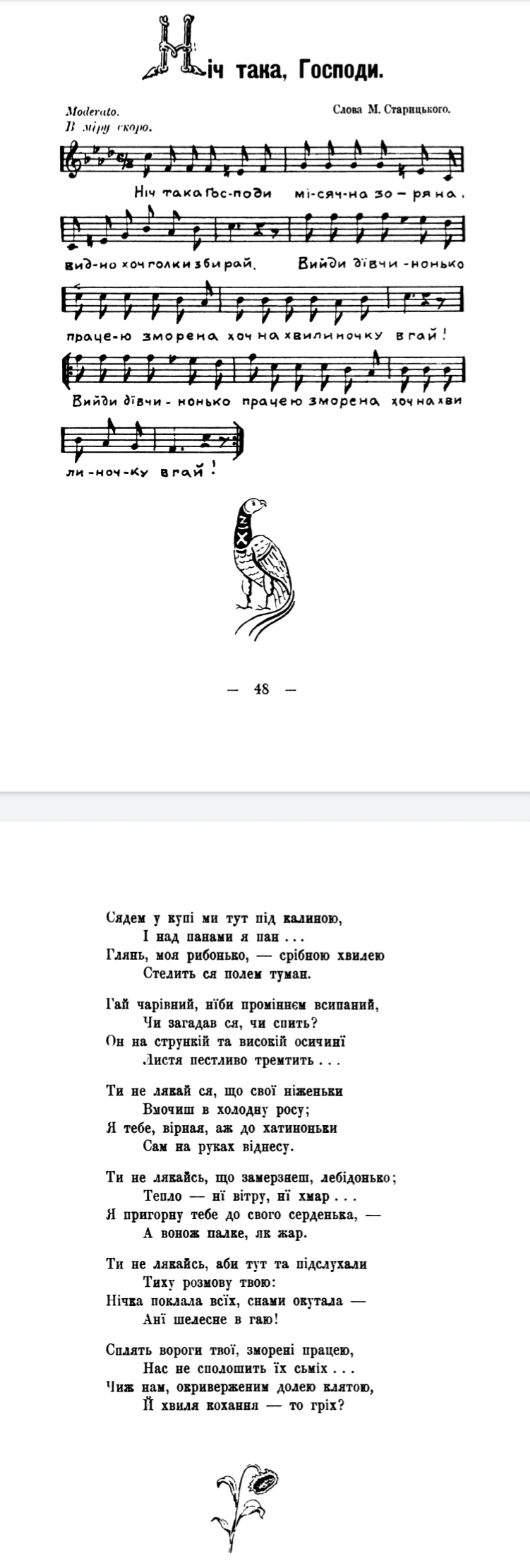
Notes for Starytsky's poem What a Moonlit Night

Series:

- Bohdan Khmelnytsky (Богдан Хмельницький):
  - Before the Storm (Перед бурею, 1897)
  - Storm (Буря)
  - At the Pier (У пристані)
- Mazepa's Youth (Молодість Мазепи) and The Ruin (Руїна)

Novels:

- The Last Eagles (Останні орли)

Short stories:

- The Red Devil (Червоний диявол)
- Siege of Busha (Облога Буші, 1894)
- Cursed Treasure (Заклятий скарб)

Dramas:

- Not Destined (Не судилось, 1883)
- Oh Hryts, Don't Go to Vechornytsi (Ой, не ходи, Грицю, та й на вечорниці, 1890)
- In Darkness (У темряві, 1893)
- Luck (Талан, 1894)
- Marusia Bohuslavka (Маруся Богуславка, 1899)
- Defence of Busha (Оборона Буші)

Opera:

- Christmas Eve (Різдвяна ніч) – as librettist

Poems:

- Songs and Dumas (З давнього зшитку. Пісні і думи, 1881–1883)
- Calling (Виклик), better known as What a Moonlit Night (Ніч яка, Господи, місячна, зоряна..., 1870)

Translations:

- Andersen's Tales (1873)
- Hamlet (1882)

Other publications:

- Serbian folk songs (1876)
