= Vyacheslav Samoylenko =

Ukrainian footballer

Vyacheslav Samoylenko В'ячеслав Самойленко
Personal information
- Full name: Vyacheslav Yuriyovych Samoylenko
- Date of birth: 8 September 1992 (age 34)
- Place of birth: Kirovohrad, Ukraine
- Height: 1.80 m (5 ft 11 in)
- Position: Midfielder

Youth career
- 2004–2007: Youth Sportive School #2 Kirovohrad
- 2007–2009: UFK Kharkiv

Senior career*
Years	Team	Apps	(Gls)
2010–2012	Zirka Kirovohrad	17	(2)
2012–2013	Krymteplytsia Molodizhne	11	(0)
2013–2014	Zirka Kirovohrad	11	(0)
2015	Bukovyna Chernivtsi	8	(0)
2015–2016	Hapoel Jerusalem	11	(1)
- * Club domestic league appearances and goals as of 29 October 2015

Vyacheslav Samoylenko (Ukrainian: В'ячеслав Юрійович Самойленко; born 8 September 1992 in Kirovohrad, Ukraine) is a Ukrainian football midfielder who plays for Hapoel Jerusalem F.C. in the Liga Leumit.

Samoylenko is a product of the Youth Sportive School Kirovohrad and UFK Kharkiv. His first trainer was Vitaliy Dyadenko.

He spent majority of his career in the Ukrainian First League.
