= Kremenchugsky Uyezd =

Kremenchugsky Uyezd Кременчугъ уѣздъ
- Uezd
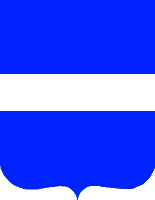
- Coat of arms

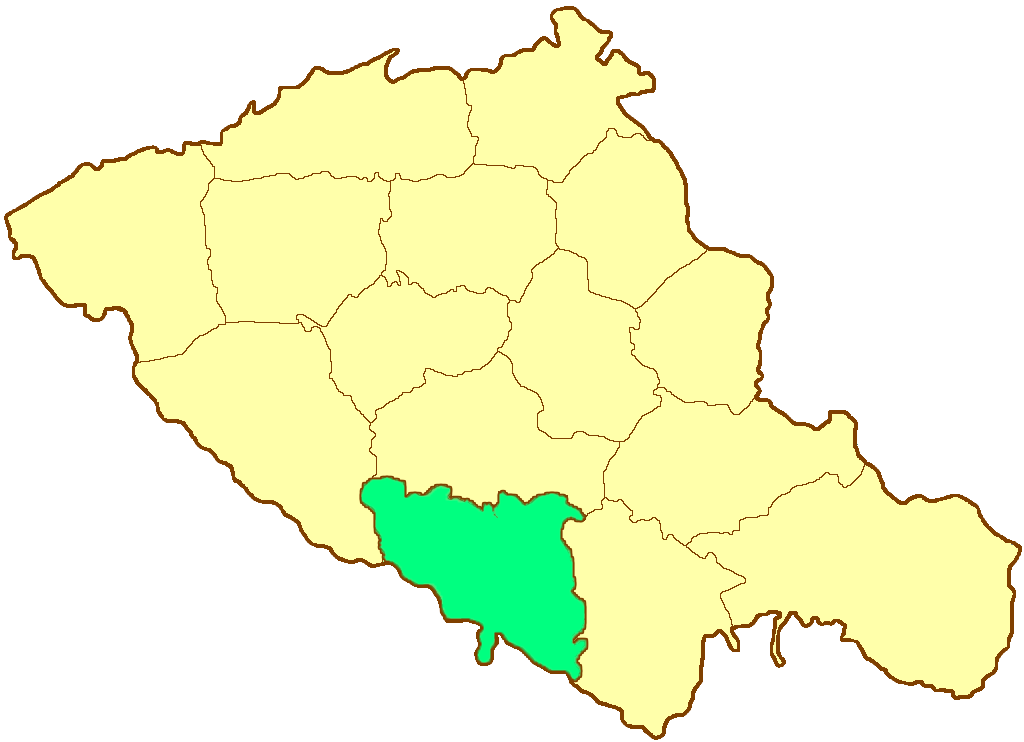
- Location in the Poltava Governorate
- Country: Russian Empire
- Governorate: Poltava
- Established: 1781
- Abolished: 1923
- Capital: Kremenchug

Population (1897)
  - Total: 244,894

Kremenchugsky Uyezd (Кременчугский уезд) was one of the subdivisions of the Poltava Governorate of the Russian Empire. It was situated in the southern part of the governorate. Its administrative centre was Kremenchug (Kremenchuk).

== Demographics ==
At the time of the Russian Empire Census of 1897, Kremenchugsky Uyezd had a population of 244,894. Of these, 80.3% spoke Ukrainian, 13.1% Yiddish, 5.5% Russian, 0.5% Polish, 0.2% German, 0.1% Belarusian and 0.1% Tatar as their native language.
