= Union for the Freedom of Ukraine trial =

1930 show trial in Kharkiv, Ukrainian SSR

Union for the Freedom of Ukraine vs. Soviet Union
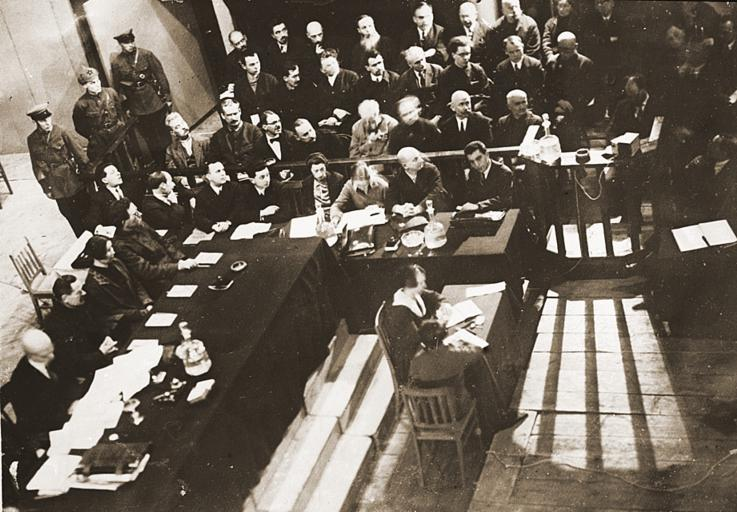
- Court: Supreme Court of the Ukrainian SSR; Ukrainian State Central Opera building, Kharkiv
- Citation: anti-state activities

Case history
- Subsequent actions: imprisonment and exile

Court membership
- Chief judge: Anton Prykhodko

The Trial of the Union for the Liberation of Ukraine (Ukrainian: Процес Спілки Визволення України, СВУ, romanized: Protses Spilky Vyzvolennia Ukrayiny, SVU) was a court trial considered one of the show trials in the Soviet Union.

The event took place in the capital of the Ukrainian SSR, Kharkiv in the building of local Opera Theatre (at that time the Ukrainian State Central Opera) from March 9 to April 19, 1930.

Forty-five Ukrainian intellectuals, theologians, writers, and a librarian were accused of anti-state activities (or counter-revolutionary activities for some). Fifteen of the defendants worked in the organization of the All-Ukrainian Academy of Sciences. About thirty of them were members of former Ukrainian political parties. One was a former prime-minister while two others were ministers of the Ukrainian People's Republic. Finally, six were members of the Central Rada. Amongst those 45 defendants, two were of Jewish background and three were female.

According to the Museum of Soviet Occupation, this proceeding became a sort of political slogan to persecute Ukraine's older and foremost academic intelligentsia, as well as representatives of the Ukrainian Autocephalous Orthodox Church (UAOC-Lypkivsky). According to one of the defendants, the Senior attorney of the secret department of Kyiv okrug department of GPU Solomon Bruk was repeating during the interrogations: "We must put the Ukrainian intelligentsia on its knees, it is our duty and it will be executed; those whom we would not be able [to subdue], we're going to shoot!" Soon after that, 700 other people were arrested in connection with the process. The total number is not known, but tens of thousands of people are estimated to have been arrested, exiled, and/or executed during and after the trial including 30,000 intellectuals, writers, teachers, and scientists.

== Accusations ==
According to Soviet sources, the SVU was an underground organization which supposedly existed in Ukraine from June 1926 to July 1929, when it was exposed by the Joint State Political Directorate. The SVU allegedly existed in the Ukrainian diaspora (it should not be confused with the Union of Liberation of Ukraine, which operated during World War II abroad).

According to the indictment, the SVU put the task of liberation of the Ukrainian people in all ethnographic Ukrainian territory and the establishment of an independent Ukrainian Republic, which had to be parliamentary and democratic, with a broad right of citizens to private property. The indictment alleges that the SVU was preparing popular uprisings, in close agreement with leaders of the Ukrainian diaspora. In addition, the Ukrainian Youth Association (CYM) was to organize terrorist acts against the Soviet Union and Soviet Ukrainian leaders.

== List of the accused ==
Among others in the dock were:

- Serhiy Yefremov, an academician of the Ukrainian National Academy of Sciences, former deputy chairman of the Central Rada, and a member of the UPSF.
- Volodymyr Chekhivsky, former member of the Central Committee of the USDRP, Prime Minister of Ukraine, theologian, founder and administrator of the UAOC.
- V. Durdukivsky, a teacher, former member of the UPSF.
- Yosyp Germaize, a historian, professor of the Kyiv Institute of People's Education, former member of the USDRP.
- Andriy Nikovsky, a literary critic and writer, former member of the UPSF, and Foreign Minister of the UPR.
- Liudmyla Starytska-Cherniakhivska, a writer (former UPSF member ) and wife of the histologist and professor of the Kyiv Medical Institute, Oleksandr Chernyakhivsky.
- Mykhailo Slabchenko, academician, historian, professor of the Odesa Institute of People's Education, former member of the USDRP.
- A. Hrebenetsky, teacher.
- Vsevolod Hantsov, philologist, former member of the UPSF.
- H. Holoskevych, linguist and associate of the Ukrainian National Academy of Sciences.
- Mykola Pavlushkov, student of the Kyiv Institute of People's Education, which Soviet authorities considered the founder of the Ukrainian Youth Association (CYM).

The Chairman of the Ukrainian Supreme Court who heard the case was Anton Prykhodko, the chief prosecutor M. Mykhailyk (Attorney-General of the Republic and Deputy Narkom). Among the public prosecutors were Panas Lyubchenko, academician A. Sokolovsky and writer O. Slisarenko.

On the side of the defendants were Ratner, Vilensky and Puhtynsky.

Among the defendants were three females: Liudmyla Starytska-Chernyakhivska, Liudmyla Bidnova, A. Tokarivska; two doctors – members UNAS, 15 professors of higher schools, two students, a director of a middle school, 10 teachers, a theologian and a priest of UAOC, three writers, five editors, two cooperators, two lawyers and a librarian; 15 defendants were employees of UNAS. Many defendants were united through political activities during the struggle for freedom (1917–1920): 31 of them were once members of the Ukrainian political parties (15 – UPSF, 12 – USDRP, 4 – UPSR), one was a prime minister, two – Ministers of the Ukrainian government, six – members of the Ukrainian Central Rada. According to the indictment act, 33 of the accused belonged to the Kyiv group of SVU, three represented Dnipropetrovsk and Odesa, two – Poltava and Mykolaiv, and a single representation was from Chernihiv and Vinnytsia. Among the defendants were two Ukrainians of Jewish ethnicity: a historian Yosyp Germaize and a lawyer Morhulis.

== Process and verdict ==
The process had numerous inconsistencies. Leaders of the Ukrainian emigration strongly denied prosecutors' allegations that the emigration gave instructions to SVU. In particular, L. Chykalenko denied that he ever sent a letter of instruction to Yefremov. The existence of such a letter was also denied by J. Hermayze. N. Pavlushkova (sister of the defendant) argues that "SVU as an organization was the centre for a very narrow circle of people, not more than 12–15, without a strong organized periphery" and it recognized that the confessions at the trial of the defendants was forced.

Despite the Soviet SVU publicity process, the sentence was considered too moderate. According to K. Turkalo, one of the defendants, the prosecutor threatened 13 of the defendants with the Highest Degree of Penalty (death penalty), but did not demand it. 45 defendants were sentenced to 10 years of imprisonment in strict isolation, 6 to 8 years, 3 to 6 years, 10 to 5 years, 21 to 3 years and 1 to 2 years, 10 received a suspended sentence and were immediately released. 5 more were pardoned in a few months. Some prisoners had been sent to the Solovetsky Islands. In the 1930s and during the first months of World War II, many participants of the SVU were again arrested and disappeared. Most of the accused died in prison or in exile, only a few emigrated (K. Turkalo), and some were rehabilitated after World War II (V. Hantsov, V. Atamanovskyy).

In modern Ukrainian opinion, the dominant thought is that SVU and SUM did not exist as organizations, and were provocations of the GPU (V. Holubnychyy, V. Hryshko, M. Kowalewsky, G. Kostyuk, Yu. Lavrinenko, R. Sallivant, K. Turkalo, P. Fedak), however some sources recognize the existence of SVU (N. Pavlushkova, W. Ivy).

The hypothesis that SVU–SUM was a fictitious organization of the GPU is supported by the existence of other show trials (such as the Shakhty process in 1928 or the so-called Prompartia (Industrial Party) in December 1930), which were purely political.

It is more probable that the defendants in the SVU process were Ukrainian patriots, who actively worked for the Ukrainian national cultural renaissance in the 1920s, but did so spontaneously, without creating any anti-Soviet political organization, and no directives from Ukrainian emigres.

== See also ==
- Union for the Liberation of Ukraine
- The Executed Renaissance
- Case of the Union of Liberation of Belarus
