= Aleksandr Fedotov =

Russian actor, playwright and director (1841–1895)

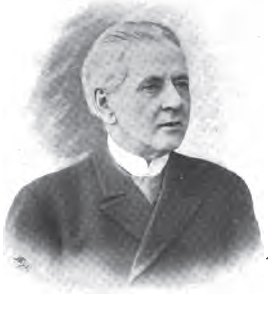
Aleksandr Fedotov

Aleksandr Filippovich Fedotov (Russian: Алекса́ндр Фили́ппович Федо́тов, 1841–1895) was a Russian actor, theater director, and playwright affiliated with the Maly Theater and one of the founders of Moscow's Society of Art and Literature in 1887.

He had a profound influence on the young Konstantin Stanislavski, who later wrote that

Fedotov knew how to surmount the wall that lay between the actor and his role, and how to rip off the uniform of false tradition, giving instead of it the true traditions of real art. As was his habit, he would mount the stage himself and play, creating what was true and full of life, and so destroying all that was false and dead. He played the plot of the play, but the plot was thoroughly connected with the psychology, and the psychology with the image and the poet. . . . Fedotov would play a part, and his playing would make the part clear. The organic nature of the part would show itself in its full beauty.

He was the husband of actress Glikeriya Fedotova.

== Sources ==
- "Федотов, Александр Филиппович" . Brockhaus and Efron Encyclopedic Dictionary (in Russian). 1906.
