= Union for the Liberation of Ukraine =

The Union for the Liberation of Ukraine (Ukrainian: Союз визволення України, СВУ; Soiuz vyzvolennia Ukrainy, SVU) was a political organization that was established on 4 August 1914 in Lemberg, Kingdom of Galicia and Lodomeria. The organization was established by Ukrainian emigrants from the Russia-held Dnieper Ukraine and who were socialist by their political views representing such political parties like Revolutionary Ukrainian Party (RUP), Ukrainian Social Democratic Workers Party (USDRP), Socialist-Democratic "Spilka" ("Fellowship"). The organization was headed by its presidium that consisted of Andriy Zhuk, Volodymyr Doroshenko, Oleksandr Skoropys-Yoltukhovskyi, and Markian Melenevskyi.

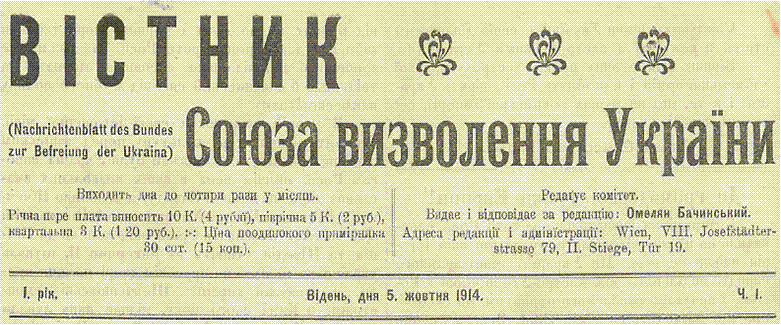
Herald of the Union for the Liberation of Ukraine

The SVU engaged in propaganda and Ukrainophile enlightenment efforts among Ukrainian prisoners-of-war. It was allocated funding and allowed access to POW camps in return for pledging to support the Central Powers war effort and moderating the relationship between the Austrian and Russian militaries and the Ukrainians of eastern Galicia and the Russian Empire. After the 1917 February Revolution, the SVU organised two Ukrainian divisions from captured POWs— the Bluecoats under the German army and the Greycoats under the Austrian army which were later incorporated into the army of the Ukrainian People's Republic. Following the signing of the Treaty of Brest-Litovsk in February 1918 that recognised Ukrainian independence, the SVU dissolved itself on 1 May.

== Publications ==
SVU published numerous periodicals for Ukrainian prisoners of war, as well as the German-language weekly Ukrainische Nachrichten ("Ukrainian News"), published in Vienna, and the French-language La Revue Ukrainienne ("Ukrainian Review"), issued in Lausanne.

== See also ==
- Union for the Freedom of Ukraine trial

== Sources ==
Erlacher, Trevor (2021). Ukrainian Nationalism in the Age of Extremes: An Intellectual Biography of Dmytro Dontsov. Cambridge, MA: Harvard University Press. doi:10.2307/j.ctv2d8qwsn. ISBN 978-067-425-093-2. JSTOR j.ctv2d8qwsn.

- Roman Malko, "Music from the shadows", Zerkalo Nedeli, September 14–20, 2002. in Russian, in Ukrainian.
- Kuromiya Hiroaki, The Voices of the Dead - Stalin's Great Terror in the 1930s, Yale University Press, New Haven and London, 2007, ISBN 0300123892.
