= Stolypin wagon =

Type of railroad carriage

Stolypin car (Russian: Столыпинский вагон, romanized: Stolypinskiy vagon) is a type of railroad carriage in the Russian Empire, Soviet Union, and modern Russia.

During the Stolypin reform in Russia around the end of the 19th century, which gave the Russian peasantry an opportunity to voluntarily resettle in Siberia with huge plot of land and a no-interest money loan as a part of Stolypin Agricultural reform, a special type of carriage was introduced for these settlers. It consisted of two parts: a standard passenger compartment for a peasant and his family and a large zone for their livestock and agricultural tools.

After the Bolshevik Revolution, the Cheka and then the NKVD found these carriages convenient for the transport of larger numbers of incarcerated convicts and exiles: the passenger part was used for prison guards, whereas the cattle part was used for prisoners.

== Prison transportation in modern Russia ==
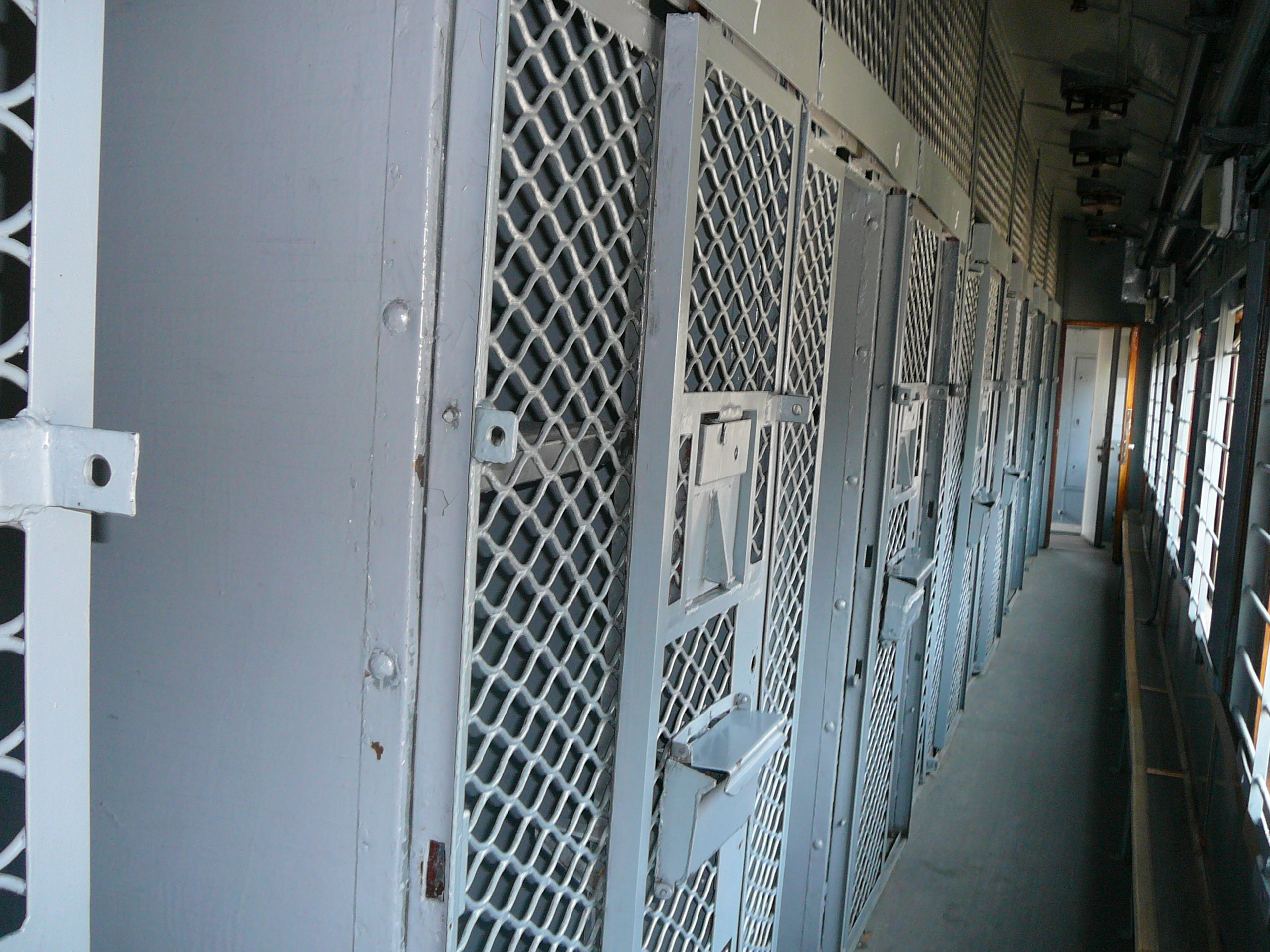
Inside a Russian prison wagon

Modern prison wagons are manufactured at Tver wagon plant, model 614500. The car has 9 chambers and is capable of transporting up to 75 convicts. Chambers have no windows, but there is a side corridor. It is escorted by 8 officers of the FPS and 2 Russian Railways conductors. The car is towed as part of regular passenger trains, but is coupled either to the head or the rear of the train, and isolated from other cars.

== See also ==
- Prison Train (Movie)
- PTV
- The Guard (1990 film)
