= Ukrainian jazz =

Jazz music, its history and scene in Ukraine

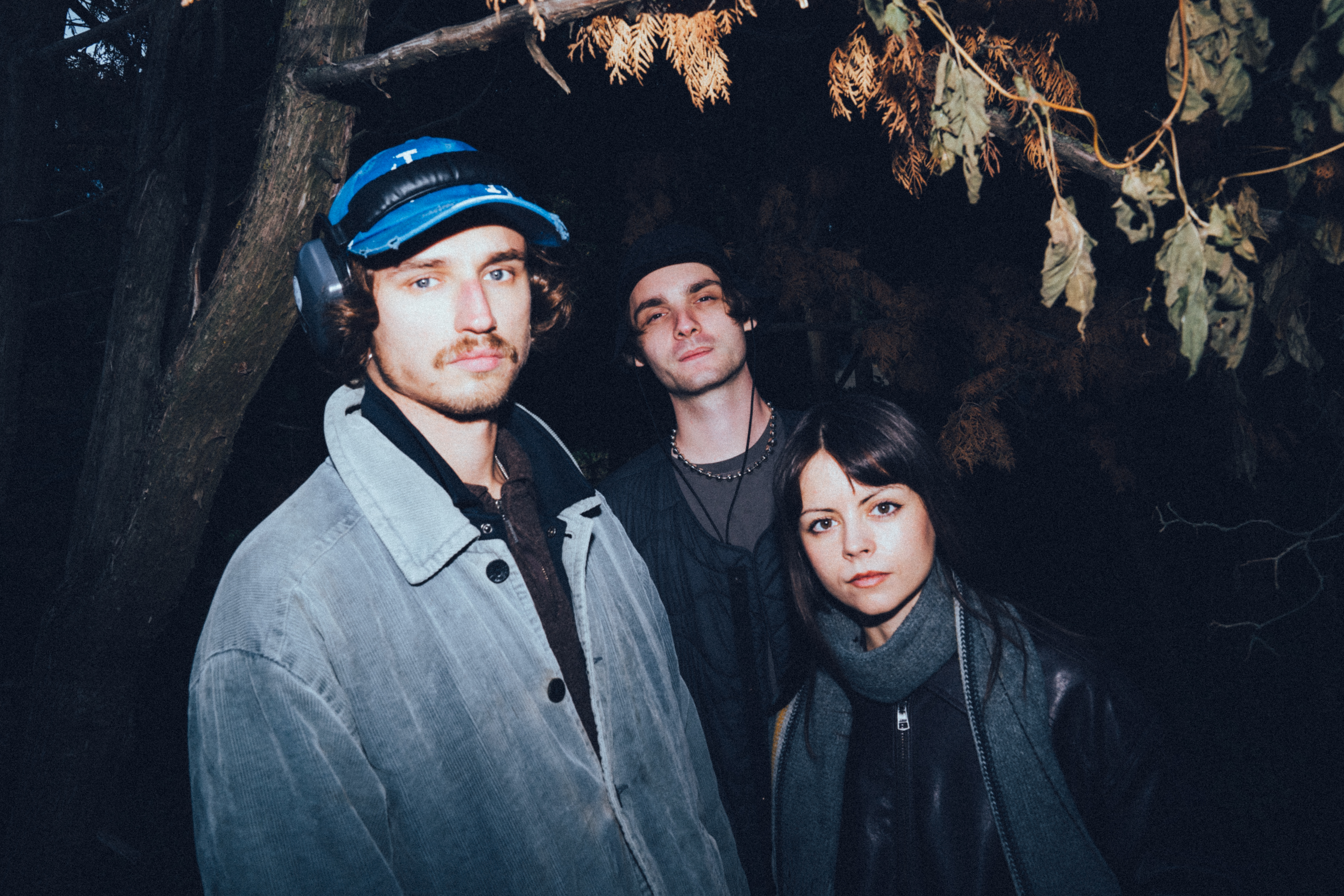
Hyphen Dash, winners of the 2025 Ukrainian Jazz Prize in the best jazz band category

Ukrainian jazz encompasses the jazz scene in Ukraine and the work of Ukrainian jazz musicians abroad. Jazz ensembles were active in the country from the 1920s; from the 1960s, a network of jazz clubs developed, hosting concerts and festivals. Instrumental and vocal ensembles and solo performers work in various jazz styles, combining jazz with folklore, rock music and electronic music.

Jazz is taught in Ukraine at music colleges, higher education institutions and specialist schools. Festivals provide concert venues for Ukrainian and international artists. Ukrainian radio and television broadcast programmes devoted to jazz. In 2019, the jazz-format station Radio Jazz began broadcasting in Kyiv.

Ukrainian jazz musicians have performed and recorded abroad, and Ukrainian melodies have been used in jazz arrangements. In 2025, the Ukrainian Institute and Europe Jazz Network established the Ukrainian Jazz Prize for jazz bands and releases.

== History ==
=== Early decades ===
In 1924, Yuliy Meitus formed one of Ukraine's first jazz ensembles in Kharkiv. Based at the Proletkult theatre, the ensemble provided music for productions and gave concerts in 1924–1926. Its instruments included a xylophone, violin, grand piano, noise-making instruments and percussion; Meitus played the piano. On 29 December 1925, the ensemble gave a concert of its own at the Ivan Franko State Drama Theatre in Kharkiv.

In 1926, the Jazz Kings, featuring saxophonist Sidney Bechet, toured Kharkiv, Kyiv and Odesa. In 1928, Borys Rensky founded a theatrical jazz orchestra in Kharkiv.

In interwar Lviv, violinist Leonid Yablonsky led the Yabtsio-jazz orchestra, with Anatoliy Kos-Anatolsky on piano and composer Bohdan Vesolovsky (Bondi) on accordion. Alongside their own songs, its repertoire included jazz arrangements of folk songs and Ukrainian-language versions of European hit songs. The orchestra performed at clubs and community halls, and also at resorts in the summer. Vesolovsky also wrote dance songs: the score and lyrics of his tango song "Pryide shche chas" ("The Time Will Come") were published in autumn 1937.

In the 1930s, jazz elements were used in Soviet mass songs and film scores, which reached Ukraine through radio and cinema. In 1940, Henry Vars's Lviv theatrical jazz ensemble recorded two gramophone records in Moscow. In 1946, Vsevolod Rozhdestvensky and Pylyp Kessler were the musical directors of the State Jazz Orchestra of the Ukrainian SSR. In the late 1940s and the 1950s, persecution by the Soviet authorities impeded the development of jazz.

=== Post-war period and the club movement ===
Jazz activity revived from the 1960s, with clubs opening in Dnipropetrovsk (1961), Kyiv (1962) and Donetsk (1967). Festivals added to the concert scene: Kyiv hosted Jam Session–67 in 1967; Dnipropetrovsk hosted Yunist (1968–1971, 1973) and Days of Jazz Music (1981); and Odesa hosted the Odesa Festival (1982–1983).

In Lviv, Ihor Khoma led the Rytm orchestra from 1957 to 1966, and from 1966 led the Medikus ensemble, which represented the Lviv Medical Institute. The ensemble performed at festivals including Yunist-73 in Dnipropetrovsk and Jazz on the Oder in Wrocław.

One Kyiv venue was the Mriia café-club, which opened in 1962; the MKM-62 jazz club began operating there in 1965. From 1986 to 1990, the Kyiv Jazz Club's Musical Salon combined concerts and jam sessions with lectures and meetings with Ukrainian and international musicians.

=== After the restoration of independence ===
In the late 1990s, Ukraine had big bands, Dixieland bands and small jazz ensembles. Vocal jazz was represented by Jazzex Band, founded in 1993 under the direction of Volodymyr Mykhnovetsky. The ensemble performed without instrumental accompaniment, presenting jazz versions of classical works, folk music and popular music. The Jazz Association of Ukraine was active from 1995 to 1998. In the early 2000s, international musicians performed in Kyiv, including Joe Zawinul with The Zawinul Syndicate and John McLaughlin with Shakti.

Oleksiy Kogan organised regular club jazz concerts as part of the project Tema z variatsiiamy. Live ("Theme with Variations. Live"). Jazz compositions also featured in Ihor Zakus's Jazz Kolo concert programmes. According to its organisers, Jazz Kolo made audio and video recordings of Ukrainian jazz musicians' concerts and released them on CD and DVD to build an archive of Ukrainian jazz music.

External videos
- Hyphen Dash
- Hyphen Dash – "11:11", Swing Live series (FUSION JAMS, 2025)

Since the early 2020s, the contemporary jazz community Fusion Jams has been active in Kyiv, with experienced musicians and beginners playing together at its jams. Its co-founders include Myshko Birchenko, leader of Hyphen Dash, which won the best Ukrainian jazz band category at the first Ukrainian Jazz Prize in 2026.

== Musical styles and repertoire ==
Jazz idioms also appeared in composers' works. In 1931, Volodymyr Baltarovych-Shton wrote Neofaustiana, jazz paraphrases on themes from Charles Gounod's opera Faust. The finale of Antin Rudnytsky's Piano Sonata, Op. 10 (1931), uses jazz idioms with elements of ragtime. Jazz also influenced Zhanna Kolodub, whose works include a 1973 suite for big band. Myroslav Skoryk wrote "Blues" for piano in 1964, and in 1970 founded a jazz ensemble with which he recorded two gramophone records.

External audio
- Archival recordings
- "Synia chichka" performed by Ihor Khoma, and recordings by Medikus and the Rytm orchestra (Suspilne Mediateka)

Ihor Khoma's compositions and arrangements incorporated elements of Ukrainian folklore; his instrumental pieces include "Verkhovyna", "Karpaty" and "Kozachok". Guitarist Enver İzmaylov combined Crimean Tatar folklore with electric guitar tapping, a technique that allowed him to play melody, accompaniment and bass simultaneously.

In vocal jazz, instrumental music was performed by voices. From 1974, Mykhailo Tsyhutkin led the Hama ensemble. It interpreted instrumental music in the tradition of Les Swingle Singers; its repertoire also included jazz pieces and arrangements of folk songs. Oleksandr Hebel's Jazz-khoral vocal ensemble, which he led from 1981, performed instrumental music a cappella.

Styles performed included avant-garde jazz, jazz-rock and free jazz. Saxophonist Yurii Yaremchuk also worked with new improvised music.

== Jazz education ==
From the 1920s to the 1970s, jazz musicians in Ukraine were largely self-taught, learning the style through practical work in ensembles and orchestras. In the 1970s, republic-level professional development courses trained the leaders of variety-music ensembles and orchestras. At the Odesa Conservatory, Yurii Kuznetsov taught improvisation as an optional subject from 1979, while Konstanty Wileński taught a course entitled "The Specifics of Harmony and Orchestration in Jazz" at the Kyiv Conservatory from 1982 to 1995.

Professional jazz education in Ukraine took shape in the last quarter of the 20th century. An order of the Ministry of Culture of the Ukrainian SSR provided for training in "Instruments of the Variety Orchestra" from the 1980–1981 academic year at the R. M. Glier Music College in Kyiv and the Odesa Music College. In 1983, the Kyiv department formed a big band in which students gained experience of ensemble playing and gave concerts. The publishing house Muzychna Ukraina had issued publications devoted to jazz since 1968. Between 1980 and 1989, teaching was supplemented with methodological materials prepared by instructors under the direction of V. Symonenko. This work included both manuals and the planning of teaching through curricula and syllabuses. Music college programmes covered theory, harmony, arranging, the basics of improvisation, and playing in ensembles and big bands.

The children's ensemble that Oleksandr Hebel founded in 1981 at Children's Music School No. 10 in Kryvyi Rih formed the basis of the big band he created in 1983. In Dnipropetrovsk, Volodymyr Markhovsky led the children's big band at Music School No. 5 from 1976.

In 2008, after the Kyiv music college was reorganised as the Kyiv Institute of Music, a jazz music department was established. The institute introduced a master's programme in 2010. The Lviv School of Jazz and Contemporary Music opened in Lviv in 2014. Its curriculum included individual lessons on a chosen instrument, jazz history and jazz harmony, and ensemble playing. In 2017, the Ukrainian National Academy of Music formed the student big band SaraBanda. According to its leader, Oleksandr Saratsky, playing in the big band was an academic subject with its own syllabus and assessments; its repertoire included his arrangements of Ukrainian folk songs.

== Festivals ==
A performance at Jazz Bez in Ternopil, 2011

Before the restoration of independence, Jazz on the Dnipro was held in Dnipropetrovsk from 1987, and Cherkasy Jazz Days in Cherkasy from 1988. In Vinnytsia, the International Days of Jazz Music was established in 1996; it is also known as Vinnytsia JazzFest. The DoDzh festival took place in Donetsk from 2001. Musicians from Ukraine and other countries performed at its 2003 edition.

Odesa JazzFest began in Odesa in 2001 as Jazz Carnival in Odesa, the name it used until 2011. Its co-founders included Yurii Kuznetsov, who also served as artistic director. The 2021 programme combined joint performances by international and Odesa musicians with educational events: two free masterclasses for young musicians.

Fliuhery Lvova, an ethno-jazz festival first held in May 2003, used the inner courtyard of Lviv Town Hall as its venue in 2016; Ukrainian and international bands were announced for that edition. Leopolis Jazz Fest began in Lviv in 2011 as Alfa Jazz Fest and took its current name in 2018. Its 2017 concerts took place on three stages; the 2018 programme included both stage concerts and jam sessions with Ukrainian and international musicians. The festival's 2022 edition was cancelled because of Russia's full-scale invasion of Ukraine.

Jazz Bez takes place in cities across Ukraine and Poland, with its first edition held in Lviv and Przemyśl in 2001. The festival held concerts in Lutsk in 2019. The Ukrainian programme for 2025 covered Lviv, Ternopil, Rivne and Drohobych, offering concerts, jams and masterclasses.

The 2011 programme of Jazz in Kyiv, first held in 2008, included jazz film screenings, children's masterclasses and a meeting with a jazz critic as well as performances. The international Romani festival Pap-jazz-fest in Uzhhorod presented jazz within Transcarpathia's cultural life. Its 2019 programme included a conference entitled "The Development of Jazz Art in Ukraine".

The Jazz on Suvorov Street festival took place on Suvorov Street in Kherson in September 2010 and was held again the following year to mark City Day.

Jazz Koktebel held its first edition in Koktebel in 2003. The 2010 edition featured 34 concerts across three stages. After the Russian occupation of Crimea in 2014, the festival moved to mainland Ukraine, holding its 2014–2015 editions in Zatoka and its 2016–2018 editions in Chornomorsk. Later venues included the UBK club on Trukhaniv Island in Kyiv. An edition called Koktebel Jazz Festival Arabatka took place in 2021 in Shchaslyvtseve on the Arabat Spit in Kherson Oblast.

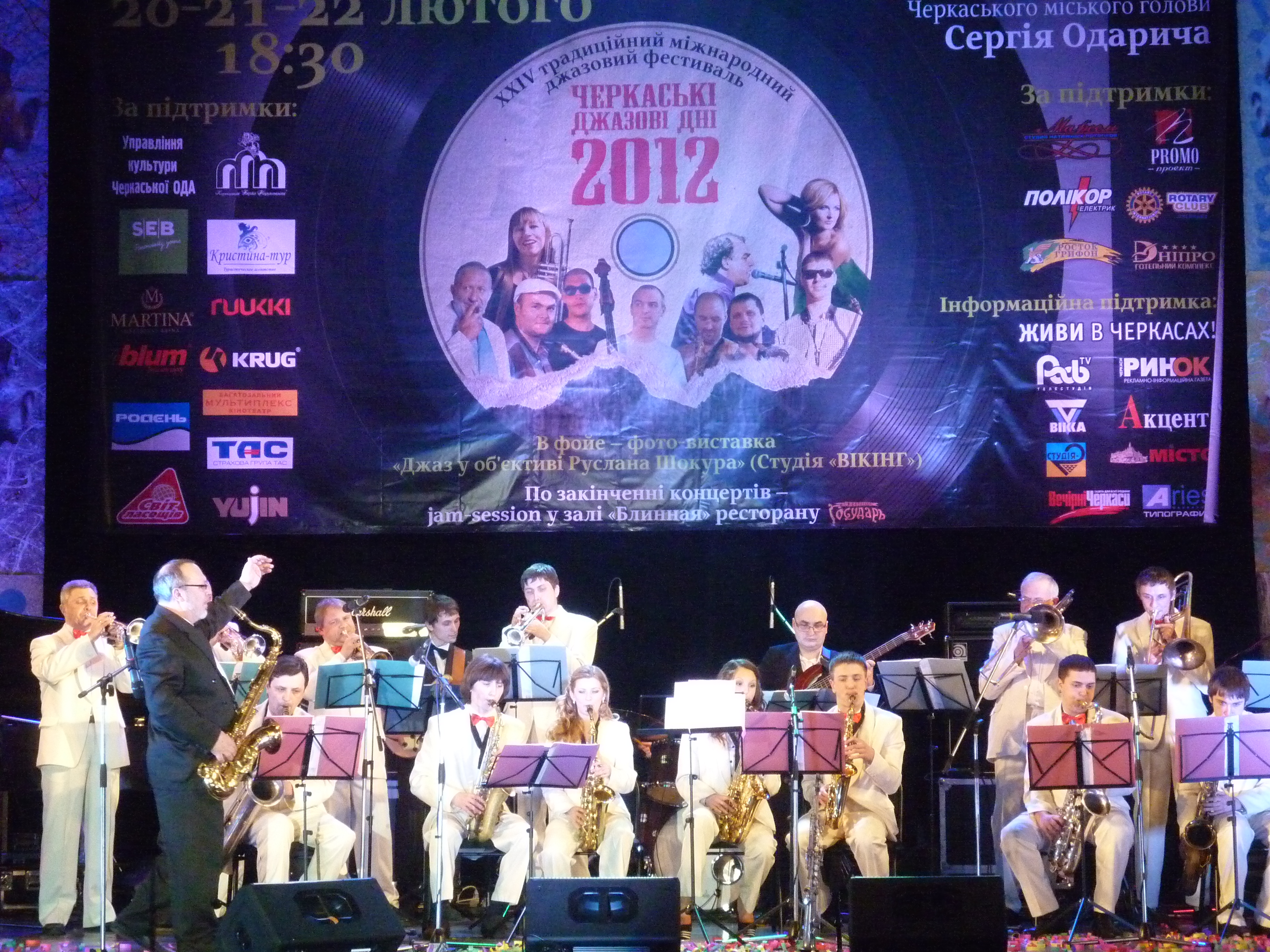
Cherkasy Jazz Days, 2012

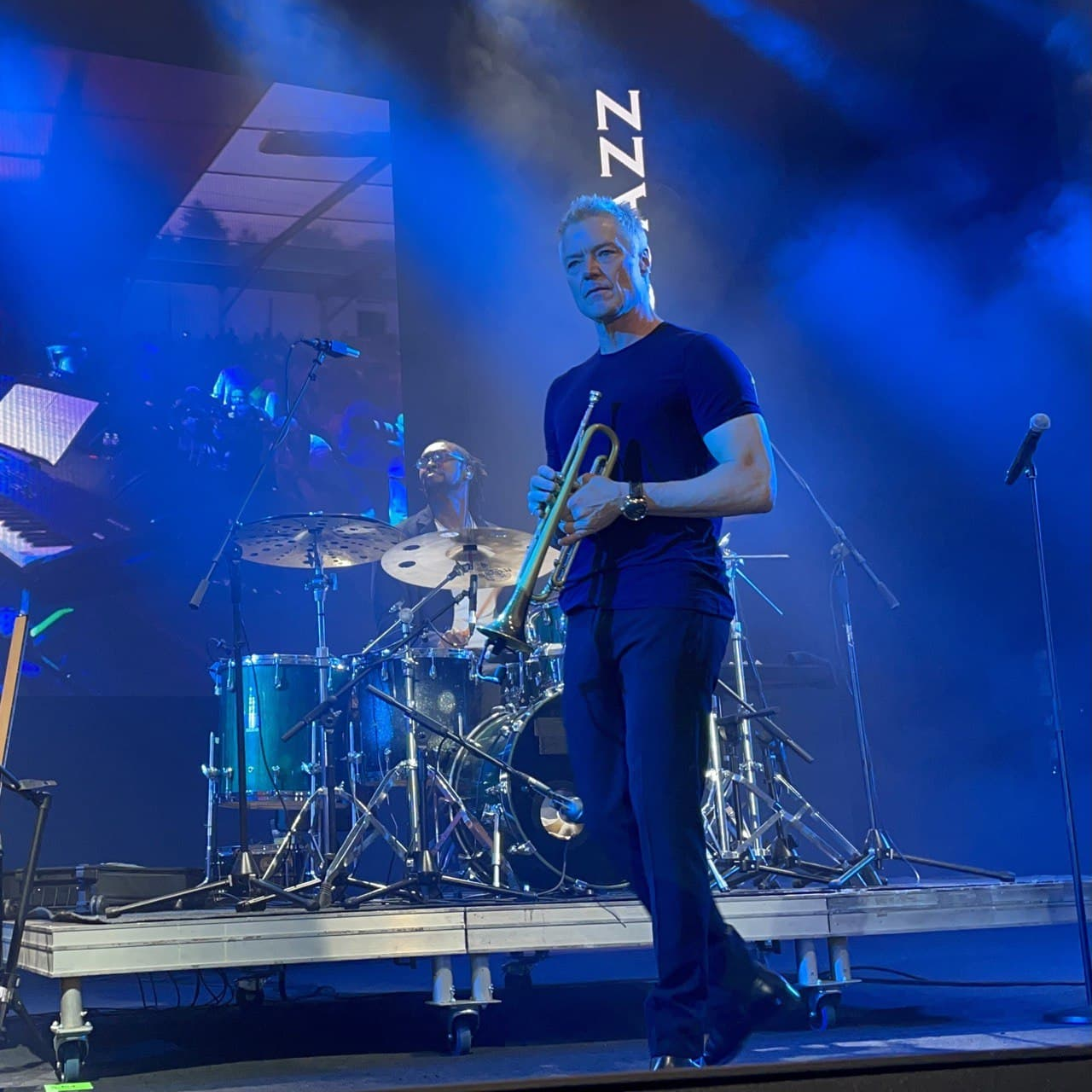
Leopolis Jazz Fest, 2021

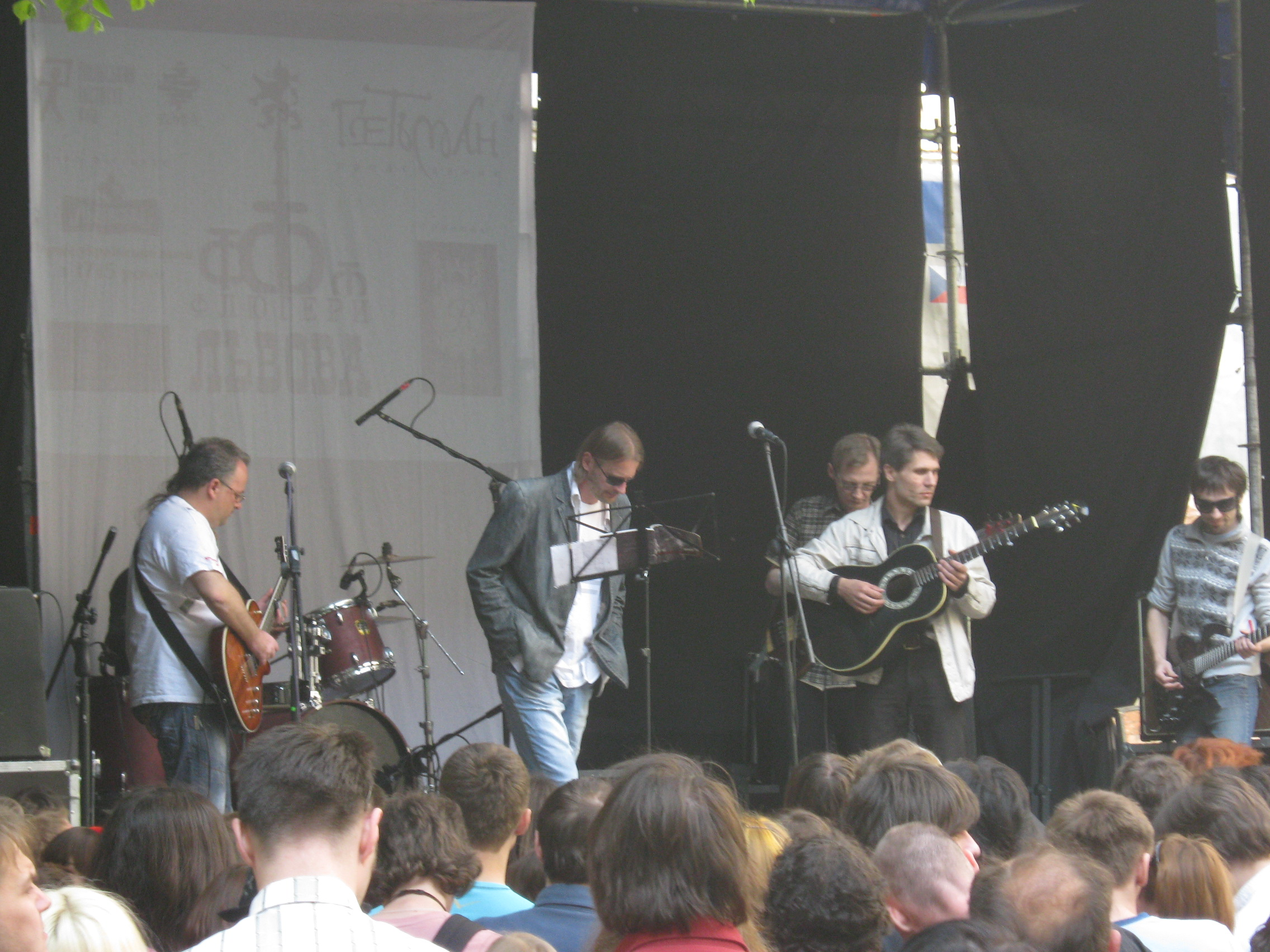
Mertvyi Piven at Fliuhery Lvova, 2011

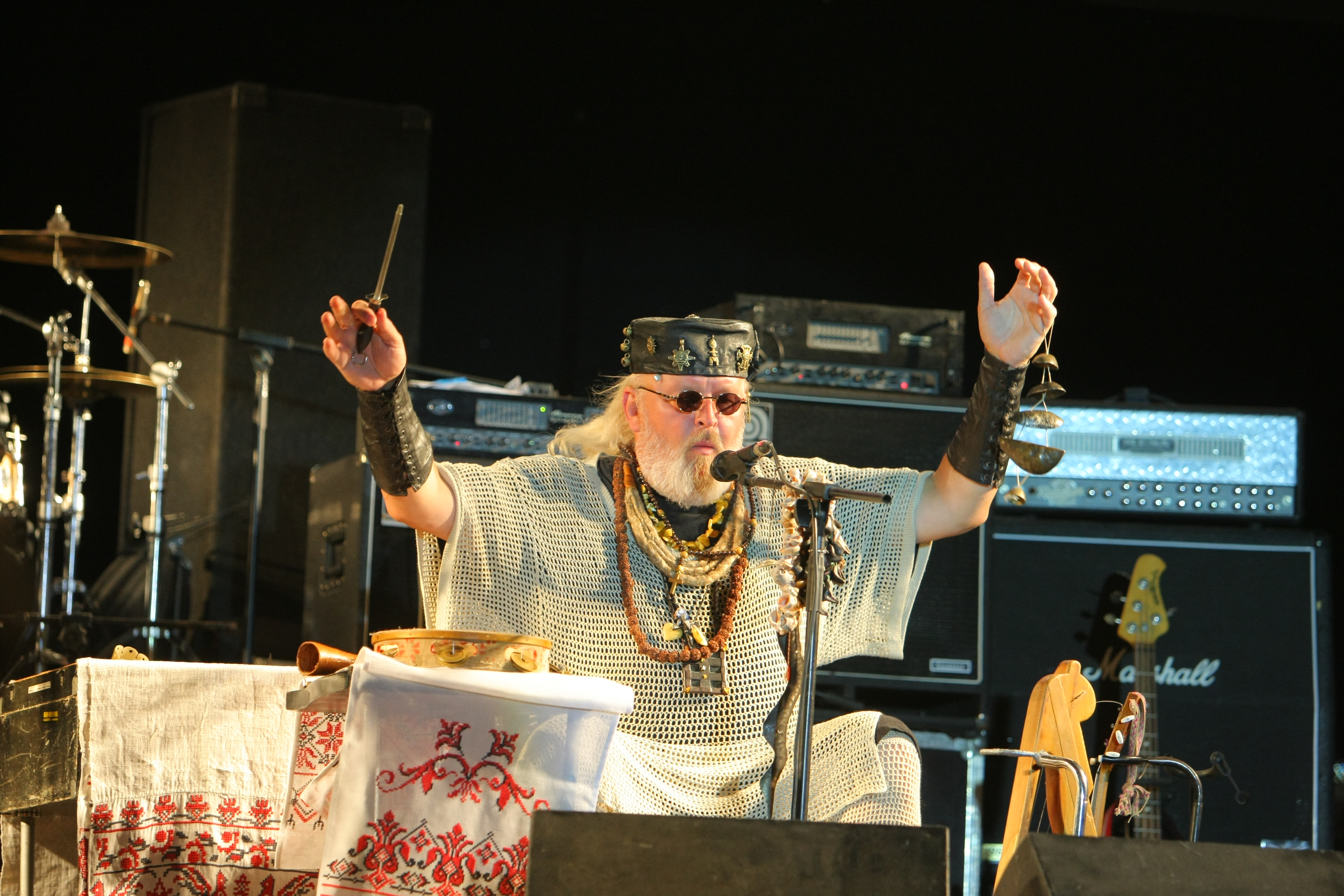
Jazz Koktebel, 2009

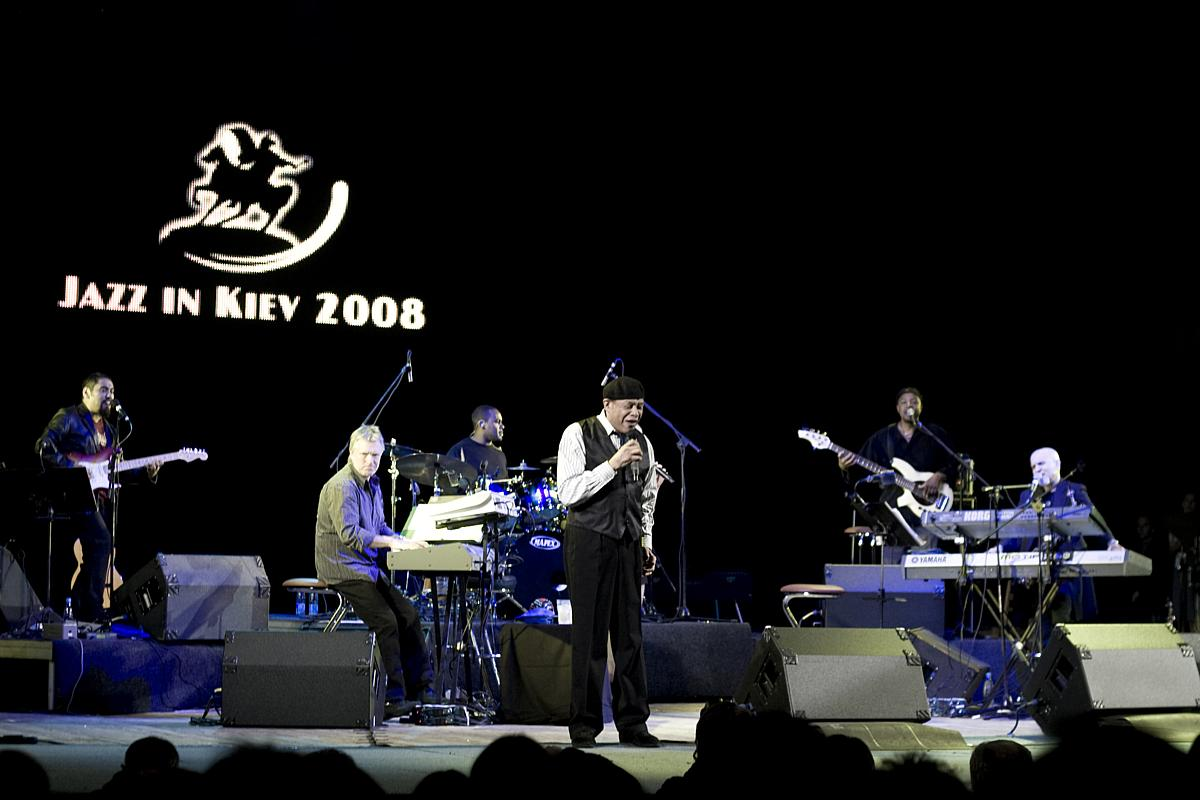
Jazz in Kyiv, 2008

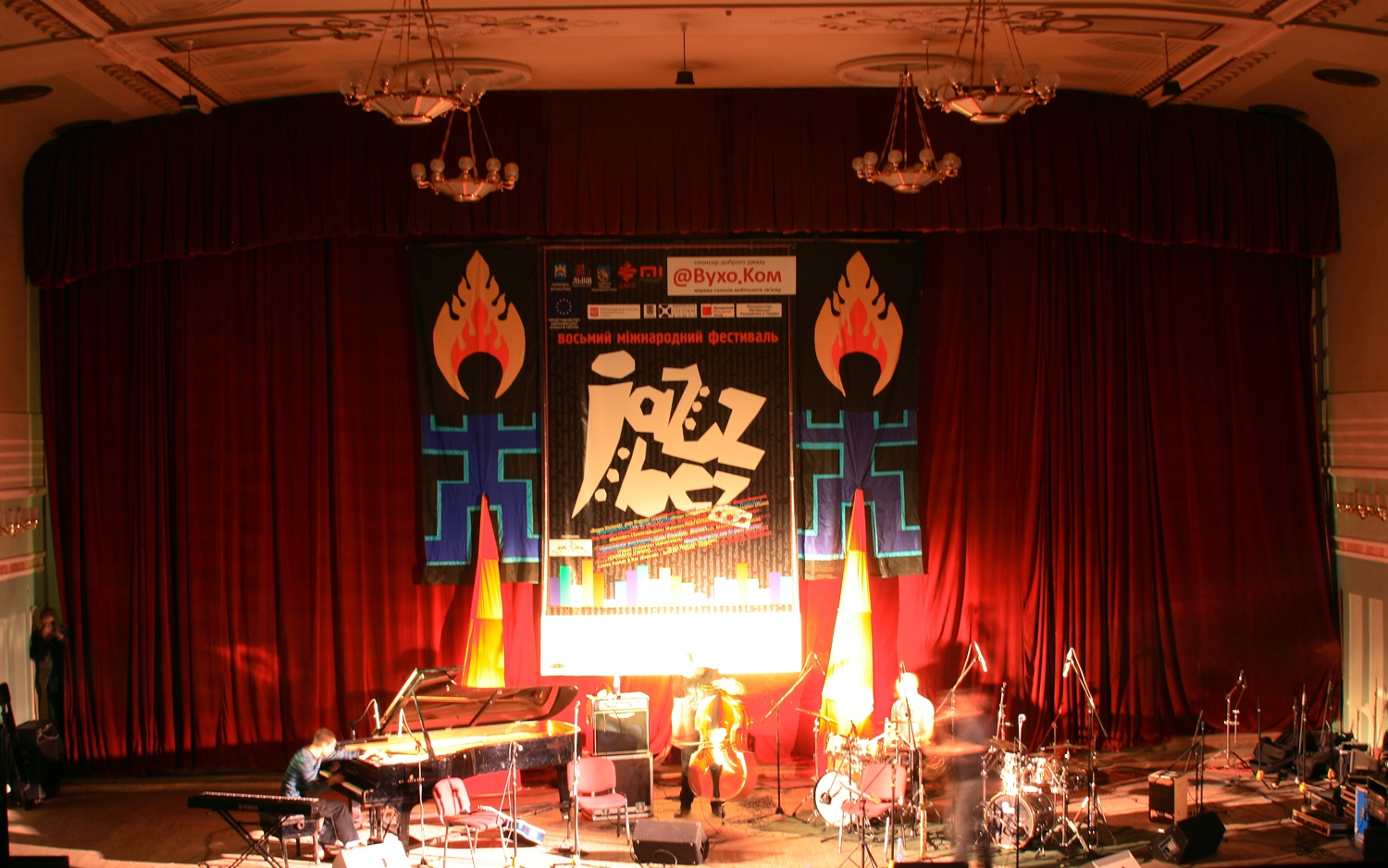
Jazz Bez in Lviv, 2008

== Radio and television ==
From 1974 to 1985, Ukrainian Radio's second service, Promin, broadcast the weekly programme "25 Minutes of Jazz Music", written and presented by M. M. Ammosov. In 1978–1979, it featured "The ABC of Jazz", a series of discussions on jazz history presented by Ammosov and Volodymyr Symonenko. From 1992, the Tet-a-Tet television company broadcast the weekly programme "35 Minutes of Jazz", created by L. A. Goldstein.

From 1992 to 2001, Radio Promin broadcast the jazz programme "Music Lover's Hour", written and presented by Oleksiy Kogan. After a hiatus, he returned to the air in 2018 with a programme of the same name.

=== Radio Jazz ===
Radio Jazz began broadcasting in Kyiv on 15 May 2019. The programming concept set out in the National Council of Television and Radio Broadcasting of Ukraine's decision of 19 February 2026 defines its format as jazz and provides for 24 hours of broadcasting per day. According to the station, its Radio Jazz Standards project explains the history of jazz music from ragtime to fusion.

== Ukrainian Jazz Prize ==
The Ukrainian Jazz Prize (Українська джазова премія) was established in 2025 by the Ukrainian Institute and Europe Jazz Network. The first competition had two categories: best Ukrainian jazz band and best jazz release.

On 17 April 2026, Hyphen Dash was announced as the winner in the band category, and Hilarious Disasters' album Unnatural Root as the winner in the release category. Hyphen Dash received the grand prix on 26 September 2026 at the European Jazz Conference in Cologne.

== Ukrainian jazz in the diaspora ==
External videos
- Diaspora jazz recordings
- John Stetch – "Carpathian Blues" from the album Ukrainianism, 2002
- Ukraine Swings, 1962 ("Ukrainian Vinyl" channel)

In 1962, Ray Carroll made a swing arrangement of a Cossack song, titled "The Cossack's Cha-Cha" on the jazz record Ukraine Swings. The album of Ukrainian melodies was recorded in New York City with the participation of the Sal DeFeo Band.

Musicians who worked in Ukrainian jazz circles also played in ensembles abroad. After working in Kyiv ensembles, trombonist Oleksandr Kofman was based in the United States from 1974, where he played in Lee Konitz's nonet and the Thad Jones–Mel Lewis big band. Pianist Vladimir Horunzhy, who had worked in the Ukrainian Radio and Television Orchestra, moved to Hungary in 1977. He led a big band there and was based in New York from 1981, performing with Randy and Michael Brecker.

In 1994, Canadian jazz pianist John Stetch, then living in New York, toured Canada with his quartet and presented the album Carpathian Blues, which included a composition based on the melody of "Arkan". He is the grandson of Ukrainian community activist Savella Stechishin. According to Stetch, his experience of dancing Arkan prompted him to use the melody in his playing; in his jazz arrangement, he gave the piano the sound of tsymbaly and used minor-key blues.

== Performers ==
=== First half of the 20th century ===
- Yuliy Meitus – pianist; led the jazz ensemble formed in Kharkiv in 1924.
- Borys Rensky – founded a theatrical jazz orchestra in Kharkiv in 1928.
- Yabtsio-jazz – a 1930s Lviv orchestra led by violinist Leonid Yablonsky, with Anatoliy Kos-Anatolsky on piano and Bohdan Vesolovsky on accordion.

The Medikus ensemble, founded in the 1950s by Ihor Khoma.

=== Second half of the 20th century ===
- Ihor Khoma – pianist who led Lviv's Rytm orchestra from 1957 to 1966 and the Medikus ensemble from 1966.
- Yevhen Derhunov – pianist and musical director of the Dnipro jazz orchestra in 1966–1967.
- Oleksandr Shapoval – saxophonist and ensemble leader; his quintet performed at the Yunist festival in Dnipropetrovsk in 1968 and 1971.
- Yurii Kuznetsov – pianist performing solo and with ensembles from 1973.
- Oleksandr Hebel – saxophonist who led a big band formed in 1983 from a children's ensemble in Kryvyi Rih.
- Enver İzmaylov – guitarist with the Sato jazz ensemble; he performed with the group at Jazz Days in Tashkent in 1981.
- Nataliia Hura – jazz and blues singer who performed with Jazz of the Impressionists at the Holosiieve-88 festival in Kyiv.
- ManSound – a male a cappella vocal sextet founded in 1994.
- Ihor Zakus – bass guitarist who formed the band Fest in 1998.

=== 21st century ===
ShockolaD performing at the opening of the Tsytra club, 2019

- Dennis Adu – trumpeter who performed with the Valentine Quintet at Cherkasy Jazz Days in 2006; leader of the Dennis Adu Big Band.
- Acoustic Quartet – a Kharkiv quartet that performed at Jazzper Fest in 2007 and ZaJazz fest in 2008.
- ShockolaD – a band founded in 2004 that took part in jam sessions at Jazz Bez.
- Hyphen Dash – a Kyiv-based band formed in 2019, combining jazz with electronic music.

== Sources ==
- Попова, Аліна Олексіївна (2021). "Джазове мистецтво сучасної України: особливості становлення та розвитку" [Jazz art in contemporary Ukraine: characteristics of its formation and development]. Музичне мистецтво і культура (in Ukrainian) (32, part 1): 137–148. doi:10.31723/2524-0447-2021-32-1-10.
- Лі Шуай (2018). "Джаз у системі українського професійного музичного мистецтва" [Jazz in the system of Ukrainian professional musical art] (PDF). Культура України. Мистецтвознавство (in Ukrainian) (59): 132–145.
- Олійник, Іванна (2021). "Естрадна музика Львова: до пісенної творчості Бонді Весоловського" [Popular music in Lviv: on the songwriting of Bondi Vesolovsky] (PDF). Musica Galiciana (in Ukrainian). 17: 257–264.
- Конончук, Володимир (2011). "Естрадно-джазова освіта в Україні: ретро- та перспектива (До 30-річчя відкриття естрадного відділення в Київському державному музичному училищі імені Р. М. Глієра)" [Popular and jazz music education in Ukraine: retrospect and prospects (On the 30th anniversary of the opening of the popular music department at the R. M. Glier Kyiv State Music College)] (PDF). Молодь і ринок (in Ukrainian) (11 (82)): 99–103.
- Симоненко, Володимир (2004). Українська енциклопедія джазу [Ukrainian encyclopedia of jazz] (PDF) (in Ukrainian). Київ: Центрмузінформ.
