= Ukrainica =

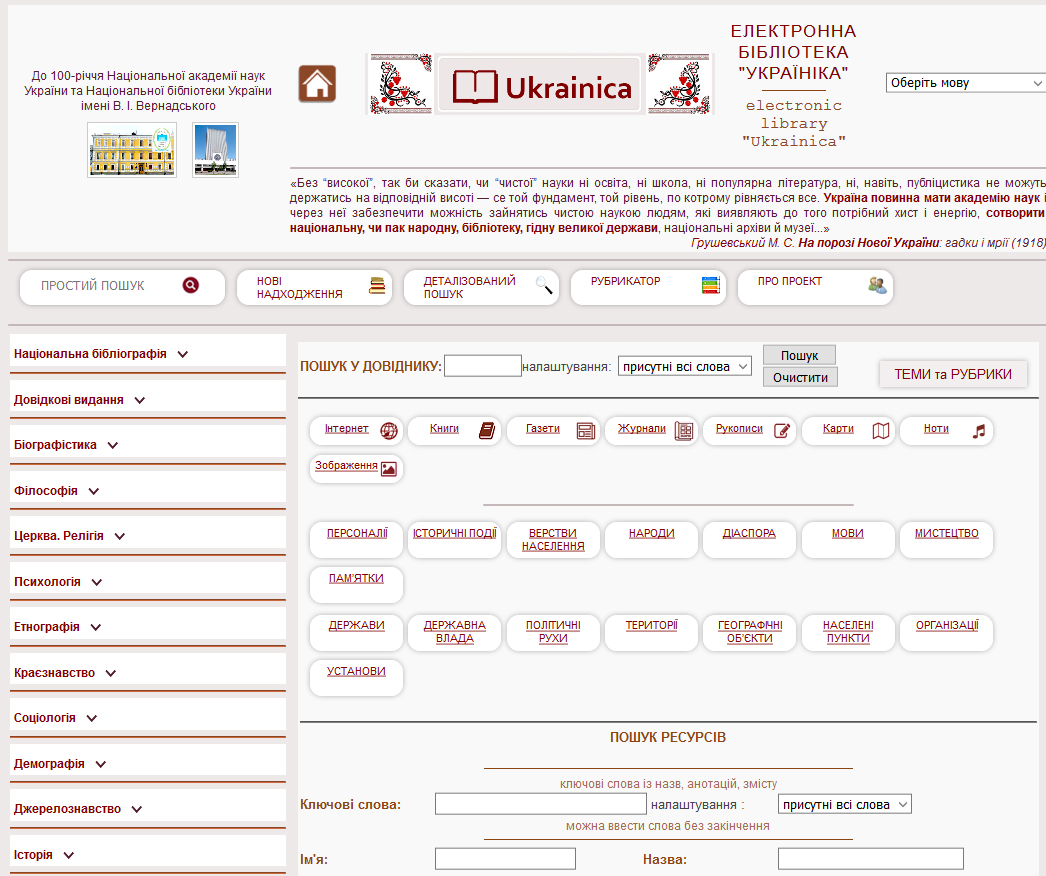
A 2017 screenshot from the Ukrainica electronic library home page

Ukrainica (Україніка) is an electronic library published by the Vernadsky National Library of Ukraine. It was developed by Harvard Ukrainian Research Institute and the Ukrainian Institute, Kyiv. It is described as "a national reference and information and documentary resource of archival, manuscript and printed sources created in Ukraine or other countries - about Ukraine, its history, economy, culture".
