= Alim Aliev =

Ukrainian journalist

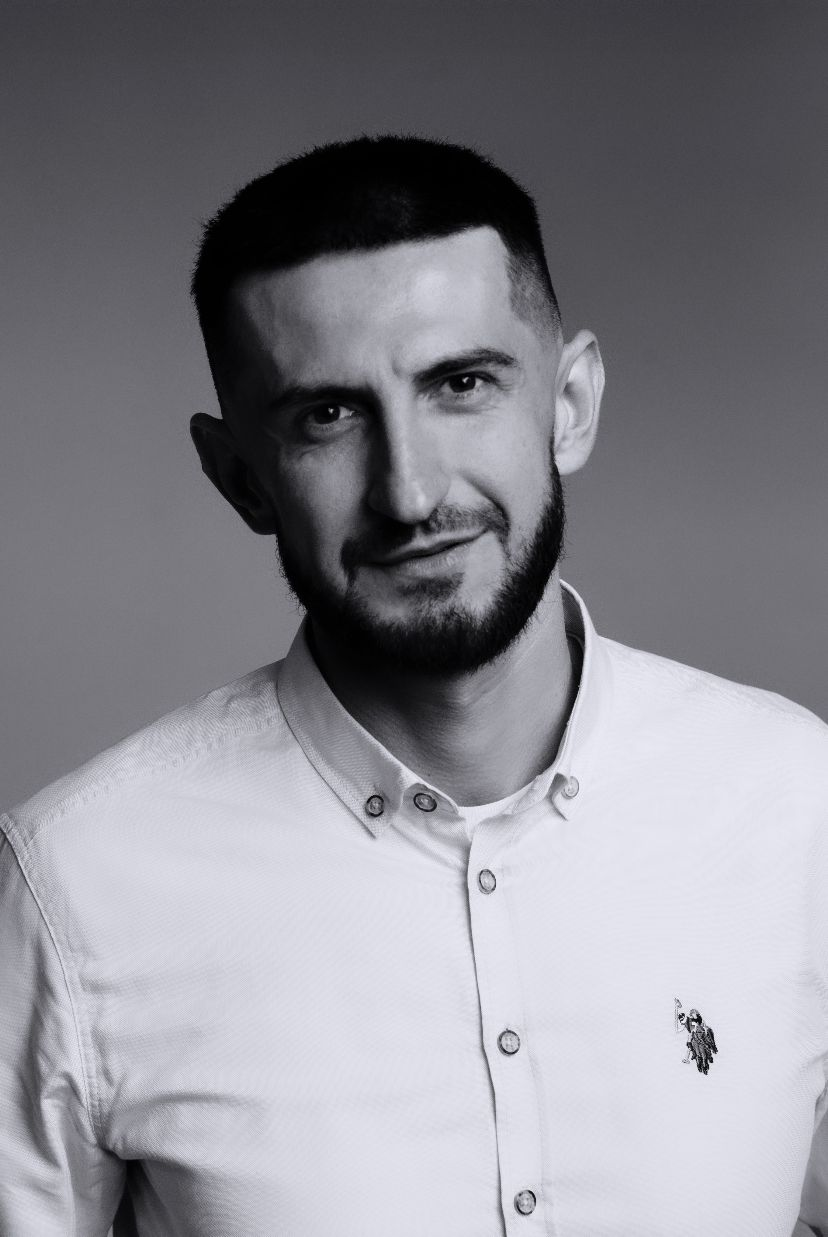
- Born: August 2, 1988 (age 38); Chirchiq, Tashkent Region, Uzbek SSR, Soviet Union
- Citizenship: Ukraine

Alim Aliev (Ukrainian: Алім Нурійович Алієв; born 2 August 1988) is a Ukrainian human rights activist and journalist who is the Deputy Director General of the Ukrainian Institute and a board member of PEN Ukraine.

== Early life and education ==
Aliev was born on August 2, 1988, in Chirchiq, Uzbekistan. In 2005, he enrolled at Tavrida National V.I. Vernadsky University, where he later obtained a master's degree in political science.

He graduated from the European Diplomatic Summer School at the Ministry of Foreign Affairs of the Czech Republic, and Summer Institute in Public Diplomacy at the University of Southern California.

He graduated from the Open World program in 2014, the "Responsible Leadership" seminar at the Aspen Institute in Ukraine in 2019 and CEO development program at Kyiv Mohyla Business School in 2024.

== Career ==
From 2008 to 2016, Aliev worked as an analyst and communication consultant at the "pro.mova" expert company. He also organized events for the media in Ukraine, including one involving former U.S. Secretary of State Madeleine Albright in 2014. On February 27, 2014, he, together with activist Tamila Tasheva and journalist Sevgil Musayeva, founded the CrimeaSOS.

Since 2010, he has been organizing the "Days of Crimean Tatar Culture in Lviv." In collaboration with Sevgil Musaieva, he co-authored the book-conversation with the leader of the Crimean Tatar people, Mustafa Dzhemilev. Unbreakable.

He is a delegate in advocacy missions for the Council of Europe, the European Parliament, the OSCE, the UN Security Council. In March 2019, he delivered a speech at the UN Security Council on the changes that occurred in Crimea during 5 years of the peninsula's occupation.

Since June 2019, he has been the initiator of the creation of the digital museum of the deportation of Crimean Tatars, "Tamırlar."

Since August 2020, he has been the Deputy Director General of the Ukrainian Institute.

== Awards ==
Aliev was awarded the Order of Merit, 3rd class, by Volodymyr Zelenskyy in 2021.
