= Hyphen Dash =

Ukrainian jazz band

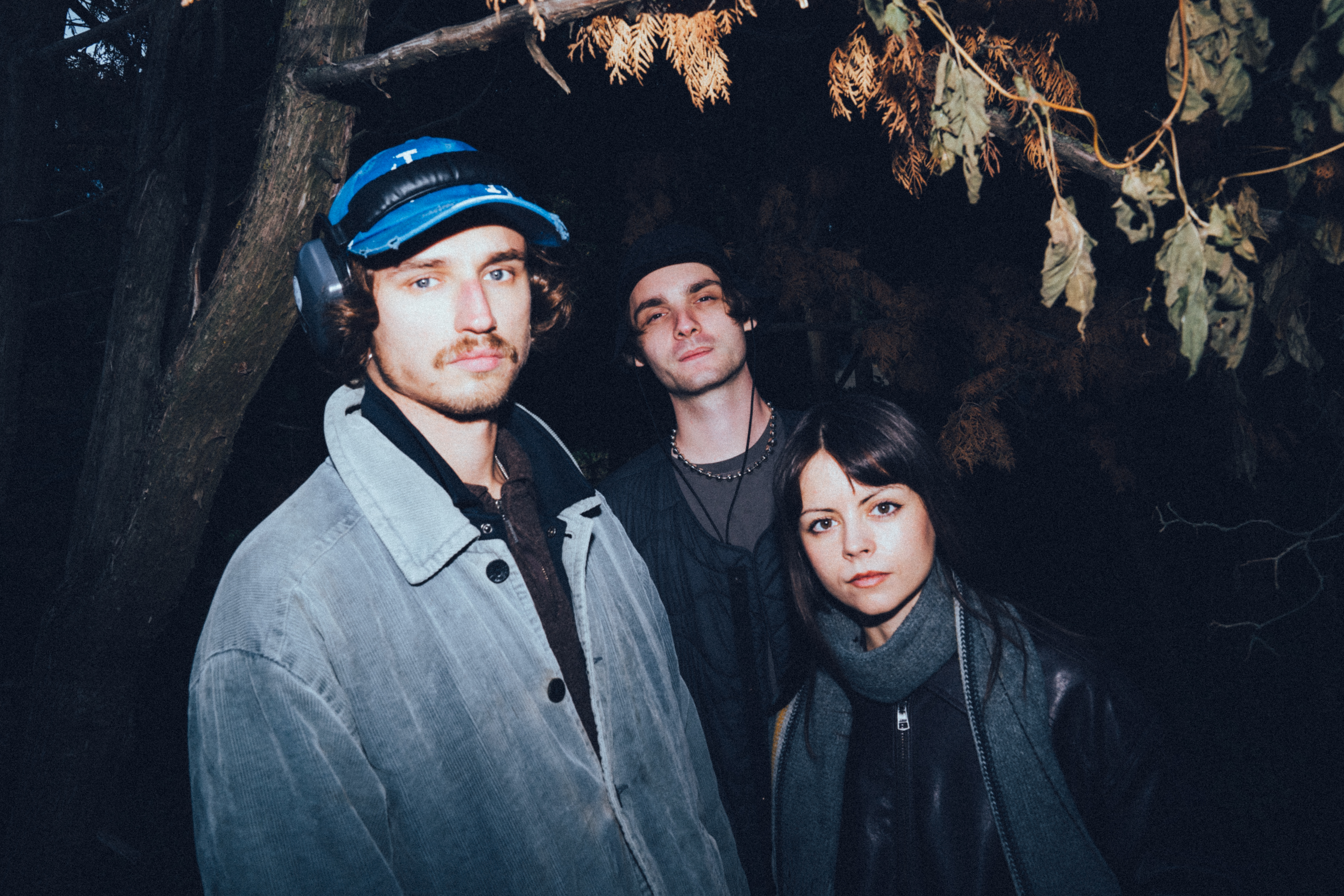

Background information
- Origin: Kyiv, Ukraine
- Genres: Instrumental hip hop, jazz fusion, nu jazz, jazz rock, electronica, post-rock, ambient
- Years active: 2019–present
- Members: Mykhailo Birchenko; Yevhen Puhachov; Polina Maiboroda; Dmytro Startsev
- Past members: Daniil Zubkov

Hyphen Dash is a Ukrainian jazz band formed in 2019 in Kyiv. Its music combines instrumental hip hop, jazz fusion, nu jazz, jazz rock, electronica, post-rock and ambient. The band gained international attention in 2025 with Basement 626, an album recorded some 15 kilometres from the front line. In 2026, the band won the Grand Prix of the first Ukrainian Jazz Prize, being named the best Ukrainian jazz band of 2025.

== History ==
The band was founded by Mykhailo Birchenko and Daniil Zubkov in 2019. They presented their earliest material at Fusion Jams events, a Kyiv community of contemporary jazz. Yevhen Puhachov and Polina Maiboroda later joined the band.

In 2021, Hyphen Dash took part in the "ZMOVA" project run by kontrabass promo and performed their music at the National Art Museum of Ukraine. The project set out to draw attention to historic sites in Kyiv and to raise funds for their restoration. The recording of that performance, Live at NAMU, became Hyphen Dash's first official release.

Between 2022 and 2024, the band played at the festivals XJAZZ! (Germany), Flaam (Slovakia), Reeperbahn Festival (Germany), Inne Brzmienia (Poland), MENT Ljubljana (Slovenia) and the Sharpe Festival (Slovakia).

In March 2025, the band released the album Basement 626, which they recorded that January in a basement in Kramatorsk, 15 kilometres from the front line. According to the members of Hyphen Dash, they wanted to make music "in contact with the reality of war" and to show that "everyone can be involved with the army as much as they wish". On 11 June, the band released a documentary, The Making of Basement 626, about the making of the album (directed by Vadym Piniahin). The film was presented at the Ukrainian House.

We were simply driving out to see our friends in the military, to spend some time together and maybe record some music. We had no plan or concept — we just sat down and started playing. It is our way of capturing reality and passing on the feeling of the moment. (Note: Original Ukrainian: «Ми просто їхали до друзів-військових, щоб провести час разом і, можливо, записати музику. Ми не мали плану чи концепції — просто сідали й починали грати. Це наш спосіб зафіксувати реальність і передати відчуття моменту.»)

— Mykhailo Birchenko

In October 2025, Hyphen Dash released the studio album LATE, which brought together music written between 2019 and 2024: both early recordings of jam sessions in a basement in Pechersk and pieces about the experience of living through the war. On 23 October, Hyphen Dash opened the Slovak festival Jazz Prešov with their performance.

In April 2026, the band won the Grand Prix of the first Ukrainian Jazz Prize and was invited by the Europe Jazz Network to tour Europe, including a performance at the European Jazz Conference in Cologne.

== Members ==
- Mykhailo Birchenko — frontman, drums
- Yevhen Puhachov — guitarist, bass
- Polina Maiboroda — keyboards
- Dmytro Startsev — keyboards
- Daniil Zubkov — former keyboardist, co-founder

== Discography ==
=== Studio albums ===
- 2025 — Basement 626
- 2025 — LATE
- 2026 — I Was Afraid of Stone Rooms

=== Extended plays ===
- 2021 — Live at NAMU

=== Singles ===
- 2021 — "Twisted Mind"
- 2021 — "RDHD"
- 2023 — "Professor Doctor Honoris Causa Caligari" (with Igor Kirilenko)

=== Music videos ===
- 2021 — "Broken (live at NAMU)" (dir. Stepan Pavliuk, Andrii Tartyshnikov)
- 2023 — "Professor Doctor Honoris Causa Caligari" (with Igor Kirilenko)
- 2025 — "LUVUHEIT" (dir. Vadym Piniahin)

== Gallery ==
Hyphen Dash, 2025

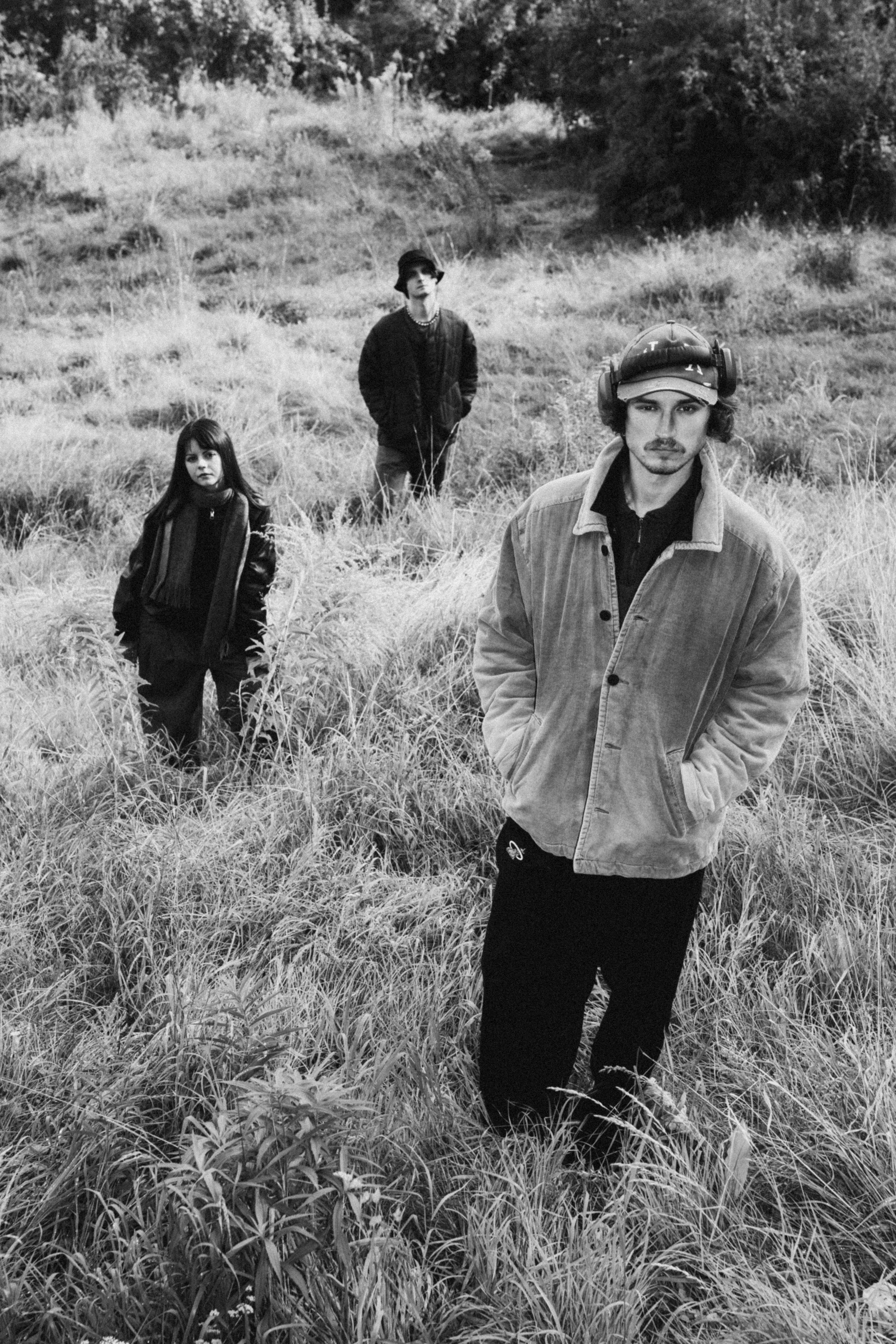

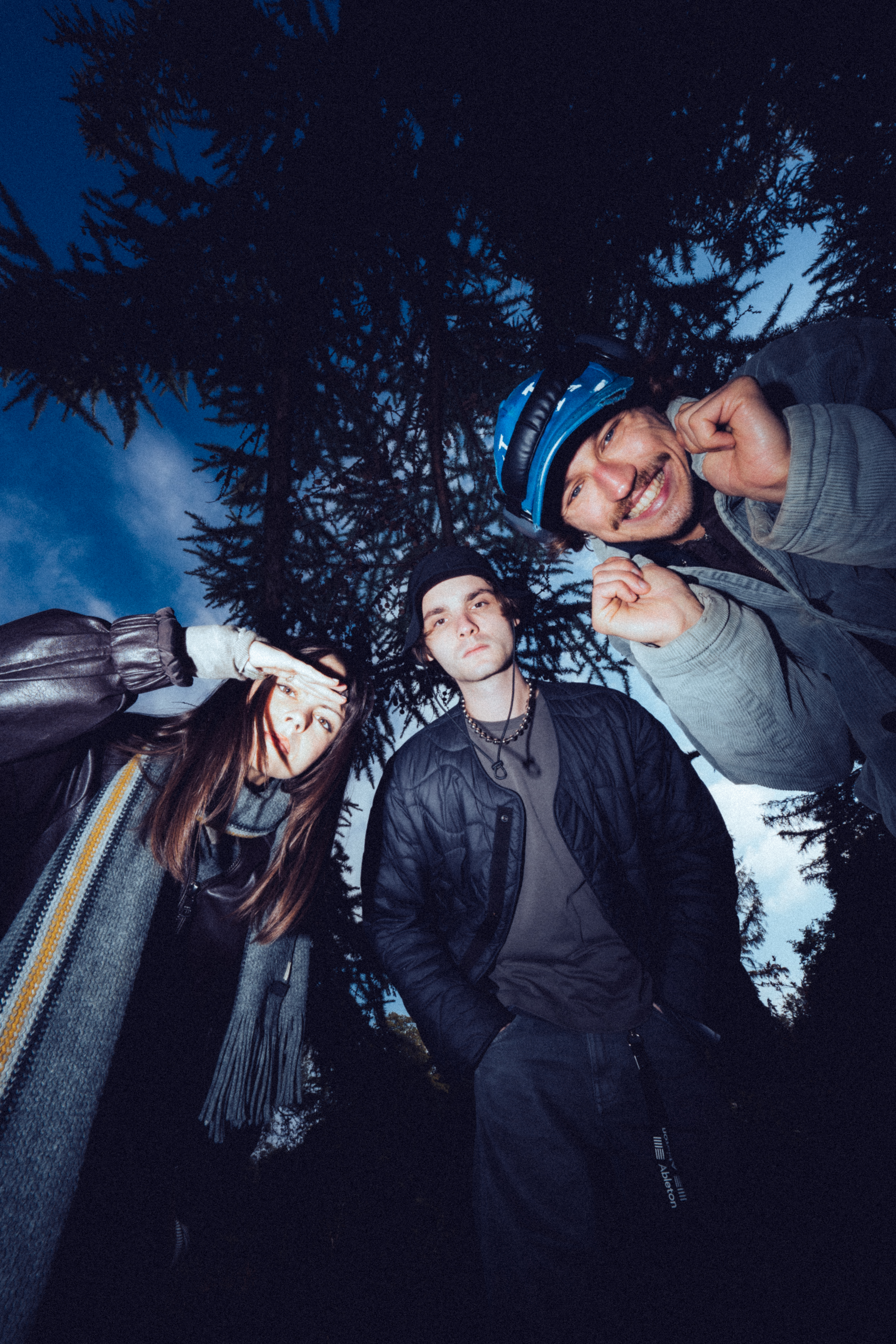

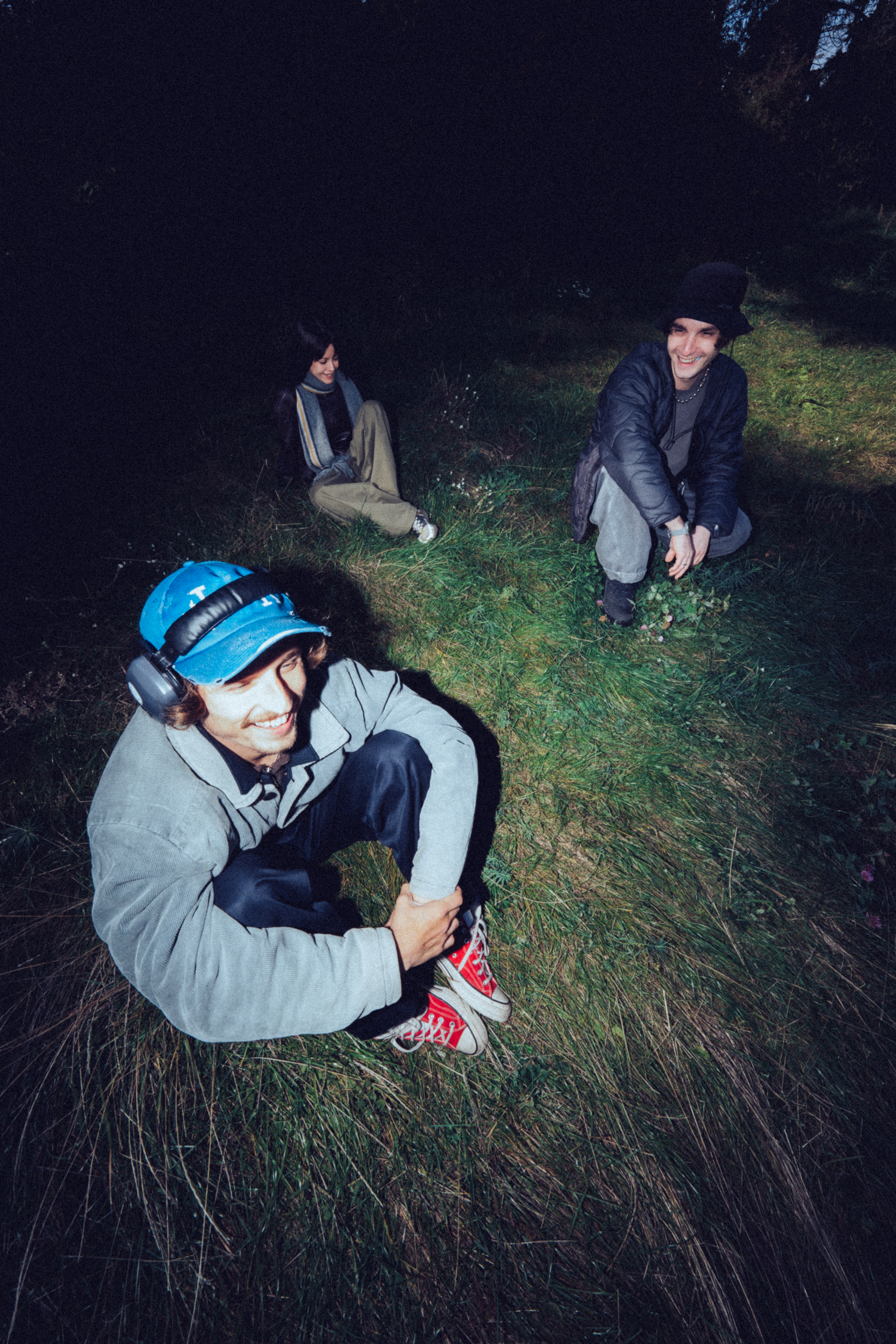
