= Koktebel Jazz Festival =

Jazz and world music festival in Zatoka and Bilhorod-Dnistrovskyi, Ukraine

Coordinates: 44°58′01″N 35°13′59″E

- Genre: Jazz, World music
- Dates: Middle of September
- Locations: Zatoka and Bilhorod-Dnistrovskyi
- Years active: 2003 - present
- Founders: Liliya Mlynarych
- Website: http://koktebel.info

The Koktebel Jazz Festival is a jazz and world music festival in Ukraine. Until 2013, it used to take place annually in second week of September in Koktebel on the Black Sea coast. In 2014, following the Russian annexation of Crimea, the festival relocated to Zatoka and Bilhorod-Dnistrovskyi (both in Odesa Oblast).

== About the festival ==
Koktebel Jazz Festival (KJF) kicked off in 2003 as an attempt to revive Koktebel's status as the cultural center of the region, back at its days famous all over the country.

Since 2006, the festival is held in the second half of September, during so-called "velvet" resort season. Despite its young age, the festival has already hosted performances by De-Phazz, Stanley Clarke, Billy Cobham, Nino Katamadze, Us3 and others. Beside well-known names, organizers consider small and young bands. In 2008, festival community was launched, where anyone can file an application for participation. The best performers chosen by users voting will take part in the upcoming festival.

The festival consists of two main stages, which host the festival program, additional stages and numerous jam-sessions. The main stages do not have any entrance fees and are located at the square right near the water.

In 2014, the festival was not held in Crimea, but in Zatoka and Bilhorod-Dnistrovskyi (both in Odesa Oblast). The festival remained in Zatoka through 2018.

In 2015, the Koktebel Jazz Festival was once again held in Zatoka. The Culture Ministry of Ukraine warned that foreign participants in the Jazz Party could be banned from entering Ukraine in the future. In 2015, the Zatoka festival welcomed approximately 50 bands from Ukraine, Europe, and the United States.

In 2019, it was held on Trukhanov Island in Kyiv. The festival was canceled in 2020 due to Covid.

In 2021, the festival was held in Shchaslyvtsevo.

== History ==
=== 2003 ===
Participants:

- Shid-Side (Ukraine)
- Crimea MVD Orchestra (Ukraine)
- Jan Tabachnik (Ukraine)
- Night Groove (Ukraine)
- Jurij Kuznetsov & Tatiana Boeva
- Enver Ismylov
- Dixie Friends (Russia)
- Vladimir Solianik

=== 2004 ===
July 15–18

Participants:

- Igor Butman Quartet (Russia)
- Motion Trio (Poland)
- Tomasz Szukalski Quartet (Poland)
- Vladimir Solianik & Kyiv Art Ansamble (Ukraine)
- Patina (Latvia)
- Night Groove (Ukraine)
- City Jazz (Ukraine)
- Igor Djachenko & Jazz-Ansamble Dnipro (Ukraine)
- Vladimir Lazerson Band (Russia)
- Dixie Friends (Russia)
- Vladimir Molotkov & Gena Gutgartz (Ukraine)
- Enver Ismailov (Ukraine)

=== 2005 ===
August 15–21

Participants:

- De Phazz
- Shibusashirazu Orchestra
- Jimmy Bowskill Band
- Wolfgang Haffner - Sebastian Studnitzky Duo
- Leonid Ptashka Trio
- ManSound
- JVL Big Band featuring Lew Soloff
- Valentine Quartet featuring Lew Soloff
- Vladimir Solianik & Kyiv Art Ansamble
- Big Blues Revival
- VF Six
- Shid Side
- TNMK
- DJ Zipa
- Enver Ismailov
- Green Point Orchestra

=== 2006 ===
September 14–17 Participants:

- Stanley Clarke Band
- Billy Cobham Culture Mix Project
- Andrey Kondakov Brasil All Stars Project
- Alexej Kozlov and ARS Nova Trio
- Saskia Laroo Band
- Kenny "Blues Boss" Wayne
- Tomasz Mucha and Manifest Band
- Apple Tea
- Daha Braha
- Agafonnikov Band
- Aramis
- Olli Siikanen Power Trio
- Susanna Jamalidinova
- Sergey Davydov Trio
- DJ Paul Murphy
- DJ Fun2Mass
- Doctor Jazz
- Kyiv Salsa Kings

=== 2007 ===
September 21–23

Notable participants:

- Us3
- Nino Katamadze & The Insight
- Fatima Spar & Freedom Fries
- The Shin
- Elena Frolova & Creoles Tango Orchestra

=== 2008 ===
September 19–21

Notable participants:

- Archie Shepp Quartet and Mina Agossi
- Richard Galliano and Tangaria Quartet
- Geoffrey Oryema & Insight
- Red Snapper
- KUBIKMAGGI
- Mamanet
- Rekevin
- Osimira

=== 2009 ===
September 10–13

Notable participants:

- Courtney Pine
- Oi Va Voi
- Tequillajazz
- Haydamaky &*Voo Voo
- Djabe
- Pur Pur
- Серебряная свадьба
- Этно-трио "Троица"
- CherryVata

=== 2010 ===
September 9–12

Notable participants:

- Al Foster Quartet
- Auktyon
- Jerry Bergonzi Quintet
- Karl Frierson
- Paul Rogers Trio
- Carsten Daerr Trio
- Oleg Skrypka & Jazz Cabaret "Zabava"
- Faerd Trio & Jullie Hjetland
- Vadim Eilenkrig and his group
- Karl Ritter Trio
- Серебряная свадьба
- DakhaBrakha

=== 2011 ===
September 15–18

Notable participants:

- Parov Stelar
- Red Snapper
- Éric Serra
- Anna Maria Jopek
- Аквариум
- Alina Orlova
- Billy's Band
- Алина Орлова
- Pianoбой

=== 2012 ===
August 29 - September 2

Notable participants:

- The Cinematic Orchestra
- Lyapis Trubetskoy
- The Tiger Lillies
- Pur:Pur
- Oleg Kostrow
- Tinavie
- Серебряная свадьба
- Нино Катамадзе & Insight
- Zorge
- Gorchitza
- Karl Frierson
- Катя Chilly

=== 2013 ===
September 12–15

Notable participants:

- Patrick Wolf
- Bonobo
- Télépopmusik
- British Sea Power
- Red Snapper
- Nils Petter Molvær
- Montefiori Cocktail
- Billy's Band
- Submotion Orchestra
- Juniper
- David Helbock
- Pur:Pur
- Pianoбой
- Erik Truffaz Quartet

=== 2014 ===
September 12–15

Notable participants:

- The Brown Indian Band
- The Jamal Thomas Band
- Deborah Brown (de)
- Valery Ponomaryov

=== 2020 ===
August 21–23

Participants:

- Big Jazz Orchestra & Peter Vostokov
- ESH Ensemble
- Manka Groove
- The Yakov Okun Ensemble with Larisa Dolina & Hibla Gerzmava
- Anastasia Lyutova & The Band
- Wild Brass
- Igor Sklyar and Jazz Classic Community & Sergei Golovnya
- Moralny Kodex
- Daniel Kramer Trio
- Chetmen
- Bril Brothers with Special Guests Igor Bril & Mariam Merabova
- Sergei Golovnya's SG Big Band, with lead vocalist Karina Kozhevnikova

== See also ==
- Gogolfest
