= Jullie Hjetland =

Danish musician and composer

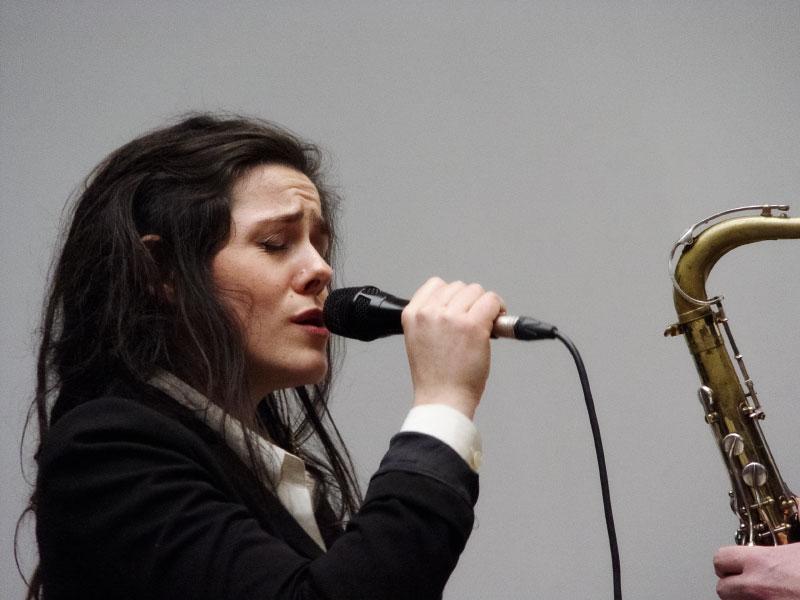
- Aarhus Jazz Festival 2013

Background information
- Born: Denmark
- Genres: Folk; Electronica
- Occupations: Singer; Composer
- Years active: 2008–present
- Website: Official website
- Awards: Danish Music Folk Awards (2009 and 2014)

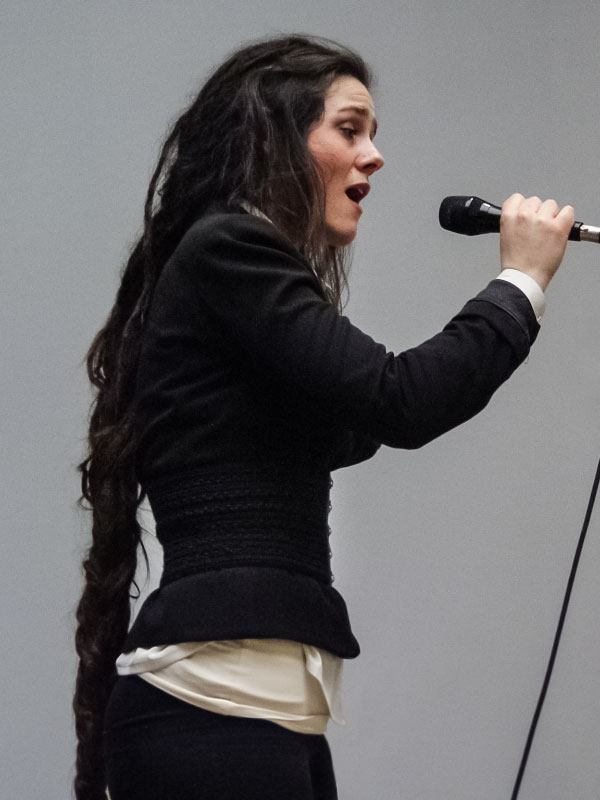
Aarhus Jazz Festival 2013 Photo Hreinn Gudlaugsson

Jullie Hjetland is a Danish musician and composer who records in folk, jazz and electronica genres. She was a recipient of the Danish Music Folk Awards in 2009 and 2014.

== Life and career ==
Hjetland completed her bachelor's degree in folk music at the Carl Nielsen Academy of Music in Odense. She was awarded a master's degree in folk music from the Ole Bull Academy in Voss, Norway (part of the University of Bergen).

Born to a Danish mother and a Norwegian father, Hjetland records in eight Nordic languages. She is the frontwoman of the Danish folk band Basco, also performing folk-influenced electronic music as part of her project Lukkif. Paste magazine describes Hjetland a "shining light of the Danish Nordic roots scene" and praises her "huge vocal range". Hjetland has also collaborated with the Danish musician and composer Henrik Marstal to form a duo combining elements of folk, dream-pop and ambient music.

In 2009, Hjetland was named Vocalist of the Year at the Danish Music Folk Awards. She was named Musician / Singer of the Year in 2014.
