= Anatoliy Kos-Anatolsky =

Ukrainian composer

Anatoliy Kos-Anatolsky

Anatoliy Yosypovych Kos-Anatolsky (Ukrainian: Анатолій Йосипович Кос-Анатольський; 1 December 1909 – 30 November 1983) was a Ukrainian composer, People's Artist of the Ukrainian SSR (1969) and winner of Shevchenko National Prize (1980), and Deputy of Supreme Soviet of the Soviet Union from 1970 to 1978.

== Biography ==
He was born on 1 December 1909 in Kolomyia (now Ivano-Frankivsk Oblast) in the family of the famous Galician doctor Yosyf Kos.

While studying at Stanislav Gymnasium, he created a choir and began recording songs. In 1931 he graduated from the Faculty of Law of Lviv University, and in 1934 from the Lviv Conservatory. In the 1930s, together with Bohdan Vesolovsky, he was a member of "Jablonsky Jazz Chapel" ("Yabtso-Jazz"), later popular in the Lviv region. In 1934 – 1937 he taught at the Stryi branch of the Mykola Lysenko Higher Music Institute. From 1938 to 1939 he worked as a lawyer in the town of Zaliztsi.

The first independent creative work was the music for performances of the Lviv Music and Drama Theater (1941). During the war he was in Western Ukraine. From 1939 he worked as an accompanist of the Lviv House of Pioneers, a teacher at a music school. After the Second World War he became a member and since 1951 chairman of the Lviv regional branch of the Union of Soviet Composers of Ukraine, worked as concertmaster of the Lviv Drama Theater, and from 1952 – a teacher at the Lviv Conservatory (since 1973 – professor).

Died on 30 November 1983 in Lviv. His grave could be found in Lychakiv Cemetery (field No. 3) in Lviv. The tombstone was created by sculptor Emmanuel Mysko.

== Legacy ==
Anatoliy Kos-Anatolsky is the composer of an opera, three ballets, symphonic works, a number of concertos and popular choral works, solo songs, romances. A lot of his works are influenced by Lemkos folklore.

=== Selected works ===
opera

- To Meet the Sun («Назустріч сонцю», 1957, 2nd edition – 1959)

ballets

- The Shawl of Dovbush («Хустка Довбуша», 1950),
- The Jay's Wing («Сойчине крило», 1956),
- Orysia («Орися», 1964, 2-а ред. 1967);

operetta

- Spring Storms («Весняні грози», 1960);

cantatas

- It Passed a Long Time Ago (1961)
- The Immortal Testament (1963);

oratorio

- From the Niagara to the Dnieper («Від Ніагари до Дніпра», 1969);

instrumental

- two piano concertos
- two violin concertos
- harp concerto in F minor (1954)

selected choirs

- Nova Verkhovyna,
- On the Carpathian Mountains

selected songs

- Oh you, girl, from the grain nut («Ой ти, дівчино, з горіха зерня», after Ivan Franko, 1956),
- Oh, I'll go to the mountain («Ой піду я межи гори», own words, 1958),
- Two streams from Black Mountains («Два потоки з Чорногори», after Petrenko)
- White roses («Білі троянди»)
- Starry night («Зоряна ніч»)
