= Bohdan Vesolovsky =

Ukrainian composer and songwriter

Bohdan Vesolovsky

Bohdan Vesolovsky (Ukrainian: Іван-Богдан Весоловський 30 May 1915 – 17 December 1971) was a Ukrainian composer and songwriter.

== Biography ==
Bohdan Ostapovich Vesolovsky was born in Vienna. After World War I, his family moved to Stryi, then within in the Second Polish Republic. He studied at the Faculty of Law of Lviv University, where he graduated in 1937, and the Stryi branch of Mykola Lysenko Higher Music Institute. He graduated from the Consular Academy in Vienna in 1939.

At the age of 16 Vesolovsky started to compose music, and by the age of 22 he had written one of his most popular songs, 'There will come another time' (Прийде ще час). His early works made the young composer famous. In the 1930s, together with the singer Iryna Yarosevych, the violinist Leonid Yablonsky, and the accordionist Anatoliy Kos-Anatolsky, Vesolovsky was a member of Jablonsky Jazz Chapel. The band was a success at parties held by the youth of Lviv in the interwar period, in particular at corporate balls.

During World War II, Vesolovsky served as an officer for the Austria-German border service. In 1949 he moved to Canada, where he worked as the editorin-chief of the Ukrainian version of Radio Canada International in Montreal. In 1960 Vesolovsky was allowed to visit the USSR. He died in Monreal. 20 years later his ashes went returned to Stryi.

== Legacy ==
According to Vesolovsky, the immediate impetus of his composing skills was the lack of Ukrainian entertainment music. At that time, Polish music dominated.

Vesolovsky is known to have written more than 130 works. Songs of his first (Lviv) period are mainly of the tango, foxtrot, and light waltz variety. The lyrics of these songs was mostly about love. In the following years, his songs, such as 'Fly, sad song' and 'Charm of the Carpathian Mountains' were brighter-sounding.

After World War II, Vesolovsky's songs were forbidden in the USSR, though were they were still performed anonymously. A revival of his music in Ukraine occurred during the 2000s. In 2001, with the participation of the composer's wife Olena Vesolovska, the first collection of Vesolovsky's songs was published, which included 56 works. The Ukrainian singer Oleh Skrypka has recorded two albums based on songs discovered in Toronto—'My Heart is Vulnerable' (2009), and 'Dahlia' (2011).

Since 2015 an annual festival in memory of Vesolovsky has taken place in Ukraine.

== Sources ==
- Bondi Vesolovsky and Yabtso Jazz: swinging Lviv in the 1920s-30s
- Ostash, Ihor. (2013) Бонді, або повернення Богдана Весоловського [Bondi or Bjhdan Vesolovsky's returning]. Duliby. ISBN 978-966-8910-73-9
- Lukanov U. (2000) Піонер легкого жанру [Pioneer of light genre]. Day.
- Symonenko, Volodymyr (2004). Ukrainian encyclopedia of jazz. Kyiv, page 24
- Ukrainian music encyclopedia (2006). Rylski Institut. Kyiv. page 344
