= Ukrainian Institute =

State institution represents Ukrainian culture

Ukrainian institute
- Ukrainian: Український інститут

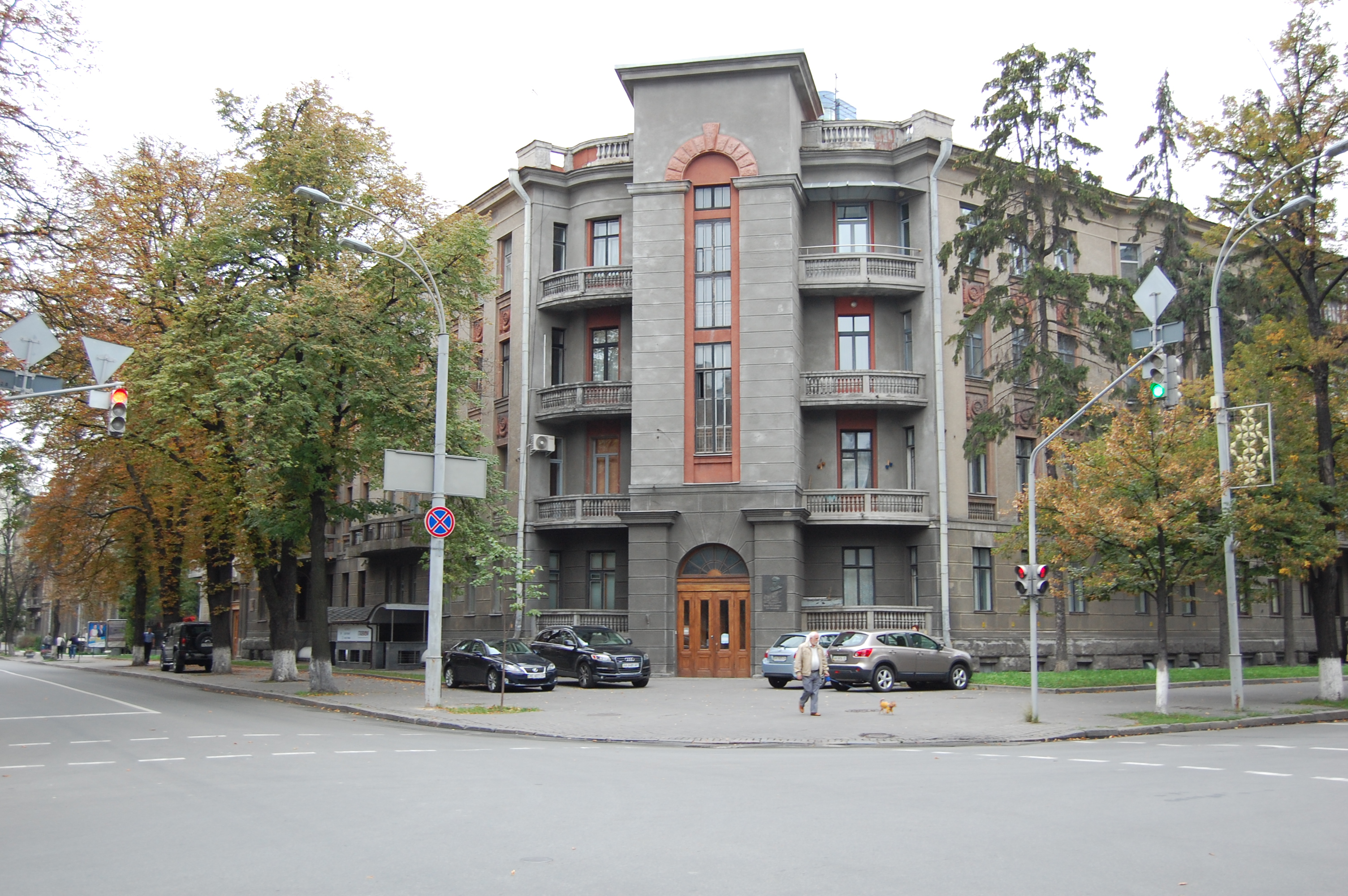

Agency overview
- Formed: June 21, 2017
- Jurisdiction: Ministry of Foreign Affairs
- Status: active
- Headquarters: Kyiv, 01021, Instytutska St 20/8; 50°26′44″N 30°32′03″E
- Agency executive: Volodymyr Sheiko
- Website: ui.org.ua

The Ukrainian Institute (Ukrainian: Український інститут, Ukrayinsʹkyy instytut) is a public institution of Ukraine that aims to represent Ukrainian culture in the world, serve as a tool for Ukrainian cultural diplomacy and support international cooperation projects in creative industries, culture, education and science. The institute was founded by the Cabinet of Ministers of Ukraine in 2017, and is affiliated with the Ministry of Foreign Affairs of Ukraine. It fully began its activities in the summer of 2018, after the appointment to the position of General Director Volodymyr Sheiko, as a result of an open competition and the creation of a team of specialists.

== Objectives ==
- Increase international visibility and improve understanding of Ukraine among people of other cultures
- Promote Ukrainian language and culture internationally
- Support international mobility and facilitate professional exchange, support international cooperation projects in creative industries, culture, education and science
- Share Ukraine's experience of civil society development, state-building, commitment to principles of freedom, democracy and national unity

== Programme priorities ==
The priorities of activity of the Ukrainian Institute formed based on:

- Two internal strategic sessions in August–September 2018;
- Public strategic session of the Institute on October 18, 2018;
- Strategic session on cultural diplomacy jointly with the Ukrainian Cultural Fund;
- Consultations with 80 experts and sector professionals in culture, creative industries and education in August–December 2018;
- Consultations with team leaders and programme managers of the British Council, the Goethe-Institut, the Czech Center, the Polish Institute, the Adam Mickiewicz Institute, and the Lithuanian Cultural Institute;
- Work meetings with heads of foreign cultural and educational institutions in Spain, Germany, the Czech Republic, Poland.

The priorities of the programme activity of the Ukrainian Institute are as follows:

- Presentation of Ukrainian culture abroad;
- Ukraine's participation in the key world cultural, educational, and scientific events;
- International exchanges and mobility;
- Promotional projects;
- Support for Ukrainian Studies;
- Teaching and promoting the Ukrainian language abroad;
- Research platform.

== Activity ==
The work of the Ukrainian Institute is divided into sectors: cinema, music, visual arts, literature, performing arts, academic projects and programs, image projects and programs, development of cultural diplomacy and research

Among the programs and projects organized by the Ukrainian Institute are:

- Month of Cultural Diplomacy of Ukraine in Wikipedia (jointly with the Ministry of Foreign Affairs of Ukraine and the NGO "Wikimedia Ukraine")
- International Forum of Cultural Diplomacy (jointly with the Ministry of Foreign Affairs of Ukraine)
- Women in Arts Award (jointly with UN Women)
- Ukraine in two Minutes (together with Internews Ukraine and UkraineWorld)
- Ukrainian souvenir

In July 2020, in cooperation with the Ministry of Foreign Affairs of Ukraine, a series of discussions was held on cultural diplomacy and the strategy of the Ukrainian Institute.

=== Ukrainian Jazz Prize ===
In November 2025 the Ukrainian Institute, together with the Europe Jazz Network, established the Ukrainian Jazz Prize, an annual award intended to recognise Ukrainian jazz musicians and to support their international development. The prize is awarded in two categories: Best Ukrainian Jazz Band and Best Ukrainian Jazz Album Release. In 2025 the Grand Prix for Best Ukrainian Jazz Band was awarded to the Kyiv-based fusion group Hyphen Dash, while the award for Best Ukrainian Jazz Album Release went to Unnatural Root by Hilarious Disasters.

== Team ==
Director General

Volodymyr Sheiko is a specialist in culture management, marketing and communications. For 11 years, he held senior positions in the Ukrainian mission of the British Council. Organizer of numerous cultural projects and events in the UK and 15 European countries: exhibitions, art residencies, film festivals, professional internships, concerts, literary programs, trainings, theater productions. A graduate of the Institute of International Relations of the Taras Shevchenko National University of Kyiv. In 2009, received a professional diploma in marketing, and in 2014, a diploma in digital marketing from the Chartered Institute of Marketing (UK). In 2011, he graduated from the Summer School of Scottish Universities SUISS in the field of "Contemporary British and Irish Literature" (Edinburgh, Scotland). Member of the 2016 Summer School of Global Governance and member of the international network of Bucerius Summer School (ZEIT-Stiftung, Hamburg, Germany). Member of the IETM International Professional Performing Arts Network and the Total Theater Network.

Creative Director

Tetyana Filevska is a specialist in the field of contemporary art.

Executive Director

Nataliya Neniuchenko. She got many years of civil service experience.

Programme Director

Iryna Prokofieva is a specialist in project management, organisational development, and international cooperation.

Communications Director

Tetyana Oliynyk

Deputy Director General

Alim Aliev. Journalist, human rights activist, researcher and manager of educational and cultural projects.

- Programme department
- Communications department
- Information and analytical department
- Finance department
- Legal department
- Аdministrative department
- Procurement department

== Supervisory Board ==
The Supervisory Board is an advisory body that contributes to governance of the Ukrainian Institutes by helping define its priorities, manage assets and monitor implementation of statutory objectives. The Supervisory Board includes representatives of four Ministries as well as prominent Ukrainian artists, culture managers and civil society actors:

- Andriy Vitrenko – deputy Minister of Education and Science of Ukraine
- Emine Dzheppa – first Deputy Minister for Foreign Affairs of Ukraine
- Volodymyr Yermolenko – director of European projects of Internews Ukraine NGO, journalist, philosopher, writer

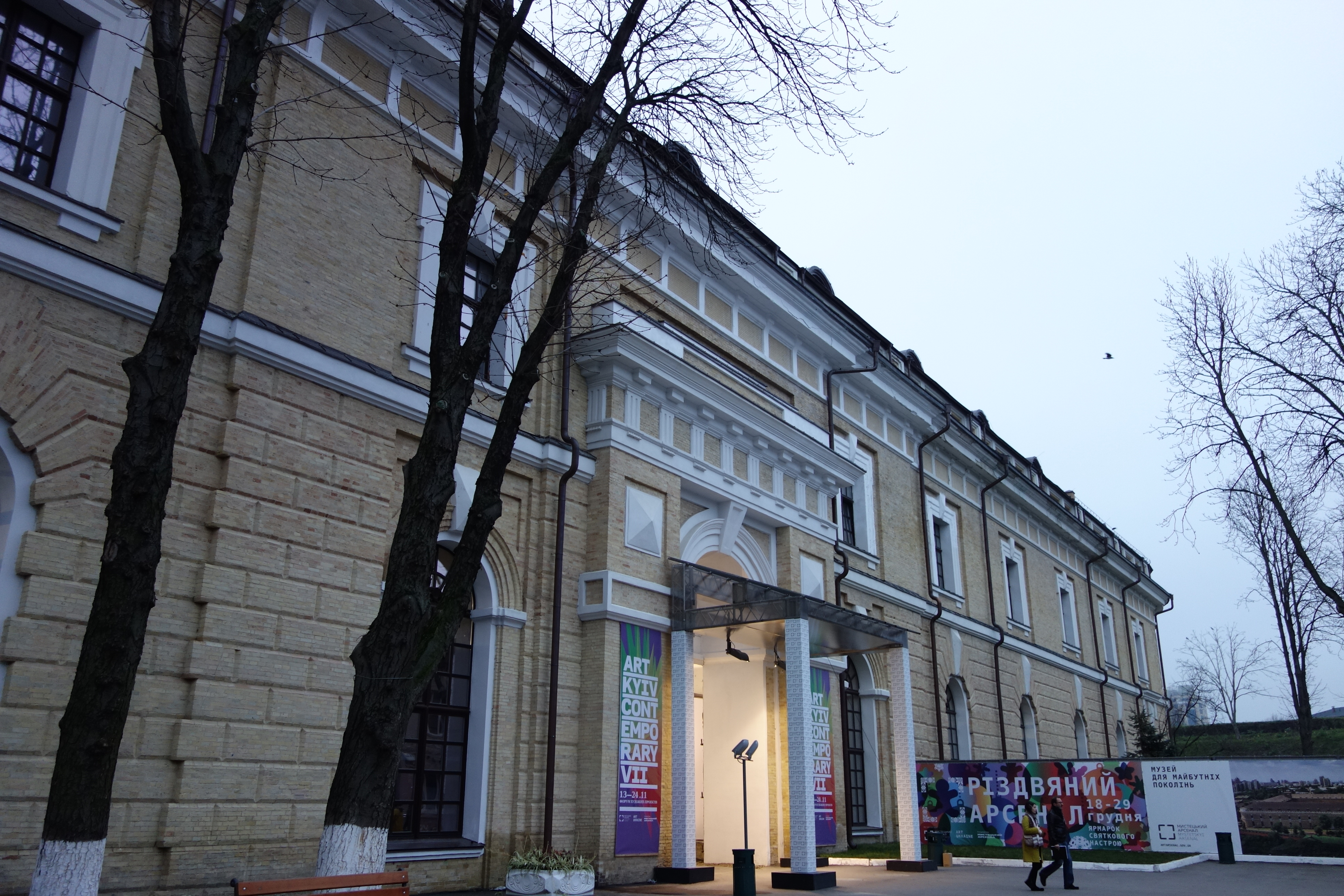
Mystetskyi Arsenal National Art and Culture Museum Complex

- Liliya Mlynarych – Head of the Supervisory Board President of the Koktebel Jazz Festival
- Olesia Ostrovska-Liuta – Director General of "Mystetskyi Arsenal" National Cultural and Art and Museum Complex
- Iryna Podoliak – Politician
- Nataliya Popovych – President of One Philosophy Group of Companies, co-founder of Ukrainian Crisis Media Center and Ukrainian Leadership Academy, communications expert
- Olga Sagaidak – Dofa fund Co-founder, Head of the Interregional Cultural Forums Project, Art critic
- Akhtem Seitablayev- Film director, actor, director of Crimean House
- Roman Sushchenko- Journalist, Ukrinform correspondent
- Tamila Tasheva- Co-founder and Chairwoman of NGO "CrimeaSOS"(КримSOS), human rights defender, civil society activist
- Svitlana Fomenko- First Deputy Minister of Culture of Ukraine
