= ManSound =

ManSound (Ukrainian: МенСаунд) is a Ukrainian male vocal sextet. The sextet was founded in 1994 in Kyiv, Ukraine. They first started touring in 1996 in the stylistic model of the African-American vocal group Take 6 in English and Ukrainian.

ManSound took part to more than 50 jazz festivals, performed three times at the Lionel Hampton Jazz Festival in the United States. The All American Entertainment Awards nominated ManSound as best vocal group in 2001. In 2002 ManSound won the First Prize at the international competition for a cappella groups Vokal Total. In 2004 the Contemporary A Cappella Society (CASA) awarded the famous jazz standard arranged by Vladimir Mikhnovetsky Best Vocal Performance in the world in the style of jazz.

== Members ==
- Volodymyr Sukhin - tenor
- Ruben Tolmachev - bass
- Yuri Romensky - tenor
- Vyacheslav Rubel - baritone
- Serhiy Kharchenko - tenor
- Vilen Kilchenko - tenor

== Discography ==
- Slavic Roots (2003)
- If It's Magic (2004)
- Himn Ukrayiny (Гімн України) (2006)
- Joy to the World (2006)
- Pid Oblachkom (Під облачком) (2007)
- VOYAGE (2008)
- Acapellissimo (2012)
