= The Voice Kids (Ukrainian TV series) season 4 =

The Voice Kids
- Season 4
- Presented by: Kateryna Osadcha; Yuri Gorbunov
- Coaches: Tina Karol; Potap; Natalia Mohylevska
- Winner: Daneliya Tuleshova
- Winning mentor: Monatik
- Runners-up: Elizaveta Yakovenko and Alexander Minyonok

Release
- Original network: 1+1
- Original release: 5 November – 17 December 2017

Season chronology
- ← Previous; Season 3 Next → Season 5

The fourth season of The Voice Kids is a Ukrainian reality singing show competition on 1+1. Dmitriy Monatik returned to the show as coach. Natalia Mogilevskaya returned to the show after a one-year absence. Aleksey Zavgorodniy and Nadya Dorofeeva shared the third coach position under their band name Vremya i Steklo. The show was hosted by Yuri Gorbunov and Katerina Osadcha.

The show premiered on 5 November 2017. There were 7 episodes. The finale aired on 17 December 2017

== Coaches ==
– Winning coach/contestant. Winners are in bold, eliminated contestants in small font.
– Runner-up coach/contestant. Final contestant first listed.
- Third Place coach/contestant. Final contestant first listed.

Judges/coaches
Natalia Mogilevskaya	Vremya i Steklo	Monatik
– Elizaveta Yakovenko – Katerina Manuzina	– Alexander Minyonok – Yana Gornaya	– **Daneliya Tuleshova** – Nino Basilaya

== Teams ==
Colour key

- Winner
- Runner-up
- Third Place
- Eliminated in the final
- Eliminated in the Live Playoffs
- Eliminated in the Battle rounds

Coaches	Top 36 artists			
Natalia Mogilevskaya				
Natalia Mogilevskaya	Elizaveta Yakovenko	Katerina Manuzina	Ernest Gogia	Maria Ermakova
Natalia Mogilevskaya	Timofey Bazarenkov	Katerina Kolomiytseva	Anna Kalyuzhnaya	Yaroslav Andrusyak
Natalia Mogilevskaya	Ilya Popadchenko	Valeria Furman	Danica Salyuk	Maria Polischuk
Vremya i Steklo				
Vremya i Steklo	Alexander Minyonok	Yana Gornaya	Sofia Lozina	Alexander Guk
Vremya i Steklo	Angelina Shimkova	Orest Makarenko	Igor Levitsky	Eva Leopa
Vremya i Steklo	Veronika Chernaya	Egor Gorlov	Maria-Daniela Trakhtenberg	Polina Pilkh
Monatik				
Monatik	Daneliya Tuleshova	Nino Basilaya	Veronika Kovalenko	Denis Dovirak & Svyatoslav Stefjuk
Monatik	Kristina Zhukovskaya	Alexandra Mazur	Vladislava Smalyana	Darina Krasnovetskaya
Monatik	Kasinia Boyko	Elizaveta Kalinina	Polina Pavlyuschenko	Darina Chernaya

== Blind auditions ==
During the Blind auditions, each coach must now form a team of 12 young artists.

It aired from 5 November

Color key

✔	Coach hit his/her "I WANT YOU" button
	Artist defaulted to this coach's team
	Artist elected to join this coach's team
	Artist eliminated with no coach pressing his or her "I WANT YOU" button

=== Episode 1 (5 November) ===
Order	Artist	Age	Hometown	Song	Coach's and contestant's choices		
Order	Artist	Age	Hometown	Song	Natalia Mogilevskaya	Vremya i Steklo	Monatik
1	Alexander Guk	12	Ivano-Frankivsk Oblast	"The Show Must Go On"	✔	✔	✔
2	Veronika Kovalenko	13	Kyiv	"Tayet Lod"	✔	✔	✔
3	Danica Salyuk	9	Vinnytsia	"Dudka"	✔	-	✔
4	Ivan Starikov	11	Chernushka	"Zhizn' prodolzhayetsya"	-	-	-
5	Sofia Lozina	13	Kyiv	"Human"	✔	✔	✔
6	Dmitry Chakun	13	Kalynivka	"One Way Ticket"	-	-	-
7	Valeria Furman	14	Kryvyi Rih	"Dolynoyu"	✔	✔	-
8	Anna Chesnova	8	Kyiv	"Kafel'"	-	-	-
9	Denis Dovirak & Svyatoslav Stefjuk	13	Ivano-Frankivsk Oblast	"Thinking Out Loud"	✔	✔	✔
10	Sofia Zaykina	8	Kyiv	"Non, je ne regrette rien"	-	-	-
11	Maria-Daniela Trakhtenberg	14	Kyiv	"Runnin'"	✔	✔	-
12	Ernest Gogia	13	Yuzhnoukrainsk	"Materynsʹka lyubov"	✔	✔	-
13	Daneliya Tuleshova	10	Almaty, Kazakhstan	"Stone Cold"	✔	✔	✔

The performance by Daneliya Tuleshova was acclaimed by Natalia Mogilevskaya as the best performance in the history of The Voice Kids Ukraine. It got 6 million views and 9000 comments on YouTube within one month.

=== Episode 2 ( 12 November) ===
Order	Artist	Age	Hometown	Song	Coach's and contestant's choices		
Order	Artist	Age	Hometown	Song	Natalia Mogilevskaya	Vremya i Steklo	Monatik
1	Orest Makarenko	7	Chernihiv	"YA i Sara"	-	✔	-
2	Alexander Minyonok	14	Minsk	"Grenade"	✔	✔	✔
3	Veronika Chernaya	13	Oleksandriia	"Choven"	✔	✔	✔
4	Anna Kalyuzhnaya	11	Minsk	"Unstoppable"	✔	-	-
5	Maria Ermakova	10	Minsk	"Summertime"	✔	✔	✔
6	Evgeny Pervukhin	9	Kramatorsk	"Tri belykh konya"	-	-	-
7	Vladislava Smalyana	13	Chornomorsk	"Tvoyi hrikhy"	-	✔	✔
8	Arman Arakelyan	12	Chmelnyzkyj	"Vozle doma tvoyego"	-	-	-
9	Kasinia Boyko	13	Tschornomorsk	"Vilʹnyy ptakh"	-	-	✔
10	Egor Gorlov	12	Netishyn	"Podolyanochka"	✔	✔	✔
11	Daniel Okaro	14	Odesa	"7 Years"	-	-	-
12	Egor Dudko	13		"Whataya Want from Me"	-	-	-
13	Elizaveta Yakovenko	14	Lutsk	"I Put a Spell on You"	✔	✔	✔

=== Episode 3 (19 November) ===
Order	Artist	Age	Hometown	Song	Coach's and contestant's choices		
Order	Artist	Age	Hometown	Song	Natalia Mogilevskaya	Vremya i Steklo	Monatik
1	Yaroslav Andrusyak	11	Ivano-Frankivsk Oblast	"YA pidu v daleki hory"	✔	-	-
2	Yana Gornaya	12	Sevastopol	"Soon We'll Be Found"	✔	✔	✔
3	Eva Bulenok	8	Khmelnytskyi, Ukraine	"Old MacDonald"	-	-	-
4	Kristina Zhukovskaya	14	Cherkasy	"Oy ti, zhavoronku"	-	✔	✔
5	Darina Chernaya	14	Kyiv Oblast	"Zamanyly"	-	-	✔
6	Daniil Polyakov	6	Mogilev	"Ptitsa schast'ya"	-	-	-
7	Igor Levitsky	13	Drohobych	"Beggin'"	-	✔	-
8	Maria Polischuk	7	Kyiv	"History Repeating"	✔	-	-
9	Ilya Popadchenko	13	Prudjanka	"Vitchyzna"	✔	-	-
10	Karina Zaets	11		"Kupala"	-	-	-
11	Anna Klimenko	7	Berezan	"Ridnyy kray"	-	-	-
12	Polina Pavlyuschenko	9	Minsk	"Kukushka"	-	-	✔
13	Eva Leopa	11	Kremenchuk	"Ne zabuvay"	✔	✔	✔

=== Episode 4 (26 November) ===
Order	Artist	Age	Hometown	Song	Coach's and contestant's choices		
Order	Artist	Age	Hometown	Song	Natalia Mogilevskaya	Vremya i Steklo	Monatik
1	Elizaveta Kalinina	10	Odesa	"Listen"	✔	-	✔
2	Elina Pogorelaya & Maria Boyko	14		"Kudy meni vpadaty dali"	-	-	-
3	Sofia Shkidchenko	11		"What Does the Fox Say?"	-	-	-
4	Darina Krasnovetskaya	10	Vinnytsia	"1944"	-	-	✔
5	Angelina Shimkova	14	Horodok	"Khto yak ne ty"	-	✔	-
6	Timofey Bazarenkov	11	Zaporizhia	"Kolyskova"	✔	-	-
7	Nino Basilaya	13	Kyiv	"When We Were Young"	✔	✔	✔
8	Polina Pilkh	12	Dnipro	"Cheap Thrills"	-	✔	-
9	Muayad Abdel'rakhim	12	Odesa	"Earth Song"	-	Team Full	-
10	Vladislava Konovalyuk	11	Khmelnytskyi	"History Repeating"	-	Team Full	-
11	Alexandra Mazur	10	Kamyenyets	"Ty do mene ne khody"	-	Team Full	✔
12	Katerina Filvarok	8	Kolomyia	"Verbovaya doshchechka"	-	Team Full	Team Full
13	Katerina Manuzina	12	Bila Tserkva	"Oy, lyuli"	✔	Team Full	Team Full
14	Darya Komova	6	Kherson	"Shalandy, polnyye kefali"	-	Team Full	Team Full
15	Katerina Kolomiytseva	13	Kryvyi Rih	"Milord"	✔	Team Full	Team Full

== The Battle rounds ==
After the Blind Auditions, each coach had twelve contestants for the Battle rounds. Coaches begin narrowing down the playing field by training the contestants. Each battle concluding with the respective coach eliminating two of the three contestants; the four winners for each coach advanced to the Knockouts.

Color key

Artist won the Battle and advances to the Knockouts
Artist lost the Battle and was eliminated

=== Episode 5 (3 December) ===
Order	Coach	Winner	Song	Losers	
1	Vremya i Steklo	Sofia Lozina	"Believer"	Igor Levitsky	Maria-Daniela Trakhtenberg
2	Natalia Mogilevskaya	Ernest Gogia	"Rockabye"	Anna Kalyuzhnaya	Danica Salyuk
3	Monatik	Veronika Kovalenko	"Vidpravyla mesedzh"	Vladislava Smalyana	Polina Pavlyuschenko
4	Vremya i Steklo	Yana Gornaya	"Na rajonie"	Orest Makarenko	Egor Gorlov
5	Monatik	Daneliya Tuleshova	"Of the Night"	Kristina Zhukovskaya	Kasinia Boyko
6	Natalia Mogilevskaya	Maria Ermakova	"Smile"	Yaroslav Andrusyak	Maria Polischuk
7	Vremya i Steklo	Alexander Guk	"U doli svoya vesna"	Eva Leopa	Polina Pilkh
8	Natalia Mogilevskaya	Elizaveta Yakovenko	"Na nebi"	Timofey Bazarenkov	Ilya Popadchenko
9	Vremya i Steklo	Alexander Minyonok	"Oy u hayu pry Dunayu"	Angelina Shimkova	Veronika Chernaya
10	Monatik	Denis Dovirak & Svyatoslav Stefjuk	"Maria Maria"	Darina Krasnovetskaya	Darina Chernaya
11	Natalia Mogilevskaya	Katerina Manuzina	"Faded"	Katerina Kolomiytseva	Valeria Furman
12	Monatik	Nino Basilaya	"Imya 505"	Alexandra Mazur	Elizaveta Kalinina

== Knockouts ==
Color key:

Artist was saved by his/her coach
Artist was eliminated

=== Episode 6 (10 December) ===
Coach	Order	Artist	Song
Vremya i Steklo	1	Alexander Minyonok	"Zakryly tvoi ochi"
Vremya i Steklo	2	Alexander Guk	"Still Loving You"
Vremya i Steklo	3	Sofia Lozina	"Goĭda-goĭda"
Vremya i Steklo	4	Yana Gornaya	"Set Fire to the Rain"
Monatik	1	Veronika Kovalenko	"Na stile"
Monatik	2	Daneliya Tuleshova	"Rise Up"
Monatik	3	Denis Dovirak & Svyatoslav Stefjuk	"Kraina Mriy"
Monatik	4	Nino Basilaya	"Inyye"
Natalia Mogilevskaya	1	Maria Ermakova	"Run to You"
Natalia Mogilevskaya	2	Ernest Gogia	"Can't Stop the Feeling!"
Natalia Mogilevskaya	3	Elizaveta Yakovenko	"Maybe I, Maybe You"
Natalia Mogilevskaya	4	Katerina Manuzina	"Hello"

== Final ==
=== Episode 7 (December 17) ===
==== Round 1 ====
In this phase of the competition, each of the top six finalists took the stage and performed a solo song. The television audience choose the final three artists who advanced to the next round.

Color key:

Artist advanced to Round 2 by audience choice
Artist was eliminated

Coach	Order	Artist	Song
Vremya i Steklo	1	Yana Gornaya	"La La La"
Vremya i Steklo	2	Alexander Minyonok	"Oma"
Natalia Mogilevskaya	3	Katerina Manuzina	"Dernière_danse"
Natalia Mogilevskaya	4	Elizaveta Yakovenko	"Nochen'ka"
Monatik	5	Nino Basilaya	"Perechekaty"
Monatik	6	Daneliya Tuleshova	"Spectrum"

There were four performances between round one and two, which were not part of the competition. Each coach performed with their two candidates. Also, Monatik performed a song "Batka" he has specifically composed for this competition.

Non-competition performances
Order	Performer	Song
1	Vremya i Steklo, Yana Gornaya, Alexander Minyonok	"Troll'"
2	Monatik, Nino Basilaya, Daneliya Tuleshova	"Mudryye derev'ya"
3	Natalia Mogilevskaya, Katerina Manuzina, Elizaveta Yakovenko	"Misyatsʹ"
4	Monatik and participants of the 4th season	"Batka"

==== Round 2 ====
The final round of the competition featured the top three finalists performed a solo song. Before the start of the performances, voting lines were opened live-in-show for the television audience to vote for the final three and decide the winner. The winner of The Voice Kids was announced at the end of the show. In addition to the title the winner received a one-week vacation at Disneyland Paris for two persons and a three-month rotation of their songs on Nashe Radio

Order	Artist	Song	Result
1	Alexander Minyonok	"Let's Get It Started"	Runner-up
2	Elizaveta Yakovenko	"Set Fire to the Rain"	Third Place
3	Daneliya Tuleshova	"Ne tvoya viyna"	Winner
