= The Voice Kids (Ukrainian TV series) season 5 =

The Voice Kids
- Season 5
- Hosted by: Kateryna Osadcha
- Coaches: Jamala; Vremya i Steklo; Dzidzio
- Winner: Oleksandr Zazarashvili
- Winning coach: Vremya i Steklo
- Runners-up: Varvara Koshova & Yaroslav Karpuk

Release
- Original network: 1+1
- Original release: May 26 – July 7, 2019

Season chronology
- ← Previous; Season 4

The fifth season, of The Voice Kids, a Ukrainian reality singing show competition, premiered on May 26, 2019 on 1+1. Returning coaches Aleksey Zavgorodniy and Nadya Dorofeeva of Vremya i Steklo, who share a mentor chair, are joined by new coaches Jamala and Dzidzio.

== Coaches ==
– Winning coach/contestant. Winners are in bold, eliminated contestants in small font.
– Runner-up coach/contestant. Final contestant first listed.
– Third place coach/contestant. Final contestant first listed.

Judges/coaches
Jamala	Vremya i Steklo	Dzidzio
Varvara Koshova; Nikita Achkasov	**Oleksandr Zazarashvyli**; Karina Stolaba	Yaroslav Karpuk; Veronika Morska

== Teams ==
Colour key

- Winner
- Runner-up
- Third place
- Eliminated in the Final: Round 1
- Eliminated in the Live Playoffs
- Eliminated in the Battle rounds

Coaches	Top 36 artists			
Dzidzio				
Dzidzio	Yaroslav Karpuk	Veronika Morska	Sophia Vinnyk	Yaroslav Rogalskyi
Dzidzio	Nadiya Verkhovska	Daryna Vitsan	Julia Karimi	Maksym Ustyansky
Dzidzio	Lyana Andreasyan	Sophiya Yarova	Kira Polonska	Bohdan Petrovskyi
Vremya i Steklo				
Vremya i Steklo	Oleksandr Zazarashvyli	Karina Stolaba	Taisia Skomorokhova	Darya Buhaychuk
Vremya i Steklo	Mariya Mahilnaya	Adelina Iordachi	Polina Babiy	Elizaveta Andreyko
Vremya i Steklo	Maksym Komisarchuk	Sophiya Byshova	Monika Hlazer	David Krasylyuk
Jamala				
Jamala	Varvara Koshova	Nikita Achkasov	Nadya Dovbush	Yaroslav Politov
Jamala	Artem Shoyzholov	Angelina Terennikova	Yeseniya Selyeznova	Maksym Davidyuk
Jamala	Sophiya Ivanko	Anna Vladova	Egor Umanets	Elizaveta Kirilyuk

== Blind auditions ==
The Blind Buditions aired from May 26, 2019. During the Blind auditions, each coach must form a team of 12 young artists.

=== Episode 1 (May 26) ===
The coaches performed "Sercem ty vidchuj lyubov" at the start of the show.

Order	Artist	Age	Song	Coach's and contestant's choices		
Order	Artist	Age	Song	Jamala	Vremya i Steklo	Dzidzio
1	Yaroslav Politov	12	"Sound of Silence"	✔	✔	✔
2	Taisia Skomorokhova, Russia	7	"Simply the best"	✔	✔	✔
3	Bohdan Petrovskyi	14	"Zakryly tvoyi ochi"	✔	✔	✔
4	Maksym Ustyansky	11	"Den Narodzhennia"	-	-	✔
5	Julia Karimi	12	"A Little Party Never Killed Nobody"	✔	✔	✔
6	Mariya Mahilnaya, Belarus	14	"UVLYUVT"	✔	✔	✔
7	Maksym Davidyuk	11	"Hurt"	✔	✔	✔
8	Valeriya Tkachuk	8	"Imya 505"	-	-	-
9	Yaroslav Karpuk	13	"Can't Help Falling in Love"	✔	✔	✔
10	Duet "Kryla" (Darya Artyemchuk & Veronika Kolomoytseva)	11 & 11	"Na Ivana, na Kupayla"	-	-	-
11	Sophia Vinnyk	11	"Chekayu. Ts'om"	✔	✔	✔
12	Darya Buhaychuk	10	"Antarktyda"	✔	✔	✔
13	Oleksandr Zazarashvyli, Georgia	12	"All by Myself"	✔	✔	✔

=== Episode 2 (June 2) ===
Order	Artist	Age	Song	Coach's and contestant's choices		
Order	Artist	Age	Song	Jamala	Vremya i Steklo	Dzidzio
1	Artem Shoyzholov	13	"Uptown Funk"	✔	-	✔
2	Monika Hlazer	9	"Hallelujah""	✔	✔	✔
3	Mayramik Avoyan	14	"Vodohray"	-	-	-
4	Sophiya Byshova	12	"River"	✔	✔	✔
5	Veronika Morska	7	"Syla"	-	-	✔
6	Maksym Komisarchuk	14	"Perfect"	-	✔	✔
7	Bohdana Shkolnaya	10	"Bird Set Free"	-	-	-
8	Adelina Iordachi, Moldova	13	"Mamma Knows Best"	✔	✔	✔
9	Artur Halas	11	"De by ya"	-	-	-
10	Kira Polonska	10	"Okeanami Stali"	-	-	✔
11	Egor Umanets	11	"Slyakh Dodomu"	✔	-	-
12	Sophiya Ivanko	13	"Zombie"	✔	✔	✔
13	Daryna Vitsan	8	"Kvitka Dusha"	✔		✔

=== Episode 3 (June 9) ===
Order	Artist	Age	Song	Coach's and contestant's choices		
Order	Artist	Age	Song	Jamala	Vremya i Steklo	Dzidzio
1	Yeseniya Selyeznova	8	"Chinchilla"	✔	-	✔
2	Nikita Achkasov	12	"Can You Feel the Love Tonight"	✔	✔	✔
3	Elizaveta Kirilyuk	10	"Misto"	✔	-	-
4	Valeriya Nyzova	10	"Just Give Me a Reason"	-	-	-
5	Karina Stolaba	14	"Cryin'"	✔	✔	✔
6	Misha Ekymov, Belarus	9	"Razhovor so schastem"	-	-	-
7	Lyana Andreasyan, Armenia	14	"Plakala"	-	-	✔
8	Anastasiia Yeromenko	13	"My Heart Will Go On"	-	-	-
9	Angelina Terennikova	13	"TDME"	✔	-	✔
10	David Krasylyuk	10	"California Dreamin'"	-	✔	-
11	Nadiya Verkhovska	14	"Back to Black"	-	-	✔
12	Olena Usenko	11	"Na style"	-	-	-
13	Varvara Koshova	11	"Fall in Line"	✔	✔	✔

=== Episode 4 (June 16) ===
Order	Artist	Age	Song	Coach's and contestant's choices		
Order	Artist	Age	Song	Jamala	Vremya i Steklo	Dzidzio
1	Elizaveta Andreyko	12	"Toy"	-	✔	-
2	Vardan Margaryan, Armenia	9	"Faith"	-	-	-
3	Veronika Subyuk	13	"Fortepiano"	-	-	-
4	Nadya Dovbush	10	"When Love Takes Over"	✔	✔	✔
5	Alina Valuyska	14	"Killing Me Softly with His Song"	-	-	-
6	Polina Babiy	9	"Can't Buy Me Love"	✔	✔	-
7	Anastasiya Palamar	14	"The Show Must Go On"	-	Team Full	-
8	Anna Vladova	13	"People Help the People"	✔	Team Full	-
9	Katerina Lodkina	12	"Krila"	Team Full	Team Full	-
10	Oleksandr Balabanov	12	"Earth Song"	Team Full	Team Full	✔
11	Yaroslav Rogalskiy	13	"Chorni Chereshni"	Team Full	Team Full	✔
12	Yuliya Ivasiv	13	"Spi sobi sama"	Team Full	Team Full	-
13	Ekaterina Balitskaya	13	"Somebody to Love"	Team Full	Team Full	-
14	Sophiya Yarova	9	"Oy u vishnevomu sadu"	Team Full	Team Full	✔

== The Battle rounds ==
After the Blind Auditions, each coach had twelve contestants for the Battle rounds. Coaches begin narrowing down the playing field by training the contestants. Each battle concluding with the respective coach eliminating two of the three contestants; the four winners for each coach advanced to the Knockouts.

Color key

Artist won the Battle and advances to the Knockouts
Artist lost the Battle and was eliminated

=== Episode 5 (June 23) ===
Order	Coach	Winner	Song	Eliminated	
1	Jamala	Nadya Dovbush	"La La La"	Yeseniya Selyeznova	Egor Umanets
2	Dzidzio	Veronika Morska	"Zeleneye zhyto"	Daryna Vitsan	Sophiya Yarova
3	Vremya i Steklo	Karina Stolaba	"Ain't My Fault"	Adelina Iordachi	Sophiya Byshova
4	Dzidzio	Yaroslav Karpuk	"Gutsulka Ksenya"	Nadiya Verkhovska	Lyana Andreasyan
5	Jamala	Nikita Achkasov	"7 Rings"	Angelina Terennikova	Anna Vladova
6	Vremya i Steklo	Taisia Skomorokhova	"Show Me Your Love"	Polina Babiy	Monika Hlazer
7	Dzidzio	Sophia Vinnyk	"Naykrashchyy den"	Julia Karimi	Kira Polonska
8	Jamala	Yaroslav Politov	"Mercy"	Maksym Davidyuk	Elizaveta Kirilyuk
9	Vremya i Steklo	Oleksandr Zazarashvyli	"Halo"	Mariya Mahilnaya	Maksym Komisarchuk
10	Dzidzio	Yaroslav Rogalskiy	"Love It Ritm"	Maksym Ustyansky	Bohdan Petrovskyi
11	Vremya i Steklo	Darya Buhaychuk	"Promin"	Elizaveta Andreyko	David Krasylyuk
12	Jamala	Varvara Koshova	"Dim"	Artem Shoyzholov	Sophiya Ivanko

== Knockouts ==
Color key:

Artist was saved by his/her coach
Artist was eliminated

=== Episode 6 (June 30) ===
Coach	Order	Artist	Song
Dzidzio	1	Yaroslav Karpuk	"Dva Kolori"
Dzidzio	2	Sophia Vinnyk	"My Kind of Love"
Dzidzio	3	Yaroslav Rogalskiy	"Morkye Krossy"
Dzidzio	4	Veronika Morska	"You Raise Me Up"
Jamala	5	Nikita Achkasov	"Never Enough"
Jamala	6	Nadya Dovbush	"Trimay"
Jamala	7	Yaroslav Politov	"Vyhadav"
Jamala	8	Varvara Koshova	"Call Out My Name"
Vremya i Steklo	9	Darya Buhaychuk	"Dangerous Woman"
Vremya i Steklo	10	Taisia Skomorokhova	"Ulybaysya"
Vremya i Steklo	11	Karina Stolaba	"Million Reasons"
Vremya i Steklo	12	Oleksandr Zazarashvyli	"Who's Lovin' You"

== Final ==
=== Episode 7 (July 7) ===
==== Round 1 ====
In this phase of the competition, each of the top six finalists took the stage and performed a solo song. The television audience choose the final three artists who advanced to the next round. Color key:

Artist advanced to Round 2 by audience choice
Artist was eliminated

Coach	Order	Artist	Song
Dzidzio	1	Veronika Morska	"Mamma Mia"
Dzidzio	2	Yaroslav Karpuk	"Arcade"
Jamala	3	Varvara Koshova	"Kryla"
Jamala	4	Nikita Achkasov	"Your Song"
Vremya i Steklo	5	Karina Stolaba	"Nebo"
Vremya i Steklo	6	Oleksandr Zazarashvyli	Maksym Komisarchuk

Non-competition performances
Order	Performer	Song
1	Netta, Veronika Morska, Yaroslav Karpuk, Karina Stolaba, Oleksandr Zazarashvyli, Nikita Achkasov, Varvara Koshova Maksym Komisarchuk	"Toy"
2	Dzidzio, Veronika Morska, Yaroslav Karpuk	"Ya I Sara"
3	Kazka	"Pisnya smilyvykh divchat"
4	Jamala, Varvara Koshova, Nikita Achkasov	"Rybki"
5	The Hardkiss	"Sertse"
6	Vremya i Steklo, Karina Stolaba, Oleksandr Zazarashvyli Maksym Komisarchuk	"Lyudy Yak Korabli"
7	Michelle Andrade	"Tranquila"
8	Jamala	"Solo"
9	Monatik, Daneliya Tuleshova	"Dobegi"
10	Netta	"Nana Banana"

==== Round 2 ====
The final round of the competition featured the top three finalists performed a solo song. Before the start of the performances, voting lines were opened live-in-show for the television audience to vote for the final three and decide the winner. The winner of The Voice Kids was announced at the end of the show.

Order	Artist	Song	Result
1	Yaroslav Karpuk	"Can't Help Falling in Love"	Runner-up
2	Varvara Koshova	"Fall in Line"	Third place
3	Oleksandr Zazarashvyli	"All by Myself"	Winner
