= The Voice Kids (Ukrainian TV series) season 3 =

The Voice Kids
- Season 3
- Presented by: Kateryna Osadcha; Yuri Gorbunov
- Coaches: Tina Karol; Potap; Natalia Mohylevska
- Winner: Elina Ivashchenko
- Winning mentor: Tina Karol
- Runners-up: Ivanna Reshko and Vlad Fenichko

Release
- Original network: 1+1
- Original release: 2 October – 4 December 2016

Season chronology
- ← Previous; Season 2 Next → Season 4

The third season of The Voice Kids is Ukrainian reality singing show competition on 1+1. Tina Karol and Potap returned to the show as coaches. Natalia Mogilevskaya left the show, because she didn't win previous season. As a result, Dmitriy Monatik replaced her as a coach. The show premiered on October 2, 2016. It aired at 9:00 p.m. (EET) every Sunday.

== Coaches ==
– Winning coach/contestant. Winners are in bold, eliminated contestants in small font.
– Runner-up coach/contestant. Final contestant first listed.
- Third Place coach/contestant. Final contestant first listed.

Judges/coaches
| Potap | Tina Karol | Monatik |
|---|---|---|
| – Ivanna Reshko – İvan Yastrebov | – **Elina Ivashchenko** – Oleksandr Podolian | – Vlad Fenichko – Andriy Boyko |

== Blind auditions ==
During the Blind auditions, each coach must now form a team of 18 young artists.

It airs from October 2.

Color key

| ✔ | Coach hit his/her "I WANT YOU" button |
| | Artist defaulted to this coach's team |
| | Artist elected to join this coach's team |
| | Artist eliminated with no coach pressing his or her "I WANT YOU" button |

=== Episode 1 (October 2) ===
| Order | Artist | Age | Hometown | Song | Coach's and contestant's choices | | |
| Order | Artist | Age | Hometown | Song | Potap | Tina | Monatik |
|---|---|---|---|---|---|---|---|
| 1 | Andriy Boyko | 13 | Vyshneve | "I Surrender" | ✔ | ✔ | ✔ |
| 2 | Tatiana Akekseenko | 10 | Vinnytsya | "Kukushka" | ✔ | ✔ | ✔ |
| 3 | Ester Freedman | 12 | Tel Aviv | "Sunny" | – | – | – |
| 4 | Kirill Chepirta | 12 | Bucha | "It's Man's World" | ✔ | - | ✔ |
| 5 | Oliya Garbuziuk | 7 | Kyiv | "Tutti-Frutti" | - | ✔ | ✔ |
| 6 | Katia Sviato | 12 | Abu Dhabi | "Habanera: Act I, Aria (Carmen Suite No.2)" | - | - | - |
| 7 | Ivan Yastrebov | 13 | Moscow | "Dorogoi Dlinnoyu" | ✔ | - | ✔ |
| 8 | Erik Mkrtchan | 10 | Kharkiv | "Mamma Knows Best" | ✔ | - | ✔ |
| 9 | Anna Mkrtchan | 8 | Kharkiv | "Shady Lady" | - | ✔ | - |
| 10 | Marina Fregan | 14 | Sokyryntsi, Ternopil Oblast | "And I'm Telling You I'm Not Going" | - | - | - |
| 11 | Karina Solod | 10 | Cherkasy | "Cheremshina" | - | - | - |
| 12 | Katrina-Paula Diringa | 10 | Riga | "Je t'aime" | ✔ | ✔ | ✔ |

=== Episode 2 (October 9) ===
| Order | Artist | Age | Hometown | Song | Coach's and contestant's choices | | |
| Order | Artist | Age | Hometown | Song | Potap | Tina | Monatik |
|---|---|---|---|---|---|---|---|
| 1 | Vlad Fenichko | 13 | Poltava | "All of Me" | - | ✔ | ✔ |
| 2 | Aleksandra Mironenko | 8 | Darnytsia | "Trimaj" | - | ✔ | ✔ |
| 3 | Ruslana Moroz | 13 | Dunaivtsi | "Suus" | - | - | - |
| 4 | Valeria Lysenko | 10 | Kyiv | "From Cloud to Cloud" | - | ✔ | ✔ |
| 5 | Ivanna Reshko | 13 | Kliucharky | "Mamma Knows Best" | ✔ | ✔ | ✔ |
| 6 | Sofia Legeza | 10 | Kharkiv | "Kolomyjka" | - | - | - |
| 7 | Denis Rodin | 11 | Vovchynets | "Love Runs Out" | ✔ | - | ✔ |
| 8 | Anna Voronova | 12 | Kyiv | "Love Me Again" | ✔ | - | ✔ |
| 9 | Timoti Sannikov | 13 | Bat Yam | "Great Balls of Fire" | - | ✔ | ✔ |
| 10 | Yaroslava Prokopchuk | 9 | Hlevakha | "My Native Land" | - | - | - |
| 11 | Trio Smile (Katja, Dasha, Katrin) | 12 | Kyiv | "Umbrella" | - | ✔ | - |
| 12 | Oleksandr Podolian | 12 | Gibalivka | "Caruso" | ✔ | ✔ | ✔ |
| 13 | Yulia Nidzelska | 14 | Odesa | "Back to Black" | - | - | - |
| 14 | Dara Selo | 12 | Kyiv | "Boat" | - | - | ✔ |

=== Episode 3 (October 16) ===
| Order | Artist | Age | Hometown | Song | Coach's and contestant's choices | | |
| Order | Artist | Age | Hometown | Song | Potap | Tina | Monatik |
|---|---|---|---|---|---|---|---|
| 1 | Polina Pisarcova | 11 | Dergachi | "Na gorodu tschorna redka" | ✔ | ✔ | - |
| 2 | Anton Melnik | 14 | Kyiv | "Love Yourself" | ✔ | ✔ | ✔ |
| 3 | Ilja Bortkov | 13 | Moscow | "Can't Feel My Face" | - | - | - |
| 4 | Anastasia Tarnavska | 14 | Derazhnia | "Vedma" | - | ✔ | ✔ |
| 5 | Raffaele Papadia | 10 | Gomel, Belarus | "L'Italiano" | - | ✔ | - |
| 6 | Elizaveta Valkova | 12 | Dnipro | "Simona" | ✔ | - | - |
| 7 | Valeria Zhirkevich | 10 | Dnipro | "Golubka" | - | - | - |
| 8 | Alina Sansizbay | 8 | Almaty | "Think" | - | - | ✔ |
| 9 | Viktor Sapay | 9 | Dnipro | "Die Fledermaus" | - | - | - |
| 10 | Nadya Dovbush | 8 | Velika Korenicha | "Early" | - | ✔ | - |
| 11 | Eva Ash | 9 | Kyiv | "Papa, narisuy" | ✔ | - | ✔ |
| 12 | Olga Trashkaleva | 11 | Mykolaiv | "Love Manifest" | - | - | - |
| 13 | Varvara Koshova | 8 | Kyiv | "Wrecking Ball" | ✔ | - | - |
| 14 | Daryna Kvitchasta | 12 | Pavlohrad | "Castle in the Snow" | ✔ | ✔ | ✔ |

=== Episode 4 (October 23) ===
| Order | Artist | Age | Hometown | Song | Coach's and contestant's choices | | |
| Order | Artist | Age | Hometown | Song | Potap | Tina | Monatik |
|---|---|---|---|---|---|---|---|
| 1 | Mykhail Kiselev | 12 | Odesa | "Bez boyu" | ✔ | ✔ | ✔ |
| 2 | Polina Zagnoy | 8 | Kyiv | "Namalyuyu tobi zori" | - | ✔ | ✔ |
| 3 | Arsen Shavlyuk | 11 | Kyiv | "8 kolir" | – | – | – |
| 4 | Elina Ivashchenko | 12 | Brovary | "Za lisamy goramy" | ✔ | ✔ | ✔ |
| 5 | Emeli Moshkina | 8 | Israel | "You Raise Me Up" | - | - | - |
| 6 | Emeli Istrate | 12 | Chișinău, Moldova | "Ora din Moldova" | ✔ | ✔ | - |
| 7 | Daria Shvets | 11 | Kelmentsi | "Historia de un Amor" | - | ✔ | ✔ |
| 8 | Helin Koniar | 14 | Kyiv | "He Lives in You" | ✔ | - | - |
| 9 | Kira Kasianova | 9 | Kharkiv | "Sdatsia ty vsegda uspeesh" | - | - | - |
| 10 | Margarita Horoshun | 14 | Odesa | "Running" | ✔ | - | ✔ |
| 11 | Veronika Krizhanivska | 9 | Kyiv | "Respect" | ✔ | - | ✔ |
| 12 | Vasil Siredzhuk | 9 | Ivano-Frankivsk | "Counting Stars" | - | - | - |
| 13 | Margarita Halina | 13 | Odesa | "It's Oh So Quiet" | - | - | ✔ |
| 14 | Maria Krasnoschek | 11 | Kharkiv | "Ukraine is you" | - | ✔ | - |

=== Episode 5 (October 30) ===
| Order | Artist | Age | Hometown | Song | Coach's and contestant's choices | | |
| Order | Artist | Age | Hometown | Song | Potap | Tina | Monatik |
|---|---|---|---|---|---|---|---|
| 1 | Alisa Chudzhan | 9 | Kharkiv | "Kraina mriy" | ✔ | - | - |
| 2 | Denis Dovirak | 13 | Ivano-Frankivsk | "Feeling Good" | - | - | - |
| 3 | Liliana Kamotska | 13 | Minsk, Belarus | "Arlekino" | ✔ | ✔ | - |
| 4 | Hrystyna Galayko | 14 | Peremyshliany | "O mio babbino caro" | ✔ | ✔ | ✔ |
| 5 | Liza Kostiakina | 12 | Kyiv | "California Dreamin'" | ✔ | - | ✔ |
| 6 | Hanna Golodna | 14 | Moscow | "Nebo Londona" | - | - | ✔ |
| 7 | Dmitro Liah | 9 | Odesa | "Blue Suede Shoes" | - | - | - |
| 8 | Natalia Berest | 12 | Sumy | "Luli, luli, luli, naletilu guli" | - | ✔ | - |
| 9 | Selin Ipkin | 14 | Almaty | "Seven Nation Army" | ✔ | - | - |
| 10 | Artur Pidsoha | 13 | Kharkiv | "Volare" | - | - | - |
| 11 | Daria Ostapuk | 14 | Lutsk | "Rolling in the Deep" | - | - | ✔ |
| 12 | Anfisa Khmelevska | 11 | Minsk | "Chandelier" | ✔ | - | - |
| 13 | Elza Voskanian | 12 | Kyiv | "Try porady" | - | - | - |
| 14 | Liza Voloschenko | 10 | Kherson | "I Have Nothing" | - | ✔ | ✔ |

=== Episode 6 (November 6) ===
| Order | Artist | Age | Hometown | Song | Coach's and contestant's choices | | |
| Order | Artist | Age | Hometown | Song | Potap | Tina | Monatik |
|---|---|---|---|---|---|---|---|
| 1 | Karina Arakelian | 12 | Dnipro | "Wrecking Ball" | ✔ | Team full | ✔ |
| 2 | Liana Dolgih | 9 | Chornomorske | "Malvy" | - | Team full | - |
| 3 | Nazar Vlasiuk | 13 | Rivne | "Santa Lucia" | ✔ | Team full | - |
| 4 | Polina Chirikova | 14 | Yekaterinburg | "Bang Bang" | - | Team full | - |
| 5 | Angelina Gvadzhaya | 13 | Mogilev | "Chandelier" | - | Team full | ✔ |
| 6 | Misha Kobylkin | 12 | Svitlovodsk | "It's My Life" | - | Team full | - |
| 7 | Nadia Goncharenko | 12 | Tel Aviv | "Spy sobi sama" | - | Team full | - |
| 8 | Tali Kyper | 9 | Sumy | "History Repeating" | ✔ | Team full | ✔ |
| 9 | Hrystyna Shatskih | 14 | Kyiv | "Zhyzn prodolzhaetsia" | Team full | Team full | - |
| 10 | Anna Lysaya | 14 | Minsk | "Strange Birds" | Team full | Team full | ✔ |
| 11 | Maria Erohovets | 8 | Minsk | "Zheltye botinki" | Team full | Team full | - |
| 12 | Sofia Lys | 13 | Poltava | "Come Home" | Team full | Team full | - |
| 13 | Nino Basilaya | 12 | Kyiv | "One Night Only" | Team full | Team full | - |
| 14 | Arina Pehtereva | 8 | Mogilev | "Still Loving You" | Team full | Team full | - |
| 15 | Iulia Radchuk | 14 | Ivano-Frankivsk | "I'm Not the Only One" | Team full | Team full | ✔ |

== The Battle rounds ==
After the Blind Auditions, each coach had eighteen contestants for the Battle rounds. Coaches begin narrowing down the playing field by training the contestants. Each battle concluding with the respective coach eliminating two of the three contestants; the six winners for each coach advanced to the Knockouts.

Color key

| Artist won the Battle and advances to the Knockouts |
| Artist lost the Battle and was eliminated |

| Episode | Coach | Order | Winner | Song | Losers |
|---|---|---|---|---|---|
| Episode 7 (November 13) | Tina Karol | 1 | Mikhail | "Nas byut - my letaem" | Polina, Liliana |
| Episode 7 (November 13) | Potap | 2 | Tali | "Malenkaya devochka" | Varvara, Eva |
| Episode 7 (November 13) | Dmitriy Monatik | 3 | Erik | "Heaven" | Angelina, Margarita |
| Episode 7 (November 13) | Tina Karol | 4 | Katrina-Paula | "Papaoutai" | Rafaelle, Darya |
| Episode 7 (November 13) | Potap | 5 | Ivanna | "Nebo eto ya" | Hrystyna, Selin |
| Episode 7 (November 13) | Dmitriy Monatik | 6 | Andriy | "Sdatsia ty vsegda uspeesh" | Anna, Daria |
| Episode 7 (November 13) | Tina Karol | 7 | Olia | "My buly na seli" | Polina, Trio Smile |
| Episode 7 (November 13) | Dmitriy Monatik | 8 | Karina | "Holla back girl" | Anna, Dara |
| Episode 7 (November 13) | Potap | 9 | Kyrylo | "Loshadi" | Anfisa, Liza |
| Episode | Coach | Order | Winner | Song | Losers |
| Episode 8 (November 20) | Potap | 1 | Helin | "Belaya zima" | Nazar, Denis |
| Episode 8 (November 20) | Tina Karol | 2 | Elina | "Love on Top" | Liza, Anna |
| Episode 8 (November 20) | Dmitriy Monatik | 3 | Vlad | "Zhit v tvoey golove" | Valeria, Margarita |
| Episode 8 (November 20) | Tina Karol | 4 | Oleksandr | "Arkan" | Maria, Emily |
| Episode 8 (November 20) | Potap | 5 | Tatiana | "O tebe" | Anton, Alisa |
| Episode 8 (November 20) | Dmitriy Monatik | 6 | Iulia | "Am I Wrong" | Anna, Darina |
| Episode 8 (November 20) | Tina Karol | 7 | Anastasia | "Dyvna kvitka" | Natalia, Nadia |
| Episode 8 (November 20) | Dmitriy Monatik | 8 | Alina | "Nemovlja" | Aleksandra, Timoti |
| Episode 8 (November 20) | Potap | 9 | Ivan | "Odna Kalina" | Veronika, Elizaveta |

== Knockouts ==
=== Episode 9 (November 27) ===
The Knockouts aired on November 27. Contestants were asked to sing a stripped-down version of a song in order to concentrate on the voice. Then coaches said their results where four members from each team were eliminated.

Color key:

| Artist was saved by his/her coach |
| Artist was eliminated |

| Coach | Order | Artist | Song | Result |
|---|---|---|---|---|
| Potap | 1 | Ivan yastrebov | "Argo" | Eliminated |
| Potap | 2 | Tatiana Alekseenko | "Show Must Go On" | Potap's choice |
| Potap | 3 | Kyrylo Cherpita | "Chandelier" | Eliminated |
| Potap | 4 | Taly Kuper | "Hava Nagila" | Eliminated |
| Potap | 5 | Helin Koniar | "Maybe I, Maybe You" | Eliminated |
| Potap | 6 | Ivanna Reshko | "Hello" | Potap's choice |
| Dmitriy Monatik | 1 | Erik Mkrtchan | "Rise Like a Phoenix" | Eliminated |
| Dmitriy Monatik | 2 | Alina Sansizbay | "Mamenkin Synok" | Eliminated |
| Dmitriy Monatik | 3 | Andriy Boyko | "Georgia On My Mind" | Dmitriy's choice |
| Dmitriy Monatik | 4 | Iulia Radchuk | "Masterpiece" | Eliminated |
| Dmitriy Monatik | 5 | Vlad Fenichko | "Obiymy" | Dmitriy's choice |
| Dmitriy Monatik | 6 | Karina Arakelian | "Can't Buy Me Love" | Eliminated |
| Tina Karol | 1 | Anastasia Tarnavska | "All By Myself" | Eliminated |
| Tina Karol | 2 | Olia Garbuziuk | "Bulochka z Makom" | Eliminated |
| Tina Karol | 3 | Katrina-Paula Diringa | "Kuda Uhodit Detstvo" | Eliminated |
| Tina Karol | 4 | Mikhail Kiselev | "Can't Pretend" | Eliminated |
| Tina Karol | 5 | Elina Ivashchenko | "1944" | Tina's choice |
| Tina Karol | 6 | Oleksandr Podolian | "Nich Yaka Misiachna" | Tina's choice |

== Final ==
=== Episode 10 (December 4) ===
==== Round 1 ====
In this phase of the competition, each of the top six finalists took the stage and performed a solo song. The television audience choose the final three artists who advanced to the next round.

| Coach | Order | Artist | Song | Result |
|---|---|---|---|---|
| Monatik | 1 | Andriy Boyko | "Misto" | Eliminated |
| Monatik | 2 | Vlad Fenichko | "Ocean drive" | Public's сhoice |
| Potap | 3 | Tatiana Alekseenko | "Anhel" | Public's сhoice |
| Potap | 4 | Ivanna Reshko | "A ia plyvu" | Eliminated |
| Tina Karol | 5 | Elina Ivashchenko | "I have nothing" | Public's сhoice |
| Tina Karol | 6 | Oleksandr Podolian | "Nessun dorma" | Eliminated |

Non-competition performances
| Order | Performer | Song |
|---|---|---|
| 1 | Tina Karol, Potap, Monatik and their teams (Coaches of Holos. Dity) (Elina Ivashchenko, Oleksandr Podolian, Ivanna Reshko, Tatiana Olekseenko, Vlad Fenichko, Andriy Boyko) | "Ditynstvo ne vtratchaiy" |
| 2 | Monatik and his team (Andriy Boyko and Vlad Fenichko) | "Kruzhit" |
| 3 | Potap and his team (Ivanna Reshko and Ivan Yastrebov) | "Bumdigibay" |
| 4 | Tina Karol and her team (Elina Ivashchenko and Oleksandr Podolian) | "Tse ty, Ukraino" |

==== Round 2 ====
The final round of the competition featured the top three finalists performed a solo song. Before the start of the performances, voting lines were opened live-in-show for the television audience to vote for the final three and decide the winner. The winner of The Voice Kids was announced at the end of the show.

| Order | Coach | Artist | Song | Result |
|---|---|---|---|---|
| 1 | Potap | Ivanna Reshko | "Halo" | Third Place |
| 2 | Tina Karol | Elina Ivashchenko | "Pid oblachkom" | Winner |
| 3 | Dmitriy Monatik | Vlad Fenichko | "Stari fotografii" | Runner-up |
