= The Voice Kids (Ukrainian TV series) season 1 =

The Voice Kids
- Season 1
- Presented by: Andrii Domanskyi; Kateryna Osadcha
- Coaches: Tina Karol; Oleg Skrypka; Svetlana Loboda
- Winner: Anna Tkach
- Winning mentor: Oleg Skrypka
- Runners-up: Solomia Lukianets and Elina Sosnovskaya

Release
- Original network: 1+1
- Original release: 4 November 2012 – 6 January 2013

Season chronology
- Next → Season 2

The Voice Kids is a Ukrainian television music competition to find new singing talent. The first series began airing on 4 November 2012, being broadcast on a weekly basis on 1+1. It is hosted by Andrii Domanskyi and Kateryna Osadcha, and the coaches are Tina Karol, Oleg Skrypka, and Svetlana Loboda.

== Coaches and finalists ==
– Winning coach/contestant. Winners are in bold, eliminated contestants in small font.
– Runner-up coach/contestant. Final contestant first listed.
- Third Place coach/contestant. Final contestant first listed.

Judges/coaches
| Tina Karol | Oleg Skrypka | Svetlana Loboda |
|---|---|---|
| – Solomia Lukianets – The Mandrikov brothers – Nikita Kiosse | – **Anna Tkach** – Eva Panarina – Maria Kodratenko | – Elina Sosnovskaya – Viktoria Litvinchuk – Yuri Privyka |

== Blind auditions ==
During the Blind auditions, each coach must now form a team of 15 young artists.

It airs from November 4.

Color key

| ✔ | Coach hit his/her "I WANT YOU" button |
| | Artist defaulted to this coach's team |
| | Artist elected to join this coach's team |
| | Artist eliminated with no coach pressing his or her "I WANT YOU" button |

=== Episode 1 (November 4) ===
| Order | Artist | Age | Hometown | Song | Coach's and contestant's choices | | |
| Order | Artist | Age | Hometown | Song | Tina | Oleg | Svetlana |
|---|---|---|---|---|---|---|---|
| 1 | Sofia Terletskaya | 10 | Burshtyn | "Ya lyublyu tilky tebe" | – | – | – |
| 2 | Victoria Litvinchuk | 13 | Horodok | "Sorry Seems to Be the Hardest Word" | ✔ | – | ✔ |
| 3 | Arsen Shavlyuk | 7 | Kyiv | "Ya milogo uznayu po pokhodke" | ✔ | ✔ | ✔ |
| 4 | Yulia Prokhorenko | 9 | Balaklava | "Zholtye botinki" | – | – | – |
| 5 | Kristina Dutchak | 14 | Kalush | "It's My Life" | ✔ | – | ✔ |
| 6 | Nikolay Zaderei | 14 | Kyiv | "Golos vysokoy travy" | – | ✔ | – |
| 7 | Irina Sotnik | 7 | Kyiv | "Oh, ziydemosya rodom" | ✔ | – | – |
| 8 | Roman Sasanchin | 10 | Sadky | "Mama" | – | – | – |
| 9 | Anna Nikonova | 9 | Kyiv | "Zimniy son" | – | – | – |
| 10 | Ivan Kirilko | 13 | Kyiv | "Back in the USSR" | – | – | ✔ |
| 11 | Solomia Lukianets | 11 | Kyiv | "Taki Rari" | ✔ | ✔ | ✔ |

=== Episode 2 (November 11) ===
| Order | Artist | Age | Hometown | Song | Coach's and contestant's choices | | |
| Order | Artist | Age | Hometown | Song | Tina | Oleg | Svetlana |
|---|---|---|---|---|---|---|---|
| 1 | Maksim Opanashchuk | 12 | Rivne | "Smezhaniy kabanchik" | – | ✔ | – |
| 2 | Anastasia Bahinska | 7 | Bila Tserkva | "Tri poradi" | – | – | – |
| 3 | Olga Dulumbadzhi | 14 | Donetsk | "Crazy" | ✔ | ✔ | ✔ |
| 4 | Sergey Cherepakhin | 11 | Luhansk | "V tot vecher ya ne pil, ne pel" | ✔ | ✔ | – |
| 5 | Elizaveta Roziznana | 14 | Shyroka Hreblia | "Hurt" | – | – | – |
| 6 | Maria Krutsenko | 6 | Kyiv | "Ya vernus" | – | ✔ | – |
| 7 | Gidayat Seidov | 13 | Kharkiv | "Svecha gorela na stole" | – | – | – |
| 8 | Katerina Kachanovskaya | 12 | Rivne | "Ya lyublyu bugi-vugi" | – | ✔ | – |
| 9 | Daria Akulova | 14 | Dnipropetrovsk | "Lyubov nastala" | – | – | – |
| 10 | Yuri Samarskiy | 12 | Chernihiv | "Staryy otel" | ✔ | – | – |
| 11 | Ruslana Kalashnikova | 11 | Odesa | "I Believe I Can Fly" | ✔ | – | ✔ |

=== Episode 3 (November 18) ===
| Order | Artist | Age | Hometown | Song | Coach's and contestant's choices | | |
| Order | Artist | Age | Hometown | Song | Tina | Oleg | Svetlana |
|---|---|---|---|---|---|---|---|
| 1 | Valentin Fomenko | 11 | Kherson | "Luna tu" | ✔ | – | ✔ |
| 2 | Diana Korovnikova | 9 | Simferopol | "Mama, ni o chom ty ne zhaley" | – | – | ✔ |
| 3 | Levon Pogosov | 11 | Alchevsk | "Eh, vy, koni" | – | – | – |
| 4 | Kristina Kochegarova | 12 | Kyiv | "Because of You" | ✔ | – | ✔ |
| 5 | Andriy Boyko | 9 | Vyshneve | "Blue Suede Shoes" | – | ✔ | – |
| 6 | Elvira Apsheva | 9 | Kyiv | "Nevidimaya" | – | – | – |
| 7 | Alina Ovcharenko | 12 | Kyiv | "At Last" | ✔ | ✔ | ✔ |
| 8 | Aleksey Tkachenko | 10 | Poltava | "Mattinata" | – | – | – |
| 9 | Daria Sokolovskaya | 13 | Zhytomyr | "I Surrender" | ✔ | – | – |
| 10 | Ivan Lesnoy | 12 | Dniprodzerzhynsk | "Sneg" | – | – | – |
| 11 | Anastasiya Demyanovich | 7 | Krasnyi Luch | "Delu vremya" | ✔ | – | ✔ |
| 12 | Yuri Privyka | 12 | Ivano-Frankivsk | "Zorepadom letyat roki..." | ✔ | – | ✔ |

=== Episode 4 (November 25) ===
| Order | Artist | Age | Hometown | Song | Coach's and contestant's choices | | |
| Order | Artist | Age | Hometown | Song | Tina | Oleg | Svetlana |
|---|---|---|---|---|---|---|---|
| 1 | Olga Mishagina | 9 | Vilnohirsk | "Mon mec á moi" | ✔ | – | – |
| 2 | Valeria Kovalenko | 14 | Hrebinka | "Kvitka-dusha " | ✔ | ✔ | – |
| 3 | Victor Papp | 12 | Uzhhorod | "Caruso " | – | – | – |
| 4 | Eva Panarina | 11 | Khmelnytskyi | "Something’s Got a Hold on Me" | – | ✔ | – |
| 5 | Nazariy Stinyanskiy | 10 | Vinnytsia | "Lesnoy olen" | – | ✔ | – |
| 6 | Elizabeth Doroshenko | 6 | Sumy | "Namolyuyu tobi zori" | – | – | – |
| 7 | Maria Kondratenko | 12 | Kharkiv | "Non, je ne regretted rien" | ✔ | ✔ | – |
| 8 | Artem Kuznetsov | 9 | Orenburg, Russia | " Ot vesny i do vesny " | – | – | – |
| 9 | Elizabeth Soboleva | 14 | Chernihiv | "New York, New York" | ✔ | – | ✔ |
| 10 | Katerina Kovalchuk | 11 | Kyiv | "Oranzhevoye leto " | – | – | – |
| 11 | Anna Tkach | 7 | Kotovsk | "Ostanus " | – | ✔ | – |
| 12 | Nikita Kiosse | 13 | Ryazan, Russia | "All by Muself" | ✔ | ✔ | ✔ |

=== Episode 5 (December 2) ===
| Order | Artist | Age | Hometown | Song | Coach's and contestant's choices | | |
| Order | Artist | Age | Hometown | Song | Tina | Oleg | Svetlana |
|---|---|---|---|---|---|---|---|
| 1 | Nikita Konovalov | 12 | Luhansk | "Tutti Frutti" | – | ✔ | – |
| 2 | Diana Pihun | 10 | Hnivan | "Kadril" | ✔ | ✔ | – |
| 3 | Mila Savitskaya | 13 | Kyiv | "We Will Rock You" | – | – | – |
| 4 | Sofia Provotorova and Daria Fedorenko | 12/12 | Kharkiv | "Firework" | – | ✔ | – |
| 5 | Mikhail Pisanko | 12 | Poltava | "Divlyus ya na nebo" | – | – | – |
| 6 | Anastasiya Lisukha | 10 | Netishyn | " Zozulya" | – | – | – |
| 7 | Elina Sosnovskaya | 12 | Oktiabrske | "I Have Nothing" | – | – | ✔ |
| 8 | Ruslan Asanov | 11 | Kolodeznoye | "What Can I Do " | – | – | – |
| 9 | Kristina Karabanova | 11 | Kyiv | "Leningradskiy rok-n-roll" | ✔ | ✔ | – |
| 10 | Shefika Tatarisova | 14 | Oktiabrske | Tatar folk song | – | – | – |
| 11 | Sofia Sakharova | 12 | Kyiv | "The Party is Over " | – | ✔ | – |
| 12 | Ivan and Andrey Mandrikovy | 11/11 | Cherkasy | "Serdtsem k serdtsu" | ✔ | ✔ | ✔ |

=== Episode 6 (December 9) ===
| Order | Artist | Age | Hometown | Song | Coach's and contestant's choices | | |
| Order | Artist | Age | Hometown | Song | Tina | Oleg | Svetlana |
|---|---|---|---|---|---|---|---|
| 1 | Ulengya Dubrova | 8 | Feodosiya | "Valenki" | – | – | – |
| 2 | Victoria Kalashnikova | 10 | Yevpatoria | "I Got You (I Feel Good)" | – | ✔ | – |
| 3 | Nikita Lyakh | 11 | Odesa | "Vesely, veter!" | – | – | – |
| 4 | Pollianna Ryzhak | 9 | Dunaivtsi | "Hurt" | – | – | – |
| 5 | Anastasia Kuziv | 9 | Burshtyn | "Bula sobі Marіechka" | ✔ | ✔ | – |
| 6 | Maria Cherkasova | 9 | Dnipropetrovsk | "Mama, papa i jazz" | ✔ | Team full | – |
| 7 | Sofia Tarasova | 11 | Kyiv | "Baby" | ✔ | Team full | – |
| 8 | Polina Yugay | 11 | Simferopol | "Lyubov nastala" | ✔ | Team full | – |
| 9 | Bogdan Denis | 13 | Zarechye | "I Surrender" | Team full | Team full | ✔ |
| 10 | Lyudmila-Aissata Bolli | 10 | Berdiansk | "Zholtye botinki" | Team full | Team full | – |
| 11 | Valeria Khomenko | 11 | Bila Tserkva | "Because of You" | Team full | Team full | ✔ |
| 12 | Arseny Bykov | 11 | Berdiansk | "Tro-lo-lo" | Team full | Team full | ✔ |

== The Battles ==
In the second stage, called the battle phase, coaches have three of their team members battle against each other directly by singing the same song together, with the coach choosing which team member to advance from each of individual "battles" into the Semifinal stage.

| Tina Karol | Oleg Skrypka | Svetlana Loboda |
|---|---|---|
| Pavlo Tabakov | Ilaria | Arsen Mirzoian |

Color key

| Artist won the Battle and advances to the Semifinal |
| Artist lost the Battle and was eliminated |

| Episode | Coach | Order | Winner | Song | Losers |
|---|---|---|---|---|---|
| Episode 7 (December 16) | Svetlana Loboda | 1 | Victoria | "The Winner Takes It All" | Kristina, Valeria |
| Episode 7 (December 16) | Tina Karol | 2 | Olga | "Vdol po Piterskoy" | Irina, Diana |
| Episode 7 (December 16) | Oleg Skrypka | 3 | Nikolay | "Jamaica" | Nazariy, Sergey |
| Episode 7 (December 16) | Tina Karol | 4 | Solomia | "Chornobrivtsi" | Polina, Valeria |
| Episode 7 (December 16) | Svetlana Loboda | 5 | Elina | "I Will Always Love You" | Elizabeth, Bogdan |
| Episode 7 (December 16) | Oleg Skrypka | 6 | Anna | "Ne plachte rozhi" | Maria, Sofia |
| Episode 7 (December 16) | Tina Karol | 7 | Kristina | "Simply the Best" | Sofia, Daria |
| Episode | Coach | Order | Winner | Song | Losers |
| Episode 8 (December 23) | Oleg Skrypka | 1 | Anastasia | "Pesnya Oksany" | Anastasiya, Katerina |
| Episode 8 (December 23) | Svetlana Loboda | 2 | Arsen | "Govoryat, my byaki-buki" | Diana, Anastasia |
| Episode 8 (December 23) | Svetlana Loboda | 3 | Yuri | "Ridna mati moya" | Arseny, Ivan |
| Episode 8 (December 23) | Tina Karol | 4 | Nikita | "My Heart Will Go On " | Ruslana, Maria |
| Episode 8 (December 23) | Tina Karol | 5 | The Mandrikov brothers | "Fairytale" | Kristina, Yuri |
| Episode 8 (December 23) | Oleg Skrypka | 6 | Eva | "Oh, u vishnevomu sadu" | Sofia and Daria, Victoria |
| Episode 8 (December 23) | Svetlana Loboda | 7 | Olga | "Someone Like You " | Alina, Valentin |
| Episode 8 (December 23) | Oleg Skrypka | 8 | Andriy | "Nemovlja" | Maksim, Nikita |

== Semifinal ==
=== Episode 9 (December 30) ===
| Order | Coach | Artist | Song | Result |
|---|---|---|---|---|
| 1 | Oleg Skrypka | Maria Kodratenko | "Happy New Year" | Oleg's choice |
| 2 | Svetlana Loboda | Arsen Shavlyuk | "Chashka chaya na stole" | Eliminated |
| 3 | Tina Karol | Solomia Lukianets | "5th element" | Public's сhoice |
| 4 | Oleg Skrypka | Andriy Boyko | "Galya, prikhod" | Eliminated |
| 5 | Svetlana Loboda | Viktoria Litvinchuk | "Je suis malade" | Public's сhoice |
| 6 | Tina Karol | Olga Mishagina | "Charodei" | Eliminated |
| 7 | Svetlana Loboda | Yuri Privyka | "Kholodno" | Svetlana's choice |
| 8 | Tina Karol | Kristina Dutchak | "The Show Must Go On" | Eliminated |
| 9 | Oleg Skrypka | Anna Tkach | "Charivna skripka" | Public's сhoice |
| 10 | Oleg Skrypka | Nikolay Zaderei | "Cucarella" | Eliminated |
| 11 | Svetlana Loboda | Elina Sosnovskaya | "Tam net menya" | Public's сhoice |
| 12 | Tina Karol | Nikita Kiosse | "Earth Song" | Tina's choice |
| 13 | Oleg Skrypka | Eva Panarina | "Puttin' On the Ritz" | Public's сhoice |
| 14 | Svetlana Loboda | Olga Dulumbadzhi | "Obernis" | Eliminated |
| 15 | Tina Karol | The Mandrikov brothers | "Novogodnyaya" | Public's choice |

Non-competition performances
| Order | Performer | Song |
|---|---|---|
| 1 | Ekaterina Gracheva, Galina Bezruk and Natalia Pichkur (Participants of The Voice of Ukraine) | "5 minutes" |
| 2 | Oleg Skrypka and his team (Maksim Opanashchuk, Nikita Konovalov, Andriy Boyko) | "Postoy, parovoz" |

== Final ==
=== Episode 10 (January 6) ===
==== Round 1 ====
In this phase of the competition, each of the top nine finalists took the stage and performed a solo song. The television audience choose the final three artists who advanced to the next round.

| Order | Coach | Artist | Song | Result |
|---|---|---|---|---|
| 1 | Oleg Skrypka | Eva Panarina | "Lullaby of Birdland" | Eliminated |
| 2 | Tina Karol | The Mandrikov brothers | "Vakhteram" | Eliminated |
| 3 | Svetlana Loboda | Elina Sosnovskaya | "Je t’aime" | Public's сhoice |
| 4 | Oleg Skrypka | Anna Tkach | "Namalyuy menі nіch" | Public's сhoice |
| 5 | Tina Karol | Nikita Kiosse | "Vіdpusti" | Eliminated |
| 6 | Svetlana Loboda | Viktoria Litvinchuk | "Minaе den, minaе nіch" | Eliminated |
| 7 | Oleg Skrypka | Maria Kodratenko | "Ciao, bambino, sorry" | Eliminated |
| 8 | Svetlana Loboda | Yuri Privyka | "Adagio" | Eliminated |
| 9 | Tina Karol | Solomia Lukianets | "Time to Say Goodbye" | Public's сhoice |

==== Round 2 ====
The final round of the competition featured the top three finalists doing duets with their coach. Before the start of the performances, voting lines were opened live-in-show for the television audience to vote for the final three and decide the winner. The winner of The Voice Kids was announced at the end of the show.

| Order | Coach | Artist | Duet (with Coach) | Result |
|---|---|---|---|---|
| 1 | Oleg Skrypka | Anna Tkach | "Mama" | Winner |
| 2 | Svetlana Loboda | Elina Sosnovskaya | "40 gradusov" | Third Place |
| 3 | Tina Karol | Solomia Lukianets | "Vyshe Oblakov" | Runner-up |
