= Holos Dity =

Ukrainian music talent show for children

- Ukrainian: Holos. Dity; Голос. Дiти
- Genre: Talent show
- Created by: John de Mol Jr.
- Presented by: Andriy Domansʹkyy; Kateryna Osadcha; Yuriy Horbunov
- Judges: Oleh Skrypka; Svetlana Loboda; Tina Karol; Potap; Natalia Mohylevska; Monatik; Vremya i Steklo; DZIDZIO; Jamala
- Country of origin: Ukraine
- Original language: Ukrainian
- No. of seasons: 5

Original release
- Network: 1+1
- Release: 4 November 2012 – present

Holos. Dity (Ukrainian: Голос. Дiти; meaning The Voice Kids) is a Ukrainian music talent show for children from 6 to 14 years, based on the concept of the show Голос країни. The first broadcast took place on the 1+1 network on November 4, 2012. The show's fifth season, premiered in May 2019 and concluded two months later.

== Coaches ==
Timeline of coaches
Coach	Seasons				
Coach	1	2	3	4	5
Tina Karol					
Oleh Skrypka					
Svetlana Loboda					
Potap					
Natalia Mohylevska					
Monatik					
Vremya i Steklo					
Jamala					
Mykhailo Khoma					

=== Gallery ===
Coaches gallery

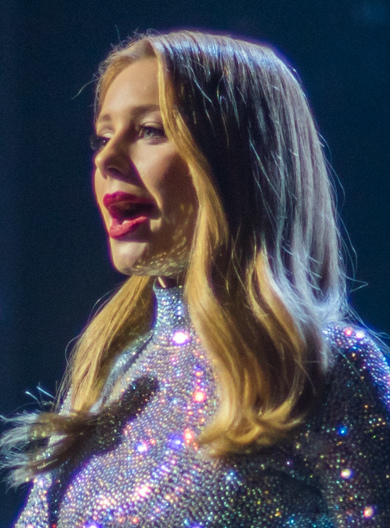
Tina Karol (Seasons 1–3)

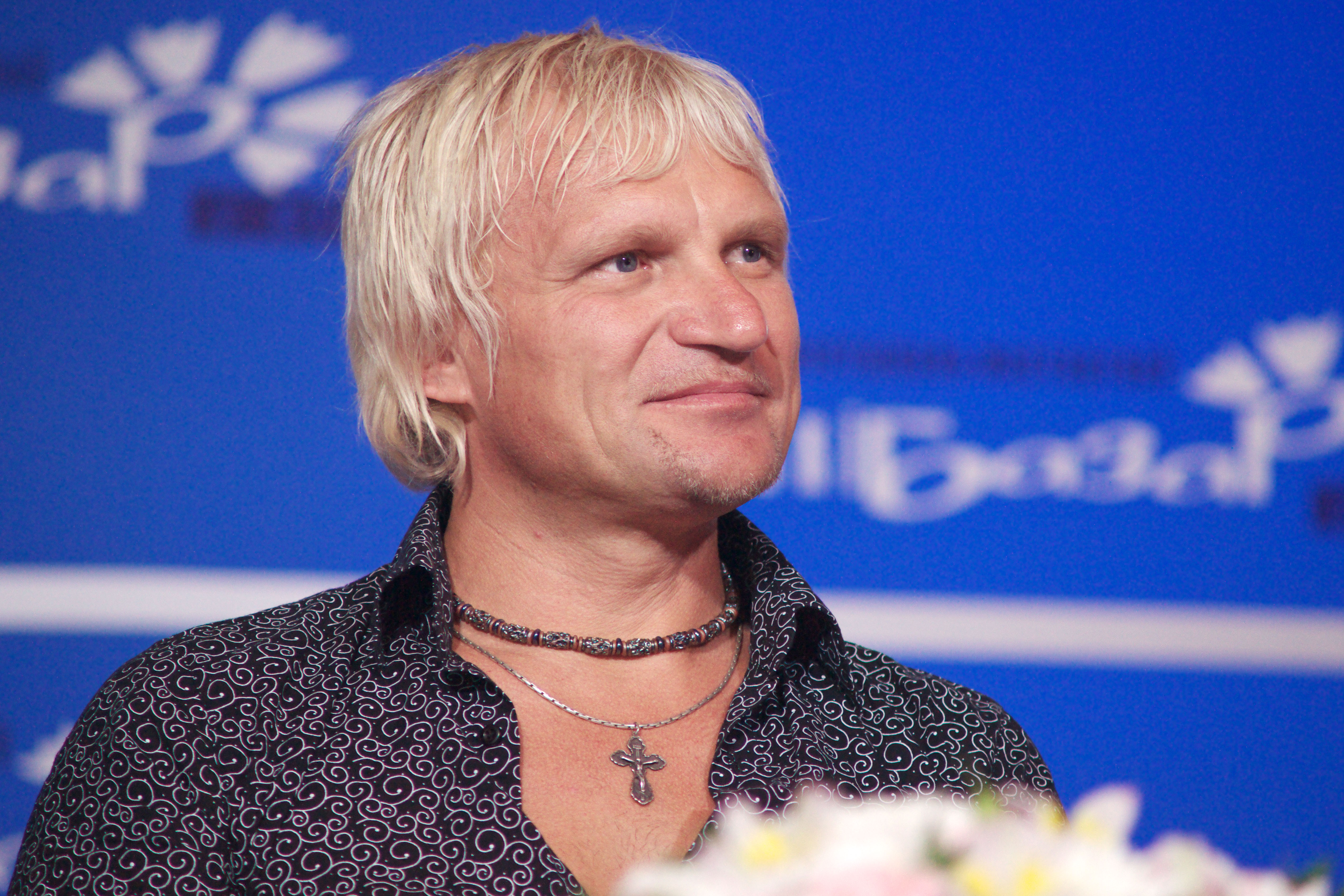
Oleh Skrypka (Season 1)

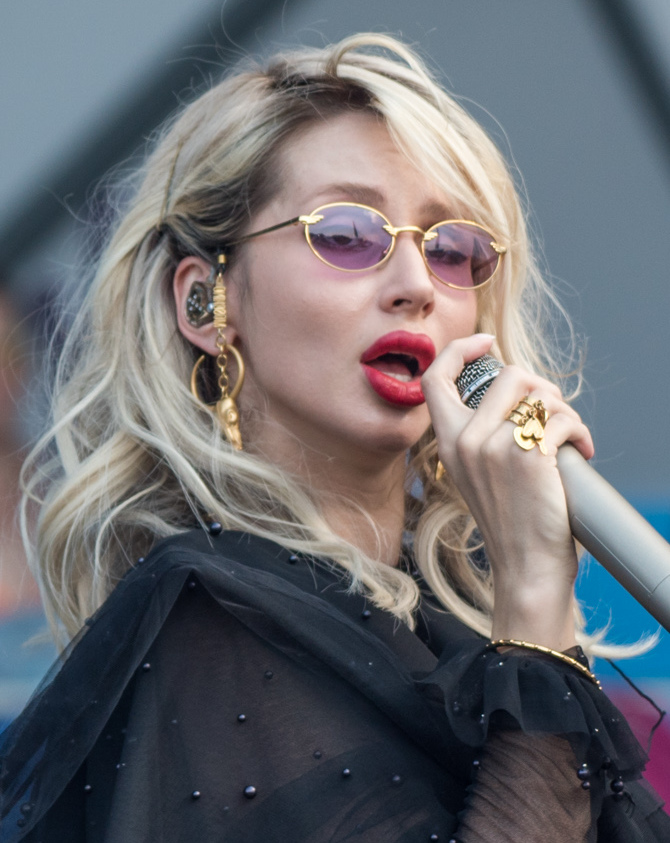
Svetlana Loboda (Season 1)

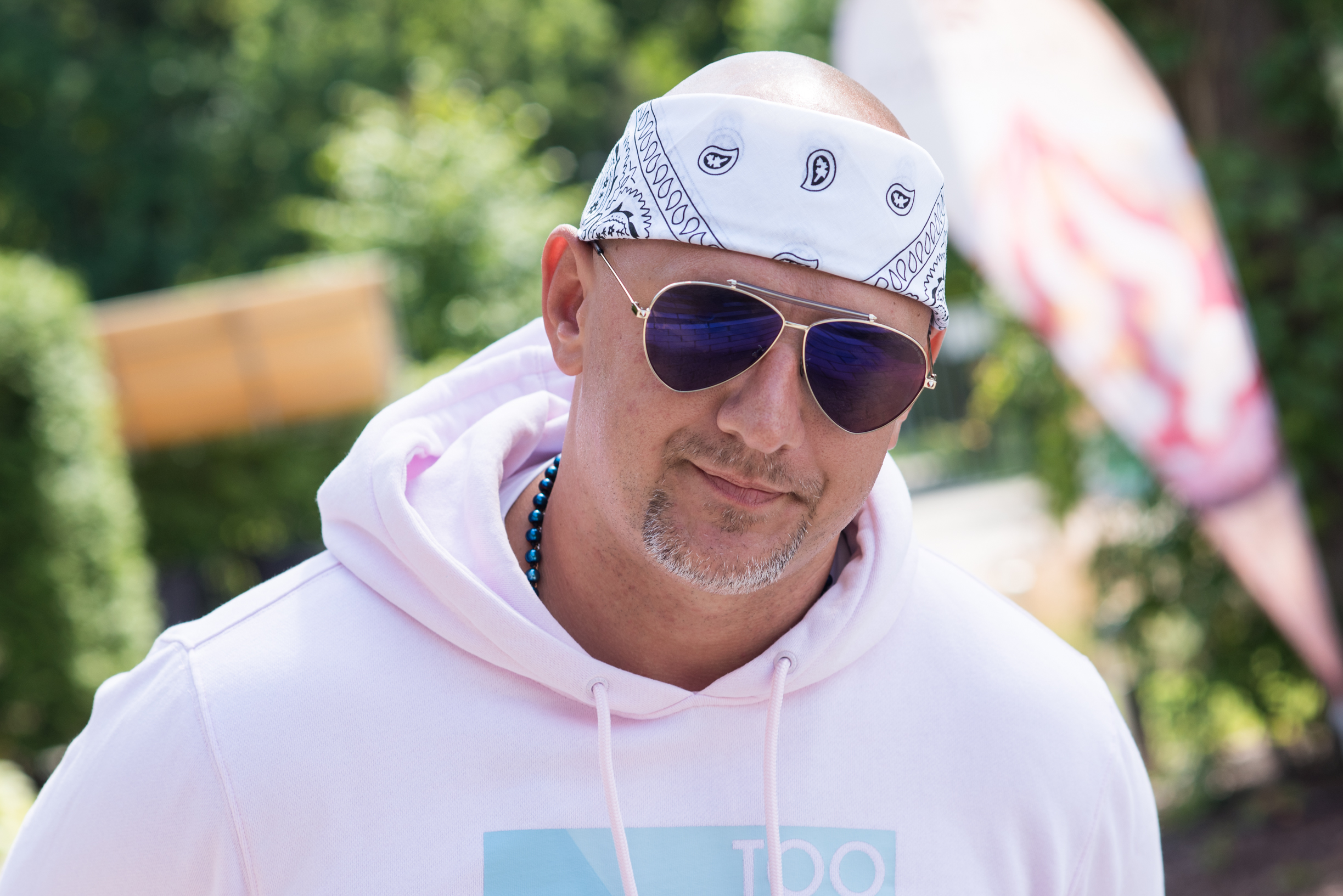
Potap (Seasons 2 and 3)

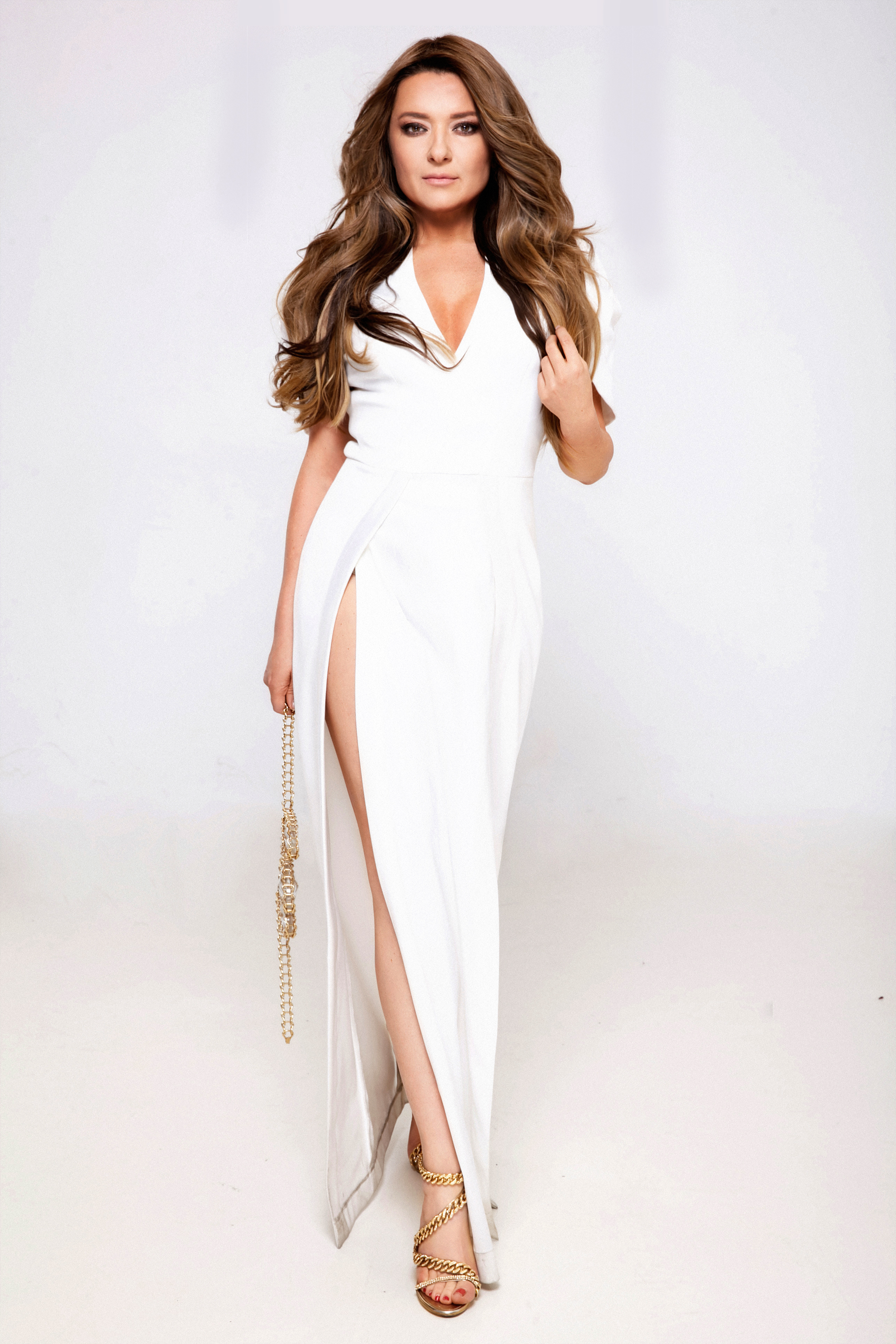
Natalia Mohylevska (Seasons 2 and 4)

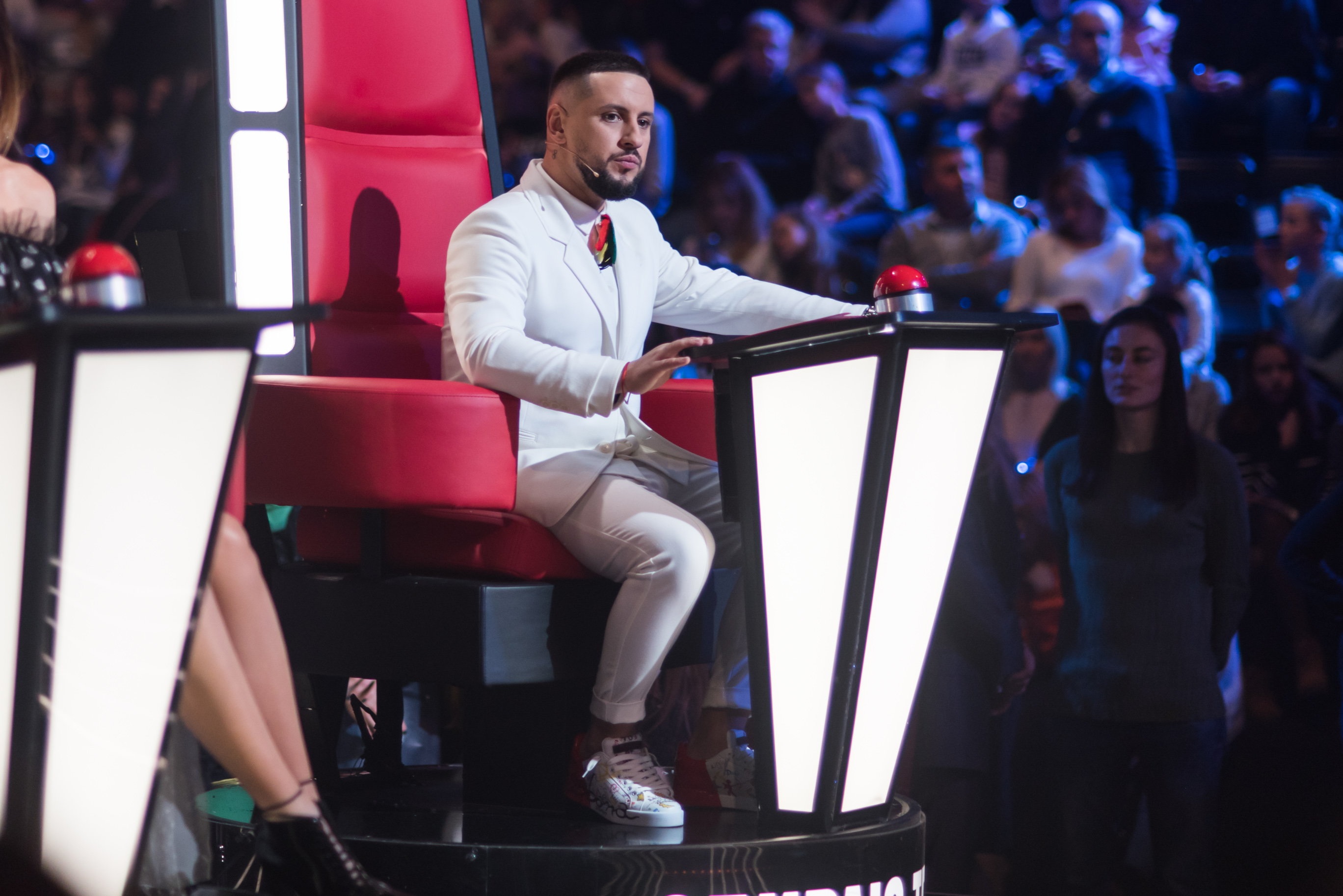
Monatik (Seasons 3 and 4)

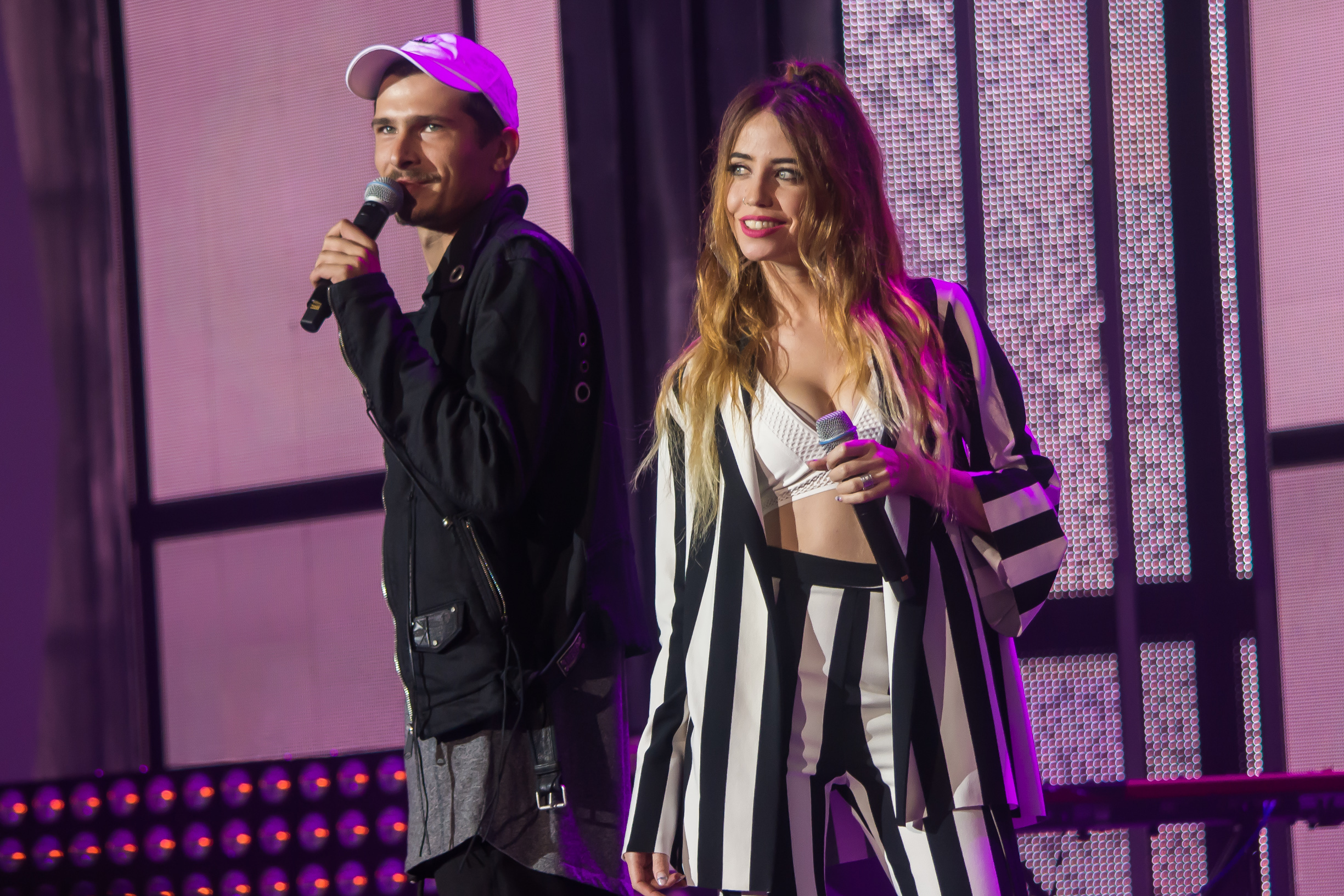
Vremya i Steklo (Seasons 4 and 5)

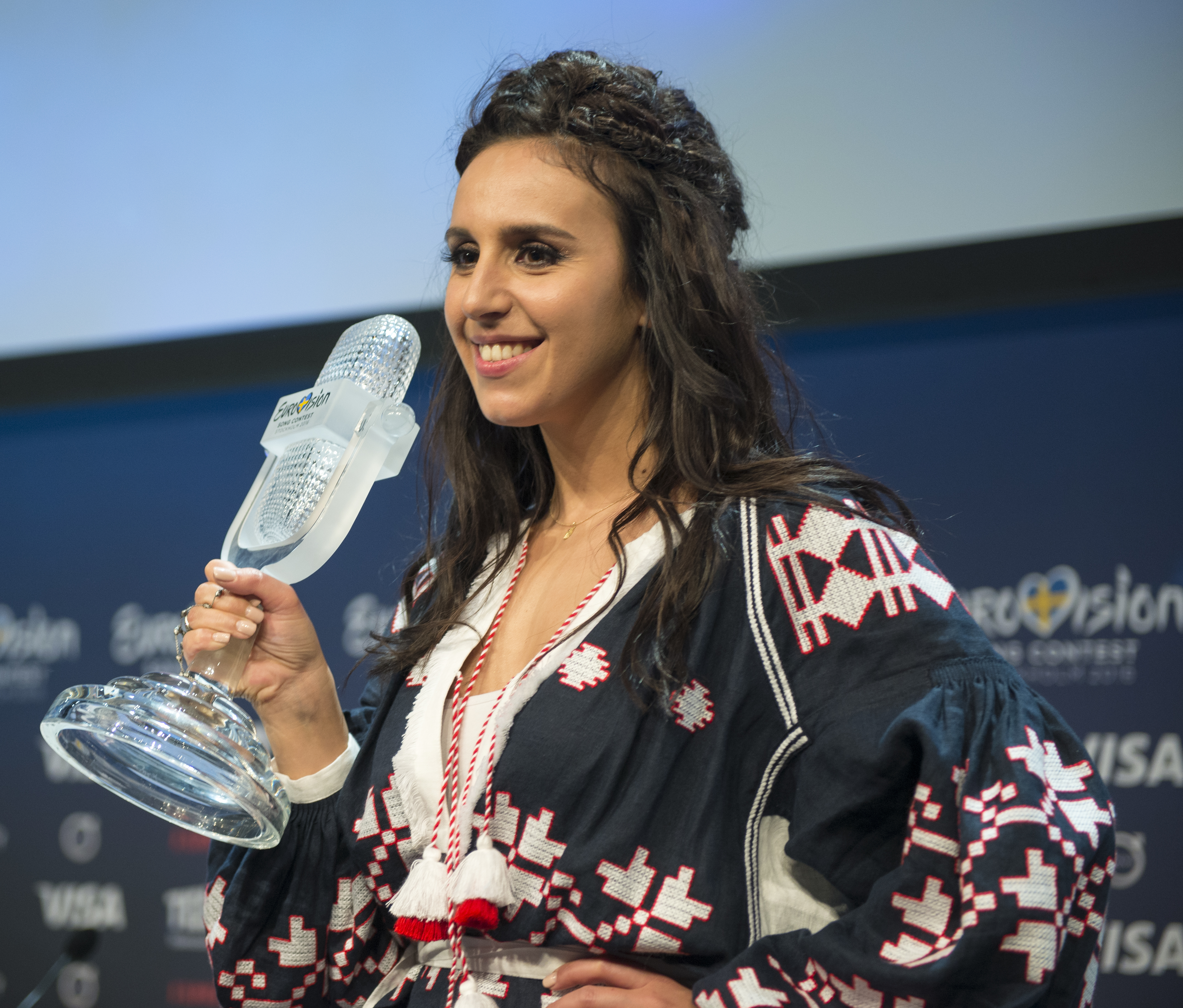
Jamala (Season 5)

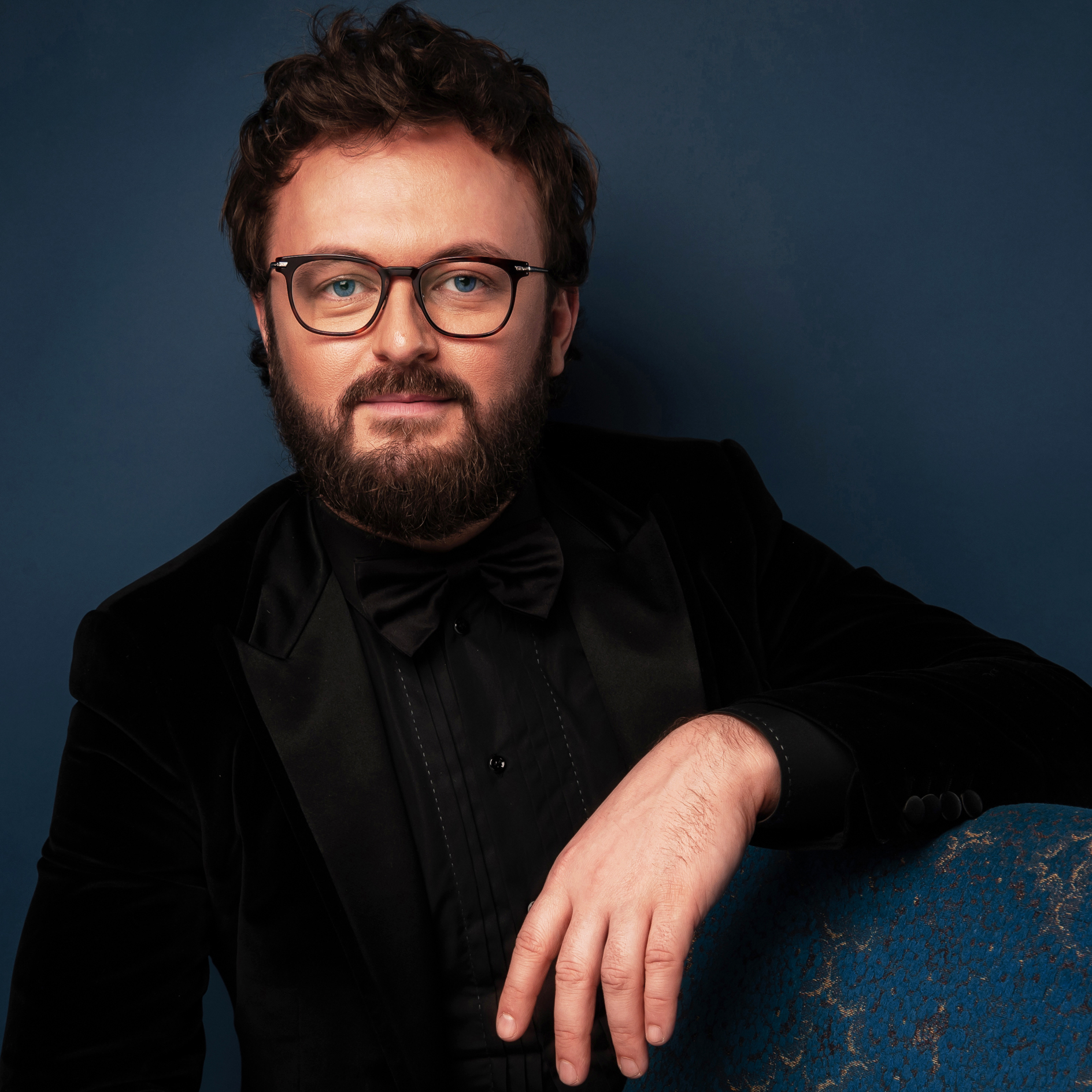
Dzidzio (Season 5)

=== Line-up ===
Coaches' line-up by chairs order
Season	Year(s)	Coaches		
Season	Year(s)	1	2	3
1	2012	Tina	Oleh	Svetlana
2	2015	Tina	Potap	Natalia
3	2016	Potap	Tina	Monatik
4	2017	Natalia	Oleksiy & Dorofeeva	Monatik
5	2019	Jamala	Oleksiy & Dorofeeva	Dzidzio
6	2027	Tina	Dzidzio	Zlata

== Presenters ==
=== Timeline ===
Presenter	Season				
Presenter	1	2	3	4	5
Kateryna Osadcha					
Andriy Domansʹkyy					
Yuriy Horbunov					

=== Gallery ===
Presenters gallery

Andriy Domansʹkyy (2012–2013)

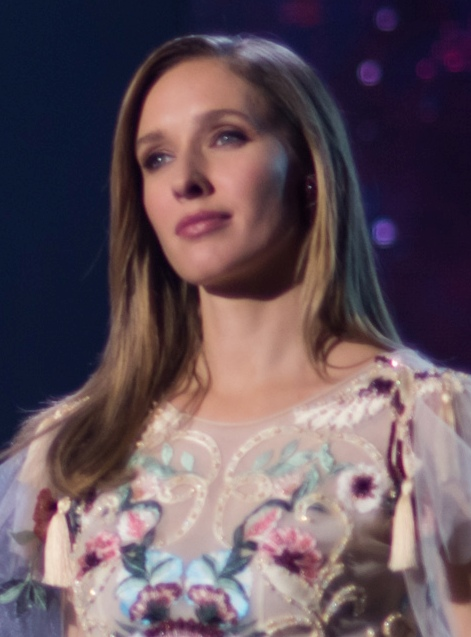
Kateryna Osadcha (2012–2013, 2015–2019 2026)

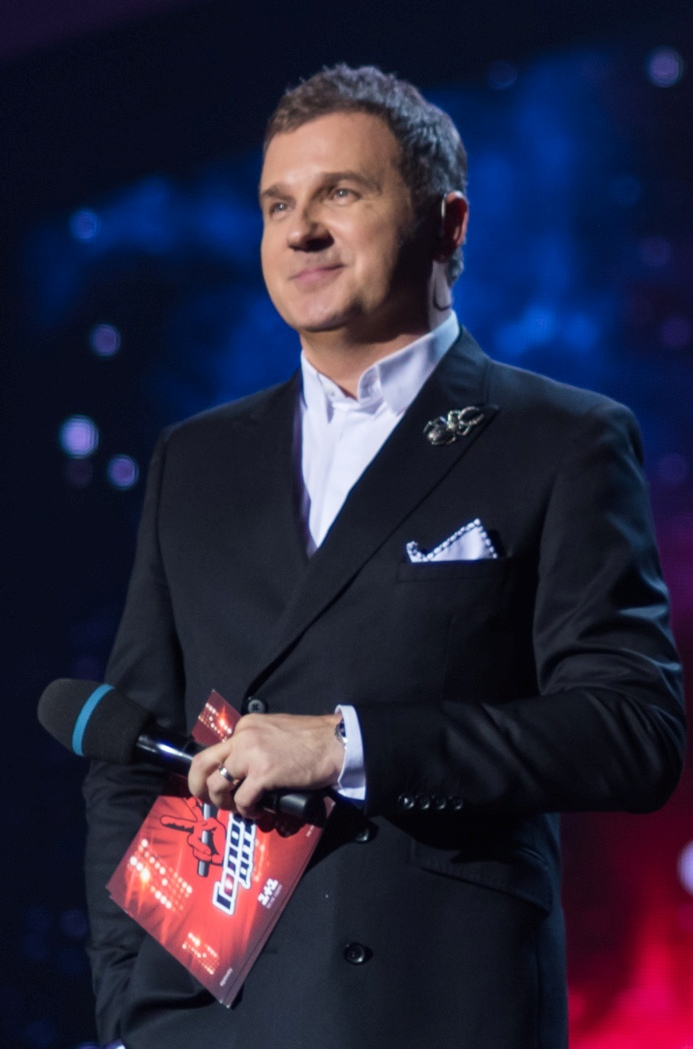
Yuriy Horbunov (2015–2019)

== Coaches and finalists ==
– Winning coach & contestant.
– Runner-up coach & contestant.
– Third place coach & contestant.

- Winners are in bold, remaining finalists in italic, and eliminated contestants in small font.

Season	Coaches and contestants		
1	Tina Karol	Oleh Skrypka	Svetlana Loboda
1	Solomia Lukianets; The Mandrikov Brothers; Nikita Kiosse	**Anna Tkach**; Eva Panarina; Maria Kodratenko	Elina Sosnovska; Viktoria Litvinchuk; Yuri Privyka
2	Tina Karol	Potap	Natalia Mohylevska
2	**Roman Sasanchin**; Ruslan Aslanov	Anastasia Bahinska; Ivan Lesnoy	Michael King; Bogdan Temchenko
3	Potap	Tina Karol	Monatik
3	Ivanna Reshko; Tatiana Alekseenko	**Elina Ivashchenko**; Oleksandr Podolian	Vlad Fenichko; Andriy Boyko
4	Natalia Mogilevskaya	Vremya i Steklo	Monatik
4	Elizaveta Yakovenko; Katerina Manuzina	Alexander Minyonok; Yana Gornaya	**Daneliya Tuleshova**; Nino Basilaya
5	Jamala	Vremya i Steklo	DZIDZIO
5	Varvara Koshova; Nikita Achkasov	**Oleksandr Zazarashvili**; Karina Stolaba	Yaroslav Karpuk; Veronika Morska

== Series overview ==
Warning: the following table presents a significant amount of different colors.

Team Tina Karol
Team Oleh Skrypka
Team LOBODA

Team Potap
Team Natalia Mohylevska
Team Monatik

Team Vremya i Steklo
Team Jamala
Team DZIDZIO

Ukrainian The Voice Kids overview
Season	Year	Winner	Runner-up	Third place	Winning coach	Presenters		Coaches (chair's order)		
Season	Year	Winner	Runner-up	Third place	Winning coach	Presenters		1	2	3
1	2012–13	Anna Tkach	Solomia Lukianets	Elina Sosnovska	Oleh Skrypka	Kateryna Osadcha	Andriy Domanskyy	Tina Karol	Oleh Skrypka	LOBODA
2	2015	Roman Sasanchyn	Anastasia Bahinska	Mykhailo Tsar	Tina Karol	Kateryna Osadcha	Yuriy Horbunov	Tina Karol	Potap	Natalia Mohylevska
3	2016	Elina Ivashchenko	Vlad Fenichko	Ivanna Reshko	Tina Karol	Kateryna Osadcha	Yuriy Horbunov	Potap	Tina Karol	Monatik
4	2017	Daneliya Tuleshova	Alexander Minyonok	Elizaveta Yakovenko	Monatik	Kateryna Osadcha	Yuriy Horbunov	Natalia Mohylevska	Vremya i Steklo	Monatik
5	2019	Oleksandr Zazarashvili	Yaroslav Karpuk	Varvara Koshova	Vremya i Steklo	Kateryna Osadcha	Yuriy Horbunov	Jamala	Vremya i Steklo	DZIDZIO

== Gallery ==
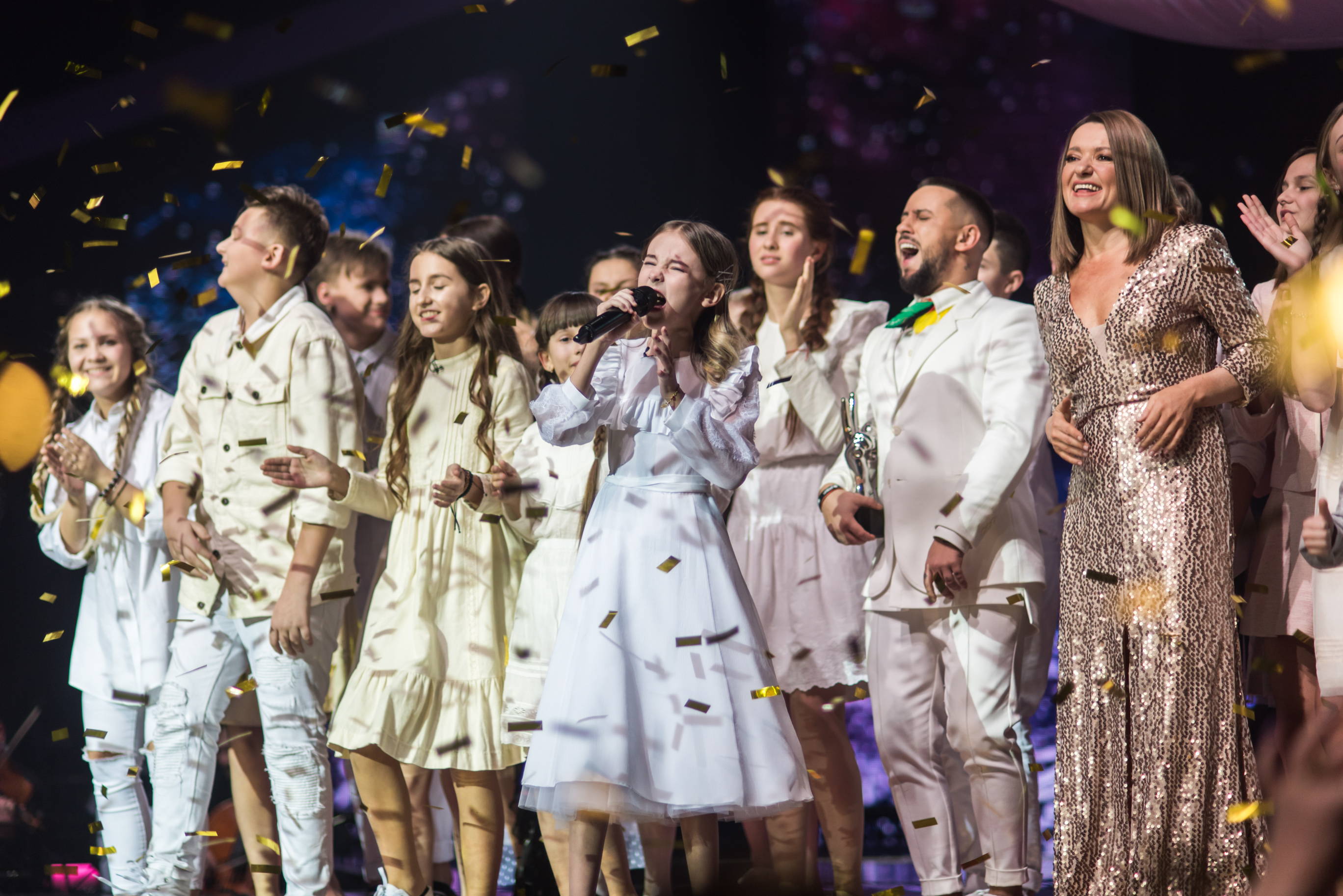

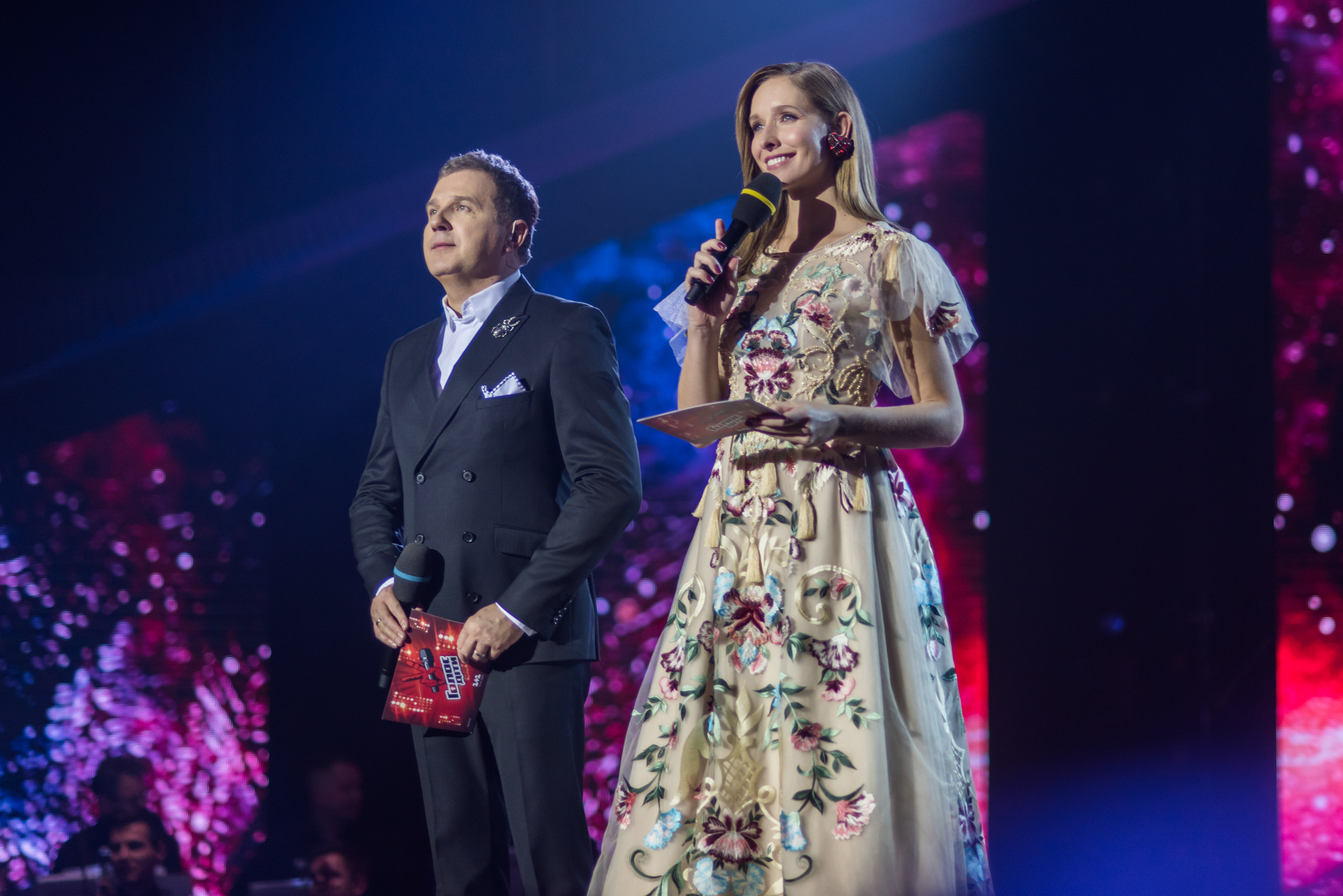

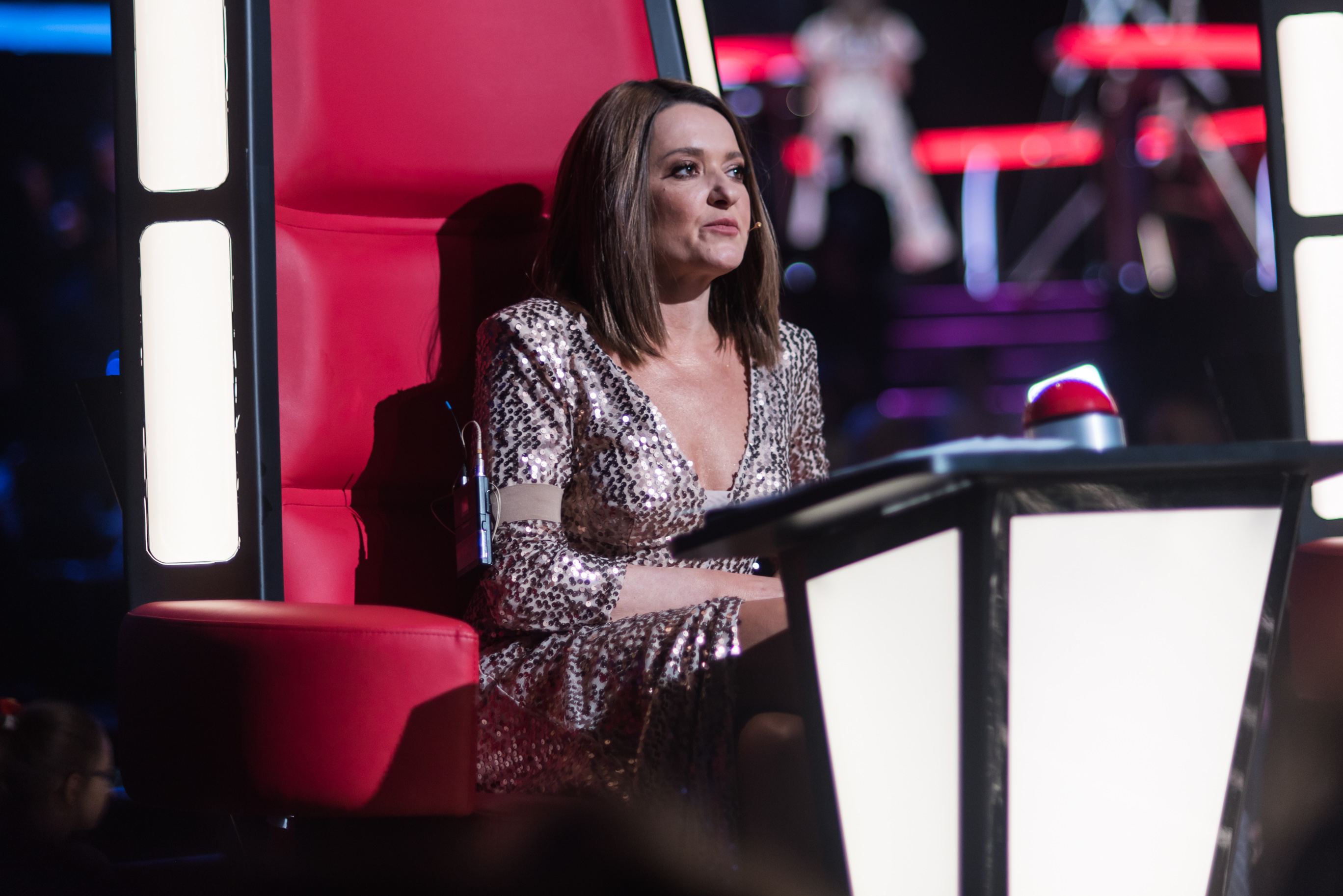

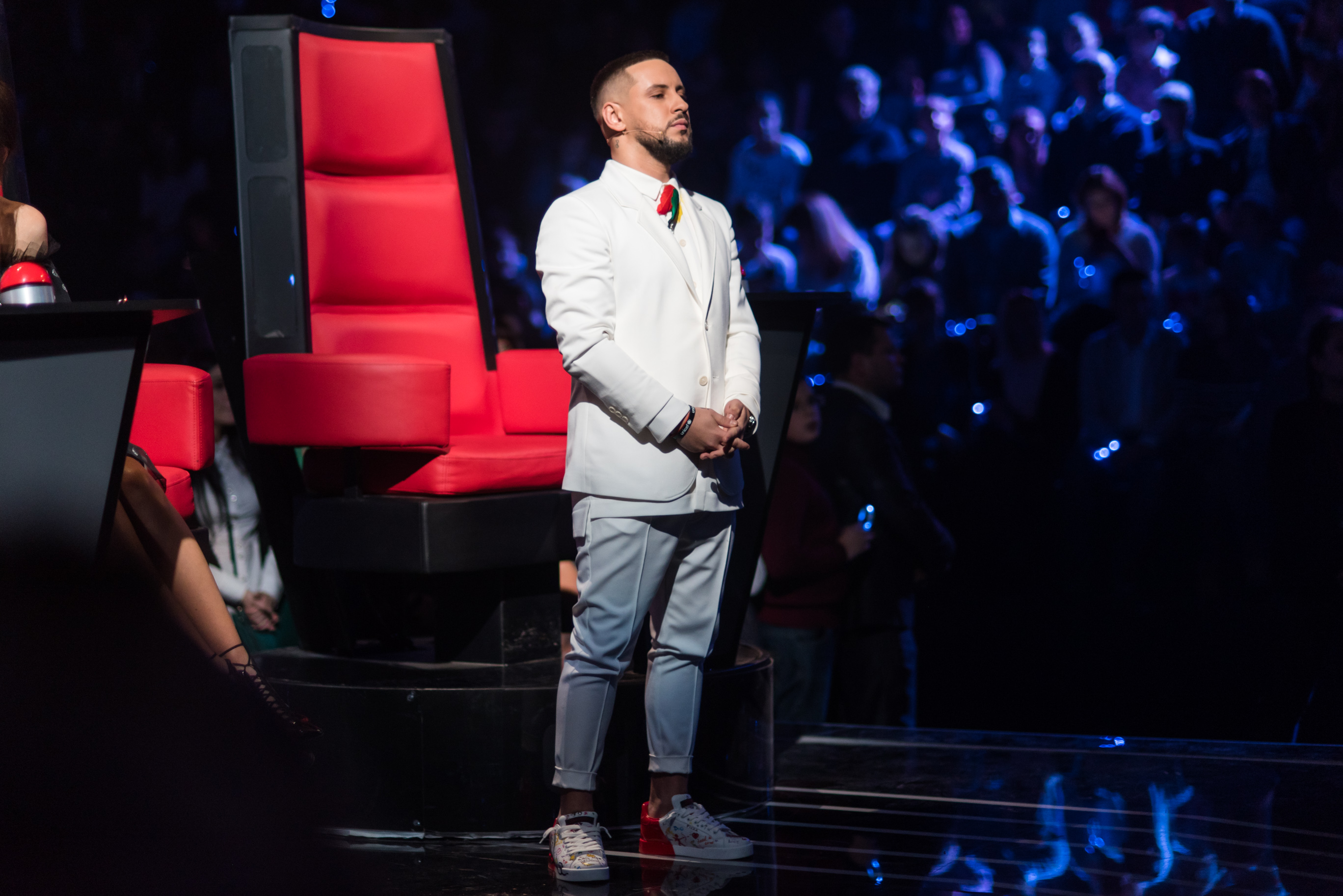

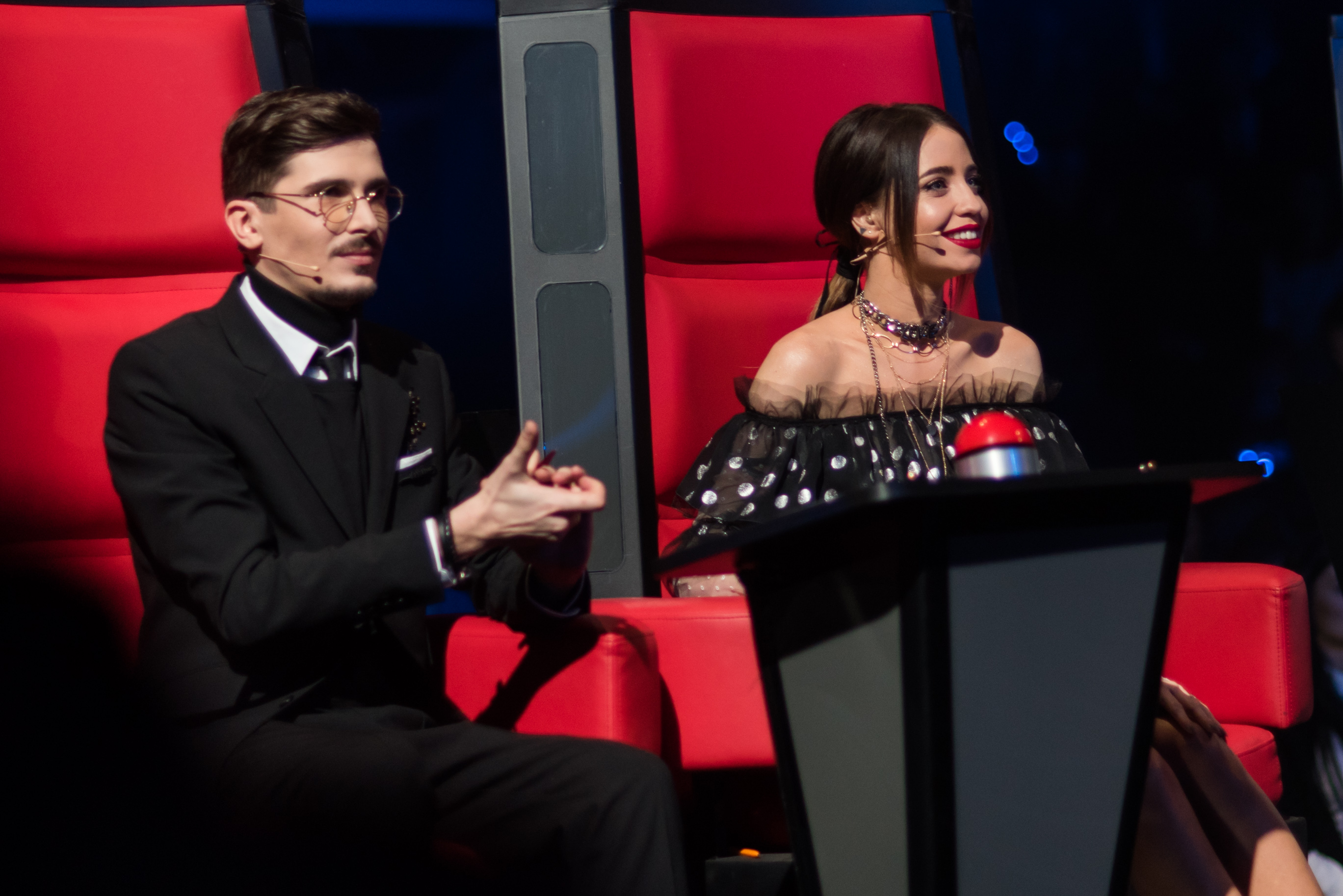

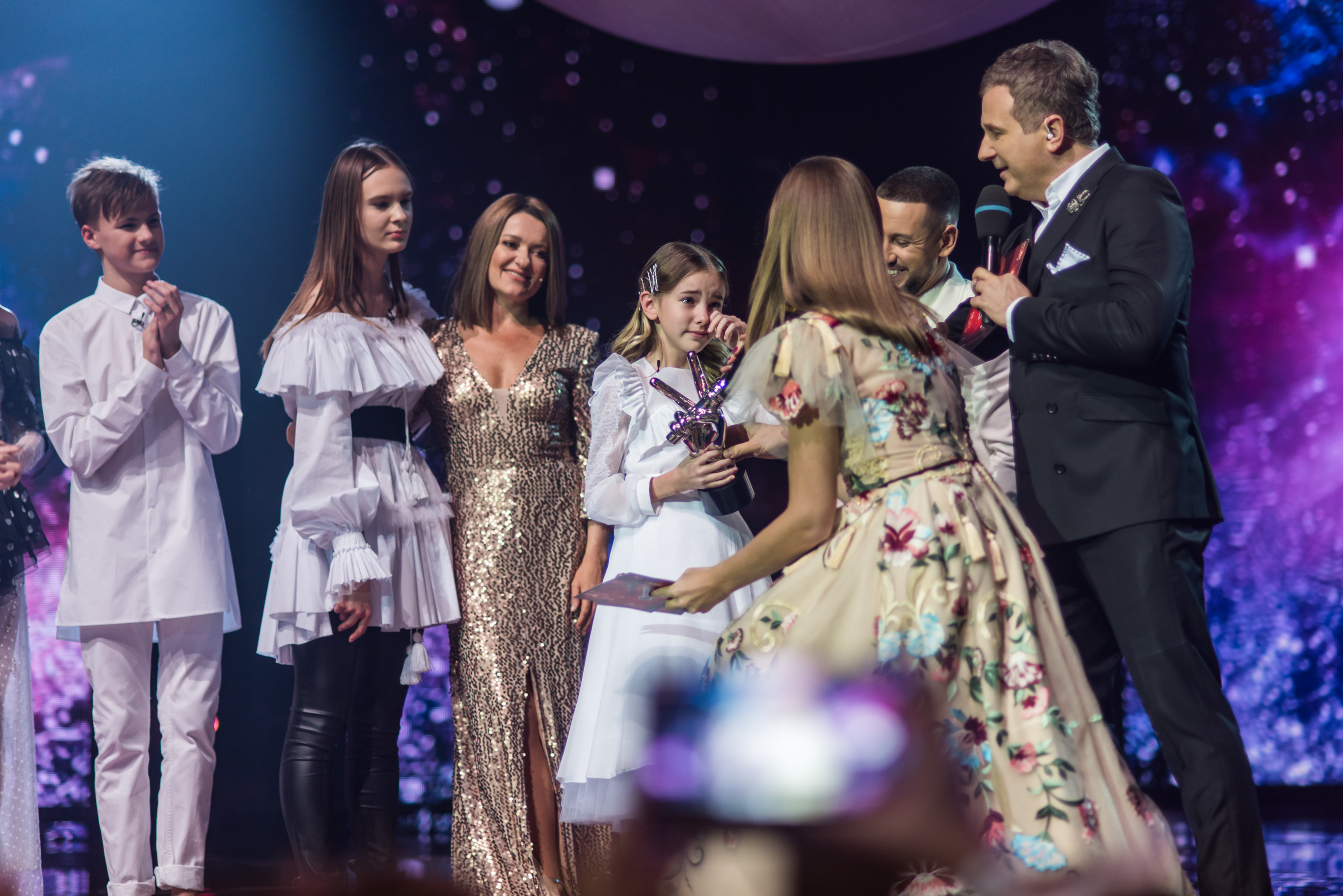
