= Time and Glass =

Ukrainian musical duo

Time & Glass Время и Стекло
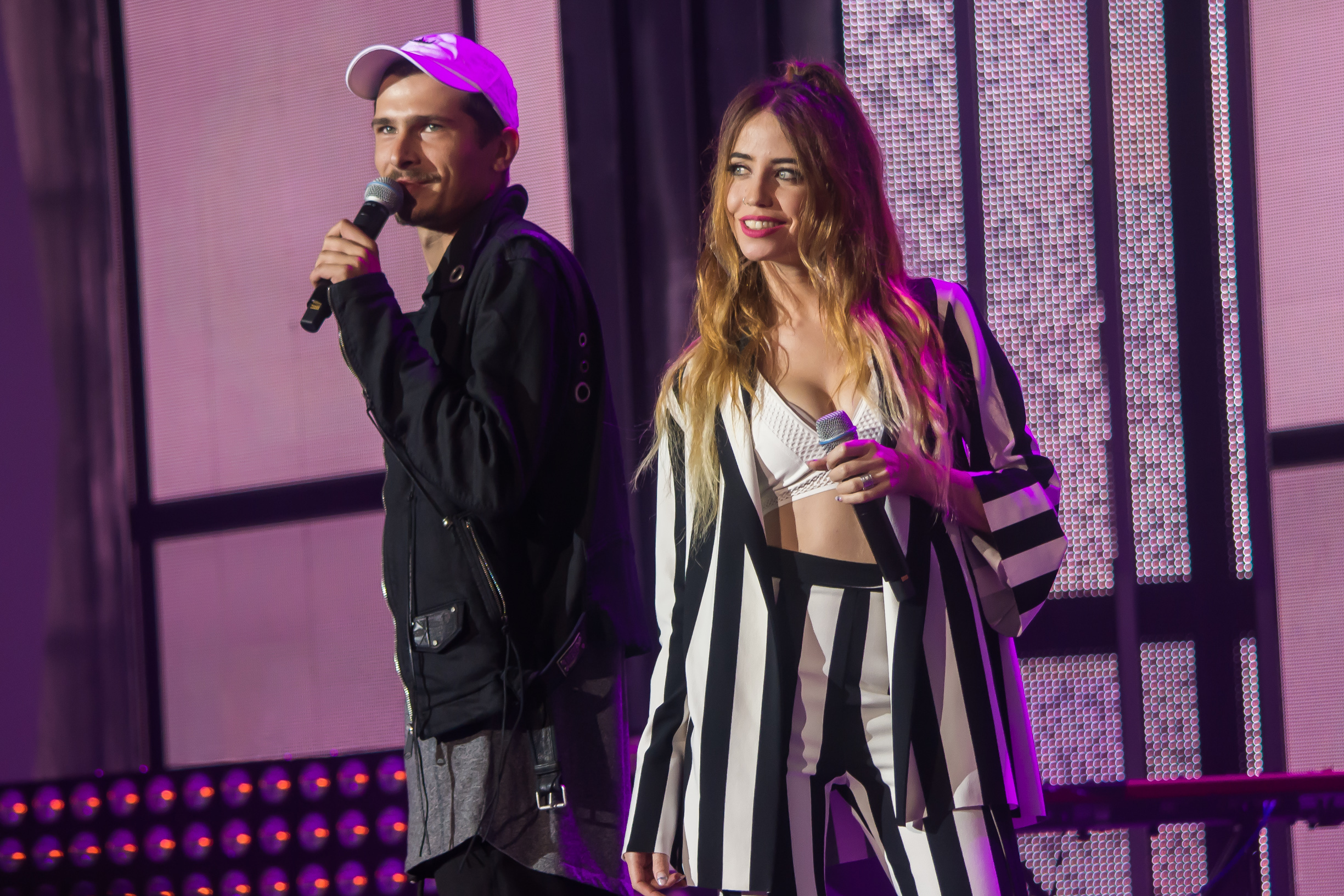
- Vremya i Steklo performing on Europa Plus TV Festival NON STOP in Vitebsk (2016)

Background information
- Origin: Ukraine
- Genres: Hip house
- Years active: 2010—2020; 2025
- Label: Mozgi Entertainment
- Past members: Oleksiy Zavgorodniy; Nadiya Dorofeeva

Vremya i Steklo (Russian: Время и Стекло, lit. 'Time and Glass', a pun on phrase время истекло meaning 'time's up') was a Ukrainian pop duo formed in 2010 by Oleksiy Potapenko, consisting of Oleksiy Zavhorodniy and Nadiya Dorofeeva. They are best known for their energetic blend of electronic and hip hop music, which has earned them widespread recognition in Eastern Europe and beyond.

The duo performed as guests at numerous music events across Russia and Ukraine, such as Golden Gramophone, Crimea Music Fest or Slavic Bazaar, and together voiced lead roles in the animated film The Stolen Princess, also performing its theme song «До зірок» ("To The Stars").

The group broke up in 2020, following the release of "Forever/Never" (Ukrainian: «Назавжди/Ніколи») music video, after which they held their last tour, concluding on October 30, 2020.

== History ==
In 2010, Irina Gorovoj and Oleksiy Potapenko formed the production company Mozgi Entertainment and invited Oleksiy Zavgorodniy to participate in their new project after his previous performances with Potapenko or with the group New'Z'Cool. A female vocalist was chosen to be Nadiya Dorofeeva, winner of the Black Sea Games from Simferopol, after a round of online casting, followed by direct casting in Kyiv. Their first single «Так випала Карта» ("The Card Fell Out Like This") was released on November 17, 2010, and within 10 days reached 5th place on YouTube's "World Musicians" chart.

The duo continued releasing mostly Russian–language singles throughout their career, translating a few to English, such as Harmonica (2013). After 2013, the group started performing on Ukrainian tours such as MOZGI TOUR and hosted the UA TOP 10 hit parade on the M1 channel. They reached widespread success with singles such as «Имя 505» ("Name 505") reaching #1 on Russian iTunes and Ukrainian YouTube.

In 2017, the duo took part in the Ukrainian The Voice Kids singing competition as coaches in its fourth season. They returned again in 2019 for the fifth season, with their contestant Oleksandr Zazarashvili winning the season. In 2018, the group released the single «Финальные Титры» ("Final Titles"), which became a theme song for the Ukrainian romantic comedy film Me. You. He. She. Lyena, one of the main characters, is played by Dorofeeva. That same year, both Zavgorodniy and Dorofeeva voiced the two main characters in the Ukrainian animated film The Stolen Princess, also performing the title song for this movie, «До зірок» ("To The Stars").

On March 10, 2020, the music video for their single «Назавжди/Ніколи» ("Forever/Never") was released, titled «Время истекло» ("Time's up"), hinting that the group is disbanding. This was confirmed the next day by both Zavgorodniy and Dorofeeva, noting that they are still good friends and will continue working together. The group also announced their last tour called «Фінальні Титри» ("Final Titles"), which was later postponed to October 2020 due to the coronavirus disease 2019 (COVID-19) pandemic. Before the postponed tour, the duo released their final song "Last Dance" on July 10. The tour was then also renamed to «Останній Танець» ("Last Dance") and it concluded on October 30 in Ukraina Palace of Arts.

In July 2025, the band reunited to support United24's "Guardians of the Sky" charity initiative.

== Discography ==
- Time And Glass (2014)
- Glubokiy dom (2015)
- Vislovo (2019)

=== Singles ===
- 2010 — «Так выпала Карта» (So the card fell out)
- 2011 — «Любви Точка Нет» (Love.net)
- 2011 — «Серебряное море» (Silver sea)
- 2011 — «Кафель» (Tile)
- 2012 — «Гармошка» (Harmonica)
- 2012 — «Слеза» (Tear)
- 2013 — «#кАроче» (#Shorter)
- 2013 — «Потанцуй со мной» (Dance with Me)
- 2014 — «Забери» (Take it)
- 2015 — «Имя 505» (Name 505)
- 2015 — «Песня 404» (song 404)
- 2015 — «Опасно 220» (Dangerous 220)
- 2015 — «Ритм 122» (Rhythm 122)
- 2016 — «Навернопотомучто» (Probably because)
- 2016 — «На Стиле» (In Style)
- 2017 — «Back2Leto»
- 2017 — «Тролль» (Troll)
- 2018 — «До зірок» (OST "Викрадена принцеса") (To the stars (OST "The Stolen Princess")
- 2018 — «ТОП» (TOP)
- 2018 — «Е,Бой» (Yeah, Boy)
- 2018 — «Песня про лицо» (The Song About Face)
- 2018 — «Финальные титры» (Final Credits)
- 2019 — «Дим» (Smoke)
- 2019 — «Vislovo»
- 2019 — «Лох» (Loser)
- 2020 — «Навсегда/Никогда» (Forever/Never)
- 2020 – «20s» (feat. MOZGI, U_C, Michelle Andrade)
- 2020 – «Last Dance» (Last Dance)
