= Monatik =

Ukrainian singer and dancer (born 1986)

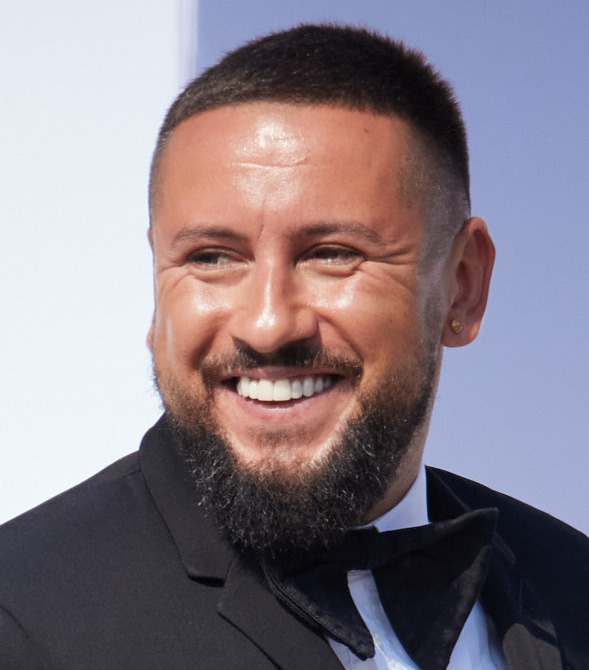
- Monatik in 2021

Background information
- Born: Dmytro Monatyk; 1 April 1986 (age 40); Lutsk, Volyn Oblast, Ukrainian SSR, Soviet Union
- Origin: Lutsk, Ukraine
- Genres: Pop; R&B; funk
- Occupations: Singer; songwriter; artist
- Years active: 2009–present
- Label: Monatik Chilibi Sound
- Website: www.monatik.com

Dmytro Serhiiovych Monatyk (Ukrainian: Дмитро́ Сергі́йович Мона́тик; born 1 April 1986), professionally known as Monatik (stylised in all caps), is a Ukrainian singer, songwriter, dancer, and composer.

He opened the first semi-final of the Eurovision Song Contest 2017 on 9 May.

== Biography ==
=== Early years ===
From 2000 to 2006, Monatyk was a member of the Lutsk Breakdance Group 'DBS Crew', which became the best 'B-boy' group in West Ukraine. In 2003, he went to the Law Faculty of the Interregional Academy of Personnel Management, where in his free time he danced and learned music. After finishing his university, he received the specialization of a lawyer.

=== Popularity ===
In 2008, he became a finalist during the audition for the second season of Fabryka Zirok, but he did not become a part of this project. This year singer Natalia Mohylevska asked Dmytro to work on her ballet, during her concert program 'Real O'. This became a true turning point for him because he agreed and moved to Kyiv.

In 2008, he got together his first music group 'Monatique', which survived through 2 live concerts in Lutsk. They played in the funk and soul genre. In 2009, he passed the audition to join 'D'arts', where during the 2 years he went through a lot of events: in 2010 the ballet 'Girl with the Matches' was set by the director of the ballet and part of the cast for the ballet 'The Republic of Qazan Tip'.

=== Beginning of his solo career ===
In the summer of 2011, Monatyk's first solo song "ТайУлетаю" came out, whose music video was filmed on a mobile device. During this year, many popular stars invited Dmytro to join them in their music videos: Potap & Nastya for "Выкрутасы", Infinity for "Ну и пусть", and INKA for "Pump it". He was also the choreographer for Yolka's music video "На большом воздушном шаре".

=== Career growth ===
In August 2012, Monatyk first stepped in the role of a composer. He presented Svetlana Loboda's song "40 градусов" during Crimea Music Fest.

In the summer of 2012, Monatyk tried himself again in the role of a composer in a few episodes of the project «Альо, Директор!» (English: Hello, director!) with Loboda on the channel TET.

In November 2012, Monatik performed on the Ukrainian X-Factor as a guest performer.

After he released the tracks "Воздух", "ТерроризирУ.Е.т", and "Важно" in 2012, he initiated an audition for his ballet and chose four best dancers. Together they toured around Ukraine, Belarus and Russia.

In April 2013, it was reported that "Monatik gave a start to the solo career of Eva Bushmina" by writing her the song "Собой". The spring and summer of this year were successful for him, and he presented another three tracks: "Прости…", "Саундтрек сегодняшнЕГО дня", and "ДыМ". In May of the same year, he announced the premiere of his music video for "Прости…" (English: Forgive). June 2013 bought around the premiere of his song "Клавіши" (English: Keys), which he wrote with his fellow countryman, a Lutsk rapper called KOVALERO.

On 8 November 2013, he presented to the public his new single «Улыбаясь» (English: Smile) with the slogan «Живи, люби, борися — "УЛЫБАЯСЬ"» (English: Live, Love, Fight – Smile).

On 12 December 2014, during his large solo concert in Kyiv, he presented his debut solo album «Саундтрек сегодняшнЕГО дня (С. С. Д.)» (English: Soundtrack of Today).

5 June 2014 – On the internet and on major mainstream music channels he airs his new clip «В лучшем свете» (English: In a Better World), whose director was dancer Анатолій Сачівко. Later, his video receive positive feedback from Alan Badoev, one of the best Ukrainian clip-makers.

24 August 2014 – Dmytro released the Ukrainian song «Може, вже досить» (English: Maybe that's enough), which main message was the termination of the war on Donbas between Ukraine and Russia. In November he visited Kyiv, Odesa, Lviv, Dnipropetrovsk (Dnipro), Kharkiv with his tour «Сейчас» (English: Now). This happened when he released his single of the same name.

At the beginning of 2015, he participated in two successful duets with his own songs – with Anna Sedokova (song «Тише» (English: Quieter)) and «Quest Pistols Show» (song «Мокрая» (English: Wet)). Both songs had music videos which accompanied them.

25 May 2016, marked his second album «Звучит» (English: Sounds), which as made up of 16 tracks.

In February 2017, there was news that Monatik was meant to perform in Moscow, however this event was later cancelled because of political reasons.

9 May 2017 – Dmytro performed during the opening of the first semi-final of the Eurovision Song Contest 2017 in Kyiv, where he sung his song «Кружит» (English: Spinning) in English.

In Spring 2017, he became a Judge on the Ukrainian Dancing With The Stars, season 2 program.

In 2017, he took part as a coach in the Ukrainian The Voice Kids, season 4, which occurred during the second half of 2017. Daneliya Tuleshova, who was on Monatik's team, was crowned winner of the fourth season.

His show «Vitamin D», the presentation of which occurred during October 2017 in Palace of Sports, Kyiv, was acknowledged as the «Best Concert Show» according to the musical award YUNA, and the TV award «TeleTriumph». The broadcasting of the show happened on 1+1 during New Year's Eve.

In January 2018, he made an appearance for an advertisement with the Russian operator MegaFon.

In April 2018, Monatik released a single track «Цей день» (English: This Day) with Nina Matviyenko, and in July he released a single with Nadya Dorofeeva called «Глубоко» (English: Deep).

== Albums ==
=== Саундтрек сегодняшнЕГО дня (С. С. Д.) (2013) (English: Soundtrack of Today) ===
1. «Intro» (English: Intro)
2. «Дым» (English: Smoke)
3. «ТайУлетаю» (English: I Flew Away)
4. «Важно» (English: Important)
5. «Саундтрек сегодняшнЕГО дня (С. С. Д.)» (English: Soundtrack of Today)
6. «Воздух» (English: Air)
7. «Прости…» (English: Forgive)
8. «Улыбаясь» (English: Smile)
9. «В лучшем свете» (English: In a Better World)
10. «Жадная» (English: Greedy)
11. «ТерроризирУ. Е.т» (English: Terrorises)
12. «Прости…» (GreenLeto & Sam Radeo Remix) [Extended Version] (English: Forgive)
13. «Важно» (live acoustic version) (feat. Open Kids) (English: Difficult)

=== Звучит (2016) (English: Sounds) ===
1. Мудрые деревья (English: Smart Trees)
2. Кружит (English: Spinning)
3. Тише (з Анною Сєдоковою) (English: Quieter)
4. Музыкально-танцевальная терапия (English: Musical-Dancing Therapy)
5. Пока ты на танцполе (English: Whilst you're on the dancefloor)
6. Мокрая (з Quest Pistols Show) (English: Wet)
7. Путь (English: Path)
8. УВЛИУВТ (Упали в любовь и ударились в танцы) (English: We fell in love and hit up dancing)
9. Каждый из нас (English: Everyone of us)
10. Ещё один (English: Another one)
11. Засияем (English: Light up)
12. Сейчас (English: Now)
13. Вот наше время! (English: Here's our time!)
14. Выходной (English: Holiday)
15. Ты... (English: You)
16. Вечность (English: Eternity)

== Singles ==
- «ТайУлетаю» (2011) (English: I Flew Away)
- «Воздух» (2012) (English: Air)
- «ТерроризирУ.Е.т» (2012) (English: Terrorizing)
- «Важно» (2012) (English: Important)
- «Прости…»(2013) (English: Forgive)
- «Клавіші» (ft. KOVALERO) (2013) (English: Keys)
- «Саундтрек сегодняшнЕГО дня» (2013) (English: Soundtrack of Today)
- «Дым» (2013) (English: Smoke)
- «Улыбаясь» (2013) (English: Smiling)
- «В лучшем свете» (2014) (English: In a Better World)
- «Може, вже досить» (2014) (English: Maybe that's enough)
- «Сейчас» (2014) (English: Now)
- «Тише» (з Ганною Сєдоковою) (2015) (English: Quieter)
- «Мокрая» (з Quest Pistols Show) (2015) (English: Wet)
- «Выходной» (2015) (English: Holiday)
- «Друг мой дорогой» (саундтрек «По той бік»/«По ту сторону») (2016) (English: My dear friend (Soundtrack to On the other side))
- Vitamin D (2017)
- «То, о чего без ума» (English: That, What Makes Me Crazy)
- «Цей день» (ft. Ніна Матвієнко) (English: This Day)
- «Глубоко…» (ft. Надя Дорофеева) (English: Deep)

== Music videos ==
No.	Music Video	Year	Director
1	I Flew Away (ТайУлетаю)	2011	
2	Air (Воздух)	2012	
3	Terrorizing (ТерроризирУ. Е.т)	2012	
4	Difficult (Важно (live acoustic version) (feat. Open Kids))	2012	
5	Forgive (Прости...)	2013	Mykola Boichenko (Микола Бойченко)
6	Keys (Клавіші (ft. KOVALERO))	2013	Andriy Lucanov (Андрій Лисанов)
7	In a Better World (В лучшем свете)	2014	Anatoliy Sachivko (Анатолій Сачівко)
8	Quieter (Тише (з Ганною Седоковою))	2015	Sergiy Hyman (Сергій Гуман)
9	Wet (Мокрая (з Quest Pistols Show))	2015	Yuriy Bardash (Юрій Бардаш)
10	Now (Сейчас)	2015	Taras Holybkov (Тарас Голубков)
11	Holiday (Выходной)	2016	Tetyana Myino (Тетяна Муіньо)
12	Spinning (Кружит)	2016	Tetyana Myino (Тетяна Муіньо)
13	Eternity (Вечность)	2016	Tetyana Myino (Тетяна Муіньо)
14	We fell in love and hit up dancing (УВЛИУВТ (Упали в любовь и ударились в танцы))	2017	Tetyana Myino (Тетяна Муіньо)
15	Vitamin D	2017	Tetyana Myino (Тетяна Муіньо)
16	That, What Makes Me Crazy (То, от чего без ума)	2017	Tetyana Myino (Тетяна Муіньо)
17	Deep (Глубоко (разом з Надією Дорофєєвой))	2017	Tetyana Myino (Тетяна Муіньо)

=== Took part in these music videos ===
Year	Name in Ukrainian	Name in English
2016	«Под дождём» (разом з Грін Грей)	Under the Rain (with Green Grey)
2016	«Сон» (разом з L'One)	Dream (with L'One)

== Film and TV ==
- Appears in some episodes of «Повернення Мухтара» та «Щоденники темного». (English: The Return of Myhtar and the Diaries of the Dark).
- He took part in the show Танцюють всі-3 (English: Everyone Dances-3).
- He was a finalist in the show X-Factor Ukraine.
- 2012 – Becomes a finalist in the show «Зірковий ринг» (English: Star ring).
- 2016 – Coach in The Voice Kids Ukraine on the Ukrainian Channel 1+1.
- 2016 – He took part in the Ukrainian voice-over for the movie Sing, where he voice Eddie the Sheep
- 2 Feb 2017 – Advert for Samsung with Monatik featured.
- Aug 2017 – Became a judge in the second season of the Ukrainian Dancing with the Stars.
- 2018 – Played a role in the comedy «Скажене весілля» (English: Crazy Wedding).

== Nominations and awards ==
Year	Award	Nomination	Result	Comments
2014	Yearly Ukrainian National Awards	Best composer	Nominated	
2014	Yearly Ukrainian National Awards	Best song	Won	For the song for Svitlana Loboda «40 degrees»
2015	Yearly Ukrainian National Awards	Best singer	Nominated	
2015	M1 Music Awards	Breakthrough of the year	Won	
2016	M1 Music Awards	Best singer	Won	
2016	M1 Music Awards	DANCE PARADE (with Kiss FM)	Nominated	Song «Кружит»
2016	Russian National Music Awards	Best Dance Hit of the Year	Won	Song «Кружит»
2017	Yearly Ukrainian National Awards	Best album	Won	Album«Звучит»
2017	Yearly Ukrainian National Awards	Best music video	Won	Music Video«Кружит» (Director Tetyana Myino)
2017	Yearly Ukrainian National Awards	Best song	Nominated	Song «Кружит»
2017	VIVA! Most Beautiful	Breakthrough of the Year	Won	
2017	M1 Music Awards	Best singer	Nominated	
2017	M1 Music Awards	DANCE PARADE (with Kiss FM)	Won	Song «Vitamin D»
2017	Elle Style Awards 2017	Best Singer	Won	
2017	Elle Digital Awards	One Day Elle MAN with Star	Won	
2017	Men's Magazine "XXL"	Musician of the Year	Won	
2018	Teletriumph	Best Concert Show	Won	For the Concert Show «Vitamin D»
2019	Russian National Music Awards	Best Male Singer in Popular Music	Nominated	

== Links ==
- Eurovision Song Contest 2017 performance
