= Holos Krainy season 13 =

Holos Krainy
- Season 13
- Hosted by: Yuriy Horbunov; Kateryna Osadcha
- Coaches: Ivan Klymenko; Nadya Dorofeeva; Artem Pyvovarov; Julia Sanina
- No. of contestants: 40
- Winner: Mykhailo Panchyshyn
- Winning coach: Artem Pyvovarov
- Runner-up: Yuriy Horodets'kyy

Release
- Original network: 1+1 Ukraine
- Original release: 3 September – 29 October 2023

Season chronology
- ← Previous; Season 12 Next → Season 14

The 13th season of the Ukrainian reality talent show Holos Krainy premiered on 3 September 2023, broadcasting every Sunday at 21h (9 p.m) evenings on 1+1 Ukraine. From the previous season, only Nadya Dorofeeva returned as coach, alongside three debuting coaches: Julia Sanina, Artem Pyvovarov, and Ivan Klymenko. This season axed the "Second Chance" (Другий шанс) coaches, which were introduced last season.

This season is also called the European Season because it is the first season in the entire The Voice franchise to be held across Europe, due to the Russian invasion of Ukraine. The show introduced a custom-designed train to Poland, as the competition would be held on the set of The Voice of Poland.

On 29 October, Mykhailo Panchyshyn was named the winner by the public, marking Artem Pyvovarov's first win as a coach.

== Teams ==
Color key

- Winner
- Runner-up
- Third place
- Eliminated in the Live finale
- Eliminated in the Cross battles
- Eliminated in the Battles

Coaches	Top 40 Artists				
Ivan Klymenko					
Ivan Klymenko	Anastasiya Chaban	Veronika Kovalenko	Ol'ha Shcherbak & Oleksandra Roiko	Yelyzaveta Shaforost	Andrii Zasik
Ivan Klymenko	Kateryna Kozlova	NaYada	Anna Korchenova	Daiana Oravets	
Nadya Dorofeeva					
Nadya Dorofeeva	Yuriy Horodets'kyy	Mairamik Avoian	Roman Panchenko	Edhar Yenokian	Kateryna Stefaniuk
Nadya Dorofeeva	Yuliia Belei	Liudmyla Kozyreva & Marek Mokhnach	Lada Tyvonchuk	Anna Denysova	Oleksandra Lishchuk
Artem Pyvovarov					
Artem Pyvovarov	Mykhailo Panchyshyn	Izabella Ivashchenko	Hidayat Seidov	Vlad Sheryf	Oleksandra Pohuliai
Artem Pyvovarov	Khrystyna Arutiunova	Viktoriia Derkach	Veronika Martyniuk	Kateryna Dryhalo	Oleksandra Vdovychenko
Julia Sanina					
Julia Sanina	Khrystyna Starykova	Halyna Pechenizhs'ka	Vlad Pelykh	Mariia Stasiuk	Dar'ya Minyeyeva
Julia Sanina	Oleksandra Makarovs'ka	Nazaryi Malynovskyi	Andrii Zhuchkovskyi	Volodymyr Udovenko	Svitlana Cherednychenko

== Blind auditions ==
Each coach needs to recruit 10 artists in their teams.

Blind auditions color key
✔	Coach pressed the "I WANT YOU" button
✔	Coach pressed the "I WANT YOU" button despite having their team full
	Artist defaulted to this coach's team
	Artist elected this coach's team
	Artist was eliminated since no coach pressed their button

=== Episode 1 (3 September) ===
First episode results
Order	Artist	Age	Song	Coach's and artist's choices			
Order	Artist	Age	Song	Ivan	Dorofeeva	Pyvovarov	Julia
1	Halyna Pechenizhs'ka	33	"Kupala"	✔	✔	✔	✔
2	Hidayat Seidov	23	"Love in the Dark"	✔	✔	✔	✔
3	Yuriy Horodets'kyy	25	"Yak tebe ne liubyty, Kyieve mii!"	✔	✔	—	—
4	Volodymyr Svatiev & Zofyia Pazdan	22, 18	"Nie ma fal"	—	—	—	—
5	Artem Krykin	22	"Stefania"	—	—	—	—
6	Dar'ya Minyeyeva	38	"Flowers"	✔	✔	✔	✔
7	Oleksandra Lishchuk	22	"Misto Marii" (original song)	—	✔	—	—
8	Volodymyr Udovenko	29	"Prirva"	—	—	✔	✔
9	Ol'ha Shcherbak	17	"Lyudy"	✔	✔	—	—
10	Oleksandra Makarovs'ka	34	"As It Was"	—	—	—	✔
11	Yanko Peniafort & Los iankovers	28	"Nese Halia vodu"	—	—	—	—
12	Yuliya Yaroshenko	25	"Pisnia bude pomizh nas"	—	—	—	—
13	Anastasiya Chaban	21	"Votsap"	✔	✔	✔	✔

=== Episode 2 (10 September) ===
Second episode results
Order	Artist	Age	Song	Coach's and artist's choices			
Order	Artist	Age	Song	Ivan	Dorofeeva	Pyvovarov	Julia
1	Mairamik Avoian	18	"Stand Up"	✔	✔	✔	✔
2	Vlad Pelykh	16	"BRONIA"	✔	✔	✔	✔
3	Andriana Borovyk	21	"Yak ty?"	—	—	—	—
4	Mykhailo Panchyshyn (Ptashkin)	25	"Nevidomyi Heroi" (original song)	✔	✔	✔	✔
5	Mariia Stasiuk	28	"Island"	—	—	✔	✔
6	Anna Korchenova	26	"Karpatskyi rap"	✔	✔	—	—
7	Anton Kuriata	30	"Lastivky"	—	—	—	—
8	Viktoriia Derkach	26	"Dumy"	—	✔	✔	—
9	Khrystyna Arutiunova	27	"Jericho"	—	✔	✔	—
10	Daryna Shadurska	21	"Sara perche ti amo"	—	—	—	—
11	Edhar Yenokian (DOBRYVA band)	25	"Svitlo ye chy nema" (original song)	✔	✔	—	—
12	Sofiia Shcherbakova	19	"Yin-Yang"	—	—	—	—
13	Vlad Sheryf	24	"Tattoo"	✔	✔	✔	✔

=== Episode 3 (17 September) ===
Third episode results
Order	Artist	Age	Song	Coach's and artist's choices			
Order	Artist	Age	Song	Ivan	Dorofeeva	Pyvovarov	Julia
1	Roman Panchenko	27	"A Sky Full of Stars"	✔	✔	✔	—
2	NaYada	–	"Hulialy"	✔	—	✔	✔
3	Brevis	–	"Diamonds"	—	—	—	—
4	Lada Tyvonchuk	25	"Halaktyka" (original song)	—	✔	—	—
5	Oleksandra Klymenko	20	"Hush Hush; Hush Hush"	—	—	—	—
6	Nazaryi Malynovskyi	25	"Bruises"	✔	✔	—	✔
7	Oleksandra Roiko	20	"Kotyku sirenkyi"	✔	✔	—	—
8	Viktoriia Rodko	30	"Dva vikna"	—	—	—	—
9	Veronika Kovalenko	19	"Unholy"	✔	✔	✔	—
10	Liudmyla Kozyreva & Marek Mokhnach	31, 37	"Oi, mamo liubliu Hyrtsia"	—	✔	—	—
11	Tatiana Trush	28	"Lift Me Up"	—	—	—	—
12	Oleksandra Vdovychenko	28	"Chekaie vdoma"	—	✔	✔	—
13	Khrystyna Starykova	17	"golden hour"	✔	✔	✔	✔

=== Episode 4 (24 September) ===
Fourth episode results
Order	Artist	Age	Song	Coach's and artist's choices			
Order	Artist	Age	Song	Ivan	Dorofeeva	Pyvovarov	Julia
1	Izabella Ivashchenko	21	"Space Man"	✔	✔	✔	✔
2	Daiana Oravets	24	"Bureviiamy"	✔	✔	—	—
3	Andrii Zasik	27	"Creepin'"	✔	—	—	—
4	Svitlana Cherednychenko	28	"Znaiu ya"	✔	✔	✔	✔
5	Kateryna Kozlova	–	"Bleeding Love"	✔	—	—	—
6	Tetiana Kolii	45	"Chekai"	—	—	—	—
7	Kateryna Dryhalo	20	"Komet"	✔	—	✔	—
8	Kateryna Stefaniuk	23	"Miss You"	✔	✔	—	—
9	Yuliia Belei	34	"Mamo tyś płakała"	✔	✔	—	—
10	Anna Denysova	29	"Say It Right"	—	✔	—	—
11	Veronika Martyniuk	20	"Rody, bozhe, zhyto"	✔	Team full	✔	—
12	Andrii Zhuchkovskyi	–	"Harno tak"	✔	Team full	—	✔
13	Yelyzaveta Shaforost	18	"Nothing Breaks Like a Heart"	✔	Team full	✔	Team full
14	Yuliia Solovei	25	"Poobitsiai meni"	Team full	Team full	—	Team full
15	Oleksandra Pohuliai	27	"Always Remember Us This Way"	✔	✔	✔	✔

== Battles ==
In the battles (boi in Ukrainian), the coaches divide their contestants into four battles to sing a song together. Out of ten, only four contestants remain in each team and advance to the cross battles, which means one battle could have one, multiple or no winners. For the first time since season 2, there were no steals in the battles. In addition, coaches' advisors help them on deciding who advances to the next round; the advisors were Kalush Orchestra for Team Ivan, Max Barskih for Team Dorofeeva, Kola for Team Pyvovarov, and Jerry Heil for Team Julia.

Battles color key
Artist won the battle and advanced to the cross battles
Artist lost the battle and was eliminated

=== Episode 5 (1 October) ===
Fifth episode results
Coach	Order	Winner(s)	Song	Loser(s)
Ivan	1	Anastasiya Chaban	"Diamonds"	Daiana Oravets
Ivan	2	Veronika Kovalenko	"Bloody Mary"	N/A
Ivan	2	Yelyzaveta Shaforost	"Bloody Mary"	N/A
Ivan	3	N/A	"Beggin'"	Anna Korchenova
Ivan	3	N/A	"Beggin'"	NaYada
Ivan	3	N/A	"Beggin'"	Kateryna Kozlova
Ivan	4	Ol'ha Scherbak (Note: Ivan Klymenko opted to take both Ol'ha Scherbak and Oleksandra Roiko through as a duo for the remainder of their time in the competition.)	"Povilno"	Andrii Zasik
Ivan	4	Oleksandra Roiko	"Povilno"	Andrii Zasik
Julia	5	Halyna Pechenizhs'ka	"Nebo khylytsia"	Volodymyr Udovenko
Julia	5	Halyna Pechenizhs'ka	"Nebo khylytsia"	Svitlana Cherednychenko
Julia	6	Khrystyna Starykova	"Running Up That Hill"	N/A
Julia	6	Vlad Pelykh	"Running Up That Hill"	N/A
Julia	7	N/A	"Ya yidu dodomu"	Andrii Zhuchkovskyi
Julia	7	N/A	"Ya yidu dodomu"	Nazaryi Malynovskyi
Julia	8	Mariia Stasiuk	"Survivor"	Dar'ya Minyeyeva
Julia	8	Mariia Stasiuk	"Survivor"	Oleksandra Makarovs'ka

=== Episode 6 (8 October) ===
Sixth episode results
Coach	Order	Winner(s)	Song	Loser(s)
Dorofeeva	1	Edhar Yenokian	"Makeba"	Oleksandra Lishchuk
Dorofeeva	2	Roman Panchenko	"What Was I Made For?"	Lada Tyvonchuk
Dorofeeva	2	Roman Panchenko	"What Was I Made For?"	Anna Denysova
Dorofeeva	3	Yuriy Horodets'kyy	"Hey, sokoly"	Liudmyla Kozyreva & Marek Mokhnach
Dorofeeva	4	Mairamik Avoian	"How Will I Know"	Kateryna Stefaniuk
Dorofeeva	4	Mairamik Avoian	"How Will I Know"	Yuliia Belei
Pyvovarov	5	Mykhailo Panchyshyn	"I Wanna Be Your Slave"	Oleksandra Vdovychenko
Pyvovarov	5	Mykhailo Panchyshyn	"I Wanna Be Your Slave"	Kateryna Dryhalo
Pyvovarov	6	N/A	"Stozhary & Oi na hory"	Veronika Martyniuk
Pyvovarov	6	N/A	"Stozhary & Oi na hory"	Viktoriia Derkach
Pyvovarov	7	Izabella Ivashchenko	"Waiting All Night"	N/A
Pyvovarov	7	Vlad Sheryf	"Waiting All Night"	N/A
Pyvovarov	8	Hidayat Seidov	"Halo"	Oleksandra Pohuliai
Pyvovarov	8	Hidayat Seidov	"Halo"	Khrystyna Arutiunova

== Cross battles ==
In the cross battles, one contestant from one team gets paired with a contestant from another team and both artists sing to win the audience vote. The winner of each cross battle moves to the final, while the other artist is eliminated from the competition. Also, due to the results of this round being solely for the artist, it was not guaranteed that all coaches would be represented in the finale, which eventually did not happen.

Cross battles color key
Artist won the cross battle and advanced to the final
Artist lost the cross battle and was eliminated

=== Episode 7 (15 October) ===
Seventh episode results
Order	Challenger				Challenged			
Order	Coach	Song	Artist	%	%	Artist	Song	Coach
1	Dorofeeva	"Formidable"	Roman Panchenko	63%	37%	Yelyzaveta Shaforost	"The Kill"	Ivan
2	Ivan	"Oceans (Where Feet May Fail)"	Ol'ha Shcherbak & Oleksandra Roiko	28%	72%	Vlad Pelykh	"River"	Julia
3	Julia	"Poshta"	Mariia Stasiuk	44%	56%	Mykhailo Panchyshyn	"Bilia topoli"	Pyvovarov
4	Pyvovarov	"Druh"	Vlad Sheryf	37%	63%	Anastasiya Chaban	"Fortetsia Bakhmut"	Ivan

=== Episode 8 (22 October) ===
Eighth episode results
Order	Challenger				Challenged			
Order	Coach	Song	Artist	%	%	Artist	Song	Coach
1	Ivan	"Bilia sertsia"	Veronika Kovalenko	49%	51%	Mairamik Avoian	"In deinen Armen"	Dorofeeva
2	Dorofeeva	"Kokhayu, ale ne zovsim"	Edhar Yenokian	46%	54%	Halyna Pechenizhs'ka	"What's Love Got to Do with It"	Julia
3	Julia	"Oi ty, zhaivoronku"	Khrystyna Starykova	68%	32%	Hidayat Seidov	"I Surrender"	Pyvovarov
4	Pyvovarov	"Infinity"	Izabella Ivashchenko	29%	71%	Yuriy Horodets'kyy	"Brattia Ukraintsi"	Dorofeeva

== Live show ==
Just like the previous season, there was only one live episode: the finale. The show was divided into three rounds. In the first round, the top 8 artists performed and the top 4, regardless of team, advanced to the superfinal via the public vote. In round two, the remaining four artists sang a duet with their coach, and the public voted for the top 2. In round three, the remaining two artists sung for the audience's vote to determine the winner.

Live show color key
Artist advanced to the second round
Artist was eliminated

=== Episode 9 – Finale (29 October) ===
Finale results
Round	Coach	Order	Artist	Song	Result
Round one	Dorofeeva	1	Mairamik Avoian	"Euphoria"	Eliminated
Round one	Ivan	2	Anastasiya Chaban	"Unochi"	Public's vote
Round one	Julia	3	Khrystyna Starykova	"Arcade"	Public's vote
Round one	Dorofeeva	4	Yuriy Horodets'kyy	"Misto spyt"	Public's vote
Round one	Julia	5	Halyna Pechenizhs'ka	"Napravlyay mene"	Eliminated
Round one	Julia	6	Vlad Pelykh	"Another Love"	Eliminated
Round one	Dorofeeva	7	Roman Panchenko	"Obiymy"	Eliminated
Round one	Pyvovarov	8	Mykhailo Panchyshyn	"The Show Must Go On"	Public's vote
Round two	Pyvovarov	1	Mykhailo Panchyshyn	"Manifest"	Public's vote
Round two	Julia	2	Khrystyna Starykova	"Melodiya"	Third place
Round two	Ivan	3	Anastasiya Chaban	"Pid krylom"	Third place
Round two	Dorofeeva	4	Yuriy Horodets'kyy	"Dumy"	Public's vote
Round three	Dorofeeva	1	Yuriy Horodets'kyy	"Kyieve mii"	Runner-up
Round three	Pyvovarov	2	Mykhailo Panchyshyn	"Nevidomyi Heroi"	Winner
