= Ivan Klymenko =

Ukrainian musician, producer and songwriter

Ivan Klymenko Іван Клименко
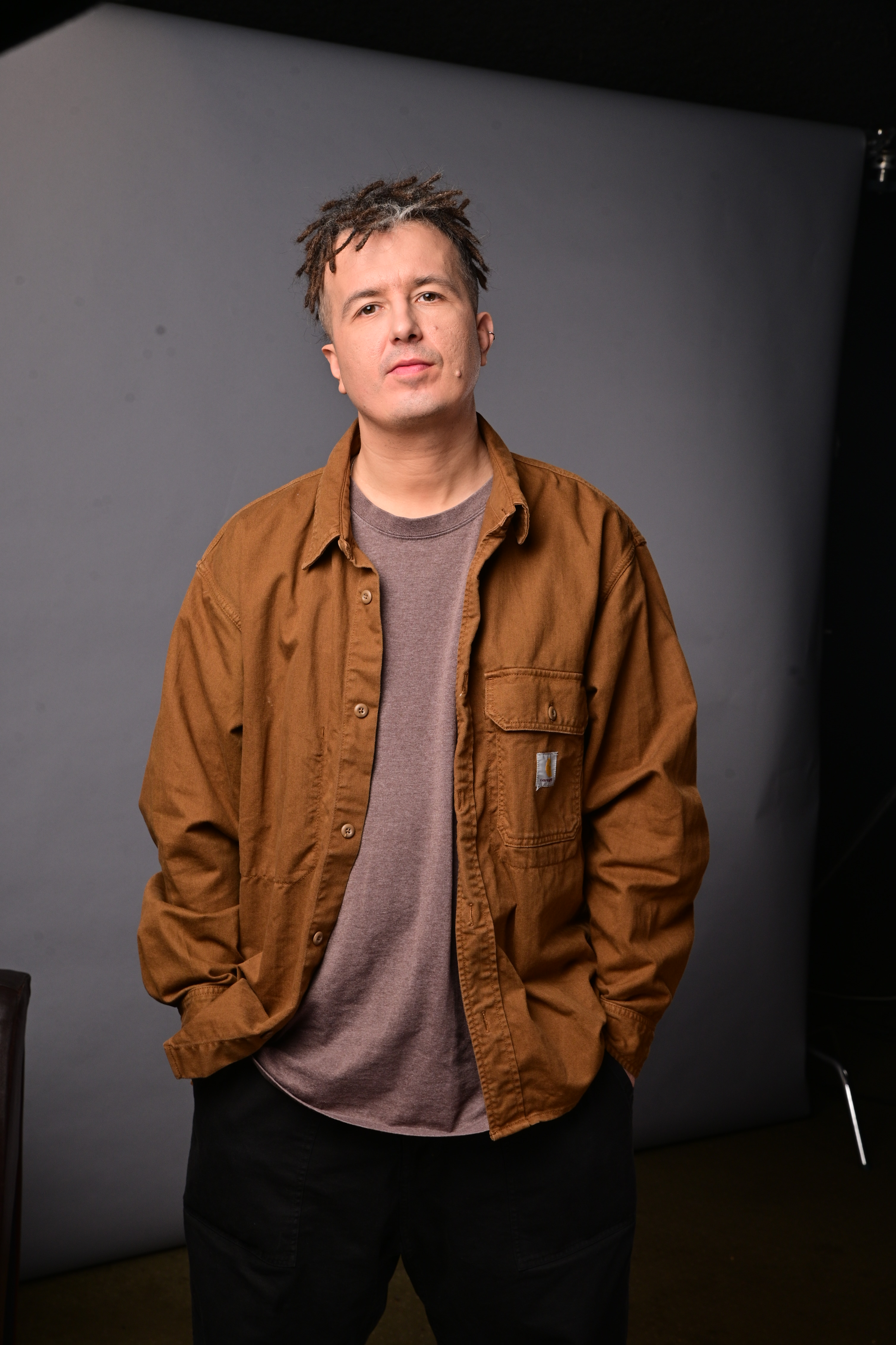
- Klymenko in 2024

Background information
- Born: Ivan Petrovych Klymenko; 20 January 1987 (age 39); Kyiv, Ukrainian SSR, Soviet Union
- Genres: Pop, hip-hop, folk pop, urban pop, indie pop
- Occupations: Music producer, songwriter

Ivan Petrovych "Vanyok" Klymenko (Ukrainian: Іван Петрович "Ваньок" Клименко; born 20 January 1987) is a Ukrainian music producer and songwriter. He is known for writing several tracks that have competed to be Ukraine's entry in the Eurovision Song Contest, including the song "Stefania" which won the Eurovision Song Contest 2022.

== Biography ==
Klymenko was born in Kyiv. Early on in his career, he was a street musician in China. Klymenko founded the band "Salto Nazad" and the label "Enko". He has worked with Kalush Orchestra, Jamala, Alyona Alyona, Jerry Heil, Kola, Skofka, Kozak Siromaha and is the author of more than 300 tracks, including Ukrainian-language singles by Dorofeeva, "Chuty Himn" (Skofka), "Zori" (Kalush). As of June 2023, 20 of his songs were on the Apple Music Ukraine Top 100 chart. Klymenko invented the character of KylymMen, who has contributed to the Kalush Orchestra band.

In 2023, he became a coach on the 13th season of Holos Krainy alongside Dorofeeva, Artem Pyvovarov, and Julia Sanina, where he was the first non-singer coach on the show.

== Songwriting discography ==
=== Entries in national Eurovision pre-selections ===
2017

- "We Are One" by MamaRika (Ukraine 2017), 5th place (Semi-final)
- "O, mamo!" by Salto Nazad (Ukraine 2017), 6th place

2019

- "2 dni" by Laud (Ukraine 2019), 4th place (Semi-final)

2022

- "Stefania" by Kalush Orchestra (Ukraine 2022), 2nd place

2023

- "When God Shut the Door" by Jerry Heil (Ukraine 2023), 3rd place

2024

- "Teresa & Maria" by Alyona Alyona and Jerry Heil (Ukraine 2024), 1st place

2025

- "Kohoney" by Grisana (Ukraine 2025), 7th place (online wildcard)
- (Republic of Ireland) "Run into the Night" by Adgy (Ireland 2025), 6th place

2026

- "Say It All" by Oks (Ukraine 2026), 5th place (online wildcard)

=== Other notable songs ===
- "Золотыми рыбками" - by MakSim (2015)
- "Непохожие" - by Quest Pistols Show (2016)
- "Вылечи мою любовь" - by Yaav (2018)
- "Голови" - by Alyona Alyona (2018)
- "Відчиняй" - by Alyona Alyona (2018)
- "Падло" - by Alyona Alyona & Alina Pash (2019)
- "Прости" - by Anna Sedokova (2021)
- "Лише тебе" - by Anna Trincher (2021)
- "Інь Ян" - by Monatik & Roxolana (2022)
- "Nasze Domy" - by Kalush Orchestra & Szpaku (2022)
- "Біля серця" - by Kola (2022)
- "Cry For You" - by Ochman & Kalush Orchestra (2023)
- "Bronia" - by Jerry Heil & Ochman (2023)
- "вотсап" - by Dorofeeva (2023)
- "Хай пишуть" - by Dorofeeva (2023)

== Awards ==
Year	Subject	Category	Awards	Result	Ref
2023	"Liudy" / «Люди» – Kola і MamaRika	Best author	Muzvar Awards	Won	
