= Holos Krainy season 12 =

Holos Krainy
- Season 12
- Hosted by: Yuriy Horbunov; Kateryna Osadcha
- Coaches: Svyatoslav Vakarchuk; Nadya Dorofeeva; Potap; Olya Polyakova; Oleksandra Zaritska & Andriy Matsola (Second Chance)
- Winner: Maria Kvitka
- Winning coach: Oleksandra Zaritska & Andriy Matsola
- Runner-up: Vasyl Paluh

Release
- Original network: 1+1; TET
- Original release: January 23 – November 20, 2022

Season chronology
- Next → Season 13

The twelfth season of the Ukrainian reality talent show Holos Krainy premiered on 23 January, broadcasting every Sunday at 21h (9 p.m) on 1+1. From the previous season, only Nadya Dorofeeva returned as coach, while Potap and Svyatoslav Vakarchuk returned to the show after their two-season and five-season hiatuses, respectively. In the meantime, they were joined by first-time coach, Olya Polyakova.

For this season, the Comeback Stage (which was first introduced in the fifteenth season of American version of The Voice) was introduced under the name "Другий шанс", meaning "Second Chance", and it was exclusively broadcast on the show's official YouTube channel. Hence, for the first time in the Ukrainian version, a fifth coach was added: the duo Andriy Matsola and Oleksandra Zaritska (who was a contestant in season four). To form their team, this duo coach selects contestants who performed in the main competition and failed to advance to the next rounds.

Following the 2022 Russian invasion of Ukraine, the season was suspended after only six episodes were broadcast. However, the show returned on 2 October on a new channel, TET, as 1+1 was only broadcasting emergency news about the war. Episodes six to eleven were initially recorded before 24 February 2022. Due to this, all of the Russian-language dialogue in these episodes was replaced by a voiceover translation in Ukrainian. The show added takes of contestants empowering and inspiring people through music as well as in memory of the soldiers at the frontline.

On 20 November, Maria Kvitka was named the winner by the public, marking Oleksandra Zaritska & Andriy Matsola's first win as coaches. This is also the first and only time an artist on the "Second Chance" team won the competition.

== Teams ==
Color key

- Winner
- Runner-up
- Third place
- Eliminated in the Live finale
- Moved to another team
- Eliminated in the Knockouts
- Saved to compete in the "Second Chance"
- Stolen in the Battles
- Eliminated in the Battles
- Eliminated in the "Second Chance" auditions

Coaches	Top 80 Artists				
Svyatoslav Vakarchuk					
Svyatoslav Vakarchuk	~~Aliye Khadzhabadinova~~ (Note: Aliye Khadzhabadinova, Dimash Dauletov, Mykhaylo Tsar, and Anna Kindzersʹka had to be moved into the teams of Dorofeeva, Olya, Second Chance, and Potap, respectively, since Svyatoslav Vakarchuk did not return for the finale live show.)	~~Dimash Dauletov~~	~~Mykhaylo Tsar~~	~~Anna Kindzersʹka~~	Maksym Borodin
Svyatoslav Vakarchuk	Roman Melish & Dmytro Tsymbal (Note: With the permission of the producers, Vakarchuk decided that both Melish and Tsymbal were tied as winners of their battle and they turned into a duo for the knockouts.)		Darʹya Zabelina	~~Liya Meladze~~	~~Pavlo Tyutyunnyk~~
Svyatoslav Vakarchuk	~~Guli Guli~~	~~Tina Kolodiy~~	2tone	Vasyl' Palyukh	Kateryna Kulyna
Svyatoslav Vakarchuk	Iryna Benʹko	Kateryna Kovalenko			
Dorofeeva					
Dorofeeva	Oleksandr Sviridenko	Davyd Maskysa	Olena Chukalenko	Aliye Khadzhabadinova	Nataliya Buryk
Dorofeeva	Oksana Pozyvay	Nataliya Mykolayenko	Oleksandr Oleshchuk	Mariya Sur	~~Inesa Hrytsayenko~~
Dorofeeva	~~Valentyn Skrypnyk~~	~~Liya Meladze~~	~~Dmytro Rotʹkin~~	~~Volodymyr Porubaylo~~	Anastasiya Posna
Dorofeeva	Yevheniya Tananayeva	Narek Amiryan	Yevhen Bichasnyy		
Potap					
Potap	Karyna Stolaba	Pavlo Nazhyha	Yaroslav Kayda	Mykhaylo Herasymchuk	Anna Kindzers'ka
Potap	Mariya Maksymova	~~Yana Milevsʹka~~	Valentyn Skrypnyk	Yernazar Zhuban	Ostap Drivko
Potap	~~Yuliya Shtolya~~	Alina Lavrova	Nazar Ilʹchyshen	Oleksandr Korzhov	Diana Matviychuk
Potap	Marʹyan Romanchuk	Andriy Hryhorsʹkyy	Ihor Olʹkhovyy	Veronika Slyuzalek	
Olya Polyakova					
Olya Polyakova	Mariya Kvitka	Serhiy Solovyov	Dimash Daulyetov	Hlib Parkhomenko	Marta Lypchey
Olya Polyakova	Valeriya Buturlina	Yuliya Voytko	Viktor Kyrylov	Yaroslav Havyanetsʹ	~~Petro Chornyy~~
Olya Polyakova	~~Olena Chukalenko~~	Ella Vvedensʹka	Anastasiya Palamarʹ	Klim Kulikov	Olʹha & Hanna V.
Olya Polyakova	Sabina Safarli	Viktoriya Litvinchuk	Yevhen T.-Ponomarenko	Oleksandr Desyatnikov	
Oleksandra & Andriy (Second Chance)					
Oleksandra & Andriy (Second Chance)	Petro Chornyy	Yana Milevsʹka	Marta Lyubchyk	Volodymyr Porubaylo	Mykhaylo Tsar
Oleksandra & Andriy (Second Chance)	Pavlo Tyutyunnyk	Liya Meladze	Marko Shvaykovsʹkyy	Inesa Hrytsayenko	Spiv Brativ
Oleksandra & Andriy (Second Chance)	Elizaveta Ovramenko	Oleksandr Bykov	Yuliya Shtolya	Tina Kolodiy	Dmytro Rotʹkin
Oleksandra & Andriy (Second Chance)	Guli Guli	Kateryna Ofliyan	Gera Gerc	Anastasiya & Mikola H.	Karyna Avvakumova
Oleksandra & Andriy (Second Chance)	Alysa Fynashkyna	Aluchana Fedzhy	GG HulyayHorod	Kateryna Bilous	Modoom
Oleksandra & Andriy (Second Chance)	Mykhaylo Nikolaenko				
Note: In the battles, each coach could save one eliminated artist, either from another team (italicized names) or from their own (underlined name).

== Blind auditions ==
In the blind auditions (vybir naoslip in Ukrainian), each coach should complete their team with a total amount of 16 artists, except Oleksandra & Andriy, who are to choose 14 artists to compete in the "Second Chance".

Blind auditions color key
✔	Coach pressed the "I WANT YOU" button
	Artist defaulted to this coach's team
	Artist elected this coach's team
	Artist was selected to compete in the "Second Chance"
	Artist was eliminated

=== Episode 1 (23 January) ===
First episode results
Order	Artist	Age	Song	Coach's and artist's choices				
Order	Artist	Age	Song	Svyatoslav	Dorofeeva	Potap	Olya	Oleksandra & Andriy
1	Olena Chukalenko	24	"Vilna"	✔	✔	✔	✔	N/A
2	Aliye Khadzhabadinova	31	"Bagcalarda kestane"	✔	–	✔	–	N/A
3	Mykhaylo Nikolaenko	21	"Divchyna z inshoho zhyttia"	–	–	–	–	✔
4	Marta Lypchey	30	"T.N.T."	–	–	–	✔	N/A
5	Valentyn Skrypnyk	18	"Zori"	–	✔	✔	✔	N/A
6	Yaroslav Havyanetsʹ	29	"Tebe tse mozhe vbyty"	–	–	–	✔	N/A
7	Mariya Sur	17	"Survivor"	–	✔	✔	✔	N/A
8	Yaryna Solonenko	21	"Fortepiano"	–	–	–	–	–
9	Pavlo Nazhyha	26	"Leila"	–	✔	✔	✔	N/A
10	GG HulyayHorod	—	"Vesnianka"	–	–	–	–	✔
11	Anna Kindzersʹka	31	"Love Tonight"	✔	✔	✔	✔	N/A

=== Episode 2 (30 January) ===
Second episode results
Order	Artist	Age	Song	Coach's and artist's choices				
Order	Artist	Age	Song	Svyatoslav	Dorofeeva	Potap	Olya	Oleksandra & Andriy
1	Oleksandr Sviridenko	20	"O Mamo"	–	✔	–	✔	N/A
2	Yevhen Bichasnyy	26	"Stayin' Alive"	–	✔	✔	✔	N/A
3	Iryna Peregrym	27	"Show Me Your Love"	–	–	–	–	–
4	Roman Melish	32	"Vedro con mio diletto"	✔	–	✔	–	N/A
5	Inessa Hrytsayenko	22	"Husy"	✘	✔	✔	✔	N/A
6	Modoom	—	"Chervona Ruta"	–	–	–	–	✔
7	Dmytro Rotʹkin	35	"Johnny B. Goode"	✔	✔	–	✔	N/A
8	Oleksandr Desyatnikov	25	"Bez Tebe Mene Nema"	–	–	–	✔	N/A
9	Roman Lyutiy	50	"Zori zapalaly"	–	–	–	–	–
10	Yuliya Voytko	20	"It's a Man's Man's Man's World"	–	✔	✔	✔	N/A
11	Elizaveta Ovramenko	16	"Dezhaviu"	–	–	–	–	✔
12	Maksym Borodin	36	"Priatki"	✔	–	✔	✔	N/A

=== Episode 3 (6 February) ===
Third episode results
Order	Artist	Age	Song	Coach's and artist's choices				
Order	Artist	Age	Song	Svyatoslav	Dorofeeva	Potap	Olya	Oleksandra & Andriy
1	Alina Lavrova	30	"Rampampam"	–	✔	✔	✔	N/A
2	Natalia Alexandrova	62	"Teche voda"	–	–	–	–	–
3	Nataliya Mykolayenko	22	"Vosem"	✔	✔	✔	✔	N/A
4	Kateryna Bilous	29	"I Will Always Love You"	–	–	–	–	✔
5	Vasylʹ Palyukh	22	"O sole mio"	✔	–	–	–	N/A
6	Diana Bernat	22	"2 dni"	–	–	–	–	–
7	Diana Matviychuk	16	"Tam, Kudi Ya Ydu"	–	–	✔	–	N/A
8	Olʹha & Hanna Voytsekhovsʹki	—	"Dva persteni"	–	✔	–	✔	N/A
9	Spiv Brativ	—	"I'll Be There For You"	–	–	–	–	✔
10	Klim Kulikov	33	"I Need a Dollar"	–	–	–	✔	N/A
11	Mykhaylo Tsar	21	"All of Me"	✔	–	–	–	N/A
12	Yuliya Shtolya	28	"When We're High"	✔	✔	✔	✔	N/A
13	Liya Meladze	17	"Hallelujah"	✔	✔	✔	✔	N/A

=== Episode 4 (13 February) ===
Fourth episode results
Order	Artist	Age	Song	Coach's and artist's choices				
Order	Artist	Age	Song	Svyatoslav	Dorofeeva	Potap	Olya	Oleksandra & Andriy
1	Aluchana Fedzhy	18	"Miata"	–	–	–	–	✔
2	Volodymyr Porubaylo	26	"Eye of the Tiger"	–	✔	–	✔	N/A
3	Guli Guli	—	"Blinding Lights"	✔	–	–	–	N/A
4	Marʹyan Romanchuk	27	"Let Her Go"	–	–	✔	✔	N/A
5	Anastasiya Posna	17	"Pochemu"	–	✔	–	–	N/A
6	Yernazar Zhuban	25	"Take My Breath"	–	–	✔	–	N/A
7	Hlib Parkhomenko	19	"I Wanna Be Your Slave"	✔	✔	–	✔	N/A
8	Darʹya Zabelina	22	"Tvoi grixy"	✔	✔	✔	–	N/A
9	Taras Poliakh	24	"Slyshkom Vliublёn"	–	–	–	–	–
10	Ostap Drivko	26	"Love Is Around Us"	–	–	✔	✔	N/A
11	Viktoriya Litvinchuk	23	"It's a Sin"	–	✔	–	✔	N/A
12	Anastasiia Palamarʹ	17	"Lovely"	–	✔	–	✔	N/A
13	Dimash Daulyetov	27	"I Have Nothing"	✔	✔	✔	✘	N/A
14	Alysa Fynashkyna	33	"Pokazhy mnie liubov"	–	–	–	–	✔

=== Episode 5 (20 February) ===
Fifth episode results
Order	Artist	Age	Song	Coach's and artist's choices				
Order	Artist	Age	Song	Svyatoslav	Dorofeeva	Potap	Olya	Oleksandra & Andriy
1	Oleksandr Oleshchuk	22	"Hallelujah"	–	✔	–	✔	N/A
2	Dmytro Tsymbal	42	"Luna Tu"	✔	–	–	✔	N/A
3	Laura Uteutova	33	"Pochemy"	–	–	–	–	–
4	Pavlo Tyutyunnyk	25	"Mynaie den, mynaie nich"	✔	✔	✔	–	N/A
5	Narek Amiryan	27	"Nessun dorma"	✔	✔	✔	✔	N/A
6	Ihor Ol'khovyy	20	"Beggin'"	–	–	✔	–	N/A
7	Iryna Barylyuk	25	"Nestrymna techiya"	–	–	–	–	–
8	Andriy Hryhorsʹkyy	20	"Ty dochekaisia mene"	–	–	✔	–	N/A
9	Anastasiia & Mykola Hetman	—	"Obiimy"	–	–	–	–	✔
10	Iryna Ben'ko	39	"Melodiya"	✔	–	–	–	N/A
11	Yevheniya Tananayeva	23	"Маma"	✔	✔	–	✔	N/A
12	Nazar Il'chyshen	26	"Save Your Tears"	✔	✔	✔	✔	N/A
13	Karyna Avvakumova	26	"Amerikano"	–	–	–	–	✔
14	Valeriia Buturlina	23	"All by Myself"	✔	✔	✔	✔	N/A

=== Episode 6 (9 October) ===
Sixth episode results
Order	Artist	Age	Song	Coach's and artist's choices				
Order	Artist	Age	Song	Svyatoslav	Dorofeeva	Potap	Olya	Oleksandra & Andriy
1	Viktor Kyrylov	24	"Ni obitsyanok, ni probachen'"	–	–	–	✔	N/A
2	Serhiy Stetsiy	37	"Movchaty"	–	–	–	–	–
3	Oksana Pozyvay	26	"Falling"	–	✔	✔	–	N/A
4	Mykhaylo Herasymchuk	26	"JOMO"	–	–	✔	–	N/A
5	Nataliya Buryk	23	"Shum"	–	✔	✔	✔	N/A
6	Gera Gerc	30	"Vysokomirni"	–	–	–	–	✔
7	Kateryna Kulyna	28	"Hrushechka"	✔	–	✔	–	N/A
8	Oleksandr Zakharov	33	"Myt"	–	–	–	–	–
9	Yana Milevsʹka	23	"when the party's over"	✔	✔	✔	✔	N/A
10	Oleksandr Korzhov	21	"Ptychka"	–	–	✔	–	N/A
11	Davyd Maskysa	23	"Too Close"	✔	✔	✔	✔	N/A
12	Veronika Slyuzalek	26	"Dodomu"	✔	Team full	✔	✔	N/A
13	Mariya Maksymova	16	"Alive"	✔	Team full	✔	✔	N/A
14	Tina Kolodiy	22	"Mozol'"	✔	Team full	✔	✔	N/A
15	2tone	—	"Soldat"	✔	Team full	–	✔	N/A
16	Kateryna Ofliyan	32	"Naity svoykh"	–	Team full	–	–	✔

=== Special episode (2 October) ===
This episode was recorded after the 2022 Russian invasion of Ukraine with contents of the coaches and contestants sending their best wishes to their motherland and regards to the soldiers at the frontline. It also included stories of how they kept empowering and inspiring people through music.

The special episode was broadcast on 2 October, marking the show's return after eight months of suspension. However, TET replaced 1+1 as the new channel broadcasting the remaining episodes of the show.

=== Episode 7 (16 October) ===
Seventh episode results
Order	Artist	Age	Song	Coach's and artist's choices				
Order	Artist	Age	Song	Svyatoslav	Dorofeeva	Potap	Olya	Oleksandra & Andriy
1	Marta Lyubchyk	31	"Oy day Boh"	–	Team full	–	–	✔
2	Oleksandr Bykov	31	"Ptaha"	–	Team full	–	–	✔
3	Sabina Safarli	36	"I Don't Want to Miss a Thing"	–	Team full	–	✔	N/A
4	Mariya Kvitka	29	"Oy letiv syzyy holubochok"	✔	Team full	–	✔	N/A
5	Ella Vvedensʹka	52	"Simply the Best"	–	Team full	–	✔	N/A
6	Yevhen Teslenko-Ponomarenko	—	"La donna è mobile"	✔	Team full	✔	✔	N/A
7	Yaroslav Kayda	28	"Mein Herz brennt"	✔	Team full	✔	Team full	N/A
8	Marko Shvaykovsʹkyy	20	"Papaoutai"	–	✔	✔	–	✔
9	Serhiy Solovyov	26	"Hray, muzyko, moya"	–	–	✔	✔	N/A
10	Karyna Stolaba	17	"What's Up"	✔	✘	✔	✔	N/A
11	Yuliya Kurchenkova	32	"All the Man That I Need"	–	–	–	–	–
12	Kateryna Kovalenko	28	"The Hills"	✔	–	–	–	N/A

== Battles ==
In the battles (boi in Ukrainian), the four coaches pair their contestants to sing a song together, and only one of them advances to the knockouts. The non-stop steal format of the seventh season of the Dutch version of The Voice was implemented in this round. That means artists who end up seated in the 'save room' at the end of the round advance to the next stage. Also, each coach has the chance to save one losing artist from their own team and many of another coach's team.

The "Second Chance" duo coach, Oleksandra & Andriy, saved five artists at the end of the round.

Battles color key
Artist won the battle and advanced to the knockouts
Artist lost the battle but was saved and advanced to the knockouts
Artist lost the battle but was chosen to compete in the "Second Chance"
Artist lost the battle and was saved, but was then eliminated after being switched with another artist
Artist lost the battle and was eliminated

=== Episode 8 (23 October) ===
Eighth episode results
Order	Coach	Winner	Song	Loser(s)	'Save' results				
Order	Coach	Winner	Song	Loser(s)	Svyatoslav	Dorofeeva	Potap	Olya	Oleksandra & Andriy
1	Dorofeeva	Mariya Sur	"Say Something"	Anastasiya Posna	–	–	✔	–	–
2	Potap	Pavlo Nazhyha	"Tebe nemaye cʹohodni"	Veronika Slyuzalek	✔	–	–	✔	–
3	Dorofeeva	Oleksandr Sviridenko	"Superstition"	Yevhen Bichasnyy	–	–	–	✔	–
4	Svyatoslav	Darʹya Zabelina	"Tsvite teren"	Kateryna Kulyna	✔	–	–	–	–
5	Olya	Hlib Parkhomenko	"Ta4to"	Oleksandr Desyatnikov	–	✔	–	–	–
6	Potap	Yernazar Zhuban	"Stolen Dance"	Ihor Olʹkhovyy	–	–	–	–	–
7	Dorofeeva	Inessa Hrytsayenko	"Bad Guy"	Dmytro Rotʹkin	–	–	–	–	✔
8	Olya	Yuliya Voytko	"Titanium"	Yevhen Teslenko-Ponomarenko	–	–	–	–	–
9	Svyatoslav	Pavlo Tyutyunnyk	"Shallow"	Kateryna Kovalenko	N/A	–	–	–	–
10	Potap	Yana Milevsʹka	"Ptashechka"	Andriy Hryhorsʹkyy	–	–	–	–	–
11	Svyatoslav	Aliye Khadzhabadinova	"Bitanga/Pintea/Bosorkanya"	Guli Guli	N/A	–	–	–	✔
12	Olya	Serhiy Solovyov	"Chortopolokh"	Sabina Safarli	–	–	–	–	–
12	Olya	Serhiy Solovyov	"Chortopolokh"	Viktoriya Litvinchuk	–	–	–	–	–
13	Potap	Mariya Maksymova	"Firework"	Diana Matviychuk	–	–	–	✔	–
14	Olya	Valeriya Buturlina	"Kray"/"Beggin'"	Olʹha & Hanna Voytsekhovsʹki	–	–	–	–	–
15	Svyatoslav	Anna Kindzersʹka	"Fallin'"	Tina Kolodiy	~~✔~~ (Note: Svyatoslav wanted to save Kolodiy, but he could only save one artist from his team to advance, which he had already done previously (saved Kateryna Kulyna). Although, Kolodiy was later saved by Oleksandra and Andriy for the Second Chance team.)	–	–	–	✔
16	Dorofeeva	Nataliya Buryk	Not broadcast (Note: This performance was not broadcast due to the song being from a Russian artist.)	Yevheniya Tananayeva	–	✔	–	–	–

=== Episode 9 (30 October) ===
Ninth episode results
Order	Coach	Winner	Song	Loser(s)	'Save' results				
Order	Coach	Winner	Song	Loser(s)	Svyatoslav	Dorofeeva	Potap	Olya	Oleksandra & Andriy
1	Svyatoslav	Maksym Borodin	"Ne moya"	Iryna Benʹko	N/A	–	–	–	–
2	Olya	Marta Lypchey	Not broadcast	Klim Kulikov	–	–	–	–	–
3	Dorofeeva	Oksana Pozyvay	"Easy On Me"	Liya Meladze	✔	N/A	–	✔	–
4	Potap	Yaroslav Kayda	"Ain't No Sunshine"	Oleksandr Korzhov	–	✔	–	–	–
5	Dorofeeva	Nataliya Mykolayenko	"Bruises"	Valentyn Skrypnyk	–	N/A	✔	–	–
6	Potap	Ostap Drivko	"Dark Side"	Marʹyan Romanchuk	–	–	–	–	–
7	Svyatoslav	Dimash Daulyetov	"Le Temps des Cathédrales"	Vasylʹ Palyukh	N/A	–	–	–	–
8	Olya	Viktor Kyrylov	"Shaleniy"	Anastasiya Palamarʹ	–	–	–	–	–
9	Potap	Mykhaylo Herasymchuk	"I Gotta Feeling"	Yuliya Shtolya	–	–	–	–	✔
10	Dorofeeva	Davyd Maskysa	"Taka yak ty"	Narek Amiryan	–	N/A	–	–	–
11	Svyatoslav	Mykhaylo Tsar	"Say Something"	2tone	N/A	–	–	–	–
12	Olya	Mariya Kvitka	"Oy, u vyshnevomu sadu"	Yaroslav Havyanetsʹ	–	–	–	✔	–
13	Svyatoslav	Dmytro Tsymbal	"Stoitʹ hora vysokaya"	N/A	N/A	–	–	–	–
13	Svyatoslav	Roman Melish	"Stoitʹ hora vysokaya"	N/A	N/A	–	–	–	–
14	Olya	Petro Chornyy	"Chom ty ne pryyshov"	Olena Chukalenko	–	✔	–	N/A	–
14	Olya	Petro Chornyy	"Chom ty ne pryyshov"	Ella Vvedensʹka	–	–	–	N/A	–
15	Dorofeeva	Oleksandr Oleshchuk	"Zhuravli"	Volodymyr Porubaylo	–	N/A	–	–	✔
16	Potap	Karyna Stolaba	"Moye kokhannya"	Nazar Ilʹchyshen	–	–	–	–	–
16	Potap	Karyna Stolaba	"Moye kokhannya"	Alina Lavrova	–	–	–	–	–

== Knockouts ==
For the knockouts (nokauty in Ukrainian), all teams have nine artists each and each coach has four seats for the artists they want to move through to the live show to sit down. Usually, the first four artists to perform (a song of their choice) sit in one of those seats. Then, the fate of the following artists will be decided based on whether their coach would like to switch out a seated artist to favor them. After all the artists have performed, those four who end up seated will advance to the live finale. In addition, coaches' advisors help them on deciding who advances to the next round; the advisors were Fahot for Team Svyatoslav, season 11 contestant Kola for Team Dorofeeva, Michelle Andrade for Team Potap, and Artem Pyvovarov for Team Olya.

At the end of the round, Oleksandra & Andriy saved four artists to compete in the "Second Chance". Also, after the knockouts have ended, the public was able to vote for one artist to join Team Oleksandra & Andriy for the live finale. Pavlo Tyutyunnyk from Team Svyatoslav received the most votes and joined the duo coach's team.

Knockouts color key
Artist won the knockout and advanced to the live show
Artist lost the knockout but was chosen to compete in the "Second Chance"
Artist initially won the knockout but was then eliminated after being switched with another artist
Artist lost the knockout and was immediately eliminated

=== Episode 10 (6 November) ===
Tenth episode results
Coach	Order	Artist	Song	Artist switched	Final results	
Coach	Order	Artist	Song	Artist switched	Team results	Second Chance 'save'
Dorofeeva	1	Oleksandr Oleshchuk	"8-y kolir"	—N/a	Eliminated	—
Dorofeeva	2	Mariya Sur	"Show Me How You Burlesque"	—N/a	Eliminated	—
Dorofeeva	3	Nataliya Mykolayenko	"Sasha"	—N/a	Eliminated	—
Dorofeeva	4	Oleksandr Sviridenko	"Shkidlyva zvychka"	—N/a	Eliminated (Note: The artist was supposed to be eliminated in the Knockouts, but was returned by the creators in the live finale due to 2022 Russian invasion of Ukraine.)	—
Dorofeeva	5	Oksana Pozyvay	"Montero (Call Me by Your Name)"	Oleksandr Oleshchuk	Advanced	N/A
Dorofeeva	6	Olena Chukalenko	"Rolling In The Deep"	Oleksandr Sviridenko	Advanced	N/A
Dorofeeva	7	Inessa Hrytsayenko	Not broadcast	Mariya Sur	—	✔
Dorofeeva	8	Nataliya Buryk	"Somebody to Love"	Nataliya Mykolayenko	Advanced	N/A
Dorofeeva	9	Davyd Maskysa	"Led tronulsya"	Inessa Hrytsayenko	Advanced	N/A
Svyatoslav	1	Aliye Khadzhabadinova	"Vershe miy, vershe"	—N/a	Advanced	N/A
Svyatoslav	2	Maksym Borodin	"Supergirl"	—N/a	Eliminated	—
Svyatoslav	3	Mykhaylo Tsar	"Zlyva"	—N/a	Advanced	N/A
Svyatoslav	4	Pavlo Tyutyunnyk	"Angels"	—N/a	Eliminated	✔ (Note: Tyutyunnyk was selected by the public vote to be part of the "Second Chance" team for the live finale.)
Svyatoslav	5	Dmytro Tsymbal & Roman Melish	"Raz tsvite lyubov"	None	Eliminated	—
Svyatoslav	6	Liya Meladze	"Un-Break My Heart"	None	—	✔
Svyatoslav	7	Darʹya Zabelina	"Now We Are Free"	None	Eliminated	—
Svyatoslav	8	Anna Kindzersʹka	"Dumy Moi"	Pavlo Tyutyunnyk	Advanced	N/A
Svyatoslav	9	Dimash Daulyetov	"Namalyuyu tobi zori"	Maksym Borodin	Advanced	N/A

=== Episode 11 (13 November) ===
Eleventh episode results
Coach	Order	Artist	Song	Artist switched	Final results	
Coach	Order	Artist	Song	Artist switched	Team results	Second Chance 'save'
Potap	1	Pavlo Nazhyha	"Trymay mene"	—N/a	Advanced	N/A
Potap	2	Valentyn Skrypnyk	"Misyatsʹ po nebu khodytʹ"	—N/a	Eliminated	—
Potap	3	Yaroslav Kayda	"She's Gone"	—N/a	Advanced	N/A
Potap	4	Yana Milevsʹka	"Love Again"	—N/a	—	✔
Potap	5	Ostap Drivko	"Trouble"	Valentyn Skrypnyk	Eliminated	—
Potap	6	Mykhaylo Herasymchuk	"Stay"	Ostap Drivko	Advanced	N/A
Potap	7	Yernazar Zhuban	"1944"	None	Eliminated	—
Potap	8	Mariya Maksymova	"Lose You to Love Me"	Yana Milevsʹka	Advanced	N/A
Potap	9	Karyna Stolaba	"Oy, na hori"	None	Eliminated	—
Olya	1	Yaroslav Havyanetsʹ	"Hutsulka Ksenya"	—N/a	Eliminated	—
Olya	2	Marta Lypchey	"Popuri"	—N/a	Advanced	N/A
Olya	3	Valeriya Buturlina	"All for Us"	—N/a	Advanced	N/A
Olya	4	Mariya Kvitka	"Zombie"	—N/a	Eliminated	—
Olya	5	Serhiy Solovyov	"You"	Yaroslav Havyanetsʹ	Advanced	N/A
Olya	6	Yuliya Voytko	"Ya tvoya"	None	Eliminated	—
Olya	7	Viktor Kyrylov	"Sorry Seems to Be the Hardest Word"	None	Eliminated	—
Olya	8	Hlib Parkhomenko	"Stop"	Mariya Kvitka	Advanced	N/A
Olya	9	Petro Chornyy	"The Phantom of the Opera"	None	—	✔

== Second Chance ==
For this season, it was added a brand new phase of competition called "Другий шанс" (in Ukrainian Druhyy shans, meaning "Second Chance") that was exclusive to the show's official YouTube channel. After failing to go through to the next rounds, artists had the chance to be selected by duo coach, Andriy Matsola and Oleksandra Zaritska, to become a member of their team.

"Second Chance" color key
Artist advanced to the next round
Artist was initially chosen to advance but was eliminated later
Artist was (immediately) eliminated
Artist withdrew

=== Auditions ===
The first phase was part of the main show's blind auditions segment and, throughout its seven episodes, Oleksandra & Andriy chose 14 artists that failed to turn a chair.

In each YouTube episode, two artists performed for the duo coach and, as episodes passed, some artists that were previously selected to go further ended up eliminated, as seen in the details table below. Out of them all, only two artists advanced to the next round.

"Second Chance" auditions results
Episode (digital)	Coaches	Audition 1		Audition 2		Audition 3	
Episode (digital)	Coaches	Artist	Song	Artist	Song	Artist	Song
Episode 1 (20 January)	Oleksandra & Andriy	GG HulyayHorod (Note: Eliminated in episode 3.)	"Vesnianka"	Mykhaylo Nikolaenko (Note: Eliminated in episode 2.)	"Divchyna z inshoho zhyttia"	N/A	
Episode 2 (27 January)	Oleksandra & Andriy	Elizaveta Ovramenko	"Dezhaviu"	Modoom	"Chervona Ruta"	N/A	
Episode 3 (3 February)	Oleksandra & Andriy	Spiv Brativ	"I'll Be There for You"	Kateryna Bilous	"I Will Always Love You"	N/A	
Episode 4 (10 February)	Oleksandra & Andriy	Aluchana Fedzhy	"Miata"	Alysa Fynashkyna	"Pokazhy mnie liubov"	N/A	
Episode 5 (17 February)	Oleksandra & Andriy	Karyna Avvakumova	"Amerikano"	Anastasiya & Mikola Hetʹman	"Obiimy"	N/A	
Episode 6 (6 October)	Oleksandra & Andriy	Gera Gerc (Note: With the permission of the producers, Gera Gerc decided to take Matsola's place as a coach for two episodes, while Matsola and Kateryna Ofliyan were tied as producers of the Second Chance team.)	"Vysokomirni"	Kateryna Ofliyan	"Naity svoykh"	N/A	
Episode 7 (13 October)	Oleksandra & Gera	Marko Shvaykovsʹkyy	"Papaoutai"	Marta Lyubchyk	"Oy day Boh"	Oleksandr Bykov	"Ptaha"

=== Battles ===
In the second round (which was part of the main show's battles segment), the duo coach had to create two battles per episode, and after all episodes, only two artists go through to the knockouts.

In YouTube episode 8, the winners of the auditions (Elizaveta Ovramenko, Spiv Brativ, Marta Lyubchyk, Oleksandr Bykov, and Marko Shvaykovsʹkyy) come back to battle against three artists (Guli Guli, Dmytro Rotʹkin, and Tina Kolodiy) that Oleksandra & Andriy saved from the main competition's episode 8. Then, in YouTube episode 9, the winners from episode 8 return and battle against another two artists saved from the main battles (Volodymyr Porubaylo and Yuliya Shtolya).

"Second Chance" battles results
Episode (YouTube)	Coaches	Order	Winner	Song	Loser(s)
Episode 8 (20 October)	Oleksandra & Gera	1	Spiv Brativ	"Nese Halya vodu"	Guli Guli
Episode 8 (20 October)	Oleksandra & Gera	2	Marta Lyubchyk	"Zitti e buoni"	Dmytro Rotʹkin
Episode 8 (20 October)	Oleksandra & Gera	3	Marko Shvaykovsʹkyy	"Faith"	Tina Kolodiy
Episode 8 (20 October)	Oleksandra & Gera	4	Elizaveta Ovramenko	"Shape of You"	N/A
Episode 8 (20 October)	Oleksandra & Gera	4	Oleksandr Bykov	"Shape of You"	N/A
Episode 9 (27 October)	Oleksandra & Andriy	1	Marta Lyubchyk	"Believer"	Yuliya Shtolya
Episode 9 (27 October)	Oleksandra & Andriy	2	Volodymyr Porubaylo	"Nothing Else Matters"	Oleksandr Bykov
Episode 9 (27 October)	Oleksandra & Andriy	3	Marko Shvaykovsʹkyy	"Bohemian Rhapsody"	Spiv Brativ
Episode 9 (27 October)	Oleksandra & Andriy	3	Marko Shvaykovsʹkyy	"Bohemian Rhapsody"	Elizaveta Ovramenko

=== Knockouts ===
For the first episode of the knockouts, the winners from the battles and the two contestants saved on the tenth episode of the main knockouts round (Liya Meladze and Inessa Hrytsayenko) sing one song each, and three of them move through to the second part. However, there was a twist: all the contestants actually moved through to the second part. Inessa Hrytsayenko said that she wants to stop participating in the competition.

For the second episode, the winners of the previous episode and the two contestants saved on the eleventh episode of the main knockouts round (Yana Milevsʹka and Petro Chornyy) sing one song each, and three of them would move through to the live show.

Finally, after the knockouts had ended, the public was able to vote for one artist eliminated throughout the whole competition to join Team Oleksandra & Andriy for the live finale. Pavlo Tyutyunnyk from Team Svyatoslav received the most votes and joined the duo coach's team.

"Second Chance" knockouts results
Episode (YouTube)	Coaches	Order	Artist	Song
Episode 10 (3 November)	Oleksandra & Andriy	1	Marko Shvaykovsʹkyy	"Song 2"
Episode 10 (3 November)	Oleksandra & Andriy	2	Volodymyr Porubaylo	"Balada pro malʹvy"
Episode 10 (3 November)	Oleksandra & Andriy	3	Liya Meladze	"Vyshni"
Episode 10 (3 November)	Oleksandra & Andriy	4	Marta Lyubchyk	"Talking to the Moon"
Episode 10 (3 November)	Oleksandra & Andriy	5	Inessa Hrytsayenko	"Say My Name"
Episode 11 (10 November)	Oleksandra & Andriy	1	Yana Milevsʹka	"Cold Heart"
Episode 11 (10 November)	Oleksandra & Andriy	2	Marko Shvaykovsʹkyy	"Druh"
Episode 11 (10 November)	Oleksandra & Andriy	3	Volodymyr Porubaylo	"Dancing On My Own"
Episode 11 (10 November)	Oleksandra & Andriy	4	Liya Meladze	"7 Rings"
Episode 11 (10 November)	Oleksandra & Andriy	5	Petro Chornyy	"Pisnya pro pisnyu"
Episode 11 (10 November)	Oleksandra & Andriy	6	Marta Lyubchyk	"Young and Beautiful"

== Live show ==
For the live show, the "Second Chance" Team Oleksandra & Andriy joined as a main team.

On this season, there was only one live episode: the finale. For this phase, coach Svyatoslav Vakarchuk did not return to mentor his team members, Aliye Khadzhabadinova, Dimash Dauletov, Mykhaylo Tsar, and Anna Kindzersʹka. Hence, these artists were moved into the other coaches' teams: Khadzhabadinova to Team Dorofeeva, Dauletov to Team Olya, Tsar to Team Second Chance, and Kindzersʹka to Team Potap. Moreover, Petro Chornyy has returned to Team Second Chance. To secure this, producers have returned Oleksandr Sviridenko to Team Dorofeeva, Karyna Stolaba to Team Potap, and Mariya Kvitka to Team Olya. This means that all coaches had six artists on their teams.

The show was divided into two rounds. In the first round, all artists performed and one, per team, advanced to the superfinal via the public vote. In round two, the public voted for who they wanted to win the competition.

Live show color key
Artist advanced to the second round
Artist was eliminated

=== Episode 12 – Finale (20 November) ===
Finale results
Round	Coach	Order	Artist	Song	Result
Round one	Dorofeeva	1	Oleksandr Sviridenko	"Sokolyata" (Соколята)	Public's vote
Round one	Dorofeeva	2	Aliye Khadzhabadinova	"‍Ya pidu v daleki hory" (Я піду в далекі гори)	Eliminated
Round one	Dorofeeva	3	Oksana Pozyvay	"Ne zalyshay" (Не залишай)	Eliminated
Round one	Dorofeeva	4	Olena Chukalenko	"Cheremshyna" (Черемшина)	Eliminated
Round one	Dorofeeva	5	Nataliya Buryk	"Vorohiv na nozhi" (Ворогів на ножі)	Eliminated
Round one	Dorofeeva	6	Davyd Maskysa	"Chuty himn" (Чути гімн)	Eliminated
Round one	Potap	7	Mariya Maksymova	"Stefania" (Стефанія)	Eliminated
Round one	Potap	8	Anna Kindzersʹka	"Ya zhyva" (Я жива)	Eliminated
Round one	Potap	9	Mykhaylo Gerasimchuk	"Shche osinʹ zovsim moloda" (Ще осінь зовсім молода)	Eliminated
Round one	Potap	10	Yaroslav Kayda	"Hora" (Гора)	Eliminated
Round one	Potap	11	Pavlo Nazhyha	"2step"	Eliminated
Round one	Potap	12	Karyna Stolaba	"Oy, letily dyki husy" (Ой, летіли діки гуси)	Public's vote
Round one	Oleksandra & Andriy	13	Marta Lyubchyk	"Choven" (Човен)	Eliminated
Round one	Oleksandra & Andriy	14	Petro Chornyy	"Materynsʹka lyubov" (Материнська любов)	Public's vote
Round one	Oleksandra & Andriy	15	Yana Milevsʹka	"Dochekayusʹ" (Дочекаюсь)	Eliminated
Round one	Oleksandra & Andriy	16	Volodymyr Porubailo	"Nihto krim nas" (Ніхто крім нас)	Eliminated
Round one	Oleksandra & Andriy	17	Pavlo Tyutyunnyk	"Insha lyubov" (Інша любов)	Eliminated
Round one	Oleksandra & Andriy	18	Mykhaylo Tsar	"Dyakuyu za svitanky" (Дякую за світанки)	Eliminated
Round one	Olya	19	Dimash Daulyetov	"We Are the World"	Eliminated
Round one	Olya	20	Mariya Kvitka	"Ptah" (Птах)	Public's vote
Round one	Olya	21	Hlib Parkhomenko	"Tam, de nas nema" (Там, де нас нема)	Eliminated
Round one	Olya	22	Valeriya Buturlina	"Ukraina – tse ty" (Україна – це ти)	Eliminated
Round one	Olya	23	Marta Lypchey	"Kholodno" (Холодно)	Eliminated
Round one	Olya	24	Serhiy Solovyov	"Ya viryu" (Я вірю)	Eliminated
Round two	Potap	1	Karyna Stolaba	"Movchunam" (Мовчунам)	Runner-up
Round two	Dorofeeva	2	Oleksandr Sviridenko	"Vesna" (Весна)	Runner-up
Round two	Olya	3	Mariya Kvitka	"Reve ta stohne" (Реве та стогне)	Runner-up
Round two	Oleksandra & Andriy	4	Petro Chornyy	"Batʹko Dnipo" (Батько Дніпро)	Winner
