= Prudius =

Prudius is a surname. It may refer to:

- Anastasiia Olehivna Prudius better known as Kola (singer), Ukrainian singer
- Oleg Prudius (born 1979), Ukrainian professional wrestler
- Vladyslav Prudius, retired Ukrainian professional footballer
