= 2017 Ukrainian Super Cup =

2017 Super Cup – Fokstrot
Shakhtar Donetsk	Dynamo Kyiv
2	0
- Date: 15 July 2017
- Venue: Chornomorets Stadium, Odesa
- Referee: Kostiantyn Trukhanov (Kharkiv)
- Attendance: 34,146

The 2017 Ukrainian Super Cup became the 14th edition of Ukrainian Super Cup, an annual season opener football match contested by the winners of the previous season's Ukrainian Top League and Ukrainian Cup competitions.

The match was played at the Chornomorets Stadium, Odesa, on 15 July 2017 and contested by league and cup winner Shakhtar Donetsk and league and cup runner-up Dynamo Kyiv.

== Preparations and other background events ==
On 13 July 2017 Volodymyr Heninson pointed out to the fact that since 1998 UEFA Super Cup takes place in Monaco (Note: referring to Stade Louis II which was a home to UEFA Super Cup in 1998-2012) which is also a port city and, thus, the "Ukrainian Premier League moves in the stream of the European traditions". As an additional argument why Odesa was chosen as the Ukrainian Super Cup place, the President of UPL stated that football was brought to the Russian Empire through Odesa by the British sailors.

For the first time there will be used the 360-degree video technology for broadcasting of game by channels "Futbol 1" / "Futbol 2" with help of "Limelight, 360discoVR". The game will be broadcast on the "Ukrayina" television channel as well. The game will be commented by Andriy Malynovskyi, while among the studio guests there will be Oleksandr Holovko and Vyacheslav Shevchuk. At the mid-game show will feature cheerleaders competition and concert of Ukrainian singer Yarmak. On 14–15 July 2017 there are planned number of mass events by Ukrainian Premier League among which will be a 2.5 km (1.6 mi) running race "Probih UPL" that will take place in the morning of the game day.

Originally appointed referee Anatoliy Zhabchenko was replaced by Kostiantyn Trukhanov on a personal request.

== Previous encounters ==
Before this game both teams met in the Ukrainian Super Cup nine times, the first being back in 2004. Before this game out of the previous nine Shakhtar won 2 games and Dynamo won 2, five more games were tied and led to penalty shootout three of which were won by Dynamo and two were won by Shakhtar.

== Match ==
=== Details ===
15 July 2017
21:00 EEST

Shakhtar Donetsk	2 – 0	Dynamo Kyiv
Facundo Ferreyra 8', 56'	Report

Chornomorets Stadium, Odesa
Attendance: 34,146
Referee: Kostiantyn Trukhanov (Kharkiv)

Shakhtar Donetsk	Dynamo Kyiv

GK	30	(Ukraine) Andriy Pyatov
DF	33	(Croatia) Dario Srna (c)
DF	4	(Ukraine) Serhiy Kryvtsov
DF	44	(Ukraine) Yaroslav Rakitskyi
DF	31	(Brazil) Ismaily
MF	17	(Ukraine) Maksym Malyshev	(substituted off) 46'
MF	10	(Brazil) Bernard		(yellow card) 31'
MF	11	(Brazil) Marlos
MF	7	(Brazil) Taison	(substituted off) 77'
MF	6	(Ukraine) Taras Stepanenko		(yellow card) 28' (yellow-red card) 80'
CF	19	(Argentina) Facundo Ferreyra	(substituted off) 87'
Substitutes:
GK	26	(Ukraine) Mykyta Shevchenko
DF	2	(Ukraine) Bohdan Butko
DF	18	(Ukraine) Ivan Ordets	(substituted on) 87'
MF	74	(Ukraine) Viktor Kovalenko	(substituted on) 46'
MF	21	(Brazil) Alan Patrick
MF	9	(Brazil) Dentinho	(substituted on) 77'
CF	99	(Argentina) Gustavo Leschuk
Manager:
(Portugal) Paulo Fonseca

GK	72	(Ukraine) Artur Rudko
DF	5	(Portugal) Vitorino Antunes
DF	24	(Croatia) Domagoj Vida
DF	34	(Ukraine) Yevhen Khacheridi
MF	9	(Ukraine) Mykola Morozyuk
MF	15	(Ukraine) Viktor Tsyhankov	(substituted off) 68'
MF	16	(Ukraine) Serhiy Sydorchuk		(yellow card) 90+2'
MF	19	(Ukraine) Denys Harmash	(substituted off) 61'
MF	29	(Ukraine) Vitaliy Buyalskyi	(substituted off) 79'	(yellow card) 45'
CF	10	(Ukraine) Andriy Yarmolenko (c)
CF	70	(Democratic Republic of the Congo) Dieumerci Mbokani
Substitutes:
GK	35	(Ukraine) Maksym Koval
MF	8	(Ukraine) Volodymyr Shepelyev	(substituted on) 79'
MF	18	(Belarus) Mikita Korzun
MF	20	(Ukraine) Oleh Husyev
MF	25	(Paraguay) Derlis González	(substituted on) 68'
CF	41	(Ukraine) Artem Besyedin	(substituted on) 61'
DF	44	(Hungary) Tamás Kádár
Manager:
(Belarus) Aliaksandr Khatskevich

Assistant referees:

Oleksandr Voityuk (Zaporizhia)
Serhiy Bekker (Kharkiv)

Fourth and reserve officials:

Anatoliy Abdula (Kharkiv)
Oleh Pluzhnyk (Kharkiv)

Referee supervision:

Volodymyr Petrov (Kharkiv)

Match rules

- 90 minutes of regulation.
- No extra time of regulation if score is level.
- Penalty shoot-out if scores still level.
- Seven named substitutes, of which up to three may be used.
- No more than 9 foreign players on a field at one time for each team.

=== Statistics ===
First half
Statistic	Dynamo Kyiv	Shakhtar Donetsk
Goals scored		
Total shots		
Shots on target		
Saves		
Ball possession		
Corner kicks		
Fouls committed		
Offsides		
Yellow cards		
Red cards		

Overall
Statistic	Dynamo Kyiv	Shakhtar Donetsk
Goals scored	0	2
Total shots	9	10
Shots on target	4	6
Saves	4	4
Ball possession	51%	49%
Corner kicks		
Fouls committed	17	20
Offsides	5	1
Yellow cards	2	3
Red cards		
