= Holos Krainy season 14 =

Holos Krainy
- Season 14
- Hosted by: Yuriy Horbunov; Kateryna Osadcha
- Coaches: Artem Pyvovarov; Tina Karol; Natalia Mohylevska; Monatik
- No. of contestants: 48

Release
- Original network: 1+1 Ukraine
- Original release: 25 October 2026

Season chronology
- ← Previous; Season 13

The 14th season of the Ukrainian reality talent show Holos Krainy premiered on 25 October 2026, broadcasting every Sunday at 9:00 p.m. on 1+1 Ukraine. From the previous season, only Artem Pyvovarov returned for his second season as coach, alongside two returning coaches: Tina Karol and Monatik, who came back, respectively, for their tenth and fourth seasons. Also, Natalia Mohylevska made her debut in this version of the show, after serving as a coach in the third season of the kids version. Hosts of the season are Yuriy Horbunov and Kateryna Osadcha, who both came back from the previous season for their tenth and twelth season, respectively, as host.

== Teams ==
Color key

- Winner
- Runner-up
- Third place
- Eliminated in the Live finale
- Eliminated in the Knockouts
- Stolen in the Battles
- Eliminated in the Battles

Coaches	Top 48 Artists					
Artem Pyvovarov						
Artem Pyvovarov	Maria Antoniuk-Barnak	Anatoliy Riabinyan	Kira Chernychko	Veronika Oran	Olena Ukrainets	Maksim Karchyshyn
Artem Pyvovarov	Yaroslava Oleshko	Katerina "Karmin" Soroka	David Stepanyan			
Tina Karol						
Tina Karol	Zoriana Haichuk	Zhenya Arya	Karel Zinovy	Serhiy Tiahneriadnov	Dimitro Vasiliev	Anastasia Bugaenko
Tina Karol	Sabina Matviiv	Anna Tkachenko	Artem Yurievich Tkachenko	Mykola Kharkovets	Tetyana Levchenko	Stas Konovalov
Natalia Mohylevska						
Natalia Mohylevska	Oksana Pidopryhora	Olena Svitlytska	Artem Nikitin	Arina Lyvtenchuk	Vasil Lohai	Daria Hazhyi
Natalia Mohylevska	Andriy Khmara	Victoria Georgian	SPIV BRATIV			
Monatik						
Monatik	Mariam Kazarian	Kira Lyskova	Daryna & Yulia Chavchuk	Anya Klimenko	Illia Rzhyshchev	Karina Varadi
Monatik	Alona Khramtsova	Denis "Shtomber" Rodin	Danylo Solovyov	Valeria Vovk	Anna Koss	

== Blind auditions ==
Each coach needs to recruit 12 artists in their teams.

Blind auditions color key
✔	Coach pressed the "I WANT YOU" button
✔	Coach pressed the "I WANT YOU" button despite having their team full
	Artist defaulted to this coach's team
	Artist elected this coach's team
	Artist was eliminated since no coach pressed their button

=== Episode 1 (25 October) ===
Among this episode's auditionees were Karach Zinovy, who previously successfully auditioned in eight season of the show before being eliminated during the Battles, and Maria Antoniuk-Barnak, who previously unsuccessfully auditioned on the third season of the Kids version of the show.

First episode results
Order	Artist	Age	Song	Coach's and artist's choices			
Order	Artist	Age	Song	Artem	Tina	Natalia	Monatik
1	Zoriana Haichuk	29	"Running Up That Hill"	—	✔	✔	✔
2	Mariam Kazarian	26	"Вимолив"	✔	✔	✔	✔
3	Zhenya Arya	26	"Bailamos"	—	✔	✔	✔
4	Olena Humenna	29	"Не П'яна – Закохана"	—	—	—	—
5	Zinovy Karach	41	"Троянди на пероні"	—	✔	—	✔
6	Maria Antoniuk-Barnak	17	"Вибір"	✔	—	—	—
7	Anatoliy Riabinyan	33	"Sunday Morning"	✔	✔	✔	✔
8	Kira Lyskova	19	"Запали вогонь"	—	—	—	✔
9	Vlad Siliznov	24	"Афини"	—	—	—	—
10	Oksana Pidopryhora	32	"Can't Help Falling in Love"	—	—	✔	✔
11	Olena Svitlytska	34	"Самотня боса"	—	—	✔	—
12	Serhiy Tiahneriadnov	45	"Nessun dorma"	✔	✔	✔	✔

=== Episode 2 (1 November) ===
Among this episode's auditionees were Anya Klimenko, daughter of Oleksander Klimenko (winner of the seventh season of the show), who previously unsuccessfully auditioned on the fourth season of the Kids version of the show, and Dimitro Vozniuk, who is married to Olena Lutsenko, winner of the eighth season of the show.

Second episode results
Order	Artist	Age	Song	Coach's and artist's choices			
Order	Artist	Age	Song	Artem	Tina	Natalia	Monatik
1	Artem Nikitin	31	"Ти поселилась у душі" (original music)	—	—	✔	✔
2	Daryna & Yulia Chavchuk	23, 21	"Спогади"	—	—	—	✔
3	Maria Wichmann	32	"Stayin' Alive"	—	—	—	—
4	Anya Klimenko	17	"One Day"	✔	✔	✔	✔
5	Illia Rzhyshchev	28	"Старі фотографії"	—	—	✔	✔
6	Dimitro Vasiliev	54	"Knockin' On Heaven's Door"	—	✔	—	✔
7	Arina Lyvtenchuk	34	"Пиріжок"	—	—	✔	—
8	Olga Melnychuk	24	"Де ти тепер?"	—	—	—	—
9	Karina Varadi	22	"Мед"	✔	✔	✔	✔
10	Kira Chernychko	20	"Fallin'"	✔	—	—	—
11	Dimitro Vozniuk	34	"Шовковиця"	—	—	—	—
12	Alona Khramtsova	37	"2 дні"	✔	—	—	✔
13	Anastasia Bugaenko	25	"Калуські вечорниці"	—	✔	—	—
14	Vasil Lohai	48	"Feel"	✔	—	✔	✔

=== Episode 3 (8 November) ===
Among this episode's auditionees was Denis Rodin, who previously competed on the third season of the Kids version of the show on team Potap, and who is a current member of Kalush under the stage name "Shtomber"

Sixth episode results
Order	Artist	Age	Song	Coach's and artist's choices			
Order	Artist	Age	Song	Artem	Tina	Natalia	Monatik
1	Veronika Oran	39	"I Was Made for Lovin' You"	✔	—	✔	—
2	Daria Hazhyi	26	"Шиншила"	—	—	✔	—
3	Dimitro Nazarik	22	"The World We Knew (Over and Over)"	—	—	—	—
4	Olena Ukrainets	40	"Ти мені не даєш"	✔	✔	✔	—
5	Sabina Matviiv	18	"Castle in the Snow"	—	✔	—	—
6	Maksim Karchyshyn	19	"Коко Шанель"	✔	✔	✔	✔
7	Maria Rosokha	38	"Шкода"	—	—	—	—
8	Andriy Khmara	39	"Грай, музико моя"	—	—	✔	—
9	Yaroslava Oleshko	27	"Earth Song"	✔	—	✔	✔
10	Anna Tkachenko	40	"Знаєш, як болить"	—	✔	—	—
11	Yevhen Voitovych	20	"Jailhouse Rock"	—	—	—	—
12	Denis "Shtomber" Rodin	21	"Дежавю"	—	—	—	✔
13	Katerina "Karmin" Soroka	24	"Японія"	✔	—	✔	✔

=== Episode 4 (15 November) ===
Among this episode's auditionees were Danylo Solovyov, younger brother of Serhiy Solovyov (finalist of the twelth season of the show), and SPIV BRATIV, a band who previously unsuccessfully auditioned in season 12.

Fourth episode results
Order	Artist	Age	Song	Coach's and artist's choices			
Order	Artist	Age	Song	Artem	Tina	Natalia	Monatik
1	Artem Yurievich Tkachenko	35	"Пінаколада"	—	✔	✔	✔
2	Victoria Georgian	33	"That Man"	—	—	✔	—
3	Monica Rafaelyan	24	"Шаленій"	—	—	—	—
4	Mykola Kharkovets	21	"Твої гріхи"	—	✔	—	✔
5	Danylo Solovyov	25	"Чому"	—	—	—	✔
6	Valeria Vovk	27	"Ти з любови собі не жартуй"	—	—	—	✔
7	Sofia & Anastasia Morozovi	17	"Ой там на горі"	—	—	—	—
8	David Stepanyan	21	"I Wanna Dance With Somebody"	✔	✔	✔	✔
9	Tetyana Levchenko	33	"Вотсап"	—	✔	—	—
10	Stas Konovalov	37	"Always"	—	✔	—	—
11	Aliona Yakymenko	27	"Черемшина"	—	Team full	—	—
12	SPIV BRATIV	—	"Канареєчка"	—	Team full	✔	—
13	Anna Koss	34	"If I Ain't Got You"	✔	Team full	✔	✔
