= Bilia topoli =

Ukrainian war song

Song

Bilia topoli (Ukrainian: Біля тополі, lit. 'By the poplar') is a Ukrainian song created in the context of the Russo-Ukrainian War. More specifically, the song is dedicated to fallen Ukrainian soldiers on the battlefield.

== Creation ==
The song is created by Piotr "Lolek" Sołoducha, a Polish musician.

In 2015, together with the Polish band Enej, Ukrainian musicians Taras Chubay and Ivan Lenyo, the leader of the band Kozak System took part in the recording of the song.

== Covers ==
The song was covered by Kristonko, Shumei and Yaktak and others.
