= Skofka =

Ukrainian rap artist

- Born: Volodymyr Volodymyrovych Samoliuk; 21 February 1994 (age 32); Rivne, Ukraine
- Other name: Skofka
- Citizenship: Ukrainian
- Occupation: Singer
- Years active: 2020–present
- Musical career
- Instrument: Vocals

Volodymyr Volodymyrovych Samoliuk (Ukrainian: Володимир Володимирович Самолюк, born 21 February 1994), better known as his stage name Skofka (stylized in all caps) is a Ukrainian rap artist.

== Biography ==
Born in Rivne and grew up at the nearby town of Zdolbuniv, where he decided to become a rapper. His police officer father did not immediately approve of his son's hobby.

In 2011, he graduated from Zdolbuniv Secondary School No. 6, and in 2011–2016 he studied at the Rivne Institute of Slavic Studies of Kyiv Slavonic University, majoring in Commodity Research and Commercial Business.

== Music career ==
In January 2021, together with the leader of the Kalush band Oleh Psiuk, they presented their joint track "Otaman". In May, they released their joint song "Dodomu", which hit the YouTube trends, top charts on Shazam, Spotify, and iTunes.

In July, Kalush and Skofka released a joint EP "Yo-Yo" and a new track "Ne napriahaisia" (Don't Stress).

In the fall of 2021, the singer Kola presented the song "Ba", released in collaboration with Skofka.

At the same time, Skofka became an artist of the ENKO label (Alyona Alyona, Kalush).

In 2022, the rapper Skofka released the songs "Ne zabudem i ne probachym" (Don't forget and don't forgive) and "Chuty himn" (Hear the anthem). The latter of these works was dedicated to his friend Valentyn Konovodov, who died defending Ukraine from Russian invaders.

== Discography ==
=== Singles ===
- "Sarf i Shapka" / «Шарф і Шапка» (2017)
- "Balalaika" / «Балалайка» (2020)
- "A ia b..." / «А я б..» (2020)
- "Het, za zabor" / «Геть, за забор» (2020)[16]
- "Viter v holovi" / «Вітер в голові» (2020)
- "Tut tilky tak" / «Тут тільки так» (2020)
- "Buh dihi bai" / «Бум дігі бай» (2020)
- "Sirnyk" / «Сірник» (2020)
- "Kruzak" / «Крузак» (2021)
- "Fort Buaiar" / «Форт Буаяр» (2021)
- "Nam by" / «Нам би» (2021)
- "Bereza stara" / «Береза стара» (2021)[17]
- "Ne byi sobaku" / «Не бий собаку» (2021)[18]
- "Po barabanu" / «По барабану» (2021)[19]
- "V dorohu" / «В дорогу» (2022)
- "Oi na oi" / «Ой на ой» (2022)
- "Ne zabudem i ne probachym" / «Не забудем і не пробачим» (2022)
- "Chuty himn" / «Чути гімн» (2022)
- "Zaglox" / «Заглох» (2023)

=== Collaborations ===
==== Kalush feat. Skofka ====
- «Otaman» (2020)
- "Dodomu" / «Додому» (2021)
- "Davai nachystotu" / «Давай начистоту» (2021)
- "Ne napriahai" / «Не напрягайся» (2021)
- "Faina" / «Файна» (2021)
- "Maiakom" / «Маяком» (2021)
- "Ya idu" / «Я йду» (2021)
- "Batkivshchyna" / «Батьківщина» (2022)

==== Skofka & БетБіт ====
- "Ya b pominiav" / Я б поміняв (2020)
- "Chuvachi" / Чувачі (2021)

==== Юрчік, Вовк, Skofka ====
- "Bo ia reper" / Бо я репер (2020)

==== Skofka & Дімич ====
- "Ne buksui" / Не буксуй (2015)

== Awards ==
Year	Subject	Category	Awards	Result	Ref
		Collaboration of the year (with Kalush)	Rap.ua	Nominated	
2023	Chuty himn	Song of unbreakable Ukraine	YUNA	Won	
