= Yaktak =

Ukrainian singer

- Born: Yaroslav Mykolaiovych Karpuk; 4 May 2005 (age 21); Stara Vyzhivka, Volyn Oblast, Ukraine
- Citizenship: Ukrainian
- Occupation: Singer
- Years active: 2022–present
- Musical career
- Instrument: Vocals

Yaroslav Mykolaiovych Karpuk (Ukrainian: Ярослав Миколайович Карпук; born 4 May 2005), known professionally as Yaktak (stylized in all caps), is a Ukrainian singer and songwriter of pop and hip-hop.

== Biography ==
Karpuk's grandparents nurtured his love for music since childhood. His maternal grandmother teaches at the Stara Vyzhivka Children's Music School, and his grandfather teaches at the Stara Vyzhivka Vocational Lyceum.

Karpuk graduated from the gymnasium in his family's village. He is studying at the Kyiv Municipal Academy of Variety and Circus Arts (specialty "vocalist").

In 2019, Karpuk took part in the 5th season of the Ukrainian television show "Holos.Dity" (team Dzidzio), got to the super final and took 2nd place. In 2020, he won first and second places at the World Championships of Performing Arts (Los Angeles).

Since 2021, he has been writing his own songs and music for them. The same year he won the Grand Prix at the Chornomorski ihry festival.

=== Yaktak project ===
In February 2022, he launched his solo project Yaktak in Kyiv.

He has duet works with Jerry Heil, MamaRika, SOBOL, DOVI, Kola, Golubenko. According to the Weekno website, Yaktak holds high positions in the TOP 10 every week.

He was awarded a prize at the Muzvar Awards 2023.

He was selected as one of the finalists of the Ukrainian preselection for the Eurovision Song Contest 2024 with the song "Lalala". He finished in fourth position.

== Videoclips ==
Year	Title	Director
2022	"Hutsulka Ksenia" / «Гуцулка Ксеня»	Andrii Sobolevskyi
2022	"Povistka" / «Повістка»	Andrii Sobolevskyi
2022	"Stwfaniia" / «Стефанія»	Andrii Sobolevskyi
2022	"Peremozhe dobro" / «Переможе добро»	Andrii Sobolevskyi
2022	"Bilia topoli" / «Біля тополі» (cover)	Andrii Sobolevskyi
2022	"Probach" / «Пробач»	Andrii Sobolevskyi
2022	"Ridna maty" / «Рідна мати»	Andrii Sobolevskyi
2022	"V pustii kimnati" / «В пустій кімнаті» (with Jerry Heil)	Gosha Kosmo
2022	"Batku" / «Батьку»	Andrii Sobolevskyi»
2022	"Narechena" / «Наречена»	Andrii Sobolevskyi
2022	"Vrodlyva" / «Вродлива»	Andrii Sobolevskyi
2022	"Pohliad" / «Погляд» (with SOBOL)	Andrii Sobolevskyi
2022	"Ne movchu" / «Не мовчи»	Volodymyr Servetnyk
2022	"V kozhnii rodyni" / «В кожній родині»	Volodymyr Servetnyk
2022	"Chekaie vdoma" / «Чекає вдома» (with DOVI)	Leonid Lavtseniuk
2023	"Ne zabuvai" / «Не забувай»	Volodymyr Servetnyk
2023	"Koly bolyt dusha" / «Коли болить душа»	Viktor Volos
2023	"Striliai" / «Стріляй»	Viktor Volos
2023	"Porichka" / «Порічка» (with Kola)	Andrii Sobolevskyi
2023	"Perekotypole" / «Перекотиполе» (with DOVI)	Mariia Dorichenko
2023	"Sylet" / «Силует»	Viktor Volos

== Awards ==
Year	Subject	Category	Awards	Result	Ref
2023	–	Best new names in pop music	Muzvar Awards	Won	
