= Yarmak =

Yarmak (Russian: Ермак) is a surname. Notable people with the surname include:

- Oleksandr Yarmak (born 1991), Ukrainian rapper
- Sergey Yarmak (born 1976), Russian hero of WWII
- Alex Yarmak (born 1995), Ukrainian musician
- Helen Yarmak (born 1949), Russian fashion designer

== See also ==
- Yarmak, Çat, village in Turkey
