= Dorofeeva =

Ukrainian singer (born 1990)

Dorofeeva Надія Дорофєєва
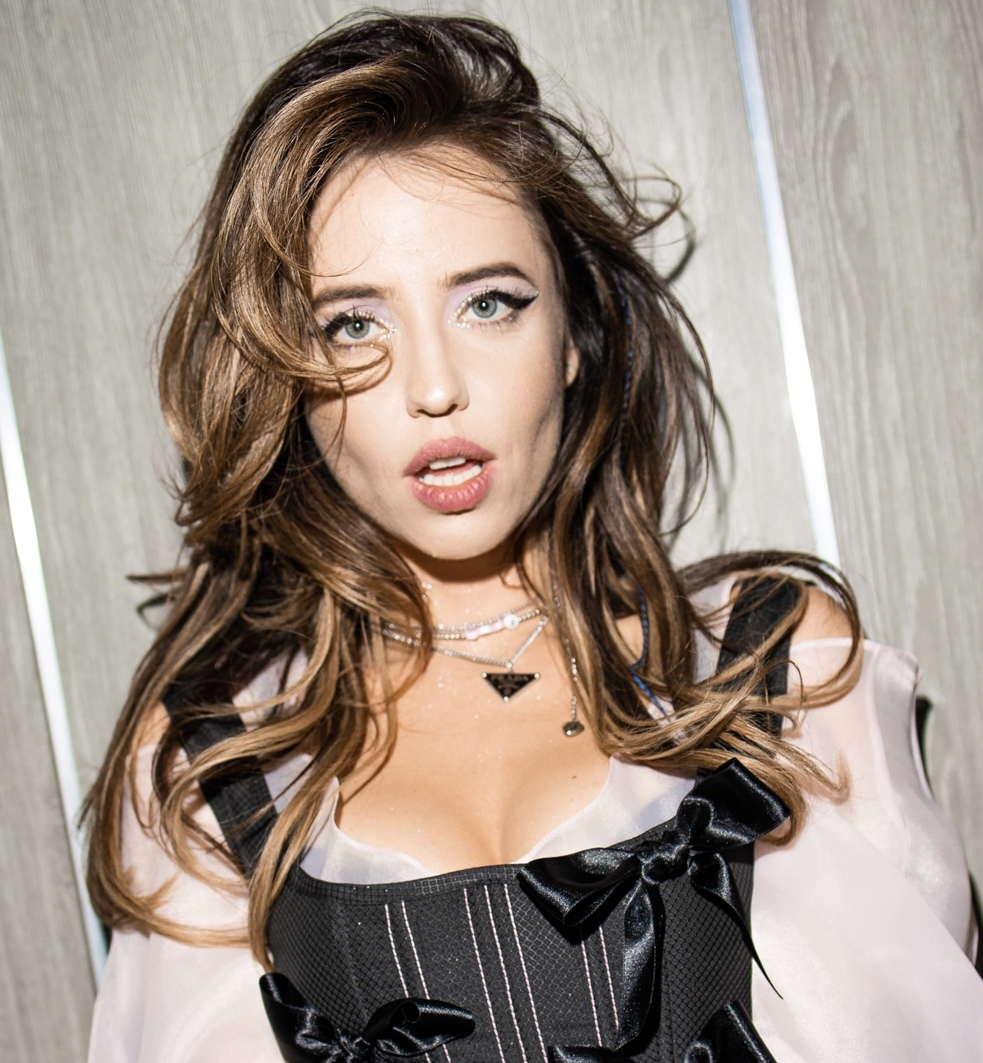
- Dorofeeva in 2021

Background information
- Also known as: DoDo
- Born: Nadiia Volodymyrivna Dorofieieva; 21 April 1990 (age 36); Simferopol, Ukrainian SSR, Soviet Union
- Origin: Ukraine
- Genres: Pop, dance pop, electropop, R&B
- Occupations: Singer; actress
- Years active: 2005–present
- Labels: Mozgi Entertainment, Pomitni
- Website: mozgient.com/dorofeeva

Nadiia Volodymyrivna Dorofieieva (Ukrainian: Надія Володимирівна Дорофєєва; born 21 April 1990), professionally known as DOROFEEVA, is a Ukrainian pop singer, actress and a former member of the pop duo Vremya i Steklo, which was created and produced by Potap.

== Early life and education ==
Nadiia Dorofieieva was born on 21 April 1990 in Simferopol, Ukraine. From a young age, Dorofieieva was engaged in music and dancing. In 2002, at the age of 12, Dorofieieva became regional champion in ballroom dancing, being crowned the prize of best ballroom dancer in her native Crimea.

In 2005, after finishing the ninth class, Dorofieieva moved to Moscow, where she started studying at the Moscow State Art and Cultural University for a degree in singing.

== Career ==
=== 2002–2009: Early career ===
Dorofieieva first rose to prominence as a participant in several Ukrainian and foreign music competitions. In 2004, she won the first prize in the "middle category" of the Black Sea Games children's singing competition in Skadovsk. In 2005, she participated in the Ukrainian television show Chance, a spin-off of Karaoke on the Maidan.

While living in Moscow, between 2005 and 2007, Dorofieieva was part of the girl group МЧС. With the group, Dorofieieva recorded an album and also performed on Russian federal television, including a performance of the song "Monetka" on Cabaret of 100 stars on NTV in 2007.

At the age of 17, Dorofieieva signed up in another spin-off of Karaoke on the Maidan, titled American Chance. Dorofieieva was selected as one of the twelve participants of the show and traveled to Los Angeles in late 2007 to continue the selection process. There, she ended up as one of the five selected singers in the girl band Glam. Glam was acquired by David Junk, who previously acquired and promoted t.A.T.u. and Smash!! in the English-speaking world, to become a Ukrainian analogue to the Spice Girls. However, during the 2008 financial crisis, the project was dropped and Dorofieieva was told to find a new job. Glam recorded one promotional song "Thirsty", which was uploaded on YouTube in 2008, but never commercially released.

After her American dream fell apart, Dorofieieva developed her own solo project, which was called Markiza, in which she took a similar pop rock style to Avril Lavigne. In 2008, she released a solo album under that name.

=== 2010–2020: Vremya i Steklo ===
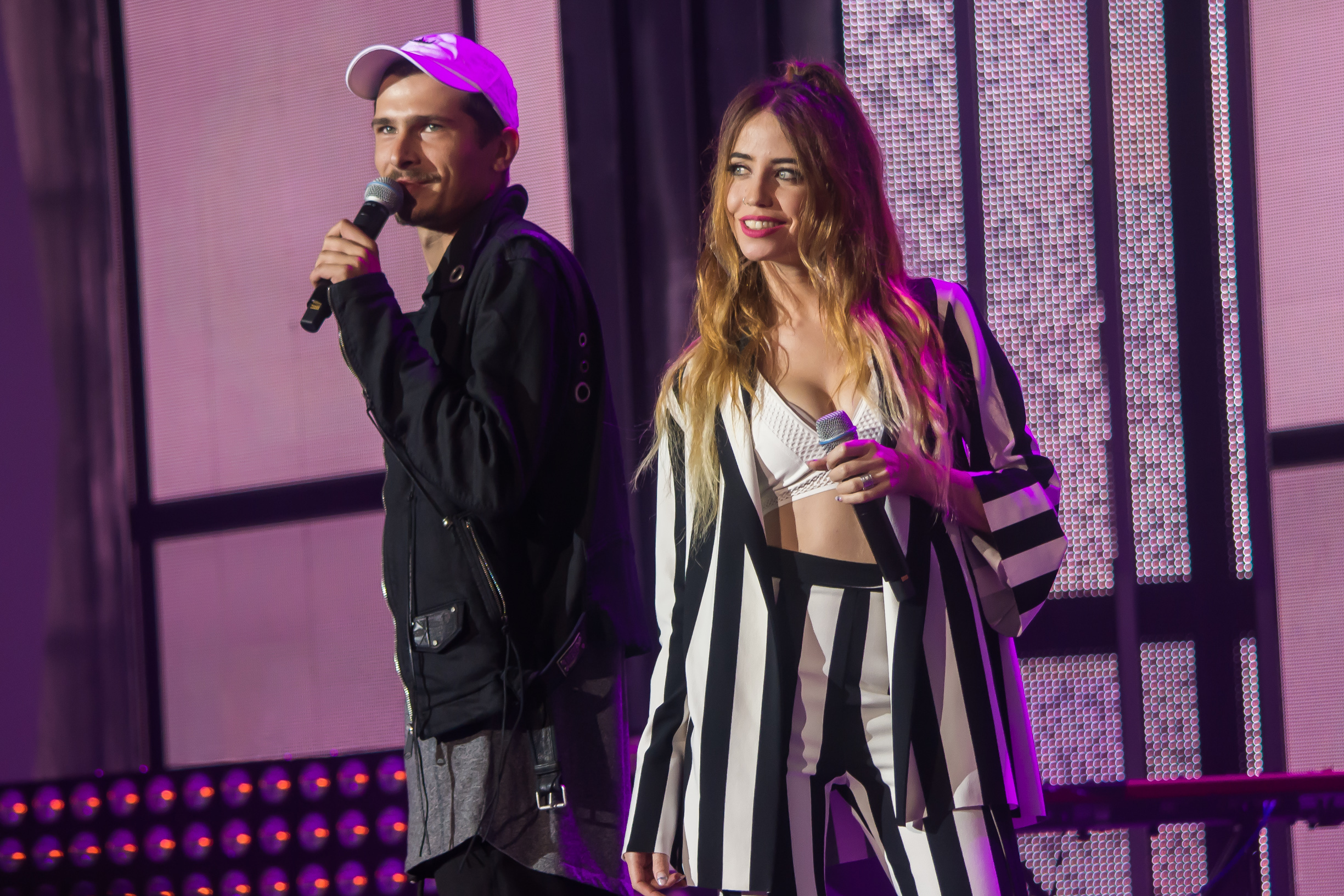
Vremya i Steklo performing in 2016 in Vitebsk.

Dorofieieva passed the internet casting to become the female soloist in the duo Vremya i Steklo, alongside rapper Oleksii Zavhorodnii. The duo was produced by Potap. With this, Dorofieieva moved back to Kyiv. In December 2010, the duo released their first single, which only acquired mild commercial success in their native Ukraine. In the subsequent years, Dorofieieva toured Ukraine with Vremya i Steklo alongside Potap & Nastya.

The group enjoyed their breakthrough in 2015 with the single "Imya 505", which gave the duo their final breakthrough in Russia. The song became a viral sensation and quickly became the most-watched Russian-language song ever on YouTube. Their music videos on YouTube later became a source for their popularity.

As a result of the group's rise of fame, Dorofieieva became a popular influencer. In 2016, she started her own clothing line. A year later, she started vlogging on her YouTube channel DoDo Vlog, quickly becoming one of the most-subscribed to channels in Ukraine. In 2018, Dorofieieva and her colleague Zavhorodnii voiced the heroes of Ukrainian animation film, "The Stolen Princess".

In autumn 2017, she took part in a Ukrainian version of the show "Tantsi z zirkamy" (Dancing with the stars) on 1+1. After "Tantsi z zirkamy", she became a coach (together with her colleague Positiff, part of Vremya i Steklo) on "Holos. Dity" (The voice kids) on 1+1.

In 2018, Nadiia became a judge in the Ukrainian TV-show "Liha smikhu" (League of laughter) on 1+1.

=== 2020–present: Solo career ===
In November 2020, Nadiia Dorofieieva announced the start of her solo career after the breakup of the duo "Vremya i Steklo". 20 November, she released her first song as DOROFEEVA, "gorit", which quickly became a hit. In less than a week, the music video has got more than two million views on YouTube.

In the spring of 2021, Dorofeeva released the first EP called "dofamin", including "a tebe", "bam bam" and others.

After the Russian invasion of Ukraine began, she switched to performing in Ukrainian and changed her artistic direction. She participated in the GIDNA project from Future for Ukraine Charity Foundation.

In 2022, with Artem Pyvovarov, she released the song "Dumy", which became a symbol of support for Ukraine. In the same year, she released the album "Sensy".

== Discography ==
=== Studio albums ===
==== Solo ====
===== Studio albums =====
- Markiza (2008)
- Sensy (2022)
- Heartbeat (2024)

===== EP =====
- Dofamin (2021)

==== М.Ч.С. ====
- Seti lyubvi (2007)

=== Singles ===
List of singles as lead artist, with selected chart positions
Title	Year	Peak chart positions						Album or EP
Title	Year	UKR Air.	CIS Air.	LAT Air.	LTU Air.	MDA Air.	RUS Air.	Album or EP
"Abnimos/Dosvidos" (with NK)	2016	—	—	—	—	*	—	Non-album single
"Gluboko..." (with Monatik)	2018	15	26	—	168	174	24	Vislovo
"Gorit"	2020	9	26	41	186	*	34	Dofamin
"Gorit" (DJ Lily Puto Remix)	2021	94	—	—	—	*	—	Non-album single
"A tebe..."	2021	103	—	—	—	*	—	Dofamin
"Pochemu"	2021	23	69	—	165	*	79	Non-album singles
"Nevesta" (with Skryptonite)	2021	—	—	—	—	*	—	Non-album singles
"Ya Tvoya Ne Pervaya"	2021	—	—	—	—	163	—	200 Po Vstrechnoy (tribute album)
"Raznotsvetnaya"	2022	—	—	—	102	161	—	Non-album single
"Dumy" (with Artem Pivovarov)	2022	3	151	—	—	*	—	Sensi
"Riznokolorva"	2022	31	—	—	—	*	—	Sensi
"Krapayut'"	2022	102	—	—	—	*	—	Sensi
"Shchob ne bulo"	2022	13	—	—	9	*	—	Non-album singles
"Shchedryk" (with Lilu45)	2022	—	—	—	—	*	—	Non-album singles
"Votsap"	2023	2	145	—	7	—	—	Non-album singles
"Kokhayu, ale ne zovsim"	2023	9	—	—	—	—	—	Non-album singles
"Ritmi" (with Max Barskih)	2023	61	—	—	—	—	—	Zorepad
"Na samoti"	2023	16	—	—	—	—	—	Non-album singles
"Khay pyshut'"	2023	11	—	—	—	—	—	Non-album singles
"A ya vse plakala" (with Lebiga)	2024	3	127	—	—	—	—	Heartbeat
"Khartbit"	2024	1	115	—	12	—	—	Heartbeat
"Nitrohlitseryn"	2024	192	—	—	—	—	—	Heartbeat
"Murakami"	2025	195	—	—	—	—	—	Pesiki (soundtrack)
"Dodayte svitla"	2025	2	128	—	—	—	—	Non-album singles
"Fenomenal'"	2025	157	—	—	—	—	—	Non-album singles
"Smak-pechal'" (with Positiff)	2025	5	—	—	—	—	—	Non-album singles
"If You Know What I Mean" (with Monatik)	2025	19	—	—	—	—	—	Non-album singles
"Yaponiya"	2025	7	—	—	21	—	—	Non-album singles
"Feel the Heat"	2026	183	—	—	—	—	—	Non-album singles
"747"	2026	14	—	—	—	—	—	Non-album singles
"—" denotes a recording that did not chart or was not released in that territory. "*" denotes the chart did not exist at that time.

=== Promotional singles ===
List of other songs as featured artist
Title	Year	Album or EP
"Pochemu" (New Year's Eve version)	2021	Non-album singles
"Holos krainy" (with Julia Sanina and Artem Pivovarov)	2023	Non-album singles

=== Other charted songs ===
List of other charted songs as lead artist, showing year released, chart positions and album name
Title	Year	Peak chart positions	Album or EP
Title	Year	UKR Air.	Album or EP
"Vecherinka"	2021	118	Dofamin
"U Tvoiy dushi"	2022	131	Sensi
"Okhololo"	2022	139	Sensi
"Spytay u chata dzhypiti"	2024	26	Heartbeat

=== Other featured songs ===
List of other songs as featured artist
Title	Year	Album or EP
"Ne zabiray menya s pati" (Skryptonite featuring Dorofeeva)	2017	Ouroboros: Street 36 / Mirrors

== Rewards ==
Nadiia Dorofeeva received the following awards, titles and distinctions:

- 2002 - Grand Prix of the vocal competition Southern Express.
- 2002 - champion of the Crimea in ballroom dancing.
- 2002 - second prize at the international competition of Bogatikov.
- 2003 - winner of the second prize Sun. Youth. Beauty (Bulgaria).
- 2004 - winner of the first prize of the Ukrainian competition Black Sea Games.
- 2004 - Grand Prix of the Ukrainian competition Star Rain.
- 2004 - member of the jury of the international children's competition Our Land is Ukraine in Artek.
- 2005 - finalist of the TV project Chance.
- 2005 - victory in the Moscow competition Golden Voice.
- 2006 - Grand Prix of Ilya Reznik's contest Little Country.
- 2017 - victory in the nomination Singer of the Year in the Cosmopolitan Awards 2017.
- 2018 - victory in the special nomination Ty prosto cosmos in the Russian music award Zhara Music Awards.
- 2018 - winner of the Ukrainian music award YUNA in the nomination Best Video for a duet song with Dmitry Monatik Hluboko.
