= Artem Pyvovarov =

Ukrainian singer (born 1991)

Artem Pyvovarov Артем Пивоваров
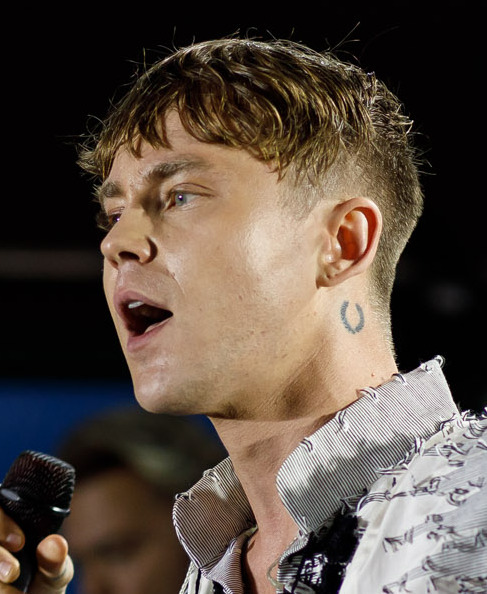
- Pyvovarov performing in 2022

Background information
- Born: 28 June 1991 (age 34); Vovchansk, Kharkiv Oblast, Ukraine
- Genres: Pop; New Wave; Synth-Pop; Dance Pop; Pop Rock; Art Pop
- Occupations: Singer; composer; sound producer
- Years active: 2012–present
- Website: artempivovarov.com

Artem Volodymyrovych Pyvovarov (Ukrainian: Артем Володимирович Пивоваров; born 28 June 1991) is a Ukrainian new wave singer and composer. He has won two YUNA awards: in 2021 for best song and in 2022 the best performer.

== Biography ==
Pyvovarov studied guitar for three months at the age of twelve and began to write songs. He went on to gain a diploma as an obstetrician from Volchansky Medical College, and worked as an assistant anesthesiologist. He also graduated in environmental science at the Kharkiv National Academy of Urban Economy.

His musical career began as a member of the group "Dance! Dance!", and gained popularity on YouTube in 2012 for acoustic songs. Since then, his many recordings have included five albums. From 2015 he has also worked as songwriter, in sound production and as director of a number of short films and visualizations.

In 2022–3 he has performed concerts in Ukraine in support of charities and also to encourage the Ukrainian armed forces. In December 2022, despite a power outage during his concert in Cherkasy following a Russian rocket strike, he continued and finished the concert with the audience singing along with him and waving lights. Ukraine's Ministry of Defense wrote, "The Ukrainian spirit is unbreakable" alongside footage of the concert.

In September 2023, Pyvovarov became a coach on The Voice of Ukraine. On 29 October, Mykhailo Panchyshyn, a contestant on Pyvovarov's team, won the competition.

In December 2024, Pyvovarov performed at an open workout in support for Ukrainian professional boxer Oleksandr Usyk at Riyadh Open Season.

== Discography ==
=== Studio albums ===
Title	Details	Notes
Kosmos (Cosmos)	Released: 1 April 2013; Label: UMIG Music; Format: CD, digital download	Track listing; No. / Title / Length; 1. / "Amerika" (America) / 3:20; 2. / "Do vstrechi" (Until We Meet) / 3:24; 3. / "Lechshe" (Easier) / 4:01; 4. / "Zharkoe leto" (Hot Summer) / 3:19; 5. / "Napishi" (Write) / 3:40; 6. / "Iskat'" (Search) / 3:29; 7. / "Nam ne vernut'" (We Can't Take Back) / 3:53; 8. / "U tebya est' ya, u menya est' ty" (You Have Me, I Have You) / 3:42; 9. / "Resnitsy" (Eyelashes) / 4:17; 10. / "Rodnaya" (Dear) / 5:43; 11. / "Mantra" / 4:58; 12. / "Zachem?" (Why?) (Nervy feat. Artem Pivovarov) / 4:23; 13. / "Stereosistema" (Stereo System) (Cover) / 3:44; Total / / 49:13
Okean (Ocean)	Released: 20 August 2015; Label: UMIG Music; Format: CD, digital download	Track listing; No. / Title / Length; 1. / "Nirvana" / 3:27; 2. / "My molody" (We Are Young) / 3:45; 3. / "Okean" (Ocean) / 4:35; 4. / "Zavisimy" (Dependent) / 3:23; 5. / "Kosmos" (Cosmos) / 3:35; 6. / "Anna" / 3:34; 7. / "Sobiray menya" (Collect Me) / 3:54; 8. / "Podnimi sebya" (Lift Yourself) (feat. SunSay) / 2:16; 9. / "Vydykhay" (Exhale) (feat. SunSay) / 3:26; 10. / "Tsunami" / 5:13; 11. / "Khvylyny" (Minutes) / 3:58; Total / / 39:06
Stikhiya vody (Element of Water)	Released: 10 February 2017; Label: First Music Publishing; Format: CD, digital download	Track listing; No. / Title / Length; 1. / "Kislorod" (Oxygen) / 4:11; 2. / "Na glubine" (At the Depth) / 3:10; 3. / "Meridiany" (Meridians) (feat. Vladi) / 3:45; 4. / "Soyti s uma" (Go Crazy) / 3:38; 5. / "Moya noch'" (My Night) / 3:16; 6. / "Ogon' i ya" (Fire and I) (feat. Kravts & 813) / 3:40; 7. / "Govori" (Speak) / 3:52; 8. / "Stikhiya" (Element) / 3:54; 9. / "Dzhungli" (Jungle) / 3:49; 10. / "Idu" (I Go) / 3:37; Total / / 34:52
Stikhiya ognya (Element of Fire)	Released: 1 December 2017; Label: First Music Publishing; Format: CD, digital download	Track listing; No. / Title / Length; 1. / "Polnolunie" (Full Moon) / 3:33; 2. / "Elastichno" (Elastically) / 3:42; 3. / "Chto ty imela v vidu?" (What Did You Mean?) / 2:16; 4. / "Provintsial'nyy" (Provincial) / 3:40; 5. / "Telo" (Body) / 4:00; 6. / "Miru — mir!" (Peace to the World!) / 3:16; 7. / "Ostavaysya soboy" (Stay Yourself) / 4:14; 8. / "Khaos" (Chaos) (feat. Anacondaz) / 3:32; 9. / "Paranormal" (feat. Fenoman) / 4:11; 10. / "Mono" (feat. Bakey) / 3:10; Total / / 34:14
Zemnoy (Earthly)	Released: 8 November 2019; Label: Best Music; Format: CD, digital download	Track listing; No. / Title / Length; 1. / "No.1" / 3:26; 2. / "Karma" / 4:07; 3. / "Dom" (Home) / 3:23; 4. / "2000" / 3:53; 5. / "Dezhavyu" (Déjà Vu) / 4:04; 6. / "Pozovi" (Call) / 4:04; 7. / "V kazhdom iz nas" (In Each of Us) (feat. Yolka) / 4:46; 8. / "Oazis" (Oasis) / 3:52; 9. / "Mimo menya" (Past Me) / 3:48; 10. / "Moi stikhi, tvoi noty" (My Poems, Your Notes) / 3:53; Total / / 37:16

=== EPs ===
Title
Gorodskie slukhi (feat. Misha Krupin)
(City Rumors) – EP
Details
- Released: 28 April 2017
- Label: Sony Music Entertainment
- Format: Digital download
Notes
- Track listing

No.	Title	Length
1.	"Anna" (feat. Misha Krupin)	3:34
2.	"Dobroe utro" (Good Morning) (feat. Misha Krupin)	3:57
3.	"Odnu" (One) (feat. Misha Krupin)	2:59
4.	"More" (Sea) (feat. Misha Krupin)	3:29
5.	"More" (Sea) (Sorry4 Remix)	3:25
6.	"Anna" (DJ Kiev.Pills Remix)	4:06
Total		20:10

=== Official singles ===
No.	Single	Album	Year
1	"Rodnaya" (Dear)	Kosmos	2013
2	"Lechshe" (Easier)	Kosmos	2014
3	"My molody" (We Are Young)	Okean	2015
4	"Sobiray menya" (Collect Me)	Okean	2015
5	"Zavisimy" (Dependent)	Okean	2015
6	"Stikhiya" (Element)	Stikhiya vody	2016
7	"Na glubine" (At the Depth)	Stikhiya vody	2016
8	"Kislorod" (Oxygen)	Stikhiya vody	2017
9	"Anna" (feat. Misha Krupin)	Gorodskie slukhi – EP	2017
10	"Moya noch'" (My Night)	Stikhiya ognya	2017
11	"Polnolunie" (Full Moon)	Stikhiya ognya	2017
12	"Provintsial'nyy" (Provincial)	Stikhiya ognya	2018
13	"No.1"	Zemnoy	2019
14	"2000"	Zemnoy	2019
15	"Dom" (Home)	Zemnoy	2019
16	"Dezhavyu" (Déjà Vu) / "Pozovi" (Call)	Zemnoy	2020
17	"Randevu" (Rendezvous)	Non-album single	2021
18	"Mirazh" (Mirage)	Non-album single	2021

=== Promotional singles ===
No.	Single	Album	Year
1	"Okean" (Ocean)	Okean	2014
2	"My molody" (We Are Young)	Okean	2015
3	"Sobiray menya" (Collect Me)	Okean	2015
4	"Zavisimy" (Dependent)	Okean	2015
5	"Stikhiya" (Element)	Stikhiya vody	2016
6	"Na glubine" (At the Depth)	Stikhiya vody	2016
7	"Delay svoe delo" (Do Your Thing) (feat. Ne Lyudi)	Non-album single	2016
8	"Kislorod" (Oxygen)	Stikhiya vody	2017
9	"Govori" (Speak)	Stikhiya vody	2017
10	"Moya noch'" (My Night)	Stikhiya ognya	2017
11	"Elastichno" (Elastically)	Stikhiya ognya	2018
12	"Polnolunie" (Full Moon)	Stikhiya ognya	2018
13	"Provintsial'nyy" (Provincial)	Stikhiya ognya	2018
14	"Vidchuy" (Feel)	Non-album single	2018
15	"Mimo menya" (Past Me)	Zemnoy	2018
16	"Karma"	Zemnoy	2018
17	"No.1"	Zemnoy	2019
18	"V kazhdom iz nas" (In Each of Us) (feat. Yolka)	Zemnoy	2019
19	"VidZoriDoZori" (From Dawn to Dawn)	Non-album single	2020
20	"Dom" (Home)	Zemnoy	2020

=== Your Poems, My Notes project ===
No.	Single	Poem	Author	Release
1	"Triolet" (Artem Pivovarov)	"Triolet" (1880)	Ivan Franko	9 March 2021
2	"Miy Ray" (My Paradise) (Artem Pivovarov)	"Miy Ray" (1868)	Mykhailo Starytsky	13 March 2021
3	"Mynayut' dni, mynayut' nochi" (Days Pass, Nights Pass) (Artem Pivovarov feat. Yarmak)	"Mynayut' dni, mynayut' nochi" (1845)	Taras Shevchenko	18 May 2021
4	"Arfamy" (With Harps) (Artem Pivovarov feat. Yevhen Khmara and Pavlo Shylko)	"Arfamy, arfamy…" (1914)	Pavlo Tychyna	24 August 2021
5	"Romans" (Romance) (Artem Pivovarov feat. Oleh Skrypka)	"Romans" (1960)	Mykola Vinhranovsky	17 September 2021
6	"Maybutnist'" (Future) (Artem Pivovarov feat. Kalush)	"Maybutnist'" (1909)	Hryhoriy Chuprynka	4 February 2022
7	"Radisno/Strashno" (Joyful/Scary) (Artem Pivovarov feat. Lilu45)	"Radisno" (Joyful)	Geo Shkurupiy	1 April 2022
8	"Do vesny" (Until Spring) (Artem Pivovarov feat. Zlata Ognevich)	"Do vesny" (Until Spring)	Bohdan-Ihor Antonych	29 April 2022
9	"Dumy" (Thoughts) (Artem Pivovarov feat. DOROFEEVA)	"Dumy moyi, dumy moyi" (My Thoughts, My Thoughts) (1840)	Taras Shevchenko	3 June 2022
10	"Oy Na Hori" (Oh, On the Hill) (Artem Pivovarov)	—	Traditional folk song	8 July 2022
11	"Tishsya" (Rejoice) (Artem Pivovarov feat. Olya Polyakova)	"Tishsya, dytyno, poky shche malen'ka…" (Rejoice, Child, While You Are Still Young…) (1891)	Lesya Ukrainka	26 August 2022
12	"Lyuli-Lyuli" (Artem Pivovarov feat. Alyona Alyona)	"Lyuli-Lyuli"	Panteleimon Kulish	30 September 2022
13	"Oy Na Hori" (Oh, On the Hill) (Acoustic Version) (Artem Pivovarov feat. SHUMEI)	—	Traditional folk song	21 October 2022
14	"Tam U Topoli" (There By the Poplar) (Artem Pivovarov feat. NK)	"Tam topoli u poli na voli" (There Poplars in the Field at Will) (1916) "De topolya roste…" (Where the Poplar Grows…) (1911)	Pavlo Tychyna	11 November 2022
15	"Ochi" (Eyes) (Artem Pivovarov feat. Quest Pistols)	"Hlyan' yiy v ochi!" (Look Into Her Eyes!) (1909)	Hryhoriy Chuprynka	1 May 2023
16	"Lyublyu" (I Love) (Artem Pivovarov feat. Masha Efrosinina)	"Lyublyu" (I Love)	Mykhailo Semenko	25 May 2023
17	"Ty znayesh, shcho ty lyudyna" (You Know That You Are Human) (Artem Pivovarov)	"Ty znayesh, shcho ty lyudyna" (You Know That You Are Human) (1962)	Vasyl Symonenko	13 October 2023
18	"Valtorna" (French Horn) (Artem Pivovarov feat. PIVOVAROV Team The Voice of Ukraine-13)	"Vidmykayu svitanok skrypkovym klyuchem…" (I Unlock the Dawn with a Violin Key…)	Lina Kostenko	17 November 2023
19	"O, Panno!" (Artem Pivovarov & The Vusa feat. Durnev, Levy na Dzhipi, Kutsevalov)	"O, panno Inno" (Oh, Miss Inno) (1915)	Pavlo Tychyna	15 March 2024
20	"Baraban" (Drum) (Artem Pivovarov feat. Klavdia Petrivna)	"Baraban pechali" (Drum of Sorrow)	Geo Shkurupiy	25 April 2024
21	"Nich yaka misyachna" (What a Moonlit Night) (Artem Pivovarov feat. Kola)	"Nich yaka misyachna" (What a Moonlit Night) (1870)	Mykhailo Starytsky	2 October 2024
22	"Tak nikhto ne kokhav" (No One Loved Like This) (Artem Pivovarov feat. Max Barskih)	"Tak nikhto ne kokhav" (No One Loved Like This)	Volodymyr Sosiura	28 November 2024

=== Featuring Artem Pivovarov ===
No.	Single	Album	Year
1	"Zachem?" (Why?) (Nervy feat. Artem Pivovarov)	Kosmos	2013
2	"Vydykhay" (Exhale) (SunSay feat. Artem Pivovarov)	Okean	2015
3	"Mussony" (Monsoons) (Mot feat. Artem Pivovarov)	Naiznanku (Mot's album)	2016
4	"Liven'" (Downpour) (Mot feat. Artem Pivovarov)	Dobraya muzyka klavish (Mot's album)	2017
5	"Magnitnye glaza" (Magnetic Eyes) (Anna Sedokova feat. Artem Pivovarov)	Na vole (Anna Sedokova's album)	2017
6	"Meridiany" (Meridians) (Vladi feat. Artem Pivovarov)	Stikhiya vody	2018
7	"Khaos" (Chaos) (Anacondaz feat. Artem Pivovarov)	Stikhiya ognya	2018
8	"Sokhrani" (Preserve) (Smash feat. Artem Pivovarov)	Viva Amnesia (Smash's album)	2018
9	"V kazhdom iz nas" (In Each of Us) (Yolka feat. Artem Pivovarov)	Zemnoy	2019
10	"Dumy" (Thoughts) (Dorofeeva feat. Artem Pivovarov)	Sensy (Dorofeeva's album)	2022

=== Songs written for other artists ===
No.	Single	Artist	Year
1	"Moya Mayya" (My Maya)	DiO.filmy	2015
2	"Ty mne nuzhen" (You Are Needed)	Regina Todorenko	2015
3	"Ostan'sya" (Stay); Co-written with Maxim Fadeev and Olga Seryabkina (MOLLY)	Oleg Mayami	2016
4	"Bandity" (Bandits)	DSIDE BAND	2017
5	"Potantsuy" (Dance); Co-written with Nadia Dorofeeva)	Yulianna Karaulova	2017
6	"Uvlechenie" (Infatuation); Co-written with Anna Sedokova)	Anna Sedokova	2017
7	"Ves' mir" (The Whole World)	Yulianna Karaulova	2017
8	"Leti za mnoy" (Fly After Me)	Yulianna Karaulova	2017
9	"Zatumanila" (You Clouded)	Denis Rekonvald	2017
10	"Mechtay" (Dream)	Arina Danilova feat. HARU	2018
11	"Vyshe neba" (Above the Sky)	Arina Danilova	2018
12	"Volna" (Wave)	Arina Danilova	2018
13	"Pover' mne" (Believe Me)	DSIDE BAND	2019
14	"Polunochnoe taksi" (Midnight Taxi)	Dima Bilan	2019
15	"Mira malo" (Not Enough World)	LOBODA	2019
16	"Kholodno i teplo" (Cold and Warm)	Uliana Royce	2020
17	"Romany" (Romances)	Philipp Kirkorov	2020
18	"Don't Try to Run"	Oksana Gordeeva	2020
19	"Se lya vi" (C'est la vie)	Albina Dzhanabaeva	2020
20	"Neonovaya noch'" (Neon Night)	Dima Bilan	2020
21	"No More"; Co-written with KERRIA	KERRIA	2020
22	"Love Is Freedom"	Myata	2020
23	"V/V"	ABBASOV	2020
24	"Sayounara"	Uliana Royce	2020
25	"Dreams"	Dima Bilan	2020
26	"Moya voda" (My Water)	ABBASOV	2020
27	"Pokokhala" (Fell in Love)	Uliana Royce	2020
28	"Serdtse" (Heart)	Dima Bilan	2020
29	"More" (Sea)	ABBASOV	2020
30	"Vmeste do luny" (Together to the Moon)	ABBASOV	2021
31	"Moi pravila" (My Rules)	Uliana Royce	2021
32	"Diktofon" (Dictaphone)	Anna Trincher	2021
33	"TET-A-TET"; Co-written with Natalia Medvedeva	Natalia Medvedeva	2021
34	"Beskonechno" (Endlessly)	ABBASOV	2021
35	"Lyubimy moy chelovek" (My Beloved Person)	TO-MA	2021

== Videography ==
Video	Director	Album	Year	
"Rodnaya" (Dear)	Artem Pivovarov	Kosmos	2013	
"Lechshe" (Easier)	Artem Pivovarov and Serhiy Matsenko	Kosmos	2014	
"My molody" (We Are Young)	Oleksandr Oduvanchikov	Okean	2015	
"Sobiray menya" (Collect Me)	Oleksandr Oduvanchikov	Okean	2015	
"Zavisimy" (Dependent)	Taras Holubkov	Okean	2015	
"Mussony" (Monsoons) (Mot feat. Artem Pivovarov)	Katya Yak	Naiznanku (Mot's album)	2016	
"Stikhiya" (Element)	Leonid Kolosovskyi	Stikhiya vody	2016	
"Na glubine" (At the Depth)	Taras Holubkov	Stikhiya vody	2016	
"Delay svoe delo" (Do Your Thing) (feat. Ne Lyudi)	Dima Manifest and Dmytro Shmurak	Non-album single	2016	
"Kislorod" (Oxygen)	Taras Holubkov	Stikhiya vody	2017	
"Moya noch'" (My Night)	Taras Holubkov	Stikhiya vody	2017	
"Polnolunie" (Full Moon)	Dima Manifest and Dmytro Shmurak	Stikhiya ognya	2018	
"Provintsial'nyy" (Provincial)	Taras Holubkov	Stikhiya ognya	2018	
"Vidchuy" (Feel)	Taras Holubkov	Non-album single	2018	
"Karma"	Taras Holubkov	Zemnoy	2018	
"No.1"	Taras Holubkov	Zemnoy	2019	
"V kazhdom iz nas" (In Each of Us) (feat. Yolka)	Maksym Serikov, Maksym Basyst	Zemnoy	2019	
"2000"	Taras Holubkov	Zemnoy	2019	
"Dom" (Home)	Taras Holubkov	Zemnoy	2019	
"Dezhavyu / Pozovi" (Déjà Vu / Call)	Taras Holubkov	Zemnoy	2019	
"Moi stikhi, tvoi noty" (My Poems, Your Notes) (Animation Music Video)	Savka	Zemnoy	Zemnoy	2020
"Randevu" (Rendezvous)	Taras Holubkov	Non-album single	2021	
"Mirazh" (Mirage)	Taras Holubkov	Non-album single	2021	

=== Pivovarov's most popular songs ===
Some of his most famous hits:

- Маніфест (Manifest)
- Дежавю (Déjà vu)
- Міраж (Mirage)
- Рандеву (Rendezvous)
- Дом (Home)
- Собирай Меня (Gather me)
- Кислород (Oxygen)
- Моя Ніч (My Night)
- No.1

== Awards and nominations ==
Year	Award	Category	Work	Result
2019	M1 Music Awards	Breakthrough of the Year	"No.1"	Nominated
2019	Ukrainian Music Platform	Best Song of the Year	"2000"	Won
2020	TopHit Music Awards	Breakthrough of the Year	—N/a	Won
2020	TopHit Music Awards	YouTube Ukraine Rising Star	—N/a	Won
2020	Ukrainian Music Platform	Best Song of the Year	"Dezhavyu" (Déjà Vu)	Won
2021	TopHit Music Awards	Best Male Artist on Radio	—N/a	Won
2021	TopHit Music Awards	Best Male Artist on YouTube Ukraine	—N/a	Won
2021	TopHit Music Awards	Song of the Year (Male Vocal)	"Dezhavyu" (Déjà Vu)	Won
2021	TopHit Music Awards	Song of the Year (Male Vocal)	"Randevu" (Rendezvous)	Won
2021	TopHit Music Awards	Music Video of the Year (Male Vocal) on YouTube Ukraine	"Dezhavyu" (Déjà Vu)	Won
2021	YUNA Awards	Best Male Artist	—N/a	Nominated
2021	YUNA Awards	Best Song	"Dezhavyu" (Déjà Vu)	Won
2021	YUNA Awards	Best Album	Zemnoy	Nominated
2021	Ukrainian Song of the Year	Hope of Ukrainian Song	"Dezhavyu" (Déjà Vu)	Won
2021	Ukrainian Music Platform	Best Song of the Year	"Chomu" (Why) (with Oleksandr Ponomariov, DZIDZIO, and Alekseev)	Won
2022	Ukrainian Song of the Year	Hope of Ukrainian Song	"Randevu" (Rendezvous)	Won
2022	YUNA Awards	Best Male Artist	—N/a	Won
2022	YUNA Awards	Best Song	"Randevu" (Rendezvous)	Nominated
2022	YUNA Awards	Best Duet/Collaboration	"Chomu" (Why) (with Oleksandr Ponomariov, DZIDZIO, and Alekseev)	Nominated
2022	YUNA Awards	Best Music Video	"Randevu" (Rendezvous)	Nominated
2022	YUNA Awards	Best Concert Show	Stikhiyna akustyka (Elemental Acoustics)	Nominated

- 2022 – Order of Merit, III degree
