= Kola (singer) =

Ukrainian singer (born 1993)

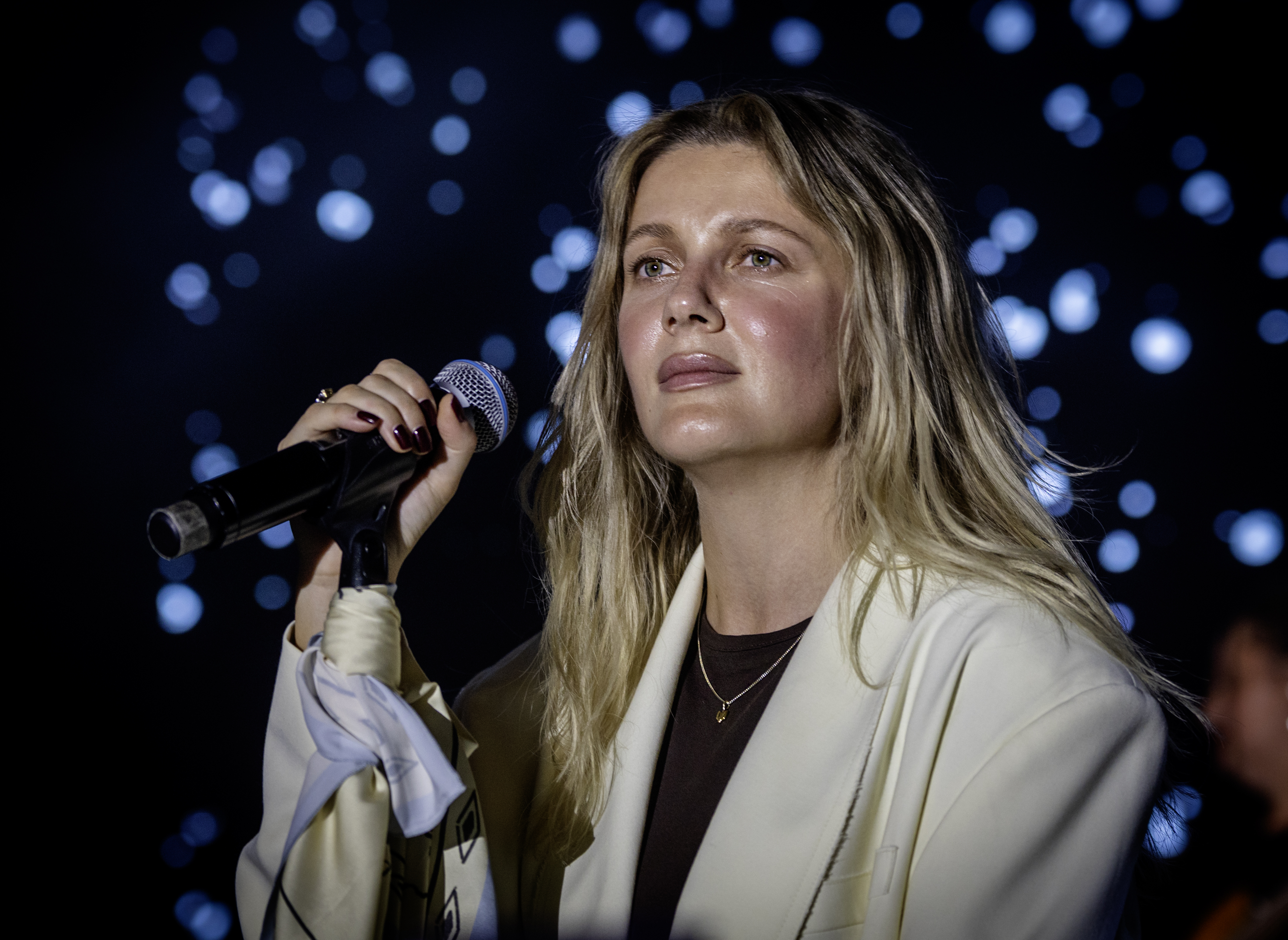
- Born: Anastasia Olehivna Prudius; 19 October 1992 (age 33); Kharkiv, Ukraine
- Other name: Kola
- Occupation: Singer
- Years active: 2018–present
- Musical career
- Instrument: Vocals

Anastasiia Olehivna Prudius (Ukrainian: Анастасія Олегівна Прудіус), born 19 October 1992), more popularly known by her stage name Kola (stylized in all caps), is a Ukrainian singer, songwriter and performer of her own songs. Participant of the talent shows "X-Factor" (2013) and "Holos Krainy" (2016, 2021), national selection of the Eurovision Song Contest 2017.

KOLA's producer is Ivan Klymenko, with whom she writes songs. In 2022, the video for the song "Chy razom?" garnered more than 11 million views and hit YouTube trends, and in the summer it was second on the Apple Music top 100 chart in Ukraine.

== Videoclips ==
- "Porichka" / «Порічка» (2023, with YAKTAK)
- "Liudy" / «Люди» (2023, with MamaRika)
- "Holos" / «Голос» (2022)
- "Lystopad" / «Листопад» (2022)
- "Dontsi" / «Доньці» (2022, with Vyshebaba)
- "Bilia sertsia" / «Біля серця» (2022)
- "Dochekaius" / «Дочекаюсь» (2022)
- "Chy razom?" / «Чи разом?» (2022)
- "Maiu" / «Маю» (2022)
- "Parasoli" / «Парасолі» (2022)
- "Ukraino – my syla" / «Україно – ми сила» (2022)
- "Pershe kokhania" / «Перше кохання» (2022)
- "Malenka divchynka" / «Маленька дівчинка» (2022, with Skofka)
- "Ba" / «Ба» (2021, with Skofka)
- "Prokhana hostia" / «Прохана гостя» (2021)
- "Synkhrofazatron" / «Синхрофазатрон» (2020)
- "Zombi" / «Зомбі» (2018)

== Awards ==
Year	Subject	Category	Awards	Result	Ref
2023	Bilia sertsia	Song of unbreakable Ukraine	YUNA	Won	
