= Holos Krainy =

Ukrainian television series

- Also known as: The Voice of the Country; Golos Krainy
- Ukrainian: Holos Krainy; Голос країни
- Genre: Talent show
- Created by: John de Mol Jr.
- Presented by: Andriy Domansʹkyy; Kateryna Osadcha; Anatoliy Anatolich (backstage); Mykyta Dobrynin (backstage); Olʹha Freymut; Yuriy Horbunov; Artem Gagarin (backstage); Vira Kekelia (backstage); Slava Demin (backstage)
- Judges: Diana Arbenina; Ruslana Lyzhychko; Stas Piekha; Oleksandr Ponomariov; Oleh Skrypka; Valeriya; Tina Karol; Svyatoslav Vakarchuk; Tamara Gverdtsiteli; Sergey Lazarev; Ani Lorak; Potap; Ivan Dorn; Serhii Babkin; Jamala; Dan Balan; Monatik; NK; Nadya Dorofeeva; Olegg Vynnyk; Olya Polyakova; Oleksandra Zarits'ka & Andriy Matsola; Julia Sanina; Artem Pyvovarov; Ivan Klymenko; Natalia Mohylevska
- Country of origin: Ukraine
- Original languages: Ukrainian, Russian (until 2022)
- No. of seasons: 14
- No. of episodes: 186

Production
- Executive producer: John de Mol Jr.
- Producers: Viktoria Liezina; Hanna Pagava; Volodymyr Zavadyuk; Hanna Aksyutenko; Ruslan Kvinta; Iryna Ionova
- Production companies: Talpa (2011–2019); ITV Studios (2020–)

Original release
- Network: 1+1, TET, 1+1 Ukraine
- Release: 22 May 2011 – present

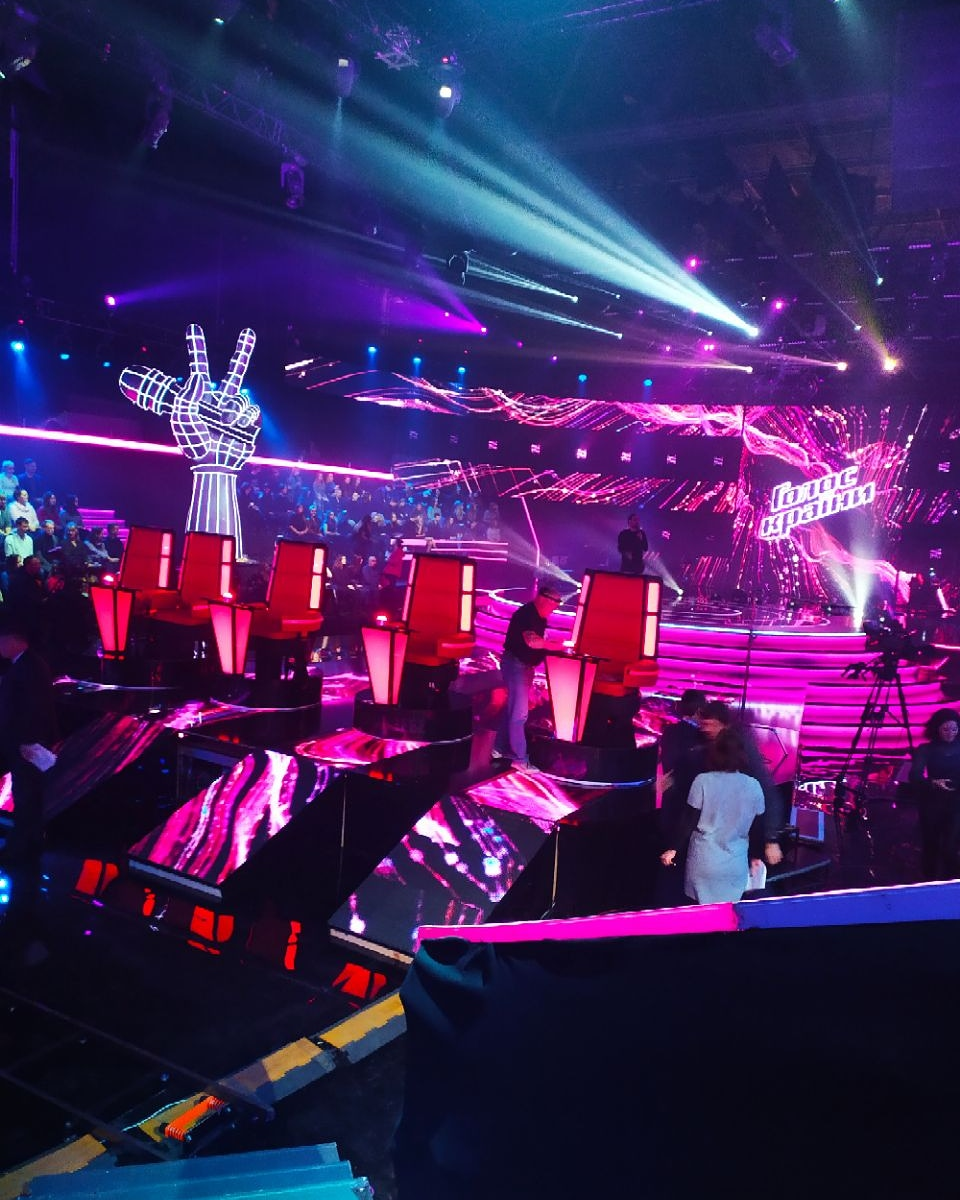

Holos Krainy (Ukrainian: Голос країни, lit. 'The Voice of the Country') is a Ukrainian reality talent show that premiered on the 1+1 network on 22 May 2011. Holos Krainy is part of the international syndication The Voice based on the reality singing competition launched in the Netherlands as The Voice of Holland, created by Dutch television producer John de Mol Jr.. It was the second international adaptation of the programme, after the American version. There is also a children version of the same show, Holos. Dity.

== Format ==
The Voice is a reality television series that features four coaches looking for a talented new artist, who could become a global superstar. The show's concept is indicated by its title: the coaches do not judge the artists by their looks, personalities, stage presence, or dance routines—only their vocal ability. It is this aspect that differentiates The Voice from other reality television series such as The X Factor, and Ukraine's Got Talent. The competitors are split into four teams, which are mentored by the coaches who in turn choose songs for their artists to perform. There is no specific age range and anyone can audition; if a coach likes what they hear, a button press allows their chair to spin around and face the performer, signifying that they would like to mentor them. If more than one does so, then the artist selects a coach. However, if no coach turns around then the artist is sent home.

There are 5 different stages: producers' auditions, Blind auditions, Battle phase, Knockout stage, and live shows.

The Blind Auditions

After the preliminary casting, which is directed by the show's music producer, the selected contestants advance to the next round - the "Blind Auditions". As part of the "blind auditions", 4 mentors select participants for their team without seeing them, sitting with their backs to the stage and hearing only their voices. If an artist's vocal impresses one of the coaches, while the music is playing, he turns his chair towards the stage. If one coach turns to the vocalist, then the participant automatically becomes part of his/her team, if there are several, the participant chooses which team to join. Each coach needs to recruit 14 artists in their teams for the 1-6 seasons. In season 7, coaches' teams were raised to 16 per team. In season 13, coaches need to recruit only 10 artists in their teams.

In season 8, the rules change: a participant who has not deployed a single chair immediately leaves the stage, but this is canceled in the following season. In season 9, a "block" is introduced: a coach has the right to "block" one of the other coaches once in the entire duration of the blind auditions, that is, to prevent one coach from getting an artist into his/her team. The coaches are allowed to use it once in the entire blind auditions. Starting from season 11, the block button was removed.

The Battle Rounds

The coach divides their members into pairs. The coach provides each duet with a composition for performance, which will be performed in a special "vocal ring". After the performance, each coach listens to the opinions of other mentors and chooses the winner of the battle. The loser is initially eliminated from the show for the 1-2 seasons, but starting from season 3, coaches have the opportunity to "steal" one participant from another team who lost a battle, saving him/her from being eliminated.

In season 7, a new rule is added - the steal room. This was first adopted in the 7th season of The Voice of Holland. If the coach "stole" one of the participants, then he goes to a special room, in which he sits on a chair corresponding to the mentor who "stole" him. If then the same mentor steals another artist, then the one currently seated will be eliminated and will be replaced by the newly-stolen artist. In season 12, the coaches are allowed to save their own artist, though they can only do it once in the entire battle rounds.

In season 13, the coaches divides into 4 groups (2 groups of pairs and 2 groups of trios) to sing a song together. Four contestants remain in each team and advance to the cross battles, with each battle group can have one, multiple, or no winners.

The Knockouts

In season 3, a new stage appeared - "Super Battles" ("Knockouts"). The participants who remained after the vocal battles are distributed by the mentor into pairs (4 pairs from each team). At this stage, the participants themselves choose the compositions with which they will fight for participation in live broadcasts. Also, in each pair, the participants perform separately, in turn. In each knockout, the coach determines the winner, who will advance to the live shows. The other artist will be eliminated.

Starting from season 6, the trainer does not divide the participants into pairs, but “chairs” are introduced. After the participant's performance, the mentor either offers to give the artist a chair or immediately sends him home. Only 4 from each team will advance to the live shows. In season 10, each mentor has the opportunity to "steal" one artist from other teams, whom the mentor initially eliminated the artist. In season 11, one eliminated artist from each team will be saved by public voting. In season 12, only three chairs were given per team and only three per team advanced to the live shows.

In season 13, the knockouts were replaced by the cross-battles. In the cross battles, one contestant from one team gets paired with a contestant from another team and both artists sing to win the audience vote. The winner of each cross battle moves to the final, while the other artist is eliminated from the competition. Also, due to the results of this round being solely for the artist, it was not guaranteed that all coaches would be represented in the finale. However, every coach had at least one artist on their team that won the cross battle and advanced to the finale.

The Live Shows

On live broadcasts, the participants perform solo. The further participation of artists in the project is decided by viewers by SMS voting. The participant with the largest number of audience votes in each team automatically goes to the next round, and the coach selects one of the remaining 3 or 4 participants in the project. In the Semi-final of the project, the participants who will go further are determined by the sum of points from the audience (as a percentage of votes per team) and a mentor (who distributes 100% between their wards). Each team in the Superfinal is represented by one participant. The final voting takes place in three rounds, in each of which one participant is eliminated. Votes are canceled after each round. The participant who takes first place in the final vote becomes the winner of the show.

The winner receives a contract with the record company Universal Music. Since the 7th season, the rules have changed. Now the winner of the show gets an apartment in Kyiv.

== Coaches and finalists ==
– Winning coach and contestant
– Runner-up coach and contestant
– 3rd place coach and contestant
– 4th place coach and contestant

- These are each of the coaches teams throughout the seasons on the live shows. Winners are in **bold**, finalists are listed first and eliminated artists are in small font.

Season	Coaches and contestants				
Season	Ruslana Lyzhychko	Stas Piekha	Diana Arbenina	Oleksandr Ponomariov	—N/a
1	– Antonina Matviienko – Vasyl Lohay – Yevheniia Chervonozhko – Eshtar Radi – Artem Vereshchaka – Dmytro Ivashchenko	– Arsen Mirzoian – Mila Nitich – Stanislav Konkin – Olha Shanis – Oleksiy Martynenko – Roman Stokolos	– **Ivan Hanzera** – Natalia Hordiienko – Serhiy Yurchenko – Lika Buhaiova – Tasha Kruz – Volodymyr Okilko	– Vladyslav Sytnyk – Kateryna Hrachova – Daria Mineieva – Iryna Poyzen – Alina Bashkina – Dmytro Teimurazov	—N/a
2	Oleh Skrypka	Diana Arbenina	Oleksandr Ponomariov	Valeriya	—N/a
2	– Nazar Savko – Illaria – Vasyl Zhadan – Ihor Petrov – Khrystyna Kovaliova – Olesia Kyrychuk	– **Pavlo Tabakov** – Oleksandr Onofriichuk – Rozhden Anusi – Pavlo Smyrnov – Dmytro Selianskyi – Denys Zhupnyk	– Mariya Yaremchuk – Kyrylo Turychenko – Halyna Bezruk – Roman Bolduzev – Yana Yudina – Oksana Komar	– Anhelina Moniak – Natalia Pichkur – Nillo – Denys Fedorenko – Volodymyr Banderas – Olha Pankratova	—N/a
3	Oleh Skrypka	Svyatoslav Vakarchuk	Tina Karol	Oleksandr Ponomariov	—N/a
3	– Artem Kondratiuk – Ihor Siarkevych – Aliona Zhyhariova – Tetiana Ozhelevska	– Oto Nemsadze – Khrystyna Soloviy – Michael Kirkilan – Blez Malaba	– Taras Melnyk – London Hill – Olha Syvakova – Oleksiy Kovaliov	– **Anna Khodorovska** – Serhiy Ruchkin – Radmir Mukhtarov – Yuriy Kambarian	—N/a
4	Svyatoslav Vakarchuk	Tamara Gverdtsiteli	Ani Lorak	Sergey Lazarev	—N/a
4	– **Igor Grohotsky** – Vasiliy Miszczenko – Leonardo Obodeyake – Darin Kirilko	– Michael Mirka – Vagif Nagiyev – Olga Zhmurina – Dmitri Eremenko	– Marlene Karimow – Mega Gogitidze – Vladislav Volovikov – Nikita Alekseev	– Olha Melnik – Wiaczesław Rybikov – Anna Korsun – Yulia Sirenko	—N/a
5	Svyatoslav Vakarchuk	Tina Karol	Potap	Oleksandr Ponomariov	—N/a
5	– Andrew Luchanko – MEBO Nutsubidze – Lusya Chebotina – Felix Morozow	– **Anton Kopytin** – Ivan Pylypets – Jurij Kowalczuk – Anis Ettaeb	– Tetyana Reshetnyak – Dmitriy Kostyuk – Nikita Obushenko – Katarzyna Fisher	– Eugene Tolochny – Vladislav Kashpurenko − Valery Chuprina – Valery Sadovskaya	—N/a
6	Svyatoslav Vakarchuk	Tina Karol	Potap	Ivan Dorn	—N/a
6	– **Vitalina Musienko** – Ivanna Chervynska – Marharyta Tyshkevych – Mykola Bobryk	– Inna Ishchenko – Ahata Vilchyk – Oleksandr Kazakov – Anton Yakubovskyi	– Pavlo Paliychuk – Nazar B'Tselem – Tetiana Amirova – Marharyta Myaleshka	– Vlad Karashchuk – Yulia Yuryna – Kostiantyn Dmitriev – Khrystyna Oleksin	—N/a
7	Tina Karol	Potap	Jamala	Serhii Babkin	—N/a
7	– **Aleksander Klimenko** – Katya Chilly – Halyna Shkoda – Anastasia Malashkevych	– Ingret Kostenko – Roman Rusyi – Nini Tsnobiladze – Vladyslav Byelik	– Anna Kuksа − Naile Ibraimova – Yana Blinder – Olha Bohatyrenko	– Vera Kekelia – Marta Adamchuck – Roman Duda – Yehor Sharankov	—N/a
8	– Andriy Rybarchuk – Mikhail Sosunov – Olena Karas – Nude Voices	– Srbuhi Sargsyan – Nikita Trondin – Violetta Litvinenko – Ziandzha	– Anna Trincher – Kristina Khramova – Arsen Vitrecki – Adriana Shevchuk	– **Elena Lutsenko** – Dmitry Samko – Valentin Belenky – Alexander Chekmaryov	—N/a
9	Dan Balan	Tina Karol	Monatik	Potap	—N/a
9	– **Oksana Mukha** – Haitham Rafi – Kateryna Behu – Vyacheslav Kretov	– Andriy Khayat – David Axelrod – Nika Tupilko – Kseniya Bakhchalova	– Victoria Oliynyk – Andriy Karpov – Vlad & Roman Tarantsovy – Alina Pidluzhna	– Karyna Arsentyeva – Victoria Yagich – Arseniy Zhuravel – Bohdana Renk	—N/a
10	Dan Balan	Tina Karol	Monatik	PTP & NK	—N/a
10	– Indira Edilbaeva – Anastasia Baloh – Daria Petrozhytska – Nazar Yatsyshyn – Mariya Kondratenko	– **Roman Sasanchyn** – Olha Melnik – Daria Polorotova – Anna Trubetskaya – Daniel Salem	– Serhiy Asafatov – Yuriy Samovilov – Melen Passa – Lida Lee – Serhiy Roman	– Erlan Baybazarov – Kateryna Stepura & Maksym Perepelytsya – Anastasia Kartvelisvilli – Yulia Korovko – Vitaliy Oks	—N/a
11	Tina Karol	Oleh Vynnyk	Nadya Dorofeeva	Monatik	—N/a
11	– Yulia Timochko – Kateryna Hladiy – Nikita Lomakin – Mila Nitich – Denys Kalytovskyi	– Serhiy Neychev – Halyna Kuryshko – Dilyara Didarkyzy – Bohdan Mukha – Andriy Kudinov	– **Serhiy Lazanovskyi** – Illya Nikolaenko – Iryna Ebralidze – Illya Reznikov – Andriy Naumenko	– Tyoma Pauchek – Anastasia Prudius – Sasha Tab – Volodymyr Khomenko – Anastasia Bukhantsova	—N/a
12	Svyatoslav Vakarchuk (Note: Aliye Khadzhabadinova, Mykhaylo Tsar, and Anna Kindzers'ka had to be moved into the teams of Dorofeeva, Potap, and Olya, respectively, since Svyatoslav Vakarchuk did not return for the finale live show.)	Nadya Dorofeeva	Potap	Olya Polyakova	Oleksandra & Andriy
12	~~– Aliye Khadzhabadinov~~; ~~– Anna Kindzers'ka~~; ~~– Mykhaylo Tsar~~	– Davyd Maskisa – Aliye Khadzhabadinova – Inesa Hrytsayenko – Oleksandr Sviridenko	– Vasylʹ Palyukh – Karyna Stolaba – Pavlo Nazhyha – Mykhailo Tsar	– Serhiy Solovyov – Olena Chukalenko – Dimash Dauletov – Anna Kindzers'ka	– **Mariya Kvitka** – Marta Lyubchik – Marta Lypchey – Pavlo Tyutyunnyk
13	Ivan Klymenko	Nadya Dorofeeva	Artem Pyvovarov	Julia Sanina	—N/a
13	– Anastasiya Chaban – Veronika Kovalenko – Ol'ha Shcherbak & Oleksandra Roiko – Yelyzaveta Shaforost	– Yuriy Horodets'kyy – Roman Panchenko – Mairamik Avoian – Edhar Yenokian	– **Mykhailo Panchyshyn** – Hidayat Seidov – Izabella Ivashchenko – Vlad Sheryf	– Khrystyna Starykova – Vlad Pelykh – Halyna Pechenizhs'ka – Mariia Stasiuk	—N/a
14	Artem Pyvovarov	Tina Karol	Natalya Mohylevska	Monatik	—N/a
14	Current Season				—N/a

== Series overview ==
Warning: the following table presents a significant amount of different colors.

Teams color key
Artist from Team Diana	Artist from Team Ani	Artist from Team Olya
Artist from Team Ruslana	Artist from Team Potap	Artist from Team Oleksandra & Andriy
Artist from Team Stas	Artist from Team Ivan D.	Artist from Team Julia
Artist from Team Oleksandr	Artist from Team Serhiy	Artist from Team Pyvovarov
Artist from Team Oleh	Artist from Team Jamala	Artist from Team Ivan K.
Artist from Team Valeriya	Artist from Team Dan
Artist from Team Tina	Artist from Team Monatik
Artist from Team Svyatoslav	Artist from Team PTP & NK
Artist from Team Tamara	Artist from Team DOROFEEVA
Artist from Team Sergey	Artist from Team Olegg

Holos Krainy series overview
Season	First aired	Last aired	Winner	Other finalists			Winning coach	Presenter(s)
1	22 May 2011	11 Sep 2011	Ivan Hanzera	Antonina Matviienko	Vladyslav Sytnyk	Arsen Mirzoian	Diana Arbenina	Andriy Domansʹkyy, Kateryna Osadcha
2	8 Jan 2012	29 Apr 2012	Pavlo Tabakov	Anhelina Moniak	Nazar Savko	Mariya Yaremchuk	Diana Arbenina	Andriy Domansʹkyy, Kateryna Osadcha
3	10 Mar 2013	9 June 2013	Anna Khodorovsʹka	Otar Nemsadze	Artem Kondratyuk	Taras Melnyk	Oleksandr Ponomaryov	Andriy Domansʹkyy, Kateryna Osadcha
4	2 Mar 2014	8 June 2014	Ihor Hrokhotsʹkyy	Marlen Karimov	Olga Melnik	Mykhailo Myrka	Svyatoslav Vakarchuk	Olʹha Freymut
5	8 Mar 2015	7 June 2015	Anton Kopityn	Tetiana Reshetniak	Andrii Luchanko	Yevhen Tolochnyi	Tina Karol	Olʹha Freymut, Yuriy Horbunov
6	28 Feb 2016	29 May 2016	Vitalina Musyenko	Inna Ishchenko	Pavlo Paliychuk	Vlad Karashchuk	Svyatoslav Vakarchuk	Kateryna Osadcha, Yuriy Horbunov
7	22 Jan 2017	23 Apr 2017	Oleksandr Klymenko	Ingret Kostenko	Vira Kekeliia	Anna Kuksa	Tina Karol	Kateryna Osadcha, Yuriy Horbunov
8	28 Jan 2018	29 Apr 2018	Olena Lutsenko	Andriy Rybarchuk	Anna Trincher	Srbuhi Sargsyan	Serhii Babkin	Kateryna Osadcha, Yuriy Horbunov
9	20 Jan 2019	21 Apr 2019	Oksana Mukha	Karyna Arsentyeva	Andriy Khayat	Victoria Oliynyk	Dan Balan	Kateryna Osadcha, Yuriy Horbunov
10	19 Jan 2020	26 Apr 2020	Roman Sasanchyn	Erlan Baybazarov	Indira Edilbaeva	Serhiy Asafatov	Tina Karol	Kateryna Osadcha, Yuriy Horbunov
11	24 Jan 2021	25 Apr 2021	Serhiy Lazanovskyy	Yulia Tymochko	Tyoma Pauchek	Serhiy Neychev	DOROFEEVA	Kateryna Osadcha, Yuriy Horbunov
12	23 Jan 2022	20 Nov 2022	Mariya Kvitka	Davyd Maskisa	Serhiy Solovyov	Vasylʹ Palyukh	Oleksandra & Andriy	Kateryna Osadcha, Yuriy Horbunov
13	3 Sep 2023	29 Oct 2023	Mykhailo Panchyshyn	Yuriy Horodets'kyy	Anastasiya Chaban	Khrystyna Starykova	Artem Pyvovarov	Kateryna Osadcha, Yuriy Horbunov
14	25 Oct 2026	1 Jan 2027	Current Season					Kateryna Osadcha, Yuriy Horbunov

=== Coaches' results ===
Coaches' results
Coach	Winner	Runner-up	Third place	Fourth place
Tina Karol	3 times (5, 7, 10)	3 times (6,8,11)	Once (9)	Once (3)
Diana Arbenina	2 times (1–2)	—	—	—
Svyatoslav Vakarchuk	2 times (4, 6)	Once (3)	Once (5)	—
Oleksandr Ponomaryov	Once (3)	—	Once (1)	2 times (2, 5)
Serhii Babkin	Once (8)	—	Once (7)	—
Dan Balan	Once (9)	Once (10)	—	—
DOROFEEVA	Once (11)	Once (13)	Once (12)	—
Oleksandra & Andriy	Once (12)	—	—	—
Artem Pyvovarov	Once (13)	—	—	—
Potap	—	4 times (5, 7, 9, 12)	Once (6)	Once (8)
Monatik	—	Once (10)	Once (11)	Once (9)
Ruslana	—	Once (1)	—	—
Valeriya	—	Once (2)	—	—
Ani Lorak	—	Once (4)	—	—
Potap & NK	—	Once (10)	—	—
Olya Polyakova	—	Once (12)	—	—
Oleh Skrypka	—	—	Twice (2, 3)	—
Jamala	—	—	Once (8)	Once (7)
Sergey Lazarev	—	—	Once (4)	—
Julia Sanina	—	—	Once (13)	—
Ivan Klymenko	—	—	Once (13)	—
Stas Piekha	—	—	—	Once (1)
Tamara Gverdtsiteli	—	—	—	Once (4)
Ivan Dorn	—	—	—	Once (6)
Olegg Vynnyk	—	—	—	Once (11)
Natalia Mohylevska	TBA			

== Coaches ==
=== Timeline ===
Key
Featured as a full-time coach.
Featured as a part-time advisor.

K	Coach(es)	Seasons													
K	Coach(es)	1	2	3	4	5	6	7	8	9	10	11	12	13	14
	Oleksandr Ponomariov														
	Diana Arbenina														
	Ruslana														
	Stas Piekha														
	Oleh Skrypka														
	Valeriya														
	Svyatoslav Vakarchuk														
	Tina Karol														
	Ani Lorak														
	Sergey Lazarev														
	Tamara Gverdtsiteli														
	Potap (Note: Solo coach: 5–9 and 12. Duo coach with NK: 10.)														
	Ivan Dorn														
	Jamala														
	Serhii Babkin														
	MONATIK														
	Dan Balan														
	NK (Note: Duo coach with Potap.)														
	DOROFEEVA														
	Olegg Vynnyk														
	Olya Polyakova														
	Oleksandra & Andriy (Note: Served as coaches for season twelve's YouTube competition, "Second Chance".)														
	Artem Pyvovarov														
	Julia Sanina														
	Ivan Klymenko														
	Natalia Mohylevska														

=== Gallery ===
Coaches gallery

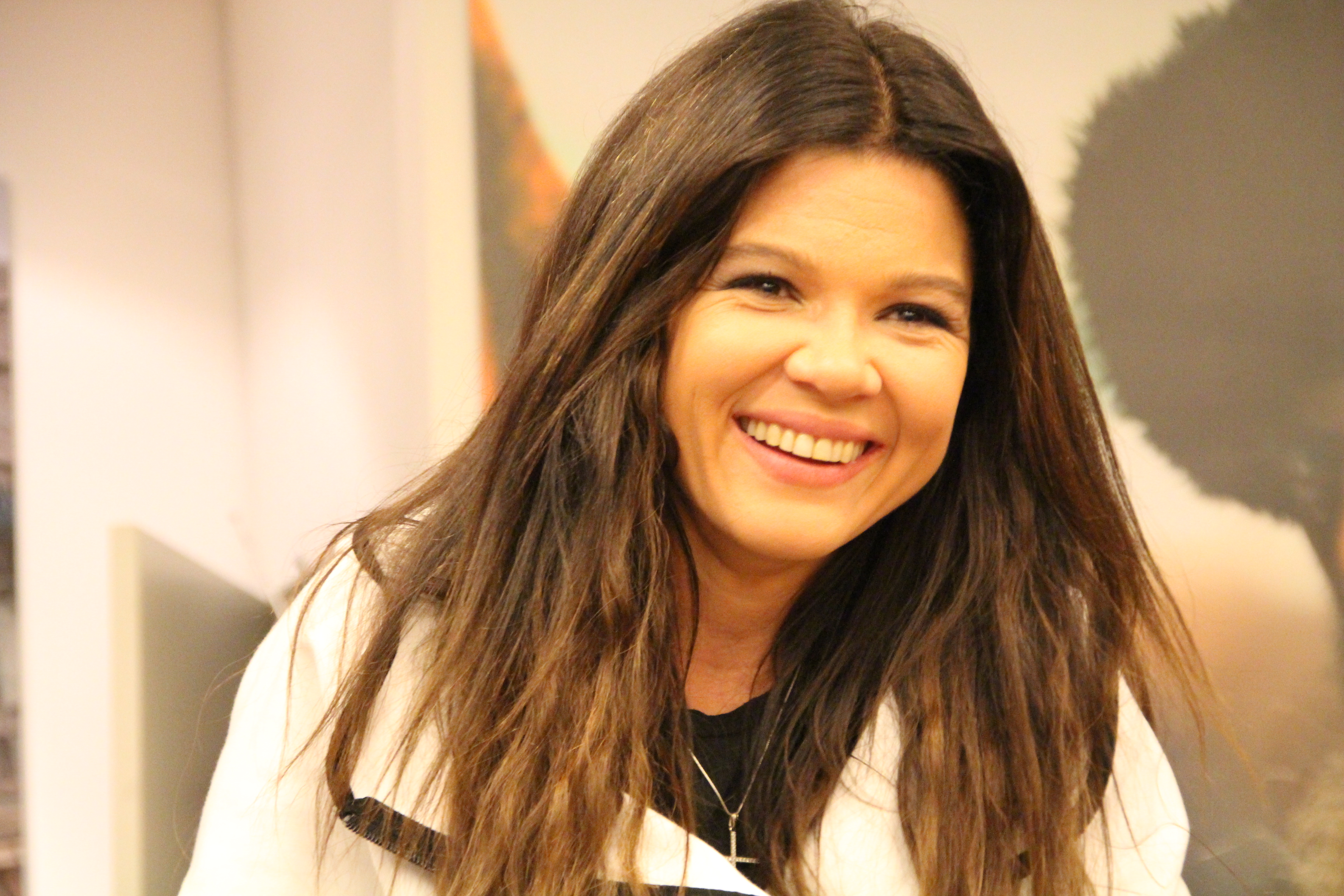
Ruslana (2011)

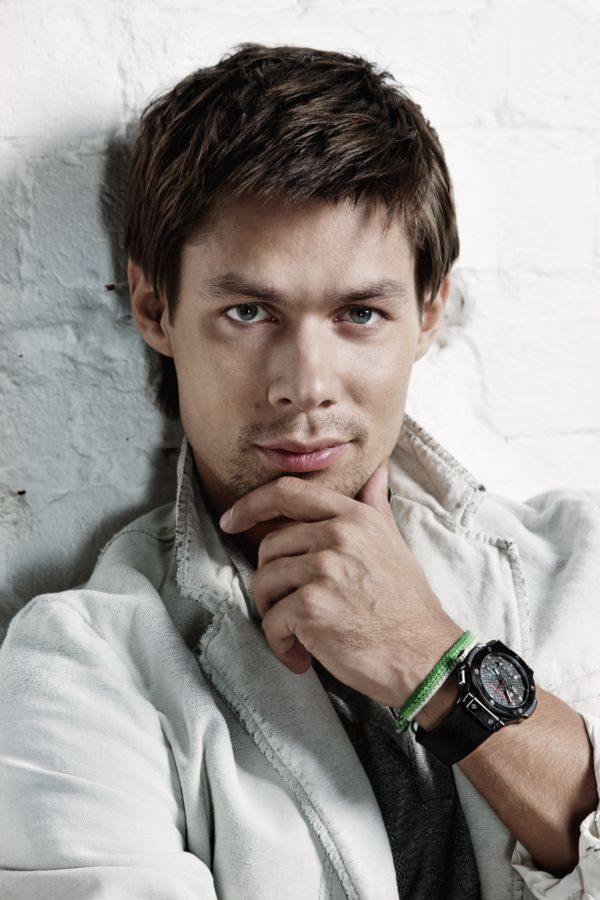
Stas Piekha (2011)

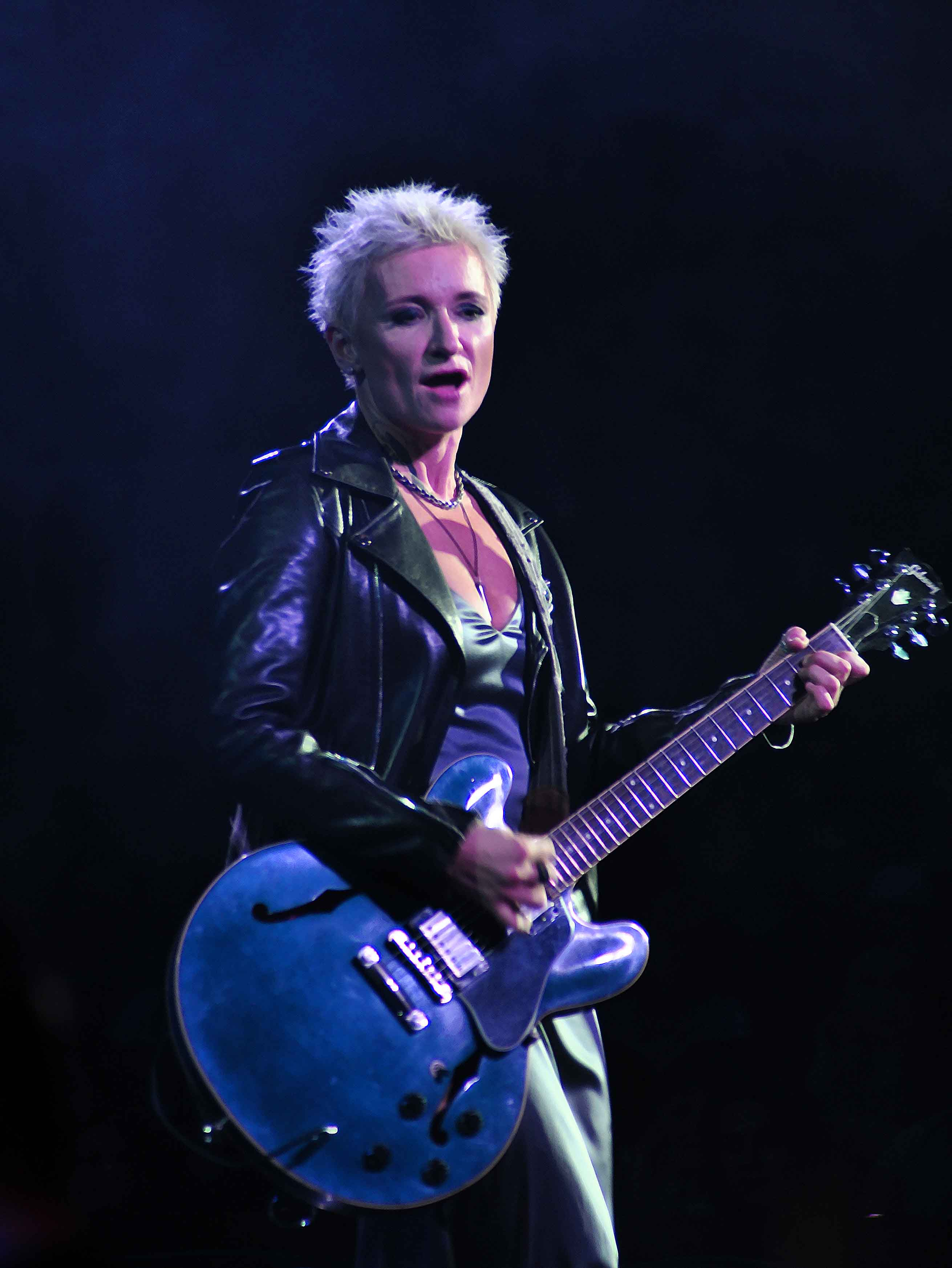
Diana Arbenina (2011–2012)

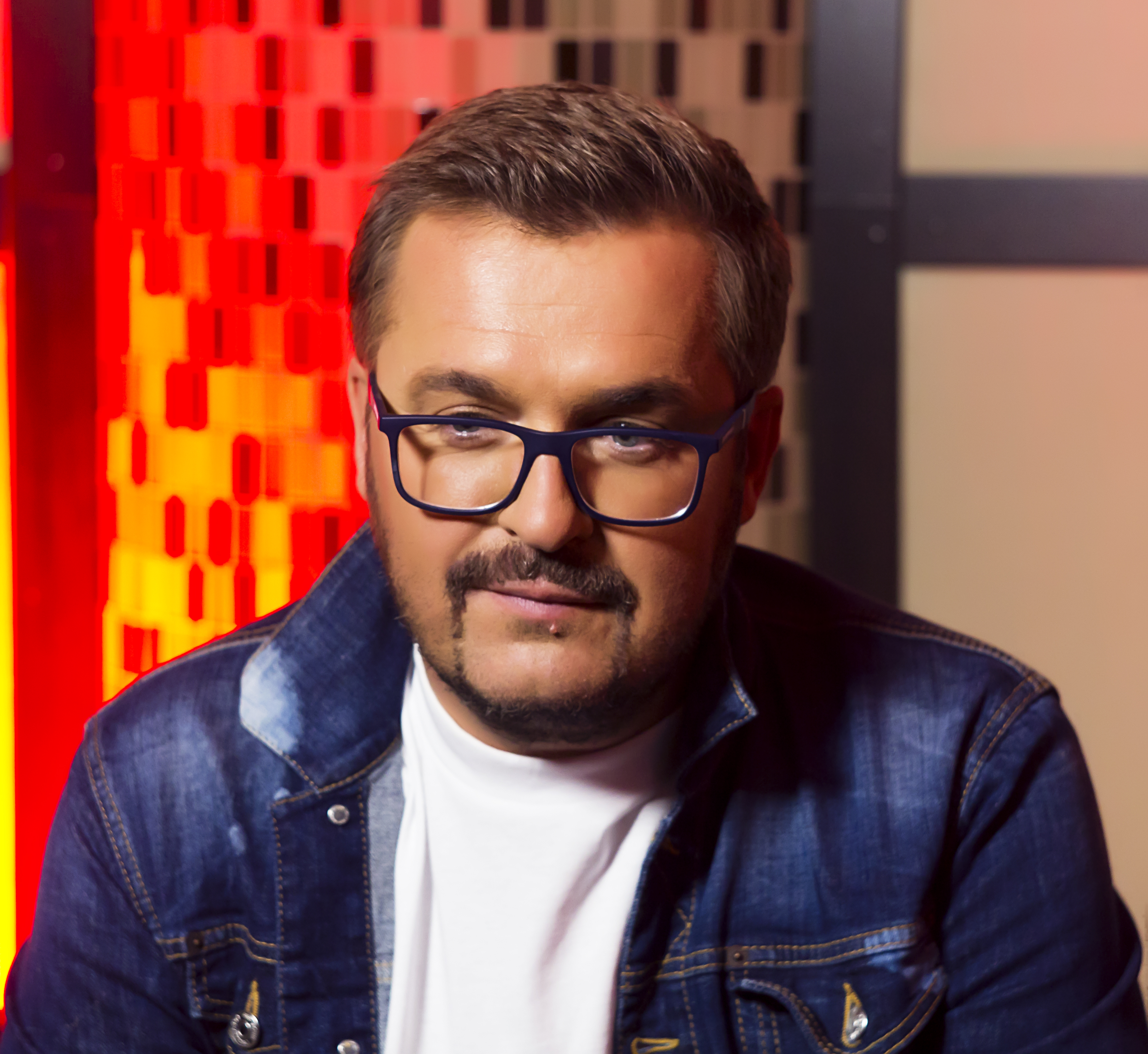
Oleksandr Ponomariov (2011–2013, 2015)

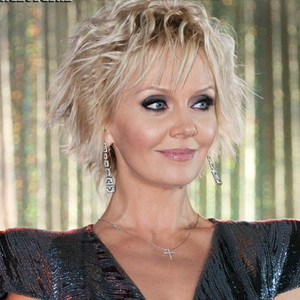
Valeriya (2012)

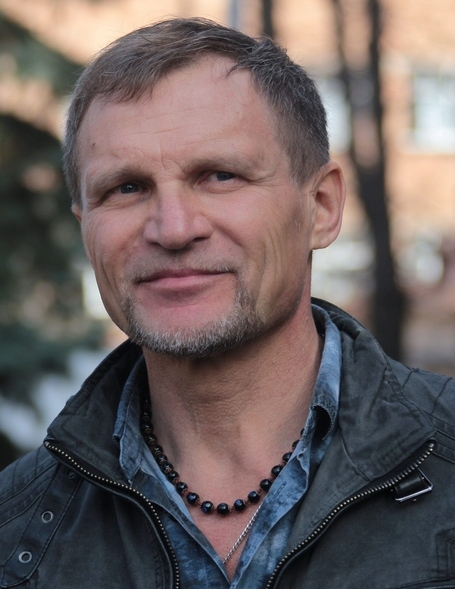
Oleh Skrypka (2012–2013)

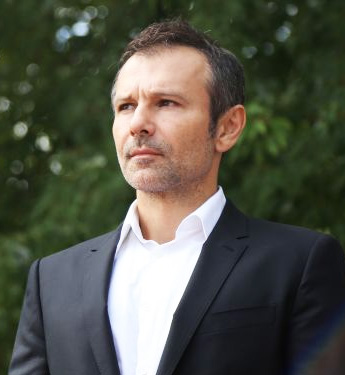
Svyatoslav Vakarchuk (2013–2016, 2022)

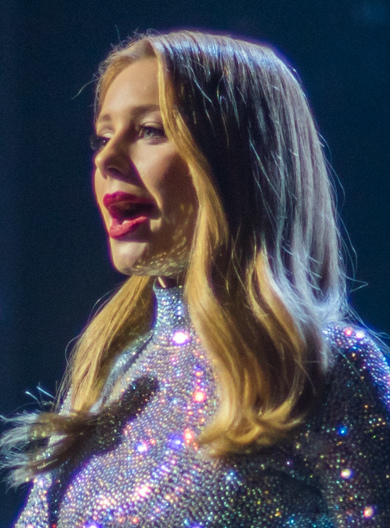
Tina Karol (2013, 2015–2021, 2026–)

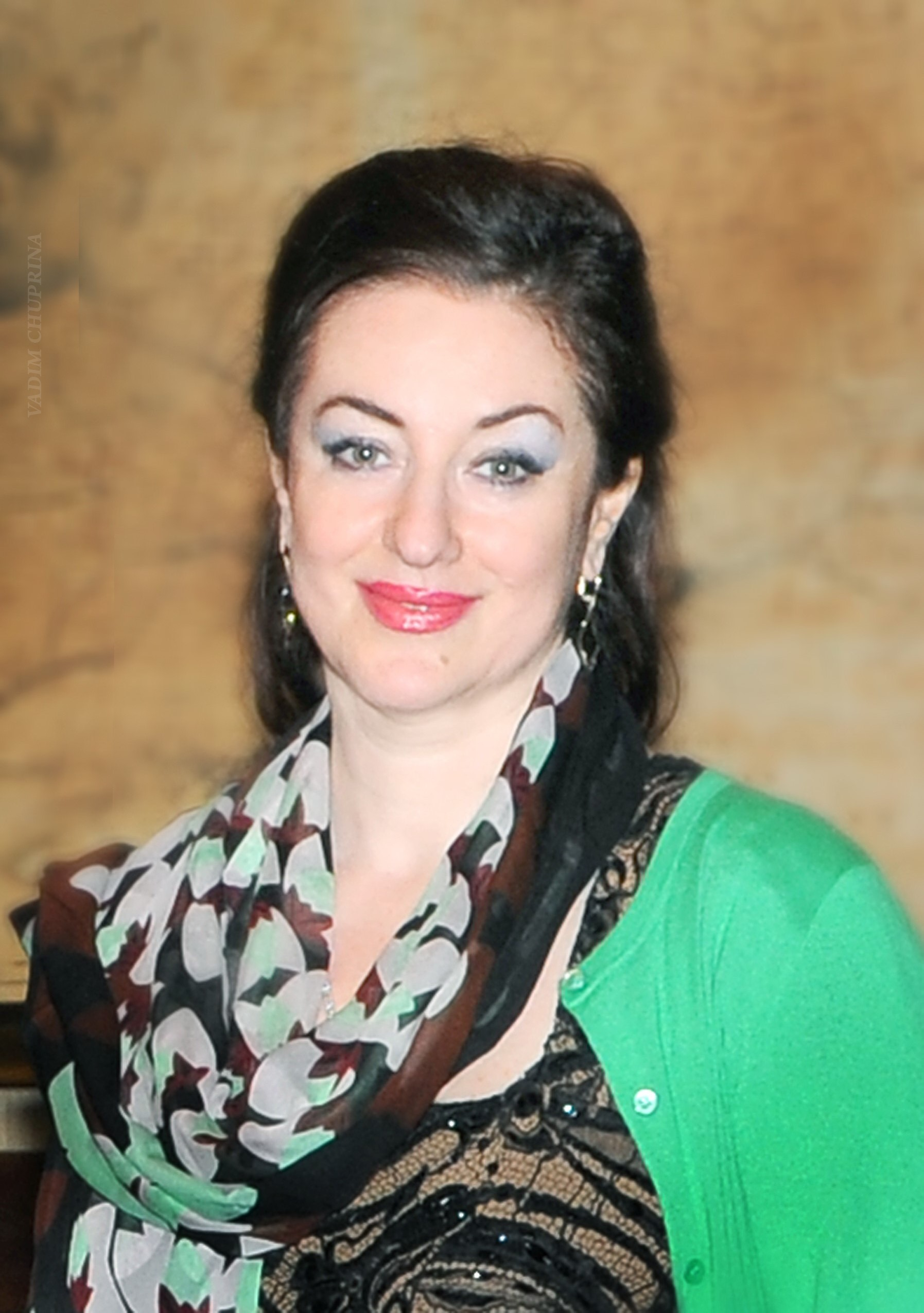
Tamara Gverdtsiteli (2014)

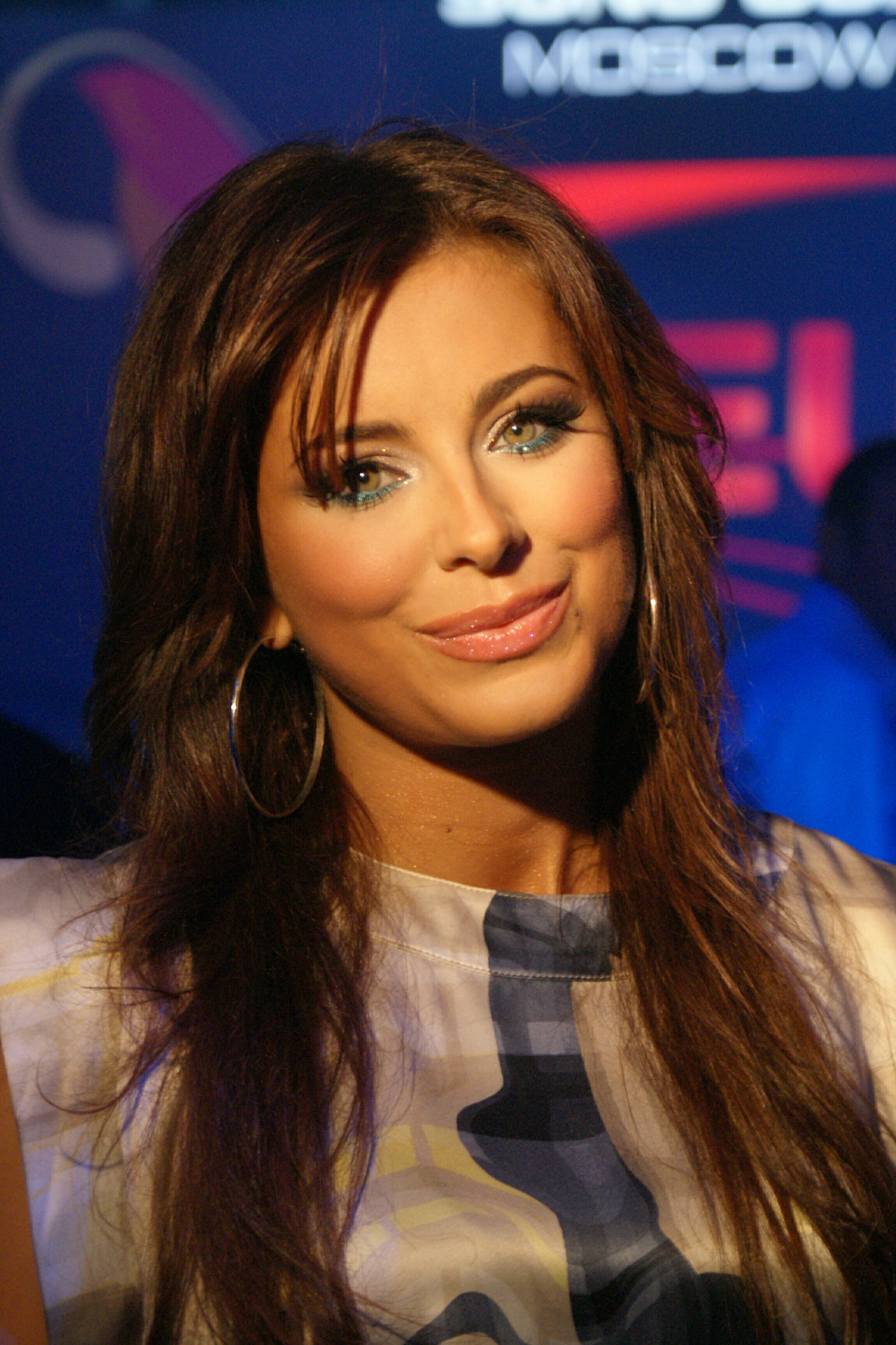
Ani Lorak (2014)

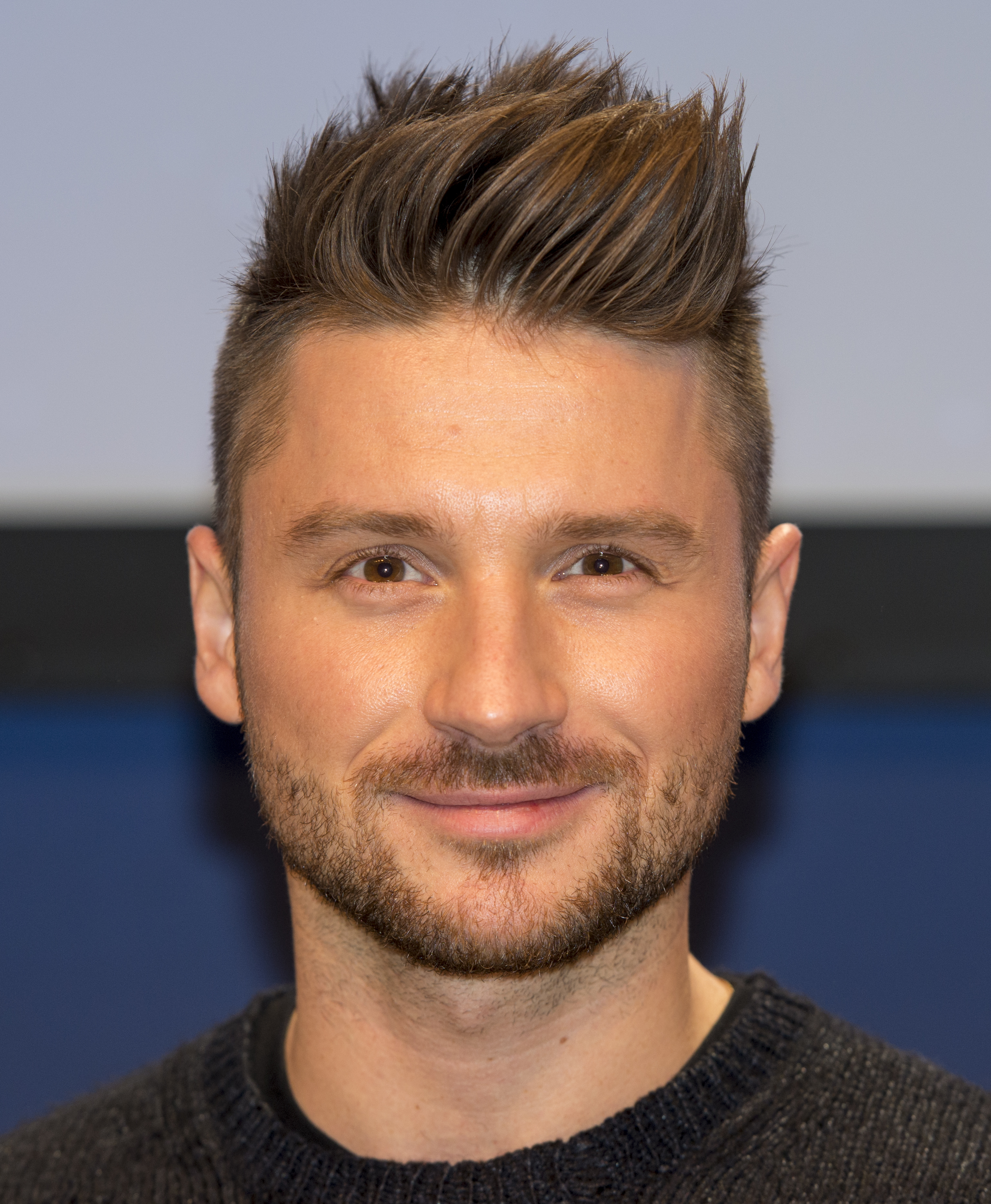
Sergey Lazarev (2014)

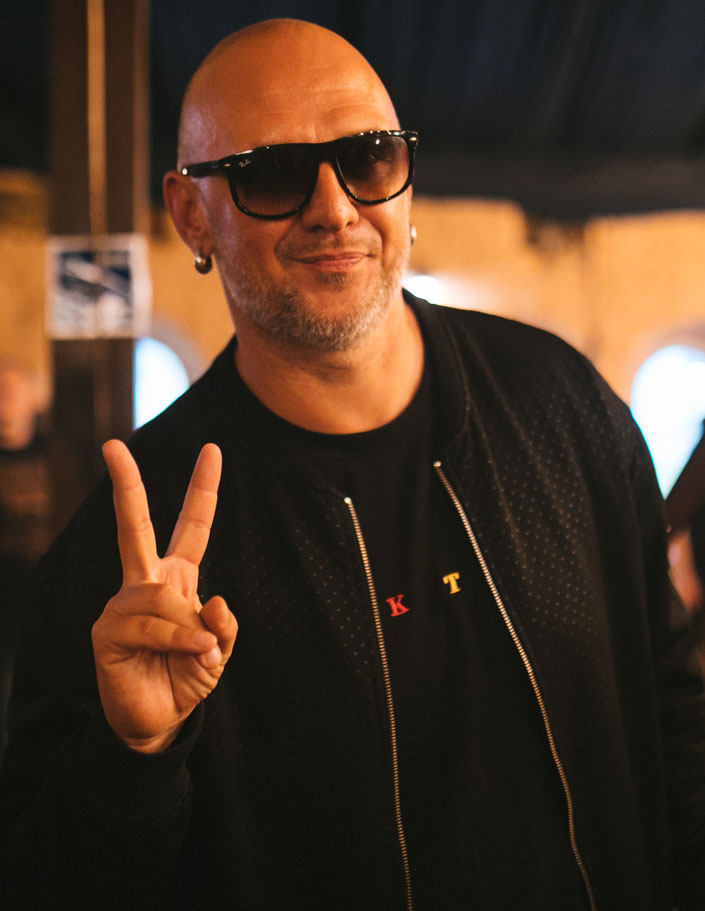
Potap (solo: 2015–2019, 2022; duo: 2020)

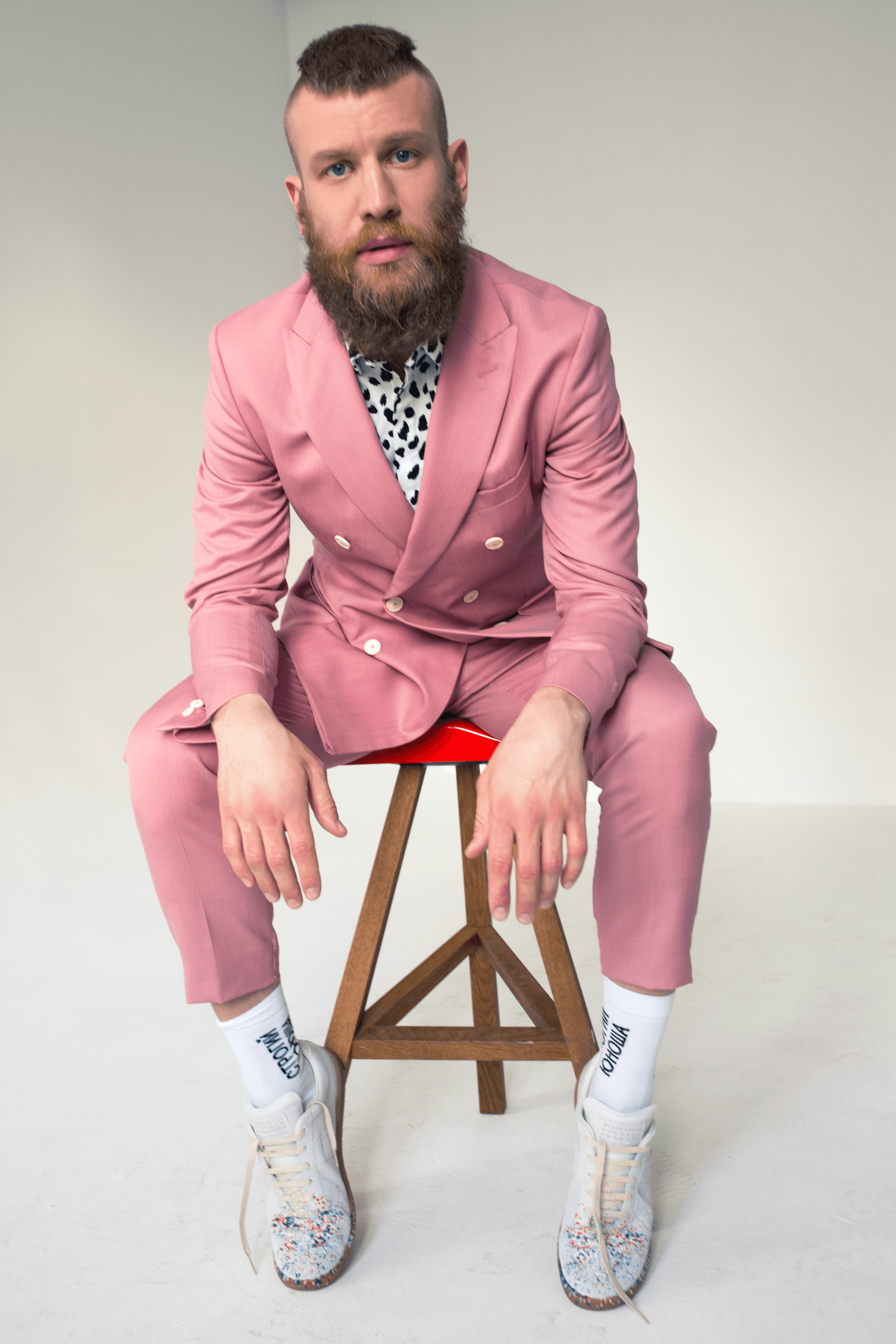
Ivan Dorn (2016)

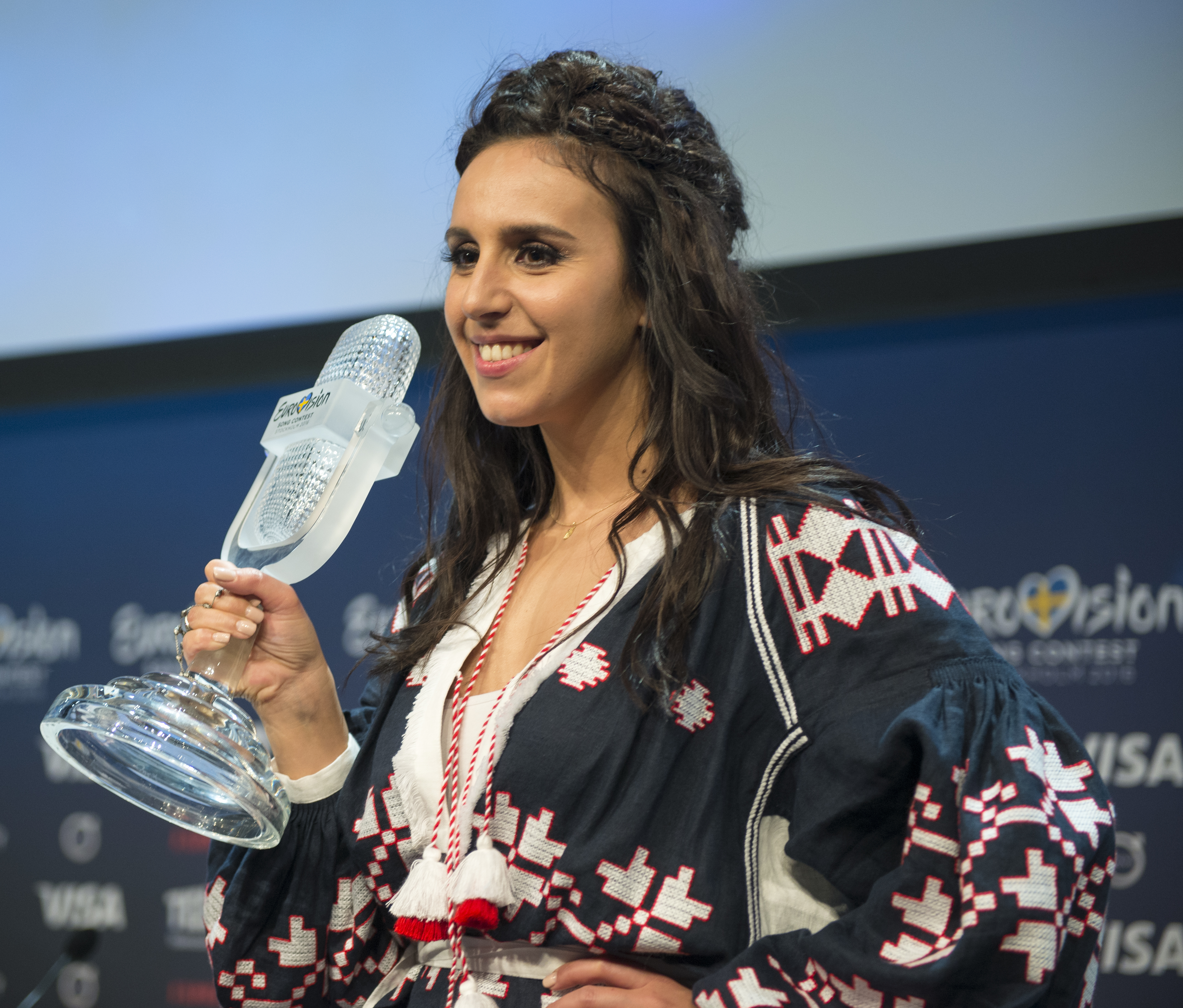
Jamala (2017–2018)

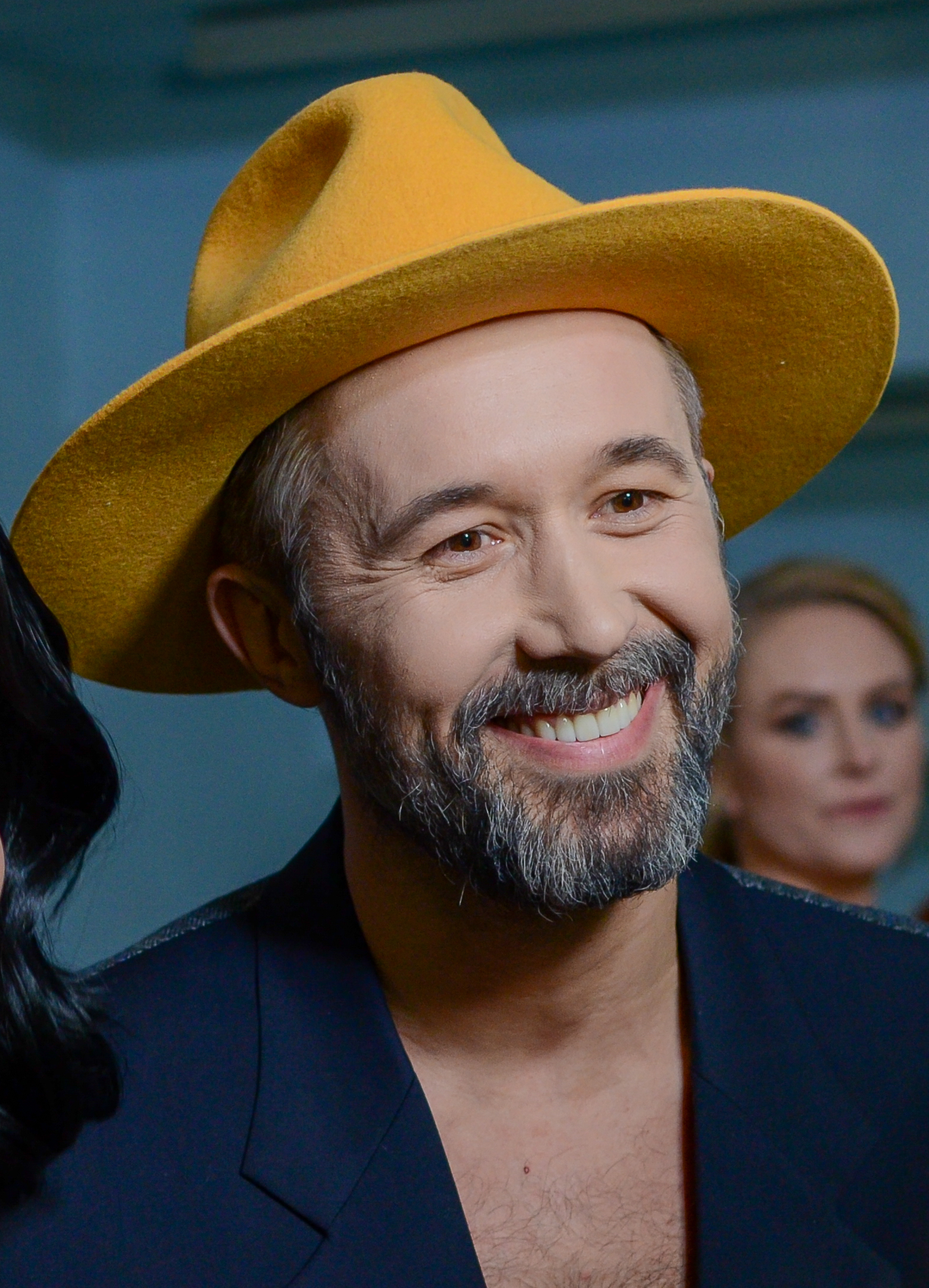
Serhii Babkin (2017–2018)

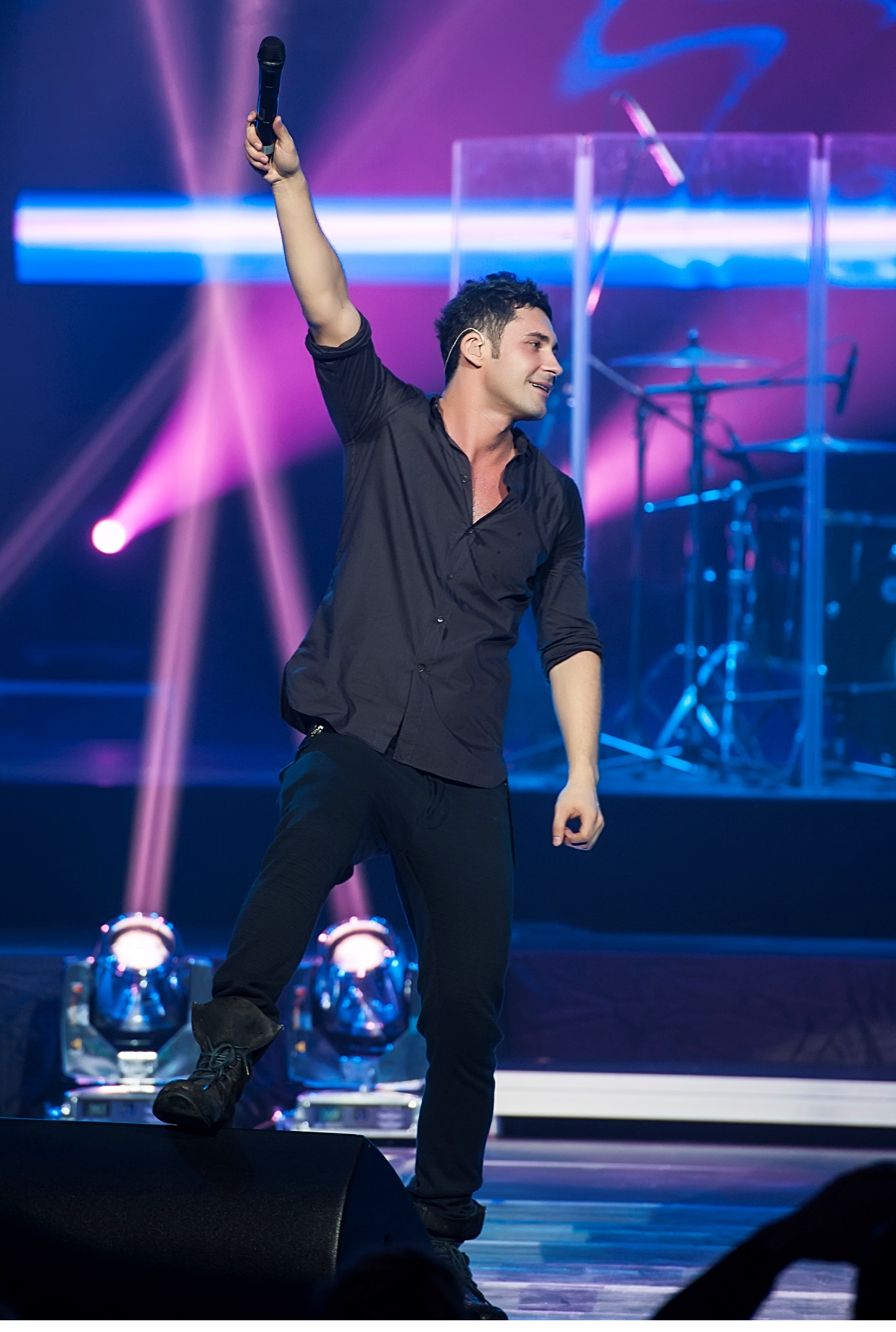
Dan Balan (2019–2020)

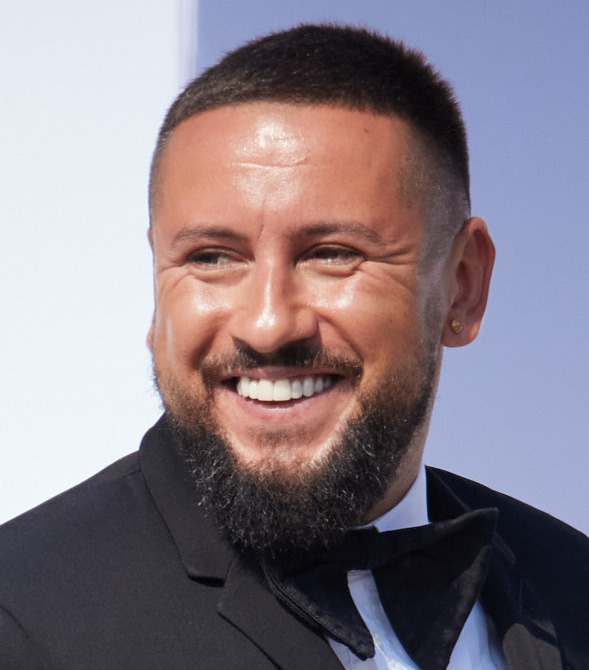
MONATIK (2019–2021, 2026–)

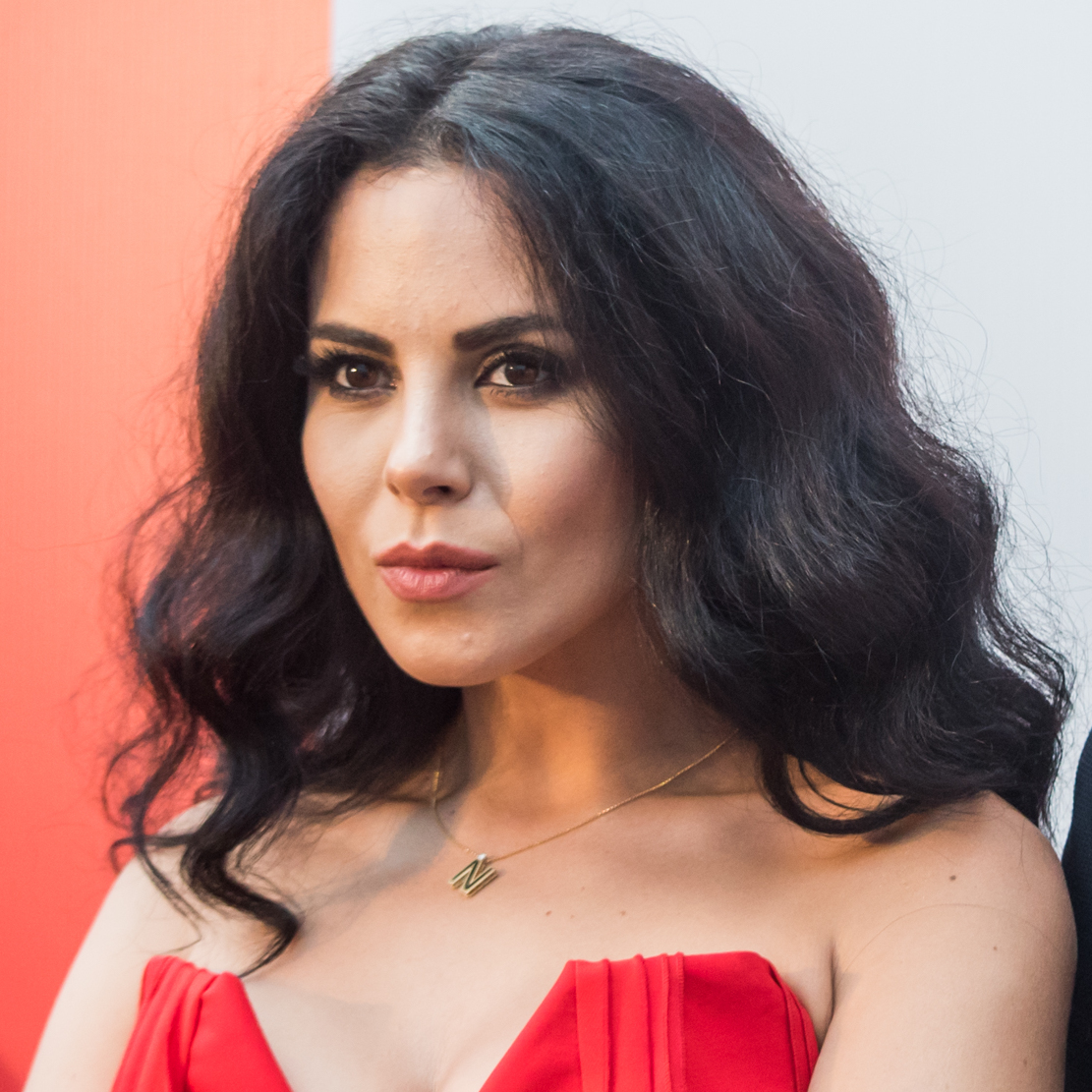
NK (duo: 2020)

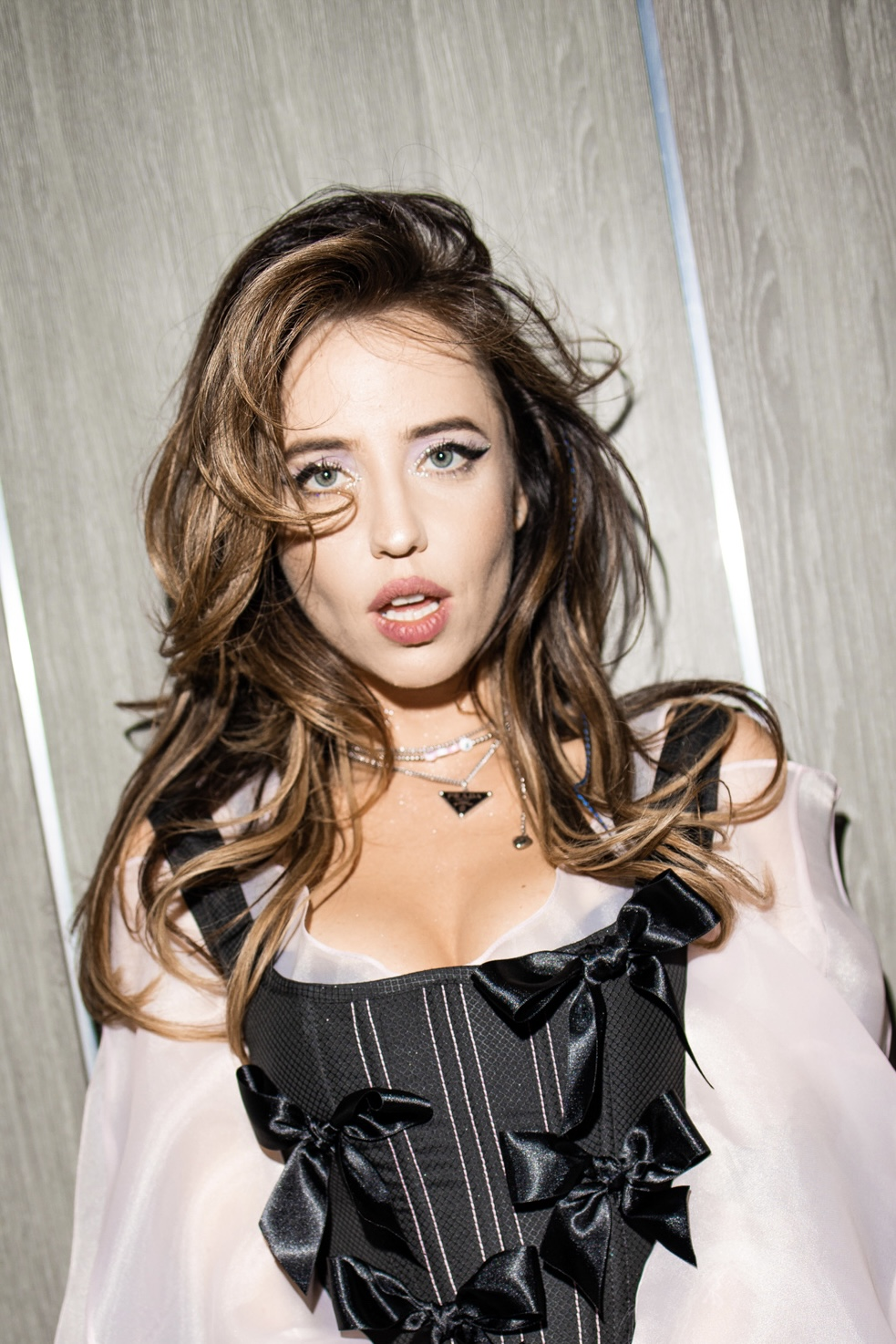
DOROFEEVA (2021–2023)

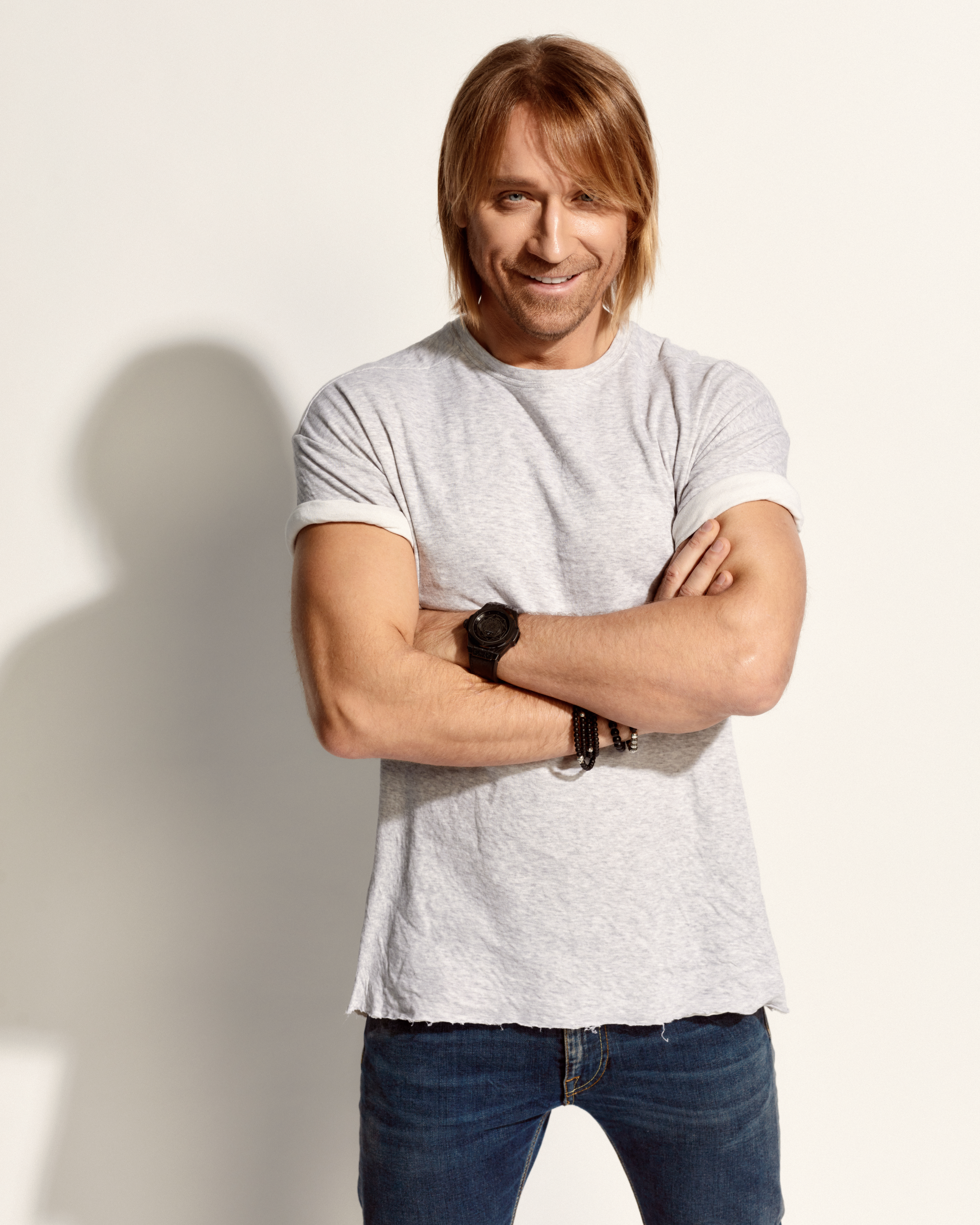
Olegg Vynnyk (2021)

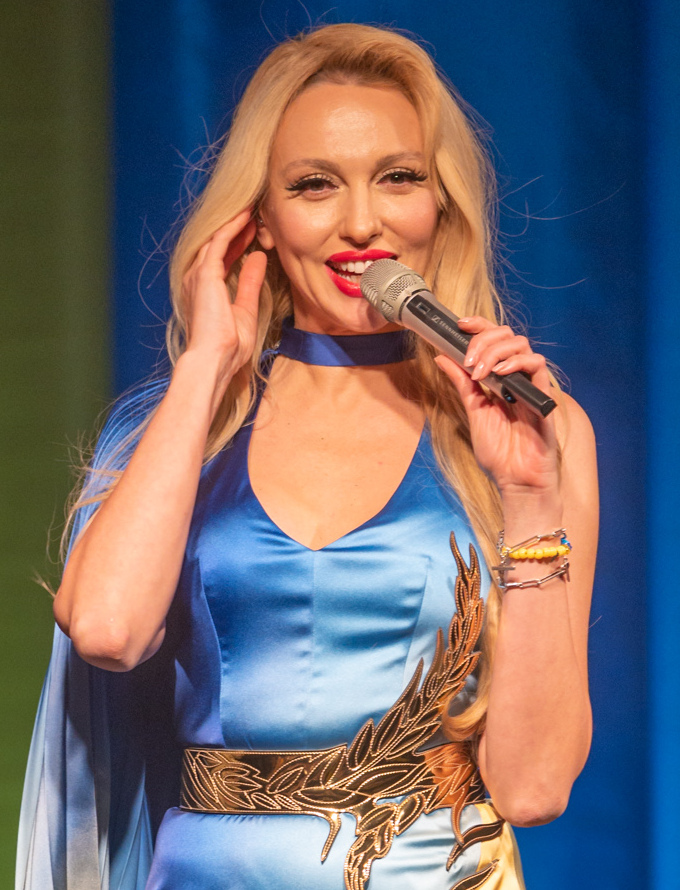
Olya Polyakova (2022)

Andriy Matsola (duo: 2022)

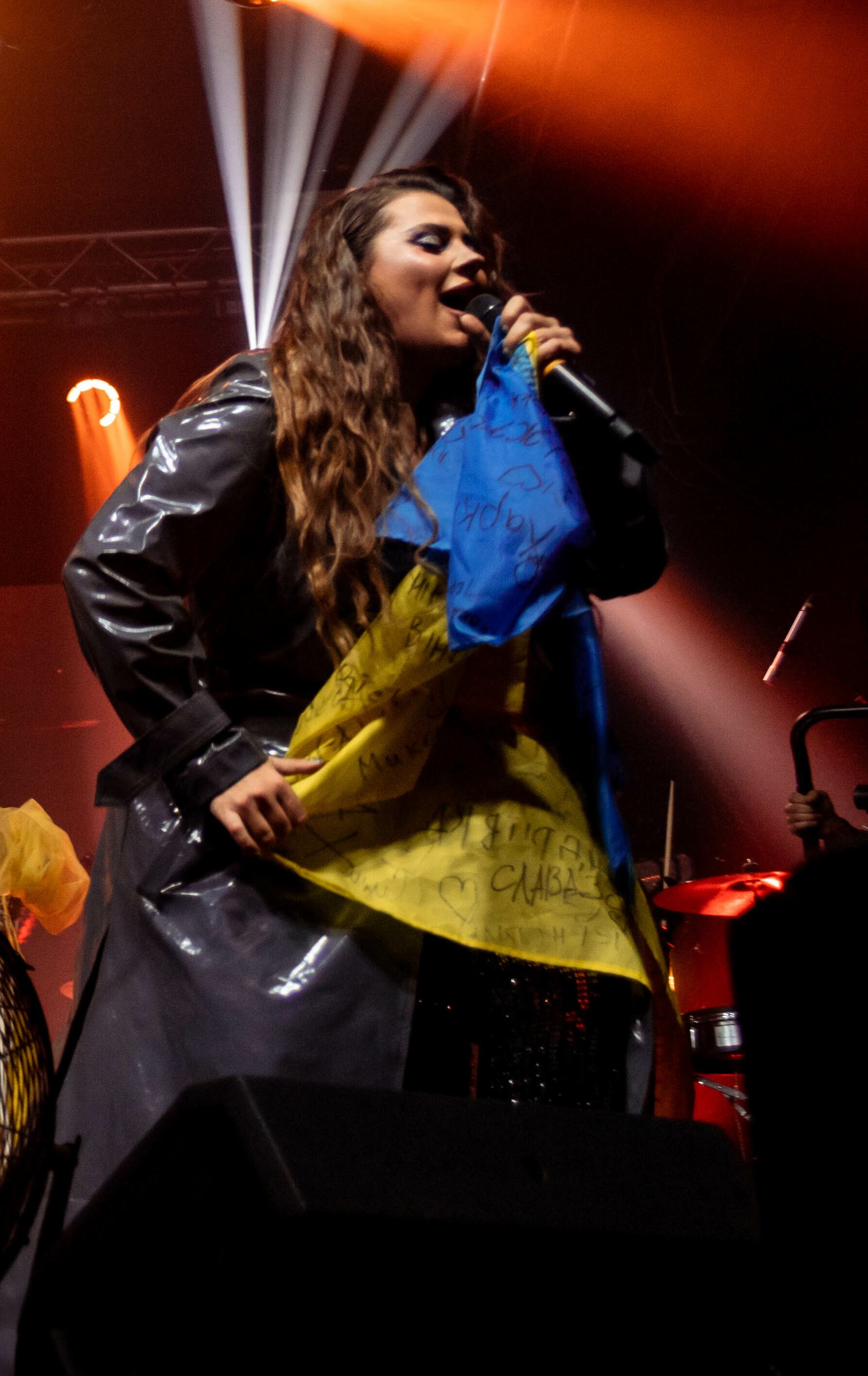
Oleksandra Zarits'ka (duo: 2022)

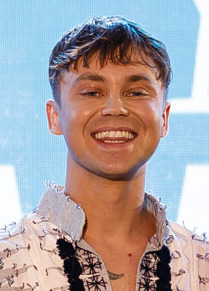
Artem Pyvovarov (2023–)

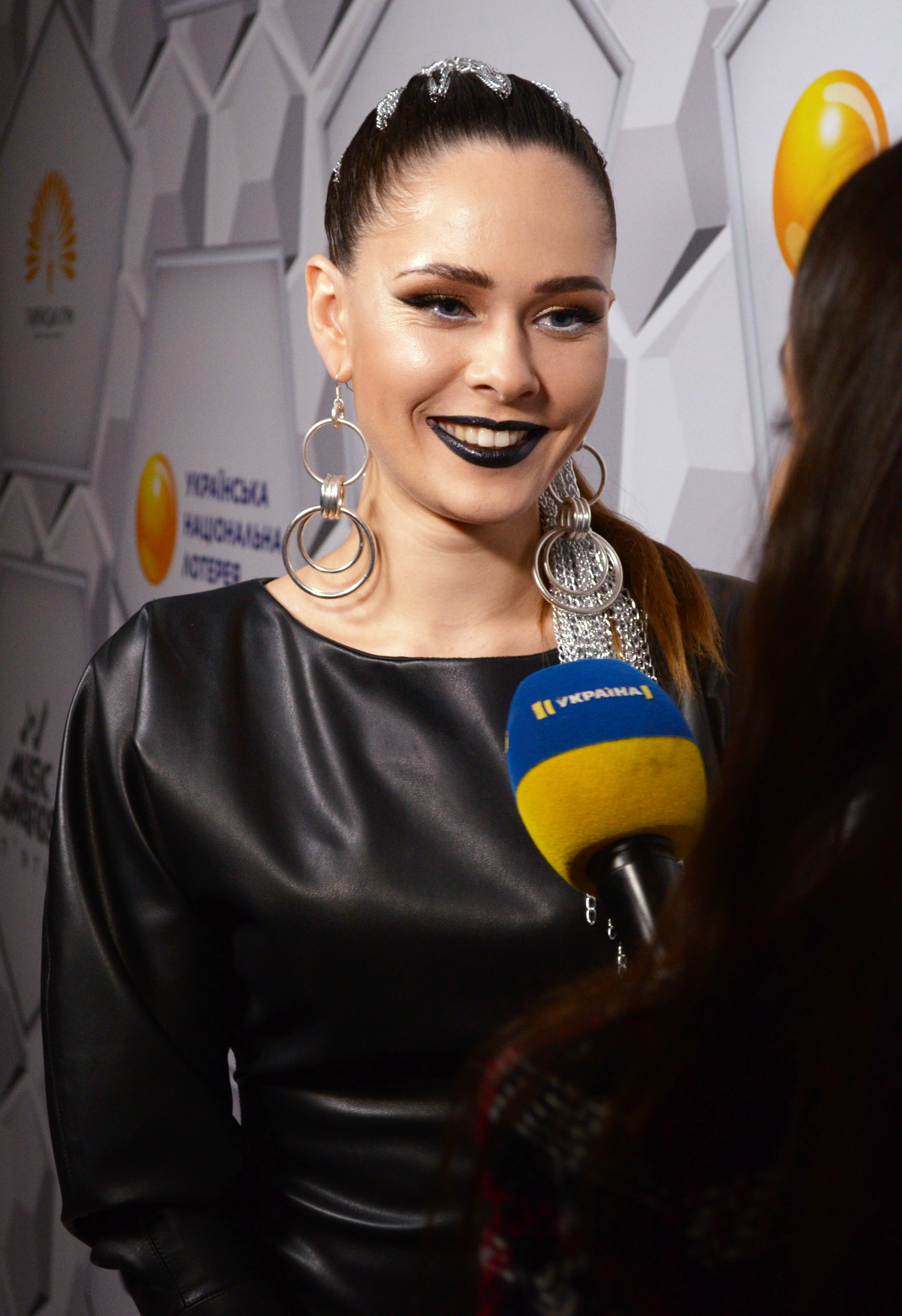
Julia Sanina (2023)

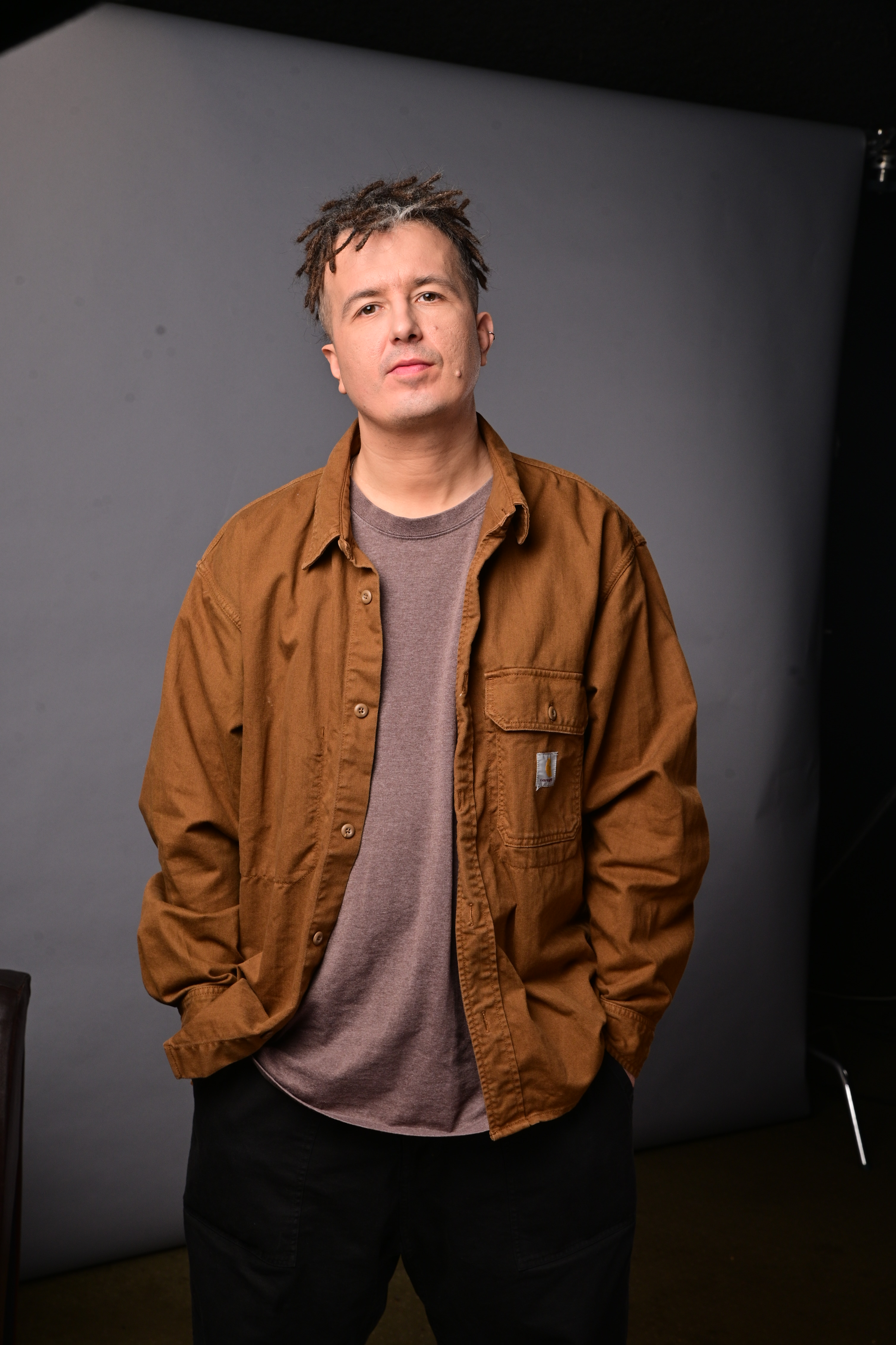
Ivan Klymenko (2023)

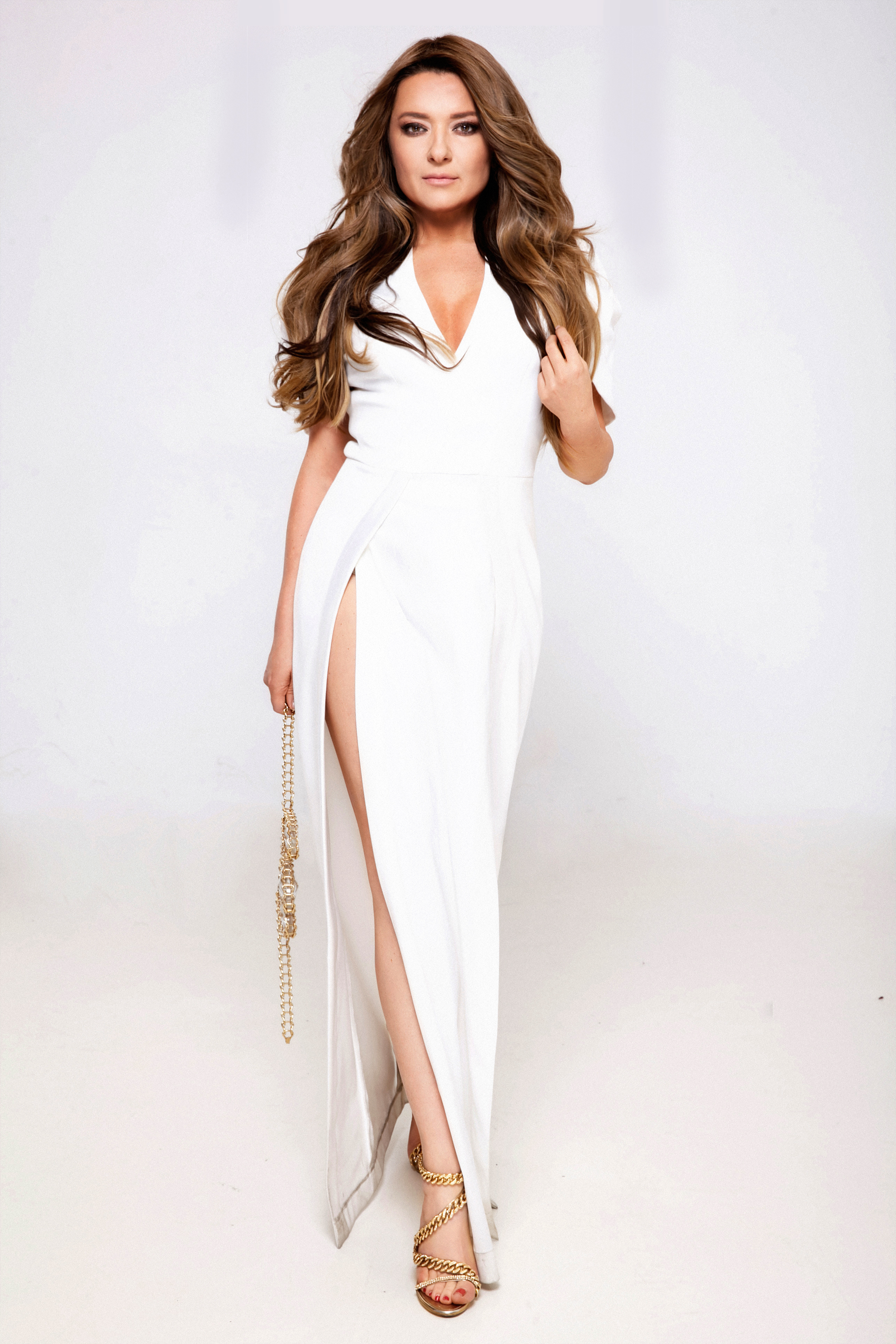
Natalia Mohylevska (2026–)

=== Line-up ===
Coaches' line-up by chairs order
Season	Year	Coaches			
Season	Year	1	2	3	4
1	2011	Ruslana	Stas	Diana	Oleksandr
2	2012	Oleh S	Diana	Oleksandr	Valeriya
3	2013	Oleh S	Svyatoslav	Tina	Oleksandr
4	2014	Svyatoslav	Tamara	Ani Lorak	Sergey
5	2015	Svyatoslav	Tina	Potap	Oleksandr
6	2016	Svyatoslav	Tina	Potap	Ivan D.
7	2017	Tina	Potap	Jamala	Serhiy
8	2018	Tina	Potap	Jamala	Serhiy
9	2019	Dan	Tina	Monatik	Potap
10	2020	Dan	Tina	Monatik	PTP & NK
11	2021	Tina	Oleh V.	Dorofeeva	Monatik
12	2022	Svyatoslav	Dorofeeva	Potap	Olya
13	2023	Ivan K.	Dorofeeva	Pyvovarov	Julia
14	2026	Pyvovarov	Tina	Natalia	Monatik

== Presenters ==
Presenters gallery

Andriy Domansʹkyy (2011–2013)

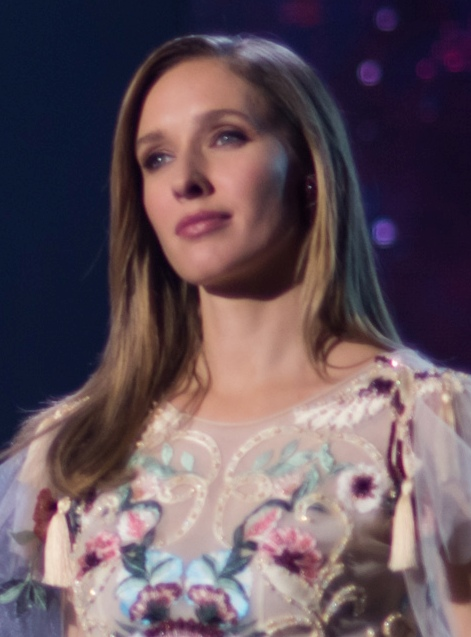
Kateryna Osadcha (2011–2013, 2016–present)

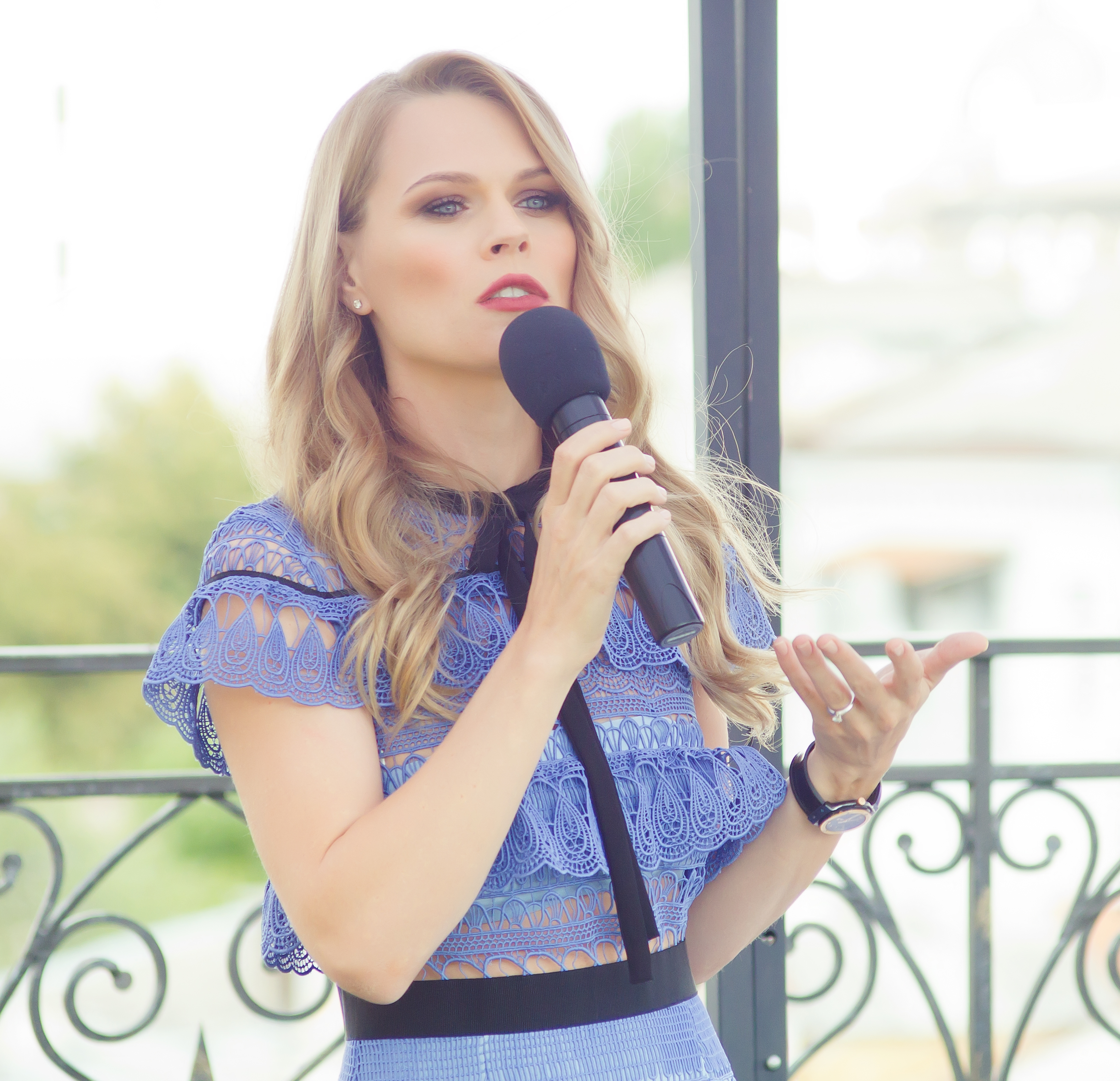
Olʹha Freymut (2014–2015)

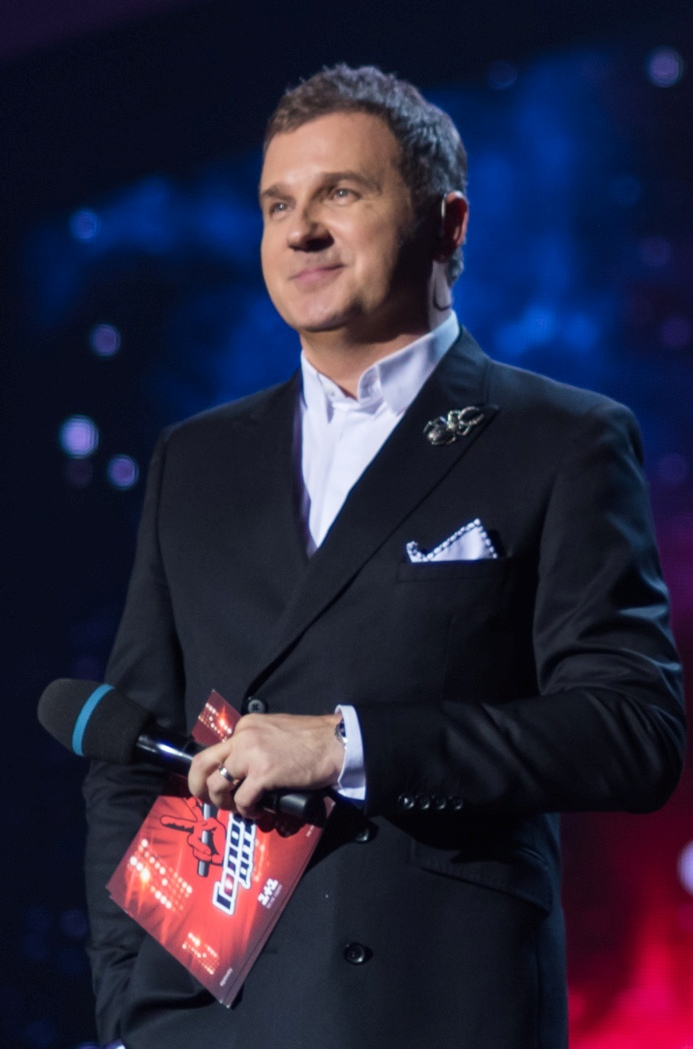
Yuriy Horbunov (2015–present)

== Season synopses ==
=== Season 1 ===
==== Elimination Chart ====
Color Key
Team Alexander
Team Diana
Team Ruslana
Team Stas
Artist was saved by the public
Artist was saved by the coach
Artist advanced to the finals
Artist was eliminated

Contestant	Week 1	Week 2	Week 3	Week 4	Semi-Final	Final	
Contestant	Week 1	Week 2	Week 3	Week 4	Semi-Final	Top 4	Top 2
Ivan Hanzera	Safe	Safe	Safe	Safe	Safe (161.84%)	Safe (31.67%)	Winner (56%)
Antonina Matviienko	Safe	Safe	Safe	Safe	Safe (117.93%)	Safe (25.95%)	Runner-up (44%)
Vladyslav Sytnyk	Safe	Safe	Safe	Safe	Safe (120.78%)	Eliminated (23.76%)	3rd Place
Arsen Mirzoian	Safe	Safe	Safe	Safe	Safe (101.97%)	Eliminated (18.62%)	4th Place
Mila Nitich	Safe	Safe	Safe	Safe	Eliminated (98.03%)	5th to 8th Place	
Vasyl Lohay	Safe	Safe	Safe	Safe	Eliminated (82.07%)	5th to 8th Place	
Kateryna Hrachova	Safe	Safe	Safe	Safe	Eliminated (79.22%)	5th to 8th Place	
Natalia Hordiienko	Safe	Safe	Safe	Safe	Eliminated (38.16%)	5th to 8th Place	
Serhiy Yurchenko	Safe	Safe	Safe	Eliminated	9th to 12th place		
Yevheniia Chervonozhko	Safe	Safe	Safe	Eliminated	9th to 12th place		
Daria Mineieva	Safe	Safe	Safe	Eliminated	9th to 12th place		
Stanislav Konkin	Safe	Safe	Safe	Eliminated	9th to 12th place		
Lika Buhaiova	Safe	Safe	Eliminated	13th to 16th Place			
Eshtar Radi	Safe	Safe	Eliminated	13th to 16th Place			
Iryna Poyzen	Safe	Safe	Eliminated	13th to 16th Place			
Olha Shanis	Safe	Safe	Eliminated	13th to 16th Place			
Artem Vereshchaka	Safe	Eliminated	17th to 20th Place				
Tasha Kruz	Safe	Eliminated	17th to 20th Place				
Alina Bashkina	Safe	Eliminated	17th to 20th Place				
Oleksiy Martynenko	Safe	Eliminated	17th to 20th Place				
Dmytro Ivashchenko	Eliminated	21 to 24th Places					
Roman Stokolos	Eliminated	21 to 24th Places					
Dmytro Teimurazov	Eliminated	21 to 24th Places					
Volodymyr Okilko	Eliminated	21 to 24th Places					

=== Season 7 ===
==== Elimination Chart ====
Color Key
Team Karol
Team Babkin
Team Potap
Team Jamala
Artist was saved by the public
Artist was saved by the coach
Artist advanced to the finals
Artist was eliminated

Contestant	Week 1	Week 2	Week 3		
Contestant	Week 1	Week 2	Top 4	Top 3	Top 2
Aleksander Klimenko	Safe	Safe (138%)	Safe	Safe	Winner
Ingret Kostenko	Safe	Safe (114%)	Safe	Safe	Runner-up
Vera Kekeliya	Safe	Safe (105%)	Safe	Eliminated	3rd Place
Anna Kuksа	Safe	Safe (104%)	Eliminated	4th Place	
Naile Ibraimova	Safe	Eliminated (96%)	5th-8th Place		
Marta Adamchuck	Safe	Eliminated (95%)	5th-8th Place		
Roman Rusyi	Safe	Eliminated (85%)	5th-8th Place		
Katya Chilly	Safe	Eliminated (62%)	5th-8th Place		
Roman Duda	Eliminated	9th-16th Place			
Yehor Sharankov	Eliminated	9th-16th Place			
Vladyslav Byelik	Eliminated	9th-16th Place			
Nini Tsnobiladze	Eliminated	9th-16th Place			
Yana Blinder	Eliminated	9th-16th Place			
Olha Bohatyrenko	Eliminated	9th-16th Place			
Halyna Shkoda	Eliminated	9th-16th Place			
Anastasia Malashkevych	Eliminated	9th-16th Place			

==== Semifinal ====
Coach	Order	Artist	Song	Coach's vote (/100%)	Public's vote (/100%)	Votes' summa	Result
Serhii Babkin	1	Marta Adamchuck	"Зiронька"	45%	50%	95%	Eliminated
Serhii Babkin	2	Vera Kekelia	"Запроси мене у сни"	55%	50%	105%	Advanced to the Final
Jamala	3	Naile Ibraimova	"Feel"/"Bizim Taraf"	51%	45%	96%	Eliminated
Jamala	4	Anna Kuksа	"Шаленiй"	49%	55%	104%	Advanced to the Final
Potap	5	Roman Rusyi	"«Где-то далеко"	49%	36%	85%	Eliminated
Potap	6	Ingret Kostenko	"Коханий"	51%	64%	114%	Advanced to the Final
Tina Karol	7	Katya Chilly	"Яблiнька"	55%	7%	62%	Eliminated
Tina Karol	8	Aleksander Klimenko	"Достойно есть. Аксион эстин"	45%	93%	138%	Advanced to the Final

==== Final ====
Coach	Artist	Order	Solo Song (no.1)	Order	Duet Song (with Coach)	Order	Solo Song (no.2)	Result
Serhii Babkin	Vera Kekelia	1	"Майже весна"	5	"Вставай сонце"	Eliminated		Third Place
Jamala	Anna Kuksa	2	"Верше, мiй верше"	Eliminated				Fourth Place
Potap	Ingret Kostenko	3	"Несе Галя воду"	6	"Менуети"	8	"Пташечка"	Runner-up
Tina Karol	Aleksander Klimenko	4	"Чорнобривцi"	7	"Твоï грiхи"	9	"Мамина любов"	Winner

=== Season 8 ===
==== Elimination Chart ====
Color Key
Team Karol
Team Babkin
Team Potap
Team Jamala
Artist was saved by the public
Artist was saved by the coach
Artist advanced to the finals
Artist was eliminated

Contestant	Week 1	Week 2	Week 3		
Contestant	Week 1	Week 2	Top 4	Top 3	Top 2
Elena Lutsenko	Safe	Safe (115%)	Safe	Safe	Winner
Andriy Rybarchuk	Safe	Safe (126%)	Safe	Safe	Runner-up
Anna Trincher	Safe	Safe (114%)	Safe	Eliminated	3rd Place
Srbuhi Sargsyan	Safe	Safe (129%)	Eliminated	4th Place	
Kristina Khramova	Safe	Eliminated (86%)	5th-8th Place		
Dmitry Samko	Safe	Eliminated (85%)	5th-8th Place		
Mikhail Sosunov	Safe	Eliminated (74%)	5th-8th Place		
Nikita Trondin	Safe	Eliminated (71%)	5th-8th Place		
Valentin Belenky	Eliminated	9th-16th Place			
Alexander Chekmaryov	Eliminated	9th-16th Place			
Violetta Litvinenko	Eliminated	9th-16th Place			
Ziangja	Eliminated	9th-16th Place			
Arsen Vitrecki	Eliminated	9th-16th Place			
Adriana Shevchuk	Eliminated	9th-16th Place			
Olena Karas	Eliminated	9th-16th Place			
Nude Voices	Eliminated	9th-16th Place			

==== Semifinal ====
Coach	Order	Artist	Song	Coach's vote (/100%)	Public's vote (/100%)	Votes' summa	Result
Tina Karol	1	Mikhail Sosunov	"Cry Me a River"	51%	23%	74%	Eliminated
Tina Karol	2	Andriy Rybarchuk	"Chandelier"	49%	77%	126%	Advanced to the Final
Jamala	3	Anna Trincher	"Не питай мене"	40%	74%	114%	Advanced to the Final
Jamala	4	Kristina Khramova	"Heaven"	60%	26%	86%	Eliminated
Potap	5	Srbuhi Sargsyan	"Run to You"	60%	69%	129%	Advanced to the Final
Potap	6	Nikita Trondin	"Квiтка"	40%	31%	71%	Eliminated
Serhii Babkin	7	Dmitry Samko	"Романс"	43%	42%	85%	Eliminated
Serhii Babkin	8	Elena Lutsenko	"Минає день, минає ніч"	57%	58%	115%	Advanced to the Final

==== Final ====
Coach	Artist	Order	Solo Song (no.1)	Order	Duet Song (with Coach)	Order	Solo Song (no.2)	Result
Potap	Srbuhi Sargsyan	1	"Human"	Eliminated				Fourth Place
Tina Karol	Andriy Rybarchuk	2	"Ніч яка місячна"	7	"Космiчнi почуття"	8	"Закрили твої очі"	Runner-up
Jamala	Anna Trincher	3	Candyman"	6	"Crazy in Love"	Eliminated		Third Place
Serhii Babkin	Elena Lutsenko	4	"Ой, у вишневому саду"	5	"Червона рута"	9	"Колискова зорі"	Winner

=== Season 9 ===
==== Elimination Chart ====
Color Key
Team Tina
Team Dan
Team Potap
Team MONATIK
Artist was saved by the public
Artist was saved by the coach
Artist advanced to the finals
Artist was eliminated

Contestant	Week 1	Week 2	Week 3		
Contestant	Week 1	Week 2	Top 4	Top 3	Top 2
Oksana Mukha	Safe	Safe (141%)	Safe	Safe	Winner
Karyna Arsentyeva	Safe	Safe (111%)	Safe	Safe	Runner-up
Andriy Khayat	Safe	Safe (119%)	Safe	Eliminated	3rd Place
Victoria Oliynyk	Safe	Safe (106%)	Eliminated	4th Place	
Andrei Karpov	Safe	Eliminated (94%)	5th-8th Place		
Victoria Yagich	Safe	Eliminated (89%)	5th-8th Place		
David Axelrod	Safe	Eliminated (81%)	5th-8th Place		
Haitham Mohammed Rafi	Safe	Eliminated (59%)	5th-8th Place		
Catherine Bega	Eliminated	9th-16th Place			
Vyacheslav Kretov	Eliminated	9th-16th Place			
Alina Podluzhnaya	Eliminated	9th-16th Place			
Vladislav and Roman Tarantsovym	Eliminated	9th-16th Place			
Bohdana Renk	Eliminated	9th-16th Place			
Arensy Zhuravel	Eliminated	9th-16th Place			
Ksenia Bahchalova	Eliminated	9th-16th Place			
Nika Tupilko	Eliminated	9th-16th Place			

==== Semifinal ====
Coach	Order	Artist	Song	Coach's vote (/100%)	Public's vote (/100%)	Votes' summa	Result
Dan Balan	1	Oksana Mukha	"Два кольори"	51%	90%	141%	Advanced to the Final
Dan Balan	2	Haitham Rafi	"Seven Nation Army"	49%	10%	59%	Eliminated
Potap	3	Karyna Arsentyeva	"I Have Nothing"	51%	60%	111%	Advanced to the Final
Potap	4	Victoria Yagich	"Цвiте терен"	49%	40%	89%	Eliminated
MONATIK	5	Victoria Oliynyk	"Соколята"	51%	55%	106%	Advanced to the Final
MONATIK	6	Andriy Karpov	"Still Got the Blues (For You)"	49%	45%	94%	Eliminated
Tina Karol	7	David Axelrod	"Минає день, минає ніч"	49%	32%	81%	Eliminated
Tina Karol	8	Andriy Khayat	"Плакала"	51%	68%	119%	Advanced to the Final

==== Final ====
Coach	Artist	Order	Solo Song (no.1)	Order	Duet Song (with Coach)	Order	Solo Song (no.2)	Result
Dan Balan	Oksana Mukha	1	"Я піду в далекі гори"	6	"Треба"	9	"Де ти тепер"	Winner
MONATIK	Victoria Oliynyk	2	"Digitalization"/"Show Me Your Love"/"Funny Love"	Eliminated				Fourth Place
Potap	Karyna Arsentyeva	3	"Чекай"	5	"Shallow"	8	"I Will Always Love You"	Runner-up
Tina Karol	Andriy Khayat	4	"Весна"	7	"Ніч яка місячна"	Eliminated		Third Place
