= Andriy Matsola =

Ukrainian brewer and philanthropist

Matsola Andriy Mykolayovych (born 4 August 1977, in Lviv) is a Ukrainian brewer, founder, owner and head of supervisory board of "Persha pryvatna brovarnya", a philanthropist, and a public figure.

== Biography ==
=== Education ===
He has a degree in economics. He graduated from Lviv college of finance and credit, and from Ternopyl academy of agriculture in 2001, and has a master's degree in "International economics". He is a student of Kyiv theological academy since 2012.

=== Professional experience ===
He founded a distribution company named "Olmar" in 1998, which became one of the biggest beer distributing companies in western Ukraine in the middle of 2000. In 2002 he built a small experimental factory "Halytskiy brovar". In 2004 together with his family he has established "Persha pryvatna brovarnya". In 2007 "Persha pryvatna brovarnya" under the supervision of Andriy Matsola has become a participant of energy conservation program for small and medium business UKEEP and have received first investments from European bank of reconstruction and development in sum of 17,6 million USD. In 2012 EBRD together with German concern OETTINGER and OASIS CIS international group have entered to become the shareholders of the company.

Andriy Matsola is still the biggest shareholder of "Persha pryvatna brovarnya" and its executive director (CEO).

== Social activity ==
Since 2015 Andriy Matsola is the participant of "21st of November" initiative, the goal of which is actualization and generalization of values of modern Ukrainians.

=== Church and education support ===
- Annually, under support of Andriy Matsola students of Kyiv and Volyn orthodox theological academies are forwarded to study in Aristotle University of Thessaloniki – the biggest educational institution of Greece.
- At the beginning of 2016 Andriy Matsola facilitated the appearance of Saint Sophia open orthodox university on the basis of Saint Sophia Cathedral national sanctuary.

=== Culture and art patronage ===
- In May 2016, under the initiative of Andriy Matsola, "Persha Pryvatna Brovarnya" was a partner of "Kyiv city day.Holiday of free people" festival, which was held in the capital on the occasion of Kyiv city day.
- In June 2016, Andriy Matsola facilitated the organization of Oleh Skrypka and his band's "Vopli Vidoplyasova" concert tour at the frontline of ATO (Donetsk region, Ukraine). The musicians have played three concerts for the soldiers near Selidove, Mar'ynka and Kostiantynivka.

=== Sponsorship of sport ===
- "Persha Pryvatna Brovarnya" is the official sponsor Biathlon federation of Ukraine since 2012.
- In 2015 Andriy Matsola had initiated to support the amateur sports in Ukraine.Today "Persha Pryvatna Brovarnya" company is the sponsor of the basketball team of "Kyiv-Mohyla Academy" University and football team "Katandzaro".

=== Partnership projects ===
In 2015 ,"1+1" TV channel and Persha pryvatna brovarnya launched a multimedia educating project called Moya krayina. Prekrasna I nezalezhna, which will show various locations Ukraine from a birds-eye view. Andriy Matsola, together with 1+1 TV channel, hosts Alla Mazur and other people are the faces of this project.

== Personal life ==
Married, parenting 4 sons.
