= Ukeep =

EBRD credit facility for Ukrainian energy-efficiency projects

UKEEP is a credit facility developed by the European Bank for Reconstruction and Development (EBRD), targeting Ukrainian private companies in all sectors looking to invest in energy efficiency or renewable energy projects. The UKEEP credit line is provided through participating banks in Ukraine, who in turn on-lend to Ukrainian private companies applying for UKEEP financing. Investments are anticipated to decrease energy consumption, increase own energy production or make energy usage more efficient.

UKEEP is active and is scheduled to run until the end of 2012. UKEEP has so far committed approximately US$102 million to energy efficiency projects in various sectors. Together, these projects will lead to energy savings of more than 2,115,000 MWh per year – equivalent to the household electricity consumption of more than 520,000 households. As a result, CO_{2} emissions will decrease by more than 504,000 tonnes per year – equivalent to the annual emissions of more than 225,000 passenger cars.

At company level the UKEEP concept has turned out to be very profitable with individual Ukrainian companies saving up to 85% of their energy consumption by investing in new and more energy efficient technologies. The success of UKEEP has resulted in EBRD launching similar concepts in several other Eastern European countries.

== See also ==
- The European Bank for Reconstruction and Development
- Efficient energy use
- Renewable energy
- Ukraine
