= Alyona Alyona =

Ukrainian rapper (born 1991)

Alyona Alyona Альона Альона
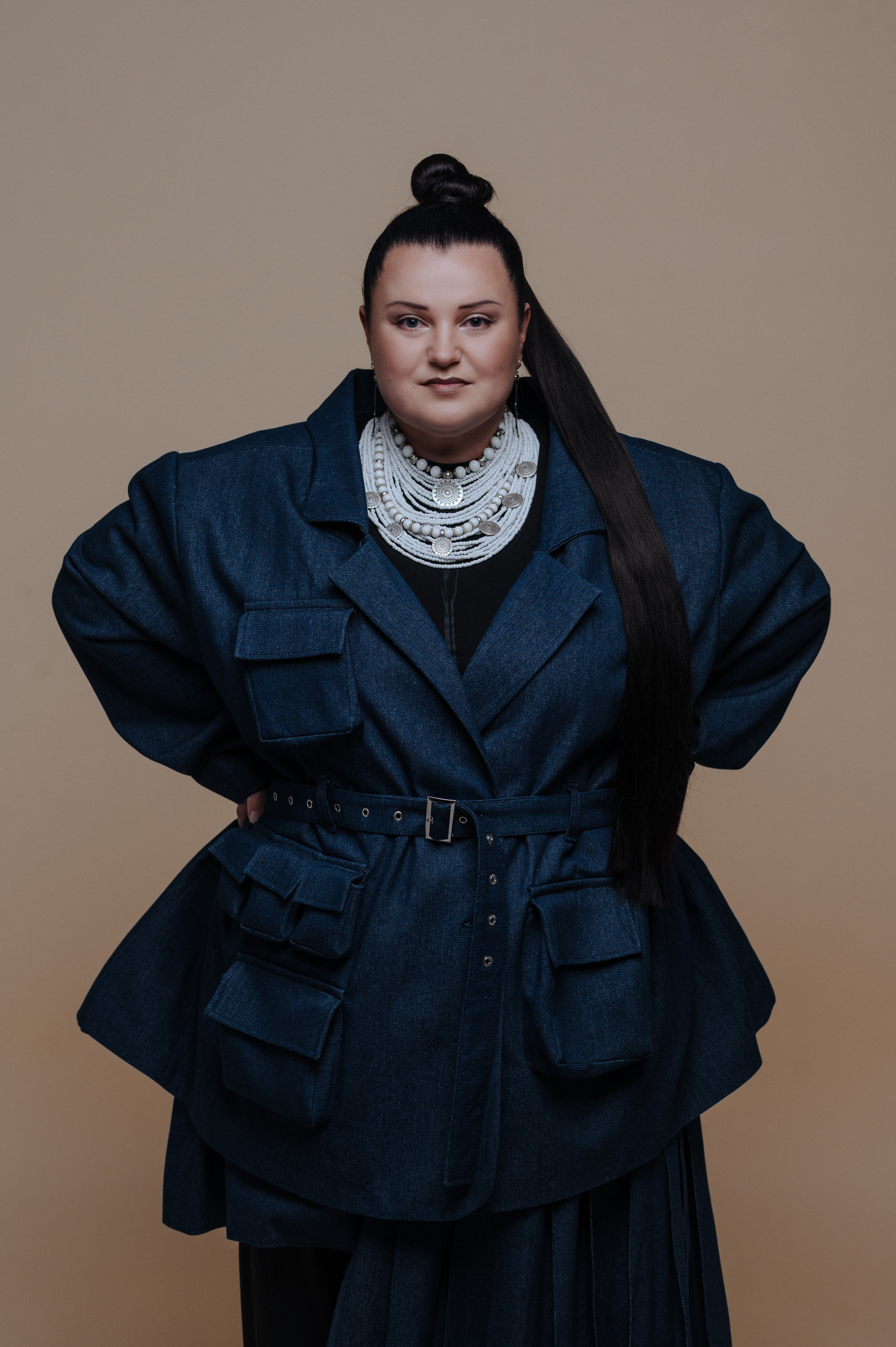
- Alyona in 2025

Background information
- Born: Aliona Olehivna Savranenko; 14 June 1991 (age 35); Kapitanivka, Kirovohrad Oblast, Ukrainian SSR, USSR
- Genres: Ukrainian hip hop; pop
- Occupations: Rapper; singer; songwriter
- Years active: 2018–present
- Label: Def Jam Polska

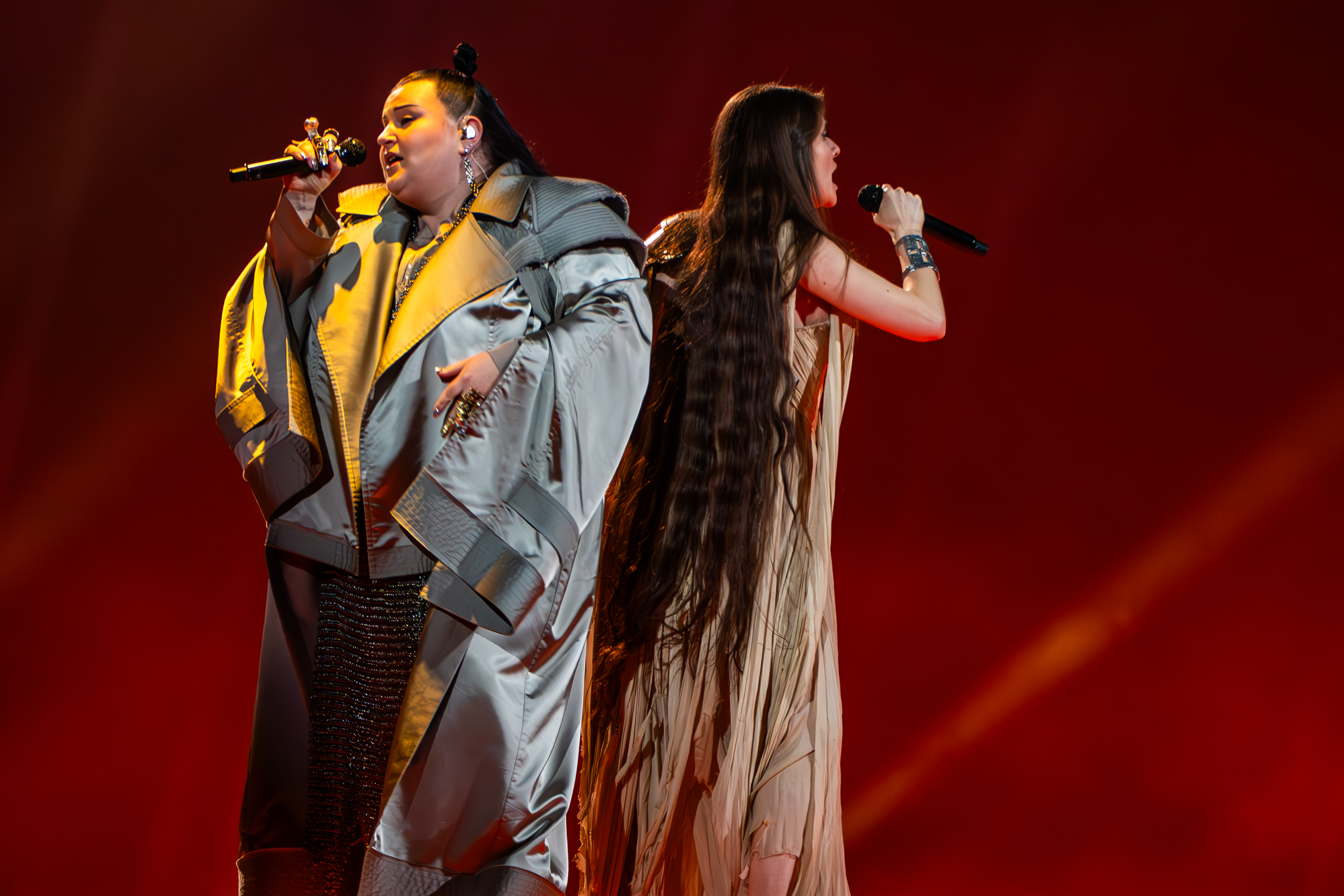
Performing at the Eurovision Song Contest 2024 with Jerry Heil

Aliona Olehivna Savranenko (Ukrainian: Альо́на Олегівна Савране́нко; born 14 June 1991), better known by her stage name Alyona Alyona (Ukrainian pronunciation: [ɐˈlʲɔnɐ ɐˈlʲɔnɐ]; stylized in all lowercase), is a Ukrainian rapper, singer, and songwriter. She released her debut album, Pushka (Пушка), in 2019, followed by an extended play the same year, V khati MA (В хаті МА).

Alyona has been dubbed "the new rap star of Ukraine" and "the sensation of Ukrainian rap" by Ukrainian media. In an article titled "15 European Pop Acts Who Matter Right Now", The New York Times likened her to Azealia Banks.

She and Jerry Heil represented Ukraine in the Eurovision Song Contest 2024 with the song "Teresa & Maria".

== Early life ==
Aliona Savranenko was born in the urban-type settlement of Kapitanivka, Novomyrhorod Raion, Kirovohrad Oblast. She is a Christian. She holds two bachelor's degrees, one of which comes from the Gregory Skovoroda Pedagogical State University of Pereiaslav. Before doing rap, she worked as a teacher at "Teremok" kindergarten of Baryshivka, Kyiv Oblast. She then headed the kindergarten of the neighboring village of Dernivka. In total, Savranenko worked for four years in kindergartens, and left the job once she gained popularity.

== Career ==
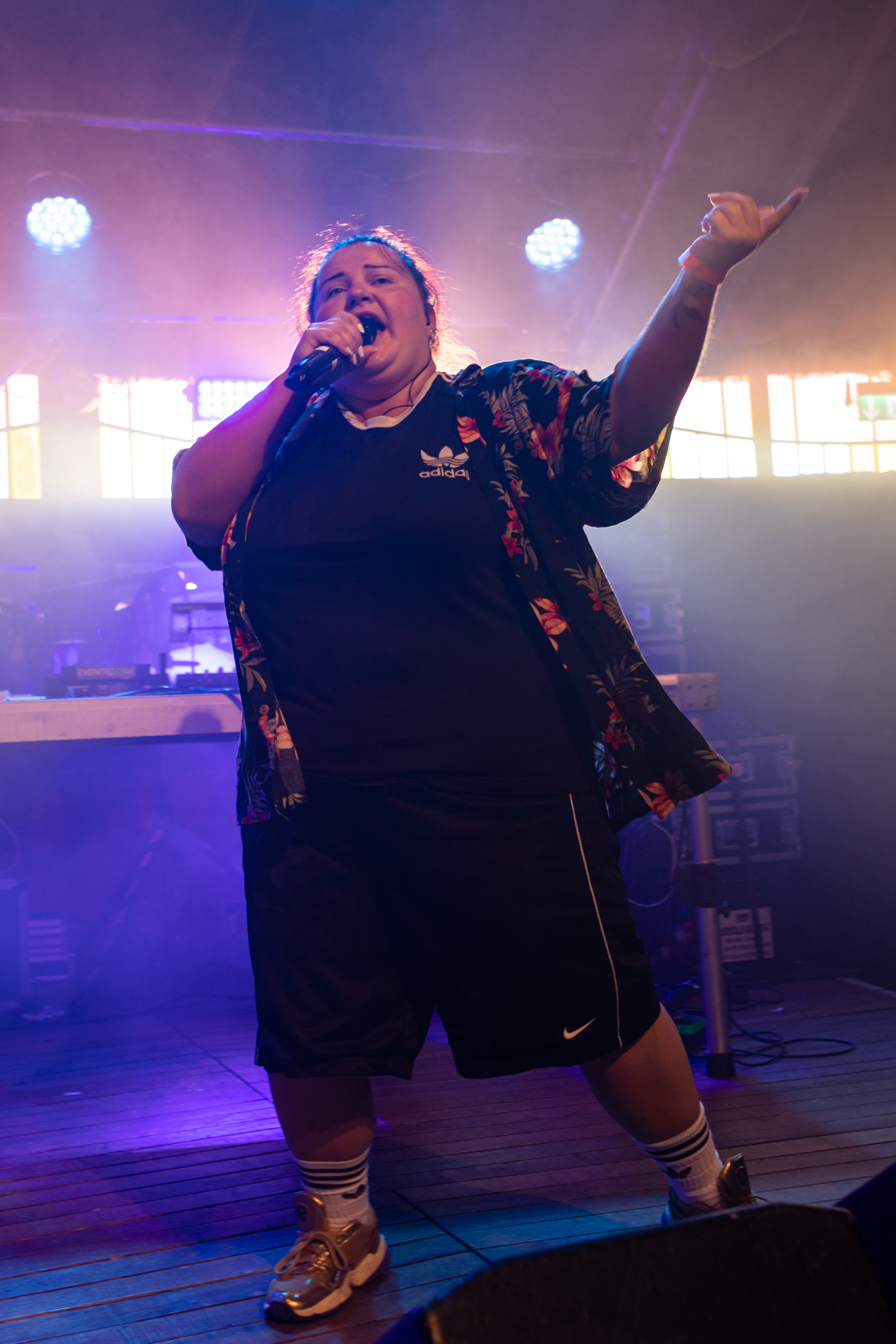
Alyona Alyona at the Haldern Pop festival in 2019

Alyona started writing rap music in the middle of the 2000s, with multiple attempts to reach a wider audience. Her initial stage name was Alyona Al.kaida.

Under her current alias, Alyona Alyona released her first videoclip in October 2018, for the song called "Rybky" ("Рибки"). On 24 October, she released the second videoclip of the same track, this time with professional directing. On 12 November, she released the videoclip of "Holovy" ("Голови"), which garnered one million views on YouTube in the first month. This was followed by two more videoclips: "Vidchyniai" ("Відчиняй") on November 30, and "Zalyshaiu svii dim" ("Залишаю свій дім") in December. The latter symbolically depicts the artist leaving Baryshivka, her home town.

In January 2019, in the midst of a political scandal involving President Poroshenko, alyona alyona released a new song, titled "Obitsianky" ("Обіцянки", "Promises"). Later that year, on 8 April, Alyona Alyona released her first album, Pushka (Пушка), as well as the videoclip of the homonymous main track. The album features four previously released songs, as well as nine new ones, including "Padlo" ("Падло"), in a duo with Alina Pash. Alyona was praised in the Vogue issue of that month as "Ukraine's most unlikely rap star".

Alyona Alyona performed at the Sziget Festival in Budapest in August 2019. In December 2019, she wrote the lyrics of "Vilna" ("Вільна"), a song performed by Tina Karol and Julia Sanina and included in the soundtrack of the Ukrainian feature film Viddana. On 7 February 2020, she signed with the Polish label Def Jam Polska. On 15 January 2021, Alyona Alyona won the Public Choice Award at Music Moves Europe Talent Awards contest.

Alyona Alyona was part of the Ukrainian jury for the Eurovision Song Contest 2021. She and Jerry Heil were selected among the finalists of Ukrainian preselection for the Eurovision Song Contest 2024 with the song "Teresa & Maria"; they went on to win the selection on 4 February 2024, earning the right to represent the country. At Eurovision, Alyona and Heil were drawn to compete in the first semi-final, where they placed second out of 15 with 173 points, qualifying to the final, where they placed third out of 26 with 453 points.

== Discography ==
=== Studio albums ===
List of studio albums, with selected details
Title	Details
Pushka	Released: 8 April 2019; Label: Hitwonder; Formats: Digital download, streaming
V khati MA	Released: 25 November 2019; Label: Hitwonder; Formats: Digital download, streaming
Galas	Released: 16 April 2021; Label: Come True GmbH, Def Jam Recordings Poland; Formats: Digital download, streaming
Lava	Released: 10 December 2021; Label: Columbia, ENKO; Formats: Digital download, streaming
Naymuzychnisha yalynka krayiny	Released: 5 December 2025; Label: ENKO; Formats: Digital download, streaming

=== Extended plays ===
List of EPs, with selected details
Title	Details
Dai Boh (with Jerry Heil)	Released: 26 August 2022; Label: Columbia / ENKO; Formats: Digital download, streaming

=== Singles ===
==== As lead artist ====
Title	Year	Peak chart positions								Album or EP
Title	Year	UKR Air.	FIN	IRE	LTU	NLD	SWE	UK	WW Excl. US	Album or EP
"Rybky"	2018	104	—	—	—	—	—	—	—	Non-album single
"Holovy"	2018	—	—	—	—	—	—	—	—	Pushka
"Jak by ja bula ne ja"	2019	—	—	—	—	—	—	—	—	Pushka
"Litak"	2019	—	—	—	—	—	—	—	—	Pushka
"Pushka"	2019	—	—	—	—	—	—	—	—	Pushka
"Mrija" (with Brosko)	2019	—	—	—	—	—	—	—	—	Non-album single
"Stershenʹ (Own Core)" (with Kalush, Otoy, Bilyy Bo, Shersen, Dyktor & Djadja Vova)	2020	—	—	—	—	—	—	—	—	Galas
"Dancer" (with Vladimir Cauchemar)	2020	70	—	—	—	—	—	—	—	Non-album singles
"Tvij denʹ (Z k/f najkrashchi vykhidni)" (with Onuka, Artem Pyvovarov, and Julia Sanina)	2022	—	—	—	—	—	—	—	—	Non-album singles
"Ridni moji" (featuring Jerry Heil)	2022	7	—	—	—	—	—	—	—	Non-album singles
"Chomu?" (featuring Jerry Heil)	2022	54	—	—	—	—	—	—	—	Non-album singles
"Kupala" (featuring Jerry Heil and ela.)	2022	14	—	—	—	—	—	—	—	Non-album singles
"Dolja" (with Krechet)	2022	—	—	—	—	—	—	—	—	Ukrajinofikacija
"Viter viie" (with Jerry Heil and Gedz)	2022	—	—	—	—	—	—	—	—	Dai Boh
"Dai Boh" (with Jerry Heil and Monika Liu)	2022	190	—	—	—	—	—	—	—	Dai Boh
"Zozulia" (with Jerry Heil and Ginger Mane)	2022	—	—	—	—	—	—	—	—	Dai Boh
"Ljuli, ljuli" (with Artem Pyvovarov)	2022	195	—	—	—	—	—	—	—	Non-album singles
"Posmakuj" (with Jerry Heil and Trill Pem)	2022	—	—	—	—	—	—	—	—	Non-album singles
"Ekzamen" (with Jerry Heil)	2022	—	—	—	—	—	—	—	—	Non-album singles
"Palaj" (with Santorin)	2023	—	—	—	—	—	—	—	—	Shto ya?
"Nebo khylytʹsja" (with Kola)	2023	—	—	—	—	—	—	—	—	Non-album singles
"Shchedra nich" (with Kola and Jerry Heil)	2023	91	—	—	—	—	—	—	—	Non-album singles
"Teresa & Maria" (with Jerry Heil)	2024	1	14	55	2	68	30	100	130	Maria
"Podolyanochka (Get Up)" (with Jerry Heil)	2024	—	—	—	—	—	—	—	—	Non-album singles
"Tato"	2024	—	—	—	—	—	—	—	—	Non-album singles
"Moye pokolinnya" (with Vyshebaba)	2024	—	—	—	—	—	—	—	—	Non-album singles
"Til'ky v tvoyikh obiymakh" (with Kler)	2024	—	—	—	—	—	—	—	—	Non-album singles
"A shcho bude"	2024	—	—	—	—	—	—	—	—	Non-album singles
"Dvi dushi"	2025	—	—	—	—	—	—	—	—	Non-album singles
"Zaprosi mene" (with Kler)	2025	—	—	—	—	—	—	—	—	Non-album singles
"Tam, de nemaye lyudey"	2025	—	—	—	—	—	—	—	—	Non-album singles
"A khto kheytytʹ"	2025	—	—	—	—	—	—	—	—	Non-album singles
"Mriy smilyvo" (with Svitlana Tarabarova)	2025	—	—	—	—	—	—	—	—	Non-album singles
"Lety" (with Skylerr)	2025	—	—	—	—	—	—	—	—	Naymuzychnisha yalynka krayiny
"Ne skhozhi" (with Melovin)	2025	—	—	—	—	—	—	—	—	Naymuzychnisha yalynka krayiny
"Stantsiya osin'" (with Steblyuk)	2025	—	—	—	—	—	—	—	—	Non-album single
"Tam, de zhyve lyubov" (with Maksym Borodin)	2025	—	—	—	—	—	—	—	—	Naymuzychnisha yalynka krayiny
"Z ponedilka" (with Sugar)	2025	—	—	—	—	—	—	—	—	Naymuzychnisha yalynka krayiny
"Hosti" (with Fiïnka)	2025	—	—	—	—	—	—	—	—	Naymuzychnisha yalynka krayiny
"Bat'kam"	2026	—	—	—	—	—	—	—	—	Non-album singles
"Sumno meni"	2026	—	—	—	—	—	—	—	—	Non-album singles
"My zalyshymos' lyud'my"	2026	—	—	—	—	—	—	—	—	Non-album singles
"Vesnyanka" (with Ivanka Chervinska)	2026	—	—	—	—	—	—	—	—	Non-album singles
"Smereky oseni ne znayut'" (with Stepan Hiha Jr.)	2026	—	—	—	—	—	—	—	—	Non-album singles
"Kholodnyy doshch"	2026	—	—	—	—	—	—	—	—	Non-album singles
"—" denotes a recording that did not chart or was not released in that territory.

==== As featured artist ====
Single	Year	Peak chart positions	Album or EP
Single	Year	UKR	Album or EP
"Shali" (Jamala featuring alyona alyona)	2019	—	Svoji
"Voda" (Kalush featuring alyona alyona)	2020	—	Non-album single
"Gori" (Kalush featuring alyona alyona)	2021	139	Hotin
"Krajna ditej" (Okean Elzy featuring alyona alyona)	2021	153	Non-album single
"Rozdam spovna" (ProBass and Hardi featuring alyona alyona)	2022	107	Dobroho vechora, my z Ukrajiny!
"Dosytʹ" (Tvorchi featuring alyona alyona)	2022	89	Heart of Steel
"Zahadaju" (Vlada K featuring alyona alyona)	2024	—	Non-album singles
"Hurt People" (Yetundey featuring alyona alyona)	2025	—	Non-album singles
"Divchyna z sela" (Tarasya featuring alyona alyona and Drita)	2026	—	Non-album singles
"—" denotes a recording that did not chart or was not released in that territory.

== Videoclips ==
Year	Title	Album	Director	Ref
2018	"Rybky" / «Рибки»	—N/a	Delta Arthur	
2018	"Rybky 2" / «Рибки 2»	—N/a	Yan Bolotov	
2018	„Holovy” / «Голови»	Pushka / «Пушка»	Sasha Prylutskyi	
2018	"Vidchynyai" / «Відчиняй»	Pushka / «Пушка»	Yan Bolotov	
2018	"Zalyshayu sviy dim" / «Залишаю свій дім»	Pushka / «Пушка»	Delta Arthur	
2019	"Pushka" / «Пушка»	Pushka / «Пушка»	Delta Arthur, Igor Basket	
2019	"Padlo" / «Падло» (with Alina Pash)	Pushka / «Пушка»	Nathan Daisy	
2019	"Velyka i smishna" / «Велика й смішна»	Pushka / «Пушка»	Delta Arthur, Basket Films	
2019	"Bullying" / «Булiнг»	—N/a	Delta Arthur	
2019	"Zavtra" / «Завтра»	V khati MA / «В хаті МА»	Basket Films	
2019	"Mamyn sup" / «Мамин суп»	V khati MA / «В хаті МА»	Yan Bolotov	
2019	"Zabyrai" / «Забирай» (with Jamala)	—N/a	Win-Win Productions	
2020	"Dyki tantsi" / «Дикі танці»	V khati MA / «В хаті МА»	Anya Velosipedova	

=== Collaborations ===
Year	Title	With	Album	Director	Ref
2019	"Hory" / «Гори»	Kalush	—N/a	Delta Arthur	
2020	"Zhali" / «Жалі»	Jamala	Svoi / «Свої»	Dmytro Chernyavskyi	

== Accolades ==
Award	Year	Category	Nominee(s)	Result	Ref.
Yearly Ukrainian National Awards	2018	Best Hip-Hop Hit	"Rybky" (Рибки)	Nominated	
Anchor Award of Reeperbahn Festival	2019	Best New Artist	Herself	Won	
M1 Music Awards	2019	Debut of the Year	"Velyka i smishna" (Велика й смішна)	Nominated	
M1 Music Awards	2019	Dance Parade	"Padlo" (Падло) (with Alina Pash)	Nominated	
Rap.ua Awards	2019	Breakthrough of the Year	"Pushka" (Пушка)	Won	
Rap.ua Awards	2019	Best Release	"Pushka" (Пушка)	Won	
Aprize Music Awards	2020	Best Ukrainian Album of the Year	"Pushka" (Пушка)	Won	
Yearly Ukrainian Music Awards	2020		"Pushka" (Пушка)		
Yearly Ukrainian Music Awards	2020	Best Album	"Pushka" (Пушка)	Nominated	
Yearly Ukrainian Music Awards	2020	Best Hip-Hop Hit	"Pushka" (Пушка)	Nominated	
Yearly Ukrainian Music Awards	2020	Best Hip-Hop Hit	"Gory" (with Kalush)	Won	
Yearly Ukrainian Music Awards	2020	Best Hip-Hop Hit	"Padlo" (Падло) (with Alina Pash)	Won	
Yearly Ukrainian Music Awards	2020	Best Duo	"Padlo" (Падло) (with Alina Pash)	Nominated	
Yearly Ukrainian Music Awards	2020	Best Beginning of the Year	Herself	Nominated	
Yearly Ukrainian Music Awards	2020	Best Female Artist	Herself	Won	
Women in Arts	2020	Women in Music	Herself	Won	
Music Moves Europe Award	2021	Music Moves Europe Talent Award	Herself	Won	
Music Moves Europe Award	2021	Public Choice Award	Herself	Won	
Eurovision Awards	2024	Best Artistic Vision	Herself (with Jerry Heil)	Won	

Awards and achievements
Preceded by Tvorchi with "Heart of Steel"	Ukraine in the Eurovision Song Contest (with Jerry Heil); 2024	Succeeded by Ziferblat with "Bird of Pray"
