= Ukrainian hip-hop =

Ukrainian hip hop is a major part of the Ukrainian music scene. Refers to all genres of hip hop music in the Ukrainian language. The term Ukr-hop is also sometimes used to refer to any hip hop music made by Ukrainians, including instrumental hip hop, as well as rap songs by members of the Ukrainian diaspora.

== History ==
In Ukraine hip hop began to develop in the 1990s. In 1989 started their activities two biggest hip hop groups at that time - TNMK and V.U.Z.V. The pioneers of Ukrainian hip hop were TNMK (Kharkiv), V.U.Z.V (Kyiv), Osnovnyy Pokaznyk (Luts'k), Tartak (Lviv) and GreenJolly (Ivano-Frankivs'k). At the end of the 1990s and beginning of the 2000s, audience considered Kharkiv and Lviv as the main center of the Ukra.hop subculture. Many groups successfully performed at festivals such as Chervona Ruta and Tavriyski Ihry. At the mid-2000s a lot of underground bands and artists from another cities in Ukraine began to appear and became popular: DaHok (Drohobych), Zахідна Коаліція (Stryi), Kryzhyk (Uman), Sheksta (Stryi), Sirius MC (Kalush) and Freel (Kyiv).

In 2005, Ukraine's entrant in the Eurovision Song Contest, GreenJolly's "Together We Are Many", was also the unofficial anthem of the Orange Revolution. Eurovision demanded the lyrics to be changed for the contest (because it did not correspond to contests rules due to political content). Also this song was remade by Polish hip hop artists.

In 2008 hip hop group LEZO released their fourth studio album, Hostroslovy (Ukrainian: Гострослови). Many critics consider it one of the best in Ukrainian hip-hop industry. The same year KyLЯ and RYLEZ created group Tulym – one of the most successful Ukrainian boom bap groups.

March 11, 2011, Ukrainian rapper Ivan Buyan presented his first music video filmed in New York City.

June 19, 2014, PVNCH presented their new album - Holodnyi (Ukrainian: Голодний, translation: Hungry). According to voting results Holodnyi was named the best hip-hop album of 2014. April 18, 2015, Tulym from Kyiv had a concert with legendary hip-hop band from New York City – Onyx in Sofia, Bulgaria.

Ukrainian hip hop also has the only rapper in hip hop History named NazareN real name Nazar Kotovych or (NazareN Tha Prophet) that raps in four languages with no accent sometimes mixing the languages together when rapping giving a unique sound that has not been done by any other artist.

== Style ==
Musically, Ukrainian hip hop is heavily influenced by Jamaican reggae and Ukrainian folk music, resulting a very tuneful and mellow sound, which makes it quite different from both Russian and American counterparts. There has been an increase in the population of West Africans in Ukraine, and hip hop events have reflected musical trends popular in West Africa.

== Famous rappers ==
- TNMK
- Sashko Polozhynskyi
- T-Fest
- Tulym
- paashee
- Glava 94
- VovaZIL’Vova
- Ivan Buyan
- Freel
- Dee the Conscious One
- BUK
- PVNCH
- Sirius MC
- Crazy Lazy
- 5 ESHELON
- OPRYSHKY
- ALCO Brothers
- Yarmak
- Gryby
- VladHQ
- NazareN
- Tricky Nicki
- Alyona alyona
- Kalush
- Grebz
- Zippy Kid
- Brodigy the-X
- Kto TAM?
- Naliva
- Padonki 15 ulicy
- Ballon (ZiQ)

== Biggest rap battles ==
- Banderstadt Battle (VERSUS) - Lviv
- Red Bull Battle - Kyiv

== See also ==
- Music of Ukraine
