= Sugar (singer) =

Ukrainian musical artist

- Born: Oleh Vasylyovich Shkarpeta; 31 August 1995 (age 31); Khmelnytskyi, Khmelnytskyi Oblast, Ukraine
- Genre: Pop

Oleh Vasylyovich Shkarpeta (Ukrainian: Олег Шкарпета; born 31 August 1995), more known mononymously as Sugar (Ukrainian: Шугар), is a Ukrainian singer, and influencer. His notable songs are "Тьотя" (Tyotya, Aunt), and "Олег" (Oleh), that became popular on TikTok in early 2025.

== Early life ==
Shkarpeta was born on 31 August 1995, in Khmelnytskyi. By education, an economist, studied at Khmelnytskyi University of Management and Law at the Faculty of Economics, then worked as a graphic designer in the IT field.

== Career ==
He began his musical career by performing covers, which he uploaded to Instagram. While studying at the university, he joined a music band, and later, together with a guitarist friend, formed a duo with which he performed in venues and at local events.

Jerry Heil's song 'Okhrana, otmena' inspired his songwriting and motivated him to write his first track 'Ratata'. However, he first gained popularity not as a singer, but thanks to a humorous blog on TikTok.

He gained wide popularity thanks to two songs — 'Oleh' and 'Tyotya', which went viral on TikTok. At the beginning of July 2025, the song 'Oleh' ranked second in the number of streams from Ukraine on Spotify.

== Personal life ==
In 2025, he married influencer Nastia Borscht (Anastasia Kovalchuk).

== Discography ==
=== 2022 ===
- 'Чутки' (Rumors)
- "Голос" (Voice)
- "Віддаю Притулі" (Giving it to Prytula)
- 2023
  - «Електрохарчі» – "Elektrokharchi" (Electrofood)
  - «Вініл» – "Vinil" (Vinyl)
- 2024
  - «Поверхи» – "Poverkhy" (Floors)
  - «Ліхтарі» – "Likhtari" (Lanterns)
  - «Мавка» – "Mavka" (Mavka — a mythological forest spirit)
  - «Олєг» – "Oleh"
  - «Тьотя» – "Tyotya" (Auntie)
  - «Пані Катерино» – "Pani Kateryno" (Lady Kateryna)
  - «BMW» – "BMW"
  - «Токсік» – "Toksik" (Toxic)
- 2025
  - «Тікток» – "Tiktok"
  - «Діва» – "Diva"
  - «Френзона» – "Frenzona" (Friendzone)
  - «Відбита» – "Vidbyta" (Beaten off / Deflected — context-dependent)
  - «Йо-йо» – "Yo-yo"
  - «Ягода» – "Yahoda" (Berry)
