= Good Evening (Where Are You From?) =

2022 Ukrainian patriotic song

Song by ProBass and Hardi
- Language: Ukrainian
- Released: October 2021
- Genre: Ukrainian folk music, electronic dance music
- Length: 2:48
- Songwriters: ProBass, Hardi

"Good Evening (Where Are You From?)" (Ukrainian: Доброго вечора), also known by its incipit "Good evening, we are from Ukraine" (Ukrainian: Доброго вечора, ми з України, romanized: Dobroho vechora, My z Ukrainy), is a song by the Ukrainian electronic duo ProBass and Hardi, which was released in October 2021, as well as an informal military greeting in Ukraine, which became popular after the 2022 Russian invasion of Ukraine. The track reached number 8 on the Ukrainian Apple Music chart in March 2022. Regular use of the phrase, without additional translations, introduced it abroad.

== History ==
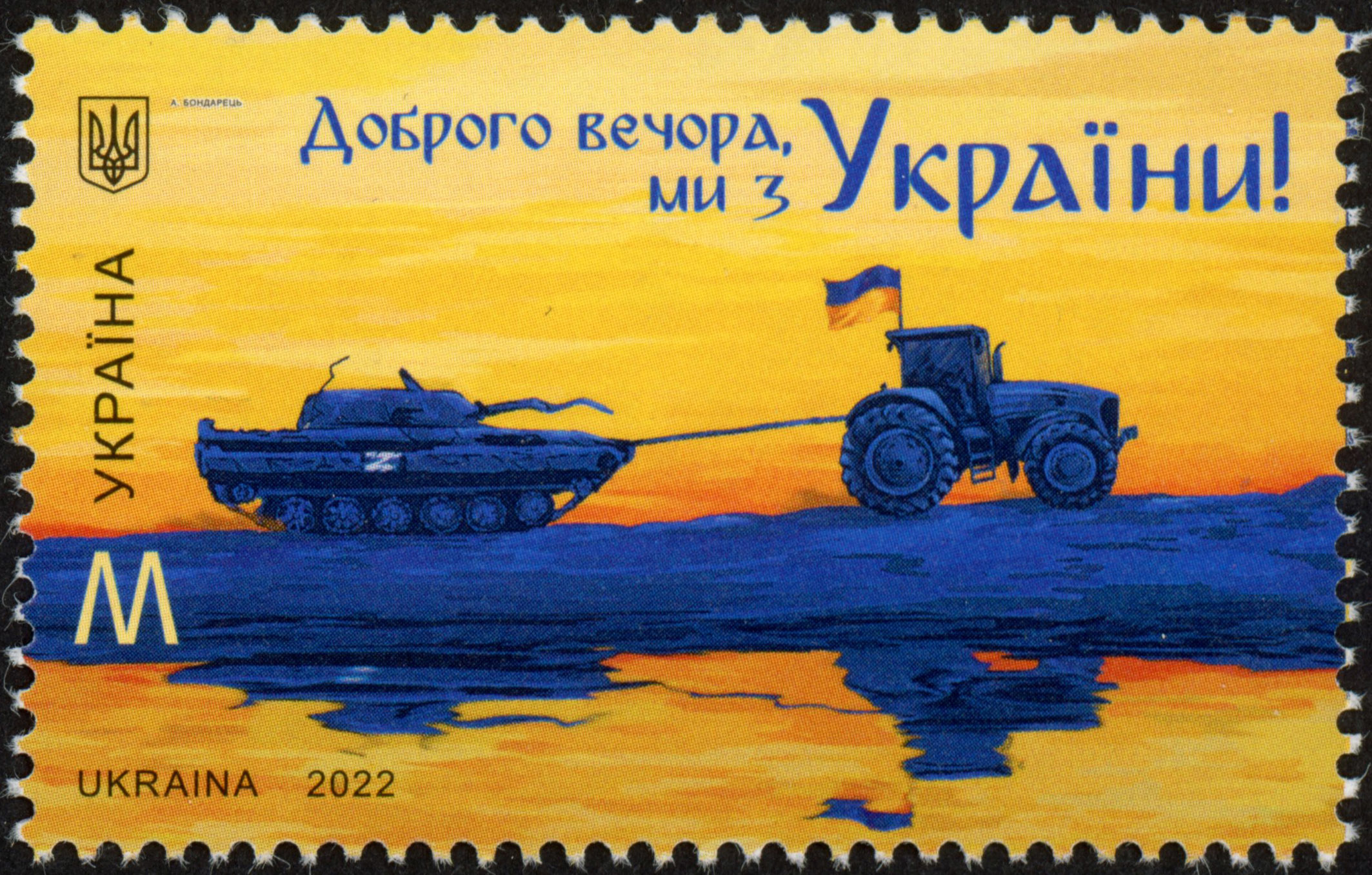
Stamp of Ukraine "Good evening, we are from Ukraine!"

The song was released in October 2021. It was written by ProBass (Artem Tkachenko) and Hardi (Maxim Mokrenko) from Kremenchuk. The song gained popularity in TikTok, where more than 230,000 videos were created using the track. The song has also received tens of millions of views in various variations on the internet.

At the session of the Kremenchuk City Council on March 15, 2022, the Mayor of Kremenchuk Vitaliy Maletsky presented awards to the authors of the track "Good evening, we are from Ukraine". Artem Tkachenko (DJ ProBass) - badge "For services to the city", Maxim Mokrenko (DJ Hardi) - badge and gratitude of the mayor of Kremenchuk.

=== Slogan during the Russo-Ukrainian War ===
The song's incipit "Good evening, we are from Ukraine", became a popular unofficial military greeting in Ukraine after the Russian military invasion, and gained widespread use. The Governor of Mykolaiv Oblast Vitaliy Kim, as well as the Armed Forces of Ukraine, the Minister of Defense Oleksii Reznikov, and journalists begin their video addresses. According to the performers of the track, it is heard in many bomb shelters of Ukraine and lifts the spirits of Ukrainians.

=== Commemorative stamps ===
In July 2022, Ukrposhta, the Ukrainian postal service, issued a postage stamp on the theme of the phrase.

== See also ==
- Stefania (song)
