= Kapitanivka, Kirovohrad Oblast =

Rural locality in Kirovohrad Oblast, Ukraine

Kapitanivka Капітанівка
- Rural settlement
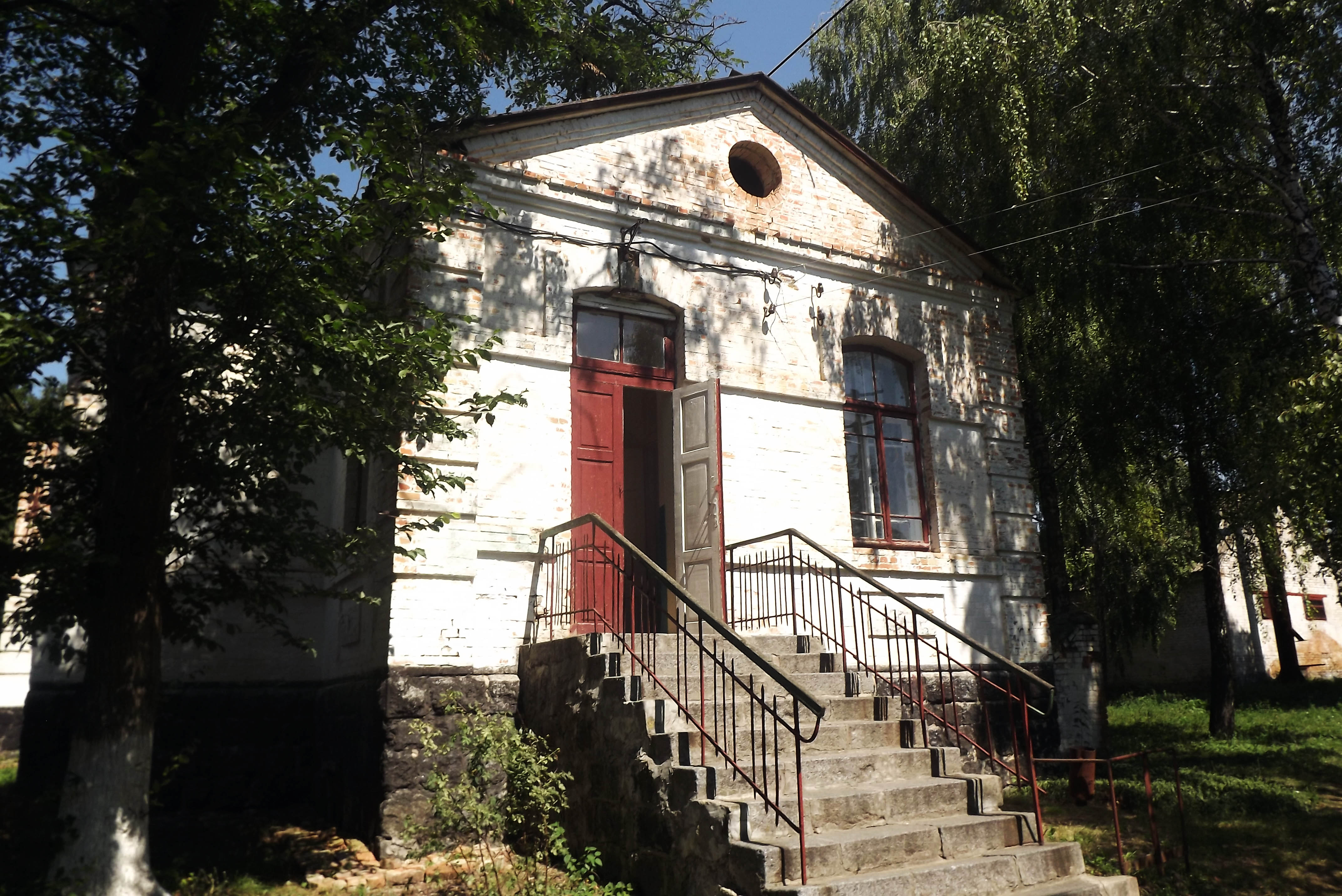

- Location in Kirovohrad Oblast Location in Ukraine
- Coordinates: 48°54′53″N 31°42′33″E
- Country: Ukraine
- Oblast: Kirovohrad Oblast
- Raion: Novoukrainka Raion
- Hromada: Novomyrhorod urban hromada

Population (2022)
  - Total: 2,430
- Time zone: UTC+2 (EET)
  - Summer (DST): UTC+3 (EEST)

Kapitanivka (Ukrainian: Капітанівка; Russian: Капитановка) is a rural settlement in Novoukrainka Raion, Kirovohrad Oblast, Ukraine. It is located on the banks of the Rozlyvna, a tributary of the Velyka Vys, in the drainage basin of the Southern Bug, at the border with Cherkasy Oblast. Kapitanivka belongs to Novomyrhorod urban hromada, one of the hromadas of Ukraine. Population: 2,430 (2022 estimate).

== History ==
Until 18 July 2020, Kapitanivka belonged to Novomyrhorod Raion. The raion was abolished in July 2020 as part of the administrative reform of Ukraine, which reduced the number of raions of Kirovohrad Oblast to four. The area of Novomyrhorod Raion was merged into Novoukrainka Raion.

Until 26 January 2024, Kapitanivka was designated urban-type settlement. On this day, a new law entered into force which abolished this status, and Kapitanivka became a rural settlement.

== Economy ==
=== Transportation ===
Kapitanivka railway station is on the railway connecting Smila and Pomichna. There is infrequent passenger traffic.

The settlement is connected by road with Novomyrhorod and Smila.

== People from Kapitanivka ==
- Alyona Alyona (born 1991), Ukrainian rapper
