= TNMK =

Ukrainian hip-hop group

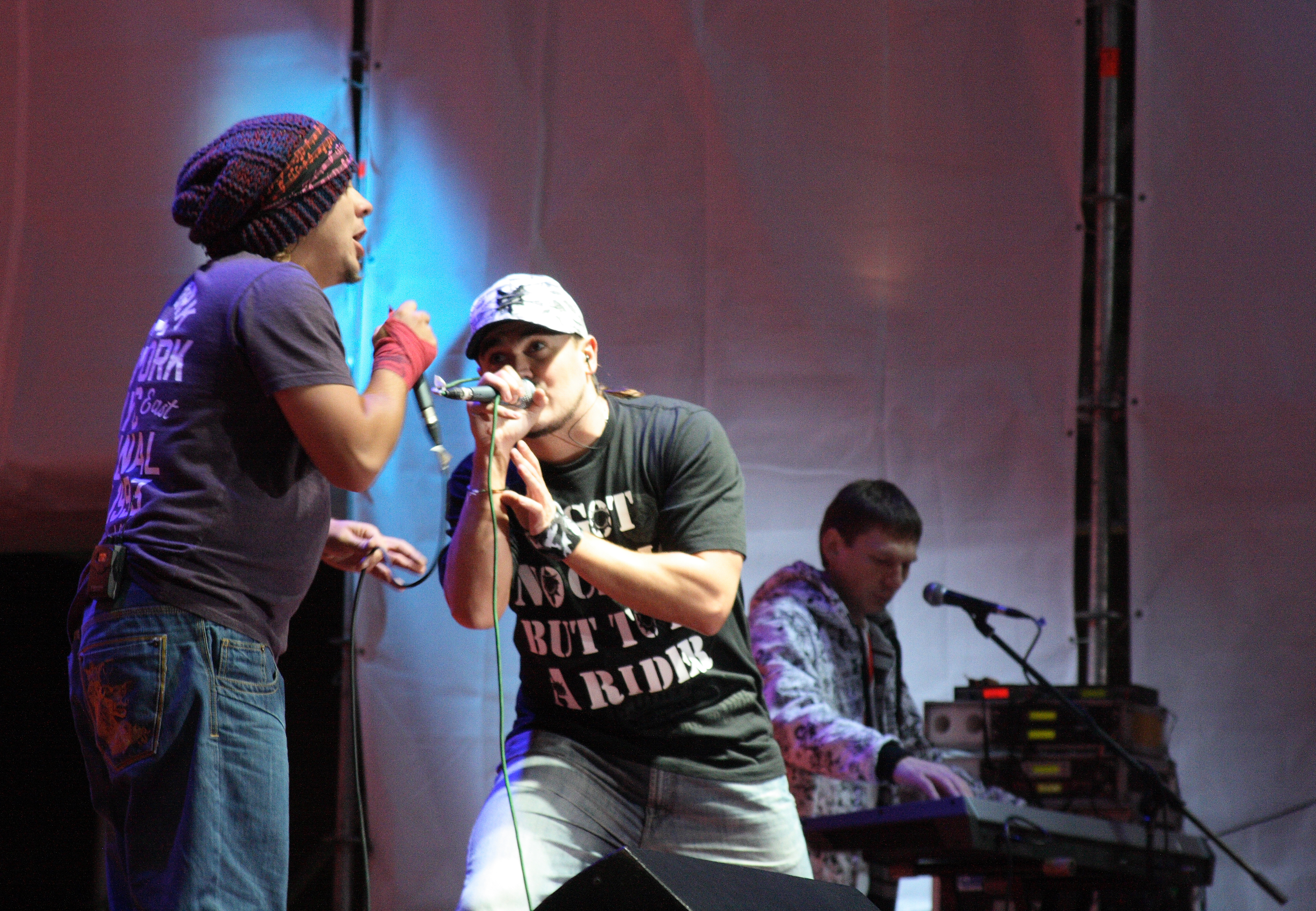
- TNMK in 2009

Background information
- Origin: Kharkiv, Ukraine
- Genres: Hip hop; Alternative hip hop; Rap rock; Jazz; Funk; Rapcore
- Years active: 1989–present
- Labels: Moon Records; Lavina Music; Nova Records; Astra Rekords; Volya Records
- Members: Fahot; Fozzi; Kotya; Yarik; Oleksandr Shymansʹkyy; Vitolʹd; TonIk
- Past members: Dilya
- Website: tnmk.com

TNMK or Tanok na Maidani Kongo (Ukrainian: Танок на майдані Конґо [tɐˈnɔk nɐ mɐjˈdɑn⁽ʲ⁾i ˈkɔnɡo]; lit. "Dance at the Congo Square") is a Ukrainian hip-hop group. Considered one of the most successful hip-hop groups of Ukraine, they are known for clever, yet often tongue-in-cheek, lyrics; mixing hip-hop with rock, funk and jazz music and playing real instruments on their albums and live shows without using samples and drum machines. TNMK performed at many festivals as: Sziget Fest, Zakhid, Tavria Games, Chervona Ruta, Faine Misto and Bandershtat.

== History ==
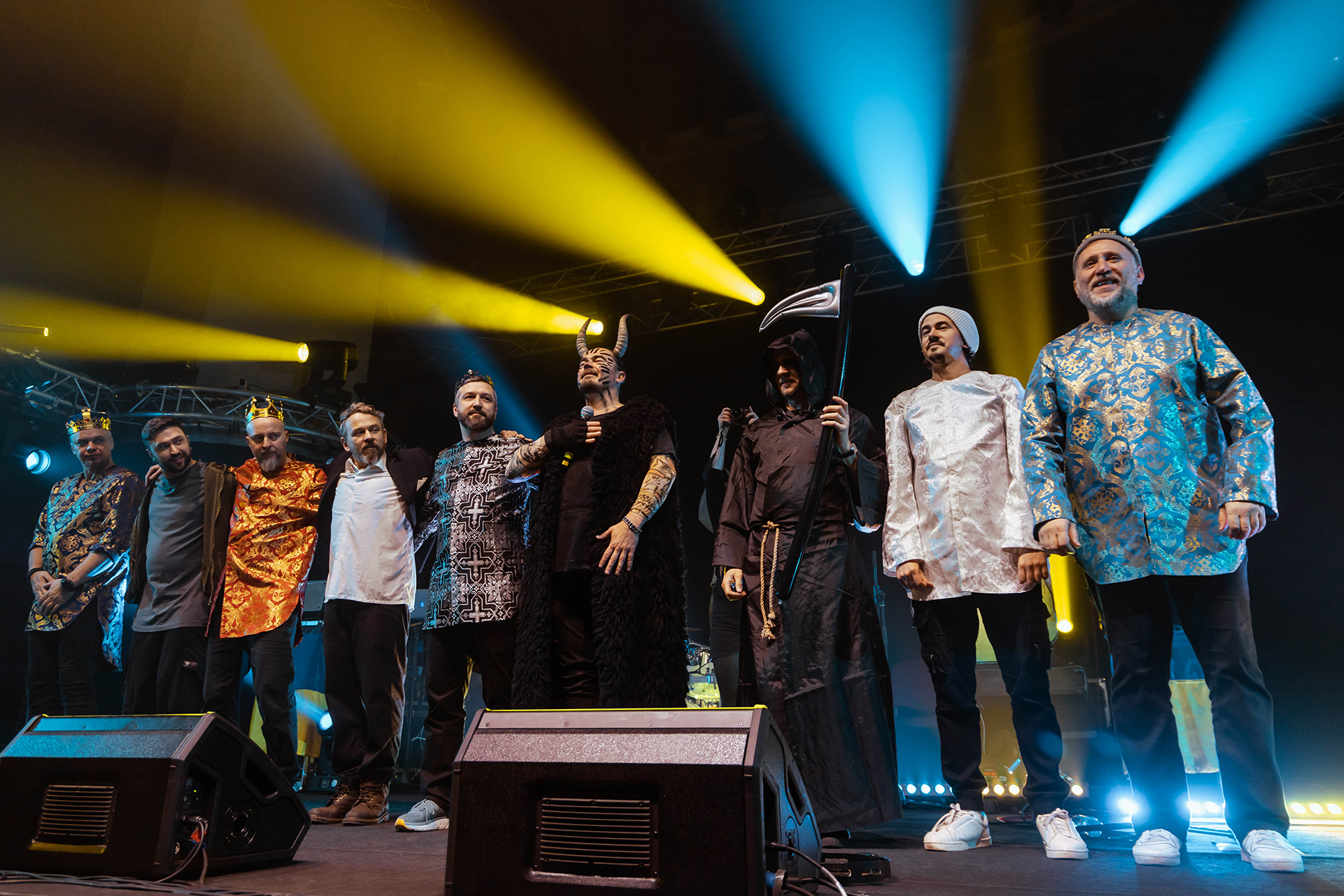
TNMK Nativity scene 2023 Poland

The group was formed at a labor camp on 14 June 1989 by Oleksandr "Fozzi" Sydorenko and Kostiantyn "Kotia" Zhuikov and was originally called Novye Doma (Russian: Новые Дома) after one of the Kharkiv city neighborhoods where members of the band lived. They performed at the camp graduation ceremony, after which it was decided to gather the full band on 1 September 1989 at the school No. 11 where they studied. In September of the same year during subbotnik, the band guitarist Ivan Rykov, instead of painting a goal post, drew at the school shooting range a phrase "НОВЫЕ ДОМА ГР", while for the rest УППА he ran out of paint (ГРУППА in Russian means a band). The phrase survived for over 20 years, but faded away over a time. Originally Novye Doma played near the local Palace of Pioneers (southeastern portion of the city), but later managed to secure a studio at the Palace of Pioneers in the west side of the city where they performed in 1990-1994. Coincidentally just over the fence from the Palace of Culture was located a boarding music school where at the same time the future band member Oleh Mykhailyuta was learning to play bassoon (Italian: fagotto). The palace administration allowed the band to perform under one condition that they would play one of the popular songs once a week. Among the composition that they had to learn was I've Been Thinking About You by Londonbeat, Don't Cry by Guns N' Roses, as well as Soviet pop songs.

On suggestion of the band's wind instruments performer Maksym Lytvynenko, the band changed its name to Tanets na ploschadi Kongo after the Congo Square in New Orleans, which is considered to be a place where jazz was born.

Sometime in 1997 the band changed its name to the current Ukrainian version which was adopted for the 1997 Chervona Ruta festival.

TNMK released its first album, Zroby meni hip-hop, in 1998. The title track became an underground hit in Ukraine, but it was only with the release of Neformat in 2001 that they rose to mainstream popularity. Pozhezhi mista Vavilon, released in 2004, had a harder sound, while Jazzy, released in the same year, was a live album recorded with a Ukrainian jazz band, Skhid-Side, and featured TNMK songs re-arranged in a jazz and funk style. In the same year, the group toured France and recorded French versions of some of their songs. Their album Syla was voted the best album of 2005 by the most popular Ukrainian music portal music.com.ua. Their 2008 album, ReFormatTsia vol.2, is a compilation of remixes of their songs sung by them and other singers such as Oleh Skrypka, Mariya Burmaka and GreatFruit. The album also includes a remix of the song "Chervona Ruta" featuring Sofia Rotaru. In 2014 they released their album Dzerkalo.

== Discography ==
- 1998 Zroby meni hip-hop (Make me hip hop) (Зроби мені хіп-хоп)
- 2001 Neformat (Curiosities) (Неформат)
- 2002 Reformatsiya (Reformation) (Реформація) (remix album)
- 2004 Pozhezhi mista Vavilon (Fires of the City Babylon) (Пожежі міста Вавілон)
- 2004 Jazzy (live album)
- 2005 Syla (The Power) (Сила)
- 2008 ReFormatTsia vol.2 (ReFormation vol.2) (remix album)
- 2010 S.P.A.M. (С.П.А.М.)
- 2014 Dzerkalo (The Mirror) (Дзеркало)
- 2018 7
