= Teresa & Maria =

2024 song by Alyona Alyona and Jerry Heil

Single by Alyona Alyona and Jerry Heil

from the EP Maria
- Released: 11 January 2024
- Genre: Pop rap, folk pop
- Length: 2:59
- Label: Enko
- Songwriters: Aliona Savranenko; Anton Chilibi; Ivan Klymenko; Yana Shemaieva

Alyona Alyona singles chronology
"Shchedra nich" (2023)	"Teresa & Maria" (2024)	"Podolyanochka (Get Up)" (2024)

Jerry Heil singles chronology
"Malanka" (2023)	"Teresa & Maria" (2024)	"Podolyanochka (Get Up)" (2024)

Music video
- "Teresa & Maria" on YouTube

Eurovision Song Contest 2024 entry
- Country: Ukraine
- Artists: Alyona Alyona and Jerry Heil
- Languages: Ukrainian, English
- Composers: Anton Chilibi; Ivan Klymenko
- Lyricists: Aliona Savranenko; Yana Shemaieva

Finals performance
- Semi-final result: 2nd
- Semi-final points: 173
- Final result: 3rd
- Final points: 453

Entry chronology
- ◄ "Heart of Steel" (2023)
- "Bird of Pray" (2025) ►

Official performance video
- "Teresa & Maria" (First Semi-Final) on YouTube "Teresa & Maria" (Grand Final) on YouTube

"Teresa & Maria" (Ukrainian: Тереза і Марія, romanized: Tereza i Mariia, pronounced [teˈrɛzɐ i mɐˈr⁽ʲ⁾ijɐ]) is a song by Ukrainian rapper Alyona Alyona and Ukrainian singer Jerry Heil. Described as a song about hope, resilience and empowerment inspired by the humanity of both Albanian Roman Catholic saint Mother Teresa and the Virgin Mary, it was written by Alyona, Heil, Anton Chilibi, and Ivan Klymenko. It was released on 11 January 2024 through Enko Music, and represented Ukraine in the Eurovision Song Contest 2024, where it placed in third with 453 points.

== Background and composition ==
"Teresa & Maria" is composed by Anton Chilibi and Ivan Klymenko, with lyrics written by Aliona Savranenko and Yana Shemaieva, known by their stage names, Alyona Alyona and Jerry Heil, respectively. According to the duo, the song attempts to inspire hope by implying that divinity exists within all humans as exemplified by the Roman Catholic saint Mother Teresa and the Virgin Mary, mother of Jesus, who "were born as human beings". The songwriting duo have stated that the song is not about the two figures, but references them to symbolize "charity, love, [and] unification".

In other interviews, they have described the song as a reminder that we are responsible for our own destiny, and that happiness is only achievable if one seeks out for it and creates it for themselves. They have also stated that the song was conceived as a message of empowerment for Ukrainian women. In response to the controversies related to Mother Teresa, particularly for her clinics in India displaying a lack of medical care, Alyona defended Mother Teresa stating "she wanted people to live, not die, that's all".

According to both singers, their collaboration came out of their mutual admiration of each other. Heil and Alyona were officially announced to compete in Vidbir 2024 on 12 January 2024. After their victory in Vidbir 2024, Heil announced that the duo were considering changing their performance for the Eurovision Song Contest.

== Music video and promotion ==
An accompanying music video was released on 4 May 2024. To further promote the song, the duo announced their intents to perform at various Eurovision pre-parties throughout the months of March and April 2024, including Pre-Party ES 2024 on 30 March and Eurovision in Concert 2024 on 13 April.

== Critical reception ==
"Teresa & Maria" has been largely well-received. In a Wiwibloggs review containing several reviews from several critics, the song was rated 7.73 out of 10 points, earning fifth out of the 37 songs competing in the Eurovision Song Contest 2024 on the site's annual ranking. Another review conducted by ESC Bubble that contained reviews from a combination of readers and juries rated the song fourth out of the 15 songs "Teresa & Maria" was competing against in its the Eurovision semi-final. Jon O'Brien, a writer for Vulture, ranked the song fourth out of 37 songs, praising the duo's vocal abilities within the song for creating a "dramatic alt-pop production". NPR's Glen Weldon declared the song as a favourite to win, stating that "the two performers remain distinct, and they create a kind of two-sided musical conversation – a song that comments on itself". ESC Beat's Doron Lahav ranked the song fourth overall, proclaiming, "The song is just epic!... together they create a catchy and emotional song." The Scotsman writer Erin Adam rated the song nine out of 10 points, also praising the duo's vocal abilities.

== Eurovision Song Contest ==
=== Vidbir 2024 ===
Ukraine's broadcaster, the Public Broadcasting Company of Ukraine (Suspilne), officially announced their participation in the Eurovision Song Contest 2024 on 7 July 2023, organizing an 11-entry competition, Vidbir 2024, that was to take place on 3 February 2024. The edition was the eighth iteration of the national final. The winning song in the final was selected by a 50/50 vote of a jury panel and a televote, with an 11 point maximum allocated to each group.

The duo were officially announced to compete in Vidbir 2024 on 12 January 2024. For their national final performance, the duo opted to wear black clothes due to their belief that the color represented "sadness... but on the other hand, it is very deep and symbolizes certain limitations". After voting results were delayed by a day, on 4 February, the song was announced to have won the competition, earning 10 points from the juries and a maximum 11 points from the televote. As a result of the victory, the song won the right to represent Ukraine in the Eurovision Song Contest 2024.

=== At Eurovision ===
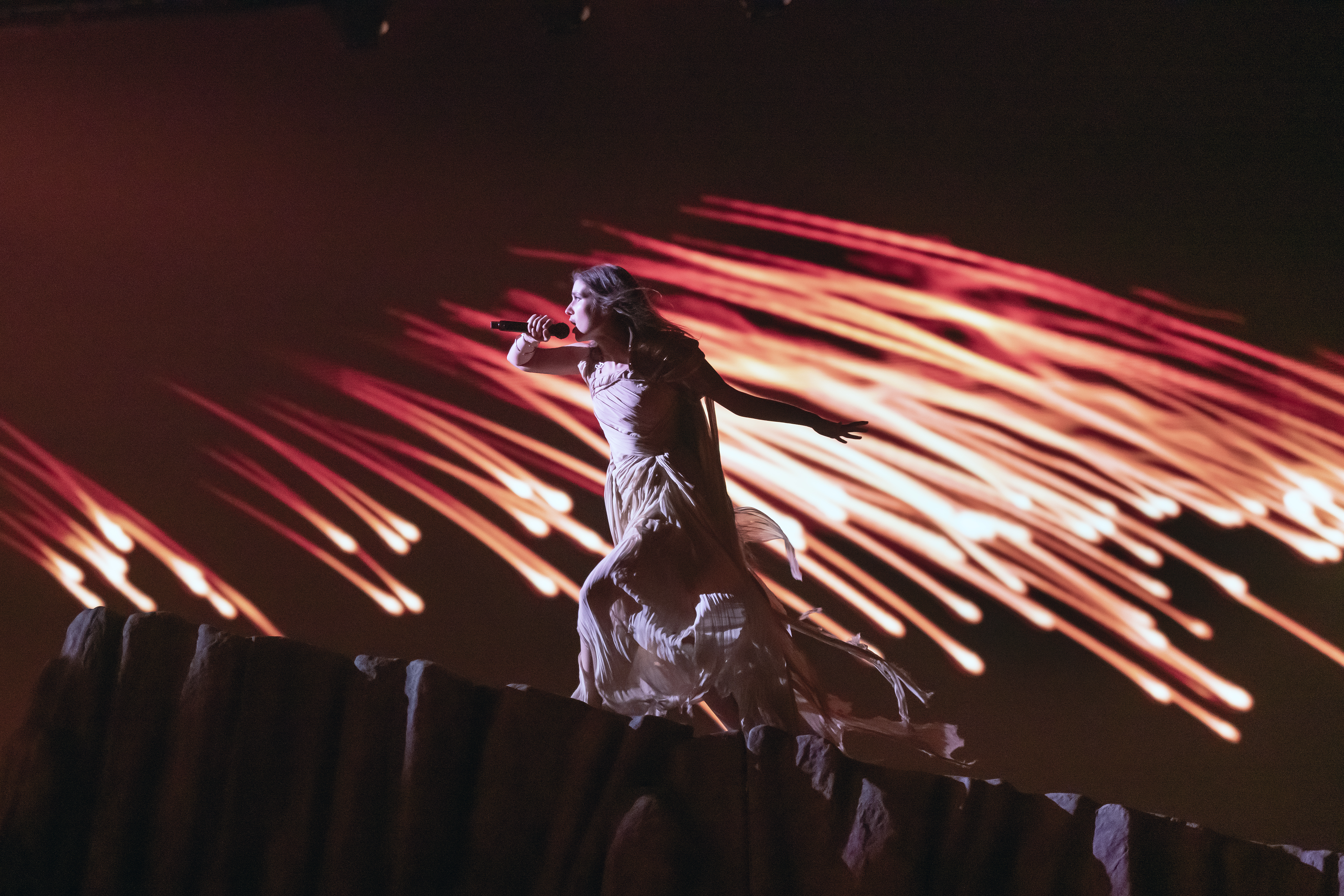
Heil performing "Teresa & Maria" at a dress rehearsal before the Eurovision 2024 grand final.

The Eurovision Song Contest 2024 took place at the Malmö Arena in Malmö, Sweden, and consisted of two semi-finals held on 7 and 9 May, with the final on 11 May 2024. During the allocation draw on 30 January 2024, Ukraine was drawn to compete in the first semi-final, performing in the first half of the show. The duo were later drawn to perform fifth in the semi-final, ahead of Ireland's Bambie Thug and before Poland's Luna.

For the song's Eurovision performance, music video director Tanu Muino was appointed as the creative director and re-imagined the staging. The performance features Heil in a thin muslin dress inspired by Archangel Michael, the patron saint of Kyiv. Heil also opted to wear actual breastplate armor for the performance; in interviews, she stated she chose it because the weight of the breastplates represents "[those] who carry this world on their steel shoulders". Alyona wore a 3 kilograms (6.6 lb) chainmail suit, which she described as "torn and burnt" to represent how "a woman's life is difficult, thorny, [and] full of trials". The lighting reflected the colors of the Ukrainian flag. Heil was bathed in a yellow-orange light during her portion of the performance, while Alyona was lit by cool blue light in hers. Heil climbs an inclined rocky platform while simulations of white phosphorus bombs streak across the sky behind her. This symbolized support for Ukraine over the Russian invasion of Ukraine. During Alyona's performance, ghost-like figures representing ancestors were projected above and behind her. The song concludes with a duet by both performers, who lay down on a background of Ukrainian women. "Teresa & Maria" finished second, scoring 173 points and securing a position in the grand final.

The duo repeated their performance in the grand final on 11 May. The song was in the second slot, ahead of Sweden's duo of Marcus & Martinus and before Germany's Isaak. At the end of their performance, the duo spoke two messages: "Unite for the world" and "Peace and freedom for Ukraine". After the results were announced, they finished in third with 453 points, with a split score of 146 points from juries and 307 points from televoting. Regarding the former, two sets of the maximum 12 points were given by Czechia and Moldova. The song also received seven sets of 12 points from televoting.

== Charts ==
=== Weekly charts ===
Weekly chart performance for "Teresa & Maria"
Chart (2024)	Peak position
Austria (Ö3 Austria Top 40)	38
Croatia (Billboard)	12
CIS Airplay (TopHit)	80
Czech Republic Singles Digital (ČNS IFPI)	84
Finland (Suomen virallinen lista)	14
Global Excl. US (Billboard)	130
Greece International (IFPI)	5
Ireland (IRMA)	55
Israel (Mako Hitlist)	86
Latvia Streaming (LaIPA)	3
Lithuania (AGATA)	2
Luxembourg (Billboard)	19
Netherlands (Single Top 100)	68
Poland (Polish Streaming Top 100)	41
Portugal (AFP)	147
Sweden (Sverigetopplistan)	30
Switzerland (Schweizer Hitparade)	18
Ukraine Airplay (TopHit)	1
UK Singles (Official Charts)	100

=== Monthly charts ===
Monthly chart performance for "Teresa & Maria"
Chart (2024)	Peak position
CIS (TopHit)	85
Ukraine Airplay (TopHit)	1

=== Year-end charts ===
Year-end chart performance for "Teresa & Maria"
Chart (2024)	Peak position
CIS Airplay (TopHit)	177
Ukraine Airplay (TopHit)	1
Chart (2025)	Peak position
Ukraine Airplay (TopHit)	29

== Certifications ==
Certifications for "Teresa & Maria"
Region	Certification	Certified units/sales
Poland (ZPAV)	Gold	25,000^{‡}
Streaming
Greece (IFPI Greece)	Gold	1,000,000^{†}
^{‡} Sales+streaming figures based on certification alone.^{†} Streaming-only figures based on certification alone.

== Release history ==
Release history and formats for "Teresa & Maria"
Country	Date	Format(s)	Label	Ref.
Various	11 January 2024	Digital download; streaming	ENKO Music	
