= Jerry Heil =

Ukrainian singer (born 1995)

- Джеррі Гейл
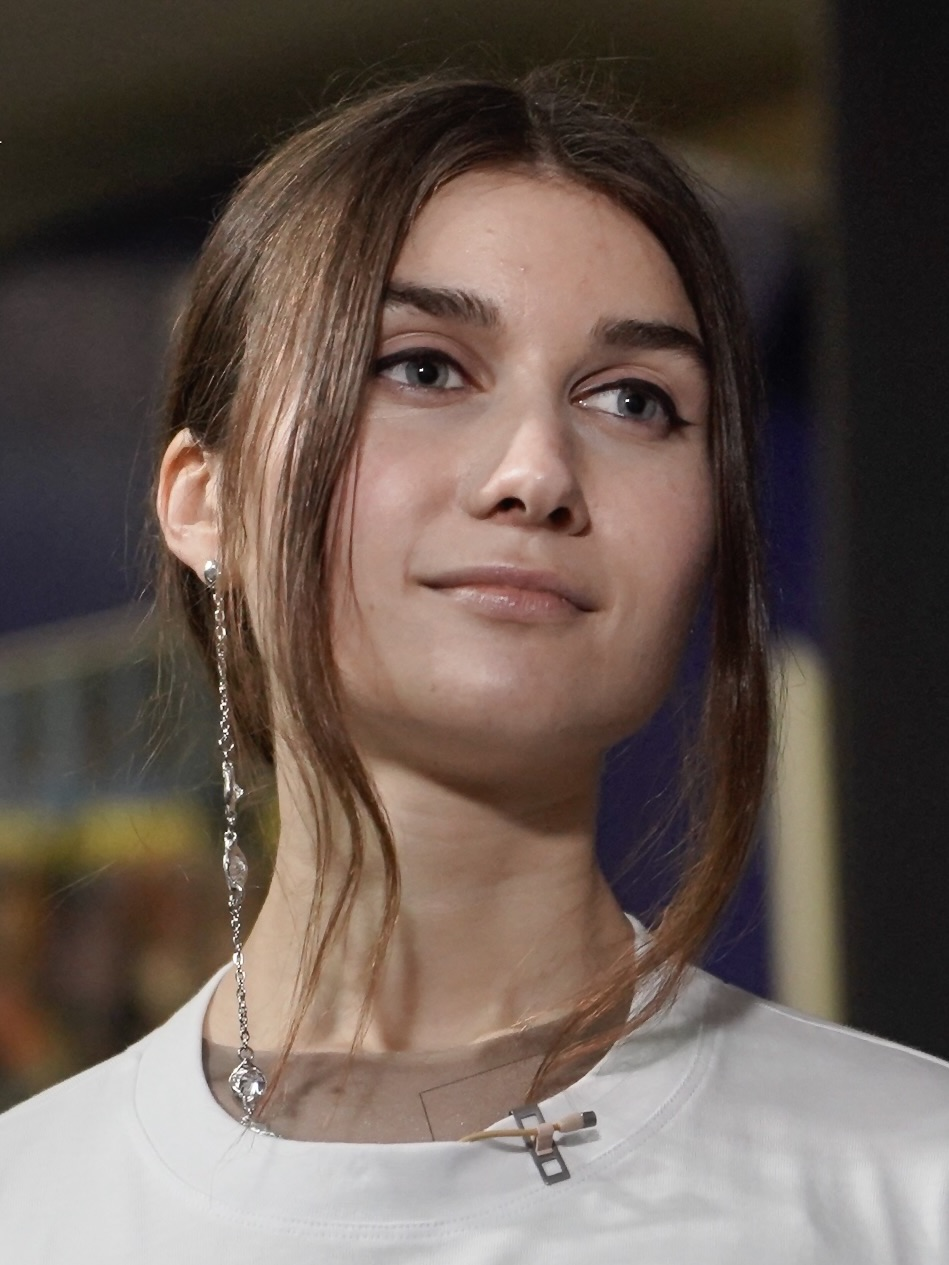
- Heil in 2024
- Born: Yana Oleksandrivna Shemaieva; 21 October 1995 (age 31); Vasylkiv, Kyiv Oblast, Ukraine
- Occupations: Singer; songwriter; YouTuber
- Years active: 2017–present
- Musical career
- Genre: Pop
- Instrument: Vocals
- Labels: Vidlik Records; Best Music; Nova Music

YouTube information
- Channel: JERRY_HEIL
- Years active: 2012–present
- Subscribers: 556 thousand
- Views: 441.5 million
- Last updated: 20 January 2026

Yana Oleksandrivna Shemaieva (sheh-MAH-ye-va; Ukrainian: Яна Олександрівна Шемаєва; born 21 October 1995), known professionally as Jerry Heil (JER-ree HAY-el, Ukrainian: Дже́ррі Гейл [ˈdʒɛr⁽ʲ⁾ːi ˈɦɛi̯l]), is a Ukrainian singer, songwriter and YouTuber. She began her career after launching her YouTube channel in 2012, publishing vlogs and musical covers.

Heil began her professional music career in 2017, releasing her debut extended play De mii dim (transl. Where's my home) with Vidlik Records. She later released the single "Okhrana otmiena" in 2019, which became a top five hit in Ukraine. Her debut studio album Ya yana (transl. I'm Yana) was later released in October 2019. Since starting her YouTube channel, Heil has accumulated more than 34.9 million views and 395 thousand subscribers. She represented Ukraine in the Eurovision Song Contest 2024 alongside Alyona Alyona with the song "Teresa & Maria".

== Early life ==
Yana Shemaieva was born in Vasylkiv, a city just outside of the Ukrainian capital Kyiv. Her parents both work as private traders. Heil attended music schools in Kyiv, attending the R. Glier Kyiv Institute of Music and Kyiv Conservatory.

== Career ==
=== Early career ===
Heil began using her alias at the age of 15. After registering for the Russian social media service VKontakte, she used the name Jerry Mouse, referencing the cartoon character of the same name. She then changed Mouse to Heil, claiming she went to a site with American surnames and chose the one she liked the most. She has described the backstory behind her stage name as "moronic".

In 2012, Heil launched her YouTube channel, where she posted vlogs and covers of songs made popular by Ukrainian and international musicians, such as Twenty One Pilots, Okean Elzy, The Hardkiss, and Kodaline. Okean Elzy frontman Sviatoslav Vakarchuk frequently republished Heil's covers of songs by the band and cited his approval of her versions.

=== 2017–2018: Professional breakthrough and De mii dim ===
In 2017, Heil signed a recording contract with Ukrainian record label Vidlik Records, known for its association with Ukrainian musical group Onuka. She was introduced to the label and its founders Yevhen Filatov and Nata Zhyzhchenko – the leader singer of Onuka – after Heil began looking for producers to assist with her song "De mii dim" (transl. Where's my home). Heil then began working closely with the label, and recorded her debut extended play De mii dim with them, which was later released in October 2017.

In 2018, Heil auditioned for season nine of X-Factor Ukraine. She advanced from the initial audition in front of the judges to the bootcamp phase of the competition, where she was eliminated. After her elimination, Heil returned to music and released the singles "Kava" and "Postil"; the latter of the two releases featured her debut music video.

=== 2019–present: "Okhrana, otmiena", Ya, Yana and Eurovision ===
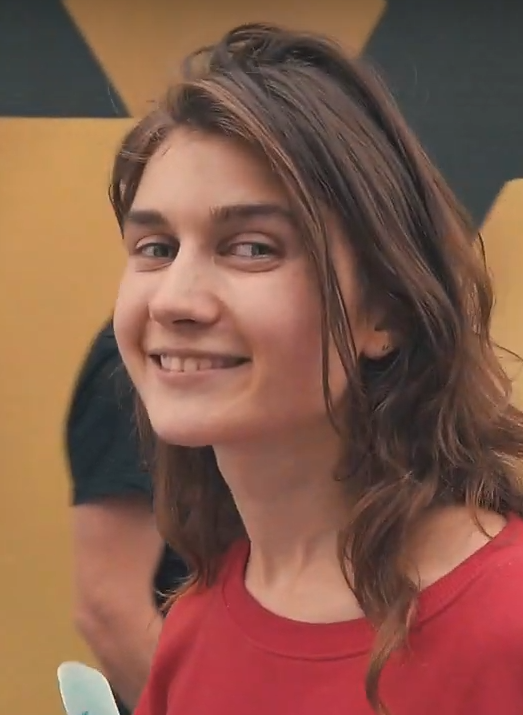
Jerry Heil in 2019

In March 2019, Heil published a portion of her upcoming single "Okhrana, otmiena" on Instagram, which she had recorded with Ukrainian producer Morphom. The track quickly gained momentum, when Ukrainian singers such as NK and Vera Brezhneva complimented and further distributed the song's snippet. Heil later released a full version of the song through YouTube the following month, where its music video has received more than 14.8 million views; "Okhrana, otmiena" additionally became a top five hit in Ukraine. Following the success of the song, Heil began pursuing songwriting, where she wrote songs for musicians including Brezhneva and the Kyiv-based band Cloudless, with Russian songwriter and producer Konstantin Meladze.

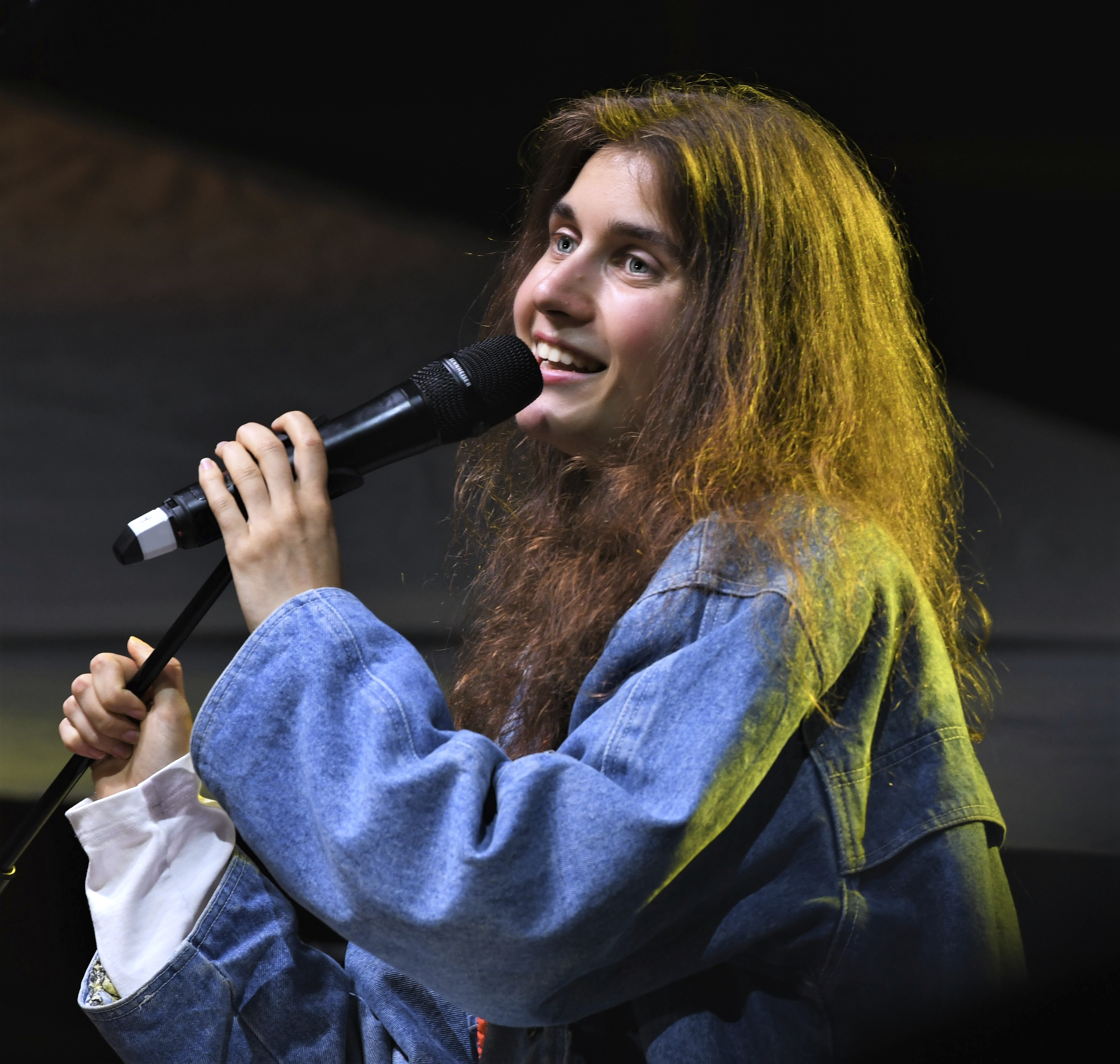
Jerry Heil in Toronto

In September 2019, Heil released her debut studio album Ya, Yana onto YouTube. The album included eight songs, and was commercially released the following month. In January 2020, Heil was announced to be competing in Vidbir 2020, the Ukrainian national selection for the Eurovision Song Contest 2020 in Rotterdam. Her song "Vegan" qualified to the final, where it finished in sixth place.

Heil participated again in Vidbir in December 2022 with her song "When God Shut the Door", competing to represent Ukraine in the Eurovision Song Contest 2023. She finished in third place.

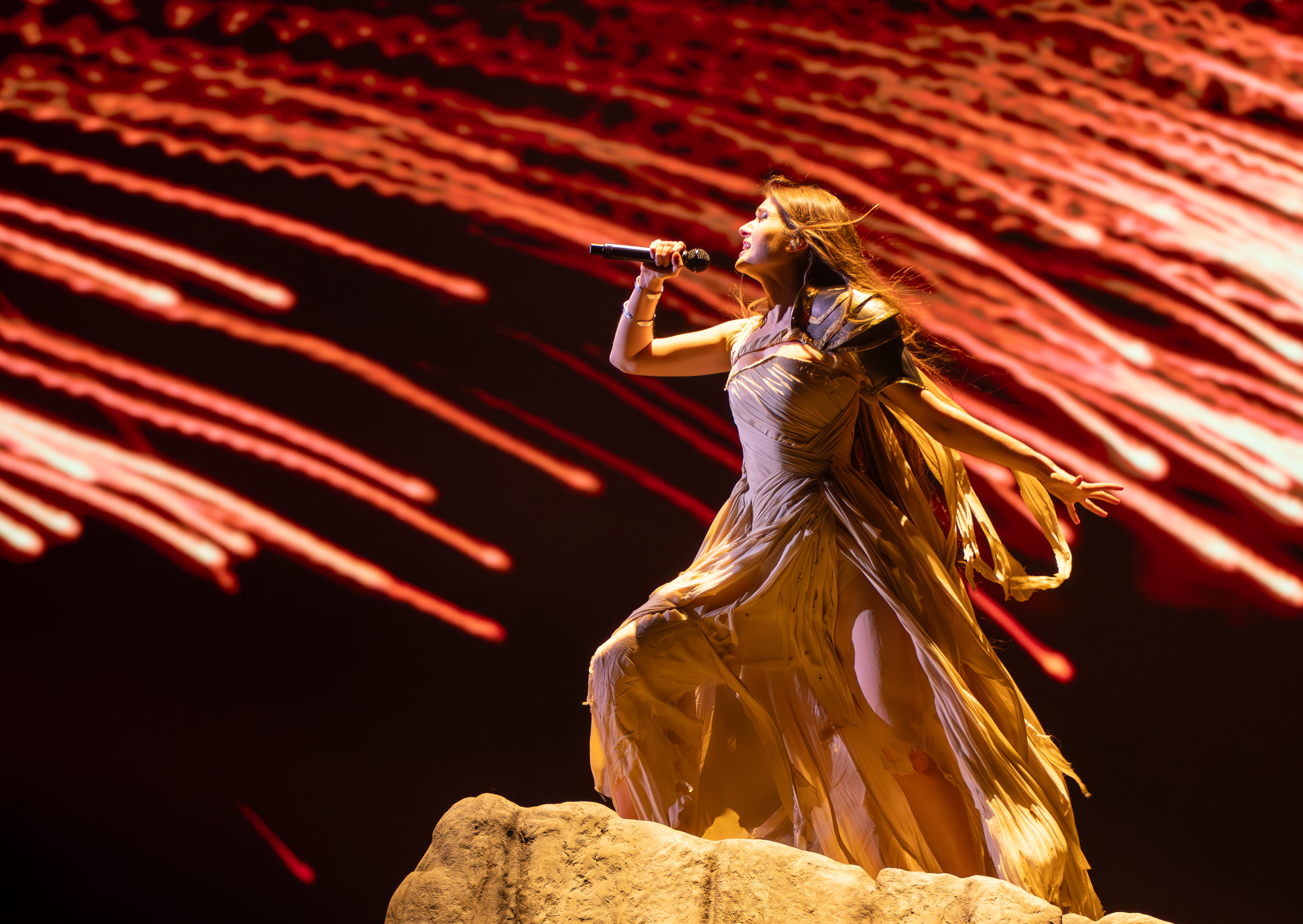
Performing at the Eurovision Song Contest 2024 with Alyona Alyona

She and Alyona Alyona were selected among the finalists of Vidbir 2024 with the song "Teresa & Maria". They went on to win the final on 4 February 2024, earning the right to represent Ukraine in the Eurovision Song Contest 2024. They qualified from the first semi-final on 7 May and placed 3rd in the Grand Final on 11 May with 453 points. Heil on May 2, 2025, released a new album called "АРХЕТИПИ" (ARCHETYPES), featuring 16 songs, with "З якого ти поверху неба?" (Which Floor of Heaven Are You From?) with Yarmak being the most popular song of the album, having 4.5 million plays on Spotify and 10 million views for the lyric video on YouTube. On May 16, 2025, together with the band Within Temptation, they released a joint song “Sing Like A Siren”. Later in 2025, Heil released the singles “Додай гучності (12 points)”, “Earth (Dradada)”, and “HORA” with Romanian singer Irina Rimes. . On January 12 2026, she released the single "Catharticus (Prayer)". Shortly after, on April 17, 2026, she released "Catharticus (Greek Version)" featuring Greek singer Klavdia, which was recorded following the original track's commercial success and viral popularity in Greece.On the 5/6/2026, she released a new single, “Dark Disco”.

On 4 April 2026, Jerry Heil performed the sold-out concert Jerelo (Ukrainian: «Джерело», lit. "Stream") at the Palace of Sports in Kyiv. The show was directed by Ukrainian music video director Alan Badoev. During the concert, Heil performed orchestral arrangements of her songs accompanied by the President's Orchestra of Ukraine. Referring to the venue's name, she remarked, "I don't want to make sport out of music," and symbolically referred to the Palace of Sports as the "Palace of Music" for the evening. During the approximately three-hour event, more than US$900,000 was raised in support of the Armed Forces of Ukraine.

== Controversies ==
In May 2024, before the final of the Eurovision Song Contest 2024, Jerry Heil was criticized by some Internet users after social media users drew attention to an earlier video from her TikTok profile in which she wore a sweatshirt bearing the inscription "Banderaciaga".

The name "Banderaciaga" was a play on words combining the surname of Stepan Bandera with the name of the fashion house Balenciaga, and referred to a collection by the Ukrainian brand Hype Laboratories. The matter prompted negative reactions due to historical associations with Bandera, OUN-B and the UPA, as well as the memory of crimes committed against the Polish population in Volhynia and Eastern Galicia.

== Personal life ==
She is Christian and vegan.

Heil is fluent in Ukrainian, Russian, and English. Most of her songs are recorded in Ukrainian.

=== Copyright infringement ===
In August 2018, publishing company Komp Music Publishing– the licensee of Universal Music Group in Ukraine – threatened a lawsuit against Heil for her unauthorized usage of the song "Believer" by Imagine Dragons in one of her videos. The company then insisted that all Universal Music Group songs included on Heil's channel must be removed and demanded a fine of several thousand Ukrainian hryvnias for violating copyright laws. The company launched two lawsuits against Heil, which resulted Heil's channel being removed from YouTube.

AIR Music, a partner of Heil, took up the case. In a meeting between representatives from both companies, they negotiated a deal where Heil's fines were substantially lowered, and an agreement was reached regarding how many copyright infringements Heil had committed. Komp Music Publishing subsequently withdrew their lawsuits, and Heil's channel was restored.

== Discography ==
=== Studio albums ===
Title	Details
Ya Yana	Released: 4 October 2019; Label: Best Music; Format: Digital download, streaming
Mandaryny i oleni	Released: 17 December 2021; Label: Best Music; Format: Digital download, streaming
Arkhetypy	Released: 2 May 2025; Label: Nova Music; Format: Digital download, streaming

=== Extended plays ===
Title	Details
De mii dim	Released: 27 October 2017; Label: Vidlik Records; Format: Digital download, streaming
Osobyste	Released: 9 April 2021; Label: Vidlik Records; Format: Digital download, streaming
Dai Boh (with Alyona Alyona)	Released: 26 August 2022; Label: Columbia / ENKO; Formats: Digital download, streaming
Maria	Released: 11 July 2024; Label: Nova Music; Formats: Digital download, streaming

=== Singles ===
==== As lead artist ====
Title	Year	Peak chart positions								Album or EP
Title	Year	UKR Air.	FIN	IRE	LTU	NLD	SWE	UK	WW Excl. US	Album or EP
"Okhrana otmiena"	2019	—	—	—	—	—	—	—	—	Ya yana
"Vilna kasa"	2019	69	—	—	—	—	—	—	—	Ya yana
"Vichnist'"	2019	—	—	—	—	—	—	—	—	Non-album singles
"Vegan"	2020	186	—	—	—	—	—	—	—	Non-album singles
"Nebeibi"	2020	—	—	—	—	—	—	—	—	Non-album singles
"Provinciia"	2020	—	—	—	—	—	—	—	—	Non-album singles
"Bloher"	2020	—	—	—	—	—	—	—	—	Non-album singles
"Bomba raketa pushka hranata"	2020	14	—	—	—	—	—	—	—	Non-album singles
"Aryfmetyka kokhannia"	2021	—	—	—	—	—	—	—	—	Non-album singles
"Lullaby (Kolyskova)"	2021	—	—	—	—	—	—	—	—	Osobyste
"Plaksa" (with Anna Trincher)	2021	103	—	—	—	—	—	—	—	Non-album singles
"Tuk Tuk Tuk"	2021	—	—	—	—	—	—	—	—	Non-album singles
"ZDN"	2021	—	—	—	—	—	—	—	—	Non-album singles
"Eksa v hivevei" (with Anna Trincher)	2021	54	—	—	—	—	—	—	—	Non-album singles
"Oleni" (with Tik)	2021	167	—	—	—	—	—	—	—	Mandaryny i oleni
"Poshta"	2022	178	—	—	—	—	—	—	—	Non-album singles
"Moskal nekrasivyi" (featuring Verka Serduchka)	2022	15	—	—	—	—	—	—	—	Non-album singles
"Razom do peremohy" (with Olya Polyakova and Dorofeeva, featuring various artists)	2022	—	—	—	—	—	—	—	—	Non-album singles
"V pustii kimnati" (with Yaktak)	2022	63	—	—	—	—	—	—	—	Non-album singles
"Mriia"	2022	84	—	—	—	—	—	—	—	Non-album singles
"Kokhaitesia chornobryvi"	2022	—	—	—	—	—	—	—	—	Non-album singles
"Dushevna pa-damashniemu" (with Emdivity and Lesia Nikitiuk)	2022	—	—	—	—	—	—	—	—	Non-album singles
"Viter viie" (with Alyona Alyona and Gedz)	2022	—	—	—	—	—	—	—	—	Dai Boh
"Dai Boh" (with Alyona Alyona and Monika Liu)	2022	190	—	—	—	—	—	—	—	Dai Boh
"Zozulia" (with Alyona Alyona and Ginger Mane)	2022	—	—	—	—	—	—	—	—	Dai Boh
"Nesestry" (with Mama)	2022	—	—	—	—	—	—	—	—	Non-album singles
"Tato"	2022	—	—	—	—	—	—	—	—	Non-album singles
"Kozatskomu rodu"	2022	88	—	—	—	—	—	—	—	Non-album singles
"Posmakuj" (with Alyona Alyona and Trill Pem)	2022	—	—	—	—	—	—	—	—	Non-album singles
"When God Shut the Door"	2022	—	—	—	—	—	—	—	—	Non-album singles
"Ekzamen" (with Alyona Alyona)	2022	—	—	—	—	—	—	—	—	Non-album singles
"Bronia" (with Ochman)	2023	—	—	—	—	—	—	—	—	Testament
"Na nebi ni zori"	2023	—	—	—	—	—	—	—	—	Non-album singles
"Stiny" (with Kalush)	2023	—	—	—	—	—	—	—	—	Non-album singles
"Blahoslovenna zemlja"	2023	—	—	—	—	—	—	—	—	Non-album singles
"Try polosy"	2023	54	—	—	—	—	—	—	—	Non-album singles
"Shchedra nich" (with Alyona Alyona and Kola)	2023	91	—	—	—	—	—	—	—	Non-album singles
"Malanka"	2023	—	—	—	—	—	—	—	—	Non-album singles
"Teresa & Maria" (with Alyona Alyona)	2024	1	14	55	2	68	30	100	130	Maria
"Podolyanochka (Get Up)" (with Alyona Alyona)	2024	—	—	—	—	—	—	—	—	Non-album singles
"Huby u hubakh" (with Volodymyr Dantes)	2024	14	—	—	—	—	—	—	—	Non-album singles
"#AllEyesOnKids"	2024	—	—	—	—	—	—	—	—	Non-album singles
"Wabi-Sabi" (with Julia Sanina)	2024	—	—	—	—	—	—	—	—	Non-album singles
"Snih"	2024	—	—	—	—	—	—	—	—	Arkhetypy
"Rozchynyayus'" (featuring Evgeny Khmara)	2025	—	—	—	—	—	—	—	—	Arkhetypy
"Vymolyv" (with Monatik featuring Evgeny Khmara)	2025	—	—	—	—	—	—	—	—	Arkhetypy
"Doday huchnosti (12 Points)"	2025	8	—	—	—	—	—	—	—	Non-album singles
"Earth (Dradada)"	2025	—	—	—	—	—	—	—	—	Non-album singles
"Hora" (with Irina Rimes)	2025	—	—	—	—	—	—	—	—	Non-album singles
"Catharticus (Prayer)"	2026	28	—	—	—	—	—	—	—	Non-album singles
"Pryvit. Hello"	2026	—	—	—	—	—	—	—	—	Non-album singles
"Dark Disco"	2026	—	—	—	—	—	—	—	—	Non-album singles
"—" denotes a recording that did not chart or was not released in that territory.

==== As featured artist ====
Title	Year	Peak chart positions	Album or EP
Title	Year	UKR	Album or EP
"Khvyli" (Kalush featuring Jerry Heil)	2021	80	Non-album singles
"Ridni moi" (Alyona Alyona featuring Jerry Heil)	2022	7	Non-album singles
"Chomu?" (Alyona Alyona featuring Jerry Heil)	2022	54	Non-album singles
"Kupala" (Alyona Alyona featuring Jerry Heil and ela.)	2022	14	Dai Boh
"Toy denʹ (OE30 Edition)" (Okean Elzy featuring Yaktak, Kola, Shumei, and Jerry Heil)	2024	9	Non-album singles
"Sing Like a Siren" (Within Temptation featuring Jerry Heil)	2025	—	Non-album singles
"—" denotes a recording that did not chart or was not released in that territory.

=== Other charted songs ===
Title	Year	Peak chart positions	Album or EP
Title	Year	UKR	Album or EP
"Z yakoho ty poverkhu neba?" (with Yarmak)	2025	27	Arkhetypy

=== Music videos ===
Video	Year
"Vilna kasa"	2019
"Bomba raketa pushka hranata"	2020
"Tuk Tuk Tuk"	2021
"ZDN"	2021
"Ridni moi"	2022
"Mriia"	2022
"Chomu?"	2022
"Kupala"	2022
"Kokhaitesia chornobryvi"	2022
"Dai Boh"	2022
"Nesestry"	2022
"Tato"	2022
"Posmakuj"	2022
"Kozatskomu rodu"	2022
"Ekzamen"	2022
"Bronia"	2023
"Na nebi ni zori"	2023
"Stiny"	2023
"Blahoslovenna zemlja"	2023
"Bracia"	2023
"Try polosy"	2023
"Shchedra nich"	2023
"Malanka"	2023
"Teresa & Maria"	2024
"Podolyanochka (Get Up)"	2024
"Virgin Maria"	2024
"Ave Maria"	2024
"Huby u hubakh"	2024
"#AllEyesOnKids"	2024
"Wabi-Sabi"	2024
"Snih"	2024
"Rozchynyayus"	2025
"Vymolyv"	2025
"Sing Like a Siren"	2025
"Love Me Hard"	2025
"Z yakoho ty poverkhu neba?"	2025
"Doday huchnosti (12 Points)"	2025
"Earth (Dradada)"	2025

== Filmography ==
Year	Title	Role	Notes
2002	ChalkZone	Rudy Tabootie	Ukrainian dub
2019	The Addams Family	Bethany	Ukrainian dub

== Awards and nominations ==
Year	Award	Category	Nominated work	Result	Ref.
2019	Jager Music Awards	Single of the Year	"Okhrana, otmiena"	Won	
2019	Choice Viva!	Оpening Viva!		Won	
2020	YUNA	Best Song	"Okhrana, otmiena"	Won	
2020	YUNA	Best Female Performer		Nominated	
2020	YUNA	Discovery of the Year		Nominated	
2021	YUNA	Best Performer		Nominated	
2023	MME Awards	Public Choice award		Won	
2024	Eurovision Awards	Best Artistic Vision	Herself (with Alyona Alyona)	Won	

Awards and achievements
Preceded by Tvorchi with "Heart of Steel"	Ukraine in the Eurovision Song Contest (with Alyona Alyona); 2024	Succeeded by Ziferblat with "Bird of Pray"
