= Tulym =

Ukrainian hip hop group

Tulym (ТУЛИМ) / TULYM POSSE
- Origin: Kyiv, Ukraine
- Genres: Hip hop Ukrainian Hip Hop
- Years active: 2008–present
- Members: KyLЯ; RYLEZ
- Website: www.tulym.bandcamp.com

Tulym (Ukrainian: Тулим) —⁣ Ukrainian hip hop group from Kyiv, Ukraine composed of KyLЯ and RYLEZ. They began writing music in early 2007. At the same time, they are purchased in Hip-Hop Ejay. Later it was replaced by FL Studio. After that, in 2008 KyLЯ and RYLEZ created «Tulym». In the autumn of the same year, they began their first performances in Ukraine. In December 2009 they presented their debut album — «0,5». Three years later (April 8, 2012) guys appeared their second album — «Chronology» (Ukrainian: Хронологія). June 14, 2014 Tulym held a concert in the Tallinn, Estonia. April 18, 2015 they had a concert with legendary hip-hop band from New York City⁣ — ⁣Onyx in Sofia, Bulgaria.

== Members ==
=== Current members ===
- KyLЯ (Beatmaker, МС)
- RYLEZ (МС)

== Discography ==
- 2009: «0,5»
- 2012: «Chronology»
- 2016: «NETRIpanyna»
