= ProBass and Hardi =

Ukrainian musical group

- Origin: Kremenchuk, Ukraine
- Genres: Ukrainian folk music; electronic dance music
- Years active: 2017–present
- Members: See below

ProBass and Hardi (commonly styled as PROBASS ∆ HARDI) is a Ukrainian music group. The band's signature song is Good Evening (Where Are You From?).

== Career ==
ProBass and Hardi was formed in the city of Kremenchuk in 2017. In the early years, many hits were released that occupied the top positions of the charts of Ukrainian radio stations, entered the tops of Shazam and streaming services. "Indy", "Asha", "NAJA-NAJA" can still be heard in the concert program on a par with new tracks. The band began giving concerts and headlined at the festivals "RADIO DAY" (2019), "RED BULL FESTIVAL" (2019), "SOLOMAFEST" (2019), "RADIO DAY" together with NAONI (2021), "ATLAS WEEKEND" (2021) and in October 2021 released its main track "Good Evening (Where Are You From?)".

The phrase, later widely quoted by governors, millions of citizens, the military and even the president of Ukraine, was originally said by Marko Galanevych, leader of the band DakhaBrakha, during a concert in the United States, with his permission a fragment that was included in the track was used.

After the Russian military invasion in 2022, the track flew around the world and became a symbol of Ukraine's invincibility. It has now garnered fifteen million views and inspired almost 800,000 people to create videos on TikTok. At the beginning of the full-scale war, the band wanted to put their creativity on pause, but seeing how music can support the military, volunteers and refugees, they decided to do everything for victory with the help of songs. Therefore, later they released "Nastane Den" and "Kozaky Ydut" - collaborations with the young singer Anna Bulat, who became a member of the band, and a collaboration with KHAYAT "Do Boyu", as well as a solo nostalgic track "Govorit Kyiv". The singles have garnered millions of views and still hold high positions in the Ukrainian charts.

The band began touring with charity concerts collecting aid for the Armed Forces of Ukraine and refugees throughout Ukraine and Europe. As part of the charity tour, performances took place at the concerts "100 Days of Invincibility of Ukraine", the first concert in Kyiv since the beginning of the war, the charity show "I am with you" that was shown on the air of the telethon, at the "Metronome" festival in Prague, the "ATLAS #RashaGoodbye" festival (2022), and gave solo charity concerts in Poland, Lviv, Chernivtsi, Kyiv, Kremenchuk, Kalush, etc., the band also gave a charity concert in the Dnipro metro at the "Vokzalna" station. On Independence Day, the concert "Ukraine Fights" was held on the air of the telethon, where the band performed together with NAONI and the ballet. Millions of dollars in aid were raised at charity concerts with the band's participation. On 28 July, on Ukrainian Statehood Day, Ukrposhta presented the stamp and envelopes "Good Evening (Where Are You From?)", and the band performed at the stamp redemption on Mykhailivska Square in Kyiv. On the Independence Day of Ukraine in 2022, the band presented an updated version of “Good evening, we are from Ukraine” together with the NAONI folk instrument orchestra and the first official video clip for this track.

== Members ==
- PROBASS (Artem Tkachenko) - frontman
- Artem Radionov - guitar
- Olexandr Karas - guitar
- Yevhen Dashchenko - drummer
- Danilo Plahotnikov - sound engineer
- Anna Bulat
- Timofiy Polezhako

== Discography ==
Name	Release date	Notes
Indy	2017	5th place in "Chart Top 100" and 1st-place in «Hit Top 40» on Kiss FM
We takin' over	2017	
The Boss	2018	
TRU Concept — Save Me (PROBASS ∆ HARDI REMIX)	2018	1st place in "Hit Top 40" on Kiss FM
Asha	2019	Shazam Top 10 Ukraine, 1st place in "Top 10 dance" and "Hit Top 40" on Kiss FM
Naja-naja	2019	Shazam Top 200 Ukraine
Sara	2019	Shazam Top 200 Ukraine
Good Evening (Where Are You From?)	29.10.2021	
Козаки йдуть (feat. Anna Bulat)	26.02.2022	
Настане день (feat. Anna Bulat)	04.04.2022	
До бою (feat. Khayat)	13.05.2022	
Говорить Київ	08.07.2022	
Доброго вечора, ми з України (feat. НАОНІ)	24.08.2022	
