= Oleksandr Yarmak =

Ukrainian rapper (born 1991)

Yarmak Олександр Ярмак
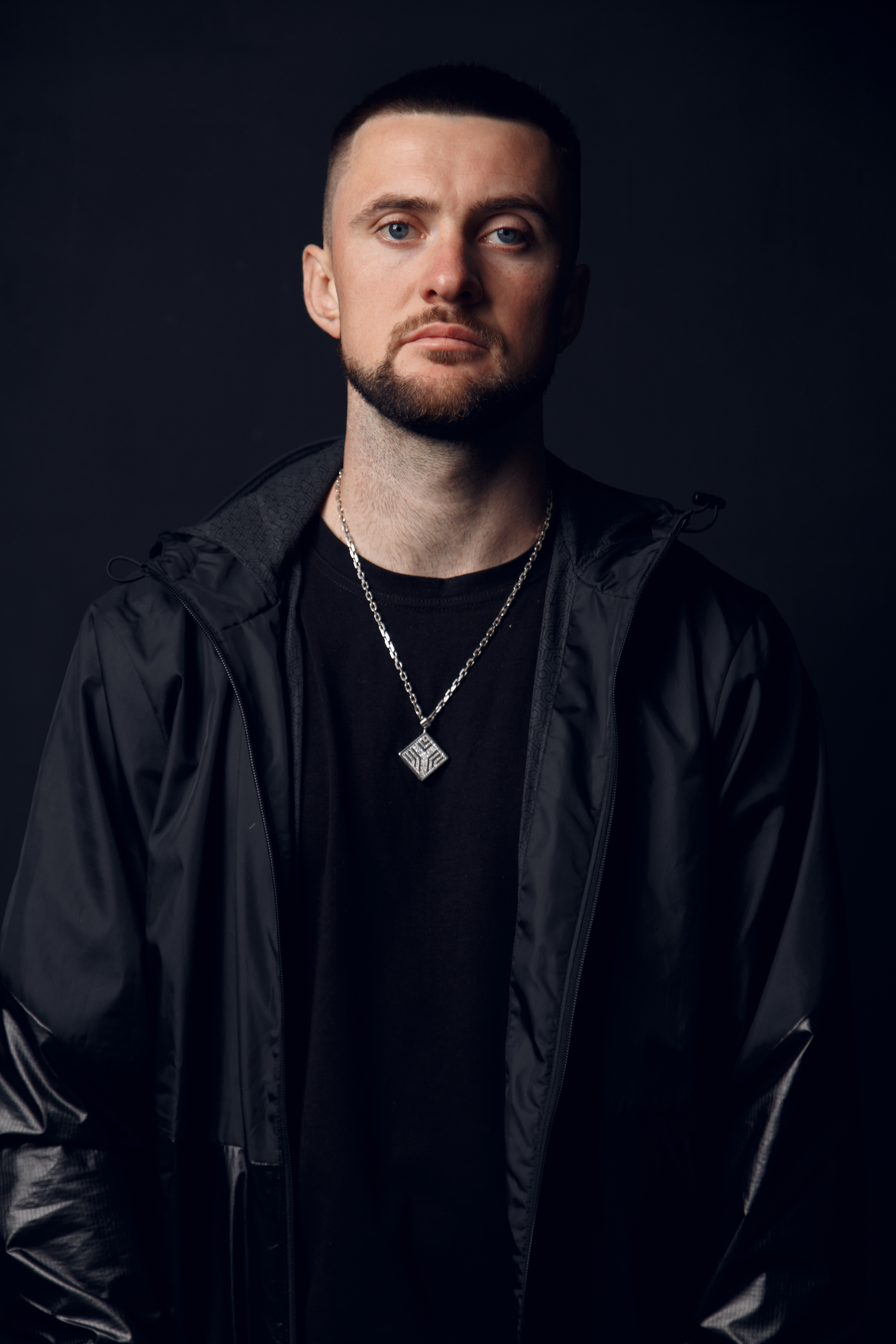
- Yarmak in 2021

Background information
- Born: Oleksandr Valentynovych Yarmak; 24 October 1991 (age 35); Boryspil, Ukraine
- Origin: Kyiv, Ukraine
- Genres: Hip hop; pop
- Occupations: Singer; rapper
- Years active: 2011–present
- Label: Yarmak Music
- Website: yarmakmusic.com

Oleksandr Yarmak (Ukrainian: Олександр Валентинович Ярмак, born 24 October 1991) is a Ukrainian singer and rapper. Yarmak performs songs in both Russian and Ukrainian. The themes of his songs range from humor and love to social injustice. Yarmak has also appeared in the serial Yak hartuvavsya Style.

== Career ==
In the summer of 2011, Oleksandr started publishing his tracks on VK, and later they were released on YouTube. In December that year he released his first music video, which reached more than 50,000 views in one night and a million within two weeks. During 2012, Yarmak presented several more successful music videos and a full-length album. In 2013, the musician supported protests in defense of the rights of Pavlichenko and wrote the song "Freedom to honest" on this topic.

Oleksandr also paid considerable attention to live performances, visiting numerous cities of Ukraine.

In 2013, the music video for the song "Serdze pazana" became the leader of views among of all Russian-speaking artists on YouTube, additionally, the portal "New Rap" nominated the music video as "Video of the Year". The second album of the artist was presented the same year.

On 26 October 2013 “NLO” TV channel launched the 24-episode comedy "Yak hartuvavsya Style", which shows the life and development of Oleksandr Yarmak. On 24 October 2014 the 2nd season of the series was released.

Yarmak took a part in the events of the Euromaidan and the confrontations on Hrushevsky Street. In February 2014, along with MC TOF (Andriy Tofetsky), he released a music video "22", which successfully combined patriotic lyrics and hip-hop. For this video Yarmak collected documentary videos from Euromaidan events and edited them. The song gained popularity and became widely known.

On 21 March 2015 the third studio album "Made in UA" was presented on social networks.

On 7 April 2017 he released his fourth album "Restart", which included 16 songs. In particular, the first Ukrainian song called "Tvoi sny".

On 11 November 2017 Yarmak celebrated his five years of activity, making the first big show in one of the biggest Kyiv's concert arena STEREOPLAZA.

On 6 December 2018, the Day of the Armed Forces of Ukraine, Yarmak and Ukrainian singer Svitlana Tarabarova released a song "VOIN", which was dedicated to the Ukrainian military.

On 22 August 2021 he released a video for the song "Potriben zhyvym", dedicated to living legends of Ukraine. Starring Serhiy Zhadan, Yevheniy Yanovych, Denys Bihus, Oleksandr Polozhynskyi, Oleh Mykhailyuta (Fahot), Oleksandr Sydorenko (Fozzy), Svitlana Tarabarova, Valerii Markus, Vitaliy Deineha, Maksym Yermokhin, Zhan Beleniuk and Denys Berinchyk.

During the 2022 Russian invasion of Ukraine, Yarmak joined the Territorial Defense Forces, which is a part of the Armed Forces of Ukraine.

== Discography ==
Album	Year	Format	Label
YaSIutuba (I'm from YouTube)	2012	Album	Yarmak Music
Vtoroi albom (Second album)	2013	Album	Yarmak Music
Horod Svobody (Stolnyi hrad album, City of Freedom)	2014	Album	Stolnyi hrad
Made in UA	2015	Album	
Restart	2017	Album	
Red Line	2020	Album	
