= Vopli Vidopliassova discography =

This is the complete discography of Ukrainian rock band Vopli Vidopliassova.

== Studio albums ==
- 1994 - Kraina Mriy
- 1997 - Muzika
- 2000 - Hvyli Amura
- 2002 - Fayno
- 2006 - Buly denky
- 2013 - Chudovy svit

== Live albums ==
- 1992 - Abo abo
- 1995 - Zakustyka
- 2008 - VV na sceni festivalju "ROK-SICH"
- 2008 - VV na sceni festivalju "ROK-SICH" (2CD collectors edition, full performance)

== Singles ==
- 1996 - Muzika
- 1998 - Lyubov
- 2001 - Den NaroDJennya
- 2001 - Mamay
- 2008 - Gimn-Slaven Ukraini
- 2008 - Lado (virtual single)
- 2009 - Lado (maxi-single)
- 2009 - Chio Chio San
- 2010 - Vidpustka

== Unofficial releases ==
- 1987 - Hai zhyve VV!
- 1988 - Pershyy koncert v Moskvi
- 1989 - Zv'yazok
- 1989 - Tantsi
- 1991 - Hey, O.K
- 1995 - Zhittya v Bordo
- 1996 - Salzburg
- 1998 - ArhiVV 1988-1998
- 1998 - Nenovye russkie (pesni) 1986-1994

== DVDs ==
- 2007 - Video Collection
- 2008 - Video Collection (collectors edition)
- 2011 - VV na sceni festivalju "ROK-SICH"

== Compilations ==
- 2004 - Naikrashche
- 2007 - Zbirka Etnichna
- 2007 - Zbirka Rokova
- 2007 - Zbirka Romantichna
- 2007 - Zbirka Tantsyuvalna
- 2012 - Sim albomiv gurtu Vopli Vidopliassova

== Participation in collections ==
- Budzma! Tuzin. Perazagruzka-2 (2011), track “Краіна мрой”

== Music videos ==
- 1989 - Tantsi
- 1989 - Zv'yazok
- 1989 - Buli denki
- 1993 - Galyu pryhod
- 1996 - Muzika
- 1997 - Vesna
- 1998 - Lyubov
- 2000 - Den narodjennya
- 2000 - Buli na seli
- 2001 - Ne dumai
- 2001 - Den naroDJennya (DJ O'Skrypka Remix)
- 2002 - Svit
- 2002 - Polonina
- 2003 - Sonyachni dni
- 2003 - Zoryana osin
- 2006 - Pisenka
- 2006 - Koliskova
- 2006 - Katerina
- 2009 - Lado
- 2009 - Chio San
- 2010 - Vidpustka
- 2012 - Shchedryk
  - 2012 - Carol of the Bells

== Vinyl releases ==
- 1993 - Abo abo
- 2008 - Buli denki
- 2012 - VV na sceni festivalyu "ROK-SICH"
- 2013 - Kraina mriy (1997 remix)
- 2013 - Muzika
- 2013 - Hvyli Amura
