= Percha (disambiguation) =

Percha is a comune in South Tyrol, Italy.

Percha may also refer to:

- Percha (Starnberg), a district of Starnberg, Germany; a separate village until 1978
- Percha (Feldkirchen-Westerham), a district (Ortsteil) of Feldkirchen-Westerham, Germany
- Percha Creek, near Hillsboro, New Mexico, United States
- Percha Formation or Percha Shale, a geologic formation in New Mexico, United States
- Percha City, the original name of Kingston, New Mexico, United States
- Percha Island, a former name of Sumatra
- Percha a 2013 album by Ukrainian band Trystavisim

== See also ==
- Perchas, Puerto Rico
- Perca (disambiguation)
