= Trystavisim =

Ukrainian rock band

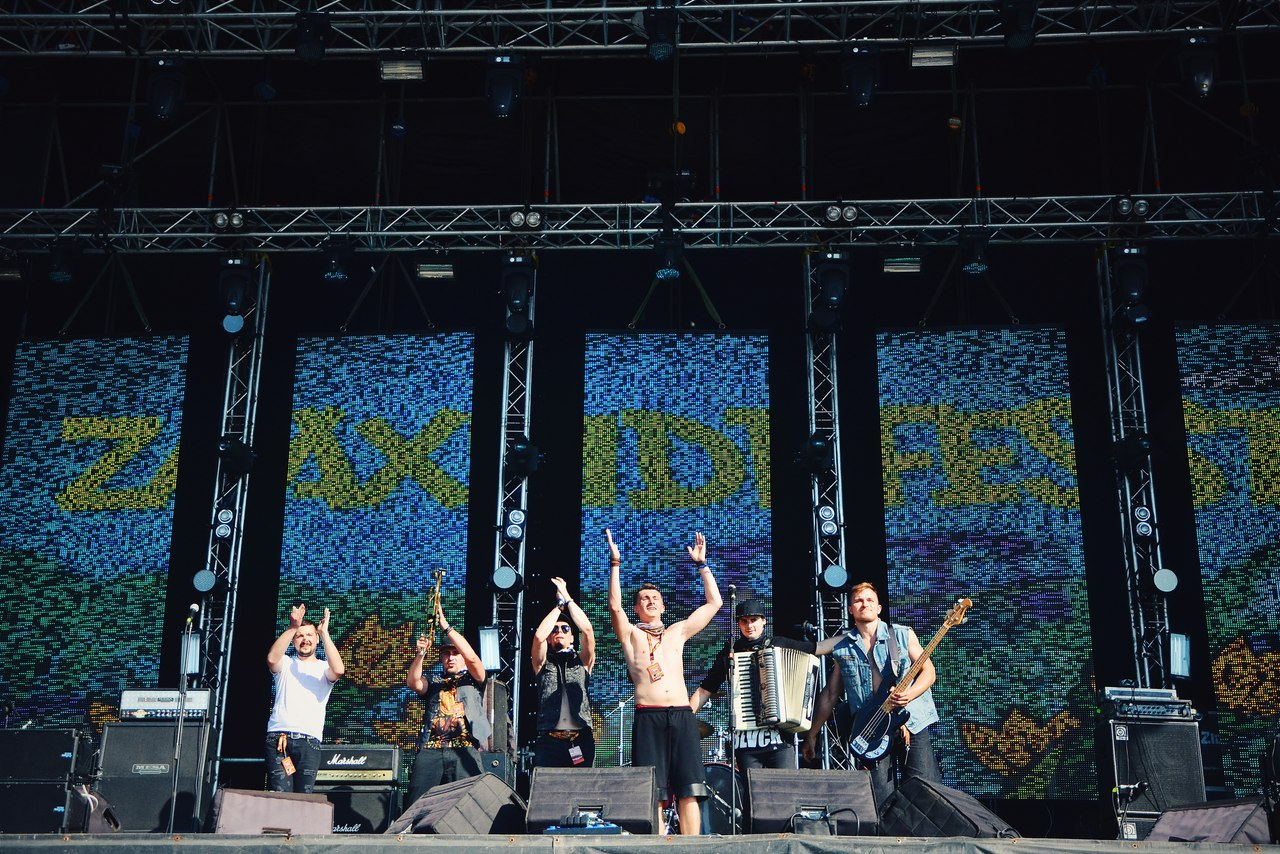

Background information
- Origin: Uzhhorod, Ukraine
- Genres: Folk rock; ska punk
- Years active: 2010–present
- Members: Pavlo Genov; Andriy Shapovalov; Igor Magada; Volodymyr Shchobak; Stanislav Mykultsya; Arsen Babichenko; Mikhail Vibes Kurtyak; Oleh Orieshnikov
- Past members: Sergey Elagin
- Website: www.trystavisim.com

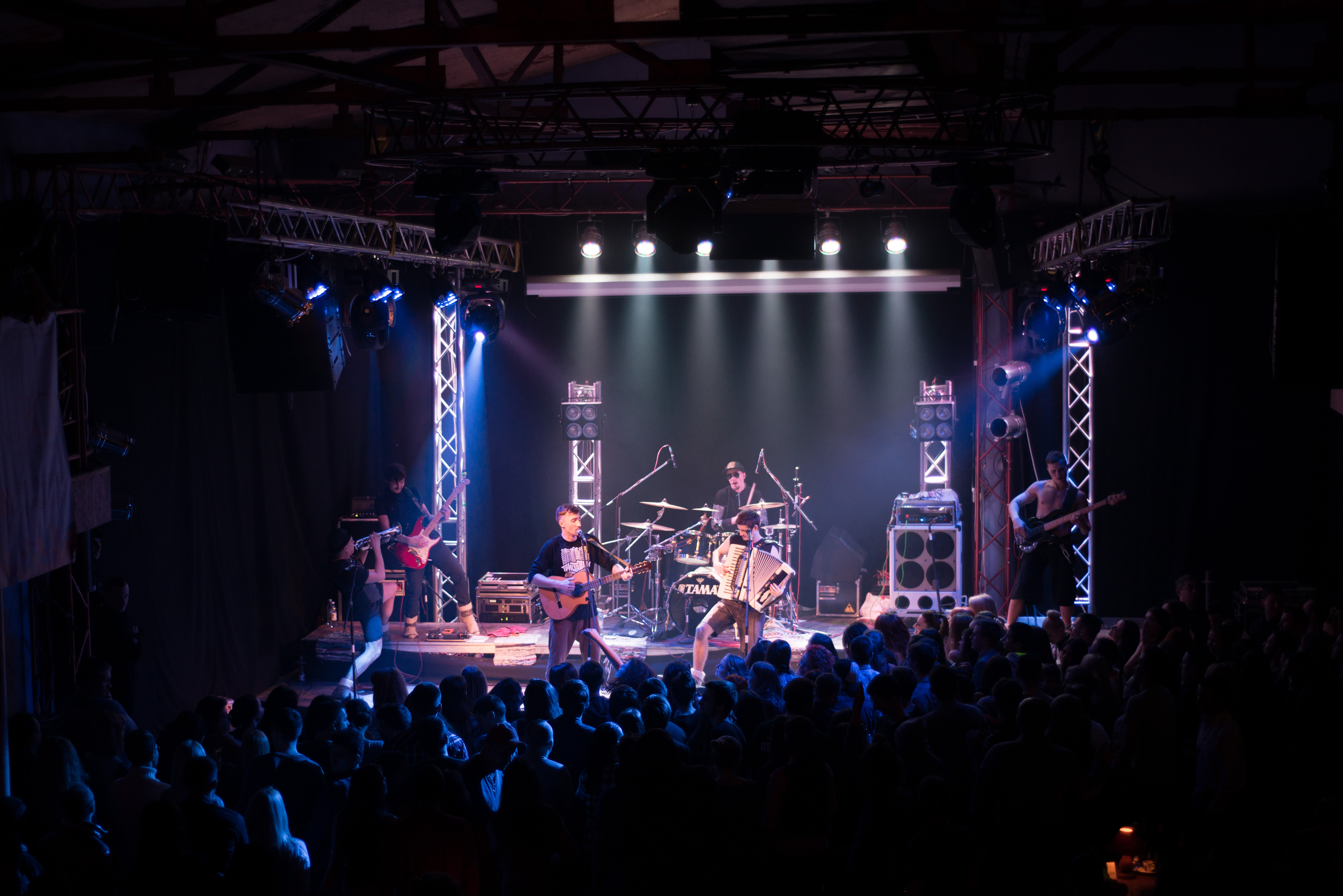
Presentation of «Latcho»

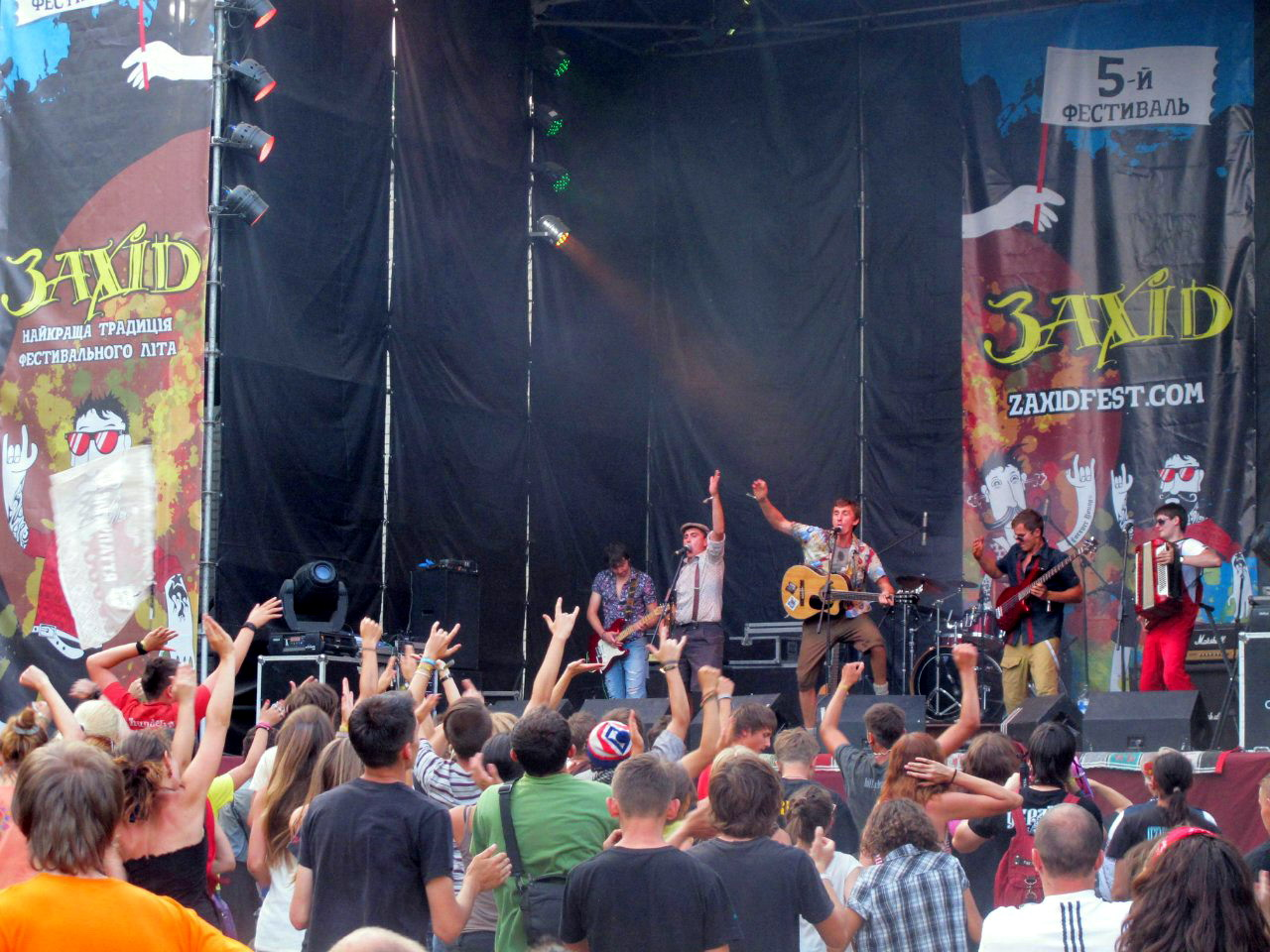
Zaxidfest-2013

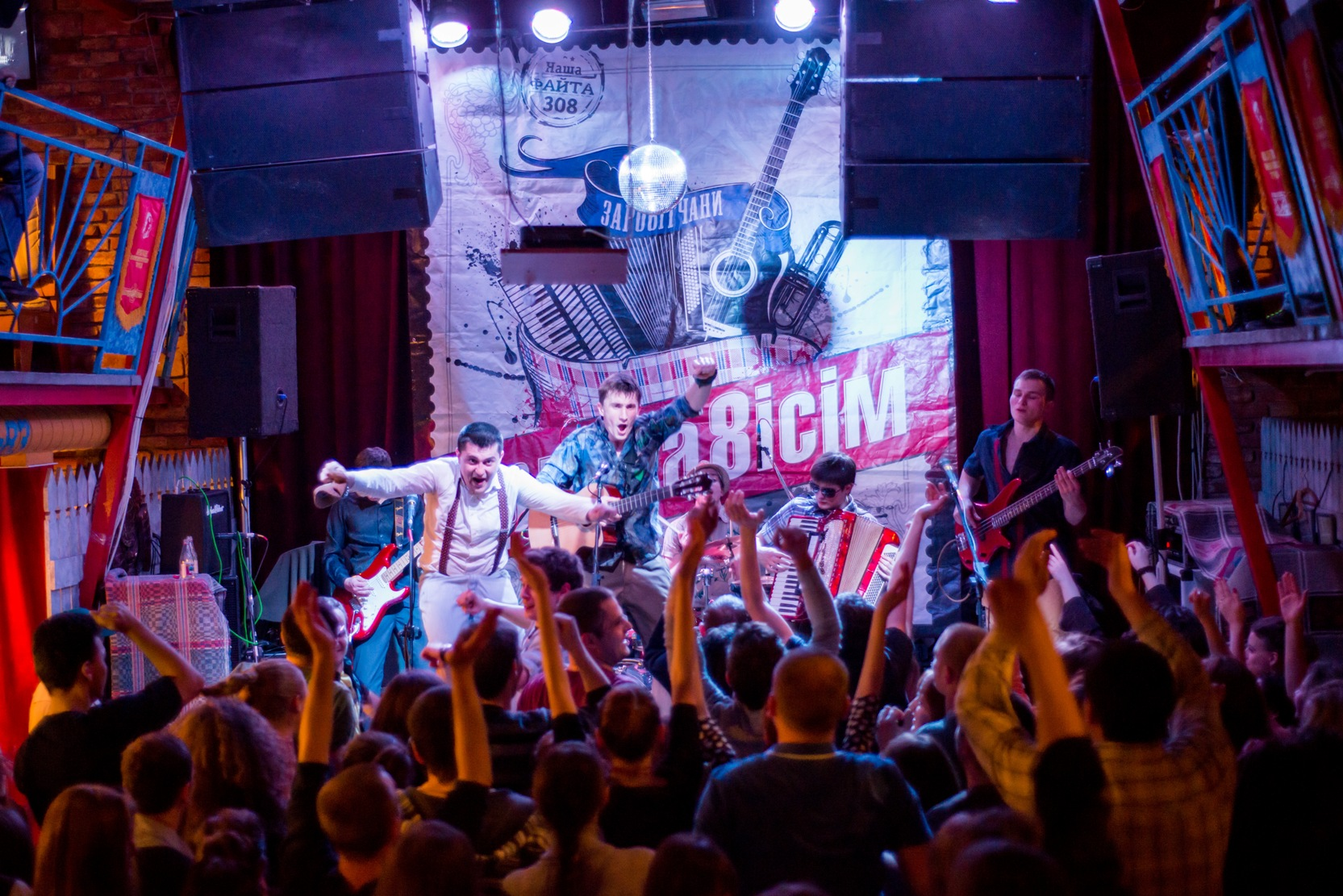
Presentation EP «Percha»

Trystavisim (Ukrainian: Триставісім, lit. 'Threehundredeight') – is a Ukrainian rock band from Uzhhorod, Zakarpattia, Ukraine.

== Description ==
The music played by a rock band is built on the basis of elements of folk-rock, punk, ska and is decorated with a colorful addition of forceful melodies. In general the style of the band can be described as folk punk.

== History ==
The first performance of the group was held in November 23, 2010 in Lviv in Nabutky Etnoclub and Lviv Art association Dzyga.

Over the next two years, the band toured with performances in almost every major city in Western Ukraine, having played more than 50 concerts (including the performance in one of the largest Ukrainian festivals of music and art, which is festival "Zahid").

On March 26, 2013 the band presented their debut mini-album (EP) called "Percha", which included 5 songs.

On March 31, 2013 the band took part in a radio project Tysa FM Live, doing online tracks live from the debut album.

Later "Trystavisim" was invited to take part in the filming of television programs on the first national TV channel (Folk-music) and TVI (Music for Adult with Maria Burmaka).

On August 13, 2013 was presented a debut video clip for the song called "Dyslocatsiya" which received approving reviews from music critics.

During the summer of 2013 the band performed on the vast majority of festivals in Ukraine, they received an unofficial status of "a discovery of summer festivals 2013 in Ukrainian music".

In spring 2014 the band announced the release of their debut full-length album, and subsequently announced his name. The record was called "LATCHO". In support of the album as part of the announced tour "Latcho Tour 2014 / Round 1" band played many concerts in Ukraine and abroad, visiting the festivals Kraina Mriy in Kyiv, which was founded by known Ukrainian musician Oleh Skrypka, Lemkowska watra in Zdynia (Poland), and Zahid.

January 27, 2015 the album "LATCHO" was officially released. February 12, 2015, the group published the official music video for one of the main songs from the album, the song Varosh banda. Then, in support of the album, band played two great concerts in Uzhhorod and Kyiv, February 27 and March 13, respectively.

In May, the group published an original animated video for the song Nasha faita and played many concerts in Ukraine and abroad during the festival season.

2016 announcement on the band's new EP and the release of two singles with videos. In March, a video Rangers was released, and already on April 22 the band presented his new program "Varoshska Tusa" via big concert in Uzhhorod. Subsequently, on June 7, was published scandalous video Varoshska Tusa, which has caused mixed reactions.

Currently band working on second album.

== Members ==
- Pavlo Genov – lead vocals
- Andriy Shapovalov – bass
- Igor Magada – drums
- Volodymyr Shchobak – trumpet, backing vocals
- Stanislav Mykultsya – accordion, backing vocals
- Arsen Babichenko – guitar, backing vocals
- Mikhail Kurtyak – Dj Vibes
- Oleh Orieshnikov – sound director

== Past members ==
- Sergey Elagin — guitar, backing vocals

== Discography ==
=== Singles ===
- December 2012 — "Dyslokatsiya" (Дислокація)
- January 2015 — "Transcarpathia" (Транскарпатія)

=== Albums ===
- March 2013 — Percha (Перча) [EP]
- January 2015 — Latcho (Лачо)

== Videography ==
- August, 2013 — Dyslocatsiya
- February, 2015 — Varosh banda
- May, 2015 — Nasha faita
- March, 2016 — Rangers
- June, 2016 — Varoshska tusa

== Festivals ==
- Music Bike Ukraine
- Goral Music Avia Bike Ukraine – 2012
- Zaxidfest – 2012
- Rurysko – 2013
- Music Bike Ukraine – 2013
- Pidkamin' — 2013
- Faine misto – 2013
- Franko-mission – 2013
- Zaxidfest – 2013
- Cheremosh – 2014
- Kraina Mriy – 2014
- Faine misto – 2014
- Lemkowska watra, Zdynia – 2014
- Zaxidfest – 2014
- Wild wild fest — 2015
- Ole Dovbush — 2015
- Kraina Mriy — 2015
- Faine misto – 2016
- Woodstock Ukraine— 2016
- Zaxidfest — 2016
- Obnova — 2016
- Dnister-fest — 2016
- Wild wild fest — 2016

== Sources ==
- varosh.com.ua
- Kyiv Rock Club
- umka.com
- notatky.com.ua
- www.mukachevo.net
- zakarpattya.net.ua
- nashe.com.ua
