= Earth pyramids of Ritten =

Hoodoos in South Tyrol, Italy

Coordinates: 46°33′09″N 11°28′13″E

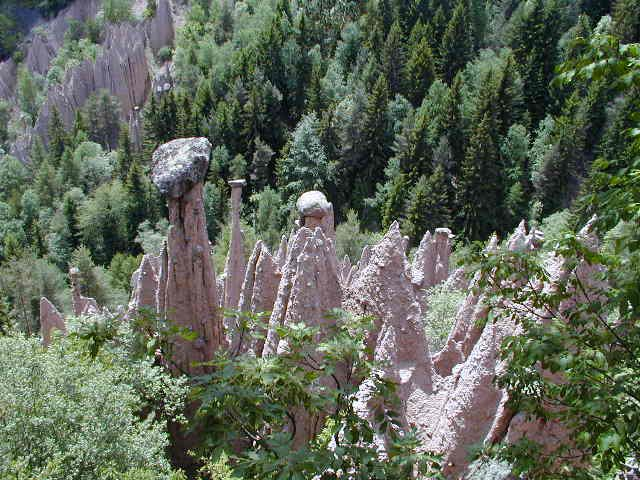
The earth pyramids of Ritten

The earth pyramids of Ritten (German: Erdpyramiden am Ritten; Italian: Piramidi di terra del Renon [piˈraːmidi di ˈtɛrra del reˈnon]) are a natural monument that is located on the Ritten, a plateau not far from Bolzano in northern Italy. Earth pyramids are a fairly widespread phenomenon that exist in various locations, such as South Tyrol and Platten.

The original name in this area for these earth pyramids is Lahntürme, i.e., landslide towers. They originate from glacial moraine rocks. The columns of the pyramids may be more or less elongated, and the higher they are, the thinner they get, ending usually with a stone cover. These earth pyramids are constantly evolving, continuously eroding, and will possibly collapse and make way for new formations.

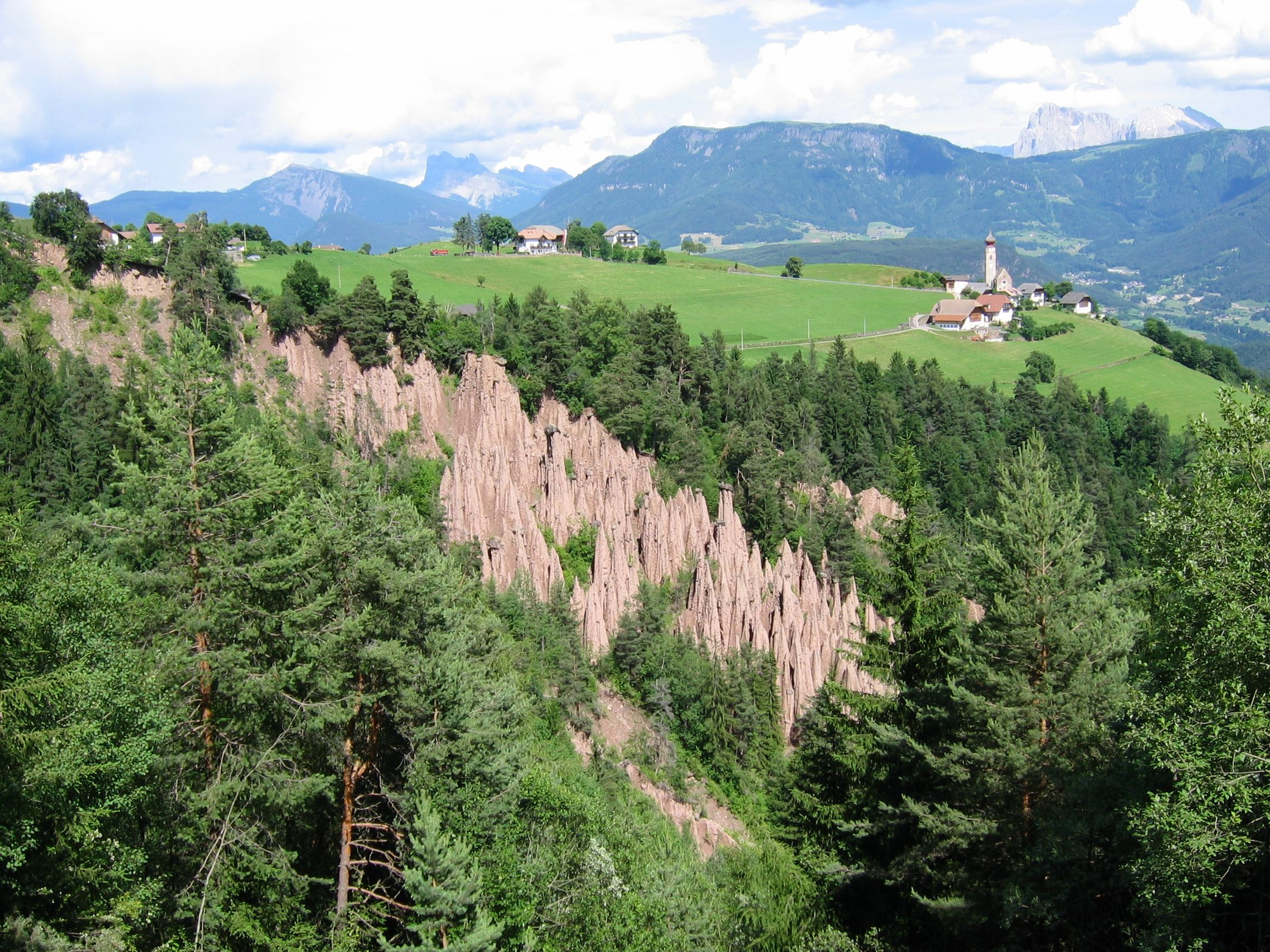
As seen from the west with Nicholas chapel and Dolomites

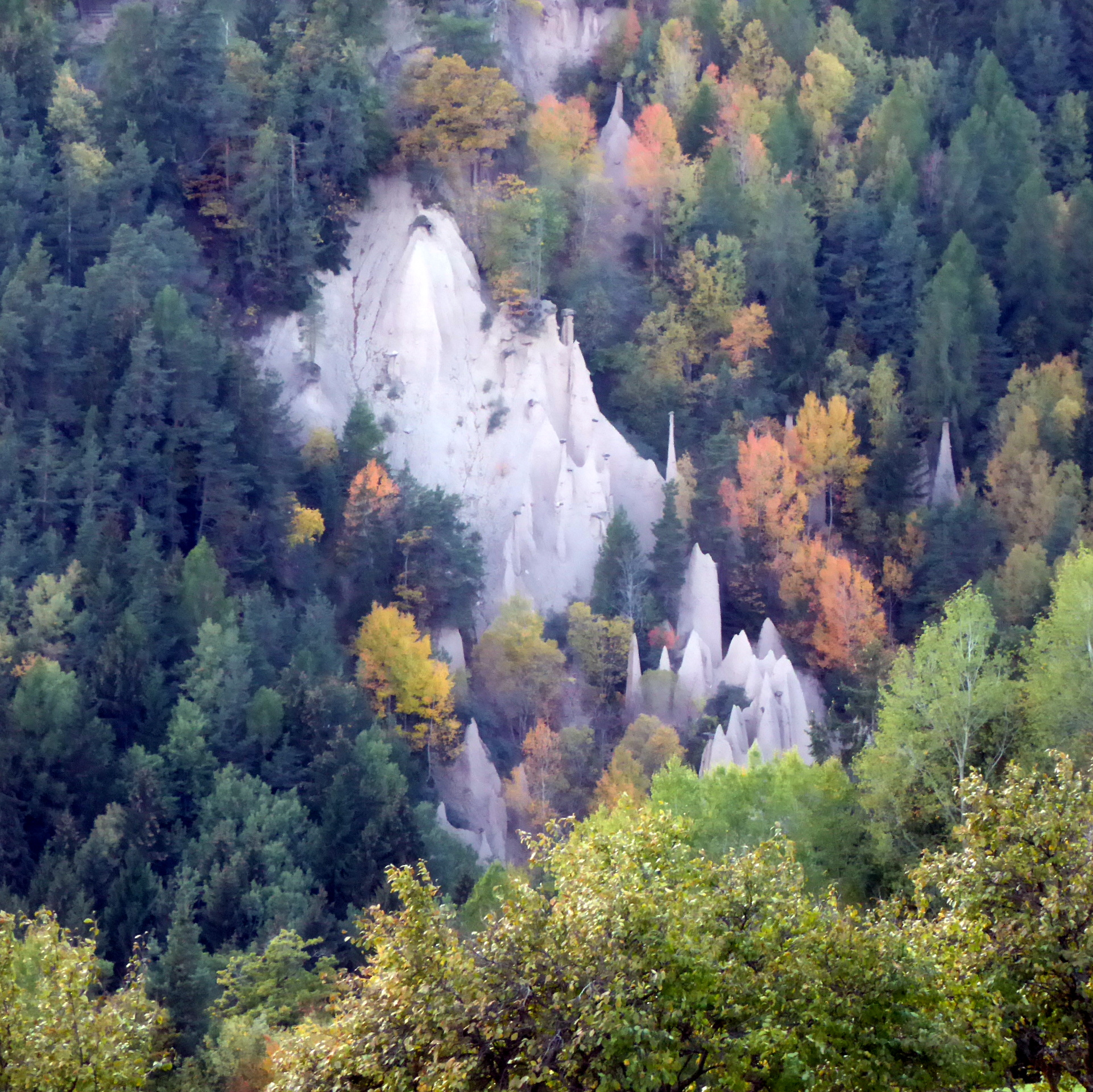
Pyramids in Autumn, as seen from Nicholas chapel

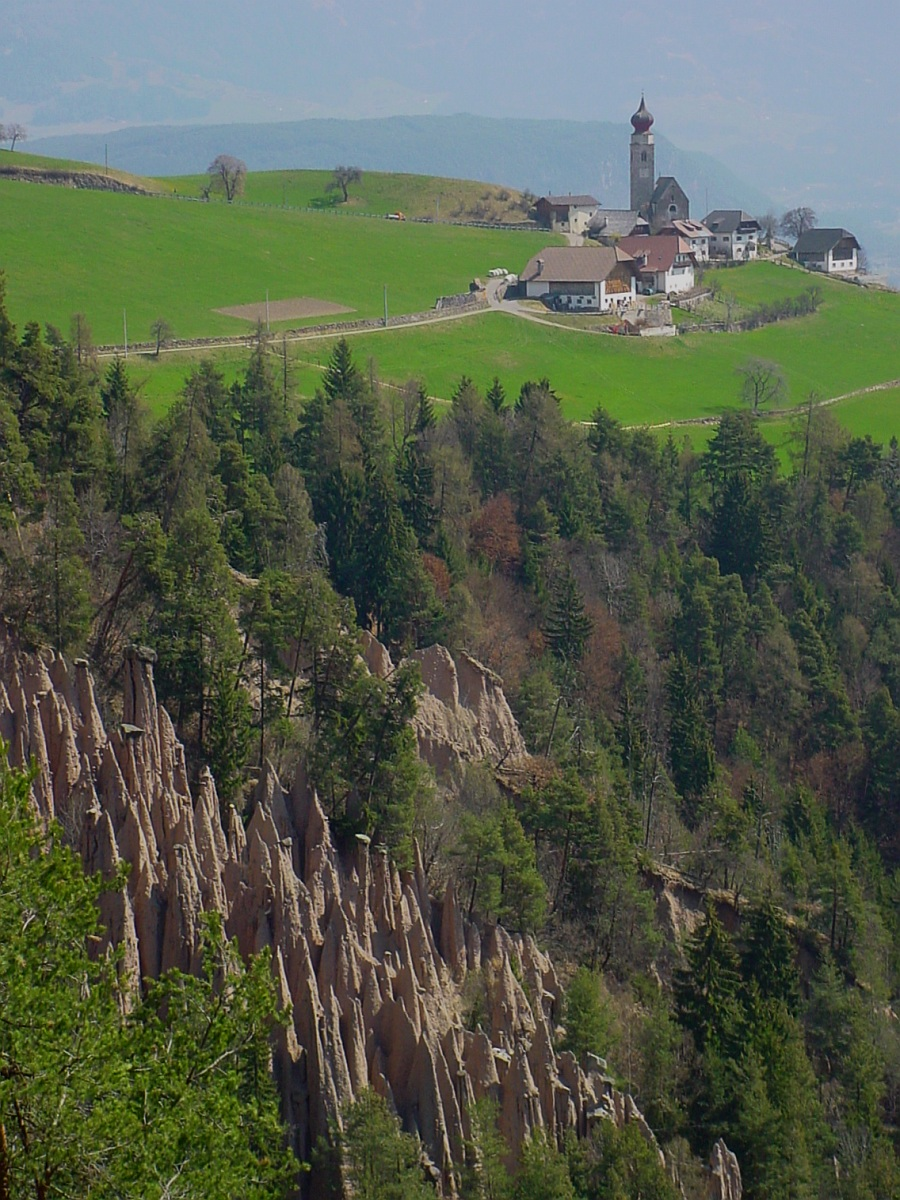
View of the Pyramids of the Ritten towards Mittelberg
