= Earth pyramids of South Tyrol =

Hoodoos in northern Italy

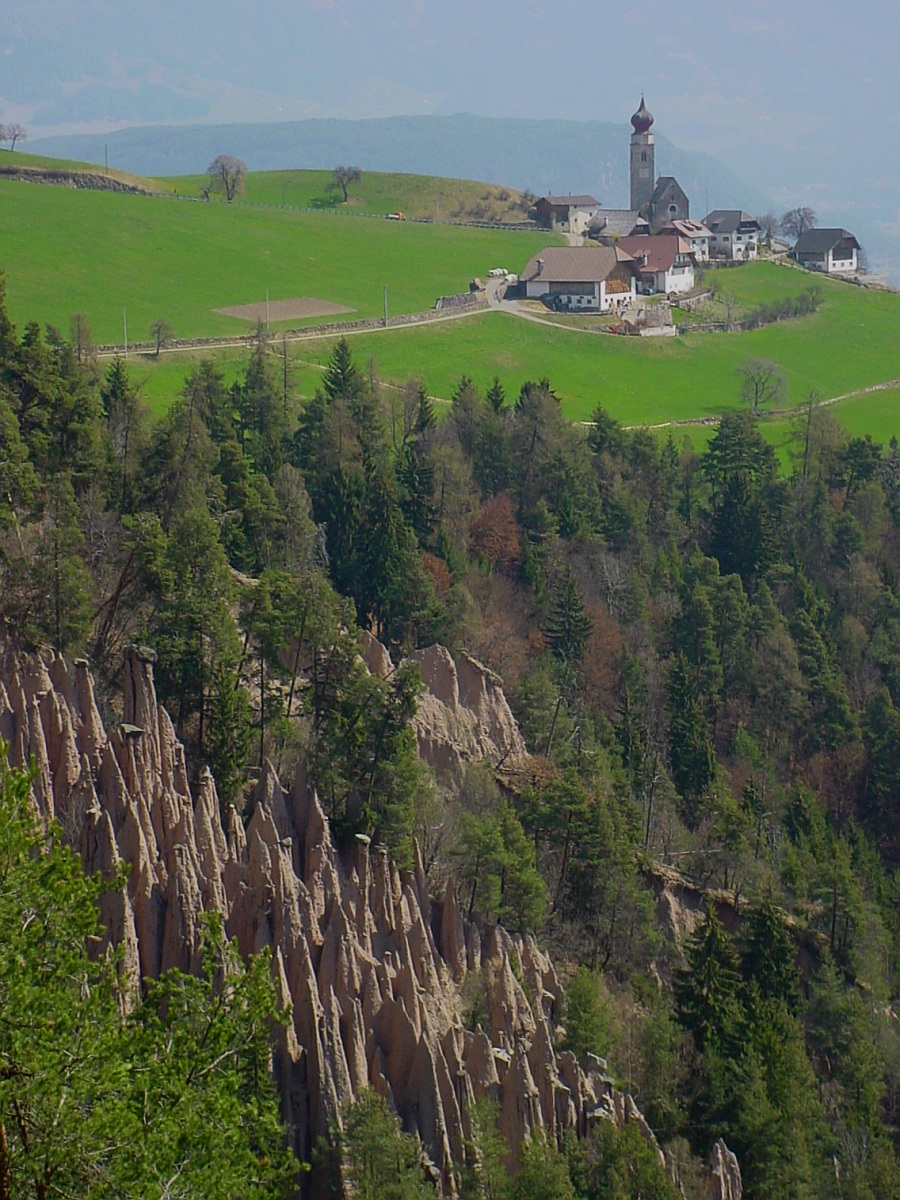
The pyramids of Ritten, the most famous in South Tyrol, towards Mittelberg

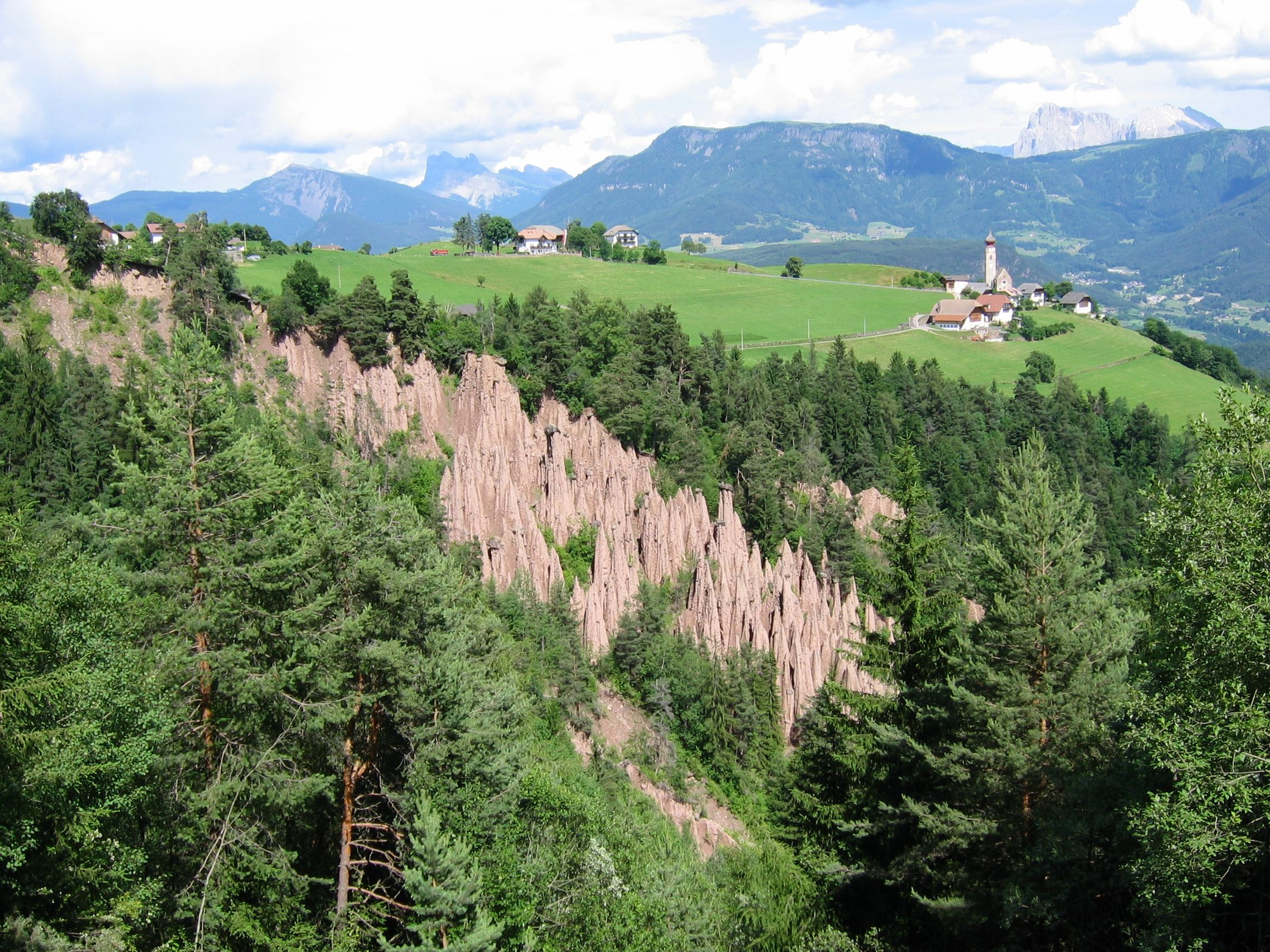
As seen from the west with Nicholas chapel and Dolomites

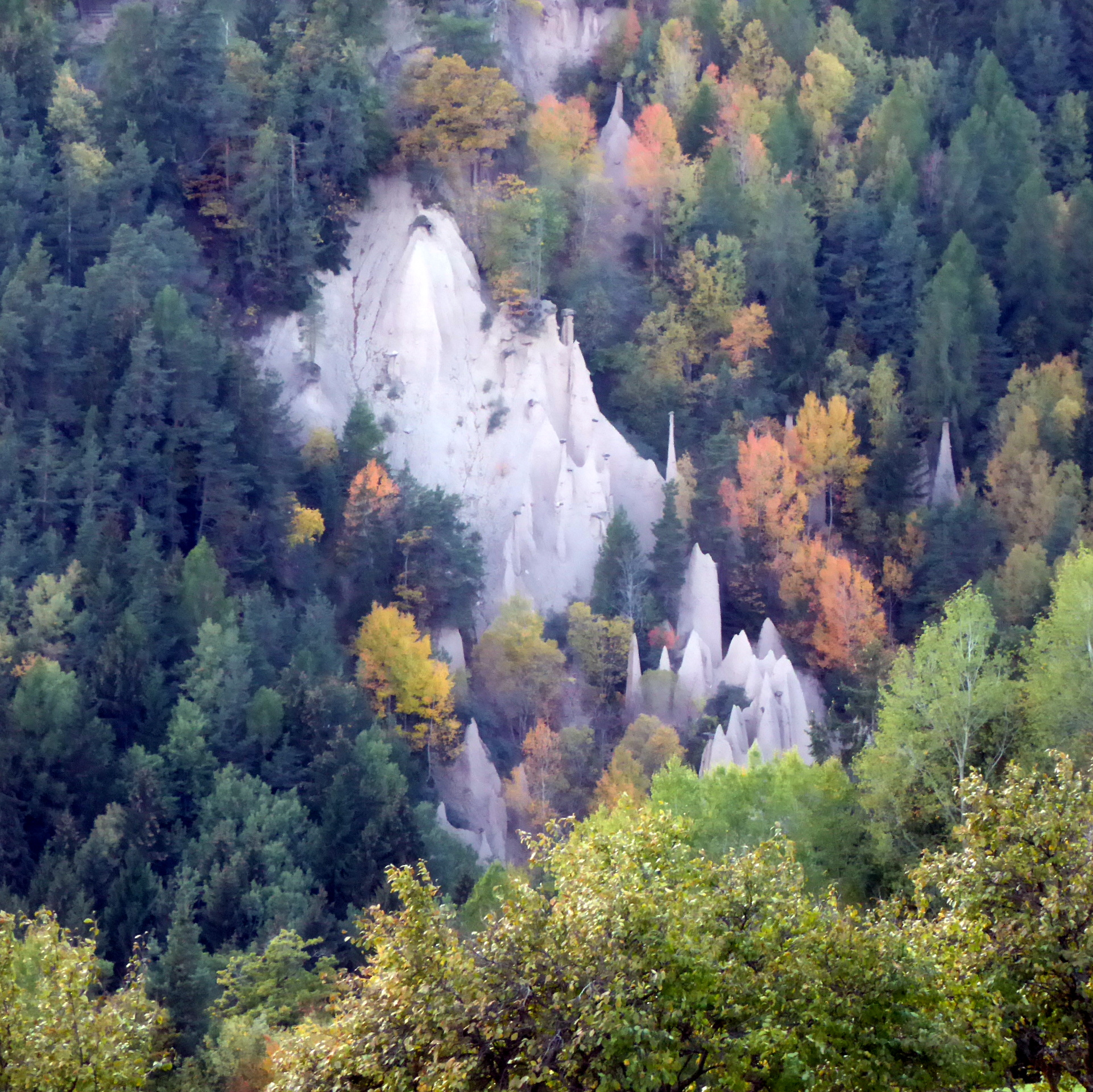
Pyramids in Autumn, as seen from Nicholas chapel

The earth pyramids in South Tyrol are a special natural phenomenon that comes about in particular terrain, usually after a landslide or an unhinging of the earth.

The main cause of the formation of earth pyramids is the continuous alternation of periods of torrential rain and drought. These phenomena, in particularly friable terrain, over the years, increasingly erode the ground and form such earth pyramids. Usually the pyramids are formed in terrain very well sheltered from wind so that they cannot be damaged by it.

Moreover, the life of the earth pyramids is strongly dependent on the climate which reigns during the time in which it is shaped by the rock that covers it.

There are several earth pyramids that can be safely visited. Among the most famous and admired the following are the most outstanding:

- the earth pyramids of Ritten, a plateau above Bolzano, which are divided into three distinct groups near the villages Klobenstein, Oberbozen, and Unterinn
- the earth pyramids of Platten near Percha in the Puster Valley

Other, less famous, earth pyramids are:

- in Terenten, Puster Valley
- in Mölten
- in Jenesien near Bolzano
- in the hinterland of Merano, in Tirol, Kuens, and Riffian
- in Karneid and Steinegg, one of its hamlets
- in Neustift in the Rigger valley
- in Segonzano in the Cembra valley in the adjoining province Trentino (not South Tyrol any more)
