= Abo abo =

Live album by Vopli Vidopliassova
- Released: 1992
- Recorded: June 1991, Belfort, France
- Genres: Punk rock Folk rock
- Length: 37:30
- Label: BSA Records

Vopli Vidopliassova chronology
Hey, O.K. (1991)	Abo abo (1992)	Kraina Mriy (1994)

Abo abo (Ukrainian: Або або, lit. 'Either ... or') is a live album by Ukrainian rock band Vopli Vidopliassova and the band's first official release. It was released in 1992 and is taken from a concert at the Eurockéennes festival in France in 1991. The concert was recorded by an unknown Frenchman with a Maxell cassette and was given to the band.

== Track list ==
No.	Title	Length
1.	"Демоны"	1:50
2.	"Машина"	2:17
3.	"Я підійду"	2:33
4.	"Мусса"	2:26
5.	"Ты ушёл"	3:21
6.	"Полонина"	2:59
7.	"Були деньки"	3:01
8.	"Рассвет"	3:24
9.	"Веселковий твист"	2:13
10.	"Оля"	2:58
11.	"Зв'язок"	2:06
12.	"Колись"	3:21
13.	"Або або"	2:33
14.	"Червоні кони"	2:29

The vinyl version of Abo abo has the first 7 tracks plus the first 18 seconds of Rassvet on side A and the rest of Rassvet plus tracks 8 through 14 on side B.

Track 1 has never been officially released anywhere else. Tracks 2–5, 9, 11 and 12 were released on Kraina Mriy. Track 6 was released on Fayno. Tracks 10 and 13 were released on Hvyli Amura and tracks 7 and 14 were released on Buly denky. Track 8 later was recorded by Borshch as "Konforka" and released on their self-titled single "/bɔːʃ/" in 2002.

In 1993, the album was reissued on vinyl.

A gig with a similar setlist, performed in Bordeaux in 1991, was released on the bootleg cassette Zhittya v Bordo in 1995.

On the Australian iTunes Store, the name of the album is censored due to the word abo coincidentally being an ethnic slur in Australian English referring to Australian Aborigines. The Ukrainian word is pronounced [ɐˈbɔ] and the Australian one is pronounced /ˈæboʊ/ AB-oh.

== Personnel ==
- Oleg Skripka - vocals, accordion, rhythm guitar
- Yuri Zdorenko - vocals, lead guitar
- Alexander Pipa - bass
- Sergei Sakhno - drums
