= Perca =

Perca may refer to:

- A genus of fish commonly referred to as Perch
- The Italian name for Percha, a town in South Tyrol, Italy
- Perca (Vogošća), a village in Vogošća, near Sarajevo, Bosnia and Herzegovina
