= Tantsi =

Studio album by Vopli Vidopliassova
- Released: 29 March 1989
- Recorded: February 1989; 1988
- Venue: Institute of Foreign Languages, Kyiv
- Studio: Institute of Metallurgy, Akademmistechko, Kyiv
- Genre: Punk rock Folk rock Ethno-punk
- Length: 44:30
- Label: Fonograf
- Producer: Vopli Vidopliassova; Andrew Rossiter (2023 reissue)

Vopli Vidopliassova chronology
Zv'yazok (1989)	Tantsi (1989)	Hey, O.K (1990)

Tantsi (Ukrainian: Танці, English: Dances) is an album by the band Vopli Vidopliassova. It was originally released on 29 March 1989 on Fonograf, the house record label of the newspaper Young Guard (Ukrainian: Молода Гвардія, romanized: Moloda Gvardia). Thirteen of the fourteen tracks were recorded in one night at the Institute of Metallurgy in the Akademmistechko neighborhood of Kyiv; "Mahatma" was recorded live at a show at the Institute of Foreign Languages.

== Re-release in the West ==
The album was featured in the book 100 magnitoalbomov sovetskogo roka. In 2023, a book about the Tantsi recording and the late Soviet Kyiv Underground, written by Maria Sonevytsky, was published in Bloomsbury's 33 1/3 Europe series. The book discusses the context of the Kyiv Underground; the ingenious circular economy devised to release the cassette album in the first place; the role of satire and humor in the band's songs; the relationship of the band to the Komsomol (Communist Youth League); and the enduring meaning of the song "Tantsi" in the aftermath of Russia's full-scale invasion of Ukraine in 2022.

A remastered version of the original Tantsi session was released on vinyl on Org Music for Record Store Day 2023. The vinyl release was named "new and notable" in Paste Magazine.

== Future releases of tracks from the album ==
Tracks 2 and 11 later became Borshch songs, being released on that band's self-titled EP in 2002. Track 1 was later released on Kraina Mriy. Tracks 3, 4 and 6 ended up on Hvyli Amura. Tracks 5, 10 and 14 were released on Muzika. Tracks 7, 9, 12 and 13 were released on Buly denky. Track 8 made its way to Fayno.

"Banka", an outtake from the sessions, was re-titled "Laznya" and released as a single in early 2019.

== Track list ==
No.	Title	Length
1.	"Танці" (Dancing)	2:36
2.	"Я летел" (I'm Flying)	2:22
3.	"Оля" (Olga)	2:25
4.	"Махатма" (Mahatma)	5:14
5.	"Краков'як" (Krakow)	2:45
6.	"Товарищ майор" (Comrade Major)	2:27
7.	"Політрок" (Politrock)	2:13
8.	"Полонина" (Mountains)	3:45
9.	"Були деньки" (Back in the Day)	3:00
10.	"Музика" (Music)	4:22
11.	"Рассвет" (Dawn)	3:16
12.	"Налягай" (Nalyagai; Moved to the end of side A on the 2023 LP release, after "Politrok")	2:12
13.	"Колискова" (Lullaby)	4:28
14.	"Гей! Любо!" (Hey, O.K!)	3:23
