= Earth pyramids of Platten =

Hoodoos in South Tyrol, Italy

Coordinates: 46°48′17″N 12°01′07″E

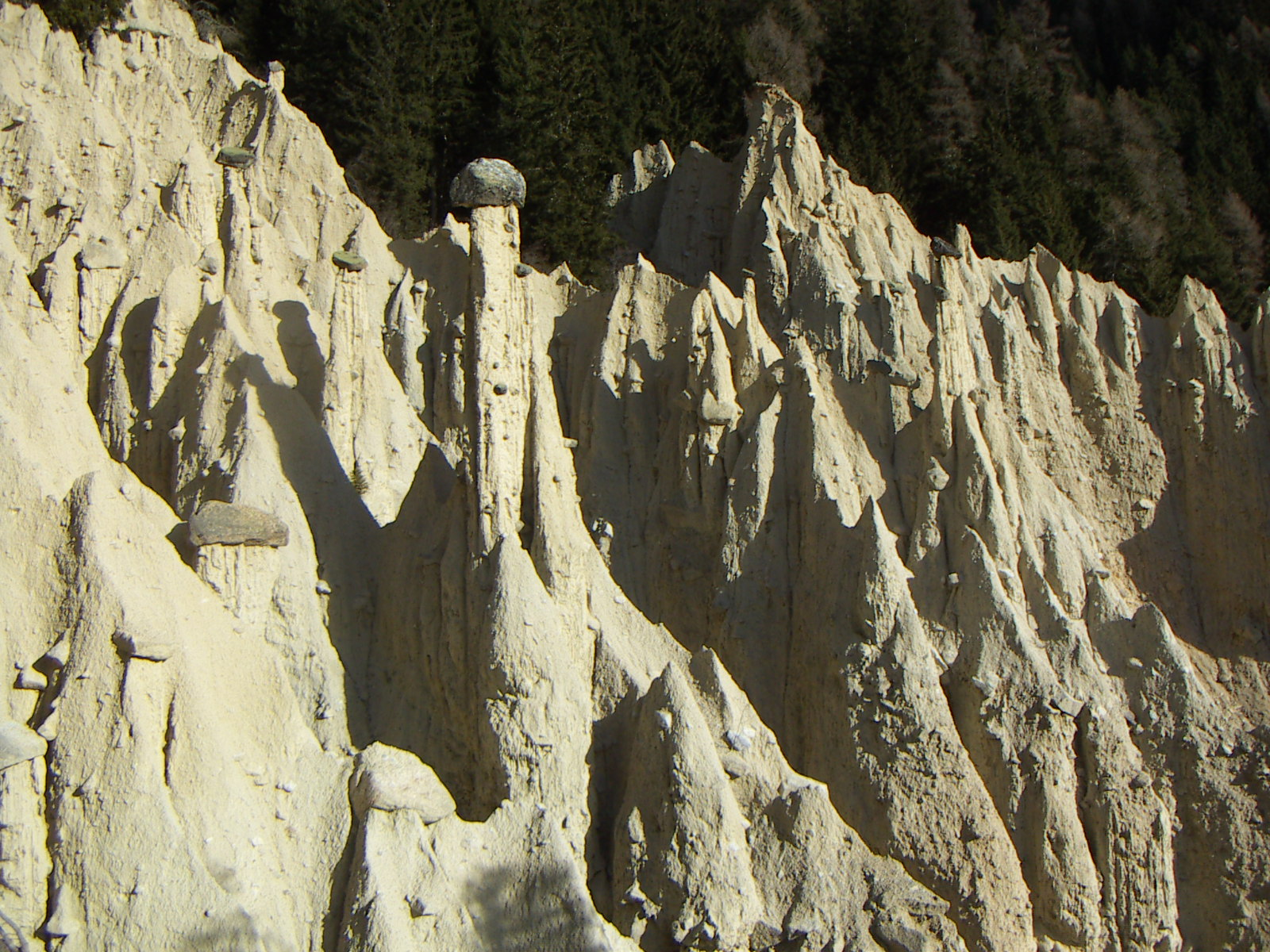
The earth pyramids of Platten

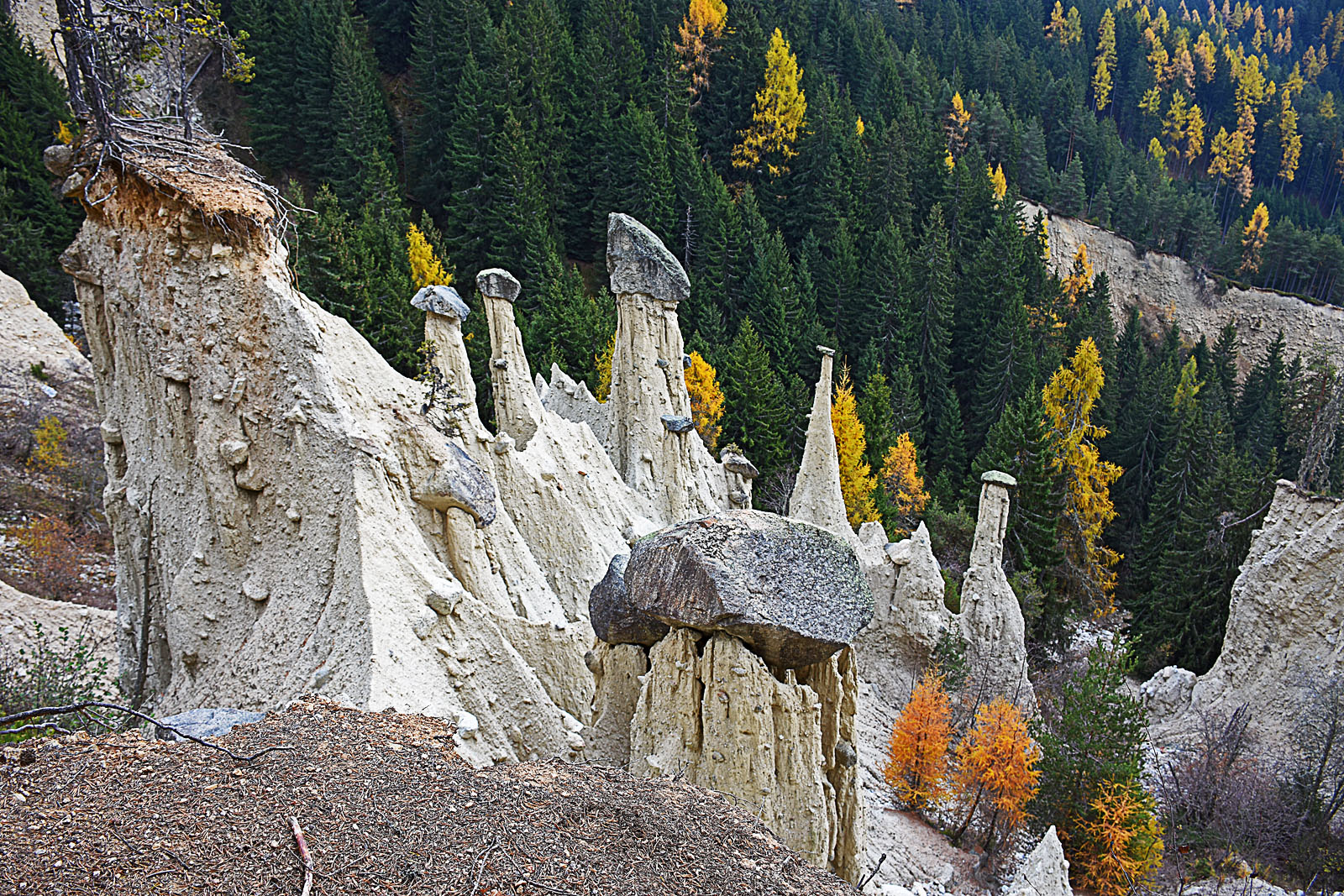
Platten earth pyramids in autumn

The earth pyramids of Platten (German: Erdpyramiden von Platten or Erdpyramiden bei Oberwielenbach; Italian: Piramidi di Plata [piˈraːmidi di ˈplaːta]) are earth pyramids located in Platten in the municipality of Percha, near Bruneck in South Tyrol, Italy.

The erosion area is located at an altitude of 1550 to 1750 meters.

The pyramids of Platten belong to the earth pyramids of South Tyrol.

They were described in a scientific manner for the first time by Karl Meusburger in 1914.

== History ==
Following a cloudburst, a few centuries ago, there came a landslide which cut off the roads connecting the villages in the surroundings of Aschbach.

In 1882, again after a heavy cloudburst, a new fault was formed. Following eluviations and erosions these earth pyramids are constantly changing; that is due to the succession of severe cold spells in winter and hot summers which have the effect of continually forming new ones.
