= Kraina Mriy (festival) =

Ukrainian music festival

- Location: Ukraine
- Years active: 2004–present
- Founder: Oleg Skrypka

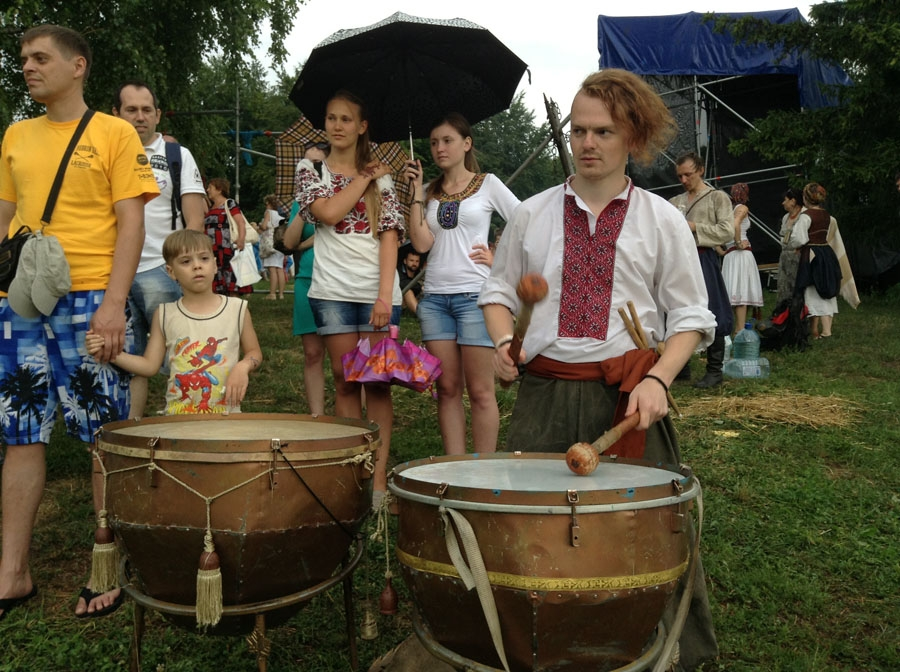
Kraina Mriy World Music Festival

Kraina Mriy (Ukrainian: Країна мрій, lit. 'Land of Dreams'), founded in 2004, is a biannual, multi-day festival of ethnically Ukrainian music. It was founded by Ukrainian musician Oleg Skrypka. The first festival was held at the Spivoche Pole (Singing Field) in Kyiv. The summer festival coincides with Midsummer, and the winter festival is celebrated on Orthodox Christmas (6 January). It was named after the song "Kraina Mriy".

The festival includes musical performances on the main stage, a craft fair, book fairs, folk crafts workshops, folk art exhibitions, authentic master classes and ethnic cuisine. Kraina Mriy aims to showcase the best of Ukrainian national and world music, crafts, parades, embroidery, cuisine, the Monholf'yeriya hot air balloon festival, and other original activities.

Since 2004, Krayina Mriy has had about 1 million attendees. In addition to the traditional location of Kyiv, it has also been held in Lviv, London, Surgut, and Perm. The festival season has two formats; summer and winter. In winter 2017, it was held in two cities: Kyiv, at Spivoche Pole, on January 7; and in Dnipro, 7–8 January, at Heroes' Square Maidan.
