= Vopli Vidopliassova =

Ukrainian rock band

Vopli Vidopliassova Воплі Відоплясова
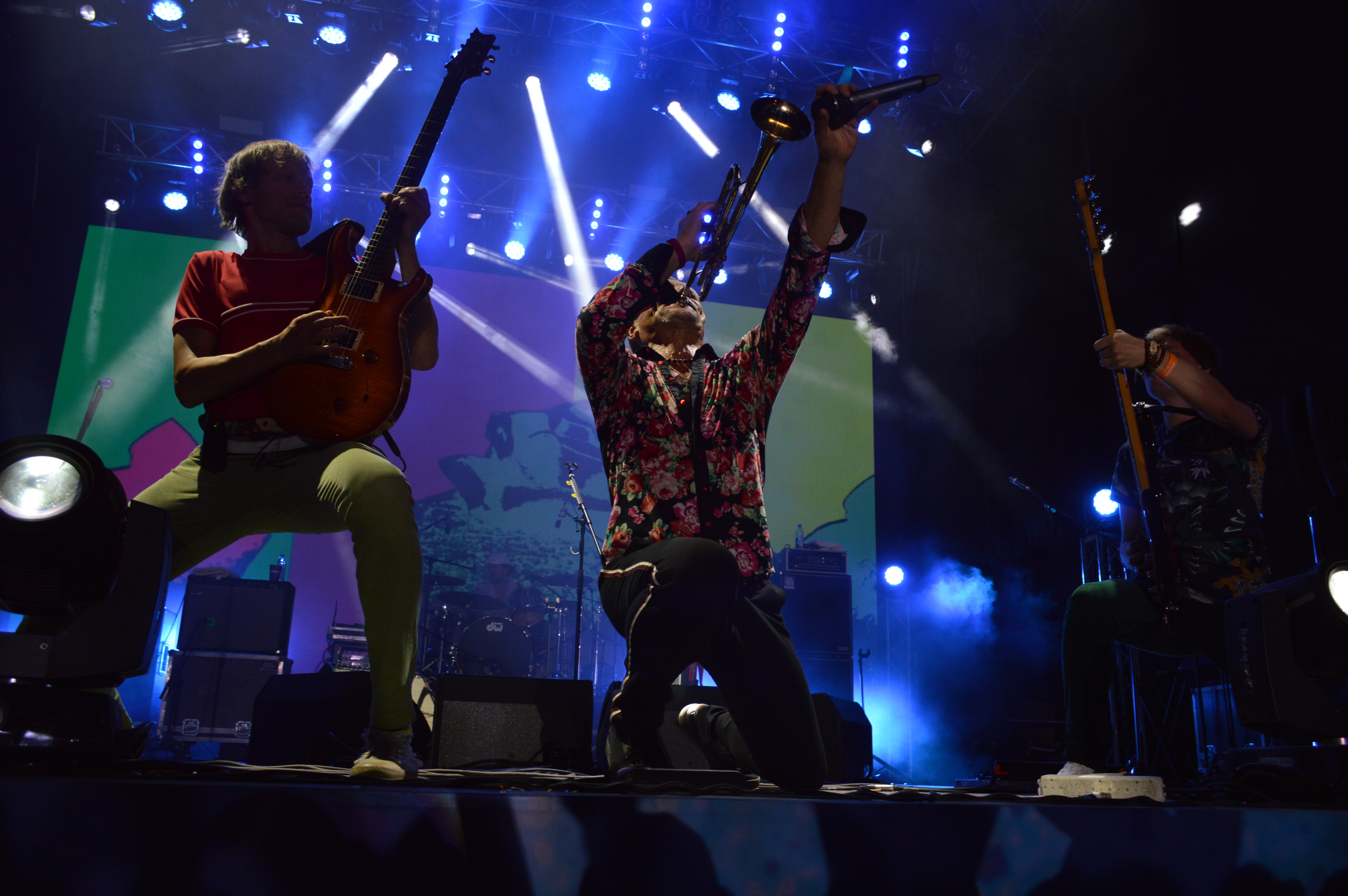

Background information
- Origin: Kiev, Ukrainian SSR, Soviet Union (now Kyiv, Ukraine)
- Genres: Rock, punk rock, folk-rock, psychedelic
- Years active: 1986–present
- Members: Oleh Skrypka; Oleksiy Melchenko; Eugeniy Rogachevskyi; Serhiy Sakhno
- Past members: Oleksandr Pipa; Yuri Zdorenko; Philippe Moja; Stéphane Moufflier; Gerard Christophe

Vopli Vidopliassova (Ukrainian: Воплі Відоплясова [ˈwɔpl⁽ʲ⁾i widoˈplʲɑsowɐ], lit. 'Screams of Vidoplyasov'), also shortened to VV (ВВ), is a Ukrainian rock band, founded in 1986 in Kyiv. The leader of the band is singer Oleh Skrypka. Vopli Vidopliasova are the founders of Ukrainian rock-n-roll style and neo-ethnic rock. They first sang Ukrainian rock outside Ukraine. Their influences include folk, patriotic songs, punk, hard rock, heavy metal and, most recently, electronic music.

Their song Den Narodzhennia is featured in the Russian crime films Brother and Brother 2 by director Aleksei Balabanov. Band member Oleh Skrypka has also produced several solo albums.

In 2009, their record label, Kraina Mriy, released all their albums for free as a Christmas present.

Much of their early material (1986-1996) is in Drop C tuning.

== History ==
=== Formation and early years: 1986-1992 ===
The band was formed in 1986 by guitarist Yuri Zdorenko and bassist Oleksandr Pipa, who had played in the band SOS since 1984. It took its name from Vidopliassov, a character from The Village of Stepanchikovo. The band had their first performance at the Kyiv rock club on 30 October 1987, with vocalist and accordionist Oleh Skrypka and drummer Serhiy Sakhno.

The name of the new group was suggested by Pipa, who was then reading Dostoevsky: the character Grigory Vidoplyasov, in the novel “The Village of Stepanchikovo" writes compositions, filled with 'howls of the soul,' that he calls “Vopli Vidoplyasova” (the screams of Vidoplyasov, Russian: вопли Видоплясова, [ˈvoplʲi vʲidəˈplʲæsəvə]). The group have used this transliterated Russian name since, however they adopted the Ukrainian version Volannia Vidopliassova (Ukrainian: Волання Відоплясова, [woˈlɑɲːɐ widoˈplʲɑsowɐ]) for the Chervona Ruta festival in 1989.

In 1989, the band recorded a session at the Faberge Hall of Culture in Kyiv, and released it as Tantsi. That same year, they appeared on the French compilation De Lenine a Lennon, the soundtrack to a French documentary on Soviet rock, and supported Sonic Youth at the Kyiv show of their Soviet tour.

In 1990, they released the album Hey, O.K on Kobza International and appeared on the Canadian compilation This Ain't No Polka (a recording of the 1989 Chervona Ruta) with the song "Tantsi". The following year, they played at the Eurockeennes festival in France, and the recording was released as Abo abo on BSA Records a year later. In 1991, Skripka and Pipa moved to France and would divide their time between it and Ukraine.

=== French period, return to Ukraine and success: 1992-1999 ===
In 1992, Skripka, Zdorenko, Pipa and Sakhno entered Komora Studio in Kyiv to begin recording what would become their debut album, Kraina Mriy, released two years later. Zdorenko quit the group in 1993, starting his own, YaYaYa, as a side project. He was replaced by Philippe Moja. Stéphane Moufflier would also join VV to replace Sakhno, who had taken a hiatus.

In 1996, Skrypka and Pipa, who had just returned from France (having lived there since 1990), moved back to Ukraine with Moufflier and new guitarist Gerard Christophe and began recording the album Muzika, released in 1997. A single was released in 1996 with 4 tracks from the album. Skrypka sang, programmed the drums and played accordion, traditional Ukrainian folk instruments and some guitar, while Pipa played bass. Zdorenko played guitar on the track "Gei, liubo!". On the album, "Hei! Liubo!" is crossfaded with "Bogi", but on the single, it wasn't crossfaded and its natural ending rang out, however on recent compilations, it just cuts off at the part of the end where "Bogi" is expected to begin.

In 1997, Moufflier and Christophe left the band and returned to France. Sakhno rejoined the band and Evhen Rohachevsky joined as guitarist. With this new lineup, they began recording their third album, Khvyli Amura, released in 2000. Around that time, Skrypka became interested in Indian music, and the album reflects that, particularly in the song "Den narodjennya".

=== New millennium and later years: 2000-2022 ===
In 2000, the band contributed tracks to tribute albums to Grazhdanskaya Oborona ("Pops") and Kino ("Pachka sigaret" and "Solnechnye dni"), and appeared on the Sprite Driver 2 compilation in 2001 with the song "Osen". The latter three songs were translated into Ukrainian and appeared as B-sides to the single "Mamay" that year. In 2002, the album Fayno was finally released, featuring "Solnechnye dni" (by then renamed "Sonyachni dni"), "Osen" (by then renamed "Zoryana osin"), a remixed version of "Mamay", a partially re-recorded version of "Pachka sigaret" (by then renamed "Pachka tsyharok") and a censored version of "Pops". The original presses on Lavina Music and Misteria Zvuka contained three bonus tracks: the original Russian version of "Osen", "The Pack of Cigarettes" (an English version of "Pachka sigaret") and "Les jours de soleil" (a French version of "Solnechnie dni"), demonstrating Oleh Skrypka's multilingualism.

In 2006, Oleksandr Pipa left the band and was replaced by Oleksiy Melchenko. They then recorded the album Buly denky, a compilation of old songs from the late 80s and early 90s which had never got the studio treatment before, but which had been played live. That year, they played the first "Rok-Sich" festival, a festival started by Skrypka with the intent to foster local talent. The rules for the Rock Sich are that any genre other than pop is acceptable and that all bands must sing in Ukrainian, however VV broke their own rule and played "Pops" at the concert in the original Russian and with the original uncensored lyrics. The performance was released on CD in 2008, DVD in 2011 and double LP in 2012. The standard one-CD version of the Rock Sich album had two tracks cut due to space constraints, but a two-CD version was available with the missing tracks restored. The missing tracks were also on the vinyl and DVD.

In August 2009 they played as headliners at the “Be Free” festival organized by the European Radio for Belarus in Chernihiv (Ukraine) together with Lyapis Trubetskoy, Hair Peace Salon, and more Belarusian rock bands.

In 2009 and 2010, the band released the singles "Lado", "Chio San" and "Vidpustka". Their sixth and most recent album "Chudovy svit" was released on 18 October 2013, including the previous singles. The band have continued to release singles since.

Between 2013 and 2016, the group carried out a vinyl rerelease campaign. In 2017, Melchenko left the group and was replaced by Mykola Usatyi.

=== Russian invasion of Ukraine and Western releases: 2022-present ===
On 25 November 2022, the group re-released their 2006 song "Buly denky" as a single, to celebrate the recapture of Kherson by Ukrainian forces. 22 April 2023 saw the first official re-release of the band's 1989 album Tantsi for Record Store Day, coinciding with a book in the 33 1/3 series about the album. This is also the band's first official release in the West, barring releases sold at the band's French concerts between 1992-6 and their collaboration with Les VRP in 1992.

In 2025, the band announced a tour to celebrate the upcoming 40th anniversary of their foundation, which will also include their first concerts in Australia.

Due to Sakhno and Rogachevsky not being permitted to leave Ukraine, they have been substituted for by Belgian musician Benjamin Baert (who has also performed with Tequilajazzz) and Ukrainian musician Oleksandr Lozovskyi respectively.

== Members ==
=== Current members ===
- Oleh Skrypka - lead vocals, accordion, guitars, saxophone, trumpet, programming, keyboards (1986-present)
- Yevhen Rohachevsky - guitar, backing vocals (1997-present)
- Mykola Usaty - bass (2017-present)
- Serhiy Sakhno - drums, percussion, backing vocals (1986-1993, 1997-present)

=== Touring members ===
- Oleksandr Lozovskyi - guitar, vocals, backing vocals (2023-present)
- Benjamin Baert - drums (2023-present)

=== Former members ===
- Yuri Zdorenko - guitar, co-lead vocals (1986-1993)
- Oleksandr Pipa - bass (1986-2007)
- Stéphane Moufflier - drums (1993-1996)
- Philippe Moja - guitar (1993-1997)
- Oleksiy Melchenko - bass (2007-2017)

== Discography ==
- 1989 - Tantsi (Танці)
- 1992 - Abo abo (Або або)
- 1993 - Zakustyka (Закустика)
- 1994 - Kraina Mriy (Країна Мрій)
- 1997 - Muzika (Музіка)
- 2000 - Khvyli Amura (Хвилі Амура)
- 2002 - Fayno (Файно)
- 2006 - Buly Denky (Були деньки)
- 2008 - VV na sceni festivalju "ROK-SICH" (ВВ на сцені фестивалю Рок-Січ)
- 2013 - Chudovy svit (Чудовий світ)

=== Video clips ===
In video clips traces the love of Ukrainian car industry. So in the video for the song Musika can be seen ZAZ-1105 Dana, and in the video for the song Polonyna except car LuAZ Volyn-1302 also tractor HTZ T-150 and T-64B. In a recent video clip Vacation attended two convertibles based on ZAZ-965 and ZAZ-968

| Year | Name of Song | Producer (s) | Album |
|---|---|---|---|
| 1989 | «Dance» («Танці») | | Dance (Танці) |
| 1996 | «Musika» («Музіка») | | Musika (Музіка) |
| 1996 | «Spring» («Весна») | Aleksander Solokha | Musika (Музіка) |
| 1997 | «Burned Pine» («Горіла сосна») | Yevhen Mytrofanov | Musika (Музіка) |
| 1998 | «Love» («Любов») | | Waves of Amur (Хвилі Амура) |
| 1999 | «Birthday» («День народження») | Olga Stolpovska & Dmytro Troitskyi | Waves of Amur (Хвилі Амура) |
| 1999 | «They Were in the Countryside» («Були на селі») | | Waves of Amur (Хвилі Амура) |
| 2000 | «Secret spheres» («Таємні сфери») | | Waves of Amur (Хвилі Амура) |
| 2001 | «Birthday (remix)» («День народження (remix)») | | Birthday (День народження) |
| 2002 | «World» («Світ») | Mykhaylo Shelepov ta Oleh Lebid | Fayno (Файно) |
| 2003 | «Polonyna» («Полонина») | Mykhailo Shelepov | Fayno (Файно) |
| 2003 | «Sunny Days» («Сонячні дні») | Andriy Lebedev | Fayno (Файно) |
| 2003 | «Star Autumn» («Зоряна осінь») | Ulyana Shyshkina | Fayno (Файно) |
| 2006 | «Song» («Пісенька») | | Buly denky (Були деньки) |
| 2006 | «Lull» («Колискова») | Oleg Tsurikov | Buly denky (Були деньки) |
| 2006 | «Katherine» («Катерина») | Roman Bondarchuk & Oleh Skrypka | Buly denky (Були деньки) |
| 2009 | «Lado» («Ладо») | Oleh Skrypka & Viktor Skuratovskiy | Chudovy svit (Чудовий світ) |
| 2009 | «Cio Cio San» («Чіо Чіо Сан») | Oleh Skrypka | Chudovy svit (Чудовий світ) |
| 2010 | «Vacation» («Відпустка») | Oleh Skrypka | Chudovy svit (Чудовий світ) |
| 2012 | «Shchedryk» («Щедрик») | Oleh Skrypka | Chudovy svit (Чудовий світ) |
| 2013 | «Chudovy svit» («Чудовий світ») | Oleh Skrypka | Chudovy svit (Чудовий світ) |
| 2015 | «Talalai» («Талалай») | Volodymyr Yakymenko | Chudovy svit (Чудовий світ) |
| 2017 | «Nese Galya vodu» («Несе Галя воду») | | |
| 2019 | «Laznya» («Лазня») | | |
| 2019 | «A-ya-ya-yai» «А-я-я-яй» | | |
