= Kraina Mriy =

Studio album by Vopli Vidopliassova
- Released: 1994; 1997 (remix)
- Recorded: 1992–1994, Komora Studios, Kyiv
- Genre: Punk rock Folk rock
- Length: 44:42; 44:09 (remix)
- Label: BSA Records; SBA/Gala (remix); Kraina Mriy (remix)

Vopli Vidopliassova chronology
Abo abo (1992)	Kraina Mriy (1994)	Zakustyka (1995)

Alternative cover
- The cover for the remix of Kraina Mriy as originally released by SBA/Gala in 1997

Alternative cover
- The cover for the remix of Kraina Mriy as released by the record label of the same name in 2006 and later in 2011. This image was originally found inside the digipak of the 1997 edition.

Kraina Mriy (Ukrainian: Країна Мрій [krɐˈjinɐ ˈmr⁽ʲ⁾ij]; English: The Land of Dreams) is the debut studio album by Vopli Vidopliassova. It was originally released in 1994 on BSA Records. When Vopli Vidopliassova's "French period" (1990–1996) ended, the band returned to Ukraine and had the album remixed and re-released in 1997.

== Single ==
The song "Країна мрій" was written in 1990 by vocalist/accordionist Oleg Skripka. It was initially released on the band's album Hey, O.K that year by Kobza International, but did not gain popularity until its release on Kraina Mriy. Since then, it has become an anthem of sorts for VV fans, often closing their concerts.

The song inspired the music festival of the same name in 2004. Since 1998, it is occasionally used to end the band's concerts.

In 2011 the band re-sung the song "Країна мрій" (The Land of Dreams) in the Belarusian language as "Краіна мрой" for the Budzma! Tuzin. Perazagruzka-2 compilation album. In 2018 the music portal Tuzin.fm together with Letapis.by selected this self-cover by Vopli Vidopliassova in the top of “60 today’s hits in the Belarusian language,” a list of best songs released since 1988.

== Track lists ==
No.	Title	Length
1.	"Кармен" (Carmen)	3:36
2.	"Машина" (Car)	2:14
3.	"Я підійду" (I'll Come)	2:15
4.	"Мусса" (Mussa)	2:15
5.	"Ты ушёл" (You've Gone)	2:46
6.	"Знову зима" (Winter Again)	1:32
7.	"Галелуя" (Hallelujah)	2:16
8.	"Alright"	2:30
9.	"Галю, приходь!" (Galya, Come)	2:16
10.	"Танці" (Dances)	2:34
11.	"Легенда о любви" (Legends of Love)	1:43
12.	"Ліда" (Lida)	1:16
13.	"Шалена зірка" (Mad Star)	2:57
14.	"Танго" (Tango)	2:29
15.	"Веселковий твист" (Rainbow Twist)	1:50
16.	"Зв'язок" (Connection)	2:11
17.	"Колись" (Once)	2:51
18.	"Країна мрій" (The Land of Dreams)	5:08

=== 1997 remix ===
No.	Title	Length
1.	"Dansez"	2:21
2.	"Шалена зірка"	3:08
3.	"Машина"	2:16
4.	"Я підійду"	2:17
5.	"Кармен"	3:25
6.	"Зв'язок"	2:13
7.	"Легенда о любви"	1:45
8.	"Ліда"	1:17
9.	"Веселковий твист"	1:51
10.	"Галелуя"	2:14
11.	"Ты ушёл / T'es parti"	3:39
12.	"Alright"	2:33
13.	"Галю, приходь!"	2:19
14.	"Танго"	2:30
15.	"Колись"	2:51
16.	"Танці"	2:24
17.	"Країна мрій"	5:07
18.	"Знову зима" (Bonus track, only on 2006 edition)	1:32

When this was released on vinyl in 2013, "Znovu zima" was included at the end of side A.

The track "Legenda o lyubvi" is performed in a vocalise style in both versions of the album, but the lyrics are printed in the booklet. The lyrics were sung live in 1990 at a concert in Sverdlovsk.

The "Zbirka" series of compilations released by VV in 2007 have a near-complete version (excluding "Legenda o lyubvi") of Kraina Mriy split across the four CDs.

== Personnel ==
- Oleg Skripka - vocals, guitar, accordion
- Yuri Zdorenko - vocals, guitar
- Alexander Pipa - vocals, bass
- Sergei Sakhno - vocals, drums
