= Hey, O.K =

1990 studio album by Vopli Vidopliassova

Studio album by Vopli Vidopliassova
- Released: 1990
- Recorded: Kobza Studio, Kiev, 1989–1990
- Genre: Punk rock Folk rock
- Length: 54:37
- Label: Kobza
- Producer: Volodymyr Leshchenko

Vopli Vidopliassova chronology
Tantsi (1989)	Hey, O.K (1990)	Abo abo (1992)

Hey, O.K (Ukrainian: Гей, любо) is an album by the band Vopli Vidopliassova. It was released by the Ukrainian-Canadian label Kobza in 1990.

The album is not acknowledged on the band's official website.

== Track list ==
All tracks are written by Oleg Skripka unless otherwise specified.

Side A
No.	Title	Writer(s)	Length
1.	"Зв'язок" (Connection)	Skripka, Yuri Zdorenko	2:09
2.	"Полонина" (Polonyna (In the mountains))	Skripka, Zdorenko	3:15
3.	"Пісенька" (Sweet little song)	Skripka, Zdorenko	3:50
4.	"Гей! Любо!" (Hey, O.K!)	Skripka, Zdorenko	2:42
5.	"Галина" (Halyna)		2:43
6.	"Були деньки" (Back in the good old days)		3:02
7.	"Білі плями" (White spots)		2:54
8.	"Галелуя" (Hallelujah)		2:30
9.	"Шалена зірка" (Mad star)		3:00
10.	"Світанок" (Sunrise)	Zdorenko, Oleg Ovchar	3:09

Side B
No.	Title	Writer(s)	Length
11.	"Танці" (Dancing)		2:28
12.	"Пісня" (A song)	Skripka, Zdorenko	2:48
13.	"Веселковий твист" (Rainbow twist)	Skripka, Zdorenko	1:56
14.	"Музика" (Music)	Skripka, Ovchar	3:27
15.	"Я летів" (Flying down)	Zdorenko, Ovchar	2:23
16.	"Трава" (Grass)	Skripka, Zdorenko	2:40
17.	"А-Ба-Бап" (ABUPUP)	Skripka, Zdorenko	1:37
18.	"Колись" (Once)	Skripka, Zdorenko	5:08
19.	"Країна мрій" (The Land of Dreams)		5:20

Both tracks written by Yuri Zdorenko and Oleg Ovchar (tracks 10 and 15) are not in Russian. Normally, the tracks are sung in Russian, but here they are presented with Ukrainian titles. Track 10 is in vocalise and track 15 is in English. Track 16 is arranged differently from the version that would later appear on Hvyli Amura a decade later. Track 19 has a drum and guitar intro instead of the speech and the outro features Zdorenko sliding his hand over the neck.

The songs were written between 1987 and 1990.

== Leaked rehearsal tape ==
Hey, O.K (rehearsal tape)

Demo album by Vopli Vidopliassova
- Released: unknown (leaked)
- Recorded: Kobza Studio, Kiev, 1989
- Genre: Punk rock Folk rock
- Length: 17:51

An 8-song demo tape recorded in the Kobza Studio in 1989 circulates. The tape contains 6 of the songs plus two unreleased songs, "Ty ushel" and "Chio San". "Chio San" would later be re-recorded and released on the album Chudovy svit in 2013, more than 20 years after the original conception of the song. "Ty ushel" was intended to be put on the tape, but was left off and later appeared in 1992 on Abo abo. "Bili plyamy" is also arranged differently on this tape, suggesting the tape was recorded before the present arrangement of the song. The track list goes as follows:

No.	Title	Length
1.	"Зв'язок"	2:13
2.	"А-Ба-Бап"	1:41
3.	"Білі плями"	1:46
4.	"Чио Сан"	2:16
5.	"Шалена зірка"	3:10
6.	"Веселковий твист"	1:59
7.	"Ты ушёл"	2:34
8.	"Трава"	2:13

Videos of "Zv'yazok" and "Ty ushel" from these sessions were included on the documentary "Hai zhyve VV" in 1995.

== Personnel ==
- Oleg Skripka – vocals, accordion, guitar, saxophone
- Yuri Zdorenko – guitar, vocals, whistling
- Aleksandr Pipa – bass, vocals
- Sergei Sakhno – drums, vocals, whistling
- Engineered by Vladimir Leschenko

== Cover-versions ==
In 2011 the band re-sung the song “Країна мрій” (The Land of Dreams) in the Belarusian language as “Краіна мрой” for the Budzma! Tuzin. Perazagruzka-2 compilation album. In 2018 the music portal Tuzin.fm together with Letapis.by selected this self-cover by Vopli Vidopliassova in the top of “60 today’s hits in the Belarusian language,” a list of best songs released since 1988.
