= Chudovy svit =

Studio album by Vopli Vidopliassova
- Released: 18 October 2013
- Recorded: 2008–2013
- Genre: Folk rock Indian music Soft rock Hard rock
- Length: 51:39
- Label: Kraina Mriy

Vopli Vidopliassova chronology
Buly denky (2006)	Chudovy svit (2013)

Chudovy svit (Ukrainian: Чудовий світ, Wonderful World) is the sixth studio album by Vopli Vidopliassova, and the first in seven years since Buly denky. The album was released on 18 October 2013.

Before the album's release, the songs "Lado", "Chio Chio San" and "Vidpustka" were released as singles. Vidpustka and Chio Chio San predate the album: Vidpustka shares its melody with a song called "Konspekt" released in 1987 on Vopli Vidopliassova's first album Hai zhyve VV! and Chio Chio San was recorded in 1989 during the Hey, O.K sessions but was not included on the final album, however an 8-track rehearsal tape circulates.

This is also the band's final official release in Russia, since due to the beginning of the Russia-Ukraine conflict the following year, the band have since refused to play in Russia.

== Track list ==
No.	Title	Length
1.	"Мана"	4:01
2.	"Чудовий світ"	4:38
3.	"Талалай"	4:15
4.	"Щедрик"	3:42
5.	"Ладо"	6:06
6.	"Диво"	4:11
7.	"Відпустка"	3:31
8.	"Понеділок"	3:39
9.	"Примари"	3:37
10.	"Чио Чио Сан"	4:20
11.	"Січові Стрільці"	3:37
12.	"Дібрівонька"	6:01
