= Oleh Skrypka =

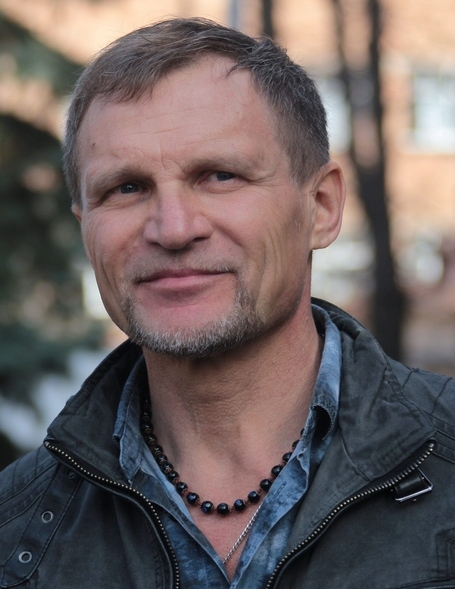
- Skrypka in 2017

Background information
- Born: 24 May 1964 (age 62); Sovetobod, Tajik SSR (now Ghafurov, Tajikistan)
- Origin: Ukraine
- Genres: Folk rock, punk rock, Indian music, schlager
- Instruments: Vocals, accordion, electric guitar, saxophone, trumpet, guitar.
- Years active: 1986–present
- Labels: Fonograf; Kobza International; BSA Records; SBA/Gala Records; Lavina Music; Kraina Mriy
- Member of: Vopli Vidopliassova

Oleh Yuriyovych Skrypka (Ukrainian: Оле́г Ю́рійович Скри́пка, romanized: Oleh Yuriiovych Skrypka, pronounced [oˈlɛɦ ˈjur⁽ʲ⁾ijowɪtʃ ˈskrɪpkɐ]; born 24 May 1964) is a Ukrainian musician, vocalist, composer, and leader of the group Vopli Vidoplyasova.

== Early life and education ==
Skrypka was born in Sovetabad (now Ghafurov, Tajikistan). His father Yurii Pavlovych (died 30 August 2015), a radiologist, came from Hiltsi, a village in the Poltava region of Ukraine. His mother Hanna Oleksiyivna, a teacher, came from a small village in the Kursk region of Russia. In 1972, the Skrypka family moved to the Murmansk region of Russia, due to Hanna not liking the Tajik climate.

In 1987, he graduated from Kyiv Polytechnic Institute, founding the rock group Vopli Vidopliassova (VV) that same year with Yurii Zdorenko and Oleksandr Pipa of the heavy metal band SOS and mutual friend Serhii Sakhno. In 1987, VV became a member of the Kyiv rock club, won the first prize at the Kyiv rock festival "Rock-parade", released their hit "Танцi" ("dancing", or "dances").

== Career ==
In 1990, the group took a tour of France and Switzerland, during which time one of France's largest newspapers, Le Monde, published material about VV. From 1991 to 1996, Oleh Skrypka, together with his group, lived in France, and toured the country. In 1993, Zdorenko and Sakhno left and Skrypka replaced them with French musicians. Sakhno would return in 1997.

In 1996, he returned to Kyiv and since then has been playing many concerts in Ukraine and abroad. Before 2014, he regularly visited Moscow. In 2000, VV performed in Riga, London, gave a concert in the Moscow Palace of Youth, after that – a tour around the cities of Siberia.

In January 2002 the group toured Israel and Portugal, and in February of the same year gave several concerts in New York. In 2003, they performed in Toronto.

In 2004, Skrypka was one of the organizers of the festival Krayina Mriy, the festival began its history 14 years after the song and ten years after the album "VV" with the same name. Under the auspices of "Krayina Mriy" Oleh Skrypka also involved in publishing and versatile educational activities. Skrypka is the founder of another festival of modern Ukrainian rock music – "Rock Sich". The main purpose of the festival – to support the national rock culture. This capital and the only festival where both the three stages heard Ukrainian rock music. (In 2010, "Rock Sich" has acquired the status of an environmental festival. And from 2013 the festival gained international status, becoming a Swedish-Ukrainian).

In 2007, Skrypka won the second place in the project Dances With the Stars 2. In 2009, a group of activists attempted to nominate Skrypka as a candidate for President of Ukraine, but he refused the nomination.

In 2014, Skrypka stated in an interview with Rossiiskaya gazeta that he and Vopli Vidopliassova would no longer perform in Russia. Later that year, he pulled out of a concert in London that also featured popular Russian singer Valeriya, stating that he would not perform in Russia or alongside Russians "as long as Russia and Ukraine are at war".

In 2016, Skrypka and numerous other Ukrainian entertainers lobbied President Petro Poroshenko to ban broadcasting of Russian film and music in the country, as well as banning the import of Russian film and music.

=== Controversy ===
In April 2017, Skrypka was recorded stating that people who don't speak Ukrainian have "low IQs" and should be sent to "ghettoes". He denied making those remarks, but the recording surfaced. On the 22nd of that month, Skrypka was called by Russian prankster Vladimir Kuznetsov, of Vovan and Lexus fame, who introduced himself as Arsen Avakov, the Ukrainian Minister of Internal Affairs. During the conversation with "Avakov", Skrypka was questioned about his comments, and also accused the newspaper Ukrayinska Pravda of taking his words out of context. He did not issue a formal apology until later that night, when he realised he had been the victim of a prank. In his apology, he also stated that the prank call was not a "provocation" against him, but against all Ukraine.

In September 2023 he told in an interview that he is sure that feminism and the LGBT movement lead to the reduction of humanity and are tools of population reduction along with wars and epidemics.

In October 2025, in an interview with Apostrophe TV he supported the idea of a “military coup” to allow only military personnel in government. At the same time, he added that military personnel and volunteers should also be vetted to see what they were like “beyond the media image.”

== Personal life ==
Skrypka speaks fluently Ukrainian, Russian, English and French. His first language was Russian – his first exposure to Ukrainian came in 1974, when he went on a family holiday to Hiltsi. He did not become fluent in Ukrainian until 1994.

In September 2023, 20 months after Russia's full scale invasion of Ukraine, Skrypka expressed his "private opinion" that Ukrainian artists like Vera Brezhneva and Svetlana Loboda had committed a "cultural crime" by continuing their careers in Russia after the start of the Russo-Ukrainian War in 2014. He suggested that they were also to blame for the Russian invasion (of February 2022).

== Discography ==
- 2001 — Inkoly (Інколи)
- 2004 — Vidrada (Відрада)
- 2009 — Serce u mene vrazilve (Серце у Мене Вразливе)
- 2010 — Shchedryk (Щедрик)
- 2011 — Jorjina (Жоржина)
- 2011 — Humanisty (feat. Les Poderv'yansky) (Гуманісти)
- 2016 — Ukrayina (Україна) (Nokturnal Mortum cover)

== Filmography ==
- 2001 — Evenings on a khutor Near Dikanka as blacksmith Vakula (Вечера на хуторе близ Диканьки)
- 2002 — Cinderella as Troubadour (Золушка)
- 2006 — Terkel in Trouble (voice in Ukrainian)
- 2006 — Carlson, who lives on the roof as Carlson (voice)
- 2007 — Milkmaid of Hatsapetivka as cameo (Доярка из Хацапетовки)
- 2008 — Radio Day as cameo (День Радио)
- 2008 — Alice Birthday as Professor Seleznev (День народження Аліси)
- 2012 — After School as Ketchup (После школы)
- 2013 — My Мermaid, Мy Lorelyay as policeman (Моя Русалка, моя Лореляй)
