= Percha =

- Comune
- Gemeinde Percha; Comune di Perca
- Location within Italy Location within Trentino-Alto Adige/Südtirol
- Coordinates: 46°47′N 11°59′E
- Country: Italy
- Region: Trentino-Alto Adige/Südtirol
- Province: South Tyrol (BZ)
- Frazioni: Aschbach, Wielenberg (Sopranessano), Nasen (Nessano), Litschbach (Rio Liccio), Platten (Plata Montevila), Oberwielenbach (Vila di Sopra), Unterwielenbach (Vila di Sotto)

Government
  - Mayor: Theodor Guggenberger

Area
  - Total: 30.3 km^{2} (11.7 sq mi)

Population (Dec. 2015)
  - Total: 1,532
  - Density: 50.6/km^{2} (131/sq mi)
- Demonym(s): German: Perchiner; Italian: di Perca
- Time zone: UTC+1 (CET)
  - Summer (DST): UTC+2 (CEST)
- Postal code: 39030
- Dialing code: 0474
- Website: Official website

Percha (German pronunciation: [ˈpɛrça]; Italian: Perca [ˈpɛrka]) is a comune (municipality) and a village in South Tyrol in northern Italy, located about 60 kilometres (37 mi) northeast of Bolzano. This Percha is not to be confused with Percha of the Federal Republic of Germany.

== Geography ==
As of 31 December 2015, it had a population of 1,532 and an area of 30.3 square kilometres (11.7 mi^{2}).

Percha borders the following municipalities: Bruneck, Sand in Taufers, Gais and Rasen-Antholz.

=== Frazioni ===
The municipality of Percha contains the frazioni (subdivisions, mainly villages and hamlets) Aschbach, Wielenberg (Sopranessano), Nasen (Nessano), Litschbach (Rio Liccio), Platten (Plata Montevila), Oberwielenbach (Vila di Sopra), and Unterwielenbach (Vila di Sotto).

== History ==
=== Coat-of-arms ===
The shield is party per fess of argent and gules; a deer horn with six points is represented in the upper part, a sable plow in the lower. The deer horn symbolizes the hunting and the woods, the six points are the six villages in the municipality; the plow represents the agriculture practiced in the territory. The coat of arms was granted in 1967.

== Society ==
=== Linguistic distribution ===
According to the 2024 census, 92.97% of the population speak German, 5.99% Italian and 1.05% Ladin as first language.

=== Demographic evolution ===
Historical population

| Year | Pop. | ±% |
|---|---|---|
| 1861 | ? | — |
| 1871 | ? | — |
| 1881 | ? | — |
| 1901 | ? | — |
| 1911 | ? | — |

| Year | Pop. | ±% |
|---|---|---|
| 1921 | 728 | — |
| 1931 | 799 | +9.8% |
| 1936 | 849 | +6.3% |
| 1951 | 819 | −3.5% |
| 1961 | 821 | +0.2% |

| Year | Pop. | ±% |
|---|---|---|
| 1971 | 921 | +12.2% |
| 1981 | 1,083 | +17.6% |
| 1991 | 1,172 | +8.2% |
| 2001 | 1,313 | +12.0% |

Source: Data from ISTAT
