= Ukrainian surnames =

Ukrainian surnames have a wide variety of origins, and have been historically derived from placenames, patronymics or matronymics, physical and personality features etc. By the 18th century, almost all Ukrainians had family names. Just like in other Slavic languages, most Ukrainian surnames are formed by adding possessive and other suffixes to given names, place names, professions and other words.

== History ==
Surnames were developed for official documents or business record keeping to differentiate the parties who might have the same first name. By the 15th century, surnames were used by the upper class, nobles and large land owners. In cities and towns, surnames became necessary in the 15th and 16th centuries. In 1632, Orthodox Metropolitan Petro Mohyla ordered priests to include a surname in all records of birth, marriage and death.

Early historical examples of Ukrainian surnames derive from both native and foreign vocabulary, for example Vyshenskyi (from the city of Vyshnia), Khmelnytskyi, Zyzaniy (translation of native Ukrainian surname Kukil), Berynda etc.

After the partitions of Poland (1772–1795), Western Ukraine came under the Austrian Empire, where peasants needed surnames for taxation purposes and military service and churches were required to keep records of all births, deaths and marriages.

The surnames with the suffix -enko are the most known and common Ukrainian surnames. Due to migration and deportations of Ukrainians during the history, they are also present in Belarus and Russia, especially in the Kuban region, where many ethnic Ukrainians historically lived.

== Suffixes ==
Most widespread types of Ukrainian surnames
(% by locality)

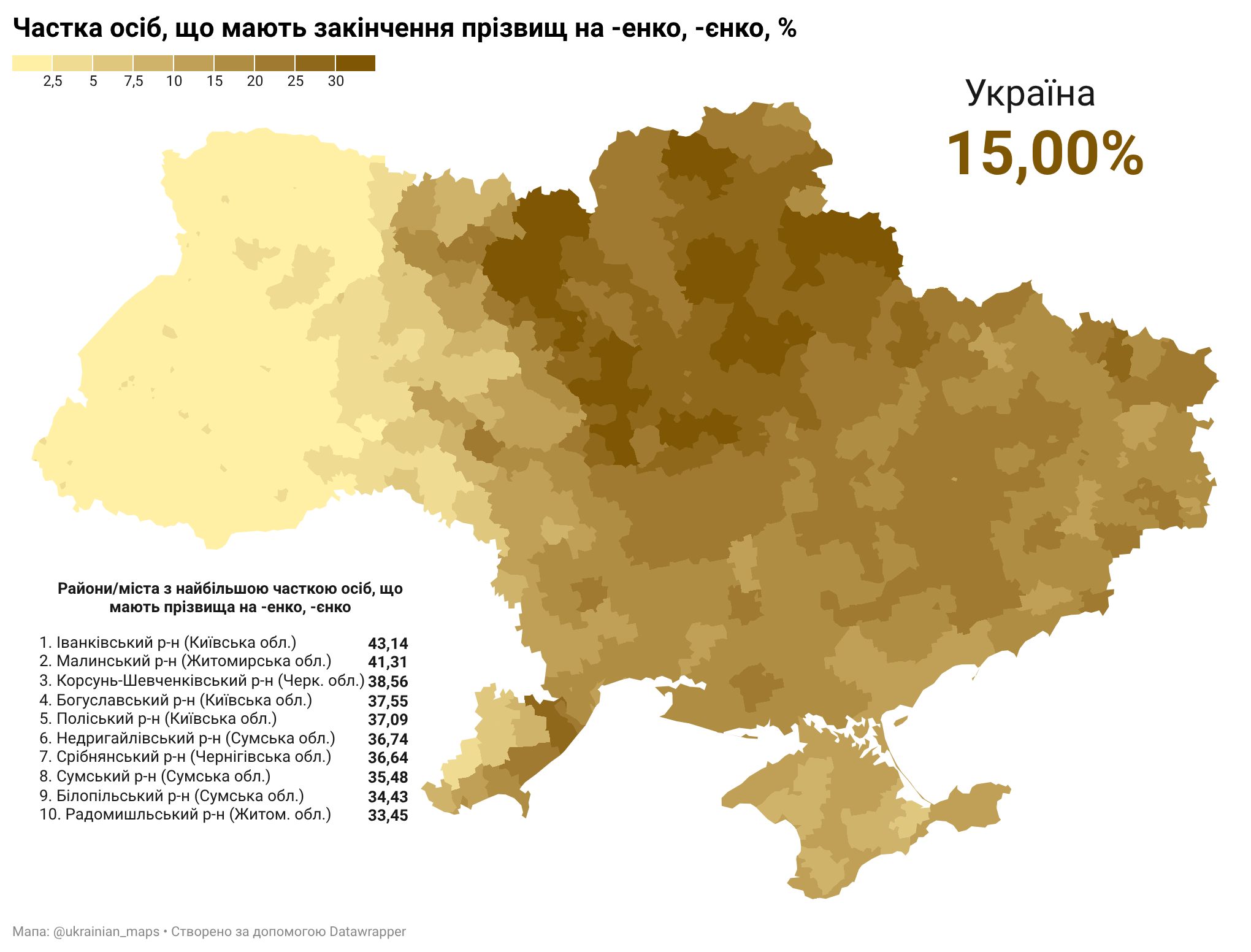
Surnames with the suffix -enko

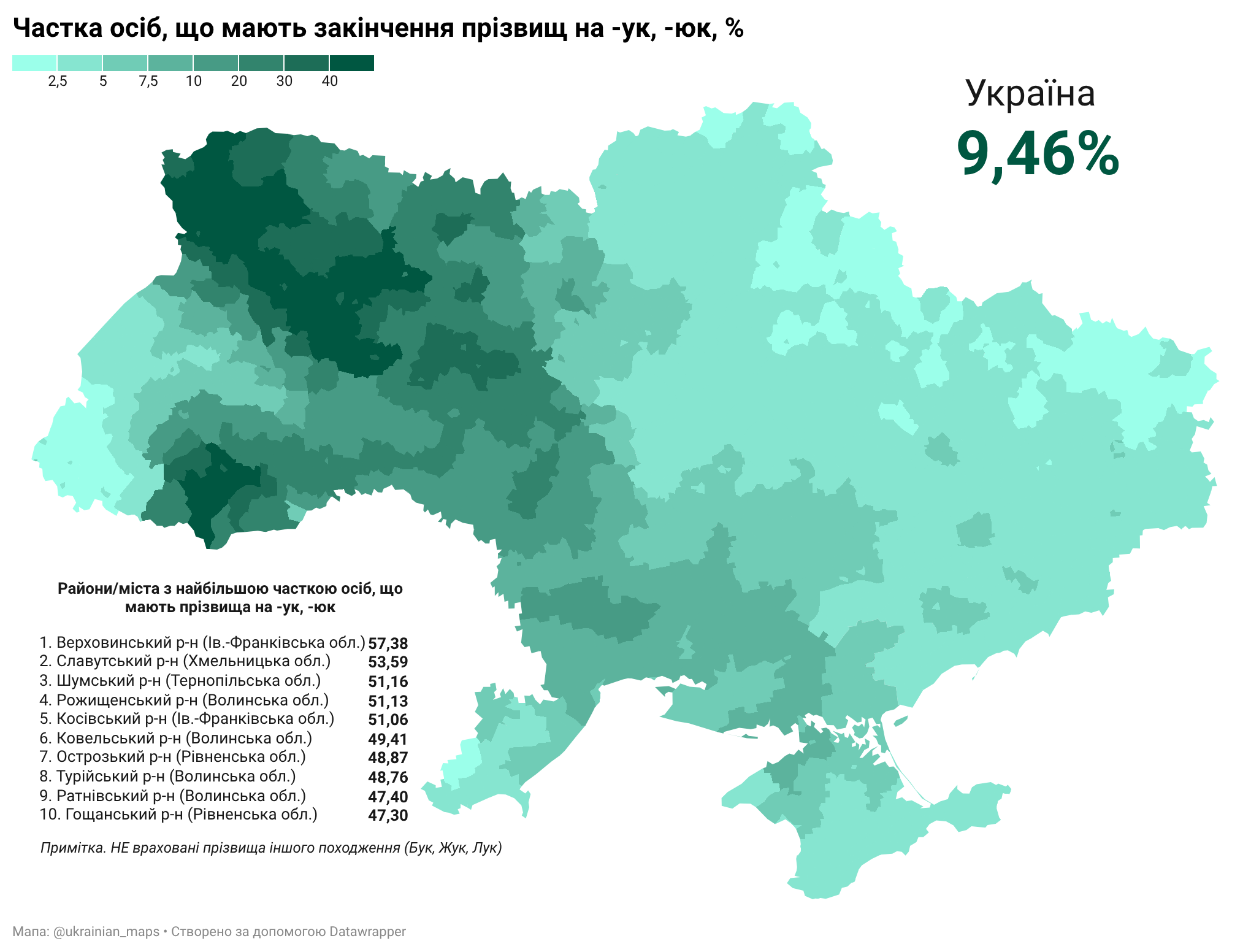
Surnames with the suffix -uk

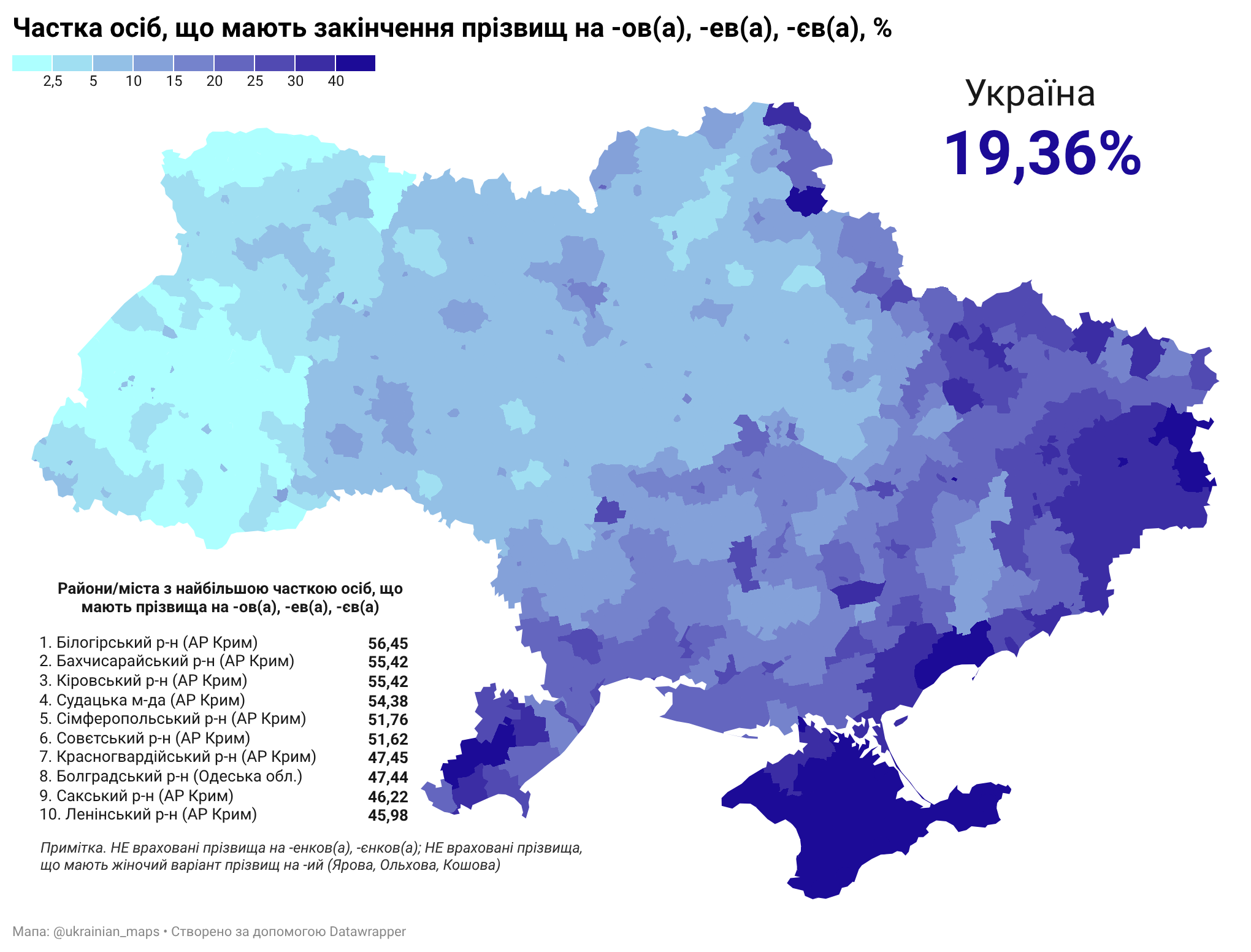
Surnames with the suffix -ov(a), -ev(a)

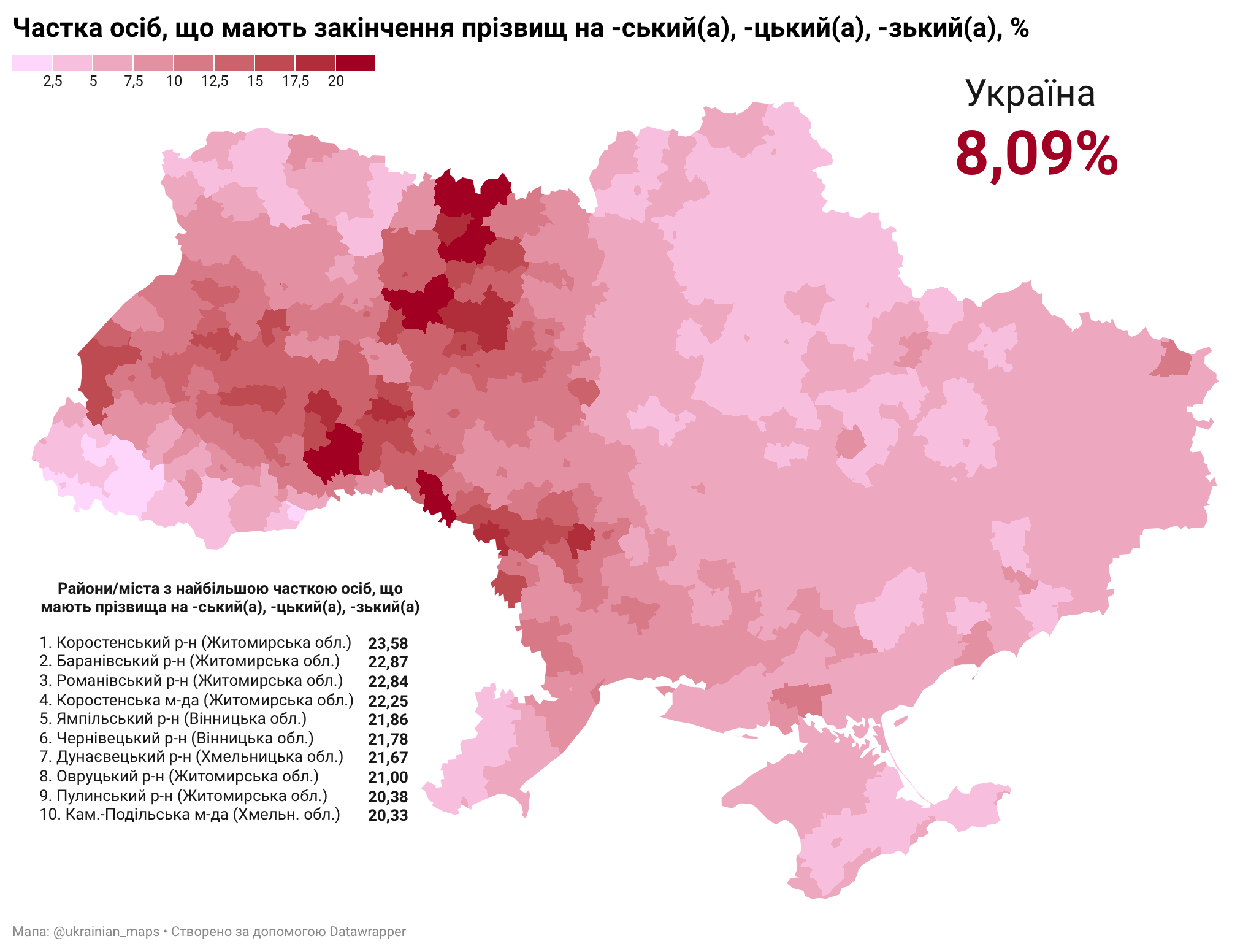
Surnames with the suffix -s'k(yi/a), -z'k(yi/a)

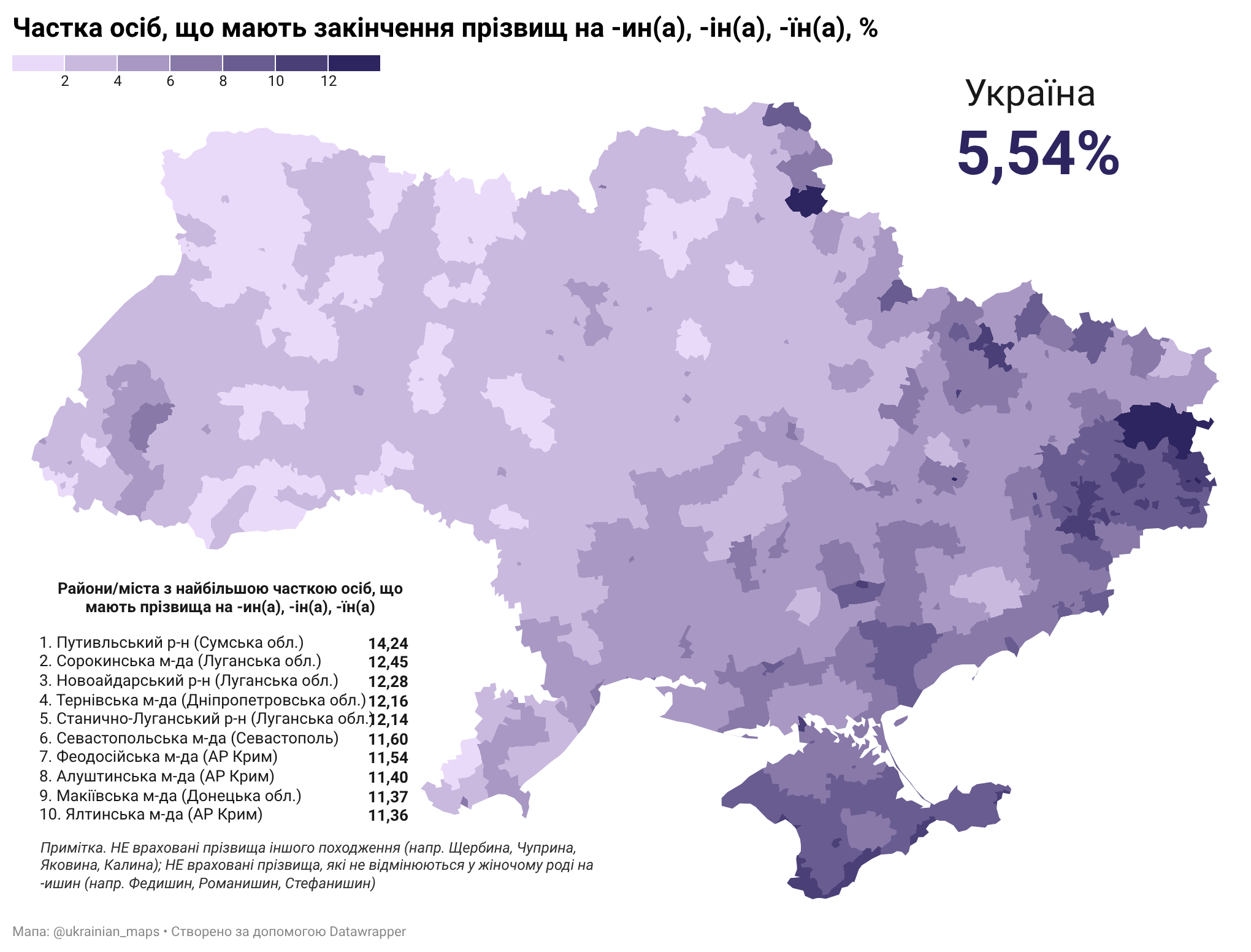
Surnames with the suffix -yn(a), -in(a)

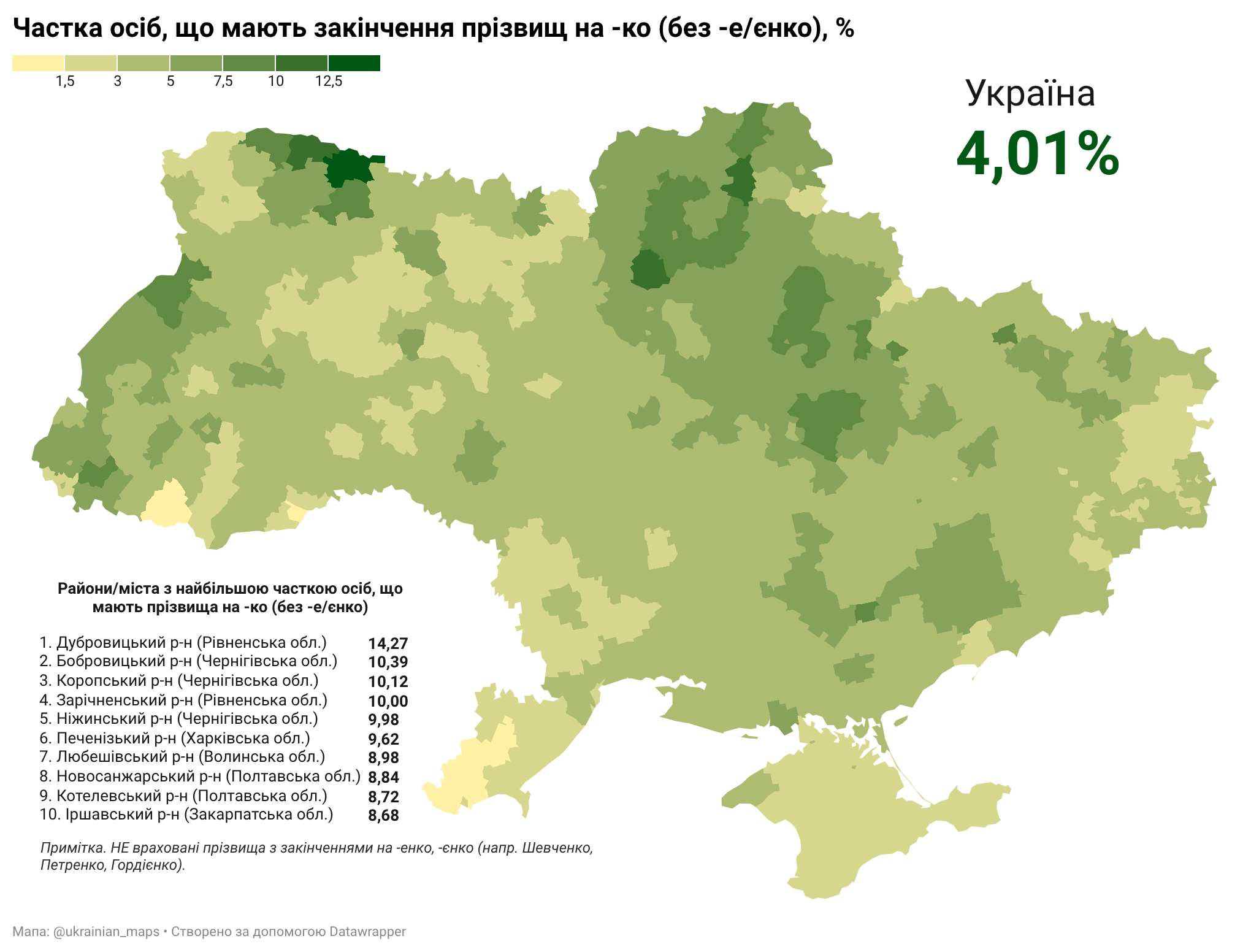
Surnames with suffix -ko

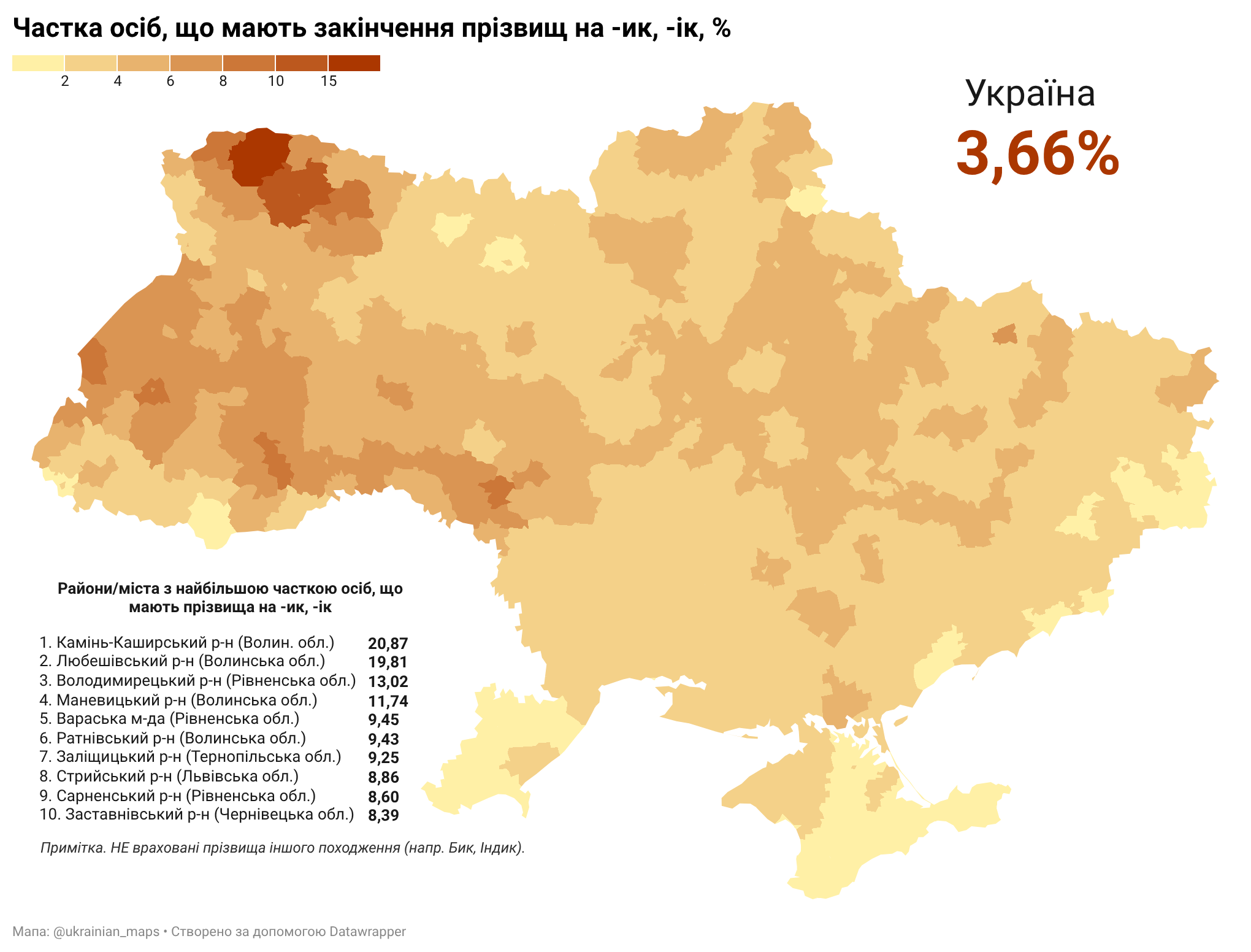
Surnames with suffix -yk, -ik

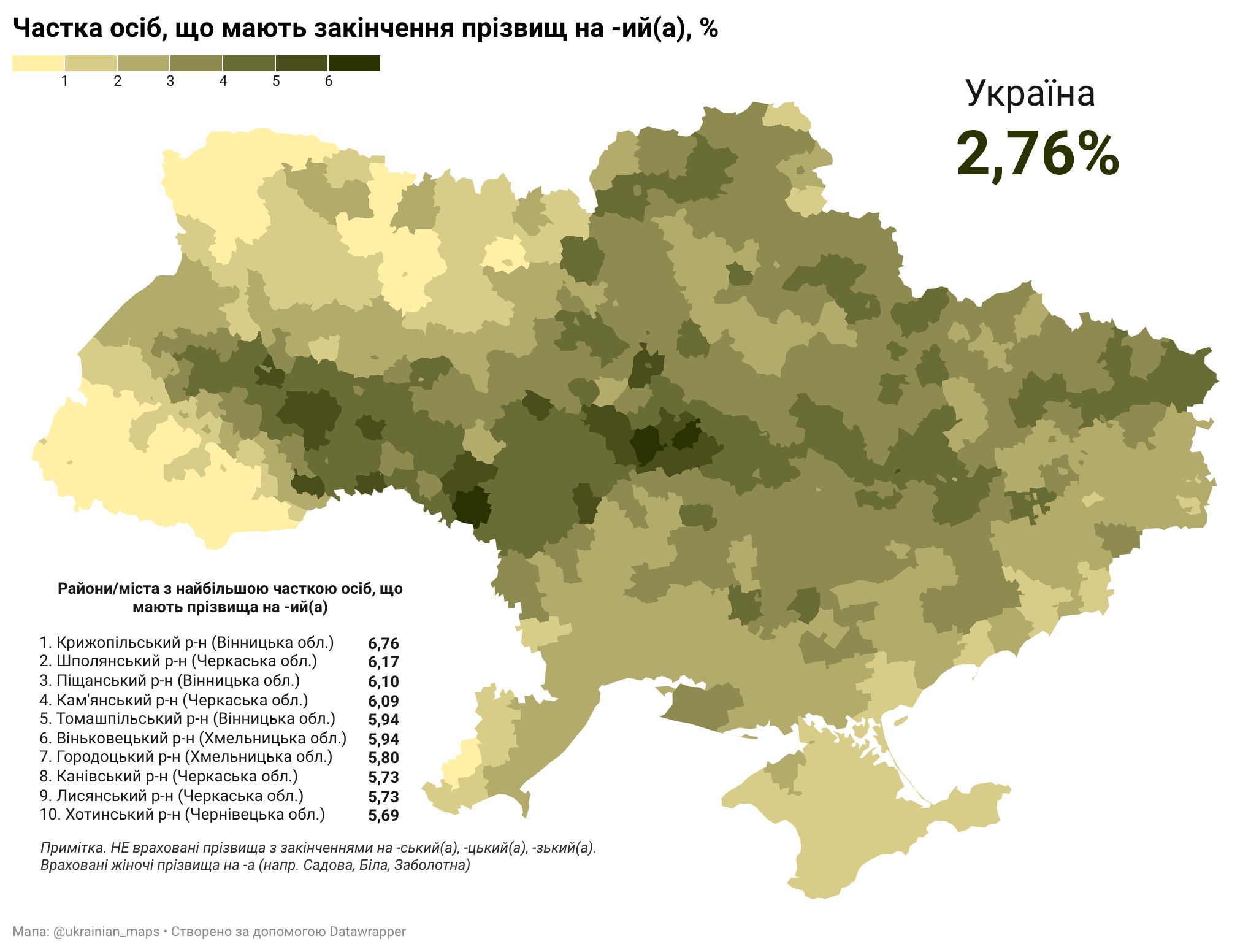
Adjective surnames

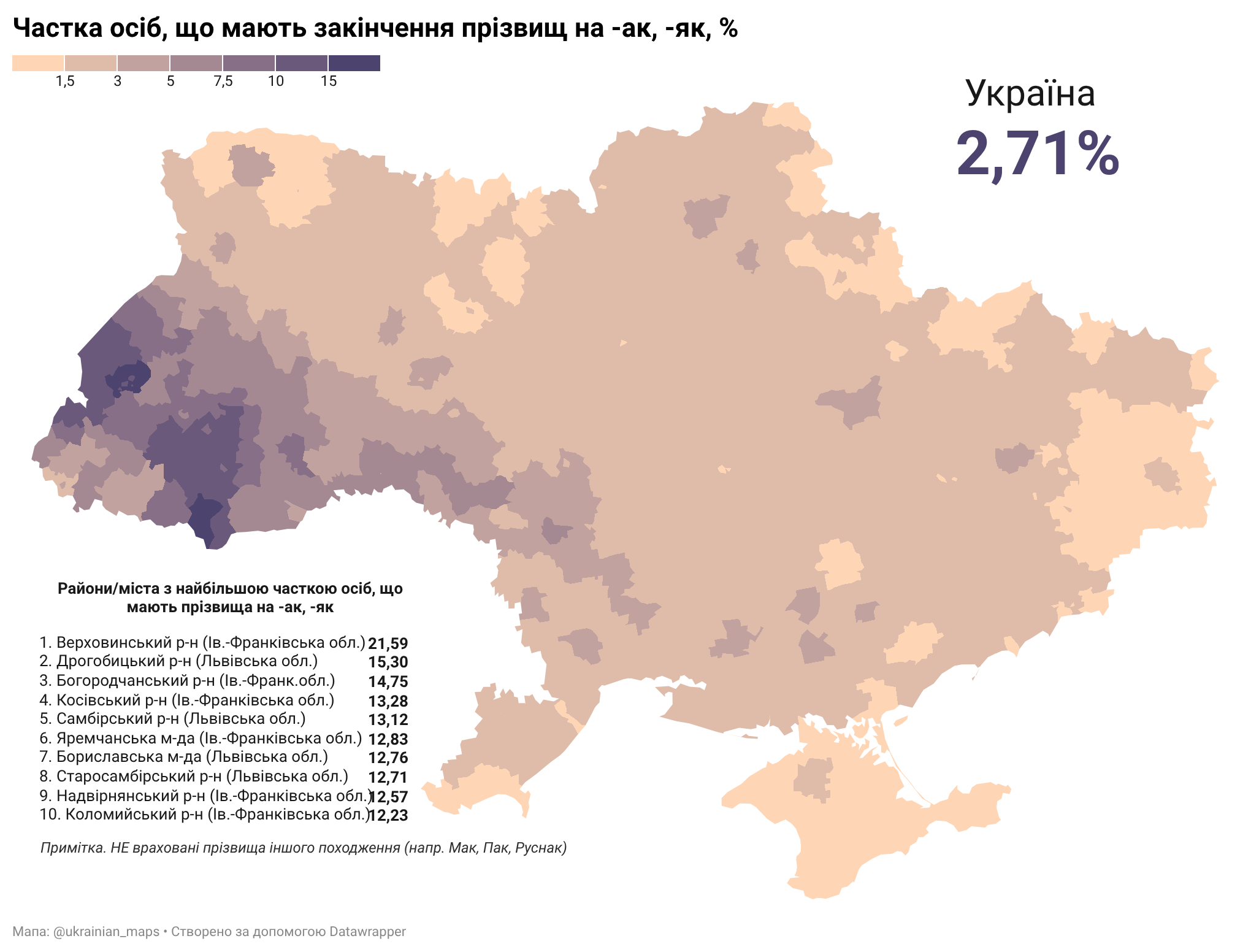
Surnames with suffix -ak

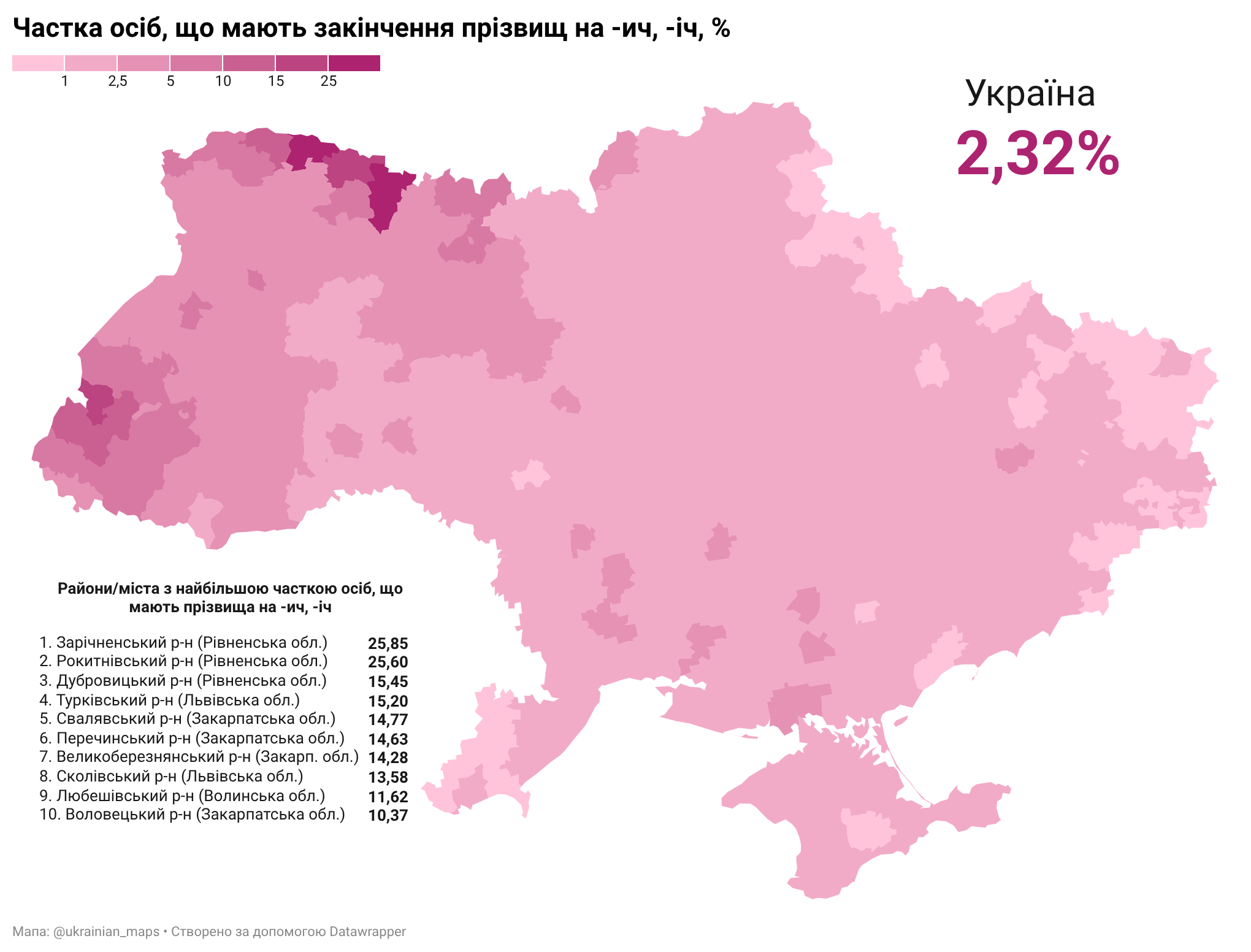
Surnames with suffix -ich, -ych

Common suffixes in Ukrainian names are:

- -enko (-енко) (Шевченко, Гордієнко, Коваленко, Зінченко, Бондаренко, Кравченко, Войтенко, Ткаченко, Порошенко), distinctively Ukrainian, first recorded in the 15th century.
- -chuk (-чук) or -chak (-чак) (Поліщук, Паламарчук, Баланчук, Максимчак) or its simplified versions -iuk/-uk (-юк/-ук) or -iak (-як) and -ak (-ак) (Палагнюк, Мочуляк, Романюк). The suffixes -uk/-iuk are considered to be patronymic.
- -yshyn (Панчишин, Костишин, Романишин). Such suffixes are simply added to Ukrainian given names. These are considered matronymic.
- -skyi (-ський) (Тарновський, Зеленський), toponymic, originally from aristocratic usage but then generalized. Ukrainian version of surnames ending in -ski, common in Polish-Lithuanian Commonwealth (Rzeczpospolita).
- -vych (-вич) (Шухевич, Петрушевич, Андрушевич, Шушкевич, Горлукович). Common with neighboring Belarus, descending from the common Rzeczpospolita culture (-wicz).
- -ko (-ко), a diminutive ending often with patronymic meaning (Сірко, Павличко, Бойко).
- -iv (-ів), an old-Ruthenian/Rusyn type surnames (Тимків, Василів, Григорів)
- Less common suffixes that may identify Ukrainian origin are -ra (-ра), -ha (-га) or -ho (-го), -ukh (-ух), -un (-ун), -ash (-аш), -la (-ла) or -lo (-ло) (Ванжура, Вервега, Андрух, Ковтун, Кайдаш), series of -aba (-аба), -yba (-иба), and -uba (-уба), also -iush (-юш) (Плюш) and -ii (-ій) (Вертій).

Some names have differing masculine and feminine forms, meaning a brother and sister's surname will be inflected with different suffixes (such as Zelenskyi/Зеленський and Zelenska/Зеленська). Others (such as the distinctively Ukrainian names ending in -enko) do not change with grammatical gender.

== First elements ==
The first elements of Ukrainian surnames are most commonly given names (patronymics and matronymics), place names (toponyms), and professions.

=== Patronymic surnames ===
From the first name Ivan (John in English), over 100 different surnames can be formed. The most common variations of Ivan in Ukrainian are Ivas, Jan, Vakhno, and Vanko. Among surnames based on the name Ivan are Ivanenko, Ivaniv, Ivankiv, Ivasiv, Ivashchenko, Ivanyshyn, Ivakhiv, Janiv, Jankiv, and Ivaniuk. More examples of surnames based on a first name:

- Andrii (Andrew): Andriiash, Andriiets, Andrusyshyn
- Hryhorii (Gregory): Hryniuk, Hryniv, Hryhoruk
- Mykhailo (Michael): Mykhailuk
- Pavlo (Paul): Pavlovych, Pavliuk, Pavluk
- Savko (Savva): Savchuk
- Stepan (Steven): Stefaniuk, Stefanyk
- Danylo (Daniel): Danyliuk

Less common are Ukrainian patronymic surnames ending with -ich, -ych (Voyislavych, Radovych, Andrukhovych) and -at (Shchurat, Khronovyat).

=== Matronymic surnames ===
When a woman was married, she was known by a form of her husband's first name or her father's, if she was not. From the name Petro, she was Petrykha (wife of Petro). From these forms, matronymic surnames ending in -yshyn were created. Petryshyn came from Petrykha, Romanyshyn from Romanykha and Ivanyshyn from Ivanykha. Surnames based on women's names exist (from variants of Maria: Marunchak from Marunia, Marusiak, Marushchak, from "Marusia").. Sofiya->Софієнко (Sofiyenko), Halya-> Halenko, Halenkov.

Other examples of Ukrainian matronymic surnames are Olenych (from Olena), Malaniuk (from Malania), Dotsenko (from Dotsia), Havrylyshyn (from Havrylykha - wife of Havrylo) etc.

=== Toponymic surnames ===
Some Ukrainian toponymic surnames can be identified as stemming from the Galicia region. Those surnames often contain the suffixes -ets or -iets (Kolomiyets, Pereyaslavets, Tershakovets).

The surnames ending with -skyi were originally aristocratic and indicated the principal manor (similar to the European "von ...", "de ..." etc.) but from the late Middle Ages they became increasingly common and simply denoted the bearer's origin from a specific town or village, e.g. Khmelnytskyi = "of/from Khmilnyk" (historically Khmelnyk), Vyshenskyi (from [Sudova] Vyshnia), Turivskyi (Turiv), Stryiskyi (Stryi) etc.

Ukrainian toponymic surnames can also take other forms, for example Voloshchak (from Wallachia).

=== Occupational surnames ===
- Bondar (Bodnar, Bondaruk) — barrel maker, cooper
- Honchar (Honcharenko, Honcharuk) — potter, ceramist
- Kolisnyk (Kolisnychenko) — wheelwright
- Koval (Kovalchenko, Kovalenko, Kovalchuk) — smith
- Kravets (Kravchenko, Kravchuk) — tailor
- Kushnir (Kushnirenko, Kushniruk) — furrier
- Oliinyk (Oliynyk) — vegetable oil-manufacturer
- Palamar (Ponomarchuk, Ponomarenko, Palamarchuk) – clergyman (altar server)
- Skliar — glazier
- Chumak — salt-trader
- Kramar — store owner

=== Ethnonymic surnames ===
Names that show ethnic, national or tribal origins other than Ukrainian.

- Nimets, "German person"
- Tataryn, from Tatar, the Turkic people of the "Golden Horde".
- Voloshyn, from Volokh, a medieval generic name for Romanians and Moldovans.

=== Personal features as source for surnames ===
Physical features: Kryvyi ("crooked"), Syvenkyi ("grey-haired"), Chornenkyi ("black"), Bezpalko ("fingerless"), Kryvonis ("crooked nose"), Lysyi ("bald").

Personality features: Osmomysl ("eight-minded"), Nechai ("unexpected"), Sviatyi ("saint"), Bezhrishnyi ("sinless"), Mnohohrishnyi ("of many sins"), Samokhval ("boastful").

Animal names (euphemistic): Vovk ("wolf"), Lys ("fox"), Zayats ("hare"), Chaplia ("heron"), Kohut ("rooster"), Kit ("cat") etc.

Nicknames: Khotyliub ("ladies' man"), Vertyporokh ("easy going"), Durniaha ("fool"), Patyk ("stick"), Nedovarenyi ("undercooked"), Napuda ("fearful") etc.

=== Cossack names ===
There are also old Cossack names that derive from military occupations, such as Kompaniiets or Kompanichenko. There are also surnames derived from monikers based on personal characteristics. Those are considered to derive directly from the usage of monikers instead of actual names due to nature of occupation. These compounds, usually consisting of a second person-singular-addressed imperative verb or an adjective coupled with a noun, can often be somewhat comical such as:

Name	Literal meaning
Chornovil	Black ox
Chornyi	Black (adj.)
Holodryha	Nude twitch
Kandyba	Useless (crippled) (Note: In Ukrainian Kandyba has a verbal form (kandybaty) which means physical limitations when moving on foot.) horse
Kryvonis	Curved nose
Lomachenko	Breaker (Lomaka) [+enko]
Nebaba	[Is] not a woman
Neizhpapa	Do not eat bread (2nd pers. imp.)
Otchenash	Our Father! (voc.)
Perebyinis	Break the nose (2nd pers. imp.)
Salohub / Sologub	Salo lips
Vernydub	Twist the oak (2nd pers. imp.)
Vernyhora	Twist the mountain (2nd pers. imp.)

Such surnames are primarily derived from a funny memorable situation or a phrase coined by the person, who eventually received such a name, and supposedly originated in the 15th–16th centuries with the start of the Cossack movement.

Among Cossacks were also much simplified nature-derived last names such as Hohol (topknot), Orel (eagle), Bakai/Bakay/Bakaj (pothole), Horobets (sparrow), Vedmid (bear), Moroz (frost), Kulish (Cossack soup), Skovoroda (frying pan), Harbuz (pumpkin), Vovk (wolf), and many more that are common nouns of the Ukrainian language. Other Cossack last names were based on personality characteristics, e.g. Babii (womanizer), Dovhopiat (long foot), Dryhalo (twitchy person), Kovtun (mopheaded person), Malyuk (tiny or baby-faced individual), Nechuy (deaf person), Nudylo (tedious person), Plaksa (crybaby), Pribluda (bastard), Prylypko (sticky person), Sverbylo (itchy person), Vereshchaka (shrieking person/name of a traditional dish), Vytrishchaka (goggling person), etc.

An important source on Ukrainian Cossack surnames is the 1649 Registry of the Zaporozhian Host, which includes the name of over 40,000 Registered Cossacks.

== Most common surnames in Ukraine ==
The table below is provided by "Ridni.org" Ukrainian genealogical portal (data for 2011–2013).

#	Name	Ukrainian	Meaning	Number	Predominant in regions
1	Melnyk	Мельник	Miller	107878	Ivano-Frankivsk, Khmelnytskyi, Lviv, Vinnytsia
2	Shevchenko	Шевченко	Shoemaker's son	106340	Cherkasy, Dnipropetrovsk, Kharkiv, Kirovohrad, Kyiv, Mykolaiv, Poltava, Sumy, Zaporizhia
3	Kovalenko	Коваленко	Smith's son	88632	Chernihiv, Dnipropetrovsk, Kherson, Kyiv, Poltava, Cherkasy
4	Bondarenko	Бондаренко	Cooper's son	88133	Dnipropetrovsk, Donetsk, Kharkiv, Luhansk, Odesa, Poltava, Zaporizhia
5	Ivanov(a)	Іванов	John's	84096	Crimea, Donetsk, Mykolaiv, Odesa, Sevastopol, Zaporizhia
6	Boyko	Бойко	Boyko or from бій (fight, combat)	83195	Ivano-Frankivsk, Ternopil
7	Tkachenko	Ткаченко	Weaver's son	82270	Cherkasy, Kharkiv, Kirovohrad, Kyiv, Mykolaiv, Sumy
8	Kravchenko	Кравченко	Tailor's son	75456	Chernihiv, Kherson
9	Kovalchuk	Ковальчук	Smith's son	70410	Khmelnytskyi, Rivne, Volyn, Zhytomyr
10	Koval	Коваль	Smith	62232	Lviv

== See also ==
- Ukrainian name
- Slavic names
- Slavic name suffixes
