= Boyko (name) =

Boyko or Boiko (Cyrillic: Бойко, Polish: Bojko) is one of the most common surnames in Ukraine, which is also widespread in countries such as Russia, Canada, United States and other lands with a history of immigration from Ukraine.

It is also found in South Slavic countries, as a form of the name Бојан/Bojan (Boyan). The surname Boiko is also common amongst Ashkenazi Jews (amongst whom it is spelled as 'Boiko' or 'Boico'), and possibly it is a form of 'Boge', or 'boikil' meaning "quick". In Western Ukraine, it might originate from the name of a highlanders tribe.

It may also be a masculine given name in Bulgaria.

== People ==
=== Surname ===
- Aleksandra Boiko (1918–1996), Soviet tank commander
- Andriy Boyko (born 1981), Ukrainian footballer
- Bohdan Boyko (born 1954), Ukrainian politician
- Brett Boyko (born 1992), Canadian football player
- Christopher A. Boyko (born 1954), American lawyer
- Darren Boyko (born 1964), Canadian ice hockey player
- Denys Boyko (born 1988), Ukrainian footballer
- Dmytro Boyko (born 1981), Ukrainian footballer
- Dmytro Boiko (born 1986), Ukrainian fencer
- Edgar Paul Boyko (1918–2002), American lawyer
- Eugene Boyko (1923–2003), Canadian film maker
- Georgi Boyko (1933–2002), Soviet and Ukrainian geologist
- Iulian Boiko (born 2005), Ukrainian snooker player
- Ivan Boyko (1910–1975), Soviet hero
- Natalya Boyko (1946–1996), Soviet canoeist
- Mark Boyko, American politician
- Oleg Boyko (born 1964), Russian oligarch
- Roman Boyko (born 1977), Russian politician
- Sergei Boyko (born 1971), Russian footballer
- Svetlana Boyko (born 1972), Russian fencer
- Vadzim Boyka, also Vadim Boyko (born 1978), Belarusian footballer
- Vitaliy Boyko (born 1997), Ukrainian footballer
- Volodymyr Boyko (1938–2015), Ukrainian entrepreneur and politician
- Yaroslav Boyko (born 1970), Russian actor
- Yuriy Boyko (born 1958), Ukrainian politician

=== Given name ===
- Boyko Aleksiev (born 1963), Bulgarian figure skater
- Boyko Borisov (born 1959), Prime Minister of Bulgaria
- Boyko Kamenov (born 1975), Bulgarian football manager and player
- Boyko Rashkov (born 1954), Bulgarian lawyer, state official and politician
- Boyko Vasilev (born 1970), Bulgarian journalist
- Boyko Velichkov (born 1974), Bulgarian footballer
- Boyko Yaroslava Yuriyivna (born 1982), Ukrainian magazine director
- Boiko Zvetanov (born 1955), Bulgarian opera singer

== See also ==
- Ukrainian surnames
- Boykos, a group of Ukrainian Carpathian people
- Boyka
- Boykin
