= Bakai (disambiguation) =

Bakai is a Bangladeshi village.

Bakai may also refer to:

- Bakai, Kėdainiai, former Lithuanian settlement
- Ihor Bakai, Ukrainian statesman, and politician, Director of the Naftogaz (1998–2000)
- József Bakai (born 1942), Hungarian athlete

== See also ==
- Bakaj
- Bakay
