= Kravchenko =

Kravchenko, also Krawchenko, Krawczenko or Kravtchenko (Сyrillic: Кравченко) is a common Ukrainian surname, widely found in the former Soviet Union and respective diasporas abroad. It is an occupational surname of patronymic derivation, based on the occupation of kravets (кравець), or 'tailor' and literally meaning "child of tailor". Other Ukrainian surnames of similar derivation are Kravchuk and Kravets.

It may refer to the following people:

- Aleksei Ilyich Kravchenko (1889–1940), Russian painter, illustrator, draughtsman and printmaker
- Aleksei Kravchenko (actor) (Aleksei Yevgenyevich Kravchenko, born 1969), Soviet and Russian actor
- Aleksei Igorevich Kravchenko (* 1986), Russian diver, took part in Diving at the 2009 World Aquatics Championships – Men's 10 metre platform
- Alex Kravchenko (born 1971), Russian professional poker player
- Alexander Kravchenko, several persons
- Andrei Kravchenko (disambiguation), several persons
- Anzhela Kravchenko (born 1971), Ukrainian sprinter
- Dmytro Kravchenko (born 1995), Ukrainian football player
- Fyodor Iosifovich Kravchenko (1912–1988), Soviet army officer and Hero of the Soviet Union
- Grigory Kravchenko (1912–1943), Soviet aircraft pilot and twice Hero of the Soviet Union
- Ivan Khotovich Kravchenko (1921–1945), Soviet army officer and Hero of the Soviet Union
- Ivan Yakovlevich Kravchenko (1905–1942), Soviet army officer and Hero of the Soviet Union
- Kostyantyn Kravchenko (born 1986), Ukrainian football player
- Marina Kravchenko (born 1975), Israeli table tennis player
- Mykhailo Kravchenko (1858–1917), Kobzar from Poltava
- Mykola Kravchenko (1983–2022), Ukrainian public and political figure
- Mykyta Kravchenko (born 1997), Ukrainian football player
- Nikolai Grigoryevich Kravchenko (born 1923), Soviet soldier and Full Cavalier of the Order of Glory
- Nicolai Ivanovich Kravchenko (1867–1941), Russian battle painter, journalist and writer
- Nikolai Vasilyevich Kravchenko (born 1952), Soviet army officer and Hero of the Soviet Union
- Oleksandr Kravchenko (born 1983), Ukrainian politician
- Serhiy Kravchenko (born 1983), Ukrainian football player
- Serhiy Kravchenko (born 1990), Ukrainian football player
- Valentina Kravchenko (1917–2000), squadron navigator during World War II and Hero of the Russian Federation
- Valeri Kravchenko (1939–1995), Soviet volleyball player
- Vasili Kravchenko (1923–1944), Soviet army officer and Hero of the Soviet Union
- Victor Kravchenko (defector) (1905–1966), Soviet defector
- Viktor Kravchenko (athlete) (born 1941), Soviet triple jumper
- Volodymyr Kravchenko (triple jumper) (born 1969), Ukrainian triple jumper
- Yuriy Kravchenko (1951–2005), Ukrainian police officer and statesman
