= Dancha =

Dancha is a Ukrainian surname. Notable people with the surname include:

- Annamari Dancha (born 1990), Ukrainian snowboarder
- Ivan Dancha (fl. 2011), Ukrainian boxer and coach
