= Bondarenko =

Bondarenko (Ukrainian: Бондаренко) is a Ukrainian surname (from Ukrainian: бондар, "cooper"), used by the following people:

- Alona Bondarenko (born 1984), Ukrainian tennis player, sister and tennis doubles partner of Kateryna Bondarenko
- Andriy Bondarenko (born 1987), Ukrainian opera singer
- Andriy Bondarenko (born 1978), Ukrainian composer and pianist
- Artem Bondarenko (born 2001), Ukrainian footballer
- Bohdan Bondarenko (born 1989), Ukrainian high jumper
- Joseph Bondarenko (born 1936), Ukrainian author, theologian, public speaker
- Kateryna Bondarenko (born 1986), Ukrainian tennis player, sister and tennis doubles partner of Alona Bondarenko
- Maksim Bondarenko (1981–2025), Russian footballer
- Maria Bondarenko (born 2003), Russian tennis player
- Nikolai Bondarenko (born 1985), Russian opposition politician
- Nikolai Bondarenko (born 1958), Russian politician
- Oleksandr Bondarenko (disambiguation), several people
- Olena Bondarenko (born 1974), Ukrainian politician
- Olena Bondarenko (born 1955), Ukrainian politician and writer
- Olga Bondarenko (born 1960), Soviet long-distance runner
- Roman Bondarenko (born 1966), Turkmenistani former international footballer
- Svitlana Bondarenko (born 1971), Ukrainian swimmer
- Taras Bondarenko (born 1992), Ukrainian footballer
- Valentin Bondarenko (1937–1961), Soviet cosmonaut
- Valeria Bondarenko (born 1982), Ukrainian former tennis player and elder sister of Alona and Kateryna Bondarenko

Bondarenko may also refer to

- Bondarenko, a lunar impact crater named after a Soviet cosmonaut Valentin Bondarenko

== See also ==
- Bandarenka
