= Datsenko =

Datsenko (Ukrainian: Даценко) is a Ukrainian surname. Notable people with this surname include:

- Alisa Datsenko (born 2010), German rhythmic gymnast
- Olha Datsenko (1903-1993), Ukrainian theater actress
- Serhiy Datsenko (born 1977), Ukrainian footballer
- Serhiy Datsenko (born 1987), Ukrainian footballer
- Semen Datsenko (born 1994), Ukrainian footballer

== See also ==
- Dotsenko
