= Dovhan =

Dovhan (Ukrainian: Довгань), Dovgan, Dolgan, Douhan (Belarusian: Доўгань), Dołhan or Dowhan, is a surname. Notable people with the surname include:

- Alena Douhan, Belarusian United Nations special rapporteur
- Iryna Dovhan (born 1962), Ukrainian hostage survivor
- Jerzy Dołhan (born 1964), Polish badminton player
- Mihai Dolgan (1942–2008), Moldovan musician
- Mihail Dolgan (1939–2013), Moldovan writer
- Mykola Dovhan (born 1955), Ukrainian rower
- Robert Dowhan (born 1967), Polish politician
- Stefania Dovhan, Ukrainian-American soprano
- Viktor Dovgan (born 1987), Russian ice hockey player

== See also ==
- L-vocalization, Kovtun
