= Oleksandr Honchar =

Oleksandr Honchar (Ukrainian: Олександр Гончар) is a name of several individuals from Ukraine.

It may refer to:

- Oles Honchar, Ukrainian writer
- Oleksandr Honchar (footballer), Ukrainian football player, midfielder

== See also ==
- Honchar
