= Nebaba =

Nebaba is a Ukrainian surname of Ukrainian Cossack origin literally meaning "not a woman". Notable people with the surname include:

- Birth name of Lidia Valenta
- Martyn Nebaba (early 17th century - 1651) - Colonel Borzensky; Colonel Chernihiv; Acting Hetman of the Ukrainian army in the Grand Duchy of Lithuania; Acting Hetman of the Left-Bank Regiments of Ukraine
