= Bodnar =

Bodnar or Bodnár is a surname. Notable people with the surname include:

- Adam Bodnar (born 1977), Polish lawyer, educator, human rights activist and politician
- Alexandru Bodnar (born 1990), Romanian archer
- András Bodnár (born 1942), Hungarian water polo player and freestyle swimmer
- Andrew Bodnar (1954–2026), English bass guitarist
- Gizella Bodnár (1926–2019), Hungarian criminal
- Gus Bodnar (1923–2005), Canadian ice hockey player
- Jana Bodnárová (born 1950), Slovak writer
- Janet Bodnar, American journalist
- Lajos Bodnar, Hungarian sprint canoeist
- László Bodnár (born 1979), Hungarian footballer
- Leslie Bodnar (1916–2014), American surgeon
- Lisa Bodnar, American nutritional and perinatal epidemiologist
- Łukasz Bodnar (born 1982), Polish cyclist
- Maciej Bodnar (born 1985), Polish cyclist
- Morris Bodnar (1948–2026), Canadian politician
- Olga Bodnar (born 1965), Ukrainian politician
- Sándor Bodnár (1890–1955), Hungarian footballer
- Seth Bodnar (born 1979), American academic administrator and U.S. Senate candidate
- Vladimir Bodnar (born 1942), Transnistrian politician

== See also ==
- Bondar
