= Colesnic =

Colesnic is a Romanian borrowing of the Slavic occupational surname Kolesnik literally meaning "wheelwright". Notable people with the surname include:

- Călin Colesnic, better known as Colin Kolles (born 1967), Romanian-German F1 team director
- Iurie Colesnic (born 1955), Moldovan politician
- Leonid Colesnic, Moldovan wrestler
