= Wowk =

Wowk may refer to:

- Brian Wowk, Canadian medical physicist
- Jens Ole Wowk McCoy
- Wowk Elementary School, school in British Columbia, Canada
- WOWK-TV, American television station

== See also ==
- Vovk
- Wouk
