= Harbuz =

Harbuz (Гарбуз, sometimes transliterated as Garbuz) is a Belarusian and Ukrainian surname literally meaning "pumpkin". Notable people with the surname include:

- Ann Alexandra Harbuz, Canadian artist
- Hleb Harbuz, Belarusian handball player
- Ion Harbuz, Bessarabian politician
- Konstantin Garbuz, Russian footballer
- Oleksandr Harbuz, soldier of the Armed Forces of Ukraine
- Volodymyr Harbuz, Ukrainian painter and graphic artist
- Yair Garbuz, Israeli artist
- Yuriy Harbuz, Ukrainian politician
