= Ivashchenko =

Ivashchenko, sometimes Ivaschenko (Ukrainian: Іва́щенко) is a Ukrainian surname that may refer to the following notable people:

- Aleksei Ivashchenko (born 1958), Soviet/Russian singer-songwriter, member of the duo Ivasi
- Yuri Ivashchenko (born 1961), Ukrainian astronomer
- Valeriy Ivashchenko (born 1956), Deputy Minister of Defense of Ukraine in 2007–2009
- Elena Ivashchenko (born 1984), Russian judoka
- Konstantin Ivashchenko (born 1963), Russian and Ukrainian politician and businessman, de facto mayor of Mariupol in 2022–2023
- Oleh Ivashchenko, Ukrainian general
- Oleh Ivashchenko, retired footballer
- Oleksandr Ivashchenko (born 1985), Ukrainian football player
- Valeriy Ivashchenko (born 1956), Ukrainian military officer and deputy minister of defence

== See also ==
- Ivashchenko, Belgorod Oblast, a rural locality in Russia.
