= Kompaniyets =

Kompaniyets,Kompaniiets (Ukrainian: Компанієць) is a Ukrainian surname. Kompaneyets (Russian: Компанеец) is a Russian-language form. Companeez is a French form of the surname. Notable people with the surname include:

- Jacques Companeez (1906–1956), Russian (Ukrainian)-born French screenwriter
- Nina Companeez (1937–2015), French screenwriter and film director
- Abba Kompaneyets
- Alexander Kompaneyets
- Grigory Kompaneyets
- Iryna Kompaniiets
- Viktor Kompaniyets, Russian and Soviet physicist
