= Honcharuk =

Honcharuk or Goncharuk (Ukrainian: Гончарук) is a Ukrainian surname. It is derived from the Ukrainian word honchar (Ukrainian: гончар), "potter", and the suffix -uk, denoting descent. It is also related to Honcharyk (Ukrainian: Гончарик), a less common Ukrainian surname.

== People ==
- Andrii Goncharuk (born 1961), Ukrainian diplomat
- Danylo Honcharuk (born 2002), Ukrainian footballer
- Oleksiy Honcharuk (born 1984), Ukrainian politician
- Pavlo Honcharuk (born 1978), Ukrainian Roman Catholic prelate

== Related surnames ==
- Honchar
- Honcharenko
