= Kichenok =

Kichenok (Ukrainian: Кіченок) is a Ukrainian surname. Notable people with the surname include:

- Lyudmyla Kichenok (born 1992), Ukrainian tennis player
- Nadiia Kichenok (born 1992), Ukrainian tennis player
