= Kryvonis =

Kryvonis (Ukrainian: Кривоніс) or Kryvonos (Ukrainian: Кривонос) is a Ukrainian surname. Notable people with the surname include:

- Maksym Kryvonis (d. 1648), Ukrainian Cossack leader
- Nikita Kryvonos (born 1986), American tennis player
