= Vouk =

Vouk is a surname. Notable people with the surname include:

- Erika Vouk (born 1941), Slovenian poet and translator
- Rudi Vouk (born 1965), Austrian lawyer and politician

== See also ==
- Wouk
- Volk
