= Vernydub =

Vernydub (Ukrainian: Вернидуб) is a Ukrainian surname. Notable people with the surname include:

- Vitaliy Vernydub (born 1987), Ukrainian footballer, son of Yuriy
- Yuriy Vernydub (born 1966), Ukrainian footballer and manager
