= Bandarenka =

Bandarenka (Belarusian: Бандарэнка) is a gender-neutral Belarusian-language form of the Ukrainian surname Bondarenko (from Ukrainian: бондар, cooper). The surname may refer to:

- Artsem Bandarenka (born 1991), Belarusian triple jumper
- Natallia Bandarenka (born 1978), Belarusian sprint canoeist
- Raman Bandarenka, Belarusian designer murdered by police during the 2020 protests
- Vitali Bandarenka (born 1985), Belarusian boxer

== See also ==
- Bondarenko
