= Chornovil =

Chornovil or Chornovol (Ukrainian: Чорновіл, Чорновол) is a Ukrainian surname. Notable people with the surname include:

- Andriy Chornovil (born 1962), Ukrainian politician
- Taras Chornovil (born 1964), Ukrainian politician
- Tetiana Chornovol (born 1979), Ukrainian journalist and civic activist
- Viacheslav Chornovil (1937–1999), Ukrainian politician
