= Zinchenko =

Zinchenko ot Zintchenko (Ukrainian: Зінченко, Russian: Зинченко) is a Russian and Ukrainian surname. Notable people with the surname include:

- Anatoli Zinchenko (born 1949), Soviet-Russian footballer and coach
- Andrei Zintchenko (born 1972), Russian cyclist
- David Zinczenko (born 1969), American magazine editor
- Fedor Zinchenko (1902–1991), Soviet-Ukrainian military officer
- Natalya Zinchenko (born 1979), Ukrainian footballer and manager
- Pyotr Zinchenko (1903–1969), Soviet-Ukrainian psychologist
- Oleksandr Zinchenko (1957–2010), Ukrainian politician
- Oleksandr Zinchenko (born 1996), Ukrainian footballer
- Vladimir Zinchenko (born 1959), Ukrainian discus thrower
