= Ivanyuk =

Ivanyuk or Ivaniuk (Ukrainian: Іванюк) is a gender-neutral Ukrainian surname. Notable people with the surname include:

- Dmitry Ivanyuk (1900–1941), Soviet Army colonel
- Ilya Ivanyuk (born 1993), Russian high jumper
- Maryna Ivaniuk (born 1990), Ukrainian racing cyclist
- Nikolai Ivaniuk (born 1997), Ukrainian Patron
