= Stefaniuk =

Stefaniuk is a Ukrainian surname. Notable people with the surname include:

- Andrew Ernest Stefaniuk (born 1963), IT Manager JDB Group
- Franciszek Stefaniuk (born 1944), politician
- Rob Stefaniuk (born 1971), Canadian comedian, actor, and writer
- Zenon Stefaniuk (1930–1985), boxer
