= Dotsenko =

Dotsenko (Ukrainian: Доценко) is a gender-neutral Ukrainian surname. It may refer to the following notable people:

- Anastasia Dotsenko (born 1986), Russian cross-country skier
- Igor Dotsenko (1953–2014), Ukrainian-Russian musician
- Ihor Dotsenko (born 1974), Ukrainian-American footballer
- Maria Dotsenko (born 1967), Ukrainian diplomat
- Rostyslav Dotsenko (1931–2012), Ukrainian translator and literary critic
- Sergei Dotsenko (1947–2006), Soviet football player and coach
- Serhiy Dotsenko (born 1979), Ukrainian boxer
- Vadim Dotsenko (born 1988), Belgian footballer
- Viktor Dotsenko, Russian author

== See also ==
- Datsenko
