= Kushnirenko =

Kushnirenko is a surname. Notable people with the surname include:

- Anatoliy Kushnirenko, Russian mathematician, a namesake of the Bernstein–Kushnirenko theorem in algebra
- Bohdan Kushnirenko
