= Romanyshyn =

Romanyshyn is a Ukrainian surname Russified as Romanishin. Notable people with the surname include:

- Oleh Romanyshyn, Ukrainian and Soviet chess player
- Serhiy Romanyshyn, Ukrainian footballer
- Vladymyr Romanyshyn, Ukrainian and Soviet rower
