= Palahniuk =

Palahniuk, Palaniuk, Palahnuk or Palahnyuk (Ukrainian: Палагнюк, pronounced [pɐlɐɦˈnʲuk]) is a Ukrainian surname, originally a matronymic from the given name Palazhka (Палажка). Notable people with the surname include:

- Brandon Palaniuk (born 1984), American professional angler
- Chuck Palahniuk (born 1962), American novelist and freelance journalist
- Ihor Palahnyuk (born 1966), Ukrainian army officer
- Sam Palahnuk (born 1961), American video game designer
- Vasyl Palahnyuk (born 1991), Ukrainian professional footballer
- Volodymyr Palahnyuk (1919–2006), known as Jack Palance, American film actor

== See also ==
- "Palahniuk's Laughter", 2005 single by Fightstar
