= Plaksa (surname) =

Plaksa is an East Slavic surname literally meaning "crybaby". Notable people with the surname include:

- Boris Plaksa, birth name of Boris Shchutsky (1870—1964), general of Russian Imperial Army, military commander of the Ukrainian State (1918), member of the Russian White Movement, writer
- Rodion Plaksa, (born 2002) is a Ukrainian footballer
- Mikhail Plaksa (1915-1944), Hero of the Soviet Union
