= Nikolai Bondarenko (politician, born 1958) =

Russian politician (born 1958)

- Николай Бондаренко

Deputy Chairman of the Legislative Assembly of Saint Petersburg
- Incumbent
- Assumed office 30 September 2026

Member of the Legislative Assembly of Saint Petersburg from the 12th district
- Incumbent
- Assumed office 29 September 2021

Personal details
- Born: Nikolai Leonidovich Bondarenko; 6 September 1958 (age 68) Leningrad, Russian SFSR, USSR
- Party: United Russia
- Education: SPSUACE
- Profession: Politician

Nikolai Leonidovich Bondarenko (Russian: Николай Леонидович Бондаренко; born 6 September 1958) is a Russian politician who currently serves as a member of the Legislative Assembly of Saint Petersburg since 29 September 2021. On 30 September 2026, he was elected deputy chairman of the Legislative Assembly.
