= Ann Alexandra Harbuz =

Canadian artist

- Born: Ann Alexandra Napastiuk; July 25, 1908; Winnipeg, Manitoba, Canada
- Died: April 29, 1989; North Battleford, Saskatchewan, Canada
- Known for: painting
- Style: folk art

Ann Harbuz (Napastiuk) (July 25, 1908 – April 29, 1989) was a Canadian artist. A self-taught artist, she is known for folk art painting depicting 20th-century Canadian Ukrainian prairie perspectives. She drew inspiration from her rural and Ukrainian origins in Western Canada, reflecting her very personal vision of the social life of her community, a vision which is a combination of memories, dreams and reality. While her art career began late in life, she produced more than 1000 paintings and painted objects.

Born in Winnipeg, Manitoba, Harbuz spent her childhood near Whitkow, Saskatchewan. Her parents were immigrants from Ukraine. and much of her adult life in the Saskatchewan communities of Richard and North Battleford, and Ponoka, Alberta. She died in North Battleford, Saskatchewan, aged 80.

== Career ==
Harbuz did not start painting until the late 1960s, when she saw the artworks of her North Battleford neighbour, Mike Peryewizniak. When she started painting, she was still busy with home and community life and she would often have to integrate her art-making into the daily activities of the home. Her works blur traditional distinctions between 'folk', 'vernacular', 'popular', and 'fine' art categories. Her artistic style shows little adherence to formal/technical considerations and focuses instead on content and subject matter.

She was commissioned to do a painting for the 1976 Montreal Olympics, which was presented a painting to Thomas Douglas. Her work is exhibited across Canada and collected in many collections including the Mendel Art Gallery (Saskatoon), The Saskatchewan Arts Board, and The Mackenzie Gallery (Regina).

Several of her works have been sold at auction, including NIKOA KOWALSKI'S FARM, which sold at Hodgins Art Auctions in fall 2006.

== Exhibitions ==
Solo Exhibitions

- 1983 - Art Centre, North Battleford
- 1982 - Art Placement, Saskatoon Southern Alberta Art Gallery, Lethbridge
- 1981 - Ukrainian Museum of Canada, Saskatoon
- 1978 - Art Centre, North Battleford
- 1975 - Art Centre, North Battleford

Group Exhibitions

- 1991 - Work, Weather and the Grid: Agriculture in Saskatchewan, Dunlop Art Gallery, Regina
- 1988 - Prairie Folk Artists, Dunlop Art Gallery, Regina
- 1983 - Saskatchewan Naive/Folk Artists, Le Marchand Gallery, Edmonton // Seven Saskatchewan Folk Artists, Mendel Art Gallery (toured provincially) // From the Heart: Folk Art in Canada, National Museum of Man, Ottawa (toured nationally)
- 1982 - Prairie Folk Art, University of Saskatchewan Library, Saskatoon (organised for a Canadian Library Association conference)
- 1981 - Saskatchewan Images and Objects by Ann and Mike Harbuz, Ukrainian Museum of Canada, Saskatoon
- 1980 - Canadian Folk Artists, Thomas Gallery, Winnipeg Rosemont Art Gallery, Regina & Susan Whitney Art Gallery, Regina
- 1979 - Ann Harbuz and Fred Moulding, Kesik Gallery, Regina // Ukrainian Themes: Four Folk Artists, Shoestring Gallery, Saskatoon (toured provincially)
- 1978 - Three Primitive Painters, Gallery One, Saskatoon & Don Callandar Gallery, Winnipeg // The Saskatchewan Arts Board Collections, Norman MacKenzie Art Gallery, Regina
- 1976 - Grassroots Saskatchewan, Norman MacKenzie Art Gallery, Regina (toured provincially) // The Grain Bin, Saskatchewan Art at the Olympics, Montreal (toured provincially)
- 1975 - Saskatchewan Primitives, Mendel Art Gallery, Saskatoon
- 1972 - Art Centre, North Battleford
