= Bakay =

Bakay (Бакай) is an Eastern European surname (sometimes transliterated as Bakaj or Bakai). Notable people with the surname include:

- Nick Bakay (born 1959), American actor, comedian, writer, producer, and sports commentator
- Mykola Bakay (1939–1998), Ukrainian singer, composer, author, and dissident
- Julia Bakay (born 1994), Keynote Artist & Visual Strategist, based in the UK & USA, specializing in Live Illustration and Graphic Recording at events & conferences

== See also ==
- Bakaj (Бакай)
