= Andrei Kravchenko =

Andrei Kravchenko may refer to:

- Andrey Kravchenko (general) (1899–1963), Soviet general
- Andrei Krauchanka (born 1986), Belarusian decathlete
- Andrei Ilyich Kravchenko (1912–1976), Soviet army officer and hero of the Soviet Union

== See also ==
- Andriy Kravchenko (born 1980), Ukrainian racecar driver
