= Olha Datsenko =

Ukrainian and Soviet actress (1903–1993)

Olha Andriivna Datsenko, stage name Lesya Datsenko (12 (25) January 1903 — 18 December 1993) was a Ukrainian theater actress.

== Early life and education ==
Olha Datsenko was born on 12 (25) January 1903 in the village of Shishaky (now Poltava region, Ukraine). Her father died when she was one year old. Her mother, a village teacher, raised her. While studying in Poltava at the Starytskyi private gymnasium, she successfully performed in amateur performances, first in episodic and later in leading roles.

Returning to Shishaky in 1919, Datsenko took private lessons from the professional actress Lidia Kvitka, who had a summer house in the village. With the help of local talents, Kvitka organized a drama group, in which Datsenko also took an active part. The imaginative performance of young Datsenko attracted the audience and distinguished her from other amateurs. She played roles as a dramatic ingénue in Kvitka's performances. These were: Sofia in Beztalannaya, Marusya in Two Brothers, Fedoska in Two Families, Odarka in Give your heart free... and others.

Since 1922, Datsenko studied at the Mykola Lysenko Kyiv Music and Drama Institute.

19-year-old Datsenko was noticed by famous Ukrainian film and theate director Les Kurbas, who conducted an actor education course. He saw her as a typical Ukrainian woman, and after a month of studying at the institute, Datsenko and four other students were enrolled in the Kurbas theater group "Berezil."

== Personal life ==
Datsenko lived with her first husband, the director of "Berezil", Borys Tiagno, for 8 years. In the last three years, he transferred to the Odesa Film Factory, and Datsenko did not want to leave the “Berezil” theater, so they divorced. Datsenko married for the second time the actor and director of "Berezil", Borys Drobynsky. In 1936, she gave birth to a daughter, Maryana. Soon, her second husband was arrested in Kyiv. At that moment, Datsenko temporarily lived in Shishaky village with her family, so she learned about the arrest belatedly from acquaintances. Dobrynsky was sentenced to 14 years without the right to correspond. However, already on 29 August 1937, he was killed in Kyiv.

== Career ==
- 1925-1935 — "Berezil" theater.
- 1937-1938 — Zhytomyr Mobile Russian Drama Theater.
- 1938-1940 — Yenakievsky Russian Drama Theater named after Alexander Pushkin.
- 1940-1941 — Mariupol Russian Drama Theater.
- 1945-1946 — Poltava Ukrainian Music and Drama Theater.
- 1946-1950 — Kamianets-Podilskyi Ukrainian Music and Drama Theater.
- 1952-1961 — The second mobile Russian drama theater of the Karelo-Finnish SSR.

== Roles ==
- A nun (Haidamaky by Taras Shevchenko).
- Ulya (Mina Mazailo by Mykola Kulish).
- Olya (People's Malachy by Mykola Kulish).
- Katria (Shoots by Ivan Mykytenko).
- Yum-Yum (The Mikado by Arthur Sullivan).
- Louise (Intrigue and Love by Friedrich Schiller).
