= Pavlychko =

Pavlychko (Ukrainian: Павличко) is a Ukrainian surname. Notable persons with that name include:

- Dmytro Pavlychko (1929–2023), Ukrainian poet, translator, scriptwriter, and culturologist
- Solomiia Pavlychko (1958–1999), Ukrainian literary critic, philosopher, and translator
