= Gizella Bodnár =

Hungarian burglar

- Born: 18 October 1926; Miskolc, Hungary
- Died: 6 February 2019 (aged 92); Budapest, Hungary
- Other names: Repülős Gizi
- Criminal charge: Burglary
- Criminal penalty: A total of 40 years in prison (16 years and 7 months served)

Gizella Bodnár (18 October 1926 – 6 February 2019) known as Repülős Gizi (“Airplane Gizi”) was a Hungarian burglar, who became known in the early 1950s. According to the media, she was infamous for using the then-frequent domestic flights to travel to different cities, break into houses there, then fly home, avoiding suspicion, since police would not suspect someone living that far away from the crime scene.

== Life ==
She was the fourth of six children of a railroad engineer father and a housewife mother. She began to steal smaller things while still a child; she attributed her kleptomania to meningitis she survived at the age of six. Later she studied in Kassa, when World War II broke out; it was stress that was said to have brought out her kleptomania again.

In the early 1950s, when Malév, the national airline company used to provide domestic flights between cities in Hungary, Bodnár often flew from Budapest to Miskolc, Debrecen, Szeged, Pécs and Szombathely, broke into houses, then flew back to the capital with the evening flight; although she herself always denied ever flying in a plane. She also committed break-ins abroad, in Amsterdam, London and Paris. Part of her modus operandi was to go to a neighbour in the morning and borrow some condiments for cooking, which she would return in the evening, providing herself an alibi for two distinct parts of a day in a different town.

She was arrested twenty-one times between 1948 and 2006, stood trial over 20 times and was convicted to a total of 40 years in prison. She spent a total of 16 years and 7 months in prison. Later she moved to the town of Komárom, where she was arrested in January 2009, at the age of 82, for breaking into a house. Late in her life, she was diagnosed with kleptomania: she admitted liking "shiny things" and claimed that she mostly gave away her loot to other people instead of selling it, a claim supported by the fact that at the time of her death she had no possessions to her name.

She published her memoirs in 2007, with the title Repülős Gizi – A tolvajok királynője (“Airplane Gizi, Queen of Thieves”). She was arrested twice in Hungary in 2015, in June and September; in the latter instance, she was found in a cupboard, where she claimed she hid from the rain outside. She was arrested in February 2016 in Sukoró, then in August 2017 in Tatabánya.

Bodnár died on 6 February 2019, aged 92.
