= Vovk =

Vovk is a surname of Ukrainian origin that means wolf. It currently predominates among East and South Slavs in Ukraine, Belarus, Slovenia, and Croatia. Notable people with the surname include:

- Aleš Vovk, member of Slovene duo Maraaya
- Andrey Vovk (born 1991), Ukrainian chess player
- Andriy Vovk, Ukrainian defence minister
- Angelina Vovk (born 1942) presenter for the Soviet Central Television
- Anton Vovk (1900–1963), Slovenian Roman Catholic archbishop
- Fedir Vovk (1847–1918), Ukrainian anthropologist, archaeologist and museum curator
- Frančiška Vovk (1860–1932), Slovenian poet and lyricist
- Marjetka Vovk, member of Slovene duo Maraaya
- Melita Vovk (1928–2020), Slovenian painter and illustrator
- Vira Vovk (1926–2022), Ukrainian-born Brazilian writer, critic and translator
- Yuri Vovk (born 1988), Ukrainian chess player

== See also ==
- Vovk (river), a tributary of the Southern Bug in Ukraine
- Wowk (disambiguation)
