= Oleksandr Bondarenko =

Oleksandr Bondarenko (Russian-language variant: Aleksandr Bondarenko) may refer to:

- Oleksandr Bondarenko (actor), Ukrainian actor
- Oleksandr Bondarenko (footballer, 1966), Ukrainian footballer from Zaporizhzhia
- Oleksandr Bondarenko (footballer, 1989), Ukrainian footballer from Kyiv
- Oleksandr Bondarenko (economist) (born 1987), Ukrainian economist, businessman, and politician
- Aleksandr Bondarenko (footballer, 1954), Soviet-Kyrgyzstani footballer from Bishkek
