= Mykhailiuk =

Mykhailiuk (Михайлюк) is a Ukrainian patronymic surname derived from Mykhailo, Michael. Transliteration variants: Mykhailyuk, Mykhailuk, etc. Russian equivalent: Mikhailyuk.

- Halyna Mykhailiuk (born 1987), Ukrainian lawyer and politician
- Mykhailo Mykhailyuk (born 1940), Romanian poet, novelist, and literary critic
- Sviatoslav Mykhailiuk (born 1997), Ukrainian basketball player

== See also ==
- Mihailuk

Михайлюк
