= Bondar =

Bondar (Cyrillic: Бондар, Бондарь), also Bondár and Bondars, is a common surname of East Slavic origin meaning "cooper" (barrel maker). Notable people with the surname include:

- Aleksandr Bondar (diver) (born 1993), Ukrainian-Russian diver
- Aleksandr Bondar (footballer) (born 1967), Russian footballer
- Alexandre Bondar (born 1972), Russian writer
- Alla Bondar (1921–1981), Soviet-Ukrainian politician
- Andriy Bondar (born 1974), Ukrainian poet and translator
- Anna Bondár (born 1997), Hungarian tennis player
- Carin Bondar (born 1975), Canadian biologist
- Dani Bondar (born 1987), Israeli footballer
- Elena Bondar (born 1958), Romanian rower
- Georgy Bondar (1893–1939), Soviet corps commander
- Gregório Bondar (1881–1959), Brazilian entomologist
- Hanna Bondar (born 1975), Ukrainian architect and politician
- Iana Bondar (born 1991), Ukrainian biathlete
- Mārtiņš Bondars (born 1971), Latvian politician
- Mykhailo Bondar (born 1973), Ukrainian politician
- Nikolay Bondar (born 1950), Russian judge
- Oana Bondar (born 1983), Romanian handballer
- Oleksandr Bondar (born 1955), Ukrainian politician
- Oleksandr Bondar (futsal player) (born 1981), Ukrainian futsal player
- Roberta Bondar (born 1945), Canadian astronaut
- Sergei Bondar (born 1963), Russian footballer and coach
- Valeriy Bondar (born 1999), Ukrainian footballer
- Vladyslav Bondar (born 2000), Ukrainian footballer
- Volodymyr Bondar (born 1968), Ukrainian politician
- Viktor Bondar (born 1975), Ukrainian politician
- Viktoriya Bondar (born 1995), Ukrainian cyclist
- Yuri Bondar (born 1973), Belarusian politician
