= Shukhevych =

Shukhevych or Shukhevich (Ukrainian or Russian: Шухевич, Belarusian: Шухевiч) is a gender-neutral East Slavic surname. Notable people with this surname include:

- Roman Shukhevych (1907–1950), Ukrainian politician and military leader
- Stepan Shukhevych (1877–1945), Ukrainian lawyer and military figure
- Volodymyr Shukhevych (1849–1915), Ukrainian writer, ethnographer and teacher
- Yuriy Shukhevych (born 1933), Ukrainian politician
