= Ivan Dancha =

Ukrainian boxer and coach

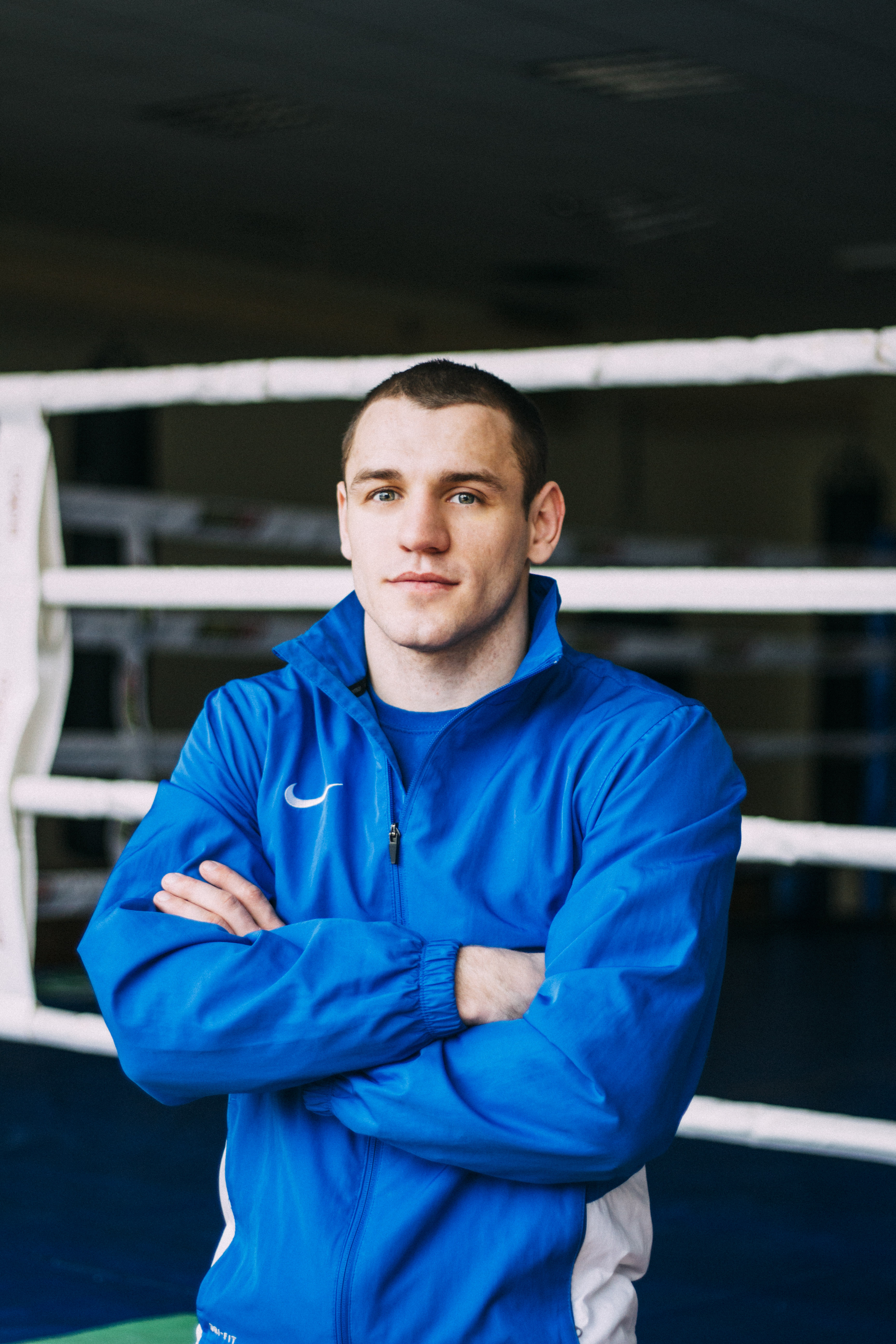

Personal information
- Nationality: Ukrainian
- Height: 174 cm (5 ft 9 in)
- Weight: Super-middleweight

Boxing career

Boxing record
- Total fights: 1
- Wins: 1

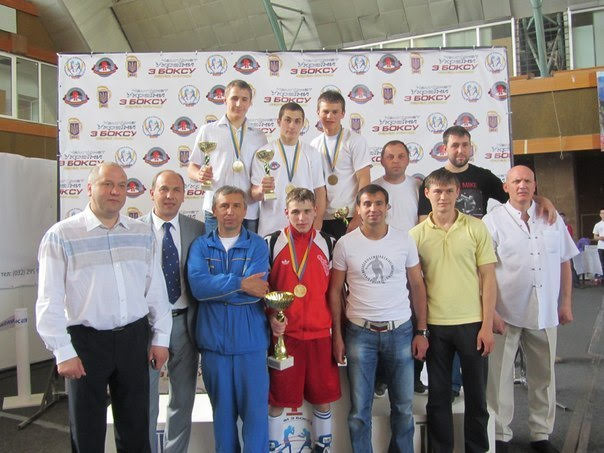
Youth Boxing Championship of Ukraine 2012 (Lviv): Ivan Dancha (1st place), coaches: Honored Coach of Ukraine Ivan Pavlovych Khomiak, Master of Sports Viktor Serhiiovych Antipov, Master of Sports Stepan Andriiovych Makohin.

Ivan Dancha is a Ukrainian boxer and coach. He won a gold medal at the 2015 Ukrainian national championships.

== Professional career ==
He made his professional debut on 30 July 2021, winning via first-round technical knockout.

== Sport achievements boxing ==
=== Regional Amateur Championships of Ukraine ===
2017 – Bronze medal – Bronze medalist of Ukraine Lviv (up to 64 kg)

2016 – Bronze medal – Bronze medalist of Ukraine Kharkiv (up to 64 kg)

2015 – Gold medal – Champion of Ukraine Vinnytsia (up to 64 kg)

2014 – Silver medal – Silver medalist of Ukraine under 22 Vinnytsia (up to 64 kg)

2012 – Gold medal – Champion of Ukraine among youth Lviv (up to 64 kg)

=== Regional Amateur Cups of Ukraine ===
2017 – Bronze medal – Bronze medalist of the Ukrainian Cup in boxing Mariupol in weight (up to 69 kg)

2015 – Silver medal – Silver medalist of the Cup of Ukraine in boxing Mykolaiv in weight (up to 64 kg)

=== International competitions ===
2019 – Gold medal – International Tournament "LVIV Boxing Cup" class "A" among Elite Men in weight (up to 69 kg)

2018 – Silver medal – Strandja 2018 class "A" in weight (up to 64 kg)

2018 – Bronze medal – LVIV Boxing Cup 2018 [70] in weight (up to 69 kg)

2012 – Silver medal – The 26th International Boxing Tournament in memory of Valery Arsenov (up to 60 kg) was held

2011 – Gold medal – 15th International Youth Tournament in Memory of Honored Coach of Ukraine Andreev

== Victories over famous and titled athletes ==
Berinchyk Denis Silver medalist of the 2012 Olympic Games, silver medalist of the 2011 World Championships, two-time champion of Ukraine 2013, 2014. Ukrainian Armed Forces – Cup of Ukraine 2015 Mykolaiv.

Golovashchenko Taras Participant [Archived October 10, 2021 in Wayback Machine.] World Series Boxing (WSB Ukrainian Atamans 2015, Champion of Ukraine 2014) – All-Ukrainian Boxing Tournament Kryvyi Rih 2019 Day 3.

Kislitsyn Vyacheslav Master of Sports of Ukraine of international class member of WSB Ukrainian Atamans, champion of Ukraine in boxing 2012-Cup of Ukraine in boxing 2014.

Hovhannisyan Mger World Boxing Champion among students. Champion of Ukraine 2016 2017 MSMK, World Series Boxing WSB Ukrainian Atamans 2013-2014 up to 64 kg Ukrainian Championship Vinnytsia 2015.

Pisotsky Denis MSMK silver medalist of the European Youth Boxing Championship 2014 – Lviv Boxing Cup 2018

Johnson Delante USA Champion 2016 AIBA Youth World Boxing Championships – Strandja 2018 class «A».

Madoyan Gurgen Участник European Games is continuing in Minsk 2019 – International Tournament «LVIV Boxing Cup» class «А» among Elite Men 2019.

== Sports lectures ==
He was invited by students of the Ukrainian Leadership Academy UAL Lviv, November 30, 2019, to "HEALTHday" as a boxing lecturer – Ivan Dancha, What is the path to success in professional sports and to national recognition? How do you risk neglecting to take care of your health? Does it take unrealistic effort to harden your body

On June 1, 2021, Ivan Dancha and Nazar Kurotchyn attended the OlympicLab event together with the Champions Chat and Leadership Skills module. Athletes conducted a master class in boxing for children, showed various important techniques in this sport, told about the features that characterize boxing. Each participant was also presented with gifts from the NOC of Ukraine Branch in the Lviv Region and the Library-Branch No. 10 CBS for Children of the City of Lviv.

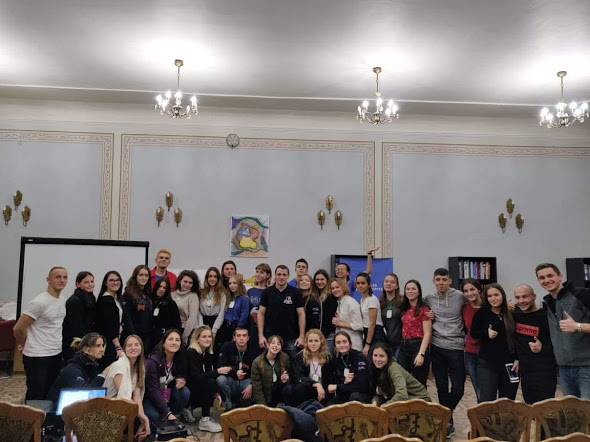
Photos from the lecture at HEALTH day, students of the Ukrainian Leadership Academy and lecturer Ivan Dancha
