= Vadim Dotsenko =

Belgian association football player

Personal information
- Date of birth: 3 June 1988 (age 38)
- Place of birth: Bishkek, Kyrgyzstan SSR
- Height: 1.86 m (6 ft 1 in)
- Position: Forward

Youth career
- Roeselare

Senior career*
Years	Team	Apps	(Gls)
2009-2011	Roeselare	36	(3)
2010	→ KVK Ieper (loan)		
2011-2012	KVK Ieper		
	Coxyde	15+	(2+)
- * Club domestic league appearances and goals

Vadim Dotsenko (Russian: Вадим Доценко; born 3 June 1988) is a Belgian former footballer who is last known to have played as a forward for Coxyde.

== Career ==
Dotsenko started his career with Belgian top flight side Roeselare.

Before the second half of 2010/11, he was sent on loan to Willebroek in the Belgian lower leagues.

In 2011, Dotsenko signed for Belgian lower league club KVK Ieper, before joining Coxyde in the Belgian fourth division due to injury.
