= Marushchak =

Marushchak (Russian: Марущак, Ukrainian: Марущак) is a surname of Ukrainian origin. Notable people with this surname include:

- Alina Marushchak (born 1997), Ukrainian weightlifter
- Dmitry Marushchak (born 1980), Russian freestyle skier
- Ivan Marushchak (born 1970), Ukrainian football coach
- Kirill Marushchak (born 1986) Russian footballer
- Maryan Marushchak (born 1979) Ukrainian footballer
