= Alexandre Bondar =

Russian writer (born 1972)

Alexandre Bondar (Russian: Александр Бондарь; born 21 September 1972) is a Russian writer and novelist, "literary remake" genre founder.

He was born in Krasnodar, Russia, in 1972. He studied at Kuban State University in the Department of Journalism and also at Moscow Humanitarian University in the Department of Russian Language and Literature. Between 1995 and 2007 he lived in Canada and attended courses in Russian Literature at the University of Toronto. Between the years 1991-1995 he worked as a press reporter in Krasnodar and Sochi and was the editor of a Krasnodar newspaper in Tuapse. Alexandre Bondar's prose has been published in numerous Russian-language magazines and newspapers in Canada, the United States and Russia, and in several books published in Moscow and Montreal, including critically acclaimed "Nochnoj Kabak. (Povesti i rasskazy)" ("Night Restaurant. Selected novels and short stories" ("Klenovye Listja", Montreal)). Alexandre Bondar is a member of the North American Writers' Union. In 2007 he returned in Russia. Now he lives in Moscow.

== Selected works ==
=== Novels ===
- The Gigolo (1999)
- The Year of Black Monkey (2003)
- The Cat Girl has Nine Lives (2005)
- While Black Moon (2003)
- The Drummer Girl (2003)
- The Evening Bluz (1999)
- Downtown (1997)
- The Town I See in My Dream (2003)
- The Toy (2002)
- Ivan Tsarevich and Vasilisa Prekrasnaja (1994)
- The Night Restaurant (2003)
- The Cross of the Iron (2004)
- The Black Avengers (2004)
- On the Ruins of the Old Fortress (2004)
- Blood and Hate (2007)
- The Lights of the Night Highway (2001)
- The Passenger from the Tel-Aviv (2000)
- Dead Calm (1999)
- The Dreams of the Dead City (1997)
- The Mystery of the Red Cave (2007)
- Tanya (2004)
- The Last Street Car (1999)
- The Animal (2004)

=== Short stories ===
- Alyonka (2007)
- The Tale about Anna-Francheska (2004)
- The Refugee (2002)
- The Bomb in the Elevator (2001)
- The Red Roses Bouquet (1999)
- The House on the Corner (2004)
- Two in the Train (1994)
- The Forum (1999)
- The Chochols in Torontschina (2002)
- Ivan Kryukov (2004)
- The Cook (2002)
- «Good Night, Children!» in Toronto (2002)
- Masha (2004)
- Masha and the Bolsheviks (2004)
- One More Moment of the Spring (1989)
- Natasha (2004)
- Olesya (2004)
- The Autumn (1991)
- The Parcel (2007)
- Lyonka Panteleev (2004)
- The Bullets (2007)
- The Happy Letter (2002)
- The Interview with the Poet (2003)
- The Human Rights Fighter (2002)
- The Conversation with the Preacher (2002)
- Russian Rock in Toronto (2002)
- The Manuscript that was Found under the Bed (1989)
- The Sexopathologist (2002)
- The Tanechka, The Policaj Granddaughter (2004)
- The Journalism in Toronto (2003)
- The Wind in The Chechen Mountains (2007)
- The Returning (2003)
- The Remembrance Day (2007)
- Jane and Finch (2007)
- Thai Cuisine (2007)
- On the Funeral (2007)
- The Outside Trip (2007)
- The Verdict (2007)
- The Patriot School (2007)
