= Wouk =

Wouk is a surname. Notable people with the surname include:

- Herman Wouk (1915–2019), American writer
- Victor Wouk (1919–2005), American scientist and pioneer in the development of electric and hybrid vehicles, brother of Herman

== See also ==
- Vouk
