= Art Kolisnyk =

Canadian football player (1921–1996)

Profile
- Positions: G, T

Personal information
- Born: August 17, 1921; Winnipeg, Manitoba, Canada
- Died: December 10, 1996 (aged 75); Sidney, British Columbia, Canada
- Listed weight: 185 lb (84 kg)

Career information
- University: Manitoba

Career history
- 1940–1941: Winnipeg Blue Bombers
- 1945–1946: Winnipeg Blue Bombers
- 1948: Regina Roughriders

Awards and highlights
- Grey Cup champion (1941)

Arthur Boris Kolisnyk (August 17, 1921 – December 10, 1996) was a Canadian professional football player who played for the Winnipeg Blue Bombers and Regina Roughriders. He won the Grey Cup with Winnipeg in 1941.

== Personal life ==
He had a wife named Gladys and four daughters.
