= Hohol =

Hohol (Ukrainian: Гоголь) is a Ukrainian surname. Notable people with the surname include:

- Bert Hohol, (1922–2017), provincial level politician from Alberta, Canada
- Mykola Hohol, or Nikolai Gogol, Ukrainian writer
- Iona Hohol, or Jonah Gogol (died in 1602), Orthodox and later an Uniate bishop of Pinsk-Turowski

== See also ==
- Khokhol
