= Marusiak =

Marušiak (Slovak feminine: Marušiaková) and Marusiak are surnames which may refer to:

- Juraj Marušiak (born 1970), Slovak political scientist
- Marek Marušiak (born 1990), Slovak ice hockey player
- Yevhen Marusiak (born 2000), Ukrainian ski jumper
- Wojciech Marusiak (born 1982), Polish cloud architect, Customer Engineer at Google, and author of Google Cloud Associate Cloud Engineer Certification and Implementation Guide
