= Kolesnik =

Kolesnik, Kolesnyk, Kolisnyk, or Kalesnik is a gender-neutral occupational surname meaning "wheelwright" in several Slavic languages. In its various forms, it is particularly common in Ukraine.

== Variations ==
- Ukraine: Колесник or Колісник (Kolesnyk, Kolisnyk; less common: Kolesnik, Kolisnik)
- Belarus: Калеснік (Kalesnik)
- Russia: Колесник (Kolesnik)
- Poland: Koleśnik
- Moldova/Romania: Colesnic
- Other: Kolesnick

== People ==
=== Kolesnik ===
- Alyona Kolesnik (born 1995), Ukrainian-Azerbaijani freestyle wrestler
- Andrey Kolesnik (born 1960), Russian politician
- Magdalena Koleśnik (born 1990), Polish actress
- Vadim Kolesnik (born 1969), Ukrainian hammer thrower
- Vadym Kolesnik (born 2001), Ukrainian-born ice dancer
- Vitali Kolesnik (born 1979), Kazakhstani ice hockey goaltender

=== Kolesnyk ===
- Danylo Kolesnyk (born 2001), Ukrainian footballer
- Vadym Kolesnyk (born 1967), Ukrainian footballer
- Yuliia Kolesnyk (born 1997), Ukrainian sprint canoeist

=== Kolisnyk ===
- Art Kolisnyk (1921–1996), Canadian football player
- Mykola Kolisnyk (born 1988), Ukrainian statesman

=== Kalesnik ===
- Sergey Kalesnik (born 1970), Belarusian sprint canoeist
- Stanislav Kalesnik (1901–1977), Soviet glaciologist
