= Boyka =

Boyka may refer to:

- Mia Boyka (born 1997), Russian singer
- Boyka: Undisputed, 2017 film
- Yuri Boyka, a character in the Undisputed film series.
