= Bakaj =

Bakaj is surname. Notable people with the surname include:

- Elis Bakaj, Albanian footballer
- Edvan Bakaj, Albanian footballer
- Andrew P. Bakaj, American attorney and former intelligence officer

== See also ==
- Bakai
- Bakay
