= Andriy Honchar =

Ukrainian footballer

Personal information
- Full name: Andriy Vasylyovych Honchar
- Date of birth: 15 March 1985 (age 41)
- Position: Defender

Youth career
- 1998–2002: Piddubny Olympic College

Senior career*
Years	Team	Apps	(Gls)
2003–2006	Dnepr Mogilev	53	(0)
2007	KajHa	10	(1)
2008–2011	Dnepr Mogilev	96	(1)
- * Club domestic league appearances and goals

Andriy Honchar (Ukrainian: Андрій Васильович Гончар; born 15 March 1985) is a retired Ukrainian professional footballer. He spent most of his career playing for Dnepr Mogilev in Belarus.
