= Mykola Bakay =

Mykola Bakay Микола Бакай
- Born: March 2, 1931; Vynohrad, Stanisławów Voivodeship, Second Polish Republic
- Died: July 28, 1998 (aged 67) Chernivtsi, Ukraine
- Genres: Folk, pop
- Occupations: Singer, composer, poet, author
- Instrument: Singing
- Years active: 1976–1998
- Formerly of: Bukovina Ensemble of Song and Dance

Mykola Petrovych Bakay (Note: Ukrainian: Микола Петрович Бакай, romanized: Mykola Petrovych Bakai) (2 March 1931 – 28 July 1998) was a Ukrainian singer, composer, poet, author and Soviet dissident.

== Biography ==
Bakay was born in the village of Vynohrad, in the Pokuttia region, which was at that time under Polish rule. Due to the outbreak of World War II he was only able to finish seventh class. In 1947, Bakay together with his family was deported to Siberia. He attempted to escape twice, but was not able to succeed. As punishment he was forcefully settled to work at the logging sites and factories near Omsk. There he studied at the local music school of Vissarion Shebalin and later worked as an actor at the Omsk Theater of Operetta.

Bakay returned from the forced settlement in 1960. He moved to Chernivtsi, where he began singing in the Bukovina ensemble of song and dance. He worked together with many of the performers from the ensemble, but especially with the singer and composer Pavlo Dvorsky. They wrote many songs together, Bakay writing the lyrics and Dvorsky writing the music.

Mykola Bakay was buried in his native village of Vynohrad.

== Legacy ==
The house of culture in Vynohrad has a theme exhibition that is dedicated to the poet-singer Mykola Bakay. Not far from the building and near the Taras Shevchenko monument the first local festival of the Ukrainian song Smerykova khata took place in 2009 on the day of Illia (Sunday). It was dedicated to the memory of Bakay and his works. The festival opened under the sound of trembitas and a dance performed by the National amateur ensemble of song and dance "Prykarpattia" from the village of Otynia.
