= Volodymyr Harbuz =

Ukrainian painter and graphic artist (born 1951)

Harbuz, Volodymyr
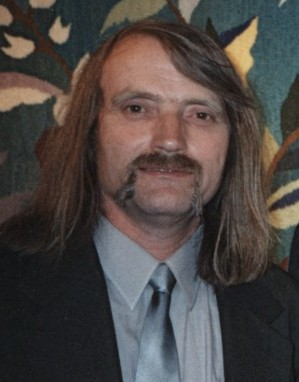
- Volodymyr Harbuz
- Born: December 21, 1951; Ukrainian Soviet Socialist Republic
- Known for: Ukrainian post-impressionist painter
- Awards: Nominee of the Shevchenko National Prize

Volodymyr Harbuz (Ukrainian: Володимир Васильович Гарбуз, Russian: Владимир Васильевич Гарбуз; b. 21 December 1951 in Karapyshi, Kiev Oblast, Ukrainian SSR) is a Ukrainian painter and graphic artist He is a member of the National Union of Artists of Ukraine since 1988, and repeated nominee of the Shevchenko National Prize.

His pictorial and graphic works are represented and have been exhibited in many Ukrainian and foreign museums (Australia, Canada, Poland, Slovakia), as well as in private collections. His works have been compared with Mykola Hlushchenko.

== Biography ==
Volodymyr Harbuz was born December 21, 1951, in the village Karapyshi Myronivsky, in the Kiev region. His father was a foreman and tractor driver, and his mother worked on a collective farm which cultivated beets. After 8th grade young Harbuz studied courses in tractor driving and maintenance.

In 1969 he entered the Kiev Art building vocational school No. 5. In 1971 he went to the army. He served in Moscow in the Soviet special forces. He worked as a designer in the company Kievotdelstroy from 1972 to 1979.

In the period from 1979 to 1990 he worked at the Kiev "Artist" studio factory of monumental and decorative art. Since then - for creative work. Since 1986, Republican Party of art exhibitions.

In 1987 he graduated from the department of book art Ukrainian Polygraphic Institute Fedorova in Lviv (teacher - F. Gluschuk).

== Art ==
Volodymyr Garbuz's genre is diverse and technically multifaceted. He works in portrait and easel charts, easel painting and monumental art. His works are characterized by the synthesis of pagan traditions and spiritual heritage of the legendary pre-history period of Ukraine and its Christian culture. This characterization is especially clearly seen in the genre of landscape, e g. the cycle Nearby Dnieper, which is not a landscape in the traditional sense but a symphony of expression and color.

The artist has repeatedly said that the Ukrainian poet Taras Shevchenko is an important subject matter of his life, and this claim is reflected in works relating to Shevchenko and his poems, including the oil compositions: "Catherine", "Reburial genius", as well as many book illustrations.

=== Book illustrations ===
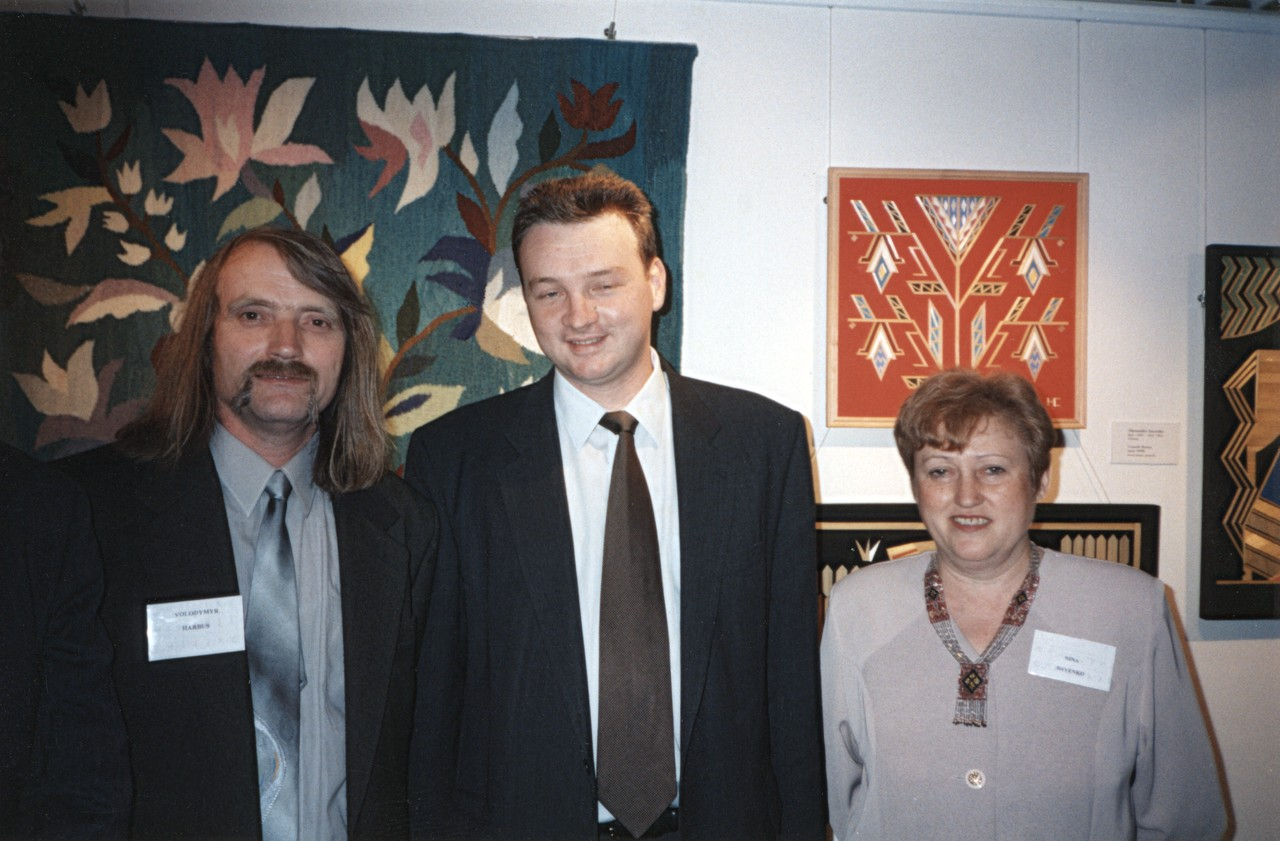
Visiting artists from Ukraine — Volodymyr Harbuz (left) and Nina Sayenko (right) together with Australian politician David Borger (center) at an art exhibition organised by the Ukrainian Artists Society of Australia at the Parramatta Heritage Centre gallery in April 2000.

Volodymyr Harbuz has illustrated books relating to Taras Shevchenko, including the Kobzar, "Shevchenko and Eternity," "The path to the stars" and "Psalms of David".

Other publications illustrated by the artist include: "Statement of Old Slavic legends or mythology" J. Hlovatskiy, "The Ukrainian people in their legends, religious views and beliefs" Bulasheva G., "Three Sisters" O. Storozhenko, a collection of Ukrainian folk tales "Devil's Mill", "Arise Ukraine!" and many others.
