= Horobets =

Horobets (Ukrainian: Горобець), also transliterated Gorobets, is a surname meaning "sparrow" in Ukrainian. Notable people with the surname include:

- Alina Horobets (born 1985), Ukrainian futsal coach and former futsal player
- Oleksandr Horobets, Ukrainian politician
- Ruslan Gorobets (1956–2014), Ukrainian-Russian musician
- Yuri Gorobets (1932–2022), Russian actor
- Vita Horobets (born 1996), Ukrainian basketball player

== See also ==
- Horobetsu Station, a station in Horobetsu, Noboribetsu, Hokkaido, Japan
