= Petro Olenych =

- Born: Ochakiv
- Citizenship: Ukraine
- Known for: Chief Digital Transformation Officer of Kyiv (CDTO)

Petro Serhiiovych Olenych (born July 27, 1982, Ochakiv, Mykolaiv Oblast, Ukrainian SSR) is the Chief Digital Transformation Officer of Kyiv (CDTO) and former Deputy Head of the Kyiv City State Administration for exercising self-governing powers in the field of digitalization.

== Biography ==
Petro Olenych was born on July 27, 1982, in the city of Ochakiv, Mykolaiv Oblast.

In 2004, he graduated from Kyiv National University of Culture and Arts with a degree in Law and received the qualification of "Lawyer". The same year, he began his career as a leading, and later chief, specialist in the IT Department of the Ministry of Justice of Ukraine.

From August 2005, he worked as a chief specialist in the Constitutional Law Department of the Ministry of Justice.

During 2008, Petro Olenych worked as a manager in the Residential Real Estate Department of the company “KDD Group N.V.”

In 2009, he was appointed Deputy Head of the Kyiv Regional Branch of the State Enterprise “Center of State Land Cadastre”.

From September 2012 to February 2017, he served as Head of the Main Department of the State Service of Ukraine for Geodesy, Cartography and Cadastre in Sumy Oblast.

From March 2017 to June 2018, Petro Olenych was appointed First Deputy Director of the Department of Information and Communication Technologies of the executive body of the Kyiv City Council (Kyiv City State Administration).

In July 2018, Petro Olenych served as Director of the Registration Department of the executive body of the Kyiv City Council. From July 27 of the same year, he was appointed Director of the Land Resources Department of the executive body of the Kyiv City Council.

Since April 2, 2021, he has been Deputy Head of the Kyiv City State Administration for exercising self-governing powers in the field of digital development, digital transformations, and digitalization (CDTO). In one of his first interviews in the position, Olenych stated that the main goals of his activity were the implementation of electronic democracy and a digital ecosystem for city governance.

== Investigation ==
=== Allegations of Land Plot Corruption ===
According to the Specialized Anti-Corruption Prosecutor's Office (SAPO), from 2019 to February 2025, a criminal organization operated in Kyiv, consisting of former and current officials of the Kyiv City Council and Kyiv City State Administration (KCSA). According to the investigation, a corruption scheme in the Kyiv City Council may have allowed officials to illegally seize land worth ₴11.6 million. According to NABU, members of the organization identified promising land plots and registered ownership of buildings—nonexistent ones—on these plots under the names of affiliated individuals. They then submitted applications to the City Council requesting ownership of the land, explaining this by the alleged need to maintain the “buildings”.

The main figures in the case were former Kyiv City Council deputy Denys Komarnytskyi (the organizer), Deputy Head of the KCSA Petro Olenych, Kyiv City Council deputies, including the head of the land relations committee Mykhailo Terentiev and committee member Olena Marchenko. Olenych is suspected by SAPO of participating in a criminal organization. On February 7, 2025, Olenych was arrested with bail set at ₴15 million. On February 21, Olenych was released from pre-trial detention on bail. On February 26, Olenych was suspended from his position for 2 months. On February 28, Vitali Klitschko dismissed his deputy Olenych and two other officials.
