= Joseph Bondarenko =

Ukrainian evangelical theologian

Joseph (Iosef) Bondarenko (born December 15, 1936) is a Ukrainian evangelical minister, author, theologian, public speaker and founder of Good Call Ministries, based out of Orange County, California. Bondarenko currently resides in Santa Barbara, California. A notable Soviet dissident, in 1962 Bondarenko's diploma was withheld and he was expelled as a young man from Odesa Institute of Marine Fleet Engineers (currently Odesa National Maritime University) for illegally engaging in religious activities in the Soviet Union. Undeterred by this expulsion, Bondarenko's ongoing activities eventually led to multiple prison terms in both Odesa and Kyiv.
