= Bakai, Kėdainiai =

Bakai
- Former hamlet
- Location in Lithuania Bakai (Lithuania)
- Coordinates: 55°17′20″N 23°55′26″E
- Country: Lithuania
- County: Kaunas County
- Municipality: Kėdainiai district municipality
- Eldership: Kėdainiai City Eldership
- Time zone: UTC+2 (EET)
  - Summer (DST): UTC+3 (EEST)

Bakai (formerly Russian: Баки) was a hamlet, located in Kėdainiai district municipality, in Kaunas County, in central Lithuania. It was 3 km from Kėdainiai, among Varėnai, Tubiai, Janušava and Skirstynė (now Keleriškiai) villages.

== History ==
As for 1902 its population was 29, as for 1923 – 38.

On 27 October 1971 Bakai hamlet was liquidated.

== Demography ==
Historical population
Year	Pop.	±% p.a.
1902	29	—
1923	38	+1.30%
Source: 1902, 1923
