= Bondaruk =

Bondaruk (Ukrainian: Бондарук) is a Ukrainian gender-neutral patronymic surname literally meaning "son of barrel maker". Notable people with the surname include:

- Gennadi Bondaruk
- Roman Bondaruk
