= Kushniruk =

Kushniruk is a surname. Notable people with the surname include:

- Anton Kushniruk
- Zina Kushniruk
