= Alexander Kravchenko =

Alexander Kravchenko may refer to:

- Alexander Kravchenko, Russian revolutionary
- Alexander Kravchenko, Russian skier
- Alexander Kravchenko, Russian poker player
