= Malyuk (surname) =

Malyuk (Ukrainian: Малюк) is a gender-neutral Ukrainian surname. Colloquially, a daughter or a wife of a person with the surname Malyuk may be called Malyuchykha or Malyuchikha (Ukrainian: Малючиха). Notable people with the surname include:

- Vasyl Malyuk (born 1983), Ukrainian military officer
- Viktor Malyuk (1961–2004), Russian serial killer
