= Kolesnichenko =

Kolesnichenko, Kolesnychenko, Kolisnychenko, or Kolisnichenko (Ukrainian: Колесниченко, Колесніченко, Колісниченко, Колісніченко) is a surname. Notable people with the surname include:

- Alexandra Kolesnichenko (born 1992), Uzbekistani tennis player
- Kirill Kolesnichenko (born 2000), Russian footballer
- Olena Kolesnichenko (born 1993), Ukrainian hurdler
- Svetlana Kolesnichenko (born 1993), Russian synchronized swimmer
- Vladimirs Koļesņičenko (born 1980), Latvian footballer
