= Abba Kompaneyets =

Jewish theatre personnel

Abba Kompaneyets (Абе or Аба Гирш-Лейбович Компанеец; 1870–1946) was a Yiddish theatre troupe manager and actor in Russia, Latvia and Poland.

His wife was the actress Leah (Леи Компанеец born Гершанович), his daughter the actress Betty Kompaneyets-Rabinovitsch (Бетти Компанеец-Рабинович) (1900–?) who emigrated with her husband Leon to Mexico where their daughters Fanya Rabel became a well-known painter and Melakha Rabel a writer.
