= Ivan Boyko =

Soviet military commander (1910–1975)

Ivan Nikiforovich Boyko
- Иван Никифорович Бойко
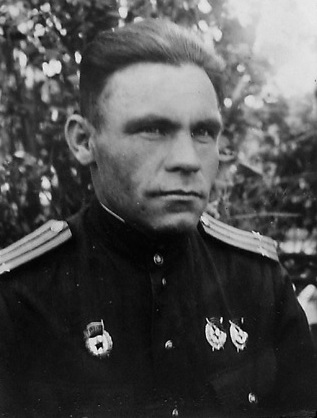
- Born: 24 October [O.S. 11 October] 1910; Zhornyshche village, Podolian Governorate, Russian Empire
- Died: 12 May 1975 (aged 64); Kiev, Ukrainian SSR, USSR
- Military career
- Allegiance: Soviet Union
- Branch: Red Army
- Service years: 1930–1956
- Rank: Colonel
- Commands: 69th Guards Tank Regiment; 64th Guards Tank Brigade
- Conflicts: World War II
- Awards: Hero of the Soviet Union (twice)

Ivan Nikiforovich Boyko (Russian: Ива́н Ники́форович Бо́йко; 24 October [O.S. 11 October] 1910 – 12 May 1975) was the commander of the 69th Guards Tank Regiment and later the 64th Guards Tank Brigade during World War II; he was twice awarded the title Hero of the Soviet Union for his successful combat leadership.

== Early life ==
Boyko was born to a Ukrainian peasant family living in the rural village of Zhornyshche in the Podolian Governorate before the formation of the Soviet Union. After completing primary school he began working, but he would continue his studies in the winter. Eventually, he completed his seventh grade of school in 1927, after which he attended a medical college in Vinnitsa until 1929. He then worked as an accountant at a state farm before voluntarily joining the Red Army in September 1930.

== Prewar military career ==
After entering the military in 1930 Boyko was assigned to the 151st Rifle Regiment, and after completing infantry school in Odessa he became a squad leader within the 2nd Artillery Regiment in 1931. In September 1932 he chose to remain in the Army, and in 1939 he completed further training, which included the Ulyanovsk Armored School and armory courses. Having been placed in commanded of a tank company in 1937, he was transferred to the 13th Armored Division in which he participated in the Battle of Khalkhin-Gol in 1939. In 1940 he became a member of the Communist Party.

== World War II ==
Having first seen combat in World War II in July 1941 during the initial phase of Operation Barbarossa, Boyko was the deputy commander of a reconnaissance battalion at the time. In August he became the commander of the 83rd Tank Battalion, but he was soon chosen for transfer and made the commander of a battalion in the 32nd Tank Brigade. He went on the participate in the Battle of Moscow and the fighting for Tula, and on 28 November he was wounded. Once he recovered in February 1942, he served as a deputy battalion commander in the 1st Tank Army under the command of Mikhail Katukov. In April he took command of his battalion. In September he was placed in command of the 17th Tank Regiment and participated in Battle of Rzhev. His regiment was honored with the Guards designation and renamed the 69th Guards Tank Regiment for its actions in combat during the summer of 1943. The unit went to fight in the defense of Kursk and in the Belgorod-Kharkov Offensive. He was badly wounded during the battle.

On 28 December 1943, the 69th Guards Tank Regiment expelled German forced from Koziatyn as part of the Zhitomir–Berdichev Offensive. Upon receiving orders to advance to Koziatyn, Boyko and his unit began a 35-kilometer march towards the city. The Germans fled in panic at the surprise advance, despite being numerically superior. The attack resulted in the destruction of 20 enemy tanks, one armored train, two vehicles, and two artillery batteries were destroyed. In addition, over a thousand German soldiers were killed and 150 captured. After the offensive, German forces launched a two-day counterattack. Boyko and his unit managed to hold the city despite heavy enemy fire while waiting for reinforcements. For his success in Koziatyn, he was awarded the title Hero of the Soviet Union on 10 January 1944. Less than a month later he was placed in command of the 64th Guards Tank Brigade, which would soon have success during the Proskurov-Chernivtsi operation. In March 1944 Boyko's brigade crossed the Dniester River, advanced 70 meters, and crossed the Prut river, and then advanced into the city of Chernivtsi. Because the brigade had advanced so quickly, they approached the city without many reinforcements and had to fight hard until the remainder of the 8th Guards Motorized Corps arrived before they could completely expel German forces from Chernivtsi. After the successful offensive in the city the 64th Brigade began to head towards Romania. On 26 April 1944 Boyko was awarded the title Hero of the Soviet Union a second time for his leadership of the brigade. He then went on to participate in the Lvov-Sandomierz and Berlin offensives.

== Postwar ==
After the end of the war, Boyko commanded a tank regiment. In 1948 he graduated from the J.V. Stalin Academy of the WPRA Mechanization and Motorization Program, after which he commanded a tank regiment in the Kiev Military District. In 1952 he became a deputy corps commander in Kamchatka. He retired as a colonel in September 1956, after which he lived in Kiev until he died on 21 May 1975 and was buried in the Lukyanovsky Military Cemetery.
