= Petryshyn =

Petryshyn (Ukrainian: Петришин) is a Ukrainian surname. Notable people with the surname include:

- Arcadia Olenska-Petryshyn (1934–1996), Ukrainian art critic
- Hryhorii Petryshyn (1934–1998), Ukrainian priest
- Volodymyr Petryshyn (1929–2020), Ukrainian mathematician
