= Honcharenko =

Honcharenko (Ukrainian: Гончаренко, also transliterated as Goncharenko), is an occupation-related surname of Ukrainian origin. Derived from гончар, it means descendant of a potter. The Belarusian-language version is Hancharenka (Belarusian: Ганчарэнка, also transliterated as Hančarenka).

== People ==
=== Honcharenko ===
- Honcharenko brothers, Ukrainian bandura-makers
- Agapius Honcharenko (1832–1916), Ukrainian priest and human rights activist
- Artem Honcharenko (born 1979), Ukrainian swimmer
- Hnat Honcharenko (1835–c. 1917), Ukrainian musician
- Makar Honcharenko (1912–1997), Soviet-Ukrainian footballer and coach
- Oleksiy Honcharenko (born 1980), Ukrainian politician
- Roman Honcharenko (born 1993), Ukrainian footballer
- Stanislav Honcharenko (born 1960), Soviet-Ukrainian footballer

=== Goncharenko ===
- Aleksandr Goncharenko (born 1959), Kazakhstani football official
- Andrey Goncharenko, Russian billionaire businessman
- Angelina Goncharenko (born 1994), Russian ice hockey player
- Oleg Goncharenko (1931–1986), Soviet-Ukrainian speed skater
- Svetlana Goncharenko (born 1971), Russian runner
- Viktor Goncharenko (born 1977), Belarusian football manager

== See also ==
- Honchar
