= Pavliuk =

Pavliuk, Pavlyuk, Pavluk (German transliteration Pawluk, Pawliuk, Pawlyuk common among emigrants from the Austria-Hungary) is a Ukrainian-language patronymic surname derived from the given name, Pavlo (Paul).

It may refer to:

- David Pavluk of The Downtown Fiction band
- Denys Pavlyuk, Ukrainian modern pentathlete
- Ihor Pavlyuk (born 1967), Ukrainian writer and translator
- Kazimierz Pawluk (1906–1944), Polish World War II Vickers Wellington bomber "Observer and Captain"
- Mariusz Pawluk, Polish military commander, brigadier general
- Mykola Pawluk (born 1956), British TV editor
- Oleksandr Pavlyuk (born 1970), Ukrainian military officer and government official
- Pavlo Pavliuk (died 1638), leader of a 1637 Cossack rebellion
- Yevhen Pavlyuk (born 2002), Ukrainian football player
