= Panchyshyn =

Panchyshyn is a Ukrainian surname. People with the surname include:

- Les Panchyshyn
- Marian Panchyshyn
- Orest Panchyshyn
- Ivan Panchyshyn
