= Lidia Valenta =

Singer, songwriter and musician

Lidia Valenta Лидия Валентиновна Небаба
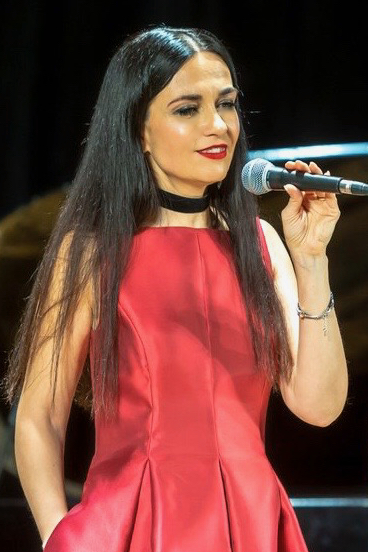

Background information
- Born: Lidia Valentinovna Nebaba; Brest, Belarus
- Origin: Dresden, Germany
- Genres: Pop, Jazz, Folk, Art song, World, Ballad
- Occupations: Singer, Songwriter, Musician
- Instruments: Vocals, Piano
- Years active: 2010–present

Lidia Valenta (born Lidia Valentinovna Nebaba (rus.: Лидия Валентиновна Небаба)) is a singer, songwriter and musician. Her style incorporates elements of pop, jazz, folk, art song, world, and ballads.

== Early life ==
Lidia was born in Brest, Belarus, and grew up in Czech Republik and Russia. Since 1998, she has lived in Germany and calls Dresden her home.

At the age of six, she began to study piano, vocals, and music theory. Soon after, she won the Young Composers Competition in Prague. At the age of eight, she began to sing in choirs in Prague and later in Kaliningrad, which became her home in 1986. She studied humanities at Kaliningrad State University (renamed Immanuel Kant Baltic Federal University). Later studied applied linguistics on the Faculty of Philosophy at the Technical University of Dresden. She also studied vocals at the Lidia Nebaba Theater of Romance Music in Moscow.

== Singing career ==
Valenta has performed at major music venues in Russia and Europe, including the Buryat State Opera and Ballet Theater in Ulan-Ude, Central House of Art Professionals in Moscow, Jupiter Concert Hall in Nizhny Novgorod, Nizhny Novgorod Kremlin, Russian House of Science and Culture in Berlin and the Russian Centre of Culture and Science in Rome.

Valenta writes most of her own songs, but she also draws inspiration from Russian, German, British, and American poetry.

In 2015, she formed the Lidia Valenta Band with jazz-pianist and Hammond organist Jo Aldinger, drummer Tim Hahn and double bass player Clemens Voyé.

== Tours ==
- 2015 – "Love"
- 2016 – "Change of Scene"
- 2017 – "Echo"
- 2018 – "Night Train"
- 2019 – "Weihnachten"
- 2020 – "Oblaka"

== Discography ==
=== Singles ===
- "Nochnoj Poezd" (2010)
- "Follow me" (2011)
- "Not Enough" (2013)
- "Flowless" (2013)
- "I Can't Resist" (2014)
- "I Miss You" (2015)
- "To The Disco" (2015)

=== Song cycles ===
- Night Train (2013): Six Russian Art Songs – songs on poems by Vladimir Isaichev
- Echo (2015): Five Poetic Jazz Songs – songs on Poems by Emily Dickinson and Christina Rossetti

=== Music albums ===
- Weihnachten (2019)
- Oblaka (2020)
- Love (2021)

== Other activities ==
Valenta is also an environmental activist. In September 2012, she was a member of an expedition that flew across Lake Baikal in a hot air balloon to draw attention to environmental issues related to preserving Baikal's ecosystem.

== Art and design ==
In 2014, Valenta began her work as a visual artist and designer, working primarily with porcelain. She collaborated with Dresden Porcelain, one of Germany's oldest porcelain factories, and with Holger John, a German artist whose Dresden art gallery has exhibited her work. The porcelain pieces are handmade and hand-painted.

In April 2016, Valenta combined two art genres, modern art on porcelain and music. Her art song exhibition called "Porcelain Pop" was shown in the historic Barock Gewandhaus in Dresden.

Valenta showed pieces of the collection at the first international porcelain biennale in the Albrechtsburg Castle in Meissen, the birthplace of European porcelain.
