= Tataryn =

Tataryn is a Ukrainian-language ethnonymic surname. It literally means "Tartar person". The Russian-language variant is Tatarin. Notable people with the surname include:

- Dave Tataryn (born 1950), Canadian professional ice hockey player
- Tryfon Tataryn (1886–after 1939), Ukrainian public figure, publicist
