= Boiko Zvetanov =

Boyko Tzvetanov (Bulgarian: Бойко Цветанов, born 14 June 1955) is a Bulgarian operatic tenor. He was taken on as a soloist with the Sofia National Opera from 1982 to 1990. In 1991, he became a member of the ensemble of the Zurich Opera House until his retirement in 2016.

== Early life and training ==
Zvetanov was born in Sofia, Bulgaria. His father was a great music lover and played the guitar as well as the mandolin and founded a string orchestra. He is cited as a strong influence in his son's studies in vocal music. As a child, he took part in various children's choirs singing as a soloist. He studied at the National Academy of Music (Bulgaria) in his native city of Sofia with Professor Chavdar Hadjiev and graduated with a degree in opera singing.

== Career ==
=== Early career ===
He began his career with major roles in Verdi operas such as the Duke in Rigoletto, Foresto in Attila and Radames in Aida, also Lindoro in Rossini's L'italiana in Algeri, Fernando in Donizetti's La Favorita and Pollione in Bellini's Norma. He was equally successful from the beginning as a singer in concerts and oratorios. Zvetanov continued his studies with Boris Christov in Rome, Prof. G. Lehmann and Margarita Lilova in Vienna, also with Carlo Bergonzi at the Verdi Academy in Busseto.

Alongside his many performances in his home country, he has made guest appearances in Germany, Austria, Italy, Switzerland, Netherlands, France, Spain, Portugal, Denmark, Sweden, Hungary, the Czech Republic and Russia. He has also won prizes in international singing competitions.

=== Varna Opera House performances ===
On August 2 2014, Zvetanov debuted as Otello in Giuseppe Verdi's Otello at the Varna State Opera. Zvetanov has performed many times with the composition of the Varna Opera, both in the MMF "Varna Summer" and in other performances - with his participation in "Rural Honor" from the Maskani OFD, Varna opened the Art Salon 2010 in Sofia. He also performed at the opera house's Summer Theater 2011 as Ernani in the opera of the same name by Verdi in 2011 to outstanding reviews. In the Opera in the Summer Theater Varna 2014, he played André Chenier in the opera of the same name by Umberto Giordano, and in the Summer Theater 2015, he celebrated his 60th anniversary with the role of Calaf from Turandot, which he sang about 300 times in several continents.

In celebration of Bulgaria's Liberation Day, Zvetanov, Tsvetelina Vasileva, and Daniela Dimova gave a performance at St. Paul's Church in Strasbourg in 2016. In addition to classical opera arias by composers such as Verdi, Puccini, Mozart, etc., the program presented arias by Bulgarian composers Pancho Vladigerov, Dobri Hristov, and Parashkev Hadzhiev, whose works took heavy inspiration from the country's folklore.

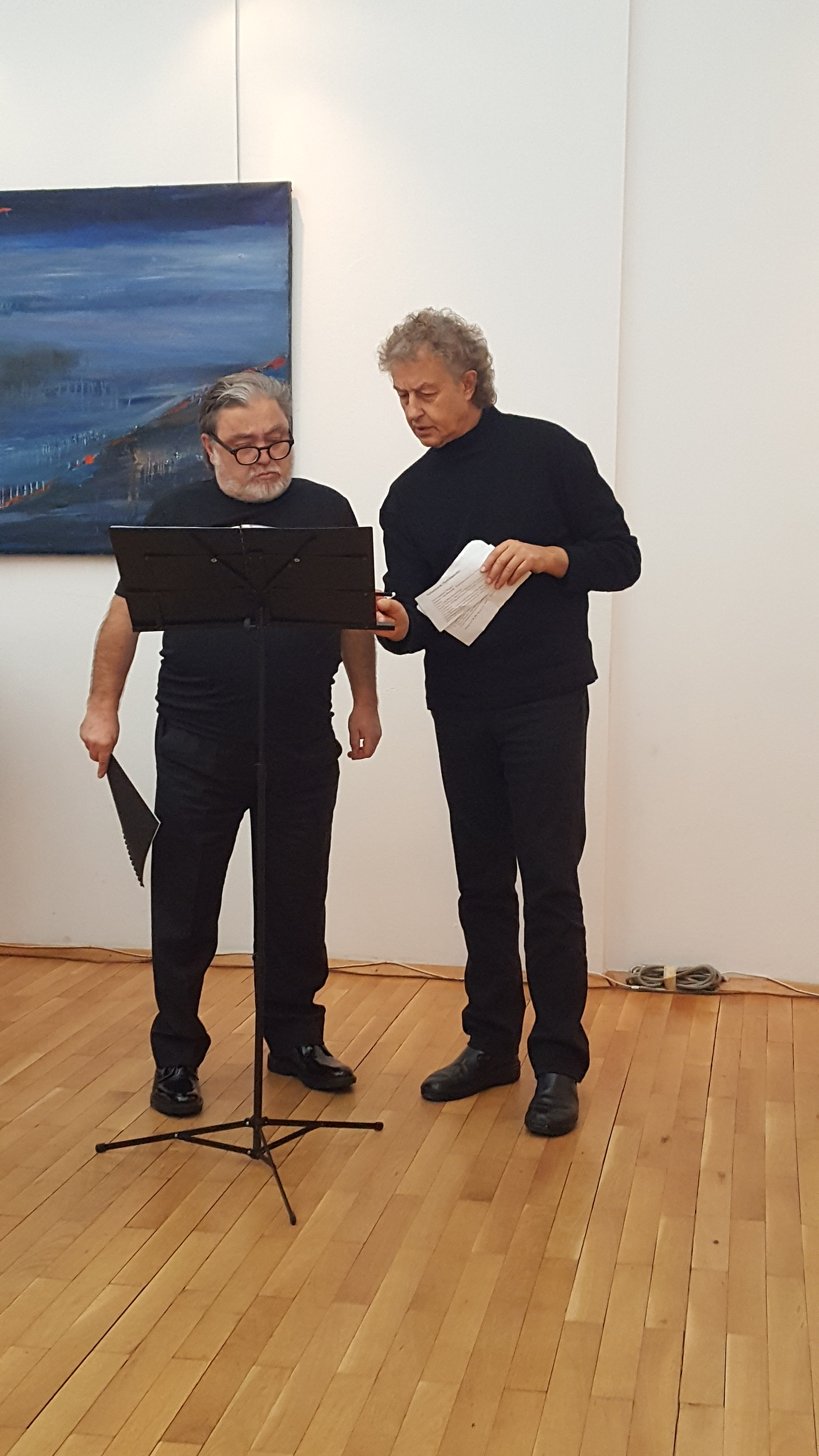
Boiko Zvetanov (left) and composer and pianist Alex Zografov (right) in rehearsal for live performance in Sofia, Bulgaria in 2019

== Awards and recognition ==
In 1988, Zvetanov won his first award, coming in third place at the Bilbao International Singing Competition.

== Discography ==
In 2000, Zvetanov recorded a CD production for MMO Music Group with the orchestra of the Sofia National Opera under the direction of Nayden Todorov.

== Opera roles ==
- Flavio, Norma (Bellini)
- Pollione, Norma (Bellini)
- Gualtiero, Il Pirata (Bellini)
- Lord Arturo Talbo, Il Puritani (Bellini)
- Don José, Carmen (Bizet)
- Giuseppe Hagenbach, La Wally (Catalani)
- Maurizio, Adriana Lecouvreur (Cilea)
- Nemorino, L'Elisir d'amore (Donizetti)
- Fernando, La Favorita (Donizetti)
- Edgardo di Ravenswood, Lucia di Lammermoor (Donizetti)
- Giannetto Malespini, La Cena delle Beffe (Giordano)
- Bogdan Sobinin, Ivan Susanin(Glinka)
- Hauk-Sendorf, Vec Makropulos (Janácek)
- Canio, Pagliacci Canio (Leoncavallo)
- Turiddu, Cavalleria rusticana (Mascagni)
- Jean, Hérodiade Jean (Massenet)
- Belmonte, Die Entführung aus dem Serail (Mozart)
- Grigorij, Boris Godunow (Musorgskij)
- Misail, Boris Godunow (Musorgskij)
- Enzo Grimaldo, La Gioconda (Ponchielli)
- Rodolfo, La Bohème (Puccini)
- Benjamin Franklin Pinkerton, Madama Butterfly (Puccini)
- Des Grieux, Manon Lescaut (Puccini)
- Luigi, Il Tabarro (Puccini)
- Mario Cavaradossi, Tosca (Puccini)
- Calaf, Turandot (Puccini)
- Roberto, Le Villi (Puccini)
- Young Gypsy, Aleko (Rachmaninov)
- Paolo, Francesca da Rimini (Rachmaninov)
- Arnold, Guillaume Tell (Rossini)
- Lindoro, L'Italiana in Algeri (Rossini)
- Argirio,Tancredi (Rossini)
- Italian Tenor, Capriccio (Strauss)
- A Singer, Der Rosenkavalier (Strauss)
- Lenski, Eugene Onegin (Tschaikovsky)
- Radamès, Aida (Verdi)
- Foresto, Attila (Verdi)
- Riccardo, Un Ballo in Maschera (Verdi)
- Don Carlo, Don Carlo (Verdi)
- Ernani, Ernani (Verdi)
- Fenton, Falstaff (Verdi)
- Don Alvaro, La Forza del Destino (Verdi)
- Lombardi alla prima Crociata I Arvino (Verdi)
- Rodolfo, Luisa Miller (Verdi)
- Macduff, Macbeth (Verdi)
- Malcolm, Macbeth (Verdi)
- Ismaele, Nabucco (Verdi)
- Stiffelio, Stiffelio (Verdi)
- Alfredo Germont, La Traviata (Verdi)
- Manrico, Il Trovatore (Verdi)
- Erik, Der Fliegende Holländer (Wagner)
- Sly, Sly (Wolf-Ferrari)
- Malatestino dall'Occhio, Francesca da Rimini (Zandonai)
