= Ivanishin =

Ivanishin, feminine: Ivanishina is a Russian-language matronymic surname of Ukrainian origin. It is derived from the feminine nickname "Ivanikha" (Ukrainian: Иваниха) after the husband named Ivan. Ukrainian equivalent: Ivanyshyn. Notable people with the surname include:

- Anatoly Ivanishin (born 1969), Russian cosmonaut
- Vladimir Ivanishin, (1908-1941), Soviet Chuvash composer
