= Ivashchenko, Belgorod Oblast =

Ivashchenko Иващенково
- Selo
- Location within Belgorod Oblast Location within Russia
- Coordinates: 50°34′N 39°02′E
- Country: Russia
- Region: Belgorod Oblast
- District: Alexeyevsky District
- Time zone: UTC+3:00

Ivashchenko (Russian: Иващенково) is a rural locality (a selo) and the administrative center of Ivashchenkovskoye Rural Settlement, Alexeyevsky District, Belgorod Oblast, Russia. The population was 352 as of 2010. There are six streets.

== Geography ==
Ivashchenko is located 30 km east of Alexeyevka (the district's administrative centre) by road. Vasilchenkov and Berezki are the nearest rural localities.
