= Kovtun =

Kovtun (Ukrainian: Ковтун) is a Ukrainian gender-neutral surname derived from the Slavic word for the hair appearance called Polish plait, as a nickname for a person with unkempt hair, "mophead". The Polish form of the surname is Kołtun; the difference is due to the linguistic phenomenon of L-vocalization. In Russian language the surname retains its Ukrainian form, "Kovtun", although the hair style is "koltun" in Russian.

Notable people with the surname include:

== Kovtun ==
- Anatolij Kovtun (1960–2005), Ukrainian basketball player
- Andriy Kovtun (born 1968), Ukrainian football player
- Dmitry Kovtun (1965–2022), Russian businessman and ex-KGB agent
- Illia Kovtun (born 2003), Ukrainian gymnast
- Marina Kovtun (born 1962), Russian politician
- Maxim Kovtun (born 1995), Russian figure skater
- Natalya Kovtun (born 1964), Russian sprinter
- Oleksiy Kovtun (born 1995), Ukrainian football defender
- Olena Kovtun (born 1966), Ukrainian table tennis player
- Yuri Kovtun (born 1970), Russian football defender

== Koltun, Kołtun ==
- Daniel S. Koltun (1933–2014), American physicist
- Jarosław Kołtun, Polish racer
- Leonid Koltun (born 1944), Ukrainian football coach
- Mykhaylo Koltun (born 1949), Ukrainian bishop
- Sarah Koltun (born 1993), Canadian curler
- Vladlen Koltun, Israeli-American computer scientist and intelligent systems researcher
