= Kravchuk =

Kravchuk is a surname that derived from the occupation of tailor (Ukrainian: кравець, kravets) with addition of a common Ukrainian suffix -chuk.

The name may refer to:

- Andrei Kravchuk (born 1962), Russian director and screenwriter
- Andriy Kravchuk (born 1999), Ukrainian football player
- Antonina Kravchuk (born 1935), Ukrainian economician, First Lady of Ukraine (1991–1994)
- Danylo Kravchuk (born 2001), Ukrainian football player
- Igor Kravchuk (born 1966), Russian ice hockey player
- Konstantin Kravchuk (born 1985), Russian tennis player
- Leonid Kravchuk (1934–2022), first President of Ukraine
- Mikhail Kravchuk (born 1991), Belarusian football player
- Mykhailo Kravchuk (1892–1942), Ukrainian mathematician
- Petro Kravchuk (1962–2022), Ukrainian politician
- Robert Kravchuk (born 1955), American financial and political scholar
- Roksolana Kravchuk (born 1997), Ukrainian footballer
- Stanislav Kravchuk (born 1978), Ukrainian freestyle skier
- Valentyn Kravchuk (1944–2003), Ukrainian rower
- Valery Kravchuk (born 1955), Ukrainian heavyweight weightlifter
- Viktor Kravchuk (born 1961), Russian naval officer
- Yevheniya Kravchuk (born 1985), Ukrainian politician
