= Honchar =

Honchar (Cyrillic: Гончар) is an occupational surname of Ukrainian origin, literally meaning "potter". Notable people with the surname include:

- Andriy Honchar
- Oleksandr Honchar (footballer)
- Oles Honchar, Ukrainian writer
- Ihor Honchar
- Ivan Honchar, Ukrainian artist and ethnographer, the namesake of the Ivan Honchar Museum
- Serhiy Honchar, Ukrainian racing cyclist
