= Ponomaryov =

Ponomaryov, also spelled Ponomariov or Ponomarev (Russian: Пономарёв), or Ponomaryova (feminine; Пономарёва) is a Russian language patronymic surname derived from the occupation of ponomar ("sexton"), and literally meaning "sexton's son". The word "Ponomar" has also become a surname. Surnames with similar origin include Palamar, Ponomarenko, Palamarenko, Palamarchuk, Ponamarchuk, Ponomarchuk.

Notable people with the surname include:

== Ponomarev, Ponimariov, Ponomaryov ==
- Aleksandr Ponomaryov (actor, born 1765) (1765–1831), Russian actor
- Aleksandr Ponomaryov (actor, born 1960) (born 1960), Russian actor
- Aleksandr Ponomaryov (artist, born 1953) (born 1953), Russian artist
- Alexander Ponomarev (artist) (born 1957), Russian artist
- Aleksandr Ponomarev (footballer, born 1918) (1918–1973), Soviet Ukrainian football player and manager
- Aleksandr Ponomaryov (footballer, born 1986), Russian football player
- Anton Ponomarev (born 1988), Kazakh basketball player
- Arkady Ponomaryov (born 1956), Russian politician
- Boris Ponomarev (1905–1995), Soviet politician and ideologist
- Dmitry Ponomarev (businessman) (born 1960), Russian entrepreneur
- Igor Ponomarev, Russian diplomat
- Igor Ponomaryov, (born 1960), Soviet football player and manager
- Ilya Ponomarev (born 1975), Russian politician
- Lev Ponomaryov (born 1941), Russian politician and human rights activist
- Maksim Ponomaryov (born 1980), Russian cosmonaut
- Mikhail Ponomaryov (1920-2006), Soviet fighter pilot
- Nikolai Ponomaryov (1918–1997), Soviet graphic artist
- Oleksandr Ponomariov (born 1973), Ukrainian singer
- Pavel Andreyevich Ponomaryov (1844–1883), Russian vice consul in Hankow and philanthropist
- Pavel Ivanovich Ponomaryov (1903–1944), Soviet army officer and Hero of the Soviet Union
- Pavel Yelizarovich Ponomaryov (1904–1973), Soviet army officer and Hero of the Soviet Union
- Prokopiy Ponomaryov (1774–1853), Russian entrepreneur, public figure, and philanthropist
- Pyotr Ponomaryov (1924–1943), Soviet soldier and Hero of the Soviet Union
- Ruslan Ponomariov (born 1983), Ukrainian chess player and former FIDE world champion
- Sergey Ponomarev (footballer) (born 1956), Russian football player
- Sergey Ponomarev (photographer) (born 1980), Russian photographer
- Sergei Ponomaryov (born 1953), Russian football coach and player
- Sergei Ponomaryov (officer) (1906–1991), Soviet army officer and Hero of the Soviet Union
- Valery Ponomarev (born 1943), American-Russian jazz trumpeter
- Vyacheslav Ponomarev (public figure), Self-proclaimed mayor of Sloviansk, Ukraine
- Vasili Ponomaryov (born 2002), Russian ice hockey player
- Vladimir Ponomaryov (footballer, born 1940) (Vladimir Alekseyevich Ponomaryov), Soviet international footballer
- Vladimir Ponomaryov (footballer, born 1987) (Vladimir Sergeyevich Ponomaryov), Russian footballer
- Vladimir Ponomaryov (actor), see Qumi-Qumi
- Vladimir Ponomaryov (runner) (born 1952), Soviet Olympic middle-distance runner
- Vyacheslav Ponomarev (footballer) (born 1978), Uzbek footballer
- Yury Ponomaryov (politician), Yury Ivanovich Ponomaryov (1946–2020), Russian politician
- Yury Ponomaryov (pilot), Yury Anatolyevich Ponomaryov (1932–2005), Soviet cosmonaut
- Yury Ponomaryov (banker), Yury Valentinovich Ponomaryov (born 1946), Russian banker

== Ponomaryova, Ponomareva ==
- Anna Ponomaryova (1920–2009), Soviet fencer
- Ksenya Ponomaryova (1961–2016), Russian editor and media manager
- Larisa Ponomaryova (born 1949), Russian politician
- Margarita Ponomaryova (born 1963), Russian hurdler
- Natalia Ponomareva (born 1982), Uzbekistani pair skater
- Nina Ponomaryova (1929–2016), Russian discus thrower
- Valentina Ponomaryova (1933–2023), Soviet cosmonaut
- Valentina Ponomaryova (singer) (born 1939), Russian jazz singer
