= Yuri Ponomaryov =

- Yury Ponomaryov (politician), Yury Ivanovich Ponomaryov (1946–2020), Russian politician
- Yury Ponomaryov (pilot), Yury Anatolyevich Ponomaryov (1932–2005), Soviet cosmonaut
- Yury Ponomaryov (banker), Yury Valentinovich Ponomaryov (born 1946), Russian banker
