= Ponomarenko =

Ponomarenko (Ukrainian: Пономаренко) is a Ukrainian-language patronymic surname derived from the occupation of ponomar (sexton). The surname is common in Ukraine, Russia, and Belarus.

The surname Ponomarenko may refer to the following people:

- Alexander Ponomarenko (born 1964), Russian billionaire businessman
- Anthony Ponomarenko (born 2001), American ice dancer
- Dmytro Ponomarenko (born 1991), Ukrainian track cyclist
- Illia Ponomarenko (born 1992), Ukrainian journalist
- Ivan Ponomarenko (born 1998), Ukrainian footballer
- Larysa Ponomarenko (born 1977), Ukrainian Paralympic volleyball player
- Lidiya Ponomarenko (1922–2013), Ukrainian historian
- Matviy Ponomarenko (born 2006), Ukrainian footballer
- Mikhail Ponomarenko (born 1999), Russian footballer
- Panteleimon Ponomarenko (1902–1984), Soviet-Ukrainian administrator
- Sergei Ponomarenko (born 1960), Russian ice dancer
- Sergei Yuryevich Ponomarenko (born 1987), Russian footballer
- Serhiy Ponomarenko (born 1983), Ukrainian footballer
- Svetlana Ponomarenko (born 1969), Russian long-distance runner
- Špela Ponomarenko Janić (born 1981), Slovenian canoer
- Viacheslav Ponomarenko (born 1982), Ukrainian lieutenant colonel and rugby player
- Vitaliy Ponomarenko (footballer) (born 1969), Ukrainian footballer
- Vitaliy Ponomarenko (1974–2008), Ukrainian powerlifter
- Volodymyr Ponomarenko (born 1972), Ukrainian footballer
- Volodymyr Ponomarenko (athlete) (born 1992), Ukrainian Paralympic athlete

== See also ==
- Palamarenko
- Ponomar
- Ponomarchuk
- Ponomaryov
