= Yury Ponomaryov =

Yury Ponomaryov may refer to:

- Yury Ponomaryov (politician) (Yury Ivanovich Ponomaryov, 1946–2020), Russian politician
- Yury Ponomaryov (pilot) (Yury Anatolyevich Ponomaryov, 1932–2005), Soviet cosmonaut
- Yury Ponomaryov (banker) (Yury Valentinovich Ponomaryov, born 1946), Russian banker
