= Snizhana Babkina =

Ukrainian actress and dancer (born 1985)

- Сніжана Бабкіна
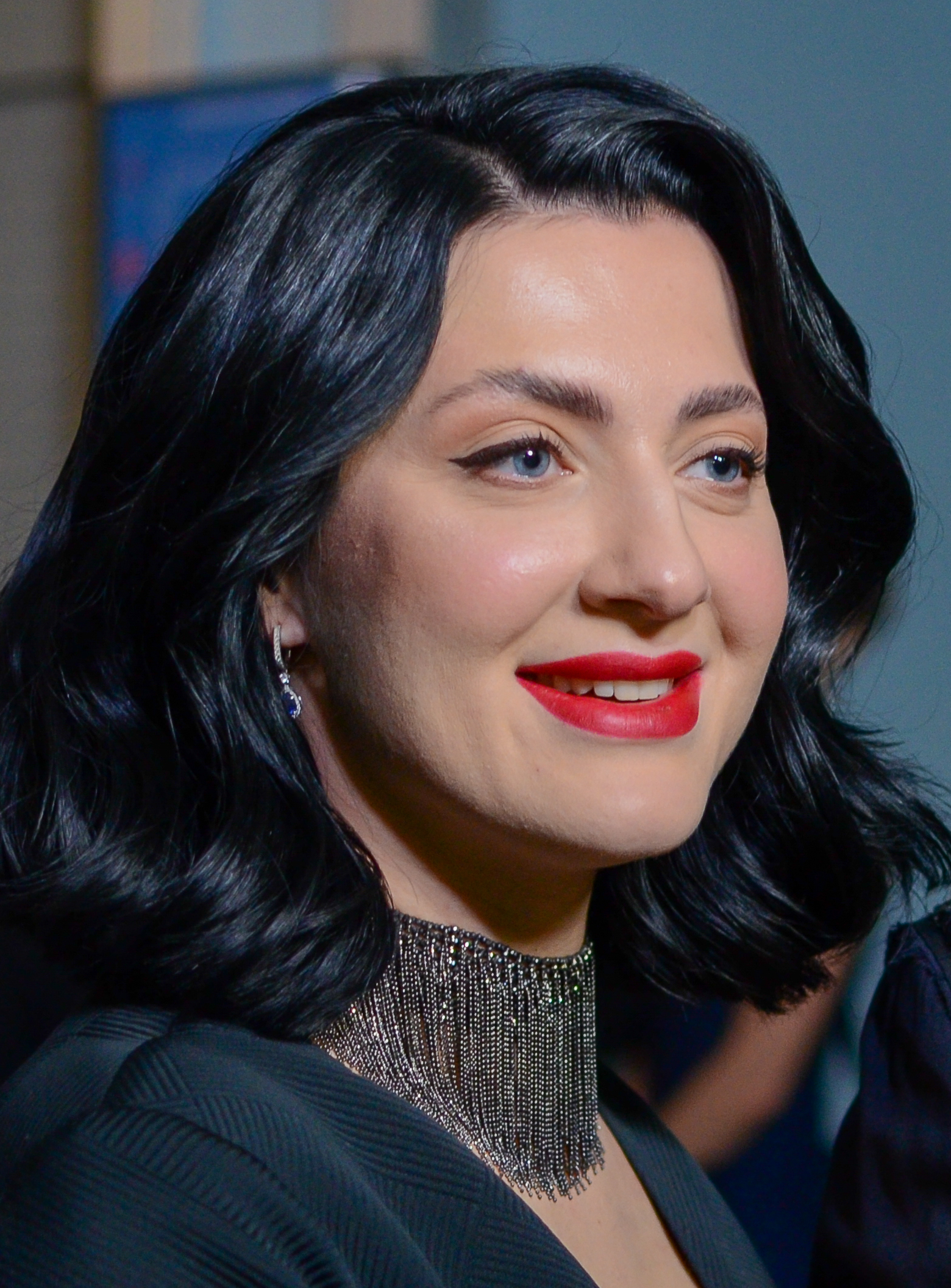
- Snizhana in 2019
- Born: Snizhana Vartanyan; 8 July 1985 (age 41); Kharkiv, Ukrainian SSR, Soviet Union (now Ukraine)
- Education: Kyiv National I. K. Karpenko-Kary Theatre, Cinema and Television University
- Occupations: Actress; dancer; blogger
- Years active: 2007–present
- Spouse: Serhii Babkin (m. 2009)

Snizhana Babkina (Note: Ukrainian: Сніжана Бабкіна) (née Vartanian; (Note: Ukrainian: Вартанян) born 8 July 1985) is a Ukrainian actress and dancer who became the wife and manager of Serhii Babkin, and the participant in the Tantsi z zirkamy (V season).

== Early life and education ==
Born on 8 July 1985, in the Ukrainian city of Kharkiv, she received her degree at the Kyiv National I. K. Karpenko-Kary Theatre, Cinema and Television University. She then went back to Kharkiv and continued to work as a dancer at the Theater 19 in Kharkiv.

== Managerial career ==
Snizhana participated in Dracula plays in 2019 and gave a performance during her pregnancy. The actress then shared a fresh tweet in which she claimed that the performance went well and that all she had gone through had been for nothing.

A controversy involving Babkin and his band 5'nizza where performers use the Somewhere Show promoter's services to organize charity concerts overseas; the promoter mostly sells tickets for Russian events. Snizhana, the performer's concert director, created a video message to put a stop to this tale. She explained who supports them and how their job is organized overseas, adding that all of the money was handed to the Ukrainian Armed Forces.

Snizhana stood up for her husband when he was accused of singing Russian songs during charity events hosted by the band 5'nizza in the US. She stated in her Instagram stories that since the band's concert schedule is nearly entirely composed of Russian songs, it is unnecessary to draw comparisons between the band's and the singer's solo projects in terms of inventiveness. She said, during 2022–2023, they were distributed to charity foundations, Kharkiv volunteers, children, the armed forces, and the 127th Kharkiv City Defense Brigade.

== Personal life ==
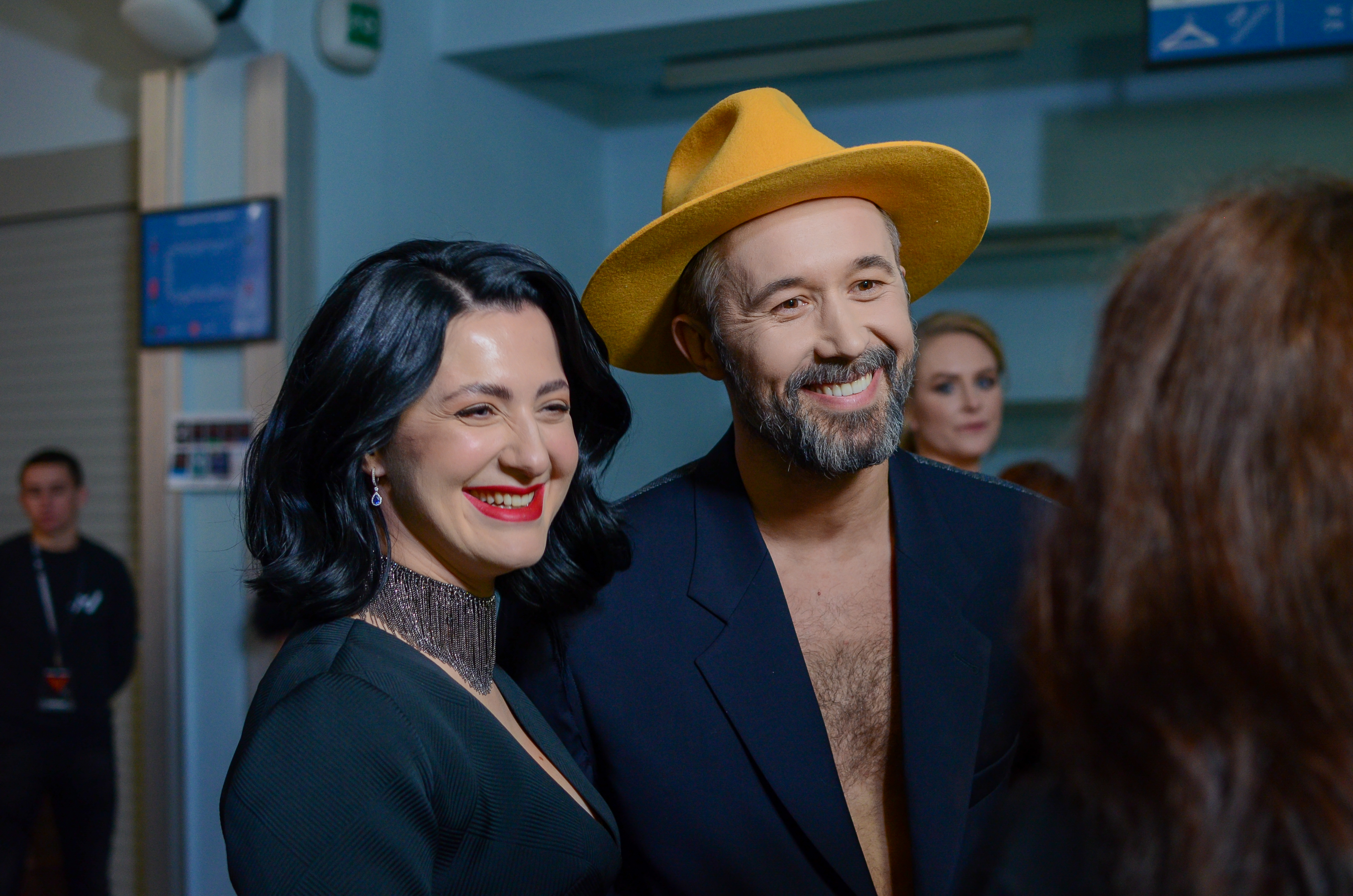
Snizhana and Babkin in 2019

Up to 2012, Serhii Babkin performed for twelve years at Theater 19, where he met Snizhana in 2007. Their wedding took place on 11 May 2008, and it was officially registered on 27 March 2009. Three children are being raised by the couple. 2010 saw her give birth to Veselina, her daughter. From his first marriage, he had a son named Arthur. Elisha, her son, was born to her on 18 June 2019. She discovered three years after the wedding that Babkin had been unfaithful to her on a frequent basis.

When Russia invaded Ukraine in 2022, Snizhana and her family resided in Germany with her husband and children. They spent some time living overseas as well, ending in November 2022, when Babkin then went back to Ukraine. When Babkin was suspected of fleeing, Snizhana defended him.

As of 8 January 2024, family of Snizhana is currently residing in the US. She shares updates on their adventure on her Instagram. She has previously described their visit to a mall in New York City. Ultimately, she shared a picture in which she was seen at one time with three of her distinctly adult children. The artist walked up to the observation deck with her boys and daughter and took in the view of New York. The family resided in her closest friend's home.

== Filmography ==
Takes part in the fourth season of Танці з зірками alongside her husband, finishing in fifth place. Snizhana has been involved in several films:

Year	Name	Role	Notes
2008	Розыгрыш	Herself	Debut film
2014	Olexandr Dovzhenko. Odesa Dawn	Yuliya Solntseva	
2019	11 дітей з Моршина	Yuzik	

== Awards and recognitions ==
Award	Year	Category	Result
Yearly Ukrainian National Awards	2017	Best Manager	Nominated
Yearly Ukrainian National Awards	2018	Best Manager	Nominated
