= Palamar =

Palamar is a Ukrainian occupational surname literally meaning 'sacristan', sexton. Russian-language equivalent: Ponomar. Notable people with the surname include:

- Ruslan Palamar
- Sviatoslav Palamar
- Vita Palamar

== See also ==
- Palamarchuk
- Palamarenko
