= Dmitry Ponomarev =

Dmitry Ponomarev may refer to:

- Dmitry Ponomarev (businessman) (1952–2020), Russian entrepreneur
- Dmitry Ponomarev (submariner) (1908–1982), Soviet submarine commander
