= Unplugged =

Unplugged may refer to:

- Acoustic music, music not produced through electronic means
- Unplugged weekend, a deliberate break from digital devices
- "Unplugged" (B.A.P song), 2014
- "Unplugged" (Modern Family), a 2010 episode of Modern Family

== Albums and EPs ==
- Unplugged (5'nizza album), 2002
- Unplugged (Aventura album), 2004
- Unplugged (Bryan Adams album), 1997
- Unplugged (Hurd album), 1999
- Unplugged (Kerber album), 1999
- Unplugged (The Korgis album), 2006
- Unplugged (Leessang album), 2012
- Unplugged (Siti Nurhaliza album), 2015
- Unplugged (Unspoken album), 2015
- Unplugged (The Official Bootleg), a 1991 album by Paul McCartney
- Unplugged: Live from Sugarhill Studios, a 2013 EP by Lynch Mob
- MTV Unplugged, a TV and album series showcasing popular musical artists playing acoustic instruments
  - MTV Unplugged (10,000 Maniacs album), 1993
  - MTV Unplugged (Bob Dylan album) 1995
  - MTV Unplugged (Die Fantastischen Vier album), 2000
  - MTV Unplugged in New York (Nirvana album), 1994
  - MTV Unplugged (Katy Perry EP), 2009
  - MTV Unplugged (Mariah Carey EP), 1992
  - MTV Unplugged (Pearl Jam album), 2019
  - MTV Unplugged (Shakira album), 2000
  - MTV Unplugged (Shawn Mendes album), 2017
  - Unplugged (Alice in Chains album), 1996
  - Unplugged (Alicia Keys album), 2005
  - Unplugged (Arrested Development album), 1992
  - Unplugged (The Corrs album), 1999
  - Unplugged (Eric Clapton album), 1992
  - Unplugged (Mizraab album), 2012
  - Unplugged (Neil Young album), 1993
