= Volodymyr Denshchykov =

Ukrainian actor and artist (1952–2022)

- Born: 1 July 1952; Kyiv, Ukrainian SSR, USSR
- Died: 21 April 2022 (aged 69)
- Occupations: Actor, artist

Volodymyr Denshchykov (Ukrainian: Володимир Анатолійович Денщиков; 1 July 1952 – 21 April 2022) was a Ukrainian actor and artist.

== Biography ==
Denshchykov was born in Kyiv. He attended the Kyiv National I. K. Karpenko-Kary Theatre, Cinema and Television University, where he earned his degree based on "Artist of Dramatic Theater and Cinema" in 1974. Denshchykov worked as a director and production designer at the Crimean Academic Theater named after M. Gorky from 1975 to 2007, in which he had taught about acting, directing and scenography at the University of Culture of Simferopol, also known as "Crimean University of Culture, Arts and Tourism.

Denshchykov had acted in theatre, in which he played in over 100 roles. He took the Russian citizenship after the Annexation of Crimea by the Russian Federation for which Denshchykov was welcomed. He suffered a stroke once for which his work was occasionally knotted twist its procedure or knitting-collage. Denshchykov had worked for over 30 years. In 2007, he was a teacher. Denshchykov was a recipient of the ARC Prize from 2009, in which he was considered nominated. He was also honored with the Laureate of the Prize of the Autonomous Republic of Crimea.

Denshchykov was honored with the Simferopol City Council "Star of Glory and Honor" in 2012, for which it was a clear decision. He was honored with medals, such as, Knight of the Order of St. Vladimir Equal-to-the-Apostles, Honorary Academician of the Crimean Academy of Sciences (Professor), Order "For Merit" of the III (degree), Order of Merit and People's Artist of Ukraine.

Denshchykov died on 21 April 2022, at the age of 69.
