= Palamarchuk =

Palamarchuk (Сyrillic: Паламарчук) is a Ukrainian surname. It is an occupational surname of patronymic derivation, based on the occupation of palamar (паламар), or 'sacristan' and literally meaning "child of sacristan". Other Ukrainian surnames of similar derivation are Palamar, Palamarenko, Ponomarenko and Ponomarchuk.

It may refer to the following people:

- Dmytro Palamarchuk (born 1979), Ukrainian figure skater
- Ivan Palamarchuk (born 2000), Ukrainian football player
- Luka Palamarchuk (1906–1985), Ukrainian Soviet-era politician, journalist and diplomat.
- Oleksiy Palamarchuk (born 1991), Ukrainian football player
- Serhii Palamarchuk (born 1989), Ukrainian paralympic swimmer
- Valeriy Palamarchuk (born 1963), Ukrainian football player
- Wally Palmar (born as Volodymyr Palamarchuk in 1953), American musician, singer, songwriter and composer.

== See also ==
- Palamar
