= Mykhailo Urytskyi =

Ukrainian puppet theater director

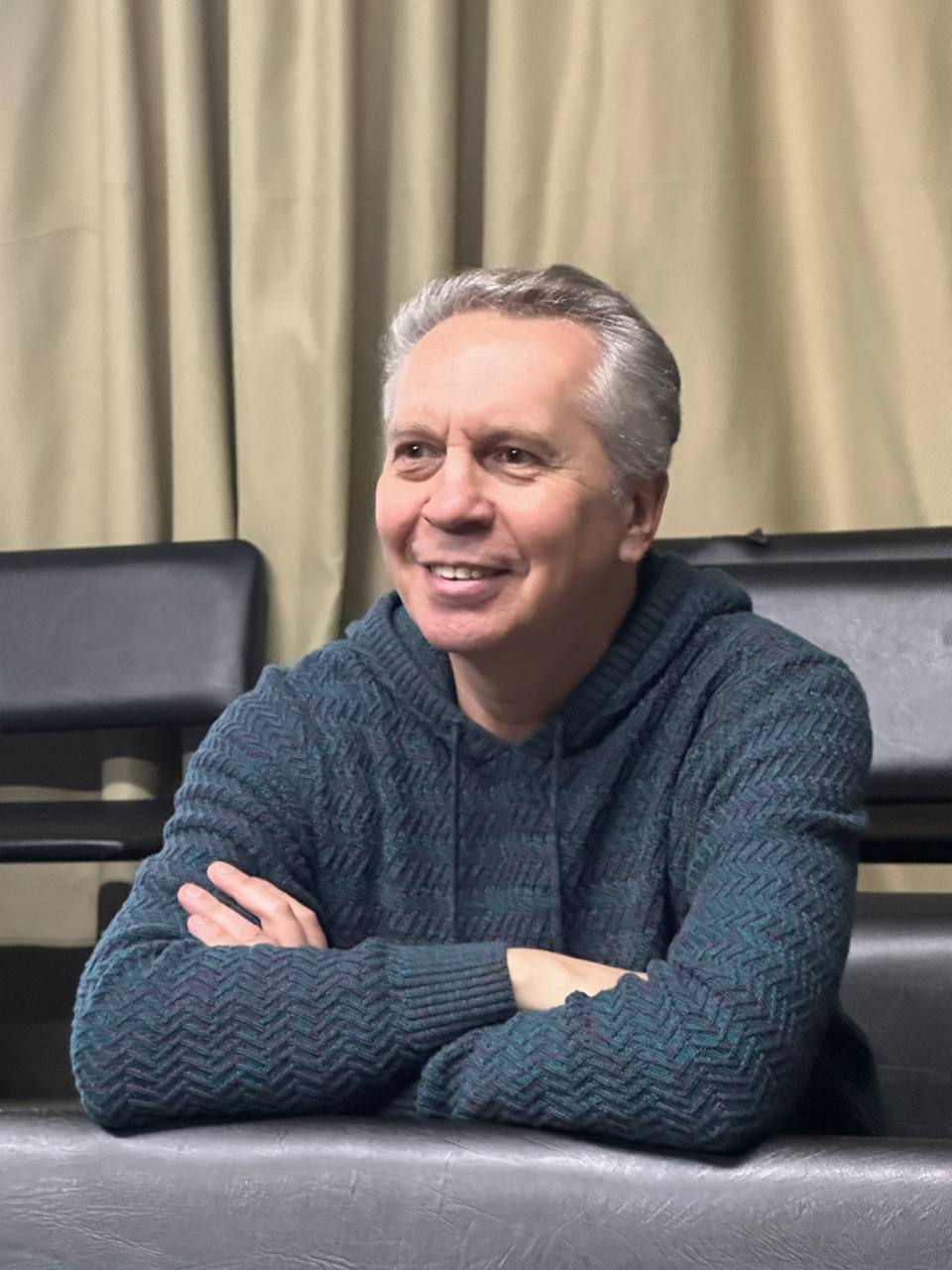
- Mykhailo Urytskyi in 2020.
- Born: Mykhailo Iakovych Urytskyi; June 3, 1965 (age 61); Simferopol, Soviet Union
- Occupation: Theatre director
- Years active: 1988–present

Mykhailo Urytskyi (Ukrainian: Михайло Якович Урицький; born June 3, 1965) is a Ukrainian puppet theater director, and a teacher at The Kyiv National I. K. Karpenko-Kary Theatre, Cinema and Television University.

Mykhailo Urytskyi is a laureate of international festivals and theater awards.

== Biography ==
First higher education – actor of the puppet theater (Kharkiv National Kotlyarevsky University of Arts from 1982 to 1988).

Second higher education – director of the puppet theater (Kyiv National I. K. Karpenko-Kary Theatre, Cinema and Television University from 2006 to 2007). M. Urytskyi is the author of the scientific work Peculiarities of psychological perception of various forms of the puppet theater by children of preschool age.

For seven years Mykhailo Urytskyi worked as an actor in the Crimean Puppet Theater (Simferopol) under the direction of Boris Azarov. He embodied on the stage images in the plays All Mice Love Cheese Dyula Urban, Shreds on the Scatter by Grigoriy Oster, The Upside Down Tale by Donald Bisset, and Snoogle by John Priestley.

In 1994 Mykhailo left the theater and organized one of the first private puppet theaters in Ukraine – the theatre of fairytale Harlequin (Ukrainian: Арлекіно; Simferopol). The first director's productions are The Steadfast Tin Soldier and The Princess and the Pea by Hans Christian Andersen's fairy tales, Peter Yershov's The Little Humpbacked Horse (Konyok-Gorbunok), Atanas Popescu's The Little Sunbeam, Carlo Gozzi's The Love for Three Oranges.

== Directing activity ==
At the invitation of Sergei Efremov, an artistic director of the Kyiv Municipal Academic Puppet Theater, M. Urytskyi moved to Kyiv to take the post of the director of the theater. For 10 years of work he has staged 15 performances, which have brought 6 municipal prizes Kyiv Pectoral to the theater. (According to the data of 2017).

In addition to working in the Kyiv Theater, he performed productions in theaters of Ukraine (Odesa, Mykolaiv, Poltava, Simferopol), Russia (Volgograd, Krasnodar, Makhachkala, Naberezhnye Chelny, Tula, Yoshkar-Ola), Belarus (Maladzyechna), Lithuania (Panevėžys), Slovakia (Košice), Moldova (Chișinău) and others.

In his works Mykhailo refers to the folk tales of the world (The Magic Lamp of Aladdin, The Frog Princess, The Goat-Dereza, The Magic Swan Geese, The Magic Violin), the legacy of the classics of children's literature (Cinderella by Charles Perrault, Why the long nose at the elephant by Rudyard Kipling, The Little Humpbacked Horse (Konyok-Gorbunok) by Pyotr Yershov), works by contemporary authors (The Magic Lotus by Lyudmila Ulitskaya, The Tired Devil by Serhii Kovalev). According to his own confession, his favourite author is Hans Christian Andersen, whose tales formed the basis for more than 10 performances he staged (The Nightingale, The Steadfast Tin Soldier, Thumbelina, The Ugly Duckling, The Princess and the Pea).

Mykhailo Urytskyi equally successfully works with the children's repertoire (Puss in Boots by Charles Perrault, The Sunbeam by Atanas Popescu, Gasan – the Seeker for Happiness by Eugene Speransky) and the performances for the adult audience (A Midsummer Night's Dream by William Shakespeare, Oscar and the Lady in Pink by Éric-Emmanuel Schmitt, The Love for Three Oranges (fairy tale)|Love for the Three Oranges by Carlo Gozzi). Realized a number of projects in the genre of musical theater (musical Ali Baba and The forty Thieves by Veniamin Smekhov to the music of Volodymyr Bystryakov, musical tale The Adventures of Buratino by Aleksey Tolstoy to the music of Alexey Rybnikov).

According to the data of 2017, M. Urytskyi has staged more than 50 performances.

== Pedagogical and social activities ==
From 2013 to 2015 M. Urytskyi served as a vice-president and a chairman of the commission for the protection of professional, social and material interests of UNIMA members. He is a theater curator of the project Bylo ne bylo].

Since 2008 Mykhailo Urytskyi has been working as a teacher at the Kyiv National I. K. Karpenko-Kary Theatre, Cinema and Television University (specialty Actor of the Puppet Theater, Directing the Puppet Theater). Among the graduates there are directors Lyudmila Zemelko (Vinnytsia Regional Academic Puppet Theater), Marichka Vlasova (Zaporozhye Regional Puppet Theater); actors of the theater and cinema Tatiana Kazantseva, Pavel Borysenok, Maria Senko, Vasily Protsyuk, Yulia Olekseenko, Vladimir Shikalo and others.

Mykhailo Urytskyi lives and works in Kyiv.

== Awards and recognition ==
The director's works are awarded with numerous awards and prizes of the Kyiv, all-Ukrainian and international festivals, among which there are the Grand Prix 2008 of the International Theater Festival for Children and Youth Luchafarul (Iași, Romania) for the performance Nightingale (Volgograd Regional Puppet Theater). He became a laureate in the category Best Director of the International Festival-Competition INSPIRATION The international Theater Arts Competition-Festival (Turku, Finland) for the performance Thumbelina (Dagestan State Puppet Theater); of the II International Festival of puppet theaters of the Caspian states The Caspian coast (Astrakhan, Russia) for the performance The Steadfast Tin Soldier (Dagestan State Puppet Theater); of the XIV International Festival of theaters for children Іnterlyalka-2013 (Uzhhorod, [Ukraine) for the performance Thumbelina (the Kyiv Municipal Academic Puppet Theater); of the XXIII International Festival of Puppet Theaters SPOTKANIA (Toruń, Poland) for the performance Oscar (the Kyiv Municipal Academic Puppet Theater).

Mykhailo Urytskyi is a multiple winner of the theatrical award Kyiv Pectoral in the nominations Best Performance for Children (2012 – Thumbelina, 2016 – Why the long nose at the elephant). He became the first and the only director for the present, who won in two main nominations of the Kyiv Pectoral: performance Oscar (performance) (the Kyiv Municipal Academic Puppet Theater) was recognized by the experts of the award as the best by the results of 2016 in the nomination Best Performance of the Dramatic Theater, and Mikhail Urytskyi became the laureates of the nomination Best director's work.
