= Luk (band) =

Ukrainian musical band

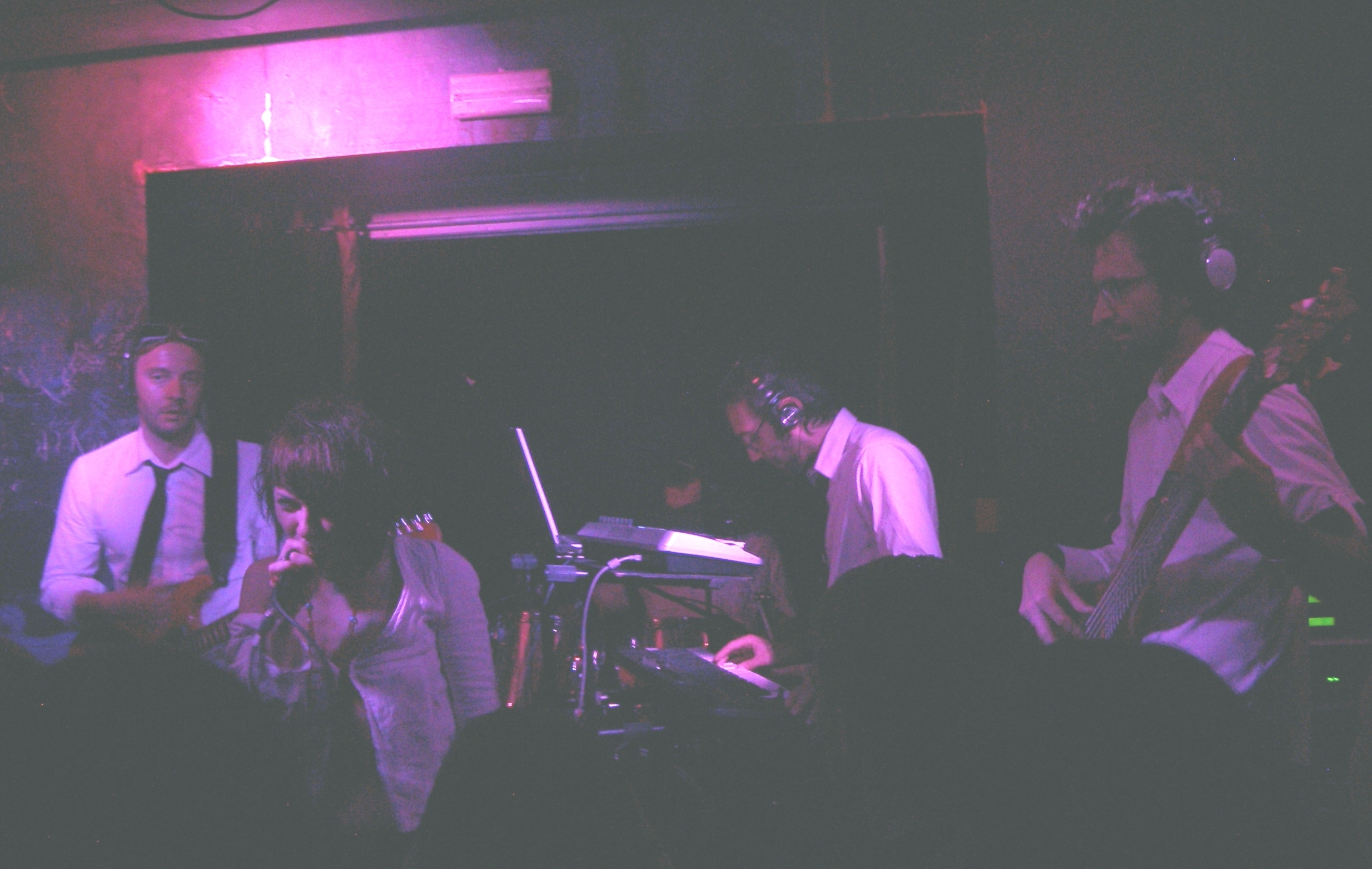
- Luk performing in 2009

Background information
- Origin: Kharkiv, Ukraine
- Genres: Acid jazz; lounge; rock
- Years active: 1999–2011
- Label: Moon
- Past members: Olha Gerasimova; Oleh Serdyuk; Serhiy Belmas; Velentyn Panyuta; Oleksandr Kratinov

Luk (stylised as Lюk) was a Ukrainian band from Kharkiv, formed in 1999, who played acid jazz, lounge, and rock, singing in Ukrainian, Russian, and French. After releasing four studio albums, the band announced its breakup in 2011.

Luk collaborated with Kharkiv-based Ukrainian writer Serhiy Zhadan, who wrote most of their Ukrainian-language lyrics. They also recorded a number of songs with 5'Nizza members Andriy Zaporozhets and Serhiy Babkin.

== Band members ==
- Olha Gerasimova – vocals
- Oleh Serdyuk – keyboards
- Serhiy Belmas – bass
- Velentyn Panyuta – guitar
- Oleksandr Kratinov – drums

== Discography ==
- Tourist Zone (2002)
- Lemon (2004)
- Sex (2005)
- The Best of Luk (2008)
- Мамина юность (Mamina Yunost, 2009)
