= Mykhaylo Melnyk =

- Михайло Васильович Ме́льник
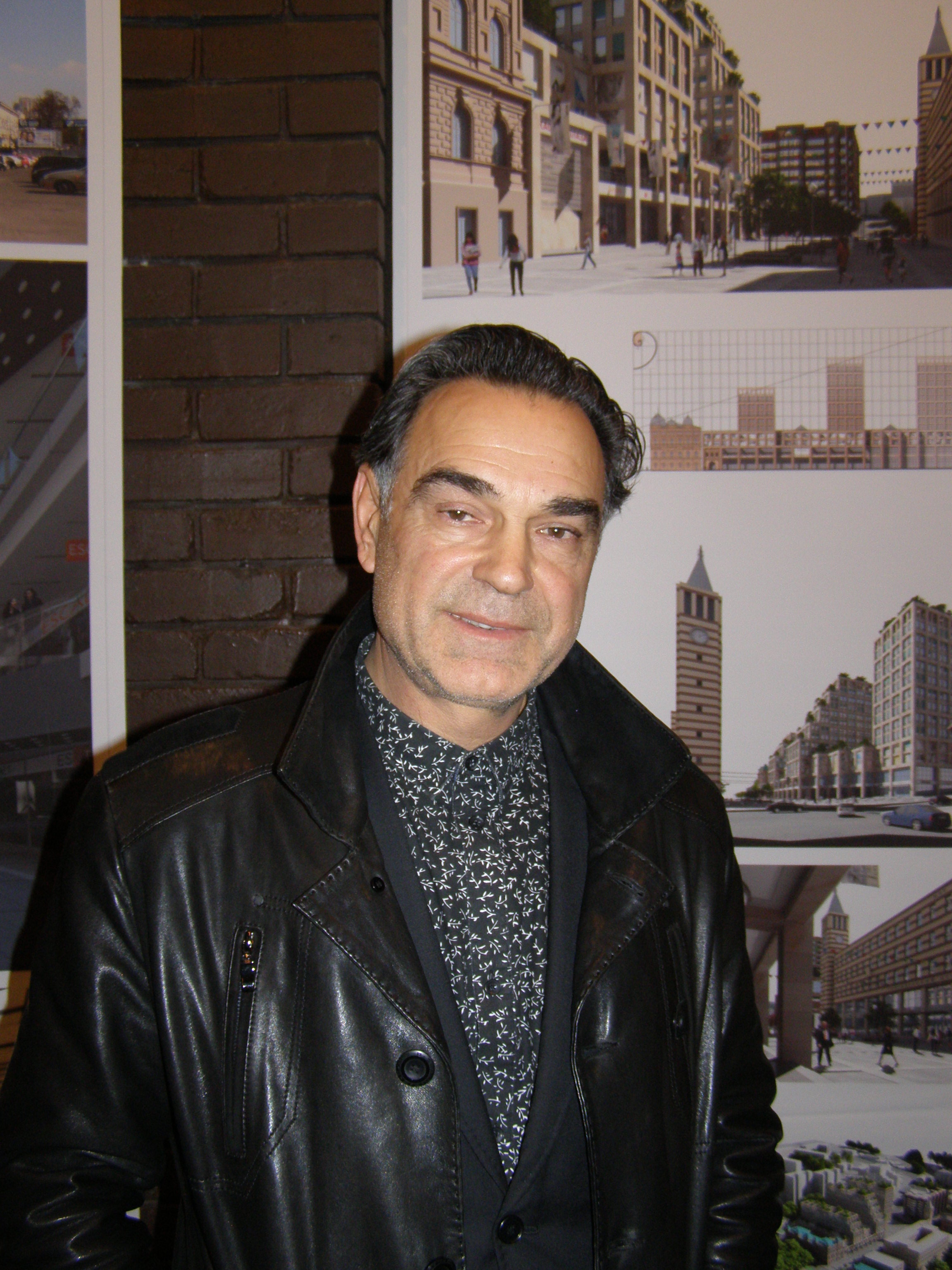
- Born: May 18, 1957 (age 68)
- Awards: Shevchenko National Prize
- Honours: People's Artist of Ukraine; Merited Artist of Ukraine

Mikhaylo Vasyliovych Melnyk (Ukrainian: Михайло Васильович Мельник, romanized: Mykhailo Vasyliovych Melnyk; May 18, 1957, village of Beevo-Komuna, Lypova Dolyna district, Sumy region) is a Ukrainian theater director, theater actor, screenwriter, music editor, musician. Honored Artist of Ukraine (1994), People's Artist of Ukraine (2005), Laureate of the Shevchenko National Prize of Ukraine (2007). Founder, artistic director, director and the only actor of the one-of-a-kind Theater of one actor "Scream" in Dnipro.

== Biography ==
Mikhailo Melnyk was born on May 18, 1957, in the village of Beevo-Kommuna, now Melnykove, Lipovodolinsky district, Sumy region of Ukraine. After military service in the Soviet army, which took place in the Separate Guard of Honor Company in Moscow, Melnik arrived in Kyiv, where he worked at an aircraft factory as a turner. In 1982 he graduated from the Kiev National University of Theatre, Cinema and Television named after I.K. Karpenko-Kary, class of Professor Ninel Antonovna Bychenko, Honored Art Worker of Ukraine. According to the distribution, the young artist was sent to the Nikolaev Academic Ukrainian Theater of Drama and Musical Comedy, where he worked for three months. After that, on the advice of colleagues, he moved to Dnepropetrovsk. Anatoly Yakovlevich Litko, the chief director of the Taras Shevchenko Ukrainian Music and Drama Theater, accepted Melnik into the theater without an audition. On the small stage of the Taras Shevchenko Dnepropetrovsk Theatre, where Mikhail Melnyk has been working since 1989, he staged Haidamaks based on the poem by Taras Shevchenko, The Lost Ones based on the works of Ostap Vyshnya. Wanted to launch Michel de Gelderode's Escorial, but the play did not pass the artistic council.

He combined acting and directing work in the drama theater with the artistic direction of the theater studio at the Dnipropetrovsk Assembly College, whose performances eventually became very popular among the townspeople. In 1987, on the basis of the theater studio of the assembly technical school, Melnik created the Scream Theater Studio. With the performances of "Gaidamaki" and "The Lost" "Scream" performed not only in Ukraine, but also in other countries of the former USSR.

In 1989 Mikhail Melnik opened the theater-studio of the same name in the former Museum of Komsomol Glory named after Alexander Matrosov. It was she who became the forerunner of the unique theater of one actor. Due to a lack of funds, he was forced to independently equip the premises for the theater, make benches for spectators, backstage, lighting and sound equipment with his own hands. Academic Ukrainian theater of one actor "Scream" is the only case when the theater director is both an actor, a screenwriter and a music editor, an artist and a costume designer. Moreover, the actor does not work on a bare platform, but with the use of scenographic, musical, lighting elements of a modern theatrical performance. The performances of the theater have gained wide popularity, although the theater cannot be called mobile - despite its compactness, the Scream rarely goes on tour.

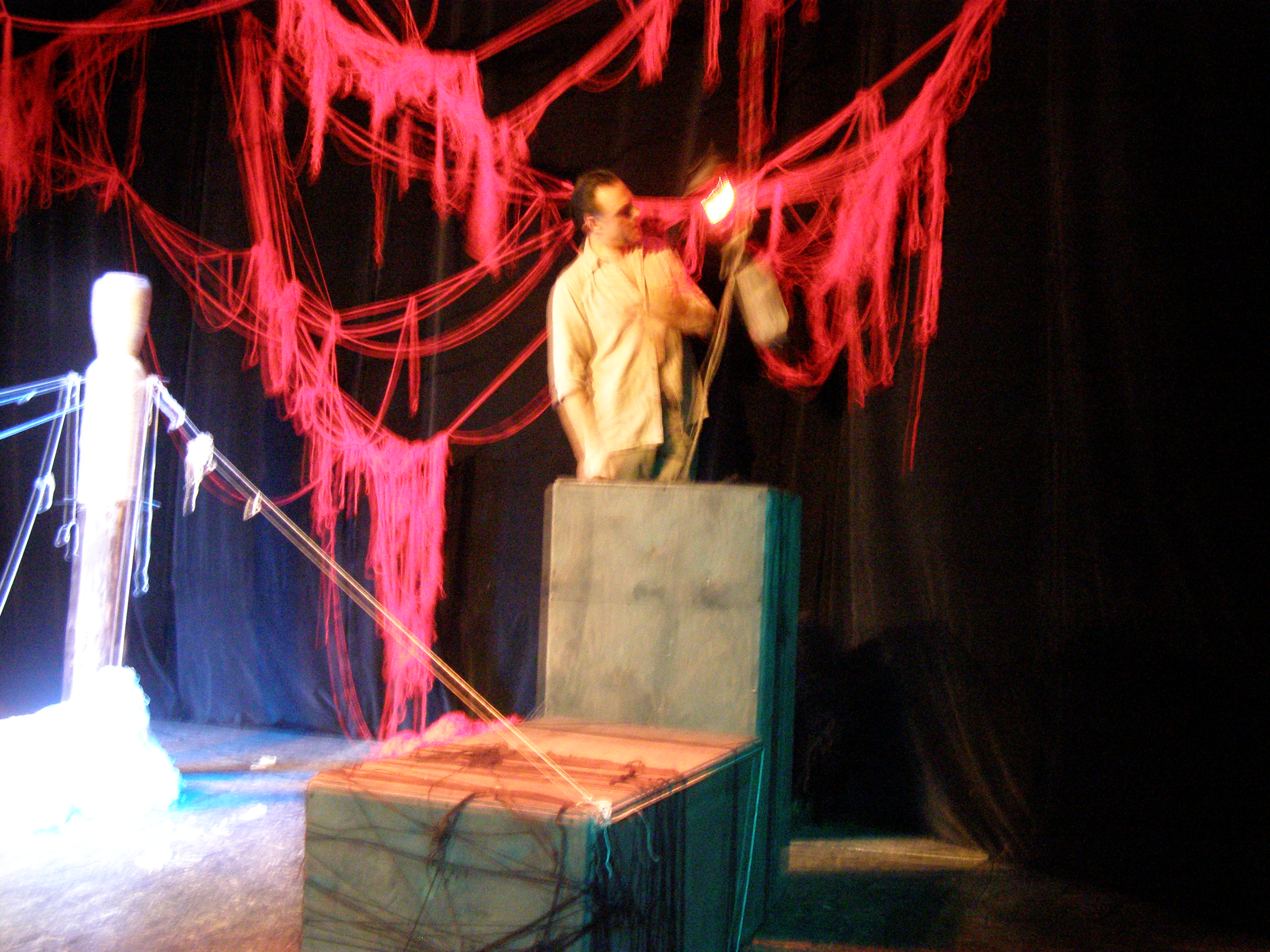
In the play "Wild", November 2017

Mikhail Melnik received many prestigious theater awards for his performances. In the same 1989, Mikhail Melnik received the "Golden Lion", and his one-man show "Haydamaki" based on the poem by T. G. Shevchenko won at the "Theatrical Pridneprovye-89" festival. The following year, Melnik's acting work in the play "The Lost" based on the works of Ostap Vishnya was noted at the "Theatrical Pridneprovye-90". In 1991, for staging the play "Kara" based on the novel by Nikolai Gogol "Taras Bulba", Mikhail Melnik received the Second Prize of the "Theatrical Pridneprovya-91". In 1994, Mikhail Vasilyevich was the winner of the 1st prize of the theater festival for the highest theater award of the Dnieper region "Sicheslavna-1994" for the original interpretation of Vladimir Nabokov's novel "Lolita". In the same year, he was awarded the title of Honored Artist of Ukraine.

In 1996, the founder and artistic director of the first Ukrainian theater of one actor "Scream" Mikhail Vasilyevich Melnyk became the first laureate of the Les Kurbas Prize, as well as the laureate and owner of the Grand Prix of the theater competition "Sicheslavna-1996".

In 2004, for the play "Sin" based on the works of the classic of Ukrainian literature Mikhail Kotsyubinsky "Intermezzo" and "What is written in the book of life", Mikhail Vasilyevich received the award of the Highest Regional Theater Award "Sicheslavna" for the best director, and in 2007 for the production of " Sin" Melnyk was awarded the Taras Shevchenko National Prize of Ukraine - the highest creative award in Ukraine for a significant contribution to the development of culture and art.

In 2005, Mikhail Melnik received the Silver Knight award at the 3rd Golden Knight International Theater Festival. In the same year, by the Decree of the President of Ukraine, he was awarded the title of People's Artist of Ukraine.

Despite his own merits, popularity and theatrical universalism, Mikhail Melnik continues to study even now. At the age of fifty-one, the actor and director undertook to master the art of playing the saxophone. You can hear how Melnik plays at the lyrical performance-contact "The sun in your eyes ..."

A bright page in the creative activity of Mikhail Vasilyevich Melnik was the audio CD "Prophet" based on the works of Taras Shevchenko, in which the actor offers his own interpretation of the most famous poems of Kobzar.

== Scenery ==
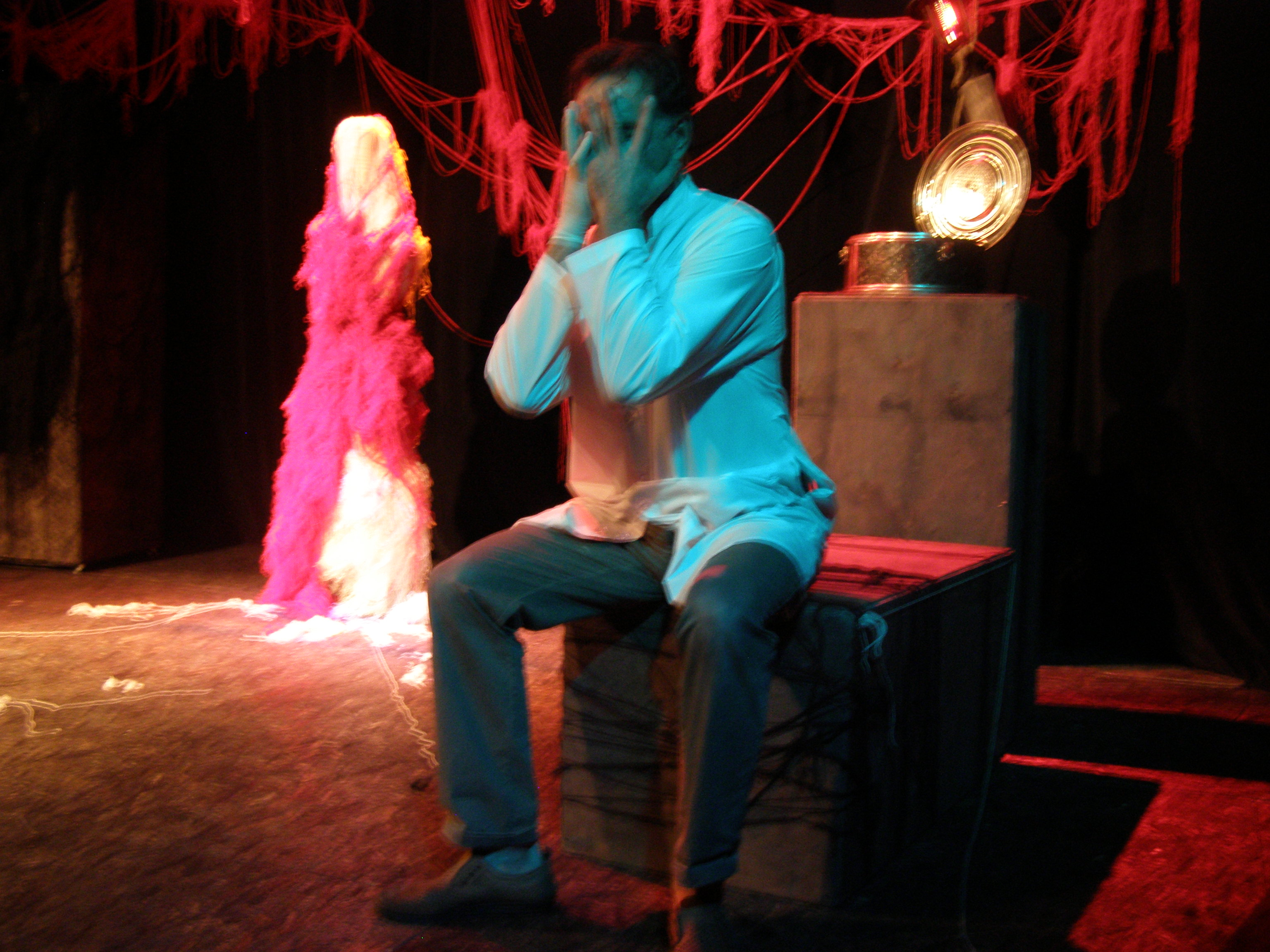
The play "Wild" based on the novel by S. Zweig "Amok"

- "Haidamaki" - based on the poem of the same name by Taras Shevchenko (1986-1993)
- "The Lost" - based on the works of Ostap Vishnya (1989-1991)
- "Kara" - based on the novel by Nikolai Gogol "Taras Bulba" (1991-1997)
- "Lolita" - based on the novel of the same name by Vladimir Nabokov (1993-2009)
- "Perfume" - based on the novel by Patrick Suskind (1995-2006)
- "The Gates of Paradise" - based on the story of the same name by Jerzy Andrzejewski (1998-2003)
- "Ukrainian Hunt" - based on the works of Ostap Vyshnya (1999-2002)
- "Mollis" - based on the novel by Fyodor Dostoevsky "The Meek" (2002-2013)
- "Sin" - based on the works of Mikhail Kotsiubinsky, modern version (2004)
- "Mutation" - based on the works of Fyodor Dostoevsky, modern version (2007-2015)
- "Taboo" - based on the story "Kreutzer Sonata" by Leo Tolstoy, modern version (2009)
- "The sun in your eyes ..." - musical performance-contact (2010)
- "Unrecognized" - based on the novel "Letter from a Stranger" by Stefan Zweig, modern version (2013)
- "Wild" - based on the story "Amok" by Stefan Zweig (2017)

== Honours and awards ==
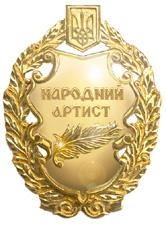
Михаил Мельник — Народний артист Украины

- Honored Artist of Ukraine (1994),
- People's Artist of Ukraine (2005),
- Winner of the Taras Shevchenko National Prize of Ukraine (2007).

=== Theater Awards ===
1989

- Laureate of the 1st prize and the Republican competition of readers named after Taras Shevchenko
- Diploma winner of the All-Ukrainian Theater Festival "Golden Lion"
- Winner of the festival "Theatrical Prydniprovye-89" for the creation of a solo performance "Gaidamaki" based on the poem by T. G. Shevchenko

1990

- At the festival "Theatrical Pridneprovye-90" Melnyk's acting work in the play "The Lost" based on the works of Ostap Vyshnya was noted

1991

- Winner of the festival "Theatrical Dnieper-91" for the creation of the play "Kara" based on the story of Nikolai Gogol "Taras Bulba"

1994

- Laureate of the 1st prize of the theater festival for the highest theater award of the Dnieper region "Sicheslavna-1994" for his artistic contribution to the development of modern national art and the original interpretation of Vladimir Nabokov's novel "Lolita"

1996

- Laureate of the Les Kurbas Prize of the Ministry of Culture of Ukraine for a significant contribution to the development of national art, the search for new theatrical forms
- Laureate and owner of the Grand Prix of the theater festival-competition "Sicheslavna-1996" for selfless service to art in the name of the highest moral ideals reflected in the play "Perfumer" based on the novel by Patrick Suskind

2000

- He was awarded the Order of St. Vladimir III degree of the Ukrainian Orthodox Church of the Kiev Patriarchate for preaching the humanistic ideals of goodness and peace, for selfless service to people and the stage embodiment of Jerzy Andrzeevsky's story "The Gates of Paradise" for the first time in the history of theatrical art

2002

- Laureate of the theater festival-competition "Sicheslavna-2002" in the nomination "Best Actor" for the one-man show "Mollis" based on the story of Fyodor Dostoevsky's "Krotkaya"

2004

- Laureate of the theater festival-competition "Sicheslavna-2004" in the nomination "Best director's work" for the play "Sin" based on the works of Mikhail Kotsiubinsky

2005

- "Silver Knight" at the III International Theater Forum "Golden Knight" (Minsk, Belarus) for the play "Sin"

2006

- Laureate and owner of the Golden Diploma of the IV International Theater Forum "Golden Knight" (Moscow, Russia) for the play "Mollis"

2010

- Awarded with a commemorative medal of the Dnipropetrovsk Regional State Administration "For a significant contribution to the development of the Dnipropetrovsk region"

2012

- Awarded with a commemorative medal of the Dnepropetrovsk city council "For services to the city of Dnepropetrovsk"

== Literature ==
- Irina Solodchenko. "Scream" of the confession of one actor // Kiev Telegraph. - 2007. - April 6–12.
- Elena Nepokora. Actor M. Melnik: “Everything that is built on shocking is a one-day thing and cannot live long” // From-UA. News. - 2009. - December 30.
- Olga Boglevskaya. Mikhail Melnik: “I can't play a hungry person when I'm full. We must do everything honestly " // 2000. - 2013. - February 1 (No. 5 (640)).
- Olga Fomenko. Dnepropetrovsk "Scream", which has been heard for 25 years // Newspaper "Citizen". - 2015. - January 11.
