= Hanna Lypkivska =

Ukrainian theatrologist (1967–2021)

- Born: 18 May 1967
- Died: 24 March 2021 (aged 53); Kyiv, Ukraine
- Occupation: theatrologist

Hanna Kostivna Lypkivska (Ukrainian: Ганна Костівна Липківська; 18 May 1967 – 24 March 2021) was a Ukrainian theatrologist.

== Biography ==
In 2011 she won the theater studies and theater criticism prize of the National Union of Theater Actors of Ukraine. She taught at the Kyiv National I. K. Karpenko-Kary Theatre, Cinema and Television University.

Lypkivska died in Kyiv on 24 March 2021, aged 53 from COVID-19 during the COVID-19 pandemic in Ukraine.
