= Serhii Babkin =

Ukrainian singer and actor (born 1978)

- Сергій Бабкін
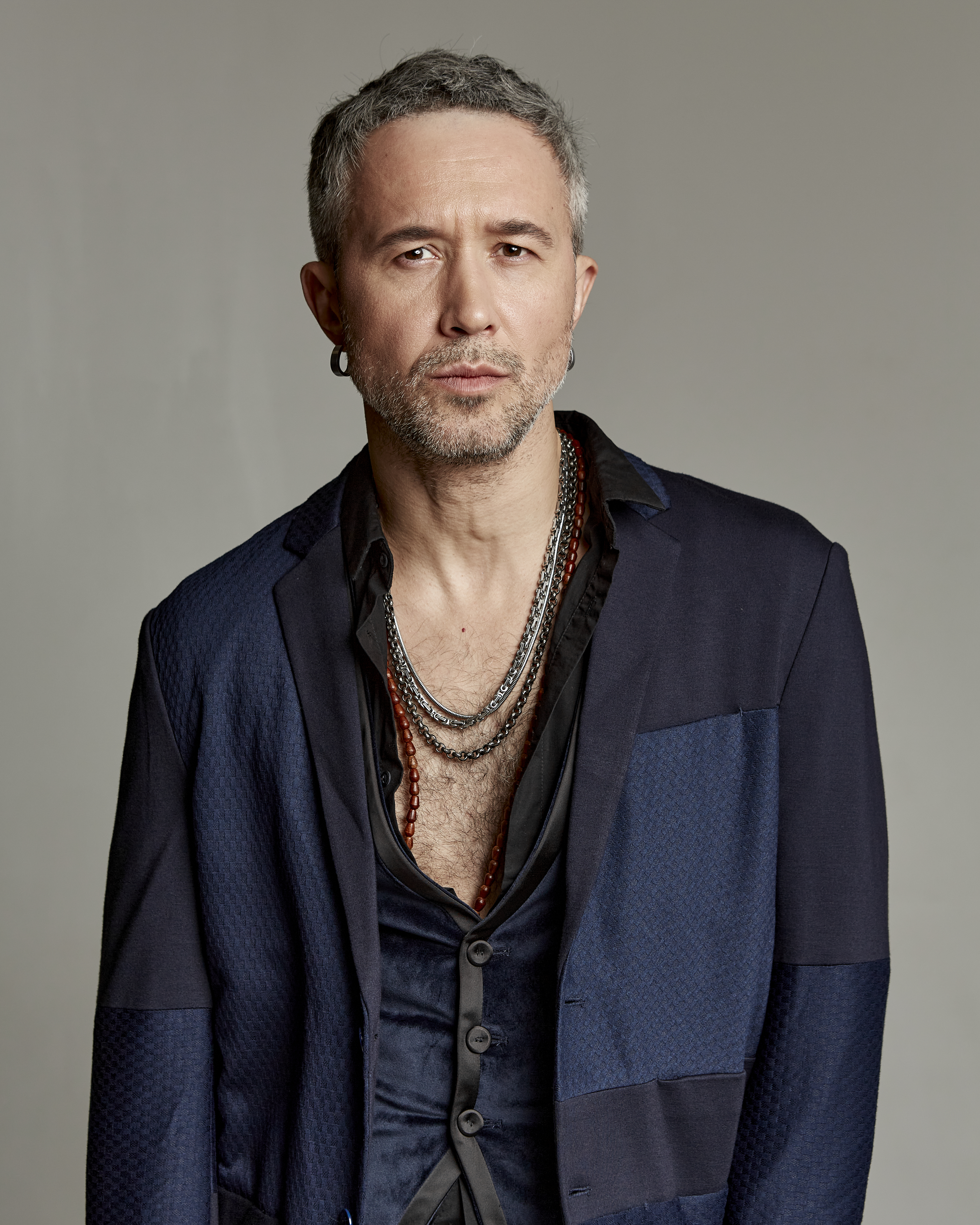
- Babkin in 2021
- Born: Serhii Mykolaiovych Babkin; 7 November 1978 (age 47); Kharkiv, Ukrainian SSR, Soviet Union (now Ukraine)
- Education: Kharkiv National Kotlyarevsky University of Arts
- Occupations: Singer; actor; poet
- Years active: 2000–present
- Spouse: Snizhana Babkina (m. 2009)
- Children: 3
- Awards: Vasyl Stus Prize
- Musical career
- Genres: Reggae; Acoustic; Folk; Hip Hop
- Instruments: Vocals; acoustic guitar; flute
- Label: Best Music
- Member of: 5'nizza
- Website: sbabkin.com.ua

Serhii Mykolaiovych Babkin (Note: Ukrainian: Сергій Миколайович Бабкін) (born 7 November 1978) is a Ukrainian singer and actor who became the lead singer of the 5'nizza music band, the coach of the Holos Krainy (VII and VIII seasons), and the participant in the Tantsi z zirkamy (V season).

== Early life and education ==
Born on 7 November 1978, in the Ukrainian city of Kharkiv. Babkin enjoyed theatre and started going to ballroom dance and figure skating groups at the age of six. He also attended a fine arts school. He attended the acting club at school and took part in KVK, the school's amateur sports program. When he took up a guitar for the first time at the age of 12, Vladimir Vysotsky and the bands Bravo and Chizh & Co. had an impact on him. After completing his studies at Kharkiv Lyceum of Arts No.133 and music school No.13, he obtained his flute major. After completing his education in theater at the Kharkiv Lyceum of Arts in 1996, he initially pursued acting, performing in theaters such as Kharkiv Theater.

== Music career ==
Babkin received his degree in 2000 from the Kharkiv National Kotlyarevsky University of Arts, and later co-founding the band 5'nizza in 2000 alongside Andrii Zaporozhets. The band quickly gained popularity in Ukraine and Russia, releasing albums and performing internationally until their last concert in 2007. He started releasing solo albums at the same time, with the release of УРА! (2004). The second album by 5'nizza, titled O5 (2005). On 21 April 2007, a video for the song I Believe In You was published on YouTube.

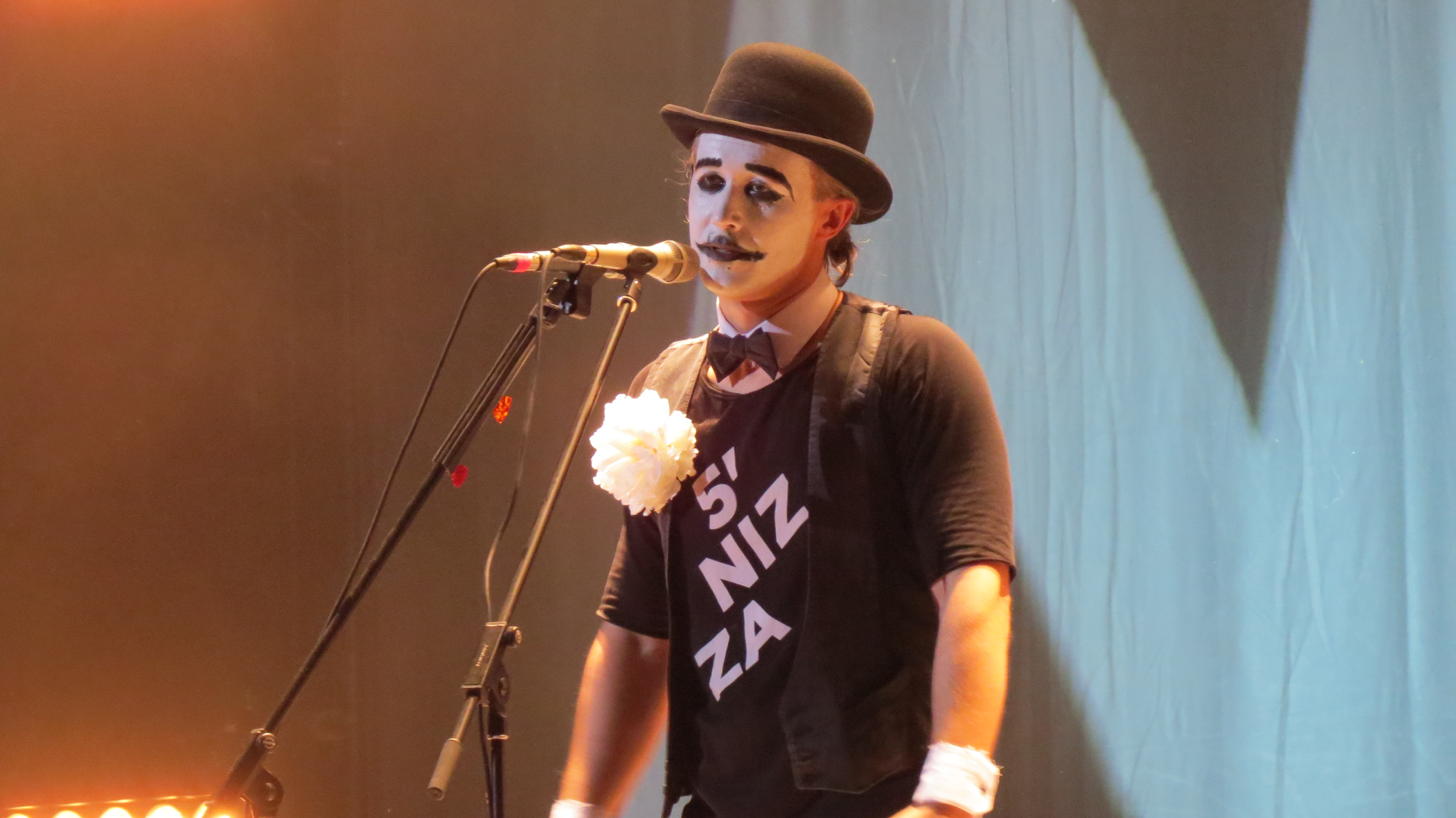
Babkin with 5'nizza in 2015

Babkin formed the group K.P.S.S. and put out the album Свинец under this moniker in 2010. The duo reunited in 2015, releasing new music and performing until 2022. It was announced in October 2016 that Babkin will take over as the head coach of Holos Krainy when Sviatoslav Vakarchuk retired. The debut of the new season was on 22 January 2017. The third album by 5'nizza, КУ, which had 14 tracks, was released on 15 February of that same year.

He published the single Де би я in 2017. It became popular song in Ukraine, and Ukrainian radio stations have regularly played it. Babkin's debut album, Музасфера, which is entirely in Ukrainian, was published in September 2018. Igor Panasov, music writer and head editor of the Karabas.Live website, gave the work high marks.

Babkin recorded a song called Різні.Рівні in May 2020 with the help of several Ukrainian musicians, such as Alina Pash, YUKO, and others. The song is a declaration of tolerance supporting individuals who identify as different gender identities and sexual orientations. The song Спалах, which him co-wrote with actress Olena Kravets, was released in June 2020. In the year 2021, the soundtrack of the television series Джек и Лондон and Сніданку з 1+1.

Following 2022 Russian Invasion of Ukraine, he released the maxi-single Я солдат (2022 Version) featuring fresh translations of the group 5'nizza's hit song into Ukrainian, English, and Russian along with a remix was published on 19 August 2022. October 7 marked the release of the track Face to Face, which was co-written by British Eurythmics member, musician and producer Dave Stewart, Aquarium group leader Boris Grebenshchikov, and British-American band Fleetwood Mac vocalist Stevie Nicks. The song was produced for a global movement headed by President Volodymyr Zelenskyy with the aim of popularizing United24, where they also receives all proceeds from the song's streaming.

== Criticisms ==
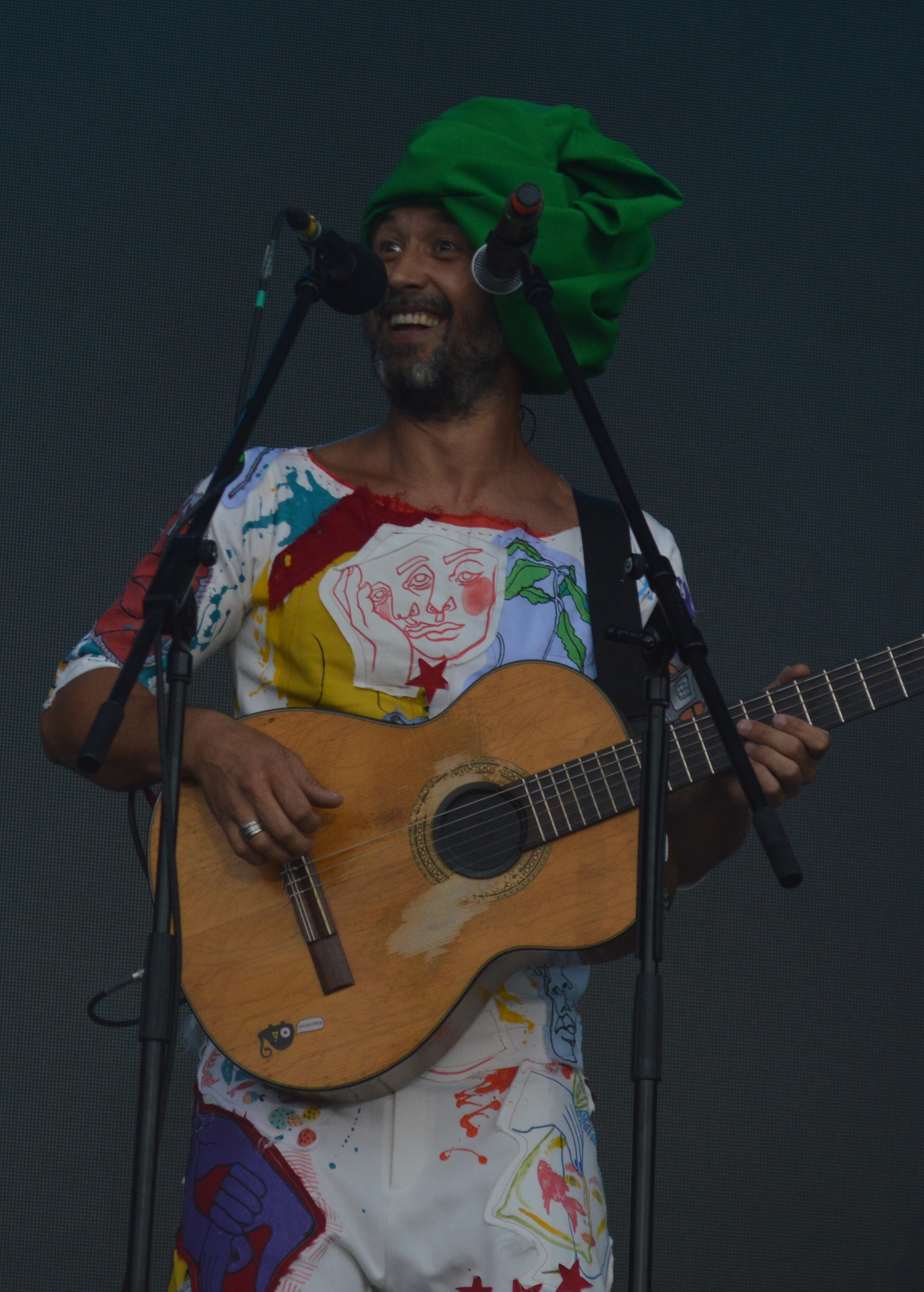
Babkin performing in 2018

=== Tour in Russia and Crimea ===
Babkin's civic position became a topic of discussion, particularly during the Russo-Ukrainian War, with some criticizing his performances in Russia and occupied Crimea. However, he also took a stand against the Russian government's actions and supported Ukrainian causes through his music.

Following the start of the Russo-Ukrainian War in 2014, he actively continued to play both solo and as part of the 5'nizza tour throughout Russia (until 2016) and Ukraine (particularly in the Russian-occupied Crimea). His concerts in Russia and the occupied Crimea, he added, were a win when ten thousand people sing in Ukrainian in the center of Moscow. In Russia, he claimed, he spoke not for politicians, but for listeners. His viewpoint was condemned in Ukrainian society as a result.

=== Fleeing to Germany Amid Russian Invasion ===
Babkin and his family fled to Germany on 1 August 2022, during the full-scale Russian invasion of Ukraine. Based on their own information, the family resided in public housing, was granted refugee status, and received aid totaling 1,500 euros. The kids attended a German school, and Babkins and their nanny departed for Germany. In response to a question concerning criticism of artists who left Ukraine, he said he was doing everything correctly and had no intention of going back because he could not make a living there. There was backlash against this interview in Ukrainian society.

== Political positions ==
=== Russo-Ukrainian War ===
On 14 October 2022, Babkin and Volodymyr Udovenko released a duet titled Пташці. The song, which is dedicated to the paramedic of Azov Brigade Kateryna Polischtschuk, was composed by Udovenko on 29 June 2022, in the wake of the Olenivka prison massacre. José Feliciano, along with Babkin, debuted the traditional Christmas song Silent Night on 23 December 2022. Included in the FaWiJo & United Artists for Ukraine initiative, with Billy Ocean, Status Quo, Gipsy Kings, and other artists, is the updated rendition of the national anthem. The money raised from the sale of this project's video will be donated to Ukraine.

=== Support for the Military ===
Babkin has 127MA as his new tune. Visiting the 127th Territorial Defense Brigade of the Armed Forces of Ukraine in Kharkiv gave him the idea for a song. Since the fall of 2022, him and his spouse Snezhana have been actively supporting the brigade by donating the majority of their fees to it. They received honorary awards from brigade commander Roman Grishchenko in the beginning of 2023 for their efforts to raise military morale.

== Personal life ==
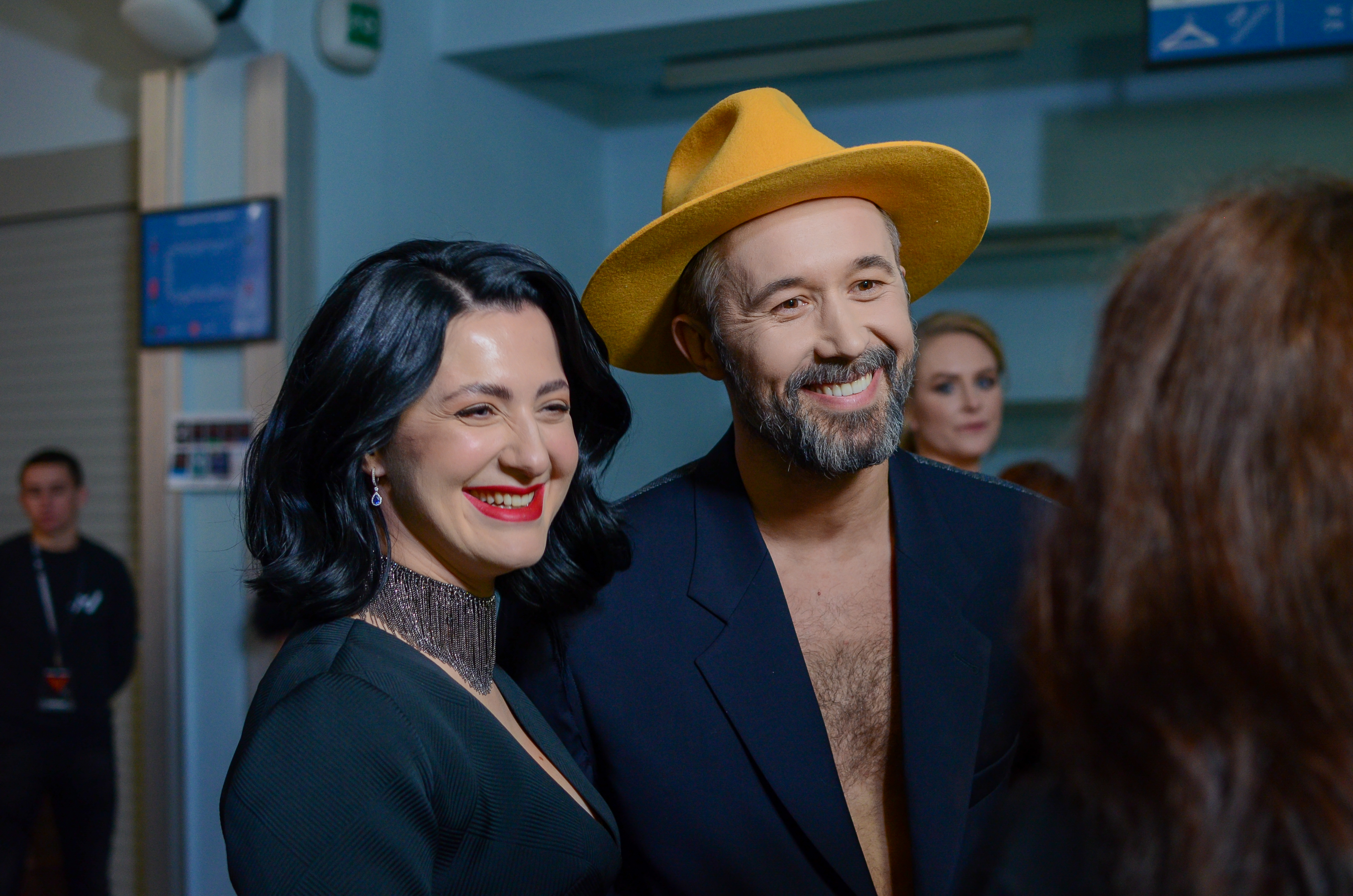
Snizhana and Babkin in 2019

Babkin's father, a retired lieutenant colonel, while his mother, is a kindergarten teacher. His brother (born 1972), holds a position as a military officer with the rank of Major.

Up to 2012, Babkin performed for twelve years at Theater 19, where he met Snizhana Babkina (née Vartanyan), his future bride, in 2007. Their wedding took place on 11 May 2008, and it was officially registered on 27 March 2009. Three children are being raised by Babkin and Snizhana: boys Artur and Elisey, and daughter Veselin.

He frequently states that his family is the most significant aspect of his life. The pair plans their tours so that they are home with the kids as much as possible and try to spend all of their leisure time with them. on a considerable amount of time, the neighbors were certain that Babkin was unemployed since they frequently saw him while he was out on walks with the kids.

== Discography ==
=== Albums ===
- УРА! (2004)
- БИС! (2005)
- Сын (2005)
- Мотор (2007)
- Аминь.ru (2008)
- Взблатнулось (2008)
- Снаружи и внутри (2010)
- STAR'YO (2012)
- Сергевна (2013)
- #неубивай (2016)
- Музасфера (2018)
- Лютий (2024)

=== Singles ===
Year	Name	Album	Notes
2017	Привіт, Бог	Single non-album	
2017	Де Би Я	Single non-album	
2018	Хто Далі Йде	Single non-album	
2018	Крізь Твої Очі	Single non-album	
2018	Дихай Повільно	Single non-album	
2019	Моє Кохання	Single non-album	
2019	Єви і Адами	Single non-album	
2019	Лис	Single non-album	
2020	Спалах	Single non-album	with Olena Kravets
2020	Бомба-ракета	Single non-album	
2020	Твоя Любов	Single non-album	
2020	Because You Love	Single non-album	
2021	Вона Знає	Single non-album	
2022	Далі Ми Самі	Single non-album	featuring Sidor
2022	Я Солдат	Single non-album	2022 version
2023	Непробивна	Single non-album	
2023	127МА	Single non-album	
2023	Про Дні	Single non-album	
2023	Зрада	Single non-album	
2023	Магія	Single non-album	with Snow Babkina

== Filmography ==
In addition to his music career, Babkin pursued acting in films such as Rejection (2009) and Olexandr Dovzhenko. Odesa Dawn (2014).

Year	Name	Role	Notes
2005	It's Russian		Debut film
2005	Феномен		
2007	Radio Day	Himself	
2007	Скарб: Страшно новорічна казка	Max	
2009	Rejection	Young Alexander Dovzhenko	
2013	Як завести жінку	Gravedigger	
2013	Хепі-енд	Mafia player	
2014	Olexandr Dovzhenko. Odesa Dawn	Alexander Dovzhenko	
2018	Me. You. He. She	Bully	
2018	The Grinch	Grinch	Voiceactor
2019	11 дітей з Моршина	Yuzik	
2019	Чорний ворон	Bartholomew	

== Awards and recognitions ==
In 2019, Babkin achieved recognition at the Top Hit Music Awards, securing the Song of the Year (Male Vocal) nomination for the track Де би я.
