= Olha Ilyina =

Ukrainian actress and director (1937 - 2014)

Olha Oleksiivna Ilyina (Ukrainian: Ольга Олексіївна Ільїна; 10 July 1937 - 21 May 2014) was a Ukrainian actress and director. People's Artist of Ukraine.

== Early life and education ==
Olha Ilyina was born on July 10, 1937, in Kyiv. After receiving secondary education, she studied at the Kyiv National I. K. Karpenko-Kary Theatre Institute (1954-1959). Her teachers were People's Artists of the Ukrainian SSR Kostiantyn Stepankov and Petro Sergienko. After graduating from the institute, Ilyina worked at the Chernivtsi O. Kobylianska Ukrainian Music and Drama Theater. At the same time, she studied at the Faculty of Foreign Languages at the Chernivtsi State University, graduating in 1974.

== Career ==
From 1975 to 1977, Ilyina worked as a theater actress and, from 1977 to 1981, as a film actress at the "Moldova-Film" film studio. After that, she returned to the Chernivtsi Theater and worked there until 1999. She created many vivid and unforgettable images on the Chernivtsi Theater stage and performed many leading roles characterized by deep psychologism.

Over time, as a director, Ilyina successfully staged many plays based on the works of Ukrainian and foreign playwrights in the Chernivtsi Theater. From 1996 to 2001, Ilyina was a director of the People's Operetta Theater of the Chernivtsi Regional Teacher's Theater. She also acted as the director of a theatrical and artistic dedication to the 100th anniversary of the birth of the People's Artist of Ukraine Hanna Yanushevych.

Olha Ilyina died on May 21, 2014, in Chernivtsi.

== Awards and honors ==
Ilyina was awarded the titles of Honored Artist of Ukrainian SSR (1972) and People's Artist of Ukraine (1998). In 2007, she received the Maria Zankovetska Prize.
