= Kyiv National I. K. Karpenko-Kary Theatre, Cinema and Television University =

Public university in Kyiv, Ukraine

I. K. Karpenko-Karyi Kyiv National University of Theatre, Cinema and Television
- ДЗВО «Київський національний університет театру, кіно і телебачення імені Івана Карповича Карпенка-Карого»
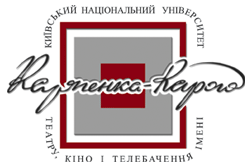
- Former names: Lysenko Music and Drama School (1904–1918); Lysenko Music and Drama Institute (1918–1934)
- Type: University
- Established: 5 March 1899 (registered); September 1904 (began activity)
- Accreditation: Ministry of Education and Science of Ukraine
- Rector: Inna Kocharian
- Students: 1590
- Location: Kyiv, Ukraine; 50°27′14″N 30°30′25″E
- Language: Ukrainian
- Website: knutkt.edu.ua/en/
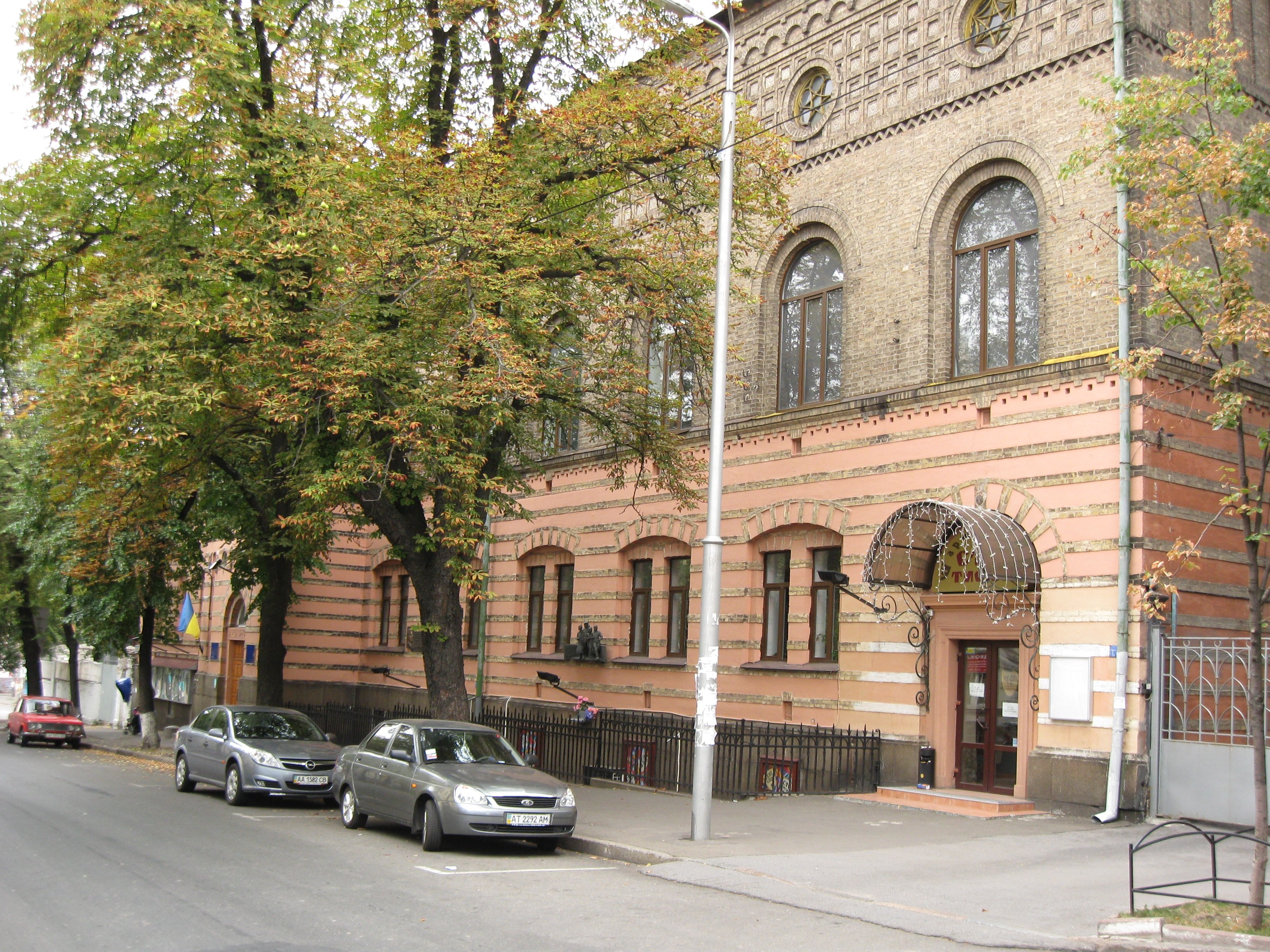

The Kyiv National Ivan Karpovych Karpenko-Karyi Theatre, Cinema and Television University (Ukrainian: Київський національний університет театру, кіно і телебачення імені Івана Карповича Карпенка-Карого) (Note: romanized: Kyivskyi natsionalnyi universytet teatru, kino i telebachennia imeni Ivana Karpovycha Karpenka-Karoho) is the national university specializing exclusively in performing arts and located in Kyiv, Ukraine. The university is a multidisciplinary institution that includes a department of theatrical arts and the Institute of Screen Arts.

The university has four campuses around the city of Kyiv and a separate student dormitory. The acting rector of the university is Inna Kocharian.

== History ==
=== Lysenko Music and Drama School ===
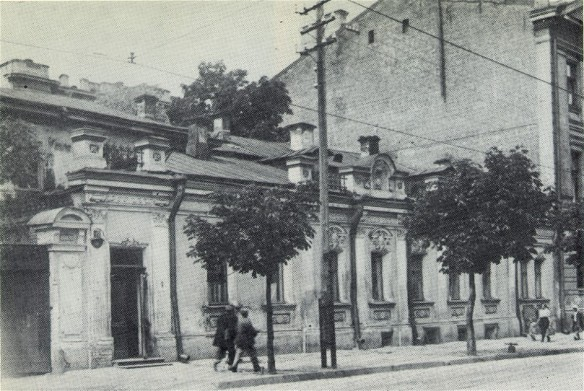
Lysenko Music and Drama School

The institution was first registered with the Russian Ministry of Internal Affairs on 5 March 1899 as a music-drama school, but it only opened in September 1904. On 7 November 1912, the school was named Lysenko Music and Drama School in memory of Mykola Lysenko, who was its first director. The sponsorship came from Mykola Levytsky and Mykhailo Starytsky, a father-in-law of Ivan Steshenko. The school was opened in the building belonging to the professor-psychiatrist I. Sikorsky on 15 Velyka Pidvalna Street (today Yarslaviv Val). Upon the death of Mykola Lysenko, the school chairman became O. Vonsovska, the school's violin instructor, and then pianist Maryana Lysenko, the daughter of M. Lysenko.

=== Bandura classes ===
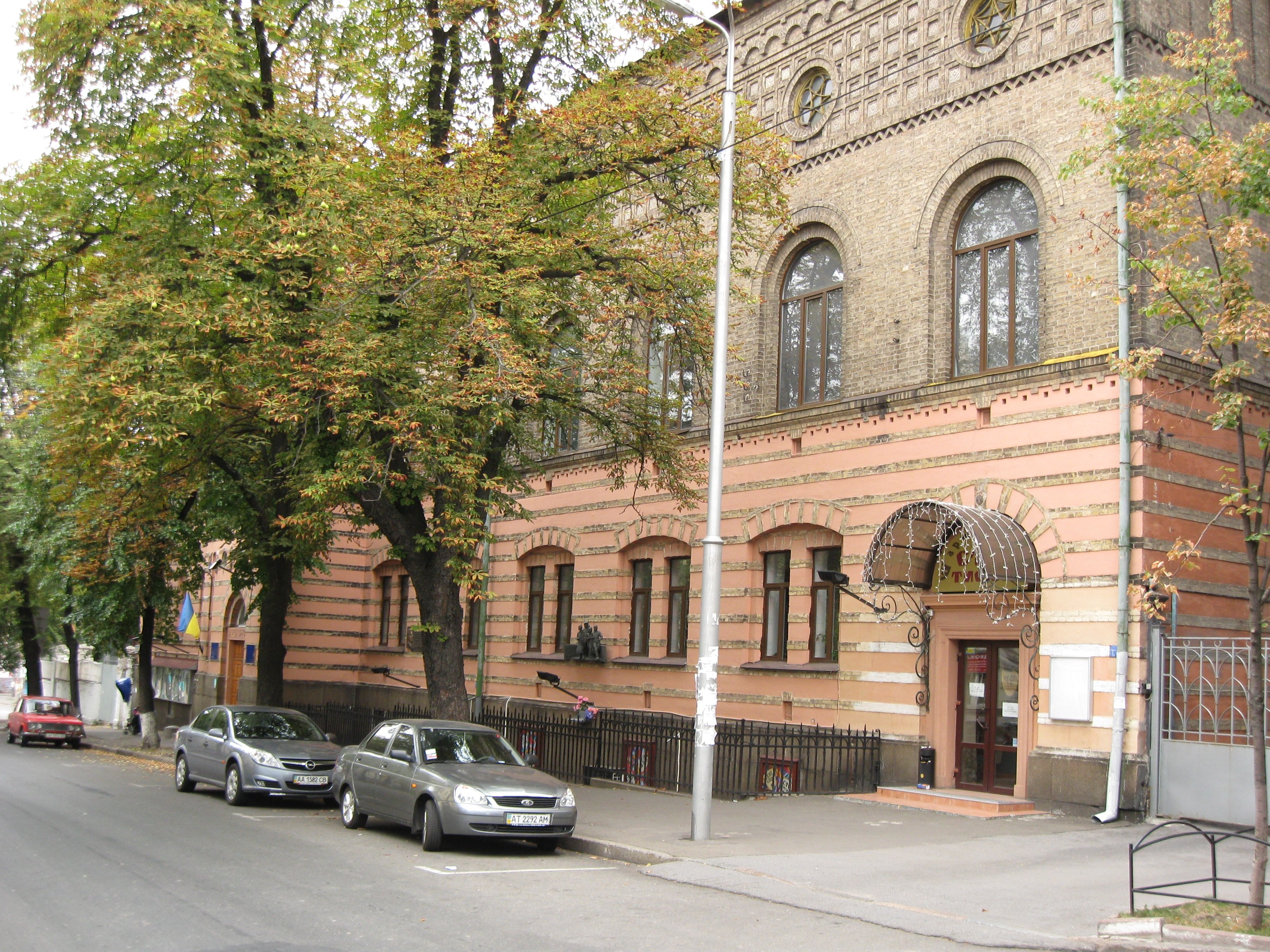
Main office is at vulytsia Yaroslaviv Val, 40

In the fall of 1908, the first classes for the Bandura (a Ukraine-stringed instrument) were begun at the Lysenko music school, enhancing Kobzarstvo culture.

Each of the students paid 3–4 rubles a month for half-hour lessons. Poor students only paid 2 rubles. After the first 6 months, only 17 students were left with 3 financial sponsors. The kobzar-teacher (Ivan Kuchuhura Kucherenko) received a payment of 109 rubles.

In the second half of the year, the group had shrunk and consisted of 6 students (of which 3 were new) and two sponsors who were previously enrolled as students. After 4 months the kobzar-teacher received 38 rubles pay. Consequently, the kobzar at the end of April, not waiting for the end of the academic year left the position and traveled home to Kharkiv.

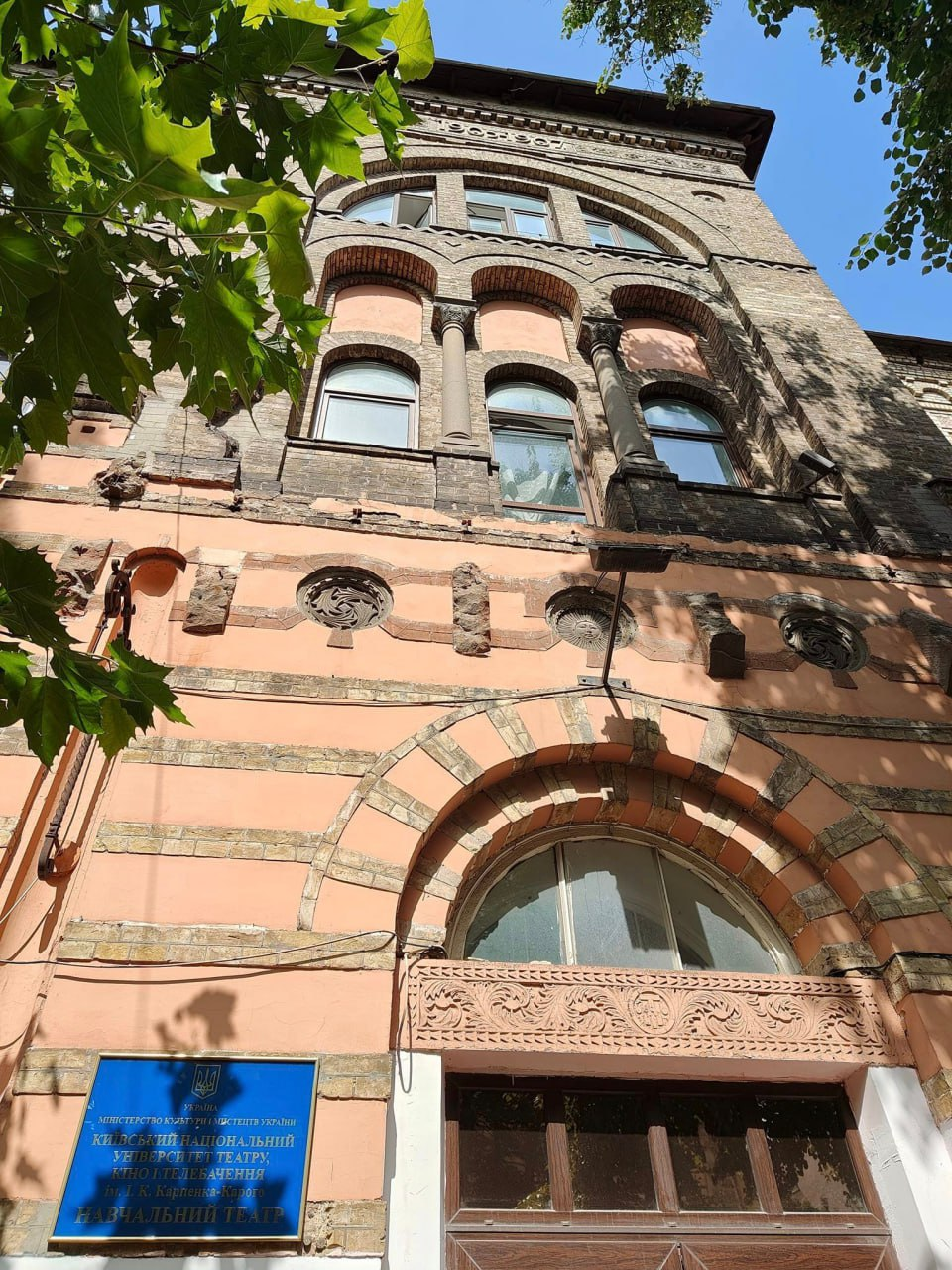
Main entrance

Ivan Kuchuhura-Kucherenko was a blind man and performed according to his feelings. He had no theoretical education, nor did he have any variations in his playing technique. As a consequence, it was difficult for sighted students to follow him. Interest in playing the bandura however, at that time had grown so much in some of the students that they were able to overcome these problems.

The hours in which the lessons were held were unfortunately not very convenient – from 9–11 in the morning – and the students were mainly made up of university students or public servants.

Half-hour lessons were offered, however, having a teacher without a sound knowledge of teaching methodology, and a systematic approach to teaching could not produce the desired results in the students.

Apart from this, there were no inexpensive banduras for the students to purchase.

In an article about the school, the following solutions were suggested:

1. A textbook was required and a knowledgeable teacher was needed.
2. Evening lessons.
3. Stipends for those who could not afford lessons
4. A workshop to manufacture inexpensive banduras.

=== From 1916 ===
In 1916–1917, the theatrical studio of Les Kurbas was opened at the institute. At the end of 1918, the chairman of artistic affairs and national culture, Petro Doroshenko, signed the document to transform the school into the Higher music-drama school of Mykola Lysenko. During 1919–1920, the first rector of the school was Felix Blumenfeld.

Sometime during the Russian Civil War, the Bolshevik government approved the request to move the school to 45 Velyka Volodymyrivska Street (today it is the Palace of Scientists of the National Academy of Sciences of Ukraine).

The school was moved again to 52 Khreshchatyk, a place it has rented from the local municipal administration since 1922. Mykola Hrinchenko was the rector of the school from 1924 to 1928.

The university was temporarily merged with the Russian Academy of Theatre Arts in Moscow during the occupation of Kyiv in World War II between 1941 and 1943.

Many graduates, teachers, and students of the institute did not return from the war fronts. Their names are carved on memorial plaques installed in the 1960s in two different buildings of the Institute: on Yaroslavov Val Street, 40, and on Khreschatyk Street, 52. In November 1943, the Institute moved from Moscow to Kharkov, where a separate State Theater Institute was established, and in the summer of 1944, it was reevacuated to Kiev.

The post-war period of the institute's history is marked by important events. It returned from Moscow with a slightly changed name: “Kyiv State Institute of Theatrical Art”, and in 1945, on the occasion of the centenary of the birth of the outstanding Ukrainian playwright and theater figure I.K. Karpenko-Kary, the institute was named after him.

Since 1944, the institute has been training specialists in the specialization of "theater studies".

In 1961, a resolution was adopted by the Council of Ministers of the Ukrainian SSR to establish a film faculty at the institute to train personnel in film directing, cinematography, and film studies. In fact, in Ukraine, the training of personnel for cinematography was restored, which was artificially suspended due to the liquidation of the Institute of Cinematography in 1938. This faculty was located in the seventh building of the State Historical and Architectural Reserve "Kiev-Pechersk Lavra". Since 1997, the faculty has been housed in the buildings of the Kyiv film studio of chronicle and documentary films on Shchorsa Street, 18.

Since 1964, postgraduate and assistant courses have been functioning at the institute as internships.

In 1965, the institute was given the premises of the former Tereshchenko School of Economics at 40 Yaroslavov Val Street, but the educational process here was established after repairs in 1968. Then, after a long break, the educational theater resumed its work. And in 1986, the institute was provided with non-residential premises for an educational building on Yaroslavskaya Street, 17/22. The construction of a new building of the Institute on Lvovskaya Square, started in 1986, was stopped in 1995 due to a lack of public funds.

In the 1980s-1990s, for the first time in Ukraine, the institute opened specializations such as "choreography," "announcer and presenter of television programs," "sound engineering," "circus direction," and in 2003, "actor of the puppet theater" specialization was added.

By the Decree of the Cabinet of Ministers of Ukraine dated April 18, 2003, the Kiev State Institute of Theater Arts named after I.K. Karpenko-Kary was renamed the Kiev State University of Theater, Film and Television named after I.K. Karpenko-Kary.

== Current status ==
Now in the staff of the Kiev National University of Theater, Film and Television named after I.K. Karpenko-Kary among 188 full-time teachers – 11 doctors of science professors, 27 professors without a scientific degree of doctor of science, 67 candidates of science and associate professor, 14 people's artists, 20 honored figures arts, an honored worker of science and technology, 10 honored artists, three honored workers of culture, one honored worker of public education. 15 academicians, 12 corresponding members and one honorary full member of the Academy of Arts of Ukraine graduated from the university in different years, worked and are now working.

Currently, the Kiev National University of Theatre, Film and Television is a highly professional educational institution that offers training in a wide range of licensed creative specialties and specializations. The university provides educational, methodological, research, and professional training for future specialists at two faculties: theatrical art and the art of cinema and television, offering full-time, evening, and correspondence forms of education. The Academic Council of the university, the administration, three dean's offices, fourteen departments, an educational theater, and an educational cinema and television complex are responsible for organizing these activities.

== Structure ==
- Institute of Screen Arts;
- Faculty of Theatrical Art;

=== University general departments ===
- Department of stage speech;
- Department of musical training;
- Department of social studies;
- Department of philology.

== Alumni ==
- Zhou Shen
- Snizhana Babkina
- Liudmyla Barbir
- Vladimir Bortko
- Boryslav Brondukov
- Elina Bystritskaya
- Olena Demyanenko
- Volodymyr Denshchykov
- Oksana Dmitriieva
- Oksana Cherkashyna
- Maryna Dyachenko
- Olha Ilyina
- Valeriya Khodos
- Ivan Mykolaychuk
- Anatoliy Palamarenko
- Anna Sergejeva
- Nataliya Sumska
- Tamara Trunova
- Mykhailo Urytskyi
- Pavlo Zahrebelnyi
- Mykhaylo Melnyk
- Maryna Vroda
- Ihor Kobrin
- Viacheslav Kryshtofovych

== Faculty ==
- Anna Kostivna Lypkivska
- Vadim Skuratovsky

== See also ==
- Category:Music in Kyiv
- Category:Kyiv National I. K. Karpenko-Kary Theatre, Cinema and Television University
- Kyiv Conservatory
- Lysenko music school
- Lviv Conservatory
- List of universities in Ukraine
