= Unplugged (5'nizza album) =

Unplugged (Russian: Анплаггед)

Studio album by 5'Nizza
- Released: 2002 (Russian Federation)
- Recorded: 2002
- Genre: Acoustic, author's song, reggae
- Label: None
- Producer: Sergey Babkin, Andrey Zaporozhets

5'Nizza chronology
Unplugged (Russian: Анплаггед) (2002)	5'Nizza (album) (2003)

Unplugged is a demo album by the Ukrainian band 5'nizza. It was released sometime in 2002, but the exact date is unknown because it was originally meant to be a demo but was immediately pirated by Russian bootleggers. The album is said to be the most sold album of 2002 and 2003 years in the CIS countries, especially Russia.

Notable tracks are “Солдат” (Soldat, Soldier), "Ямайка" (Yamaika, Jamaica), and the Bob Marley cover “Jammin'”.

== Track listing ==
1. Солдат
2. 5'Nizza
3. Ямайка
4. Сюрная
5. Сон
6. Я с тобой
7. Ты кидал
8. Я не той
9. Стрела
10. Вода
11. Я тебя вы...
12. Весна
13. Big Badda Boom!
14. Нева
15. Свобода
16. Ушедшим слишком рано
17. Jammin'
