= Sergei Dovzhenko =

Ukrainian serial killer

- Born: Sergei Ivanovich Dovzhenko; 30 June 1972 (age 54); Mariupol, Donetsk Oblast, Ukrainian SSR
- Other name: Murchik
- Conviction: Murder
- Penalty: Life Imprisonment

Details
- Victims: 17–19
- Span of crimes: 1992–2002
- Country: Ukraine
- State: Donetsk Oblast
- Date apprehended: May 17, 2002

Sergei Ivanovich Dovzhenko (Russian: Серге́й Иванович Довже́нко, Ukrainian: Сергій Іванович Довже́нко, romanized: Serhii Ivanovych Dovzhenko; born June 30, 1972) is a Ukrainian serial killer. A former operative of the Mariupol police, he confessed to committing 19 murders between November 1998 and May 2002 in his native city. Among his victims are a 12-year-old girl, four employees of the Ministry of Internal Affairs of Ukraine and one Yugoslav citizen.

== Biography ==
=== Before the murders ===
He was born in 1972 in Mariupol. Dovzhenko studied at the Mariupol Commercial College as a commodity researcher. He then served in the army, where he gained the name "Murchik". He was also engaged in boxing, being a former two-time vice-champion boxer in Ukraine, as well as being a private entrepreneur in the market, before working for a Mariupol firm named Citadel. After his discharge, he did not work for a long time in the militia (taking into account the police school and the internship of 10 months).

=== Prehistory ===
On the night of 18 June 1997, when Dovzhenko was already serving in the militia, the office of his former employers, the Citadel, was attacked. A security guard, Sergei Mitchenko, was killed and ₴5,000 disappeared from the safe. At the crime scene, cartridges were found from a PM pistol. Suspicion fell on Dovzhenko. On 27 June 1997, he was arrested in the workplace. Examination of the service weapon Dovzhenko used proved that the victim was killed with it. Dovzhenko accepted help from his brother Valery, the director of a law firm in Mariupol, and proved his innocence. Based on the results of a repeated examination in Kyiv, Dovzhenko was able to prove that the first one was fabricated. During the investigation, Dovzhenko was in custody for eight months, when on 30 March 1998, he was released, but was also fired from the internal affairs authorities for forgery of documents (falsified entry in the workbook). According to his lawyer, Dovzhenko repeatedly tried to get a job, including in law enforcement, but officials continually denied him, allegedly provoking the conversion of Dovzhenko into a serial killer. The former policeman decided to take revenge on his offenders.

=== Murders ===
According to Dovzhenko, his first victim was the former owner of the Citadel, Vladimir Chekmak, who was the first to suspect that an employee had caused the attack in the firm's office. According to Dovzhenko, he watched Chekmak for about a month. On 19 November 1998, Dovzhenko allegedly made his way to the victim's house and put on the police uniform he brought with him in a nearby entrance. When Chekmak arrived by car and opened the front door, Dovzhenko shot him from the edge of 12-caliber gun. Since Chekmak was still alive, Dovzhenko cut his throat with a knife, then turned towards Chekmak's friend, Igor Karimov, whom he allegedly mistook for the head of the personnel department of the Citadel, and also killed him. In addition, the driver Andrei Lyubichov and the commercial director of the Citadel Sergei Shaturov, who were also in the car, were injured. That same night police officers came to Dovzhenko, but they found nothing during the search, and Dovzhenko's wife also confirmed his alibi.

After this, Dovzhenko decided to take revenge on his former co-workers. By committing murder, he hoped to worsen the disclosure rates and thereby achieve the dismissal of responsible police chiefs.

The killer's next victim was Valentina Gladilina, who sold perfumes at a street market. On 17 April 1999, after changing into a police uniform, Dovzhenko met Gladilina at the entrance of her house and presented a fake ID of a police officer. She felt that Dovzhenko wanted to talk to her about a theft in her house and invited him in. Dovzhenko killed her and robbed a thousand dollars from the house. For this murder, Dovzhenko used a pistol, bought from his friend Vitaly Shemyakov. Its feature was the presence of five rifling instead of the standard four.

The same weapon was used in the murder of a militia captain named Alexander Kokin and his wife Ekaterina on 27 June 1999. The mother-in-law of the captain, Galina Krokhaleva, was also wounded. According to her testimony, Dovzhenko was with an accomplice.

Subsequently, Dovzhenko simplified the scheme for selecting victims—he bought newspapers with ads and was looking for offers where it was reported about the sale of expensive things. Having determined where the seller lives and to whom his former colleagues, accordingly, the investigation of the crime scene will take place, he was preparing for the murder, and he took money and property to "feed".

On 10 September 1999, Dovzhenko killed Lyudmila Shevchenko and her son Sergei. She had given an advertisement in the newspaper about the sale of a video camera.

On 13 December 1999, Ivan Vakulenko and his son Vitaly, who were trying to sell a computer, were killed.

On 7 July 2000, Dovzhenko killed his friend Vitaly Shemyakov. Shemyakov, following the chronicles of events in the press, drew attention to the "atypicality" of the murder weapon (a pistol with five cuts). He knew that this was exactly what he sold to Dovzhenko in 1999. Shemyakov began blackmailing Dovzhenko, demanding large sums of money in exchange for his silence. Dovzhenko then came to his friend's house and slit his throat.

On 15 December 2000, Dovzhenko shot down a police patrol. Police officers Alexander Rogovets, Vladimir Fedorenko and Andrei Karpenko tried to detain Dovzhenko while he was hiding a gun in the front of his shirt. Approaching them, he opened fire simultaneously from the cut-off and the pistol, then finished off the wounded on the ground, taking one of them out with a pistol.

At this time, for the murder of Vitaly Shemyakov, a man named Yegorov was convicted. Shemyakov's mother, Claudia Bondarenko, did not believe the physically weak Yegorov could deal with her son. In addition, she supported the version of the press that the killer was a former soldier or policeman. Sooner or later, she may have suspected a friend of her son—Sergei Dovzhenko. The murderer decided to get rid of Bondarenko. On 27 June 2001, Dovzhenko killed Claudia Bondarenko at her home. To ward off suspicion, he staged an assault with a robbery of Bondarenko's neighbours, during which he killed Galina Ivanova and her 12-year-old granddaughter Tanya. Dovzhenko took 3 thousand dollars from their apartment.

On 17 May 2002, Dovzhenko killed Artur Frolkov and Atso Simovich, who announced that they were selling a laptop.

== Victims ==
According to the criminal, the choice of victims was accidental and conditioned by the territory.

Number	Name	Age	Description	Date	Notes
1	Vladimir Chekmak*	48	Owner of the Citadel	19 November 1998	Killed
2	Igor Karimov*	49	Mariupol City Executive Committee employee	19 November 1998	Killed
3	Sergei Shaturov*	Undisclosed	Commercial Director of the Citadel	19 November 1998	Survived
4	Andrei Lyubichev*	Undisclosed	Chekmak's driver	19 November 1998	Survived
5	Valentina Gladilina	55	Businesswoman	17 April 1999	Killed
6	Ekaterina Kokina	49	Businesswoman	27 June 1999	Killed
7	Alexander Kokin	48	Militia captain, husband of E. Kokina	27 June 1999	Killed
8	Galina Krokhaleva	Undisclosed	Mother of E. Kokina	27 June 1999	Survived
9	Lyudmila Shevchenko	58	Businesswoman	10 September 1999	Killed
10	Sergei Shevchenko	27	Son of L. Shevchenko	10 September 1999	Killed
11	Ivan Vakulenko	61	Businessman	13 December 1999	Killed
12	Vitaly Vakulenko	33	Son of I. Vakulenko	13 December 1999	Killed
13	Vitaly Shemyakov	28	Friend of Dovzhenko	7 July 2000	Killed
14	Yuri Granyuk	36	Businessman	August 2000	Killed
15	Alexander Rogovets	36	Policeman	15 December 2000	Killed
16	Vladimir Fedorenko	29	Policeman	15 December 2000	Killed
17	Andrei Karpenko	22	Policeman	15 December 2000	Killed
18	Claudia Bondarenko	57	Mother of V. Shemyakov	27 June 2001	Killed
19	Galina Ivanova	63	Businesswoman	27 June 2001	Killed
20	Tanya	12	Granddaughter of G. Ivanova	27 June 2001	Killed
21	Artur Frolkov	36	Sailor	17 May 2002	Killed
22	Atso Simovich	38	Yugoslav citizen	17 May 2002	Killed

* — Sergei Dovzhenko's guilt has not been proven for these murders.

== Arrest and trial ==
Dovzhenko was arrested on 17 May 2002, after the murder of Frolkov and Simovich. On 19 January 2003, a trial began at the Maritime District Court. During the investigation, Dovzhenko confessed to 19 murders.

On 8 September 2003, the Court of Appeal of the Donetsk region decided to recognize the defendant as guilty of committing 17 murders. Two of the murders - that of Chekmak and Karimov - were considered justified. Witnesses Lyubichev and Shaturov's testimonies were denied by the court. Sergei Dovzhenko was sentenced to life imprisonment.

In November 2003, Dovzhenko refuted his testimony and submitted a request to the Supreme Court of Ukraine to review the case. In May 2006, the Supreme Court, having reviewed Dovzhenko's complaint, upheld the verdict without charges.

The murders of Sergei Mitchenko, Vladimir Chekmak and Igor Karimov are still unsolved.

== Modus Operandi ==
Speaking at trial, Dovzhenko revealed the motives of his crimes: "Almost all murders were committed with one goal - to punish those who mock me. I wanted to punish the elders". According to his version, Dovzhenko took revenge on police officers for being beaten after being detained on suspicion of killing Sergei Mitchenko. In an interview with the newspaper "2000" he stated that they "stole his future", explaining that after his dismissal he could not find a decent job. As it turned out during the investigation, Dovzhenko experienced a perverse pleasure from the murders and was recognized as sane.

According to the investigation, Sergei Dovzhenko acted with mercenary motives, his victims being random residents of Mariupol, who gave ads in the newspaper about the sales of valuables.

According to the conclusion of the forensic psychological investigation, Dovzhenko was "secretive, ambitious, vindictive, possesses the features of a leader, the motive of his crimes — greed and revenge, transformed by internal unconscious marginal and necrophilic tendencies of personality".

== Unjustly convicted ==
For the murder of Shemyakov, another man was sentenced—the repeatedly ill Yegorov. Being sick with tuberculosis, Yegorov died in prison and was acquitted after death.

== Family ==
Married, no children.

His brother Valery, the director of a law firm, wanted to act as a defender of Sergei Dovzhenko during the trial but was summoned by the court as a witness.

== See also ==
- List of serial killers by country
- List of serial killers by number of victims
