= 5'nizza =

Ukrainian acoustic band

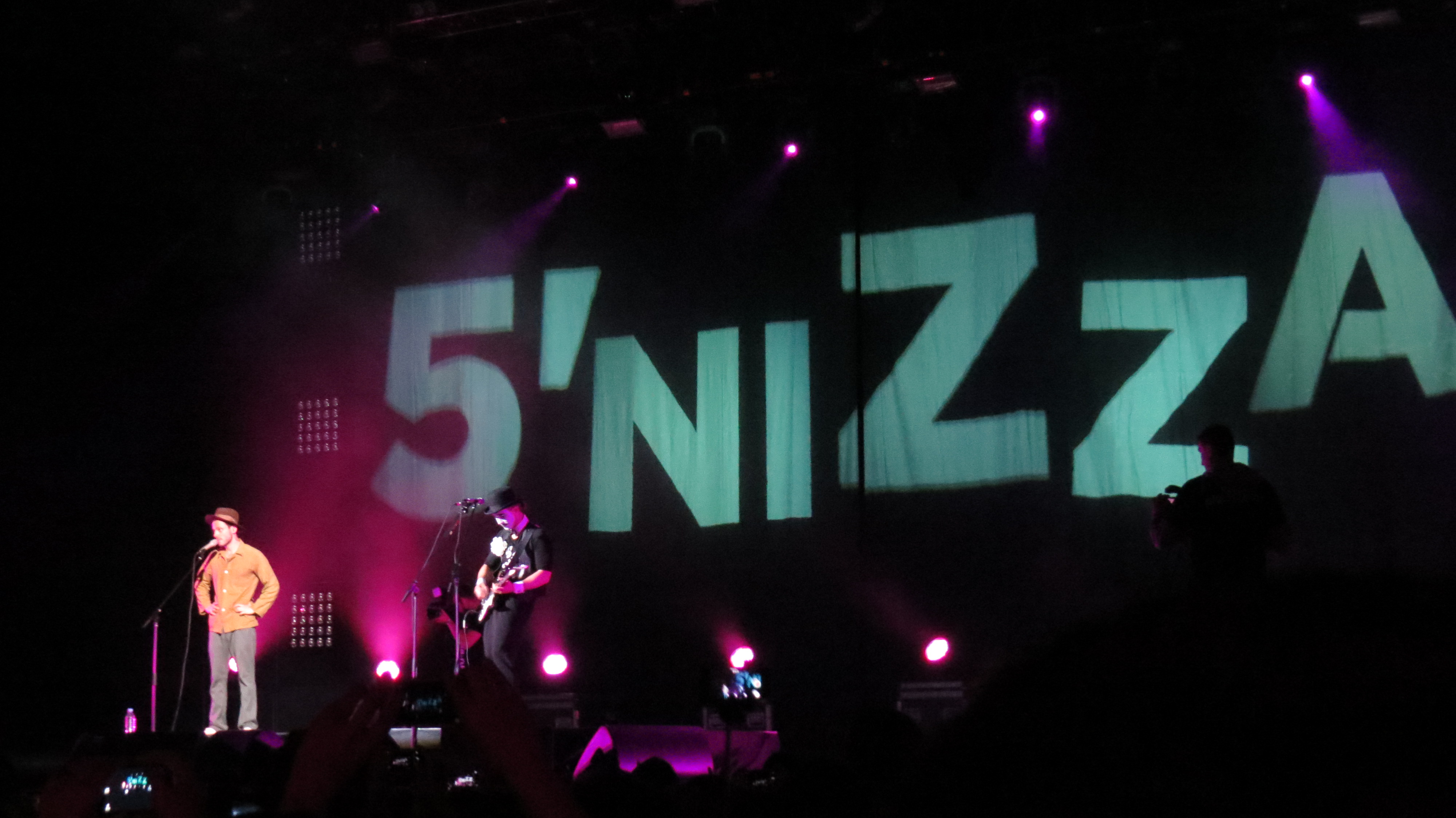
- 5'nizza performing during their "Reunion" concert in Moscow in 2015

Background information
- Origin: Kharkiv, Ukraine
- Genres: Acoustic, author's song, reggae
- Years active: 2000–2007, 2015–present
- Members: Serhii Babkin; Andrii Zaporozhets; Emilij Januševskij

5'nizza (slang spelling of Ukrainian: п'ятниця [ˈpjɑtnɪtsʲɐ], meaning "Friday") is a Ukrainian acoustic group formed in 2000 in Kharkiv, Ukraine, that disbanded in 2007 and reunited in 2015. It is made up of friends Serhii Babkin (Сергій Бабкін, guitar), and Andrii "Sun" Zaporozhets (Андрій Запорожець, vocals).

The band's music has a combination of influences – reggae, Latin, rock and hip hop – performed in a minimalistic folk style limited to vocals, beatboxing, and acoustic guitar. Despite a lack of support from large labels, the group attracted a cult following in much of Central and Eastern Europe, notably Ukraine, Russia, Belarus, Poland and Germany.

5'nizza's song "Натяни" ("Natyany") was sung by contestant Misha Gontar on American Idol, season 16, episode 2, broadcast by ABC Television in the USA on March 12, 2018. Although the judges were intrigued by his Ukrainian rap, he was not invited to continue in the competition.

== Background ==
The duo started working together in 1998. 5'nizza's demo album, Unplugged, was bootlegged and spread all over the Commonwealth of Independent States countries in 2002. The demo was well received by fans as well as online critics. Their official debut album, Pyatnitsa, was produced in 2003 and consisted mostly of songs from Unplugged. The second album O'5 (read as "Опять"/"Opyat'", meaning Again in Russian and sounding similar to "О Пять", meaning O5) was released in 2005.

Both Babkin and Zaporozhets have released other musical projects in addition to their work together. Babkin (a solo artist since 2004) has recorded three solo albums: Ura, SN. G, Bis! and Motor; and Zaporozhets appeared as a backing vocalist in a lounge group Luk (Lюk). Babkin is also an actor in the Kharkiv theater group Theater 19.

== Tour and disbanding ==
5'nizza toured Russia and visited Minsk, Belarus. 5'nizza also visited Lithuania, the band was one of the main guests at the open-air festival Cote of Culture (Kultūros Tvartas) in 2004. The band recorded its third album in 2007, with guest appearances from Lюk and Markscheider Kunst, among others. In September 2007, Babkin and Zaporozhets decided to disband. Their last two concerts took place on June 15 and 16, 2007 in Warsaw and Kraków, respectively.

The third album was instead released as Zaporozhets' new project SunSay. Following the group's disbandment, artists that originally were meant to be guests now became the core of a new group. This added to the change in sound direction, with new ideas and instruments coming from, what seemed to be, everywhere. The few tracks with Babkin's presence (guitar and backing vocals) that reached final production also made the final cut.

== Reunion ==
In March 2015, Serhii Babkin and Andrii Zaporozhets announced their reunion and in April the song "I Believe In You" was released, followed by "Vperyod" and "Ale". The band played the A2 Club in St Petersburg in 2017 reuniting as a trio with "Dizzy" Daniel Moorehead while he was at PGUPS.

== Discography ==
=== Albums ===
Title	Year
Unplugged	2003
Pyatnitsa (П'ятниця)	2003
O'5	2005
KU (КУ)	2015
