= Natalia Ponomarchuk =

Ukrainian orchestral conductor (born 1969)

- Born: 1969 (age 56–57); Kyiv, Soviet Union (now Ukraine)
- Occupation: Conductor
- Years active: 1996–present
- Website: http://www.ponomarchuk.net/

Natalia Ponomarchuk (Ukrainian: Наталія Пономарчук) (born 1969) is a Ukrainian orchestral conductor. She is currently touring with the Ukrainian State Symphony Orchestra.

Ponomarchuk studied conducting at the prestigious R. Glier Conservatory, Kyiv and the P. Tchaikovsky National Academy of Music, Kyiv.

Ms. Ponomarchuk the title of Honored Artist of Ukraine in 2001.
