= Dmitry Ponomarev (businessman) =

Russian entrepreneur (1952–2020)

Dmitry Maksminovich Ponomarev
- Born: June 12, 1952; Gorky, USSR
- Died: February 5, 2020 (aged 67)
- Occupation(s): Chairman, MERA; Founder and President, Volga Region Telecommunication Association; CEO, regional branch of Golden Telecom
- Known for: Co-founder of MERA

Dmitry Maksminovich Ponomarev (Russian: Дми́трий Макси́мович Пономарёв; June 12, 1952 – February 5, 2020) was a Russian entrepreneur and the co-founder and chairman of board at MERA, founder of Volga Region Telecommunication Association, Lintelus, SwitchRay, Signe Networks, KIS, ADS and Nizhny Novgorod Institute of Information Technology (NIIT). Once a professor at Nizhny Novgorod State Technical University (former Gorky Polytechnic Institute), Russia. Dmitry Ponomarev has contributed to the development of the telecom industry in the Volga Region, which is the second largest communications market in Russia. Member of the Institute of Electrical and Electronics Engineers (IEEE), Nizhny Novgorod Polytechnic University Academic Council and honorary member of the Russian Association of Networks and Services Russian Association of Networks and Services (RANS).

== Biography ==
Dmitry Ponomarev was born in Gorky, USSR. From 1974 till 1977 he worked in the Gorky Polytechnic Institute as a research engineer. Shortly after he got a position of an associate professor of the sub-faculty of radio engineering and cybernetics. Mr. Ponomarev's academic experience includes researches in the field of antenna measurement. He is the author of more than 70 articles in scientific and technology magazines and the holder of 12 patents.

In 1989 Ponomarev and his colleagues founded MERA Inc., whose focus was in antenna measurements. He built MERA from a small company with a handful of employees to a global software R&D services provider employing more than 1200 engineers at the time of acquisition.

Ponomarev was co-founder of several organizations:

- 1989 – MERA, a private firm specializing in antenna research and development (acquired by One Equity Partners in 2019)
- 1992—KIS Ltd ("Commercial Information Networks"), the earliest and largest regional Internet Service Provider in Nizhny Novgorod (acquired by Golden Telecom in 2000)
- 1994 – ADS Ltd ("Business Communication Agency"), the second largest telecom carrier in Nizhny Novgorod)
- 2003—PAE ("Volga Region Telecommunication Association", the organization embraces leading telecommunication companies in Volga Region)
- 2004—NIIT (Nizhny Novgorod Institute of Information Technologies)
- 2012 – SwitchRay, the VoIP Softswitch vendor
- 2014 – Lintelus, mobile presentation sharing technology vendor
- 2015 – Signe Networks, Wi-Fi quality measurement company

Ponomarev combined his business activities with public work. He promoted the progress of IT industry in the Volga region and in Russia by participating in conferences and round-table discussions, having held key positions in a number of IT and telecom associations, and served as a lobbyist of the industry's interests. Ponomarev communicated with legislators and members of Government and he has proposed several IT industry-friendly amendments to the Russian customs legislature.

== Publications ==
- Small-Size 6-Port Antenna for Three-Dimensional Multipath Wireless Channels
- Antenna measurements in time domain
- Various scientific contributions

== Patents ==
- Method and system for storing, searching and retrieving information based on semistructured and de-centralized data sets
- System and method for providing voice communication between sender users, recipient users and external network entities
- Method for transmitting information over an integrated telecommunications and broadcast system and integrated telecommunications and broadcast system
