= Anatoliy Palamarenko =

Ukrainian actor and singer (born 1939)

Hero of Ukraine Anatoliy Palamarenko OS, Shevchenko National Prize laureate
- Анатолій Паламаренко
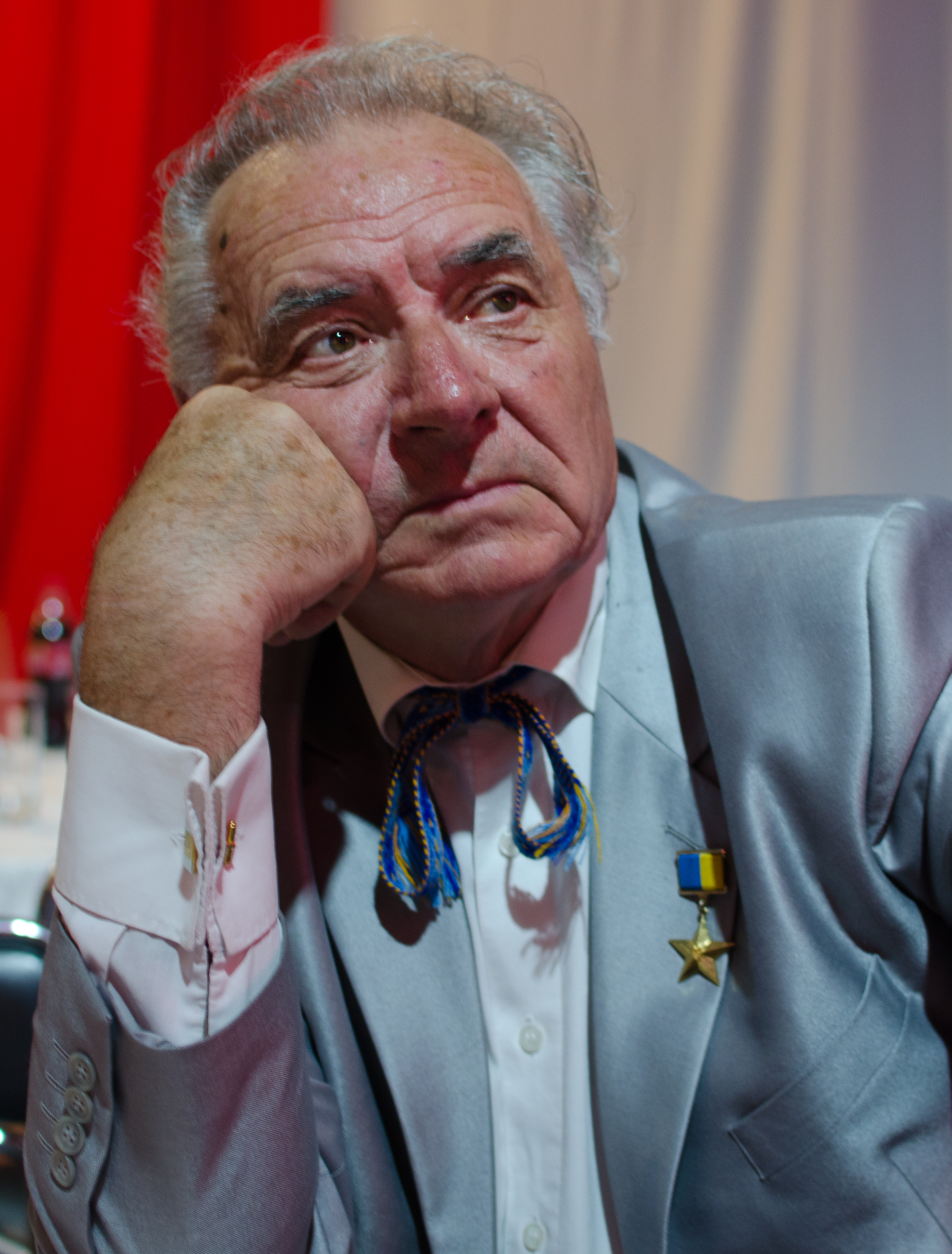
- Anatoliy in 2013
- Born: 12 July 1939 (age 87); Makariv, Kyiv Oblast, USSR
- Education: Kyiv National I. K. Karpenko-Kary Theatre, Cinema and Television University
- Occupations: Singer; actor; professor
- Organization(s): Institute of Philology and Mass Communication, Prof.
- Awards: Hero of Ukraine
- Musical career
- Genres: Pop; estrada
- Instrument: Vocals

Anatoliy Nestorovych Palamarenko (Ukrainian: Анатолій Несторович Паламаренко; born 12 July 1939) is a Ukrainian singer, actor and professor who is the Hero of Ukraine and Shevchenko National Prize laureate.

== Early life and education ==
Born on 12 July 1939, in the Ukrainian town of Makariv. He first developed an interest in creative reading as a young boy after hearing Rostislav Ivitsky's radio talks. He was taught for the first time by Volodymyr Nelli.

Between 10 July 1941 until 7 November 1943, when the Germans occupied Makariv, Anatoliy's father served as a liaison between the partisan unit and the local underground. He was taken prisoner by the Gestapo in the summer of 1943 and taken to the concentration camp at Buchenwald. It was not until the summer of 1945 that he went home. His sister Anatoly Sophia was sent to Germany as slave laborers in the summer of 1942, while his older brother Alexei was drafted into the Soviet army in 1943.

Following his graduation from Bilhorod-Dnistrovsky Cultural and Educational College, he attended Makarivka High School. Anatoliy later graduated as a drama artist from the Kyiv National I. K. Karpenko-Kary Theatre, Cinema and Television University in 1961, and began performing professionally at the Khmelnytskyi Theatre. He has performed as a pop artist with the National Philharmonic of Ukraine since 1962.

== Career ==
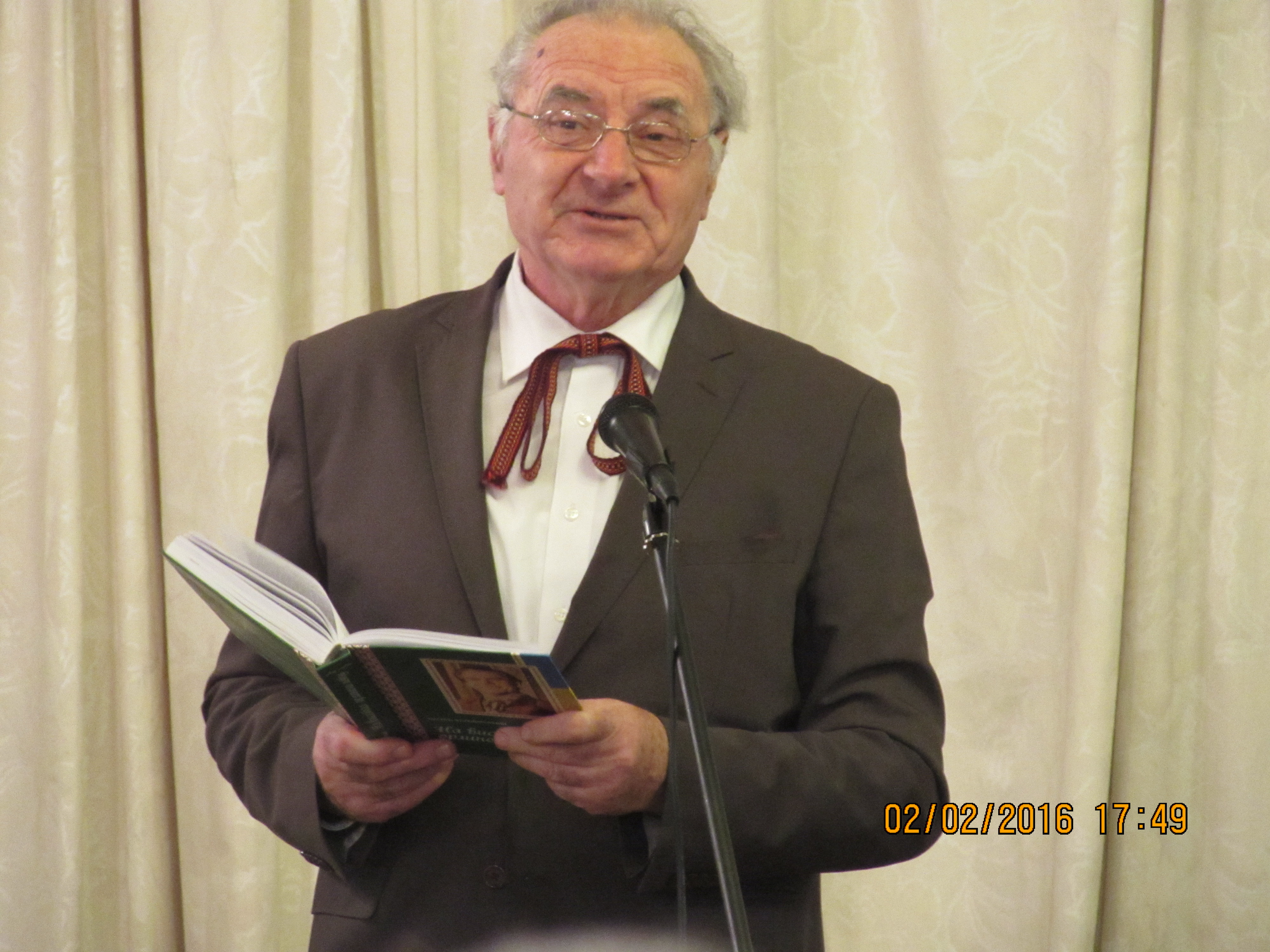
Anatoliy in 2016

Due to the audience's appreciation of the play The Power of Darkness by L.M. Tolstoy, which Anatoliy portrayed as the lead for the following thirty years, it was clear that he had potential. The Khmelnytskyi Theatre marked the beginning of the route for a professional artist. He prepared twelve roles, all of which were quite successful. He found artistic reading particularly appealing at the time, as seen by the acclaim that greeted his introductions from spectators.

Anatoliy was a performer in the Khmelnytskyi Regional Music and Drama Theater from 1961 until 1962. He has been employed as a conversational artist at the National Philharmonic of Ukraine since 1962. Vadym Kryshchenko was initially known to me as a songwriter by Anatoliy, who also introduced him to his poetry. Subsequently, he played Kryshchenko's poetry pieces at the Palace "Ukraine" with success.

The writings of Taras Shevchenko, Nikolai Gogol, I.Nechuy Levitsky, Mykhailo Kotsiubynsky, Ostap Vyshnya, Sergei Dovzhenko, Borys Oliynyk, Yuriy Tyutyunnyk, and other classics of Ukrainian literature have been voiced on stage. The greatest source of inspiration and expertise for Anatoliy was the inventiveness of the Kobzar. The poet's prose and poetry, as well as his correspondence with Anatoliy during a sixteen-year period from 1978 to 1994, point to the creation of the literary work Duma Kobzarev.

Anatoliy voice-acted Ukrainian cartoons, including Mykyta the Fox (2005–2007), Three Ladies are in house (1990), and Three Pankas at the Fair (1991). At the National Philharmonic of Ukraine's 140th concert on 17 September 2003, Anatoliy alongside others performed the Haydamaky poetical-musical performance, which centered on the poem of the exact same name by Taras Shevchenko.

The academic title of professor of the Department of Ukrainian Literature was granted in 1995 by the Academic Council of the Ukrainian Pedagogical University. He joined the International Personnel Academy as a full member, or academician, in 2017. He teaches pupils the craft of creative reading and acclimates them to handling the "Word" responsibly through his lectures.

The Kyiv National University of Technologies and Design Supervisory Board had its last meeting on 27 December 2023. During the debate of the rector's report, Anatoliy, a supervisory board member, referred to the university as the flagship of Ukrainian education.

== Personal life ==
Elizaveta Oksentivna and Nestor Tymofeyovych, communal farmers, were his parents. Anatoliy was the youngest of the family's four growing up.

== Awards and recognitions ==
Anatoliy has received awards and recognitions such as:

- Hero of Ukraine Order of the State (12 July 2009)
- Order of Merit First Class (2 May 2018)
- 25 Years of Independence of Ukraine Medal (19 August 2016)
- Leonid Gavish Prize (2019)
- Shevchenko National Prize (1993)
- People's Artist of the Ukrainian SSR (1979)
- All-Ukrainian Literary and Art Award's Kyiv Book of the Year (2023)
