= Ponomar =

Ponomar is an East Slavic language occupational surname derived from the occupation ponomar (Russian: Пономарь, lit. 'sexton'). Notable people with the surname include:

- Andrii Ponomar (born 2002), Ukrainian cyclist
- Lisa Ponomar (born 1997), German tennis player
- Pedro Benito Ponomar (born 2000), Spanish footballer
- Vitaliy Ponomar (born 1990), Ukrainian footballer
