= Yury Ponomaryov (pilot) =

Yury Anatolyevich Ponomaryov (Russian: Юрий Анатольевич Пономарёв; 24 March 1932 – 13 April 2005) was a Russian cosmonaut.

He married fellow cosmonaut Valentina Ponomaryova in 1972 and the couple had two children before divorcing. As with Valentina, Yuri did not get to fly into space although he did serve on the Soyuz 18 backup crew.

After leaving the cosmonaut corps, he began working at a branch of the Energia Scientific Research Association, but resigned after a few days. On April 20, 1983, he began working at the Central Scientific Research Institute of Machine Building (CNIIMASH). He died on April 13, 2005, from a cerebral hemorrhage. He was buried in the cemetery in the village of Leoniach, near Star City.
