= Yury Ponomaryov (politician) =

Russian politician (1946–2020)

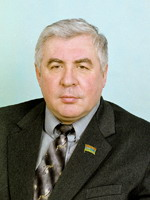
Ponomaryov in the early 2000s

Yury Ivanovich Ponomaryov (Russian: Юрий Иванович Пономарёв; 10 July 1946 – 29 October 2020) was a Russian politician, diplomat and economist.

== Biography ==
Ponomaryov was born in 1946 in Petrozavodsk in what was then the Karelo-Finnish Soviet Socialist Republic. He graduated from the Petrozavodsk Forestry Technical School and worked successively in the Timber Industrial Park and Onega Tractor Factory in Loushi District. During this period, he studied at Petrozavodsk State University evening school for one year. In 1971, he graduated from the Moscow Automotive Machinery Institute with a degree in mechanical engineering, and later served as deputy director of the Onega Tractor Plant and secretary of the Youth League Committee.

Ponomaryov graduated from the Leningrad Senior Party School of the Communist Party of the Soviet Union in 1979, and served as the second secretary of the Petrozavodsk October District Committee, the counselor of the Soviet Embassy in Afghanistan, and the first secretary of the Petrozavodsk Lenin District Committee.

Ponomaryov graduated from the Department of Economics of Petrozavodsk State University in 1995 and served as the General Manager of Pitkyaranta Paper Company.

Ponomaryov served as a member of the Federation Council from 28 December 2001 to 1 January 2003. From 2003 to 2004, he served as Deputy Prime Minister of the Government of the Republic of Karelia. In his later years, he served as chairman of the Karelian Entrepreneurs Association.

Pomomarev died on 29 October 2020, at a hospital in Petrozavodsk aged 74 from COVID-19 during the COVID-19 pandemic in Russia.
