= National Museum of Folk Architecture and Folkways of Ukraine =

Coordinates: 50°21′16.34″N 30°30′44.03″E

- Національний музей народної архітектури та побуту України
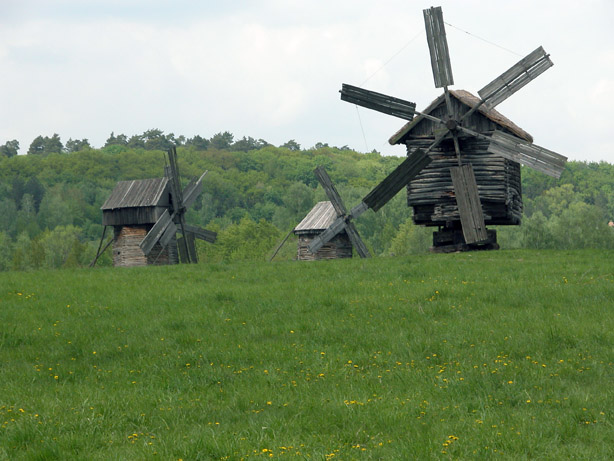
- This ensemble of authentic windmills is the centrepiece of a 1.5-square-kilometre (0.58 sq mi) open-air Museum of Folk Architecture and Life of Ukraine
- Established: 1969
- Location: 1 Akademika Tronka St, Kyiv, Ukraine
- Type: Open-air museum
- Collection size: 300 architectural exhibits, 70,000 artifacts
- Director: Oksana Starak-Poviakel
- Website: http://www.pyrohiv.com/

The National Museum of Folk Architecture and Folkways of Ukraine (Ukrainian: Національний музей народної архітектури та побуту України, romanized: Natsionalnyi muzei narodnoi arkhitektury ta pobutu Ukrainy), is a 133.5 hectare open-air museum located at 1 Akademika Tronka Street, in the Pyrohiv neighbourhood of Holosiivskyi District, Kyiv, Ukraine. An architectural and landscape complex representing the major historical and ethnographic regions of Ukraine, it is dedicated to the preservation and study of regional Ukrainian folkways.

== Location ==
Pyrohivka settlement was first mentioned in 1627, as a feudal domain of the Kyiv Pechersk Lavra, though archaeological evidence at the site confirms that the territory of Pyrohiv had been settled as early as the Bronze Age. The 1720 records mention the village Pyrozhov.

The territory was included within the Kyiv administrative boundary in 1957.

== History ==
=== Foundation under Soviet Authority ===
On February 6, 1969, the resolution of the Council of Ministers of the Ukrainian SSR No. 105 "On the establishment of the State Museum of Folk Architecture and Life of the Ukrainian SSR" was adopted. This was preceded by a number of public initiatives, controversial in their time, and in particular, the publication of an open letter from architect S. Verhovsky, along with well-known Ukrainian figures of science and culture anxious to maintain the life of regional Ukrainian culture. The government program, approved by the party leadership of the Ukrainian SSR, was developed on the initiative and partial participation of the then Deputy Chairman of the Council of Ministers of the Ukrainian SSR (1961–1978), the head of the Ukrainian Society named after Preservation of Historical and Cultural Monuments (1967–1988, hereinafter: Society) Petro Timofiyovych Tronko (1915–2011), who is considered the founder of the museum.

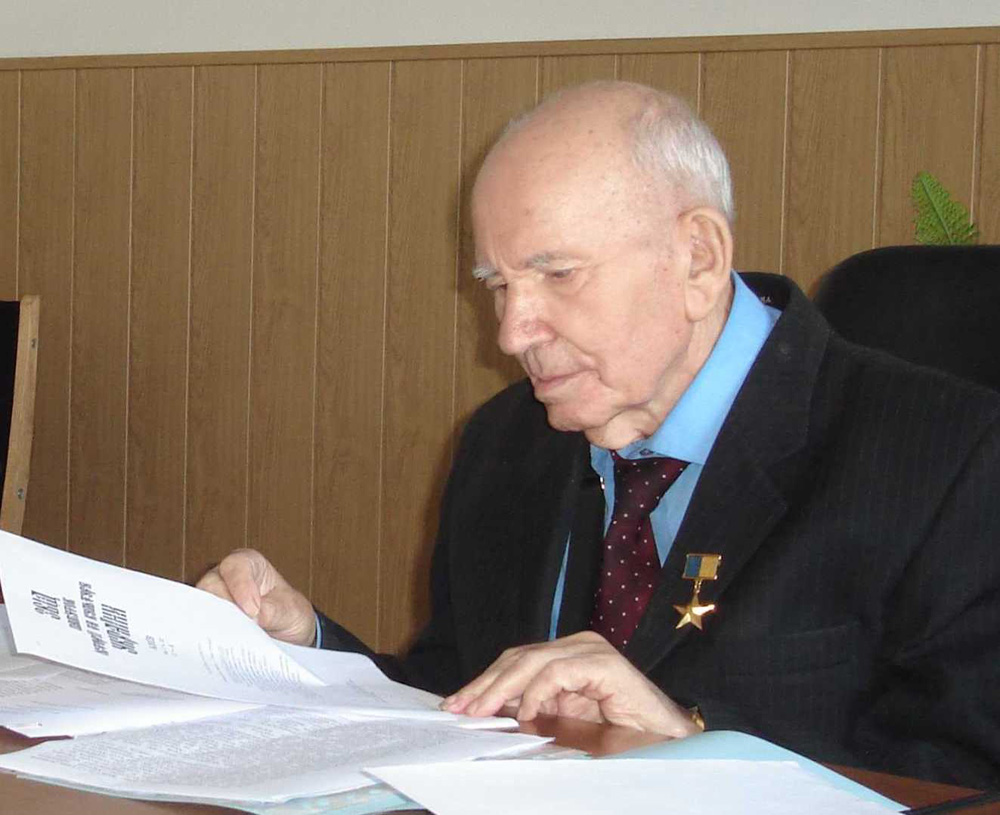
Petro Tronko (n.d.)

In his memoirs, the Chairman of the Council of Ministers of the Ukrainian SSR O. Lyashko called Tronko not only the initiator, but also the soul of the creation of the museum. Tronko personally chose the location of the museum and ensured land acquisition. The location for the museum was based on the following postulates:

- Preservation and reproduction of traditional Ukraine
- Popularization of folk crafts and handicrafts
- Research of folk art through the historical and ethnographic regions of Ukraine, with particular focus on the Middle Dnieper region (Slobozhanshchyna, Polissia, Podillia, Carpathians, Southern Architecture of Ukraine)

Within the museum's grounds, regions would be placed according to geographical specificity in the corresponding ethnographic, landscape and natural zones.

=== Administration via the Ukrainian Society for the Protection of Historical and Cultural Monuments ===
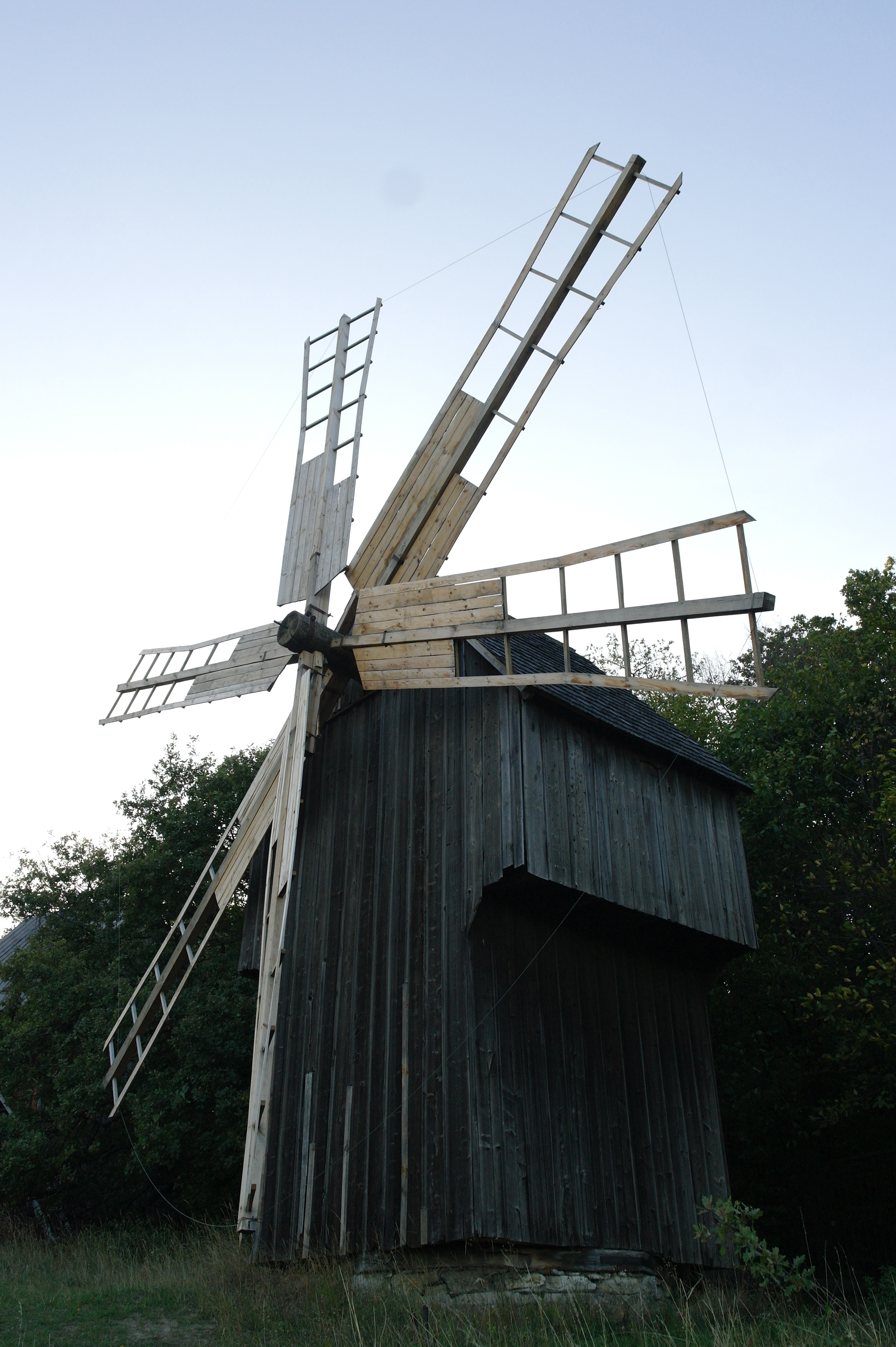
Windmill, Pyrohiv

Until 1971, the museum remained under the administration of the Ministry of Culture of Ukraine. The resolution of the Council of Ministers of the Ukrainian SSR dated March 31, 1971 No. 159, transferred Pyrohiv to the administration of the Ukrainian Society for the Protection of Historical and Cultural Monuments. These years can be called the most fruitful in the work of creating the museum and expanding its exposition, although museum staff had to overcome difficulties related not only to the selection of exhibits, but also to party intrigues and misunderstandings regarding the extent of the restoration that would be necessary to reconstitute many of these fragile historic buildings. Tronko, in an interview, described some of these issues:

"It so happened that in order to create an exhibit, a dismantled windmill was taken in a truck along Ordzhonikidze Street, past the building of the Central Committee of the Communist Party of Ukraine. Perhaps Volodymyr Vasyliovych Shcherbytskyi saw it from the window, or, most likely, 'well-wishers" reported on the collection of the Patriarchate. The first secretary of the Central Committee called me and said: "Petro Tymofiyovych, what are you carrying junk there? I calmly answered him: "You will thank me for this junk one day."

Dismantling, conservation, transportation, restoration and installation on the site of monuments of folk architecture (houses (khaty), farm buildings, wooden churches, windmills, etc.) required the creation of specialized restoration workshops, which were created by the Society under the rights of its structural division.

The museum staff, with the active participation of the activists of the regional organizations of the Society, conducted a search and collection of valuable monuments of ethnography, decorative and applied art, folk clothes, furniture, wooden and earthenware, men's and women's clothes, musical instruments, etc. These efforts added an additional ~700 object to the museum collection, which were temporarily housed in Kyiv's main museum complex at the Kyiv-Pechersk Lavra, building 19 at 21 Sichovoho Povstannia St, (now Lavrska), at the time of the former church on St. f. Engels (now Luteranska), in auxiliary buildings on the territory of the museum complex.

The museum was opened to visitors in 1976. The Society continued to finance the activities of the museum and the restoration workshop until 1989, when the museum was transferred to a branch of the Academy of Sciences of Ukraine, and later to the Ministry of Sciences and Cultures of Ukraine.

=== Ukrainian Independence ===
On July 5, 2004, in accordance with the order of the Cabinet of Ministers of Ukraine dated July 21, 2008 No. 417, the museum was transferred to the National Academy of Sciences of Ukraine. Viktor Yushchenko, by his Decree No. 644/2008, advanced the museum to National status within the Ukrainian museum organizational hierarchy during period. The documentation regulating the activities of the museum, in particular the Statute, was approved by the order of the Presidium of the National Academy of Sciences of Ukraine dated May 14, 2009 No. 305, and on June 2 the new Statute was legally registered.

== Collection ==
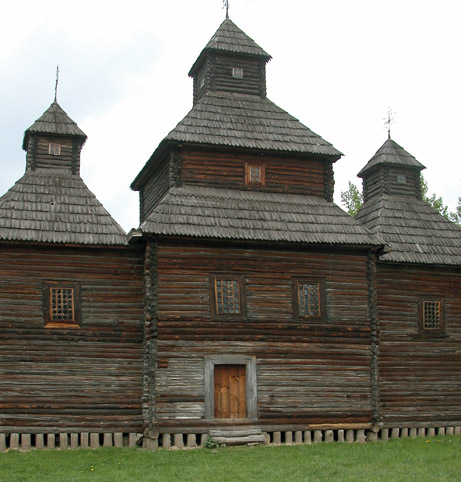
Wooden church at the Pyrohiv Museum

The museum contains over 300 pieces of folk architecture from all major regions of Ukraine and carefully reassembled. The collection includes 40 000 items of household and traditional culture such as costumes, old textiles, embroidery, carpets, ceramics, metal handicrafts, woodwork and glassware as well as musical instruments, paintings and houseware.

The museum's plan divided its grounds into several functional zones: the exposition area, where the monuments of ethnography and monuments of traditional folk architecture were located; ethnographic-scientific, including exhibition pavilions, a restaurant with approximately 300 seats, a singing field for 10,000 spectators, the research institute of ethnographic museology of the Academy of Sciences of Ukraine; and industrial, including workshops for restoration work.

=== Exposition Area ===
==== Windmill Hill ====
The picturesque hill with several windmills is the museum centerpiece and the entire territory of the museum is divided into sectors, each representing the folk architecture and life of a specific Ukrainian region.

==== Naddniprianska Church ====
The oldest church is the Naddniprianska Church, built in 1742.

==== Vernacular Constructions ====
Commoner's homes, buildings of small trade, commerce and local administration, and old wooden village churches contain authentic items that represent the everyday lifestyle of Ukrainian villagers and townsfolk. Local volunteers and modern Ukrainian artisans selling their wares dress in old-style clothes and demonstrating the use of authentic everyday items to visitors.

=== Cultural-Ethnographic ===
One of the distinctive features of the museum is its theatrical performances and open-air celebrations dedicated to different folk holidays. Also in Pyrohiv, you can often meet workers of the museum and visitors who are dressed in national costumes as well as those who are participating in ancient crafts like weaving, molding and others. In autumn and in summer holidays folk crafts take place here. Blacksmiths, potters, weavers and other masters show their crafts to the public and create works of art in front of your eyes.

Pyrohiv museum has been accorded the status of the State Museum of Ukraine and is affiliated with the Institute of Arts, Folklore and Ethnology of the National Academy of Science of Ukraine.

To get to the museum from the underground station Demiivska take the trolley bus №11 or from the underground station Demiivska or Golosiivska the minibus taxi №172 and 156. The museum’s working hours are from 10 a.m. to 5 p.m. There are excursions for tourists in English, Ukrainian, Russian and German.

== Controversies ==
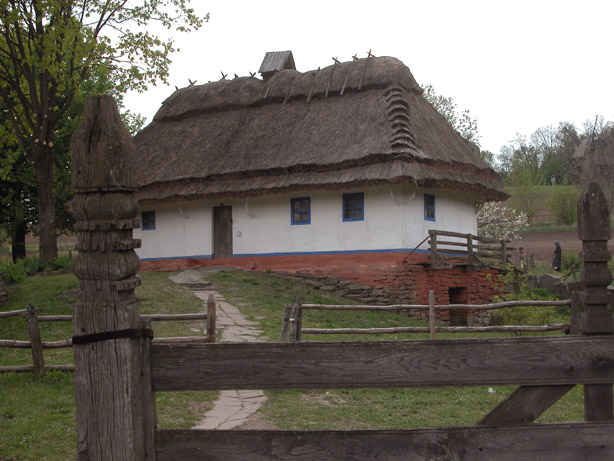
Fire safety is a significant concern as most of the museum's structures are wooden, and many houses have thatched roofs.

In the 2000s, several of the museum's wooden buildings have been damaged by fires. The fire of 15 September 2006 completely destroyed one house and seriously damaged two others. According to then Institute Director Hanna Skrypnyk and the Ukrainian Ministry of Emergencies, the fire was the result of arson, set to cover up the theft of a valuable collection of eighteenth-century cassoni which were exhibited in the burned building. Skrypnyk noted that in Soviet times the museum had a designated security group and fire house, which were disbanded after the Soviet collapse owing to negligence in financing on the part of the Ukrainian government.

The land usage in the vicinity of the museum has become the centre of scandal as the local authorities approved several commercial construction projects, including a luxurious high-rise entertainment complex and a gasoline filling station. The construction work for the former is now stalled due to public outrage, but the work on building the filling station near the museum entrance has proceeded.

== Gallery ==
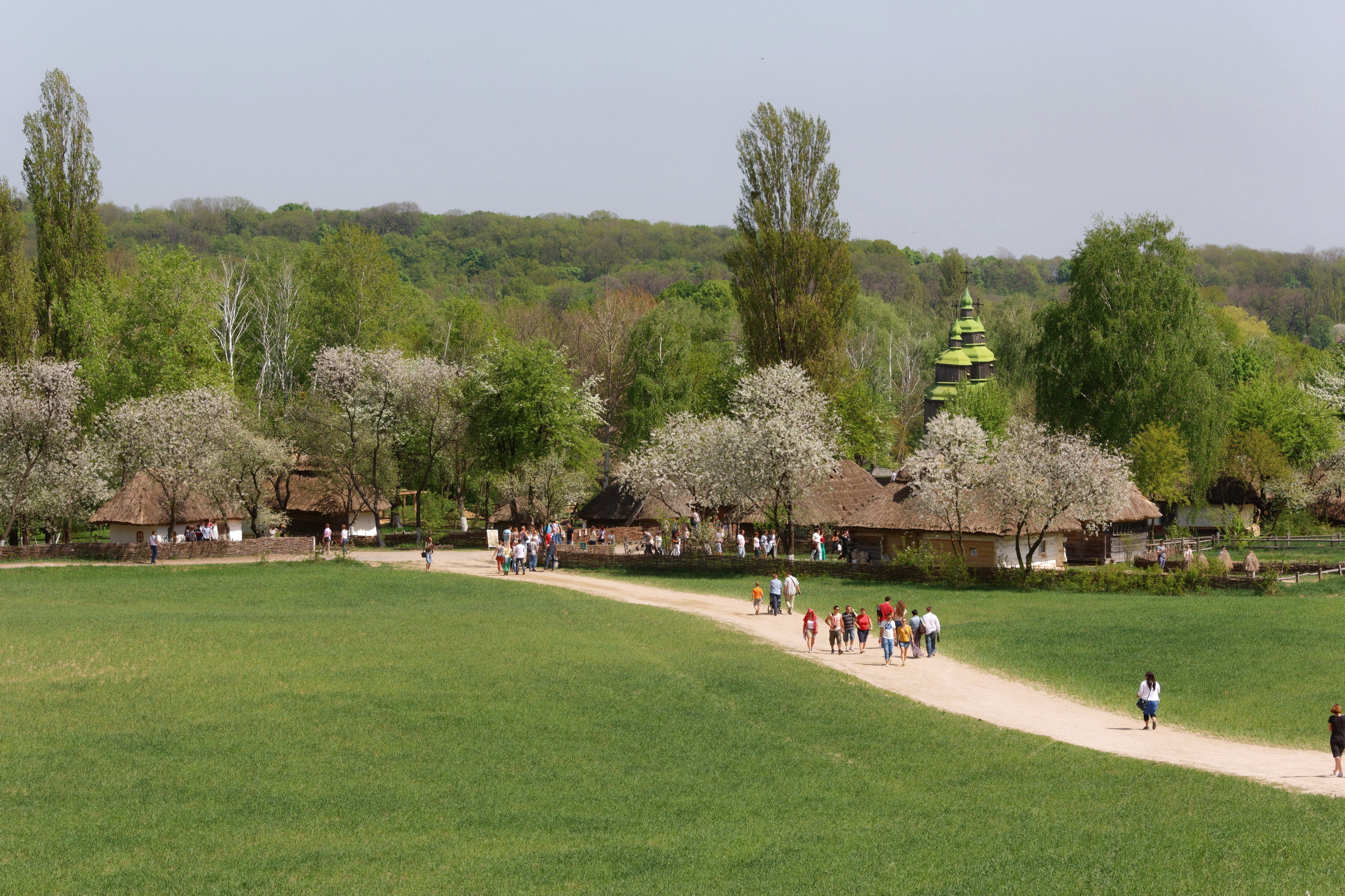
Pyrohiv Folkways Museum

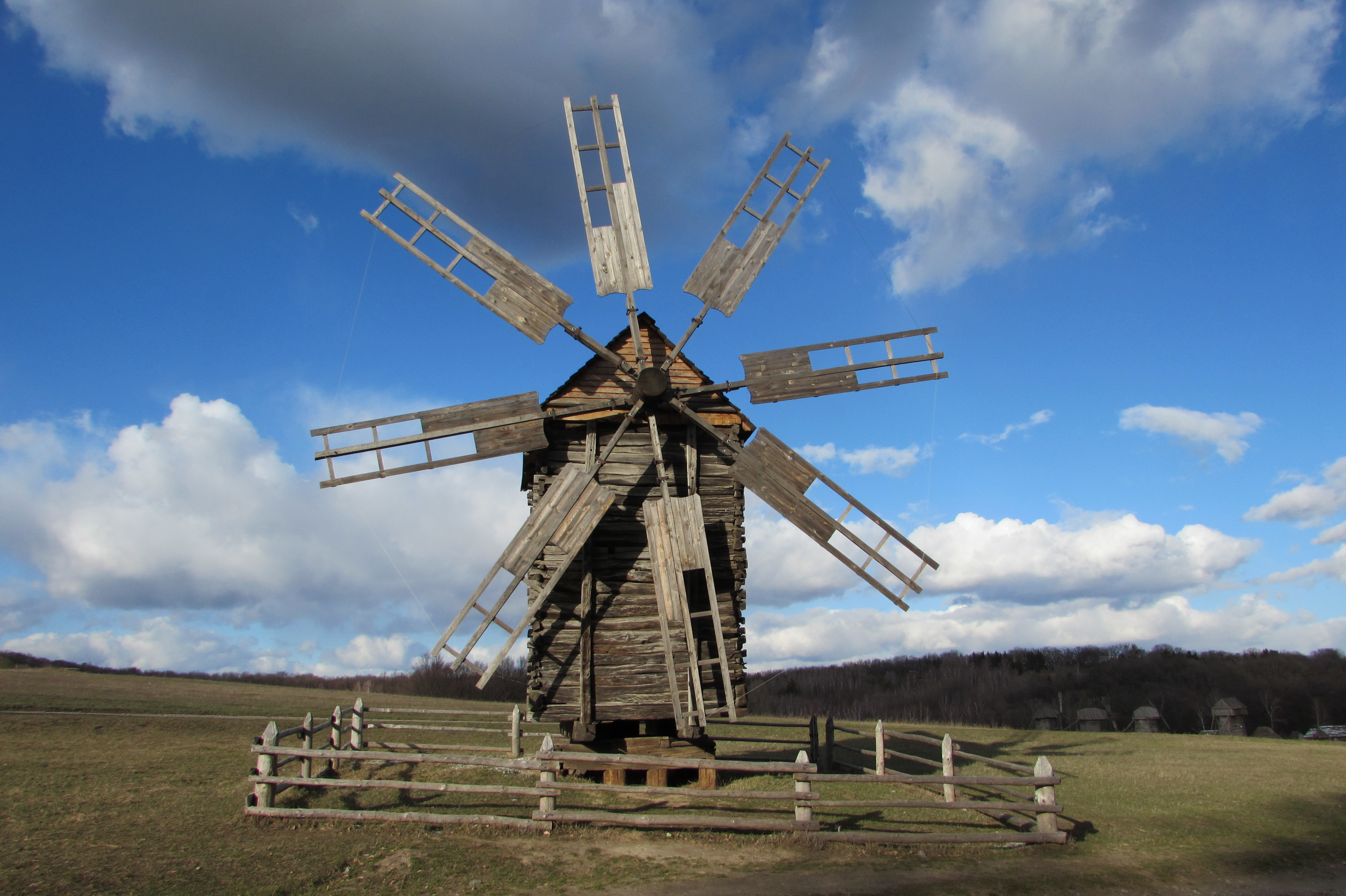
Windmill (Sumy Oblast)

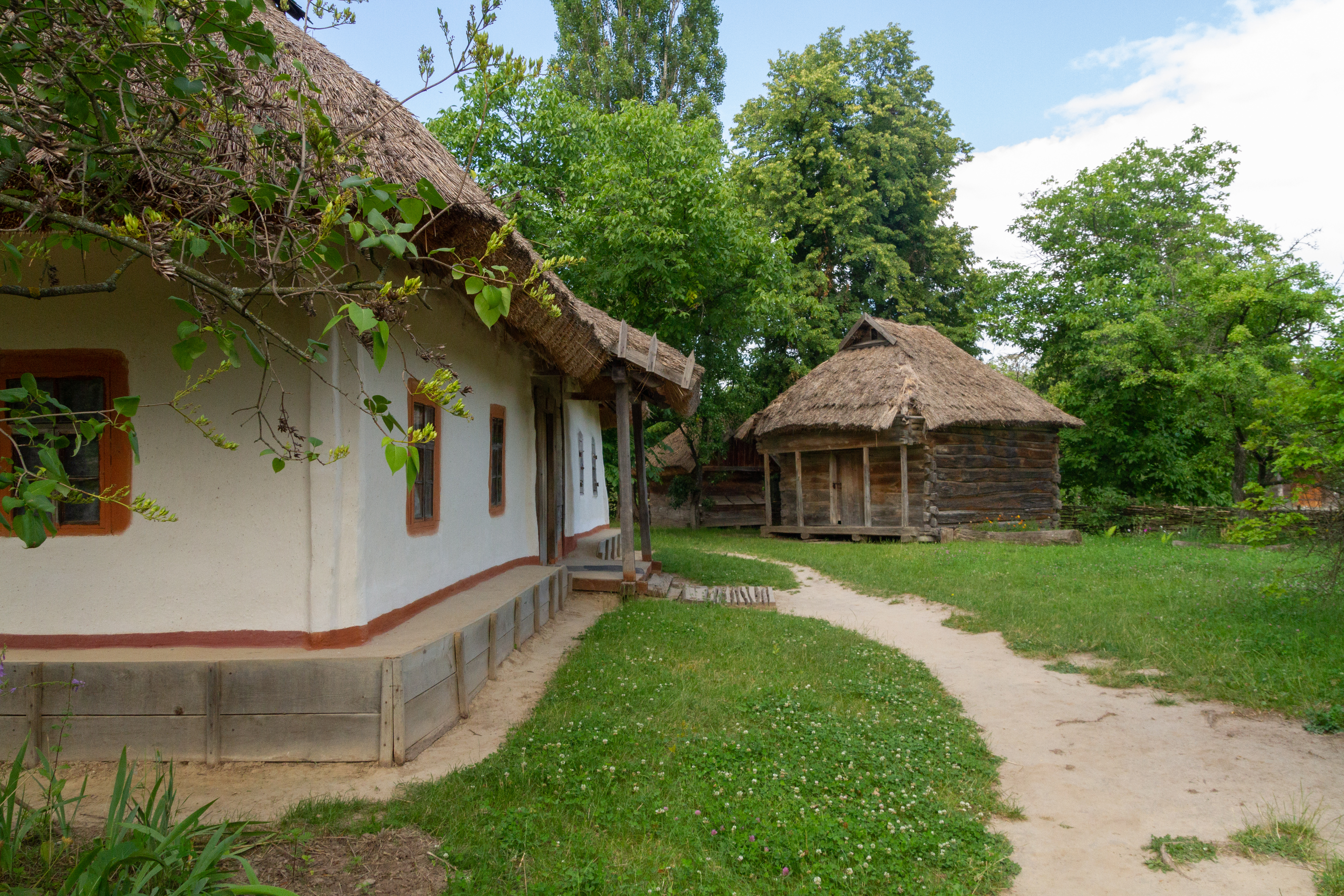
Cottages (Polissia)

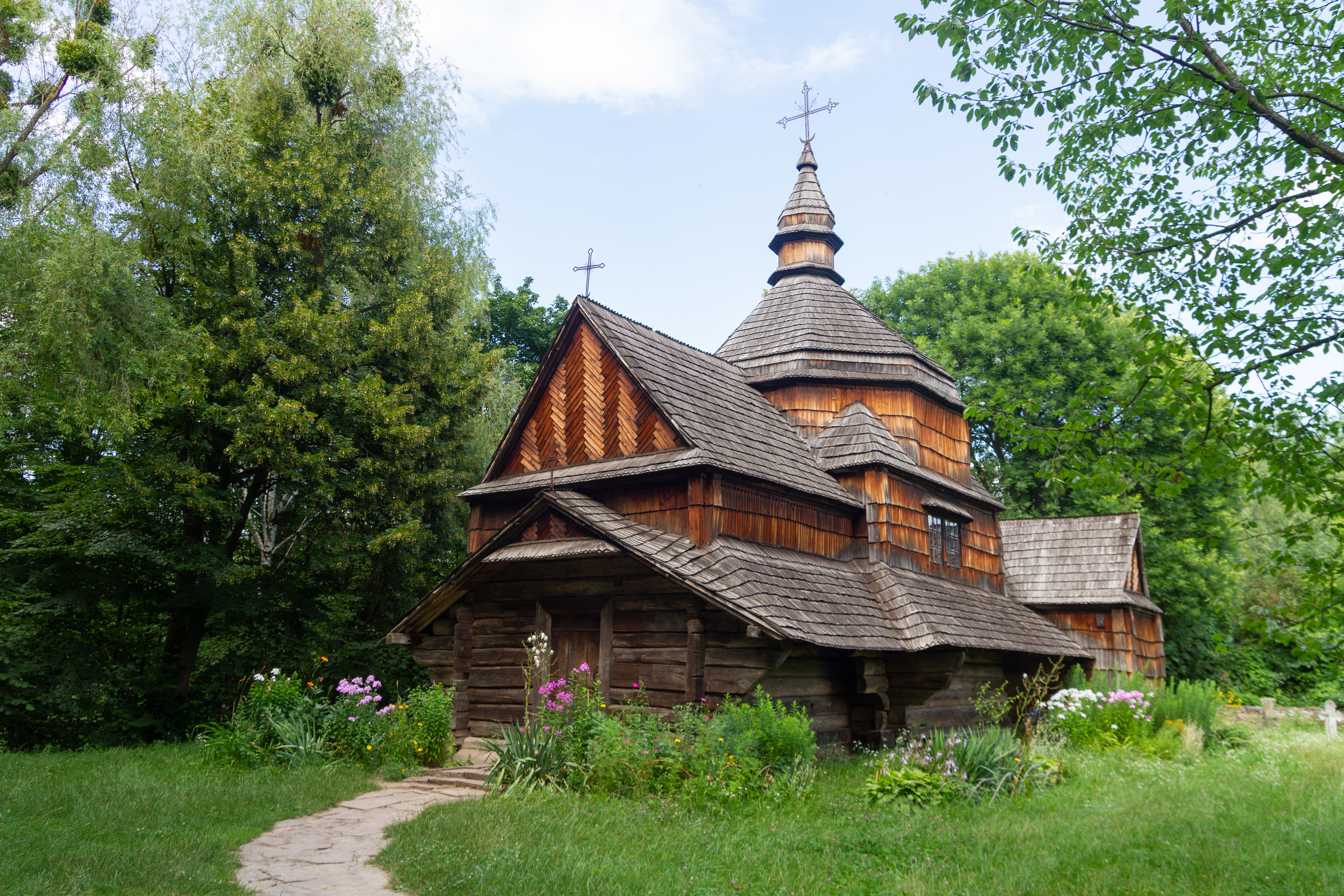
St. Nicholas Church

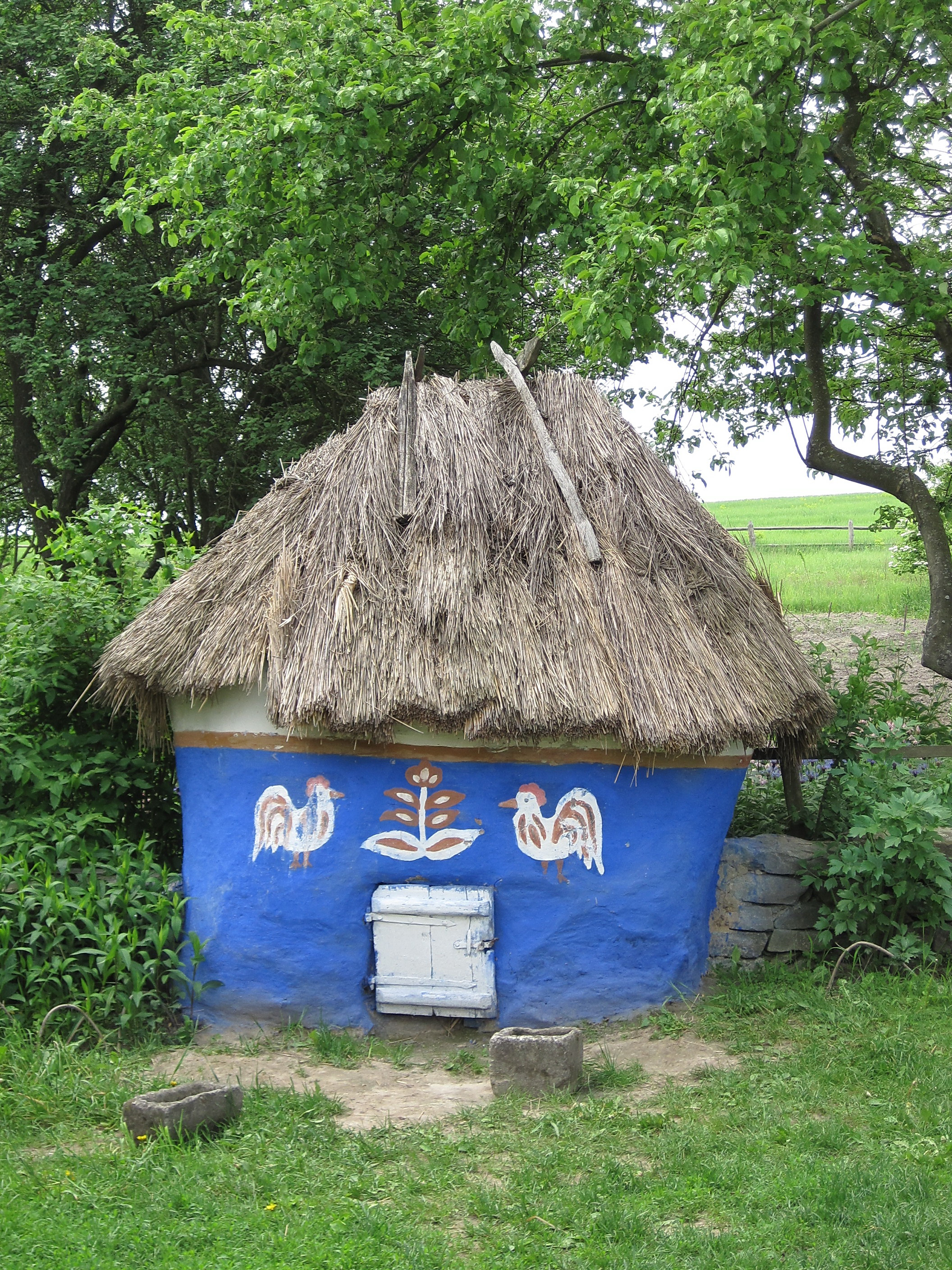
Painted outbuilding

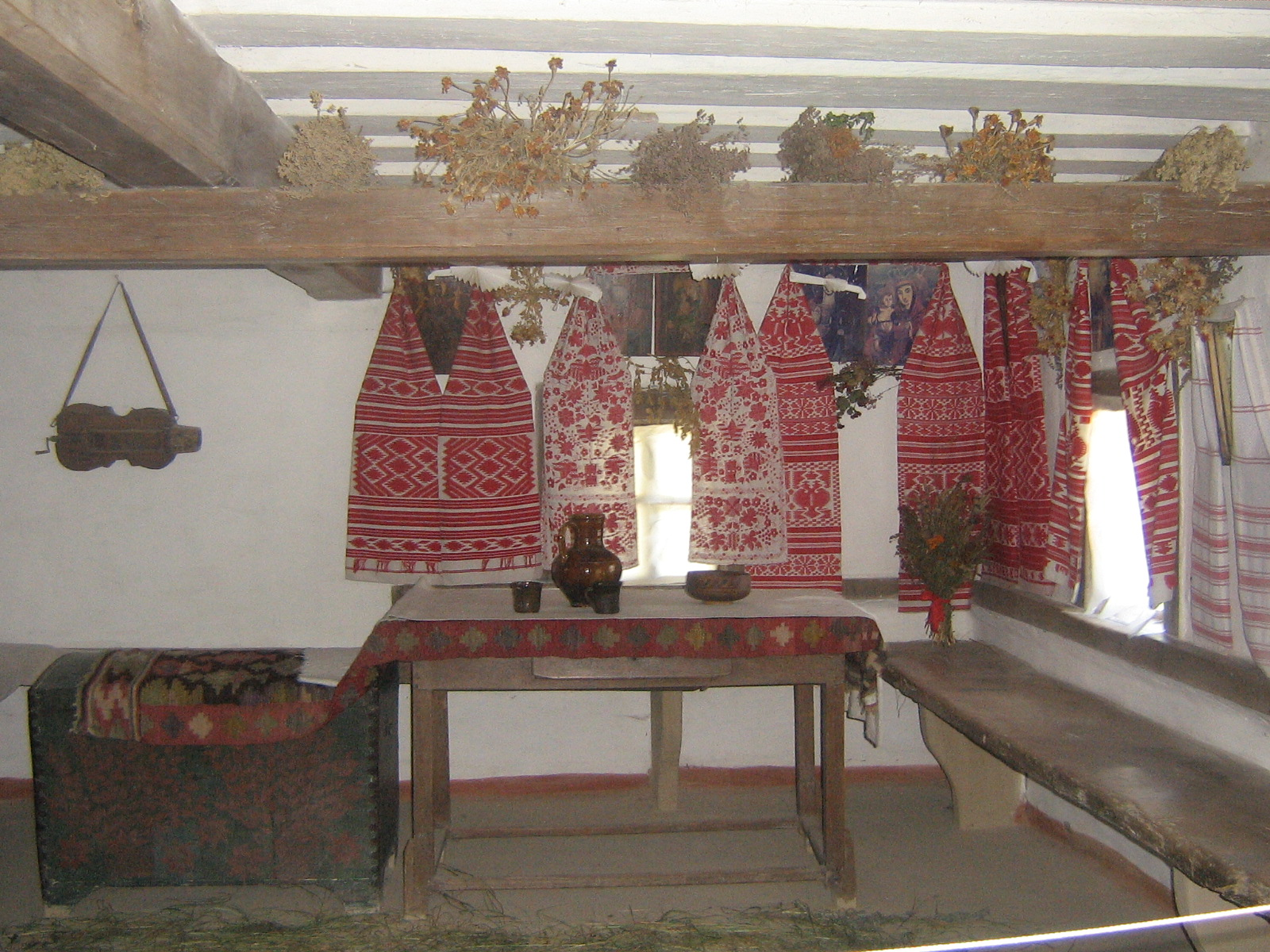
Interior

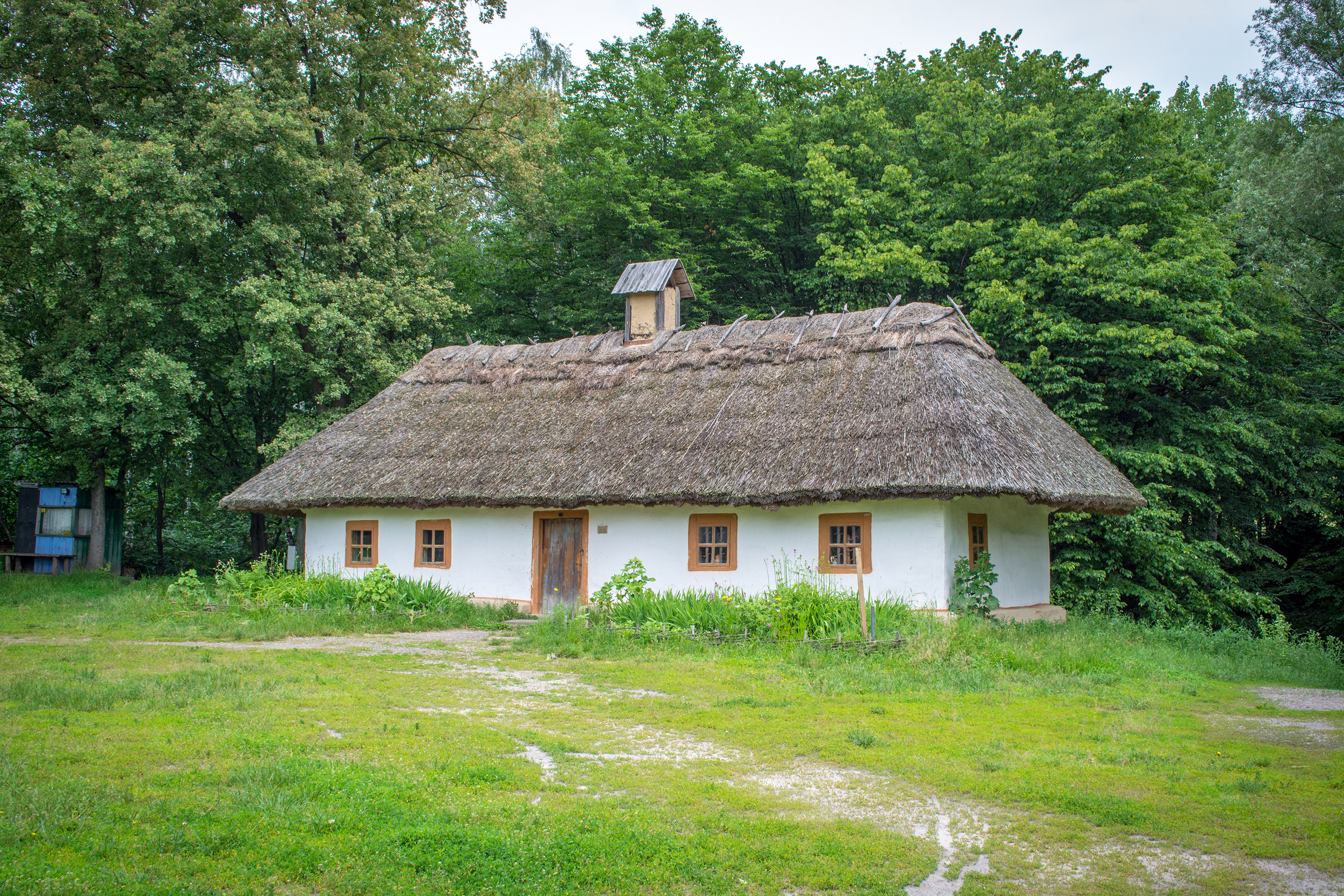
Thatched-roof cottage

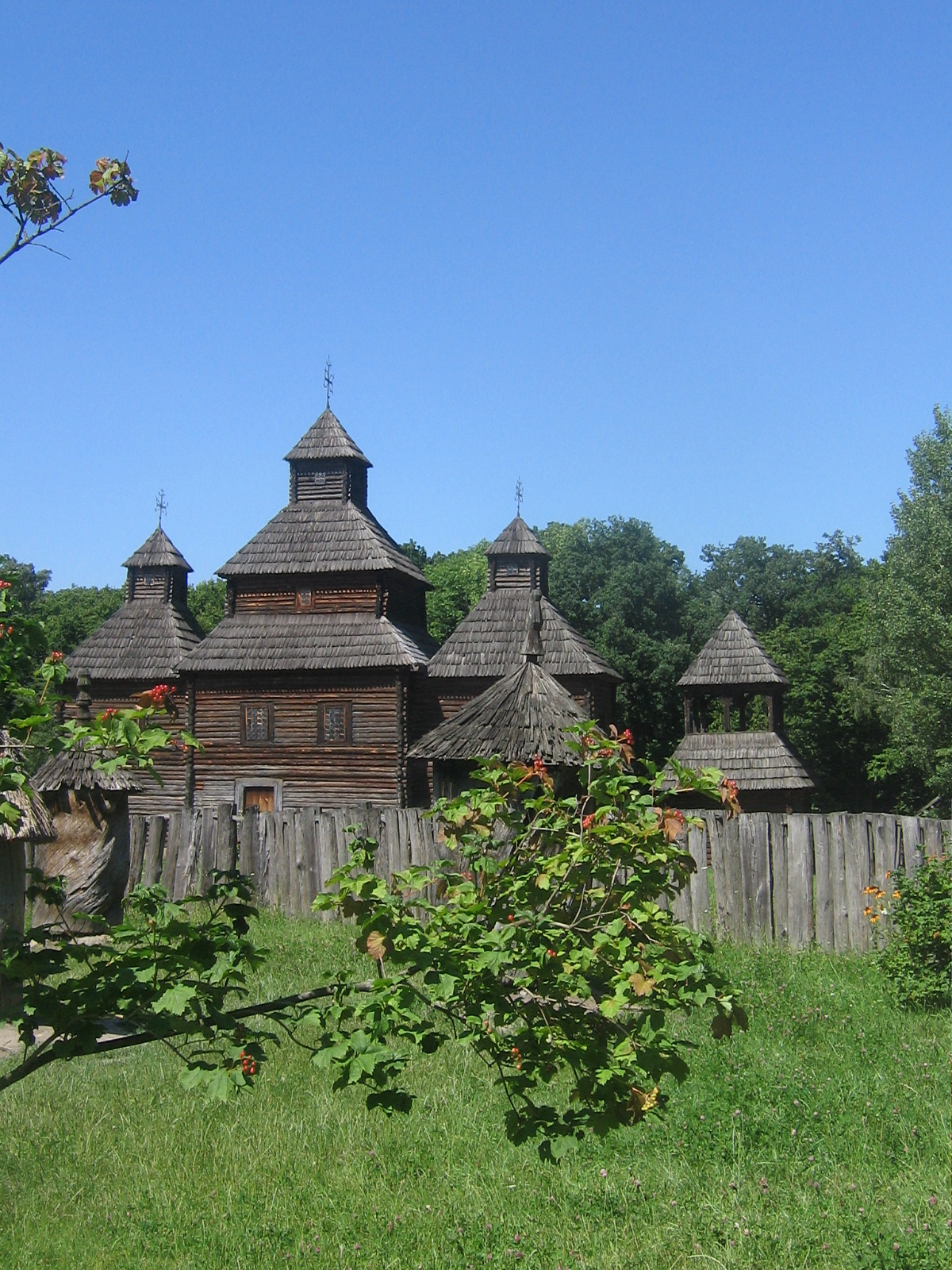
Wooden church

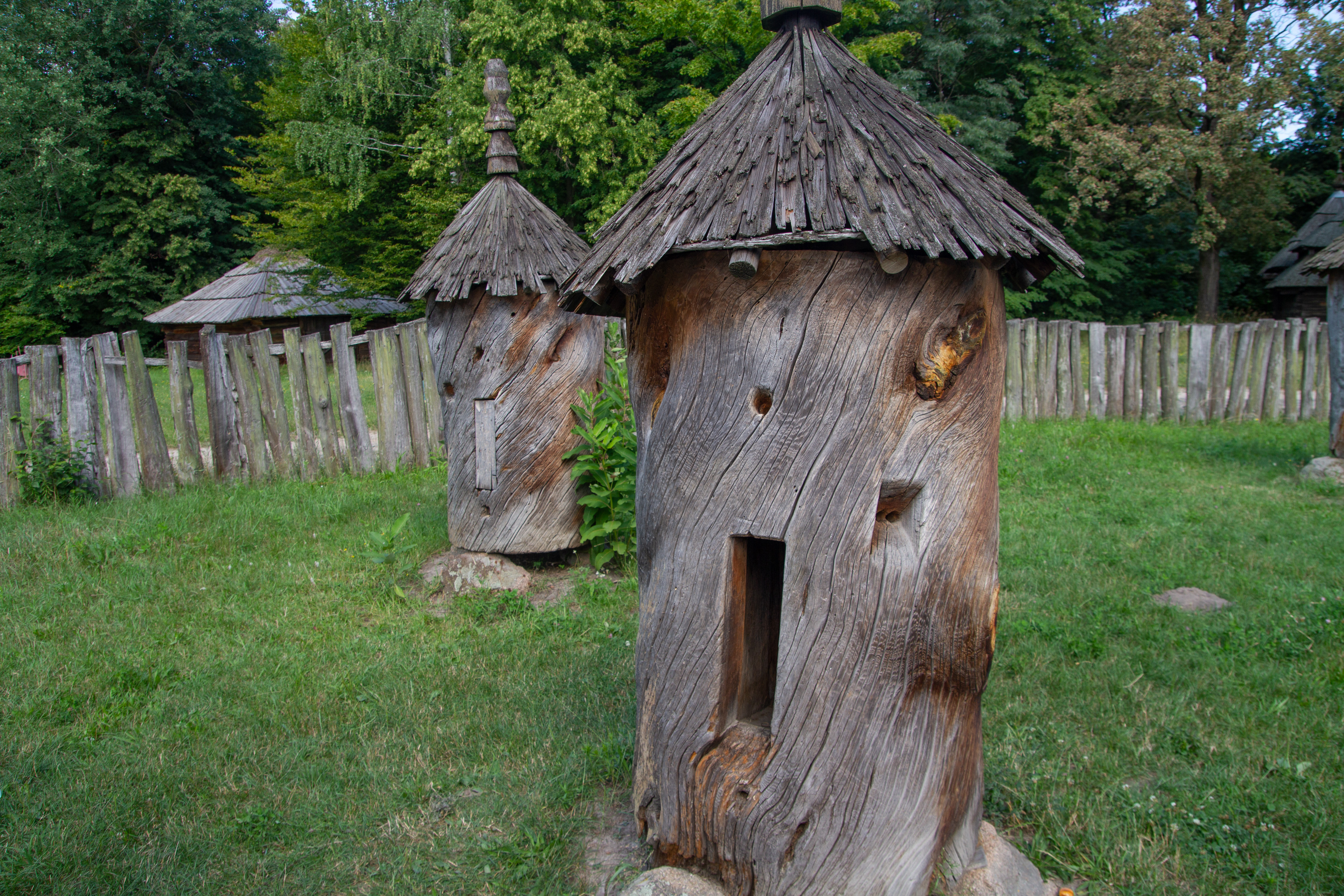
Beehive

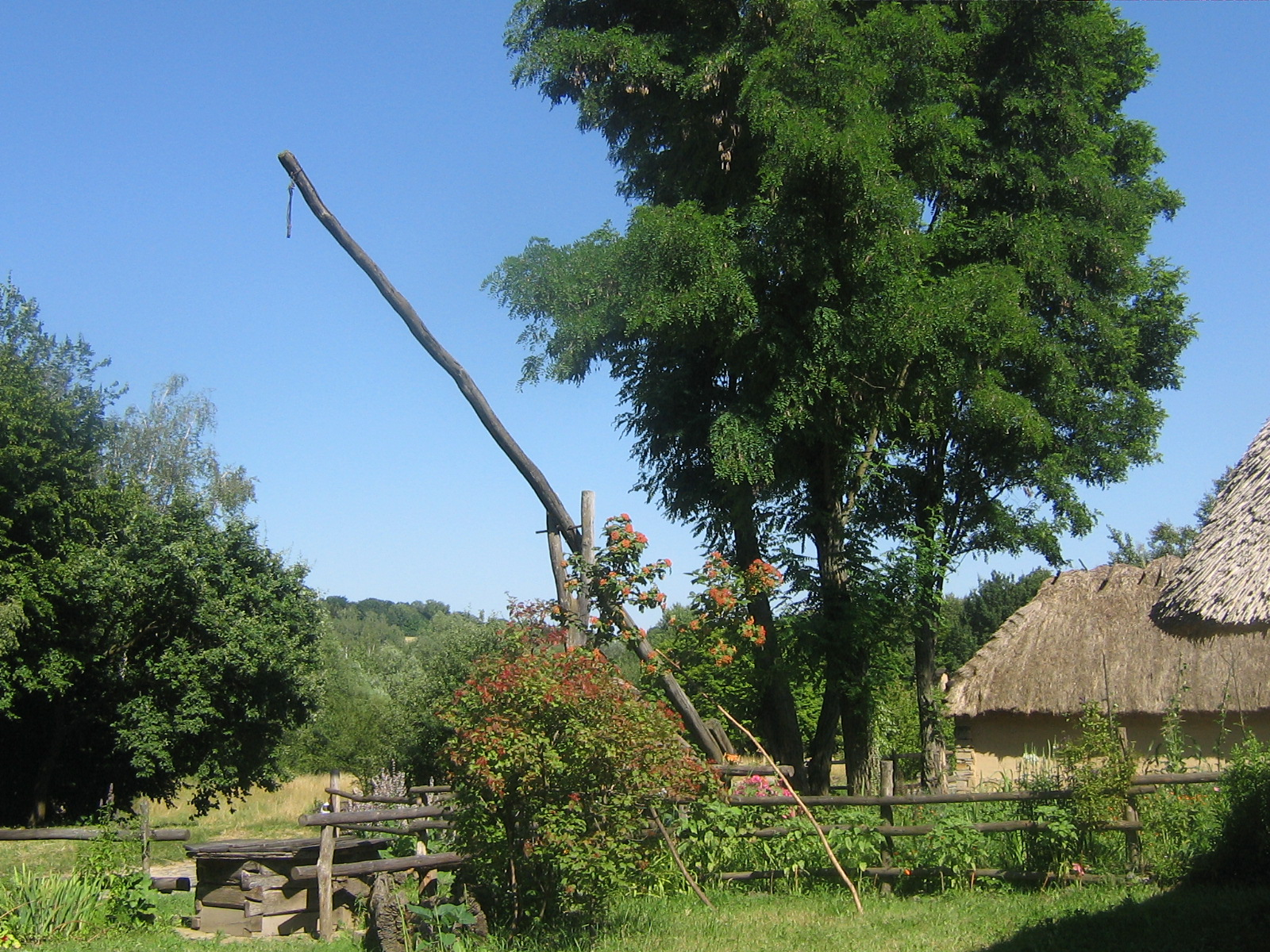
Traditional well

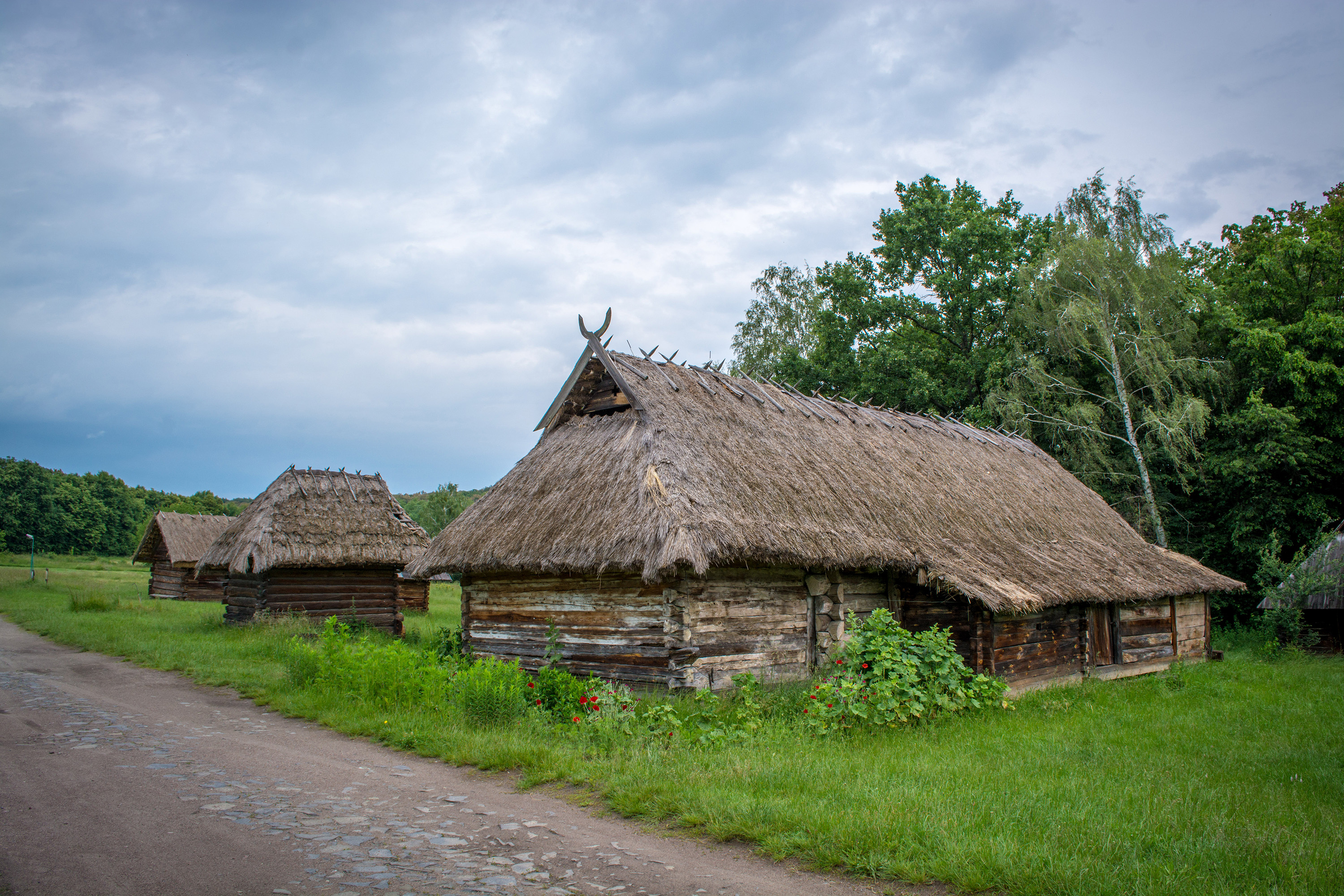
Farm buildings

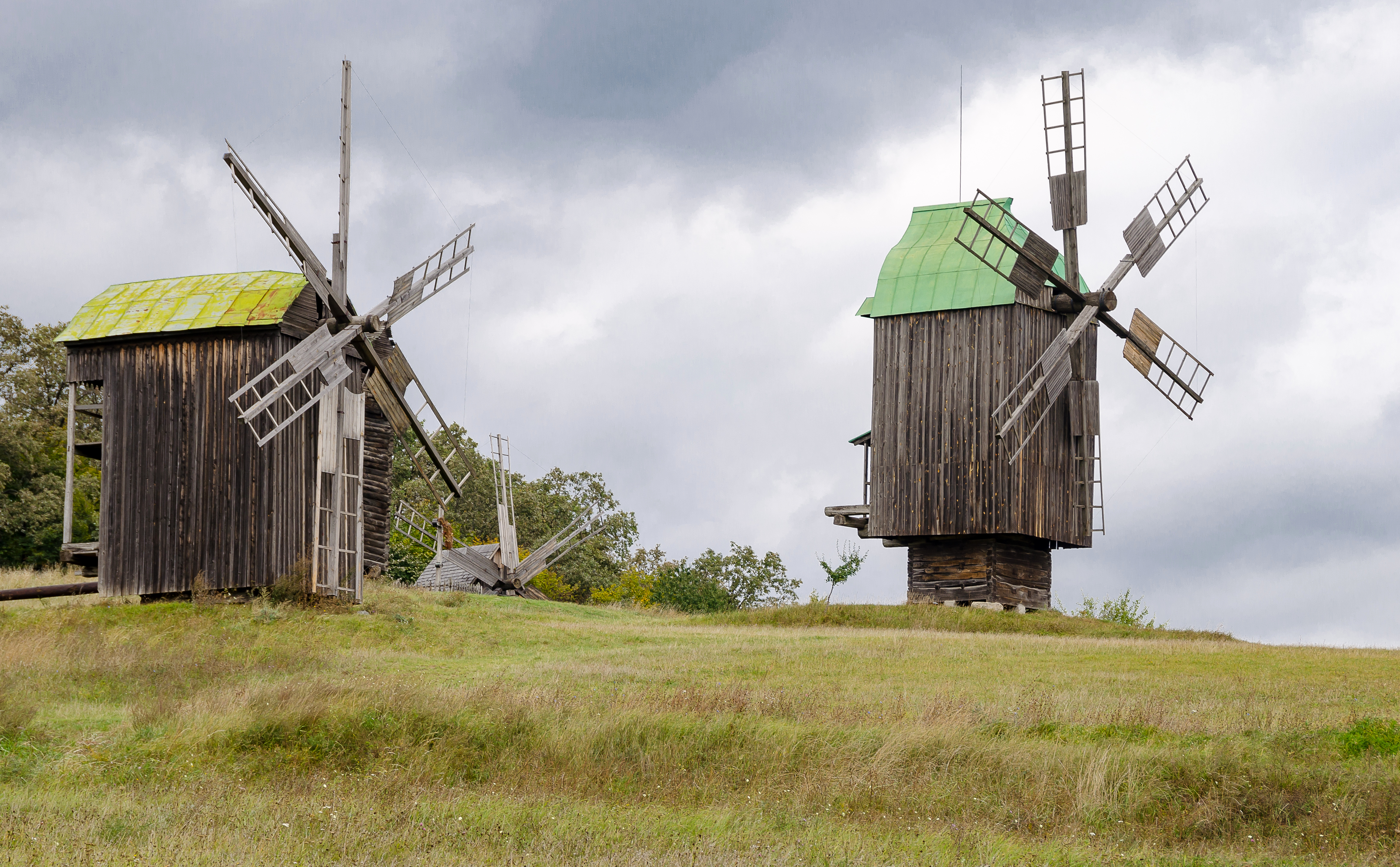
Windmills (Chernihiv Oblast)

== See also ==
- Petro Tronko
- Bitter Harvest (2017 Film)
