= Pyrohy =

Pyrohy may refer to

- Pyrih (pl. pyrohy), a kind of Ukrainian pie
- Pierogi, boiled dumplings with a variety of fillings, called pyrohy by Western Ukrainians
- Pyrohiv, a village south of Kyiv
