= Lert =

Lert may refer to:

- Lert (surname)
- Lerd, Ardabil
- Naval Station Rota (ICAO code LERT), a Spanish and American military base in southwestern Spain
