= Lert (surname) =

Lert is a surname. Notable people with the surname include:

- Ernst Lert (1883–1955), Austrian stage director, writer, composer, librettist, and music historian
- Richard Lert (1885–1980), Austrian-born American conductor
- Vladimir Lert (born 1979), Latvian filmmaker, screenwriter, art director, and producer
