= Rejection (film) =

- Directed by: Vladimir Lert
- Produced by: Andrey Savenko; Yevgeny Dukhovich; Maria Kael
- Starring: Sergei Babkin; Aleksandr Bashirov; Bohdan Stupka; Agnia Ditkovskyte; Viktoria Bilan
- Cinematography: Dmitry Yashenkov
- Music by: Yuri Grom
- Production company: MMG Films
- Release date: 10 November 2011
- Running time: 87 min.
- Country: Ukraine
- Language: Russian

Rejection (Ukrainian: «Відторгнення», romanized: Vidtorgnennia) is a Ukrainian apocalyptic film directed by Vladimir Lert (ru) with Sergei Babkin (ru) and Aleksandr Bashirov. It was made in 2009, but not released until 2011 in Ukrainian. It was shown in Russian (as Отторжение) at the Ranok film festival in April 2012, and in Russian with English subtitles released on Amazon Prime.
