= Vladimir Lert =

Latvian screenwriter and director (born 1979)

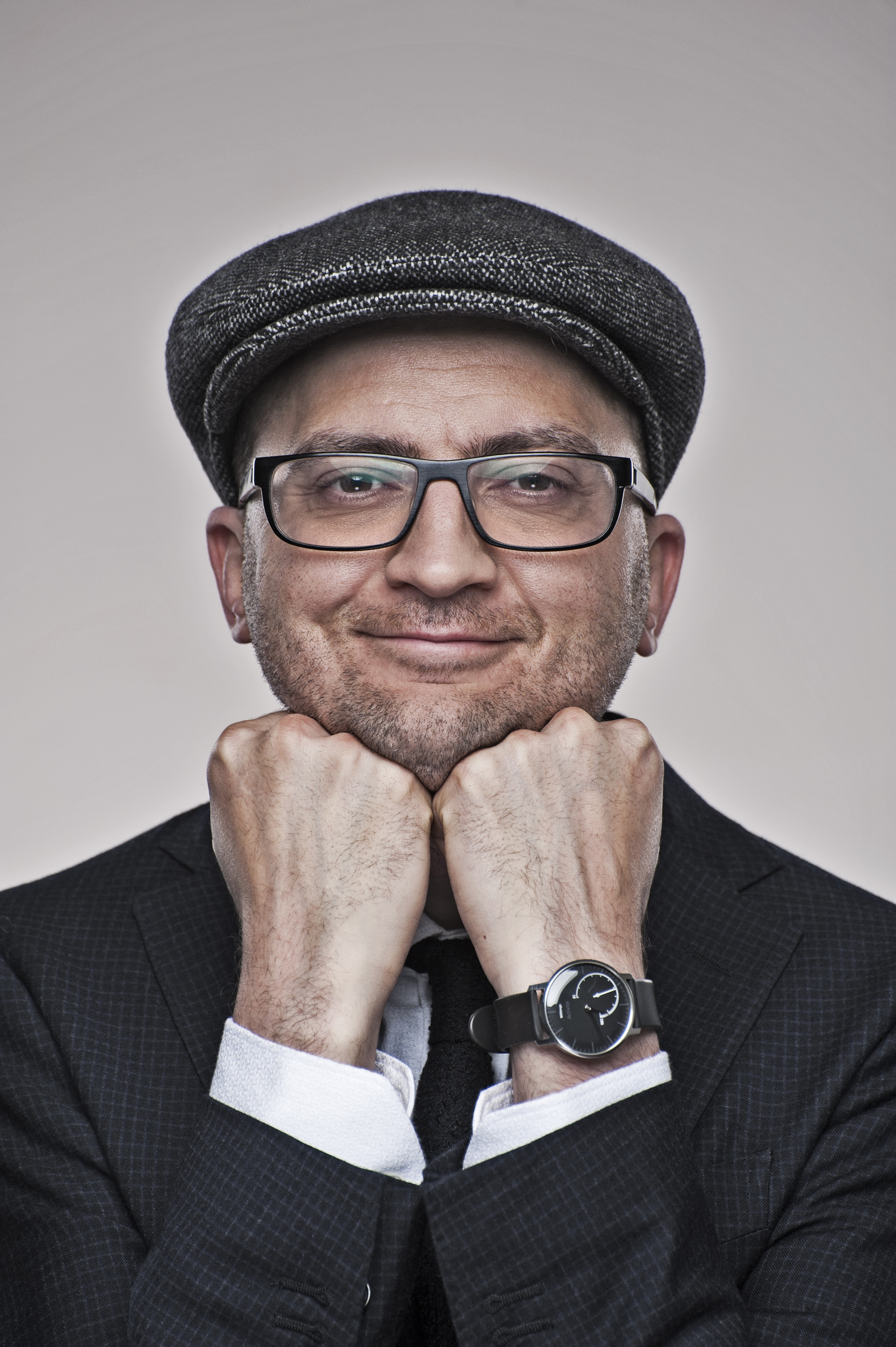
- Born: June 12, 1979 (age 46); Riga, Latvia
- Occupations: Film director, screenwriter, film producer
- Years active: 2001–present

Vladimir Lert is a Latvian filmmaker, screenwriter, and producer.

== Biography ==
Lert studied direction and acting simultaneously, the former at Brooks Institute in Santa Barbara, California, and the latter at the International Actors' School in Los Angeles founded by Alexander Kuznetsov. After completing his studies in 2006, he traveled to Kiev, Ukraine, where he filmed a number of small budget films and participated in the Kiev Film Festival.

Lert began his career in Hollywood as an assistant producer, while also working as an actor in several films. He shot the film "Rejection", released in 2011.

In 2016, he wrote the screenplay for and directed St. Valentine's Night. The script underwent significant improvisation during filming.

Lert's third feature, Tevye's Daughters was released in 2017. The film is based on Sholem Aleichem's Tevye's Daughters (adapted into the musical The Fiddler on the Roof). Lert shot the film partially at the Pyrohiv Outdoor Museum in Ukraine to recreate early Ukrainian country life and folklore. He based the screenplay on Memorial Prayer, a play by Grigori Gorin. The plot centres around Tevye the Dairyman's attempts to secure marriages for his seven daughters. The movie was screened at the Rhode Island International Film Festival.

In 2018, "Tevye's Daughters" was nominated for a Golden Globe in the foreign language film category.

== Filmography ==
=== As director ===
- 2009 – Rejection
- 2013 – Captive
- 2016 – St. Valentine's night
- 2017 – Tevye's Daughters

=== As writer ===
- 2009 – Rejection
- 2013 – Captive
- 2017 – Tevye's Daughters
