= Ukrainian khata =

Traditional peasant dwelling

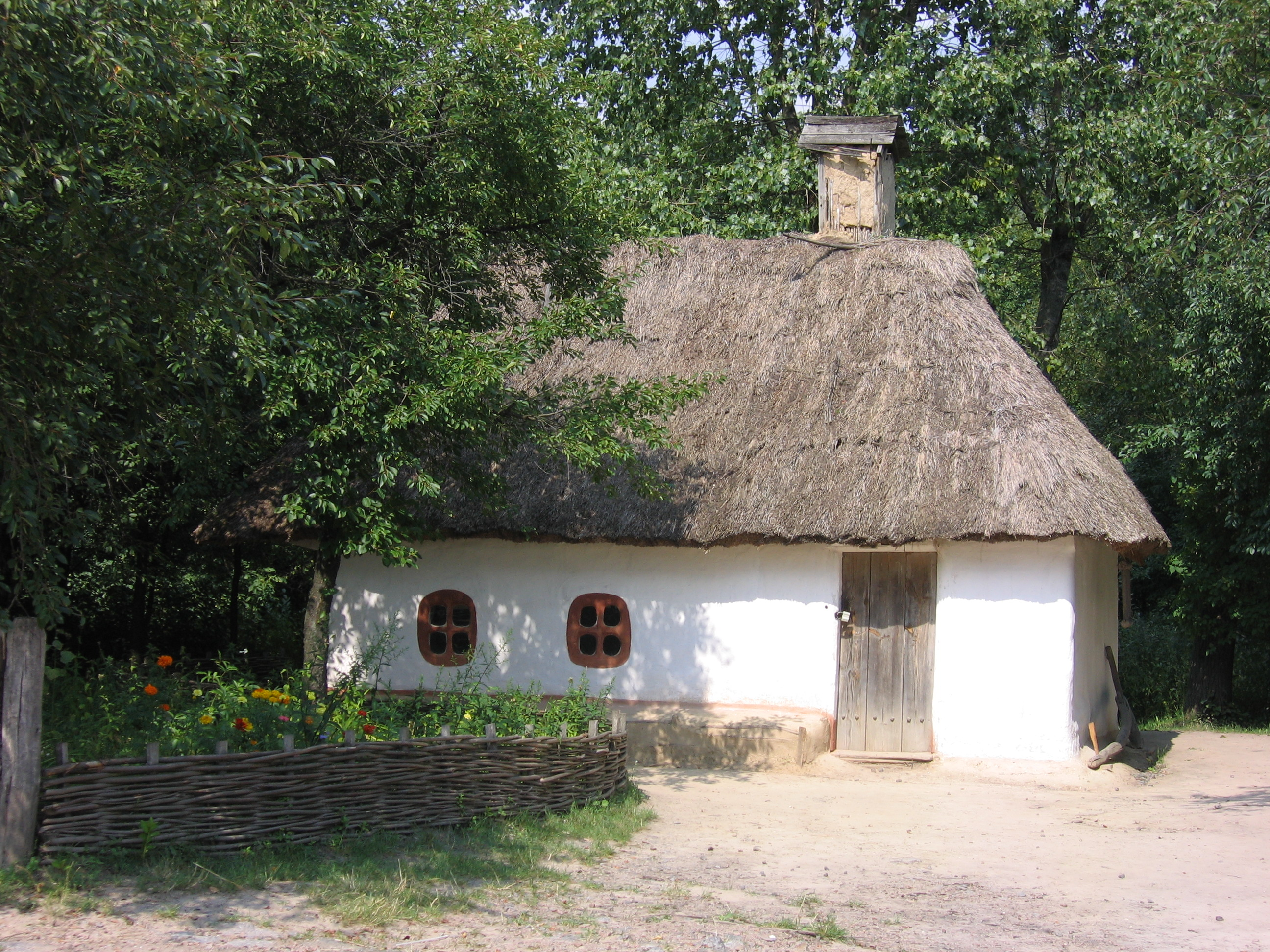
Ukrainian khata with rounded windows in National Museum of Folk Architecture and Folkways of Ukraine

The Ukrainian khata (Ukrainian: хата) is a traditional peasant dwelling that developed as one of the central elements of Ukrainian material culture and everyday life. It was usually a single-story, rectangular building with clay or wooden walls whitewashed with lime, and a thatched roof made of straw, reeds, or later tiles. Inside, the most important feature was the stove—not only for cooking and heating but also as a place of rest and a symbol of the household hearth.

The khata had a clear layout: the siny (сіни; an entrance corridor), the khata proper (the main room with the stove), and sometimes a guest room (світлиця svitlytsia) or a storage room (комора komora). Its architectural and decorative features reflected regional traditions, natural conditions, and the social status of the owners. Whitewashed walls, painted ornaments, embroidered towels, and wooden details emphasized the connection with folk aesthetics and worldview.

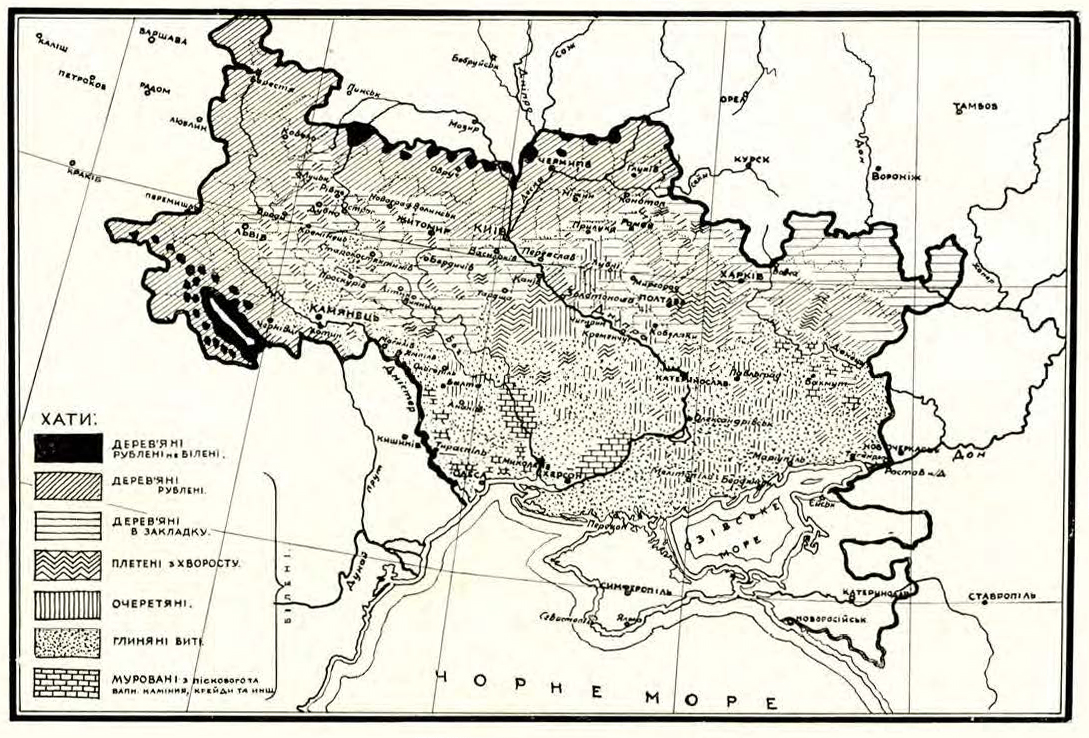
Geographical distribution of Ukrainian khatas by building material (according to Fedir Vovk, 1928): black - wooden, not whitened; diagonal and horizontal lines - wooden, whitened; zigzag - woven from twigs, whitened; vertical lines - reed, whitened; dotted - clay, whitened; rectangles - stone, whitened.

== Varieties ==
Various historical regions of Ukraine have distinct construction traditions. For example, in the Carpathian region and in Northern Ukraine, where forests are abundant, the most popular material for residential buildings was wood, meanwhile in other territories clay and straw were more common materials.

=== Boykos and Lemkos ===
Boyko khatas were traditionally built from timber and consisted of three separate spaces, with residential and utility rooms united under a single roof. In some cases a gallery with a tall straw-covered roof could be built around the housefront and doors were decorated with carving. Boyko stoves didn't have chimneys. Among neighbouring Lemkos it was common to construct an additional wall along the housefront, the space behind which would be filled with hay, which contributed to better insulation.

=== Hutsuls ===
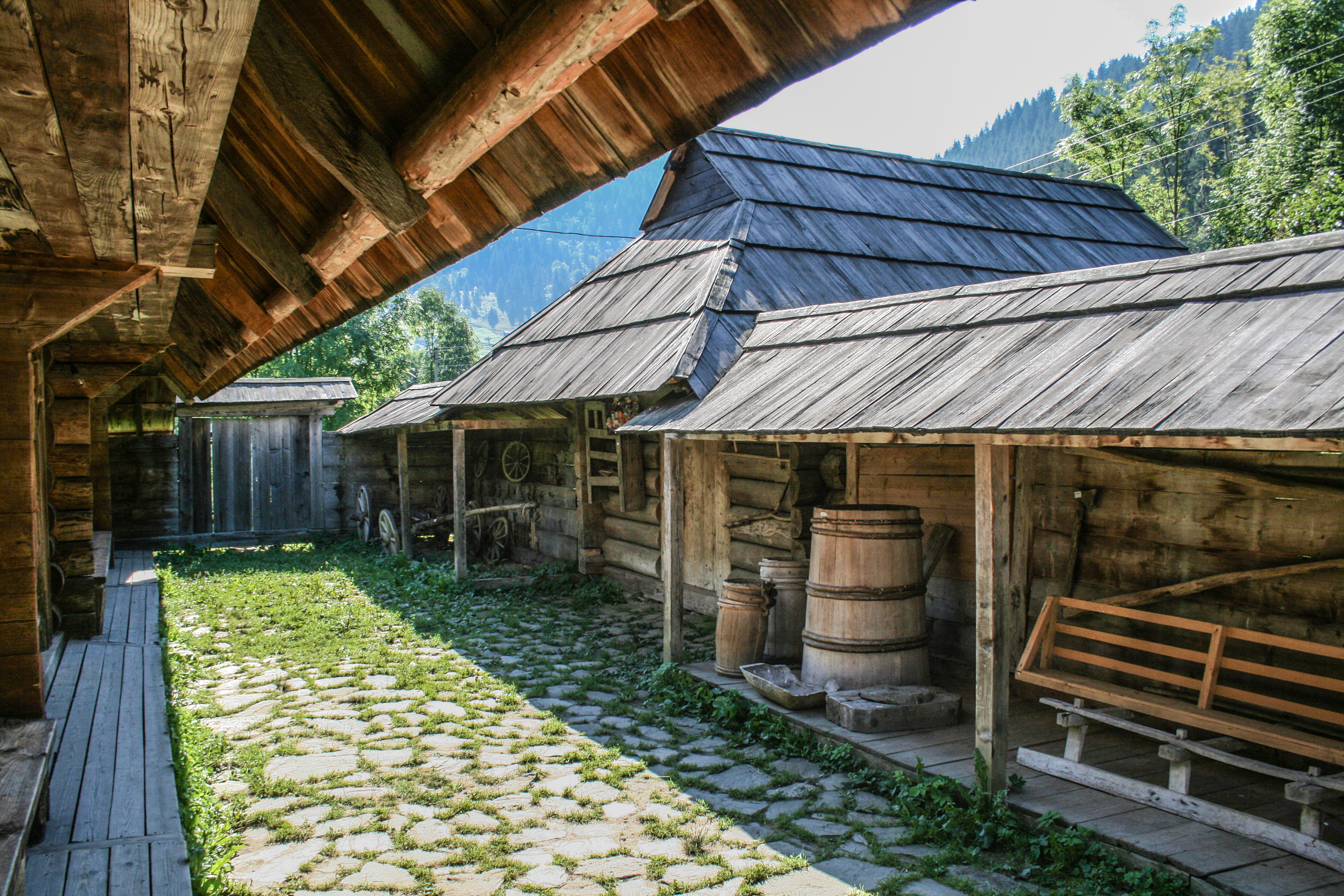
Inner court of a Hutsul grazhda in Kryvorivnia

Among richer Hutsuls a specific type of housing called grazhda (Ukrainian: ґражда) was traditionally widespread. A grazhda functioned as a type of manor and was enclosed with a wooden fence connected to residential and utility buildings, creating a common space. The court of the manor was normally paved with stone. It was located under the open sky and centered around the residential building, which was divided in two sections. Sheep sheds were located under one roof with the residential area, providing heating. As a grazhda was typically located in a remote mountain area, its roofed fence protected the inhabitants from severe weather and wild animals, and was also used to store various utensils and wood. Hutsul houses had no chimneys and were characterized with the presence of galleries at their entrances.

=== Transcarpathia and Bukovyna ===
In Transcarpathia outer walls of traditional houses were painted white, and their roofs were covered either with straw, or with wood shingle. In Bukovyna many houses were built from woven vines covered with clay. In both regions it was common to decorate walls of houses, as well as furniture and dishes, with multicolored painting.

=== Volhynia ===
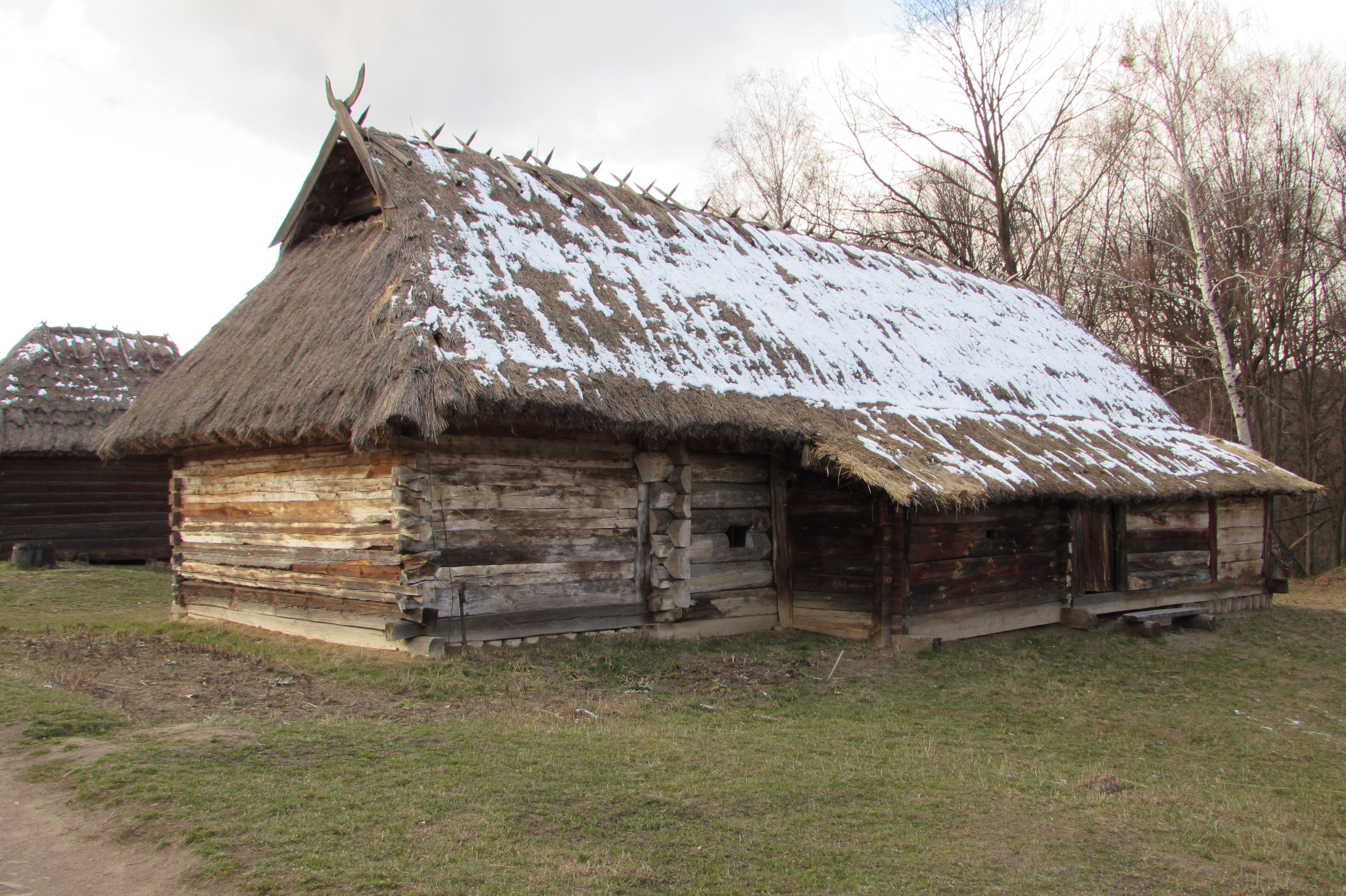
A traditional khata from the outskirts of Kamin-Kashyrskyi, Volyn Oblast

In Volhynia houses were traditionally built on a wooden framework, with the residential part being built from pine wood. Utility spaces were constructed from a mix of wood, clay, chaff or straw. In Volyn it was common to paint the walls of khatas white, meanwhile the foundations, windowframes and door posts were tinted with red clay. The roofs had four slopes and were covered with rye straw.

=== Polesia ===
In Chernihiv Polissia until the early 20th century many khatas had no chimneys, and smoke that emerged due to lighting, heating and cooking was removed from the building through special holes in the roof. The traditional houses in the region were constructed from wood and had roofs with four or, sometimes, two slopes, covered with straw. The khata consisted of two or three sections, and its outer walls were fully or partially painted white. In some locations barns were also painted. If the housefront was located directly in a street, the court of the khata was separated with a large roofed gate covered with wood or straw.

=== Podolia ===
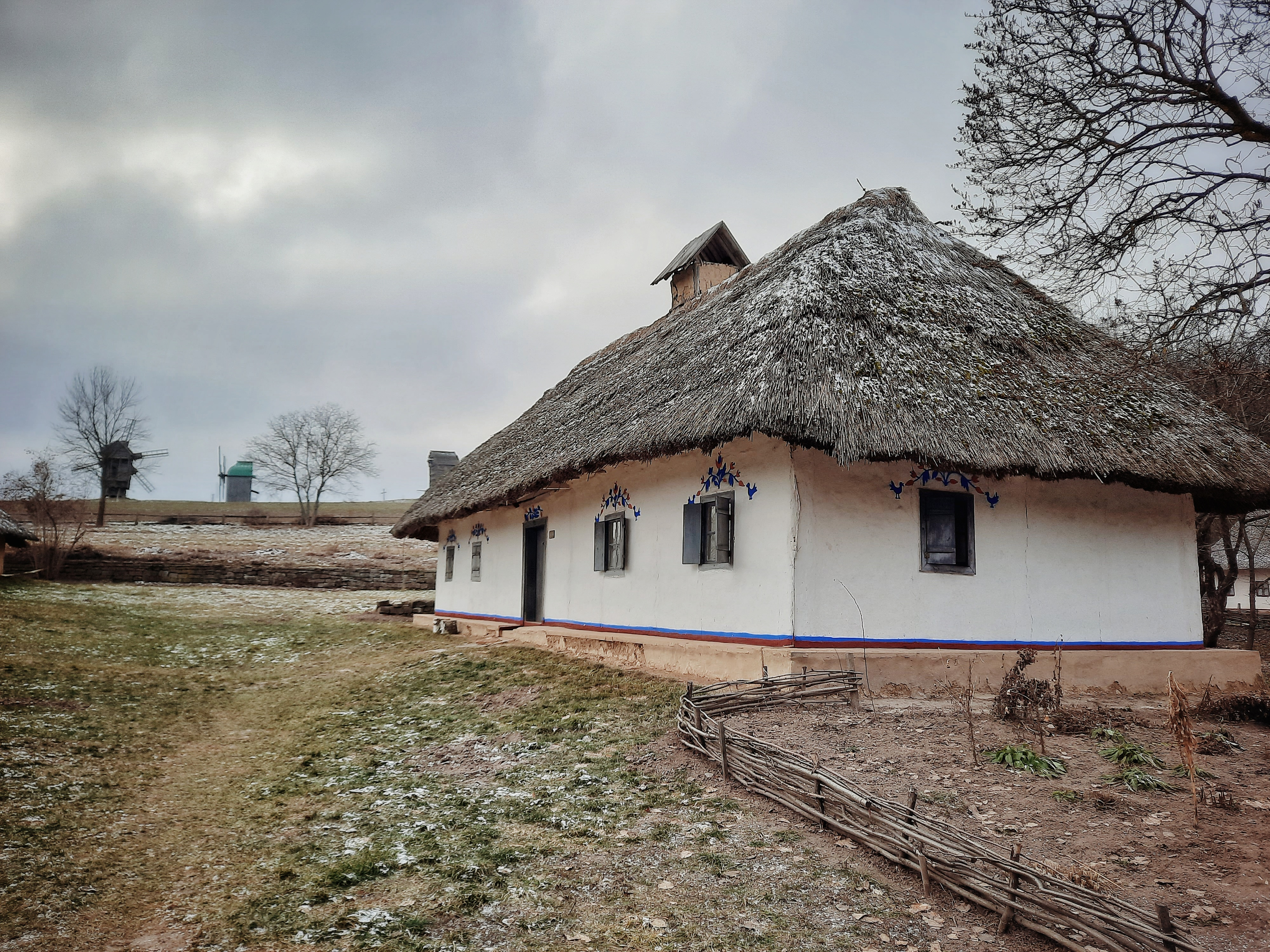
A traditional khata from Podilsk Raion, historical Podolia

In Podolia traditional khatas were built of clay and straw supported by an oak carcass. The ceiling was constructed of hornbeam twigs and covered with clay. The floors consisted of two layers of clay with a mix of clay and straw in between. The roof was covered with straw, and the facades were painted white and adorned with decorative paintings.

=== Dnieper Ukraine ===
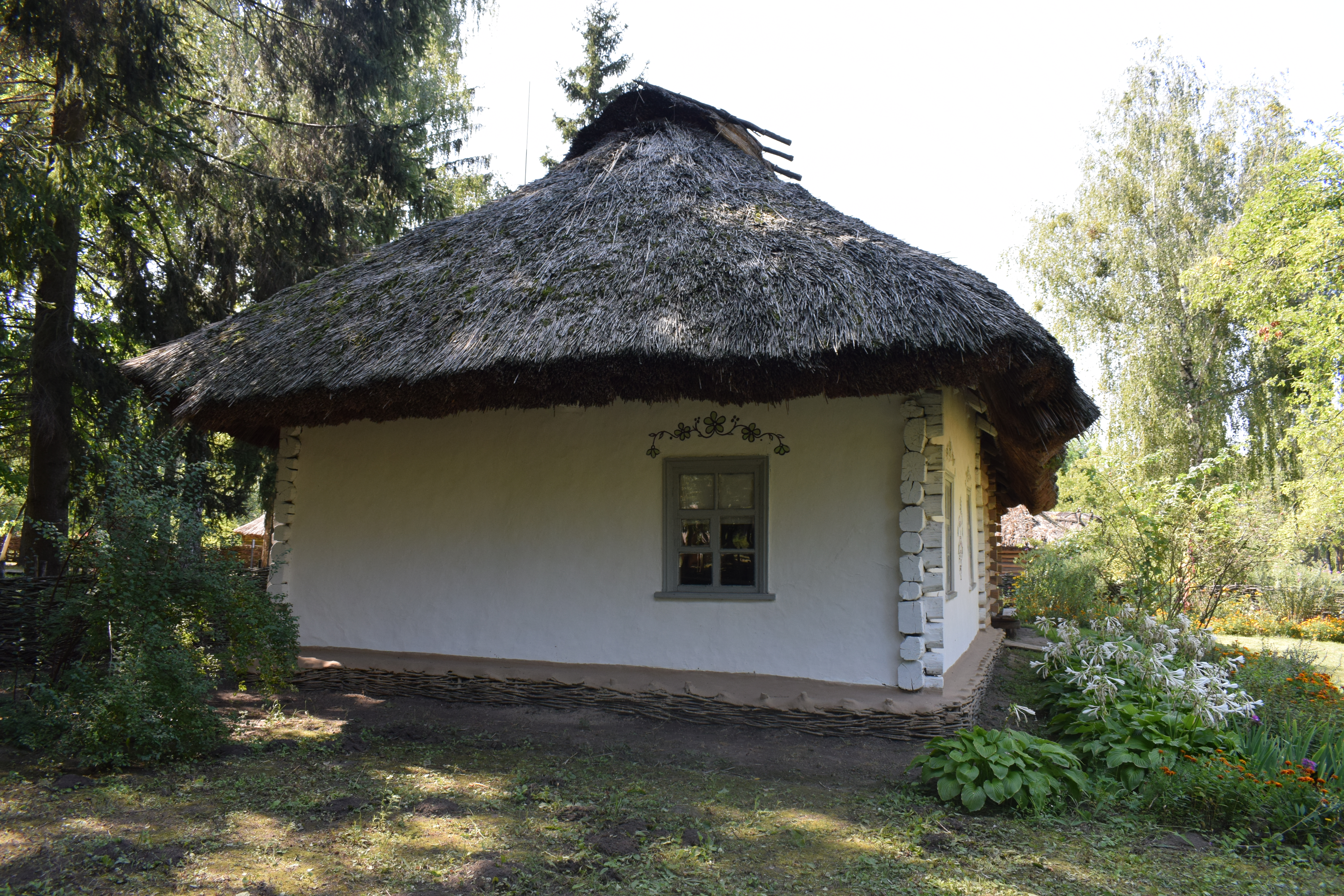
A carpenter's house in Pereiaslav

A common type of housing traditionally built in Poltava region were clay-straw khatas with buttressed walls, which are thicker in the lower part. Residential parts of the buildings were normally covered with white paint, and the lower parts of the walls were protected with woven twigs. Barns and other utility buildings were built of wood or twigs and covered with broad roofs covered with straw.

In the region of Cherkasy it was typical for khatas to be built separately from barns and other utility buildings. Some of the latter could have their walls elevated above the ground. All constructions normally had straw-covered roofs with four slopes, and the walls of residential buildings were painted white. Poorer houses were usually divided in two sections, meanwhile richer ones had three chambers. Windows of houses belonging to middle-class and richer peasants, as well as urban inhabitants, were equipped with shutters. In villages separate manors were separated from each other with woven hedges.

Some houses had stoves with chimneys directing the smoke outside. The stove was located next to the entrance door. A table was located in the icon corner, which was decorated with plants and embrodered pieces of cloth. Benches stood along nearby walls. An important part of furniture was a wooden box used to store clothes and valuables. Houses of this type were also widespread among Ukrainian settlers in the Far East, many of whom stemmed from Left-bank Ukraine.

== Derived institutions ==
"Reading khatas" (Ukrainian: хата-читальня) were a type of cultural establishments organized in Ukrainian villages during the first years of Soviet rule. They were created after the liquidation of Prosvita societies and functioned as libraries, headquarters of various organizations and lecture halls, contributing to the spread of education, political agitation and propaganda activities. After the Second World War "reading khatas" were transformed into clubs and houses of culture managed by collective farms.

== See also ==
- Mazanka

== Sources ==
- Vovk, Fedir. Studies in Ukrainian Ethnography and Anthropology. Prague: Ukrainskyi Hromadskyi Vydavnychyi Fond, 1928. 354 pp.
