= Mazanka =

Traditional Ukrainian countryside house

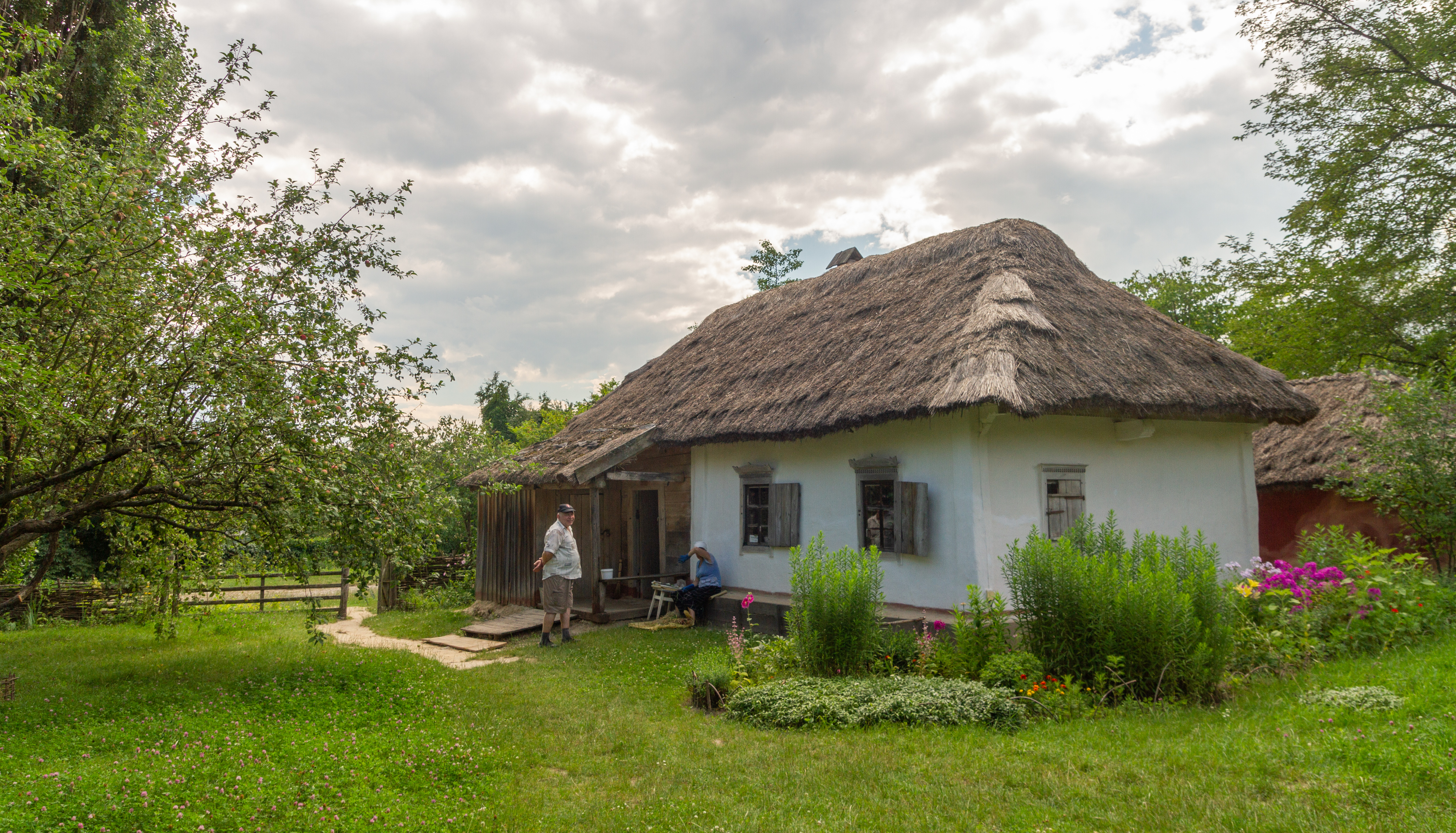
Ukrainian mazanka, Pyrohiv museum, Kyiv region

A mazanka (Ukrainian: мазанка, IPA: [ˈmɑzɐnkɐ]) is a traditional Ukrainian countryside dwelling. A house made of clay, raw brick or brushwood (for the roof), plastered with clay mixed with manure or any other organic substance (adobe technique). The walls were later covered with lime whitewash. Historically, it was widespread in Ukraine and other territories with a significant Ukrainian minority (e.g. Kuban), which was connected with natural conditions, since there were not so many forests, and therefore, wood for construction. Houses similar to mazankas were also built in the Caucasus, where they were known as turluks (palisades).

== Name ==
This type of house is named from the word mazanka (Ukrainian: мазати), meaning 'to smear, to grease, to plaster with clay mortar'.

== Construction ==
In order to prepare the clay for the future dwelling, a big circle was made where the people put clay and sand, water was poured in the center, and straw on top. Straw was usually used from wheat, the thicker the stem, the better it was considered. Then the clay got kneaded. It didn't make sense to use shovels or anything else, so it was trampled with feet, and horses were often used. Stirring began from the center of the pile to the edge, adding water or straw little by little as needed. Fresh horse or cow manure was often added as a plasticizer. As a result of kneading, a homogeneous mass was formed, more like dough, the main thing is that it is not too liquid.

== Technology ==
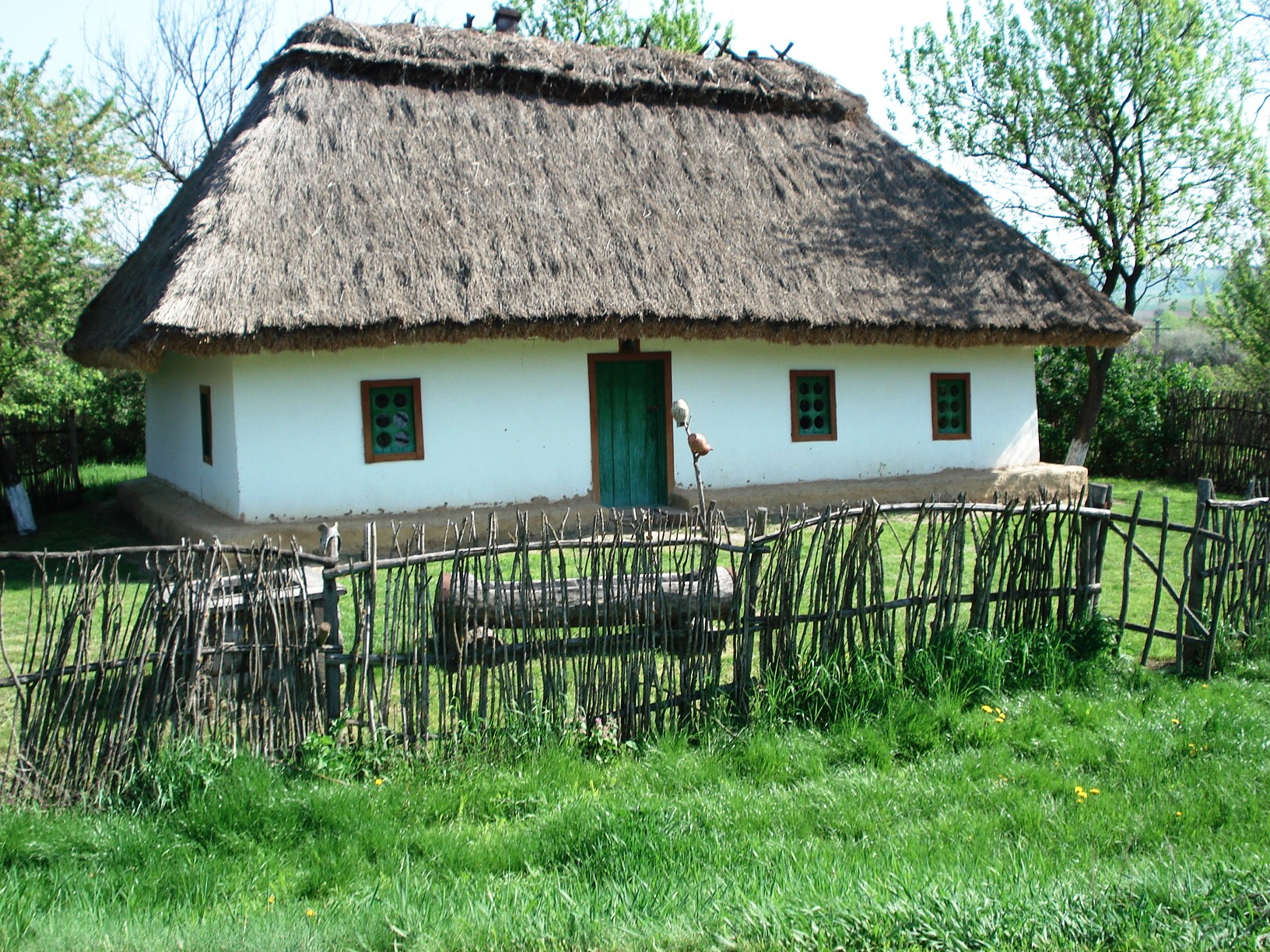
A mazanka in Subotiv, Cherkasy region

The walls of the mazankas consisted of a wooden frame. The space between the ploughs and the Riegels (cells) was filled with lumps of clay mixed with straw or reeds (rolls), or woven walls were plastered with this material; these operations were known as "marching".

After plastering and drying, the walls were whitewashed with lime, chalk or white clay.

A hut with walls woven from brushwood and plastered with clay was called a khvorostianka (Ukrainian: хворостянка).

Wooden houses (in particular, chopped "in shuls") could also be plastered with clay. In order for the clay solution to stick better, the walls were nailed – pegs and nails were hammered into them (similar to fixing wood chips before plastering).

One of the most common was a house on plows, the walls of which were covered with reeds and plastered with clay and straw. Smears were divided into: wooden, woven, straw and reeded.

== See also ==
- Ukrainian khata
- Fachwerkhaus
- Chalet
- Izba
