= Izba =

Traditional Russian countryside dwelling

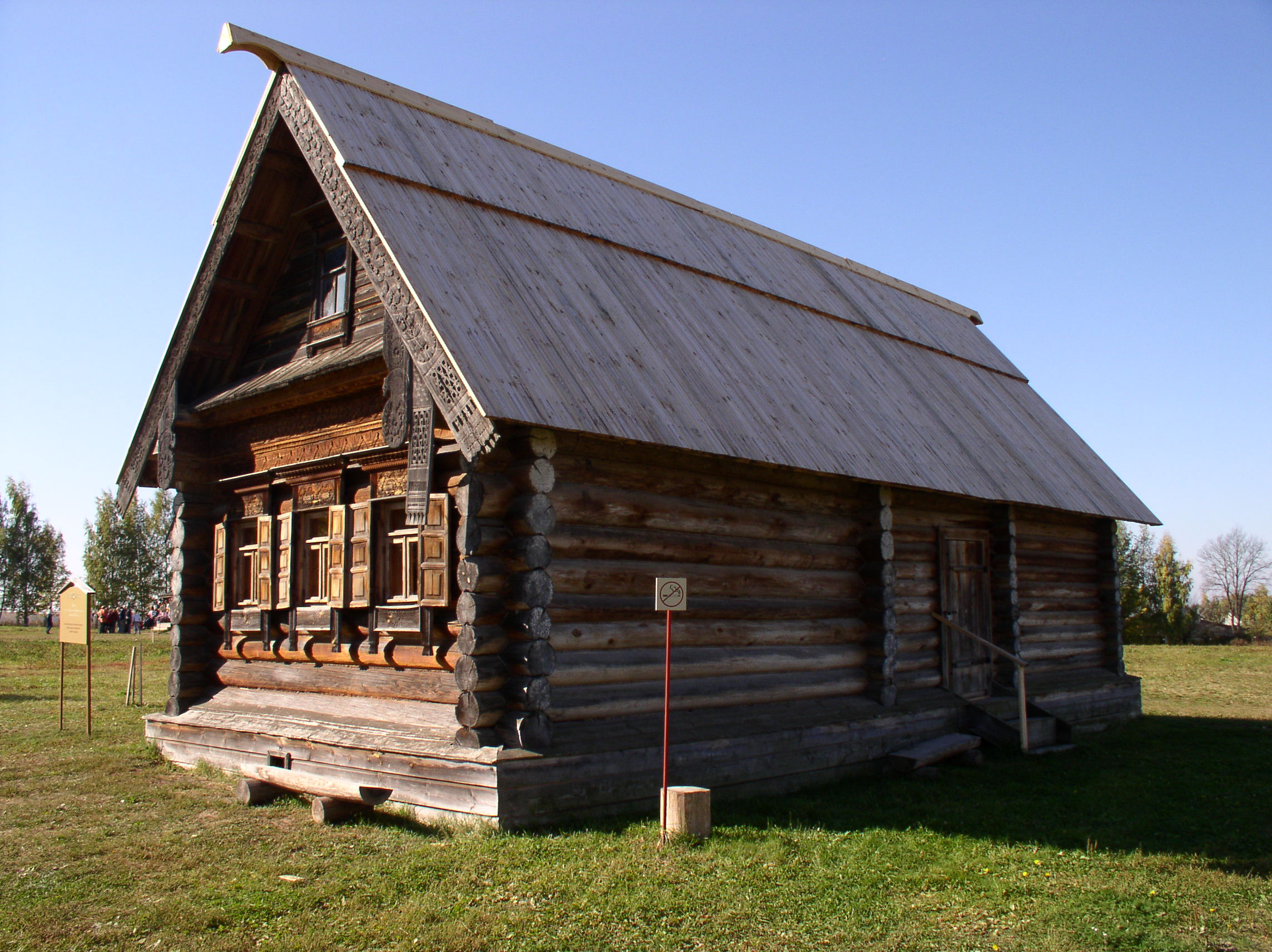
An izba at the Museum of Wooden Architecture and Peasant Life in Suzdal, Russia

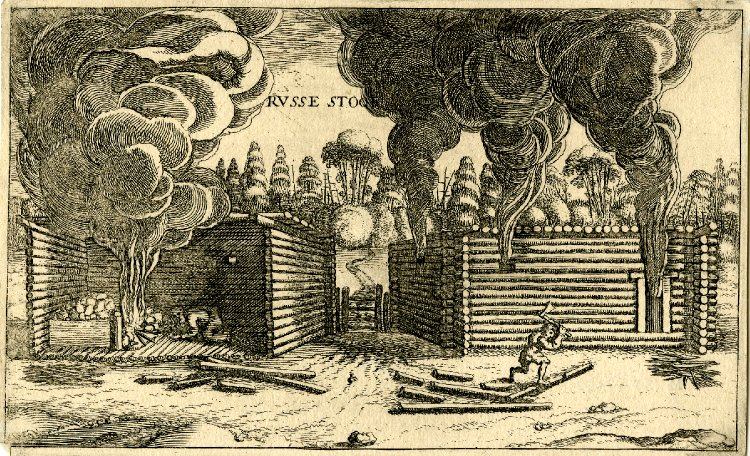
A 17th-century kurnaya izba without a chimney

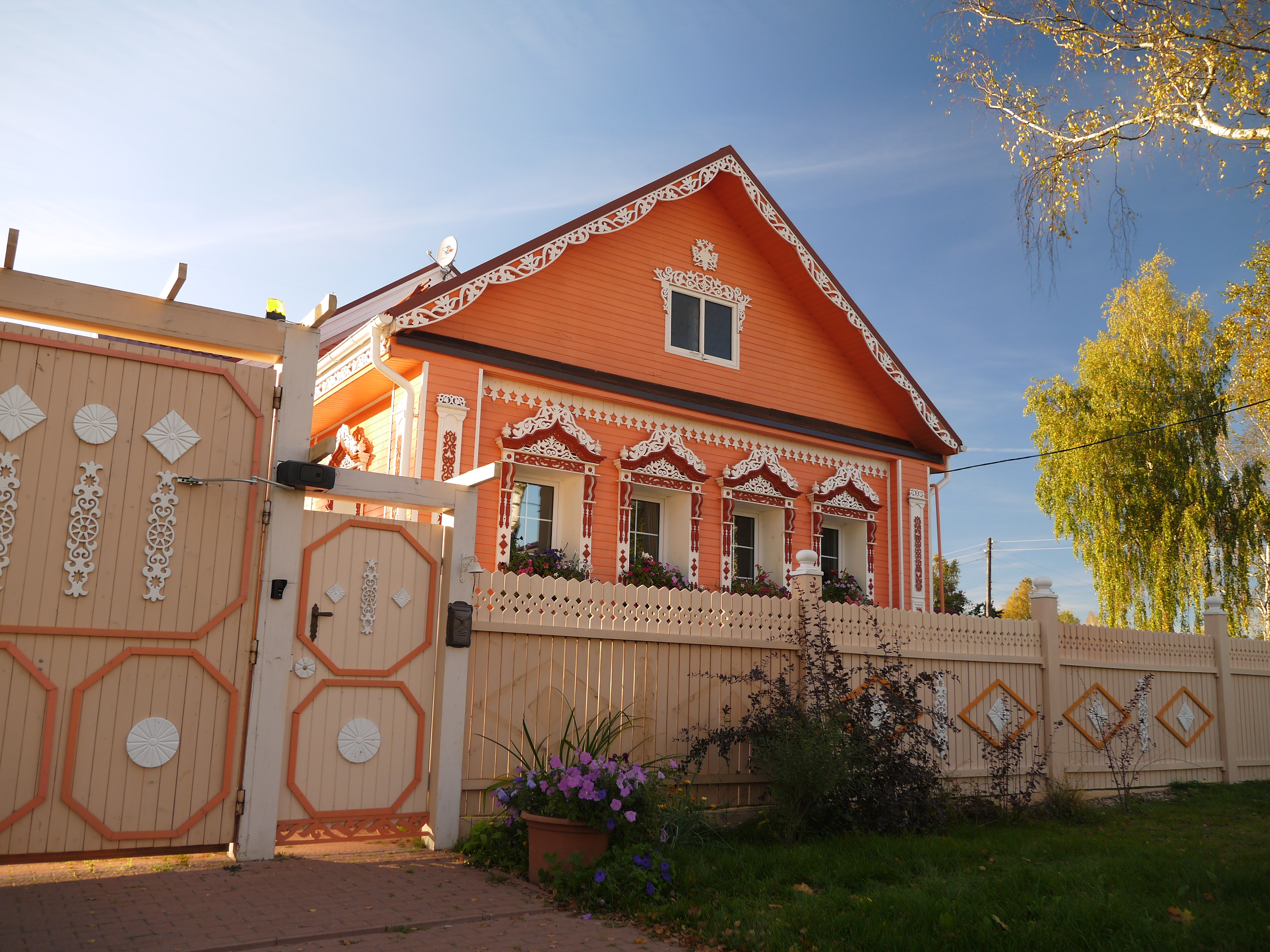
A rebuilt izba in Vyatskoye, Yaroslavl Oblast, Russia

An izba (Russian: изба́, IPA: [ɪzˈba]) is a traditional Russian countryside dwelling.

Often a log house, it forms the living quarters of a conventional Russian farmstead. It is generally built close to the road and inside a yard, which also encloses a kitchen garden, hay shed, and barn.

== Etymology ==
The word izba is derived from the Old Russian word istba (истъба), which itself derives from the Proto-Slavic word *jьstъba (cf. Proto-Germanic *stuba), meaning a "heated living space" or "sauna". It is also known as a khata (хата) in southern Russia, Belarus, and Ukraine.

According to the historian Geoffrey Hosking, starting in the eighteenth century, the khata was used to refer to cottages on the tree-poor southern steppes that used logs only for their frames, with wattle-and-daub infill covered by plaster and whitewash. However, generally this wattle-and-daub house is called mazanka (мазанка) and a khata is not necessarily a mazanka.

== Description ==
The northern Russian izba was made of hewn logs and it tended to be relatively large, owing to the abundance of timber and the generally larger size of households. Because of the climate, it was built high off the ground. Its cellar (podklet) extended about one to three meters below ground level. The izba also had a saddleback roof with two slopes.

The southern Russian izba was likewise made of hewn logs, but it was typically built over a shallow cellar (podpol). Some lacked a cellar altogether. It also typically had a hip roof with four slopes. Compared to the northern Russian izba, it was less elaborately decorated, though it was more often painted than carved.

== History ==
The dominant building material of Russian vernacular architecture, and material culture generally, for centuries was wood. Specifically houses were made from locally-cut rough-hewn logs, with little or no stone, metal, or glass. Even churches and urban buildings were primarily wooden until the eighteenth century.

From the fifteenth century onward, the central element of the interior of an izba was the Russian stove, which could occupy up to one quarter of the floorspace in smaller dwellings.

A village house with a dormer, common in rural areas across former Russian Empire

By 19th century, various enterprises and the Department of Agriculture were publishing collections of standardized designs to simplify the development of rural areas, remote settlements and general private sector, demand for which supposedly increased after emancipated serfs entered the economy. Often builds featured in these catalogues were inspired by Russian Revival architecture movement and designed to resemble traditional Russian wooden architecture, including modern interpretations of Izba with additional variety. While there's no official name for houses built in that style, they're commonly referred to simply as "Village house" (Russian: Деревенский дом, romanized: Derevenskiy dom) or "Rural house" (Russian: Сельский дом, romanized: Sel'skiy dom).

== See also ==
- Log building

== Sources ==
- Galloway, David J. (28 October 2013) [2007]. "Izba". Encyclopaedia of Contemporary Russian. Routledge. p. 278. ISBN 978-1-136-78786-7.
- Hosking, Geoffrey A. (2001). Russia and the Russians: A History. Harvard University Press. ISBN 978-0-674-00473-3.
- Smirnitskaya, Ye. V. (2008). "Изба". Большая российская энциклопедия. Том 10: Железное дерево — Излучение (in Russian). Большая российская энциклопедия. pp. 736–738. ISBN 978-5-85270-341-5. Archived from the original on 24 April 2026.
- Vucinich, Wayne S.; Curtiss, John Shelton (1968). The Peasant in Nineteenth-Century Russia. Stanford University Press. ISBN 978-0-8047-0638-4.
