= The History of Cities and Villages of the Ukrainian SSR =

The History of Cities and Villages of the Ukrainian SSR (Ukrainian: Історія міст і сіл Української РСР) is a Ukrainian encyclopedia, published in 26 volumes. It provides knowledge about the history of all populated places in Ukraine.

It was approved by the Communist Party of Ukraine in 1962 and published for the first time the very same year. The chief editor was the noted scholar and historian Petro Tronko.

This is the first thorough historical work of its kind. Each volume covered the history of all populated places in different regions of Ukraine, and at that time they numbered almost 40,000. The encyclopedia played an important role in collecting materials for writing essays about the villages. The encyclopedia was compiled by the State Historical Library of Ukraine together with the NASU Institute of History of Ukraine (part of the National Academy of Sciences of Ukraine, NASU). The publication of History of towns and villages of the Ukrainian SSR was also published in Russian.

There were published 26 volumes of the encyclopedia (one for each region of Ukraine). In addition, there are also ten more volumes that were published separately in the Russian language.

== Volumes ==
1. The history of cities and towns of the Ukrainian SSR: Kyiv. - K.: Ch. edit. URE Academy of Sciences of UkrSSR, 1968.
2. The history of cities and villages of the Ukrainian SSR: Vinnytsia Oblast. - K.: Home Edition URE AN UkrSSR, 1972. - 630 pp.
3. The history of cities and villages of the Ukrainian SSR. Volyn Oblast. - K.: Home Edition URE AN UkrSSR, 1970. - 745 pp.
4. History of towns and villages of the Ukrainian SSR. Dnipropetrovsk Oblast. - K.: Home Edition URE AN UkrSSR, 1971.
5. The history of cities and villages of the Ukrainian SSR. Donetsk Oblast. - K.: URE Home Edition UkrSSR, 1970.
6. The history of cities and villages of the Ukrainian SSR. Zhytomyr Oblast. - K.: Home Edition URE AN UkrSSR, 1973.
7. The history of cities and villages of the Ukrainian SSR. Zakarpattia Oblast. - K.: Home Edition URE USSR.
8. The history of cities and villages of the Ukrainian SSR. Zaporizhzhia Oblast. - K.: Home Edition URE AN UkrSSR, 1970. - 765 pp.
9. History of towns and villages of the Ukrainian SSR. Ivano-Frankivsk Oblast. - K.: Home Edition URE AN UkrSSR, 1971. - 639 pp.
10. The history of cities and villages of the Ukrainian SSR. Kyiv Oblast / FM Ruditsch (Chairman edit. Board) and others. - K.: Ch. edit. URE, 1971. - 792 pp.
11. The history of cities and villages of the Ukrainian SSR. Kirovohrad Oblast. - K.: Home Edition URE AN UkrSSR, 1972.
12. The history of cities and villages of the Ukrainian SSR. Crimean Oblast. - K.: Home Edition URE AN UkrSSR, 1971.
13. The history of cities and villages of the Ukrainian SSR. Luhansk Oblast. - K.: Home Edition URE AN UkrSSR, 1968.
14. The history of cities and villages of the Ukrainian SSR. Lviv Oblast. - K.: Home Edition URE AN UkrSSR, 1968.
15. The history of cities and villages of the Ukrainian SSR. Mykolaiv Oblast. - K.: Home Edition URE AN UkrSSR, 1971.
16. The history of cities and villages of the Ukrainian SSR. Odesa Oblast. - K.: Home Edition URE AN UkrSSR, 1969. - 697 pp.
17. The history of cities and villages of the Ukrainian SSR. Poltava Oblast. - K.: Home Edition URE AN UkrSSR, 1967. - 352 pp.
18. The history of cities and villages of the Ukrainian SSR. Rivne Oblast. - K.: Home Edition URE AN UkrSSR, 1973.
19. The history of cities and villages of the Ukrainian SSR. Sumy Oblast. - K.: Home Edition URE AN UkrSSR, 1967.
20. The history of cities and villages of the Ukrainian SSR. Ternopil Oblast. - K.: Home Edition URE AN UkrSSR, 1973. - 370 pp.
21. The history of cities and villages of the Ukrainian SSR. Kharkiv Oblast. - K: Home Edition URE AN UkrSSR, 1967. - 405 pp.
22. The history of cities and villages of the Ukrainian SSR. Kherson Oblast. - K.: Home Edition URE AN UkrSSR, 1971.
23. The history of cities and villages of the Ukrainian SSR. Khmelnytskyi Oblast. - K.: Home Edition URE AN UkrSSR, 1971. - 707 pp.
24. The history of cities and villages of the Ukrainian SSR. Cherkasy Oblast. - K.: Home Edition URE AN UkrSSR, 1972 .- 788 pp.
25. The history of cities and villages of the Ukrainian SSR. Chernihiv Oblast. - K.: Home Edition URE AN UkrSSR, 1972 .- 697 pp.
26. The history of cities and villages of the Ukrainian SSR. Chernivtsi Oblast. - K.: Home Edition URE AN UkrSSR, 1969.

== See also ==
- Geography of Ukraine
- ISO 3166-2:UA
- List of places named after people (Ukraine)
