= Petro Tronko =

Ukrainian academician

Hero of Ukraine Petro Tronko
- Петро Тронько
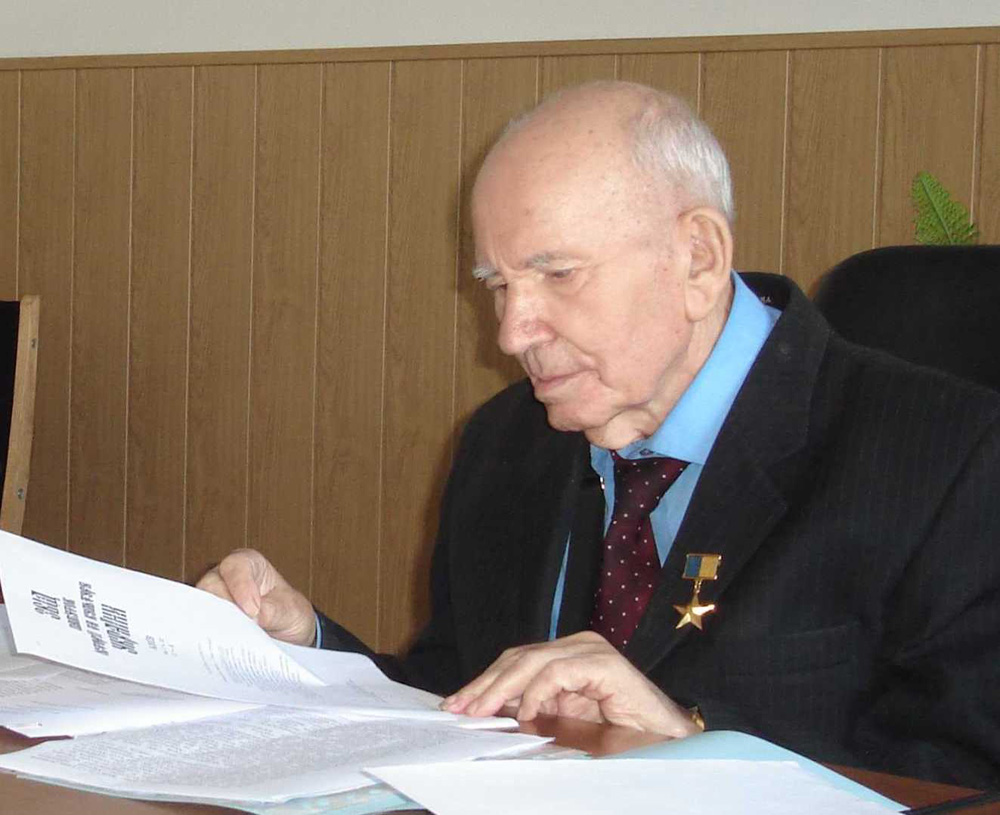
- Tronko in 2014
- Born: 12 July 1915; Zabrody, Kharkov Governorate, Russian Empire
- Died: 12 September 2021 (aged 106); Kyiv, Ukraine
- Burial place: Baikove Cemetery
- Occupations: Historian, academician of the National Academy of Sciences of Ukraine
- Known for: Veteran of World War II

Petro Tymofiiovych Tronko (Ukrainian: Петро Тимофійович Тронько; 12 July 1915 – 12 September 2011) was a Ukrainian academician of the National Academy of Sciences of Ukraine and veteran of World War II.

Tronko was the head of the editorial collegium for the 26-volume encyclopedia on The History of Cities and Villages of the Ukrainian SSR.

== Early life and career ==
Born during World War I in 1915 to a peasant family in Sloboda Ukraine, Tronko started to work in 1932 in mines of Dzerzhynsk. Eventually, after finishing some teaching classes, he worked as a teacher of social sciences and the Ukrainian language in the village school of Bohodukhiv Raion and as director of Lebedyn children's home. Since 1937, he worked in Komsomol and in 1939 joined the Communist Party of Soviet Union.

In 1939, Tronko was a member of the Western Ukrainian People's Assembly that voted in for the Western Ukraine to join the Ukrainian SSR. During World War II, he was a member of the South-western, Stalingrad, Southern, 4th Ukrainian fronts, participated in the defense of Kyiv and Stalingrad and later in the liberation of Rostov, Donbas, Left-bank Ukraine, and Kyiv. One of the first, Tronko entered the liberated Kyiv on 6 November 1943 as a major and was appointed the first secretary of the city and regional Komsomol organization. In 1947, he was dismissed from the position due to accusations of Lazar Kaganovich in "nationalistic perversions".

== Post-war ==
His dismissal from Komsomol work, Tronko used for education and in 1948, he graduated from the Historical faculty of Kyiv University. The same year, Tronko enrolled into aspirantura of the Academy of Social Sciences (today the Russian Presidential Academy of National Economy and Public Administration) of the Central Committee of the Communist Party of the Soviet Union defending his dissertation in three years.

From 1951 to 1960, Tronko worked for the Kyiv regional committee of the Communist Party of Ukraine and from 1960 to 1961 he headed the department of propaganda and ideological agitation for the party. During the next 17 years (1961–1978), Tronko worked as a Deputy Chairman of the Council of Ministers of the Ukrainian SSR taking care of matters on culture, education, healthcare, press, book publishing, cinema, radio and television broadcasting, social sciences and archives. He was a member of Verkhovna Rada for nine convocations.

In 1968, Tronko defended his doctorate dissertation "Ukrainian people in the fight against Hitlerites occupiers during the Great Patriotic War (1941–1945)".

In 1969, Tronko initiated the creation of Pyrohiv skansen that was opened in 1976.

== In independent Ukraine ==
He was a deputy of the Verkhovna Rada of Ukraine. He was an advisor to the President Leonid Kuchma on the preservation of historical heritage.

Shortly before his death, he suffered a stroke. He was buried in Kyiv on the central alley of Baikove Cemetery.

A memorial plaque was installed in his honor, in his native village. In 2015, in Kyiv, the nameless passage between Zabolotny Street and the Pyrohiv Museum was named after academician Tronko.
