= Pyrohiv =

Residental neighbourhood in Kyiv

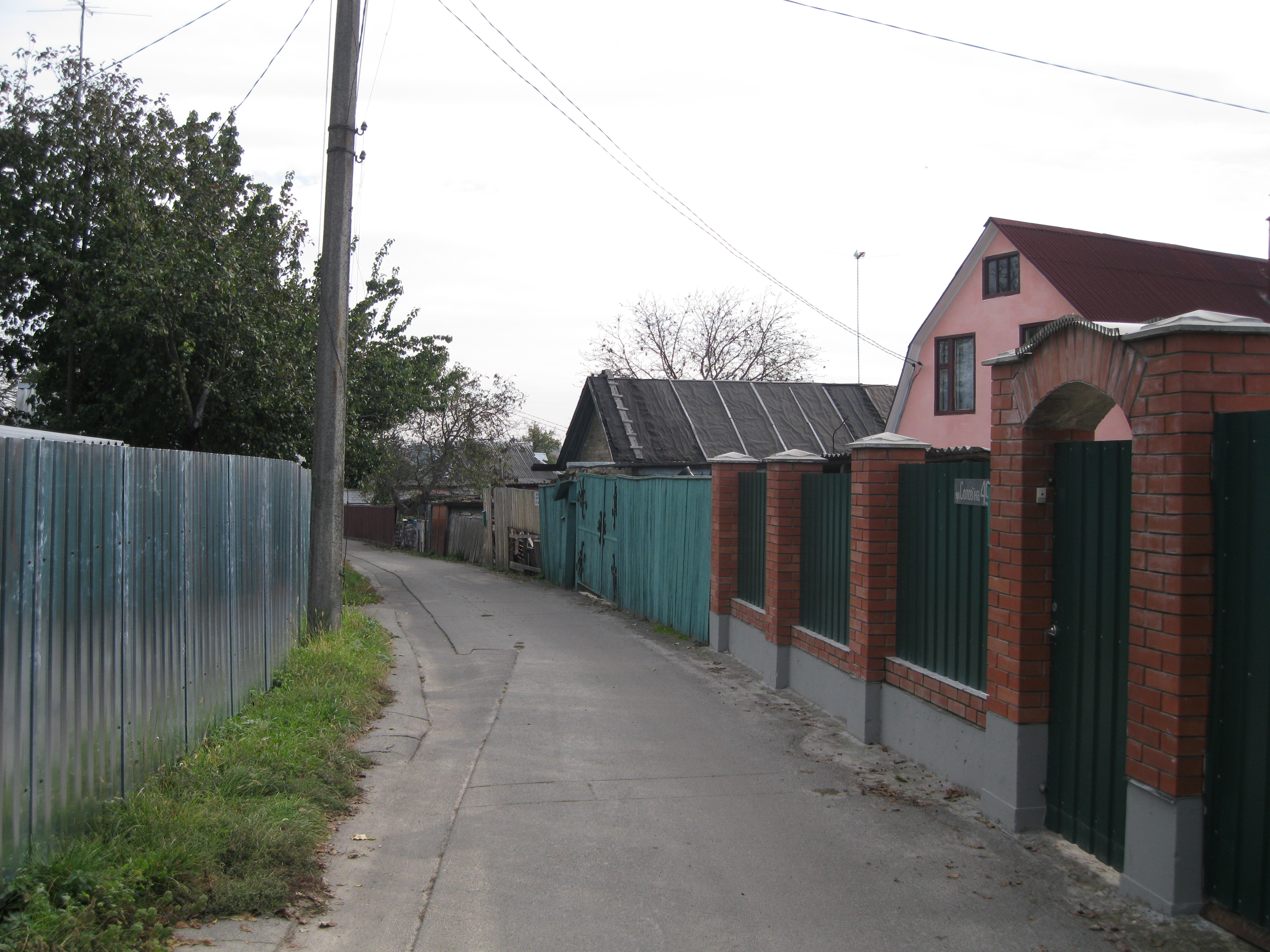
Soloviina street, near the Museum of Folk Architecture

Pyrohiv (Ukrainian: Пирогів) is a former village, now a residential neighborhood, on the southern outskirts of Kyiv. It is located between Korchuvate, Kytaiv, and Vita-Lytovska neighbourhoods. The main streets are Pyrohivsky Shlyach and Laureatska. It is currently part of the city's Holosiivskyi District.

National Museum of Folk Architecture and Folkways of Ukraine is located in the neighbourhood. Other notable places include small Pyrohiv Cemetery with the Church of the Exaltation of the Holy Cross, exposures of Neogene and Paleogene stone deposits and Secondary School №150.

The neighbourhood is served by Kyivpastrans bus route 27, and trolleybus 11, which terminates near the entrance to the museum.

== History ==
Territory of the settlement was inhabited since at least the Bronze Age, with objects belonging to that time period being found in the area. Pyrohiv (Pyrohivka) was first mentioned in 1627 as a property of the Kyiv-Pechersk Lavra. The origin of the name has not been established. In 1720 it appears as a village. After secularization in 1786, the village was transferred to state ownership. In 1821, the stone Vozdvizhenska church was built at the expense of titular councilor I. Zuyevich, which was destroyed in the 1930s. Historically, the village was part of the Khotiv Volost of the Kiev Uezd.

According to Dominique de la Flise, in 1854 the village had 33 yards and 301 inhabitants. The Kalynivka River, a tributary of the Dnipro, flowed through the village, and there existed Lake Babky. There also was a dam and a water mill on the river.

In 1900, there were 178 yards and 1222 inhabitants. There was a one-class folk school and four brick factories. There were also four forges and two water mills. Water mills also operated in the villages of Sirakiv and Yarovka, adjacent to the village.

In 1926, the village had 337 yards and 1,738 inhabitants, from 1923 to 1927 the village was part of the Budaiiv District of the Kyiv Okruga. In 1927, the district was liquidated, and the village with the village council was directly subordinated to the Kyiv City Council. In 1926, the Pirohiv village council included: the village of Pirohiv, the hamlets of Vilnyy, Volodarka, Novoselytsia, Cherkasiv, forest guards of Bychki and Zhukiv island.

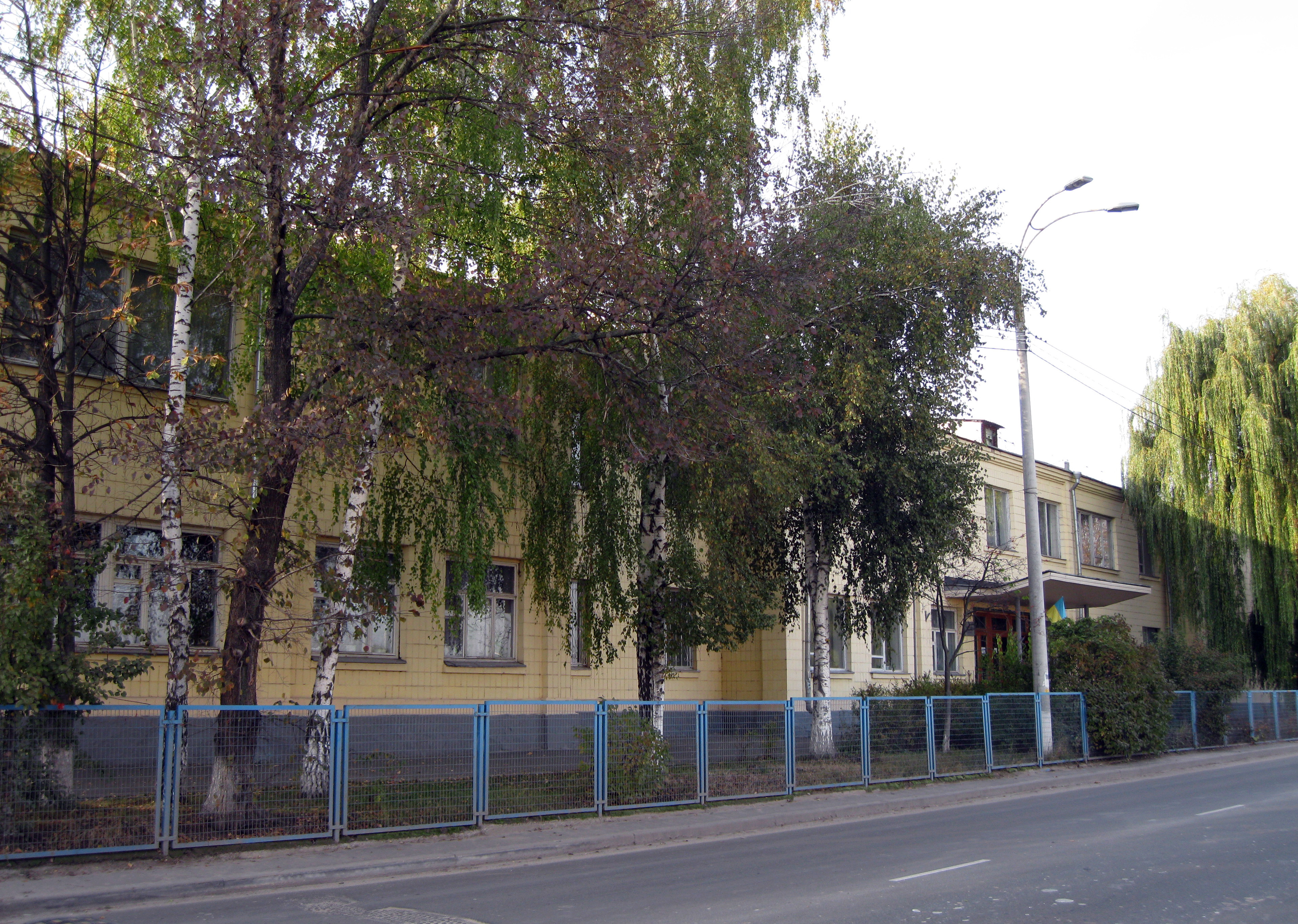
Pyrohiv Secondary School №150

The village was annexed into the city limits in 1957.

Until 1957, when the Executive Committee of the Kyiv City Council of Workers' Deputies assigned names to the streets, the village was divided into "corners": Khreshchatyk (central part), Kovtunivshchyna (the current Barikadna Street), Sorokova Gora (the beginning of the current Laureatska Street), Honcharivska Gora (the western part of the village ), Yarovtsi (the northern outskirts of the village, now partly the territory of the Museum of Folk Architecture), Zhabokrukivka (the eastern part of the village, the current Festivalna Street; part of the corner, between Pyrohivskyi Shlyah Street and the railway, was demolished in the 1980s, now there is a tobacco factory), Tsyganshchyna (southern part of the village, current Komunalna Street) and Borzakiv (southern part of the village, final part of Pyrohivsky Shlyach Street).

== Sources ==
- Список населенных мест Киевской губернии / Издание Киевского губернского статистического комитета. — Киев : типографія Ивановой, аренд. А. Л. Попов, 1900. — 1976 p.
- S. Shyrochyn, O. Mykhailyk. Unknown peripheries of Kyiv. Holosiivskyi district. — Kyiv: Sky Horse, 2019. — 296 p.
- The official website of Holosiivska District Administration
