= Grigoriy Hansburg =

Musicologist from Ukraine

- Григорій Ганзбург
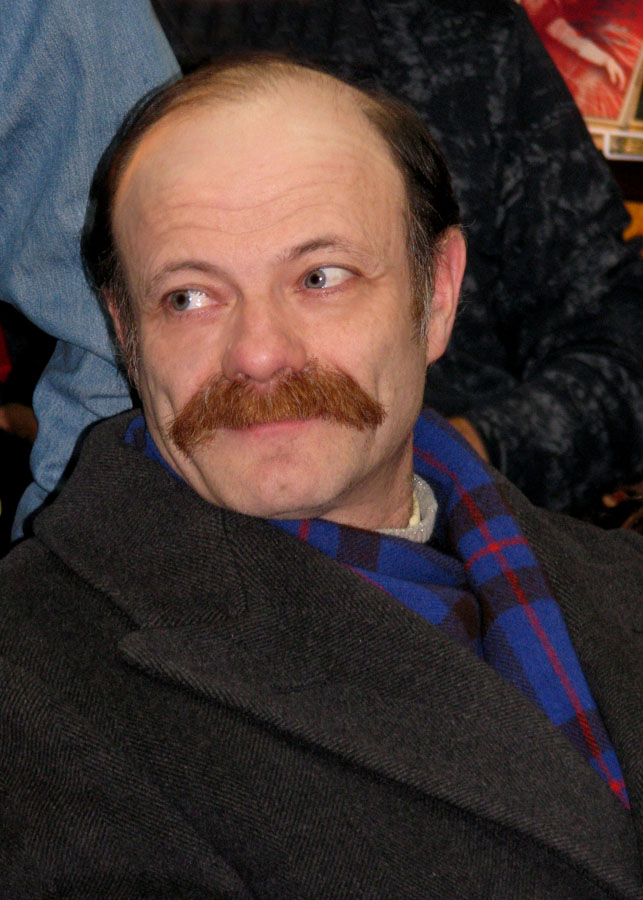
- Born: September 25, 1954 (age 71); Kharkiv, Ukrainian SSR
- Education: Kharkiv National University of Arts
- Occupations: Musicologist, educator, music critic, pianist
- Notable work: Books on F. Schubert, R. Schumann, S. Rachmaninoff, E. Kulmann
- Parents: I. G. Hansburg (father); Alexandra Hansburg (mother)

Grigoriy Hansburg (born 25 September 1954) is a Ukrainian musicologist, educator, and music critic. Ph.D. He also performs as a pianist.

== Biography ==
Hansburg graduated from the Kharkiv National University of Arts named after Ivan Kotlyarevsky (historical-theoretical faculty) in 1978 under the class of L. M. Bulgakov. He also studied under G. O. Tyumeneva (music history, folklore), M. D. Tits (polyphony, history of music-theoretical systems, teaching methodology), O. V. Gusarova (analysis of musical works), Z. B. Yuferova (history of foreign music, musical bibliography), M. R. Cherkashina (contemporary music, pedagogical practice), and V. S. Bibik (instrumentation, score reading). He received his initial education as a pianist under L. G. Feigina, S. E. Grossman, and B. Yu. Yukht; he graduated from the Kharkiv Secondary Special Music School in 1973 under the class of I. M. Dubinin (music theory) and N. S. Tishko (music history).

== Career ==
From 1978 to 1985, he was a teacher at the Poltava Music College. From 1984, he taught at the Kharkiv Music College , becoming a teacher of higher category in 1998 and teacher-methodologist in 2006. From 1984 to 2009 (with interruptions), he was a teacher at the Kharkiv State Institute (University) of Arts; from 2013, he has been a member of the Specialized Academic Council for Thesis Defense at KhNUA. His dissertation was "The Song Theater of Robert Schumann" (scientific supervisor M. R. Cherkashina-Gubarenko), completed at the Department of History of Foreign Music at the National Music Academy of Ukraine (Kyiv). From 1992 to 2002, he was the scientific director of the International Music Festival "Kharkiv Assemblies". From 1993, he has been the director of the Institute of Musicology. From 2013, he is a member of the Specialized Academic Council (K 64.871.01) at Kharkiv National University of Arts named after I. P. Kotlyarevsky.

== Achievements ==
In 1976, he introduced the direction of musicology known as librettology (the science of the verbal component of musical works). In 1996, he developed and introduced the course "Musical Local Studies". He is the compiler of the curriculum on music criticism. In 1997, he presented a report at the anniversary Schubert conference in Vienna (the only representative from Ukraine). He is the author of the cultural concept "Resistance to Evil through Art", which became the motto of the International Music Festival "Kharkiv Assemblies" from 2004. He has more than 200 publications in scientific collections and periodicals. He is the author of books on the music of F. Schubert, R. Schumann, S. Rachmaninoff, and A. Dargomyzhsky. He is the editor-compiler of the yearbook "Kharkiv Assemblies" (1992–1995) and 28 scientific collections. He has also published archival documents about many composers and writers. He is the editor of original editions of scores by composers such as Handel, Schubert, Schumann, Dvořák (with equirhythmic translations of vocal texts), and new works by Borisov, M. Karminsky, V. Ivanov, and others. He is the author of musical works, mainly vocal and choral, including "Psalm No. 136" on poems by T. Shevchenko for mixed choir, and solo songs on poems by M. Tsvetaeva, O. Mandelstam, B. Pasternak, S. Cherkasenko, and L. Pervomaisky. He is the author and host of TV and radio programs. He was the chairman of the editorial board of the journal "Istoki" (1997–2002). He is a member of the editorial board of the scientific journal "Bulletin of the Saratov Conservatory. Issues of Art Studies" and the editorial board of the International Department of the scientific journal "IKONI/ICONI: Art. Culture. Education. Scientific Research". He is the author of articles in the Ukrainian Musical Encyclopedia and the Encyclopedia of Modern Ukraine.

== Public activity ==
He is a member of the National Union of Composers of Ukraine (since 1989), the Union of Composers of the former USSR (since 1990), the Union of Composers of Russia (since 2009); the National All-Ukrainian Musical Union (since 1992); and the National Union of Journalists of Ukraine (since 2011). He is the co-founder and vice-president of the Association of Creative Intelligentsia "Krug" (since 1993). He is the co-founder of the Kharkiv Foundation for Support of Young Talents (1994). He is the president of the Schubert Society in Kharkiv (since 1996). He is the co-founder and member of the Board of the Charitable Foundation "Kharkiv Assemblies" (since 2012). He is a member of juries for professional competitions, including the First and Second All-Ukrainian Vocalists Competition "World Classics in Ukrainian" (2017, 2019).

== Awards ==
Laureate of the Municipal Prize named after I. I. Slatin (1997); laureate of the Grand Prize of the Kharkiv Regional State Administration and Kharkiv Regional Council in the field of culture and art (2014); winner of the journalistic competition "Chasopys" in the nomination "Cultural Space" (2020).

== Family ==
Father — trombonist I. G. Hansburg (1923–1995)

== Publications ==
=== Books and brochures ===
"Elisaveta Kulman" (1997) "Articles on Schubert" (1997) "Articles on the Poetess Elisaveta Kulman" (1998) "Music Journalism and Criticism" (1999) "Your Child and Music" (2006) "Poem by A. S. Pushkin 'October 19, 1827' and Its Interpretation in the Music of A. S. Dargomyzhsky" (2007) "Theatricalization in Vocal Cycles of Robert Schumann" (2012) "On Rachmaninoff's Music" (2015) "On the Writer under the Pseudonym S. Sviridenko" (2021) "Chronological Index of Literature on the Poetess Elizaveta Kulman" (2021) "Tchaikovsky's Fatum-Chord" (2021) "The Song Theater of Robert Schumann" (2022) "On the Poetess Elisaveta Kulman. Essays" (2025).

=== Compiled editions ===
Collections of materials "Kharkiv Assemblies" (1992–1995) "Schubert and Schubertianism" (1994) "F. Mendelssohn-Bartholdy and Traditions of Musical Professionalism" (1995) "Robert Schumann and the Crossroads of Music and Literature" (1997) "Isichenko-Burtseva T. N. Notes of an Opera Singer" (1999) "Memories of Mark Karminsky" (2000) "Ferenc Liszt and Problems of Synthesis of Arts" (2002) "Opera by Claudio Monteverdi 'Orfeo'" (2007) Collections "From Music-Pedagogical Experience" (2008) "Problems of Interaction of Art, Pedagogy, and Theory and Practice of Education" (issues 36, 38, 39, 42, 45) "Stellar Hour of the University of Arts" (2012) "Aspects of Historical Musicology" (issues X, 11) "Myshkis E. D. My Five Lives" (2019)

=== Articles ===
More than 50 articles, including:

- "New Textbook on Harmony" (1981),
- "On the Question of Theatrical Choir" (1987),
- "On Librettology" (1990),
- "Three Approaches to Musical Heritage" (1997),
- "The Song Theater of Robert Schumann" (2005),
- "Rachmaninoff's Stylistic Crisis" (2005),
- "Fatum-Chord in Tchaikovsky's Music" (2007),
- "Theatricalization of Chamber Genres in R. Schumann's Vocal Music" (2010),
- "Spatial Effects in Music Sound" (2020).

=== Folklore collections ===
"Ukrainian Folk Songs with Notes" (2002–2009, several issues) "Russian Folk Songs with Notes" (2003–2007, several issues)

=== Sheet music editions ===
Works by W. Mozart, F. Schubert, F. Mendelssohn-Bartholdy, M. Karminsky, V. Ivanov, G. Hansburg (songs, choral works), G. Purcell, G. Rossini, J. S. Bach, G. Mahler, and others.
