= Arkanov =

Arkanov (Russian: Арканов) is a Russian masculine surname derived from the given name Arkady; its feminine counterpart is Arkanova. The surname may refer to the following notable people:

- Arkady Arkanov (1933–2015), Russian writer, playwright and stand-up comedian
- Valentyna Arkanova (1934–2013), Soviet singer
