= Lezhnev =

Lezhnev (masculine, Russian: Лежнев) or Lezhneva (feminine, Russian: Лежнева) is a Russian surname. Notable people with the surname include:

- Julia Lezhneva (born 1989), Russian soprano opera singer and recitalist
- Olga Lezhneva (born 1983), Ukrainian actress
