= Valentyna Arkanova =

Ukrainian music educator (1934–2013)

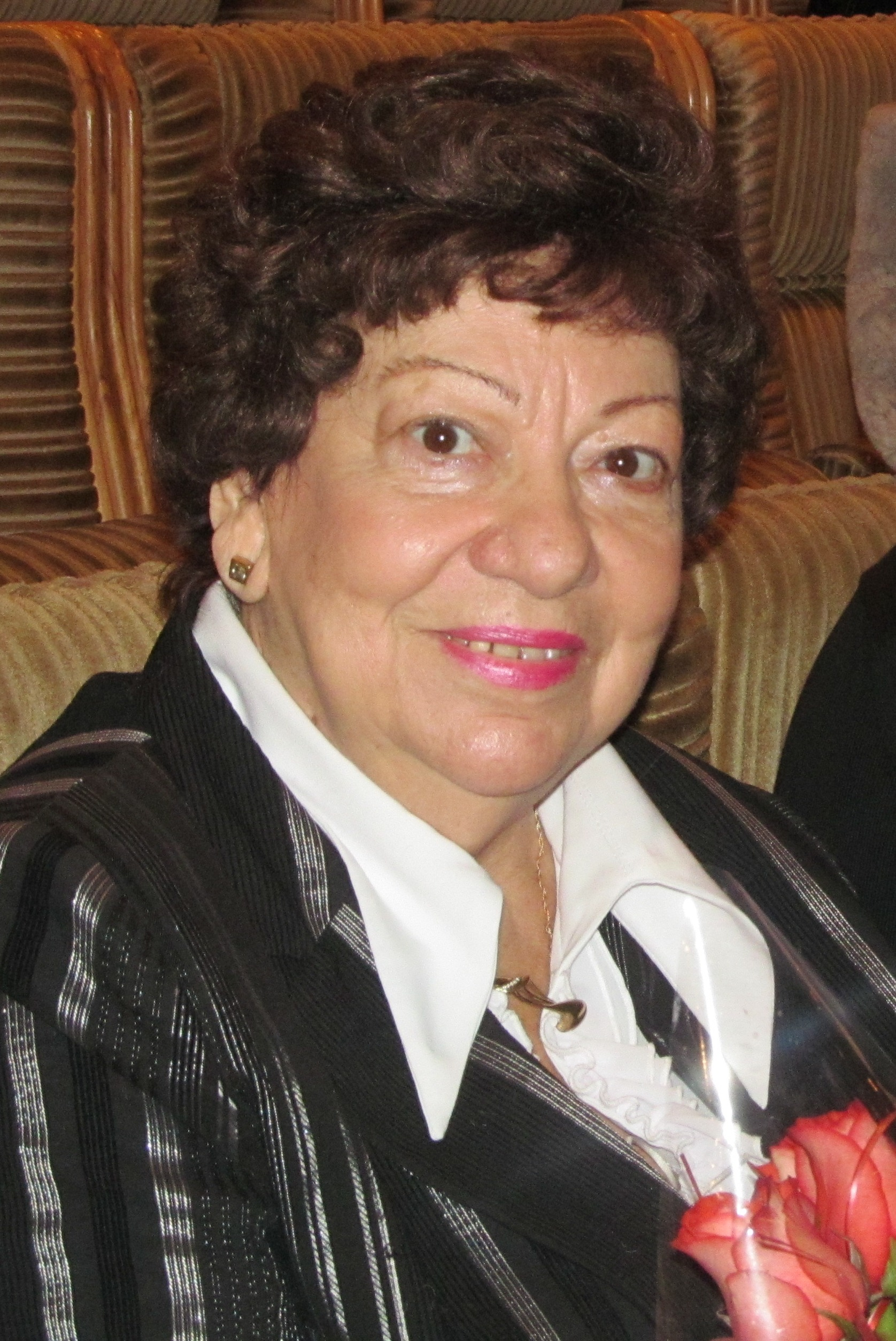
Valentyna Arkanova

Valentyna Fyodorovna Arkanova (Ukrainian: Валентина Федорівна Арканова; 5 February 1934, in Kherson – 12 June 2013, in Kharkiv) was a Soviet and Ukrainian singer, coloratura soprano, and teacher. In 1968, she was awarded People's Artist of the Ukrainian SSR. She was awarded the Order of Princess Olga.

== Life ==
In 1957, she graduated from Kharkiv Conservatory, where she studied with L. E. Kurylenko.

Beginning in 1956, she was a soloist at Kharkiv Opera and Ballet Theater.

In 1971, she was lecturer at Kharkiv Institute of Arts. In 1978, she was associate professor, and then Professor at the Kharkiv National Kotlyarevsky University of Arts.

She was a member Inter-Regional Branch of the National Union of Theater Workers of Ukraine. In 1994, she was on the jury of the Solomiya Krushelnytska Opera Singers Competition.
