= Oksana Dmitriieva =

Ukrainian puppet theatre director

Oksana Fedorivna Dmitrieva
- Оксана Федорівна Дмітрієва
- Born: August 22, 1977; Kramatorsk, Ukraine
- Occupations: puppet theater director, actress, playwright, theater critic, photographer, graphic artist
- Awards: Honored Artist of the Autonomous Republic of Crimea (2006)

Oksana Fedorivna Dmitrieva (Ukrainian: Оксана Федорівна Дмітрієва; born August 22, 1977) is a Ukrainian puppet theater director, chief director of the Kharkiv Puppet Theater, actress, playwright, theater critic, photographer, and graphic artist. She is an Honored Artist of the Autonomous Republic of Crimea (2006).

== Biography ==
Oksana Dmitriieva graduated from Dnipropetrovsk Theater and Art College in 1998 with a degree in Puppet Theater, after which she immediately received an invitation to the Crimean Puppet Theater under the direction of director Boris Azarov in Simferopol). During her work in this theater she played in 17 performances and participated in international festivals. From 2004 to 2007 she was the director of this theater.

From 2001 to 2006, Oksana Dmitriieva studied by correspondence at the Ivan Kotlyarevsky Kharkiv Institute of Arts at two faculties at once – theater studies and puppet theater directing. Her first directorial works were "Balaganchik" and "The Love of Don Perimplin."

In 2006, she was awarded the honorary title of "Honored Artist of the Autonomous Republic of Crimea."

In 2007, she graduated with a master's degree from the Kyiv National I. K. Karpenko-Kary Theatre, Cinema and Television University. In the same year, two works by the director were presented at the Ivano-Frankivsk Festival "Oberehy:" "Wings for Thumbelina" (Poltava Puppet Theater) and the play "The Love of Don Perimplin."

Oksana Dmitriieva has been working at the Kharkiv Puppet Theater since 2007. First, as a director with a rehearsal of "The Magic Ring," and after the production, she received an invitation to take the position of director of the theater. Most of the works in the theater were realized in tandem with the main artist of the theater Natalia Denisova.

Oksana Dmitriieva has more than 30 roles on stage in her arsenal. She has staged more than 20 performances on the stages of Ukrainian theaters. She is a winner of international competitions and festivals.

Dimitriieva lives and works in Kharkiv.

== Посилання ==
- Оксана Дмітрієва на сайті Харківського театру ляльок
- Оксана Дмітрієва на порталі «Театральна риболовля»
