= Boris Sevastyanov =

Ukrainian singer and composer (born 1983)

Borys Sevastianov
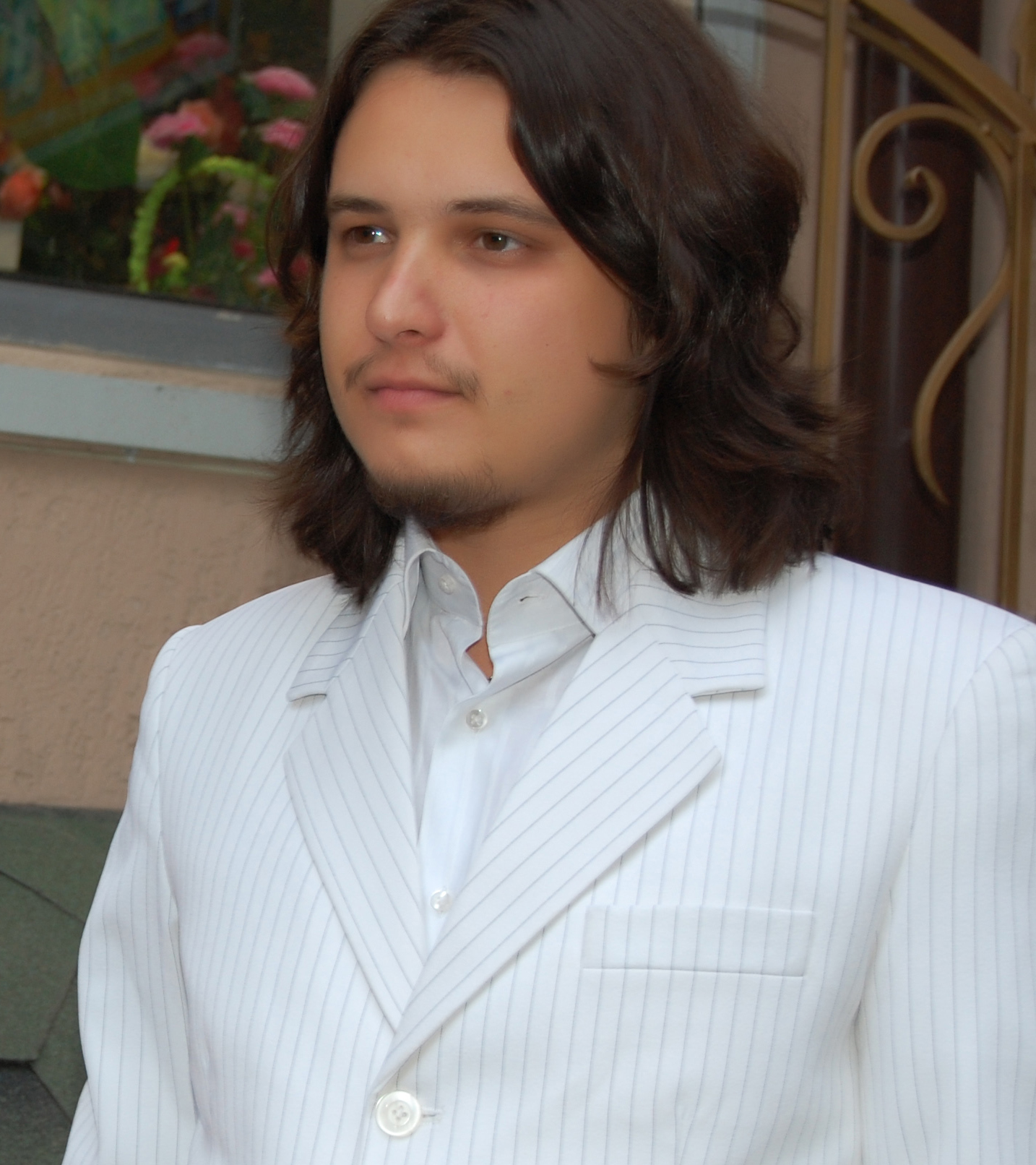
- Portrait of Borys Sevastianov

Background information
- Born: Borys Oleksandrovych Sevastianov; 1 April 1983 (age 43); Kharkiv, Ukrainian SSR, Soviet Union
- Occupations: Composer; Singer

Borys Oleksandrovych Sevastianov (Ukrainian: Борис Олександрович Севастьянов; born 1 April 1983), also known by the Russian spelling Boris Sevastyanov (Russian: Борис Александрович Севастьянов), is a Ukrainian singer and music composer.

He is known for songs such as That's Baby Ruscism, Grady, and Take Me Back, Mom. He has stated that his music is heavily influenced by the Russo-Ukrainian War.

== Biography ==
Borys Sevastianov began writing music in early childhood. He studied at the Kharkiv Lyceum of Arts, as well as secondary schools No. 111 and No. 152. He studied composition and piano from a young age. In 2003, he graduated from the Kharkiv Music School, specializing in Music Theory in the class of composer Volodymyr Ptushkin. In 2008, he graduated from the Kharkiv National Kotlyarevsky University of Arts with a degree in Composition from the class of Volodymyr Zolotukhin.

From 2010 to 2012, he worked as an arranger for the Yaroslav Mudryi National Law University Wind Orchestra. Between 2012 and 2015, he collaborated as an arranger with the "Virtuosos of Slobozhanshchyna" symphony orchestra.

Since the summer of 2014, he has regularly traveled to the ATO zone as a volunteer and performer, giving approximately 600 concerts for military and civilian audiences. He participates in many charity concerts and festivals. He is the composer of the song "Prayer" (lyrics by Dzvinka Torokhtushko), which is considered the unofficial hymn of modern military chaplains.

In September 2017, he published the novel Monk, the events of which take place in the ATO zone and modern Kharkiv. In 2020, the NAONI orchestra performed his instrumental piece "Morning Rain".

In May 2021, the musical The Chronicles of Narnia: The Mystery of the Easter Code was staged in Kharkiv. In September 2023, his musical PinocchiA was staged at the Kyiv Municipal Academic Opera and Ballet Theatre for Children and Youth.

His works include piano and viola concertos, a symphony, and numerous instrumental and vocal pieces. He has frequently performed his own works as a pianist. He has composed music for documentaries and films (Ukraine, Russia, Germany, USA), TV shows, and computer games, in addition to writing songs and arrangements. He has recorded songs with the groups TaRUTA, Haydamaky, and P@p@ Karlo, as well as with singer Ivan Ganzera and poet Dmytro Lazutkin. He is the author of the anthem for the fans of FC Metalist Kharkiv, "We are fans of Metalist".

He is the founder of the Online School of Composition and Arrangement. By Decree of the President of Ukraine No. 336/2016 of 19 August 2016, he was awarded the jubilee medal "25 years of independence of Ukraine".

His wife, Yulia Sevastianova, is a cellist. They have a daughter, Dana, born in 2016.

== Discography ==
Albums

- That's Baby Ruscism (2014)
- Romantic Piano Music (2019)
- Epic Uplifting Music (2022)

== Controversies ==
Several citizens in Russia have been prosecuted for publishing Borys Sevastianov's song "That's Baby Ruscism" on social networks.

His songs "Take Me Back, Mom" and "Magadan" are included in the list of extremist materials of the Ministry of Justice of the Russian Federation under numbers 4888 and 4889.
