= Valentyn Borysov =

Ukrainian composer

Valentyn Borysov Валентин Борисов
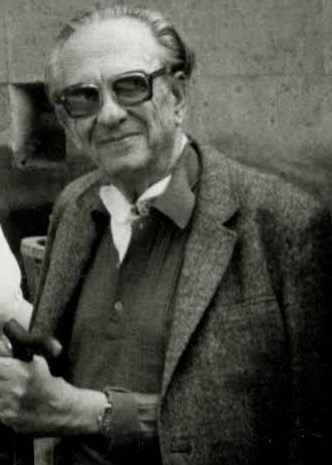

Background information
- Born: July 20, 1901; Bohodukhiv, Russian Empire (present-day Ukraine)
- Died: 1988 (aged 86–87) New York City, New York, U.S.
- Genre: Classical
- Occupation: Composer

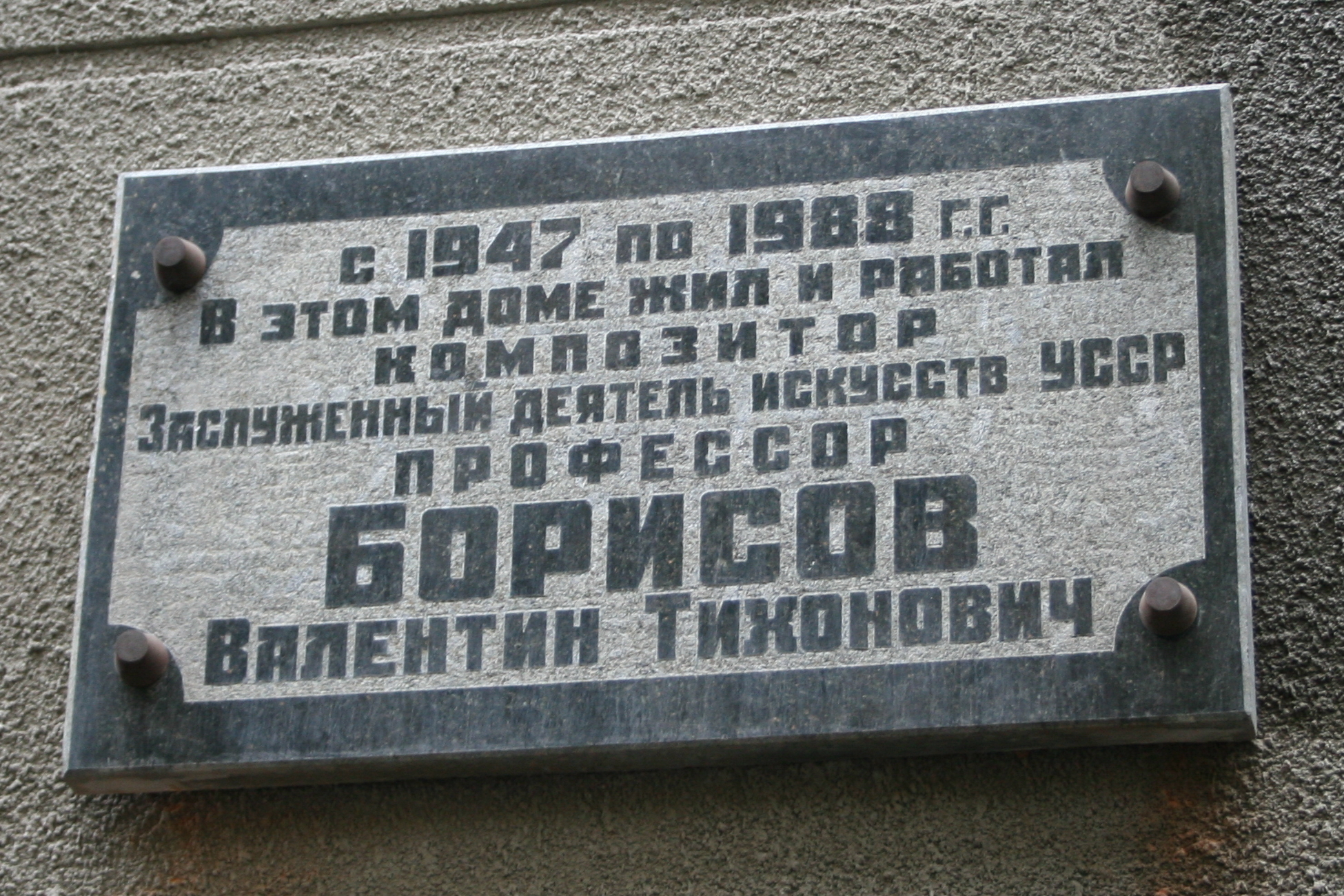
Plaque in Kharkiv

Valentyn Tykhonovych Borysov (Note: Ukrainian: Валентин Тихонович Борисов, romanized: Valentyn Tykhonovych Borysov) (Ukrainian: Валентин Тихонович Борисов, 20 July 1901 – 1988) was a Ukrainian composer. Borysov was born in Bohodukhiv and, in 1927, graduated from the Kharkiv National Kotlyarevsky University of Arts.
