= Valentyn Bilotserkovskiy =

Ukrainian violinist

Valentyn Mykhailovych Bilotserkovskiy (Ukrainian: Валентин Михайлович Білоцерківський; born October 14, 1948) is a Ukrainian violinist.

== Early life ==
Mykhailovych was born and lives in Kharkiv, Ukraine. He was born to a family of violinists and took up the family business. At age five Valentin took up the violin.

Belotserkovsky graduated from the Kharkov ten-grades standard musical school, before enrolling in Kharkov Institute of Arts (now the Kharkiv National Kotlyarevsky University of Arts) under professor A. Leshchinsky. He then undertook military service in the Kiev military district. As a part of a quartet and as the soloist of an orchestra, he toured Ukraine. In February, 1973 as a part of a quartet of the Kiev military district he won the National competition of N. V. Lysenko in Kiev. After his discharge from the army, he became a graduate student of the Gnessin State Musical College from 1972 to 1974.

== Teacher ==
From 1973 to 2000 Belotserkovsky taught at Kharkiv National Kotlyarevsky University of Arts, and after 1993 at H.S. Skovoroda Kharkiv National Pedagogical University. He teaches violin and violin ensembles, and lectures on the history of performance and teaching methodology. While at H.S. Skovoroda Kharkiv National Pedagogical University he prepared seven winners of the international competition "Fortissimo".

Bilotserkovskiy authored a study manual reflecting his series of lectures on the history of string performance and his teaching methodology (1972), a monograph "Psychological background of ensemble performance", articles on problems of ensemble performance in special musical journals, articles and sketches on the history of string performance in Kharkiv.

He teaches in Children's music school No. 13. He lectures and has practical classes on violin and chamber ensemble, guides the school violinists’ ensemble and orchestra, and offers performances, concerts and tours. For many years, the school collaborated with the Gymnasium for blind children. He took active part in teaching children with vision problems. His program on teaching piano tuning was approved by the Ministry of Culture in Kyiv. He has offered this course for many years.

== Violin ensemble "Vdokhnoveniye" ==
From 1998 to 2013, Bilotserkovskiy worked in Kharkiv University of Humanities 'People's Ukrainian Academy', where he was a creator and permanent leader of the "Vdokhnoveniye" People's performance violinists' ensemble. The ensemble is a laureate, award winner and winner of musical festivals and contests. It won national contests such as 'Students' Spring' and 'Barvy Oseni', International music contests such as 'Landysh', 'Fortissimo', 'The Flower of Hope' Festival of children's and youth's art in Turkey and the Festival of Ukrainian and Polish music.

In 2010, the ensemble won a Grand-prix and a Special prize of S-tet TV-Channel at 'Zvezdnye Mechty' Kharkiv first television festival of children's and youth art. The ensemble gave two-part concerts both in the Phylarmonic Hall and in the House of Organ and Chamber Music in Kharkiv. Leading instrumentalists and vocalists performed with the ensemble. Most arrangements were created specially for "Vdokhnoveniye" by Bilotserkovskiy.

In 2004, the ensemble was given the 'Exemplary' title and released its first CD. In 2008 Bilotserkovskiy was awarded a badge of honour 'For developing education in Ukraine' and with a personalized watch of Mayor of the city of Kharkiv. In 2009 the Ensemble was awarded a 'People's performance ensemble' title. In 2013 the Ensemble celebrated its fifteenth anniversary.
