= Ferenc Bernáth =

Classical guitarist and composer

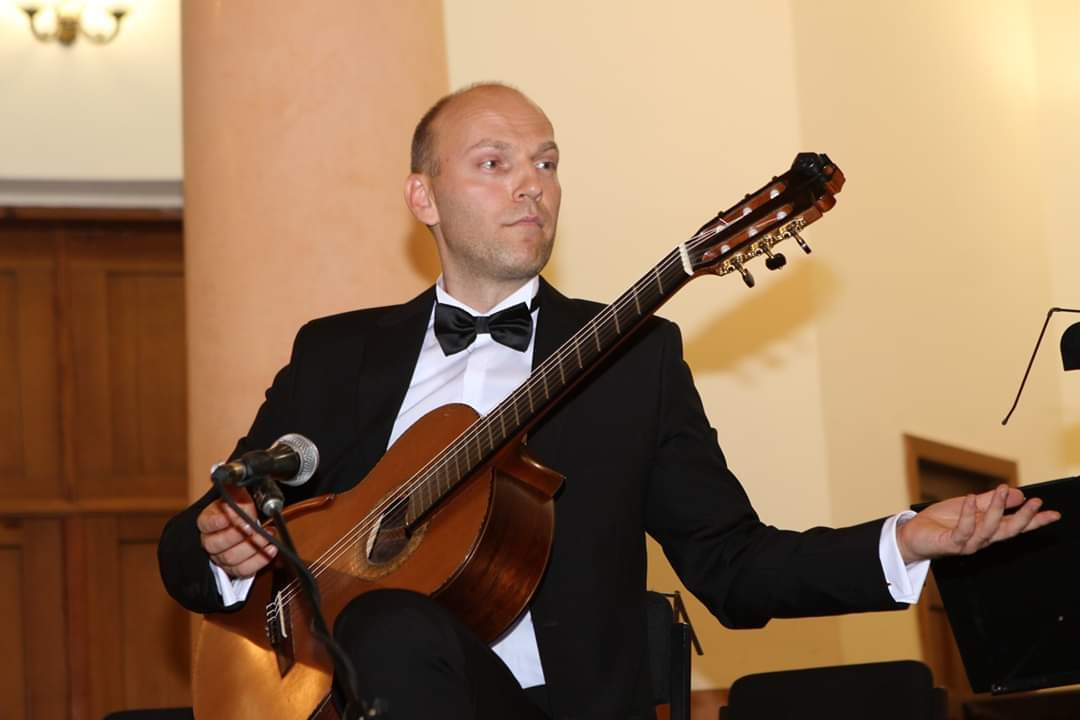
Ferenc Bernath guitarist in concert

Ferenc Bernáth (born 1981) is a Hungarian classical guitarist and composer.

== Life ==
In 2007, he acquired a guitar artist and teacher's degree with distinction at Kharkiv National Kotlyarevsky University of Arts. At the same university, he completed his dissertation in the field of Musical Art and was awarded a PhD degree.

Since 2007, he has been living in Budapest, Hungary. He began teaching at the Budapest Egressy Béni Music College of Art in 2007 and has served as the head of the department since 2012. He has been the guitar teacher of the Vienna Konservatorium Budapest since 2012.

He launched a concert series called "Gitárestek a Rátkaiban," providing a platform for several young guitarists to showcase their talent at the Rátkai Márton Art Club in Budapest. Additionally, he is the founder and artistic director of the "Velencei Gitáros Napok" (Guitar Days of Velence) International Guitar Festival. At this festival, he conducts masterclasses, performs concerts, and offers young guitarists the chance to participate in their own performances.

Bernáth gives a number of charity concerts every year to support various organizations, hospitals, orphans, and more. In 2014–2015, and from 2022 he held a series of concerts to support Ukraine. For his charitable activities, on October 17, 2020, the Universal Peace Federation honored him with the title of Ambassador for Peace.

== Awards ==
- Guinness Record (International Guitar Festival Balatonfüred, 2007, 2008)Bernáth Ferenc, a Guinness-rekorder gitárművész
- Awarded Pro Cultura Minoritatum Hungariae (Budapest, 2012)
- Member of the Ukrainian National Music Association of Guitarists (2017)
- First prize at the CompoGuitar International Composers Competition (Kiev, Ukraine, 2018)

== Publications ==
He has released 12 publications, including sheet music, CDs, and DVDs.

- Feelings and Moods – Solo CD. Záhony, 2005.
- Lyrical Melodies – Flute and Guitar CD. Budapest, 2009
- Magic of the Guitar – Live Concert DVD. Budapest, 2011
- Double Paraphrase – guitar duo CD. Miskolc, 2012
- Children Play – Characterpieces for classical guitar. Score+CD. Budapest, 2012
- The Magic Carpathians – guitar duo CD. Budapest, 2017
- Landscape Preludes – Score for guitar solo. Budapest, 2019
- The Girl with Blue Roses – Score for flute and guitar. Budapest, 2019
- Guitar Paintings – Score for guitar solo. Budapest, 2020
