= Volodymyr Lukashev =

Ukrainian theatrical figure

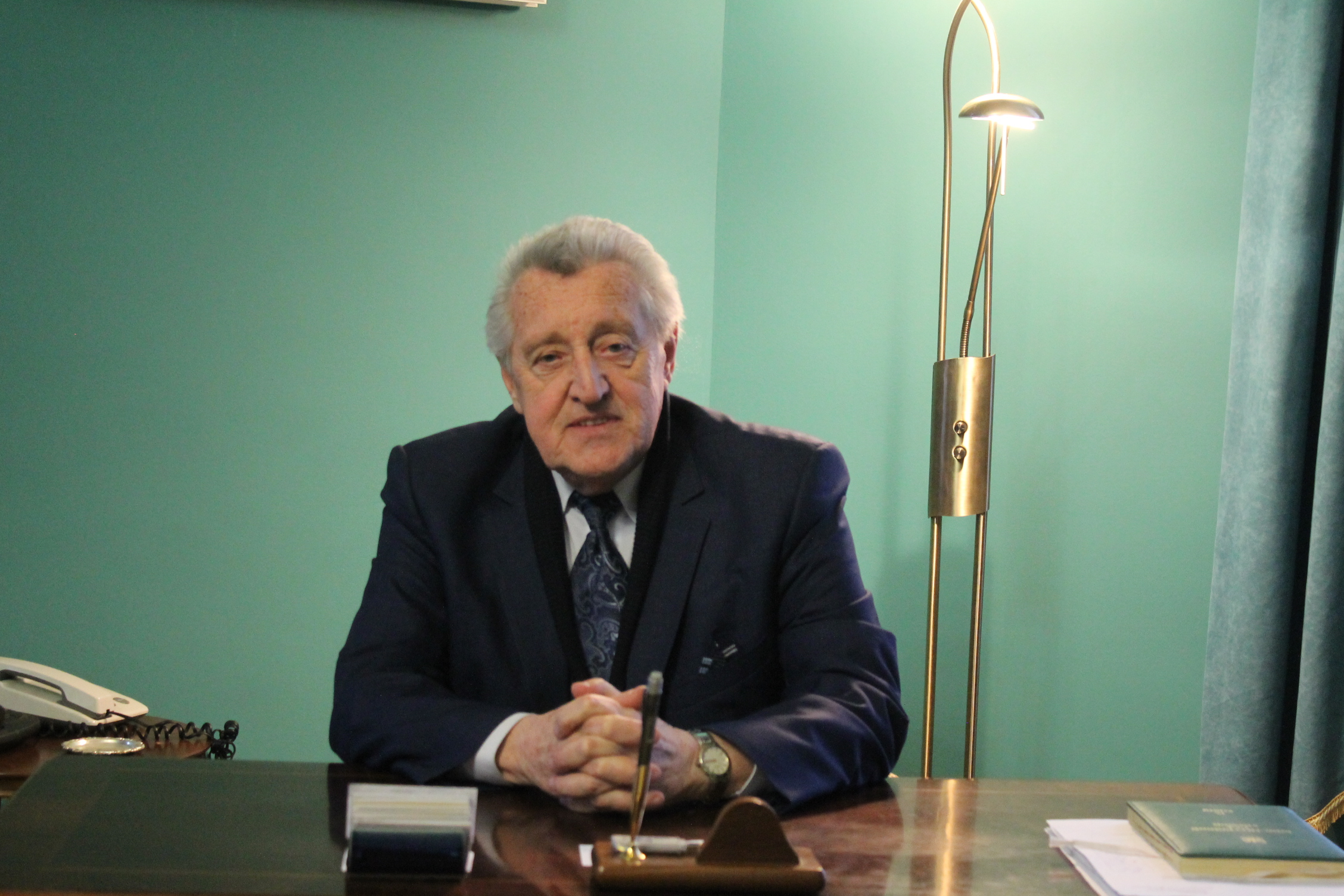
Volodymyr Lukashev

Volodymyr Lukashev (born May 7, 1936) is a Ukrainian opera director, theatrical figure, and teacher. He has won the People's Artist of Ukraine award as well as other international awards.

From 1973 to 1988, Lukashev was the director of the Kharkiv opera. Between 1963 and 1989 he was a professor at Kharkiv National Kotlyarevsky University of Arts.

Since 1996 Lukashev has been the director of the National Philharmonic of Ukraine. Since 1999 he has been a professor at Kiev Conservatory.
