= Yuri Shcherbinin =

Soviet and Ukrainian scholar (1941–2019)

- Юрий Щербинин
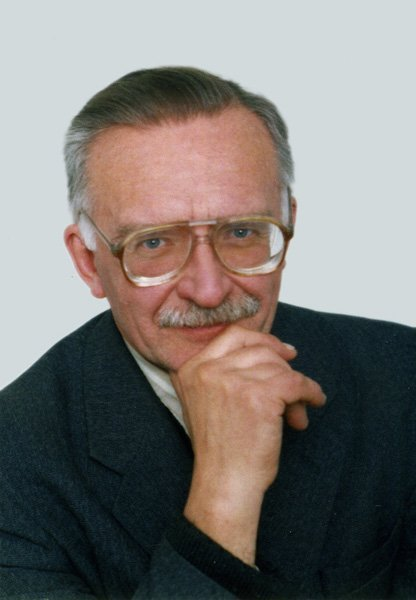
- Shcherbinin in 2010
- Born: May 30, 1941; Kharkov, Kharkov Oblast, Ukrainian SSR, Soviet Union
- Died: November 17, 2019 (aged 78); Kharkiv, Kharkiv Oblast, Ukraine
- Other name: Yury Sctherbinin
- Education: Kharkov Music College; Leningrad Conservatory; Kharkov Conservatory
- Occupations: Musicologist; curator; photographer
- Organizations: National Union of Composers of Ukraine (Executive Secretary of the Kharkiv Branch, 1973–1978, 1984–1997); Kharkov Music College (Director, 1978–1984); Ivan Kozhedub National Air Force University (Faculty, 1997–2000, 2003–2019)

Yuri Leonidovich Shcherbinin (Russian: Ю́рий Леони́дович Щерби́нин, romanized: Yúriy Leonídovich Shcherbínin; Ukrainian: Юрій Леонідович Щербінін, romanized: Yury Leonydovich Shcherbynyn), also known as Yury Sctherbinin (Note: According to Shcherbinin's Wikimedia Commons user page.) (May 30, 1941 – November 17, 2019), was a Soviet and Ukrainian musicologist, curator, educator, and photographer. In 2014, he founded the Treasures of Musical Kharkiv Museum; it was renamed in Shcherbinin's honor in 2020. He was also an active Wikipedian and Wikimedian.

== Biography ==
The Shcherbinin family had been involved in culture and politics since the 18th century. An ancestor, Mikhail Andreyevich Shcherbinin, was a friend of Alexander Pushkin and had been the dedicatee of one of his poems. Another ancestor, Yevdokim Shcherbinin, was a governor-general of Sloboda Ukraine. By the mid-19th century, the Shcherbinin family's prominence and wealth declined, whereupon they settled in Alexandrovsk. Shcherbinin himself disdained taking pride in the achievements of one's family, telling friends that "what matters most is what you are, not who your ancestors were."

Yuri Shcherbinin was born in 1941 in Kharkov, Ukrainian SSR. His father was a factory worker; his mother was a pianist who had studied with Semyon Bogatyrev. During the Great Patriotic War, she remained in Kharkov during the German occupation, a decision which led to her arrest after the war. She was imprisoned in the Gulag, but returned to Kharkov after serving her sentence.

Shcherbinin was a precocious child talented at painting, drawing, and carpentry. After hearing Pyotr Ilyich Tchaikovsky's "Lullaby", Op. 16, no. 1, he dedicated himself to music. He was first taught piano by his mother. He later enrolled in the piano academy of the Kharkov Music College, graduating in 1964. From 1965 to 1970, he was a student at the Leningrad Conservatory, where Pavel Serebryakov accepted him as a student after being impressed with his audition. Shcherbinin continued his studies at the Kharkov Conservatory. During his studies in Leningrad, he met Dmitri Shostakovich, Mstislav Rostropovich, and Georges Simenon; the latter gifted him a cigar as a memento.

In 1970, Shcherbinin graduated from the Kharkov Conservatory. He joined the Union of Ukrainian Composers in 1973 and remained a member for the rest of his life. There he and his wife established close friendships with Rodion Shchedrin and Maya Plisetskaya.

From 1978 to 1984 he was the director of the Kharkov Musical Vocational College named after B. M. Lyatoshynsky (formerly Kharkov Music College). From 1997 to 2000, then again from 2003 until his death, Shcherbinin was part of the faculty of the Department of Philosophy at the Ivan Kozhedub National Air Force University, where he also served as lecturer, curator, and photographer.

Shcherbinin died on November 17, 2019, in Kharkiv.

== Career ==
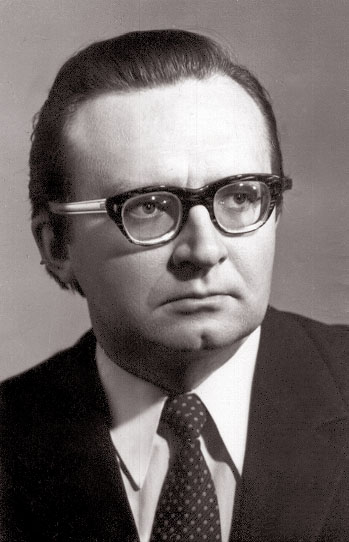
Shcherbinin circa early 1970s

=== Musicologist ===
Shcherbinin joined the Union of Ukrainian Composers (renamed the National Union of Composers of Ukraine after independence) in 1973. He was executive secretary of the Kharkiv branch 1973–1978, then again 1984–1997, and also served on the national board of the Union. As a musicologist, he promoted contemporary Ukrainian classical music and revival of interest in the culture of Sloboda Ukraine throughout his career. Starting in the 1960s, he produced radio and television programs, as well as authored over 200 publications on music.

=== Photography ===
Shcherbinin was also a professional photographer and in the course of his career photographed musicians such as Shostakovich, Sviatoslav Richter, Ivan Kozlovsky, and Tikhon Khrennikov.

=== Museum ===
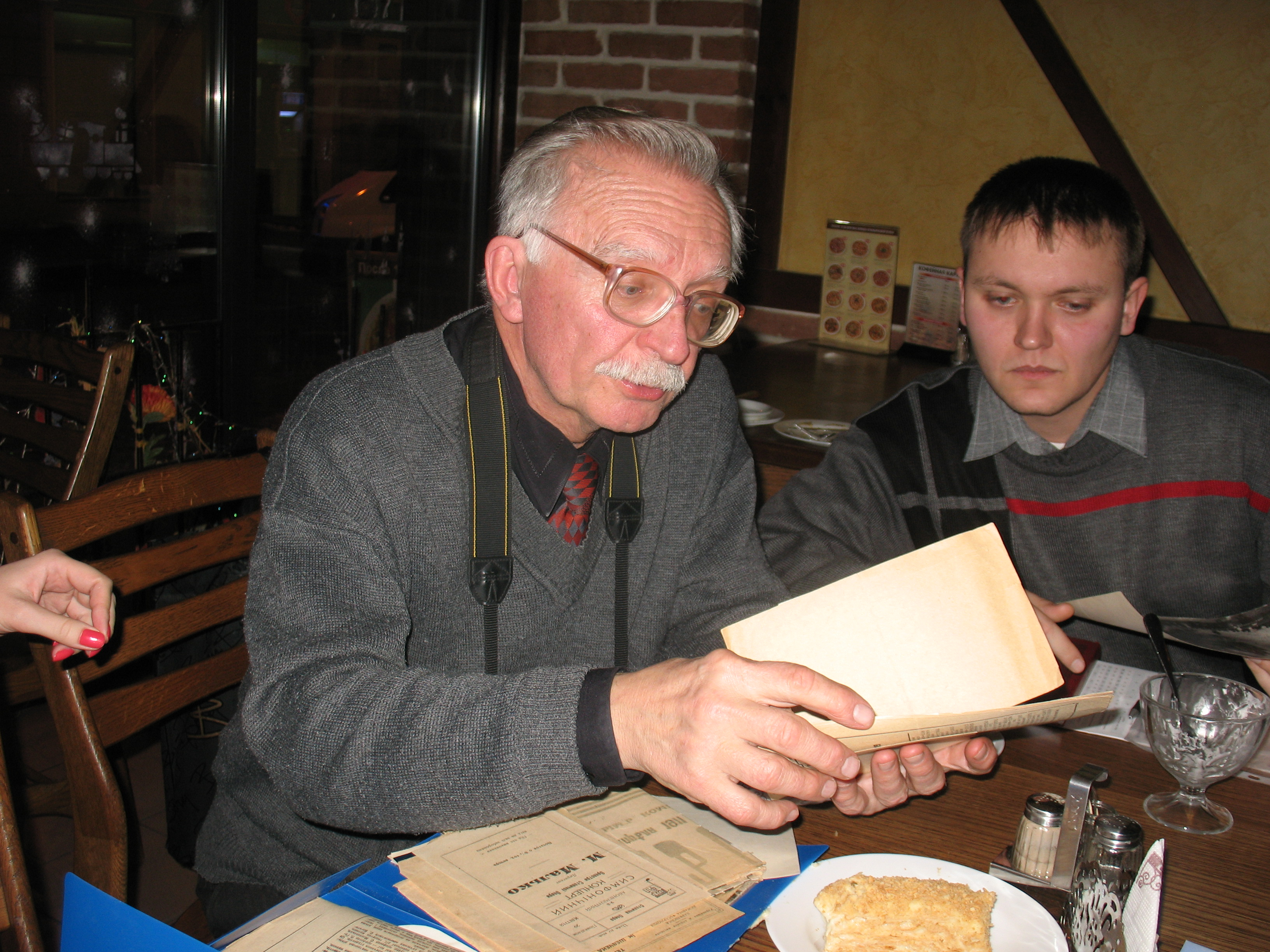
Shcherbinin at a Wikimeetup in Kharkiv; December 10, 2013. On the table below his right hand is a program for a concert conducted by Nicolai Malko

On August 30, 2014, Shcherbinin, with the help of the city of Kharkiv, founded the Treasures of Musical Kharkiv Museum at the House of Culture of Ivan Kozhedub National Air Force University. The creation of the museum was a personal ambition that he and his friends had worked on for decades. In 2013, Shcherbinin and a friend, Mikhail Krasikov, petitioned the mayor of Kharkiv to erect a museum dedicated to the region's musical history. Local journalists heard about their efforts; one of them broadcast a report about it on local television, which was seen by the rector of Ivan Kozhedub National Air Force University. He later approached Shcherbinin expressing surprise about the extent of his personal collection and told him that the university would be willing to host his museum.

The museum's collection consists of memorabilia and art works from Shcherbinin's personal collection, including some of his own creation. Some of the items in the museum's collection include a piano that had been played by Tchaikovsky, a baton used by Ilya Slatin, some personal belongings of Yakiv Stepovy, and a pair of ballet slippers owned by Svetlana Kolyvanova. In 1967, Shcherbinin had been gifted a number of Slatin's belongings, including his baton, by Konstantin Doroshenko, one of the conductor's students. The museum also has an exhibit dedicated to the first female conductor in Ukraine, Alisa Vidulina. Many items were also donated to the museum by the families of prominent Ukrainian musicians.

The items on display at the museum account for approximately one-sixth of its total holdings. One of the university staff joked to Shcherbinin that even Kharkiv's Palace of Sports would not be big enough to hold his entire collection. Included in the collection is his archive of over 10,000 photographs, of which he had only been able to digitize a small portion.

Shcherbinin personally led guided tours through the museum and lectured to visitors about its exhibits. In 2020, the museum was renamed in his honor.
