= Valentine Yanovna Zhubinskaya =

Ukrainian composer, concertmistress, lecturer and pianist

Valentine Yanovna Zhubinskaya (17 May 1926 – 2013) was born in Kharkiv, Ukraine. She was a Ukrainian composer, concertmistress, lecturer, and pianist. Zhubinskaya was the concertmistress at Kharkiv State Theatre until 1948, while studying piano under M. Pilstrom and composition under V. Barabashov at the Kharkiv Conservatory. She graduated with distinction from the Kharkiv Conservatory in 1949 and did postgraduate studies in Moscow, becoming a lecturer on the piano at Gnessin State Musical College in 1961.

== Compositions ==
Her compositions include:

=== Chamber ===
- Romance and Serenade (violin and piano; 1946)

=== Orchestra ===
- Piano Concerto (1950)

=== Piano ===
- Children's Album (12 pieces; 1946)
- Collection of Children's Pieces (1960)
- Eight Pieces (1960)
- Fifteen Pieces (1969)
- Four Etudes (1946)
- Lullaby and Humoresque (1946)
- Romance
- Russian Variations (1963)
- Sonata (1948)
- Song and Waltz (1946)
- Three Improvisations (1963)
- Waltz (1948)

=== Vocal ===
- Children's Songs (1971)
- Cycle of Works by Bulgarian Poets (1962)
- Dobruy Khleb Cycle (chorus; 1972)
- Molodezhnaya (Malykhin; voice and piano; 1968)
- Pesnya o Taimyre (M. Arons; voice and piano; 1947)
- Razvernis Garmonika (A. Prokofiev; voice and piano; 1947)
- Two Ukrainian Folk Songs (a capella chorus; 1948)
- Vremena Goda Cycle for Children (voice and piano; 1959)
