= Olga Lezhneva =

Ukrainian actress

- Ольга Лежньова
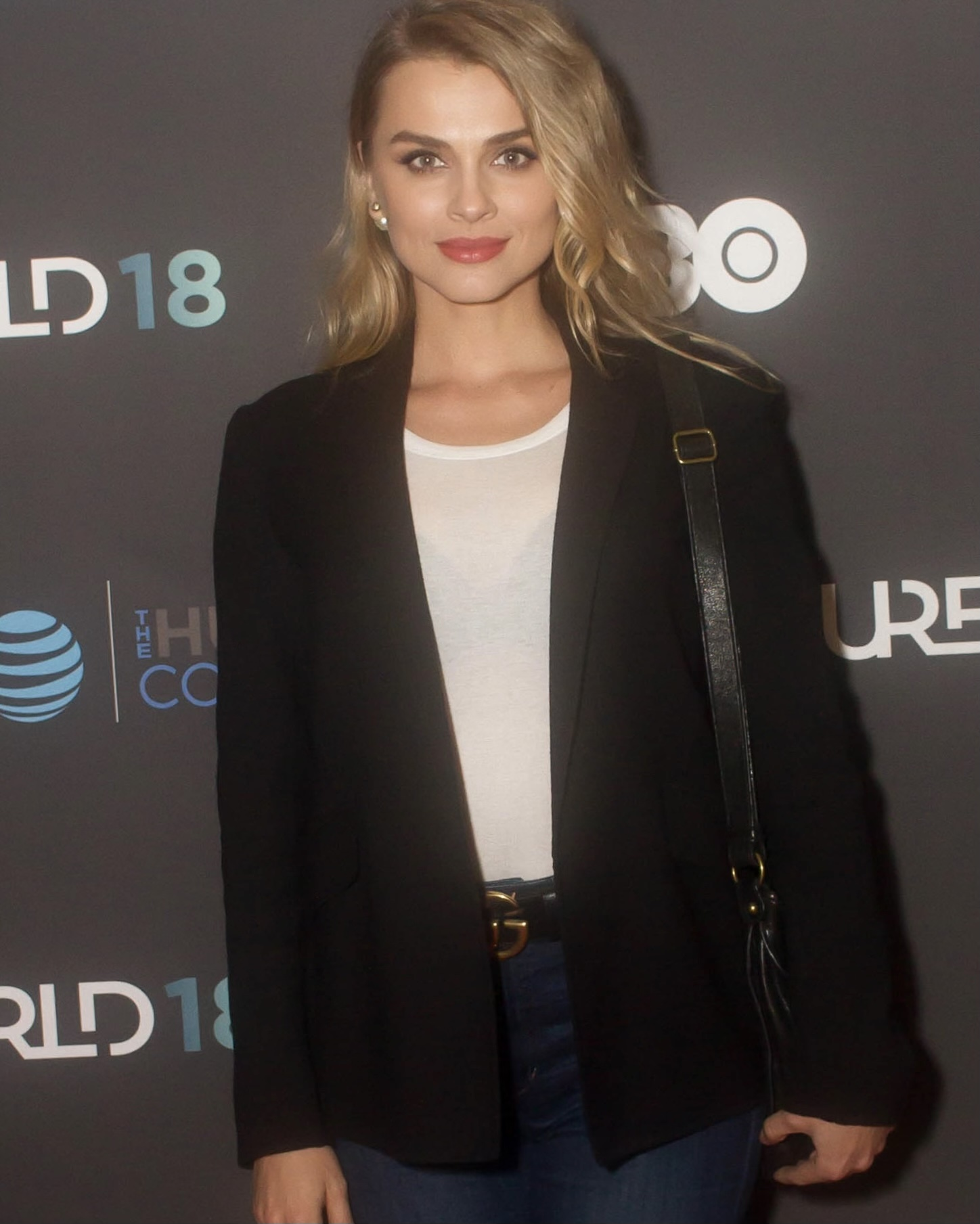
- Born: Olga Mykolaivna Levit; 6 May 1983 (age 43); Kharkiv, Ukrainian SSR, Soviet Union (now Ukraine)
- Years active: 2000–present

Olga Mykolaivna Lezhneva (Note: Ukrainian: Ольга Миколаївна Лежньова, romanized: Olha Mykolaivna Lezhnova) (born Olga Levit, (Note: Ukrainian: Olha Левіт, romanized: Olha Levit) May 6, 1983) is a film, and television actress.

== Biography ==
Olga Lezhneva is a Ukrainian actress who was born Olga Levit on May 6, 1983, in Kharkiv, Ukrainian SSR (now Ukraine), into a multicultural family. Her father, who graduated with a degree in chemistry, worked at the Scientific Research Technological Institute. Later, he transitioned into entrepreneurship and eventually became a producer at the broadcasting company “Nika-Video”. Her mother, of Ukrainian heritage, was the head of the Environmental Protection Department at a regional energy company. Olga excelled academically in school and was accepted into a prestigious gymnasium, where she received advanced studies in the sciences. But defying expectations that she would follow in her parents’ footsteps and pursue a STEM education, her path took an unexpected turn, leading her to study drama at the Kharkiv National Kotlyarevsky University of Arts instead. The family relocated to Kyiv in 2006. In 2014, Lezhneva-Levit moved to New York City, to expand her professional horizons in the entertainment industry.

=== Education ===
- 2000-2006 Kharkiv National Kotlyarevsky University of Arts. Theatre Faculty. Performing skills Department.
- 2007-2011 Kyiv International University. Institute of Linguistics and Psychology. Psychology Department.

=== Career ===
In 2000, at just 16 years old, Olga made her television debut as a talk show host on TV Channel "Tonis". She then starred in Ukrainian sketch comedy shows "The Office" (2005) and "Jokes on Target" (2006), both airing on TV Channel "Simon".

Olga's film career took off with supporting roles in the Ukrainian-Russian movies "Antisniper" (2007)" and "The Rules of Hijacking" (2008), followed by a starring role in the film "Like Hell!" (2008). Her subsequent appearances included a guest role in "The Taxi-2" and a memorable performance as a sultry conductor in the Ukrainian comedy "1+1 at Home" (2013).

She gained recognition for her notable roles, including Beatrice in the Ukrainian television sitcom "House Arrest" (2010), which she played for two seasons, and Ludochka in the Russian comedy "What Men Talk About" (2010). Later, she appeared on the TV show "The Affair" (2014) and in the film "Return to Montauk" (2016), marking her entry into US entertainment industry.

== Theatre ==
- 2006 — «The house of Bernarda Alba» by Federico García Lorca — Adela
- 2006 — «The Orchestra» by Jean Anouilh — Leon
- 2006 — «The Team» by Semyon Zlotnikov — Nadia Hollywood

== Filmography ==
| Year | Film | Role |
|---|---|---|
| 2004 | Police / УВД во власти | Thief |
| 2006 | Police Academy / Милицейская академия | Zhenya |
| 2006 | She Said "Yes" / Она сказала "Да" | Secretary |
| 2007 | Antisniper / Антиснайпер | Irisha |
| 2007 | Lesya + Roma / Леся + Рома | Friend of Lesya |
| 2007 | Days of Hope / Дни надежды | Girl in the Bar |
| 2007 | Former / Бывшая | Masha |
| 2007 | Hello to You / Здравствуйте вам | Vera |
| 2008 | Good Guys / Хорошие парни | Dancer |
| 2008 | Attractive Power / Сила притяжения | Veronica |
| 2008 | The Native People / Родные люди | Administrator |
| 2008 | Martha / Начать с начала,Марта | Victoria |
| 2008 | Like Hell! / Чёрта с два! | Tanya |
| 2008 | About Love / Про любовь | Masha |
| 2008 | Rules of Hijacking / Правила угона | Olga |
| 2010 | Only Love / Тільки кохання | Nelya |
| 2010 | Demons/Not Angels / Демоны не ангелы | Larisa |
| 2010 | What Men Talk About / О чём говорят мужчины | Ludochka |
| 2010 | I Will Say Nothing / Не скажу | Guest at the Party |
| 2010 | House Arrest / Домашній арешт | Beatris |
| 2011 | White Roses of Hope / Белые розы надежды | Lena |
| 2011 | Spring is in December / Весна в декабре | Mistress of Ziuzin |
| 2012 | The Waitlist / Лист ожидания | Zvetkova |
| 2012 | Woman's Doctor / Женский доктор | Natasha Ovcharenko |
| 2012 | The Taxi 2 / Такси-2 | Sasha |
| 2012 | Brother for a Brother 2 / Брат за брата-2 | Masha |
| 2014 | Brother for a Brother 3 / Брат за брата-3 | Veronika |
| 2014 | 1+1 at Home / 1+1 дома | Sexy Conductor |
| 2014 | Mykhtar / Мухтар | Juliet |
| 2014 | The Affair | Girl in the Pool |
| 2016 | Return to Montauk | Girl |
| 2018 | How To Do Everything | Tess |
