= Kharkiv National Kotlyarevsky University of Arts =

Ukrainian music and theatre university

Coordinates: 49.991139°N 36.232028°E

Kharkiv Conservatory
- Харківський національний університет мистецтв ім. І. П. Котляревського
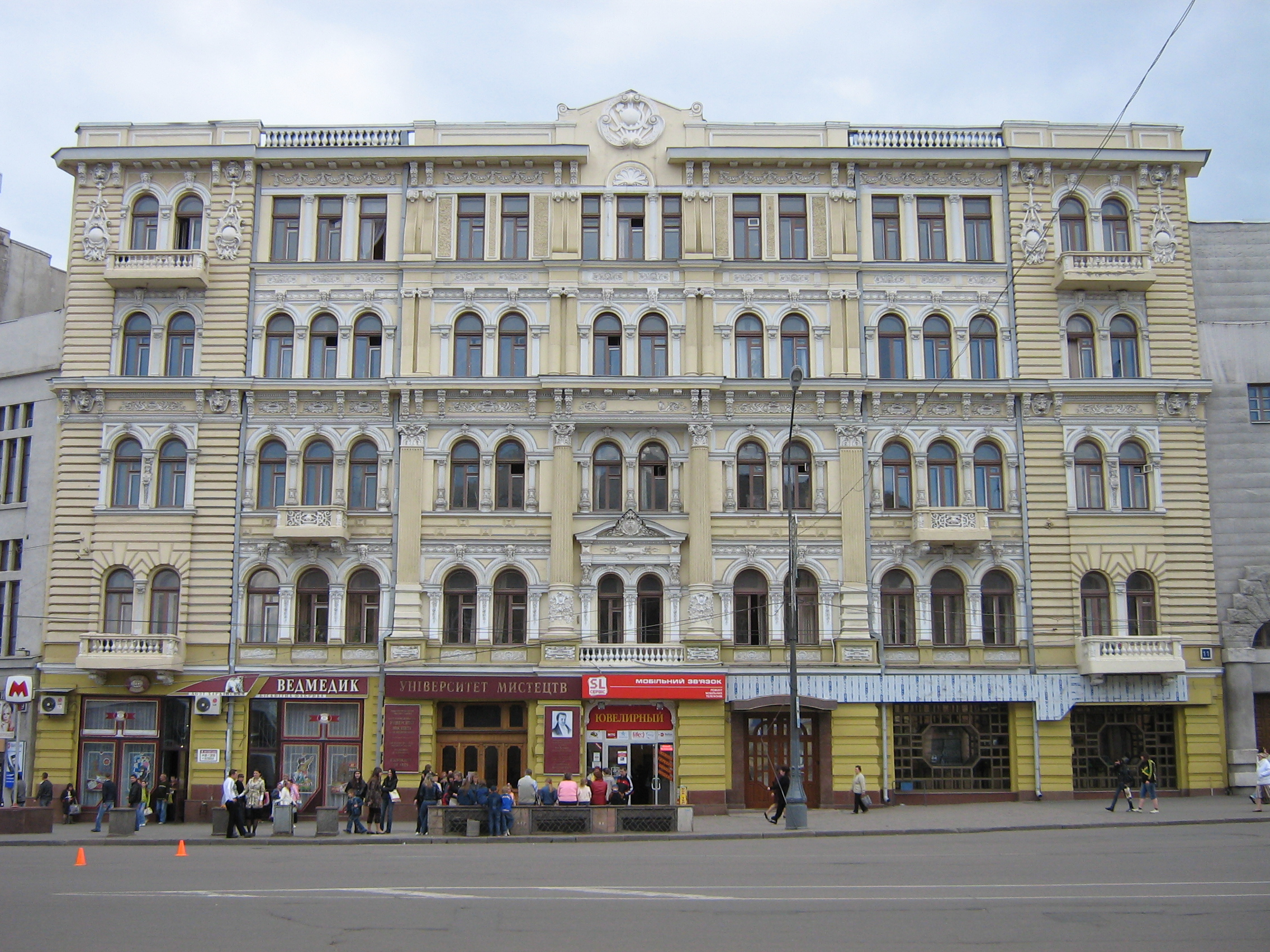
- Other names: Kharkiv State University of Arts 'I.P.Kotlyarevskyi'; Institute of Arts (1934-1963); Kharkiv State Conservatory (1917-1934)
- Type: University of music and theatre
- Established: 1917
- Accreditation: Ministry of Education and Science of Ukraine
- Location: Kharkiv, Ukraine
- Website: num.kharkiv.ua

Immovable Monument of Local Significance of Ukraine
- Official name: «Інститут мистецтв» (Institute of Arts)
- Type: Urban Planning, Architecture
- Reference no.: 7118-Ха

Immovable Monument of Local Significance of Ukraine
- Official name: «Будинок інституту мистецтв /б.біржа/» (Building of the Institute of Arts /former stock exchange/)
- Type: Urban Planning, Architecture
- Reference no.: 7120-Ха

The Kharkiv National University of Arts named after I. P. Kotlyarevsky (Note: or Kharkiv Conservatory, or Kharkiv National I. P. Kotlyarevsky University of Arts, Ukrainian: Харківський національний університет мистецтв ім. І.П.Котляревського, romanized: Kharkivskyi natsionalnyi universytet mystetstv imeni I.P. Kotliarevskoho) is the leading music and drama institution of higher education in Ukraine. The university trains about 900 undergraduates, graduates and postgraduates in music and theatre art. It enjoys Level IV accreditation, which is the highest under Ukraine's national standards, and is licensed to train foreign students.

== History ==
The roots of the university can be traced back to the musical classes opened in 1871 under the aegis of the Kharkiv branch of the Imperial Russian Music Society. Kharkiv Conservatory was established in 1917, a result of professional music education development in Kharkiv. Prominent among those who stood at the origins of the conservatory were Pyotr Tchaikovsky, Alexander Glazunov, and Ilya Slatin. The conservatory was several times renamed. Since 1920 it was known as Music Academy, but in 1923 with the opening of theatre major the academy was turned into the Institute of Music and Drama, and later into Kharkiv State Conservatory (1934) and Institute of Arts (1963). All these names reflect the search for the most optimal model of artistic education.

In 2004 the institute was awarded the university status and the highest Level IV accreditation. That was another step into the future; it confirmed integration into the European system of education and contributed to the strengthening of the university's international credibility. On the occasion of its 90th anniversary the university was awarded the Diploma of the Cabinet of Ministry of Ukraine and a gold medal of the Academy of Arts of Ukraine. In 2011 it was given the status of 'national importance'.

On June 1, 2013, the University hosted the first concert of the Children's Philharmonic dedicated to Children's Day.

== Directors and rectors ==
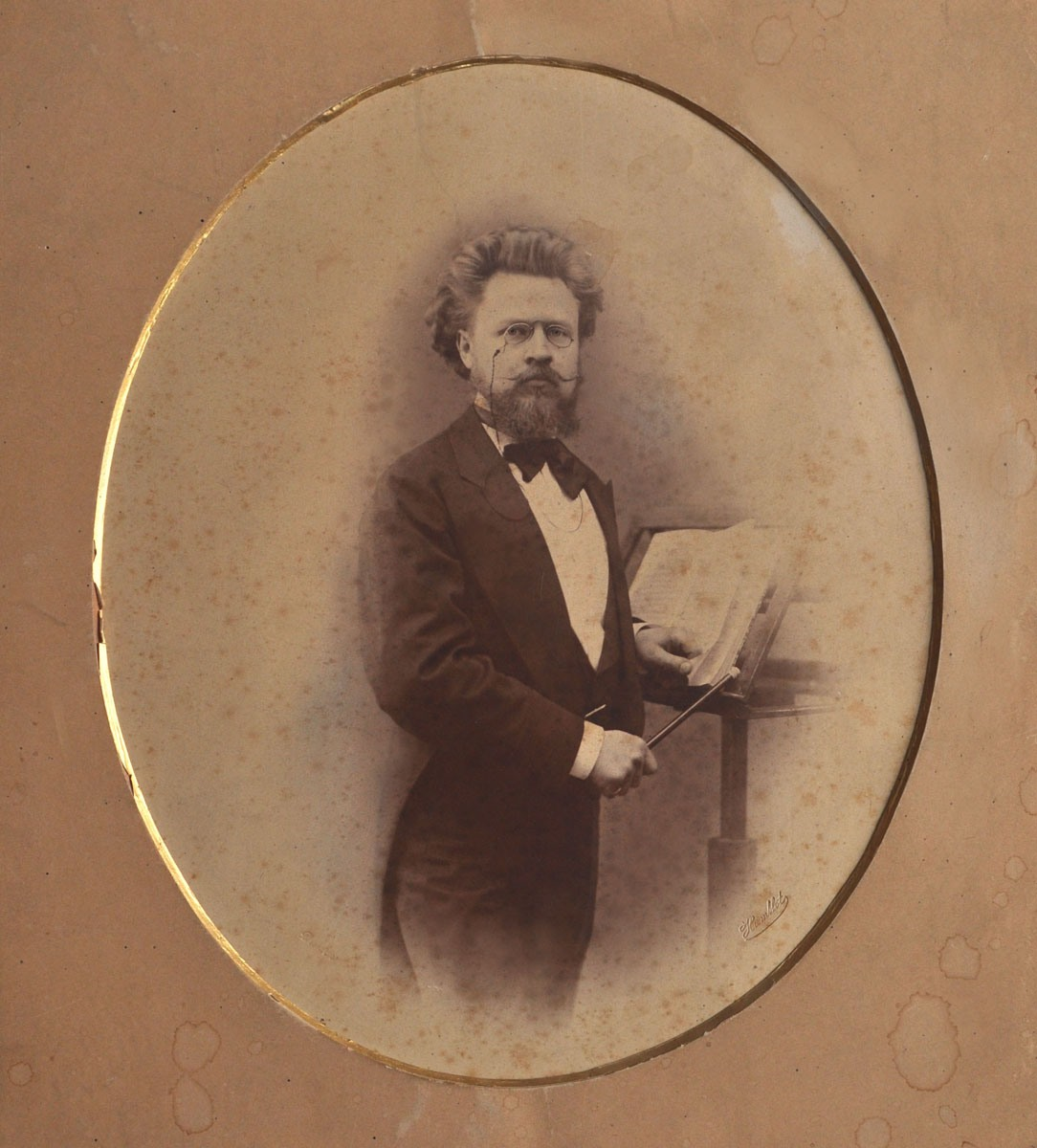
The first rector, Ilya Slatin (Photo from the collection of Yuri Shcherbinin)

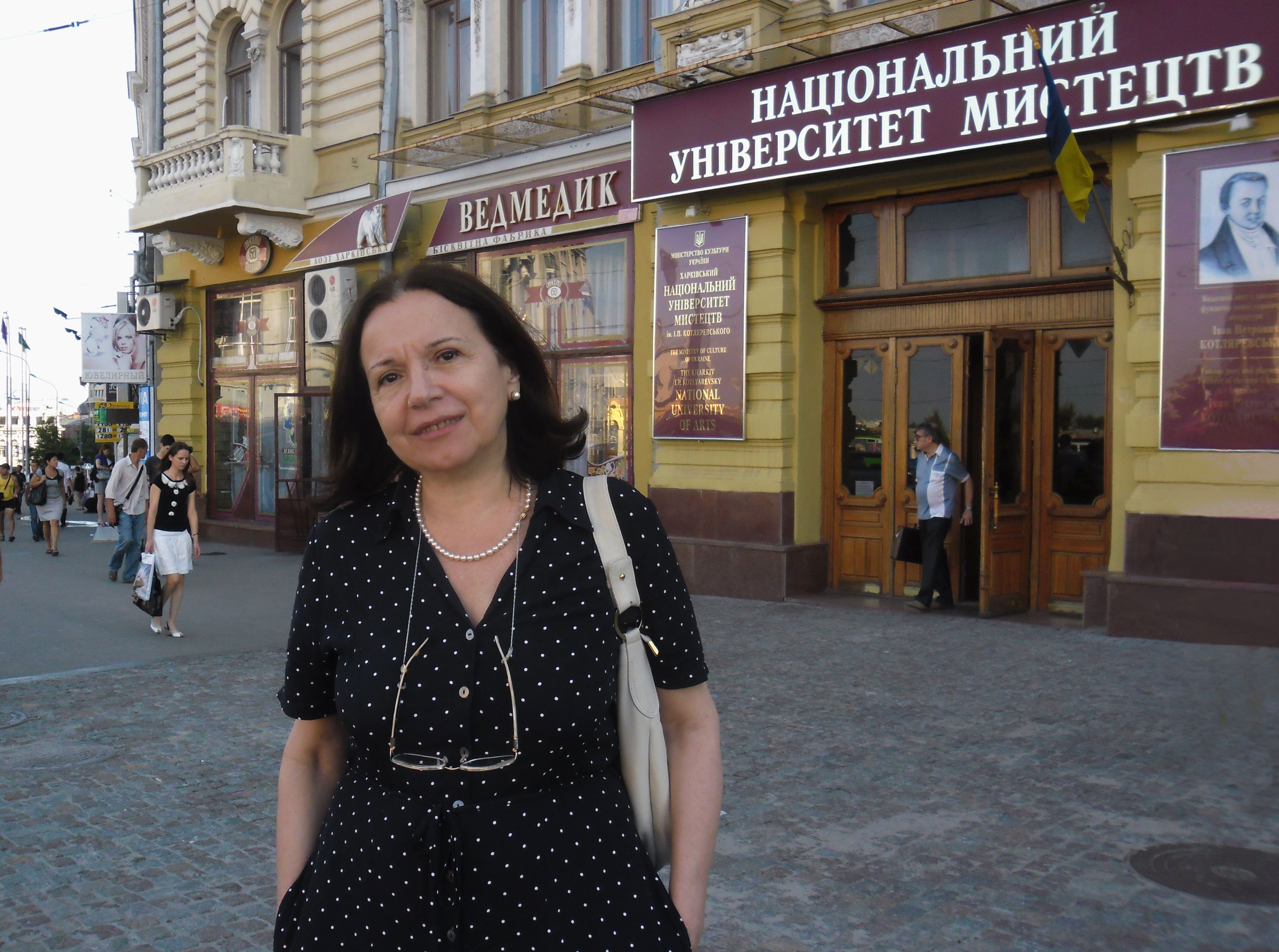
Ex-rector — Т. B. Verkina (photo by G. Hansburg)

- Slatin I.I. (1917–1920)
- Lutsenko P.K. (1920–1921)
- Roslavets N. А. (1921–1923)
- Polfiorov Ya. Ya. (1924–1925)
- Dremtsov S. P. (1927–1927)
- Grudyna D. А. (1927–1934)
- Dyakovska N. R. (1934–1941)
- Bogatyrev S. S. (May–October 1941)
- Komarenko V. А. (1941–1944)
- Borysov V. Т. (1944–1949)
- Kurochkin F. Ya. (1949–1951)
- Lebedinets А. D. (1951–1962)
- Nakhabin V. N. (1962–1967)
- Korniyenko V. S. (1967–1975)
- Averyanov G. B. (1975–1991)
- Ignatchenko G. I. (1991–2003)
- Verkina Т. B. (2004–2020)
- Govorukhina N. O. (2021-)

== Facilities ==
The university occupies two buildings: Conservatory and Theatre Department.

Conservatory, the main building, houses three halls (Big Hall, Chamber Hall and Small Hall), an opera studio, practice rooms, lecture rooms, a computer class and administrative offices. The building also has a library with about 240 000 depository items; a record and video library with more than 15000 records on CDs and DVDs, audio and video cassettes and vinyl records; an educational folklore laboratory created with the aim to collect, explore and preserve traditional music artefacts of Sloboda Ukraine (Slobozhanshchina).

Theatre Department is a smaller building which includes a big auditorium for drama performances, a small auditorium for puppet performances, rehearsal rooms, lecture rooms, dance rooms, a library, and a puppet's work-room.

== Courses and programs ==
Kharkiv National I. P. Kotlyarevsky University of Arts offers preparatory courses majoring in academic singing and theatre art as well as full-time and part-time courses for BA and MA degrees in Music Art and Theatre Art. The undergraduate degree programs take four years and the graduate degree programs – 1 year

Academic majors are piano, strings, brass, woodwinds, folk instruments, variety arts and jazz, composition, orchestral and choral conducting, organ, percussion, academic singing, musicology, theatre studies, drama and cinema acting, stage directing, acting and directing of the theatre of animation.

== Admissions ==
Admission into the university is by a live audition and interview (bachelor's degree). To get a master's degree foreign students must defend a qualification paper and take an exam in the Ukrainian (or Russian) language.

== Structure ==
=== Faculty of Musicology and Performance ===
The Faculty of Musicology and Performance has rich professional traditions followed by its leading specialists in the field of musicology, composition and performance.

Degree-granting departments:

- Special Piano
- Concertmaster's Skills
- Chamber Ensemble
- Theory of Music
- History of Ukrainian and Foreign Music
- Interpretology and Analysis of Music
- Composition and Orchestration
- Choral Conducting
- Solo Singing
- Opera Studies

=== Orchestra Faculty ===
The Orchestra Faculty established by a prominent musician and cultural professional I.І. Statin offers educational opportunities in performance studies to help students develop their creativity and to prepare them for careers in music.

Degree-granting departments:

- Chamber Ensemble and Quartet
- Orchestra String Instruments
- Orchestra Wind and Percussion Instruments and Opera and Symphony Conducting
- Folk instruments of Ukraine
- Instruments of Variety Orchestra

=== Theatre Faculty ===
Theatre education provided by Kharkiv National University of Arts has always been very prestigious. Its deep long-standing traditions took shape under the influence of L. Kurbas, I. Maryanenko, D. Antonovich, M. Krushelnytsky, V. Afanasyev, A. Pletnyov and A. Gorbenko and many other famous coryphaei of theatre art. Notable alumni of the faculty work all over the world including Kyiv, Moscow and St. Petersburg.

Degree-granting departments:

- Stage Directing
- Performing skills
- Performing skills and Stage Directing of the Theatre of Animation
- Theatre Studies.

== Postgraduate department ==
The Postgraduate Studies Office opened in 1993 in Kharkiv State I.P. Kotlyarevsky University of Arts provides training in speciality 17.00.03 – "Music Art" and postgraduate internship course in specialities 17.00.03 – "Music Art" and 17.00.02 – "Theater Art". In 2008 I.P. Kotlyarevsky University of Arts opened a Centre for Doctoral Training.

University postgraduate internship centre is a real school of performing and teaching skills. Some postgraduate internship trainees are engaged in research work. During the study they take PhD exams, participate in research conferences and after completing the postgraduate course program they get an additional year to get ready for the thesis defense.

Duration of study at the Postgraduate Studies Department is 4 years, post-graduate internship department – 2 years.

The university offers internship in higher education institutions of Poland.

== Performing ensembles and companies ==
Kharkiv University of Arts has a variety of student performance ensembles.

- Student Symphony Orchestra of Kharkiv National I. P. Kotlyarevsky University of Arts founded in 1921 performs works by West-European, Ukrainian and Russian composers. It is a regular participant of numerous national and international festivals.
- Folk Orchestra is an award winner of Hnat Khotkevych International competitions and the festival of Ministry of Culture and Arts of Ukraine. The repertoire includes pieces by West-European, Russian, Ukrainian classics and modern composers.
- Bandurist chorus was founded in 1996. It gives a great number of concerts in Philharmonic Societies and theaters all over Ukraine. The repertoire presents a two-part program of songs in Ukrainian, Belarusian and Russian, original arrangements of folk songs, vocal and orchestral pieces.
- Bayan orchestra started performing in 1993. The repertoire of the orchestra includes classical, folk, variety and jazz music as well as brilliant arrangements.
- Chamber orchestra was founded in 1967 by the Honored Worker of Arts of Ukraine, Professor Suren Kocharyan. This orchestra is the prize winner of the republican competition and Malta International Music Festival, "Kyiv Spring", "Young Voices" and "Golden Autumn" Festivals; it toured almost all around the USSR including Kyiv, Riga, Lviv and Moscow. The orchestra collaborated with the most notable soloists and composers. Today its repertoire, along with the pieces of Baroque and classical music, includes pieces of the greatest Ukrainian composers V. Borisov, I. Kovach, D. Klebanov, V. Bibik, V. Ptushkin.
- Student choir is a professional level choir consisting of graduates and advanced undergraduates. The repertoire includes masterpieces of national and world choral classics, sacred music, choral pearls of modern Ukrainian and foreign composers.
- Opera studio of Kharkiv National I. P. Kotlyarevsky University of Arts, which is more than 70 years old, is a youth opera house with an interesting repertoire and professional level performances that have become a part of national music and theater culture. The studio is always in search for experiments, and every year it produces a new show. The repertoire includes the best operas by Ukrainian, Russian and European composers.
- Educational theatre "The Fifth Floor" has more than a dozen of plays diverse both in the sense of dramaturgy (from national and international classics to the avant-garde of the 20th century) and in terms of performance style. Students of the theatre faculty produce performances staged not only by their professors, but also by the most successful students of stage directing departments.

== International partnership ==
Kharkiv University of Arts actively establishes partnerships with the main educational institutions all over the world. It actively participates in international collaboration with arts schools in Cincinnati (USA), Nuremberg, Leipzig (Germany), Naples (Italy), Geneva (Switzerland), Helsinki (Finland), Brussels (Belgium), Lublin (Poland), Vancouver (Canada), Moscow, St. Petersburg, Rostov-on-Don (Russia) as well as music colleges of Spain and drama schools of Poland, France, Russia, etc. Besides, the university maintains active partnerships with Goethe-Institute in Ukraine, French Cultural Center, Consulate General of Poland and Russia, Austrian and Swiss Embassies in Ukraine, British Council, and Rotary Clubs. It has formalized partnership agreements with universities of Russia, Belarus, Georgia, Lithuania, Poland and China. Concert tours, workshops and research symposia are arranged within these agreements. Such renowned musicians as Sergei Krivonos (USA), Krzysztof Penderecki, Grzegorz Syerochynsky (Poland), Timothy Reynish (Great Britain), Burkhard Rempe (Germany), and Volodymyr Lukashev (Ukraine) are honourable Doctors of Kharkov National I. P. Kotlyarevsky University of Arts.

== Professors ==
- Altukhov Valeriy — clarinettist
- Arkanova, Valentyna — soprano and professor
- Borysov, Valentyn — composer.

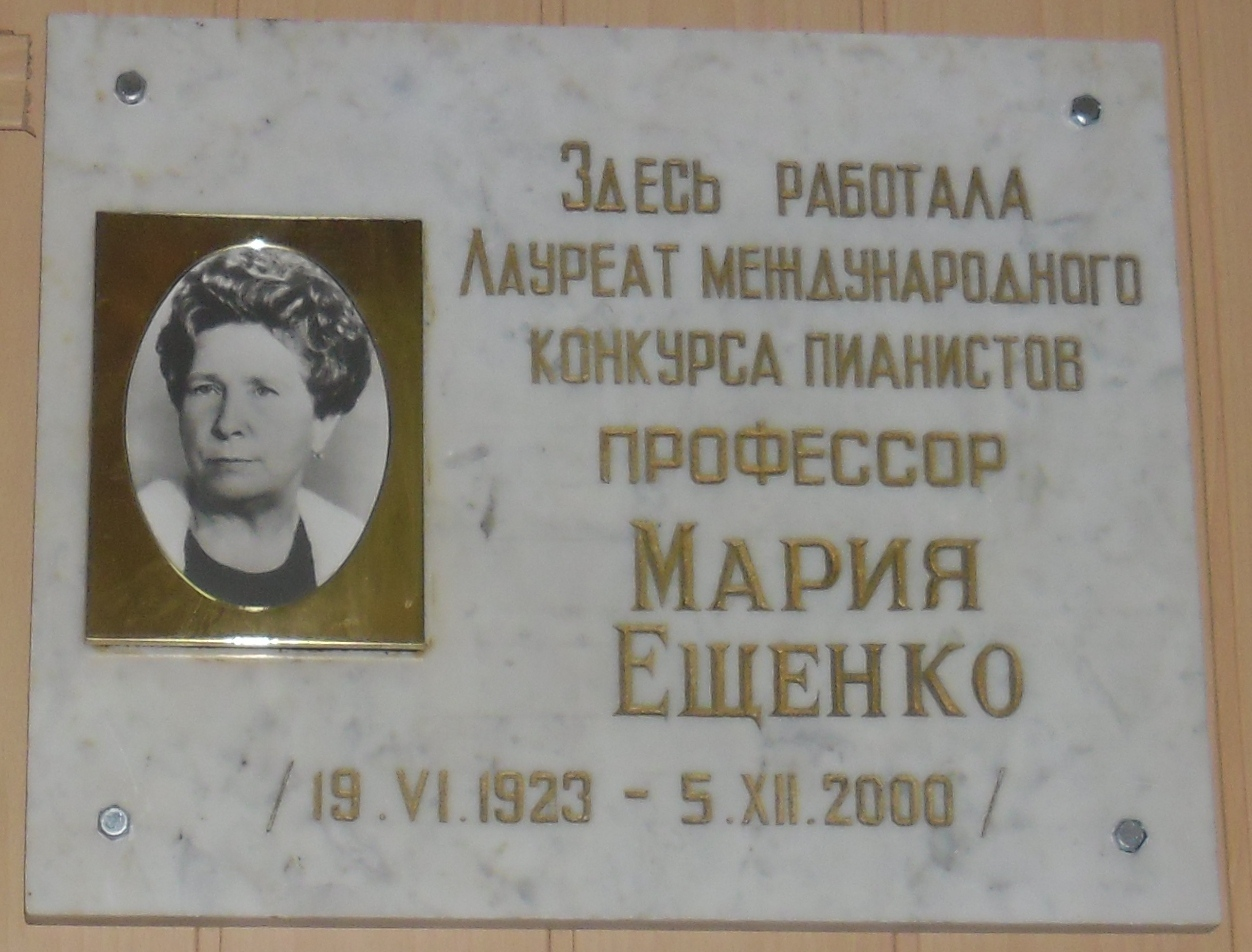
Memorial board to Mariya Yeshchenko

- Klebanov, Dmitri — composer
- Kravtsov, Taras — musicologist, composer.
- Maryanenko, Ivan — stage director, lecturer
- Tiumeneva, Galyna — musicologist.
- Korovay, Feodor — professor, folk instruments department
- Tyts, Mykhailo — musicologist, composer.
- Voinov, Arkadiy Vasyliovych – professor, Honoured Artist of Ukraine
- Zolotovytska, Irma — musicologist.
- Zolotukhin, Volodymyr — composer.

== Notable alumni ==
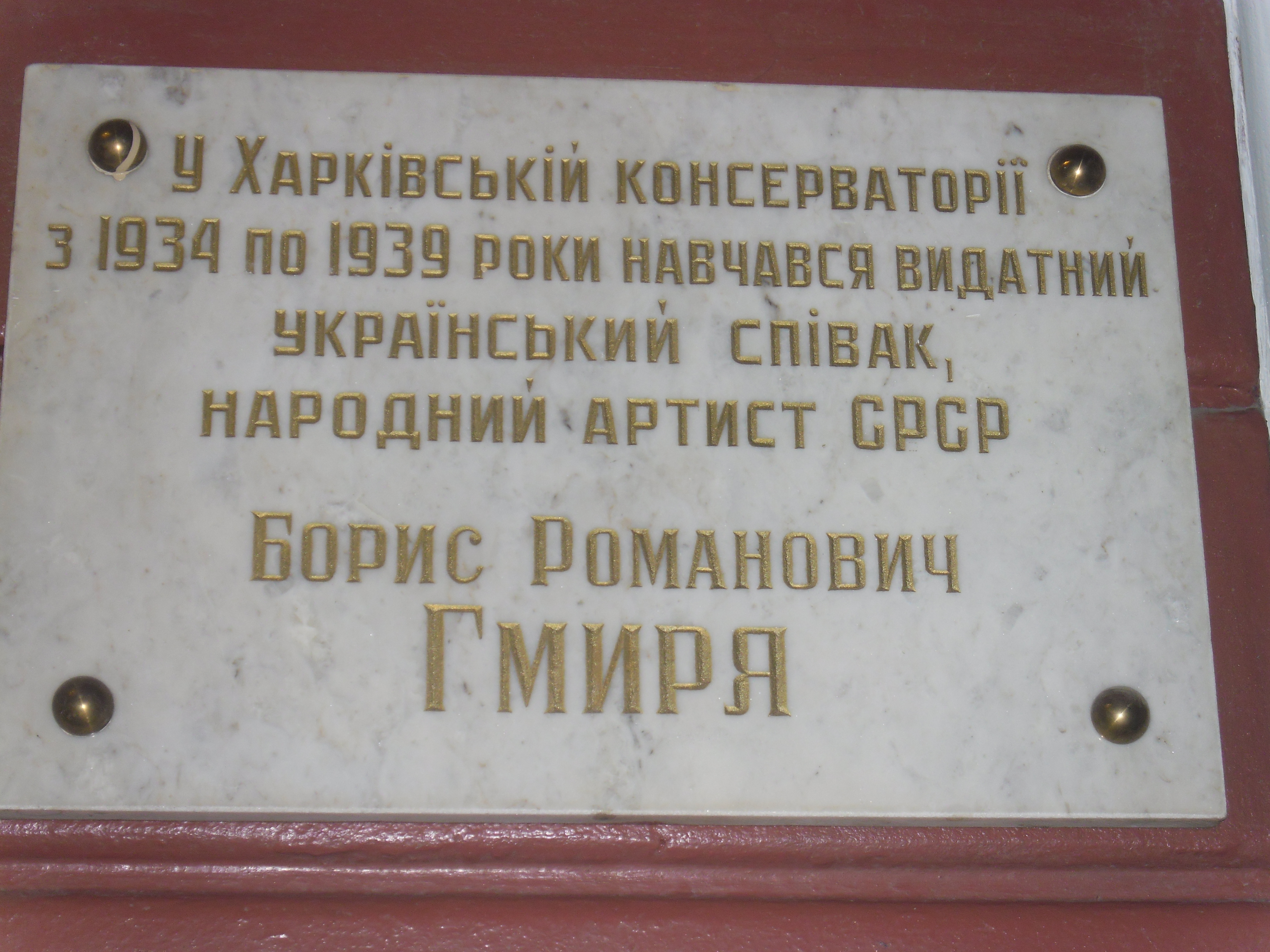
Memorial board to Gmyria

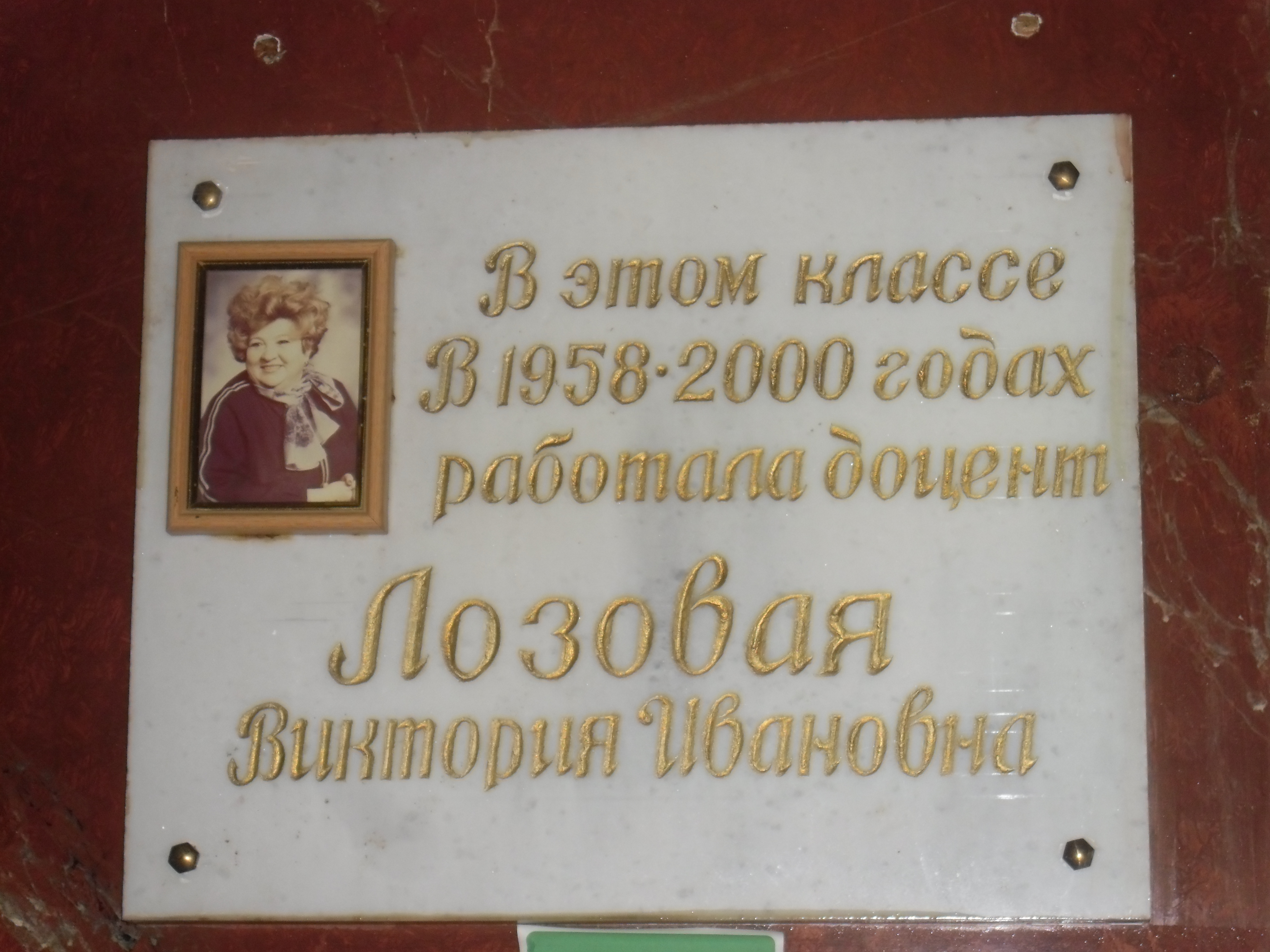
Memorial board to Viktoriya Lozovaya

- Arkanova, Valentyna — soprano and music professor
- Babich, Nataliya — choirmaster
- Babkin, Serhii — singer and actor
- Bernáth, Ferenc - guitarist, composer
- Bevz, Maryna — pianist
- Bibik Valentyn — composer
- Bilotserkovskiy, Valentyn — violinist
- Borysov, Valentyn — composer
- Bulgakov, Lev — composer
- Bykov, Leonid — actor
- Dmitriieva, Oksana – chief director of the Kharkiv Puppet Theater
- Dubinin, Andriy — singer
- Dunayevsky, Isaak — composer.
- Fateyeva Natalia — actress
- Finarovsky, Gryhoriy — composer
- Gmyrya, Boris — singer
- Gusarova, Olga — musicologist.
- Hansburg, Gryhoriy — musicologist
- Hanzburg, Isroel — trombonist
- Hetmansky Oleh — actor
- Horbenko, Anatoliy — theatre critic
- Dursenieva, Oleksandra — opera singer, mezzo-soprano, soloist in Bolshoi Theatre
- Karmynsky, Mark — composer.
- Klebanov, Dmitri — composer
- Kolodub, Lev – composer.
- Koval, Mykola — singer (baritone)
- Kravtsov, Taras — musicologist, composer.
- Kramarenko Serhiy – Laureate of the VI Allunion contest of Variety art performers, Honoured Artist of Russia
- Kudriats, Yevhen — choirmaster, journalist
- Kyrychenko, Raisa — singer, Hero of Ukraine
- Leontyev, Pavlo — conductor
- Lezhneva, Olga — actress
- Manoilo, Mykola — singer
- Mashchenko, Mykola Pavlovych — actor
- Merkuryev, Petro — choirmaster
- Myroshnychenko, Viktor — stage director and actor. People's Artist of the Ukrainian SSR.
- Muzhchil, Viktor — composer.
- Palkin, Vyacheslav — choirmaster, composer
- Paster, Maksym — opera singer, tenor, soloist in Bolshoi Theatre
- Petrenko, Olexiy — actor
- Piliutikov, Serhiy — composer
- Ruslanova, Nina — actress
- Serfdiuk, Les — actor
- Sevastyanov, Boris - composer
- Shcherbynin, Yuriy — musicologist
- Shchetynsky, Oleksandr — composer
- Tsipola, Guesella Albertovna — opera singer
- Tyts, Mykhailo — musicologist, composer
- Tolba, Veniamin — conductor
- Tiumeneva, Galyna — musicologist
- Topchii, Marko — guitarist
- Yarovynsky, Borys — composer
- Urytskyi, Mykhailo — puppet theater director.
- Verkina, Tatiana — pianist
- Zhubinskaya, Valentine Yanovna – composer
- Zolotovytska, Irma — musicologist.
- Zolotukhin, Volodymyr — composer.

== See also ==
List of universities in Ukraine

== Sources ==
- Харьковский институт искусств имени И. П. Котляревского: 1917—1992. — Харьков, 1992. — 446 с.
- Харківський державний університет мистецтв імені І. П. Котляревського. Pro Domo Mea: Нариси / Ред. Т. Б. Вєркіна, Г. А. Абаджян, Г. Я. Ботунова. — Харків, 2007. — 336 с.
- Кучер Л. І. Оперна студія Харківського державного університету мистецтв ім. І. П. Котляревського: До 70-річчя від дня заснування / Ред. Г. Ганзбург. — Харків, 2009. — 68 с.
- Зоряний час Університету мистецтв: Нариси до 95-річчя утворення ХНУМ імені І. П. Котляревського / Ред.-упоряд. Г. І. Ганзбург. — Харків, 2012. — 400 c. ISBN 978-966-8591-96-9
- Ганзбург Г. I. Консерваторія в університетському статусі // Музика [Київ]. — 2014. — № 3.
- Харківський національний університет мистецтв імені І. П. Котляревського. 1917–2017. До 100‑річчя від дня заснування : мала енциклопедія / У 2 т. / Харків. нац. ун‑т мистецтв ім. І. П. Котляревського; ред.‑упоряд. Л. В. Русакова. — Харків : «Водний спектр Джі-Ем-Пі», 2017. Т. 1. : Музичне мистецтво. — 740 с. ISBN 978-617-7445-38-7
- Харківський національний університет мистецтв імені І. П. Котляревського. 1917–2017. До 100‑річчя від дня заснування : мала енциклопедія / У 2 т. / Харків. нац. ун‑т мистецтв ім. І. П. Котляревського; ред.‑упоряд. Л. В. Русакова. — Харків : «Водний спектр Джі-Ем-Пі», 2017. Т. 2. : Театральне мистецтво. — 424 с. ISBN 978-617-7445-39-4
