= Kurylenko =

Kurylenko or Kurilenko (Ukrainian: Куриленко) is a Ukrainian surname. Notable people with the surname include:

- Gennady Kurilenko (c. 1944–2013), Ukrainian speedway rider
- Olga Kurylenko (born 1979), Ukrainian-French actress
- Vasyl Kurylenko (1890–1921), Ukrainian military commander
