= Atlas Festival =

Annual musical festival in Kyiv, Ukraine

- Genre: Rock, indie, hip hop, EDM
- Dates: Last days of June till first days of July (currently)
- Locations: Expocenter of Ukraine; 1 Akademika Hlushkova Avenue; Kyiv, Ukraine, 04210
- Years active: 2015–present
- Founders: Dmytro Sydorenko
- Website: atlasfestival.com

The Atlas Festival is an annual music and arts festival held at the Expocenter of Ukraine in Kyiv, Ukraine.

It was founded as Atlas Weekend by Dmytro Sydorenko and is organized by PMK Event Agency and concert hall Atlas. In 2022, the festival was rebranded under its current name.

The event features many genres of music, including rock, indie, hip hop, and electronic dance music.

== History ==
=== 2015 ===
First Atlas Weekend was held at Art-factory Platforma. Total of 30 artists played at the festival and the event itself gathered more than 20,000 people.

Lineup: BoomBox, The Hardkiss, ONUKA, Jamala, Bahroma, O.Torvald, SunSay, The Maneken and other.

=== 2016 ===
In 2016 it was the first time Atlas Weekend was held at Expocenter of Ukraine. It gathered 130 artists on 6 stages.

Lineup: The Subways, Kwabs, Apocalyptica, Mashina Vremeni, GusGus, Splean, Jamala, BoomBox, 5'nizza, Monatik, ONUKA, Noize MC, Druha Rika, SunSay and other.

=== 2017 ===
2017 dates were June 28 - July 2.

Headliners: The Prodigy, Kasabian, John Newman, Three Days Grace, Röyksopp, Monatik, Verka Serduchka, Rudimental, Yellow Claw.

Other artists: Nothing but Thieves, The Hardkiss, BoomBox, Noize MC, O.Torvald, Royal Canoe, Therr Maitz, Dakh Daughters, ONUKA, Vivienne Mort, DETACH, Bondage Fairies, Stoned Jesus and other.

There were more than 250 artists in total on 8 stages during 5 days. More than 350,000 people visited the 2017 edition.

=== 2018 ===
2018 dates were July 3 - July 8.

Headliners: The Chemical Brothers, Placebo (band), Martin Garrix, LP (singer), Nothing But Thieves, Lost Frequencies, Tom Odell

The 2018 Atlas Weekend saw over 527,000 people attend.

=== 2019 ===
2019 dates were July 9- July 14.

Headliners: Liam Gallagher, The Black Eyed Peas, ASAP Rocky (was changed to ASAP Ferg)

The 2019 Atlas Weekend saw over 538,000 people attend.

=== 2021 ===
Due to restrictions related to the COVID-19 pandemic, the organizers decided to focus on inviting local artists.

Participants: Okean Elzy, DJ Snake, Fatboy Slim, The Hardkiss, Verka Serduchka, Valery Meladze, Tina Karol, Boombox, Antytila, Tommy Cash, Pornofilmy, Brainstorm, Onuka, Lyapis Trubetskoy, Alyona Alyona, 5'nizza, DakhaBrakha, Kazka, DaKooka.

More than 600 thousand people attended the festival.

=== 2026 ===
Atlas Festival is held at the Blockbuster Mall in Kyiv. The event spans three days and features both Ukrainian and international artists across genres including pop, rock, and hip-hop.

Atlas Festival 2026 Lineup
July 17	Monatik, Zhadan i Sobaky, Nikow, Latexfauna, Shuhar, OTOY, Phil It, Ivan Liulenov, KLER
July 18	Artem Pyvavarov, Kola, Odyn v kanoe, SadSvit, Zwyntar, Kheitspich, SKYLERЯ, Dity Inzheneriv
July 19	BoomBoks, Bez Obmezhen, Druha Rika, Kurhan & Agregat, BREATHE, MUR, DREVO, The Unsleeping, Nytso Potvorno

In 2026, Atlas Festival announced a large-scale fundraising campaign titled "150%" in support of the "Dronefall" project by the "Come Back Alive" foundation. The fundraising goal is 150 million hryvnias. The funds raised will be directed toward equipping military units engaged in intercepting and destroying enemy strike and reconnaissance unmanned aerial vehicles.

The campaign is accompanied by a promotional video produced in the style of classic mafia films centered on family clans. The plot follows members of the Atlas Family community — artists, volunteers, public figures, and business representatives — gathering for a symbolic meeting to discuss their shared responsibility for supporting Ukraine's defense. The central character of the video is Don Atlas, who proclaims the idea of unity among the community members. The video features singer Monatik, "Come Back Alive" foundation Director Taras Chmut, Kurgan & Agregat members Amil and Ramil Nasirov, Yevhen Volodchenko, Oleh Karpenko, as well as KLER, SKYLERR, and other representatives of the Atlas Family.
