= Breathe (Australian band) =

Australian band

Breathe. Team
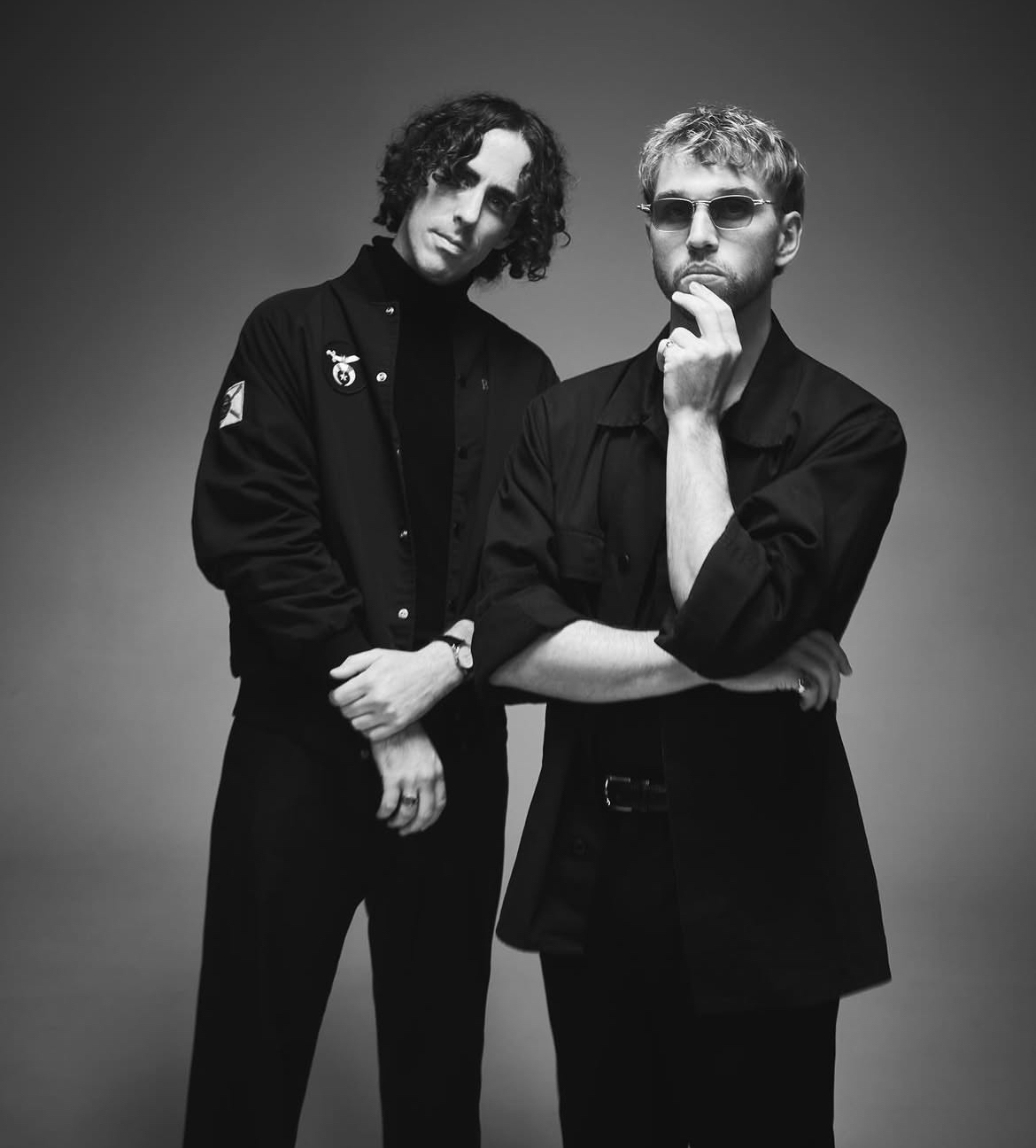

Background information
- Also known as: breathe. Team
- Origin: Sydney, New South Wales, Australia
- Genres: Soul; electronic; minimal; Trip Hop
- Labels: Independent; Silk
- Members: Sean Walker; Andrew Grant

breathe. (stylised as b.) are an independent soul duo blending immersive visuals with downtempo electronic music. Not to be confused with the 1980s English pop band Breathe, breathe. are known for their signature mix of late-night soul and alternative R&B. Based in Sydney, Australia, the duo is made up of Andrew Grant and Sean Walker.

== History ==
breathe. formed in Sydney, Australia. Founded by Andrew Grant and Sean Walker (a founding member of the band Movement).

breathe. released their debut single Are You All Good? in September 2018 via the label Silk. Accompanied by its music video, created with cinematographer Tim Nagle, the track quickly drew attention.

Their follow-up single London was premiered by Complex, earning praise from The Line of Best Fit who compared their music to "the beauty of a peaceful night."

By 2019, their third single, Haze cemented their growing profile. Directed by Dave May of Tall Story Films, critics and artists alike began to take notice. Their sound was labelled "late night soul" and "brilliantly minimalistic". Rufus du Sol described their music as a "sultry underworld that pulls you right in", while Ta-ku said the band's music hit him "right in my feelings."

As their audience expanded globally, comparisons to Moses Sumney and Michael Kiwanuka surfaced, with Hypebeast reviewing Haze as an "atmospheric" song that gives off a "ghostly yet lovesick vibe."

Seven years after their formation, breathe. released their debut album For Your Darkest Days. A collection of both new and old tracks, it reflects the evolution of the band and their signature late-night sound. The Polish Music Platform RKK describes the album like a journey that "leads listeners even deeper into the world of lonely nights, unspoken emotions, and chance encounters".

In July 2026, the breathe. together with collaborator Dylan Wright performed two shows in Ukraine, having been invited to perform at a music festival in Kyiv. Their first concert was at !FESTrepublic in Lviv on 19 July, before headlining the Atlas Festival in Kyiv two days later. The three spent the night before the concert in Kyiv in a bomb shelter due to attacks on the city. A photograph taken by Ukrainian photographer Tanya Horbatiuk during the band's performance at the Atlas Festival was subsequently selected as the cover artwork for breathe.'s second album.

== Features ==
breathe. have been featured across film, television and digital media.

- You (TV series), on Netflix
- Couples Therapy (2019 TV series) on the Showtime Network
- Elite (TV series). on Netflix
- A Tourism NSW Advertisement covering Nina Simone's 'Feeling Good'.
- Raising Dion on Netflix
- Grown-ish on Disney+
- Apples Never Fall on Peacock
- Bel-Air on Peacock
- Fall for Me on Netflix

== Members ==
- Sean Walker – percussion, guitar, production, mixing (2018–present)
- Andrew Grant – bass guitar, synthesizers, production, mixing (2018–present)

== Discography ==
- Are You All Good? (2018)
- London (2019)
- Haze (2019)
- Grace (2020)
- Home (2020)
- It's Not The End (2021)
- Cathedral (2022)
- All Figured Out (2023)
- One More Try (2023)
- Heat (2023)
- Journey (2024)
- Where You At These Days? (2024)
- I Did This (2024)
- Change Gonna Come (2024)
- My Night (2024)
- Yesterday (2025)
- Darkest Days (2025)
- River Running Wild (2025)
- Out To Sea (2025)
- The Storm (2025)
- Come Over (2025)
- There's a Way Out of Here (2026)
- Hurting (2026)
- You Saw Me (2026)
- There's a Way Out of Here (2026)

== See also ==
- Movement (band)
- Illangelo
- Minimal music
