= Tina Karol =

Ukrainian singer (born 1985)

- Тіна Кароль
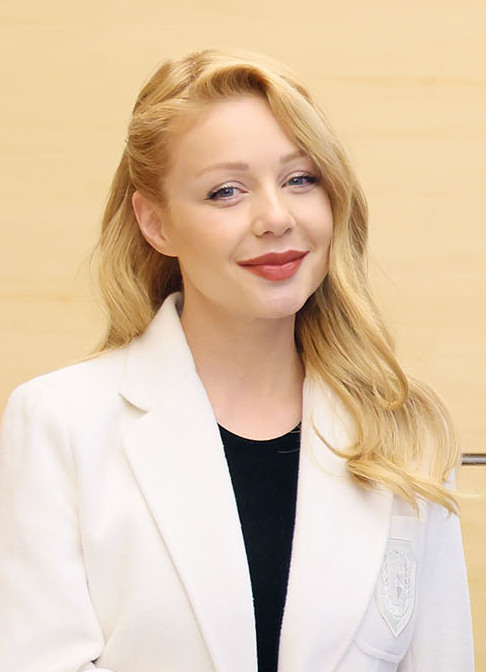
- Karol visiting Japan in 2022
- Born: Tetiana Hryhorivna Liberman; 25 January 1985 (age 41); Orotukan, Russian SFSR, Soviet Union (now Orotukan, Magadan Oblast, Russia)
- Education: R. Glier Kyiv Institute of Music; National Aviation University
- Occupation: Singer
- Years active: 2003–present
- Title: People's Artist of Ukraine (2017)
- Spouse: Yevhen Ohir (m. 2008; died 2013)
- Children: 1
- Awards: Order of Princess Olga, 3rd class; People's Artist of Ukraine; Merited Artist of Ukraine; Medal "For Work and Success"
- Musical career
- Origin: Kyiv, Ukraine
- Genres: Pop; Soul; R&B; Pop Rock; Dance Pop
- Labels: Lavina (2006–2007); Astra Records (2007–2013); Bentley Records (2019–2021); House of Culture (2021–present)
- Website: tinakarol.com/en

Signature
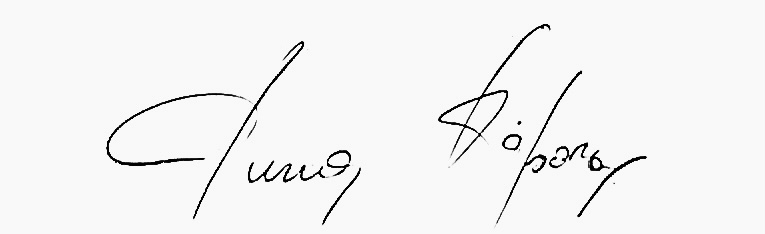

Tetiana Hryhorivna Liberman (Note: Ukrainian: Тетяна Григорівна Ліберман) (born 25 January 1985), better known by her stage name Tina Karol, (Note: Ukrainian: Тіна Кароль Russian: Тина Кароль) is a Ukrainian singer and founder of the Tina Karol charitable foundation.

Tina Karol won more than 25 Grand Prix and first prizes at various international music competitions and festivals. Her voice range is more than 4 octaves (from the F of the small octave to the Fis of the fifth octave).

Karol is the mentor on The Voice of Ukraine (2013, 2015–2021, returned again in 2026,) and also a star coach on The Voice. Kids (2012, 2015, 2016). She hosted the TV shows “Hochu buty Zirkoyu” ("I Want to be a Star") and “Tantsi z Zirkamy” on 1+1 (TV channel) (2005–2007, 2017–2019). In 2020, she was a judge at Vidbir, Ukraine's national selection for the Eurovision Song Contest.

In 2013, Tina Karol became “The most popular Woman in Ukraine” according to Google and Yandex ratings. She is a three times title holder "Singer of the Year" on the YUNA Music Award (2014, 2015, 2018) and three times title holder "Singer of the Year" on the M1 Music Awards (2015, 2017, 2018). Tina Karol also is three times the title holder of “The most beautiful Woman of Ukraine” ("VIVA!" magazine “The most beautiful people” award; 2008, 2009, 2017). In 2021 Tina Karol entered the Ukrainian national rating “Top 100 most influential women in Ukraine” according to the magazine "Focus".

On June 1, 2014, on Children's Day, Tina Karol founded the Tina Karol charitable foundation. It is a charity initiative of the singer, which aims to help children's oncology departments of city and regional hospitals in all cities of Ukraine. As a public figure and philanthropist Tina Karol also cooperates with the United Nations Population Fund on various social programs. She conducted two peacekeeping missions in the hot spots of the planet – Iraq and Kosovo (2005). Tina Karol toured almost all of Ukraine with the Great Tour of Schools as part of her social program. She developed the social project “Znaty ta chuty!” ("Know and Hear!"), which she presented at the UNFPA Forum in Istanbul in April 2007.

In the autumn of 2017, Karol became the first Ukrainian artist who performed seven concerts in a row at the Palace "Ukraine" – the main concert venue of the country. The seventh show was charitable. Children and doctors, who are helped by the Tina Karol Foundation, were invited to it.

In the summer of 2018, Tina Karol set an absolute record in the history of Ukrainian pop music – she gave 77 concerts during her nationwide tour “Intonations”. Throughout her career, Tina has recorded nine studio albums, three mini-albums, six live albums, seven soundtracks, forty singles, one audiobook, and three hits collections. The May 2023, videography of the Ukrainian singer Tina Karol includes forty-eight music videos, nine documentaries, four mood videos, and one lyric video.

== Biography ==
Tina Karol was born on 25 January 1985 to a Ukrainian mother and a Ukrainian Jewish father in Orotukan, Magadan Oblast, Russian Far East. Karol moved to Ivano-Frankivsk, Ukraine, at the age of six. Her father, Hryhoriy Liberman, was from Vashkivtsi, Ukraine. Karol confessed in 2006 she often felt discriminated against in school because of her Jewish last name. She is fluent in both Ukrainian and Russian. As a teenager Karol (under her real name Tetiana Liberman) performed for four years with the dancing ensemble at the Kyiv branch of the Jewish Agency, and her repertoire included songs in Hebrew and in Yiddish. In 2000, she traveled with this ensemble to the United States, where the group's appearances raised money for Jewish Agency for Israel programs in Ukraine.

In her fourth year, she was awarded a scholarship by Ukraine's parliament. Karol has participated in numerous youth, regional, international, and Jewish singing contests as well as musicals and theatrical shows. Karol became the soloist of the Ensemble of Song and Dance of the Ukrainian Armed Forces as well as a television personality. In 2005, she took a less Jewish stage name after producers of New Wave had suggested that to her. In 2006, she commented on this: "It was a part of my agreement with the producers, but, to be honest, I am glad I changed my name. I felt like it hindered me in my life."

In 2005, Tina Karol gave a performance at the live televised broadcast of the Teletriumph Awards, which was partially responsible for her consideration in the 2006 Eurovision Song Contest. She returned to perform once again at the Teletriumph 2006, and was also awarded the Teletriumph for her work on the talent show I Want to Be a Star, which aired on ICTV.

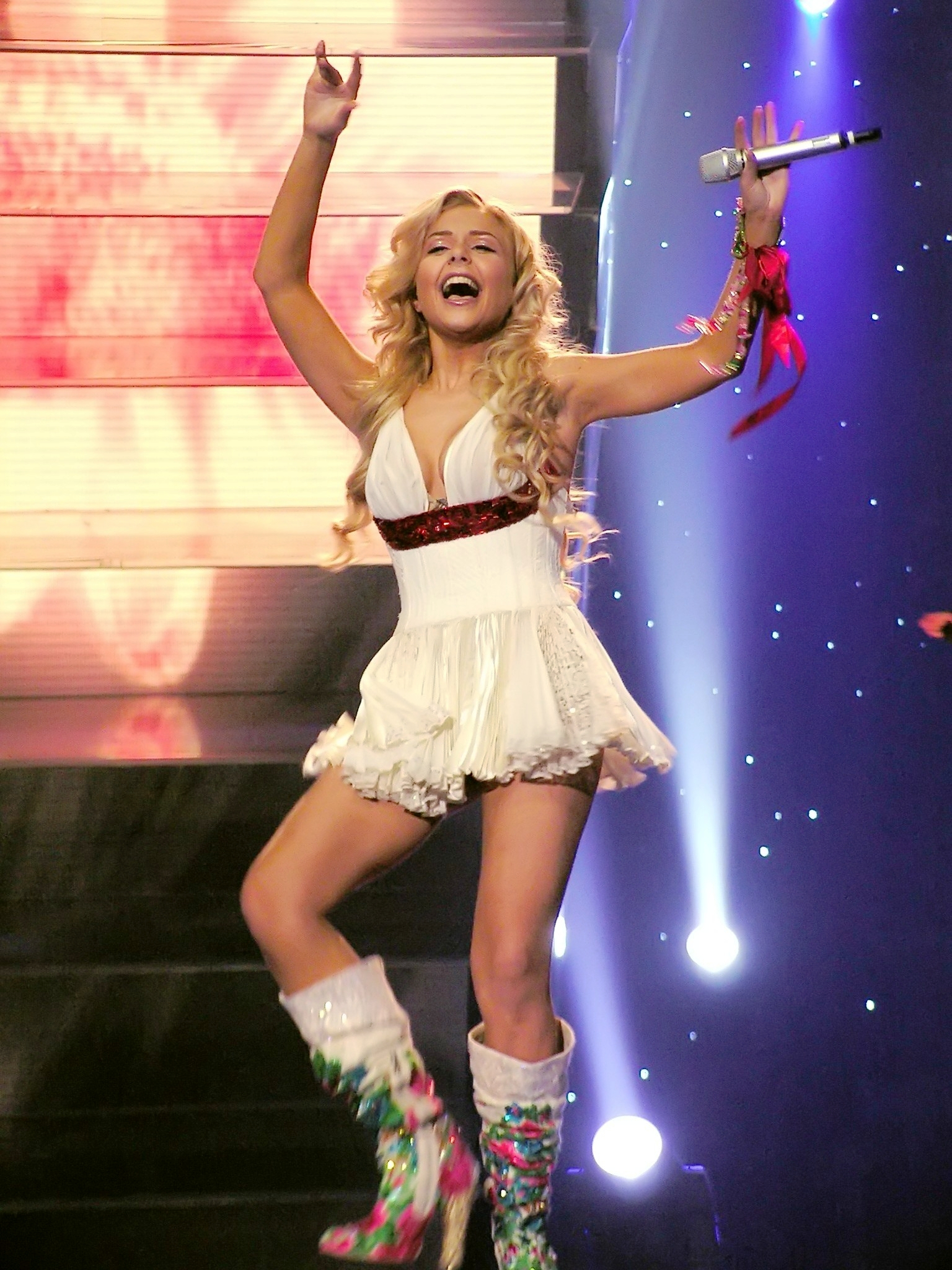
Karol performing at the Eurovision Song Contest, 2006

In 2006, Karol won at the casting for the Eurovision Song Contest 2006 with the song "I Am Your Queen" and therefore represented Ukraine at the event finishing 7th, scoring 145 points, with a revised version of the song entitled "Show Me Your Love". In 2006, Tina Karol released her debut album Show Me Your Love, and another album entitled Nochenka, with some of the songs of the first album in Russian and Ukrainian. Also in 2006, she started studying by correspondence at the National Aviation University in Kyiv. In 2006, she also participated in the United Nations Unite for Children, Unite Against AIDS campaign against HIV/AIDS in Ukraine.

In 2007, she released her new album Polyus prityazheniya and wrote a fairy tale "Pautinka", a story about a caterpillar, portraying the show business as Tina has experienced it. Philipp Kirkorov, Alla Pugacheva, and Verka Serduchka all have "parts" in the story.

On 16 January 2009, President of Ukraine Viktor Yushchenko awarded Karol the title of Honored Artist of Ukraine. In October 2009, she was ranked 92nd in a Top 100 Most Successful Women in Ukraine compiled by experts for the Ukrainian magazine Focus.

In February 2009, she received the Most Beautiful Singer of Ukraine of 2008 award from the organizers of the beauty contest Miss Ukraine Universe-2009. In February 2009, for the second time, she received the title The Most Beautiful Woman of Ukraine according to the readers of the glossy edition Viva! The premiere of a new song "Ne boysya, malchik" was also held there. In March 2009, two songs – "U neba poprosim" from the album Polyus prityazheniya and a new composition "Lyubol" – became soundtracks for two television series.

In the spring of 2011, together with Sergey Lazarev and the duo Alibi, she became the host of the music TV show Maidans.

In the fall of 2012, she served as a contestant coach on the Ukrainian reality talent show The Voice Kids, and in the spring of 2013, she went on the 3rd season of The Voice of Ukraine as a coach.

On November 24, 2013, Tina Karol's nationwide tour kicked off in Ukraine with the solo tour Sila lyubvi i Golosa, which ended in late February 2014.

On February 6, 2014, the fifth album Pomnyu was released. On February 14 the premiere of the film The Power of Love and the Voice was held, based on the show of the same name

On March 26, 2014, she won the Yuna Music Award in the nomination for Best Singer Of The Year. June 1, 2014, opened a charity foundation "The Pole of Attraction" to help cancer patients. In 2014, the release of the single "#MNOD" was released, and in the same year, a music video for this song was released. In 2015, a video for the song "Ya vse yesche lyublyu" appeared on the screens, in the same year she went on a tour with her team in the cities of Ukraine with the performance "Ya vse yesche lyublyu."

In the winter of 2015, Karol came back as a coach on the second season of The Voice Kids the winner of that season was on her team. On the show, she released "Ukraina – tse ty", which she wrote inspired by children on her team. Latter a video with contestants from the show was released. In spring 2015, she came back as a coach on the fifth season of The Voice of Ukraine. March 25, 2015, won Yuna Music Award in the nomination Best Performer. April 28, 2015, on the anniversary of the death of her husband Yevhen Ohir, released a single "Spasibo"

November 26, 2015, won the M1 Music Awards in the category Best Singer. In winter 2015, she became a star coach in the 6th season of The Voice of Ukraine. In autumn 2016 she became a star coach in the 3rd season of The Voice Kids.

January 22, 2017, President of Ukraine Petro Poroshenko awarded Tina Karol the title of People's Artist of Ukraine.

In winter 2017 she became the star coach in the 7th season of The Voice of Ukraine.

=== 2018 ===
Tina Karol became the face of Ukraine International Airlines (UIA).

March 8, 2018 released a musical film The Intonations of Tina Karol.

April 26, Tina Karol performed a special performance on the air of The Voice of Ukraine. The Ukrainian pop diva performed songs from its platinum plate Intonatsii.

On July 5 she presented a new concert program in Minsk, Belarus.

On July 27 the Viber company released personal stickers of Tina Karol.

On August 26 the 1+1 TV channel released the premiere of the TV version of Tina Karol's musical concert Intonatsii.

August 27, the premiere of the album Intonatsii (Live).

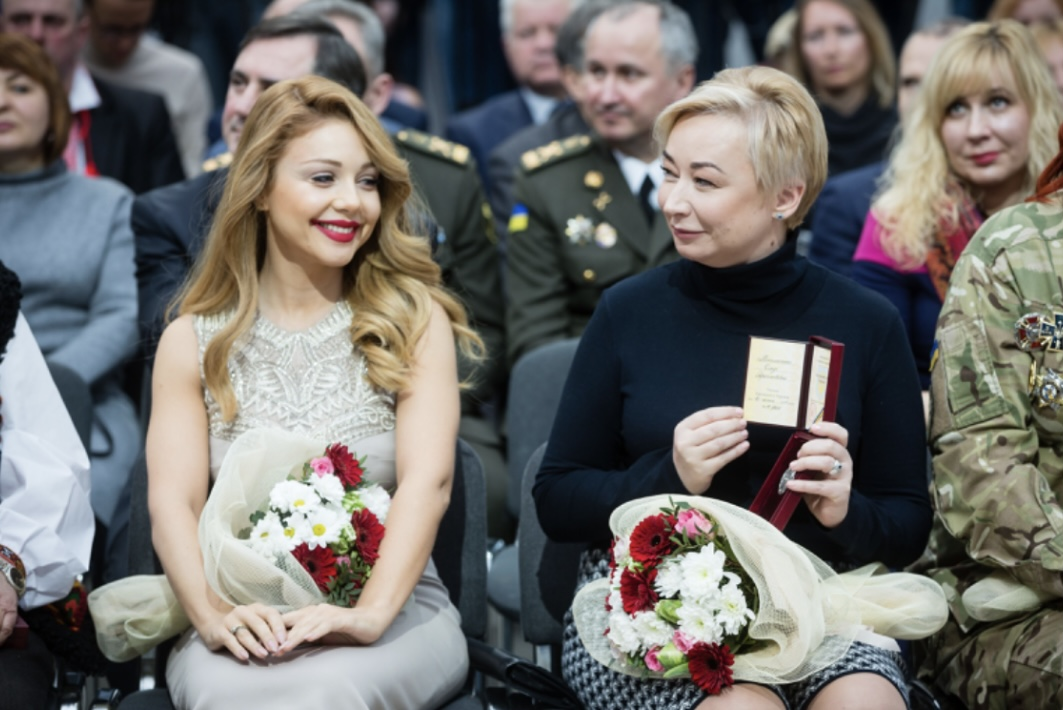
Tina Karol at the ceremony of presenting state awards on the occasion of the Day of Unity of Ukraine in 2017.

In the fall of 2018, Tina Karol again took part in the project Shchyrі-2018 from Elle Ukraine.

On November 13, Tina Karol's Big European Tour began (Israel, Italy, Czech Republic, Moldova).

In winter 2018 she became the star coach in the 9th season of The Voice of Ukraine.

On December 7, the premiere of the new song "Sila vysoty" ("The Power of Heights").

On December 14, The Crashes won at the Best Shorts Competition International Film Festival in the nomination Best Short Film 2018.

=== 2019 ===
April 4, Tina Karol and Boombox released "Bezodnya" ("The Abyss"), which became their first joint work. The idea of a sudden creative tandem belongs to the leader of the band Andriy Khlyvniuk.

On August 22, Tina Karol is back with a brand new single and video clip. The song is entitled "Vabyty" (Attract).

On August 24, Tina Karol took part in the "Procession of Dignity" on the Independence Day of Ukraine. The singer performed a fragment of the national anthem of Ukraine on the roof of the Ukrainian National Tchaikovsky Academy of Music.

In the same month she was the host of “Dancing with the stars” Tantsi z zirkamy. In October, together with the Moldovan singer Dan Balan, she presented the single “Domoy” (Home) at Dancing with the Stars.

In November, Tina Karol became the face and Ambassador of the Ukrainian jewelry brand Ukrzoloto. In the same month she presented a new video for the song " Idi na zhizn " ("Go to the life").

On November 30 Tina Karol and Dan Balan performed the single “Domoy” at the M1 Music Awards.

On December 12, Tina Karol and soloist of The Hardkiss band Julia Sanina presented a duet song “Vilna” (Free) and music video(clip) for it. This single became the soundtrack to the film “Viddana”.

In December 2019, Tina Karol was included in the list of the 100 most influential Ukrainians by Focus, taking the 85th place.

=== 2020–2021 ===
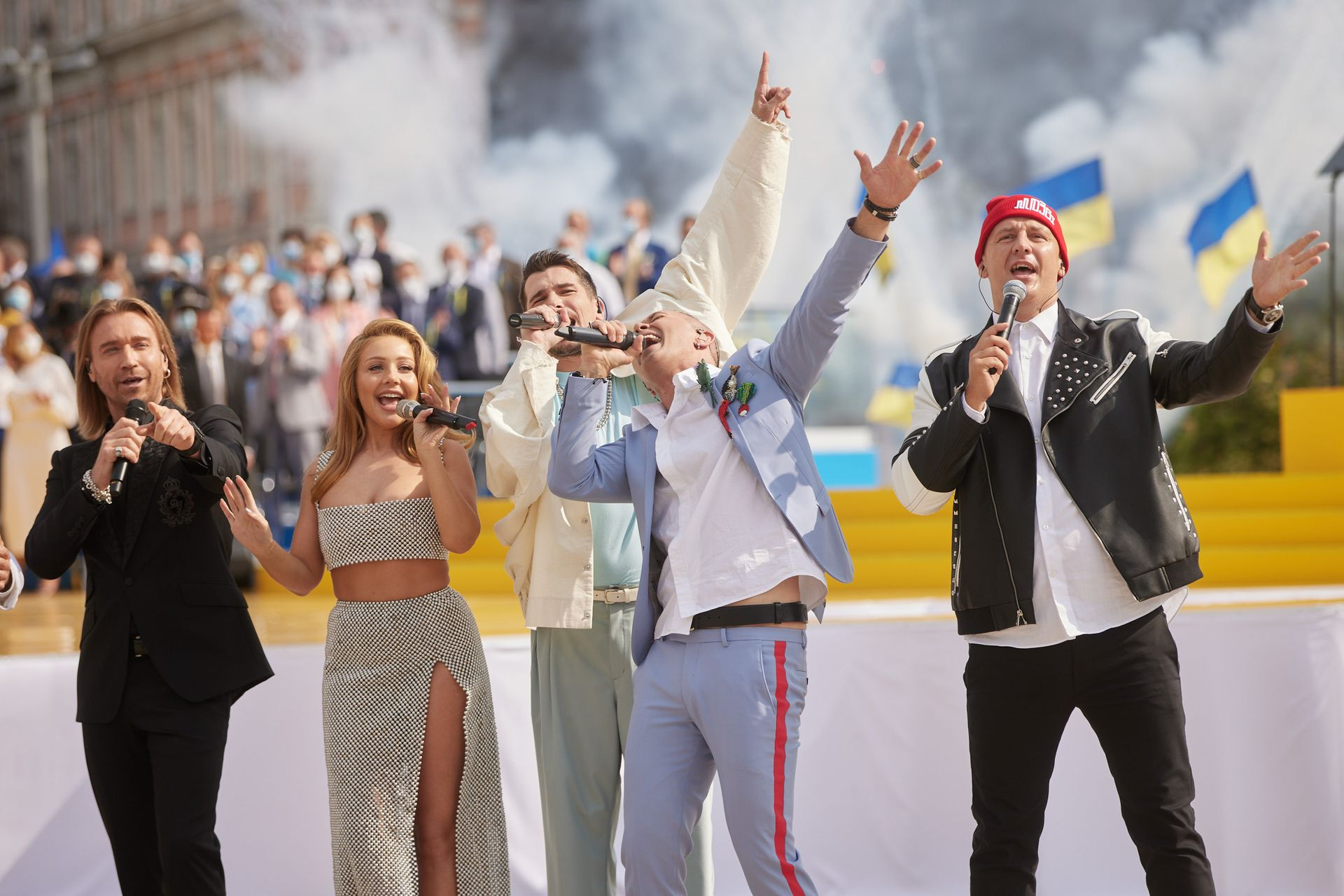
Tina Karol, Oleh Vynnyk, Potap and others. At a concert in honor of the Independence Day of Ukraine in 2020

In winter 2020, she came back as a coach on The Voice of Ukraine.

On February 8, Tina Karol became a judge at Vidbir, Ukraine's National Selection for the Eurovision Song Contest.

"I am glad to become a member of the jury of the national selection of the Eurovision Song Contest, to be part of a large team of a historical event. Definitely we are a singing nation, we can make world-class music. I'm definitely against setting sports standards for creative people and erasing their personality with the desire of a gold medal. As a result of a long creative journey, music always wins. Together we write history today."

On April 26 Tina Karol and Dan Balan on The Voice of Ukraine. presented the song "Pomnish" (Remember). As a coach of Roman Sasanchin, she won The Voice of Ukraine 10 season

On July 7, President of Ukraine Volodymyr Zelenskyy awarded Tina Karol with the Order of Princess Olga III degree on the occasion of the Constitution Day of Ukraine.

On August 24, Tina, together with Monatik, Irina Bilyk, Oleh Vinnik, Potap and others, took part in the show dedicated to the Independence Day of Ukraine on Sofia Square In the same month, together with Yuri Gorbunov, she again became the host of the show Tantsi z zirkamy (Dancing with the Stars).

In September, Karol released the album "Nayti svoikh" (Find Your Own) and the trilogy-clip of the same name In the same month, Tina Karol was awarded her star plate at the "Star Square" near the Gulliver shopping center in Kyiv.

In November, Tina Karol appeared on the cover of the exclusive edition of the "Ukrainian Women in Vogue" book, published by Vogue Ukraine and dedicated to successful Ukrainian businesswomen.

In December, she released her first shoe collection. It was a collaboration with a Ukrainian brand "Kachorovska", which included three items - open toe shoes, clogs and micro bags

On February 12, 2021, she released a music video for the song "Scandal" introducing a whole new repertoire. Later, in winter, she acted as a star coach in a vocal TV-show "The Voice of Ukraine " (Season 11)" on 1+1. In March 2021, together with Potap she became the host at the Lipsync Battle show.

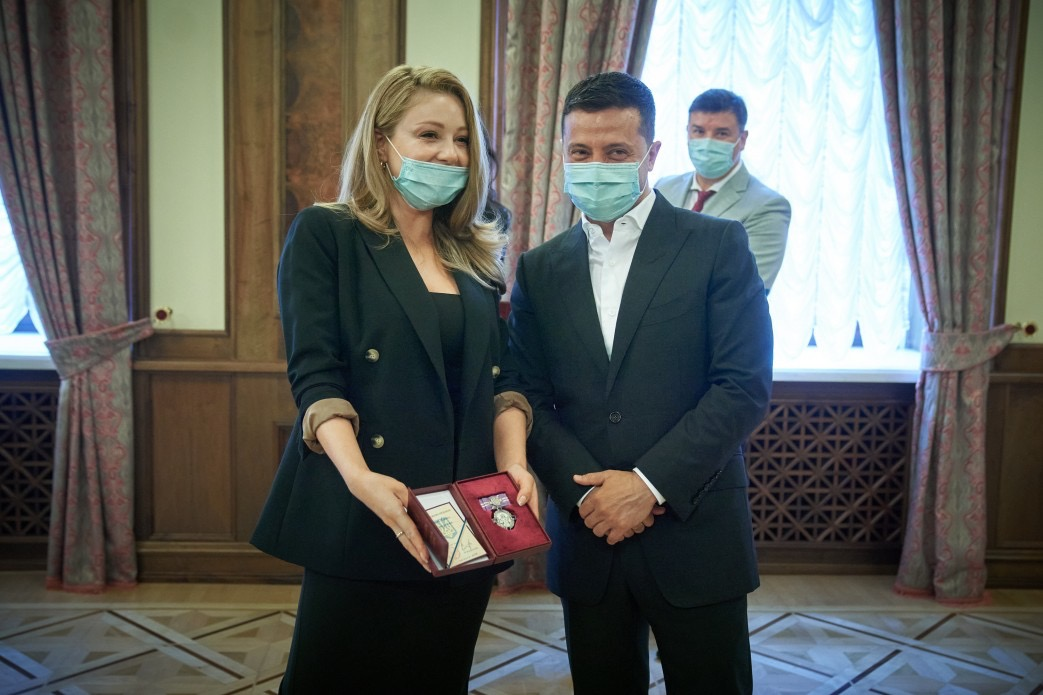
Volodymyr Zelensky and Tina Karol

On April 25, during the finale of "The Voice of Ukraine (Season 11)", Tina Karol declared that she did not plan to be a mentor in the 12th season of the show.

On April 2, she released her eighth album "Krasivo", which included 7 new songs. That same month she presented the live-session "Krasivo" both on her YouTube channel and on 1+1.

On May 12, at the national music awards "YUNA" she was presented a "Special Achievements in Music" award as well as won in two nominations: "Best Movie Soundtrack" (together with Julia Sanina ) and "Best Duet/Collaboration".

On June 16, Tina Karol visited Almaty (Kazakhstan) as part of her promotional tour for the album "Krasivo". There the singer gave several interviews and visited various radio stations.

On June 29, according to Focus magazine Tina Karol was included in "Ukraine's 100 most influential women" list.

On July 1, there was the music video premiere for the song "Krasivo", which is the lead-single of Tina's new album "Krasivo"

On July 5 and 6, 2021, Tina Karol was the headliner of the Atlas Weekend 2021 music festival. She presented a cyber-show in support of her new album "Krasivo". The total number of people in the audience exceeded 250 thousand .

On July 30, the live album "Tina Karol - Cyber Show Atlas Weekend 2021 Live" was released. Musicians both from the US and Ukraine worked on the music and arrangements in the album

On August 13, Tina Karol released the duet song "Zirochka" with the Ukrainian group KAZKA. This was the first track from her Ukrainian-language duet album "Moloda Krov", the release of which is dedicated to the 30th anniversary of the Independence Day of Ukraine.

On August 20, Tina released the album "Moloda Krov" featuring 7 duet songs.

On August 22, Tina Karol together with Natalia Mogilevskaya, Jamala, Sergey Babkin, Olga Polyakova and others performed at the award ceremony of the Presidential Prize "National Legend of Ukraine", established for the Independence Day of Ukraine. The ceremony took place in the Mariinskyi Palace.

On August 24, 2021, Tina Karol together with Andrea Bocelli performed the song "Con te partirò" at Constitution Square. On the same evening, a large-scale musical show "Independence is in our DNA" took place at the NSC Olympiyskiy stadium, where Tina performed a medley of her hits. Tina Karol also performed the song "Ukraina ce ty" at the ceremony dedicated to the 30th anniversary of the NOC.

On October 28, Tina Karol released a music video for the song "Dvoinoy Rai" on her YouTube channel. The single was included in the singer's new album that was released on October 29. On November 9, 2021, Tina Karol went to Kazakhstan to promote her new mini-album "Dvoinoy Rai". There she gave a number of interviews to central TV channels and radio stations.

On November 16, Tina Karol performed her Ukrainian-language hit “Namaluu Tobiі” on "Dancing with the Stars" in Georgia.

On November 23, 2021, together with Kamila Zhusupova, she became the host of the first screenlife singing contest in Kazakhstan called "Double Dauys"

On December 31, 2021, Tina Karol was hiding under the mask of the Snow Queen in a TV-show "New Year's Mask" on "Ukraina" channel. She performed the song "Snezhinka" from the movie "Charodei".

=== 2022 ===
On January 14, in the final of the show "Dancing with the Stars" in Georgia, she sang in a duet with the Georgian performer Anri Jokhadze. The duo surprised with a new version of Tina's hit "Krasivo".

On January 17, 2022, Karol released the concert film “Krasivo. Begu na svet" In February, she became the host of the Talent Games entertainment show along with Mikhailo Khoma and Julia Sanina. In February, she became a judge of the National Vidbir for Eurovision On February 16, together with Mikhailo Poplavsky, she became the host of the "Ukrainian Song of the Year " National music award. Tina received an award in the nomination "Legend of Ukrainian Song".

After the Russian military invasion of Ukraine, on February 24, Tina decided to leave the country and go to Poland, after the first explosions thundered at her house in the suburbs of Kyiv. Together with like-minded people, she created the International Center for Information Resistance, headquartered in Warsaw, to cover the events that are taking place in Ukraine, with a focus on the Russian-speaking audience from Russia, Belarus, Armenia and Kazakhstan

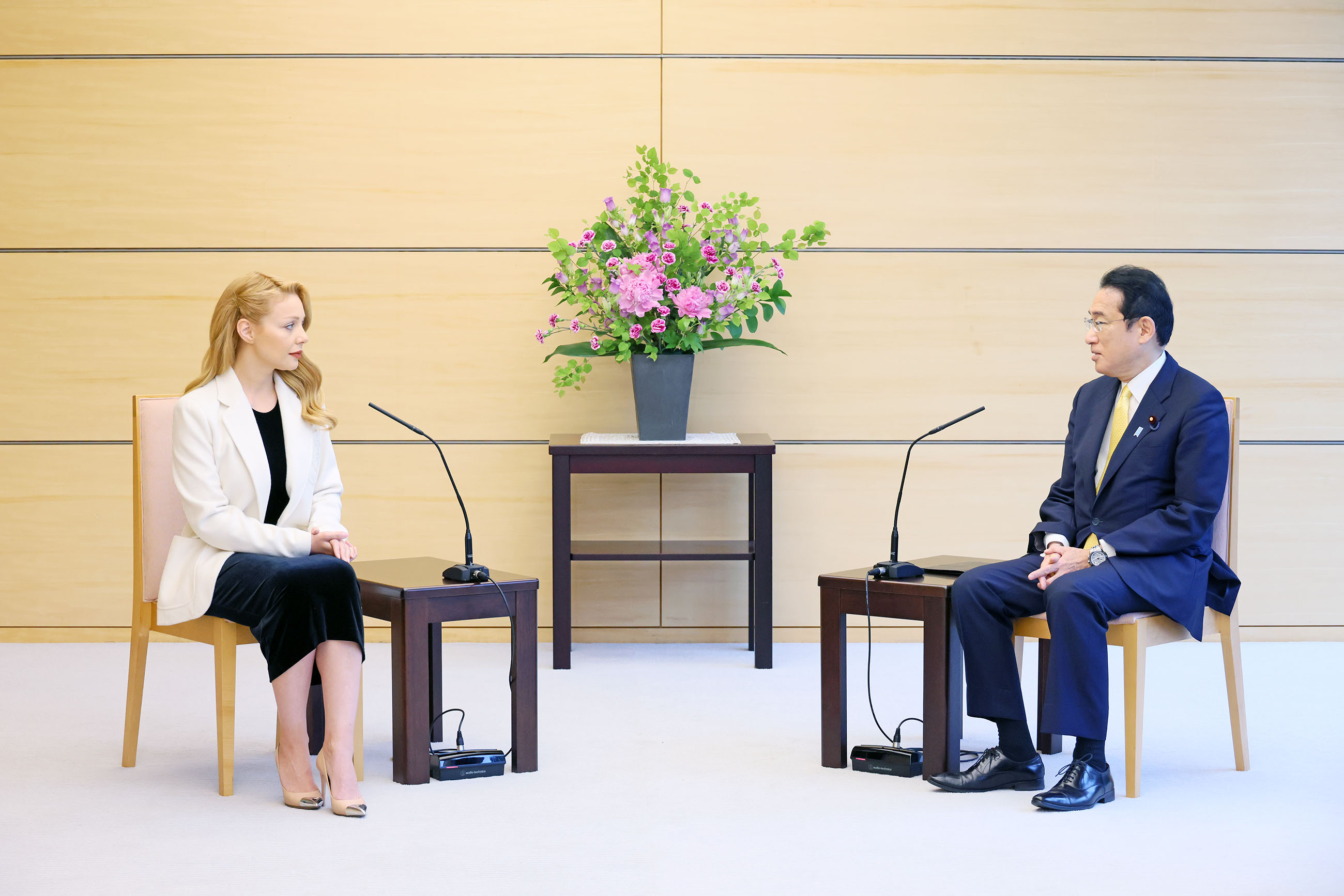
Fumio Kishida and Tina Karol at the Japanese Kantei

On March 30, a charity concert in support of Ukraine was held in Warsaw, where Tina Karol performed the Anthem of Ukraine. All collected money for tickets was donated to UNICEF for the needs of Ukrainian children. The event was held with the support of the Embassy of Ukraine in the Poland at the ROMA theater in Warsaw. On April 12, a charity match "Match For Peace" was held in Poland at the Legia stadium in support of Ukraine. Dynamo (Kyiv) and Legia (Warsaw) met at the stadium. During the break, Ukrainian singers Tina Karol, Nadya Dorofeeva, Kateryna Pavlenko (Go_A) and Julia Sanina (The Hardkiss) sang on the football field. Karol sang the song "Ukraina – tse ty", and also, the singers jointly performed the compositions "Vilna" and "Chervona Kalina" On April 22, Tina Karol performed at the opening of the exhibition "This is Ukraine: Defending Freedom", which is part of the official program of the Venice Biennale, where the singer sang the National Anthem of Ukraine.

On May 8, in Berlin, Tina Karol and Ukrainian Ambassador to Germany Andriy Melnyk took part in a commemorative flower-laying ceremony at the memorial in the Tiergarten on the occasion of the Day of Remembrance and Reconciliation, as well as the 77th anniversary of the liberation of Europe from National Socialism. The singer also sang the Ukrainian Anthem together with the Ukrainian community

On May 10, Tina Karol arrived in Tokyo (Japan) on the mission of a public ambassador, at the invitation of the Japanese businessman and philanthropist Hiroshi Mikitani . Karol performed as a special guest at a concert in support of Ukraine, which took place on May 14, as part of the Rakuten Girls Awards 2022 On May 15, the singer visited Hiroshima, where she met with the mayor of the city Kazumi Matsui, as well as with officials and diplomats of the country On May 19, within the framework of the 75th Cannes Film Festival, a charity evening was organized by the Golden Globe in support of the Ukrainian film industry Tina Karol became a special guest of the charity evening, the singer performed her Ukrainian-language song "Namalyuyu tobi zori".

On August 24, for the Independence Day of Ukraine, Tina Karol surprised Ukrainians by performing the National Anthem in a rather unusual format. As part of the VOGUE VOICES OF NATION project, the artist arranged a 4D performance and appeared in the form of a hologram.

In August Tina Karol became the voice of the collection of the Ukrainian brand Lever Couture, which was worked on by designer Lesya Verlinghieri and creative director of Lady Gaga singer Nicola Formichetti. Especially for the show, the performer created an electronic mini-album LELEKA, imbued with Ukrainian ethnicity and folklore. Tina Karol worked on new songs in collaboration with the American DJ Macro/Micro.

On September 16, Karol presented a new Ukrainian-language single “VILNI.NESKORENI”

On September 23, at a charity evening within the framework of the 77th UN General Assembly, which was held at the Metropolitan Opera in New York, which brought together many world political and business leaders, the presentation of the Olena Zelenska Foundation took place. During the event, Tina Karol and Julia Sanina performed "Vilna"

On September 30, Tina Karol presented the English-language album Scandal. In September–October 2022, a North American tour was held in the cities of USA and Canada.

On December 31, Tina Karol took part in the main New Year's concert in Berlin, Germany, at the foot of the Brandenburg Gate. Karol, along with the band Alphaville, performed the group's famous hit "Forever Young". The concert took place in the open air and was broadcast live on German television.

== Philanthropy ==
The Tina Karol Charity Foundation «The Pole of Attraction» was founded on June 1, 2014, on Children's Day. It is a charity initiative of the singer, which aims to help children oncology departments of city and regional hospitals in all cities of Ukraine.

The Charitable Foundation «The Pole of Attraction» is not a fundraising organization and operates solely through funding from the singer herself: Tina Karol donates funds to the Foundation from solo concerts in the music halls.

Assistance is provided directly to the oncology department of the hospital in purchasing and providing the necessary equipment or medicines.

The list of cities is constantly expanding. Each new city that will be assisted and is currently awaiting the foundation's mission will be listed on the page of the foundation on the singer's website.

The list of assistance already provided is also being complemented and updated.

Tina Karol says:

“There is only one and the most important motivation in my idea to create such a Foundation - it is care. Having experienced this, I understand how lonely parents and children who suffer from this terrible plague of the 21st century feel. I want to bring a little joy, warmth and care to their lives. The overriding goal of my initiative is to inspire people to do good deeds."

On June 7, 2015, in the end of the song project "Holos Krainy - 5", Tina Karol presented an apartment in Kyiv to the winner - her student Anton Kopytin, who was forced to leave Donetsk with his family due to the war in the East of Ukraine.

In 2016 and 2018, she took part in the photo shooting for the charity photo project "Sincerely", dedicated to the Ukrainian national costume and its popularization. All revenue from the sale of calendars was donated to cultural projects, including the Mykhailo Strutynsky Museum of Folk Art, the Novoaidar Museum of Local History and the National Center of Folk Culture "Ivan Honchar Museum".

On March 20, 2022, Tina Karol took part in a large-scale campaign in support of Ukraine (Łódź, Poland), where she sang the songs “Закрили твої очі” ("Closed your eyes") and “Україна – це ти” ("Ukraine is you"). The performance of the latter was joined by Amelia Anisovich, who has become famous throughout the world thanks to the video in which she performs the song from the cartoon "Heart of Ice" in a bomb shelter.

On April 5, 2022, Tina Karol's charity foundation "The Pole of Attraction", in partnership with the Israeli Foundation “Israeli Friends of Ukraine”, purchased the necessary medicines for two hospitals in Ukraine, which specialize in the treatment of children with cancer.

On July 31, 2022, she took part in the anti-war concert - "Voice of Peace" (Almaty, Kazakhstan). Revenue from the concert in the amount of 50,000 dollars was donated to the Tina Karol's charity foundation "The Pole of Attraction", for humanitarian aid to Ukrainian children, as well as to support children's oncology hospitals in Ukraine.

In August 2022, Tina Karol donated an apartment to the family of a 9-year-old boy, Yehor Kravtsov, who in the spring 2022 touched the whole of Ukraine with his diary describing life in occupied Mariupol. The family's new home is now located in the Ivano-Frankivsk region.

During 2022, the Tina Karol Foundation provided assistance to oncology hospitals in Ternopil, Chernivtsi, Khmelnytskyi, Mukachevo, Kharkiv, Lutsk, Odesa, Lviv, and Derhachi for a total amount of over 1.5 million hryvnas.

In January 2023, the Tina Karol Foundation, in cooperation with the head of Rakuten Group and Viber messenger Hiroshi Mikitani, handed over 500 generators from Japan to Ukraine.

== Personal life ==
Tina Karol is an Orthodox Christian. She married her producer Yevhen Ohir in 2008, and gave birth to their son later that year. Ohir died of stomach cancer in 2013, aged 32.

When asked by the Jewish Telegraphic Agency in 2006 whether she identifies as a Jew, she replied "I don't like talking about self-identifications, I feel simply a human being, who came to this world to make a change. There was a period in my life when I was deciding on my religious beliefs, but now I think I've found my stand on this. I believe in God, but I don't identify with any particular religion."

== Discography ==
=== Studio albums ===
Title	Details	Certifications	Sales	Streamings
Show Me Your Love	Released: 16 May 2006; Label: Karol Music, Lavina Music; Format: Cassette, CD, Digital	UKR: Gold	UKR: 50,000	—
Полюс притяжения	Released: 27 December 2007; Label: Astra Records; Format: Cassette, CD, Digital	UKR: Platinum	UKR: 100,000	—
9 жизней	Released: 21 December 2010; Label: Astra Records, Lavina Music; Format: CD, DVD, Digital	UKR: Platinum	UKR: 100,000	—
Помню	Released: 6 February 2014; Label: Not On Label; Format: CD, Digital	UKR: Platinum	UKR: 100,000	—
Интонации	Released: 17 August 2017; Label: Not On Label; Format: CD, Digital	UKR: Multi-Platinum	—N/a	UKR: 2,000,000
Найти своих	Released: 18 September 2020; Label: Not On Label; Format: CD, Digital	—N/a	—N/a	—N/a
Красиво	Released: 2 April 2021; Label: Not On Label; Format: Digital	—N/a	—N/a	—N/a
Молода кров	Released: 20 August 2021; Label: Not On Label; Format: Digital	—N/a	—N/a	—N/a
Scandal	Released: 30 September 2022; Label: Tina Karol; Format: Digital	—N/a	—N/a	—N/a

=== Extended plays ===
Title	Details	Certifications	Sales
Ноченька	Released: 24 December 2006; Label: Lavina Music; Format: CD, Digital	UKR: Gold	UKR: 50,000
Двойной рай	Released: 29 November 2021; Label: Not On Label; Format: Digital		
Leleka	Released: 31 August 2022; Label: Tina Karol; Format: Digital		

=== Live albums ===
Title	Details
Сила любви и голоса	Released: 17 April 2014; Label: Not On Label; Format: Digital
Я всё ещё люблю	Released: 11 November 2015; Label: Not On Label; Format: Digital
Интонации	Released: 27 August 2018; Label: Not On Label; Format: Digital
Юбилейный	Released: 18 December 2020; Label: Not On Label; Format: Digital
Красиво	Released: 30 April 2021; Label: Not On Label; Format: Digital
Cyber Show: Atlas Weekend 2021	Released: 30 July 2021; Label: Not On Label; Format: Digital

=== Compilation albums ===
Title	Details
Девять песен о войне	Released: 7 May 2014; Label: Not On Label; Format: CD
Колядки	Released: 1 January 2015; Label: Not On Label; Format: CD, Digital
Всі хіти	Released: 8 December 2016; Label: Not On Label; Format: Digital
Плейлист весны	Released: 5 April 2019; Label: Not On Label; Format: Digital
Українські пісні	Released: 25 March 2022; Label: Tina Karol; Format: Digital

=== Singles ===
Title	Year	Peak chart positions	Album
Title	Year	UKR	Album
"Show Me Your Love"	2006	4	Show Me Your Love
"Люблю его"	2007	—	Полюс притяжения
"Не бойся, мальчик"	2009	—	9 жизней
"Мы не останемся друзьями"	2015	12	Всі хіти
"Україна — це ти"	2015	21	Колядки
"Я всё ещё люблю"	2015	3	Всі хіти
"Сдаться ты всегда успеешь"	2015	1	Плейлист весны
"Твої гріхи"	2016	3	Интонации
"Blindfold"	2016	—	Non-album singles
"Перечекати"	2016	10	Интонации
"Lost in the Rain"	2016	—	Non-album singles
"Я не перестану"	2017	92	Non-album singles
"Дитинство не втрачай"	2017	—	Non-album singles
"All of Me"	2018	—	Non-album singles
"Step by Step"	2018	—	Non-album singles
"Мужчина моей мечты"	2018	32	Интонации
"Sweet Love"	2018	—	Non-album singles
"Сила высоты"	2018	8	Найти своих
"Безодня" (with Andriy Khlyvniuk)	2019	—	Найти своих
"Вабити"	2019	5	Найти своих
"Иди на жизнь"	2019	25	Найти своих
"Домой" (with Dan Balan)	2019	22	Freedom, Part 2
"Вільна" (with Julia Sanina)	2019	4	Найти своих
"Помнишь" (with Dan Balan)	2020	—	Найти своих
"Blow Your Mind" (with Luca Dayz, Snoop Dogg, L.O.E.)	2020	—	Найти своих
"Heaven"	2020	—	Non-album singles
"Скандал"	2021	11	Красиво
"Phenomenal" (with Luca Dayz, Legendary Marquest)	2021	—	Miungu Ya Muziki
"Красиво"	2021	35	Красиво
"Lovers"	2021	—	Non-album singles
"Зірочка" (with Kazka)	2021	16	Молода кров
"Bounty" (with Latexfauna)	2021	40	Молода кров
"Двойной Рай"	2021	41	Non-album singles
«Спи собі сама»	2022	—	Non-album singles
National Anthem of Ukraine	2022	—	Non-album singles
«Вільні. Нескорені»	2022	13	Non-album singles
«HONEY & МЕД»	2023	—	Non-album singles
"Ветерани"	2024	—	Non-album singles
"—" denotes a single that did not chart or was not released in that territory.

== Other songs ==
- "Ya Budu Tebya Tselovat" (with B.Stone)
- "Posvyashchenie v Albom"
- "Misyats'"
- "Letniy Roman" (with B.Stone)
- "Dusha" (with О.Gavriluk)
- "Heal the World" (Ukrainian Stars, in memory of Michael Jackson)
- "Kartina Lubvi" ("New Wave" festival 2005, Latvia)

== Filmography ==
=== Music videos ===
Year	Title	Director	Ref.
2005	”Выше облаков” (”Vyshe oblakov”/”Higher than clouds”)	German Glinskii	
2006	“Show Me Your Love”	German Glinskii	
2006	”Пупсик” (”Pupsik”/”Baby doll”)	Alan Badoev	
2006	”Ноченька” (”Nochenka”/”The night”)	Alan Badoev	
2007	”Люблю его” (”Lublu ego”/”I love him”)	Alan Badoev	
2007	”Полюс притяжения” (“Polyus prityazheniya” “Pole of attraction”)	Alan Badoev	
2008	”Ключик” (“Klyuchik”/”The key”)	Alan Badoev	
2009	”У неба попросим” (“U neba poprosim”/ “Let's ask the sky”	Igor Zabara	
2009	”Не бойся” (“Ne boysya”/“Don't be afraid”)	Sergiy Solodkyi	
2009	”Radio Baby”	Sergiy Solodkyi	
2010	”Шиншилла” (“Shinshilla”/”Chinchilla”)	Sergiy Solodkyi	
2010	”Не дощ” (“Ne dosch”/” Not rain”)	Sergiy Solodkyi	
2011	”Я скажу Да” (“Ya skzhu Da”/”I'll say Yes”)	Sergiy Solodkyi	
2011	”Зачем я знаю” (“Zachem ya znayu”/”Why do I know”)	Alan Badoev	
2011	”Ніжно” (“Nizhno”/”Tender”)	Alan Badoev	
2011	”Я не беру трубку” (“Ya ne beru trubku”/”I don't pick up the phone”)	Alan Badoev	
2013	”Вьюга-зима” (“Vjuga-zima”/”Snowstorm–winter”)	Hindrek Maazik	
2013	”Помню” (“Pomniu”/”Remember”)	Yaroslav Pilunskyi	
2013	”Жизнь продолжается” (“Zhizn prodolzhaetsya”/”The life goes on”)	Yaroslav Pilunskyi	
2014	”Удаляюсь” (“Udaliaus”/”I'm leaving”)	Dmitriy Konchev	
2014	”Мы не останемся друзьями” (“My ne ostanemsya druzjami”/”We don't stay friends”)	Hindrek Maazik	
2015	”Я все еще люблю” (“Ya vse esche lublu”/”I still love”)	Hindrek Maazik	
2015	”Україна — це ти” (“Ukraina – tse ty”/”Ukraine is you”)	Maksym Deliergiev	
2015	”Сдаться ты всегда успеешь” (“Sdatsya ty vsegda uspeesh”/”You can always give up”)	Hindrek Maazik	
2016	”Твої гріхи” (“Tvoi grihy”/”Your sins”)	GloriaFX	
2016	”Перечекати” (“Perechekaty”/”To wait out”)	Stanislav Morozov	
2017	”Я не перестану” (“Ya ne perestanu”/”I won't stop”)	GloriaFX	
2018	”Всё во мне” (“Vsyo vo mne”/”Everything in me”)	1+1 (TV channel)	
2018	”Земля” (“Zemlya”/”The Earth”)	1+1 (TV channel)	
2018	”Космічні почуття” (“Kosmichni pochuttua”/”The cosmic feelings”)	1+1 (TV channel)	
2018	”Внезапно” (“Vnezapno”/”Suddenly”)	1+1 (TV channel)	
2018	”Шаг, шаг” (“Shug, shug”/”Step, step”)	1+1 (TV channel)	
2018	”Мужчина моей мечты” (“Muzchina moey mechty”/”The Man of my dreams”)	1+1 (TV channel)	
2018	”Дикая вода” (“Dikaya voda”/”The wild water”)	1+1 (TV channel)	
2018	”Сила высоты” (“Sila vysoty”/”The power of height”)	Hindrek Maazik	
2019	”Безодня” (“Bezodnya”/”The abyss”) feat. Andriy Khlyvnyuk	Stanislav Gurenko	
2019	”Вабити” (“Vabyty”/”To attract”)	Tim Milgram	
2019	”Иди на жизнь” (“Idi na zhizn”/”Go for life”)	Polly Pierce	
2019	”Вільна” (“Vilna”/”Free”) feat. Julia Sanina	Hrystyna Syvolap	
2020	”Найти своих” (“Nayti svoih”/”To find your own”)	Stanislav Morozov	
2020	”Лодочка” (“Lodochka”/”The boat”)	Stanislav Morozov	
2020	”Небо” (“Nebo”/”The sky”)	Stanislav Morozov	
2021	”Скандал” (“Scandal”)	Indy Hait	
2021	”Хороший парень” (“Horoshyi paren”/”The good guy”)	Indy Hait	
2021	”Красиво” (“Krasivo”/”Beautiful”)	Indy Hait	
2021	”Двойной рай” (“Dvoynoy ray”/”Double paradise”)	Alina Symonenko	
2022	”Вільні. Нескорені” (“Vilni.Neskoreni”/”Free. Unconquered”)	Ksenia Kargina, Elizaveta Klyuzko	
2023	”Honey & Мед”	Henry Lipatov	

=== Television ===
Year	Title	Role	Notes	Ref.
2005	Хочу бути зіркою (“Hochu buty zirkoyu”/”I want to be a star”)	Host	Competition of young performers	
2006—2007	Танці з зірками (“Tantsi z zirkamy”/”Dances with the stars”)	Host	Ukrainian Dance competition show	
2008	Нова хвиля (“Nova hvylya”/”New Wave (competition)”)	Host	International contest for young music performers	
2008	Моя правда (“Moya Pravda”/”My truth”)	Plays herself	TV program	
2011	Майданс (“Maidans”/“My dance”)	Host	Dance competition show	
2012	Crimea Music Fest	Host	International music festival	
2012	Голос. Діти (“Holos Dity”/”Voice.Kids”)	Star Coach	Ukrainian music talent show for children	
2013	Голос країни (“Holos Krainy”/”The Voice of the Country”)	Star Coach	Music talent show	
2015	Я все еще люблю (“Ya vse esche lublu”/”I still love”)	Plays herself	Music performance	
2015—2016	Голос. Діти (“Holos Dity”/”Voice.Kids”)	Star Coach	Ukrainian music talent show for children	
2015 — 2021	Голос країни (“Holos Krainy”/”The Voice of the Country”)	Star Coach	Music talent show	
2015	Різдвяна історія з Тіною Кароль (“Christmas story with Tina Karol”)	Plays herself	TV music film	
2017—2019	Танці з зірками (“Tantsi z zirkamy”/”Dances with the stars”)	Host	Ukrainian Dance competition show	
2020, 2022	Євробачення. Національний відбір (Vidbir)	Member of the jury	Ukrainian musical selection to the Eurovision Song Contest	
2020	Ліпсінк батл ("Lip Sync Battle”)	Host	Music parody show	
2021	Міс Україна (“Miss Ukraine”)	Member of the jury	Ukrainian National beauty contest	
2021	Double Dauys	Host	Song screenlife-show in Kazakhstan	
2022	Українська пісня року (“Ukrainian Song of the Year”)	Host	Ukrainian National music award	

=== Films and series ===
Year	Title	Notes	Role	Ref.
2006	“Танго любви” ("Tango of love")	Ukrainian melodramatic TV movie	Tina	
2006	”Карнавальная ночь – 2” (“Carnival night – 2”)	Musical movie	Tina	
2007	“Звездные каникулы” ("Star holidays")	New Year's musical comedy	Maria	
2007	”Зірки в Армії” (“Stars in the Army")	Musical television movie	Tina	
2008	“Смешные песни о главном” (“Funny songs about the main thing”)	New Year's musical movie with popular songs from film comedies	Geisha	
2009	”Бригада-М” (”G-Force (film)”)	Comedy animation	Strawberry	
2013	”1+1 удома” (“1+1 at home”)	Ukrainian New Year's musical comedy	Tina	
2019	“Бывшие” (“Former”)	Melodramatic short film	Anna	
2019	“Папик” (“The Dad")	Melodramatic comedy television series	Member of the Jury of the show “Sing”	
2020	“Великі Вуйки 2” (“Great uncles 2")	Ukrainian comedy TV series	Iryna	

=== Documentaries ===
Year	Title	Notes	Ref.
2014	“Сила любви и голоса” ("Power of love and voice")	Musical documentary about the life and work of Tina Karol	
2015	“Я все еще люблю” ("I still love")	Musical performance	
2017	Семь «Интонаций» Тины Кароль (“Seven Intonations” of Tina Karol)	Documentary backstage of 7 Tina Karol's solo concerts at the Palace "Ukraine" in Kyiv	
2020	”Найти своих” (“To find your own”)	Making of trilogy music film	
2021	“Красиво” (“Beautiful”)	Live-session	
2021	”Тина Кароль. Atlas Weekend” (“Tina Karol. Atlas Weekend)	Live concert	
2021	”Тина Кароль. Atlas Weekend: СОЗДАНИЕ” (“Tina Karol. Atlas Weekend: Creation”)	Documentary about the creation of a large-scale concert show	
2021	“Тина Кароль — Двойной рай” (“Tina Karol — Double paradise”)	Making of	
2022	“Красиво. Бегу на свет” (“Beautiful. I'm running to the light")	Musical film-concert	

== Concert tours ==
Year	Title	Ref.
2007	"The Pole of Attraction" (the first concert tour)	
2010	"9 Lives"	
2013–2014	"Power of love and voice" and "Power of love and voice - encore"	
2015	"I still love" (musical performance)	
2016 (January)	New Year's concert tour based on the musical film "A Christmas Story with Tina Karol" with the "Carols" program	
2016 (since January)	Anniversary tour with the "Selected" program (concerts in Great Britain, Latvia, Belarus, USA).	
2017 (January)	"A Christmas Story with Tina Karol"	
2017–2018	"Intonations"	
2021–2022	"Tina Karol. The album "Beautiful" and the greatest hits"	

== Theatre ==
Year	Title	Notes
2003	"Equator" (the musical)	The main female role: Margaret
2004	"Day of Spirits" (the play)	Role: Marfa-storyteller (Kyiv National Academic Molodyy Theatre)
2004	"Assol" (the musical, Austria)	The main role: Assol
2004	"А Mare's Egg" (the play)	Role: Karma of the main character (Tina sings solo throughout the performance without musical accompaniment)

== Books ==
Year	Title	Ref.
2008	"The Great Adventures of the little cobweb"(children's book)	
2016	"A Christmas Story" (children's book)	
2017	"One shot" (photo book in collaboration with a photographer Sebran D’Argent)	

== Honours and awards ==
=== Music and television awards ===
Year	Title	Notes	Ref.
1999	"Black Sea Games" (music festival “Chornomorski igry”)	3rd prize	
2005	New Wave (competition)	2nd place and a special award from Alla Pugacheva	
2006	Teletriumph	Best Children's Program (I Want to be a Star, ICTV)	
2006	Eurovision Song Contest 2006	Representative of Ukraine, 7th place	
2007	Ukrainian Music Award	"Singer of the Year"	
2007	Teletriumph	Best presenter of an entertainment program	
2008	Teletriumph	Best presenter of an entertainment program	
2011	Golden Gramophone Award	Laureate for the song "Ya skazhu da!" ("I'll say yes!")	
2014	YUNA Music Award	"Singer of the Year"	
2014	AOF International Film Festival (USA)	1st prize in the category "Best Documentary" for the film "Tina Karol. The power of love and voice"	
2015	YUNA Music Award	"Singer of the Year"	
2015	ELLE Style Awards	“TV Star of the Year”	
2015	M1 Music Awards	"Singer of the Year"	
2016	M1 Music Awards	Winner in the "Golden Gramophone" nomination with the song "Sdatsa ty vzda ospetesh" (“You can always give up”)	
2017	M1 Music Awards	"Singer of the Year"; Statuette for "The best music video" for the song "To wait"	
2018	YUNA Music Award	"The best Performer of the Year"	
2018	M1 Music Awards	"Singer of the Year"; Special prize "For Contribution to the Development of the National Music Industry"; Statuette for “The best fan club”	
2019	SFAAF International Film Festival	Winner in the nomination "Best Short Film" with the short film "The former"	
2019	“Zolotyj like” (“Golden Like”) Award	Winner in the nominations: "Style Icon" and "Soundtrack of the Year"	
2019	M1 Music Awards	Winner in the nomination "Golden Gramophone" with the song “Sila vysoty” ("The power of height")	
2020	“Zolota Zhar-ptytsa” National Music Award ("Golden Firebird" Music Award)	Winner in the "Ballad of the Year" nomination with the song "Free"	
2020	Star's Square (Kyiv)	Ceremonial opening of the “Tina Karol” personal star	
2021	YUNA Music Award	Winner in the nominations: "For Special Achievement in Music"; "Best Duet/Collaboration" ("Free"); "Best Song for a Movie"	
2021	Focus (Ukrainian magazine). Rating “100 Most influential women of Ukraine”	65th place	
2022	"Ukrainian Song of the Year” (National music awards)	"Legend of Ukrainian Song"	

=== State and church honors ===
Year	Title	Notes	Ref.
2006	Medal "For Work and Success"	“For many years of conscientious work and exemplary performance of duties”	
2007	International Order of St. Stanislaus	"For establishing the international authority of Ukraine and significant contribution to the development of culture and art of Ukraine"	
2009	Merited Artist of Ukraine	On the occasion of the Day of Unity of Ukraine (Unification Act)	
2017	People's Artist of Ukraine	The official ceremony took place in the National Museum Taras Shevchenko in Kyiv	
2020	Order of Princess Olga, 3rd class	On the occasion of the Constitution Day (Ukraine)	

=== Media awards ===
Year	Title	Notes	Ref.
2006	"Edinstvennaya" magazine raiting	"Woman of the Year — 2005"	
2008	"VIVA!" magazine “The most beautiful people” award	"The most beautiful Woman of Ukraine"	
2008	"Women's Magazine" raiting	"The most charming Woman of Ukraine"	
2009	Miss Ukraine Universe	"The most beautiful Singer of Ukraine — 2008"	
2013	Google and Yandex raitings in Ukraine	"The most popular Woman of Ukraine"	
2017	"VIVA!" magazine “The most beautiful people” award	"The most beautiful Woman of Ukraine"	

== See also ==
- Ukraine in the Eurovision Song Contest 2006

== Notes ==
Awards and achievements
Preceded by GreenJolly with "Razom nas bahato"	Ukraine in the Eurovision Song Contest; 2006	Succeeded by Verka Serduchka with "Dancing Lasha Tumbai"
Preceded by Natalia Mohylevska	Most beautiful by VIVA! 2007-2008; With: Savik Shuster 2007; Volodymyr Zelenskyy 2008	Succeeded by Nastya Kamenskih
Suspended Title last held by Ani Lorak (2012)	Most beautiful by VIVA! 2017 (3rd title); With: Dmytro Komarov	Succeeded by Olya Polyakova
