= Cranes (2017 song) =

"Журавлі"
- Cover of the single

Song by The Hardkiss
- Language: Ukrainian
- English title: Cranes
- Released: 20 July 2017
- Genre: pop
- Length: 2:48
- Songwriter: Julia Sanina
- Composers: Julia Sanina; Val Bebko

"Cranes" (Ukrainian: "Журавлі") is the first single by the Ukrainian band The Hardkiss. The Ukrainian-language lyrical and minimalist pop song was released in July 2017 and included on the band's third studio album, Iron Swallow (Ukrainian: Залізна ластівка), in September 2018. The band's lead singer, Julia Sanina, wrote the song while on tour. "Cranes" made the band popular.

== Background ==
The band's lead singer, Julia Sanina, composed the song in a hotel room on her guitar while on tour. When The Hardkiss recorded the song in a studio, they decided to preserve the original minimalist atmosphere by focussing on voice and melody.

I often write about dramas, and here I wanted to create a light song, I wanted light tenderness. This song is not like anything we've done before. I doubted whether we would take it into work. But the reaction of Val, the musicians and all our friends to "The Crane" was so touching that there were no doubts left.

— Julia Sanina

== Music video ==
The song was released on 21 July 2017 as a music video on YouTube, exceeding one million views in its first month. The video was directed by Val Bebko, the band's creative producer and guitarist. Bebko is married to Sanina.

We filmed such acoustic stories at the very beginning of our creative journey. We returned to this format, because it is most appropriate here. Nothing distracts from the song, the performer and the experiences. Personally, for me, b/w and the emphasis on Yulia's eyes are my favourite atmosphere.

— Val Bebko

As of August 2026, the video clip has 38 million views, which places it in 45th place on the most popular Ukrainian-language music videos on YouTube.

== Use and influence ==
The lyrical pop song "Cranes" made the band popular. It was included in the band's studio album Iron Swallow (Ukrainian: Залізна ластівка), which was released in September 2018. It is the band's first music video for a Ukrainian-language song to surpass one million views on YouTube. There are many cover versions of this song. In particular, the version made by Naviband, which represented Belarus at the Eurovision Song Contest 2017 in Kyiv, has become popular.

== Awards and nominations ==
Year	Competition	Award	Result	Reference
2017	YUNA	Best song in Ukrainian	Won	
2017	YUNA	Best song	Nominated	
2017	M1 Music Awards	Joint project of M1 and KissFM "Dance Parade"	Nominated	
2018	Golden Firebird	Ballad of the Year	Won	
