= Perfection Is a Lie =

2017 studio album by the Hardkiss

Studio album by The Hardkiss
- Released: April 7, 2017
- Length: 43:03
- Languages: English (1–5, 7–12); Ukrainian (6)
- Label: Comp

The Hardkiss chronology
Cold Altair (2015)	Perfection Is a Lie (2017)	Zalizna Lastivka (2018)

Perfection Is a Lie is the second studio album by the Ukrainian band The Hardkiss. The album was released on 7 April 2017. The album consisted of some of the band's hit songs between the years of 2015–2017, as all of the songs on the album were only released as singles before.

== Background ==
The album consists of the band's hit songs over the last two years, with 11 songs in the album, along with the outro to "Антарктида", their newest single up to that point. According to the band's lead vocalist, Julia Sanina, the last two years of the band were spent (translated to English) "in a very exciting way". The band's guitarist, Val Bebko, reported that while the band had put focus on their singles, that they did not want to forget about fans who liked to collect albums.

The album contains 11 tracks that are sung completely in English, while one, "Антарктида", is in Ukrainian.

=== Release ===
The album would first premiere on Ukrainian radio station NRJ Ukraine. The album would be released digitally on most music streaming apps, along with physical copies being made that were sold at future The Hardkiss concerts.

== Track listing ==
No.	Title	Length
1.	"Organ"	3:18
2.	"Tony, Talk!"	3:35
3.	"Doctor Thomases"	4:07
4.	"Rain"	3:27
5.	"Helpless"	3:36
6.	"Антарктида"	3:58
7.	"A2"	0:38
8.	"Perfection"	3:55
9.	"Closer"	3:59
10.	"PiBiP"	4:15
11.	"Hammer"	4:07
12.	"Altair"	4:07
Total length:		43:03
