= Show Me Your Love =

Show Me Your Love may refer to:

- Show Me Your Love (album), a 2006 album by Tina Karol, or the title song
- "Show Me Your Love" (Fady Maalouf song), 2008
- "Show Me Your Love" (TVXQ and Super Junior song), 2005
- "Show Me Your Love", a song by The Chevelles
- "Show Me Your Love", a song by Clover
- "Show Me Your Love", a song by Emi Maria from Contrast
- "Show Me Your Love", a song by Firebeatz and Lucas & Steve, 2017
- "Show Me Your Love", a song by Immature from the film soundtrack album Kazaam
- "Show Me Your Love", a song by The Rembrandts from The Rembrandts
- "Show Me Your Love", a song by S.E.S. from A Letter from Greenland
- "Show Me Your Love", a song by The Temptations from Surface Thrills
- "Feels So Good (Show Me Your Love)", a song by Lina Santiago
- Show Me Your Love (film), a 2016 Hong Kong drama film directed by Ryon Lee and starring Nina Paw and Raymond Wong

== See also ==
- Show Me Love (disambiguation)
