= Zalizna Lastivka =

Залізна ластівка

Studio album by The Hardkiss
- Released: September 19, 2018
- Length: 52:57
- Language: Ukrainian (1–3, 6–9, 11, 12–15, 17); English (4–5, 10, 16)
- Label: Comp

The Hardkiss chronology
Perfection Is a Lie (2017)	Залізна ластівка (2018)	Акустика. Live (2020)

Zalizna Lastivka (Ukrainian: Залізна ластівка, transl. Iron Swallow) is the third studio album by the Ukrainian band The Hardkiss. It released on September 19, 2018.

== Background ==
According to the Hardkiss, work on the album lasted for two years. The band began producing the album on February 21, 2017 on International Mother Language Day, by first presenting their song "Антарктида". The album consists of 13 songs and four poems, most of which are in Ukrainian. Julia Sanina, the band's vocalist, said the inclusion of poems was the realization of her childhood dream of publishing her own collection of poems.

On July 21, 2017, the Hardkiss would release the band's lead single, "Журавлі". A music video was also released on YouTube that day. The music video would become a viral sensation in Ukraine, garnering over 24 million views as of October 5, 2021. The song would help the band win the Yuna and Gold Firebird Awards, along with the 2017 M1 Music Awards. According to Sanina, the song was created in a hotel room in 20 minutes. In an article, she said that the song was different than what fans expect from The Hardkiss musically.

"Before listening to a new song, cross out everything you're used to before, what you know about The Hardkiss and expect from us musically. After all, "Журавлі" is a very unexpected song that was born quickly and was recorded by us just as quickly. It is very gentle, natural, and, for me personally, symbolizes intimacy with nature. It has a minimum of tools and a maximum of feelings! I don't even know how they will perceive "Журавлі"... I know for sure that this work is very honest. As for the video, I probably wouldn't even call it a full-fledged video, but would call it a kind of accompanying video art. It doesn't have the usual plots or active footage, in short, you will see everything for yourself". – Julia Sanina (translated to English)

Between the fall of 2017 and the spring of 2018, the band released two more songs, both in Ukrainian: "Кораблі" and "Мелодія". After releasing the two songs, the band realized their musical style would change slightly. Sanina described the album sound as more electronic than the band's previous work. She compared the new album to "a whole cocoon, in which its atmosphere prevails". Sanina noted that the album title refers both to a spaceship maintaining a clear course and to the image of a woman.

== Track listing ==
No.	Title	Length
1.	"Привіт"	0:49
2.	"Журавлі"	2:48
3.	"Коханці"	4:01
4.	"Forever More"	3:47
5.	"Free Me"	3:12
6.	"Серце"	2:51
7.	"Mope"	1:05
8.	"Кораблі"	3:23
9.	"Де ти є"	4:18
10.	"Does It Feel"	4:39
11.	"Хто, як не ти"	3:33
12.	"00:00"	4:16
13.	"Мелодія"	3:54
14.	"Андромеда"	1:19
15.	"Астронавт"	3:43
16.	"Complicity"	3:49
17.	"Бувай"	1:30
Total length:		52:57

== Reception ==
Reception for the album was mainly positive from both fans and music critics. Ihor Panasov of Karabas Live reported that "If you don't know how to tell stories, don't release albums... The Hardkiss is just made for big beautiful stories. But for many years [Sanina] was not up to it. Under the guise of albums, [Sanina] released mechanical compilations – Stones And Honey (2014), Cold Altair (EP, 2015), Perfection Is a Lie (2017). There was nothing special to tell about [the albums]. Until today".
