= Pitchfork Music Festival Paris 2014 =

Music festival

- Dates: 30 October–1 November 2014
- Locations: Grande halle de la Villette, Paris, France
- Website: pitchforkmusicfestival.fr

The Pitchfork Music Festival Paris 2014 was held on 30 October to 1 November 2014 at the Grande halle de la Villette, Paris, France. The festival was headlined by Belle and Sebastian, Caribou and James Blake.

== Lineup ==
Headline performers are listed in boldface. Artists listed from latest to earliest set times.

Thursday, 30 October	Friday, 31 October	Saturday, 1 November
**James Blake**; Jon Hopkins; Mogwai; The War on Drugs; The Notwist; How to Dress Well; Ought	**Belle and Sebastian**; St. Vincent; Chvrches; MØ; Future Islands; Son Lux; D.D Dumbo; Perfect Pussy	Kaytranada; Jamie xx Four Tet; **Caribou**; Jungle; José González tUnE-yArDs; Foxygen; Movement; Kwamie Liv; Tobias Jesso Jr. Charlotte OC; Jessy Lanza

=== Opening Night and After Party lineups ===
The opening night was held on 29 October at Le Trabendo. The after parties were held in collaboration with Red Bull Music Academy at Le Trabendo on 30 and 31 October.

Opening Night (Wednesday, 29 October)	Afterparty (Thursday, 30 October)	Afterparty (Friday, 31 October)
Kindness; Kelela; Hawk House; Shura	Joy Orbison; Martyn; Ryan Elliott; Felix	Lunice; Fatima Al Qadiri; Sophie; Tourist; Douchka
