= Tina Karol Charitable Foundation =

2014 Ukrainian charitable organization

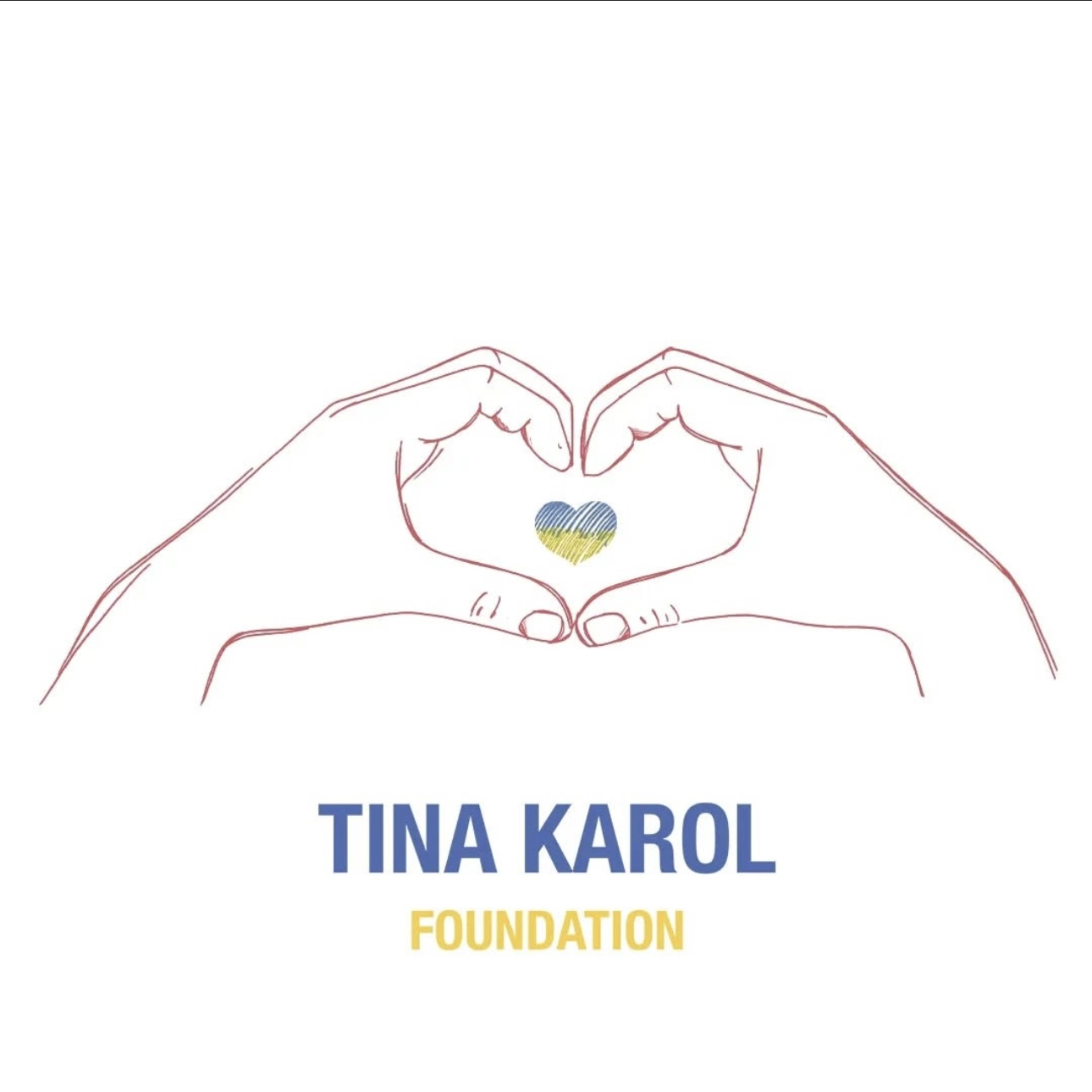
- Formation: 2014; 12 years ago
- Founders: Tina Karol
- Type: Foundation (nonprofit)
- Purpose: Helping children's oncology departments in Ukraine
- Headquarters: Kyiv, Ukraine
- Region served: Ukraine
- Website: fund.tinakarol.com
- Formerly called: The Pole of Attraction

The Tina Karol Charitable Foundation is a Ukrainian charitable organization that helps children's oncology departments of city and regional hospitals in Ukraine. Assistance is provided directly to oncology departments of hospitals in the purchase and supply of necessary equipment or medicines.

The Foundation was established on 1 June 2014, and operates mostly at the expense of singer Tina Karol, who transfers part of the profit from all solo concerts to the Fund's account.

== History ==
The Fund was established by Ukrainian singer Tina Karol on 1 June 2014 — in honor of the International Children's Day. Until 2016, the foundation was called "The Pole of Attraction" and in April 2016 the organization was renamed to "The Tina Karol Charitable Foundation".

== Activities ==
On 27 July 2014, a charity online store was opened on Karol's website with the aim of transferring all the received funds to help children with cancer.

In 2014, the Foundation received Tina Karol's fees from 26 concerts of the solo concert tour "The Power of Love and Voice", as well as the funds from her solo concert held before the New Year 2015 in Kyiv at the Palace of Culture "Ukraine".

In April 2015, the Fund gathered all the revenues from Tina Karol's concert "I still love" at the Palace of Culture "Ukraine". With these funds, the necessary medical equipment was purchased for hematology department of the Ternopil Children's Clinical Hospital. In total, in 2015 "The Tina Karol charitable foundation" helped 25 Ukrainian oncology hospitals.

On 1 June 2017, Tina Karol's foundation transferred 200,000 hryvnias to oncology departments in the cities of Mykolaiv, Zaporizhzhia, and Kropyvnytskyi.

In autumn 2017 Karol performed seven concerts in a row at the Palace "Ukraine" and made the seventh show charitable. Children and doctors, who are helped by "The Tina Karol Charitable Foundation", were invited to it.

In 2018, the Foundation provided 500,000 hryvnias to help children's oncology hospitals in Ukraine. Hospitals in Zaporizhzhia, Mykolaiv, Kropyvnytskyi, Lysychansk, Sumy, Kharkiv and Odesa received the necessary medicines.

After the full-scale Russian invasion of Ukraine on 24 February 2022, "The Tina Karol Charitable Foundation" expanded its activities. A separate direction of the fund's work in 2022 became helping Ukrainians who suffered from the military actions of the Russian Federation against Ukraine, as well as supporting the children of Ukrainian defenders. In particular, the fund provided assistance to military women, purchased a car for the reconnaissance group of the Armed Forces of Ukraine and bought waterproof uniforms for border units of the Armed Forces of Ukraine.

On 26 March 2022, a "Unite for Ukraine" charity concert was held in Tel Aviv, at which Tina Karol raised money for the purchase of medicines for a hospital in Dnipro. The concert was held with the support of the Embassy of Ukraine in Israel and collected 2 million hryvnias.

On 5 April 2022, "The Tina Karol Charitable Foundation", in partnership with the Israeli Foundation "Israeli Friends of Ukraine", purchased the necessary medicines for two Ukrainian hospitals, which specialize in the treatment of children with cancer. The singer emphasized that during the war, her foundation would continue working and helping children fight cancer.

On 31 July 2022, an anti-war concert of Ukrainian and Kazakh stars – "Voice of Peace" took place in Almaty (Kazakhstan). Proceeds from the concert in the amount of 50,000 dollars were transferred to Karol's Foundation for humanitarian aid to Ukrainian children, as well as to support children's oncology hospitals of Ukraine.

In the fall of 2022, "The Tina Karol Charitable Foundation" implemented "School backpack" project, within the framework of which the necessary school supplies were purchased for the children of soldiers of the Azov Brigade, who went to the first grade. Each family was given a "school backpack", which included all the necessary things for studying for a whole year, a total of 94 units of school supplies for each future student.

On 19 December 2022, the Fund provided assistance to the Cherkasy Regional Oncology Dispensary, handing over the necessary stock of medicines and a special refrigerator for their storage to the children's department. As part of its activities, the foundation provided assistance with a donation received from the proceeds of the "Voice of Peace" concert, which took place in Almaty in July 2022, in support of Ukraine.

In general, during 2022, "The Tina Karol Charitable Foundation" provided assistance to oncology hospitals in Ternopil, Chernivtsi, Khmelnytskyi, Mukachevo, Kharkiv, Lutsk, Odesa, Lviv, and Derhachi in a total amount of over 1.5 million hryvnias.

In January 2023, in cooperation with the head of Rakuten Group and Viber messenger Hiroshi Mikitani, the Fund handed over 500 power generators to Ukraine. All the devices were delivered to the respective Ukrainian cities, whose energy system were most damaged by the Russian shelling. The total cost of generators was estimated around 900 thousand dollars.

At the beginning of June 2023, after the Destruction of the Kakhovka Dam, Foundation purchased and sent to the victims in Kherson the necessary equipment: boats, overalls, and life vests.

== Geography ==
The assistance of "The Tina Karol charitable foundation" covered all the regions of Ukraine during its activity.
