= Show Me Love =

Show Me Love may refer to:

== Film and television ==
- Show Me Love (film) or Fucking Åmål, a 1998 Swedish film
- Show Me Love (TV series), a Thai TV series
- "Show Me Love" (Dawson's Creek), a television episode

== Music ==
- Show Me Love (album) or the title song (see below), by Robin S., 1993
- "Show Me Love" (Alicia Keys and Miguel song), 2019
- "Show Me Love" (Bressie song), 2013
- "Show Me Love" (Robin S. song), 1990
- "Show Me Love" (Robin Schulz song), 2015
- "Show Me Love" (Robyn song), 1997
- "Show Me Love" (Tove Styrke song), 2022
- "Show Me Love" (t.A.T.u. song), 2002
- "Show Me Love" (WizTheMc and Bees & Honey song), 2025
- "Show Me Love" (Yaki-Da song), 1994
- "Show Me Love (America)", by the Wanted, 2013
- "Show Me Love (Not a Dream)", by Hikaru Utada, 2010
- "Show Me Love", by Armin van Buuren from Balance, 2019
- "Show Me Love", by Delorentos, 2014
- "Show Me Love", by Hundred Waters, 2014
- "Show Me Love", by Riize from Odyssey, 2025

== See also ==
- Show Me Your Love (disambiguation)
