= SadSvit =

Ukrainian singer-songwriter

- SadSvit in 2022

Background information
- Born: Bohdan Rozvadovskyi (Богдан Розвадовський); 1 May 2004 (age 22); Ivano-Frankivsk, Ukraine
- Genre: Post-punk
- Years active: 2019–present

Bohdan Rozvadovskyi (Ukrainian: Богдан Розвадовський; born 1 May 2004), professionally known by his stage name SadSvit, (Note: Sometimes rendered as "Седсвіт") is a Ukrainian post-punk singer, songwriter, and record producer. He embarked on a musical career in 2019 by collaborating with the artist named "Someone from the West" (Хтось із Заходу), later recorded the song "My Dimension" (Мій Вимір).

== Early and personal life ==
Rozvadovskyi was born on 1 May 2004 in Ivano-Frankivsk, Ukraine. He later studied within the Faculty of Law of Precarpathian National University (PNU).

After the Russian invasion of Ukraine in 2022, he moved from Ukraine to Vienna, later settling in the city of Warsaw. In November 2025, he confirmed that he had returned to Ukraine.

== Musical career ==
Rozvadovskyi stated that he first became interested in music when he was three to four years old when he got a children's synthesizer, and then an actual one when he was 10. After he was eventually gifted a laptop, he downloaded the app FL Studio, where he started recording synthwave tracks, before becoming interested in post-punk starting in 2019 after being inspired by The Cure and Joy Division. Rozvadovskyi started his solo career as a musician in 2020 when he released the Russian-language song "Razbitye mechty" (Broken Dreams). He later stated in an interview that he had prior to this recorded the also Russian-language album "Метушня" (Commotion), although it did not garner attention. Afterwards, he transitioned into using the pseudonym SadSvit when he followed the release with the song "Ne Zabuvai" (Don't Forget), and started singing in the Ukrainian language. The name SadSvit is a portmanteau of the English word "sad" and the Ukrainian-language word "svit", which means world in English. The two words combined mean "the sad world".

In 2021, he released his debut studio album Cassette. The single "Molodist" from the album became popular on the social media app TikTok soon after, leading to the song rising within the Ukraine Top 100 charts on Spotify at 95th place. In April 2022, during the Battle of Mariupol, the Azov Regiment released a video entitled the "Defenders of Mariupol", which was set to his song "Cassette" from the album. The video garnered attention on Telegram, and led to SadSvit's breakthrough, as it topped the Spotify Viral 50 and the Shazam Top 200 charts. The song was then featured on the Ukrainian video game S.T.A.L.K.E.R. 2: Heart of Chornobyl, leading it to re-enter the Ukrainian charts at the top of the Ukrainian Top 50 on Spotify.

On 14 February 2025, he released a joint track with Tina Karol called "МИ" (We), which is about how even if the world is destroyed, "we" still remain. An accompanying music video was also released, and was directed by Nata Kurgan. He said the collaboration came out of Karol messaging him on Instagram in mid-December 2024, and they later met up at a concert in Warsaw. In May 2025, he collaborated with new wave singer Artem Pyvovarov for the single "Терпи" (Be Patient). In August 2025, he released the single "Relay of Suffering", which was a collaborative track with the singer Apatia. The song explores a love triangle between two boys and a girl.

In May 2025, SadSvit announced that he would be performing a mini set of concert starting in three cities in Poland: Warsaw, Kraków, and Wrocław. He would then visit Germany and the Czech Republic. After the shows, he donated 1.3 million hryvnias to the Armed Forces of Ukraine in support of the country's defence. Afterwards, he confirmed he would be doing a tour entitled "Місце сили" (Palace of Power), which would exclusively tour through Ukrainian cities. The tour began in Lviv at Malevich Concert Arena on 30 April 2026. There was one exclusive show, on 29 May 2026, in Kyiv at the Dovzhenko Film Studios, as it was a 100% charity concert for the Armed Forces of Ukraine.

== Discography ==
=== Albums ===
- Cassette (2021)
- 20&21 (2021)
- Неонова мрія (2023)
- Цвіт магнолії (2024)

=== Singles and EPs ===
- Досі не придумав (2021)
- Wild Illusion (2021)
- Двоє (2022)
- Небо (2022)
- Персонажі (2022)
- Cassette (Remix) (2022)
- Світанок (2022)
- Додому (2022)
- Квартали (2022)
- Повертайся живим (2022)
- Додому (Xenjes remix, 2022)
- Була весна (2022)
- Силуети (2022)
- Твоя душа (2023)
- Автомагістралі (2023)
- Дотики (2023)
- Квіти (2023)
- Персонажі (Live, 2023)
- Луги (2024)
- Напевно ти (2024)
- Терпи (Be Patient, 2025) (with Artem Pyvovarov)
- Естафета страждань (Relay of Suffering, 2025) (with Apatia)
