= Bondage Fairies (band) =

Swedish band

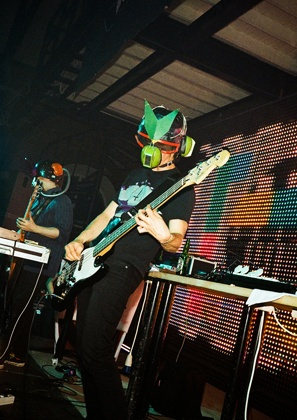
- The band performing in 2009

Background information
- Origin: Stockholm, Sweden
- Genres: Synth-punk, 8-bit, punk rock
- Years active: 2005–present
- Labels: Lobotom, Audiolith
- Members: Elvis Creep – vocals, lyrics and music Dallas Pumpkin (since 2013) – bass guitar Scott Hole (since 2014) – guitar Drummer Boy (since 2011) – drums
- Past members: Deus Deceptor (2005–2011) – bass guitar, synthesizer Bee Bee Prime (2010–2013) – guitar Dr. Professor (2013–2015) – guitar The Horse (2011–2012) – bass guitar
- Website: Facebook page

Bondage Fairies is a Swedish band formed in 2005. It was founded by the musicians Elvis Creep and Deus Deceptor. The name was borrowed from the pornographic manga of the same name about fairies. The band members wear masks. The musicians themselves describe their style as "electropunk oldschool". The band has toured Europe and Russia on numerous occasions.

== History ==
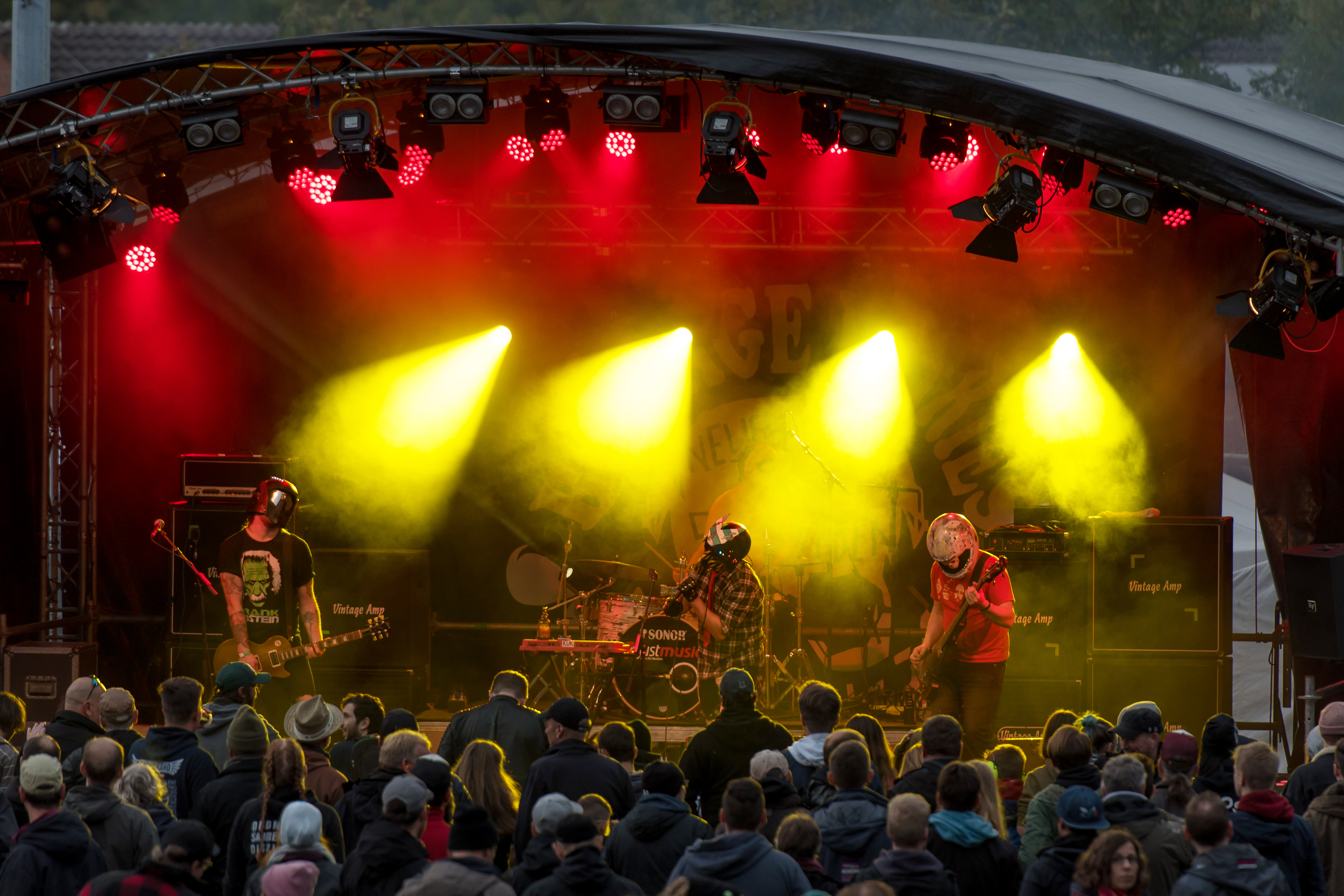
Bondage Fairies in 2017.

Elvis Creep and Deus Deceptor founded Bondage Fairies in 2005 in Stockholm. That same year they released their first single, "He-Man", on vinyl. On 20 January 2006, their first album, What You Didn't Know When You Hired Me, was released on Lobotom Records. In 2008, the single "Garbage Indiebands" was released, which was included on their second album, Cheap Italian Wine, released on 8 September 2009 on Lobotom Records.

The third single, "1-0", was released on 8 April 2011 on Audiolith Records exclusively as an MP3 download; it was accompanied by a remix of the song "nv4.dll" by Der Tante Renate and an acoustic version of "Forget the Image, I Got a Heart". In addition to this single, the band's first official music video was filmed in Hamburg. In 2011, Drummer Boy joined the band; some time later a fourth member, Bee Bee Prime, was taken on as guitarist. After releasing another single ("Fantasy Outfit") on SoundCloud on 23 December 2011, Bondage Fairies released their third album on 20 January 2012.

Among other things, thanks to their numerous concerts, which took the form of distinctive stage shows, the band built up a considerable fan base, particularly in some Eastern European countries as well as in Germany and the United States. The band members wear homemade masks in photographs and on stage.

On 20 July 2017, a music video for the song "Satan You and Me, pt. II", directed by Ivan Chekhov in Yekaterinburg, was released. Russian actors appeared in the video.

On 21 July 2017, the new album Alfa Gaga Cp Wifi was released.

=== Musical style ===
A characteristic feature of Bondage Fairies is fast guitar riffs backed by electronically generated melodies reminiscent of the sound chip of the C64 computer. Speech samples are also frequently used. With the exception of "Gay Wedding", which was recorded almost entirely without electronic elements, the drums on the first two albums were composed exclusively by electronic means, whereas for the third album the drums were mostly recorded in a studio.

=== Lyrics ===
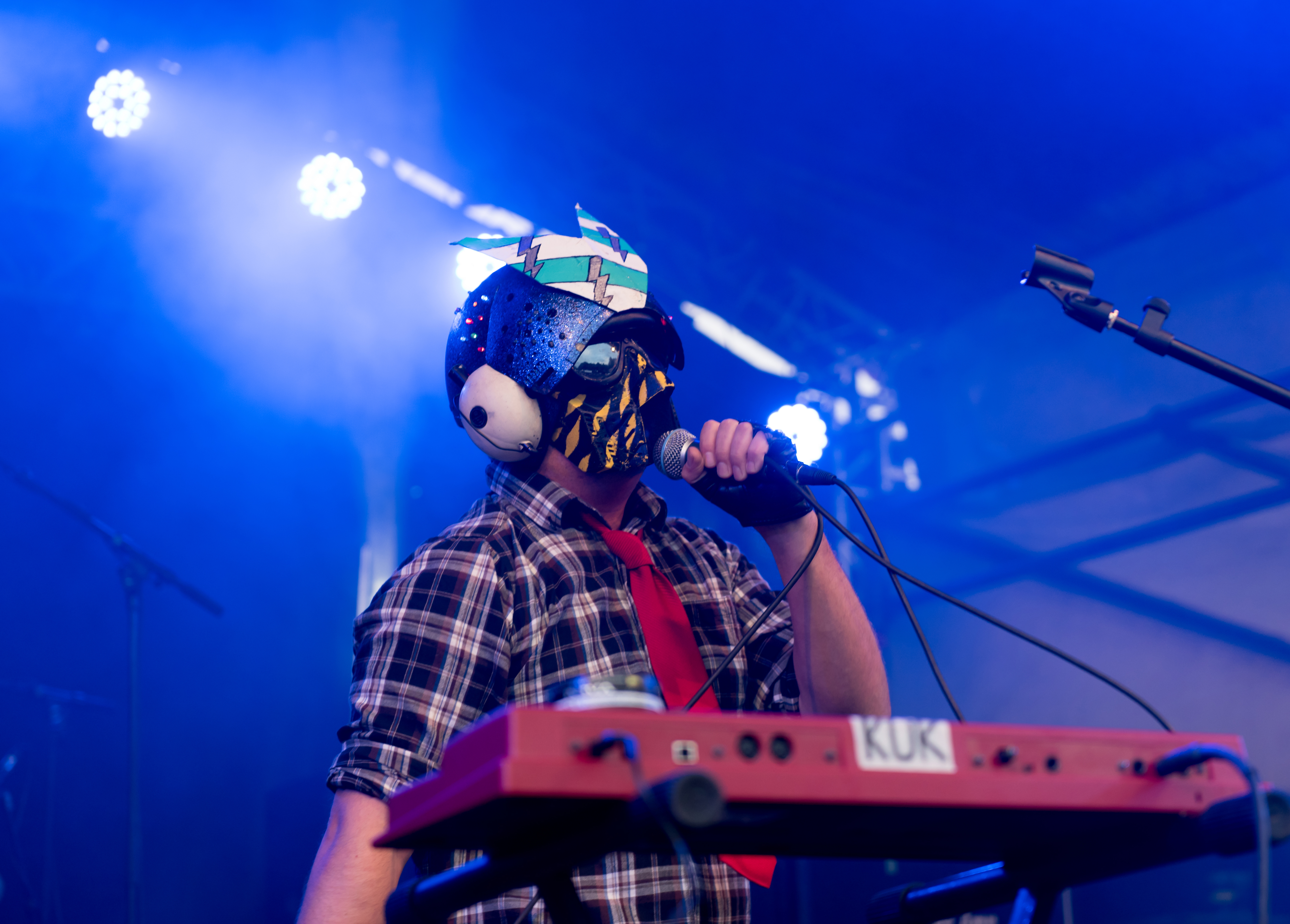
Elvis Creep.

All lyrics are written by Elvis Creep. Many songs deal with his personal life ("Forget the Image I Got a Heart", "Morphine") and with trivial matters ("He-Man", "nv4.dll"). Occasionally, however, political topics are also addressed ("Gay Wedding", "Twenty Twelve"), although the band says it prefers to keep music and politics separate. The lyrics are often very short. There are also numerous instrumental compositions ("I Eat Children", "I'm to Her What She Used to Be to Me", "Aachen", "Essen").

== Discography ==
The band is released on the Audiolith label.

=== Studio albums ===
Title	Release date
What You Didn't Know When You Hired Me (CD, Vinyl)	7 February 2006
Cheap Italian Wine (Digipack)	8 May 2009
Bondage Fairies (CD, Vinyl)	20 January 2012
Alfa Gaga Cp Wifi	21 July 2017

=== EPs and singles ===
Title	Release date
He-Man (Vinyl 7")	2005
Garbage Indiebands (Vinyl 7")	2008
1-0 (digital release only)	8 April 2011
Fantasy Outfit (single)	23 December 2011
Satan You And Me (single)	27 September 2013
Head On	18 October 2013
