= Show Me Your Love (album) =

Studio album by Tina Karol
- Released: 16 May 2006
- Length: 43:22
- Label: Lavina Music
- Producer: Mikhail Nekrasov

Tina Karol chronology
Show Me Your Love (2006)	Nochey (2007)

Show Me Your Love is the debut studio album by Ukrainian singer Tina Karol. The album was released on 16 May 2006, by Lavina Music.

The album features thirteen tracks, including a Ukrainian-language version of the Christmas carol "Silent Night" and two remixes of the title track "Show Me Your Love."

== Release and promotion ==
In 2005, Karol released the album's lead single "Vyshe oblakov" (Ukrainian: Выше облаков), which was written Karol herself and Mikhail Nekrasov. The video for the song was directed by Herman Hlinskyi. The money that Karol received at the New Wave competition was used to shoot her first music video.

Karol had won Ty – Zirka! with the song "I Am Your Queen", enabling her to compete in the Eurovision Song Contest 2006. "I Am Your Queen" was retitled and revamped as "Show Me Your Love" for the Eurovision Song Contest, featuring new arrangement and lyrics. The official music video of the song, directed by Herman Hlynsky and filmed in Kyiv at the Kayf restaurant and the Pomada Club, was released on 30 March. With the album's title track, "Show Me Your Love," Tina Karol performed at the Eurovision Song Contest in Greece and finished in seventh place. "Show Me Your Love" would be released the album's second and finals single on 16 May 2006 alongside its namesake album.

== Track listing ==
No.	Title	Length
1.	"Money Doesn't Metter"	3:55
2.	"Russian Boy"	3:14
3.	"Life Is Not Enough"	3:21
4.	"Honey"	3:02
5.	"Love Of My Life"	3:09
6.	"Show Me Your Love"	2:57
7.	"Silent Night" (Ukrainian version)	2:11
8.	"Honey" (fiesta edit)	3:21
9.	"Money Doesn't Matter" (remake)	3:17
10.	"Show Me Your Love" (REMIX radio edit)	3:35
11.	"Show Me Your Love" (REMIX club edit)	5:19
12.	"Выше облаков" (bonus)	3:04
13.	"Выше облаков (video)" (bonus)	3:04
Total length:		43:22
