= The Hardkiss =

Ukrainian rock band

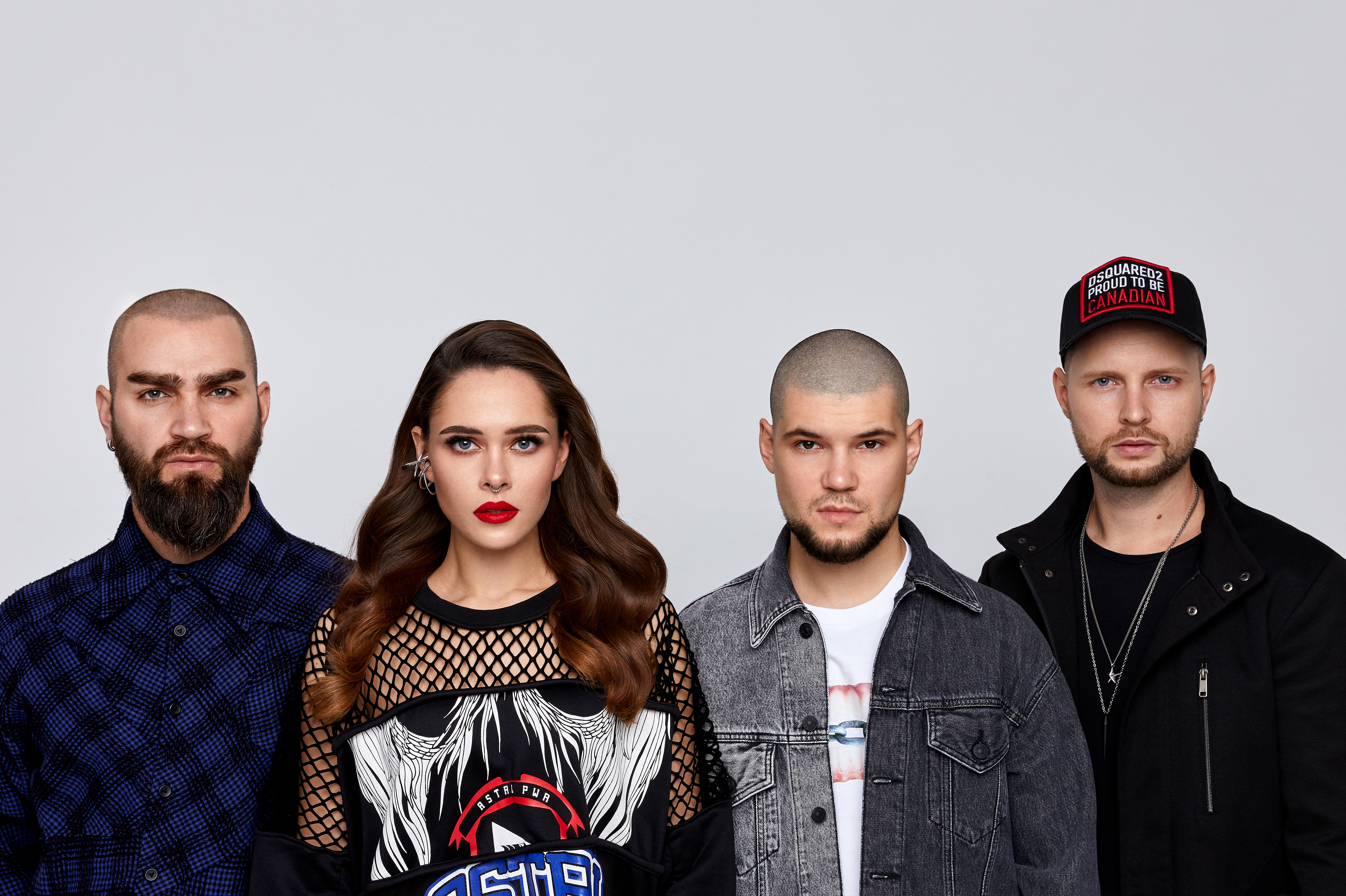
- L–R: Bebko, Sanina, Lysiuk, Kibeliev (2019)

Background information
- Origin: Kyiv, Ukraine
- Genres: Rock; pop; electronic
- Years active: 2011–present
- Labels: Firework; Comp
- Members: Julia Sanina; Valeriy Bebko; Klym Lysiuk; Yevhen Kibeliev
- Past members: Max Ponomarchuk; Kreechy; Pol Solonar; Vitaliy Oniskevych; Roman Skorobahatko; Dmytro Smotrov
- Website: thehardkiss.com

The Hardkiss (stylised as The HARDKISS) is a Ukrainian rock band (performing in Ukrainian and English) formed in 2011 by singer Julia Sanina and guitarist Valeriy "Val" Bebko. Other members include bassist Klym Lysiuk and drummer Yevhen Kibeliev. They are winners of multiple YUNA awards. In 2016, the band participated in the Ukrainian national selection for the Eurovision Song Contest, finishing in second place.

To date, the band has released five studio albums, one EP, one live record, and numerous singles.

== History ==
=== Formation ===
At the age of 18, Julia Sanina interviewed the MTV Ukraine broadcast producer Valeriy Bebko for an article she was writing as an aspiring student journalist. The two became friends (and later married) and began to write music together as Val & Sanina, with Sanina as the vocalist and Bebko playing bass; they released a music video and a number of songs in Russian. They later met the sound engineer Max and producers Volodymyr Syvokon and Stas Tiunov of the Firework Sound record label, who suggested that they sing in English instead and build up an audience in the West. The band sought a new name and asked their friends for feedback on several potential options, including "Planet Pony", "Model 8", and "the Hardkiss". After listening to a demo of the band's music, their friends noted that it contained elements that were "hard", but also sweet and tender, like a kiss.

=== 2011–2014: First singles and shows ===
In September 2011, the Hardkiss released their first video, "Babylon", while their lineup had expanded to include Max Ponomarchuk and a masked drummer, Kreechy, whose role was occasionally taken on by Sanina's father, Oleksandr Holovan. In its first year, the band opened for the English synth-pop duo Hurts and for American singer Solange Knowles in Kyiv.

In December 2011, the band released a music video for "Dance with Me", directed by Bebko, with Yurii Korol as the camera operator. It appeared on MTV Russia and Muz-TV, before airing globally on MTV. The online magazine DosugUA ranked the video second on its list of the most stylish music videos of 2011.

The Hardkiss performed at MIDEM festival in 2012. By March, the band had been signed to Sony BMG. The same year, the band was nominated for the MTV Europe Music Award for Best Ukrainian Act. By the time of the nomination, Pol Solonar had joined the band as a keyboards player, while Ponomarchuk was no longer listed as a member.

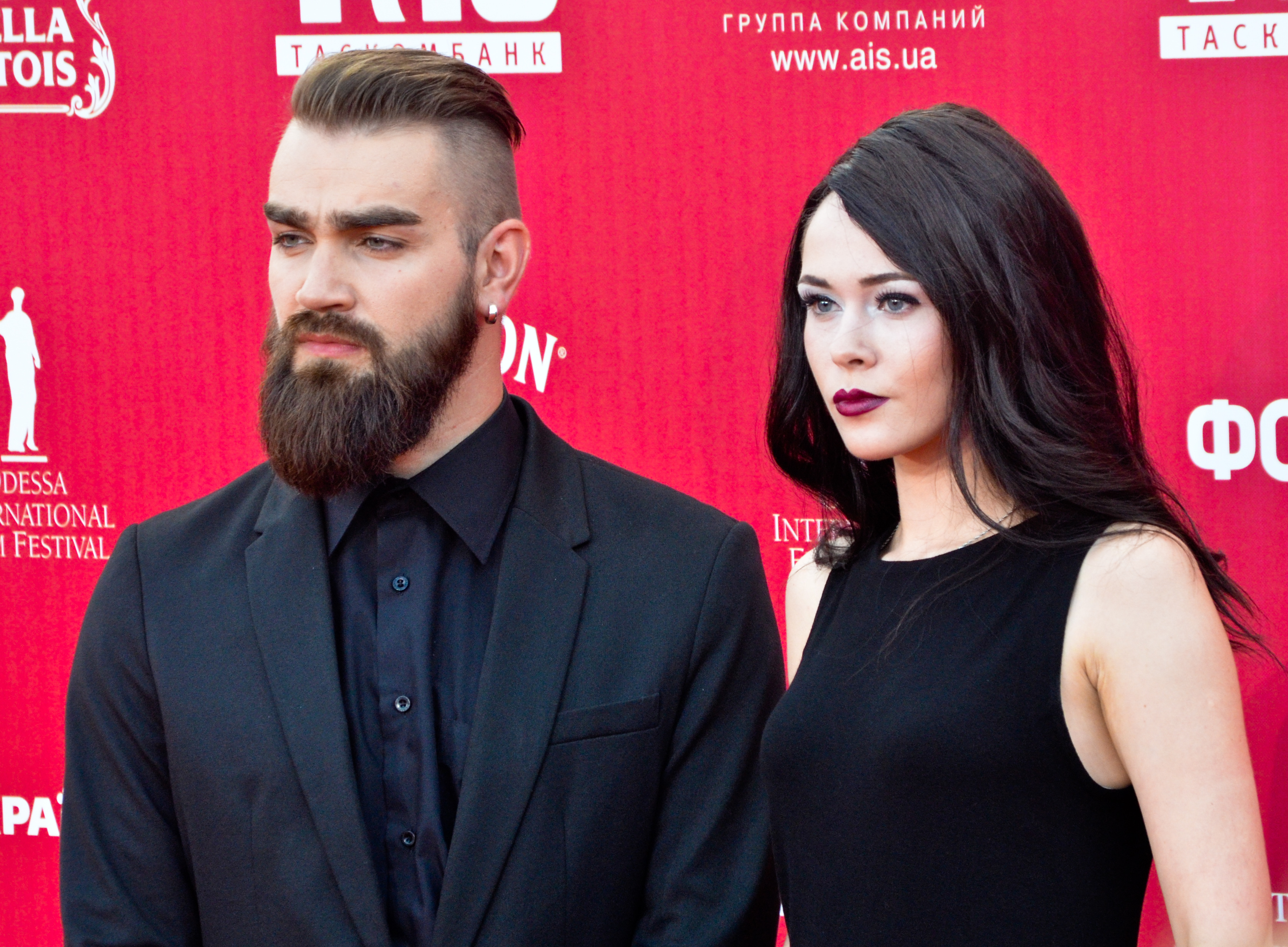
Val Bebko and Julia Sanina at the 5th Odesa International Film Festival, in 2014

In 2013, the Hardkiss won two awards at the Ukrainian national music award, YUNA—one for Best New Act and the other for Best Music Video for "Make Up", which was awarded to Bebko. The band played their first solo live performance that year in Kyiv, with all tickets sold out one week in advance. They also opened the Muz-TV Music Awards in Moscow, became the "voice and face" of Pepsi in Ukraine, and headlined the Pepsi Stars of Now tour, covering sixteen Ukrainian cities.

=== 2014–present ===
In 2014, the Hardkiss presented its first album, Stones and Honey, which contained more than ten previously released songs as well as the band's first song in Ukrainian, "Прірва", written in response to the loss of people in Kyiv and human conflict during Euromaidan. The record was named Best Music Album at the 2015 YUNA award ceremony, where the track "Stones" also won the award for Best Song.

The band's first album was followed by an EP titled Cold Altair, which included the previously known "Tony, Talk!" and "Organ", the new songs "Altair", "Doctor Thomases", and "Hammer", an acoustic version of "Shadows of Time", renamed to "Shadows of Light", as well as two remixes of "Tony, Talk!" The EP cover art was created by the artist Denys Tsiperko, who has developed characters for Marvel and Riot Games. Sanina said that the record was heavier and "more alternative" than the band's previous work.

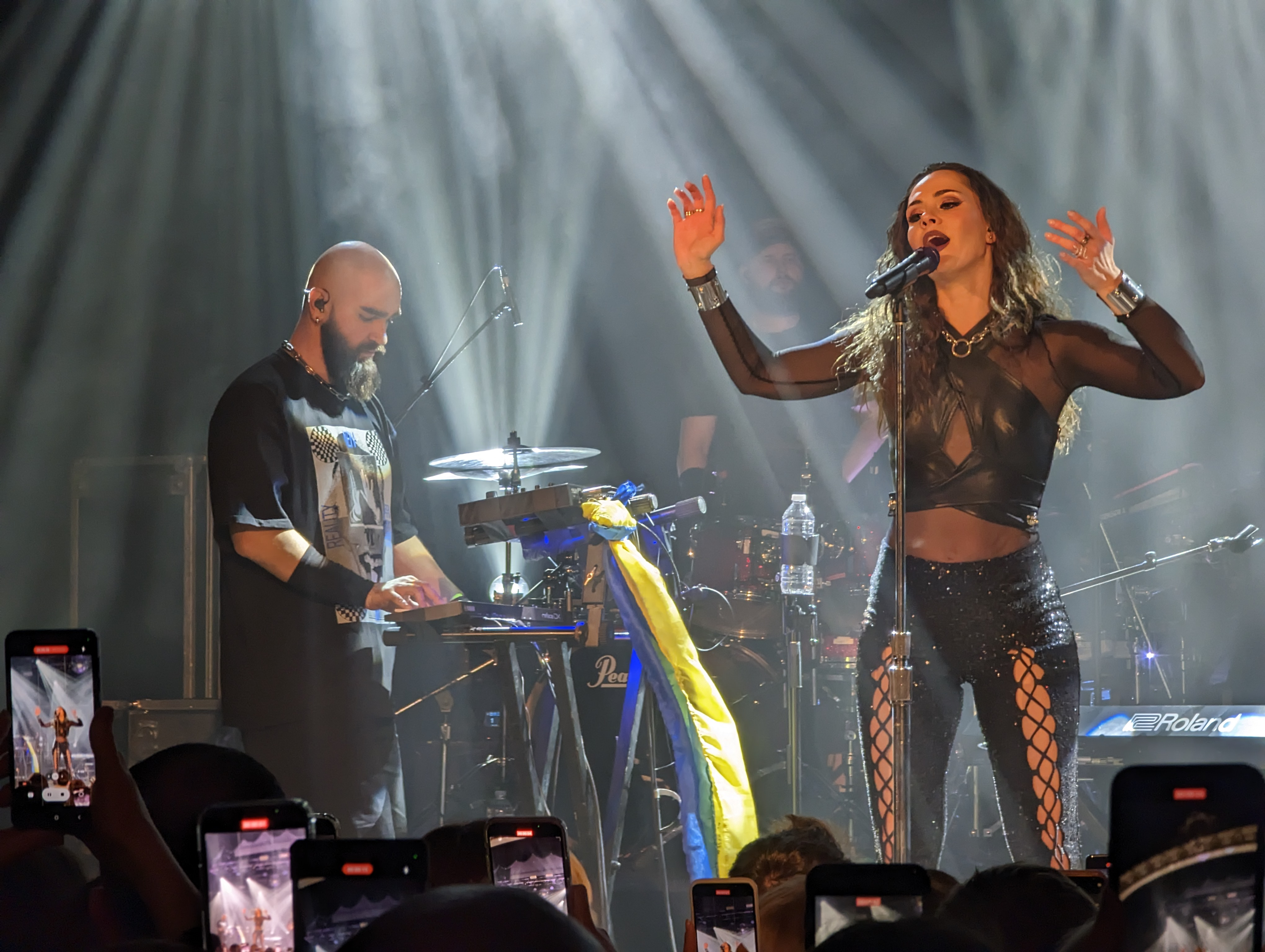
The Hardkiss performing at The Opera House in Toronto, Canada, in 2023

The Hardkiss participated in the Ukrainian national selection for the Eurovision Song Contest 2016 with the song "Helpless", placing second in the final. Klym Lysiuk, who had attempted to join the band for four years and recorded bass covers of their songs, became their bassist the same year.

In 2018, the band won two awards at YUNA: Best Rock Band and Best Song in Ukrainian, for "Zhuravli". Later that year, guitarist Roman Skorobahatko left but was set to continue performing with the Hardkiss as a live session musician. Later in 2018, the band released its third album, Zalizna Lastivka.

In November 2019, the band's drummer, Kreechy, revealed his idendity as Dmytro Smotrov and announced his departure after five years with the group. He was replaced by Yevhen Kibeliev of SKAI.

The Hardkiss was slated to perform a ten-year anniversary show at the Olympic Stadium in Kyiv in 2021, but this was cancelled after a series of delays related to the COVID-19 pandemic and the full-scale Russian invasion of Ukraine in 2022. In the aftermath of the invasion, the Hardkiss released the song "Як ти?", together with a music video, whose proceeds were to be donated to humanitarian aid. The war generated increased international interest in Ukrainian music, including the Hardkiss, who then embarked on charity tours in support of the Armed Forces of Ukraine and Ukrainian children.

In 2025, following extensive touring, the Hardkiss began work on a new album containing songs in English and Ukrainian. The first single, "Crush", came out together with a music video in June, followed by "Tenderness" and "AiAiAi". The same year, the band's manager, Yehor Kirianov, announced the end of their partnership, with each party subsequently accusing the other of unfulfilled financial or work obligations. Grey Hound was released in June 2026. Written by Sanina and Bebko and containing 12 tracks, it was conceived as a concept album built around the subject of time, seen by the band as a healer, and personified by Sanina in a grey suit in the album's music videos. The record includes a collaboration with the English rock band the Hara, titled "I Love You". The songs "Day After Day" and "Stay" are dedicated to Ukrainians who are away from home. "Ursula" and "1000" are sung in Ukrainian, while the rest of the album is in English.

== Band members ==
Current

- Julia Sanina – vocals (2011–present)
- Valeriy "Val" Bebko – guitar (2011–present)
- Klym Lysiuk – bass (2016–present)
- Yevhen Kibeliev – drums (2019–present)

Past

- Kreechy – drums (2011–?)
- Max Ponomarchuk – keyboards (2011–2012)
- Pol Solonar – keyboards (2012–2013)
- Vitaliy Oniskevych – keyboards (2013–2016)
- Roman Skorobahatko – guitar (2013–2018)
- Dmytro Smotrov (as Kreechy) – drums (2014–2019)

== Discography ==
Studio albums

- Stones and Honey (2014)
- Perfection Is a Lie (2017)
- Залізна ластівка (2018)
- Жива і не залізна (2021)
- Grey Hound (2026)

EPs

- Cold Altair (2015)

Live albums

- Акустика. Live (2020)

Singles

- "Babylon" (2011)
- "Dance with Me" (2011)
- "Make-Up" (2012)
- "October" (2012)
- "Part of Me" (2013)
- "In Love" (2013)
- "Under the Sun" (2013)
- "Shadows of Time" (2013)
- "Tell Me Brother" (2013)
- "Hurricane" (2014)
- "Stones" (2014)
- "Strange Moves" feat. Kazaky (2014)
- "PiBiP" (2015)
- "Organ" (2015)
- "Tony, Talk!" (2015)
- "Helpless" (2016)
- "Perfection!" (2016)
- "Rain" (2016)
- "Closer" (2016)
- "Антарктида" (2017)
- "Журавлі (Cranes)" (2017)
- "Lovers" (2017)
- "Кораблі" (2017)
- "Мелодія" (2018)
- "Free Me" (2018)
- "Коханці" (2018)
- "Серце" (2019)
- "Хто, як не ти?" (2019)
- "Жива" (2019)
- "Косатка" (2020)
- "Гора" (2020)
- "Кобра" feat. MONATIK (2020)
- "Все було так" (2020)
- "Обійми" (2021)
- "7 вітрів" (2021)
- "Сестра" (2021)
- "Як ти?" (2022)
- "Маяк" (2022)
- "Два вікна" (2023)
- "Festival" (2023)
- "Мрійники" feat. Tvorchi (2023)
- "Тільки там" (2024)
- "Crush" (2025)
- "Tenderness" (2025)
- "АiAiAi" (2025)
