= Movement (band) =

Australian musical duo

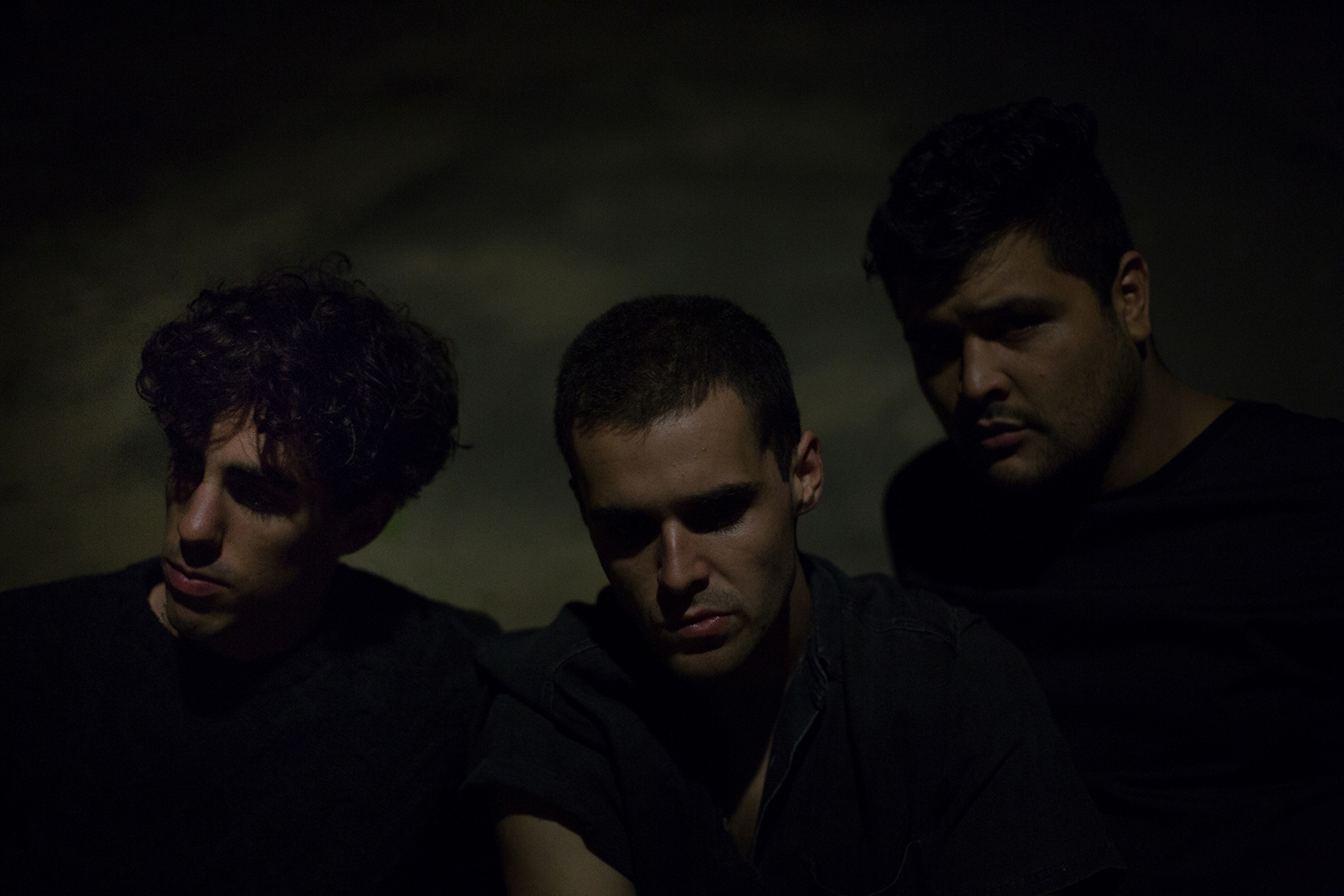
- Movement in 2015

Background information
- Origin: Sydney, Australia
- Genres: R&B; soul; electronic; ambient
- Years active: 2011–present
- Labels: Modular; Universal
- Members: Jesse James Ward; Lewis Wade
- Past members: Sean Walker

Movement (stylised as MOVEMENT) are an Australian minimal soul duo who blend R&B and ambient music. They consist of Lewis Wade on vocals and keyboards and Jesse James Ward on bass guitar, synthesisers, and vocals. Their self-titled debut EP was released in May 2014 via Modular Recordings.

== History ==
Movement were formed in Sydney in 2011. Their music is described as "minimal soul," as well as "psychedelic" and "body music." The songs have elements of R&B, ambient, soul and pop music.

They were signed to Modular Recordings in May 2013 ahead of the label issuing their debut single, "Feel Real". Their second single, "Us", was named a Best New Track on Pitchfork in September, as was the third single, "Like Lust", in March 2014. That single reached No. 16 on the ARIA Hitseekers Singles Chart. The music video for a fourth single, "Ivory" (April), was directed by Fleur & Manu.

Movement's debut, self-titled, four-track EP was released on 6 May 2014 via Modular Recordings, with additional production and mixing from Illangelo. Ryan Burleson of Paste described how, "[their] songs interact with the body more than the mind, though in the right settings—driving in the desert at sunset, say, or getting high at night on the beach—they're ripe for meditation. Otherwise the goal here seems fairly obvious: To generate a soundtrack for the bedroom, the moments leading up to the bedroom, and the moments just beyond... the trio hits all its marks, and listeners would border on robotic not to feel at least a slight bit of provocation in these songs."

Movement toured Australia in May 2014 and then Europe and the United States in mid-year. They have opened for various artists including Banks on her North American tour in August 2014, Darkside on their tour of Australia, and for Solange. According to AllMusic's Paul Simpson, "[their] sound combined seductive, R&B-inspired vocals with downtempo dance beats and dark atmospheres."

MTV's Lisa Hamilton caught their gig in September 2014 at Newtown Social Club, "These are bedroom tracks for Millenials; between the sheets of a digital age where lust is clicked, licked and fleeting... The pulses beat the tempo of a new hook up; the Movement sounds takes strokes of James Blake-esque tones and melds them with dance tracks that whisper of chaste sensuality. The timbre of vocalist Lewis Wade’s whiskey-honey vocals grated over the synth so sensually in 'Us' and teased us into 'coming over when it feels like lust'."

They performed at the 2014 Pitchfork Music Festival Paris in November and the 2015 Primavera Festival in Spain in May.

== Band members ==
Current

- Jesse James Ward – bass guitar, synthesisers, vocals (2011–present)
- Lewis Wade – vocals, keyboards (2012–present)

Past

- Sean Walker

== Discography ==
EPs

Year	Title
2014	Movement: Released: 6 May 2014; Label: Modular Recordings / Universal Music Australia; Formats: LP, digital download

Singles

- "Feel Real" (2012)
- "Us" (2013)
- "Like Lust" (2014) – AUS Hitseekers: No. 16
- "Ivory" (2014)
