= Julia Sanina =

Ukrainian singer (born 1990)

Julia Sanina Юлія Саніна
- Sanina in 2019

Background information
- Born: Yuliia Oleksandrivna Holovan; 11 October 1990 (age 35); Kyiv, Ukrainian SSR, Soviet Union (now Ukraine)
- Genres: Rock
- Occupations: Singer; songwriter
- Years active: 2011–present
- Member of: The Hardkiss
- Spouse: Valeriy "Val" Bebko (m. 2011)

Yuliia Oleksandrivna Bebko (Ukrainian: Юлія Олександрівна Бебко; née Holovan [Головань]; born 11 October 1990), professionally known as Julia Sanina (Ukrainian: Юлія Саніна, romanized: Yuliia Sanina [ˈjul⁽ʲ⁾ijɐ ˈsɑn⁽ʲ⁾inɐ]), is a Ukrainian singer and the frontwoman of the rock band The Hardkiss.

== Biography ==
Sanina was born into a family of musicians on 11 October 1990 in Kyiv, Ukrainian SSR, Soviet Union. She performed on the stage for the first time when she was three years old; her singing was then accompanied by an ensemble that her father directed. Eventually she started to perform as a solo vocalist, as well as one of the members of children's groups and a jazz big band.

In 2005, she graduated from the Music School of Jazz and Variety art. She later entered the Institute of Philology of Taras Shevchenko National University of Kyiv and obtained her master's degree in folklore studies in 2013. While studying in college she also grew her interest in journalism.

From 2006 to 2008, she was a vocalist in the band Sister Siren.

In September 2011, Sanina and music producer Valeriy Bebko created the pop duo Val & Sanina, which performed songs in Russian. They recorded an experimental music video and a few songs, one of them The love has come (Russian: Любовь настала; lyrics: Robert Rozhdestvensky, music: Raimonds Pauls).

Shortly after, they improved their stage image and changed their band's name to The Hardkiss. They also started to write songs in English all by themselves and made their sound heavier. In autumn 2011, they released a few new songs and recorded their debut music video titled Babylon. At the end of October 2011, The Hardkiss was opening for the British band Hurts. Later that year, they released Dance with me, a music video that aired on the leading music channels.

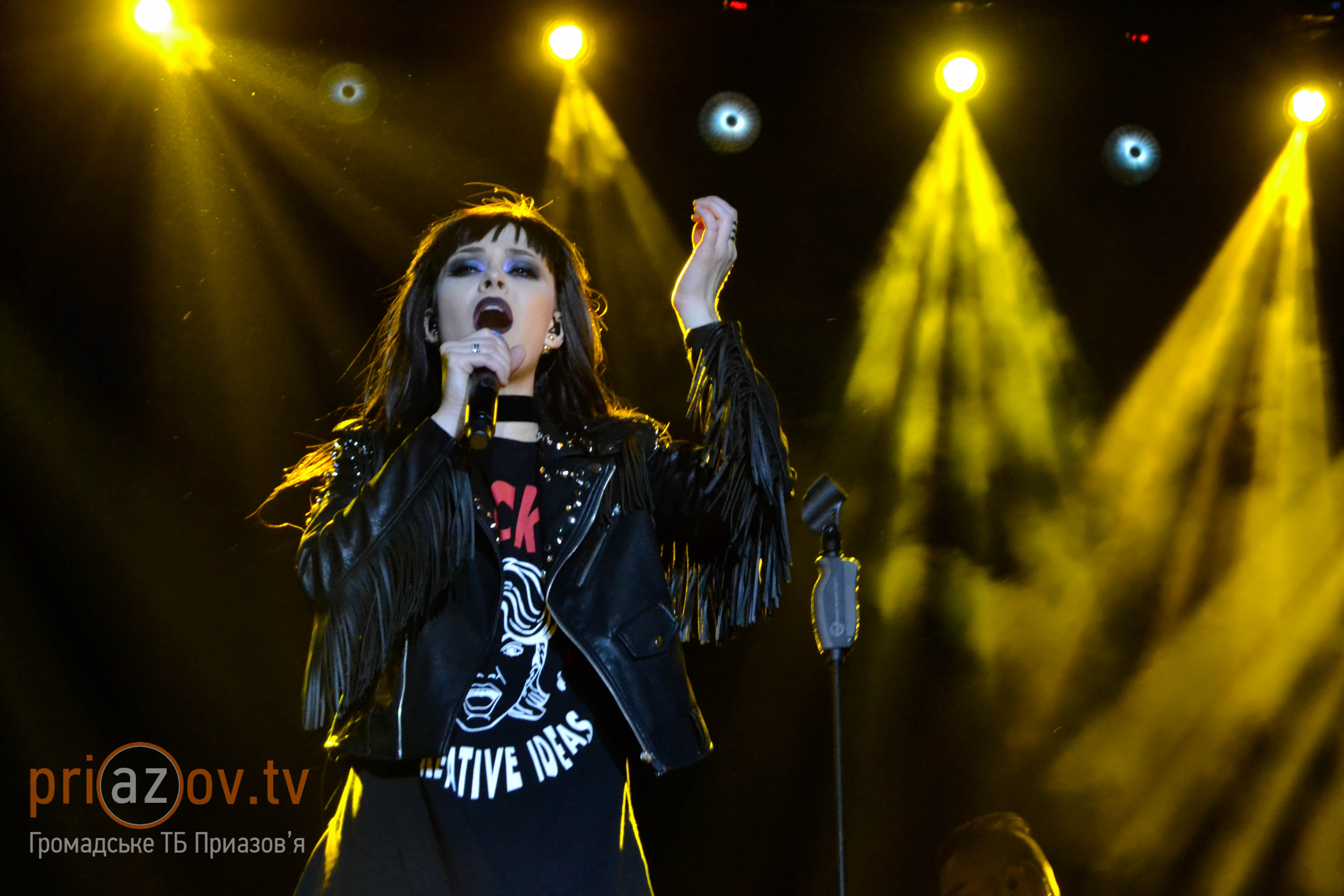
The Hardkiss at the MRPL City 2017 fest in Mariupol

In February 2012, they signed a contract with label Sony BMG. The band rapidly started to gain popularity and won several awards in Ukraine, as well as in other foreign countries. In 2014, Sanina started to upload video blogs about her life and the band's life behind the scenes on her YouTube channel. In 2016, Sanina became one of four judges on the seventh series of The X Factor Ukraine.

Sanina co-hosted the Eurovision Song Contest 2023 in Liverpool alongside Alesha Dixon and Hannah Waddingham with Graham Norton joining them for the final.

In 2023, it was announced that Sanina would be a coach on the thirteenth season of The Voice of the Country beginning in September 2023.

In 2024, Sanina voiced the character Agatha in the Ukrainian localization of the video game S.T.A.L.K.E.R. 2: Heart of Chornobyl.

=== Personal life ===
Sanina married Valeriy "Val" Bebko, a creative producer and lead guitarist of The Hardkiss, in 2011 in a traditional Ukrainian-style wedding. The couple had met in 2008 or 2009 when Sanina had interviewed Bebko, who was the producer of MTV Ukraine at the time, but kept their relationship hidden until 2014. The couple's first child, Danylo, was born on 21 November 2015.

Preceded by (Italy) Alessandro Cattelan, Laura Pausini and Mika	Eurovision Song Contest presenter 2023; With: Alesha Dixon, Hannah Waddingham and Graham Norton (final)	Succeeded by (Sweden) Petra Mede and Malin Åkerman
