= The Masked Singer Ukraine =

Ukrainian singing competition TV show

- Promotional poster
- Маска
- Genre: Music competition
- Based on: King of Mask Singer by Munhwa Broadcasting Corporation
- Presented by: Volodymyr Ostapchuk
- Starring: Andriy Danylko; Olya Polyakova; Dzidzio; NK; Oleh Vynnyk
- Country of origin: Ukraine
- Original language: Ukrainian
- No. of seasons: 2
- No. of episodes: 22 (+1 special)

Original release
- Network: Ukraina
- Release: January 16 – December 25, 2021

Related
- Masked Singer franchise

The Masked Singer Ukraine (Ukrainian: Маска; lit. Mask) is a Ukrainian reality singing competition television series based on the Masked Singer franchise which originated from the South Korean version of the show King of Mask Singer. It premiered on Ukraina TV channel on 16 January 2021.

== Cast ==
=== Panelists and host ===
Current series panellists

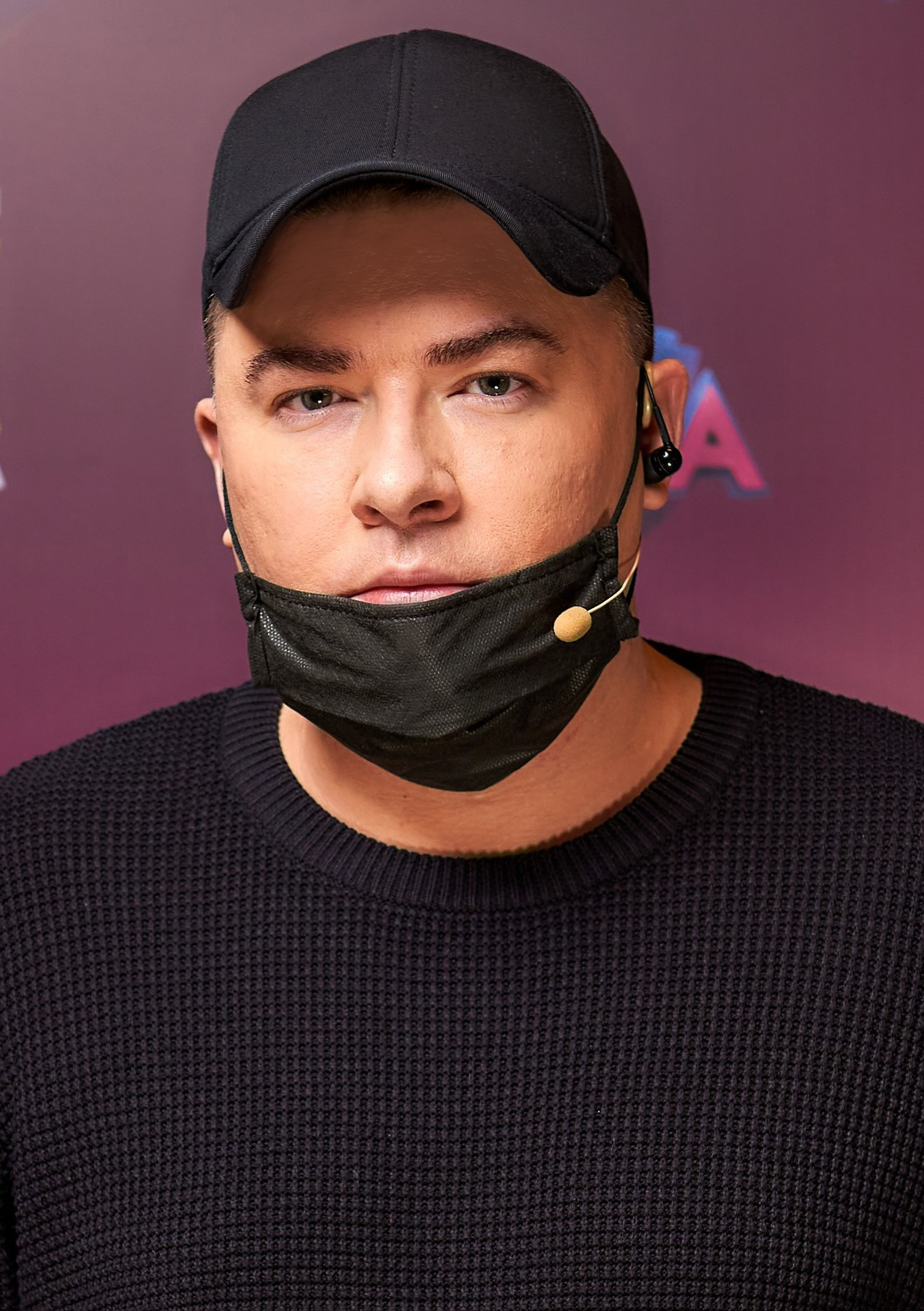
Andriy Danylko

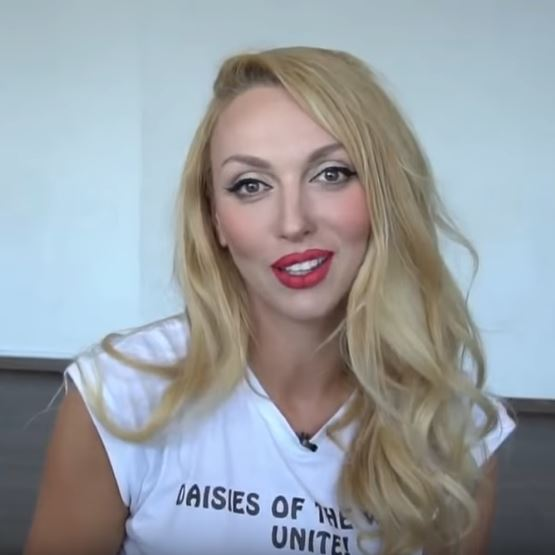
Olya Polyakova

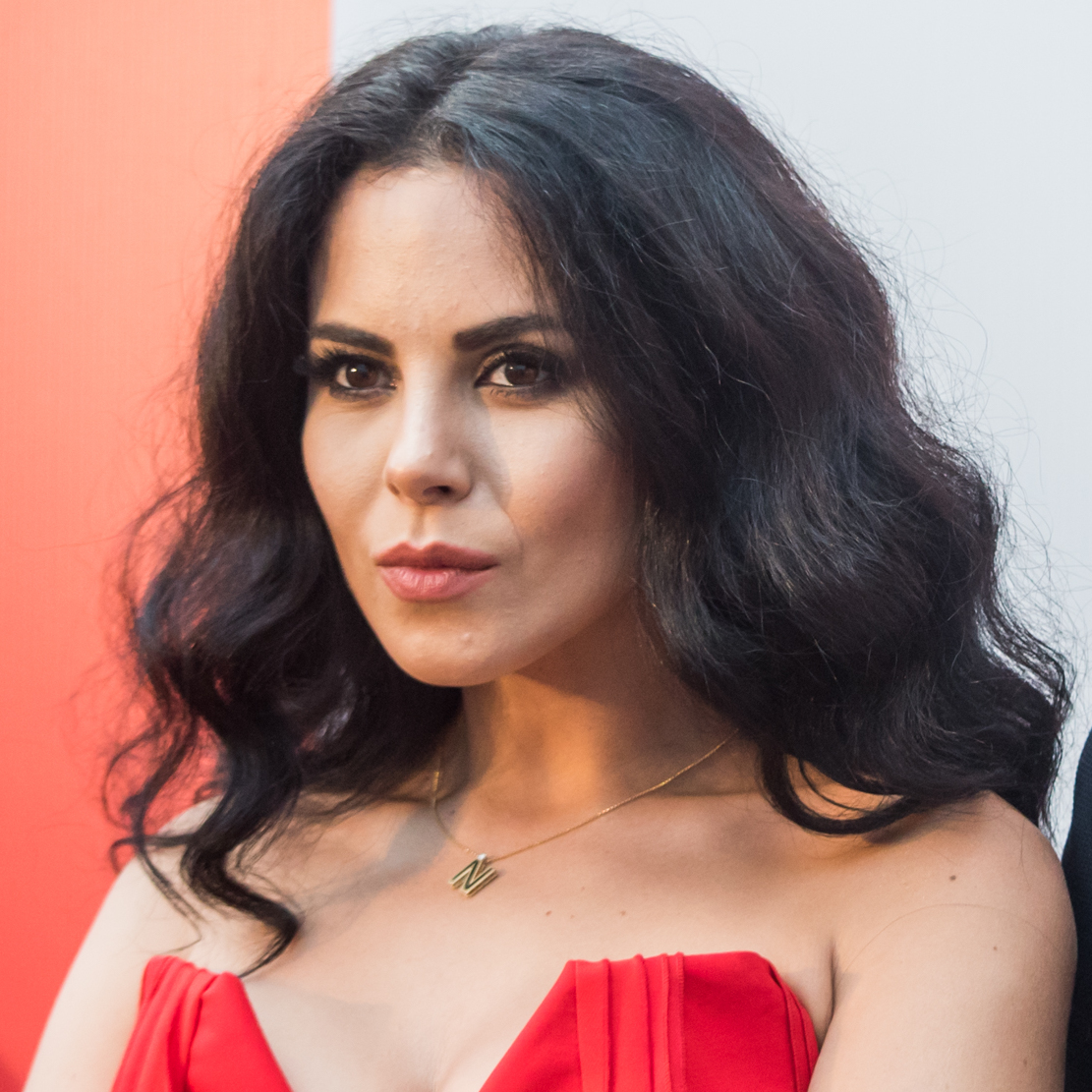
NK

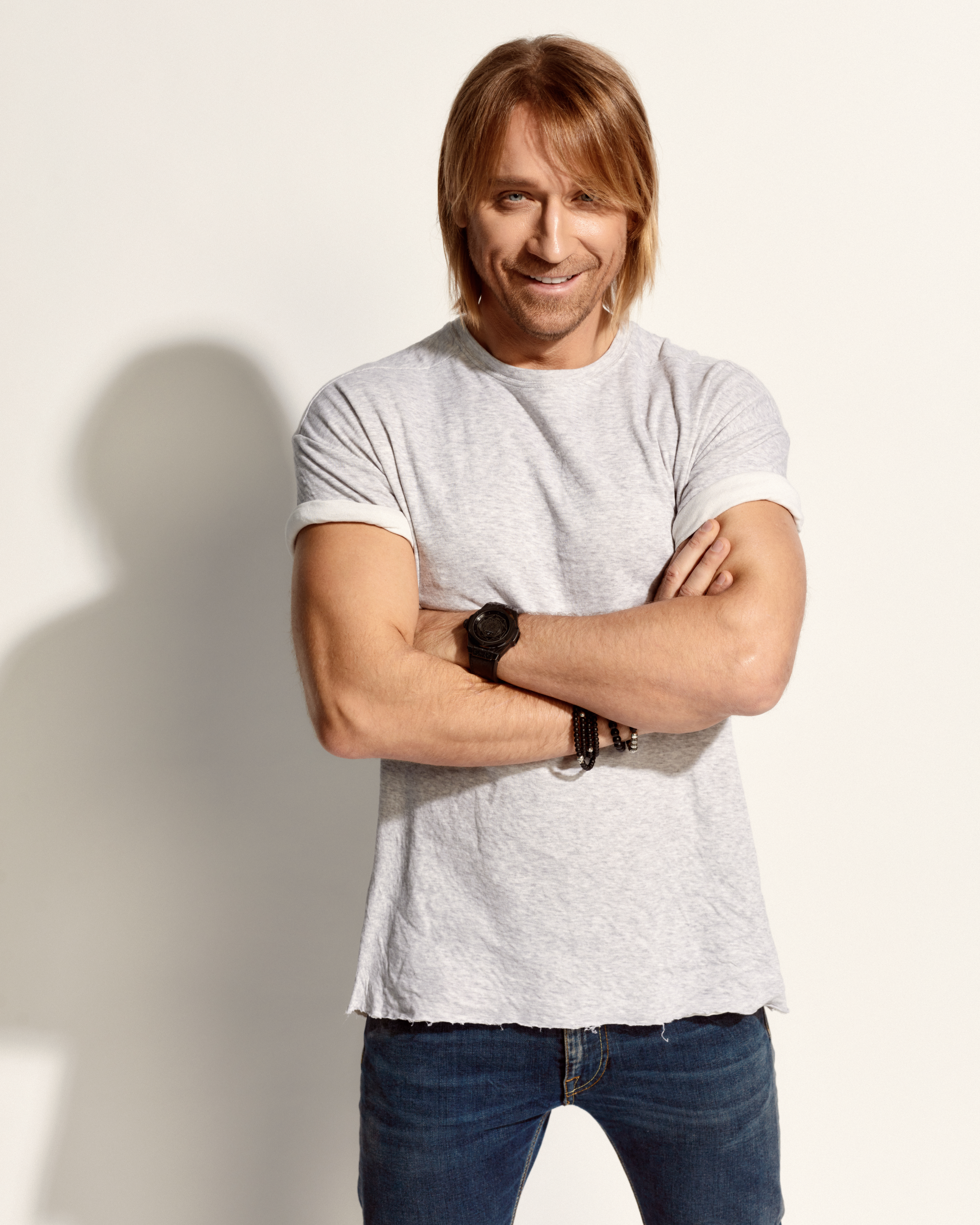
Oleh Vynnyk

Following the announcement of the series, it was confirmed by Ukraina that a television presenter and stand-up comedian Volodymyr Ostapchuk would serve as the show's host.
On 29 December 2020, the permanent panel of celebrity detectives was announced, which is composed of singers Andriy Danylko, Olya Polyakova, Dzidzio and NK. In the second episode they were joined by a singer Oleh Vynnyk, who self-eliminated himself under the guise of Buffalo.

== Series overview ==
Series	Contestants	Episodes	Originally released		Winner	Runner-up	Third place
Series	Contestants	Episodes	First released	Last released	Winner	Runner-up	Third place
1	16	12	16 January 2021	10 April 2021	Zlata Ognevich as "Sun"	Arsen Mirzoyan as "Dragon"	Oleksii Trytenko as "Rhino"
2	14	10	23 September 2021	25 December 2021	Melovin as "Giraffe"	Olha Cybulska as "Scandal"	Oleg Kenzov as "Fly Agaric"

== Season 1 ==
=== Contestants ===
Stage name	Celebrity	Occupation	Episodes											
Stage name	Celebrity	Occupation	1	2	3	4	5	6	7	8	9	10	11	12
Sun	Zlata Ognevich	Singer	SAFE		SAFE		RISK		SAFE		SAFE	SAFE	WIN	WINNER
Dragon	Arsen Mirzoyan	Singer	SAFE		SAFE		SAFE		RISK		SAFE	SAFE	WIN	RUNNER-UP
Rhino	Oleksii Trytenko	Actor		SAFE		RISK		RISK		SAFE	SAFE	SAFE	WIN	THIRD
Cyclops	Michelle Andrade	Singer		SAFE		SAFE		SAFE		SAFE	SAFE	SAFE	OUT	
Dragonfly	Anastasiya Prikhodko	Singer		SAFE		SAFE		SAFE		SAFE	SAFE	SAFE	OUT	
Frog	Yevhen Smorygin	Comedian	SAFE		SAFE		SAFE		SAFE		SAFE	RISK	OUT	
Catfish	Irakli Makatsaria	Actor	SAFE		SAFE		SAFE		SAFE		RISK	OUT		
Beet	Dmytro Kadnay	Singer		SAFE		SAFE		SAFE		RISK	OUT			
Molfar	Pavlo Kostitsyn	TV Presenter		RISK		SAFE		SAFE		OUT				
Rose	Alina Grosu	Singer	RISK		RISK		SAFE		OUT					
Lion	Oleksandr Ponomariov	Singer		SAFE		SAFE		OUT						
Goat	Natalia Kholodenko	TV Presenter	RISK		SAFE		OUT							
Peahen	Iryna Fedyshyn	Singer		SAFE		OUT								
Fox	Olena Shoptenko	Dancer	SAFE		OUT									
Krapanka	Oksana Bayrak	Film Director		OUT										
Buffalo	Oleh Vynnyk	Singer	WD (Note: Withdew from the competition and became a fifth panelist.)											

The masked singer won their face-off and remained in the competition.
The masked singer was safe from elimination.
The masked singer lost their face-off and was in the bottom three/two, but was not eliminated.
The masked singer was eliminated from the competition and unmasked upon their elimination.
The masked singer did not perform.
The masked singer self-eliminated from the competition.

=== Guest appearances ===
Stage Namename	Celebrity	Occupation	Episodes											
Stage Namename	Celebrity	Occupation	1	2	3	4	5	6	7	8	9	10	11	12
Swallowtail	Natalia Mohylevska	Singer												
Wolf	Max Barskih	Singer												
Raven	Zlata Ognevich	Singer												
Moon	Nadia Meiher	Singer												
Mojito	Oleksii Sukhanov	TV Presenter												
Crayfish	Iryna Bilyk	Singer												
Chimera	Volodymyr Ostapchuk	TV Presenter												

== Episodes ==
=== Week 1 (16 January) ===
Performances on the first episode
#	Stage name	Song	Identity	Result
1	Dragon	"Ты меня любишь" by Aleksander Serov	undisclosed	SAFE
2	Goat	"Дівчина весна" by Natalia Buchynska	undisclosed	RISK
3	Fox	"Hollaback Girl" by Gwen Stefani	undisclosed	SAFE
4	Frog	"I Will Always Love You" by Whitney Houston	undisclosed	SAFE
5	Buffalo	"Тримай" by Khrystyna Soloviy	Oleh Vynnyk	WD
6	Rose	"Бриллианты" by Nu Virgos	undisclosed	RISK
7	Catfish	"Sex Bomb" by Tom Jones & Mousse T.	undisclosed	SAFE
8	Sun	"GoldenEye" by Tina Turner	undisclosed	SAFE

=== Week 2 (30 January) ===
Performances on the second episode
#	Stage name	Song	Identity	Result
1	Beet	"Смерека" by Oleksandr Kvarta	undisclosed	SAFE
2	Dragonfly	"I Wanna Be Loved by You" by Marilyn Monroe	undisclosed	SAFE
3	Krapanka	"Дольчче Габбана" by Verka Serduchka	Oksana Bayrak	OUT
4	Rhino	"Canción del mariachi" by Antonio Banderas	undisclosed	SAFE
5	Molfar	"Так же, как все" by Alla Pugacheva	undisclosed	RISK
6	Cyclops	"Свята" by Kazka	undisclosed	SAFE
7	Peahen	"Jimmy Jimmy Jimmy Aaja" by Parvati Khan and Vijay Benedict	undisclosed	SAFE
8	Lion	"Я люблю тільки тебе" by Oleksandr Ponomariov	undisclosed	SAFE

=== Week 3 (6 February) ===
Performances on the third episode
#	Stage name	Song	Identity	Result
1	Fox	"Dance Monkey" by Tones and I	Olena Shoptenko	OUT
2	Sun	"Чортополох" by Taisia Povaliy	undisclosed	SAFE
3	Goat	"Malambo No. 1" by Yma Sumac	undisclosed	SAFE
4	Dragon	"Пьяное солнце" by Alekseev	undisclosed	SAFE
5	Rose	"SuperSTAR" by LOBODA	undisclosed	RISK
6	Frog	"My Way" by Frank Sinatra	undisclosed	SAFE
7	Catfish	"Personal Jesus" by Depeche Mode	undisclosed	SAFE

=== Week 4 (13 February) ===
Performances on the fourth episode
#	Stage name	Song	Identity	Result
1	Beet	"Uptown Funk" by Mark Ronson feat. Bruno Mars	undisclosed	SAFE
2	Molfar	"Нино" by Oleh Vynnyk	undisclosed	SAFE
3	Peahen	"Bamboléo" by Gipsy Kings	Iryna Fedyshyn	OUT
4	Lion	"Небеса" by Valery Meladze	undisclosed	SAFE
5	Cyclops	"Плачу на техно" by Cream Soda & HLEB	undisclosed	SAFE
6	Dragonfly	"Human" by Rag'n'Bone Man	undisclosed	SAFE
7	Rhino	"Остров невезения" by Andrei Mironov	undisclosed	RISK

=== Week 5 (20 February) ===
Performances on the fifth episode
#	Stage name	Song	Identity	Result
1	Sun	"Single Ladies (Put a Ring on It)" by Beyoncé	undisclosed	RISK
2	Rose	"Белые розы" by Laskovyi Mai	undisclosed	SAFE
3	Frog	"Skibidi" by Little Big	undisclosed	SAFE
4	Goat	"Коломийка" by Ruslana	Natalia Kholodenko	OUT
5	Dragon	"In the Shadows" by The Rasmus	undisclosed	SAFE
6	Catfish	"Зацепила" by Artur Pirozhkov	undisclosed	SAFE

=== Week 6 (27 February) ===
Performances on the sixth episode
#	Stage name	Song	Identity	Result
1	Lion	"The Final Countdown" by Europe	Oleksandr Ponomariov	OUT
2	Cyclops	"Попа как у Ким" by NK	undisclosed	SAFE
3	Beet	"El Tango de Roxanne" from Moulin Rouge!	undisclosed	SAFE
4	Rhino	"Вище неба" by Okean Elzy	undisclosed	RISK
5	Molfar	"Олени" by TIK	undisclosed	SAFE
6	Dragonfly	"Весна" by Vopli Vidopliassova	undisclosed	SAFE

=== Week 7 (6 March) ===
Performances on the seventh episode
#	Stage name	Song	Identity	Result
1	Mahaon	"Нас бьют, мы летаем" by Alla Pugacheva	Natalia Mohylevska	GUEST
2	Frog	"Ля-ля-фа" by Anzhelika Varum	undisclosed	SAFE
3	Rose	"Любимка" by Niletto	Alina Grosu	OUT
4	Catfish	"Я устал" by Quest Pistols Show	undisclosed	SAFE
5	Dragon	"Не дощ" by Tina Karol	undisclosed	RISK
6	Sun	"Стыцамэн" by Ivan Dorn	undisclosed	SAFE

=== Week 8 (13 March) ===
Performances on the eighth episode
#	Stage name	Song	Identity	Result
1	Wolf	"Supermassive Black Hole" by Muse	Max Barskih	GUEST
2	Molfar	"Роман" by NuAngels	Pavlo Kostitsyn	OUT
3	Cyclops	"Despacito" by Luis Fonsi & Daddy Yankee	undisclosed	SAFE
4	Beet	"Полина" by Boombox	undisclosed	RISK
5	Dragonfly	"Снег" by Irina Bilyk	undisclosed	SAFE
6	Rhino	"Я ― то, что надо" by Bravo	undisclosed	SAFE

=== Week 8 (20 March) ===
Performances on the ninth episode
#	Stage name	Song	Identity	Result
1	Raven	"Юра, прости" by NuAngels	Zlata Ognevich	GUEST
2	Dragon	"Подруга-ночь" by Max Barskih	undisclosed	SAFE
3	Cyclops	"Она не твоя" by Grigory Leps & Stas Piekha	undisclosed	SAFE
4	Catfish	"По кайфу" by Oleg Kenzov	undisclosed	RISK
5	Frog	"Белая стрекоза любви" by Quest Pistols Show	undisclosed	SAFE
6	Beet	"Rise Like a Phoenix" by Conchita Wurst	Dmytro Kadnay	OUT
7	Dragonfly	"Lost on You" by LP	undisclosed	SAFE
8	Sun	"Стена" by Larisa Dolina	undisclosed	SAFE
9	Rhino	"Номер Один" by Olya Polyakova	undisclosed	SAFE

=== Week 10 (27 March) ===
Performances on the tenth episode
#	Stage name	Song	Identity	Result
1	Moon	"New York, New York" by Frank Sinatra	Nadia Meiher	GUEST
2	Frog	"Тук, тук, тук" by Verka Serduchka	undisclosed	RISK
3	Dragonfly	"Take Me to Church" by Hozier	undisclosed	SAFE
4	Rhino	"Цвет настроения синий" by Philipp Kirkorov	undisclosed	SAFE
5	Dragon	"Соколята" by Vyacheslav Hursenko	undisclosed	SAFE
6	Cyclops	"Босая" by 2Mashi	undisclosed	SAFE
7	Catfish	"Live is Life" by Opus	Irakli Makatsaria	OUT
8	Sun	"Euphoria" by Loreen	undisclosed	SAFE

=== Week 11 - Semifinal (3 April) ===
Performances on the eleventh episode
#	Stage name	Song	Identity	Result
1	Mojito	"Я и Сара" by Dzidzio	Oleksii Sukhanov	GUEST
2	Frog	"Кружит" by Monatik	Yevhen Smoryhin	OUT
3	Rhino	"Там нет меня" by Igor Nikolayev	undisclosed	WIN
4	Sun	"только ты" by Zhanna Aguzarova	undisclosed	WIN
5	Dragonfly	"Bad Guy" by Billie Eilish	Anastasia Prikhodko	OUT
6	Dragon	"Зеленоглазое такси" by Mikhail Boyarsky	undisclosed	WIN
7	Cyclops	"Love You like a Love Song" by Selena Gomez & the Scene	Michelle Andrade	OUT

=== Week 12 - Finale (10 April) ===
Performances on the twelfth episode
#	Stage name	Song	Identity	Result
1	Rhino	"Это всё" by DDT	Oleksii Trytenko	THIRD
2	Dragon	"Feel" by Robbie Williams	undisclosed	SAFE
3	Sun	"My Heart Will Go On" by Celine Dion	undisclosed	SAFE
4	Crayfish	"Песня Водяного" by Anatoly Papanov	Iryna Bilyk	GUEST
5	Chimera	"Hey Mama" by David Guetta feat. Nicki Minaj, Bebe Rexha, & Afrojack	Volodymyr Ostapchuk	GUEST
Sing-off details
1	Dragon	"Иностранец" by Valery Meladze	Arsen Mirzoyan	RUNNER-UP
2	Sun	"Иностранец" by Valery Meladze	undisclosed	WINNER
Winner's Song
1	Sun	"The Show Must Go On" by Queen	Zlata Ognevich	

== Season 2 ==
=== Contestants ===
Stage name	Celebrity	Occupation	Episodes									
Stage name	Celebrity	Occupation	1	2	3	4	5	6	7	8	9	10
Giraffe	Mélovin	Singer	SAFE		SAFE		SAFE		SAFE	SAFE	WIN	WINNER
Scandal	Olga Cybulska	Singer		SAFE		SAFE		RISK	SAFE	SAFE	WIN	RUNNER-UP
Fly Agaric	Oleg Kenzov	Singer		RISK		SAFE		SAFE	SAFE	SAFE	WIN	THIRD
Cat	Petya Cherniy	Singer	SAFE		RISK		SAFE		RISK	RISK	OUT	
Tiger	Sergey Babkin	Singer		SAFE		SAFE		SAFE	SAFE	SAFE	OUT	
Robot	Daryna Tregubova	TV Presenter	SAFE		SAFE		SAFE		SAFE	SAFE	OUT	
Gorilla	Tayanna	Singer		SAFE		RISK		SAFE	SAFE	OUT		
Piglet	Pavlo Zibrov	Singer	SAFE		SAFE		RISK		OUT			
Bumblebee	Stepan Kazanin	Comedian		SAFE		SAFE		OUT				
Bat	Ostap Stupka	Actor	RISK		SAFE		OUT					
Owlet	Serhii Tanchynets	Singer		SAFE		OUT						
Fairy	Lily Rebryk	Actress	SAFE		OUT							
Griffon	Andriy Pyatov	Footballer		OUT								
Bayan	Inna Bilokon	Actress	OUT									

The masked singer won their face-off and remained in the competition.
The masked singer was safe from elimination.
The masked singer lost their face-off and was in the bottom three/two, but was not eliminated.
The masked singer was eliminated from the competition and unmasked upon their elimination.
The masked singer did not perform.
The masked singer self-eliminated from the competition.

=== Guest appearances ===
Stage Name	Celebrity	Occupation	Episodes									
Stage Name	Celebrity	Occupation	1	2	3	4	5	6	7	8	9	10
Finger	Oleksandra Zaritska	Singer										
Mink	Dasha Astafieva	Actress, model										
Tea Flower	Kateryna Pavlenko	Singer										
Ninja	Egor Krutogolov	Actor, humorist										
Queen of Hearts	Vera Brezhneva	Singer										

== Episodes ==
=== Week 1 (23 October) ===
Group Performance: "The Greatest Show" from The Greatest Showman

Performances on the first episode
#	Stage name	Song	Identity	Result
1	Robot	"Habanera" from Carmen	undisclosed	SAFE
2	Bayan	"Арлекино" by Alla Pugacheva	Inna Bilokon	OUT
3	Cat	"Тает лёд" by Griby	undisclosed	SAFE
4	Fairy	"Леди совершенство" by Tatyana Voronina	undisclosed	SAFE
5	Piglet	"Гуси" by Wellboy	undisclosed	SAFE
6	Giraffe	"Ты ― моя нежность" by Nargiz	undisclosed	SAFE
7	Bat	"Мышь" by Philipp Kirkorov	undisclosed	RISK

=== Week 2 (30 October) ===
Performances on the second episode
#	Stage name	Song	Identity	Result
1	Griffon	"We Will Rock You" by Queen	Andriy Pyatov	OUT
2	Bumblebee	"Парень чернокожий" by Leonid Agutin	undisclosed	SAFE
3	Gorilla	"I Have Nothing" by Whitney Houston	undisclosed	SAFE
4	Tiger	"Любовь, похожая на сон" by Alla Pugacheva	undisclosed	SAFE
5	Scandal	"Я" by Lolita	undisclosed	SAFE
6	Fly Agaric	"Мой рай" by MakSim	undisclosed	RISK
7	Owlet	"Вчителька" by TIK	undisclosed	SAFE

=== Week 3 (6 November) ===
Performances on the third episode
#	Stage name	Song	Identity	Result
1	Piglet	"А мы любили" by Hi-Fi	undisclosed	SAFE
2	Bat	"You Can Leave Your Hat On" by Joe Cocker	undisclosed	SAFE
3	Fairy	"Так просто" by Iryna Bilyk	Lily Rebryk	OUT
4	Robot	"Без бою" by Okean Elzy	undisclosed	SAFE
5	Cat	"Полон" by Kadnay	undisclosed	RISK
6	Giraffe	"Кобра" by The Hardkiss & Monatik	undisclosed	SAFE

=== Week 4 (13 November) ===
Performances on the fourth episode
#	Stage name	Song	Identity	Result
1	Owlet	"День народження" by Vopli Vidoplyasova	Serhii Tanchynets	OUT
2	Scandal	"Красиво" by Tina Karol	undisclosed	SAFE
3	Fly Agaric	"Гуляночка" by Verka Serduchka	undisclosed	SAFE
4	Tiger	"Мокрая" by Monatik & Quest Pistols Show	undisclosed	SAFE
5	Gorilla	"Hot Stuff" by Donna Summer	undisclosed	RISK
6	Bumblebee	"Беги по небу" by Maxim Fadeev	undisclosed	SAFE

=== Week 5 (20 November) ===
Performances on the fifth episode
#	Stage name	Song	Identity	Result
1	Robot	"Попытка No. 5" by Nu Virgos	undisclosed	SAFE
2	Piglet	"Эй, секундочку" by Olya Polyakova	undisclosed	RISK
3	Bat	"Песня Гениального Сыщика" by Muslim Magomayev	Ostap Stupka	OUT
4	Giraffe	"1944" by Jamala	undisclosed	SAFE
5	Cat	"Вихідний" by Dzidzio	undisclosed	SAFE

=== Week 6 (27 November) ===
Performances on the sixth episode
#	Stage name	Song	Identity	Result
1	Finger	"Mercy" by Duffy	Oleksandra Zaritska	GUEST
2	Gorilla	"Танцы на стёклах" by Maxim Fadeev	undisclosed	SAFE
3	Bumblebee	"На раёне" by Potap & Nastya	Stepan Kazanin	OUT
4	Fly Agaric	"Птичка" by HammAli & Navai	undisclosed	SAFE
5	Tiger	"Delilah" by Tom Jones	undisclosed	SAFE
6	Scandal	"Твои глаза" by LOBODA	undisclosed	RISK

=== Week 7 (4 November) ===
Performances on the seventh episode
#	Stage name	Song	Identity	Result
1	Mink	"In Your Eyes" by Kylie Minogue	Dasha Astafieva	GUEST
2	Fly Agaric	"Красный бархат" by КОРРУПЦИЯ	undisclosed	SAFE
3	Giraffe	"Strong Enough" by Cher	undisclosed	SAFE
4	Cat	"Love It РИТМ" by Monatik	undisclosed	RISK
5	Robot	"No Roots" by Alice Merton	undisclosed	SAFE
6	Gorilla	"Happy" by Pharrell Williams	undisclosed	SAFE
7	Tiger	"Журавлі" by The Hardkiss	undisclosed	SAFE
8	Scandal	"Зима в сердце" by Gosti iz budushchego	undisclosed	SAFE
9	Piglet	"Де би я" by Sergey Babkin	Pavlo Zibrov	OUT

=== Week 8 (11 December) ===
Performances on the eighth episode
#	Stage name	Song	Identity	Result
1	Tea Flower	"Diamonds" by Rihanna	Kateryna Pavlenko	GUEST
2	Robot	"Шaленій" by Gaitana	undisclosed	SAFE
3	Tiger	"Believer" by Imagine Dragons	undisclosed	SAFE
4	Gorilla	"Firework" by Katy Perry	Tayanna	OUT
5	Fly Agaric	"Гранули" by TNMK	undisclosed	SAFE
6	Scandal	"Нас не догонят" by t.A.T.u.	undisclosed	SAFE
7	Giraffe	"Dancing Queen" by ABBA	undisclosed	SAFE
8	Cat	"Я стану морем" by Ani Lorak	undisclosed	RISK

=== Week 9 - Semifinal (18 December) ===
Performances on the ninth episode
#	Stage name	Song	Identity	Result
1	Ninja	"Чао, бамбино" by Car-Man	Egor Krutogolov	GUEST
2	Robot	"Lambada" by Kaoma	Daryna Tregubova	OUT
3	Fly Agaric	"Ти подобаєшся мені" by Viktor Pavlik	undisclosed	WIN
4	Tiger	"TDME" by Antytila	Serhii Babkin	OUT
5	Giraffe	"Позови меня с собой" by Alla Pugacheva	undisclosed	WIN
6	Cat	"Susanna" by The Art Company	Petya Cherniy	OUT
7	Scandal	"Живи спокойно, страна!" by Alla Pugacheva	undisclosed	WIN

=== Week 10 - Finale (25 December) ===
Performances on the tenth episode
#	Stage name	Song	Identity	Result
1	Queen of Hearts	"Опера #2" by Vitas	Vera Brezhneva	GUEST
2	Fly Agaric	"Розовые розы" by Vesyolye Rebyata	Oleg Kenzov	THIRD
3	Scandal	"Сильная женщина" by Alla Pugacheva	Olga Cybulska	RUNNER-UP
4	Giraffe	"Skyfall" by Adele	undisclosed	WINNER
Winner's Song
1	Giraffe	"We Are the Champions" by Queen	Mélovin	

== New Year's Special (2021) ==
Group Performance: «All I Want for Christmas Is You» by Mariah Carey

#	Stage name	Song	Identity	Result
1	Christmas Tree	«Ёлки» by Verka Serduchka	Slava Kaminskaya	
	Giraffe	«Dancing Queen» by ABBA	Mélovin	
2	Mirror Man	«Зима-холода» by Andrey Gubin	Dima Kolyadenko	
3	Mouse on Skis	«А снег идёт» by Zhanna Aguzarova	Alena Vinnitskaya	
4	Christmas Ball	«Новогодняя» by Verka Serduchka	Natalia Mohylevska	
	Olya Polyakova & Dzidzio	«Щасливі люди» by Olya Polyakova & Dzidzio	Olya Polyakova, Dzidzio	
5	Brown Bear in White Bear Costume	«She’s a lady» by Tom Jones	Ivo Bobul	
6	King Penguin	«Айсберг» by Alla Pugacheva	Anastasia Prikhodko	
	NK & Verka Serduchka	«Попа как у Ким» by NK	NK, Andriy Danylko, Inna Bilokon	
	Moon	«Щедрик» by Tina Karol	Lily Rebryk	
7	Deer Candlestick	«Мне не жаль» by Iryna Bilyk	Jerry Heil	
	Molfar	«Белый снег» by Alla Pugacheva	Pavlo Kostitsyn	
	Sun	«Euphoria» by Loreen	Zlata Ognevich	
8	Snow Queen	«Снежинка» from s/f «Чародеи»	Tina Karol	
	Dzidzio	«Зимова казка» by Dzidzio	Dzidzio	
	NK	Potpourri: «Обидно/Красное вино» by NK	NK	
	Giraffe & Sun	«Happy New Year» by ABBA	Mélovin, Zlata Ognevich	
	Verka Serduchka	«Sexy» by Verka Serduchka	Andriy Danylko, Inna Bilokon	

Jury guessed the mask
Jury didn't guess the mask
Previous seasons masks' songs
Jury member's song
Duet of jury members
Duet of previous seasons masks
