= Kraina =

2003 studio album by Iryna Bilyk

- Original cover

Studio album by Iryna Bilyk
- Released: 10 June 2003
- Recorded: 2002
- Venue: Kyiv, Ukraine
- Studio: Mamamusic Studio
- Genre: Pop
- Length: 59:00
- Language: Ukrainian; Polish
- Label: JRC; Mamamusic
- Producer: Iryna Bilyk; Yurii Nikitin

Iryna Bilyk chronology
Biłyk (2002)	Kraina (2003)	Lyubov. Yad (2004)

Alternative cover
- 2008 re-release cover

Singles from Kraina
- 1. "Kraina" Released: August 2001; 2. "Ty anhel" Released: December 2001; 3. "Ne plach, Marichko" Released: April 2002; 4. "Doroga" Released: August 2002; 5. "Tvoi ruky" Released: October 2002; 6. "Movchaty" Released: March 2003; 7. "A meni b tudy" Released: June 2003

Kraina (Ukrainian: Країна; transl. Country) is the eighth studio album by Ukrainian singer Iryna Bilyk released on 10 June 2003 by JRC and Mamamusic. This is the last Ukrainian-language album by Biylk to date.

== Overview ==
Work on the album began in 2001. Two albums were recorded in parallel: Kraina and its Polish version Biłyk. Most of the songs on the album were written by Bilyk herself. The song "Do pochatku" was performed by Bilyk at a new year's concert in 1999. The only non-Ukrainian-language song on the album is "Obcy ty", which was written in Polish by Michał Kuźmiński and also included on previous album Biłyk (2002). The song "Movchaty" recorded with the band Skryabin. Lyrics for the song "Banduriste, orle syzii..." was taken from poem "K. Markevichu" (1840) by Ukrainian writer Taras Shevchenko. The album is divided into two equal parts: Dusha (Soul) and Sertse (Heart).

The album was released on 10 June 2003 in Ukraine.

In 2001 the music video for the song "Kraina" (directed by Alan Badoev) was shot, but it was later remounted and released in 2003 as a music video for the song "A meni b tudy". In total seven more music videos were made to support the album: "Ne plach, Marichko" (2002, directed by Mxim Papernik), "Doroga" (2002, directed by Viktor Pryduvalov), "Kraina" (2002, directed by Papernik), "Ty anhel" (2002, directed by Papernik), "Tvoi ruky" (2003, directed by Papernik) and "Movchaty" (2003, directed by Pryduvalov). Music video for "Banduriste, orle syzii" was directed by Badoev in 2004 but was released only in 2012.

A concert tour of Ukraine was held in support of the album. The concerts were sold out.

In 2008 the album was re-released by Moon Records in honor of the 20th anniversary of Iryna Bilyk's creative activity.

In 2020 the song "Movchaty" was included in the list "20 iconic songs for 20 years" of the Ukrainian music award YUNA.

== Track listing ==
Kraina
No.	Title	Lyrics	Music	Length
1.	"Doroga"	Iryna Bilyk; Petro Maha	Serhii Dotsenko	3:36
2.	"Tvoi ruky"	Bilyk	Dotsenko	4:00
3.	"Obcy ty"	Michał Kuźmiński	Bilyk	4:16
4.	"Ya vidrizhu khvyli"	Bilyk	Bilyk; Dotsenko	4:19
5.	"Sorry"	Bilyk	Bilyk	4:13
6.	"Ty anhel"	Bilyk	Bilyk	4:31
7.	"Movchaty"	Andriy Kuzmenko	Serhii Hera; Kuzmenko; Andrii Pidluzhni; Oleksii Zavolski	4:28
8.	"Kraina"	Anatolii Matviichuk	Bilyk	3:46
9.	"A meni b tudy"	Matviichuk	Bilyk	3:53
10.	"38"	Bilyk; Fedir Mlynchenko	Dotsenko	3:51
11.	"Ne plach, Marichko"	Bilyk; Mlynchenko	Bilyk	5:06
12.	"Cherez vysoki hory"	Bilyk; Maha	Dotsenko	3:37
13.	"Banduriste, orle syzii"	Taras Shevchenko	Oleksandr Tyshchenko	5:22
14.	"Do pochatku"	Matviichuk	Bilyk	3:41
Total length:				59:00

Kraina — Reissue (Bonus tracks)
No.	Title	Lyrics	Music	Length
15.	"Doroga" (Remix)	Bilyk; Maha	Dotsenko	2:53
16.	"Kraina" (Remix)	Anatolii Matviichuk	Bilyk	3:39

== Personnel ==
- Iryna Bilyk – lead vocals (all tracks), songwriting (1–6, 8–12, 13)
- Dmytro Klimashenko – lead vocals (5)
- Skryabin – lead vocals (7)
- Serhii Dotsenko – keyboards (1–7, 10, 12, 13), guitar (1–6, 10, 12, 13), percussion (2), background vocals (2–4, 10, 12, 13), arrangement (1–7, 10, 12, 13), programming (1–7, 10, 12, 13), recording (5)
- Zhan Bolotov – keyboards (8, 9, 11, 14), recording (8, 9, 11), mixing (8, 9, 11), arrangement (8, 9, 11, 14), programming (8, 9, 11, 14)
- Oleh Barabash – recording (8), mixing (8)
- Serhii Dobrovolskii – guitar (1–4, 6–10, 12–14), recording (all tracks), mixing (all tracks)
- Oleksii Zvolinskii – guitar (7)
- Eduard Kosse – bayan (6, 8, 9)
- Oles Zhuravchak – flute (3, 8, 9), tsymbaly (9), Jew's harp (9), ocarina (9)
- Vitalii Savenko – bass guitar (13)
- Myroslav Nazarchuk – tsymbaly (9)
- Volodymyr Kopot – trumpet (8, 11)
- Serhii Klymchenko – tuba (11)
- Nina Myrvoda – background vocals (9)
- Natalia Rebrik – background vocals (9)
- Ukrainian fan club – background vocals (10)
