= Bez grima =

2017 studio album by Iryna Bilyk

Studio album by Iryna Bilyk
- Released: April 6, 2017
- Genre: Pop
- Language: Russian, Ukrainian
- Label: Best Music
- Producer: Orest Galitskiy

Iryna Bilyk chronology
Rassvet (2014)	Bez grima (2017)	50 (2020)

Singles from Bez grima
- 1. "Ne pitay" Released: January 18, 2018

Professional ratings
Review scores
Source	Rating
InterMedia	4/5 stars

Bez grima (Russian: Без грима; transl. Without makeup) is the twelfth studio album by Ukrainian singer Iryna Bilyk released in 2017.

== About album ==
Iryna called the new album "very personal", she wanted to open her soul with this album. In comparison with the previous longplay, the songs are more calm and gentle here, and they help to convey all the sensuality that the singer claims about. According to the singer, she has been preparing this album for ten years, as some of the songs that are postponed "for later" become the most valuable and most important. Also, the long non-release of the album was affected by the situation with arranger Gennadiy Pugachev, who took 45 thousand dollars from the singer for working on the album and disappeared without a trace with the money. Orest Galitskiy became the new arranger and producer of the album.

On October 5, 2015, the video for the song "Tufli" was released, which was filmed back in 2006, but all this time lay on the shelf. The song was originally intended to be included on the album Bez grima.

The artist presented the new album on her 47th birthday, April 6, 2017, at an acoustic presentation concert. On the same day, viewers could see it on the M1 TV channel. On April 12, the album became available on all digital platforms.

On January 19, 2018, the singer presented the video for the song "Ne pitay".

== Tour ==
In support of the album, after a five-year break, Iryna went on a concert tour "Bez grima. Luchshee. O lyubvi", which began on February 1, 2018 in Sumy, and ended with three sold-out concerts in April in Kyiv. On February 16, 2019, the TV version of the concert premiered on Inter TV channel.

== Track listing ==
No.	Title	Writer(s)	Length
1.	"Intro"		2:15
2.	"А мне бы в небо" ("A mne by v nebo")	Iryna Bilyk	3:44
3.	"Греческая" ("Grecheskaya")	Kostas Martakis, Nikos Vertis, Iryna Bilyk	3:43
4.	"Разреши" ("Razreshi")	Iryna Bilyk	3:22
5.	"Снился мне снег" ("Snilsya mne sneg")	Iryna Bilyk	3:19
6.	"У ветра есть тайна" ("U vetra est tayna")	Iryna Bilyk	3:44
7.	"Не питай" ("Ne pitay")	Aleksandr Voevutskiy	3:27
8.	"Не оставляй" ("Ne ostavlay")	Iryna Bilyk	4:39
9.	"Седой старик" ("Sedoy starik")	Yevgeniy Rybchinskiy	2:52
10.	"Боже мой" ("Bozhe moy")	Iryna Bilyk	4:42
Total length:			35:48

== Release history ==
Region	Date	Format	Label
Ukraine	April 6, 2017	CD	Best Music
World	April 12, 2017	streaming; digital download	Best Music
