= Olena Shoptenko =

Ukrainian dancer and choreographer

- Олена Вікторівна Шоптенко
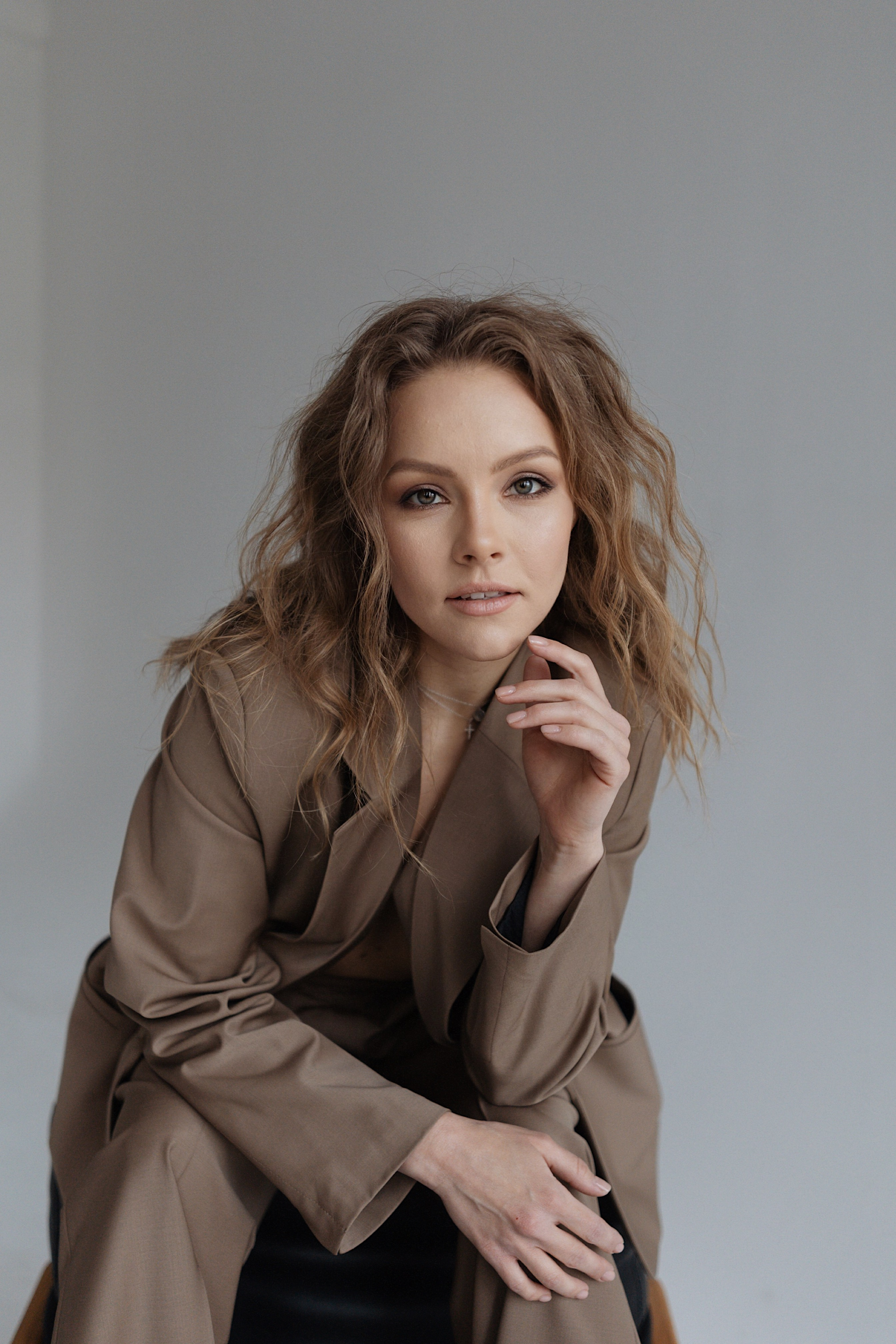
- Born: December 21, 1987 (age 38); Kyiv, Ukrainian SSR, Soviet Union
- Occupations: Dancer; Choreographer
- Known for: World Champion in Latin dances (2006), Winner and choreographer of Dancing with the Stars
- Spouses: Dmytro Dikusar (m. 2013; div. 2016); Oleksiy Ivanov (m. 2016)
- Children: Oleksiy (b. 2018)
- Awards: World Champion (IDSA, 10 dances, 2006; IDU, Latin dances, 2006); Ukrainian Champion (10 dances, 2007); Winner of Dancing with the Stars (2006)

Olena Viktorivna Shoptenko (born December 21, 1987) is a Ukrainian dancer and choreographer, known for being a world champion in Latin dances. She won the 2006 World Championship in the 10-dance program (youth under 21, IDSA), the 2006 World Championship in Latin dances (youth under 21, IDU), and the 2007 Ukrainian Championship in 10 dances (youth under 21). She is a winner, and later the head choreographer and judge, of the Ukrainian television program Dancing with the Stars (Танці з зірками).

== Biography ==
Olena Shoptenko was born on December 21, 1987, in Kyiv, Ukrainian SSR. Her father is a businessman involved in mushroom cultivation. Her mother, a neurologist at Oleksandrivska Clinical Hospital, died in May 2020. Shoptenko has two brothers.

In June 2013, she married Dmytro Dikusar. In April 2016, she announced their divorce. On October 15, 2016, she married entrepreneur Oleksiy Ivanov. On June 9, 2018, she gave birth to her son, Oleksiy.

== Choreographic career ==
Shoptenko began dancing in 1993. In 2000, with her partner Ihor Hryhorovych, she became the Kyiv champion and reached the semi-finals of the German Open in Mannheim. In 2005, she graduated from the Kyiv Business Lyceum with a gold medal and the "Lekos" award as the best graduate of the year. That same year, she enrolled at the Kyiv National Economic University named after Vadym Hetman.

As a dancer and choreographer, she participated in television projects including Dancing with the Stars, I Dance for You, Maydans, and The Biggest Loser. She worked with the show ballet Freedom, led by Olena Kolyadenko.

In 2006, she won the World Championship in 10 dances (youth under 21, Latin program) with partner Volodymyr Honcharov and also won Dancing with the Stars with partner Volodymyr Zelenskyy.

In 2007, she won the Ukrainian Championship in 10 dances (youth-2) with Volodymyr Honcharov and participated in Dancing with the Stars – Season 3 with Maksym Nelipa.

In 2008, she worked as a choreographer for I Dance for You. In 2009, she participated in I Dance for You – Season 2 with Vasyl Bondarchuk and in I Dance for You – Season 3: Battle of Choreographers as one of three choreographers, earning second place.

In 2009, with Dmytro Dikusar, she founded the show ballet Kitch.

In 2010, she became the head choreographer for Kyiv in the Maydans project.

From October 11 to November 29, 2015, she served as a judge on the show Little Giants on the 1+1 channel.

In 2020, she participated in Dancing with the Stars with Oleg Vynnyk. The pair was disqualified due to non-appearance on the dance floor twice consecutively after Shoptenko contracted COVID-19.

== Public activities ==
In 2014, Shoptenko participated in the charity calendar project Shchyri, dedicated to promoting Ukrainian national clothing. Organized by the Domosfera shopping center and Gres Todorchuk agency, all proceeds supported wounded soldiers of the Anti-Terrorist Operation (ATO) at the Kyiv Military Hospital and the Ukrainian Catholic University’s volunteer center Volunteer Hundred.

Since the onset of Russia's full-scale invasion in 2022, Shoptenko launched the dance-therapy project HUSH! Dance Therapy. A portion of the proceeds supports a shelter for internally displaced persons in Lviv and the Your Support foundation.

== Awards and achievements ==
Master of Sport of international class.

- In 2000, with partner Ihor Hryhorovych, became Kyiv champion and reached the semi-finals of the German Open in Mannheim.
- World Champion in ballroom dancing (youth, 2006).
- Ukrainian Champion (2007).
- Winner of Dancing with the Stars with Volodymyr Zelenskyy (2006).
