= Ne khovai ochei =

2018 Iryna Bilyk song

Single by Iryna Bilyk
- Released: 17 May 2018
- Genre: Pop
- Length: 3:27
- Label: Best Music
- Songwriter: Yuriy Lemchuk
- Producer: Nataliya Lavrischeva

Iryna Bilyk singles chronology
"Podruzhka" (2017)	"Ne khovai ochei" (2018)	"Vpershe" (2018)

Music video
- "Ne khovai ochei" on YouTube

"Ne khovai ochei" (Ukrainian: «Не ховай очей», lit. 'Don't hide eyes') is the single by Ukrainian singer Iryna Bilyk released in 2018.

== Music video ==
The music video was released on the same day as the song, on the International Day Against Homophobia, Transphobia and Biphobia, May 17, 2018. The clip was directed by Yuriy Dvizhon, who has previously shot for Bilyk videos "Volshebniki" and "Ne pitay". According to the idea, the video starred ten characters who "do not hide their eyes" and openly talk about their sexual orientation and gender identity. One of them was the director himself.

== Track listing ==
- "Ne khovai ochei" — 3:27
- "Ne khovai ochei" (Shnaps & Sanya Dymov Remix) — 3:32
- "Ne khovai ochei" (Remix by Boosin) — 3:40

== Charts ==
=== Weekly charts ===
Chart (2018)	Peak position
Ukraine Airplay (TopHit)	16

=== Year-end charts ===
Chart (2018)	Position
Ukraine Airplay (TopHit)	73

== Awards and nominations ==
Year	Award	Category	Result
2019	YUNA	Best hit	Nominated

== Documentary ==
Kyivpride together with director Yuri Dvizhon presented in 2018 a documentary film "Ne khovai ochei" which was timed to coincide with the National Coming Out Day on October 11. In the film, characters of the music video, including human rights activist Sofia Lapina, poet Anna Kukushkina, transgender model and blogger Julia Geltsman, model Nantina Dronchak and others, told about their choice to be open representatives of LGBT and explained why it is important for them. The video and the film starred the Director Yuriy Dvizhon, this was his public coming out. It premiered on the Novyi Kanal TV channel and on YouTube.

On June 19, 2019, the second part of the film was presented under the title "Don't howay eyes 2: a film about Ukrainian LGBT immigrants".
