= Iryna Fedyshyn =

Ukrainian singer and songwriter (born 1987)

Iryna Fedyshyn Ірина Федишин
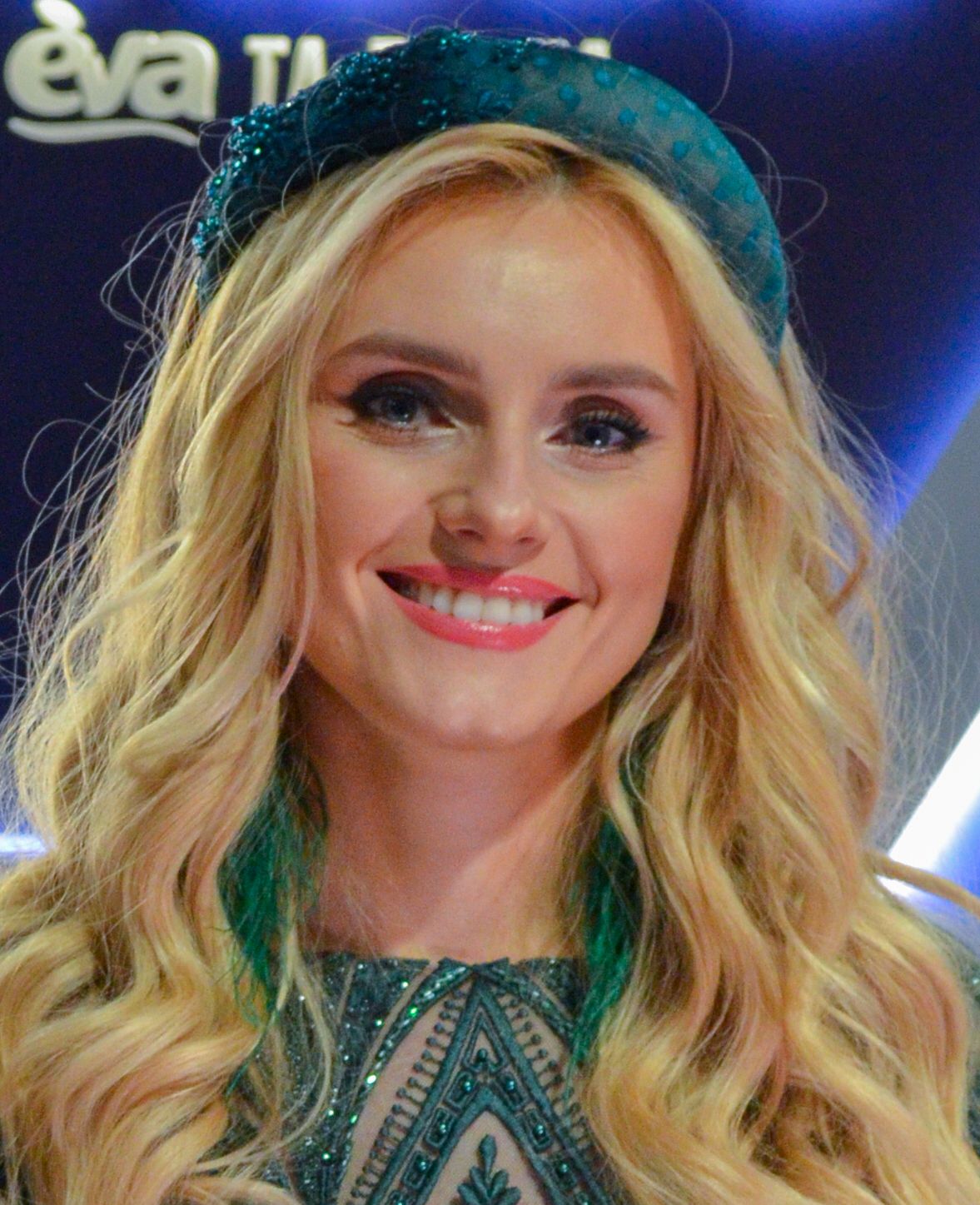
- Iryna Fedyshyn at M1 Music Awards in 2019

Background information
- Born: Iryna Petrivna Fedyshyn; 1 February 1987 (age 39); Lviv, Ukrainian SSR, USSR
- Genres: Pop music; pop folk
- Occupations: singer; songwriter
- Instruments: Synthesizer; guitar
- Years active: 2005–present
- Label: Best Music
- Website: irynafedyshyn.com

Iryna Petrivna Fedyshyn (Ukrainian: Іри́на Петрі́вна Феди́шин; born 1 February 1987) is a Ukrainian singer and songwriter.

== Biography ==
Iryna Fedyshyn was born on 1 February 1987 in Lviv, Ukrainian SSR, into a family of musicians. From an early age, she showed musical, vocal and stage abilities.

Fedyshyn's father, although himself a musician, hoped that his daughter would succeed at chess. However, Iryna took to the synthesizer, on which she learned to improvise and write her first songs.

At the age of thirteen, the girl decided to get a musical education and went to study at a music school. Thanks to her home education, she was immediately accepted into the fourth grade of the music school, from which she graduated with honors. There she also conducted concert programs. She studied economics at the Ivan Franko National University of Lviv and at the same time took private music and vocal lessons.

== Musical career ==
Fedyshyn participated in youth music competitions and festivals, where she won prizes. Some songs were included in the rotation on Ukrainian radio stations. In 2005, she performed in the semi-final of the Ukrainian national selection for the Eurovision Song Contest, and in 2006 and in 2009 she performed in the concert program "Schlager of the Year". In 2015 Iryna Fedyshyn won the Ukrainian-language song contest "Ukrainian Format" with the song "Sertsia stuk".

In 2016, she performed concerts in Ukraine, visited several dozen cities. On 4 November 2016, in Kyiv, in the October Palace, her solo concert "Tsvite Kalina" took place.

In 2018, she took part in the eighth season of the TV show "The Voice of Ukraine".

In 2020, Iryna Fedyshyn and her husband contracted COVID-19; this became known after her recovery. In September 2020, she presented the song "Tam de ty", which entered the top ten most popular hits on radio stations in Kyiv and Ukraine, and the music video for it gained more than a million views on YouTube. Later that year, the singer released several Christmas-themed songs.

Since January 2021, the singer took part in the project The Masked Singer Ukraine on the TV channel "Ukraine", but dropped out in the fourth episode. On 2 March, Fedyshyn presented the author song "Obiimy".

== Personal life ==
Fedyshyn lives in Lviv and is married to producer Vitalii Chovnyk. They have two sons: Yura and Oleh.

== Discography ==
Studio albums

- Tvii anhel (2007)
- Ukraina koliaduie (2007)
- Parol (2012)
- Ukraina koliaduie. Nove (2013)
- Tsvite kalyna (2015)
- Ty tilky mii (2018)

== Awards and nominations ==
Award	Year	Category	Nominee	Result	Ref.
Ukrainskyi format	2015	Contest laureate	Iryna Fedyshyn	Won	
Ukrainska pisnia roku	2017	Breakthrough of the year	Iryna Fedyshyn ("Chuzhi usta")	Won	
Ukrainska pisnia roku	2021	Pride of the Ukrainian song	Iryna Fedyshyn	Won	
Zolota zhar-ptitsia	2018	Female singer of the Year	Iryna Fedyshyn	Nominated	
Zolota zhar-ptitsia	2018	Hit of the Year	"Ty tilky mii"	Nominated	
Zolota zhar-ptitsia	2018	Popular hit	"Ty tilky mii"	Nominated	
Zolota zhar-ptitsia	2019	Popular hit	"Roman"	Nominated	
Zolota zhar-ptitsia	2020	Dance hit	"Prosto tantsiui"	Nominated	
Muzychna platforma	2019	Song of the Year	"Bili troiandy"	Won	
Muzychna platforma	2020	Song of the Year	"Tam de ty"	Won	
YUNA	2020	Best popular hit	"Khochu na Maldivy"	Nominated	
