= Farbi =

1997 studio album by Iryna Bilyk

Studio album by Iryna Bilyk
- Released: December 15, 1997

Farbi (from Ukrainian - Colors) is the fifth studio album by Ukrainian singer Iryna Bilyk, released on December 15, 1997, on the Nova Records label. The album was a resounding success, selling more than 1,000,000 copies in Ukraine alone.

To promote the album, the singer went on a large-scale all-Ukrainian tour "Farbi of the Sky" together with Russian singer Linda and producer Max Fadeev. Concerts took place in sports palaces and stadiums to full houses. Maxim Papernik shot video clips for the songs "And I Plivu" and "Lonely" (two versions).

At the Nova Records Awards, held in 1998, Iryna Bilyk was recognized as the singer of the year, the album "Farbi" became album of the year, and the video "And I Pliv" received the award for best video clip. At the Golden Firebird award, Bilyk also won victories in the categories "Singer of the Year" and "Album of the Year" ("Farbi").

In 2008, the album was re-released in honor of the singer's twentieth anniversary of creative activity.

== History of creation ==
Ukrainian singer Iryna Bilyk began her musical career in the late eighties. Studying at the Glyer State Music School, specializing in pop vocals, the nineteen-year-old artist already started her career in 1989, performing at the first Chervona Ruta festival. After getting to know Yuriy Nikitin and other musicians of the Ajax band, Bilyk began to collaborate with the group, which was named "This rain is for a long time". Bilyk's first cassette "Kuvala zozulya" contained songs recorded with the band during 1989-1991[1]. The singer's popularity gradually grew, "This rain is for a long time" was transformed into the production agency "Nova", and Iryna Bilyk focused on her solo career, becoming one of the main stars of Ukrainian pop music. In a few years, she went from the host of the New Year's TV show to an artist who went on a large-scale concert tour, received the title of Honored Artist of Ukraine, was recognized as the "Singer of the Year" and the author of "Song of the Year" at the "Taurian Games" festival, became the winner of the Grand Prix of the "Parade of Hit Parades" festival.

In August 1997, Iryna Bilyk started recording her fifth studio album. At that time, in addition to her debut tape "Kuvala cuckoo" (1990), she had three more albums recorded in the mid-1990s: "I'll tell you" (1994), "Nova" (1995) and "So simple" (1996). )[2][3]. In August 1997, the song "And I'm Swimming" was recorded at the "Ukrainian Professional Studio", and from September to December, the rest of the songs were recorded at the singer's agency's own studio, "Nova Studio". Yuriy Nikitin was the producer of the album, Iryna Bilyk and Zhan Bolotov were co-producers, and Oleg Barabash was in charge of sound engineering. Most of the music and words were written by the singer herself, she was assisted by Kostyantyn Hnatenko (lyrics "I will" and "I don't know"), Oleg Komlach (music and lyrics "Heart") and Zhan Bolotov (instrumental composition "Montserrat").

== Album release ==
Cassettes with the fifth album of Iryna Bilyk, named "Farby", went on sale on December 15, 1997. The album was released on the Nova Records label, which aimed to publish new Ukrainian music. Given that the founder of Nova Records was producer Bilyk Yuriy Nikitin, and the record company itself was named after her hit and album in 1995, the singer received the best edition of the album, which was distinguished by high quality printing and even had license marking. The Nova company was responsible for the promotion of the artist, having in its composition not only a label and a recording studio, but also a concert agency, establishing its own Nova Records Awards and starting the music TV program "Nova's World", which was broadcast on the STB TV channel. As a result, the sales figures of the Farby album became the highest in the country, exceeding 1 million sold copies[5].

During the following years, "Paints" was repeatedly republished on various media. In the early 2000s, NAC released reissues of the singer's rare albums, including Paints, on CD. In addition, cassettes and CDs with the album were released on the labels Mama Music (Yuri Nikitin's new project, which replaced Nova Records) and Moon Records.

== Songs and video clips ==
According to Iryna Bilyk, the album "Paints" was dedicated to modern problems, "it was specially written in order to draw the attention of young people and parents to the way we live." Disturbing motives appeared in the album under the influence of the last year of the singer's life, during which she "had to... visit apartments where there is no water and electricity, where people live who do not know how to live on, how to survive"[8 ]. Unlike Bilyk's first albums, where she performed songs in the Eurodance style, the new material was more complex and modern. If at the beginning of her career, Bilyk resembled Russia - both in appearance, hairstyle, and the emotionality of the songs - then on "Farbakh" the singer began to separate herself from the rest of the Ukrainian stage, trying to imitate world stars such as Madonna[9]. Editor A. Belay from the magazine "Galas" wrote that this is "one of those perfect albums that sets the bar of quality and professionalism so high that few of the existing, but already repeatedly praised, domestic artists can even come close". Ten years later, commenting on the 2008 reissue of Farba, the UMKA website noted that starting with this album and during the next two, Iryna Bilyk "practically failed to write weak songs".

Two of the biggest hits from the album were the songs "And I'm Swimming" and "Odynokaya", for which video clips were shot. Maksym Papernyk, with whom Iryna Bilyk studied at the theatre studio, became the director of the works. It was the cooperation with Bilyk that brought Papernik popularity, after which he shot music videos for Sofia Rotaru, Natalia Mogilevska, Oleksandr Ponomarev, Verka Serdyuchka and other domestic stars. The music video for the song "And I'm Swimming" was shot with cameraman Vadym Savitsky at the Film Studio named after O. Dovzhenka, which became a real calling card of the director. The clip became popular not only in Ukraine but also in "advanced" Russia, because the innovative video, which harmoniously combined music, direction and visual images, was shot by an unknown Ukrainian director. According to the plot of the bold music video, the singer in wet and translucent clothes floats in a boat, surrounded by snakes, eventually flying off it. In contrast to the heavy "And I'm Swimming", "Lonely" became a lyrical ballad about unrequited love. In the video clip, the heroine Bilyk sits next to an improvised bed, surrounded by toys, and addresses the star, telling her about her feelings.

== Tour ==
In support of the album, Iryna Bilyk went on an all-Ukrainian concert tour, which covered 16 cities of Ukraine and lasted from May to June 1998. Unlike the previous albums "Nova" and "So simple", "Farby" was presented at joint concerts with Linda and Max Fadeev. The idea of combining the performances appeared after it became clear that the concerts of Linda and Iryna Bilyk were supposed to take place at approximately the same time, and their songs touched on similar issues, so the musicians' agencies - "Nova" and "Ars-Ukraine" — agreed on the dates and places of joint performances. The tour was called "Colors of the Sky", combining the names of the songs "Colors" by Iryna Bilyk and "Begy po nebu" (Ukrainian: Run in the sky) by Max Fadeev from his solo album "Ножницы" (Ukrainian: Ножыцы).

It was decided in advance that this tour of Iryna Bilyk would be devoted to the problems of society, because the next one, which was planned for the fall and dedicated to ten years of professional activity, was supposed to be more "family" in nature, and it would be inappropriate to discuss the problems there. The main theme of the concerts was the fight against drugs. Linda's commitment to events dedicated to combating global problems was well known, and the song "N-a-r-k-o-t-y-k-y" appeared in the repertoire of Iryna Bilyk on "Farbakh". The four-hour concerts of Bilyk, Fadeev and Linda took place without any "warm-up" - the Ukrainian singer performed first, and after her - Russian artists, who were considered the "main program". The presenters of the show were well-known television characters, Verka Serdyuchka and her friend Gelya. Large-scale concerts were accompanied by modern light and sound effects and pyrotechnics. The musicians performed live: Iryna Bilyk joined the ballet "Avantage", which consisted of four black dancers and backing vocalists, and Fadeev and Linda - seven session musicians[15][8].

Despite ambitious plans and the desire to sell out in each city, the tour did not go as smoothly as the organizers expected. Only 700 tickets were sold for concerts in Lviv; sales of tickets for concerts in Uzhhorod were also low. Already after the end of the tour, Max Fadeev complained: "I was there for the first and last time... It was horror, horror, not a tour. In Western Ukraine, imagine, even local organizers say: you are Russian, therefore, you are dirt»[18]. In turn, Iryna Bilyk admitted that it was important for her team to see how the Muscovites work. Performances next to a reputable producer and a well-known performer became a good advertisement for her, especially since in many cities Bilyk was received much better than foreign stars[19]. In the end, the singer became the first Ukrainian performer who was able to gather a full audience in the National Palace "Ukraine" twice in a row.

== Reviews from critics ==
A reviewer for the UMKA portal noted that starting with this album, Irina Bilyk practically never managed to write weak songs. In his opinion, the album "Farbi" did not put her next to other stars, but created a completely separate height, where Irina Bilyk became the first and only.

== Participants of the recording ==
- Irina Bilyk - vocals, co-producer
- Zhan Bolotov - keyboards, arrangement, programming, co-producer
- Gennady Dyakonov - guitar, guitar samples
- Vadim Medved - bass guitar (1)
- Igor Zakus - bass guitar (2–8)
- Igor Sereda - drums
- Viktor Krisko - violin (7)
- Elena Romanovskaya - backing vocals (6)
- Sergey Manek - backing vocals (8)
- Aunt Katya - exotic vocals (3)
- Oleg Barabash - sound engineering
- Yuri Nikitin - producer
