= Volodymyr Ostapchuk =

Ukrainian television presenter (born 1984)

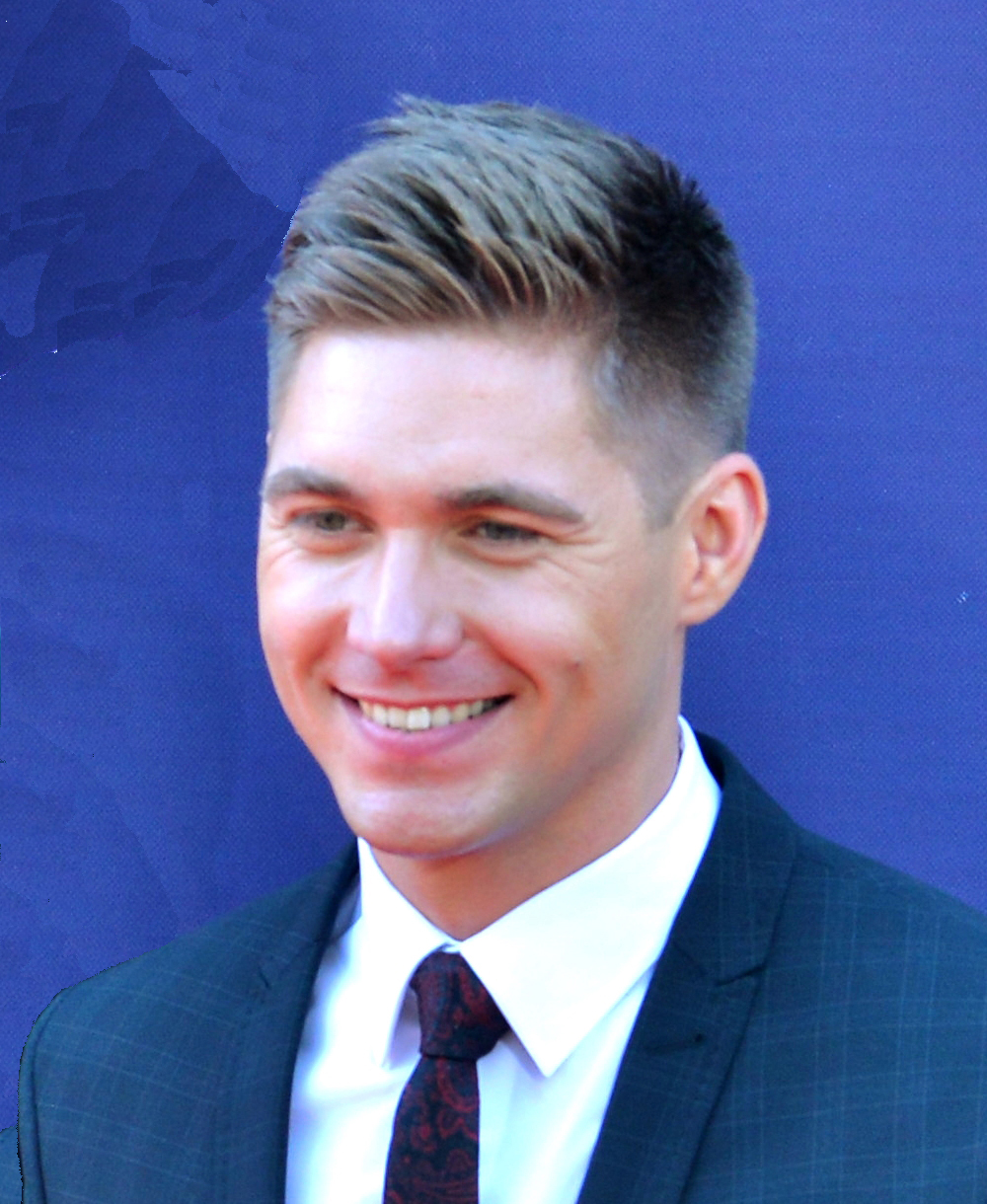
- Ostapchuk at the Red Carpet Ceremony of Eurovision 2017 in Kyiv
- Born: 27 September 1984 (age 41); Uman, Ukrainian SSR
- Education: Pavlo Tychyna Uman State Pedagogical University
- Occupations: Television presenter, radio presenter, voice actor
- Years active: 2009–present
- Employer: Ukraina
- Partner: Olena Voychenko (m. 2007–2020) Khrystyna Hornyak (m. 2020)
- Children: 2

Volodymyr Valeriyovych Ostapchuk (Ukrainian: Володимир Валерійович Остапчук) (born 27 September 1984) is a Ukrainian television presenter, voice actor and radio host.

Native of Uman, he is a graduate of the Uman State Pedagogical University.

Ostapchuk hosted Eurovision Song Contest 2017 alongside Oleksandr Skichko and Timur Miroshnychenko. It was the first time that the Eurovision Song Contest was presented by a male trio, and the second time, after the 1956 edition with a solo male presenter, that the contest didn't feature a female presenter.

In 2021, he became a host of The Masked Singer Ukraine on Ukraina.

== See also ==
- List of Eurovision Song Contest presenters
