= Alina Grosu =

Ukrainian singer (born 1995)

Alina Grosu Аліна Гросу
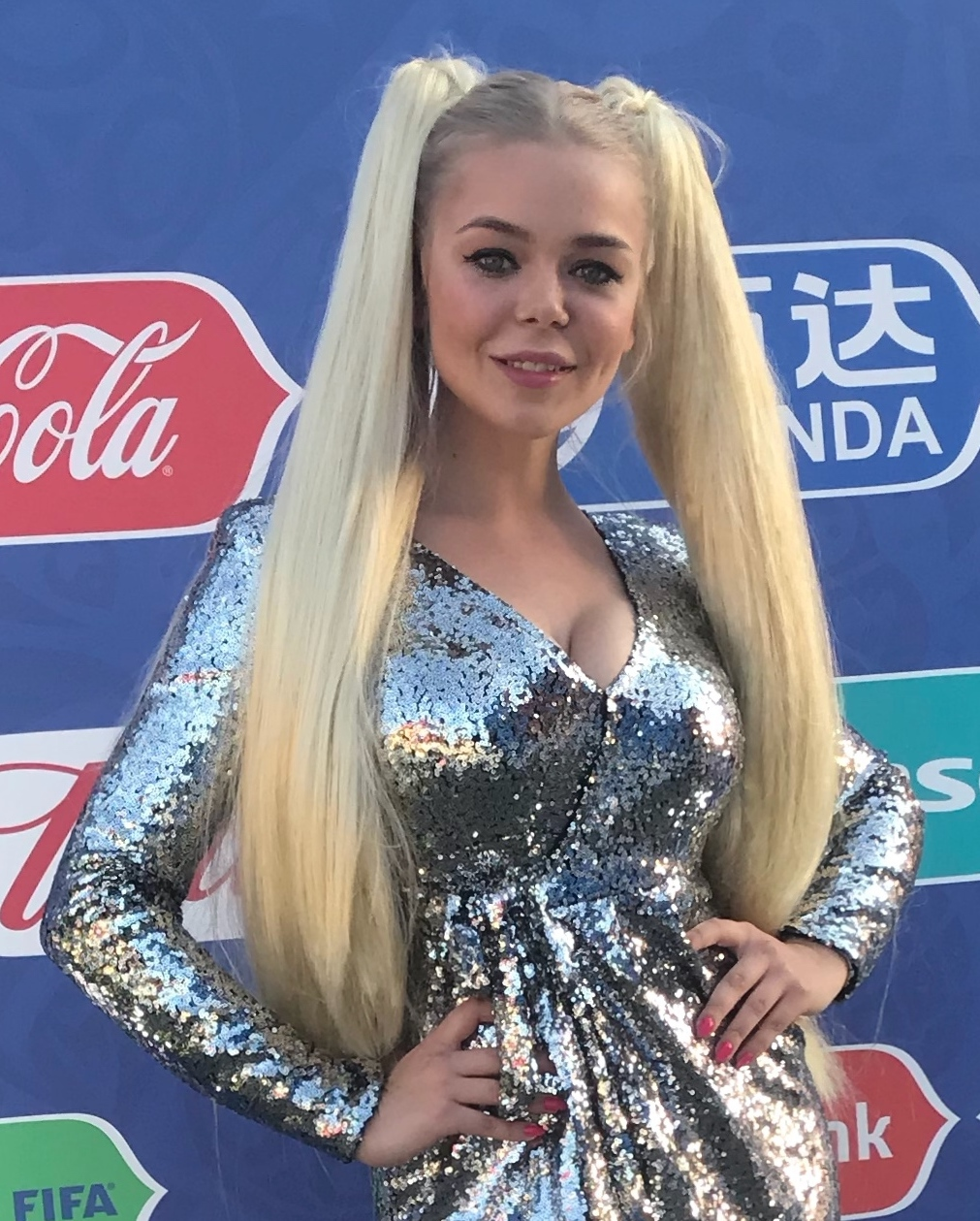
- Grosu in 2018

Background information
- Also known as: Alinka
- Born: 8 June 1995 (age 31); Chernivtsi, Ukraine
- Origin: Chernivtsi, Ukraine
- Genres: Pop
- Occupation: singer
- Years active: 1999–present

Alina Grosu (Ukrainian: Аліна Ґросу; born 8 June 1995) is a Ukrainian singer from the Romanian minority. She released her first studio album in 2000 and has released a total of four albums.

== Career ==
Grosu was born in Chernivtsi, Ukraine. She entered the music business after winning a singing contest. The prize was to record a song in a studio, where she met the singer Iryna Bilyk. They released four albums. After her success in music, she moved to Kyiv for practical reasons.

Grosu has participated in singing contests such as Slavianski Bazaar in Vitebsk and the Junior Eurovision Song Contest national finals.

In 2017, Alina Grosu changes her musical direction and releases a number of dance singles: “I want a bass”, “Remember”, “Last Night”. The success of the compositions was supported by scandalous video works, which gained more than 1 million views on YouTube in a day.

The beginning of 2018 was marked by the release of the new single "Lie"and the release of the 6th studio album "BASS"

Since November 2018, the singer has been performing under the new stage name GROSU and presenting a new single "Wild". The rebranding of the artist is accompanied by a change of image to a less outspoken one and a return to lyrical music. At the beginning of 2019, GROSU presented two more singles from the upcoming album - "Loved" and "VOVA". On April 1, the singer presented the musical short film Wildly Loved Vova, in which she appeared as a Catholic nun.

On March 12, 2021, the 7th studio personalized album "GROSU" was released, which included 17 tracks.

In the fall of 2021, the singer went on an All-Ukrainian tour with her new program "Invincible". Concerts were held in such cities as: Vinnytsia, Sumy, Zhytomyr, Kharkiv, Dnipro, and Odesa. The final the first part of the tour was a big concert in Kyiv on November 23, 2021 at the Palace "Ukraine".

== Studies ==
In 2010, in Kyiv, Alina graduated from Pechersk Gymnasium No. 75 as an external student and entered the Utyosov Academy of Variety Circus Art at the Faculty of Musical Art.

In the summer of 2010, Grosu went to Moscow, where she became a student at the All-Russian State University of Cinematography (VGIK). At the faculty of acting, Alina chose the specialty "Actress of cinema and theater" for herself.

In the spring of 2023, she left for the United States to study at the Hollywood School of Acting (Theatre of Arts Hollywood Acting School) in Los Angeles.

== Discography ==
2000 - Together with me

2002 - Bdzhilka

2004 - The sea is worried

2008 - I want to be naughty

2010 - Chalk on asphalt

2018 - Bass

2021 - GROSU

=== Music Videos ===
Year	Music Video
1999	«Summer»
2001	«Rushnychok»
2003	«Bdzhilka»
2003	«Boat»
2003	«Freedom»
2003	«Mama»
2004	«Homeless boy»
2004	«On the 19th floor»
2005	«Ocean is shaking»
2006	«Antarctic blizzards»
2006	«I want to be naughty»
2008	«Mayhem»
2008	«Everybody dance»
2009	«Wet eyelashes»
2009	«Chalk on asphalt»
2010	«Forgive me, my love»
2010	«Forgive me, my love»(feat. Lion)
2011	«Let's remember this summer»
2012	«Adult»
2012	«Let Go»
2013	«Yours forever»
2014	«Brakes»
2014	«Three words»
2015	«Don't forget»
2015	«Jealous»
2015	«Christmas song»
2016	«The dog»
2016	«Alcohol/Outlaw»
2017	«I want bass»
2017	«Recall»
2017	«The last night»
2018	«Lie»
2018	«Nike»
2019	«Wild»
2019	«Loved»
2019	«VOVA»
2019	«Dirty dancing»
2019	«Invincible»
2019	«The moon»
2020	«Arrested»
2020	«N. А. R. К. О. Т. И. К. И.»
2020	«Naked King»
2021	«Hold me» (OST «Two over the abyss»)
	«The towel» (feat. POLYANSKIY)
	«Miriada»
	«Crimson lips»
	«Feelings on tape» (feat. POLYANSKIY)
2022	«Loved»
	«Meadow»
	«Lonely winter»
2023	«Thunderstorms»

== Filmografia ==
- 2007 — "A Very New Year's Movie, or Night at the Museum" (musical; dir. Roman Butovsky) - "Little Red Riding Hood"
- 2009 — "Alice's Birthday" (animation; dir. Sergei Seregin) - "Alice (voice)"
- 2013 — Bird in a Cage (TV series; dir. Anatoly Grigoriev) - Natasha, Boris' fiancee
- 2013 — "The Secret of the Cossack Temple" (fiction and journalistic; dir. Andrey Kior), "Adamakh Film" - "The Girl at the Temple"
- 2014 — "Crime in focus" (TV series; dir. Anatoly Grigoriev) - "girl from a photo exhibition"
- 2015 — "Officers' Wives" (TV series; dir. Dmitry Petrun) - Tatyana Terekhova
- 2016 — I Love My Husband (TV series; Star Media production) - 'Journalist'
- 2017 — The Specialists (TV series; dir. Oleg Maslennikov) — Anfisa Tkachenko
- 2018 — "Confused" (TV series; dir. Vyacheslav Nikiforov, Anario Mamedov)
- 2019 — "Secret Love" (Ukraine) or "Trial" in Russia (TV series; dir. Anatoly Grigoriev) - Svetlana
- 2019 — "Castle in the Sand" (TV series; dir. Alexey Gusev) - "Olya"
- 2019 — "Love without memory" (TV series; dir. Andrey Komarov) - "Laura"
- 2020 — "Love with the aroma of coffee" (TV series; dir. Oleg Turansky)
- 2020 — Sunny Days (TV series; dir. Alexey Morozov)
- 2020 — "Two over the abyss" (TV series; dir. Roman Polyansky)
- 2021 — "Secret Love 2" (Ukraine) or "Test 2" (Russia) (TV series; dir. Anatoly Grigoriev) - Svetlana
- 2021 — "Captured by the Past" (TV series; dir. Alexander Mokhov)
- 2021 — "Seals" (TV series; dir. Dmitry Petrun) - in production

== Awards ==
Year	Name	Nomination	Work	Result
2002	Person of the year	Child of the year		Won
2013	Favorites of Success	Young Talent of the Year		Won
2017	Real Premium MusicBox	Creative of the Year	«I want bass»	Nominated
2019	Music platform	Song of the year	«VOVA»	Won
2020	Music platform	Song of the year	«Naked King»	Won
2021	Ukrainian song of the year	Hope of the Ukrainian song	«Rushnychok»	Won
