= TIK (band) =

Ukrainian rock band

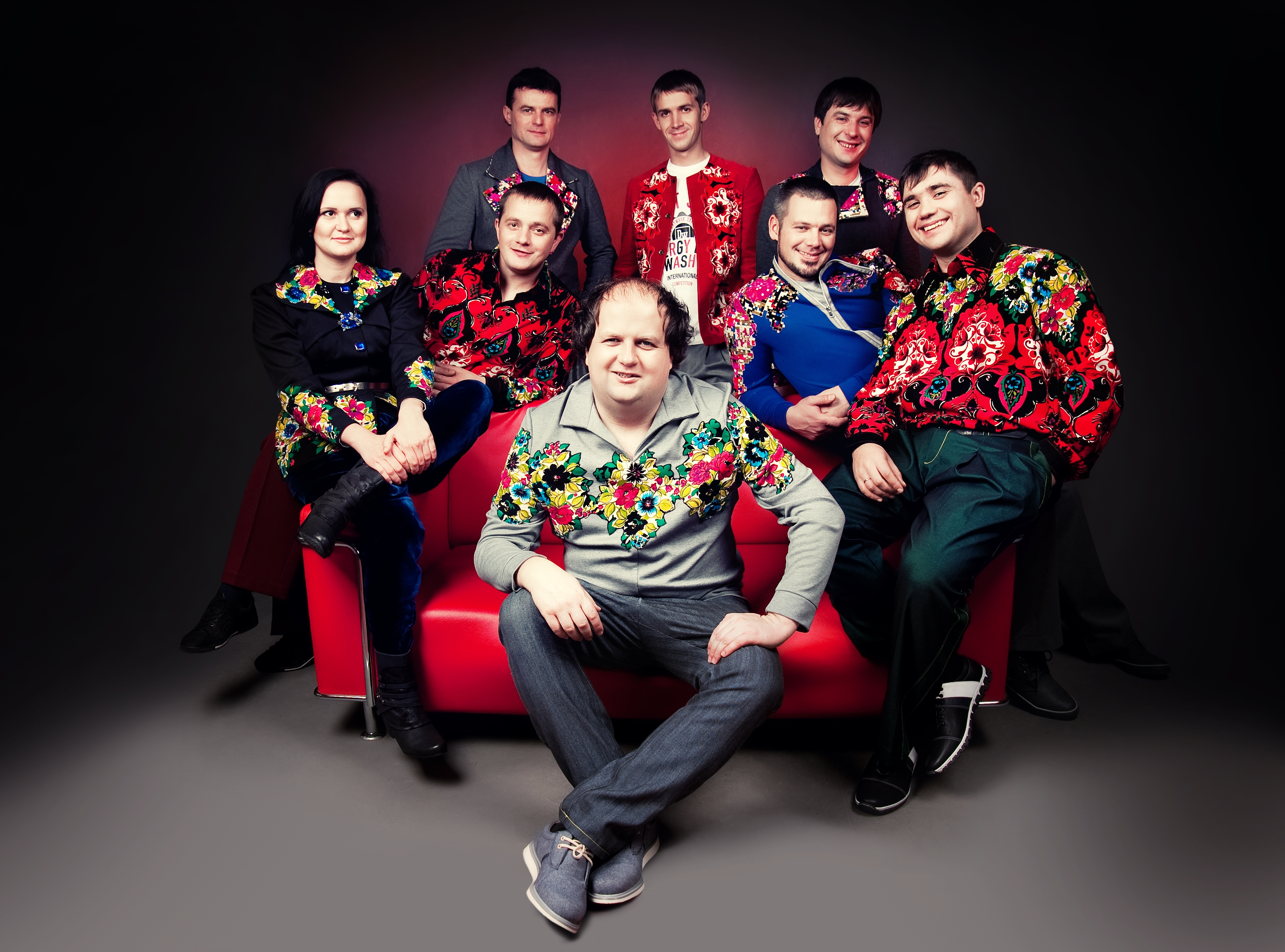
- TIK Band

Background information
- Origin: Vinnytsia, Ukraine
- Genres: Folk rock; ska; punk-rock; folk-punk
- Years active: 2005 – present
- Labels: Moon
- Members: Viktor Broniuk; Oleksandr Pinchuk; Oleksiy Limanets; Yan Nikitchuk; Oleksandr Filinkov; Yevhen Zykov; Serhiy Shamray
- Past members: Denys Repey; Kostiantyn Terepa; Yuriy Martsyniuk; Serhiy Oliynyk; Serhiy Fedchyshyn
- Website: www.tikmusic.com.ua

TIK (Ukrainian: ТІК) is a Ukrainian folk rock band with heavy influences of ska. It was formed in 2005 in Vinnytsia, Ukraine. The band's name is an abbreviation of the Ukrainian phrase "Тверезість і культура" which means "Sobriety and Culture".

== History ==
TIK can trace its origin in 2000 when the history student Viktor Broniuk (vocals, accordion) and the music student Denys Repey (bass guitar) in Vinnytsia decided to form a band that they called TIK from the Ukrainian phrase "Тверезість і культура". In 2003 they were joined by the guitarist Kostiantyn Terepa and the drummer Oleksandr Filinkov.

The band made their first real public appearance at a concert in Vinnytsia on June 2, 2005, and that date is considered to be the birthday of the band. In the autumn of 2005 the band was joined by Yuriy Martsyniuk (keyboards and saxophone) and shortly after that the band recorded its first demo tape.

In 2006 the guitarist Kostiantyn Tegera left the band and was replaced by Serhiy Oliynyk. But later also Denys Repey and Yuriy Martsyniuk left the band. In May 2006 Serhiy Fedchyshyn (bass guitar), Yevhen Zykov (keyboards) and Yan Nikitchuk (trumpet) joined the band.

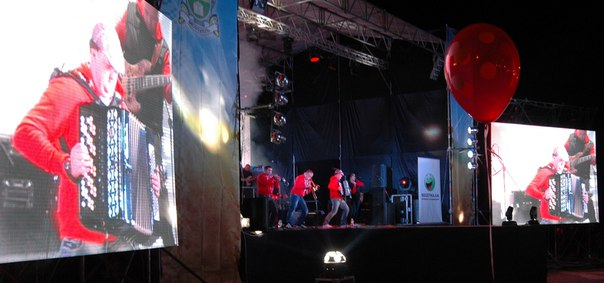
TiK performing in Melitopol, 2013

In late May 2006 the band started to record their first album. One of the first songs that was recorded was "Oleni" (Deers) which they recorded together with the Belarusian band Lyapis Trubetskoy. A music video was recorded during the autumn and "Oleni" made its first appearance on Ukrainian TV in late November 2006. It was soon followed by another music video called "Vchytelka" (Teacher). The album with eleven songs was called "LiteraDura" and was released on May 27, 2007.

A second album called "TyKHYI" was released on September 25, 2008. All songs are written by the band except for a cover of the 1980s Soviet hit "Bielyje Rozy", but it is heavily rearranged by the band and also translated to Ukrainian; "Bili Troiandy".

== Current members ==
- Viktor Broniuk – vocals, accordion
- Oleksandr Pinchuk – guitar
- Oleksiy Limanets – bass guitar
- Oleksandr Filinkov – drums
- Yevhen Zykov – keyboards
- Yan Nikitchuk – trumpet
- Serhiy Shamray – trombone

== Discography ==
- 2007 – LiteraDura (Ukrainian: ЛітераDyра)
- 2008 – TyKHYI (Ukrainian: ТиХИЙ)
- 2011 – Vesilnyi (Ukrainian: Весільний)
- 2015 – Liuby ty Ukrayinu! (Ukrainian: Люби Ти Україну!)
