= Lyubov. Yad =

Studio album by Irina Bilyk
- Released: 7 July 2004
- Recorded: 2003–2004
- Venue: Kyiv, Ukraine
- Studio: Mamamusic Studio; Radio Apelsin Studio; Angel Studio
- Genre: Pop
- Length: 59:37
- Language: Russian
- Label: Mamamusic; Astra Records
- Producer: Irina Bilyk; Yury Nikitin

Irina Bilyk chronology
Kraina (2003)	Lyubov. Yad (2004)	Na bis (2008)

Singles from Lyubov. Yad
- 1. "Sneg" Released: October 2003; 2. "Pomnit" Released: December 2003; 3. "Lyubov. Yad" Released: July 2004; 4. "Yesli ty khochesh" Released: November 2004; 5. "O lyubvi" Released: January 2005

Lyubov. Yad (Russian: Любовь. Яд; transl. Love. Poison) is the ninth studio album and the first Russian-language album by Ukrainian singer Irina Bilyk released on 7 July 2004 by Mamamusic and Astra Records.

== Overview ==
This was the first Russian-language album in Bilyk's career, before that she released only Ukrainian-language material, and in 2003 she released an album Biłyk in Polish.

A team of authors led by Bilyk worked on the album. She was involved in writing or producing almost every song on the album. Artur Zheleznyak, Sergey Dotsenko, Vitaly Kurovsky and Ruslan Kvinta also participated in writing music and lyrics. The album included a song "Ty - na sever, ya - na yug" that was recorded as a duet with Verka Serduchka and which was previously released on her album Chita Drita (2003).

Several music videos were released before the album's release: "Sneg" (directed by Alan Badoev), "Pomnit" and "Lyubov. Yad" (both directed by Alexander and Igor Stekolenko). They appeared as bonus on the CD release of the album.

Lyubov. Yad was released on 7 July 2004. The number of pre-orders exceeded 53,000 copies, and sales in the first two weeks exceeded 100,000. The album was able to receive platinum certification in Ukraine. The album was also released in Russia. According to Irina Bilyk, representatives of the largest Russian radio station Russkoye Radio (and its holding Russian Mediagroup) refused to promote the album in the country.

For the first time since 1995, Bilyk did not go on an all-Ukrainian concert tour in support of the new album.

Russian singer Filipp Kirkorov covered and popularized the cong "Sneg" in 2011. It reached top-40 in Russian music chart and received Golden Gramophone. Kirkorov also performed this song in duo with Bilyk on different shows.

In 2012, this album was nominated for the Ukrainian music award YUNA for Best album of twenty years and the song "Sneg" for Best song of twenty years. In 2020, the song "Sneg" was included in the list "20 iconic songs for 20 years" by YUNA.

== Track listing ==
No.	Title	Lyrics	Music	Producer(s)	Length
1.	"O lyubvi"	Artur Zheleznyak	Zheleznyak	Irina Bilyk; Yurii Nikitin	3:26
2.	"Pomnit"	Bilyk; Zheleznyak	Zheleznyak	Bilyk; Nikitin	3:44
3.	"Ne takaya, kak vse"	Zheleznyak	Zheleznyak	Bilyk; Nikitin	3:36
4.	"Shutka"	Bilyk	Sergey Dotsenko	Bilyk; Nikitin	3:13
5.	"Sneg"	Bilyk	Bilyk	Bilyk; Nikitin	3:47
6.	"Lyubov. Yad"	Vitaly Kurovsky	Ruslan Kvinta	Bilyk; Nikitin	3:47
7.	"Yesli ty khochesh"	Zheleznyak	Zheleznyak	Bilyk; Nikitin	3:54
8.	"Kiyev-Leningrad"	Zheleznyak	Zheleznyak	Bilyk; Nikitin	3:26
9.	"Luchiki"	Bilyk	Bilyk	Bilyk; Nikitin	3:51
10.	"15 shagov"	Zheleznyak	Zheleznyak	Bilyk; Nikitin	4:01
11.	"Lyubov - eto"	Bilyk	Bilyk; Dotsenko	Bilyk; Nikitin	3:38
12.	"Ty - na sever, ya - na yug" (duet with Verka Serduchka)	Bilyk	Bilyk	Bilyk; Nikitin	3:12

Bonus
No.	Title	Lyrics	Music	Producer(s)	Length
13.	"Vverkh po reke" (Soundtrack)	Bilyk	Bilyk	Bilyk; Nikitin	4:11
Total length:					47:46

Video
No.	Title	Director(s)	Length
1.	"Lyubov. Yad"	Alexander and Igor Stekolenko	3:44
2.	"Sneg"	Alan Badoev	4:19
3.	"Pomnit"	Alexander and Igor Stekolenko	3:48
Total length:			11:51

== Personnel ==
Musicians

- Irina Bilyk – lead vocals (all tracks), songwriting (2, 4, 5, 9, 11–13), production (all tracks)
- Andrey Danilko – lead vocals (12)
- Artur Zheleznyak – songwriting (1–3, 7, 8, 10)
- Sergey Dotsenko – songwriting (4, 11), background vocals (2, 4, 7, 11), keyboards (4, 7, 11, 13), guitar (4, 7, 11, 13)
- Vitaly Kurovsky – songwriting (6)
- Ruslan Kvinta – songwriting (6), keyboards (6)
- Yury Nikitin – production (all tracks)
- Gennady Krupnik – background vocals (12), keyboards (1, 3, 5, 12)
- Tatyana Lukanova – background vocals (4, 7–9, 11)
- Students of Lyceum No. 195 – background vocals
- Sergey Mishchenko – keyboards (5)
- Gennady Dyakonov – keyboards (2, 8, 10), guitar (2, 8, 10)
- Yegor Olesov – keyboards (9)
- Sergey Dobrovolsky – guitar (1, 3, 11, 12)
- Oleg Makarevich – guitar (6)
- Ivan Lokhmanyuk – bass guitar (9)
- Oleg Fedosov – drums (9)
- Roman Soluk – brass (13)
- Dmitry Glushchenko – cello (5)
- Sergey Kazakov – cello (13)
- Maria Kapshuchenko – violin (9)
- Yulia Rabishchuk – violin (9)
- Senyon Lebedev – viola (9)

Technical

- Gennady Krupnik – arrangement (1, 3, 5, 12), programming (1, 3, 5, 12)
- Ruslan Kvinta – arrangement (6), programming (6)
- Gennady Dyakonov – arrangement (2, 8, 10), programming (2, 8, 10)
- Sergey Dotsenko – arrangement (4, 7, 11, 13), programming (4, 7, 11, 13)
- Yegor Olesov – arrangement (9), programming (9)
- Sergey Dobrovolsky – recording (1–8, 9–13), mixing (1–8, 9–13)
- Oleg Stepanenkov – recording (6), mixing (6)
- Igor Prigorovsky – recording (9), mixing (9)

Studios

- Mamamusic Studio (2003–2004, Kyiv, Ukraine) – recording (1–8, 9–13), mixing (1–8, 9–13), mastering (all tracks)
- Radio Apelsin Studio (2004, Kyiv, Ukraine) – recording (6), mixing (6)
- Angel Studio (2004, Kyiv, Ukraine) – recording (9), mixing (9)

Management and marketing

- Yury Nikitin / Nova Management – management, executive production
- Tatyana Krupnik – project management
- Taras Malyarevich – photography

== Charts ==
Singles
Year	Title
2003	"Sneg"
2003	"Pomnit"
2004	"Lyubov. Yad"
2004	"Yesli ty khochesh"
2005	"O lyubvi"

== Sales and certifications ==
Region	Certification
Ukraine (IFPI)	Platinum
