= Dmytro Dikusar =

Dmytro Petrovych Dikusar (October 24, 1985, Odesa, Ukrainian SSR, Soviet Union) is a Ukrainian dancer and choreographer.

== Biography ==
Dikusar was born on October 24, 1985, in Odesa. He started dancing at the age of 6, first ballroom, and later sports.

He received a higher education at the Kyiv Institute of Physical Education, and, in 2008, he received a diploma as a ballroom dance trainer. Dikusar has participated in Ukrainian and international sports dance competitions for many years. He achieved the greatest success in Latin American dances - he made it to the finals of the European Cup, and was also the winner of the World Championship in this dance genre.

In 2006, Dikusar received the title of candidate for master of sports in ballroom dancing. He repeatedly reached the finals of international competitions and the championship of Ukraine.

He gained popularity in the media in 2007 after participating in the second season of the project "Dancing with the Stars" on the TV channel "1+1". He danced with the singer Iryna Bilyk. Subsequently, they began their relationship, and soon they played a wedding, holding a solemn ceremony in Rio de Janeiro. However, in 2010, the couple broke up.

In 2011, he took part in the Russian "Dancing with the Stars". Subsequently, he also worked with the Georgian version of this show.

In 2012, Dikusar began a relationship with dancer Olena Shoptenko, whom he also met on Dancing with the Stars. In 2013, the couple got married. But even this marriage did not last long — in 2016, the couple divorced.

In 2019, he returned to the show Dancing with the Stars. In the sixth, seventh and eighth seasons, he danced in pairs with Victoria Bulitko, Slava Kaminska and Olga Harlan, respectively.

In 2022, he joined the ranks of the Armed Forces to defend Ukraine during the Russian invasion
