= Iryna Bilyk =

Ukrainian singer (born 1970)

Iryna Bilyk Ірина Білик PAU
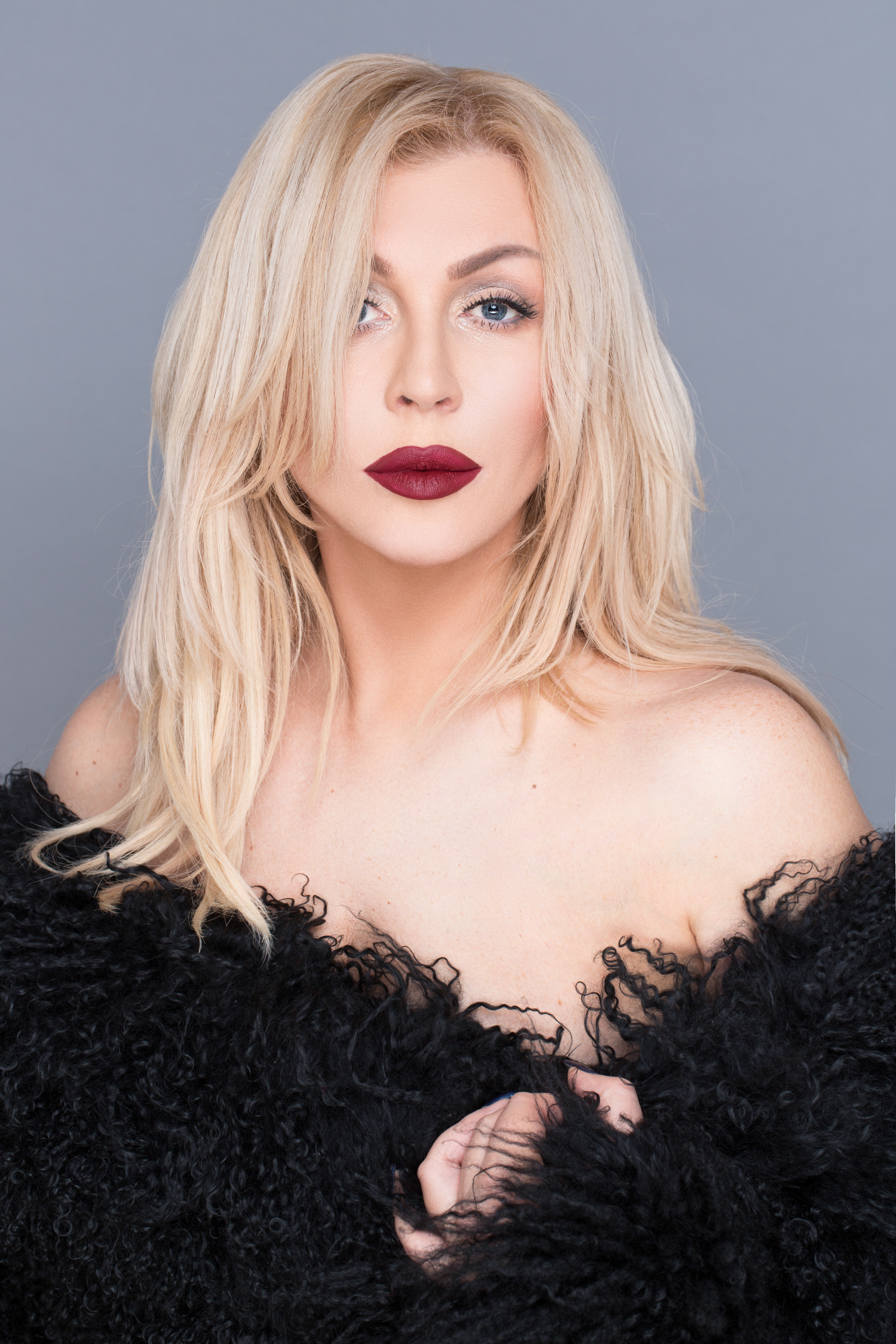

Background information
- Born: Iryna Mykolayivna Bilyk; April 6, 1970 (age 56); Kyiv, Ukrainian SSR, Soviet Union
- Genre: Pop
- Occupations: Singer, songwriter
- Instruments: Vocal, piano
- Years active: 1976–present
- Label: mamamusic
- Website: irinabilyk.com

Iryna Mykolayivna Bilyk (Ukrainian: Ірина Миколаївна Білик, born 6 April 1970 in Kyiv) is a Ukrainian singer-songwriter, holder of the Order of Princess Olga of the 3rd class, Merited (1996) and People's Artist of Ukraine (2008). With a repertoire of songs in Ukrainian, Russian and Polish, Bilyk practically reached the top of the Ukrainian show business in the 2000s. She is often called the "Ukrainian Madonna" due to many of her songs becoming hits in the 1990s, frequent style changes and influence on the Ukrainian musical media scene. YUNA considered Bilyk "the best singer of the two decades" in 2012.

== Early life and education ==
Iryna Bilyk was born on 6 April 1970 in Kyiv, Ukrainian SSR. Her parents were engineers who worked at an aircraft factory. Bilyk has a younger brother, Serhiy.

From the age of five, Bilyk was engaged in dancing and classical ballet. At the age of six, she started singing in the children's song ensemble "Sonechko". Bilyk toured the USSR with the ensemble and appeared on central television for the first time. She wrote her first song at the age of ten.

After graduating from the music school, Bilyk worked as a music teacher.

== Musical career ==
=== 1989–1992: Career beginnings, Chervona Ruta debut and Kuvala Zozulya ===
In 1989, Bilyk participated in the Chervona Ruta Ukrainian music festival. A year later, she performed at another music festival Spring Hopes, where she met musicians like Yuri Nikitin, Georgy Uchaykin and Jean Bolotov. Together they formed the group "Tsey Dosh nadovgo", releasing their first album Kuvala Zozulya in 1990.

In 1992, Bilyk made her first music video for the song "Lyshe Tvoya" and became the laureate of the international festival "Song Vernissage. The new Ukrainian wave". In 1993, she graduated from the Glier State Music College, where she studied at the pop and vocal study department. The following year, she took part in such festivals as "Maria" and "Slavianski Bazaar", where she performed the song "Nova". Later, the members of the group "Tsey Dosh nadovgo", having come under the management of Iryna Bilyk, established the production agency "Nova". Then they worked on the next album Ya roskazhu, which was eventually released in 1994.

=== 1993–1998: Rise to fame and touring, Ya roskazhu, Tak Prosto and Farby ===
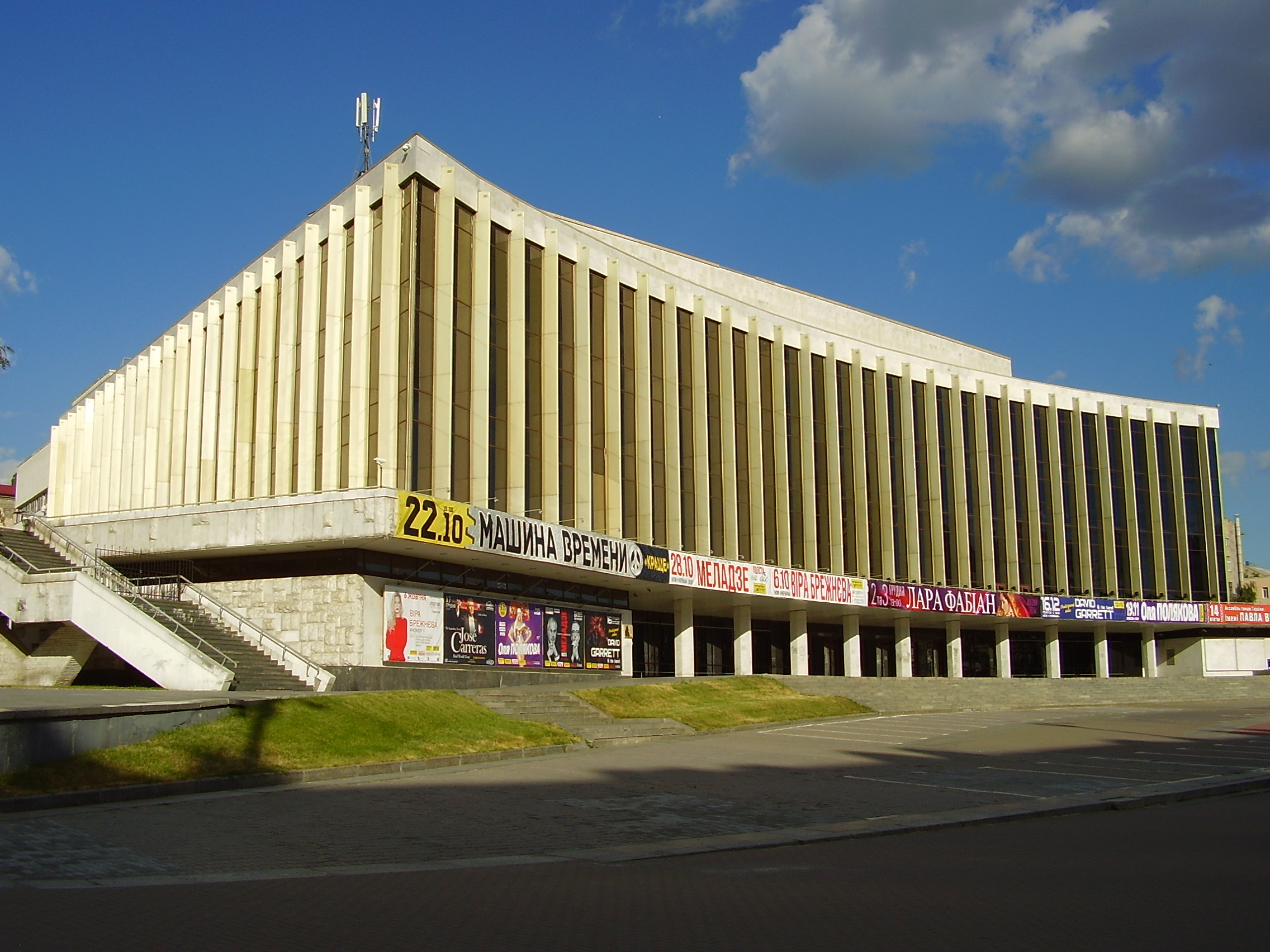
Palace "Ukraine", where Iryna Bilyk gave multiple sold-out concerts

Bilyk embarked on the "Nova" tour in 1995. She gave her first solo show in the "Ukraine" Palace in Kyiv, tickets for which were fully sold-out. In the same year, according to the statistics of the American embassy in Ukraine, Iryna Bilyk became the most popular singer in the country, with journalists of "Mystetsky tops rock-95" coming to the same conclusion by a survey. Bilyk performed for the United States President Bill Clinton in 1995 as the most popular Ukrainian singer of that time.

President Leonid Kravchuk honoured Iryna Bilyk as the Merited Artist of Ukraine in 1996. Then she took part in another festival "Tavriyskie igry", where she received the "Zolota Zharptytsya" award in the field of contemporary Ukrainian music and mass entertainment in the nomination of "The Singer of the Year" and "The Song of the Year". A year later, Bilyk received the Grand Prix of the “Hit-Parade Parade” festival, from which point onward people began considering Bilyk as the "Ukrainian Madonna".

The following year in 1997, Bilyk’s second all-Ukrainian concert tour "Tak Prosto" took place. Iryna gave 38 concerts in the largest cities of the country. This time her performances in the Palace "Ukraine" were sold out in 2 days, and "Zolota Zharptytsya" nominated the tour as "Event of the Year" in the field of modern Ukrainian music and mass entertainment. Bilyk received two further awards: "The Singer of the Year" and "The Album of the Year" for Tak Prosto album. Her next album Farby was also released in 1997, selling over a million copies in Ukraine.

For the third tour named "Farbg Nevba" in 1998, Bilyk grouped together with singers Linda and Maxim Fadeev and performed in stadiums and sport palaces. Despite ambitious plans and the desire to get sold-out concerts in each city, the tour did not go as smoothly as expected, with only 700 tickets being sold for concerts in Lviv and similarly low-ticket sales in Uzhgorod. Bilyk admitted that it was important for her team to see how Moscow-based singers and producers would work. Performances next to a reputable producer and a famous performer became a good advertisement for her, especially since in many cities Bilyk was perceived better than foreign singers.

"Zolota Zharptytsya" once again awarded Iryna Bilyk as "Singer of the Year" in the field of contemporary music and mass entertainment, and awarded her new Farby album as "Album of the Year". Bilyk became the first Ukrainian artist who was able to gather a full audience in the "Ukraine" Palace twice in a row.

=== 1999–2003: OMA, Nova, Biłyk and Bilyk. Kraina ===
Marking the 10th anniversary of Bilyk’s musical career, the collection Krashche: 1988-1998 was released in 1999. On 22 August of the same year, as part of the celebration of Ukraine's Independence Day, Bilyk held a fully sold-out solo concert in London. In the fall, the single "Vybachai" was released, which started a new stage in her career.

Bilyk's colleagues and fans made a lot of remarks about her face, claiming that her eyes looked "sad" and "pleading", with even then-president Leonid Kuchma asking her during a concert why she had "such sad eyes". For this reason, she made her first plastic operation in 1999, correcting eye sockets and drooping eyelids, which has contributed to Bilyk's artist image.

Bilyk released her fifth album OMA in 2000, after which she gave two sold-out concerts in the Palace "Ukraine". Then she released her own clothing collection under the same name, making her debut as a fashion designer. In fall of the same year, she gave a "Bez Nazvy" tour, performing in the western part of Ukraine and giving concerts in the UK, Germany, Canada, USA and Russia.

Having practically reached the top of the Ukrainian show business; Bilyk began to look for opportunities to enter the foreign music market. In 2002, after mastering Polish pronunciation she released Biłyk, an album mostly sung in Polish. All songs from the album were originally written in Ukrainian, then translated into Polish. Particularly the song "Droga" had a music video starring a famous Polish actor Cezary Pazura. It became the recipient of the "Pochesny Yakh" award in the "Discovery of the Year" nomination at the Polish "Yach Film" festival; however, it did not receive significant attention on the Polish market. The next year Bilyk followed with the Bilyk. Kraina album in Ukrainian, again giving multiple fully sold-out concerts.

=== 2004–2013: Singing in Russian, Lubov. Yad and Na Bis ===
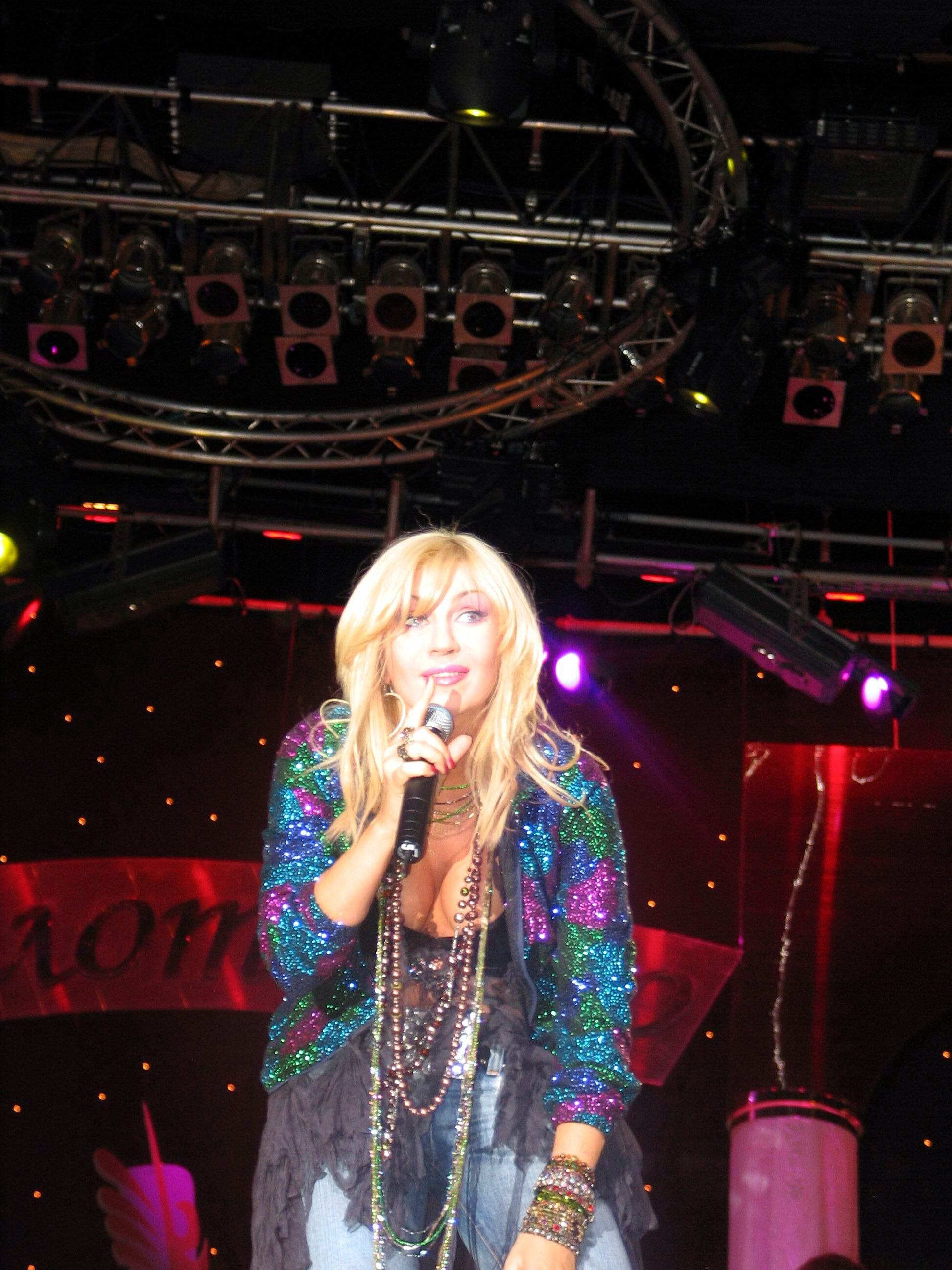
Bilyk performing on the "Zolotoe Pero" ceremony in 2005

Bilyk started writing songs in Russian in 2004, the first track being "Sneg", which was later included in the album Lubov’. Yad, which has sold 100 000 copies in the first 10 days and received the status of "platinum". The music video for "Sneg” became one of the first videos works by the clipmaker Alan Badoev.

According to a Ukrainian poet, Konstantin Hnatenko, the birth of Bilyk's first child motivated her to start performing in Russian; as at that time, it was often the only way for artists to secure opportunities, since Ukrainian-language songs were largely disregarded by the industry. "Singing in Russian was a necessity to her rather than a choice", Hnatenko noted.

In 2006, Bilyk released an album for the upcoming charity tour Dopomohty tak lehko, which received the same symbolic name. The tour started in fall and covered 24 cities in Ukraine. More than 250,000 hryvnas were collected during the tour, which were transferred to the "Father's House" Kyiv international charitable foundation. In addition, Bilyk invited thirteen homeless children to participate in her video “Ryabina Alaya”. On the final concerts of the tour in Kyiv, Bilyk invited children from the orphanage to the concerts and shared the stage with them. In the same year, "Showbiz Awards" from the radio station "Hit-FM" nominated Bilyk as the best performer in the category "Singer of the year".

In fall of the same year, Bilyk toured through cities of Ukraine with the concert program called "20 years together". In addition to lyrical compositions and popular songs, Iryna read her personal emotional poems on stage during performances. The tour was a great commercial success, with coming requests for more concerts. Later, Bilyk released a collection of her best hits ''Navsegda'', as well as a music video for the new song "Podaryu tebe". During the New Year period, Bilyk released a new CD ''Na bis!'', which includes 16 compositions.

On the Ukrainian Independence Day on 14 August 2008, then-president Victor Yuschenko honored Iryna Bilyk the title of People's Artist of Ukraine. Having achieved such recognition, Bilyk has claimed that she does not consider success as her personal merit, saying that her fans helped her achieve what she had then.

In 2010, Bilyk sang in a duet with her longtime friend Olga Gorbacheva, and a music video was also shot with the participation of Jean-Claude Van Damme, which premiered at the "Viva-2010" ceremony. In summer, the song "Dvi ridni dushi" was released – a Ukrainian duet with Sergey Zverev. In fall, they took part in the Ukrainian TV show "Zirka+Zirka", igniting rumours about their romance.

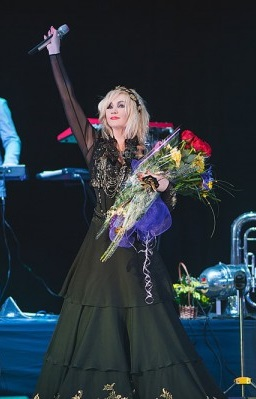
Bilyk in 2013

In the spring of 2013, Bilyk's song "My budem vmeste" became the 8th most downloaded song in Russia. At that time, Bilyk opened a Facebook page, which accumulated 40,000 followers within a few days.

=== 2014–2021: Rassvet and Bez Grima ===
In 2014, Bilyk's song "Taxi" became a hit and took the first place in Ukrainian charts for six months. The same year, Iryna wrote a duet with Boris Moiseyev for the song "Ne Vazhno" and shot a video with the Azerbaijani photographer Aslan Akhmadov. In July, she visited the "Slavianski Bazaar" contest, where she became a member of the international jury from Ukraine and made her debut in Jūrmala, Latvia. In the summer of the same year, Bilyk announced the termination of cooperation with producer Yuri Nikitin and announced her new album Zarya at the same time. The presentation of another new album Rassvet took place in September, at 6:30 am on the roof of a hotel in the center of Kyiv.

A music video for the song "Krichi" from the album Rassvet was released in the spring of 2015. Iryna also took part in a concert in memory of Kuzma Skryabin, performing their joint hit "Movchaty" with Sviatoslav Vakarchuk. In the summer of the same year, Bilyk gave another big concert in Kyiv, named "Bilyk. Summer. Let's Dance!", where she performed her hits in a completely different sound manner. The concert was also attended by singer Alekseev, who had presented a successful remake of Bilyk's song “A ya plyvu” the day before.

On Bilyk's birthday in 2017, she released the album Bez Grima, which she had been working on since 2006. She claimed that this is an extremely important record for her, and that it is "much more intimate" for her compared to all her previous 11 albums. The album includes the songs “Ne pytai” and “A mne by v nyebo”. The album was also supposed to include the song “Tufli” - a single recorded with a music video in 2006, but was eventually released only in the fall of 2015 - but it is not included in the final version of the album.

Later in February 2018, Bilyk went on a large-scale tour "Bez Grima. The Best. About Love". In the course of two months, she gave 37 concerts in 35 cities of Ukraine, ending the tour with three sold-out concerts at the Kyiv Palace "Ukraine". At the end of the year she presented the music video for "Lenya, Leonid", which filmed in a restaurant in Kyiv. It was criticized by her fans for its "frank chanson-style" sound. At the same time, on the New Year's eve of 2019, Bilyk released two singles "V Novom Godu" in Russian and "Z Novym Rokom, Ukraina!" in Ukrainian. In November 2019, she released the song "Krashnaya pomada", along with the music video for it.

On 6 November 2019, Bilyk announced a double anniversary of her life, fifty years of age and thirty years on the professional stage, which was supposed to take place on the stage of the National Palace of Arts "Ukraine", but due to the COVID-19 pandemic, the show was postponed to 22 May 2021. The President of Ukraine Volodymyr Zelenskyy also attended the concert. On 10 September 2020, a star dedicated to Bilyk was laid on the "Star Square" in Kyiv.

=== 2022–present: return to Ukrainian, "Bez tebe" and "Snih" ===
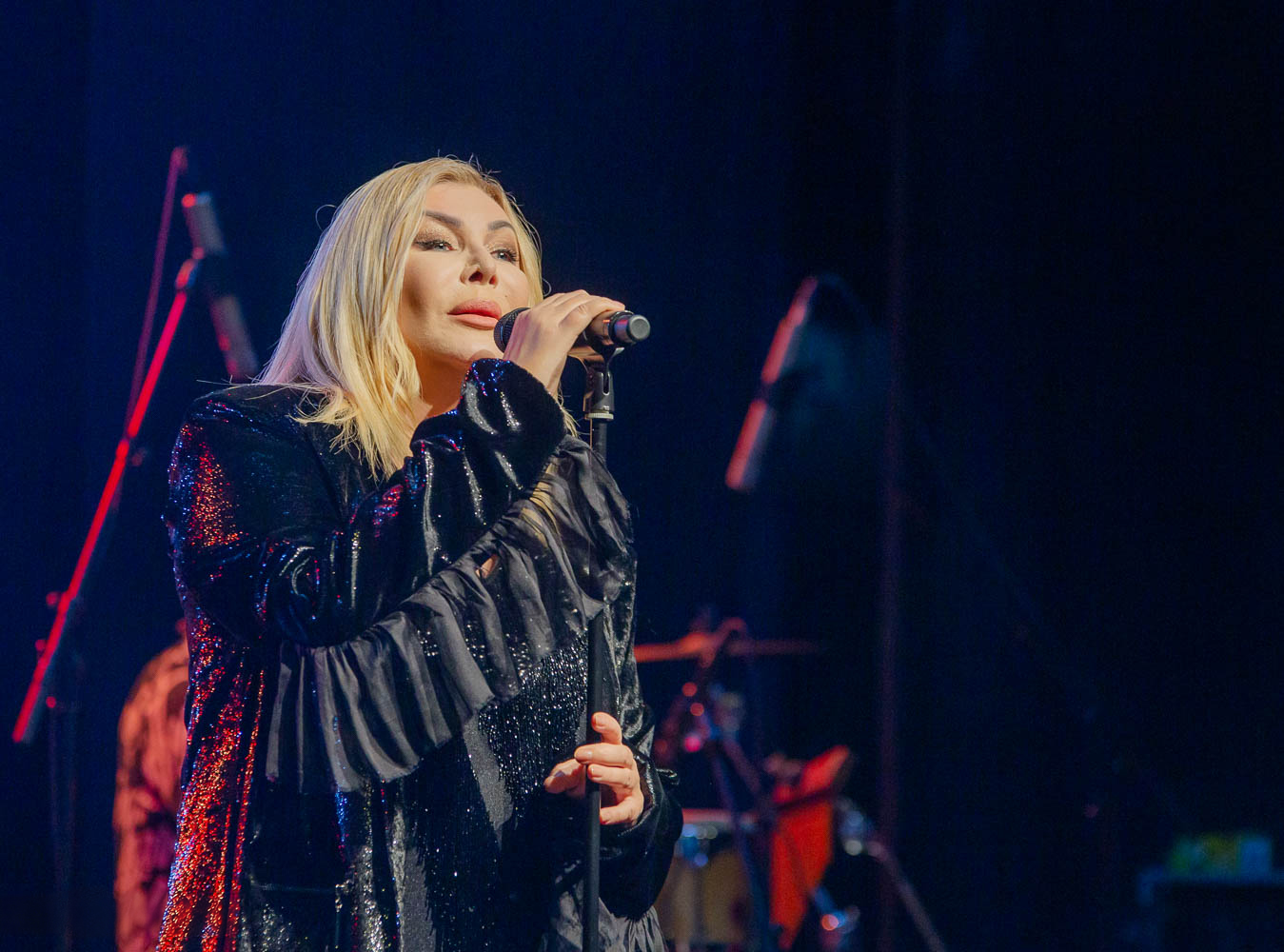
Bilyk in 2022

Following the 2022 Russian invasion of Ukraine, Bilyk has spoken out multiple times condemning the invasion, calling on Russian soldiers to leave Ukrainian soil, and their mothers not to let their sons go to "certain death".

Since the start of the invasion, Bilyk returned to singing in Ukrainian, translating her biggest hits in Russian to Ukrainian, such as "My budem vmeste" to "My budem razom", "Sneg" to "Snih", "Nas net" to "Nas nema" and "Devochka" as "Divchynka" in duet with Masha Kondratenko. In July 2024 she performed at a concert of the Vyava cultural space in Kyiv, singing a duet with Masha Kondratenko and Khrystyna Soloviy.

Bilyk released "Zvite teren" in 2024, a Ukrainian folk song in her performance. On Valentine's Day in 2025 she released a new single "Ochi v ochi" in collaboration with Esphyr. In honor of her 55th birthday, Bilyk went on an all-Ukrainian tour, giving three sold-out concerts in Kyiv.

On 1 June 2025 Bilyk re-released "Tak prosto" in a new dance arrangement. Later on 21 June she released "A dity chekayut'", a song in honor of Ukrainian children waiting for their parents to come back from the war. The music video for it was filmed with Roman Soluk, a soldier of the Armed Forces of Ukraine who is also a sopila player. On 19 December of the same year together with Khrystyna Soloviy Bilyk released a Ukrainian cover and music video for the song "Fransua". Bilyk reportedly gave Khrystyna complete freedom to interpret the song. The music video for it was filmed at the Kyiv restaurant "Vavylon".

== Political activism ==
In 2004, Bilyk took part in "Molod'–proty! Molod'–za!" tour in support of Victor Yanukovych, but in 2009 supported his political rival Yulia Tymoshenko by taking part in "Z Ukrainoyu v serci" tour.

Bilyk supports LGBT rights and released "Ne khovai ochei", a track released on the International Day Against Homophobia, Transphobia and Biphobia, 17 May 2018 for Kyiv Pride-2018, dedicated to people who do not hide their sexual and gender identity.

In 2024, Bilyk recorded a response to Philip Kirkorov, who gave a concert singing her song "Sneg" for the Russian military. She released the response in her Instagram, where she read a poem in Russian to the tune of the song "Sneg", accompanied by footage of the destruction of Ukrainian cities and missile attacks by the Russian army. In the poem, Bilyk emphasized that Kirkorov had "lost his decency", "sold his soul to the devil" by mocking Ukraine and expressed hope that God would punish him.

== Personal life ==
Iryna Bilyk lives in the village of Berezivka of the Bucha Raion. On the first day of the Russian invasion in 2022, Bilyk left her home with her youngest son. During the battle of Kyiv, Russian soldiers lived in her house for almost a month, leaving it looted and damaged.

Iryna Bilyk has two children and was married multiple times:

- 1990–1998: Yuriy Nikitin, her own producer;
- 1998–2002: Andriy Overchuk, with whom she had a child named Hlib Overchuk, (born 18 June 1999), a singer currently residing in Spain;
- 2003–2006: Dmytro Kolyadenko, choreographer and TV-presenter;
- 2007–2010: Dmytro Dikusar;
- 2015–2021: Aslan Akhmadov, Bilyk's only officially registered marriage partner. During the marriage Bilyk gave birth to her second child in 2015 with the help of a surrogate mother.

=== Controversies ===
In August 2015, having violated the procedure for crossing the state border of Ukraine, Bilyk flew from Moscow to Simferopol to attend a friend's wedding in Crimea, which was annexed by Russia in 2014. After that she was included into the "Myrotvorets".

In 2018, activists blocked the entrance to the Lviv Opera for Bilyk on the way to her concert due to her visiting Russian-occupied Crimea illegally by Ukrainian law, allegedly not recognizing Russia as an aggressor and attending Philip Kirkorov's concert in the Kremlin Palace. Before the concert in Lviv, her producer at a press conference showed a video message from ATO fighters, who assured that she helped the military, and emphasized that she has not performed in Russia since 2014, but visiting her husband and son, who reside in Moscow, is her private right.

== Discography ==
=== Albums ===
- Kuvala zozulia (1990)
- Ya rozkazhu (1994)
- Nova (1995)
- Tak prosto (1996)
- Farby (1997)
- OMA (2000)
- Biłyk (2002)
- Kraina (2003)
- Lyubov. Yad (2004)
- Na bis (2008)
- Rassvet (2014)
- Bez grima (2017)

=== Singles ===
- "Tak prosto" (1996)
- "Vybachai" (1999)
- "Krainia" (2001)
- "Anioł?" (2002)
- "Droga" (2002)
- "Movchaty"(feat. Skryabin, 2003)
- "Listya" (2017)
- "Ne pytai" (2018)
- "Ne khovai ochey" (2018)
- "Ne strymui pohliad" (2020)
- "Kordony" (2022)
- "Malo" (2023)
- "Snih" (2023)
- "Ochi v ochi" (feat. Esphyr, 2025)
- "Tak prosto" (2025)
- "A dity chekayut'" (2025)
- "Fransua" (feat. Khrystyna Soloviy, 2025)

=== Compilation ===
- Krasche: 1988-1998 (1998)
- Navsegda (2006)
- Dopomohty tak lehko (2006)
- 50 (2020)

== Awards ==
- Order of Princess Olga, Third Class (2020)
