= Tantsi z zirkamy season 5 =

Tantsi z zirkamy
- Season 5
- Celebrity winner: Natalia Mohylevska
- Professional winner: Ihor Kuzmenko
- No. of episodes: 10

Release
- Original network: 1+1
- Original release: August 27 – October 29, 2017

Season chronology
- ← Previous; Season 4

Tantsi z zirkamy (Танці з зірками), the Ukrainian version of Dancing with the Stars returned for its fifth season in Autumn 2017, following a 10-year hiatus. Unlike season 4, season 5 aired on the show's original network, 1+1.

Following the announcement of the show's comeback, a viral challenge was started by the show's producers to progressively reveal this season's cast. Each nominated celebrity had to post a video to their social media accounts under the hashtag #танціззіркамиchallenge (Dancing with the Stars challenge), either accepting or declining the invitation to participate. The nominated celebrity also had to pass on the challenge by nominating another person.

On July 5, Yuriy Horbunov became the first celebrity to confirm his participation as the host of the show. He nominated the runner-up couple of seasons 1 and 3, Natalia Mohylevska and Vladyslav Yama, who both confirmed their participation in the upcoming season. On August 12, it was announced that Yama would join the judging panel, while Mohylevska would participate in the series as a celebrity contestant. This marked the third time Mohylevska competed on the show, having previously participated in the first season in 2006, followed by an all-stars season in 2007, with a second place finish on both occasions.

The first celebrity to confirm their participation as a contestant was travel show host Dmytro Komarov. Kateryna Kukhar, National Opera of Ukraine ballerina, accepted a position on the judging panel. Following Komarov, the invitation to participate was accepted by Eurovision Song Contest 2017 host Oleksandr Skichko, lead singer of Vremya i Steklo Nadya Dorofeeva, Crimean Tatar actor and movie director Ahtem Seytablayev, TV psychologist Natalia Kholodenko, singer and socialite Kamaliya, singer and TV host Olya Polyakova as well as actor and comedian Yuriy Tkach. On July 16, TV host and singer Volodymyr Dantes became the first celebrity to decline the invitation to compete, while on July 28 singer and dancer Monatik confirmed his participation as a judge. On August 19, singer and The Voice of Ukraine judge Serhiy Babkin became the final celebrity to announce their participation.

During the first live show on August 27, it was announced that each week, Yuriy Horbunov would be joined by a new guest host. Guest hosts for each live show can be found in the table below.

On October 29, actor and director Ahtem Seytablayev and his partner Olena Shoptenko finished in third place, singer Nadya Dorofeeva and her partner Yevhen Kot finished second, while singer Natalia Mohylevska and her partner Ihor Kuzmenko were crowned champions. This marks the first win for Mohylevska, who has finished in second place twice before – in season 1 and season 3. Mohylevska has also made history for being the only celebrity to ever participate in the show three times. In terms of viewer votes, Mohylevska and Kuzmenko had an over 20% lead over runners-up Dorofeeva & Kot.

== Couples ==
Celebrity	Occupation	Professional partner	Status
Oleksandr Skichko	TV host	Anna Palamarchuk	Eliminated 1st on 3 September 2017
Natalia Kholodenko	TV psychologist	Vitaliy Zahoruyko	Eliminated 2nd on 10 September 2017
Olya Polyakova	Singer and TV host	Stepan Misyurka	Eliminated 3rd on 17 September 2017
Kamaliya	Singer and socialite	Dmytro Zhuk	Eliminated 4th on 24 September 2017
Dmytro Komarov	Travel show host	Oleksandra Kucherenko; Olena Shoptenko (week 6)	Withdrew on 8 October 2017
Serhiy Babkin	5'nizza singer	Snizhana Babkina; Oleksandra Kucherenko (week 6)	Eliminated 5th on 15 October 2017
Yuriy Tkach	Actor and comedian	Ilona Hvozdiova; Snizhana Babkina (week 6)	Eliminated 6th on 22 October 2017
Ahtem Seytablayev	Actor and movie director	Olena Shoptenko; Ilona Hvozdiova (week 6)	Third place on 29 October 2017
Nadya Dorofeeva	Vremya i Steklo singer	Yevhen Kot; Ihor Kuzmenko (week 6)	Runner-up on 29 October 2017
Natalia Mohylevska	Singer	Ihor Kuzmenko; Yevhen Kot (week 6)	Winner on 29 October 2017

== Scores ==
Couple	Place	1	2	3	4	5	6	7	8	9	10
Natalia M. & Ihor	1	26	22	29	23	24	27	19	25+29=54	28+30=58	30+30+30=90
Nadya & Yevhen	2	26	22	26	29	25	30	28	23+30=53	29+27=56	30+30+30=90
Ahtem & Olena	3	21	23	22	29	19	24	22	28+24=52	24+29=53	29+30+30=89
Yuriy & Ilona	4	20	24	19	23	26	26	21	26+29=55	28+28=56	
Serhiy & Shizhana	5	28	22	9	18	29	21	29	21+26=47		
Dmytro & Oleksandra	6	13	19	13	13	14	6	20			
Kamaliya & Dmytro	7	16	13	18	18	17					
Olya & Stepan	8	15	23	19	20						
Natalia Kh. & Vitaliy	9	23	17	14							
Oleksandr & Anna	10	20	20								

Red numbers indicate the lowest score for each week.
Green numbers indicate the highest score for each week.
indicates the couple eliminated that week.
indicates the returning couple that finished in the bottom two.
indicates the couple that withdrew.
indicates the couple that was saved from elimination by another couple's withdrawal.
indicates the winning couple.
indicates the runner-up couple.
indicates the couple in third place.

=== Average score chart ===
This table only counts for dances scored on a 30-points scale.

Rank by average	Place	Couple	Total points	Number of dances	Average
1	2	Nadya & Yevhen	385	14	27.5
2	1	Natalia M. & Ihor	372	14	26.6
3	3	Ahtem & Olena	354	14	25.3
4	4	Yuriy & Ilona	270	11	24.5
5	5	Serhiy & Snizhana	203	9	22.6
6	10	Oleksandr & Anna	40	2	20.0
7	8	Olya & Stepan	77	4	19.3
8	9	Natalia Kh. & Vitaliy	54	3	18.0
9	7	Kamaliya & Dmytro	82	5	16.4
10	6	Dmytro & Oleksandra	98	7	14.0

=== Highest and lowest scoring performances ===
The best and worst performances in each dance according to the judges' 30-point scale are as follows:

Dance	Highest scored dancer(s)	Highest score	Lowest scored dancer(s)	Lowest score
Cha-cha-cha	Yuriy Tkach	23	Dmytro Komarov	6
Rumba	Nadya Dorofeeva; Natalia Mohylevska	30	Dmytro Komarov	13
Jive	Oleksandr Skichko	20	–	–
Paso doble	Ahtem Seytablayev	29	Kamaliya	13
Samba	Natalia Mohylevska	19	Dmytro Komarov	13
Salsa	Ahtem Seytablayev	22	Oleksandr Skichko	20
Waltz	Nadya Dorofeeva; Yuriy Tkach	29	Natalia Kholodenko; Olya Polyakova	23
Quickstep	Natalia Mohylevska	25	Serhiy Babkin	9
Tango	Yuriy Tkach	28	Dmytro Komarov	13
Foxtrot	Natalia Mohylevska; Serhiy Babkin	29	Ahtem Seytablayev	19
Viennese Waltz	Dmytro Komarov	14	–	–
Argentine Tango	Natalia Mohylevska	30	Natalia Mohylevska	26
Contemporary	Nadya Dorofeeva; Natalia Mohylevska	30	Kamaliya	17
Jazz and its varieties	Nadya Dorofeeva (Lyrical Jazz)	28	Olya Polyakova (Pop-jazz)	15
Hip-hop	Nadya Dorofeeva	30	Yuriy Tkach; Ahtem Seytablayev	24
Broadway	Serhiy Babkin	29	Yuriy Tkach	20
Modern	Nadya Dorofeeva	30	Yuriy Tkach	19
Disco	Nadya Dorofeeva	30	Yuriy Tkach	26
Rock'n'Roll	Serhiy Babkin	21	–	–
Swing	Ahtem Seytablayev	24	–	–
Street dance	Yuriy Tkach	28	–	–
Fusion	Ahtem Seytablayev	30	Nadya Dorofeeva	27
Freestyle	Natalia Mohylevska; Ahtem Seytablayev	30	Natalia Mohylevska	22

=== Couples' highest and lowest scoring dances ===
Scores are based upon a potential 30-point maximum.

Couples	Highest scoring dance(s)	Lowest scoring dance(s)
Natalia M. & Ihor	Freestyle, Argentine Tango, Contemporary & Rumba (30)	Samba (19)
Nadya & Yevhen	Contemporary, Disco, Hip-hop, Rumba & Modern (30)	Rumba (22)
Ahtem & Olena	Fusion & Freestyle (30)	Foxtrot (19)
Yuriy & Ilona	Waltz (29)	Modern (19)
Serhiy & Snizhana	Broadway & Foxtrot (29)	Quickstep (9)
Dmytro & Oleksandra	Paso Doble (20)	Cha-cha-cha (6)
Kamaliya & Dmytro	Rumba & Jazz (18)	Paso Doble (13)
Olya & Stepan	Waltz (23)	Pop-jazz (15)
Natalia Kh. & Vitaliy	Waltz (23)	Paso Doble (14)
Oleksandr & Anna	Jive & Salsa (20)	Jive & Salsa (20)

== Weekly scores and songs ==
Unless indicated otherwise, individual judges scores in the charts below (given in parentheses) are listed in this order from left to right: Monatik, Kateryna Kukhar, Vladyslav Yama.
The flower sign indicates the couple received a flower from Kateryna Kukhar.

=== Week 1: Premiere ===
Running order

Couple	Dance	Song	Score			Total
Couple	Dance	Song	Monatik	Katerina	Vlad	Total
Ahtem & Olena	Paso Doble	"Run Boy Run" – Woodkid	8	7	6	21
Nadya & Yevhen	Hip-hop	"SexyBack" – Justin Timberlake	9	9	8	26
Yuriy & Ilona	Broadway	"Ya i Sara" – DZIDZIO	7	6	7	20
Olya & Stepan	Pop-jazz	"Anaconda" – Nicki Minaj	8	2	5	15
Dmytro & Oleksandra	Rumba	"Vyshche neba" – Okean Elzy	6	3	4	13
Natalia M. & Ihor	Argentine Tango	"Por una Cabeza" – Carlos Gardel	10	8	8	26
Oleksandr & Anna	Jive	"I Got You (I Feel Good)" – James Brown	8	7	5	20
Natalia Kh. & Vitaliy	Waltz	"Try" – Pink	8	8	7	23
Kamaliya & Dmytro	Samba	"Balada" – Gusttavo Lima	7	5	4	16
Serhiy & Snizhana	Contemporary	"Iron Sky" – Paolo Nutini	10	9	9	28

=== Week 2 ===
Running order

Couple	Dance	Song	Score			Total	Result
Couple	Dance	Song	Monatik	Katerina	Vlad	Total	Result
Serhiy & Snizhana	Tango	"Ya polyubila Vas" – Zemfira	9	7	6	22	Safe
Yuriy & Ilona	Hip-hop	"Tayet led" – Griby	8	8	8	24	Safe
Nadya & Yevhen	Rumba	"Diamonds" – Rihanna	9	7	6	22	Safe
Dmytro & Oleksandra (flower)	Jazz	"Umbrella" – The Baseballs	7	8	4	19	Safe
Natalia M. & Ihor	Freestyle	"Candy Shop" – 50 Cent	9	7	6	22	Safe
Oleksandr & Anna	Salsa	"Adrenalin" – Okean Elzy	8	7	5	20	Eliminated
Kamaliya & Dmytro	Paso Doble	"Make-Up" – The Hardkiss	7	3	3	13	Safe
Olya & Stepan	Waltz	"Kiss from a Rose" – Seal	8	9	6	23	Safe
Natalia Kh. & Vitaliy	Cha-cha-cha	"Goodbye" – Feder feat. Lyse	7	7	3	17	Bottom two
Ahtem & Olena	Contemporary	"Zaplutalas" – Jamala	9	6	8	23	Safe

Judges' votes to save

- Monatik: Oleksandr & Anna
- Kukhar: Natalia Kh. & Vitaliy
- Yama: Natalia Kh. & Vitaliy

=== Week 3: Evening of Love ===
Running order

Couple	Score	Dance	Music	Result
Ahtem & Olena	22 (8,7,7)	Salsa	"Shape of You" – Ed Sheeran	Safe
Yuriy & Ilona	19 (7,6,6)	Modern	"Wicked Game" – Chris Isaak	Safe
Nadya & Yevhen	26 (9,8,9)	Tango	"Znayesh" – Rozhden	Safe
Serhiy & Shizhana (Note: Due to previous arrangements, Babkin was unable to perform live during the show; dress rehearsal footage was screened instead.)	9 (3,3,3)	Quickstep	"Crazy in Love" – Beyoncé	Safe
Natalia Kh. & Vitaliy	14 (6,4,4)	Paso Doble	"Hutsulka Ksenia" – Yarolsav Barnych	Eliminated
Olya & Stepan	19 (8,6,5)	Cha-cha-cha	"Sex Bomb" – Tom Jones	Bottom two
Kamaliya & Dmytro	18 (8,4,6)	Rumba	"Un-Break My Heart" – Toni Braxton	Safe
Natalia M. & Ihor (flower)	29 (10,10,9)	Foxtrot	"Spy sobi sama" – Skryabin	Safe
Dmytro & Oleksandra	13 (5,3,5)	Samba	"Waka Waka" – Shakira	Safe

=== Week 4: Made in Ukraine ===
Running order

Couple	Score	Dance	Music	Result
Serhiy & Shizhana	18 (7,5,6)	Rumba	"Oy, ne khody, Hrutsyu" – Marusia Churai	Bottom two
Yuriy & Ilona	23 (8,7,8)	Cha-cha-cha	"Hop Hop Hop" – Verka Serduchka	Safe
Olya & Stepan	20 (8,7,5)	Contemporary	"Misyats" – Natalia Mohylevska	Eliminated
Dmytro & Oleksandra	13 (5,4,4)	Tango	"911" – Okean Elzy	Safe
Nadya & Yevhen	29 (10,10,9)	Waltz	"Trymay" – Khrystyna Soloviy	Safe
Kamaliya & Dmytro	18 (7,5,6)	Jazz	"Vykhodnoy" – Monatik	Safe
Ahtem & Olena (flower)	29 (10,10,9)	Freestyle	"Lyudy" – BoomBox	Safe
Natalia M. & Ihor	23 (9,7,7)	Paso Doble	"Vesna" – Vopli Vidopliassova	Safe

Judges' votes to save

- Monatik: Serhiy & Shizhana
- Kukhar: Olya & Stepan
- Yama: Serhiy & Shizhana

=== Week 5: Movie Night ===
Running order

Couple	Score	Dance	Music	Characters (Movie)	Result
Yuriy & Ilona	26 (9,8,9)	Disco	"Stayin' Alive" – Bee Gees	Gru & Lucy (Despicable Me 2)	Safe
Ahtem & Olena	19 (7,6,6)	Foxtrot	"Verbovaya Doshchechka" – Myroslav Skoryk	Ivan & Palahna (Shadows of Forgotten Ancestors)	Safe
Kamaliya & Dmytro	17 (7,5,5)	Contemporary	"My Heart Will Go On" – Celine Dion	Rose & Jack (Titanic)	Eliminated
Serhiy & Shizhana (flower)	29 (10,10,9)	Broadway	"Sing Sing Sing" – The Andrews Sisters	Daphne & Osgood (Some Like It Hot)	Safe
Natalia M. & Ihor	24 (9,7,8)	Waltz	"I Will Always Love You" – Dolly Parton	Rachel & Frank (The Bodyguard)	Safe
Nadya & Yevhen	25 (10,8,7)	Paso Doble	"Iron" – Woodkid	Daenerys & Jon (Game of Thrones)	Bottom two
Dmytro & Oleksandra	14 (6,4,4)	Viennese Waltz	"Hijo de la Luna" – Mecano	Tin Man & Dorothy (The Wizard of Oz)	Safe

=== Week 6: Cultural Dances ===
Running order

Couple	Score	Dance	Music	Result
Ahtem & Ilona	24 (8,8,8)	Quickstep	"The Rich Man's Frug" – Bob Fosse	Bottom two
Yuriy & Shizhana (flower)	26 (9,10,7)	Freestyle	"Jogi" – Panjabi MC	Safe
Serhiy & Oleksandra	21 (8,6,7)	Paso Doble	"What Kind of Man" – Florence and the Machine	Bottom two
Nadya & Ihor	30 (10,10,10)	Contemporary	"Probach" – Serhiy Babkin	Safe
Natalia M. & Yevhen	27 (9,9,9)	Jazz-Funk	"Mokraya" – Quest Pistols Show feat. Monatik	Safe
Dmytro & Olena	6 (2,2,2)	Cha-cha-cha	"Big in Japan" – Alphaville	Safe

=== Week 7: Retro Circus ===
Running order

Couple	Score	Dance	Music	Result
Yuriy & Ilona	21 (8,6,7)	Salsa	"Ty meni ne dayesh" – Andriy Kuzmenko & Natalia Mohylevska	Safe (Eliminated)
Ahtem & Olena	22 (8,7,7)	Tango	"Runnin'" – Beyoncé	Safe
Natalia M. & Ihor	19 (8,6,5)	Samba	"Luis Fonsi" – Luis Fonsi	Safe
Nadya & Yevhen (flower)	28 (10,9,9)	Jazz	"Zhyt v tvoyey golove" – Zemfira	Safe
Dmytro & Oleksandra	20 (6,10,4)	Paso Doble	"Caravan Twist" – Bill Haley & His Comets	Withdrew (Safe)
Serhiy & Shizhana	29 (10,10,9)	Foxtrot	"Obiymy" – Okean Elzy	Bottom two

Judges' votes to save

- Monatik: Serhiy & Shizhana
- Kukhar: Yuriy & Ilona
- Yama: Serhiy & Shizhana

== Dance chart ==
The celebrities and professional partners danced one of these routines for each corresponding week:

- Week 1 (Season Premiere): Samba, Waltz, Rumba, Paso Doble, Argentine Tango, Jive, Broadway, Contemporary, Pop-jazz or Hip-hop
- Week 2: One unlearned dance (introducing Tango, Jazz, Freestyle, Salsa and Cha-cha-cha)
- Week 3 (Evening of Love): One unlearned dance (introducing Quickstep, Foxtrot and Modern)
- Week 4 (Made in Ukraine): One unlearned dance
- Week 5 (Cinema Evening): One unlearned dance (introducing Viennese Waltz and Disco)
- Week 6 (Switch-up Challenge): One unlearned dance (introducing Jazz-funk)
- Week 7 (Circus Night): One unlearned dance (introducing Lyrical Jazz)
- Week 8 (Time Machine): Two unlearned dances (introducing Afro-jazz and Rock'n'Roll)
- Week 9 (Semifinals): One unlearned or repeated dance and a trio dance (introducing Swing, Street dance and Fusion)
- Week 10 (Grand Final): Repeated week 1 dance, viewers' choice dance and couple's choice dance

Couple	1	2	3	4	5	6	7	8		9		10		
Natalia M. & Ihor	Argentine Tango	Freestyle	Foxtrot	Paso Doble	Waltz	Jazz-funk (Natalia M. & Yevhen)	Samba	Quickstep	Contemporary	Waltz	Freestyle	Argentine Tango	Contemporary	Rumba
Nadya & Yevhen	Hip-hop	Rumba	Tango	Waltz	Paso Doble	Contemporary (Nadya & Ihor)	Lyrical Jazz	Foxtrot	Disco	Modern	Fusion	Hip-hop	Rumba	Modern
Ahtem & Olena	Paso Doble	Contemporary	Salsa	Freestyle	Foxtrot	Quickstep (Ahtem & Ilona)	Tango	Waltz	Hip-hop	Swing	Paso Doble	Paso Doble	Fusion	Freestyle
Yuriy & Ilona	Broadway	Hip-hop	Modern	Cha-cha-cha	Disco	Freestyle (Yuriy & Shizhana)	Salsa	Afro-jazz	Waltz	Street dance	Tango			
Serhiy & Snizhana	Contemporary	Tango	Quickstep	Rumba	Broadway	Paso Doble (Serhiy & Oleksandra)	Foxtrot	Rock'n'Roll	Freestyle					
Dmytro & Oleksandra	Rumba	Jazz	Samba	Tango	Viennese Waltz	Cha-cha-cha (Dmytro & Olena)	Paso Doble							
Kamaliya & Dmytro	Samba	Paso Doble	Rumba	Jazz	Contemporary									
Olya & Stepan	Pop-jazz	Waltz	Cha-cha-cha	Contemporary										
Natalia Kh. & Vitaliy	Waltz	Cha-cha-cha	Paso Doble											
Oleksandr & Anna	Jive	Salsa												

Highest scoring dance
Lowest scoring dance

== Guest hosts ==
Date	Presenter	Occupation	Ref
August 27, 2017	Tina Karol	Singer, former Tantsi z zirkamy host	
August 27, 2017	Volodymyr Ostapchuk	TV host, Eurovision Song Contest 2017 host	
September 3, 2017	Valentyna Khamayko	Actress, TV host	
September 10, 2017	Kateryna Osadcha	Svitske zhyttya and The Voice of Ukraine host	
September 10, 2017	Artem Gagarin	TV host	
September 17, 2017	Liliya Rebryk	Actress, TV host, season 4 runner-up	
September 24, 2017	Zlata Ognevich	Singer	
October 1, 2017	Oleksandr Skichko	TV host, Eurovision Song Contest 2017 host	
October 8, 2017	Olya Polyakova	Singer and TV host	

== Guest performances ==
Date	Dance style	Artist(s)	Song(s)	Dancers	Ref
August 27, 2017	Freestyle	Monatik	"Vitamin D"	Professional dancers	
August 27, 2017	Contemporary	Tina Karol	"Dikaya voda"	Professional dancers	
August 27, 2017	–	Tina Karol	"Sdatsya ty vsegda uspeyesh"	–	
September 3, 2017	Freestyle	Jamala	"I Believe in U"		
September 10, 2017	Ballet	–	"Take Me to Church"	Kateryna Kukhar & Oleksandr Stoyanov	
September 10, 2017	–	The Hardkiss	"Antarktyda"	–	
September 17, 2017	–	Onuka	"Vidlik"	–	
September 17, 2017	Viennese Waltz	Nina Matviyenko	"De ty teper"	Professional dancers	
September 24, 2017	Freestyle	–	"Happy" by C2C	Freedom Ballet	
September 24, 2017	Freestyle	Olya Polyakova	"Tsvyetochyek Alyenkiy"	Professional dancers	
October 1, 2017	Bolero	–	"Bésame Mucho"	D'Arts Dance Project	
October 1, 2017	Freestyle	Max Barskih	"Tumany", "Nevernaya", "Khochu tantsevat", "Moya lyubov"	Professional dancers	
