= Tantsi z zirkamy =

Ukrainian celebrity talent show

- Ukrainian: Танці з зірками
- Genre: Talent show
- Created by: BBC Worldwide
- Presented by: Yurii Horbunov; Tina Karol; Ivanna Onufriichuk
- Judges: Vladyslav Yama; Kateryna Kukhar; Maksim Chmerkovskiy; Hryhorii Chapkis; Sisco Gomez; Monatik; Olena Koliadenko; Oleksii Lytvynov; Vladislav Borodinov; Michael Malitowski; Andrea Placidi; Nikolay Tsiskaridze; Radu Poklitaru
- Country of origin: Ukraine
- Original language: Ukrainian
- No. of seasons: 8 (1+1); 1 (STB)

Production
- Executive producer: Volodymyr Zavadiuk
- Camera setup: Multi-camera

Original release
- Network: 1+1
- Release: 7 October 2006 – 28 December 2025

Related
- Strictly Come Dancing

Tantsi z zirkamy (Ukrainian: Танці з зірками, Dancing with the Stars) is a Ukrainian dance competition show that premiered on October 7, 2006, on 1+1. The show is based on the British reality TV competition Strictly Come Dancing and is part of the Dancing with the Stars franchise.

It was first hosted by Yurii Horbunov and Tina Karol, who hosted it together until 2020, when Tina Karol left the franchise. In 2021, she was replaced by Ivanna Onufriichuk. The show also has a tradition of invited celebrity co-hosts that change every episode, among which are previous winners and participants.

Volodymyr Zelenskyy, current President of Ukraine, won the first season of the show.

== Cast ==
=== Presenters ===
Key:

Host
Co-host
Co-host and competed as a contestant before elimination
Competed as a contestant

Presenter	Season 1 (1+1)	Season 2 (1+1)	Season 3 (1+1)	Season 4 (STB)	Season 5 (1+1)	Season 6 (1+1)	Season 7 (1+1)	Season 8 (1+1)	Season 9 (1+1)
Main & Golden Room
Yuriy Horbunov									
Tina Karol					(week 1)				
Ivanna Onufriichuk								(week 2, 14)	
Dmytro Tankovych								(week 5, 14)	
Iryna Borysyuk									
Balcony
Volodymyr Ostapchuk					(week 1)	(week 5)			
Valentyna Khamayko					(week 2)				
Kateryna Osadcha					(week 3)	(week 13)	(week 13)		
Artem Gagarin					(week 3)				
Liliya Rebryk					(week 4)				
Zlata Ognevich					(week 5)				
Oleksandr Skichko					(week 6)				
Olya Polyakova					(week 7)	(week 3, 9)	(week 7)	(week 12)	(week 7)
Nelya Shovkoplyas					(week 8)			(week 10)	
Yevhen Koshovyi					(week 9)		(week 6)		
Natalia Moseichuk					(week 10)				
DZIDZIO						(week 1, 14)	(week 14)	(week 6)	
Yuriy Tkach						(week 2, 11)	(week 9)	(week 11)	(week 5)
Serhiy Babkin						(week 4)			
Snizhana Babkina						(week 4)			
Nadya Dorofeeva						(week 6)	(week 12)		
Natalia Mohylevska						(week 7)	(week 3)	(week 1)	
Potap						(week 8)	(week 8)	(week 9)	
Pavlo Zibrov						(week 10)			
Liudmyla Barbir						(week 12)		(week 10)	
Ihor Lastochkin							(week 1)		
Oleh Vynnyk							(week 2, 14)	(week 13)	
Lesia Nikitiuk							(week 4)		
Nadiya Matveeva							(week 5)		
Anna Butkevich							(week 6, 14)		
Andriy Potapenko							(week 8)	(week 9)	
Maruv							(week 10)		
Regina Todorenko							(week 11)		
Oleksiy Zavhorodniy							(week 12)	(week 14)	
Stanislav Boklan							(week 13)		
Seryoga							(week 14)		
Julia Sanina							(week 14)		
Olha Horbacheva							(week 14)	(week 8)	
Yevhen Kot								(week 2)	(week 4)
Volodymyr Dantes								(week 3)	
Maria Efrosinina								(week 4)	(week 3, 6, 10)
Anastasia Kamenskykh								(week 7)	
Ruslan Senechkin								(week 10)	
Ehor Hordeev								(week 10)	
Olha Freimut								(week 13)	
Irakli Makatsaria								(week 14)	
Oleksandr Popov								(week 14)	
Andre Tan								(week 14)	
Hanna Rizatdinova								(week 14)	
Volodymyr Horyanskyi								(week 14)	
Nazar Zadniprovskyi								(week 14)	
Aram Arzumanyan								(week 14)	
Serhiy Tachynets								(week 14)	
Serhiy Melnyk								(week 14)	
Max Barskih									(week 1)
Iryna Bilyk									(week 2)
Anastasia Orudzhova									(week 8)
Volodymyr Shumko									(week 8)
Iryna Soponaru									(week 8)
Timur Miroshnychenko									(week 9)

=== Judging panel ===
Key:

Judge
Guest judge
Competed as a contestant
Competed as a professional

Judge	Season 1 (1+1)	Season 2 (1+1)	Season 3 (1+1)	Season 4 (STB)	Season 5 (1+1)	Season 6 (1+1)	Season 7 (1+1)	Season 8 (1+1)	Season 9 (1+1)
Vadim Elezarov									
Olena Kolyadenko									
Olexiy Lytvynov									
Hrihoriy Chapkis									
Natalia Mohylevska								(week 10)	
Jaakko Toivonen									
Tetiana Denysova									
Radu Poklitaru									
Monatik							(week 4)	(week 5)	
Kateryna Kukhar									
Vladyslav Yama									
Francisco Gomez									
Maksim Chmerkovskiy									
Vladislav Borodinov			(week 1)						
Michael Malitowski			(week 1)						
Andrea Placidi			(week 1)						
Nikolay Tsiskaridze			(week 2)						
Anatoly Tryvitsky			(week 2)						
Mikaela Krupichkova			(week 2)						
Sergey Surkov			(week 3)						
Jerio Bratte			(weeks 3,7)						
Agnieszka Melnicka			(weeks 3,8)						
Leonid Pletnev			(weeks 4,8)						
Richard Porter			(week 4)						
Sergey Rupin			(week 4)						
George Vyshegorodtsev			(week 5)						
Edyta Herbus			(week 5)						
Irina Deriugina			(week 5)						
Robert Rovinsky			(week 6)						
Dmitry Timokhin			(week 6)						
Rashid Malki			(week 6,7)						
Alexey Belyaev			(week 7)						
Stanislav Popov			(week 8)						
Olena Shoptenko						(week 10)			
Volodymyr Zelenskyy						(week 14)			
Ihor Lastochkin								(week 2, 14)	
Nadya Dorofeeva								(week 3, 14)	
Lesia Nikitiuk								(week 4, 13)	(week 13)
Yuriy Tkach								(week 6)	
Irakli Makatsaria								(week 7)	
Verka Serduchka								(week 8)	
Maria Efrosinina								(week 9)	
Kseniya Mishyna								(week 11)	
Pavlo Vyshnyakov								(week 12)	
Greg Chapkis								(week 14)	
Olya Polyakova									(week 3)
Santa Dimopulos									(week 4)
Ilona Hvozdiova									(week 5)
Julia Sanina									(week 6)
NK									(week 7)

=== Professional dancers and their partners ===
Professional	Season 1	Season 2	Season 3	Season 4	Season 5	Season 6	Season 7	Season 8	Season 9
Olena Shoptenko	Volodymyr Zelenskyy	—N/a	Maksym Nelipa	—N/a	Akhtem Seitablayev	—N/a	Oleksiy Yarovenko	Oleh Vynnyk	—N/a
Vladyslav Yama	Natalia Mohylevska	—N/a	Natalia Mohylevska	—N/a					
Ksenia Gorb	Vitaliy Kozlovsky	—N/a	Vitaliy Kozlovsky	—N/a					
Mykola Kovalenko	Ruslana Pysanka	—N/a							
Igor Yaryomenko	Nadia Meikher	—N/a							
Daria Dovgalova	Ostap Stupka	—N/a							
Igor Bondarenko	Olga Sumska	—N/a							
Ilona Kleshnina	Anatoly Borsyuk	—N/a							
Anna Pelipenko	—N/a	Maksym Nelipa	Marcin Mroczek	—N/a					
Dmytro Dikusar	—N/a	Iryna Bilyk	—N/a				Victoria Bulitko	Slava Kaminska	Olha Kharlan
Yelyzaveta Druzhynina	—N/a	Oleh Skrypka	—N/a				Mykhailo Kukuiyuk	—N/a	
Kateryna Tryshyna	—N/a	Yevhen Koshovyi	—N/a						Fahot
Serhiy Kostetskyi	—N/a	Lilia Podkopayeva	—N/a						
Andrey Matvienko	—N/a	Svetlana Loboda	—N/a						
Maxim Bulgakov	—N/a	Snizhana Yegorova	—N/a						
Polina Komysova	—N/a	Oleksandr Ponomariov	—N/a						
Kyrylo Khitrov	—N/a		Lilia Podkopayeva	—N/a					
Evgeny Papunaishvili	—N/a		Natalia Koroleva	—N/a					
Angela Madonia	—N/a		Pamela Camassa	—N/a					
Julia Okropiridze	—N/a		Manuel Ortega	—N/a					
Ilona Hvozdiova	—N/a			Oleksandr Kryvoshapko	Yuriy Tkach	Ihor Lastochkin	Volodymyr Ostapchuk	Dmytro Tankovych	—N/a
Vitaliy Zahoruyko	—N/a			Anfisa Chekhova	Natalia Kholodenko	—N/a			
Yuliya Sakhnevich	—N/a			Nikita Dzhigurda	—N/a	Pavlo Vyshnyakov	Daniel Salem	Oleksiy Zavhorodniy	—N/a
Olena Pull	—N/a			Stas Shurins	—N/a				
Andrii Dykyi	—N/a			Liliia Rebrik	—N/a				
Irina Leshchenko	—N/a			Volodymyr Tkachenko	—N/a				
Eugene Karyakin	—N/a			Natalia Bochkaryova	—N/a				
Anna Olefirenko	—N/a			Sergey Sosedov	—N/a				
Galina Pekha	—N/a			Vadim Andreev	—N/a				
Anton Kiba	—N/a			Elena Korikova	—N/a				
Inna Mazurenko	—N/a			Boris Barsky	—N/a				
Kateryna Karyakina	—N/a			Valery Yurchenko	—N/a				
Pavlo Orel	—N/a			Tetiana Dogileva	—N/a				
Anton Rybalchenko	—N/a			Anna Poslavska	—N/a				
Dmytro Zhuk	—N/a				Kamaliya	Zlata Ognevich	Lydmyla Barbir	Julia Sanina	—N/a
Yevhen Kot	—N/a				Nadya Dorofeeva	Michelle Andrade	Kseniya Mishyna	—N/a	
Ihor Kuzmenko	—N/a				Natalia Mohylevska	Slava Kaminska	Tayanna	—N/a	
Snizhana Babkina	—N/a				Serhiy Babkin	—N/a			
Stepan Misyurka	—N/a				Olya Polyakova	—N/a			
Anna Palamarchuk	—N/a				Oleksandr Skichko	—N/a			
Yana Tsybulska	—N/a					Ruslan Senechkin	Dzidzio	Serhiy Tachynets	Ivan Liulenov
Maks Leonov	—N/a					Maria Efrosinina	Olena Kravets	Santa Dimopulos	Evgenia Vlasova
Oleksandr Prokhorov	—N/a					Anita Lutsenko	Ganna Rizatdinova	—N/a	
Yana Zayets	—N/a					Irakli Makatsaria	—N/a	Taras Tsymbalyuk	—N/a
Max Ezhov	—N/a					Lesya Nikitiuk	—N/a		
Kateryna Bilyavska	—N/a					Denys Berinchyk	—N/a		
Dmitry Chaplin	—N/a					Oksana Marchenko	—N/a		
Nana	—N/a					Mykola Tischenko	—N/a		
Maria Shmelyova	—N/a					Pavlo Zibrov	—N/a		
Adelina Deli	—N/a						Seryoga	Serhiy Melnyk	—N/a
Evhen "Jay" Dmitrienko	—N/a						Maruv	—N/a	
Valeriy Shokin	—N/a						Nadiya Matveeva	—N/a	
Kyrylo Vasyuk	—N/a							Nadia Meikher	—N/a
Yuriy Hurych	—N/a							alyona alyona	—N/a
Ihor Helunenko	—N/a							Daria Petrozhytska	—N/a
Antonina Rudenko	—N/a							Aram Arzumanyan	—N/a
Ilya Padzina	—N/a							Olha Freimut	—N/a
Oleksiy Bazela	—N/a								Lida Lee
Yuriy Meshkov	—N/a								Oleksandra Zaritska
Alina Lee	—N/a								Dmytro Kadnay
Daniella Preap	—N/a								Stanislav Horuna
Mariya Kolosova	—N/a								Oleksiy Suvorovtsev
Denys Samson	—N/a								Anastasia Orudzhova
Elyzaveta Rusina	—N/a								Melovin
Anton Nesterko	—N/a								Jamala
Roksolana Malanchuk	—N/a								Kostyantyn Voitenko
Anna Karelina	—N/a								Artur Lohai

Key:

Winner of the series
Second place of the series
Third place of the series
First elimination of the series
Withdrew in the series
Elimination of the series

== Episodes ==
=== Series overview ===
Season	Network	No. of stars	No. of weeks	Duration dates	Celebrity honor places		
Season	Network	No. of stars	No. of weeks	Duration dates	Winner	Second place	Third place
1) 2006	1+1	8	8	October 8, 2006 – November 26, 2006	Volodymyr Zelenskyy & Olena Shoptenko	Natalia Mohylevska & Vladyslav Yama	Ruslana Pysanka & Mykola Kovalenko
2) 2007	1+1	8	8	March 10, 2007 – April 28, 2007	Lilia Podkopayeva & Serhiy Kostetskyi	Oleg Skrypka & Yelyzaveta Druzhynina	Yevhen Koshovyi & Kateryna Tryshyna
3) 2007	1+1	8	8	October 14, 2007 – December 2, 2007	Marcin Mroczek & Hanna Pelypenko	Natalia Mohylevska & Vladyslav Yama	Lilia Podkopayeva & Kyrylo Khitrov
4) 2011	STB	14	14	February 26, 2011 – May 28, 2011	Stas Shurins & Olena Pul	Liliya Rebryk & Andriy Dykyi	Volodymyr Tkachenko & Iryna Leshchenko
5) 2017	1+1	10	10	August 27, 2017 – October 29, 2017	Natalia Mohylevska & Ihor Kuzmenko	Nadya Dorofeeva & Yevhen Kot	Akhtem Seitablayev & Olena Shoptenko
6) 2018	1+1	14	14	August 26, 2018 – November 25, 2018	Ihor Lastochkin & Ilona Hvozdeva	Lesya Nikitiuk & Max Ezhov	Irakli Makatsaria & Yana Zayets
7) 2019	1+1	14	14	August 25, 2019 – November 24, 2019	Kseniya Mishyna & Yevhen Kot	Ganna Rizatdinova & Oleksandr Prokhorov	Victoria Bulitko & Dmytro Dikusar
8) 2020	1+1	14	14	August 31, 2020 – November 29, 2020	Santa Dimopulos & Maks Leonov	Julia Sanina & Dmytro Zhuk	Nadia Meikher & Kyrylo Vasyuk
9) 2021	1+1	14	13	September 5, 2021 – November 28, 2021	Artur Lohai & Anna Karelina	Olha Kharlan & Dmytro Dikusar	Kostyantyn Voitenko & Roksolyana Malanchuk

=== Season 1 ===
Celebrity	Occupation	Professional partner	Status
Anatoliy Borsyuk	Journalist	Ilona Kleshnina	Eliminated 1st
Ostap Stupka	Actor	Daria Dovgalyova	Eliminated 2nd
Vitaliy Kozlovsky	Singer	Ksenia Gorb	Eliminated 3rd
Nadia Meiher	Singer	Igor Yaryomenko	Eliminated 4th
Olha Sumska	Actress	Ihor Bondarenko	Eliminated 5th
Ruslana Pysanka	Actress	Mykola Kovalenko	Third place
Natalia Mohylevska	Singer	Vladyslav Yama	Runner-up
Volodymyr Zelenskyy	Comedian	Olena Shoptenko	Winner

=== Season 4 ===
Celebrity	Occupation	Professional partner	Status
Anna Poslavska	3rd runner-up Miss Universe 2010	Anton Rybalchenko	Eliminated 1st
Tatyana Dogileva	Actress	Pavlo Orel	Eliminated 2nd
Valery Yurchenko	Artist, singer	Kateryna Karyakina	Eliminated 3rd
Boris Barsky	Actor	Inna Mazurenko	Eliminated 4th
Elena Korikova	Actress	Anton Kiba	Eliminated 5th
Nikita Dzhigurda	Actor	Yuliya Sakhnevich	Eliminated 6th
Anfisa Chekhova	TV-presenter, actress	Vitaliy Zahoruyko	Eliminated 7th
Vadim Andreyev	Actor	Galina Pekha	Eliminated 8th
Oleksandr Kryvoshapko	Singer	Ilona Hvozdiova	Eliminated 9th
Sergey Sosedov	journalist and music critic	Anna Olefirenko	Eliminated 10th
Natalya Bochkareva	Actress	Eugene Karyakin	Eliminated 11th
Volodymyr Tkachenko	Singer	Irina Leshchenko	Third place
Liliia Rebrik	TV host	Andrii Dykyi	Runner-up
Stas Shurins	Singer	Olena Pull	Winner

=== Season 5 ===
Celebrity	Occupation	Professional partner	Status
Oleksandr Skichko	TV host	Anna Palamarchuk	Eliminated 1st
Natalia Kholodenko	TV psychologist	Vitaliy Zahoruyko	Eliminated 2nd
Olya Polyakova	Singer and TV host	Stepan Misyurka	Eliminated 3rd
Kamaliya	Singer and socialite	Dmytro Zhuk	Eliminated 4th
Dmytro Komarov	Travel show host	Oleksandr Prokhorov	Withdrew
Serhiy Babkin	5'nizza singer	Snizhana Babkina	Eliminated 5th
Yuriy Tkach	Actor and comedian	Ilona Hvozdiova	Eliminated 6th
Akhtem Seitablayev	Actor and movie director	Olena Shoptenko	Third place
Nadya Dorofeeva	Vremya i Steklo singer	Yevhen Kot	Runner-up
Natalia Mohylevska	Singer	Ihor Kuzmenko	Winner

=== Season 6 ===
Celebrity	Occupation	Professional partner	Status
Slava Kaminska	Singer	Ihor Kuzmenko	Withdrew
Zlata Ognevich	Singer	Dmytro Zhuk	Eliminated 1st
Pavlo Zibrov	Singer	Maria Shmelyova	Eliminated 2nd
Mykola Tischenko	Restaurateur	Nana	Eliminated 3rd
Maria Efrosinina	TV host	Maks Leonov	Eliminated 4th
Anita Lutsenko	TV host and fitness trainer	Oleksandr Prokhorov	Eliminated 5th
Oksana Marchenko	TV host	Dmitry Chaplin	Withdrew
Ruslan Senechkin	TV host	Yana Tsybulska	Eliminated 6th
Denys Berinchyk	Boxer	Kateryna Bilyavska	Eliminated 7th
Michelle Andrade	Singer	Yevhen Kot	Eliminated 8th
Pavlo Vyshnyakov	Actor	Yuliya Sakhnevich	Eliminated 9th
Irakli Makatsaria	Movie producer	Yana Zayets	Third place
Lesya Nikitiuk	TV host	Max Ezhov	Runner-up
Ihor Lastochkin	Comedian	Ilona Hvozdiova	Winner

=== Season 7 ===
Celebrity	Occupation	Professional partner	Status
Tayanna	Singer	Ihor Kuzmenko	Eliminated 1st
Seryoga	Singer	Adelina Deli	Eliminated 2nd
Nadiya Matveeva	TV and radio host	Valeriy Shokin	Eliminated 3rd
Maruv	Singer	Evhen "Jay" Dmitrienko	Eliminated 4th
Dzidzio	Singer	Yana Tsybulska	Eliminated 5th
Mykhailo Kukuiyuk	Actor	Yelyzaveta Druzhynina	Eliminated 6th
Liudmyla Barbir	Actress and TV host	Dmytro Zhuk	Eliminated 7th
Daniel Salem	TV host	Yuliya Sakhnevich	Eliminated 8th
Oleksiy Yarovenko	Actor	Olena Shoptenko	Eliminated 9th
Olena Kravets	Actress and comedian	Maks Leonov	Eliminated 10th
Volodymyr Ostapchuk	TV host	Ilona Hvozdiova	Eliminated 11th
Victoria Bulitko	Actress	Dmytro Dikusar	Third place
Hanna Rizatdinova	Rhythmic gymnast	Oleksandr Prokhorov	Runner-up
Kseniya Mishyna	Actress	Yevhen Kot	Winner

=== Season 8 ===
Celebrity	Occupation	Professional partner	Status
Dmytro Tankovych	Comedian and TV host	Ilona Hvozdeva	Eliminated 1st
Slava Kaminska	Singer	Dmytro Dikusar	Eliminated 2nd
alyona alyona	Rapper	Yuriy Hurych	Eliminated 3rd
Aram Arzumanyan	Actor	Antonina Rudenko	Eliminated 4th
Oleh Vynnyk	Singer	Olena Shoptenko	Withdrew
Taras Tsymbalyuk	Actor	Yana Zayets	Eliminated 5th
Oleksiy Zavhorodniy	Vremya i Steklo singer	Yuliya Sakhnevich	Eliminated 6th
Daria Petrozhytska	Actress	Ihor Helunenko	Withdrew
Olha Freimut	TV host	Ilya Padzina	Eliminated 7th
Serhiy Tachynets	Bez Obmezhen singer	Yana Tsybulska	Eliminated 8th
Serhiy Melnyk	Footballer	Adelina Deli	Eliminated 9th
Nadia Meikher	Singer, Actress	Kyrylo Vasyuk	Third place
Julia Sanina	The Hardkiss Singer	Dmytro Zhuk	Runner-up
Santa Dimopulos	Singer	Maks Leonov	Winner

1. COV: Participant tested positive for COVID-19 during the show and missed some episodes

==== Score ====
Couple	Place	1	2	3	4	5	6	7	8	9	10	11	12	13	14
Santa & Maks	1	28	37	37	39	33	39	40	37	40	37	80	100	119	117
Julia & Dmytro	2	21	34	37	35	38	38	38	38	39	38	79	97	119	118
Nadia & Kyrylo	3	26	37	36	40	35	39	38	38	38	39	78	93	116	115
Serhiy M. & Adelina	4	21	32	30	35	36	37	34	39	39	38	72	91		
Serhiy T. & Yana	5	17	27	28	34	31	34	33	35	33	35	69			
Olha & Ilya	6	26	33	29	35	32	34	30	33	35	35				
Daria & Ihor	7	—N/a	31	30	30	29	28	34	32	30					
Oleksiy & Yuliya	8	21	32	32	29	27	28	—N/a	36						
Oleh & Olena	9	25	31	35	36	—N/a		W							
Taras & Yana	10	26	32	32	34	29	34								
Aram & Antonina	11	22	35	36	36	31									
Alyona & Yuriy	12	16	29	27	26										
Slava & Dmytro	13	20	25	26											
Dmytro & Ilona	14	19	29												

Red numbers indicate the lowest score for each week.
Green numbers indicate the highest score for each week.
indicates the couple eliminated that week.
indicates the couple that finished in the bottom two.
indicates the couple that withdrew.
indicates the couple that was saved from elimination by another couple's withdrawal.
indicates the winning couple.
indicates the runner-up couple.
indicates the couple in third place.

=== Season 9 ===
Celebrity	Occupation	Professional partner	Status
Anastasia Orudzhova	Comedian	Denys Samson	Withdrew
Ivan Liulenov	Comedian	Yana Tsybulska	Eliminated 1st
Oleksandra Mashlyatina	Comedian	Denys Samson	Eliminated 2nd
Oleksiy Suvorovtsev	Actor	Mariya Kolosova	Eliminated 3rd
Fahot	Singer	Kateryna Tryshyna	Eliminated 4th
Lida Lee	Singer	Oleksiy Bazela	Eliminated 5th
Jamala	Singer	Anton Nesterko	Eliminated 6th
Stanislav Horuna	Karateka	Daniella Preap	Eliminated 7th
Evgenia Vlasova	Singer	Maks Leonov	Eliminated 8th
Melovin	Singer	Elyzaveta "Liza" Rusina	Eliminated 9th
Oleksandra Zaritska	Singer	Yuriy Meshkov	Eliminated 10th
Dmytro Kadnay	Musician	Alina Lee	Eliminated 11th
Kostyantyn Voitenko	Actor	Roksolyana Malanchuk	Third place
Olha Kharlan	Fencer	Dmytro Dikusar	Runner-up
Artur Lohai	Actor, singer	Anna Karelina	Winner

==== Score ====
Couple	Place	1	2	3	4	5	6	7	8	9	10	11	12	13	Total	
Artur & Anna	1	18	21	30	30	31	37	35	28	29	28+30	29+40				386
Olha & Dmytro	2	15	17	29	32	33	33	33	25	26	26+29	28+38				364
Kostyantyn & Roksolyana	3	18	16	31	30	31	34	38	26	27	28+30	30+39				378
Dmytro & Alina	4	21	21	29	30	34	34	36	N/A	26	29+30	29+38				357
Oleksandra Z. & Yuriy	5	16	16	31	30	28	29	33	25	24	23+28					283
Melovin & Liza	6	13	13	22	25	23	31	30	21	25						203
Evgeniya & Maks	7	15	18	28	27	25	32	32	25							202
Stanislav & Daniella	8	18	16	24	28	27	33	30								176
Jamala & Anton	9	19	17	25	29	29	31	29								179
Lida & Oleksiy	10	20	19	28	31	30	34									162
Fahot & Kateryna	11	17	14	27	29	26										113
Oleksiy & Mariya	12	7	12	27	27											73
Oleksandra M. & Denys	13	—N/a	15	24												39
Ivan & Yana	14	19	15													34
Anastasia & Denys	15	13														13

Red numbers indicate the lowest score for each week.
Green numbers indicate the highest score for each week.
the couple has an immunity, and could not be eliminated
indicates the couple eliminated that week.
indicates the couple that finished in the bottom two or three.
indicates the couple that withdrew.
indicates the couple that was saved from elimination by another couple's withdrawal.
indicates the winning couple.
indicates the runner-up couple.
indicates the couple in third place.
