= Zibrov =

Zibrov (Russian: Зибров, Ukrainian: Зібров) is a Slavic masculine surname, its feminine counterpart is Zibrova. Notable people with the surname include:

- Andrei Zibrov (born 1973), Russian actor
- Pavlo Zibrov, Ukrainian pop singer and songwriter
