= Hryhorii Chapkis =

Ukrainian dancer and choreographer (1930–2021)

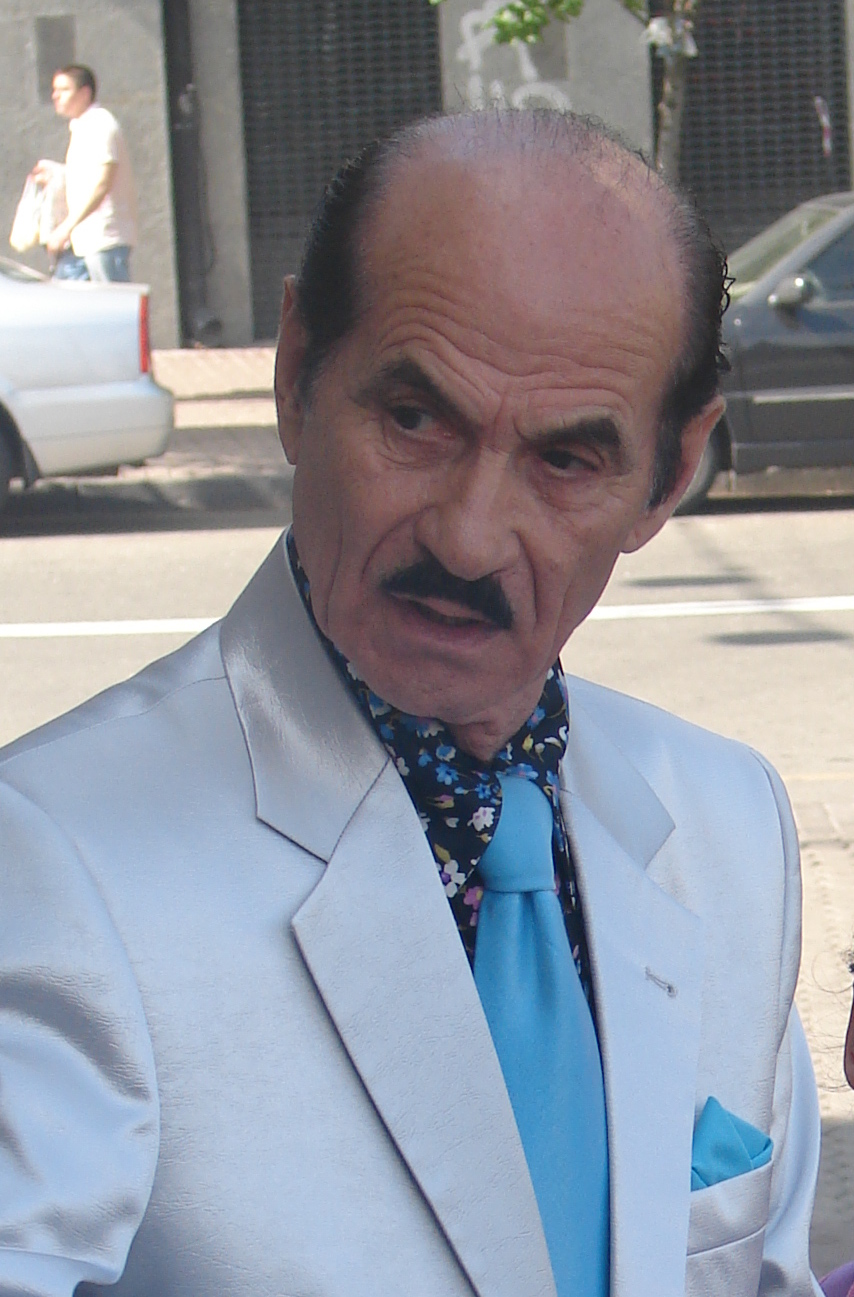
- Born: 24 February 1930; Chișinău, Kingdom of Romania (now Moldova)
- Died: 13 June 2021 (aged 91); Kyiv, Ukraine
- Occupations: dancer and choreographer
- Known for: Judge on Tantsi z Zirkamy
- Awards: People's Artist of Ukraine (2010)

Hryhorii (or Grigoriy) Mykolaiovych Chapkis (24 February 1930 – 13 June 2021) was a Ukrainian dancer and choreographer.

== Biography ==
Chapkis began dancing as a child and performed with the state dance ensemble led by Pavlo Virsky before founding his own dance school, Chapkis Dance, later run by his daughter Liliya. From 2006 he was a judge on the Ukrainian television series Tantsi z Zirkamy (Dancing with the Stars).

He was laureate of three international competitions. He was awarded the title of Meritorious Artist of the Ukrainian SSR in 1964, and became a People's Artist of Ukraine in February 2010.

He also held the following academic positions:

- Professor of the Department of Contemporary Choreography, Faculty of Choreographic Arts, Kyiv National University of Culture and Arts.
- Professor at the Faculty of Choreographic Arts, Kyiv University of Culture.
- Professor of the Department of Choreography at the Institute of Arts of Borys Grinchenko Kyiv University.

Chapkis died in Kyiv on 13 June 2021, aged 91, from complications of COVID-19.

== Awards ==
- Meritorious Artist of the Ukrainian SSR (1964)
- People's Artist of Ukraine (2010)
- Order of Prince Yaroslav the Wise, 5th class (2020)
