= Koroleva nochi =

2019 EP by Olya Polyakova

EP by Olya Polyakova
- Released: 1 February 2019
- Recorded: 2017–2019
- Genre: Pop; Europop
- Length: 25:46
- Language: Russian
- Label: Best Music
- Producer: Mykhailo Koshovyi

Olya Polyakova chronology
Shlyopali shlyopki (2017)	Koroleva nochi (2019)

Singles from Koroleva nochi
- 1. "Byvshy" Released: 19 September 2017; 2. "Koroleva nochi" Released: 24 May 2018; 3. "Lyubovnitsa" Released: 23 November 2018; 4. "Lyod tronulsya" Released: 15 February 2019; 5. "Zvonila" Released: 5 July 2019

Professional ratings
Review scores
Source	Rating
InterMedia	4/5 stars

Koroleva nochi (Cyrillic: Королева ночи; transl. Queen of the Night) is the first EP by Ukrainian singer Olya Polyakova. It was released on 1 February 2019 through Best Music. The album includes the singles "Byvshy", "Koroleva nochi", "Lyubovnitsa", "Lyod tronulsya" and "Zvonila".

== Track listing ==
No.	Title	Writer(s)	Length
1.	"Koroleva nochi"	Olha Zhyvotkova	3:36
2.	"Lyod tronulsya"	Dmytro Sysoiev, Mykhailo Koshovyi	3:38
3.	"Lyubovnitsa"	Olha Zhyvotkova	3:41
4.	"Zvonila"	Myroslav Kuvaldin	3:44
5.	"Mdonna"	Anastasiia Liashchenko	3:59
6.	"Semiramida"	Dmytro Sysoiev	3:43
7.	"Byvshy"	Myroslav Kuvaldin, Mykhailo Yasynskyii	3:22
Total length:			25:46

== Accolades ==
Year	Award	Category	Nominee(s)	Result	Ref.
2018	Music Platform Award	Best Song	"Koroleva nochi"	Nominated	
2019	YUNA Music Award	Best Female Artist	Olya Polyakova	Won	
2019	YUNA Music Award	Best Concert Tour	Koroleva nochi Tour	Nominated	
2019	Music Platform Award	Best Song	"Led tronulsya"	Won	
2020	YUNA Music Award	Best Pop Hit	"Lyubovnitsa"	Won	
2020	YUNA Music Award	Best Concert Tour	Koroleva nochi. Na bis Tour	Nominated	

== Release history ==
Region	Date	Format	Label	Ref.
Ukraine	February 1, 2019	Digital download	Best Music	
