= Shlyopali shlyopki =

2017 studio album by Olya Polyakova

Studio album by Olya Polyakova
- Released: January 27, 2017
- Recorded: 2012–2016
- Genre: Vernacular pop
- Language: Russian
- Label: Best Music

Olya Polyakova chronology
Prikhodi ko mne (2001)	Shlyopali shlyopki (2017)	Koroleva nochi (2019)

Singles from Shlyopali shlyopki
- 1. "#Шлёпки" Released: May 22, 2013; 2. "Russian Style" Released: May 28, 2013; 3. "Люли" Released: December 16, 2013; 4. "Асталависта, сепаратиста!" Released: January 1, 2014; 5. "Брошенный котёня" Released: May 1, 2014; 6. "Любовь-морковь" Released: March 13, 2015; 7. "Первое лето без него" Released: June 29, 2015; 8. "О Боже, как больно!" Released: April 12, 2016; 9. "Плавочки" Released: August 12, 2016

Professional ratings
Review scores
Source	Rating
InterMedia	3/5 stars

Shlyopali shlyopki (Russian: Шлёпали шлёпки; transl. Flip-flops flip-flopped / Slaps slapped) is the second studio album by Ukrainian singer Olya Polyakova released 27 January 2017. The album mainly contains songs that have already been released before, but according to Polyakova's idea, the playlist should reflect her real creative path. Polyakova calls her style "vernacular pop".

The album was preceded by the all-Ukrainian tour "Shlyopali shlyopki", which gave the name to the album.

== Track listing ==
No.	Title	Lyrics	Music	Length
1.	"Polyakova Style"	Alexander Voevutskiy	Gennady Krupnik	3:11
2.	"#Шлёпки" ("Shlyopki")	Vitaly Taran, Alexander Vrataryov	Vitaly Taran	3:35
3.	"Плавочки" ("Plavochki")	Vitaly Taran, Miroslav Kuvaldin	Miroslav Kuvaldin	3:32
4.	"Люли" ("Lyuli")	Inna Rakhmanina	Svetlana Kulyomina	3:35
5.	"Любовь-морковь" ("Lyubov-morkov")	Наталья Касимцева	Svetlana Kulyomina	3:12
6.	"О Боже, как больно" ("O Bozhe kak bolno")	Natalya Yarmolenko, Miroslav Kuvaldin	Natalya Yarmolenko	3:13
7.	"Первое лето без него" ("Pervoe leto bez nego")	Mikhail Yasinskiy, Olga Polyakova, Miroslav Kuvaldin, Omar Khayyam	Olga Polyakova, Miroslav Kuvaldin	3:36
8.	"Шарик" ("Sharik")	Tatyana Zaluzhnaya	Tatyana Zaluzhnaya	3:04
9.	"Мальчикам это нравится" ("Malchikam eto nravitsya")	Svetlana Kravchuk	Svetlana Kravchuk	3:32
10.	"Мама казала" ("Mama kazala")	Miroslav Kuvaldin	Miroslav Kuvaldin	3:05
11.	"Love is"	Miroslav Kuvaldin	Василий Ткач, Miroslav Kuvaldin	3:39
12.	"Брошенный котёня" ("Broshenny kotyonya")	Mikhail Yasinskiy	Ruslan Kvinta	3:02
13.	"Асталависта" ("Astalavista")	Miroslav Kuvaldin, Mikhail Yasinskiy	Miroslav Kuvaldin	3:29
Total length:				43:42
