= Santa Dimopulos =

Ukrainian singer (born 1987)

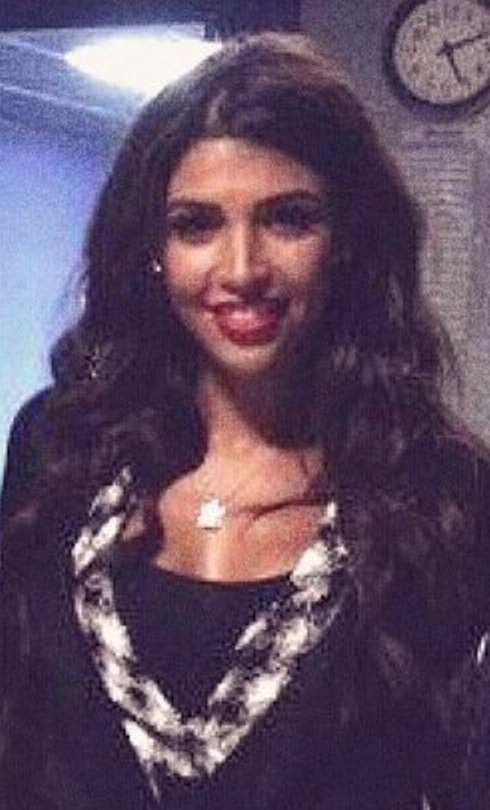
- Born: Santa Ihorivna Dimopulos; 21 May 1987 (age 39); Kyiv, Ukraine
- Years active: 2007-present
- Spouse: Igor Kucherenko
- Children: Daniel Dimopulos; Sofia Kucherenko/Dimopulos
- Musical career
- Genres: Pop
- Instrument: Vocals
- Formerly of: VIA Gra

Santa Ihorivna Dimopulos (Ukrainian: Санта Ігорівна Дімопулос; born 21 May 1987) is a Ukrainian singer of Assyrian-Greek descent. The champion of the 2011 WBPF World Championship in the category "World Women Model Physique 165 cm+." The winner of a Ukrainian TV show Dancing with the Stars 2020.

== Biography ==
In 2006, she placed third in the Miss Ukraine Universe pageant.

Between 2011 and 2012, she was a member of the Ukrainian musical group Nu Virgos (known as VIA Gra in Ukraine). Between 2016 and 2017, she formed part of the Russian girl group Queens, a trio of ex-Nu Virgos singers.
