= Kseniya Mishyna =

Ukrainian actress

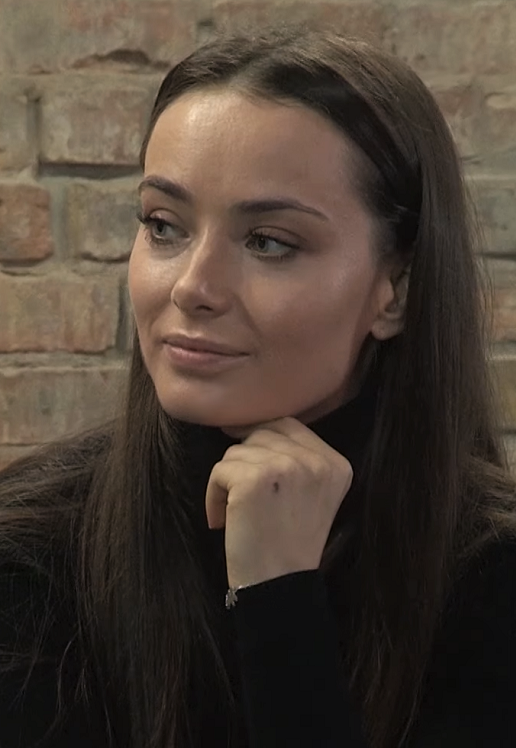
- Mishyna in 2019
- Born: Kseniya Oleksandrivna Mishyna; 18 June 1989 (age 36); Sevastopol, Ukrainian SSR, Soviet Union
- Citizenship: Ukraine
- Education: Kyiv National I. K. Karpenko-Kary Theatre, Cinema and Television University
- Occupation: Actress
- Years active: 2014–present
- Children: 1

Kseniya Oleksandrivna Mishyna (Ukrainian: Ксенія Олександрівна Мішина, born 18 June 1989) is a Ukrainian film and stage actress.

== Biography ==
=== Early years ===
Mishyna was born in 1989 in Sevastopol. In 2007, she won the title of vice-commissioner at the beauty contest "Sevastopol Beauty". She was awarded a special prize from the audience. After graduating from high school, Mishyna went to the capital Kyiv, where she studied acting at the Kyiv National I. K. Karpenko-Kary Theatre, Cinema and Television University, where she graduated in 2015.

In 2010 she took part in the casting of the TV show "Ukraine does not believe in tears", where the main prize of the project were three main roles in the musical by Konstantin Meladze.

=== 2014 - present ===
While still studying at the theater, Mishyna made her film debut in 2014. After graduating from university she became an actress of the Kyiv Academic Young Theatre.

The first important work of the actress was the role of Camilla in the melodrama "Temptation", and she received real professional recognition in 2019, playing the role of the main antagonist, the cruel landlady Lidiya Shefer in the TV series "Fortress".

From August to November 2019, she took part in the dance show Tantsi z zirkamy where she was paired with choreographer Yevhen Kot, becoming the winners of the project.

On 23 October 2020, the reality television series "Holostyachka" started on the STB TV channel. 15 men were fighting for the heart of the main character Mishyna. Viewers watched as the men organized a date and surprised, won the heart and affection of the main character. At the end of the project, Mishyna stayed with comedian Oleksandr Ellert.

== Personal life ==
Mishyna has a son, Platon (2011). After the show "Holostyachka", she began a relationship with the finalist of the show Oleksandr Ellert; the couple lives together, but isn’t officially married. In the summer of 2022, Oleksandr moved to the USA.

== Awards and nominations ==
Awards
| Year | Awards ceremony | Category | Project | Result | Ref. |
|---|---|---|---|---|---|
| 2022 | Sarajevo Film Festival | Best Actress in a Drama Series | Šutnja | Nominated | |
