= Oleksandr Skichko =

Ukrainian comedian, actor, television presenter, and politician

- Олександр Скічко
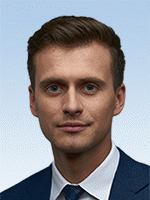
- Official portrait, 2019

Governor of Cherkasy Oblast
- In office 29 January 2021 – 2 March 2022
- President: Volodymyr Zelenskyy
- Preceded by: Viktor Husak (acting)
- Succeeded by: Ihor Taburets

People's Deputy of Ukraine
- In office 29 August 2019 – 30 March 2021
- Constituency: Cherkasy, District No.197

Personal details
- Born: Oleksandr Oleksandrovych Skichko; 28 April 1991 (age 35) Cherkasy, Ukrainian SSR
- Party: Servant of the People
- Domestic partner: Elyzaveta Yurusheva (m. 2017)
- Children: 2
- Education: Kyiv National Economic University
- Occupation: Politician; comedian; actor; television presenter

Oleksandr Oleksandrovych Skichko (Ukrainian: Олександр Олександрович Скічко; born 28 April 1991 in Cherkasy) is a Ukrainian politician, comedian, actor, and television presenter. From 29 January 2021 to 2 March 2022 Skichko was Governor of Cherkasy Oblast.

== Career ==
=== Television ===
Skichko began his television career in 2006, hosting teen-focused programs for the Ukrainian music channel O-TV, and later was a finalist on season one of Ukrayina maye talant in 2009, performing as a parody act.

After graduating in 2013 from Kyiv National Economic University with a degree in economics, Skichko later began to transition into more mature roles on television while hosting the show Pidyom on Novyi Kanal from 2012 to 2013. In 2017, Skichko became one of the three cohosts of the Eurovision Song Contest 2017 in Kyiv. This was the first time ever that a trio of male hosts hosted the show, and the first time since its inaugural edition in 1956 that a woman was not part of the hosting team.

Following Eurovision, Skichko became a contestant on the fifth season of Tantsi z zirkamy, the Ukrainian version of Dancing with the Stars. He ultimately was the first celebrity contestant to be eliminated.

=== Politics ===
Skichko took part in the 2019 Ukrainian parliamentary election as a candidate for Servant of the People in electoral district 197 centred around Kaniv, located in Skichko's birthplace of Cherkasy Oblast. He ultimately was elected to the Verkhovna Rada (Ukraine's parliament) with 50.93% of the vote, and was sworn in as a member of the ninth convocation on 29 August 2019.

On 29 January 2021, Ukrainian president Volodymyr Zelenskyy appointed Skichko the Governor of Cherkasy Oblast.

On 30 March 2021, the Verkhovna Rada deprived Skichko of his parliamentary mandate.

Skichko was replaced as Governor by Ihor Taburets on 2 March 2022. Taburets was appointed on the seventh day of the 2022 Russian invasion of Ukraine.

== See also ==
- List of Eurovision Song Contest presenters
- List of members of the parliament of Ukraine, 2019–24
