= Natalia Mohylevska =

Ukrainian singer (born 1975)

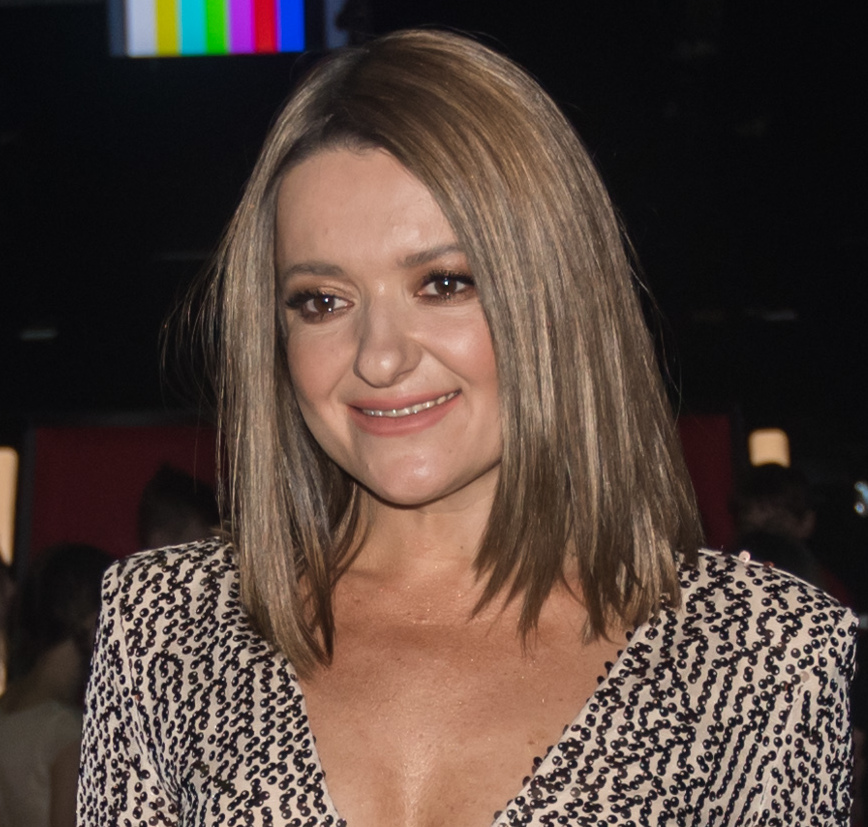
- Mohylevska during the Ukrainian edition of The Voice Kids, 2017

Background information
- Born: Наталія Могила; 2 August 1975 (age 51); Kyiv, Ukraine
- Genres: Pop, Adult Contemporary, Pop Ballad, Europop, Jazz
- Occupations: singer; songwriter; artist
- Instruments: vocals
- Years active: 1995–present
- Label: «Talant Music»
- Website: www.mogilevskaya.com.ua

Natalia Oleksiyivna Mohylevska, (Note: Ukrainian: Наталія Олексіївна Могилевська, romanized: Nataliia Oleksiivna Mohylevska, Russian: Наталья Могилевская, romanized: Nataliya Mogilevskaya) née Mohyla (Note: Ukrainian: Могила.) (born 2 August 1975) is a Ukrainian pop singer, songwriter, composer, actress, TV presenter and producer, National Artist of Ukraine (2004). She has been known for performances in both Ukrainian and Russian languages.

== Career ==
=== Early years ===
After finishing nine classes nine classes of Kyiv secondary school number 195 named after V. I. Kudryashov in Berezniaky, Mohylevska graduated from the Ukrainian Circus Academy. Between 1990 and 1995 she performed as a soloist and actress of the Ukrainian folk theater “Rodyna”, the Kyiv House of Actors, the Kyiv Variety Theater, and the Jewish Theater “Stern”. During that time, she was also a backing vocalist for Russian singer Sergey Penkin.

=== 1995–1997: Beginning of career ===
In 1995, with the support of her producer Yuriy Rybchynskyi, Mohylevska began a solo career. At Chervona Ruta in Simferopol, she received a diploma, and a month later gained the first place in the Slavic Bazaar.

In early 1996, Oleksandr Yaholnyk became the new producer of the singer, and pop songs were added to the lyrical drama repertoire. In the summer at the Yalta Festival "Sea of Friends", Mohylevska occupied the second place, giving way to Oleksandr Ponomariov.

In the autumn of 1996, she entered the Kyiv National Institute of Culture and Arts, graduating in 1999.

In the summer of 1997, Natalia presented her first album, "La la la", which sold millions of copies.

=== 1998–2003: La la la ===
In the autumn of 1998 Mohylevska stopped working with Yaholnyk, and independently engaged in production, having entered into a contract on cooperation with "Tavria Games" in February 1999. The result of the collaboration was the release of an album of her songs, entitled "Only Me".

In the "Golden Firebird" Award in the "Song" category among the three applicants, two songs from Natalia received prizes: "The Moon" and "Only Me". The "Moon" was recognized as the best song of the year in Ukraine, and Natalia Mohylevska herself was the best singer. In the spring of 2000, she began an all-Ukrainian tour with the band.

In July 2001, Natalia was recognized for the second time in a row as the best singer in Ukraine, for which she received the golden feather. In October, Nova Records released her third CD "Netakaya"

The break with the composer Oleksandr Yaholnyk became critical in her work. The main work of this period was the release of the single "Winter" ("The Plush bear»), clip "Lemon Lantern". The second half of 2003 marked several events at once. The book of the girlfriend of the singer Lada Luzina "Adventures of Natalia Mohylevska and the witches of Ivanna Karamazova" has been published, the prototypes of the main heroes of which were Mohylevska and Luzina himself.

=== 2004–2007: «Send Message» ===
In the beginning of 2004, Natalia became the producer and the leading program "Chance" on the TV channel "Inter". In late November, the singer presents the album "The Most ... Most" in the Kyiv club "Dejavu".

In January and December 2005 there is a presentation of clips "You know" and "There is no truth in the words". In May 2005, she participated in the annual Tavria Games festival.

In 2006, Natalia hosted a presentation of the Ukrainian-language album "Send a Message". That same year, she and her partner, Vlad Yama, took part in the TV project "Dancing with the Stars", where she won the second place and the first place in the Star Duo project (along with the producer of "Chances" Ihor Kondratiuk).

2007 – filming a clip for the song "This dance", presentation of the same name album and the eponymous tour of the country, along with a partner on "Dances ..." by Vladyslav Yama. Solo concert in Kyiv within the framework of the tour "This dance". In autumn, Natalia and Vlad took part in the third season of "Dancing with the Stars", where they again took second place.

In June 2007, she announced the release of the "Chance" program, where she had been leading for 10 years. However, after switching the project to the 1 + 1 TV channel, Mohylevska returned to the project with which she successfully cooperated in 2008.

=== 2008–2012: Star Factories ===
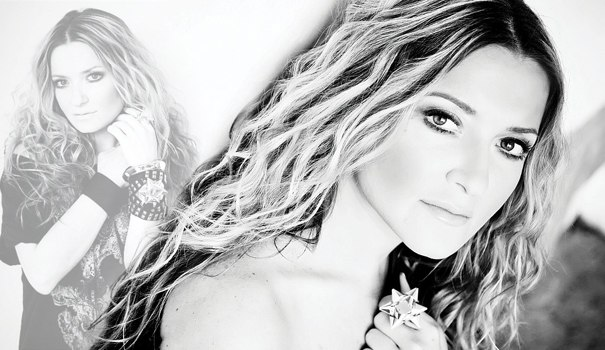
Press photo, 2009

In the summer of 2008, the Novyi Kanal invited Natalia Mohylevska to become the music producer of the second season of the "Factory of Stars".

After the huge success of the Factory of Stars – 3, produced by Konstantin Meladze, the New Channel launched a grand project "Factory of Stars. Superfinal ", in which one of the members of the jury was Natalia Mohylevska (except for her – the director general of the" New Channel "Irina Lysenko and producer Konstantin Meladze).

In 2010, on TV channel "1 + 1" the teleproject "Star + Star" was launched. Mohylevska became a co-host of the show with Yuriy Horbunov.

=== 2013–2018: "Tantsi z zirkamy (season 5)" ===
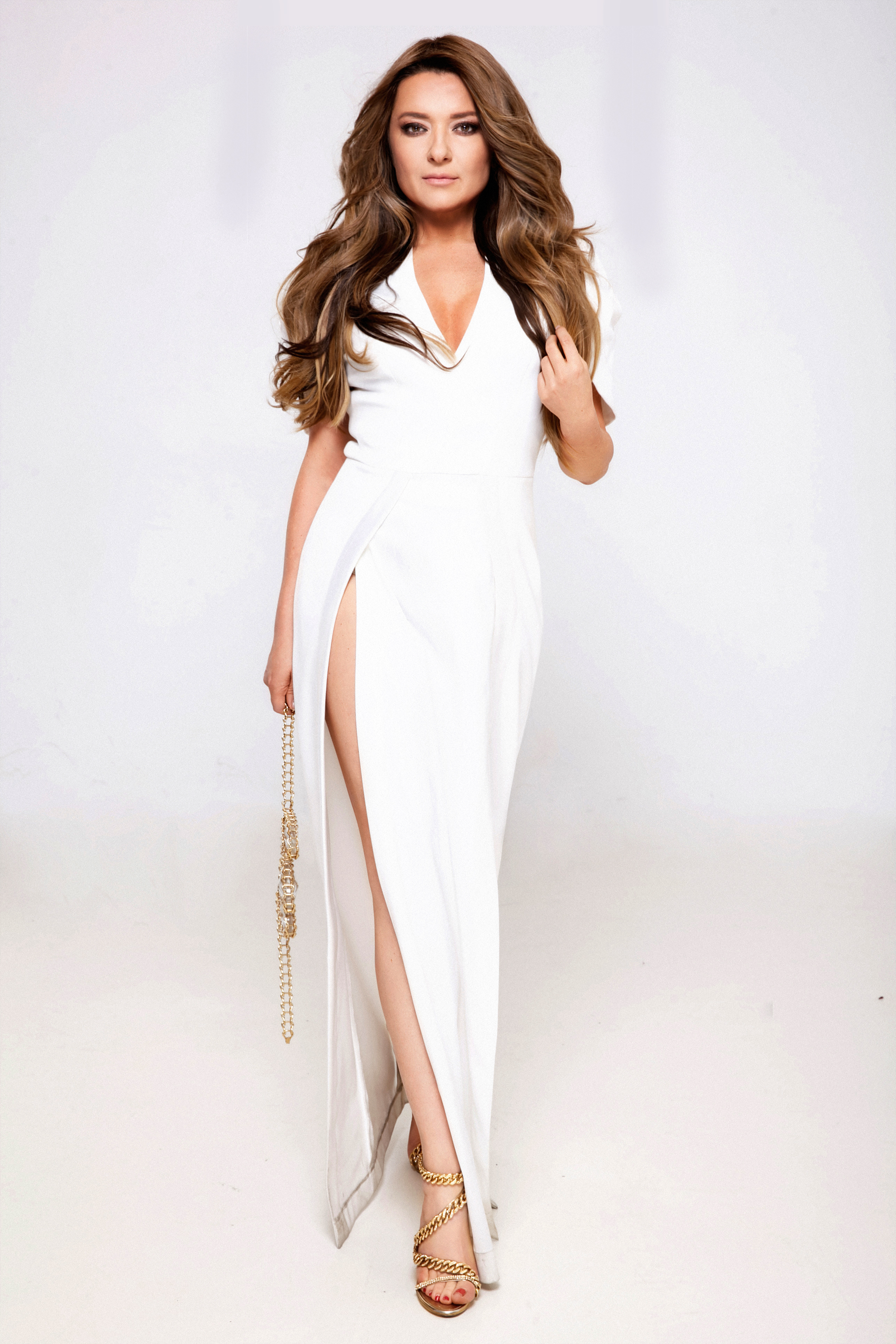
Press photo from 2016

In 2013, Natalia presented a mini-album "On-Line Project", which included 6 songs.

On February 1, 2015, Natalia took part in the filming of the second season of the vocal show "Voice Children "as coach. On October 11, 2015, the premiere of the children's talent show "Little Giants" took place on the TV channel "1 + 1" where she was a member of the jury.

In 2017, along with Monatik released a Russian-language single "Ya zavelas" On August 27, on the TV channel "1 + 1", a premiere of the fourth season of "Dancing with the Stars" was held, where Natalia offered a court seat, but she refused and in return became a party. Couple with Ihor Kuzmenko, she won. In November, Natalia became the coach of the Voice of Children vocal show for the second time.

=== 2019–present: change of image and volunteering activities ===
After 2018, Mohylevska became known for experimenting with her visual style and musical performances. Starting with the 2022 Russian invasion of Ukraine, she has been volunteering to support the Armed Forces of Ukraine, and made several visits to the frontline.

== Musical style ==
Mohylevska is known for performing both modern pop songs and estrada music. Her repertoire includes compositions by other authors, for example Andriy Kuzmenko, S. Pidkaura, O. Yaholnyk and Yu. Rybchynskyi, as well as own songs.

== Personal life ==
Mohylevska is a yoga enthusiast, having adopted the practice after a visit to India. She has voiced her personal opposition to plastic surgery.

In August 2007 Mohylevska suffered a brain concussion and a broken arm as a result of a traffic accident in Kyiv.

Mohylevska and her husband Valentyn have two adoptive daughters, Mishel (born 2011) and Sofia (born 2020). In a 2012 interview she claimed to have lived with six civil partners previously, all of whom were Jewish, despite herself having no Jewish ancestry.

During the Russian invasion of Ukraine in 2022, Mohylevska lost her uncle, an inhabitant Mariupol, who died after his house was destroyed by the Russian shelling of the city. Her own house in Bucha was plundered by Russian soldiers.

== Discography and videography ==
=== Albums ===
- 1997: "La la la" (Ла-ла-ла)
- 1998: "Snowdrop" (Russian: Подснежник)
- 1999: "Only Me" (Ukrainian: Тільки я)
- 2001: "Not like that" (Нетакая)
- 2002: "Winter"
- 2003: "The best… The best" (Russian: Самое... самое)
- 2006: "Send Message" (Ukrainian: Відправила message)
- 2007: "This Dance" (Russian: Этот танец)
- 2008: "Loved" (Любила)
- 2013: "On-line Project"

=== Music videos ===
- "Lemon Lantern" (Russian: Лимонный фонарь)
- 2004: "Love Me As I Am" (Russian: Полюби меня такой)
- 2005: "You Know" (Ukrainian: Ти знаєш)
- 2005: "No Truth in Words" (Ukrainian: Немає правди в словах)
- 2007: "This Dance" (Russian: Этот танец)
- 2008: "I will say "Wow" (Russian: Я скажу "Вау") - with Filipp Kirkorov

== Celebs and awards ==
On April 19, 2001 Mohylevska was awarded the title "Honored Artist of Ukraine". On December 29, 2004, the President of Ukraine Leonid Kuchma granted Mohylevska the honorary title of "National Artist of Ukraine" with a separate decree for her significant personal contribution to the development of Ukrainian song art and high performing skills.

In 2007 Mohylevska was recognized as "Ukraine's most beautiful woman" by Viva magazine.

In 2011, she was nominated for the YUNA Award in the category "Best Performer" for her achievements in music for 20 years.

== Notes ==
Preceded by Ani Lorak	Most beautiful by VIVA! 2006; With: Oleksandr Shovkovskyi	Succeeded by Tina Karol
