= Yuriy Rybchynskyi =

Ukrainian poet and screenwriter (born 1945)

Hero of Ukraine People's Artist Yuriy Rybchynskyi
- Юрій Рибчинський
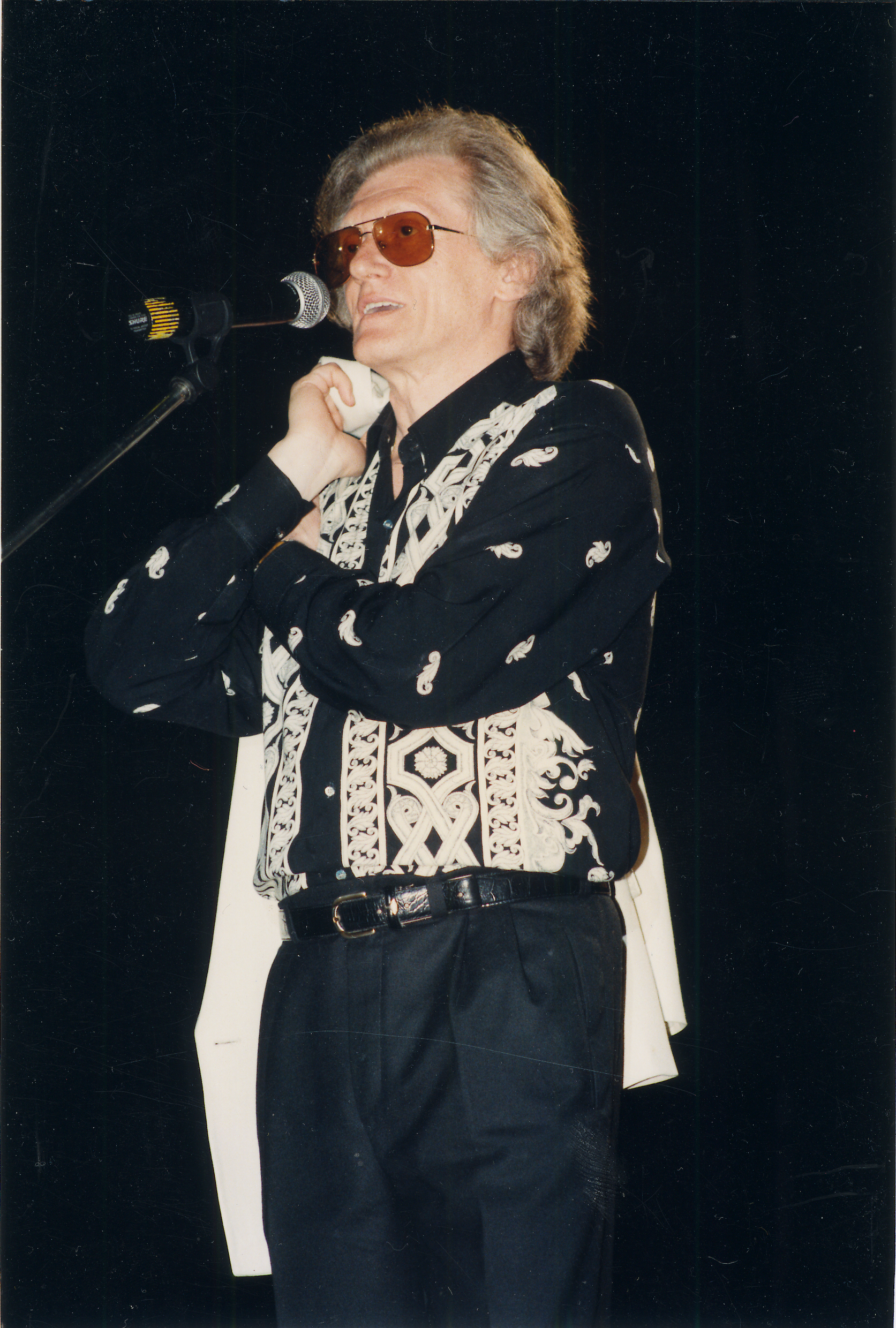
- Rybchynskyi in 2012
- Born: 22 May 1945 (age 81); Podil, Kyiv, USSR (now Ukraine)
- Education: Taras Shevchenko National University of Kyiv
- Occupations: Poet; songwriter; playwright
- Spouse: Alexandra Rybchynskaya
- Children: Yevhen Rybchynskyi
- Awards: see here

Yuriy Yevhenovych Rybchynskyi (Ukrainian: Юрій Євгенович Рибчинський; born 22 May 1945) is a Ukrainian poet, songwriter and playwright who is a recipient of both the title Hero of Ukraine and People's Artist of Ukraine. He was among the pioneers of contemporary Ukrainian pop music. Between 1998 and 2000, Rybchynskyi served as a cultural advisor to the President of Ukraine.

== Early life and education ==
Born on 22 May 1945, in the neighbourhood of Podil in Kyiv, Rybchynskyi attended an art school and enjoyed drawing as a youngster. In addition, he participated in athletics, leaping with a pole for eleven years starting from 1958. In the 1960s, Rybchynskyi began to take a serious interest in poetry. During the Khrushchev Thaw, all forms of art, including literature, were actively developing and society was experiencing a spiritual uplift. Unexpectedly, after the eighth grade, he began to write poems.

Rybchynskyi stated that he was incredibly lucky to have Les Taniuk as his first poetry teacher, however he is unsure of how his artistic life would have transpired. He was given his first collection of innocent childhood poetry. His writings first appeared in Ukrainian newspapers in Kyiv when he was a ninth grade student. Despite his young age, Rybchynskyi already knew at that time that he would major in philology. He enrolled at Taras Shevchenko National University of Kyiv in 1962.

== Career ==
=== Songwriting ===
Rybchynskyi's works were published in Yunost, when he was eighteen years old. But eventually, something occurred that, as Maestro acknowledges, fundamentally altered the course of the rest of his life. He was already twenty years old, uninterested in music, and incapable of picking up an instrument. Ihor Poklad, a young composer who was still a student at the conservatorium and had written numerous successful songs, including Kokhana (Sweetheart), was presented to him.

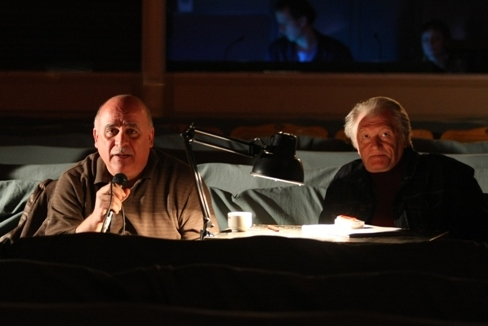
Igor Afanasyev and Rybchynskyi seen at a rehearsal in 2008

Since then, Rybchynskyi has developed into a songwriter in addition to a poet. Over the years, he collaborated on creative projects with a wide variety of composers. Volodymyr Ivasyuk, Ihor Poklad, Mykola Mozghovyi and Ihor Shamo are just a few notable personalities who collaborated with him to produce several hits in Ukrainian and Soviet pop music. Rubchynskyi's songs were performed at various times by Nina Matviienko, Nazariy Yaremchuk, Vasyl Zinkevych, Taisia Povaliy, Sofia Rotaru, Natalia Mohylevska, Ruslana Lyzhychko, Pavlo Zibrov, Tamara Gverdtsiteli, and several other well-known vocalists.

=== Playwriting ===
Rybchynskyi started writing plays in the middle of the 1970s. He and composer Vadym Ilin created musicals including Tovarysh Liubov (Comrade Liubov), Piznya Serenada (Late Serenade), Brekhukha (Liar), and Tvir Na Temu Kokhannia (An Essay On Love). Along with composer Mark Minkov, Rybchynskyi co-wrote the musical Bila Hvardiia (The White Guard, 1989), which was based on a novel by Mikhail Bulgakov. In 2005, he and composer Ihor Demarin co-wrote the rock opera The Perfumer, which was based on a novel by Patrick Süskind.

Many operetta theaters, especially in Odesa, Sverdlovsk, Moscow, Kyiv, and other places in Post-Soviet states featured Rybchynskyi's musicals with great popularity. In early 1980s he also composed plays for drama and musical theaters, including Judith, Tsar Irod (King Herod), Psy(Dogs), Edith Piaf. Zhyttia V Kredyt(Edith Piaf. Life On Credit), Mizh Misiatsem I Betkhovenom (Between the Moon and Beethoven), Zustrich Veteraniv Dytiachoho Khrestovogo Pokhodu (Meeting of the Veterans of the Children's Crusade). Rybchynskyi's 1985 drama The White Crow served as the inspiration for the first Ukrainian rock opera, which was co-written with composer Hennadii Tatarchenko and performed in 1991 at the Ivan Franko National Academic Drama Theater under the direction of Ukrainian director Serhii Danchenko.

== Books ==
Rybchynskyi has published the following poetry books:

- Tree Theater (1991)
- Train (2005)
- White Raven (2010)
- Insomnia (2010)
- CheLOVEk (2010)

== Personal life ==
Rybchynskyi noted in a 2007 interview that Tamara Gverdtsiteli is his favourite singer. His father was a banker and his mother was a military physician. His poetry examinations came as a surprise to his parents because all of the male line of his family enjoyed sketching.

== Awards and recognitions ==
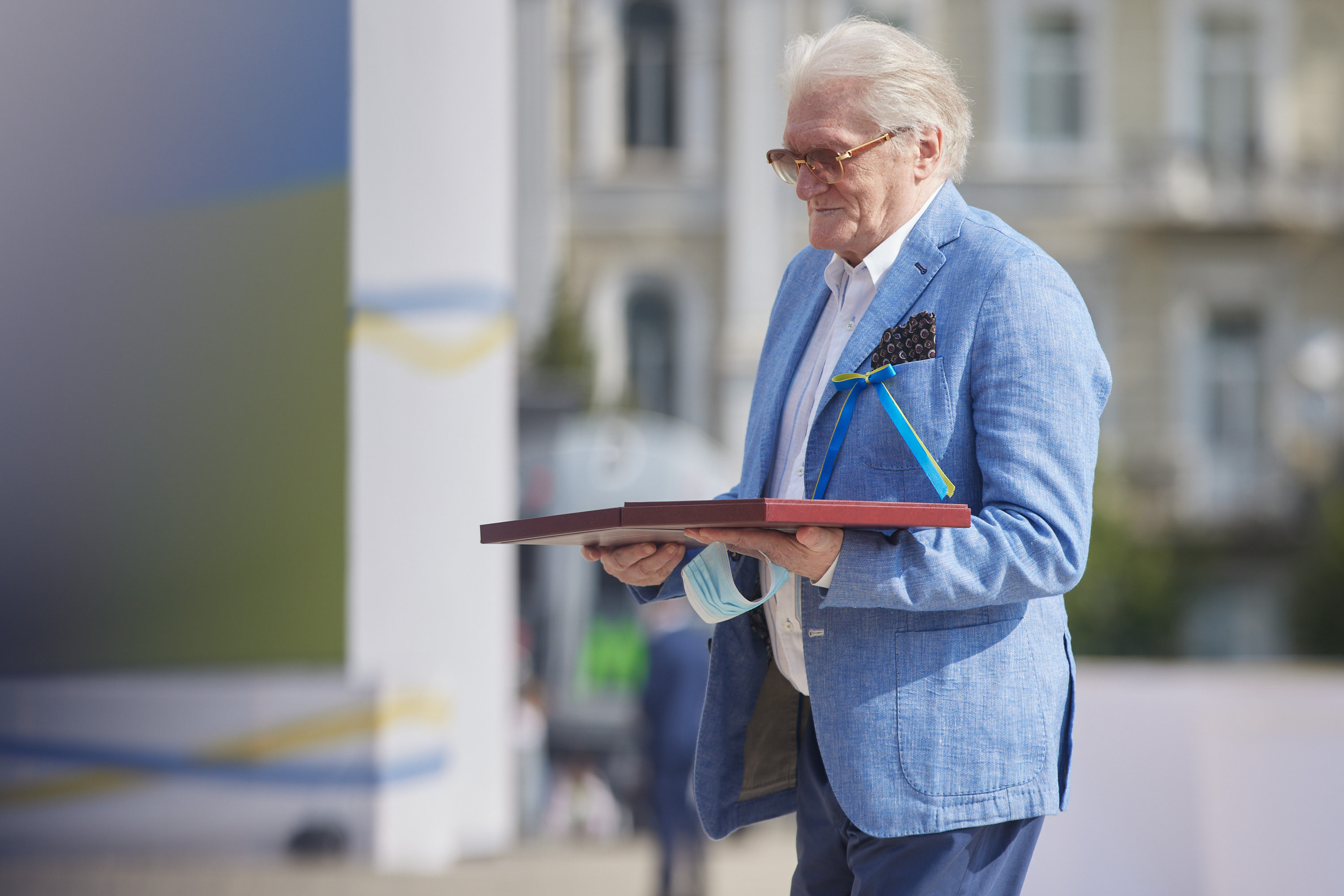
Rybchynskyi receiving his Hero of Ukraine award in 2020

Rybchynskyi was presented with the title Hero of Ukraine award by President Volodymyr Zelenskyy on 22 August 2020. He has received awards and recognitions such as:

- Hero of Ukraine Order of the State (22 August 2020)
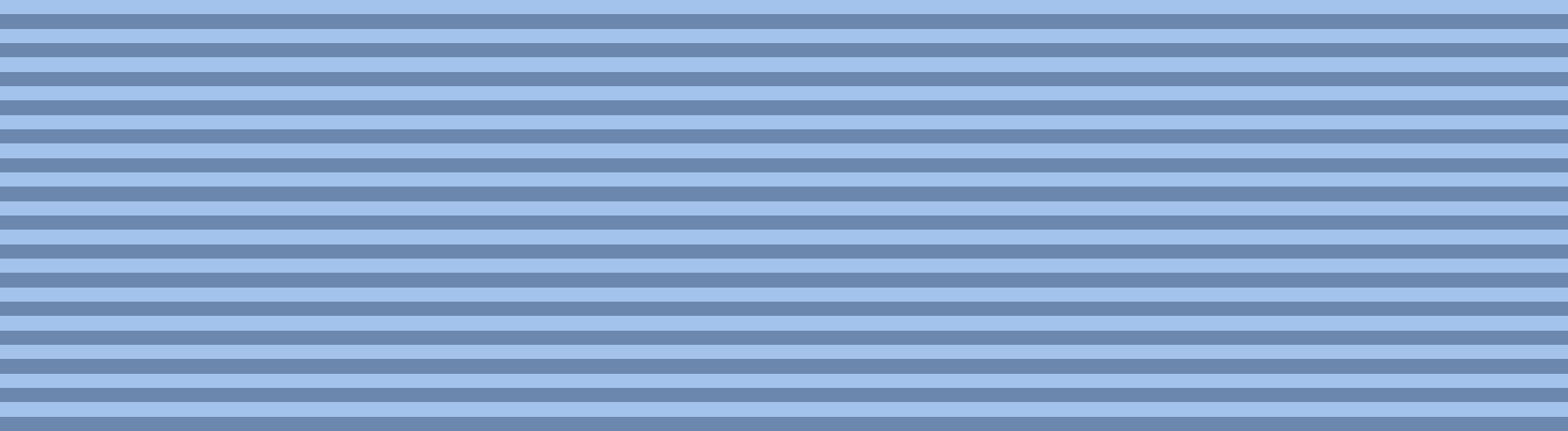
- Order of Prince Yaroslav the Wise Fifth Class (21 May 2015)
- People's Artist of Ukraine (25 May 2000)
- National Legend of Ukraine (20 August 2021)
- Honored Art Worker of Ukraine (29 June 1995)
- Laureate of the All-Union Competitions' Best Song of the Year (1972, 1974, 1976, 1978–80, 1983, 1987–89)
- Honorary Citizen of Kyiv (May 2009)
- Honorary Citizen of Orléans
