= Yuriy Tkach =

Ukrainian comedian and actor

- Юрій Ткач
- Born: October 9, 1983; Dnipropetrovsk, Ukrainian SSR, Soviet Union
- Education: National Metallurgical Academy of Ukraine; Alfred Nobel University
- Spouse: Victoria Tkach
- Children: Liza Tkach

Yuriy Kostyantynovych Tkach (born October 9, 1983) (Ukrainian: Юрій Костянтинович Ткач) is a Ukrainian comedian and actor. He is known for his acting roles in the Ukrainian sitcoms Country U and Once Upon a Time Near Poltava, and has been a participant on the reality shows Tantsi z zirkamy and Laughter League.

== Biography ==
Yuriy Tkach was born in 1983 in the city of Dnipro (then known as Dnepropetrovsk) in the Ukrainian Soviet Socialist Republic.

He studied at the National Metallurgical Academy of Ukraine, where he organized the Dnepropetrovsk National Team to compete on KVN, a nationally televised comedy competition show. The group eventually rose to national and international prominence, placing third in the Ukrainian National Higher League of KVN in 2009 and becoming a silver medalist of the International Higher League of KVN in 2013.

In 2013, he was cast by Kvartal 95 Studio as the husband of a main character in the Ukrainian sitcom Country U. Soon after, in 2014, he accepted a lead position in the same role on the Country U spinoff Once Upon a Time Near Poltava, this time as one of the two lead roles along with his costar Irina Soponaru. Also in 2014, Tkach was cast in a lead role on the Kvartal 95 sitcom Stories U.

In 2017, he was a celebrity contestant on the Ukrainian version of Dancing with the Stars, Tantsi z zirkamy.

In 2018, Tkach became a judge and coach on Laughter League, a comedy competition show.

In 2019, he replaced Ihor Lastochkin as a judge on the Make the Comedian Laugh game show on 1+1. He became a contestant on the Ukrainian adaptation of Lip Sync Battle in 2021.

== Filmography ==
Year	Title	Type	Role
2013	Country U	TV show	Yurchik
2014	Once Upon a Time Near Poltava	TV show	Yurchik
2014	Stories U	TV show	Ivan Tsarevych
2017	Coco	Movie	Plaza Mariachi (in Ukrainian dubbing)
2018	Me. You. He. She	Movie	Seryoga

== See also ==
- Kvartal 95 Studio
- 1+1 (TV channel)
- Tantsi z zirkamy
- Volodymyr Zelenskyy
