= Olya Polyakova =

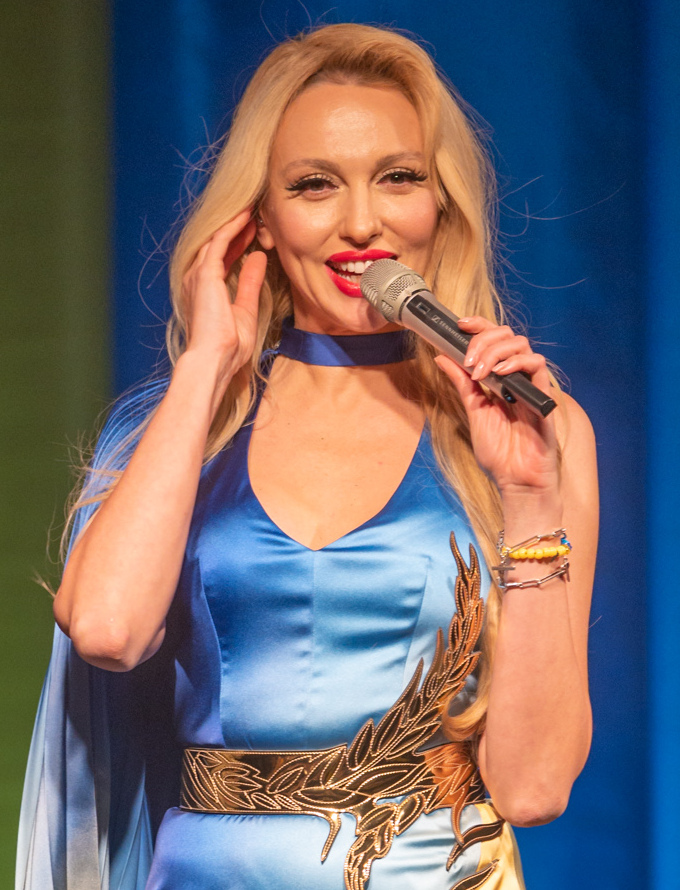
- Polyakova in Nuremberg in 2022

Background information
- Born: Olha Yuriivna Polyakova; 17 January 1979 (age 47); Vinnytsia, Ukrainian SSR, Soviet Union
- Genres: Pop, Dance Pop, Europop, Cabaret
- Occupations: Singer; TV presenter; actress
- Instrument: Piano
- Years active: 2005–present
- Labels: Moon Records; Best Music
- Website: www.olyapolyakova.com.ua

Olha Yuriivna Polyakova (Ukrainian: Ольга Юріївна Полякова; born 17 January 1979) is a Ukrainian singer, TV presenter, and comedian known as Super Blonde.

== Career ==
At 15, she began her singing career at Bakhus (Bacchus) restaurant on Kyivska Street in Vinnytsia.

In 2008, she released her eponymous song Super Blonde (Russian: Суперблондинка, romanized: Superblondinka).

In 2012, she took part in the Ukrainian national competition for the Eurovision Song Contest.

Polyakova won several music awards in Ukraine, including the 2016 M1 Music award.

The Ukraine Minister of Culture had her sing for Viktor Yanukovych.

After Russia annexed Crimea in 2014, she increased her concerts in Ukraine. While other Russian language singers left for Russia, she has stated that she does not want to go to Russia, not even to visit her mother who lives in Moscow.

In 2017 on season 4 of Tantsi z zirkamy (Ukrainian: Танці з зірками) which is Ukraine's Dancing with the Stars, she competed against nine others. The next year on season 5, she appeared as a guest host.

In February 2017, she hosted Kateryna Osadcha's Svitske Zhyttya or Svitske Life ("High Life", svitsketv sometimes spelled Svetskaya Zhezn) (Ukrainian: "Світське життя") (Russian: «Светская жизнь»), a program on channel "1 + 1", during which she stated that Yuriy Horbunov (Ukrainian: Юрій Горбунов) (Russian: Юрий Горбунов) helped her so that she could host Svitske Life. (Note: Svitsky Zhettya or Svitske Life (“High Life”) had its first show on channel "1 + 1" in 2008. Previously, it was aired on First National (Ukrainian: «Перший національний»), which is known as "UA: The first" (Ukrainian: UA:Перший) since 2015 and will be renamed "Suspilne TV" ("Public Television") (Ukrainian: Суспільне ТБ) in 2021, and Tonis (Ukrainian: Тоніс) channels.) During the Corona virus pandemic in July 2020, she performed White Dance (Ukrainian: Белый танец) in a concert on the premiere episode of the 15th season of Svitske Life ("High Life"). In April 2021 on the show Svitske Life, Osadcha interviewed Polyakova while she and her family were vacationing in Turkey.

In February 2018, she was named the most beautiful woman of the year by Viva! magazine.

In 2018, she founded the political party Blonde Party and is its chairperson. She stated that she wants to become president of Ukraine someday and would increase women's issues in Ukraine while president.

In September 2019, she and Andre Tan (Ukrainian: Андре Тан) released a line of clothing called "Queen of the Night" (Ukrainian: "Королева ночі"). She stated, "Tan is the most famous Ukrainian designer with the coolest management. He is the only fashion designer whose stores are located in almost every city. And if I want to sell my collection everywhere, then with whom, then, if not with him? We need to work with the best!" (Russian: "Тан – самый известный украинский дизайнер с самым крутым менеджментом. Он единственный модельер, магазины которого находятся практически в каждом городе. А если я хочу продавать свою коллекцию везде, так с кем же тогда, если не с ним? Нужно работать с лучшими!") When developing the collection Tan stated:

"I am always inspired by the virgins, who have a lot of fire and energy. Olya is a hurricane girl, a real tsunami. That's why, a couple of years ago, when I invited her to become the face of my new collection, I already knew that together we would create something explosive and now is the time. Agree, wearing a cap with a crown on your head is a challenge and at the same time our goal is for every girl who puts on our things to be a queen." (Russian: "Меня всегда вдохновляют девы, в которых много огня и энергии. Оля - девушка-ураган, настоящее цунами. Именно поэтому, когда я пару лет назад предложил ей стать лицом своей новой коллекции, я уже тогда знал, что мы вместе создадим что-то взрывоопасное. И вот это время пришло. Согласитесь, носить кепку с короной на голове - это вызов и одновременно наша цель. Ведь каждая девушка, которая надевает наши вещи, сразу становится королевой.")

In addition to "Superblonde", she is often called "Ukrainian Lady Gaga", "kokoshnik on legs" (she is 1.8 meters (5 ft 11 in) tall), and the "longest legs of the country" of Ukraine (her legs are 1.27 meters (4 ft 2 in) long).

She is friends with Volodymyr Zelenskyy.

When asked "Superblondes are born or become?" Olya Polyakova replied, "This is a state of mind and, of course, a diagnosis from which every smart woman wants to recover. And I'm recovering quietly." (Note: In Russian: – Суперблондинками рождаются или становятся? – Это состояние души и, конечно же, диагноз, от которого каждая умная женщина хочет выздороветь. И я выздоравливаю потихонечку.)

Polyakova continued touring Ukraine despite an ongoing Russian invasion of Ukraine. For instance she gave a concert in metro station Vokzalna in Dnipro on 27 January 2023.

After February 24, 2022, the celebrity participated in the GIDNA project from Future for Ukraine Charity Foundation.

In 2023, Olya collaborated with Swedish band Army of Lovers on the song "Love is Blue".

On January 17, 2024, on her 45th birthday, Olya Polyakova released her album "100% UA." The album includes Ukrainian-language versions of her most famous songs, such as "Shlyopki," "Koroleva Nochi," "Ey, Sekundochku!" and others.

On May 15, 2026, Polyakova released an album Zhinka Z іkavym Maybutnim. She also stated that after the album's release, she plans to pause her creative activity in Ukraine in order to try herself on the British music market. According to her, she is working on English-language material in collaboration with British songwriters and producers. On May 17, the premiere of Polyakova's new project, The Nogi, which she launched with her husband, Vadim Buryakovsky, took place at the Peppers Club in Kyiv. As the singer elaborated, The Nogi is a space where you can “speak more frankly than usual.”.

== Personal life ==
Polyakova is married to Vadym Polyakov, who is 15 years her senior. They have two daughters Maria (b. 2005) and Alice (b. 2011). Their home is Kyiv because that is where she has called her home the longest.

She was born in Vinnitsa, Ukrainian SSR, Soviet Union. At 3 months old, her 43 year old maternal grandmother began raising Olya Polyakova in Vinnitsa as if Olya was her third child while her mother attended medical school. Her maternal grandmother continued to care for Olya Polyakova while her mother and stepfather were traveling on business trips. Her maternal grandfather, a medical doctor, died when Olya Polyakova was six years old. She spent most of her childhood with her maternal grandmother in a house with chickens and a garden. She told her grandmother when she was seven that she wanted to start studying music and that Olya Polyakova would have to pay for music school which she attended the Vinnytsia School of Culture and Arts until graduating 9th grade. Her family wanted her to attend medical school but Olya went to music school in Kyiv, instead, attending Kyiv National University of Culture and Arts and Petro Tchaikovsky National Music Academy of Ukraine where she received a degree as an opera singer. When she was eight, she performed in several roles on Yeralash (Russian: киножурнал "Ералаш").

Her father, the son of a neurosurgeon, was a musician. Her father and her mother met while her mother was attending medical school where her paternal grandfather was a professor. All of her grandparents are doctors. Her paternal grandfather studied with Yuri Senkevich at the Military Medical Academy in Leningrad, Soviet Union.

Her mother (b. 1959), a pediatrician, has had a house in Vinnitsa since Olya was 15 year old but lives in Moscow and teaches at the diplomatic academy in Moscow after her return with her stepfather from Uruguay. After childhood, Olya Polyakova was much older when her mother married her stepfather. After her stepfather's death, her mother has dated a diplomat.

Her stepfather (b. 1949) was a senior diplomat posted to Hispanic countries (e.g. Spain and Latin America): Cuba as a consul of the Soviet Union for five years who established relations between the Soviet Union and Cuba, Mexico, and his last station was Uruguay before his death. Because her stepfather was good friends with not only Raúl Castro and Pablo Escobar but also Fidel Castro, her godfather is fabled to be Fidel Castro.

== Discography ==
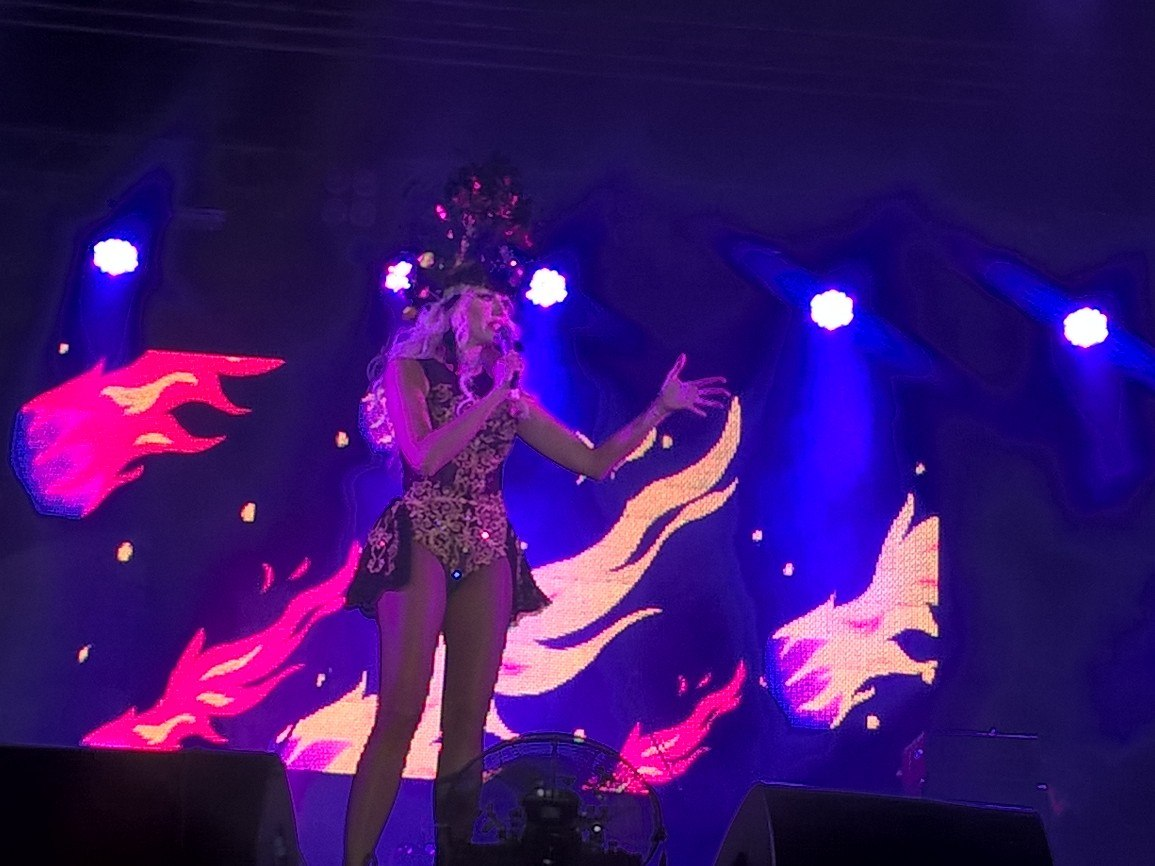
Polyakova at a concert in Melitopol in 2016

Studio albums

- Приходи ко мне (2001)
- Шлёпали шлёпки (2017)
- Королева ночи (2019)

Singles

- 2013: "#Шлёпки" (#Slippers)
- 2013: "Russian Style"
- 2013: "Люли" (Lyuli)
- 2013: "Мальчикам это нравится" (Boys like it)
- 2014: "Асталависта, сепаратиста!" (Astalavista, seperatista!)
- 2014: "Брошенный котёня" (Abandoned kitten)
- 2015: "Любовь-морковь" (Love-carrot)
- 2015: "Первое лето без него" (The first summer without him)
- 2016: "О Боже, как больно!" (Oh God, how painful!)
- 2016: "#Плавочки" (#Swimwear)
- 2017: "Номер один" (Number one)
- 2017: "Бывший" (Former)
- 2018: "Мама" (Mama)
- 2018: "Королева Ночи" (Queen of the Night)
- 2018: "Любовница" (Mistress)
- 2019: "Лёд тронулся" (The ice has broken)
- 2019: "Звонила" (I called)
- 2019: "Эй, секундочку" (Hey, wait a second)
- 2019: "Ночная жрица" (Night priestess)
- 2020: "Белый танец" (White dance)
- 2021: "Взрослая девочка" (grown up girl)

== Notes ==
| Preceded by Tina Karol | Most beautiful by VIVA! 2018; With: Oleh Vynnyk | Vacant title suspended |
