= Victoria Bulitko =

Ukrainian actress (born 1983)

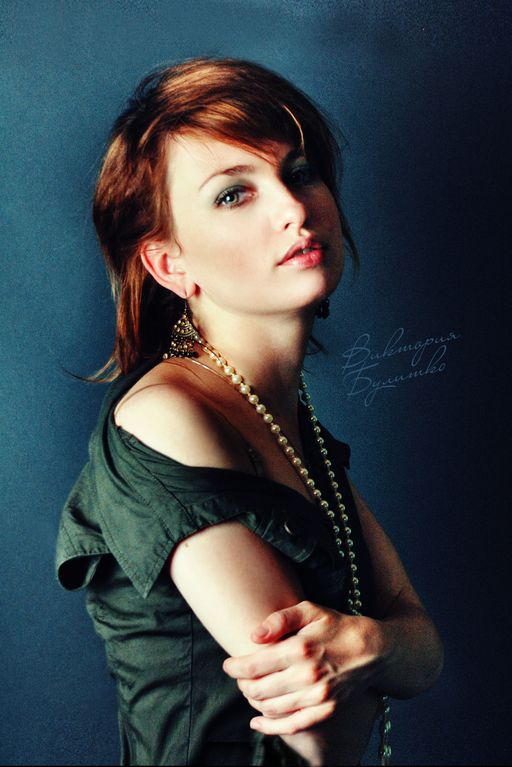
- Born: Булітко Вікторія; 25 January 1983 (age 43); Zaporizhzhia, Ukrainian SSR, USSR
- Citizenship: Ukraine
- Education: Zaporizhzhya National University
- Occupations: Actress, singer-songwriter, musician
- Years active: 2000–present
- Awards: "Kyiv Pectoral", "Person of the Year 2012" (Ukrainian award)
- Website: bulitka.com

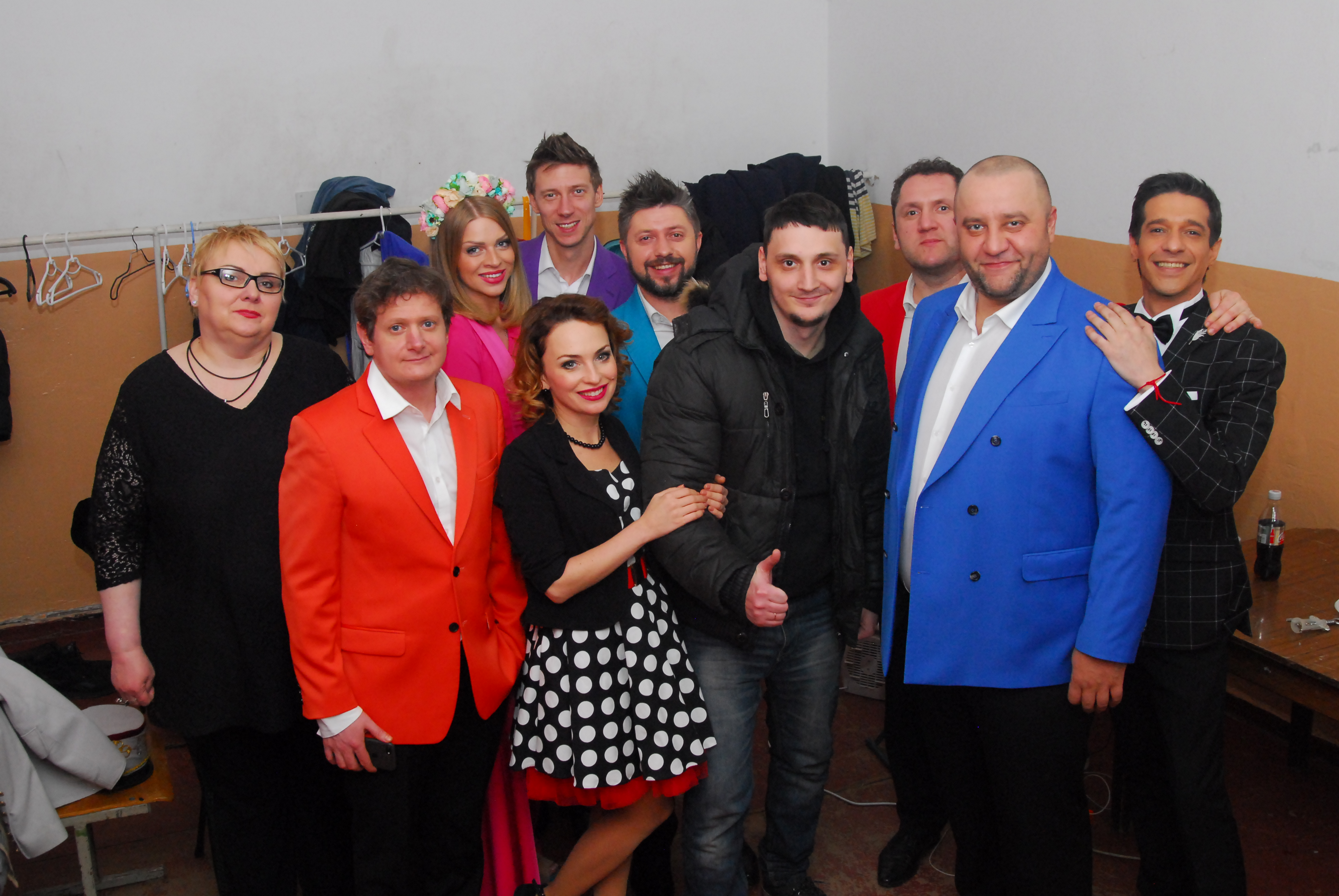
Dizel Studio

Victoria Bulitko (Ukrainian: Булітко Вікторія Сергіївна; born 25 January 1983) is a Ukrainian film, television and theater actress.

== Biography ==
Bulitko was born on 25 January 1983 in Zaporizhzhia, Ukrainian SSR, USSR. She graduated from the theater department of Zaporizhzhia National University, specializing in film and theater acting. From 2009, she acted in the Kyiv Academic Drama Theater in Podil. She has appeared in over 30 films and television shows. She is also a well known member of "Diezel Studio".

== Filmography ==
- 2012 – "Diamond Cross" (film)
- 2012 – "Diary of a pregnant woman" (main) (TV) Season 1
- 2012 – "Three Sisters" (main) (TV) season 4–6
- 2011 – "Three Sisters" (main) (TV) season 1–3
- 2011 – "The route of mercy" (TV series)
- 2011 – "Tales Mityaya" (TV series)
- 2010 – "Pretty Woman" (main) (TV)
- 2010 – "According to the law" (TV series)
- 2010 – "Return of Mukhtar 2" (TV series)
- 2009 – "Muhtar's return" (TV series)
- 2009 – "World of Sony" (TV series)
- 2009 – "Dureyter" (TV series)
- 2008 – "Escape from New Life" comedy (film)
- 2008 – "Danger envy" (TV series)
- 2008 – "Aliens mistakes" (TV series)
- 2007 – "Veseli usmіshki" (TV series) (Ukraine)
