= Vladyslav Yama =

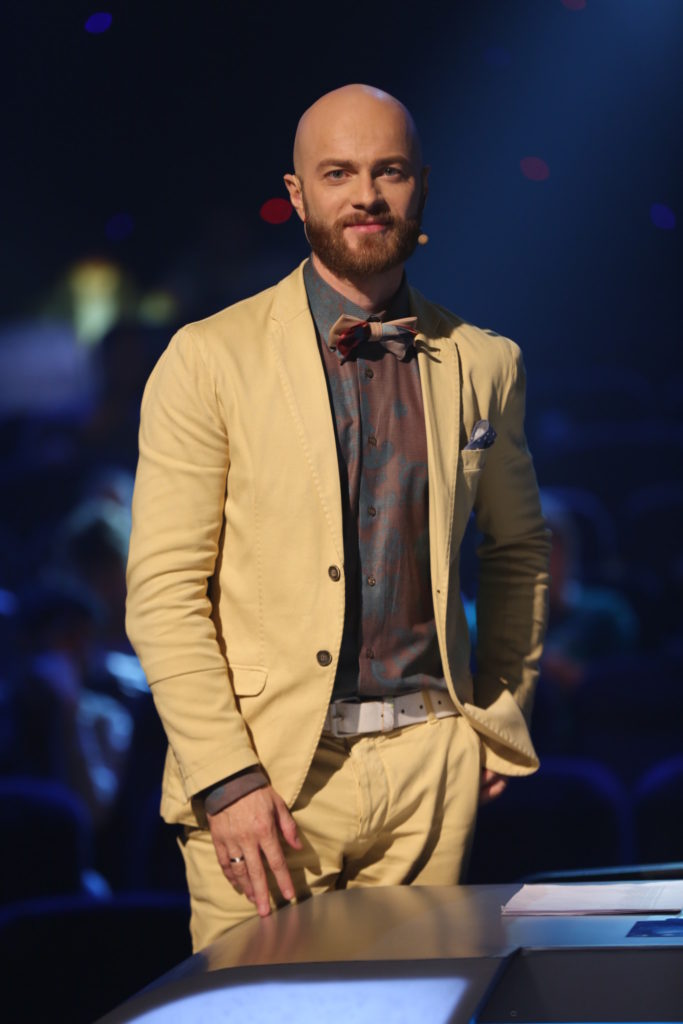
- Born: Vladyslav Mykolaiovych Yama; July 10, 1982 (age 43); Zaporizhzhia, Ukrainian SSR, Soviet Union
- Occupations: Dancer, Educator, Judge for Ukraine's Got Talent and Tantsi z zirkamy
- Known for: Ukraine's Got Talent, Tantsi z zirkamy

Vladyslav Mykolaiovych Yama (Ukrainian: Владисла́в Микола́йович Я́ма), also known as Vlad Yama (Ukrainian: Влад Яма; born July 10, 1982, in Zaporizhzhia), is a Ukrainian dancer, educator, and is one of three judges for Ukraine's Got Talent, Tancyuyut Vsi! and Tantsi z zirkamy.

He has one older brother, Dmitry (born 1975) who works as a lawyer in Odesa. Yama is a graduate of Zaporizhzhia National University, where he earned his degree in physical education.

== Career ==
Yama started dancing at the age of 7. He first made his debut in a dance group known as "Krok", and shortly moved on to dance in another group called "Fiesta". He also teaches choreography at Kyiv University and dance.
