= Pavlo Zibrov =

Ukrainian pop singer, song writer

- Павло Зібров
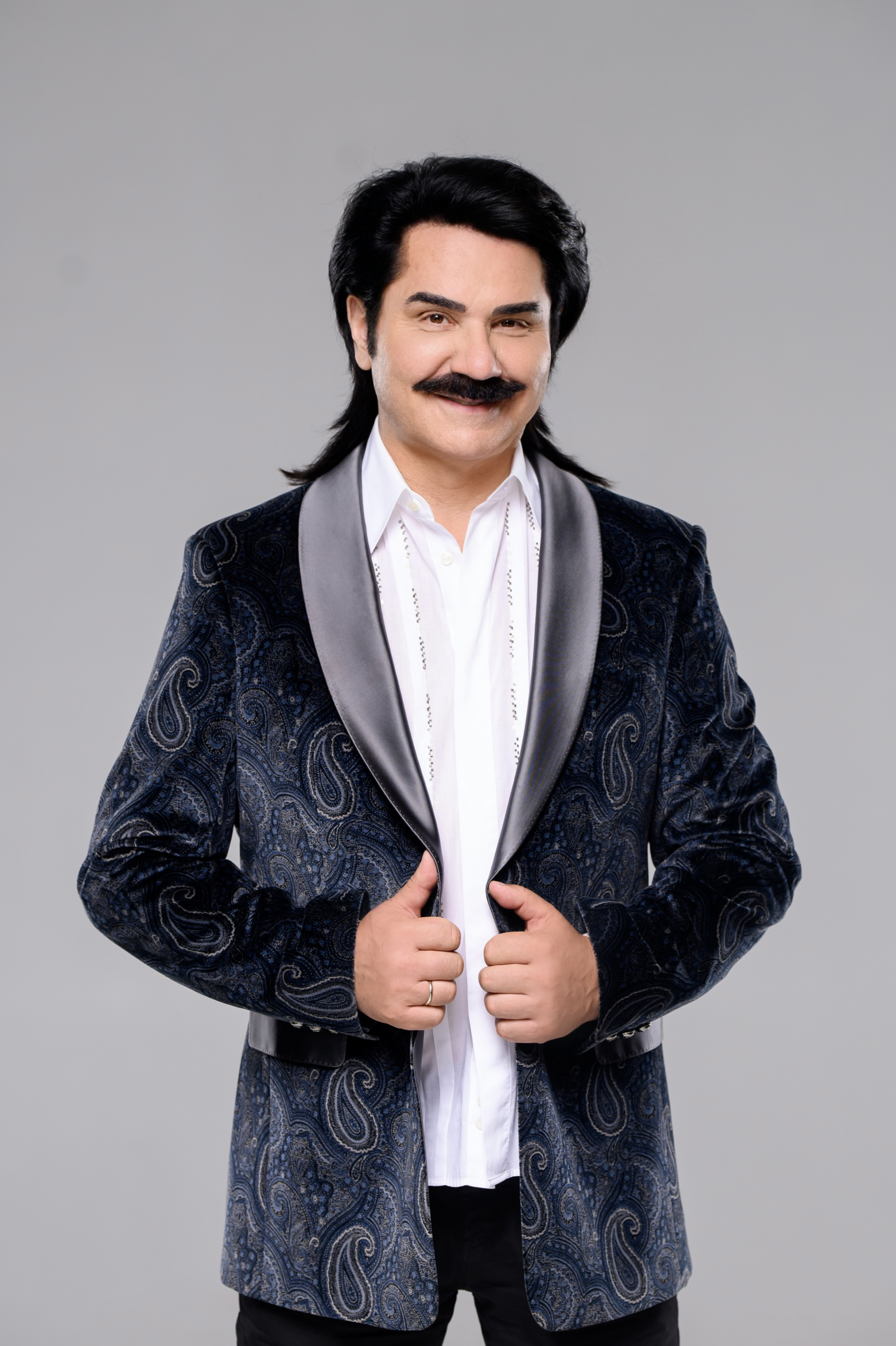
- Zibrov in 2023
- Born: 21 June 1957 (age 68)
- Occupation: Singer
- Musical career
- Instrument: Vocals

Pavlo Mykolaiovich Zibrov (Ukrainian: Павло Миколайович Зібров; born 21 June 1957) is a Ukrainian pop singer (baritone), songwriter. People's Artist of Ukraine (1996). He became notable for his song Khreshchatyk co-written with Yuriy Rybchynskyi.

Pavlo Zibrov was born on 21 June 1957 in a village of Chervone, Nemyriv Raion (now Haisyn Raion), Vinnytsia Oblast in a family of Russian Nikolai Ivanovich and Ukrainian Hanna Kyrilivna. His mother worked as a teacher, and his father was a master of all trades. After a couple of years at school, Pavlo moved with his family to Kyiv. He graduated from the Kyiv Lysenko special music boarding school which he started sometime in 1965, while his brother attended a military-music college in Moscow. In 1981, Zibrov graduated from the orchestra department of Kiev State Conservatory of Tchaikovsky and in 1992, the vocal department.

From 1986 to 1993, he was a vocalist of the State symphony orchestra of Ukraine. Since 1994, Zibrov is a director of his own Pavlo Zibrov Theater of Song and instructor at the department of pop singing of the Kyiv National University of Culture and Arts.
