= Frolova =

Frolova may refer to one of the following:

People

- Anna Frolova (born 2005), Russian single skater
- Elena Frolova, singer, composer and poet
- Inna Frolova, a rower from Ukraine, an Olympic medalist
- Lyudmila Frolova, a field hockey player and Olympic medalist
- Marina Frolova-Walker, British musicologist and music historian
- Nina Frolova, a Soviet rowing cox
- Olga Frolova, a linguist
- Slava Frolova, a Ukrainian TV presenter
- Tamara Frolova, a Russian politician

Other

- 6165 Frolova, an asteroid
