= Kseniya Simonova =

Ukrainian artist (born 1985)

- Ксенія Симонова
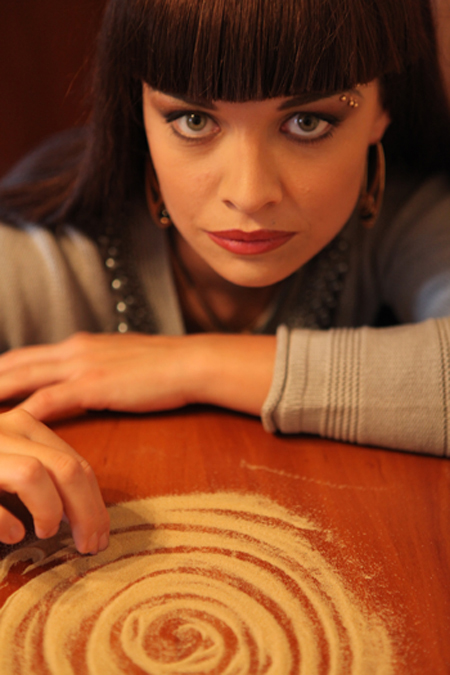
- Kseniya Simonova in 2010
- Born: Kseniya Oleksandrivna Simonova; 22 April 1985 (age 41); Yevpatoria, Crimea, Ukrainian SSR, USSR
- Education: Tavrida National V.I. Vernadsky University (2007) (2008)
- Known for: Sand painting; sand animation; performance artist; film director; illustrator
- Spouse: Igor Paskar (m. 2007)
- Children: 3
- Awards: Winner of Ukraine's Got Talent
- Website: simonova.tv

Kseniya Oleksandrivna Paskar (Ukrainian: Ксенія Олександрівна Паскар; née Simonova; Ukrainian: Си́монова; born 22 April 1985) is a Ukrainian performance artist; she is involved in sand animation, graphic design, illustration, cinema, and literature. She is a Merited Artist of Ukraine and rose to prominence in 2009 after winning Ukraine's Got Talent. She is the only one to receive two Golden Buzzers on two "The Champions" series of the Got Talent franchise: America's Got Talent: The Champions and Britain's Got Talent: The Champions, both in 2019.

== Early life ==
Simonova was born in 1985, in Yevpatoria, a city on the Crimean peninsula which at the time was a part of the Soviet Union. Her mother, Irina Simonova, is an artist, a theatrical designer, and teacher of fine arts. Her father, Alexander Simonov, is a former military officer who owns a furniture design company. Since she was a child, Kseniya painted, drew, and designed with her mother.

Kseniya Simonova's parents discouraged her from a career as an artist. She said, "It is a constant struggle. I knew that and was ready for it. (If you choose) this profession, you're struggling all your life. You do not enjoy everyday life-like comfort, and buying furniture... You're always looking for something more... I was never interested in a life of comfort and buying furniture."

In 2007 Simonova married Igor Paskar, a theatre director, journalist, and magazine editor. They have two sons.

== Education and early career ==
Simonova graduated from the Artistic School of Yevpatoria and studied at the School of Fine Arts, where she wrote research papers on English folk poetry as well as 15th and 16th century English folk songs and ballads. She translated folk poetry and poets including William Shakespeare, Robert Burns, and George Gordon Byron. In 2002, she pursued a major in psychology and graduated from the Tavrida National V.I. Vernadsky University in Kyiv in 2007 with honors and a scientific specialization in psychophysiology. While studying the sciences, Simonova also entered the Ukrainian Academy of Printing in 2003, where she studied graphic design. She graduated in 2008, six months after her first son was born.

Since 2006 Simonova has worked for the magazine Crimean Riviera as an artist. In 2007, Simonova and Paskar launched a bilingual magazine, Chocolate in English and Russian, which ceased production a year later due to the financial crisis.

== Sand stories ==
Sand performance was suggested by Paskar. Initially, Simonova was unsure but decided to try it in the absence of other viable options to improve the family's financial situation. When tests with both beach and river sands proved to not be suitable, Paskar researched better options on the Internet selling his printing equipment to buy three kilograms of expensive volcanic sand.

=== Ukraine's Got Talent ===
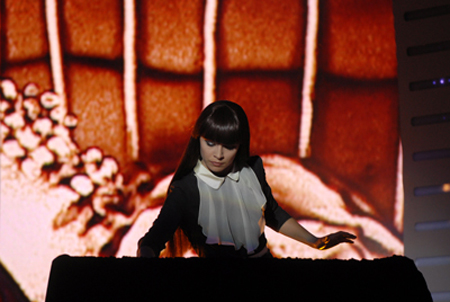
A sand story by Simonova

Paskar suggested to Simonova that she should enter the competition Ukraine's Got Talent. The prize was ₴1 million, the equivalent of US$110,000, and she decided to participate.

She presented a two-minute sand story and became a semi-finalist. She wanted to perform a World War II sand story, but the producers encouraged her to choose a more popular theme. She refused, saying, "I... want to bring some immortal sense to this show. Not just pictures or video clips. Something close to all hearts." The sand story Simonova performed was an eight-minute story of a young couple separated by the war. In an interview she said, "It was so emotionally hard, and I now still can not think about those minutes without pain... My hands were dying and reviving making the images." She advanced to the finals. In the third round, she performed a sand story: Don't be too late!

She was declared the winner of the competition and collected 100,000 euros. The Guardian called her an online phenomenon after the video of her performance was viewed more than 2 million times on YouTube. After the competition, she became an international artist performer and performed sand art in many countries. With the money she won, Simonova and Paskar bought a house in Yevpatoria; they received invitations from around the world to perform.

=== International artist performer ===
Since 2009, Simonova has performed her sand animation stories in Europe, China, Qatar, India, Australia, Thailand, and Bhutan. She introduced her art at events such as Eurovision Song Contest in 2011 and the Champion League Final Gala in Milan in 2016. Simonova has performed with presidents and royalty in the audience including for the President of Malta George Abela; Her Majesty Queen Margrethe II of Denmark; Princess Sirindhorn of Thailand, Princess Marie of Denmark; Princess Lalla Hasna of Morocco; members of the British royal family, and others.

=== Further Got Talent appearances ===
In 2019, Simonova auditioned for America's Got Talent: The Champions. She received a golden buzzer from host Terry Crews sending her directly to the finals of the competition. Her performance in the finals, Love Always Wins, was lauded by the judges. Simon Cowell called it "one of the most beautiful acts in the history of Got Talent". She finished in third place on the show.

In August 2019 Simonova was announced as a confirmed act for Britain's Got Talent: The Champions on ITV. The show began on 31 August 2019 and ran for six weeks. She appeared in the first episode and performed a sand story called "Never Give Up". She received a Golden Buzzer from one of the judges, Amanda Holden; Simonova was the first act to receive two Golden Buzzers on "The Champions" series of the Got Talent franchise. In the final competition she performed a sand and snow story of Princess Diana and came in third in the Grand Finale.

== World renowned sand stories ==
=== Live or real-time performances ===
Since 2009, Simonova has been invited to perform at select events worldwide. In the end of 2009, she performed her sand story "Planet of Childhood" in the capital of Malta, Valletta, at the live charity marathon L'Istrina at the invitation of the president of Malta, George Abela.

In 2010, Simonova performed at the Victory Day Gala at the Royal Albert Hall in London as a special guest with her sand storiesYou Are Always Nearby and I Remember. In 2011 in Monte Carlo, her sand story Chess opened the Amber chess tournament, which was appreciated by Albert II, Prince of Monaco.

In April 2011, Simonova created a sand story, Lady Dior Moscow, for Christian Dior and performed it for the opening of a Dior-themed exhibition in Moscow. It was received well by fashion experts and Russian model Natalia Vodianova. In 2013, the film appeared in the 15 best fashion short films according to Paste. In 2011, Simonova was a special guest at a number of big galas with symphony orchestras where she created "The Four Seasons" in sand(June 2011, Florence). She was also a special guest with her performance at the Special Olympic Games' closing ceremony in Athens where she portrayed the history of Greece in sand.

In July 2011, Vodianova invited Simonova to be a special guest with her sand story at the Love Ball charity sponsored by her and the Naked Heart Foundation in Paris. Simonova performed a specially-crafted sand story about the life and charity impact of Vodianova. In January 2012, Simonova was a special guest for the Thailand anniversary ceremonies in Bangkok at the invitation of the king of Thailand, Bhumibol Adulyadej, where she performed Long Live the King! She was given presents by the princess. In return, Simonova presented the princess with two discs which show "Long Live the King!" She shot it in her studio with Thai Ovation TV. The film "Long Live the King!" was viewed 1.5 million times on YouTube.

Simonova performed in Tokyo with Life Always Wins, which is devoted to the 2011 Tōhoku earthquake and tsunami as well as other sand stories. During UEFA Euro 2012 in Ukraine, she performed in a concert featuring sand art at the St. Sophia Square in Kyiv with proceeds supporting the Ukraine national football team. She was a special guest of the international cultural fest Wadden Sea in Denmark under the patronage of Her Highness Princess Marie of Denmark, where the Danish government organized a set of concerts for Simonova. She was complimented by the Princess during the festival (2012). In 2014 Simonova performed her sand stories with a symphony orchestra with Margrethe II of Denmark in the audience in Aalborg.

Since 2013, Simonova has created sand animation stories for Morocco Royal projects devoted to environment protection. One of them–a sand animation film "Beautiful Morocco", which is devoted to the history of kingdom and its environment protection, was viewed over 2 million times on YouTube. In 2016 she became a special guest of Morocco Awards gala under the patronage of Mohammed VI of Morocco.

In November 2015 in Thimphu, Bhutan, Simonova was a special guest at the ceremonies devoted to the 60th anniversary of Jigme Singye Wangchuk, father of Jigme Khesar Namgyel Wangchuk, who invited Simonova. She created a sand story, Gorgeous Bhutan. After the performance, both kings expressed their appreciation of her artwork. She was received by the royal couple–Jigme Khesar and Jetsun Pema in their palace and Khesar called Simonova his friend. In 2016, Simonova presented a film, "Astana, my love" devoted to the capital of Kazakhstan, Astana and depicting Kazakh nationhood, which was viewed over 30 thousand times within a few days on YouTube. She performed a sand animation about football in Milan at the gala presentation of the UEFA Champions League Cup, and created a sand animation video, Live, Serbia, which became popular in Serbia.

In 2017, she was invited to perform in the Belgrade National Theatre with her show devoted to Serbia. Her picture exhibition, Progress, organized in the central gallery of Belgrade traveled to the five biggest cities of Serbia. She was warmly received by the minister of culture of Serbia Vladan Vukosavljević. She was invited to bring her sand show to Belgrade. In 2018, she performed in the biggest concert hall of Greece with sand stories about Greece. At the end of the year she performed six shows in Hong Kong which were viewed by more than 30,000 viewers.

== Sand stories and music collaboration ==
=== Collaboration with symphony orchestras ===
Simonova has performed her sand stories with symphony orchestras like the YouTube Symphony orchestra, Symphony Orchestra della Toscana, the Royal Philharmonic Orchestra of Aalborg, Belgium National Orchestra, and the orchestra of Wermland opera in Sweden. Simonova's performance in Sydney during the online gala of the YouTube Symphony orchestra, including sand art named Ascending Bird was viewed online 33 million times.

In 2017 Simonova performed with the Belgium National Orchestra conducted by Domingo Hindoyan, which played The Nutcracker. In 2018 she was a special guest performer of Wermland opera orchestra's Christmas concert. In August 2018 she performed as a special guest at the Verbier Festival in Switzerland with pianists Georgy Gromov and Maria Masycheva. They played Cinderella by Prokofiev, and Simonova recreated the story in sand. They repeated the performance in Berlin in December 2018.

=== Sand stories and popular music ===
In 2010, she collaborated with Japanese female singer-songwriter Fuyumi Abe, featuring in the music video of the single "Sora Ni Mau" performing sand art. In 2011, Simonova returned to television competition in another form, performing on stage at the Eurovision Song Contest 2011, during the performance of a Ukrainian entry by Mika Newton.

Simonova's sand art, Share Your Heart, was the backdrop for a Ukrainian entry at Eurovision 2011. She created a sand story for the song "Angel". They performed in the second semifinals and the finals. Ukraine came in fourth place. In an interview with Eurovision Radio International, she said that she devoted Share Your Heart to children of the Simferopol orphanage house which she helped in that period.

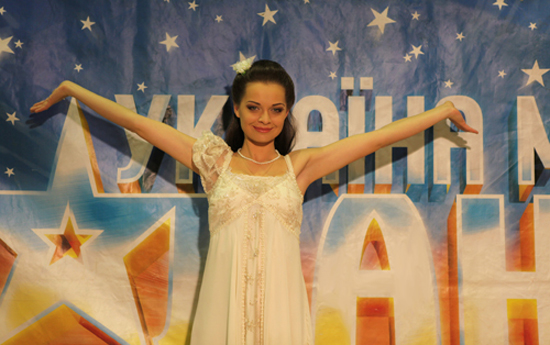
Simonova in May 2010

In 2012, Simonova collaborated with the youngest winner of the Grammy Awards, Esperanza Spalding. The result of cooperation was the sand story video for the song "Endangered Species" devoted to Amazonia nature protection. In 2014, she shot two clips for the British rock band Menace founded by ex-Napalm Death member Mitch Harris. The video for the song "To the Marrow" was filmed using a technique called "snow graphics". In 2014, she was featured in American R&B singer Joe's music video "If You Lose Her". In 2015, her sand art was the basis of a video clip for "The Wreck of the Edmund Fitzgerald", performed by Cadence, a Canadian acapella band.

In May 2019 Simonova participated in Eurovision Song Contest 2019 as a part of Team Moldova, and created a stage act for Moldovan singer Anna Odobescu, where she performed snow stories. In 2023 Simonova created a music video for folk/rock artist August Gilde's single 'Animals'

== Theatre ==
Since 2013, Simonova and her team have been working on their show The Past Side of the Future, which Simonova described as a "visual solo performance". In May 2015, the show premiered in Yevpatoriya.

== Other genres of art ==
=== Graphics ===
In addition to her sand stories, Simonova has been a graphic artist since 2005. In 2006, she founded her own style in graphics, psychoanalytic line graphics. She has worked in this style from 2006 to the present day.

=== Literature ===
Since her youth, Simonova has written poems and prose. In school, she was engaged in literary research in English folk ballads and poetic translations of ballads, folk songs and poems of Shakespeare, Robert Burns, and Lord Byron. In 2014, she released an autobiographical book Another Story, illustrated with her own drawings.

== Awards ==
- 2009 - "Person of the Year" finalist, nominated under "New Generation" in Kyiv
- 2013 - The title of Merited Artist of Ukraine
- 2016 - the title of "Artist of the Year" at the annual award Yevpatorian Awards
- 2018 - The Human Rights Medal for volunteer and charity activity

== Exhibitions ==
In 2009, Simonova opened her first personal exhibition Sand Personality, which included over 300 pictures in sand art and graphics. The exhibition was presented in cities in Crimea from 2009 to 2010. In 2014, she presented her second personal exhibition Another Story, which included 165 pictures in different genres–sand animation, graphics, and painting.

In 2017 and 2018 her third exhibition, Sand Geography, opened in Simferopol and Evpatoriya. It is devoted to different places of the world she visited and managed to capture on paper. The exhibition included over 100 artworks of Simonova in sand drawing, graphics and painting.

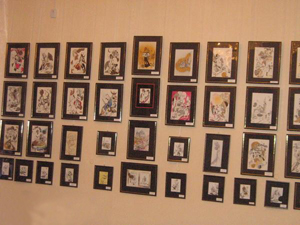
Exhibition: A Sand Personality

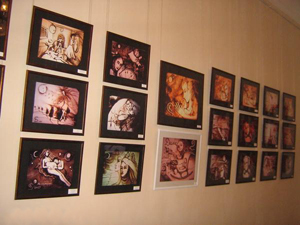
Exhibition: A Sand Personality

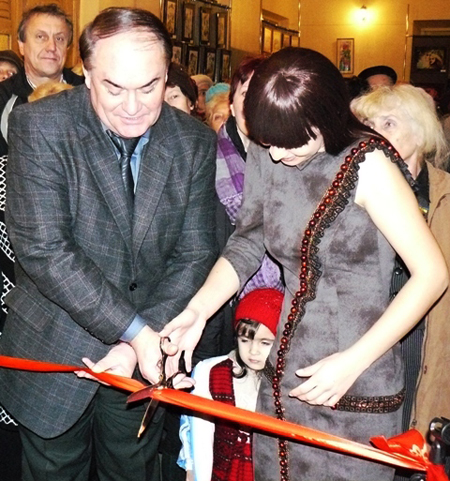
Opening of the exhibition: Kseniya and the Mayor of Yevpatoria

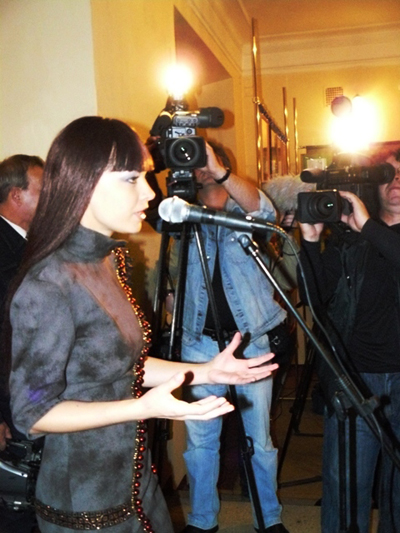
Exhibition: A Sand Personality

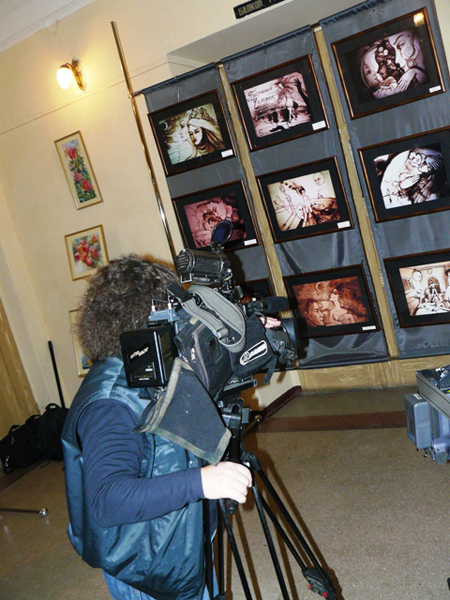
Exhibition: A Sand Personality

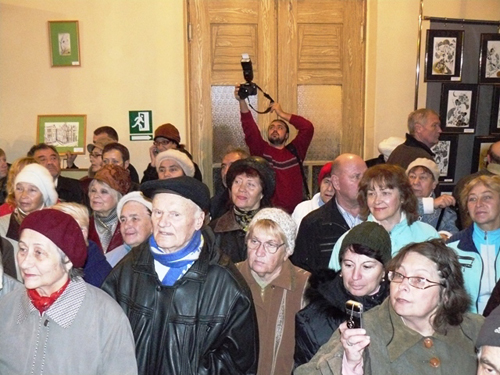
Exhibition: A Sand Personality

== Philanthropy ==
In June 2008, Simonova and Paskar founded a local open charity organization, Live, my Sun! (Живи, Солнышко!). The organization provides assistance to ill children in need of treatment, material and information support of cancer patients.

== Collaboration with brands ==
In 2010 Simonova shot a sand animation advertisement film for The Sunday Times. In 2012, with support from Puma, she created a series of sand animation short films, Dreamcatcher, which focuses on the lives and early dreams of prominent football players Cesc Fàbregas, Tomas Rosicky, Giorgio Chiellini, and Gianluigi Buffon. She met the athletes in their hometowns and interviewed them. During the interviews, she sketched their faces and expressions portraying their childhood dreams in her sketchbook. Simonova and Puma presented the films during UEFA Euro 2012 in Ukraine on broadcast TV channels and the Internet.

== Current projects ==
Since 2013, she has worked on the show White Era and she said she is using all of her skills in all animation techniques on the program. In 2017, Simonova began working on The Forgotten Kingdom — Sand Stories with the Guy Mendilow Ensemble, with multiple funding awards from the National Endowment for the Arts and The Boston Foundation.

Awards and achievements
Preceded by First winner	Winner of Ukrayina maye talant 2009	Succeeded by Olena Kovtun
