= MasterChef Ukraine season 8 =

MasterChef Ukraine
- Season 8

Release
- Original network: STB
- Original release: August 28, 2018

Season chronology
- ← Previous; Season 7 Next → Season 9

The eighth season of the Ukrainian competitive reality television series MasterChef Ukraine premiered on August 28, 2018 on STB.

== Contestants ==
=== Top 20 ===
Contestant	Age	Hometown	Occupation	Status	Winnings	Pressure test
Ivan Milanovich	25	(Indonesia) Bali	Digital marketer	Winner December 26	26	4
Angela Lipska	51	Podilsk	Traveler	Runner-up December 26	16	6
Serzhik Faynyi	20	Kaniv	Student	Third Place December 19	20	5
Vladyslav "Vlad" Mitskevitch	23	Kyiv	Sales Manager	Fourth/Fifth Place December 18	19	6
Elina Pavlenko	19	Mykolaiv	Model	Fourth/Fifth Place December 18	20	4
Yuliya Burtseva	40	Mykolaiv	Housewife	Eliminated December 12	17	4
Lev Markevich	31	Kyiv	Businessman	Eliminated December 5	11	6
Daryna "Darynka" Tsokalo	20	Poltava	Nanny	Eliminated November 28	15	7
Oleksiy Bzhitskiy	32	Kharkiv	Repairer	Eliminated November 21	15	3
Maksym Pustovit	20	Oleshky	Confectioner	Eliminated November 14	14	2
Lybov Blyashka	36	Uzhhorod	Housewife	Eliminated November 7	8	3
Evhen Kirsanov	31	Kyiv	Psychologist	Eliminated October 31	11	2
Anastasiya Vovk	21	Kyiv	Confectioner	Eliminated October 24	6	2
Vladyslav Kyryakulov	35	Kyiv	Masseur	Eliminated October 24	6	4
Daryna Ruban	20	Zmitniv	Director	Eliminated October 10	4	2
Denys Voytenko	29	Skolobov	Journalist	Eliminated October 10	9	1
Vira Volga	70	Kharkiv	School cook	Eliminated October 3	4	2
Ihor Kopus	27	Koziatyn	Hairdresser	Eliminated September 26	3	1
Dmytro Kravchuk	21	Lutsk	Waiter	Eliminated September 19	2	2
Mykhailo Halaychuk	33	Ivano-Frankivsk	Naturist	Eliminated September 12	0	1

=== Elimination table ===
Place	Contestant	Week 10				Week 11				Week 12					Week 13					Week 14				Week 15			Week 16
Place	Contestant	23 EP		24 EP		25 EP		26 EP		27 EP		28 EP			29 EP		30 EP			31 EP		32 EP		33 EP		34 EP	35 EP
1	Ivan	WIN	IN	WIN		IN	IN	WIN		WIN	WIN	WIN	WIN		IN	WIN	IN	IN		WIN	WIN	IN		IN	IN	WIN	WINNER
2	Angela	WIN	IN	WIN		IN	IN	PT	TOP	IN	WIN	IN	WIN		PT	WIN	IN	IN	IN	PT	IN	IN	IN	IN	IN	IN	RUNNER-UP
3	Serzhik	WIN	IN	WIN		IN	PT	IN	LOW	IN	WIN	IN	WIN		WIN	IN	PT	WIN		IN	IN	PT	WIN	IN	IN	ELIM	
4	Vlad	WIN	IN	IN		PT	IMM	WIN		WIN	PT	IN	IN	IN	WIN	WIN	IN	PT	WIN	WIN	WIN	IN		IN	ELIM		
5	Elina	WIN	WIN	IN		PT	IN	WIN	TOP	WIN	WIN	PT	IN	IN	WIN	IN	WIN	IN		WIN	WIN	IN		ELIM			
6	Yuliya	WIN	PT	IN	IN	IN	IN	WIN		PT	IN	IN	IMM		WIN	WIN	PT	WIN		IN	PT	IN	ELIM				
7	Lev	WIN	IN	PT	IN	PT	IN	IN	TOP	IN	IN	IN	PT	LOW	IN	PT	IN	IN	ELIM								
8	Darynka	WIN	IN	IN		PT	IN	IN	IN		IN	PT	ELIM														
9	Oleksiy	WIN	PT	IN	LOW	IN	PT	WIN	ELIM																		
10	Maksym	WIN	IN	PT	ELIM																						

Place	Contestant	Week 1				Week 2				Week 3				Week 4				Week 5				Week 6				Week 7			Week 8				Week 9			
Place	Contestant	5 EP		6 EP		7 EP		8 EP		9 EP		10 EP		11 EP		12 EP		13 EP		14 EP		15 EP		16 EP		17 EP		18 EP	19 EP		20 EP		21 EP		22 EP	
TOP 10	Angela	IN	WIN	IN		WIN	IN	IN		WIN	WIN	WIN		WIN	IN	WIN		PT	IN	WIN	IN	IN	IN	IN		IN	IN		PT	IN	WIN	IN	WIN	PT	IN	WIN
TOP 10	Darynka	PT	IN	WIN	TOP	IN	WIN	WIN		WIN	WIN	IN		PT	IN	WIN	WIN	WIN	WIN	WIN		WIN	IN	PT	IN	IN	IN		WIN	PT	IN	IN	WIN	WIN	PT	TOP
TOP 10	Elina	IN	IN	WIN		IN	WIN	WIN		IN	IN	IN		WIN	WIN	WIN		IN	IN	WIN		PT	WIN	WIN	IN	TOP	WIN		PT	IN	WIN	LOW	IN	IN	IN	
TOP 10	Ivan	IN	PT	WIN	IN	PT	IN	WIN	IN	WIN	WIN	WIN		WIN	IN	WIN		WIN	WIN	IN		WIN	WIN	IN		IN	PT	IN	WIN	WIN	PT	LOW	IN	WIN	WIN	
TOP 10	Lev	IN	WIN	IN		IN	IN	IN		IN	IN	IN		IN	IN	WIN		PT	WIN	WIN	IN	WIN	IN	WIN		IN	WIN		WIN	IN	PT	WIN	IN	WIN	IN	
TOP 10	Maksym	IN	IN	WIN		IN	IN	IN		WIN	WIN	WIN		WIN	WIN	IN		IN	IN	IN		IN	WIN	WIN		WIN	WIN		WIN	IN	WIN		IN	PT	WIN	LOW
TOP 10	Oleksiy	IN	IN	WIN		WIN	WIN	IN		IN	IN	IN		WIN	WIN	WIN		WIN	WIN	IN		IN	WIN	WIN		IN	WIN		PT	IN	IN	IN	WIN	IN	WIN	
TOP 10	Serzhik	IN	IN	PT	IN	WIN	WIN	WIN		IN	WIN	WIN		IN	IN	IN		PT	IN	IN	IN	WIN	WIN	IN		PT	WIN	WIN	WIN	IN	WIN		IN	WIN	WIN	
TOP 10	Vlad	PT	IN	WIN	TOP	WIN	WIN	WIN		IN	PT	IN	IN	WIN	IN	IN		PT	WIN	WIN	IN	IN	IN	IN		IN	IN		PT	IN	WIN	IN	WIN	IN	WIN	
TOP 10	Yuliya	IN	WIN	IN		WIN	IN	IN		WIN	WIN	IN		IN	WIN	PT	TOP	PT	IN	IN	IN	IN	IN	WIN		TOP	WIN		WIN	IN	WIN		WIN	WIN	WIN	
11	Lybov	IN	IN	IN		WIN	IN	IN		IN	WIN	IN		WIN	WIN	IN		PT	IN	IN	IN	IN	WIN	WIN		IN	IN		PT	WIN	IN	IN	PT	WIN	IN	ELIM
12	Evhen	IN	IN	IN		IN	WIN	WIN		IN	WIN	WIN		IN	IN	IN		WIN	WIN	WIN		WIN	PT	WIN	IN	IN	WIN		PT	WIN	IN	ELIM				
13	Anastasiya	IN	IN	WIN		WIN	WIN	WIN		IN	IN	IN		IN	IN	IN		IN	WIN	PT	IN	WIN	IN	IN		IN	PT	ELIM								
13	Vladyslav	IN	PT	IN	TOP	IN	WIN	WIN		IN	IN	IN		IN	PT	WIN	IN	PT	IN	WIN	IN	WIN	WIN	IN		PT	IN	ELIM								
15	Daryna	IN	WIN	IN		WIN	IN	IN		IN	IN	PT	WIN	IN	IN	WIN		IN	PT	IN	ELIM															
15	Denys	IN	WIN	WIN		WIN	IN	IN		WIN	WIN	IN		IN	WIN	WIN		PT	WIN	WIN	ELIM															
17	Vira	IN	IN	WIN		IN	WIN	PT	IN	IN	IN	WIN		WIN	IN	PT	ELIM																			
18	Ihor	IN	WIN	WIN		IN	IN	WIN		PT	IN	IN	ELIM																							
19	Dmytro	PT	WIN	IN	IN	WIN	PT	IN	ELIM																											
20	Mykhailo	PT	IN	IN	ELIM																															

Key

Winner	Runner-up	Individual challenge winner
Team challenge winner	Challenge loser (PT)	Individual challenge top entry
Challenge winner for immunity	Saved last	Eliminated
Withdrew	Returned	Did not compete

== Episodes ==
=== Episode 1-2 ===
Original airdate: August 28, 2018

Casting for the top 50.

=== Episode 3-4 ===
Original airdate: September 4, 2018

50 semi-finalists were narrowed down to the top 20.

=== Episode 5-6 ===
Original airdate: September 11, 2018

- Team challenge 1: Relay. Each member of the team takes turns preparing their portion of the dish. Bottom: Daryna, Dmytro, Vlad, Mykhailo.
- Team challenge 2: Conveyor. The captain and assistant make a dish from the dough, remaining team must guess and cook it right. Bottom: Ivan, Vladyslav.
- Team challenge 3: Street Food. The team should cook and sell their dishes to tourists on the Andriyivskyy Descent. Bottom: Serzhik.
- Black apron challenge: Each participant must prepare 4 dishes from the ingredients which his opponent will give him. Eliminated: Mykhailo

=== Episode 7-8 ===
Original airdate: September 18, 2018

- Eliminated: Dmytro
