= Ukrayina maye talant =

Ukrainian television series

- Ukrainian: Україна має талант
- Created by: Simon Cowell
- Presented by: Oksana Marchenko
- Judges: Hector Jimenez-Bravo; Slava Frolova; Ihor Kondratiuk; Viacheslav Uzelkov
- Country of origin: Ukraine
- Original languages: Ukrainian; Russian
- No. of seasons: 10

Production
- Producers: Tana Onishchuk (2009–12); Stanislav Bevzenko (2010)
- Running time: 200 minutes

Original release
- Network: STB
- Release: April 3, 2009 – present

Ukrayina maye talant (Ukrainian: Україна має талант, lit. 'Ukraine's Got Talent') is a Ukrainian reality television series on the STB television network, and part of the global British Got Talent series. It is a talent show that features singers, dancers, sketch artists, comedians, and other performers of all ages competing for the advertised top prize of ₴1,000,000. The show debuted in April 2009. The three judges Vladyslav Yama, Slava Frolova and Ihor Kondratiuk joined host Oksana Marchenko. Contestants Kseniya Simonova and Anastasia Sokolova were revealed by this show. The show is now in its 6th season with two new judges: Hector Jimenez-Bravo and Viacheslav Uzelkov.

== Rules of the show ==
Participants may enter of any age and residence. Organizers of the show browse thousands of rooms to choose the best numbers that will fight for the title of the most talented person in Ukraine and 1 million prize in USD. Voting is determined by SMS. Viewers can send messages over the news release (in the semifinals), or in the finals during the week, and vote for the names of 10 finalists. Check count of votes are obtained and confirmed by the international auditing company Ernst & Young.

== Seasons overview ==
=== Season 1 (2009) ===
The 1st season of Ukraine's Got Talent began in April 2009 and ended shortly afterwards. The judges were Vladyslav Yama, Slava Frolova and Ihor Kondratyuk, and it was broadcast on STB. The 1st season was won by artist Kseniya Simonova, for sand animation. Dmytro Khaladzhi, a world-record gymnast, refused to participate in the final duet in favor of Art Van, 1 of 10 finalists of the season.

=== Season 2 (2010) ===
The 2nd season began in 2010, and concluded with Olena Kovtun as the winner.

=== Season 3 (2011) ===
The 3rd season began in 2011, and concluded with Vitaliy Luzkar as the winner.

=== Season 4 (2012) ===
The 4th season began in 2012, and concluded with a singer known as Aida Nikolaichuk. The composer Evgeny Khmara was a finalist in the competition.

=== Season 5 (2013) ===
The 5th season began in 2013, and concluded with a folk group "Lisapetnyi Batalyon" as the winner. 2nd runner up was Anastasia Sokolova, an athlete who perfected pole dancing routines.

=== Season 6 (2014) ===
The 6th season began March 7, 2014 with new judges: Hector Jimenez-Bravo and Viacheslav Uzelkov. The winners were acrobatic members of the Dudnik family.

=== Season 7 (2015) ===
The winner was singer Sayid Dzhurdi Abd Allakh of Syria.

=== Season 8 (2016) ===
The winner was 2-year-old regional geographer Arina Shuhalevych.

=== Season 9 (2017) ===
The winner was 5-year-old singer Veronika Morsʹka.

=== Season 10 (2021) ===
The winner was singer Artem Fesko.

== Ratings ==
The 1st season of Ukraine's Got Talent garnered as many as 11 million viewers, most of whom were in the age group 13–49.
