= Hector Jimenez-Bravo =

Colombian-Ukrainian chef (born 1972)

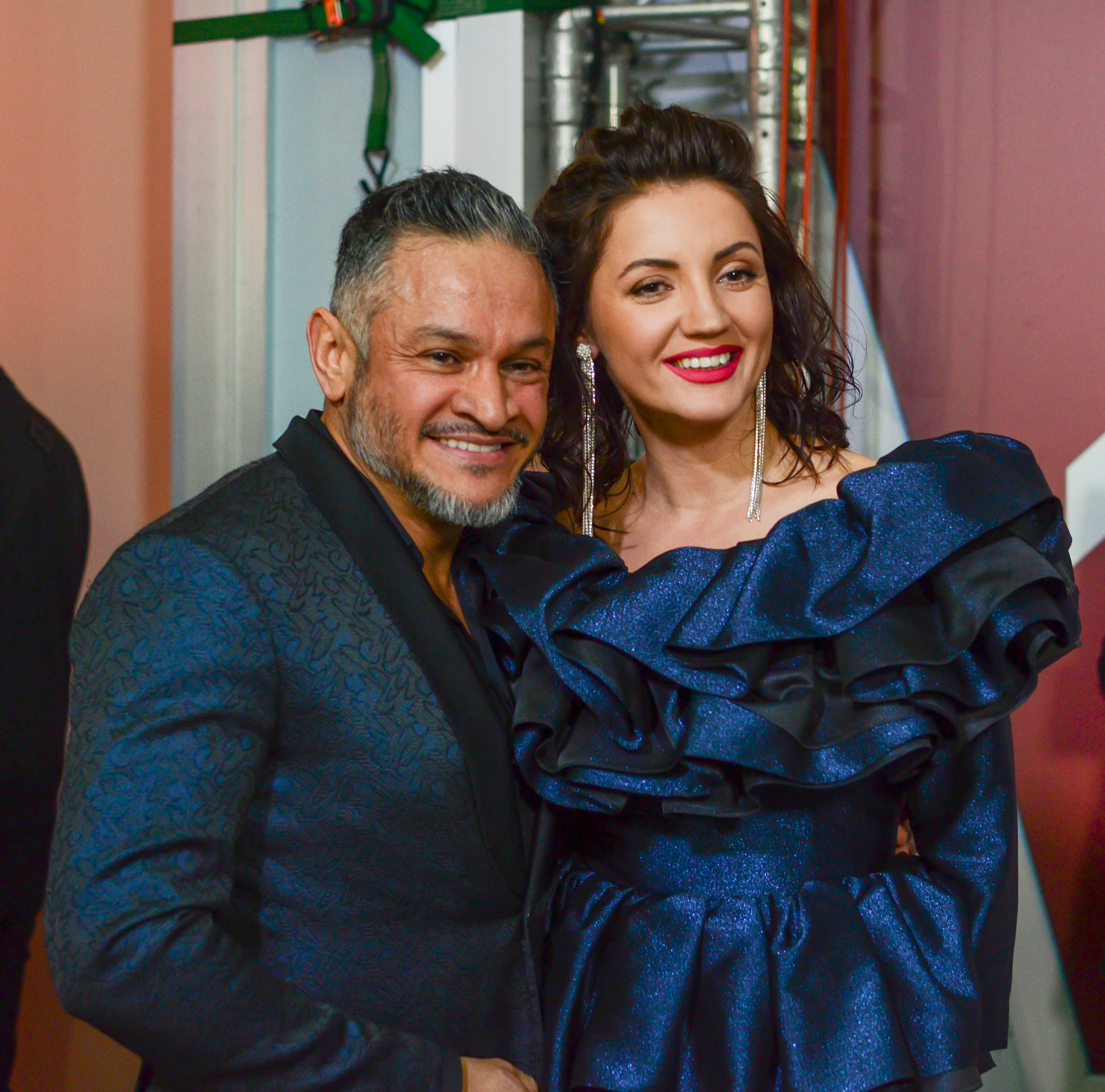
- Hector Jimenez-Bravo and Olha Tsybulska
- Born: Héctor Ismael Jiménez Bravo; 14 January 1972 (age 54); Bucaramanga, Santander, Colombia
- Citizenship: Colombian citizenship, Canadian citizenship, Ukrainian citizenship
- Education: National Service of Learning (Colombia)
- Culinary career
- Cooking style: French / Latin America / Asian / American / Canadian
- Television shows: MasterChef Ukraine; "Ukraine's Got Talent"; Everything Will Be Ok; Culinary Dynasty
- Website: www.chefbravo.com

Hector Ismael Jimenez-Bravo (Spanish: Héctor Ismael Jiménez-Bravo; born 14 January 1972) is a Colombian-born Canadian and Ukrainian chef, businessman, television presenter and culinary arts lecturer. He is currently based in Ukraine, holding Ukrainian citizenship and serving as a judge on shows such as MasterChef Ukraine, Ukraine's Got Talent. He is the founder of Bravo Restaurant Group Company and is a recipient of "The World Master Chef" award.

== Biography ==
Hector Jimenez-Bravo was born and raised in Colombia. In the words of the chef himself, his mother has encouraged him to cook. He was interested not only in the procedure of cooking but also in its aesthetic side. In high school, he was into fine arts, which woke-up his creative side. Later on, he did enrolled into the Culinary Arts Program from the National Learning Service in Bogotá, from where he has graduated. After in 1992, he began to work in the best 5 star hotels of Colombia, such as the "Hotel Charleston Casa Medina", "Metrotel Royal Park" from Royal Hotels.

In 1995–1999, he lectured Culinary Arts at National Learning Service of Medellín.

At the age of 27, he was offered to become a Chef of Restaurants at one of the most luxurious hotels in the USA – Hilton Boston Back Bay in Boston. He then became the youngest chef at this Hilton. At first days of his work, colleagues did not perceived Hector seriously, because of his youthful age, but soon they encountered his professionalism. According to Hector Jimenez-Bravo, the work in the U.S. had a powerful influence on him, and divided his career into two parts – before and after Hilton.

After one of private dinners at the Hilton organized for a group of hoteliers from Canada, he was invited to work in Ottawa. Hector was offered a contract to open at The Marshes Golf Club. After a little more than 2 years he made a move to open the restaurant "Foundation" in the Canadian capital.

The restaurants led by Hector, more than once made the top 10 best restaurants in Canada. After 6 years in Canada, Jimenez-Bravo took the citizenship of this country.

In 2006, Jimenez-Bravo became a chef at Radisson SAS Royal Hotel, St. Petersburg. His work brought to the hotel Radisson the «Best Hotel Restaurant Award» from magazine "TimeOut". After his arrival to St. Petersburg, he surprised the city with the opening of a «Nuevo Latino» concept, which was very unknown and new to the city. In 2006 the G8 Summit took place in St. Petersburg, where Jimenez-Bravo had a difficult task serving heads of the world's leading countries.

After Russia, in 2007, Jimenez-Bravo moved back to Canada, where he took a lead on the kitchen at the Delta Hotels & Resorts in Fredericton.

In 2008, Hector left for the Maldives to lead the kitchens of the most famous Hotels in Asia. There he was the Director of Cuisine at "W Retreat & SPA" and the "Sheraton Maldives Full Moon Resort & SPA" hotels. Traveling to Singapore and Hong Kong, Hector studied the culture of Chinese and Malay cuisines, and was part of the "Task Force" for the openings of the "W Hong Kong" and the "St. Regis Singapore" hotels.

In 2009, Hector Jimenez-Bravo received an offer from the international hotel chain InterContinental Hotels Group to open restaurants at the five-star hotel InterContinental Kyiv in Ukraine, where he created and implemented the concepts of all the restaurants. Aside from the hotel, Hector developed concepts for several restaurants of the owning company.

At the end of 2010, he developed restaurant concepts and kitchen technology for the Fairmont Grand Hotel Kyiv, as well as other prestigious hotels in Kyiv.

From September 2011, Hector has been involved into several culinary projects on Ukrainian television, primarily STV channel.

In 2016, Hector has opened his First restaurant of modern Chinese cuisine in Ukraine BAO. In 2018 Hector has opened NAM. Modern Vietnamese Restaurant and pastry shop Bo.Pastry.

In 2017, Hector published "The first culinary book" (in Ukrainian) which became a bestseller with 400,000 book sold. In 2018 he publishes second culinary book "New Year Culinary Book"

In May 2021, he received Ukrainian citizenship.

Since the beginning of the Russian invasion of Ukraine on February 24, 2022, Hector Jimenez-Bravo expressed his support for Ukraine: "My heart aches for Ukraine. My place is here. Ukrainians - are my family." He returned from Colombia, where he was on vacation in Warsaw, and began working with local voluntary organizations. Hector is involved in two directions - refugee coordination and organizing charity events to collect funds for Ukraine. Also, Hector's restaurants and partner establishments in Kyiv prepare 2000-2500 meals daily. Food is given to territorial defenses, Armed Forces, police, hospitals, as well as old people who need help.

== Culinary style ==
Hector Bravo's culinary style is based on the ideas of multiculturalism and integration of wide variety of cooking methods. Hector Bravo is a founder of his own culinary style «Nuevo Latino». It combines Latin American culinary traditions, French refinement and the delicacy of the Asian cuisine.

"My food speaks with its own language, the Latin American that I love, the French culture which I have learned, the Asian techniques that always inspire me and the Canadian spirit because it is inside of my heart."

Hector Jimenez-Bravo describing his culinary style.

== TV projects ==
- 2011 Judge of MasterChef Ukraine, STB channel
- 2011 TV Host of post-show MasterChef, STB channel
- 2012 TV Host for "The Culinary Dynasty" show, STB channel
- 2012 Culinary Expert "Everything Will be OK" show, STB channel
- 2012 Judge of MasterChef Ukraine 2nd season, STB channel
- 2013 TV Host for "Culinary Dynasty" show 2nd season, STB channel
- 2013 Judge of the MasterChef Ukraine 3rd Season, STB channel
- 2014 Judge of the Ukraine's Got Talent 6th Season, STB channel
- 2014 Judge of the MasterChef Ukraine 4th Season, STB channel
- 2015 Judge of the MasterChef Ukraine 5th Season, STB channel
- 2016 Judge of the MasterChef Kids Ukraine 1st Season, STB channel
- 2016 Judge of the MasterChef Ukraine 6th Season, STB channel
- 2017 Judge of the MasterChef Ukraine 7th Season, STB channel
- 2018 Judge of the MasterChef Ukraine 8th Season, STB channel
- 2019 Judge of the MasterChef Professionals Ukraine 1st Season, STB channel
- 2019 Judge of the MasterChef Ukraine 9th Season, STB channel
- 2020 Judge of the MasterChef Ukraine Professionals 2nd Season, STB channel
- 2020 Judge of the MasterChef Ukraine 10th Season, STB channel

Appeared as the Star Guest:

- 2011 "The Cube show", STB channel
- 2012 "Big Difference", 1+1 channel
- 2013 "Darling, we are killing the kids" show, STB channel.
- 2013 "You Think you can dance" show, STB channel.
- 2014 "One for All" show, STB channel.
- 2014 "Hata na tata" show, STB channel.

== Interesting facts ==
- His first job after graduation from High school, he was washing dishes in a Hotel.
- Has served the late Queen of the United Kingdom Elizabeth II, U.S. President George W. Bush, British Prime Minister Tony Blair, Russian President Vladimir Putin, pop singer Madonna and Jennifer Lopez.
- His favorite dish – "Scallops from Normandy with leek, black truffle and broth Parmentier", which he developed with his friend Alain Ducasse.
- Hector's favorite cocktail is "Chili & passion" served at the Principe di Savoya hotel in Milan. It combines vodka, passion fruit, chilli and citrus juice.
- During his travels he always takes a set of 58 professional Swiss knives. He always carries an internal temperature thermometer to measure the temperature of the dishes he prepares.
- Bravo has been working since he was 16, but he has never been on holiday for more than two weeks.
- Bravo is very interested in diving. He became an open-water diver. He has confessed, that most of the major decisions in his life, he took while diving.

== Business ==
Hector Jimenez-Bravo is a head of the international consulting company "Bravo Restaurant Group". Dozens of restaurants in Kyiv, Montreal, Ottawa, Hong Kong and other cities have been opened under the leadership of the company.

In 2011, Jimenez-Bravo launched the production of spices, manufactured by his own formulations and recipes. His spices went on sale under the brand "Pripravka" brand which was found by SPS group in year 2000.

In November 2013, opened Hector Jimenez-Bravo Culinary Academy in Kyiv. Its mission is to introduce world culinary cuisine to culinary fans and to improve proficiency of professional cooks.

In May 2016, opened Hector Jimenez-Bravo Online Culinary Academy.

In February 2016, opened Modern Chinese cuisine restaurant BAO in Kyiv.

== Quotes ==
"The creative culinary manner of Hector Bravo can be characterized by the meanings of "passion and energy", but, aside from that, words such as "tenderness" and "finesse" would be appropriate as well.

Natalia Siverina, restaurant critic, "Kommersant"
