= Yevhen Klopotenko =

Ukrainian chef and restaurateur (born 1986)

- Євген Клопотенко
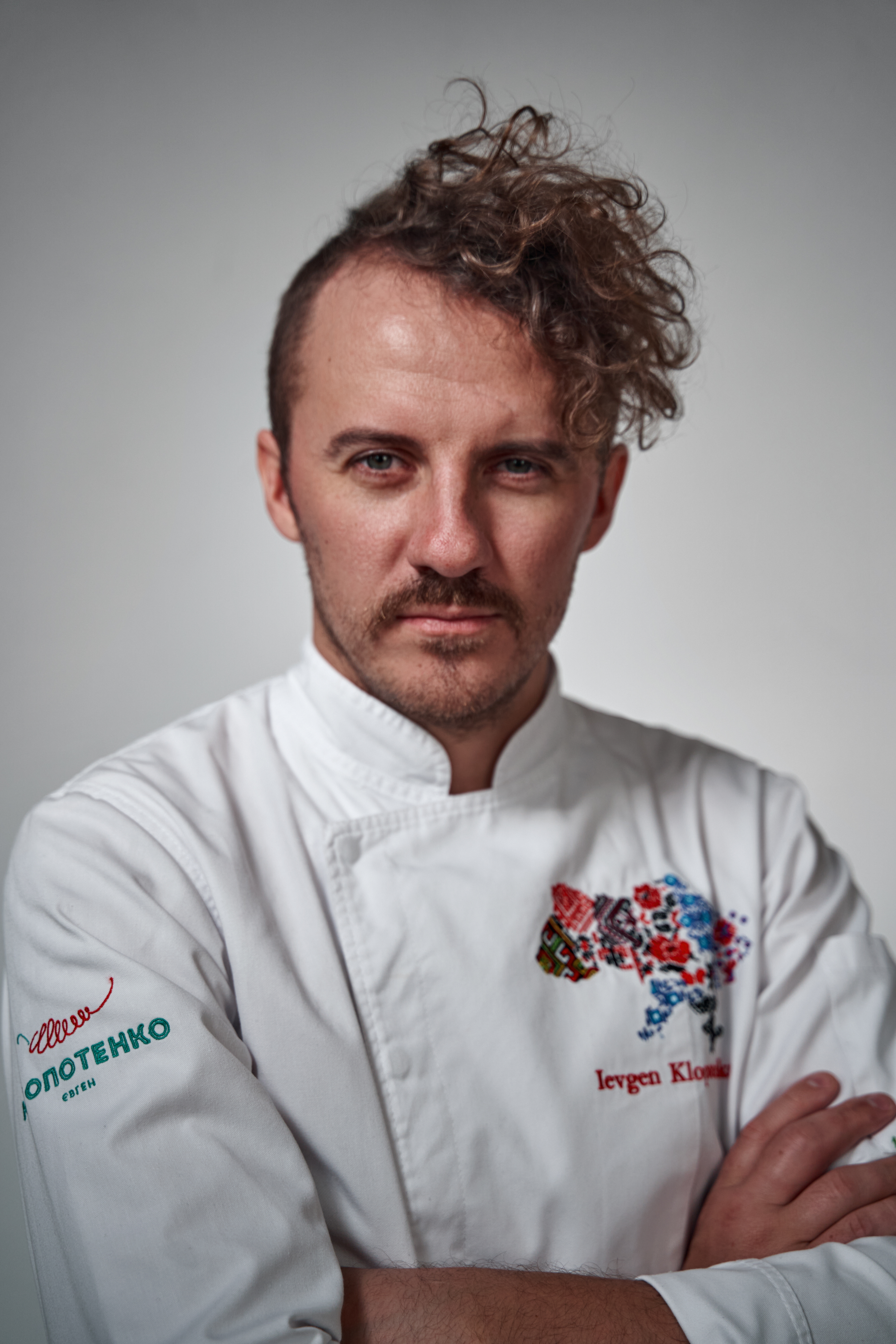
- Klopotenko in 2021
- Born: 23 November 1986 (age 39); Kyiv, Ukrainian SSR, Soviet Union
- Education: Le Cordon Bleu
- Culinary career
- Cooking style: Ukrainian cuisine
- Current restaurants
- 100 Rokiv Tomu Vpered; Inshi
- Website: klopotenko.com

Yevhen Victorovich Klopotenko (Note: Also transliterated as Ievgen) (Ukrainian: Євген Вікторович Клопотенко; born 23 November 1986) is a Ukrainian celebrity chef and restaurateur. His work focuses on traditional Ukrainian cuisine. Since 2019, he has run the restaurant 100 Rokiv Tomu Vpered in Kyiv, which features pre-Soviet Ukrainian dishes.

Klopotenko won MasterChef Ukraine in 2015 and then studied at Le Cordon Bleu. In 2017, he led the Cult Food project to improve school meals in Ukraine. He has documented Ukrainian regional styles of borscht; his work led to the dish being listed as UNESCO Intangible Cultural Heritage for Ukraine in 2022. He has supported the Ukrainian effort in the Russian invasion of Ukraine and his restaurants have given free meals to refugees.

Klopotenko has written two cookbooks in English. He starred in a 2023 documentary about borscht, titled Borsch: The Secret Ingredient.

== Early life ==
Klopotenko was born in Kyiv in 1986. In 1991, he spent time living with his grandmother in England, near Manchester, where he was introduced to more diverse food. His parents taught him to cook borscht and scrambled eggs, which he credits for his early interest in recipe development.

Klopotenko learned about global cuisine on the internet, and he was inspired to become a chef after watching Gordon Ramsay in Kitchen Nightmares. In his twenties, Klopotenko traveled to Italy and gained an interest in Italian cuisine. He worked at a Mexican restaurant in the United States, at a McDonald's franchise in Germany while on a university program, and at various restaurants in Kyiv. Before becoming a professional chef, he sold homemade jam.

== Career ==
Klopotenko experienced breakout success when he won MasterChef Ukraine in 2015. He then studied at Le Cordon Bleu in Paris. He created a TV series titled Odyssey that featured Ukraine's culinary traditions through historical figures. It ran for three seasons.

Klopotenko was inspired to revive traditional Ukrainian food after realizing that, besides borscht, salo, and varenyky, people were unfamiliar with Ukrainian dishes and mostly ate food introduced during the Soviet era.

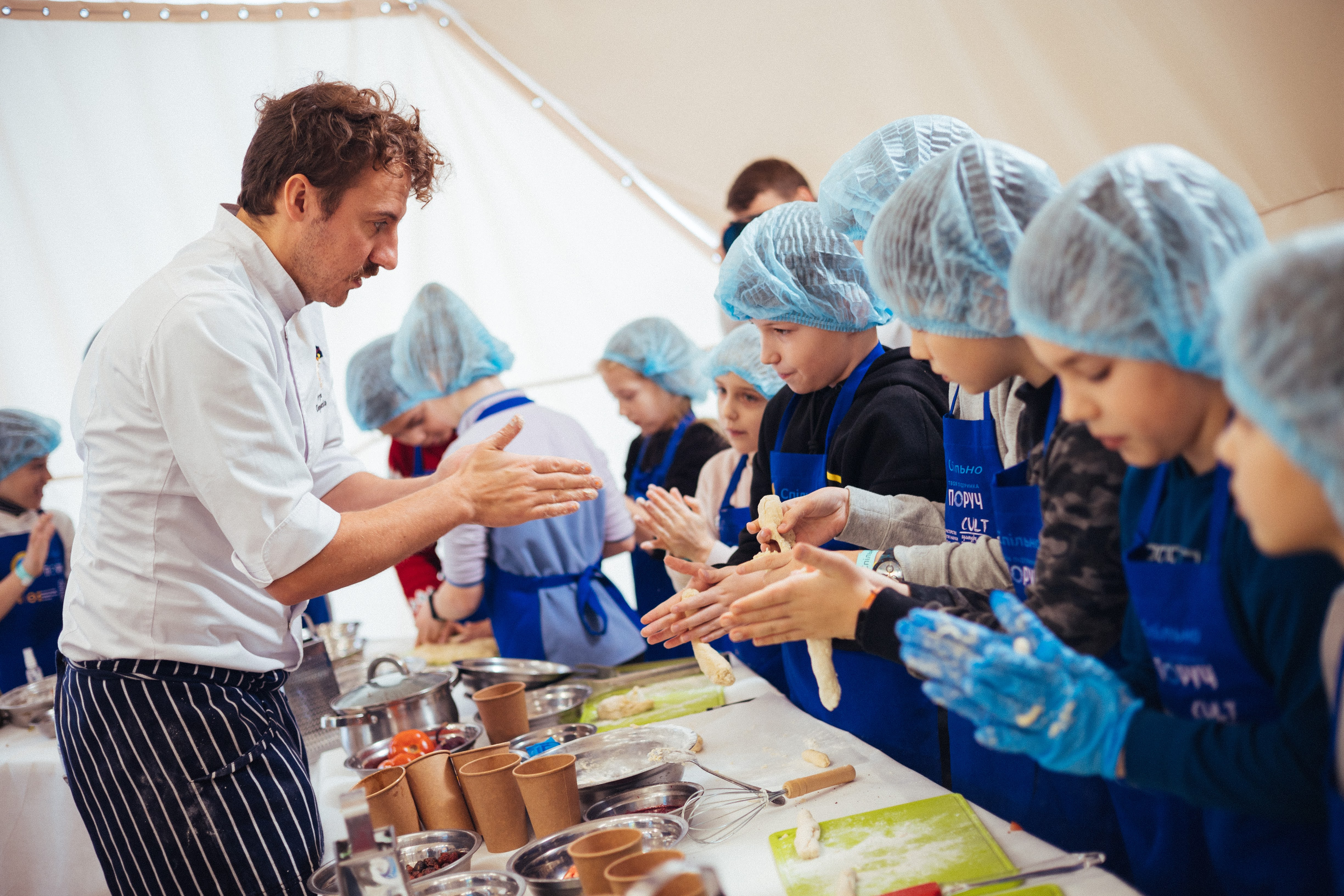
Klopotenko at a UNICEF healthy eating workshop in 2023

In 2017, Klopotenko began an effort to improve school meals, called the Cult Food project. Ukraine's school meals had been subject to Soviet-era regulations since 1956, which forbade spices besides black pepper. He took four years to develop a menu that was healthy and featured both Ukrainian and international dishes. It became the national standard on 1 January 2022. He has collaborated with First Lady Olena Zelenska on childhood nutrition campaigns.

=== Borscht ===
Borscht is Klopotenko's signature dish. In 2020, he created a YouTube series called The Secret Ingredient featuring people across the country making borscht. He considers borscht a unifier for Ukrainians.

Klopotenko is a proponent of recognizing borscht as a Ukrainian, rather than Russian, dish. He has described it as his "cultural frontline" and said in a 2020 interview with AFP, "I don't really like to call it a war for borscht, but in fact that's what it is." In 2018, he began a campaign for UNESCO to list borscht as intangible cultural heritage. The effort was partly in response to tweets by the Russian government saying borscht is "one of Russia's most famous and beloved dishes." Along with Maryna Sobotiuk of the Ukrainian Ministry of Information Policy, he assembled a team of culinary historians and ethnographers who document recipes from 26 regions of Ukraine. In October 2020, they submitted to Ukraine's cultural ministry their findings, including five liters of borscht, and the ministry approved the listing of borscht as Ukrainian "intangible cultural inheritance." On 1 July 2022, UNESCO fast-tracked a decision to list it as intangible cultural heritage in need of safeguarding. A representative of Russia's foreign ministry, Maria Zakharova, responded that Ukraine was xenophobically refusing to share the dish. Ukraine's Minister of Culture Oleksandr Tkachenko posted on Telegram, "Victory in the war for borsch is ours!" UNESCO stated that its decision "does not imply exclusivity" but that Ukraine's application was prioritized due to the Russian invasion of Ukraine threatening the country's tradition.

Klopotenko's documentary, Borsch: The Secret Ingredient, features his travels from 2018 to 2019, where he spoke to people across Ukraine about their recipes. It was produced by Natalka Yakymovych, who received $149,000 from the U.S. Agency for International Development and additional funding from the Kyiv-based studio Film.UA. Its footage first aired in 2019 on 1+1 as a series of short episodes and as a documentary on the Independence Day of Ukraine of that year. Film.UA planned for a theatrical release in Ukraine, which was cancelled due to the COVID-19 pandemic. Netflix acquired the rights and pivoted the film's focus to Ukraine's cultural identity during the Russian invasion. It was released as an 80-minute film on Netflix on 30 March 2023.

=== Restaurants ===
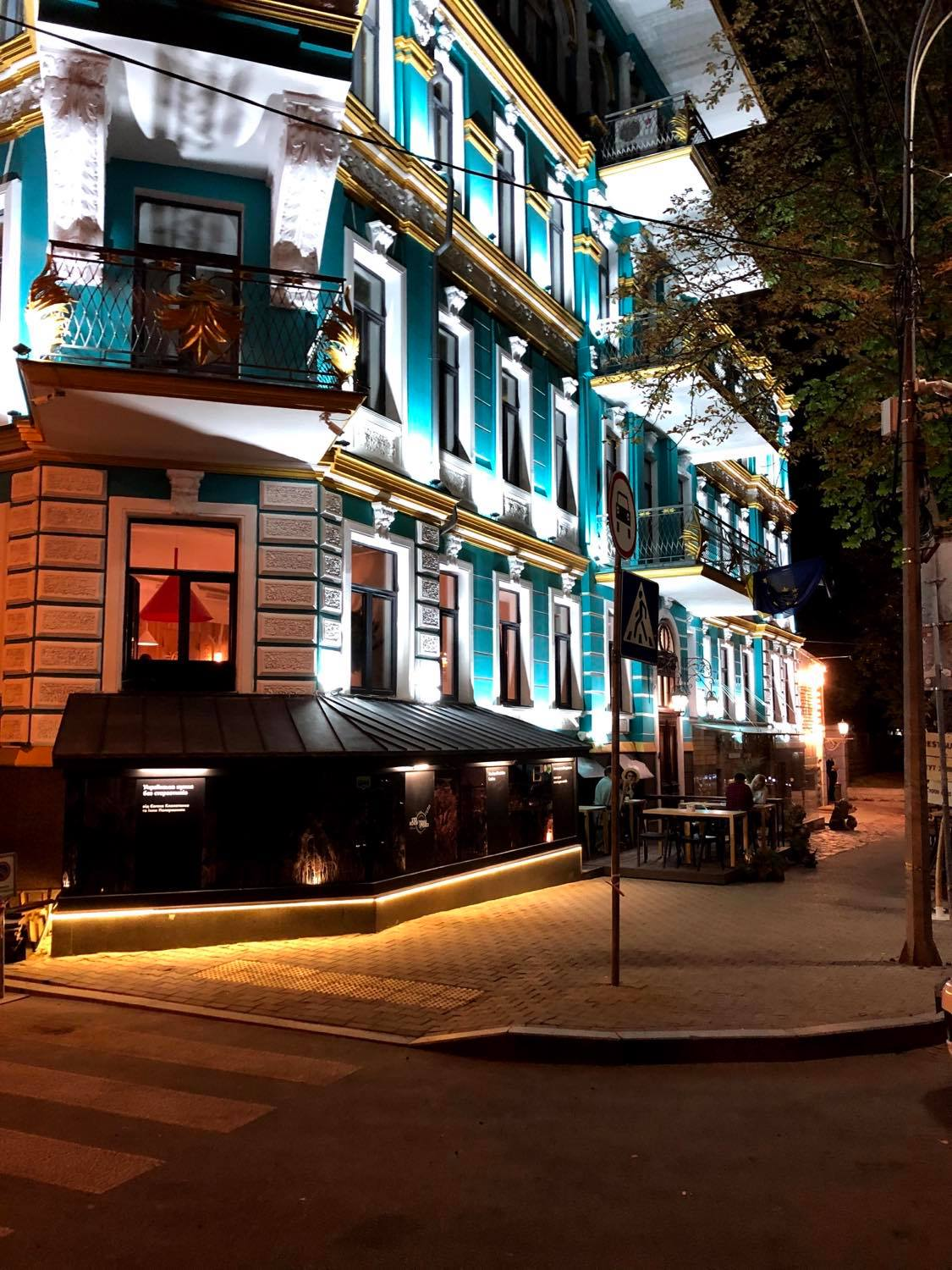
The exterior of 100 Rokiv Tomu Vpered

In March 2019, Klopotenko opened 100 Rokiv Tomu Vpered (transl. Fast Forward 100 Years), a restaurant in Kyiv's city center focusing on reviving pre-Soviet Ukrainian cuisine. It was cofounded by Inna Popereshnyuk, a cofounder of Nova Poshta. To study historical dishes, he referred to mentions of food in Ukrainian literature, such as Ivan Kotliarevsky's Eneïda; Ukraine's first cookbook, Practical Kitchen by Olha Franko; and the 1913 book Food and Drink of Ukraine, written by multiple people under the pseudonym Zinaida Klynovetska. He then traveled to learn about Ukraine's regional cuisines. The restaurant's ingredients are locally sourced.

When the Russian invasion of Ukraine began in February 2022, 100 Rokiv closed for two days, then operated as a military canteen. By April, it produced 1,000 meals for the army per day. The restaurant reopened in July.

In March 2022, Klopotenko opened a pop-up bistro in Lviv called Inshi (transl. "Others"), which offers free meals for refugees of the war. When Klopotenko noticed the volume of refugees passing through Lviv, he acquired a former cafe building and opened the restaurant five days later. The restaurant lists its free options as "menu two" and avoids referring to its customers as refugees. The free menu is funded by paying customers, donations, and Klopotenko's own money.

In April 2022, Klopotenko began catering for diplomats and other VIPs on the national rail service, Ukrzaliznytsia, in an effort to gain their political support. The first he served was Boris Johnson, whose identity was kept secret from him; others included Olaf Scholz and Bono. In November, he hosted a series of dinners in the United Kingdom to raise money for victims of the war.

=== Books ===
In October 2021, Klopotenko released an English-language cookbook with seventy recipes, including varynyky, holubtsi, deruny, and several borscht recipes he found across the country.

Klopotenko's second cookbook in English, The Authentic Ukrainian Kitchen, was released on 15 May 2024 in the United Kingdom and the United States. It is published under the imprint Voracious worldwide and Robinson in the United Kingdom. He called the book a "love letter to the diverse culture and foodways of Ukraine." It received reviews by Booklist and Publishers Weekly and a starred review from Library Journal.

=== Awards ===
In 2021, Klopotenko was included in the 50 Next ranking by The World's 50 Best Restaurants, the first Ukrainian to be listed.

== Public image ==
Klopotenko is a celebrity chef, known for his fashion and unruly curly hair. He has been called "Ukraine's Jamie Oliver".

The Russian invasion of Ukraine has shaped his image as an ambassador defending Ukrainian culture. He was one of the people featured in Time when it listed "Volodymyr Zelenskyy and the Spirit of Ukraine" as the 2022 Person of the Year.
