= MasterChef Ukraine =

- Genre: Cooking show
- Judges: Hector Jimenez-Bravo (1-) Volodymyr Yaroslavskyi (9-); Olga Martynovska (10-)
- Country of origin: Ukraine
- Original languages: Ukrainian, Spanish, Russian
- No. of seasons: 10
- No. of episodes: 143

Production
- Production location: Brovary
- Running time: 3 hour

Original release
- Network: STB
- Release: 31 August 2011 – 27 December 2025

MasterChef Ukraine is a Ukrainian competitive reality television cooking show based on the revival USA version of MasterChef. The first episode aired on 31 August 2011 on STB.

On 13 November 2024, the set of MasterChef Ukraine was damaged by a Russian missile strike in Kyiv.

== Judges ==
=== MasterChef ===
Season	Year	Judges		
Season	Year	1	2	3
Season 1	2011	Hector Jimenez-Bravo	Anfisa Chekhova	Mykola Tischenko
Season 2	2012	Hector Jimenez-Bravo	Zhanna Badoeva	Mykola Tischenko
Season 3	2013	Hector Jimenez-Bravo	Tetyana Lytvynova	Mykola Tischenko
Season 4	2014	Hector Jimenez-Bravo	Tetyana Lytvynova	Mykola Tischenko
Season 5	2015	Hector Jimenez-Bravo	Tetyana Lytvynova	Mykola Tischenko
Season 6	2016	Hector Jimenez-Bravo	Tetyana Lytvynova	Serhiy Kalinin
Season 7	2017	Hector Jimenez-Bravo	Tetyana Lytvynova	Dmytro Horovenko
Season 8	2018	Hector Jimenez-Bravo	Tetyana Lytvynova	Dmytro Horovenko
Season 9	2019	Hector Jimenez-Bravo	Yelyzaveta Hlinska	Volodymyr Yaroslavskyi
Season 10	2020	Hector Jimenez-Bravo	Olha Martynovska	Volodymyr Yaroslavskyi
Season 11	2021	Hector Jimenez-Bravo	Olha Martynovska	Volodymyr Yaroslavskyi
Season 12	2023	Hector Jimenez-Bravo	Olha Martynovska	Volodymyr Yaroslavskyi
Season 13	2024	Hector Jimenez-Bravo	Olha Martynovska	Volodymyr Yaroslavskyi
Season 14	2024	Hector Jimenez-Bravo	Olha Martynovska	Volodymyr Yaroslavskyi
Season 15	2025	Hector Jimenez-Bravo	Olha Martynovska	Volodymyr Yaroslavskyi

=== MasterChef Junior ===
Season	Year	Judges		
Season	Year	1	2	3
Junior 1	2016	Hector Jimenez-Bravo	Tetyana Lytvynova	Mykola Tischenko
Junior 2	2017	Hector Jimenez-Bravo	Tetyana Lytvynova	Dmytro Horovenko

=== MasterChef Teens ===
Season	Year	Judges		
Season	Year	1	2	3
Teens 1	2018	Hector Jimenez-Bravo	Tetyana Lytvynova	Dmytro Horovenko

=== MasterChef Professionals ===
Season	Year	Judges		
Season	Year	1	2	3
Professionals 1	2019	Hector Jimenez-Bravo	Yelyzaveta Hlinska	Volodymyr Yaroslavskyi
Professionals 2	2020	Hector Jimenez-Bravo	Olha Martynovska	Volodymyr Yaroslavskyi
Professionals 3	2021	Hector Jimenez-Bravo	Olha Martynovska	Volodymyr Yaroslavskyi
Professionals 4	2023	Hector Jimenez-Bravo	Olha Martynovska	Volodymyr Yaroslavskyi

== Seasons ==
=== MasterChef ===
Season	Broadcast period	Winner	Finalists	Participants	Number of participants
1	31 August 2011 – 28 December 2011	Svitlana Sheptukha	Anna Tarasenko	Volodymyr Tatarenko, Ihor Misevych, Bohdan Shevlyuha, Elmira Mardyan, Tetyana Slyusarchuk, Daryna Melnyk, Lyudmyla Onyshchenko, Ivan Kamenchuk, Amir Etminani, Lyudmyla Lahutina, Rodion Kifarets, Tetiana Strebkova, Pavlo Sypatin, Yuliya Pankova, Serhiy Zolin, Oleksandr Pratskov, Anton Horb, Yuliya Korobka.	20
2	29 August 2012 – 26 December 2012	Yelyzaveta Hlinska	Tetyana Nemirovets, Mykhailo Sosnovskyi	Oleksandr Bilodid, Ivanna Mironenko, Hanna Zavorotko, Vitaliya Ivashchenko, Henadiy Tsyauk, Oksana Nazarchuk, Alla Kovalchuk, Vladyslav Malakhov, Vitaliy Barilko, Ivan Trushkin, Denys Tsyhuy, Tetyana Marchenko, Ihor Papayani, Anton Alisov, Svitlana Kurinna, Volodymyr Oliynyk, Olga Ilkukhina.	20
3	30 August 2013 – 25 December 2013	Olga Martynovska	Oleh Koshovyi	Iryna Baktiaya, Serhiy Chibar†, Danylo Panov, Nataliya Kovalchuk, Maryna Shevchenko, Andriy Kolisnyk, Anatoliy Tsuperyak, Vasyl Serhiyenko, Alina Zamkovenko, Olena Nuzhna, Hanna Zhyhalyuk, Oleksandra Kolpakova, Oksana Shapovalova, Artem Levytskyi, Dmytro Harmash, Volodymyr Palamarchuk, Artur Avakyan, Valentyn Uzyalo.	20
4	27 August 2014 – 24 December 2014	Yevhen Zlobin	Samvel Adamyan, Oksana Mansyrova	Mykyta Moyseyev, Viktor Perekhrest, Yaroslav Breus, Diana Baboshyna, Dmytro Pavlyukov, Viktoriya Kushnir, Yevhen Polivoda, Anhelina Zavarnytska, Tetyana Katerynovska†, Hanna Mazhnyk, Vita Ladenkova, Oleksiy Kyslov, Ivan Tretyak, Milan Kotev, Maryna Tsurkan, Viktoriya Kozys, Oksana Tsurkan.	20
5	26 August 2015 – 23 December 2015	Yevhen Klopotenko	Kateryna Velyka, Nataliya Levenzon	Maryna Yakovenko, Yuliya Sholudko, Olena Pankevych, Yuliya Prokopenko, Yevhen Herhets, Eldar Volontyorov, Denys Yelynchak, Viktoriya Reznik, Hanna Doronina, Iryna Drabyk, Ihor Lysak, Karyna Ilchenko, Kateryna Kulychenko, Roman Polikarpov, Andriy Dmytrenko, Nato Kovdanya, Artur Khaustov.	20
6	30 August 2016 – 27 December 2016	Asmik Gasparyan	Kateryna Pyeskova	Olena Ivashchuk, Oleh Kovalchuk, Nataliya Petryk, Ruslan Hromov, Viktoriya Korol, Svitlana Bileychuk, Oleksandr Shvets, Yuriy Karmazin, Tetyana Svystunova, Mykola Molokov, Olga Steblyetsova, Tetyana Karsayeva, Mykola Rotar, Ihor Kovtun, Andriy Pavlenko, Hanna Maksymova, Oleksandr Hetmanyuk, Kateryna Semerheyeva.	20
7	29 August 2017 – 27 December 2017	Vadym Bzhezynskyi	Mykhailo Hrushetskyi, Volodymyr Trotskyi.	Yelyzaveta Spodobets, Yevhen Bilyi, Karina Avanesova, Nataliya Chupryk, Maksym Lyzo, Oleksiy Maznitsyn, Yuliya Morozenko, Solomiya Kulba, Valentyna Dyenyezhko, Tomaš Nimet, Yuliya Sudakova, Veronika Shlendyk, Dmytro Shundyk, Olena Troyanska, Mykhailo Dimian, Oleksandra Moldovan, Mariya Rybakina.	20
8	28 August 2018 – 26 December 2018	Ivan Milanovich	Angela Lipska	Serzhik Faynyi, Vladyslav Mitskevych, Elina Pavlenko, Yuliya Burtseva, Lev Markevich, Daryna Tsokalo, Oleksiy Bzitskiy, Maksym Pustovit, Lybov Blyashka, Evgen Kirsanov, Anastasiya Vovk, Vladyslav Kyryakulov, Daryna Ruban, Denys Voytenko, Vira Volga, Ihor Kopus, Dmytro Kravchuk, Mykhailo Halaychuk.	20
9	30 August 2019 – 27 December 2019	Serhiy Denysov	Liliya Sorokina, Ruslan Luchkov	Petro Kosovskyi, Ruslan Shylin, Kieu Thuc Ahn, Oleksandra Efimenko, Yuliya Akimenko, Artem Yankovyi, Andriy Bodenko, Anastasia Pohosova, Eleonora Zubenko, Mariya Kobzeva, Yuliya Klimenko, Nazar Vitkovych, Volodymyr Lyalin, Mariya Hriysay, Natalya Troyan, Olena Khmil, Dmytro Lamza.	20
10	29 August 2020 - 26 December 2020	Yana Baloh	Yuliya Venediktova	Iryna Malenko, Dmytro Balita, Mirra Borisova, Iryna Rakovchen, Mariya Kryvenko, Maryna Kobchuk, Alina Matviychuk, Maryna Shmalko, Oleksandr Horchakov, Bohdan Syrotenko, Kateryna Demyanova, Roman Petrushenko, Ivan Kozyr, Oleksiy Zhydkih, Eduard Mishuga, Aleksa Antonova, Yana Korzh, Oleksiy Savchuk.	20
11	28 August 2021 - 25 December 2021	Bohdan Shynkarev	Vladyslav Yakimets, Svitlana Tkachenko	Oleksandr Kryvets, Yana Lieskova, Bohdan Shynkarev, Vladyslav Yakimets, Diana Kuvaeva, Amador Lopez, Andriy Kaday, Alisa Pyatkova, Serafim Dereha, Yuriy Chuchenko, Olena Dyachenko, Tetyana Ilyina, Tamara Melnykova, Mykhailo Dmitriev, Maryna Faynitska, Evhen Lobanov, Dmytro Dikhtyar, Maksym Samchuk, Daria Evtuh, Vitalina Mktchyan, Svitlana Tkachenko.	21

=== MasterChef Junior ===
Season	Broadcast period	Winner	Finalists	Participants	Number of participants
1	3 February 2016 – 25 May 2016	Anton Buldakov	Volodymyr Motriychuk, Oleksandr Diyamanshteyn	Katya Slivinskaya, Danila Kiva, Vladyslava Khrystenko, Sofiya Dedkova, Nastya Voronaya, Vika Sulima, Sasha Kozyr, Kateryna Dashevska, Nicole Ronci, Nikita Letinsky, Vova Morozyuk, Vanya Tamashev, Kateryna Ilyashik, Ivan Zadvorny, Nikita Milevskiy, Isaac Velichko, Denys Semontyk.	20
2	31 January 2017 – 30 May 2017	Maryna Litvinenko	Viktoriya Podlipinska, Mariya Syrota	Davyd Mitko, Ilya Vasyutinsky, Dasha Marfina, Denys Taran, Ksenia Slobodska, Sofiya Shidlik, Ilana Reznik, Maksym Ganaha, Darya Hudym, Eva Filipenko, Katya Zhuravlyova, Dasha Lutsenko, Vova Hoychuk, Olexandra Chumak, Ivan Vyshnivetsky, Denys Shapoval, Maksym Cherevko, Eva Braylovska.	21

=== MasterChef Teens ===
Broadcast period	Winner	Finalists	Participants	Number of participants
31 January 2018 – 30 May 2018	Anastasiya Kobyliatska	Karolina Zalevska, Tetiana Kurilenko	Yuriy Turchyn, Oleksandr Lukomskyi, Oleh Pakhomenko, Yaroslav Verkholyak, Arthur Malyarenko, Oleksandr Shulga, Mark Levinskiy, Myroslava Standartiyk, Nataliya Makohon, Evhenia Antoshyk, Mariya Yakivchuk, Liza Didkovska, Yaroslav Hrynchuk, Hevorg Halstyan, Ihor Fomenko, Anton Kvasov, Dasha Serheeva.	20

=== MasterChef: The Professionals ===
Season	Broadcast period	Winner	Finalists	Participants	Number of participants
1	2 March 2019 - 1 June 2019	Pavlo Servetnyk	Yuliya Prokhoda, Yuriy Nehrych	Kateryna Pyeskova, Alik Mkrtchan, Oleksandr Abramov, Pavlo Kliychnyk, Kostyantyn Laypakov, Dmytro Kasap, Kateryna Yablonska, Dmytro Shevchenko, Yuliya Anhelova, Nadija Borys, Artem Kinash, Oleksandr Maslov.	15
2	29 February - 18 July 2020	Evhen Grybenyk	Oleksandr Tsvygun, Eduard Kanaryan	Yana Gamarnyk, Maksym Vysotskyi, Yuriy Poberezhnyk, Mykola Karpyuk, David Danielyan, Valentyn Braychuk, Svitlana Berk, Anastasiya Kobyliatska, Viktor Samardak, Efim Kravchenko, Oleksandra Kasyanova, Anatoliy Tsuperyak, Vladyslav Mitskevych, Yuliya Zhygulina, Vladyslav Ermakov, Mykyta Alimov, Volodymyr Chahmahchan.	20
3	6 February - 5 June 2021	Eleonora Baranova	Mykolay Liulko, Viktor Shaydetskyi	Leonid Malyuha, Dmytro Kuznetsov, Ihor Andriyash, Radek Konechny, Volodymyr Yurin, Vitaliy Nuzhnyi, Nelya Badamshyna, Mykola Migal, Ruslan Iakovlev, Mykola Ovcharenko, Liliya Stoyanova, Vladyslav Tsymbaliuk, Stella Klymenko†, Lidya Kornienko, Maryna Sobko, Vladyslav Davydenko, Ihor Mishenko.	20

=== MasterChef: Celebrity ===
Battle	Red team		Score	Blue team	
Battle	Name	Occupation	Score	Name	Occupation
1	Olya Polyakova	singer	5:1	Dasha Astafieva	model
1	Tayanna	singer	5:1	Nadia Meiher	singer-songwriter
1	Alina Grosu	singer	5:1	Olya Tsybulska	singer
2	Alik Mkrtchan	chef	6:0	Kateryna Pyeskova	chef
2	Kostyantyn Laypakov	chef	6:0	Kateryna Yablonska	chef
2	Vladyslav Tsymbaliuk	chef	6:0	Efim Kravchenko	chef
3	Dana Okhanska	TV personality, model	1:5	Andriy Rybak	comedian, TV personality
3	Antonia-Jessica Cheni	TV personality	1:5	Illya Rybalchenko	TV personality
3	Yuliya Belchenko	TV personality, model	1:5	Oleksiy Trehubenko	TV personality
4	Olena Shoptenko	dancer	4:2	Nadia Matveeva	TV host
4	Irina Fedishin	singer	4:2	Mishel Andrade	singer
4	Svitlana Volnova	actress	4:2	Aleksandra Zaritska	singer
5	Vitaliy Kozlovskiy	singer	1:5	Pavlo Kostytsyn	TV host
5	Volodymyr Zhoglo	comedian	1:5	Yuriy Tkach	comedian, actor
5	Oleksiy Surovtsev	actor	1:5	Pavel Vishnyakov	actor
6	Olha Sumska	actress	1:5	Vitaliy Borysiuk	actor
6	Snizhana Babkina	actress	1:5	Serhiy Babkin	singer
6	Antonina Matviyenko	singer	1:5	Arsen Mirzoyan	singer
7	Yana Zayets	dancer	2:4	Yevhen Kot	dancer
7	Juliya Sakhnevych	dancer	2:4	Dmytro Dikusar	dancer
7	Khrystyna Shyshpor	ballerina	2:4	Andriy Dykyi	choreographer
8	Natalia Mohylevska	singer	4:2	Dmytro Kadnay	singer, musician
8	Pavlo Zibrov	singer	4:2	Jerry Heil	singer-songwriter
8	Oleh Skrypka	musician	4:2	Ivan Navi	singer
9	Jamala	singer	1:5	Monro	drag queen
9	Oleg Kenzov	singer	1:5	Ilona Gvozdeva	dancer
9	Dmytro Kolyadenko	showman	1:5	Amador López	choreographer
10	MamaRika	singer	5:1	Serhiy Sereda	comedian
10	Alyosha	singer	5:1	Taras Topolya	singer
10	Katerina Tishkevich	model	5:1	Valentin Tomusyak	actor
11	Daria Tregubova	actress, TV host	3:3	Slava Kaminska	singer
11	Olexandr Pedan	TV host	3:3	Hanna Rizatdinova	rhythmic gymnast
11	Irakli Makatsaria	producer	3:3	Anastasiya Kumeyko	singer, dj
12	Liliana Yama	blogger	1:5	Vladyslav Yama	dancer
12	Kseniya Mishyna	actress	1:5	Oleksandr Ellert	actor
12	Krystyna Reshetnik	blogger	1:5	Hrihory Reshetnik	TV host

=== Returns ===
Contestant	First Appearance		Second Appearance	
Contestant	Season	Place	Season	Place
Yuliya Sholudko	Four	Top-30	Fifth	5th
Kateryna Pyeskova	Sixth	Runner-Up	First (The Professionals)	4th
Anton Kvasov	First (Teens)	21st	Ninth	Top-100
Anatoliy Tsuperyak	Third	9th	Second (The Professionals)	13th
Anastasiya Kobyliatska	First (Teens)	Winner	Second (The Professionals)	12th
Vladyslav Mitskevych	Eighth	4th	Second (The Professionals)	11th
Efim Kravchenko	First (The Professionals)	Top-21	Second (The Professionals)	8th
Liudmyla Dederchuk	Eighth	Top-30	Tenth	Top-100
Amador López	Celebrity	Winning team	Eleventh	18th

== Contestants ==
=== MasterChef ===
==== Season 1: 2011 ====
Contestant		Age	Occupation	Hometown
1	Svetlana Sheptukha	25	Accountant	Donetsk
2	Anna Tarasenko	27	Manager	Kharkiv
3	Volodymyr Tatarenko	28	Manager	Lviv
3	Ihor Misevych	38	Veterinarian	Kitsman
5	Bohdan Shevlyuha	24	Unemployed	Dnipro
6	Elmira Mardyan	53	Housewife	Lviv
7	Tetyana Slyusarchuk	40	Housewife	Zalishchyky
8	Daryna Melnyk	21	Journalist	Kyiv
9	Lyudmyla Onyshchenko	42	Music teacher	Smila
10	Ivan Kamenchuk	24	Teacher	Zhytomyr
11	Amir Etminani	26	Foreign trade manager	Kyiv
12	Lyudmyla Lahutina	25	Financier	Boryspil
12	Rodion Kifarets	37	Financier	Donetsk
14	Tetiana Strebkova	28	Store manager	Simferopol
15	Pavlo Sypatin	22	Engineer	Zaporizhia
16	Yuliya Pankova	21	Student	Kyiv
17	Serhiy Zolin	54	Engineer	Zaporizhia
18	Oleksandr Pratskov (Quit)	28	CEO	Kropyvnytskyi
19	Anton Horb	20	Banker	Dnipro
20	Yuliya Korobka	31	Dance teacher	Kyiv

==== Season 2: 2012 ====
Contestant		Age	Occupation	Hometown	Episode of elimination
1	Yelyzaveta Hlinska	29	Visagiste	Kyiv	Final
2	Tetyana "Tanya" Nemirovets	25	Seller	Hoholiv	Final
2	Mykhailo Sosnovskyi	28	Sailor	Chornomorske	Final
4	Oleksandr Bilodid	28	Accountant	Kharkiv	Episode 17
5	Ivanna Mironenko	23	Housewife	Zaporizhzhia	Episode 17
6	Hanna Zavorotko	34	Housewife	Simferopol	Episode 16
7	Vitaliya Ivashchenko	24	Barista	Kyiv	Episode 15
7	Henadiy Tsyauk	43	Driver	Kyiv	Episode 15
9	Alla Kovalchuk	48	Housewife	Kremenchuk	Episode 14
9	Oksana Nazarchuk	25	Waitress	Prylutske	Episode 14
11	Vladyslav Malakhov	38	Auto electrician	Dnipro	Episode 13
12	Vitaliy Barilko	23	Banker	Ternopil	Episode 12
13	Ivan Trushkin	32	Lawyer	Kharkiv	Episode 10
14	Denys Tsyhuy	22	Beekeeper	Okny	Episode 9
15	Tetyana Marchenko	29	Housewife	Trypillia	Episode 8
16	Ihor Papayani	44	Engineer	Kyiv	Episode 7
16	Anton Alisov	27	Self employed	Kyiv	Episode 7
18	Svitlana Kurinna	59	Economist	Kyiv	Episode 5
19	Volodymyr Oliynyk	29	Teacher	Vilshanka	Episode 4
20	Olga Ilkukhina	28	Nurse	Sumy	Episode 3

==== Season 3: 2013 ====
Contestant		Age	Occupation	Hometown
1	Olga Martynovska	23	Florist	Mykolayiv
2	Oleh Koshovyi	23	Electrician	Bila Tserkva
4	Iryna Baktiaya	26	Hotel and Restaurant Business Manager	Kyiv
4	Serhiy Chibar†	30	Unemployed	Konstantinovka
5	Danylo Panov	28	Law Firm Manager	Kyiv
6	Nataliya Kovalchuk	57	Seller	Odesa
7	Maryna Shevchenko	31	Hairdresser	Kryvyi Rih
8	Andriy Kolisnyk	22	Cook	Kharkiv
9	Anatoliy Tsuperyak	23	Lawyer	Neresnitsa
10	Vasyl Serhiyenko	45	Trades in the Forex Market	Mykolayiv
11	Alina Zamkovenko	23	Housewife	Brovary
12	Olena Nuzhna	23	Accountant	Odesa
13	Hanna Zhyhalyuk	30	Domestic Servant	Uman
14	Oleksandra Kolpakova	25	Internat Company Specialist	Kyiv
15	Oksana Shapovalova	43	Realtor	Kyiv
16	Artem Levytskyi	31	Chief of a Passenger Train	Zaporizhzhia
17	Dmytro Harmash	24	Train Conductor	Kyiv
18	Volodymyr Palamarchuk	18	Student	Sevastopol
19	Arthur Avakyan	26	Hairdresser	Georgia
20	Valentyna Uzyalo	50	Nurse	Kyiv

==== Season 4: 2014 ====
Contestant		Age	Occupation	Hometown	Episode of elimination
1	Yevhen "Zhenya" Zlobin	30	Furniture Master	Mariupol	Final
2	Oksana "Ksenia" Mansyrova	20	Shop assistant	Dykanka	Final
3	Samvel Adamyan	32	Opera singer	Dnipro	Final
4	Nikita Moyseyev	24	Waiter	Odesa	Episode 17
5	Viktor Perekhrest	18	Shoe maker	Kyiv	Episode 12, 17
6	Yaroslav Breus	20	Cook assistant	Mena	Episode 16
7	Diana Baboshyna	21	Waiter	Luhansk	Episode 15
7	Dmytro Pavlyukov	26	Events presenter	Dnipro	Episode 15
9	Viktoriya "Vika" Kushnir	33	Translation teacher	Sevastopol	Episode 14
10	Yevhen Polivoda	19	Cook	Myrnohrad	Episode 13
11	Anhelina Zavarnytska	21	Student	Sevastopol	Episode 10
11	Tetyana Katerynovska†	60	Nurse	Kyiv	Episode 10
13	Hanna Mazhnyk	21	Cashier	Kharkiv	Episode 9
14	Vita Ladenkova	35	Housewife	Mariupol	Episode 8
15	Oleksiy Kyslov	39	Repairman	Alchevsk	Episode 6
15	Ivan Tretyak	23	Student	Lviv	Episode 6
17	Milan Kotev	22	Theater scene engineer	Vyshhorod	Episode 5
18	Maryna Tsurkan	28	Lawyer	Kyiv	Episode 4
19	Viktoriya Kozys	45	Housewife	Kropyvnytskyi	Episode 3
20	Oksana Tsurkan	28	Philologist	Kyiv	Episode 3

==== Season 5: 2015 ====
Pl.	Contestant	Age	Occupation	Hometown	Episode of elimination
1	Yevhen Klopotenko	28	Jam Maker	Kyiv	Final
2	Kateryna Velyka	34	Traveler	Kyiv	Final
3	Nataliya Levenzon	37	Housewife	Odesa	Final
4	Maryna Yakovenko	29	Head of call center	Kyiv	Semi-Final
5	Yuliya Sholudko	25	TV presenter	Cherkasy / Kyiv	Semi-Final
6	Olena Pankevych	37	Businesswoman	Izium	Semi-Final
7	Yevhen "Zhenya" Herhets	23	Sailor-minder	Zaporizhia	Episode 16
8	Yuliya Prokopenko	28	Nurse	Bakhmut	Episode 16 (DSQ)
9	Eldar Volontyorov	18	Builder	Melitopol	Episode 3, 15
10	Denys Yelynchak	19	Student	Odesa	Episode 14
10	Viktoriya Reznik	29	Teacher	Izium	Episode 14
12	Hanna Doronina	30	Psychologist	Kyiv	Episode 13
13	Iryna Drabyk	24	Realtor	Ternopil	Episode 11
14	Ihor Lysak	22	Unemployed	Vinnytsia	Episode 10
15	Karyna Ilchenko	25	Hairdresser	Kharkiv	Episode 9
16	Kateryna Kulychenko	18	Student	Mykolaiv	Episode 8
17	Roman Polikarpov	32	Musician	Kyiv	Episode 7
18	Andriy Dmytrenko	28	Unemployed	Kyiv	Episode 6
19	Nato Kovdanya	51	Brigadier	Kyiv	Episode 5
20	Artur Khaustov	45	Businessman	Odesa	Episode 3

==== Season 6: 2016 ====
Contestant	Age	Occupation	Hometown	Episode of elimination	Place finished
Asmik Gasparyan	32	Manicurist	Kyiv	Final	Winner
Kateryna Pyeskova	25	Businesswoman	Odesa	Final	Runner-up
Olena Ivashchuk	29	Accountant	Rivne	Semi-Final	3rd / 4th
Oleh Kovalchuk	34	Stone Painter	Korostyshiv	Semi-Final	3rd / 4th
Nataliya Petryk	21	Student	Lviv	Semi-Final	5th
Ruslan Hromov	28	Diplomat	Chernivtsi	Semi-Final	6th
Viktoriya Korol	39	Sales Manager	Kyiv	Episode 32	7th
Svitlana Bileychuk	40	Housewife	Troitsa	Episode 30	8th
Oleksandr "Sasha" Shvets	21	Chiseler	Rozdilna	Episode 28	9th
Yuriy Karmazin	25	Soldier	Vitebsk / Kyiv	Episode 24	10th
Tetyana Svystunova	55	Director	Lviv	Episode 22	11th / 12th
Mykola Molokov†	64	Instructor	Kyiv	Episode 22	11th / 12th
Olga Steblyetsova	38	Teacher	Odesa	Episode 18	13th
Tetyana Karsayeva	22	Student	Dnipro	Episode 14	14th (Withdrawn)
Mykola Rotar	24	Shepherd	Henichesk	Episode 14	15th
Ihor Kovtun	25	Sailor	Odesa	Episode 12	16th
Andriy Pavlenko	28	Strategist	Kyiv	Episode 10	17th
Hanna "Anna" Maksymova	26	Financier	Kyiv	Episode 8	18th / 19th
Oleksandr Hetmanyuk	32	Taxi driver	Novi Petrivtsi	Episode 8	18th / 19th
Kateryna "Katya" Semerheyeva	29	SMM Manager	Berdiansk	Episode 6	20th

==== Season 7: 2017 ====
Contestant		Age	Occupation	Hometown	Episode of elimination
1	Vadym "Pava" Bzhezynskyi	29	Facade Developer	Kamianske	Final
2	Mykhailo "Mykha" Hrushetskyi	26	Firefighter	Kharkiv	Final
3	Volodymyr Trotskyi	27	Waiter	Mariupol / Kyiv	Final
4	Yelyzaveta Spodobets	20	Programmer	Dnipro	Semi-Final
5	Yevhen "Zhenya" Bilyi	21	Chef	Lyubymivka	Semi-Final
6	Karyna Avanesova	46	Lawyer	Netishyn	Semi-Final
7	Nataliya Chupryk	35	Housewife	Buryn	Episode 32
8	Maksim Lyzo	25	Lawyer	Chervyen	Quit in ep. 16 / Episode 30
8	Oleksiy Maznitsin	30	Businessman	Kharkiv	Episode 30
10	Yuliya Morozenko	33	Businesswoman	Kamianske	Episode 28
11	Solomiya Kulba	25	Model	Lviv	Episode 20, 26
12	Valentina Dyenyezhko	65	Confectioner	Odesa	Episode 22
13	Tomaš Nimet	30	Lawyer	Odesa	Episode 18
14	Yuliya Sudakova	31	Food coach	Kyiv	Episode 16
15	Veronika Shlendyk	23	Painter-plasterer	Horishni Plavni	Episode 14
16	Dmytro Shundyk	35	In the decree	Irpin	Episode 10
17	Olena Troyanska	32	Cosmetologist	Dnipro	Episode 8
17	Mykhailo Dimian	20	Seller	Solotvyno	Episode 8
17	Oleksandra Moldovan	25	Marketer	Chernivtsi	Episode 8
20	Mariya Rybakina	33	Housewife	Mykolaiv	Episode 6

==== Season 8: 2018 ====
Pl.	Contestant	Age	Occupation	Hometown	Episode of elimination
1	Ivan Milanovich	25	Online marketer	Bali	Final
2	Angela Lipska	51	Traveler	Odesa	Final
3	Serzhik Faynyi	20	Student	Kyiv	Episode 34
4	Vladyslav "Vlad" Mitskevych	23	Sales Manager	Kyiv	Episode 33 - Part 2
5	Elina Pavlenko	19	Instagram Model	Mykolaiv	Episode 33 - Part 1
6	Yuliya Burtseva	40	Housewife	Mykolaiv	Episode 32
7	Lev Markevych	31	Businessman	Kyiv	Episode 30
8	Daryna Tsokalo	20	Nanny	Poltava	Episode 28
9	Oleksiy Bzhitskiy	32	Repairer	Kharkiv	Episode 26
10	Maksym Pustovit	20	Confectioner	Oleshky	Episode 24
11	Lybov Blyashka	36	Housewife	Uzhgorod	Episode 22
12	Evhen Kirsanov	31	Psychologist	Kyiv	Episode 20
13	Anastasiya Vovk	21	Confectioner	Kyiv	Episode 16
13	Vladyslav Kyryakulov	35	Masseur	Kyiv	Episode 16
15	Daryna "Darynka" Ruban	20	Director	Zmitniv	Episode 14
15	Denys Voytenko	29	Journalist	Skolobov	Episode 14
17	Vira Volga	70	Cook	Kharkiv	Episode 12
18	Ihor Kopus	27	Hairdresser	Koziatyn	Episode 10
19	Dmytro Kravchuk	21	Waiter	Lutsk	Episode 8
20	Mykhailo Halaychuk	33	Naturist	Ivano-Frankivsk	Episode 6

==== Season 9: 2019 ====
Pl	Contestant	Age	Occupation	Hometown	Episode of elimination
1	Serhiy Denysov	26	businessman	Donetsk / Batumi	Winner
2	Ruslan Luchkov	31	drag queen	Kherson	Runner-Ups
2	Liliya Sorokina	28	art director	Kamianets-Podilskyi	Runner-Ups
4	Kieu "Annushka" Thuc Ahn	23	food photographer	Kharkiv	Episode 17
4	Petro Kosovskyi	21	policeman	Odesa	Episode 17
4	Ruslan Shylin	20	provisor	Lokhvytsia / Lviv	Episode 17
7	Oleksandra Efimenko	23	housewife	Melitopol	Episode 17 (WRD)
8	Yuliya Akimenko	25	blogger	Yalta / Kyiv	Episode 16
9	Artem Yankovyi	32	exporter	Aalborg	Episode 15
10	Andriy Bodenko	27	lawyer	Kharkiv	Episode 13
11	Anastasia Pohosova	41	businesswoman	Mykolaiv	Episode 12
12	Eleonora Zubenko	24	housewife	Polohy	Episode 10
13	Mariya Kobzeva	27	air hostess	Kaniv	Episode 9
14	Yuliya Klimenko	23	yoga instructor	Kyiv	Episode 8
15	Nazar Vitkovych	22	translator	Lviv	Episode 7
16	Volodymyr Lyalin	23	blogger	Kryvyi Rih	Episode 5
17	Mariya Hritsay	19	etiquette teacher	Alchevsk	Episode 4
17	Natalya Troyan	43	—	Ternopil	Episode 4
19	Olena Khmil	37	businesswoman	Kyiv	Episode 3
19	Dmytro Lamza	26	head teacher	Melitopol	Episode 3

==== Season 10: 2020 ====
Contestant		Age	Occupation	Hometown	Episode of elimination
1	Yana Baloh	23	medical student	Mukachevo / Uzhgorod	Winner
2	Yuliya Venediktova	30	beauty salon owner	Kharkiv	Runner-Up
3	Iryna Malenko	34	educator	Oleksandriia	Episode 17
3	Dmytro Balita	24	wedding host	Kalush / Lviv	Episode 17
5	Mirra Borisova	35	designer	Kyiv	Episode 17 (DSQ)
6	Iryna "Ira" Rakovchen	23	badminton player	Kyiv	Episode 17
6	Mariya Kryvenko	24	model	Odesa / Kyiv	Episode 17
8	Maryna Kobchuk	21	hockey player	Irpin	Episode 16
9	Alina Matviychuk	25	process engineer	Kamianets-Podilskyi / Brussels	Episode 15
10	Maryna Shmalko	33	stylist	Kyiv	Episode 14
11	Oleksandr Horchakov	35	sauce seller	Vinnytsia	Episode 13
12	Bohdan Syrotenko	27	designer	Odesa	Episode 11
13	Kateryna Demyanova	27	police officer	Kyiv	Episode 10
14	Roman Petrushenko	36	miner	Kropyvnytskyi	Episode 9
15	Ivan Kozyr	33	bodybuilder	Dnipro	Episode 8
16	Oleksiy Zhydkih	30	teacher	Mykolaiv	Episode 7
17	Eduard Mishuga	28	programmer	Kharkiv	Episode 6
18	Aleksa Antonova	25	it specialist	Kyiv	Episode 5
19	Yana Korzh	23	psychologist	Cherkasy	Episode 4
20	Oleksiy Savchuk	38	electrician	Lviv	Episode 3

==== Season 11: 2021 ====
Contestant		Age	Occupation	Hometown	Episode of elimination
1	Bohdan Shynkarev	29	poker player	Kharkiv	Finale
2	Vladyslav Yakimets	24	seller	Trypillia	Finale
3	Svitlana Tkachenko	42	railroad worker	Kostiantynivka	Finale
4	Evhen Lobanov	35	manager	Kyiv	Episode 18
5	Yana Lieskova	30	makeup artist	Kyiv	Episode 17
6	Oleksandr Kryvets	19	film director	Kharkiv	Episode 17
7	Serafim Dereha	23	son of a priest	Bila Tserkva	Episode 17
8	Maryna Faynitska	40	blogger	Krivyi Rih	Episode 16
9	Maksym Samchuk	24	model	Kyiv	Episode 15
10	Mykhailo Dmitriev	35	businessman	Irpin	Episode 14
11	Daria Evtuh	23	TikToker	Bohodarivka	Episode 13
12	Alisa Pyatkova	25	journalist	Vasylkiv	Episode 12
13	Dmytro Dikhtyar	26	ballet dancer	Kyiv	Episode 11
14	Vitalina Mktchyan	31	tv personality	Kyiv	Episode 9
15	Andriy Kaday	28	policeman	Lviv	Episode 9 (Withdrawn)
16	Tetyana Ilyina	23	musical director	Krasyliv	Episode 8
17	Diana Kuvaeva	25	TikToker	Kyiv	Episode 7
18	Amador Lopez	38	showman	Kyiv	Episode 6
19	Olena Dyachenko	39	tv host	Mykolaiv	Episode 5
20	Tamara Melnykova	40	overlooker	Kharkiv	Episode 4
21	Yuriy Chuchenko	34	screenwriter	Kyiv	Episode 3

==== Season 12: 2023 ====
Contestant		Age	Hometown	Episode of elimination
1	Valeria Matrohina	24	Luhansk	Winner
2	Olha Ryabenko	38	Kyiv	Runner-up
3	Viktoria Naumenko	32	Vinnytsia	Finale
3	Roman Nesterchuk	33	Bucha	Finale
5	Kateryna Radchenko	26	Berdiansk	Episode 17
6	Illya Harlamov	40	Kyiv	Episode 17
7	Ruslan Batylchuk	19	Zhytomyr	Episode 17
8	Mykola Petrovskyi	27	Lviv	Episode 15
9	Iryna Davydenko	23	Kaniv	Episode 14
10	Oleksandr Kozyarchuk	24	Rivne	Episode 13
11	Oksana Shevchenko	56	Kharkiv	Episode 12
12	Yuliya Markovetska	38	Rivne	Episode 11
13	Myroslava Pekariuk	-	Dilove	Episode 10
14	Maryna Shvets	23	Petropavlivska Borshchahivka	Episode 9
15	Ivan Peshyi	34	Kyiv	Episode 8
16	Dmytro Davydenko	41	Seattle, WA	Episode 7
17	Artem Pereskokov	34	Donetsk	Episode 6
18	Petro Fediushko	22	Rivne	Episode 5
19	Hanna Skachko	41	Odesa	Episode 4
20	Tetyana Shtainbrunn	41	Wissembourg	Episode 3

=== MasterChef All Stars ===
Contestant		Previous Season		Age	Hometown	Episode of elimination
Contestant		№	Placing	Age	Hometown	Episode of elimination
1	Oleksandr Tsvigun	Season P2	2nd	22	Irpin	Winner
2-3	Oleksandr Bilodid	Season 2	4th	38	Kharkiv	Final
2-3	Vladyslav Mitskevych	Season 8	4th	26	Kyiv	Final
4	Vadym Bzhezynskyi	Season 7	1st	33	Kamianske	Episode 18
5-6	Kateryna Velyka	Season 5	2nd	41	Kyiv	Episode 17
5-6	Pavlo Servetnyk	Season P1	1st	26	Komyshany	Episode 17
7	Vladyslav Tsymbaliuk	Season P3	5th	33	Kyiv	Episode 16
8	Iryna Rakovchen	Season 10	6th	24	Kyiv	Episode 15
9	Oleksandr Kryvets	Season 11	6th	19	Kharkiv	Episode 14
10	Yana Baloh	Season 10	1st	24	Kyiv	Episode 12
11	Nataliya Petryk	Season 6	5th	26	Lvov	Episode 11
12	Angela Lipska	Season 8	2nd	54	Odesa	Episode 10
13	Andriy Kolisnyk	Season 3	8th	29	Kharkiv	Episode 8
14	Dmytro Balita	Season 10	4th	25	Lvov	Episode 7
15-16	Oleh Kovalchuk	Season 6	3rd	39	Korostyshiv	Episode 5
15-16	Viktor Perekhrest	Season 4	5th	26	Kyiv	Episode 5
17	Anastasiya Kobyliatska	Season "Teens"	1st	20	Kharkiv	Episode 4
18	Dmytro Shevchenko	Season P1	11th	28	Kyiv	Episode 3
19	Serafim Dereha	Season 11	7th	23	Bila Tserkva	Episode 2
20	Ruslan Luchkov	Season 9	2nd	33	Kherson	Episode 1

=== MasterChef: The Professionals ===
==== Season 1: 2019 ====
Pl.	Contestant	Age	Hometown	Episode of elimination
1	Pavlo Servetnyk	24	Kamyshany	Final
2	Yuliya Prokhoda	30	Avdiivka	Final
2	Yuriy Nehrych	21	Chernivtsi	Final
4	Kateryna Pyeskova	27	Odesa	Episode 14
4	Alik Mkrtchan	34	Kyiv	Episode 14
4	Oleksandr Abramov	42	Kyiv	Episode 14
7	Pavlo Kliychnyk	33	Kyiv	Episode 13
8	Kostyantyn Laypakov	34	Kyiv	Episode 12
9	Dmytro Kasap	24	Odesa	Episode 10
10	Kateryna Yablonska	32	Odesa	Episode 9
11	Dmytro Shevchenko	26	Kyiv	Episode 8
12	Yuliya Anhelova	32	Odesa	Episode 7
13	Nadija Borys	43	Ivano-Frankivsk	Episode 6
13	Artem Kinash	18	Kharkiv	Episode 4
15	Oleksandr Maslov	26	Kyiv	Episode 3

==== Season 2: 2020 ====
Pl.	Contestant	Age	Hometown	Episode of elimination
1	Evhen Grybenyk	35	Kyiv	Winner
2	Oleksandr Tsvygun	21	Irpin	Finale
2	Eduard Kanaryan	29	Kyiv	Finale
4	David Danielyan	29	Yerevan	Finale
4	Vladyslav Ermakov	32	Kharkiv	Finale
6	Yuliya Zhygulina	28	Kyiv	Episode 20
7	Viktor Samardak	31	Kyiv	Episode 19
8	Efim Kravchenko	19	Kyiv	Episode 18
9	Mykyta Alimov	27	Kyiv	Episode 16
10	Maksym Vysotskyi	27	Kharkiv	Episode 15
11	Vladyslav Mitskevych	24	Kyiv	Episode 14
12	Anastasiya Kobyliatska	19	Kharkiv	Episode 11
13	Anatoliy Tsuperyak	30	Neresnytsia	Episode 10
14	Volodymyr Chahmahchan	31	Odesa	Episode 8
15	Yuriy Poberezhnyk	20	Lviv	Episode 6
16	Svitlana Berk	45	Kyiv	Episode 5
17	Valentyn Braychuk	20	Kyiv	Episode 4
18	Oleksandra Kasyanova	23	Kharkiv	Episode 3
18	Mykola Karpyuk	19	Ivano-Frankivsk	Episode 3
18	Yana Gamarnyk	31	Bohuslav	Episode 3
