= Olga Frolova =

Russian orientalist

Olga Pavlovna Frolova
- Born: 1931; Manchuria, China
- Died: 2018 (aged 86–87)
- Citizenship: Russian Federation
- Scientific career
- Fields: Japanese and Chinese studies
- Workplaces: Novosibirsk State University

Olga Pavlovna Frolova (Russian: Óльга Пáвловна Фролóва; 1931–2018) was a Russian orientalist who wrote her major works on the Japanese and Chinese linguistics. She was a professor and a public figure. She received such State Rewards as the Order of the Rising Sun (4th Class, Gold Rays with Rosette) in 2007, The Order of Merit for the Fatherland (2nd Class) in 2010, etc. She was latterly head of the Oriental Branch at the Foreign Languages Department of Novosibirsk State University (NSU). Frolova died in 2018.

== Biography ==
=== Early life and education ===
Olga Pavlovna Frolova (Chernykh) was born in Manchuria, Northeast China, to a family of Russian immigrants. Her father, Pavel Pavlovich Chernykh, was a construction and railway engineer. Her mother, Natalia Aleksandrovna Chernych, was a teacher of Russian. They descended from a noble family that moved to China after the Russian Revolution in 1917. Their family kept Russian Orthodox traditions. Olga Pavlovna and two her sisters got a good education.

In 1937 she entered in a Japanese school in Shanhaiguan, Hebei province.
In 1938 her family moved to Harbin, where Frolova continued her education in Japanese school.
In 1945–1949 she studied in a Russian middle school in Harbin.
In 1949–1951 she was a student of Harbin Institute of Technology (School of Oriental Economics).
In 1954 Frolova together with her family moved to the USSR, where she continued her education.
In 1955–1960 she was a student of Novosibirsk State Pedagogical Institute, where she specialized in English and German languages.
In 1978 she defended her doctoral dissertation in philology “Word-formation in Modern Chinese Terminology” in the Institute of Oriental Studies of the USSR Academy of Sciences in Moscow.

=== Career ===
In 1951–1952 Frolova worked as a teacher of the Russian language in the Northeast People's University (Changchun, China).
In 1953–1954 worked as a teacher of the Russian language in PLA Military Engineering Academy (Harbin, China).
In 1954–1955 after she had moved to the USSR she was a secretary at a long-distance call-office in Stolbovo, Altai Krai.
In 1958–1961 she was a translator of Chinese, English and German in Kuznetsk Branch of Design-Development Testing Institute "Giprouglemash".
In 1961–1968 Frolova was a translator of Chinese, Japanese, English and German and a junior research assistant in the Institute of Cytology and Genetics, Siberian Branch of the Russian Academy of Sciences.
In 1968 she started her career in the NSU, where she worked as assistant (1968–1971), as head teacher (1971–1979), as assistant professor (1979–1995), as professor of the Department of Humanities (1995–1999), as professor of the Foreign Languages Department (from 1999).
In 1981–1999 Frolova was a member of the Academic Council of the NSU Humanities Department. And in 2001 she became a member of the Academic Council of the NSU Foreign Languages Department.
In 1990–1997 she held methodological conferences to improve skills of Japanese language teachers in Novosibirsk schools.

=== Social activity ===
In 1993 Olga Pavlovna Frolova together with her students founded the Association of Japanese Language Teachers.
In 1992–1999 she was a president of Novosibirsk-Sapporo Association.
In 1980–1991 she was a translator of Japanese in the Novosibirsk City Hall. She made an important contribution into the development of Russian-Japanese relations, i.e. Novosibirsk was twinned with Sapporo. Then in 1996 Siberia-Hokkaido cultural center was founded. The aim of this center was cultural exchange and strengthening of international relations between the two countries and especially between the twin cities.
In 1970–1990 Frolova organized seminars devoted to Japanese and Chinese culture that were held in the House of Scientists (Siberian Branch of the Russian Academy of Sciences). These seminars were a matter of great interest to many people in Novosibirsk.
In 1964–1994 she worked as a translator of the international conferences and seminars, for official tours of Chinese and Japanese delegations, for official representatives and research organizations.
In 1994 she became a member of the noble society in Novosibirsk.

== Principal research areas ==
- Actual problems of lexicology, phraseology, terminology and word-formation of the Chinese and Japanese languages
- Linguistic aspects of Japanese communicative behavior
- Aspects of scientific and technical translation from the Chinese and Japanese
- Expressive means of the Chinese and Japanese languages
- Intercultural communication and language teaching theory for the Chinese and Japanese languages

== Contribution to Japanese and Chinese studies ==
Thanks to professor Frolova’s efforts and talent, Novosibirsk State University set a base for studying Chinese (1970) and Japanese (since 1971) languages and oriental culture. She brought up several generations of specialists who work both in Russia and abroad. Professor Frolova was invited to Japan and China several times to give lectures on the Chinese and Japanese languages teaching methodology, and her methodology (so-called “Frolova’s school”) received wide recognition. Many of her students keep in touch with their teacher for many years. Olga Pavlovna herself keeps contacts with her elderly teacher of Japanese: Higaki Mikio. Frolova made important contributions to Chinese and Japanese linguistics: she collected, arranged and analyzed extensive data on terminology, word formation, phraseology, and she also wrote a number of theoretical and practical study manuals. As a unique specialist, she carried on with educating and social work in Novosibirsk.

== Rewards and honorary titles ==
- April 29, 2007 The Order of the Rising Sun (4th Class, Gold Rays with Rosette) for her achievements in the development of cultural and business relations between Japan and Russia, and for her contribution to the teaching of Japanese language, culture and traditions.
- May 15, 2010 The Order of Merit for the Fatherland (2nd Class) for her achievements in work.
- 2010 Commemorative Medal from the Russian side on the 20th anniversary of the establishment of twin-cities relations between Novosibirsk (Russia) and Sapporo (Japan).
- 2010 Commemorative Medal from the Japanese side on the 20th anniversary of the establishment of twin-cities relations between Novosibirsk (Russia) and Sapporo (Japan).
- 2003 Commemorative Medal on the 110th anniversary of the founding of the city of Novosibirsk – "For fruitful work on behalf of the City".
- 1999 Letter of award from the Ministry of Higher and Professional Education of the Russian Federation for academic, pedagogical, methodological and educational work and a great contribution to training of specialists and the introduction of new methods into the educational process.
- Honorary titles: Honored Veteran of the Siberian Branch of the USSR Academy of Sciences (1990), NSU Veteran (1987), and Labour Veteran (2001).

=== As subject of articles ===
- Лошкарева О. Посол Японии в России встретился со старейшим преподавателем-японистом НГУ // «Твой городок» от 11 апреля 2007. O. Loshkareva, "Japanese Ambassador to Russia Meeting with NSU Senior Japanese Teacher" (published in Tvoi Gorodok, April 11, 2007).
- Юрченко О. Дорога в тысячу миль // «Навигатор» от 20 апреля 2007. С. 35. O. Yurchenko, "Road of a Thousand Miles" (published in Navigator, April 20, 2007, p.35).
- Александрова Ю. Японский орден — российскому преподавателю // «Наука в Сибири», № 17 от 26 апреля 2007. С. 2. J. Aleksandrova, "Japanese Order for Russian Teacher" (published in Nauka v Sibiri, April 26, 2007, p.2).
- Дмитриева Н. Субботние встречи // «Вечерний Новосибирск» от 28 апреля 2007. С. 13. N. Dmitrieva, "Saturday Meetings" (published in Vechernij Novosibirsk, April 28, 2008, p. 13).
- Winners of the Spring State Awards in Japan (published in Tokio Shimbun, April 29, 2007, p. 25) – in Japanese.
- List of State Awards Winners (published in Tokio Shimbun, April 29, 2007, p. 30) – in Japanese.
- Лаврова А. Из истории нельзя вырывать страницы // «Твой городок» от 2 июля 2007. С. 2. A.Lavrova, "We Can not Forget our History" (published in Tvoi Gorodok, July 2, 1007, p. 2).
- Садыкова Е. Кавалер двух орденов // «Наука в Сибири», № 30-31 от 5 августа 2010 г. С. 5. E.Sadikova, "Holder of To Orders" (published in Nauka v Sibiri, August 5, 2010, №30-31, p.5).
