= Slava Frolova =

Ukrainian presenter (born 1976)

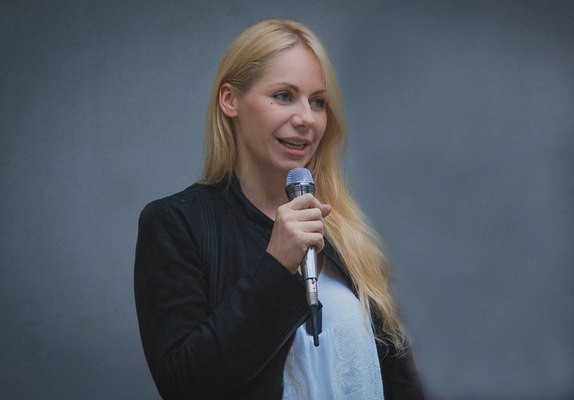
- Slava Frolova opens the exhibition of the Foundation, Odesa, 2013
- Born: Vyacheslava Vladyslavivna Frolova; June 9, 1976 (age 49); Odesa, Ukraine
- Occupations: TV Show presenter, Judge for Ukraine's Got Talent
- Known for: Ukraine's Got Talent

Vyacheslava Vladyslavivna Frolova (also known as Slava Frolova) (Ukrainian: Вячесла́ва Владисла́вівна Фроло́ва), is a Ukrainian TV Presenter, and is one of three judges for Ukraine's Got Talent.

== Biography ==
Frolova was born in 1976 in Odesa. Since childhood, she was fond of art, so she enrolled herself in the Yasha Hordiienko Fine Arts Studio at the Odesa Palace of Pioneers. Then she entered the K. K. Kostandi Children's Art School No. 1, where she became seriously interested in sculpture. She received her primary education at the secondary school-gymnasium No. 9. In 1992, Slava Frolova entered the Moscow State University of Fine Arts named after M. B. Grekov, Faculty of Sculpture.

== Personal life ==
Frolova is married and has two children; Mark (born in 2003) and Serafima (in 2011).
