= Ukraine in the Eurovision Song Contest 2017 =

- Eurovision Song Contest 2017
- Participating broadcaster: Public Broadcasting Company of Ukraine (UA:PBC)
- Country: Ukraine
- Selection process: Vidbir 2017
- Selection date: 25 February 2017

Competing entry
- Song: "Time"
- Artist: O.Torvald
- Songwriters: Yevhen Halych; Yevhen Kamenchuk

Placement
- Final result: 24th, 36 points

Participation chronology

Ukraine was represented at the Eurovision Song Contest 2017 with the song "Time", written by Yevhen Halych and Yevhen Kamenchuk, and performed by the band O.Torvald. The Ukrainian participating broadcaster, the Public Broadcasting Company of Ukraine (UA:PBC), organised a national final in collaboration with commercial broadcaster STB in order to select its entry for the contest. In addition, UA:PBC was also the host broadcaster and staged the event at the International Exhibition Centre in Kyiv, after its legal predecessor, the National Television Company of Ukraine (NTU), had won the previous edition with the song "1944" by Jamala.

The national selection consisted of three semi-finals, held on 4, 11 and 18 February 2017, and a final, held on 25 February 2017; eight entries competed in each semi-final with the top two from each semi-final advancing to the final. In the final, "Time" performed by O.Torvald was selected as the winner following the combination of votes from a three-member jury panel and a public televote.

As the host country, Ukraine qualified to compete directly in the final of the Eurovision Song Contest. Ukraine's running order position was determined by draw. Performing in position 22 during the final, Ukraine placed twenty-fourth out of the 26 participating countries with 36 points.

== Background ==
Prior to the 2017 contest,the National Television Company of Ukraine (NTU) had participated in the Eurovision Song Contest representing Ukraine thirteen times since its first entry in 2003, winning the contest in 2004 with the song "Wild Dances" performed by Ruslana and in 2016 with the song "1944" performed by Jamala. Following the introduction of semi-finals for the 2004 contest, Ukraine had managed to qualify to final in every contest they participated in thus far. Ukraine had been the runner-up in the contest on two occasions: in in 2007 with the song "Dancing Lasha Tumbai" performed by Verka Serduchka and in 2008 with the song "Shady Lady" performed by Ani Lorak. Ukraine's least successful result had been 19th place, achieved in 2005, with the song "Razom nas bahato" performed by GreenJolly.

After a restructuring that led to the incorporation of NTU into the current Public Broadcasting Company of Ukraine (UA:PBC) on 19 January 2017, it was the latter who participated in the 2017 contest. As part of its duties as participating broadcaster, UA:PBC organises the selection of its entry in the Eurovision Song Contest and broadcasts the event in the country. In the past, NTU had alternated between both internal selections and national finals in order to select its entry. Between 2011 and 2014, it had set up national finals with several artists to choose both the song and performer, with both the public and a panel of jury members involved in the selection. In September 2014, NTU announced that it would not participate in the 2015 contest because of the unstable financial and political situation caused by the war in east Ukraine. Along with the announcement of their withdrawal, NTU revealed that it had discussed the matter with the European Broadcasting Union (EBU), and that its absence would be limited to one year only with an expected return in 2016. In 2016, NTU in collaboration with the commercial broadcaster STB had set up a national final with several artists and shows to choose both the song and performer to compete at Eurovision, with both the public and a panel of jury members involved in the selection. UA:PBC continued to collaborate with STB in 2017.

== Before Eurovision ==
=== Vidbir 2017 ===
Vidbir 2017 was the second edition of Vidbir which selected the Ukrainian entry for the Eurovision Song Contest 2017. The competition took place at the Palace of Culture "KPI" in Kyiv and consisted of three semi-finals held on 4, 11 and 18 February 2017 and a final on 25 February 2017. All shows in the competition were hosted by Serhiy Prytula and broadcast on both UA:Pershyi and STB as well as online via UA:PBC's YouTube broadcasts.

==== Format ====
The selection of the competing entries for the national final and ultimately the Ukrainian Eurovision entry took place over three stages. In the first stage, artists and songwriters had the opportunity to apply for the competition either through an online submission form or by attending a scheduled audition during designated dates. Applicants also had the option of entering an online wildcard selection, the winner of which was to gain direct entry into the competition's final. However, it was later announced that the winner would compete in the competition's semi-finals instead. Twenty-four acts were selected and announced on 17 January 2017. The second stage consisted of the televised semi-finals which took place on 4, 11 and 18 February 2017 with eight acts competing in each show. Two acts were selected to advance from each semi-final based on the 50/50 combination of votes from a public televote and an expert jury. Both the public televote and the expert jury assigned scores ranging from 1 (lowest) to 8 (highest) and the two entries that had the highest number of points following the combination of these scores advanced to the final. The third stage was the final, which took place on 25 February 2017 and featured the six acts that qualified from the semi-finals vying to represent Ukraine in Kyiv. The winner was selected via the 50/50 combination of votes from a public televote and an expert jury. Both the public televote and the expert jury assigned scores ranging from 1 (lowest) to 6 (highest) and the entry that had the highest number of points following the combination of these scores was declared the winner. Viewers participating in the public televote during the four live shows had the opportunity to submit a single vote per phone number for each of the participating entries via SMS or the Teleportal mobile application. In the event of a tie during the semi-finals and final, the tie was decided in favour of the entry that received the highest score from the public televote.

The jury panel that voted during the four shows consisted of:

- Konstantin Meladze – Composer and producer
- Jamala – singer-songwriter, winner of the Eurovision Song Contest 2016 for Ukraine
- Andriy Danylko – comedian and singer, represented Ukraine in 2007 as the drag artist Verka Serduchka

==== Competing entries ====
Artists and composers had the opportunity to submit their entries via an online submission form which accepted entries between 1 September 2016 and 15 January 2017. Interested performers could also attend auditions that were held between 6 November and 11 December 2016 in the following cities and locations:

- 6 November 2016: Odesa (Hotel "Marenero")
- 13 November 2016: Dnipro (Hotel "Dnipropetrovsk")
- 4 December 2016: Lviv (Hotel "Reikartz")
- 11 December 2016: Kyiv (STB Headquarters)

In addition to the online submission and auditions, artists and composers also had the option of submitting their entries for the wildcard selection at STB's official website which accepted entries between 1 September 2016 and 10 January 2017. The entries were then published online and users were able to cast one vote per day. Composer and producer Konstantin Meladze was assigned as the music producer of the show and was the lead in reviewing the submissions received from the online submission and auditions, of which twenty-three entries were shortlisted to compete in the national final. On 17 January 2017, the twenty-four selected competing acts, including the online wildcard winner, "Deep Shivers" performed by Kuznetsov, were announced. The twenty-four acts were allocated to one of three semi-finals during a draw that took place on 20 January, which was hosted by Konstantin Meladze.

Top 10 of the wildcard round – 1 September 2016–10 January 2017
Artist	Song	Votes	Place
Kuznetsov	"Deep Shivers"	11,820	1
Denis Povaliy	"Written On Your Heart"	10,311	2
Katya Syvun	"Pryvyd" (Привід)	2,479	3
Legenda Folium	"My Space"	2,199	4
One Light Inside	"Stay"	1,920	5
Kseniya Popova	"Let it Fall"	1,919	6
Litvinkovich	"Nasha lyubov" (Наша любов)	1,375	7
Alex Angel and Lady Gala	"Running for Love"	1,296	8
Nataliya Pylyponyuk and Dzhoan Sereso	"Serenada Ukrayini" (Серенада Україні)	1,293	9
Oksana Pryimak	"Za krai" (За край)	1,077	10

Artist	Song	Songwriter(s)
Aghiazma	"Synthetic Sun"	Kora Rex, Aghiazma
Anastasia Prudius	"Flow"	Anastasia Prudius, Anton Karskiy
Arsen Mirzoyan	"Geraldine"	Arsen Mirzoyan, Paul Manandise
Detach	"Distance"	Oleksiy Verenchik, Evhen Astafiev
Green Grey	"Future Is On"	Green Grey
Illaria	"Thank You for My Way"	Ivan Rozin, Anna Rozina, Illaria
Kadnay	"Freedom in My Mind"	Dmytro Kadnay, Pylyp Kolyadenko, Anton Karskiy
Kuznetsov	"Deep Shivers"	Ruslan Kuznetsov
Laliko	"Sugar Whisper"	Lali Ergemlidze
Letay	"Svit chekaye" (Світ чекає)	Ilya Reznikov
MamaRika	"We Are One"	Anastasiya Kochetova, Ivan Klymenko, Very the Jerry
Mélovin	"Wonder"	Kostyantyn Bocharov, Mickey Mic
Mila Nytych	"Mystery"	Yulia Hashevskaya
Monochromea	"Blue Bird"	Kristina Hromyak
O.Torvald	"Time"	Yevhen Halych, Yevhen Kamenchuk
Panivalkova	"Dokuchayu" (Докучаю)	Panivalkova
Payushchie Trusy	"Singing Pants"	Volodymyr Bebeshko, Olga Stepura
Roma Veremeychik and Lumiere	"Make It Real"	Roman Veremeychik
Rozhden	"Saturn"	Panos Liassi, Rafael Ishman, Rozhden Anusi
Salto Nazad	"O, mamo!" (О, мамо!)	Ivan Klymenko
Skai	"All My Love for You"	Oleh Sobchuk, John Hill
Tayanna	"I Love You"	Max Barskih, Tetiana Reshetniak
Vitaly Kozlovsky	"I'm Your Light"	Dmytro Bananov, Maryna Skomorokhova
Vivienne Mort	"Iniy" (Іній)	Daniela Zayushkina

==== Shows ====
===== Semi-finals =====
The three semi-finals took place on 4, 11 and 18 February 2017. In each semi-final eight acts competed and the top two entries determined following the combination of votes from a public televote and an expert jury advanced to the final of the competition, while the remaining six entries were eliminated.

In addition to the performances of the competing entries, guests in the first semi-final included 2017 Belarusian Eurovision entrant Naviband performing the 2017 Belarusian entry "Historyja majho žyccia" and a Belarusian version of the Eurovision 2016 winning song "1944" by Jamala, and 2017 Georgian Eurovision entrant Tamara Gachechiladze performing the 2017 Georgian entry "Keep the Faith", while 2017 Spanish Eurovision entrant Manel Navarro performed the 2017 Spanish entry "Do It for Your Lover" as a guest in the second semi-final.

Semi-final 1 – 4 February 2017
R/O	Artist	Song	Jury	Televote		Total	Place
R/O	Artist	Song	Jury	Percentage	Points	Total	Place
1	Skai	"All My Love for You"	6	9.54%	5	11	4
2	Roman Veremeychik and Lumiere	"Make It Real"	2	6.30%	3	5	6
3	Monochromea	"Blue Bird"	3	4.35%	2	5	7
4	Laliko	"Sugar Whisper"	1	4.29%	1	2	8
5	Salto Nazad	"O, mamo!"	8	11.82%	6	14	2
6	MamaRika	"We Are One"	5	8.76%	4	9	5
7	Tayanna	"I Love You"	7	30.05%	8	15	1
8	Arsen Mirzoyan	"Geraldine"	4	24.90%	7	11	3

Semi-final 2 – 11 February 2017
R/O	Artist	Song	Jury	Televote		Total	Place
R/O	Artist	Song	Jury	Percentage	Points	Total	Place
1	Letay	"Svit chekaye"	1	5.76%	1	2	8
2	Mila Nytych	"Mystery"	3	7.66%	3	6	7
3	Kuznetsov	"Deep Shivers"	2	18.08%	7	9	5
4	Aghiazma	"Synthetic Sun"	5	7.66%	2	7	6
5	Detach	"Distance"	4	17.71%	6	10	3
6	Rozhden	"Saturn"	8	11.18%	5	13	2
7	Panivalkova	"Dokuchayu"	6	10.37%	4	10	4
8	Illaria	"Thank You for My Way"	7	21.59%	8	15	1

Semi-final 3 – 18 February 2017
R/O	Artist	Song	Jury	Televote		Total	Place
R/O	Artist	Song	Jury	Percentage	Points	Total	Place
1	Payushchie Trusy	"Singing Pants"	2	3.48%	1	3	8
2	O.Torvald	"Time"	7	19.70%	7	14	1
3	Anastasia Prudius	"Flow"	3	7.71%	3	6	6
4	Vitaly Kozlovsky	"I'm Your Light"	1	5.27%	2	3	7
5	Kadnay	"Freedom in My Mind"	8	14.50%	5	13	3
6	Mélovin	"Wonder"	5	23.84%	8	13	2
7	Green Grey	"Future Is On"	4	10.15%	4	8	5
8	Vivienne Mort	"Iniy"	6	15.36%	6	12	4

===== Final =====
The final took place on 25 February 2017. The six entries that qualified from the semi-finals competed. The winner, "Time" performed by O.Torvald, was selected through the combination of votes from a public televote and an expert jury. Ties were decided in favour of the entries that received higher scores from the public televote. 193,622 votes were registered by the televote during the show. In addition to the performances of the competing entries, guests included 2017 French Eurovision entrant Alma performing the 2017 French entry "Requiem" and 2017 Polish Eurovision entrant Kasia Moś performing the 2017 Polish entry "Flashlight". O.Torvald and Tayanna were tied at 10 points each at the end of the show but since O.Torvald received a higher score from the public they were declared the winners.

Final – 25 February 2017
R/O	Artist	Song	Jury	Televote		Total	Place
R/O	Artist	Song	Jury	Votes	Points	Total	Place
1	Salto Nazad	"O, mamo!"	1	21,978	3	4	6
2	Mélovin	"Wonder"	2	60,455	6	8	3
3	O.Torvald	"Time"	5	49,514	5	10	1
4	Illaria	"Thank You for My Way"	4	14,388	1	5	5
5	Tayanna	"I Love You"	6	32,319	4	10	2
6	Rozhden	"Saturn"	3	14,968	2	5	4

Detailed Jury Votes
R/O	Song	K. Meladze	Jamala	A. Danylko	Total	Points
1	"O, mamo!"	1	1	1	3	1
2	"Wonder"	3	2	6	11	2
3	"Time"	2	6	5	13	5
4	"Thank You for My Way"	4	4	4	12	4
5	"I Love You"	6	5	2	13	6
6	"Saturn"	5	3	3	11	3

=== Promotion ===
O.Torvald made several appearances across Europe to specifically promote "Time" as the Ukrainian Eurovision entry. On 2 April, O.Torvald performed during the London Eurovision Party, which was held at the Café de Paris venue in London and hosted by Nicki French and Paddy O'Connell. On 8 April, O.Torvald performed during the Eurovision in Concert event which was held at the Melkweg venue in Amsterdam, Netherlands and hosted by Cornald Maas and Selma Björnsdóttir.

== At Eurovision ==
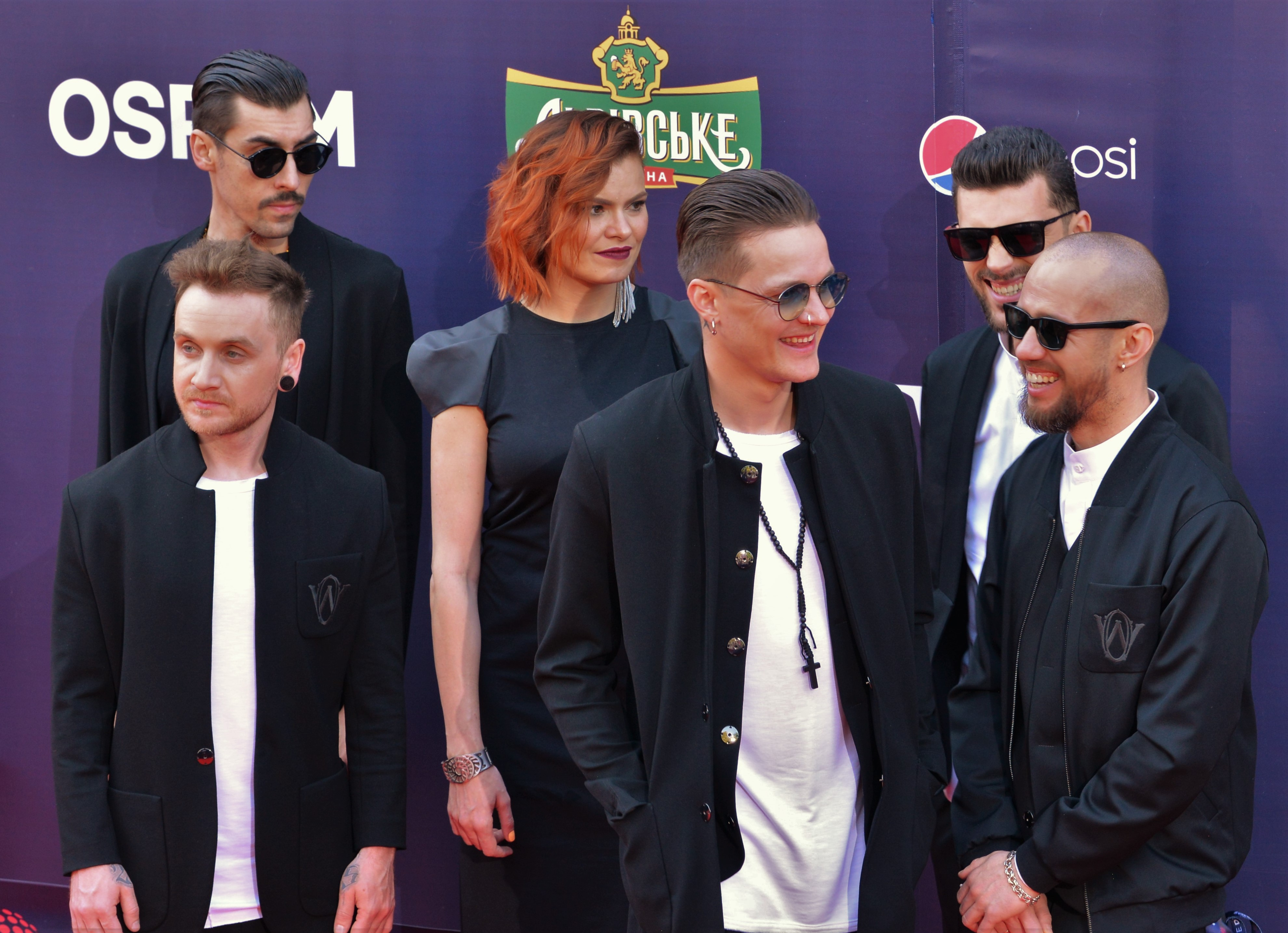
O.Torvald at the Eurovision Song Contest opening ceremony

All countries except the "Big Five" (France, Germany, Italy, Spain and the United Kingdom) and the host country, are required to qualify from one of two semi-finals in order to compete for the final; the top ten countries from each semi-final progress to the final. As the host country, Ukraine automatically qualified to compete in the final on 13 May 2017. In addition to their participation in the final, Ukraine is also required to broadcast and vote in one of the two semi-finals. During the semi-final allocation draw on 25 January 2016, Ukraine was assigned to broadcast and vote in the second semi-final on 11 May 2017.

In Ukraine, both the semi-finals and the final were broadcast on UA:Pershyi with commentary by Tetyana Terekhova and Andriy Horodyskyi. The three shows were also broadcast via radio on Radio Ukraine with commentary by Olena Zelinchenko and Roman Kolyada. The Ukrainian spokesperson, who announced the top 12-point score awarded by the Ukrainian jury during the final, was 2013 Ukrainian representative Zlata Ognevich.

=== Final ===
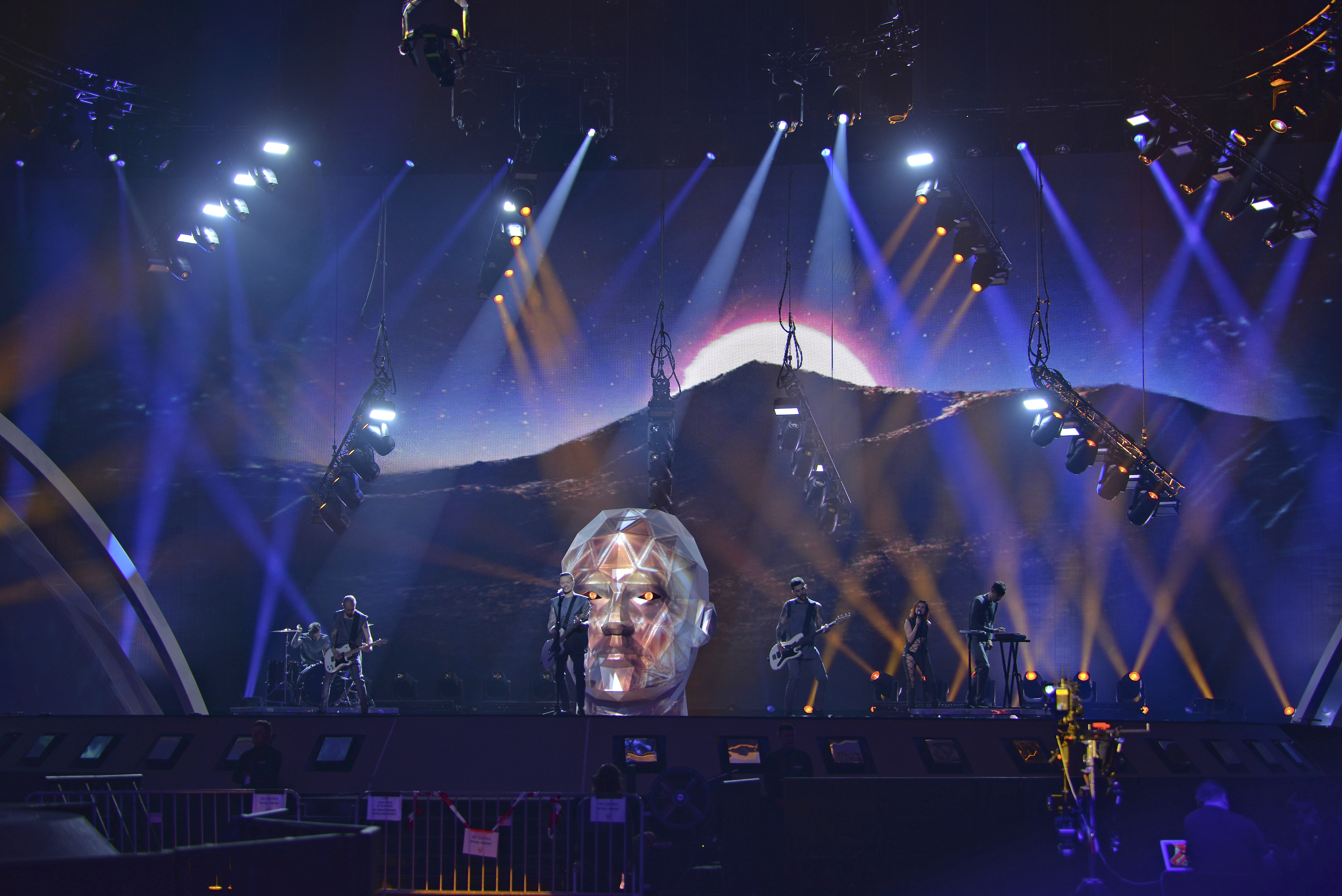
O.Torvald during a rehearsal before the final

O.Torvald took part in technical rehearsals on 5 and 7 May, followed by dress rehearsals on 10, 12 and 13 May. This included the semi-final jury show on 10 May where an extended clip of the Ukrainian performance was filmed for broadcast during the live show on 11 May and the jury final on 12 May where the professional juries of each country watched and voted on the competing entries. As the host nation, Ukraine's running order position in the final was decided through a random draw that took place during the Heads of Delegation meeting in Kyiv on 14 March 2017. Ukraine was drawn to perform in position 22. Following the second semi-final, the shows' producers decided upon the running order of the final rather than through another draw, so that similar songs were not placed next to each other. While Ukraine had already been drawn to perform in position 22, it was determined that Ukraine would perform following Germany and before the entry from Belgium.

The Ukrainian performance featured the members of O.Torvald performing on stage in a band set-up in black costumes together with a backing vocalist. The stage featured a head that transitioned from grey to blue colours, with its eyes lit up in light blue and changed to red towards the end of the performance. The LED screens displayed predominately turquoise colours that turned into black at points, accompanied by a mountainous imagery that extended upwards showing a sunrise before the conclusion of the song. The backing vocalist that joined O.Torvald on stage was Dasha Mineyeva. Ukraine placed twenty-fourth in the final, scoring 36 points: 24 points from the televoting and 12 points from the juries.

=== Voting ===
Voting during the three shows involved each country awarding two sets of points from 1-8, 10 and 12: one from their professional jury and the other from televoting. Each nation's jury consisted of five music industry professionals who are citizens of the country they represent, with their names published before the contest to ensure transparency. This jury judged each entry based on: vocal capacity; the stage performance; the song's composition and originality; and the overall impression by the act. In addition, no member of a national jury was permitted to be related in any way to any of the competing acts in such a way that they cannot vote impartially and independently. The individual rankings of each jury member as well as the nation's televoting results were released shortly after the grand final.

Below is a breakdown of points awarded to Ukraine and awarded by Ukraine in the second semi-final and grand final of the contest, and the breakdown of the jury voting and televoting conducted during the two shows:

==== Points awarded to Ukraine ====
Points awarded to Ukraine (Final)
Score	Televote	Jury
12 points		
10 points		
8 points		
7 points	Czech Republic; Italy	Azerbaijan
6 points		
5 points		
4 points	Georgia	Israel
3 points	Portugal	
2 points	Poland	
1 point	Belarus	Bulgaria

==== Points awarded by Ukraine ====
Points awarded by Ukraine (Semi-final 2)
Score	Televote	Jury
12 points	Belarus	Belarus
10 points	Bulgaria	Norway
8 points	Estonia	Bulgaria
7 points	Israel	Hungary
6 points	Hungary	Netherlands
5 points	Romania	Croatia
4 points	Norway	Romania
3 points	Croatia	Macedonia
2 points	Switzerland	Ireland
1 point	Lithuania	Israel

Points awarded by Ukraine (Final)
Score	Televote	Jury
12 points	Moldova	Belarus
10 points	Portugal	Portugal
8 points	Belarus	Hungary
7 points	Sweden	Croatia
6 points	France	Azerbaijan
5 points	Belgium	France
4 points	Hungary	Moldova
3 points	Romania	Netherlands
2 points	Bulgaria	Australia
1 point	Norway	Belgium

==== Detailed voting results ====
The following members comprised the Ukrainian jury:

- Yurii Rybchynsky (jury chairperson) – poet, dramatist, scriptwriter
- Sergii Grachov – composer, arranger
- Yana Pryadko – producer
- Sergii Gagarin (Serzh Gagarin) – radio presenter, producer
- Kateryna Sereda (Illaria) – singer, songwriter

Detailed voting results from Ukraine (Semi-final 2)
R/O	Country	Jury							Televote	
R/O	Country	Y. Rybchynsky	S. Grachov	Y. Pryadko	S. Gagarin	Illaria	Rank	Points	Rank	Points
01	Serbia	11	11	15	13	12	15		18	
02	Austria	12	12	9	17	11	14		12	
03	Macedonia	13	13	8	3	3	8	3	13	
04	Malta	14	14	5	7	16	12		17	
05	Romania	15	3	3	8	9	7	4	6	5
06	Netherlands	6	5	7	4	6	5	6	14	
07	Hungary	16	4	4	1	2	4	7	5	6
08	Denmark	17	15	12	10	7	13		15	
09	Ireland	3	6	14	9	10	9	2	11	
10	San Marino	18	16	18	18	18	18		16	
11	Croatia	1	2	11	6	8	6	5	8	3
12	Norway	5	9	1	5	4	2	10	7	4
13	Switzerland	7	8	13	14	14	11		9	2
14	Belarus	4	7	2	2	1	1	12	1	12
15	Bulgaria	2	1	6	11	5	3	8	2	10
16	Lithuania	8	18	17	15	17	17		10	1
17	Estonia	10	17	16	16	15	16		3	8
18	Israel	9	10	10	12	13	10	1	4	7

Detailed voting results from Ukraine (Final)
R/O	Country	Jury							Televote	
R/O	Country	Y. Rybchynsky	S. Grachov	Y. Pryadko	S. Gagarin	Illaria	Rank	Points	Rank	Points
01	Israel	23	18	18	17	19	20		17	
02	Poland	4	16	24	19	24	18		14	
03	Belarus	3	3	1	2	3	1	12	3	8
04	Austria	22	20	21	24	13	24		22	
05	Armenia	8	11	12	20	7	13		16	
06	Netherlands	9	4	14	11	9	8	3	23	
07	Moldova	2	1	16	5	20	7	4	1	12
08	Hungary	10	8	3	1	2	3	8	7	4
09	Italy	24	25	11	13	23	21		13	
10	Denmark	11	24	15	16	16	16		20	
11	Portugal	5	2	2	6	1	2	10	2	10
12	Azerbaijan	12	6	5	12	6	5	6	11	
13	Croatia	6	5	8	4	14	4	7	15	
14	Australia	13	13	10	10	4	9	2	19	
15	Greece	7	14	23	18	17	15		21	
16	Spain	18	23	25	25	22	25		25	
17	Norway	21	10	9	8	10	12		10	1
18	United Kingdom	14	19	20	14	15	17		18	
19	Cyprus	16	12	19	21	21	19		12	
20	Romania	17	9	4	15	11	11		8	3
21	Germany	15	22	22	22	18	23		24	
22	Ukraine									
23	Belgium	19	21	6	3	5	10	1	6	5
24	Sweden	20	15	13	7	12	14		4	7
25	Bulgaria	25	7	17	23	25	22		9	2
26	France	1	17	7	9	8	6	5	5	6
