= Kyiv Day and Night =

Ukrainian reality television series

- Poster featuring season 1 cast
- Київ вдень та вночі
- Genre: Romance; Comedy; Reality television; Soap opera
- Based on: Berlin – Tag & Nacht
- Directed by: Kseniia Buhrimova (season 1–4); Inna Melnyk (season 5)
- Starring: Oksana Avram; Bohdan Sheludiak; Karina Havryliuk; Albina Pererva; Oleksandr Ozolin; Pavlo Serhiienko; Epifanio López; Yaroslava Zhytomirska; Alina London; Anastasiia Durkot; Maksym Sosnovskyi; Semen Tereshchenko; Nazar Kukharenko; Polina Kovalevska
- Narrated by: Kostiantyn Voitenko
- Opening theme: "Киев днем и ночью" by O.Torvald
- Country of origin: Ukraine
- Original languages: Russian (season 1–3); Ukrainian (season 4-5)
- No. of seasons: 5
- No. of episodes: 264 (list of episodes)

Production
- Production locations: Kyiv, Ukraine
- Camera setup: Single-camera
- Running time: 33–72 minutes (Note: Produced videos are estimated between minimum 33 and maximum 72 timespan in YouTube channel.)

Original release
- Network: Novyi Kanal
- Release: March 8, 2016 – January 8, 2019

Kyiv Day and Night (Ukrainian: Київ вдень та вночі, Kyyiv vdenʹ ta vnochi) is a Ukrainian reality television series based on the 2011 German series Berlin – Tag & Nacht. From season 1 to 4, the series stars were Oksana Avram, Bohdan Sheludiak, Karina Havryliuk, Oleksandr Ozolin and Albina Pererva – the former four except Pererva were dismissed in 2017. The show was rebooted on August 28, 2018, for its fifth season. In 2018, the show reprised with new storyline and cast including Alina London, Anastasiia Durkot, Maksym Sosnovskyi, Yaroslava Zhytomirska, Semen Tereshchenko, and Polina Kovalevska. In addition, Albina Pererva, Oleksandr Voronyi (as Oleksandr Volodymyrovych), Pavlo Serhiienko and Nazar Kukharenko took on the same role as with past seasons. It was filmed in Kyiv and broadcast on Novyi Kanal from March 8, 2016, to January 8, 2019.

Narrated by Kostiantyn Voitenko, Kyiv Day and Night story revolves around a group of young people rent a shared apartment in Kyiv's center. Those people find themselves in an unstable love triangle, jealousy and machinations. The story arc outlines various forms of relationship problems, arising from cheating to trustworthy companionship. In the fall of 2018, Novyi Kanal announced to halt the show and discontinued the season story in 2019. The show was produced with bilingual versions; season 1–4 with Russian language and season 5 with Ukrainian.

Overall, the show attracted negative reception due to its primary focus on sexually mature content. In contrast, few critics praised the series for their depiction of amateur actors and describing it "friendly show". The director of the four seasons Kseniia Buhrimova expressed her approval stating "Our heroes are not stars, they are the guys from the next doorway, who prove: no matter what trouble happens to you, you are not alone. There is always someone who can help and support. They have become onscreen friends for millions of viewers." According to the channel's head of press service, Svitlana Tsybanova said they were working to broadcast 7 I Roses on behalf of a similar reality television series.

== Development ==
=== Setting, production and premise ===
Kyiv Day and Night is set in the Ukrainian capital Kyiv. Inspired by its adaptation Berlin — Tag & Nacht, production took place in an apartment on the 24th floor— a top floor and penthouse of apartment. It was secondarily inspired by a Russian TV show Dom-2. As scripted reality show, Kyiv Day and Night includes elements of mise en scène interviews, with most actors using their real name.

The filming production began in August 2015.

I think our viewers felt that the stories of the guys came to a logical end. There were a lot of comments: they say, what else? Well, what else could happen to these guys? We love all our heroes who have been with us all these four seasons. They managed to become related and become a family, to feel like parents of the guys. But, probably, in all families there comes a period when children need to be released into free swimming, so that they become better, reach new heights in their lives. The guys grew up and clearly understood what they want from life. And I really hope that at least a tiny percentage of this is the merit of Kyiv Day and Night.

— Inna Melnyk commenting about the series

=== Soundtracks ===
Soundtrack production for Kyiv Day and Night began before its release around 2015. Some tracks were independently taken from several Ukrainian artists, such as Bahroma, Onuka, and O.Torvald. Karina Havryliuk and Oleksandr Ozolin, who were part of the cast, also contributed to the soundtrack. Their singles "Мой мир" (My World) and "S.M.I.L.A" gained widespread attention in Ukraine.

==== O.Torvald ====
"Киев Днем и Ночью"

Single by O.Torvald
- Language: Russian
- Released: February 14, 2016
- Recorded: 2015–2016
- Genre: Punk rock
- Length: 4:17
- Songwriters: Denys Myzyuk; Yevhen Halych

O.Torvald singles chronology
"Крик" (2014)	"Киев Днем и Ночью" (2016)	"Вирвана" (2016)

Kyiv Day and Night soundtrack chronology
Киев Днем и Ночью (2016)	Мой мир (2016)

The series' main theme "Киев Днем и Ночью" was performed by Ukrainian band O.Torvald and premiered as their single on February 14, 2016. The song was written by band members Yevhen Halych and Denys Myzyuk. Inspired by punk rock, the music video was released on May 4, 2016, and depicts the band singing in a film studio. The band frontman Yevhen kisses a girl (portrayed by Taisiia-Oksana Shchuruk) inside the car and exits. In the middle of video, scenes from the first episode shown. At the last bridge, the cast members assemble with the band and cheeringly dance, while accessing musical instruments. In the last scene, the camera then unfolds the first scene of Yevhen kiss the girl and he observes Sasha's raccoon moving beneath the car and blinks his eyes.

==== Karina Havryliuk ====
"Мой мир"

Single by Karina Havryliuk
- Language: Russian
- Released: December 5, 2016
- Genre: Eurodance
- Length: 2:31

Kyiv Day and Night soundtrack chronology
Киев Днем и Ночью (2016)	Мой мир (2016)	S.M.I.L.A (2017)

Karina Havryliuk covered another track called "Мой мир" (My World) on December 5, 2016. "Мой мир" hook is reminiscent to Eurythmics' 1983 song "Sweet Dreams (Are Made of This)". In the lyrics, Karina expresses her empowerment among her friends, exploration to the world, and self-esteem in her life. It also empowered with liberty, arrogance, excessively proud contempt towards her friends as described in the first verse: "I don't need your caresses, I know for sure there is no love. In this city people generally do not get offended, and people seize upon opportunities that are made available to them. To Belle's friend I am for myself, luxurious style is my destiny".

The music video was released on March 27, 2017, through a channel account. In the music video, Karina appears semi-nude to pose photography in studio. The video also shows a house party in the apartment while all her friends presented. When she shouts, the party-goers pauses, and she begins roaming and destroying objects including breaking wine glass, spilling water to Bohdan's face and wearing a cone to Oksana's head. In the final scene, she is shown shedding eye shadow tears at the party and leaving the studio. The song also marks Karina's appearance in the series.

==== Oleksandr Ozolin ====
"S.M.I.L.A"

Single by Oleksandr Ozolin
- Language: Russian
- Released: September 12, 2017
- Genre: Hip hop; trap
- Length: 2:27

Kyiv Day and Night soundtrack chronology
Мой мир (2016)	S.M.I.L.A (2017)

The last track, titled "S.M.I.L.A", was covered by Oleksandr Ozolin and released on September 12, 2017, through the channel. It is loosely inspired by the town Smila, in Cherkasy Oblast.

Oleksandr posted to social network for assistance in songwriting. He got his lyrics from a physics teacher Oleh Mykhailovych, near the city. Oleksandr described that event: "When I read the letter, I immediately realized: this is it! I have loved hip-hop since childhood and the music written by our friend, the soloist of the band Cardiomashine Max Lysenko. In general, the song came out in my style. Which, I hope, will appreciate the young people."

The music video features Oleksandr with Albina Pererva and her on-screen husband Oleksandr Volodymyrovych. The trio then wander in different locations, including in basketball pitch, public places and roads. The video shows a group of youth. In the last scene, Oleksandr signals his friends by whistling and stands on the road as their bus is stationed behind them. The song also marks Oleksandr's appearance in the series.

=== Other tracks ===
These tracks were performed by various artists.

- BAHROMA – "На глубине" (2015)
- BAHROMA – "Пока-Пора" (2014)
- Иван Дорн – "Тем более" (2012)
- Иван Дорн – "Ненавижу" (2012)
- С.К.А.Й. – "Струна" (2012)
- Ева Бушмина – "Собой" (2013)
- Pianoboy – "Все врут" (2015)
- LOBODA – "Не нужна" (2014)
- Bahroma – "На семи холмах" (2014)
- Max Barskih – "Подруга-ночь" (2016)
- Max Barskih – "Займемся любовью" (2016)
- Druha Rika – "Три Хвилини" (2008)
- Monatik – "Важно" (2012)
- ONUKA – "Misto" (2015)
- ONUKA – "TIME" (2014)
- 5 Vymir – "Malo Sliv" (2015)
- Jamala – "Я Люблю Тебя" (2012)
- ONUKA – "Vidlik" (2016)
- Супермодель по-украински feat MONATIK – "Улыбаясь" (2016)
- Ivan Dorn – "Где вино" (2014)
- Para Normalnykh – "Не улетай" (2009)
- Арсен Мірзоян – "Можеш як" (2014)
- KBDM – "Иду на свет" (2013)
- O.Torvald – "Все Це Знов" (2016)
- ЖИВЯКОМ – "Музыка улиц" (2014)
- Андрей Леницкий – "Дышу тобой" (2015)

Track listing
No.	Title	Length
1.	"Киев Днем и Ночью"	4:17
2.	"Мой мир"	2:31
3.	"S.M.I.L.A"	2:57
4.	"На глубине"	4:50
5.	"Пока-Пора"	5:58
6.	"Революция"	3:40
7.	"Тем более"	2:48
8.	"Ненавижу"	3:48
9.	"Струна"	3:31
10.	"Собой"	3:43
11.	"Все врут"	3:56
12.	"Не нужна"	3:30
13.	"На семи холмах"	3:53
14.	"Люди"	4:55
16.	"Подруга-ночь"	3:51
17.	"Займемся любовью"	3:47
18.	"Три Хвилини"	3:51
19.	"Важно"	4:10
20.	"Misto"	5:24
21.	"TIME"	5:48
22.	"Malo Sliv"	4:09
23.	"Я люблю тебя"	2:48
24.	"Vidlik"	3:21
25.	"Супермодель по-украински"	1:38
26.	"Где вино"	3:30
27.	"Можеш як"	4:11
28.	"Иду на свет"	4:03
29.	"Все це знов"	4:25
30.	"Музыка улиц"	4:41
31.	"Дышу тобой"	3:25

=== Block programming ===
Although varied by season, all block programs usually aired in all days, initially at 9:00 EET. Starting from season 5 episode 65 (the last broadcasting week before cancellation), the broadcasting time shifted to prime time at 21:00. The series gained license to StarLightMedia.

== Plot ==
=== Season 1–4 ===
==== Main ====
A group of four young friends — Karina, Albina, Bohdan and Sasha (Oleksandr) — rent an apartment on the twenty-fourth floor of a building. The story dynamic changes when Oksana, a young girl from Lviv, arrives in Kyiv under Bohdan's arrangement via phone call. Unfortunately, Oksana's suitcase has been stolen by a passerby while travelling to the apartment. The luggage contains Oksana's important items, including her outfits and cash. Oksana meets with Sasha and Albina, while Karina doubts she is to be Bohdan's new girlfriend. The group decide a vote to select whether Oksana stay at the apartment or expel from their room. That night, the group go to club to celebrate Karina's birthday. Heavy intoxicated, Oksana sleeps with Bohdan in his bedroom. Upon Karina finding out their relationship, she is more leaned hostile toward Oksana interest and attempts frequent manipulations to thwart their end. Meanwhile, Bohdan brutally betrayed her, begins affair with other women. His on and off unreliable relations deteriorated from time and distance Oksana, making more complicated in her life.

Aside from finding job in cookery, Oksana is challenged by Karina's manipulations, temptation and Bohdan's selfish interest. Oksana's self-reliance dwindled and endangers her job opportunity, being frequently warned and fired by her boss. One day, an anonymous suitor approaches Oksana at her workplace with bouquet of flowers. Albeit she didn't clearly know beforehand, he claims he recognize earlier and developed romantic relationship. Oksana is more abused and coerced by him at club, from this point, Pasha (Pavlo) appears and saves her. Pasha and Oksana get romantically involved and assists her to get a new job, an assistance pastry chief, which she like very much.

Over time, she falls in love with Bohdan again and Pasha becomes more furious when he see their friendship. In season 3, Oksana becomes pregnant with Bohdan and gives a birth. As the child begin growing, Bohdan promised to protect the child as primary responsibility, albeit does not care about Oksana. Also, the introduction of Epifanio, a Latino playboy to the group alter the storyline; he quickly engaged with Karina to forget her confrontation with Oksana. Epifanio often feuds with both Bohdan and Pasha to win Oksana back without realizing Oksana's denial.

However, Bohdan secretly involved to a mysterious girl named Nastia (Anastasiia) in season 4, who escaped from her bridegroom from a wedding. Pasha introduces Olezhka (Oleh), a flamboyant makeup artist, to Karina at a nightclub. With the help Olezhka, Pasha developed feeling toward Karina, and the two become romantically engaged.

Fortunately, Sasha develops romance toward Oksana and attempts to ask his feeling. In latter part, Bohdan and Nastia separated while Nastia stressed to take care of her mentally disabled sister Alina. In the meantime, Bohdan attempts unsuccessful approach toward Oksana. In case of her sister deteriorating mental illness, Nastia move out Kyiv to start a new life.

At one night, the friends returned apartment after organizing party at club. Bohdan, under intoxicated state, reveals his affection toward Oksana and kisses her in surprise; Sasha witnesses and leave. Shocked by the event, Oksana tells the kissing to Sasha as mistake and pledges to forgive her. Bohdan successfully convince him that that kiss is by mistake and ask an apology. Near the ending episodes, Oksana is seen prepared for wedding with Sasha, Karina apologized for past actions against Oksana and reconciled and reunited with Bohdan. The story concludes with the double wedding of Oksana and Sasha to Albina and Oleksandr.

==== Minor ====
===== Viktor's family =====
Viktor is a landowner of the apartment. He is struggling domestic issues and usually conflicts with his daughter Taisiya and his wife Masha. Taisiya always defiant toward her parents and drug addict. This behavior is influencd by the separation of her family and school performance, as both Viktor and Masha establish their own life. Both are infidel and not trust each other.

===== Andrii's family =====
Andrii's family include Yana, Rita and Khrystyna. When he arrived in Kyiv, Andrii is greeted by his wife and Rita is not pleasant for his presence. Yana is strictive to her youngest daughter while Rita stand by her. In Season 4, Andrii offers passport to the siblings in order to live outside the country.

===== Life of Artur =====
Artur is a minor character appearing starting from the first season. He is betrayed by different kind of women and eventually he forge a strong relationship with Diana. In season 4, he and Diana engaged.

===== Nastia and Alina =====
Nastia is a girl appeared in season 4 as bride who escapes husband-to-be from wedding ceremony. Nastia has relations with Bohdan, Epifanio and Artur. She is suffered from stress when her sister Alina become mentally unstable. In later episode, while Alina incarcerated at psychiatric hospital, Nastia move out Kyiv to begin new life.

=== Season 5 ===
On August 28, 2018, a reboot of the series was premiered, altering the cast members and linear storyline. Albina Pererva, Oleksandr Volodymyrovych, Pavlo Serhiienko and Nazar Kukharenko (season 4) recur their role in this season. Model Maksym "Fizruk" Sosnovskyi has been nominated by audience as "Top Model of Ukraine" for his role in the series. Similar to the previous seasons, the season is affixed in a story arc.

The plot revolves around a group of five people, finding themselves in an unpredictable mess due to romantic, financial and friendship problems. Alina, Sam, Nastia, Yaroslava reside in the apartment as Albina and Oleksandr recur their residency from the season. The fate of a story obviously tragedy at the later episode, almost all friendly characters sadly break up.

Businessman Nazar is introduced to Alina and they begin a romantic relation. Despite being on again, off again, they face difficulties in their relationships. Both are hindered by business ventures, and Nazar's romantic connection to Polina. Alina's behavior exhibits betrayal of men, prostitution in exchange of money. In the last episode, she leaves him with a note slipped inside a bag that notifies her decision to start a new life.

In the middle episode, Polina become dated to Pasha, without knowing her connection with Nazar, who has been his client. When Pasha find a new girlfriend near the end of episode, Nazar demonize him to his girlfriend, and make arrest him in the final episode.

Sam begins a relationship with Yaroslava. Yaroslava desires Sam to start a new job, with goals for a better life. However he becomes romantically involved with Alina which leads their relation to be terminated. He becomes a drummer of band after serious breakthrough. During the middle of the episode, a girl named Yuliia joins the group, becoming his girlfriend. However, this is frustrated by her close friend, in which she secretly taking him in the last episode.

The relationship of Max (Maksym) and Nastia seems silly, childish and good. However they ignore their mutual ideas, and interests routinely. Max participates in a dancing show, Nastia often doing in household, such as sewing clothes. In the last episode, Max resents Nastia as a result of her ignorance and she is dating a new boyfriend called Ruslan. He left video recording that describes his last resort to live his friends. Before that, he entrapped Ruslan into prostitute where he called Nastia to see them. Nastia then extremely upset by Ruslan and leaves him. She finds Max while he is about leaving the room, but is ignorant, ultimately Max proceeds to leave his friends.

The life of husband-and-wife Oleksandr and Albina in this season is complicated after Oleksandr opens a detective room. Oleksandr hires a secretaryess to his room, but unfortunately she win him over, and frustrate their relationship. However, they become reconciled and left their home at the final scene.

== Series overview ==
Season	Episodes	Originally aired	
Season	Episodes	First aired	Last aired
1	48	March 8, 2016	May 27, 2016
2	60	September 13, 2016	December 23, 2016
3	36	April 4, 2017	June 2, 2017
4	48	September 19, 2017	December 8, 2017
5	72	August 28, 2018	January 8, 2019

== Cast and characters ==
=== Main ===
Alternative poster for season 1 cast during its production.

==== Season 1–4 ====
- Oksana Avram as herself – a girl from Lviv. After residing in Kyiv and joining all four roommates, she works in cake decorating. She opens an ice cream parlor with Albina and is successful in this job. In season 3, Karina deliberately sets fire to this parlor, making Oksana thwart to her life. In season 4, she is seen working with Andrii's pub which is also run by Pasha and Epifanio jointly. Her persona is kind and gentle and this makes her beloved even if Karina dislikes due to her preoccupation with Bohdan. She is betrayed by Pasha, who has an affair with other women in their marriage, raising the chances of her divorcing him. She falls in love with Sasha in season 4 and marries simultaneously with the wedding of Albina and Oleksandr.
- Bohdan Sheludiak as himself – a photographer from a small town. He first falls in love with Oksana and gives birth to a baby. However he disregards Oksana and starts covert relationships with women including Vika, Liliia, Karina and ultimately Nastia. He eventually becomes single. Bohdan's performance has heavily criticized for his extreme sexually promiscuous and annoying languid behavior.
- Karina Havryliuk as herself – a singer from Khmelnytskyi. A sole antagonist of Oksana and others because of Bohdan and his relationship with Oksana. Karina is described as an "arrogant woman" who seek revenge to her whole friends. She eventually fall in love with Pasha.
- Albina Pererva as herself – a girl from the Sumy region. An overweight woman, she is always concerned about her body, measuring her weight on a daily basis, while her eating disorder has persisted since a young age. She is a close friend and acquaintance of Oksana since the beginning of the series. She falls in love with Oleksandr (in season 3) and marries him (season 4) along with Oksana and Sasha's wedding. In mid-episode of season 5, their relationship become hindered when he hired a new assistant female secretary to his detective room. They eventually reconciled, and left their home later.
- Oleksandr Ozolin as Sasha – a perfect breakdancer from Kyiv. Sasha is also trained with street graffiti and also seldom enjoys drawing in their room's wall. He has a pet raccoon which is becomes companion over time until he passes it on to a zoo in season 3; though it appeared at the last episode of season 4. Sasha's persona reflects joyous and well-being. In season 4, he falls in love with Oksana and they get married with the wedding of Albina and Oleksandr. In the mid-episode of season 5, Sasha reappears as an intrusive guest in the apartment who want to repaint graffiti of his room wall.
- Pavlo Serhiienko as Pasha – a mechanic and later manager of pub owned by Andrii, a father of Rita and husband of Yana. He fall in love with Oksana in the first season and they married. Pasha betrays Oksana, having affairs with other women, which leads her to divorce him. When Olezhka debuts in season 4, Pasha is reintroduced to Karina, and they fall in love with one another. Olezhka, Karina and Pasha buy a house and start a new life. In season 4, Pasha also complains to Andrii about his duty in his pub while Epifanio is obsessed with a variety of tasks and does not share the profits with him. In season 5, Pasha engaged with Polina, but entangled with Nazar. When dating his new girlfriend, Nazar demonize him to his girlfriend and make arrest him at the final episode.
- Oleksandr Volodymyrovych as himself – a police detective and Albina's husband. They get married with Oksana and Sasha's wedding. He referred to as "Sasha" in season 5. In mid-episode of this season, their relationship become hindered when he hired a new assistant female secretary to his detective room. They eventually reconciled, and left their home later.
- Epifanio López as himself – a model debuted in season 3, as Karina's boyfriend. Thereafter, their relationship is filled with vengefulness. He is obsessed by Oksana, while preventing Pasha and Bohdan to let them win back. In season 4, he is betrayed and stabbed by Nastia's sister during their engagement. Alina forcibly transferred to a mental asylum. He also get in dispute to Pasha in case of Andrii's pub leadership.

==== Season 5 ====
Season 5 cast in 2018.

- Anastasiia Durkot as Nastia – a waitress who substitutes in the season 4 Nastia, a bride who escaped the wedding and intercepts to the group's share taxi belonging to Oksana, Sasha and Bohdan, joining the group. Nastia wants to get into university but prefers to continue in her job in a hotel. In the middle of the episode, Max is attracted to her and tries to reveal his feelings as she ignored him. The two, less conflicted by personal interest, are soon reconciled. She abandons him and dates with her new boyfriend called Ruslan. In the last episode, Max entrapped Ruslan into a prostitute and informed Nastia to see them. Nastia is extremely upset by Ruslan and leaves him. When Max is about to leave his friends, she ignored him and separated.
- Maksym Sosnovskyi as Max – a model from Mohyliv-Podilskyi. He was initially engaged to Nastia. The two, less conflicted by personal interest, are soon reconciled. In the final episode, he is seen recording video footage that reveals his hopelessness and inconvenient with life and decision to leave his friends. She abandons him and dates with her new boyfriend called Ruslan. In the last episode, Max entrapped Ruslan into a prostitute and informed Nastia to see them. Nastia is extremely upset by Ruslan and leaves him. When Max is about to leave his friends, she ignored him and separated.
- Alina London as herself – a girl who substitutes in season 4 for Alina, a sister of Nastia. Alina meets with Nazar in a nightclub and becomes romantically engaged since the beginning of the season. Nazar and Alina's relationship is considered unsubstantial and experience infidelity from both sides. At the final episode, Alina seriously leaves Nazar with a note slipped inside a bag notifying her decision to go out of friends.
- Nazar Kukharenko as himself – a businessman from Mykolaiv. He initially debuts in season 4 having a role of Andrii's client and Rita's love interest. In season 5, he plays as Alina's boyfriend but she leaves him in the last episode with a note slipped in the table. Nazar and Alina's relationship is considered unsubstantial and experience infidelity from both sides. At the final episode, Alina seriously leaves Nazar with a note slipped inside a bag notifying her decision to go out of friends.
- Polina Kovalevska as herself – a girl from Kyiv who works in her parents' restaurant as development director. In the middle episode, she becomes engaged with Pasha. With intervention of Alina, she secretly had a continuous relationship with Nazar, but she left him later.
- Semen Tereshchenko as Sam – a professional drummer from Mykolaiv. He is seen job hunting after series dismissal of subsequent jobs, then he finds a street performing band and successfully joins them as a drummer. Sam begins a romantic relation to Yaroslava, but the two were separated due to Alina. In mid episode, a girl named Yuliia introduced the group as a love interest of Sam. This relationship frustrated by her close friend and secretly had affair with him.
- Yaroslava Zhytomirska as herself – a girl who fall in love with Sam. Sam and Yaroslava relationship didn't survive in the later due to Alina. Not only Alina, she also jealous towards Yuliia preoccupation with Sam. She desires Sam to seek a job and struggle with his life, in order to gain benefit for both.

=== Supporting ===
- Taisiia-Oksana Shchuruk as herself
- Artur Lohai as himself
- Viktoriia Maremukha as Vika
- Anastasiia Kotliar as Nastia
- Oleh Mashukovskyi as Olezhka
- Marharyta Avramenko as Rita
- Viktor Andrushchenko as himself
- Hennadii Malakhov as himself
- Andrii Borysovych as himself
- Mariia Yakymenko as Masha
- Yana Smolentseva as herself
- Yuliia Fedorets as herself

== Reception ==
The second season saw an increase in viewing figures by 25%. As the season five premiered on August 28, 2018, the total rating critically declined by 50%. Novyi Kanal staff discussed the problem, as well as the amount of Ukrainian viewers and comments. Many critics disapproved the series due to the presence of sexually violated scenes, nudity and presenting sex and drugs themes. In contrast, the series gained favorable viewers who described it "friendly show". In disotzov, it has gained viewer attraction while some concerned with complicated plot. They have expressed disappointment over interchanging original actors with new actors in the season 5.

Websites like Otzovik, the series aggregated 80%. Irecommend gave 5 stars while gaining 6 votes. Meanwhile, OTZYVUA gave only 1.4 stars, which is the lowest aggregate recorded.

== Awards and nominations ==
Year	Award	Category	Nominee	Result	Ref.
2018	Teletriumph	Docudrama, scripted reality		Nominated	
