= Moon Records Ukraine =

Ukrainian record label

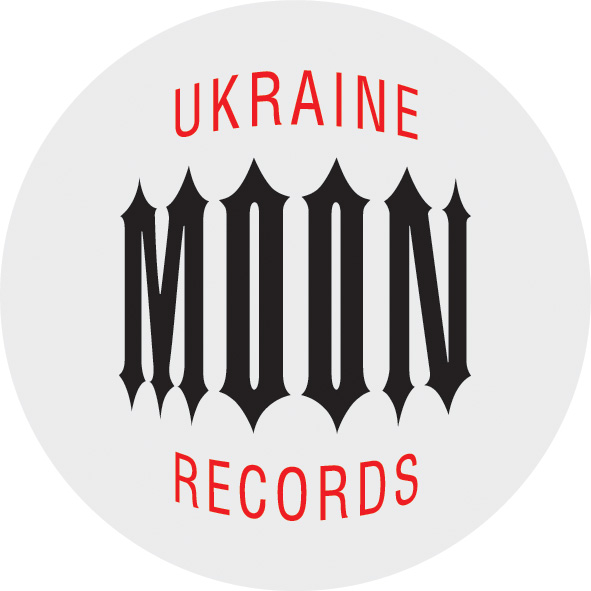
- Founded: 1997
- Founder: Andriy Pasichnyk
- Genre: Various
- Country of origin: Ukraine
- Official website: moon.ua

Moon Records Ukraine is a Ukrainian record label formed in 1997 and based in Kyiv, Ukraine. The label specializes in producing the music of Ukrainian and Russian musical artists and is currently the largest music publisher in Ukraine.

== Catalogue ==
The distributor directory of the company has more than five thousand albums. It includes albums and discographies of such performers as: Skryabin, REAL1ST, Dan Balan, Timur Rodriguez, Seryoga, The VYO, AQUA VITA, Arsen Mirzoyan, Tonya Matvienko, Hot Chocolate (in cooperation with Dmytro Klimashenko) based on the producer's DK & MOON production center) Natalia Valevskaya, Green Grey, Stoned Jesus, SINOPTIK, LATEXFAUNA, Lumiere, PATSYKI Z FRANEKA, Numer 482, TARABAROVA, Ivan Dorn, Dasha Suvorova, daKooka, Cape Cod, Pianoboy, Vivienne Mort, O.Torvald, Robots Do not Cry, Kishe, Dmytro Kolyadenko, Serhiy Kuzin, Sonya Sotnik, TIK, Dilya, Victor Pavlik, Olya Polyakova, Maria Burmaka, Anastasia Prikhodko, Vitaly Kozlovsky, Lavka, Go_A, and others.

== History ==
Moon Records was founded by Andrei Pasichnyk in 1997. In its early years, Moon Records specialized in the production of alternative and non-format music, including a wide variety of styles, from gangsta rap to heavy metal.

Since mid-2002, Moon Records has acquired the status of the official representative in Ukraine of the Mystery of Sound music company. The company's partners include Gala Records, the Mystery of Sound, Universal Music, UNION (concern), CD Land, Monolith, Quad Disk, Irond Records, 100PRO and other companies.

Moon Records has open offices in Germany and Russia. The company also has a division in the Czech Republic, the company MOON VINYL.

The label is one of the largest and oldest in Ukraine.

== Main fields of activities ==
- placement of media content on the Internet (more than 250 platforms)
- promotional and PR support, placing music content on TV and radio broadcasts, working with mobile operators, sending and posting information about releases in print and online media, publishing news from the artist’s life on the company's social networks, as well as on the official company website
- a division of MOON PUBLISHING, copyright management
- wholesale of CD, DVD, VINYL / LP products
- retail trade in company mechanical carriers and a digital media content in the section MOON Store
- placement and monetization of music video-audio content on legal sites (we are the official partner of YouTube)
- control and collection of remuneration for public performance, broadcast of works and phonograms
- distribution of mobile content through cooperation with major mobile operators

== Awards ==
- In 2011, the company received the Golden Pen award for its significant contribution to the development of domestic show business.
- In 2017, Moon Records was awarded the Silver Button YouTube
