= Early Swallows =

Ukrainian teen drama television series

- Перші ластівки (in Ukrainian)
- Genre: Teen drama
- Created by: Yevhen Tunik
- Directed by: Valentyn Shpakov
- Starring: Viktoriia Lytvynenko; Polina Nosykhina; Maksym Samchyk; Taisiia-Oksana Shchuruk; Oleksandr Rudynskyi; Mariia Smoliakova; Olesia Zhurakivska; Daryna Trehubova; Nina Naboka
- Theme music composer: DaKooka
- Opening theme: Люби меня
- Ending theme: Герой
- Composer: DaKooka
- Country of origin: Ukraine
- Original language: Ukrainian
- No. of series: 2
- No. of episodes: 16

Production
- Producer: Yevhen Tunik
- Running time: 40 minutes

Original release
- Network: Novyi Kanal
- Release: November 19, 2019 – present

Early Birds (Ukrainian: Перші ластівки (Note: stylized as Перші ʌастіvки), Pershi lastivky (Note: The series title is a reference to the belief that swallows are the first sign of spring.)) is a Ukrainian teen drama television series. The series' storylines involve bullying, online harassment, sexual identity and suicide. The first episode aired in November 2019. Broadcast by Novyi Kanal, the televised episodes attract a viewership of six million viewers on live-to-air television and millions more viewers online. The teen drama was responsible for a 600% increase in calls to a mental health helpline. Because of its rare and graphic content compared to other Ukrainian television series, the series has been described by BBC News as "a local surprise hit". It has also been praised for making issues that are rarely dealt with in public in Ukraine debatable. According to BBC News the series was "pretty much the first time that adolescent LGBT identity had been portrayed on Ukrainian TV".

The second season of the show was filmed from late May until August 2020 and was broadcast in December 2020.

== Production ==
The first season of Early Birds was filmed in two-and-a-half months with a small budget and unknown actors. The first season was eight episodes long and as of April 2020 a second season is believed to be in production. During development, series writers visited Ukrainian schools and interviewed teenagers on condition of anonymity. According to series producer Yevhen Tunik, half of the characters in the programme are based on people they knew. Tunik started the writing and pre-production of the series in 2016. He had hoped the series would debut in 2018. All of the scripts were proofread by lawyers and psychologists but according to Tunik, this did not lead to any script changes.

The title of the series, Early Birds, is a reference to the belief that swallows (Ukrainian - lastivky) are the first sign of spring.

The second season of the show was filmed from late May until August 2020. The second season was released in December 2020.

== Synopsis ==
The series revolves around the lives of Ukrainian teenagers in a secondary school class. The teenagers struggle with bullying, including the Blue Whale Challenge, lack of parental support, suicidal behaviour, LGBT identity crises—a subject that is rarely portrayed on Ukrainian television—alcoholic parents, and speech disabilities. In one of the show's main plotlines, the main characters are stalked on the Internet by an anonymous person who pretends to be their friend.

== Cast ==
- Viktoriia Lytvynenko as Olha Makarova
- Polina Nosykhina as Liera Farkash
- Maksym Samchyk as Fedia Makarov
- Taisiia-Oksana Shchuruk as Katia Shchaslyva
- Oleksandr Rudynskyi as Nick Maslov
- Mariia Smoliakova as Polina Dudka
- Olesia Zhurakivska as Larysa Dudka
- Daryna Trehubova as Tina Farkash
- Nina Naboka as Valentyna Heorhiivna

== Ratings ==
Early Birds had an audience share ranging from 8.6% to 7%. This was below the average rating of Novyi Kanal (in November 2019 the average rating of the channel was 7.8%). Detector media blamed this relatively low viewing share on its late time slot of 22:00, and because the series was programmed after a situational comedy show whose viewers would not be interested in seeing a teenage drama. All-in-all the televised episodes attract a viewership of six million viewers on live-to-air television and millions more viewers online.

The series has been described by BBC News as "a local surprise hit" because of its content of bullying, online harassment, sexual identity and suicide, all of which are rarely discussed in public in Ukraine. BBC News claimed the series was "pretty much the first time that adolescent LGBT identity had been portrayed on Ukrainian TV".

== Impact ==
Early Birds has been praised for making subjects that are rarely discussed in public in Ukraine debatable; bullying is a systemic problem in the country. During each episode, the telephone number of the non-governmental mental health helpline La Strada-Ukraine is displayed. In the series' first month, calls to the mental health helpline increased by 600%. The producers of the series approached La Strada-Ukraine to be involved in the project. According to BBC News, the series helped at least one teenage girl to stop trying to commit suicide, and has helped many gay men to reveal their sexual identity and others to stop taking part in the Blue Whale Challenge.

In February 2020, Early Birds was nominated for two Promax Awards.

== Foreign release ==
On March 29, 2020 the series was released in the Russian online movie theater KinoPoisk, for which it was specially dubbed in Russian.
