= Khyzhniak =

Khyzhniak, Khizhnyak, Khizhniak or Khyzhnyak (Ukrainian: Хижняк) is a Ukrainian surname. Notable people with the surname include:

- Antonina Khyzhniak (born 1990), Ukrainian actress
- Oleksandr Khyzhniak (born 1995), Ukrainian amateur boxer
- Oleksii Khyzhniak (soldier) (1989–2022), Ukrainian soldier
- Oleksii Khyzhniak (footballer) (born 2001), Ukrainian footballer
- Vitaliy Khyzhniak (1934–2025), Ukrainian politician
