= Danielle Zayushkina =

Ukrainian singer

- Даніела Заюшкіна
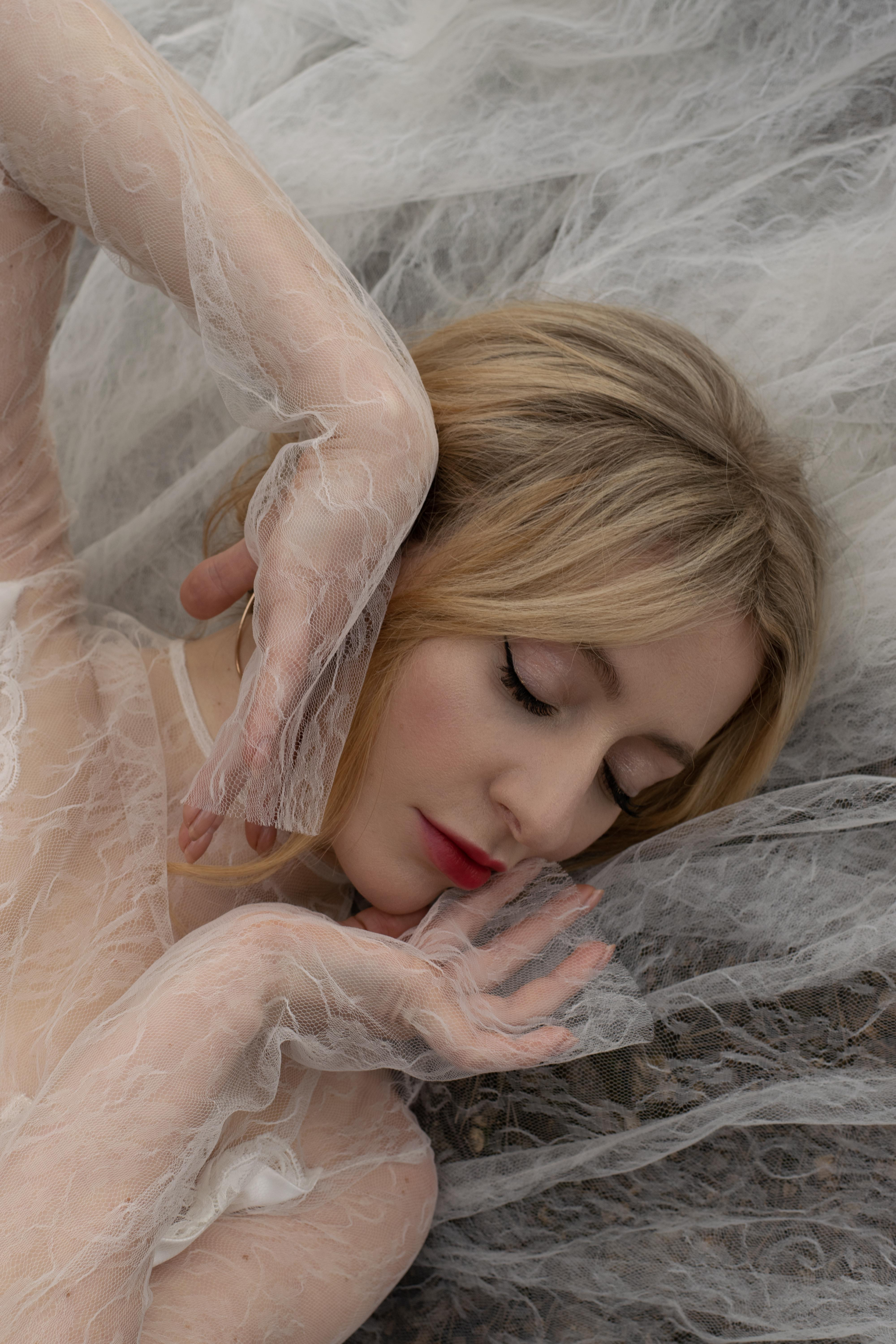
- Danielle Zayushkina in 2023
- Born: 3 January; Kyiv
- Education: Reinhold Glière Kyiv Institute of Music
- Occupations: singer, arranger, composer
- Years active: 2007-present
- Known for: Vivienne Mort

Danielle (Note: official transliteration Daniela Zaiushkina) Ihorivna Zayushkina, (Ukrainian: Даніела Ігорівна Заюшкіна; born 3 January (Note: only her birthday is public; she was presumably born in the late 1980s or early 1990s) in Kyiv) is a Ukrainian musician and headwoman of the indie rock band Vivienne Mort.

== Biography ==
Daniela Zayushkina was born in Kyiv on 3 January. She started music at the age of four, being fond of Johann Sebastian Bach's music since childhood.

In 2007 Zayushkina enrolled in Reinhold Glière Kyiv Institute of Music and graduated as a music conductor. During her sophomore year there she started the band Vivenne Mort.

In 2019 she decided to break Vivienne Mort up, however later Zayushkina decided that she could "continue to be Vivienne Mort," and released two new singles in 2021.

After the 2022 Russian invasion of Ukraine Zayushkina regularly gave concerts in support of Ukrainian army with Vivienne Mort.

== Musical style ==
Zayushkina claims that all her songs fall into two categories: personal, autobiographical, and more multi-layered, about herself, but at the same time "about the country [Ukraine], nature and life experiences in general."

== Personal life ==
Zayushkina is a vegetarian, having been not eating meat since 5 years old. She is a fan of Little Simz, Anderson Paak, Nicolas Jaar and Bilal. Zayushkina often mentions her parents in interviews, because "they were the ones who gave her the life she dreamed of." She was emo in her teens and suffered from anorexia nervosa.

Her favourite book is Siddhartha by Hermann Hesse.
