= Taisiia-Oksana Shchuruk =

Ukrainian actress (born 1998)

- Born: 20 November 1998 (age 27); Kyiv, Ukraine
- Education: Kyiv National University
- Occupation: Actress
- Years active: 2015–present
- Known for: Kyiv Day and Night; Early Swallows

Taisiia-Oksana Vitaliivna Shchuruk (born 20 November 1998) is a Ukrainian actress who primarily known for her role Katia Shchaslyva in teen drama series Early Swallows and Taisiia in reality television series Kyiv Day and Night.

== Early life and education ==
Perceived as non-Eastern Slavic naming customs, her full name is Taisiia-Oksana Vitaliivna Shchuruk. The name "Taisiia" and "Oksana" was frequently used by her father and godfather, then her relatives adapted as compound name. Her brother also proposed masculine name like Lev-Zorian.

Shchuruk stated that she had suffered from blindness and use glasses during high-school years. She coveted to be an actress at younger age. In order to do so, Taisiia-Oksana began engaging with modelling, dancing and acting in her class. She graduated in 2019 and entered acting department of Ivan Karpenko-Karyi in Kyiv National University.

== Career ==
Shchuruk began her career in 2015 television show Real Mystic, as a cameo role, and in the same year, she took a role in Ukrainian medical melodrama Clinic. She rolled for one episode in Clinic. Later, she has a successful role in 2016 reality television show Kyiv Day and Night, partaking her real name. In this series, she encounters adolescence problem and family conflict. She led the series up to third season, and quit the series of her willingness, began pursuing other television shows. Shchuruk then focused in films such as Life on the Edge and medical drama series Doctor Kovalchuk in 2018. In that year, she rolled in the psychological horror series Morena with character of Anya. In this series, Anya finds herself in mystical place called Carpathians and embarks adventurous life for survival. She became popular in the teen drama series Early Swallows, dealing with young adolescent who overcome with the threatening. Her role has been praised by BBC News and the series itself earned positive reviews for its awareness of sexual harassment, bullying, and suicide. Katia Shchaslyva finds herself with unfavorable life situation and her family become distressed. She began managing herself and left her family, where she finally finds a boy and begin a new life.

== Filmography ==
Year	Title	Role
2015	Clinic	
2015	Real Mystic	
2016	Investigators	
2016	Kyiv Day and Night	Taisiia
2017	Doctor Kovalchuk	
2017	Life on the Edge	
2018	Morena	Anya
2019	Nightmare Director, or School No.5	Margot
2019	Early Swallows	Katia Shchaslyva
