= Artur Lohai =

Ukrainian actor and singer

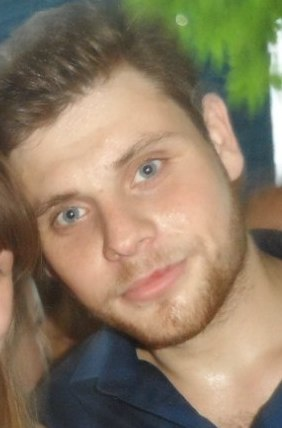
- Lohai in 2015
- Born: Artur Serhiiovych Lohai; 12 September 1993 (age 32); Vesele, Zaporizhzhia Oblast, Ukraine
- Occupations: Actor; singer
- Years active: 2014–present
- Known for: Kiev Day and Night; X Factor participant in Ukrainian version
- Spouse: Yevheniia Lohai (m. 2018)
- Children: 2

Artur Serhiiovych Lohai (Ukrainian: Артур Сергійович Логай; born 12 September 1993) is a Ukrainian actor and singer the best known acting in reality television show Kiev Day and Night, portraying in real name character. He was The X Factor contestant in 2014.

== Early life and career ==
Artur Lohai was born on 12 September 1993 in Vesele, Zaporizhzhia Oblast, Ukraine. He studied international tourism in Zaporizhzhia National Technical University for two years. In his early age, Artur enjoyed listening music of various musicians such as Adam Levine of Maroon 5, Sviatoslav Vakarchuk, John Newman, James Arthur, Ivan Dorn and Eminem. Artur aspired to participate in The X Factor and to become a singer. Artur returned to Kyiv and participated to Ukrainian version X Factor from August to November 2014.

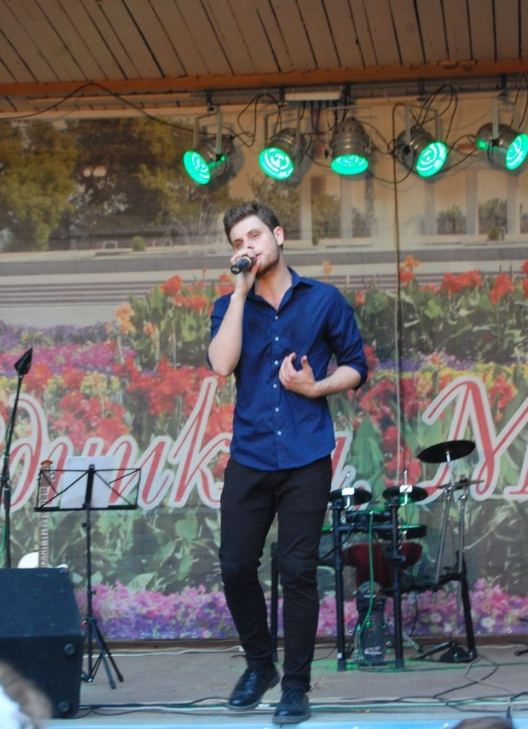
Artur in June 2015

Categorized into Georgian singer Nino Katamadze, Artur included TOP-12, and took 12th position. In 2017, Artur played in Millennium Theatre portraying as Bruno in the play of Thirst, based on novel "Camera Obscura" by Vladimir Nabokov. He rose to prominence in the 2016 reality soap opera Kiev Day and Night, taking his real name in the character.

He began casting several films since 2019: such as Secrets, Big Uncles and Community. Artur also portrayed as Andrii Vasylenko in 2020 drama series To Catch the Kaidash. He portrayed as a supporting role.

== Personal life ==
Artur has dated Kiev Day and Night co-star Yevheniia Lohai, which she appeared as role of Diana in season 4. They were married in May 2018 and together have two children, Lev Lohai and Herman Lohai.

== Filmography ==
=== Television and film ===
Year	Title	Role	Notes
2016–17	Kiev Day and Night	Himself	Minor
2018	Witches	Mike	
2019	On Sunday morning the potion dog	Novel	Main
2019	Secrets	Stas Horskyi	
2019	Big Circles	Andrii Mykytiuk	
2019	Community	Nazar	Main
2020	Consultant	Oleksandr Shchur	Minor
2020	To Catch the Kaidash	Andrii Vasylenko	Supporting
