= O.Torvald =

Ukrainian rock band

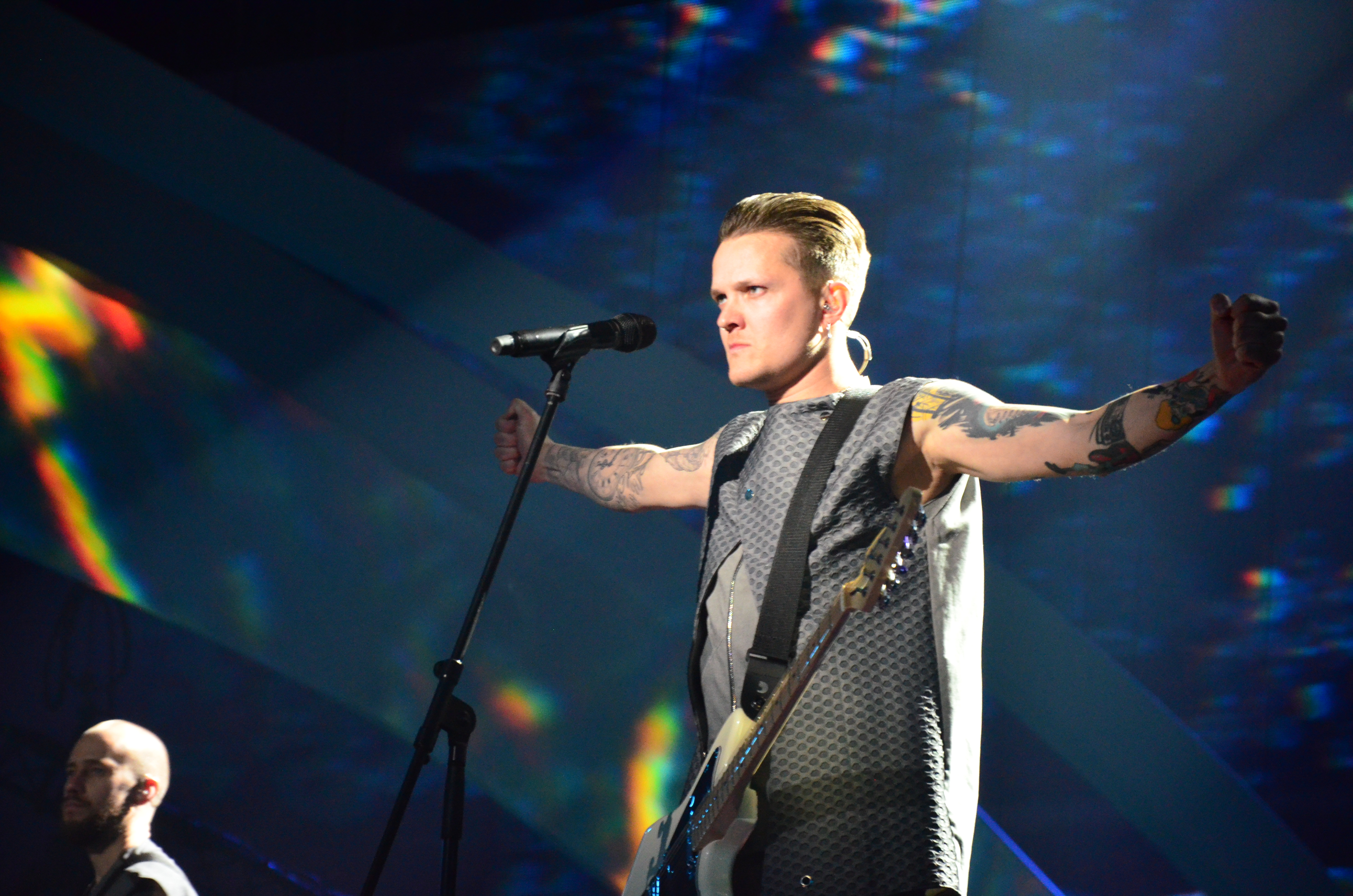

Background information
- Origin: Poltava, Ukraine
- Genres: Rock; alternative rock; pop punk; alternative metal; punk rock
- Years active: 2005–present
- Labels: Moon Records
- Members: Yevhen Halych; Denys Myzyuk; Mykola Rayda; Eugene Ilyin
- Past members: Oleksandr Nechyporenko; Andriy Lytvynok; Ihor Odaryuk; Volodymyr Yakovlev; Anastasia Sereda “Hebi”
- Website: otorvald.ua

O.Torvald (Ukrainian: Оторвальд) is a Ukrainian rock band. It was formed in 2005 in Poltava, Ukraine. Its debut album O.Torvald was recorded in 2008. O.Torvald took part in festivals such as GBOB, Chervona Ruta, Tavria games, Prosto Rock (with Linkin Park and Garbage), Zakhid, Krashche Misto UA (with Evanescence and The Rasmus), Ekolomyja and Global Gathering. They represented Ukraine in the Eurovision Song Contest 2017 with the song "Time" finishing in 24th place. In 2018, the group moved to Poland. Their activity in cultural life has decreased somewhat since this time, although they have released several songs and video clips.

== Members ==
- Yevhen Halych – vocals, guitar (2005–present)
- Denys Myzyuk – guitar, backing vocals (2005–present)
- Eugene Ilyin – bass (2017–present)
- Mykola Rayda – piano, DJ (2008–present)

== Discography ==
=== Studio albums ===
Title	Details
O.Torvald	Released: 2008; Label: Yenisey Group; Format: Digital download, CD
В тобі (In you)	Released: 2011; Label: Moon Records; Format: Digital download, CD
Примат (Primate)	Released: 2012; Label: Moon Records; Format: Digital download, CD
Ти Є (You are)	Released: November 2014; Label: Moon Records; Format: Digital download, CD
#нашілюдивсюди (#ourpeopleareeverywhere)	Released: 1 September 2016; Label: Mickey Sound; Format: Digital download, CD

=== Extended plays ===
Title	Details
Використовуй нас (Use Us)	Released: 2012; Label: Moon Records; Format: Digital download, CD

=== Other albums ===
Title	Details
Акустичний (Acoustic)	Released: 2012; Label: Moon Records; Format: Digital download, CD
Бісайди	Released: 2017

=== Singles ===
Title	Year	Peak chart positions	Album
Title	Year	RUS	Album
"Почуття"	2008	—	Non-album singles
"Не грузи"	2009	—	Non-album singles
"УЙ"	2010	—	Non-album singles
"Качай"	2010	—	В тобі
"Нас двоє"	2011	—	В тобі
"Без тебе"	2012	—	Примат'
"Mr. DJ"	2012	—	Примат'
"Все спочатку"	2014	—	Ти Є'
"Крик"	2014	—	Ти Є'
"Киев Днем и Ночью"	2016	—	Kyiv Day and Night OST
"Вирвана"	2016	—	#нашiлюдивсюди
"#нашiлюдивсюди"	2016	189	#нашiлюдивсюди
"Твой дух — твое оружие"	2016	—	Правило бою OST
"Mama"	2016	—	Non-album singles
"Time"	2017	188	Non-album singles
"—" denotes a single that did not chart or was not released.

=== Music videos ===
Year	Title	Language	Album
2006	"Не залишай"	Ukrainian	"O.Torvald"
2007	"Мама"	Ukrainian	"O.Torvald"
2007	"Почуття"	Ukrainian	"O.Torvald"
2008	"Зі мною ти"	Ukrainian	"O.Torvald"
2008	"Київ-Лондон"	Ukrainian	"O.Torvald"
2009	"Не грузи"	Ukrainian	Single
2010	"УЙ"	Ukrainian	Single
2010	"Качай"	Ukrainian	"В тобі"
2011	"Нас двоє"	Ukrainian	"В тобі"
2011	"Не відпускай"	Ukrainian	"В тобі"
2012	"Без тебе"	Ukrainian	Single
2012	"Светлые дни"	Russian	Single
2012	"Mr. DJ"	Ukrainian	"Примат"
2013	"Не вона"	Ukrainian	"Примат"
2014	"Все з початку"	Ukrainian	"Ти Є"
2015	"Там де я"	Ukrainian	"Ти Є"
2016	"Сніг"	Ukrainian	"Ти Є"
2016	"Киев днём и ночью"	Russian	Киев Днем и Ночью OST
2016	"Твой дух — твоё оружие"	Russian	"#нашілюдивсюди"
2016	"#нашілюдивсюди"	Ukrainian	"#нашілюдивсюди"
2017	"L.V."	Ukrainian	"Біссайди"
2018	"Ліхтарі"	Ukrainian	"Біссайди"
2019	"Два Нуль Один Вісім"	Ukrainian	
2019	"Назовні"	Ukrainian	
2019	"Десь не тут"	Ukrainian	

Awards and achievements
Preceded by Jamala with "1944"	Ukraine in the Eurovision Song Contest; 2017	Succeeded by Mélovin with "Under the Ladder"
