= To Catch the Kaidash =

- Спіймати Кайдаша
- Genre: drama, tragicomedy, comedy
- Based on: Kaidash's Family by Ivan Nechuy-Levytsky
- Directed by: Oleksandr Timenko
- Country of origin: Ukraine
- Original languages: Ukrainian; Surzhyk; Russian
- No. of seasons: 1
- No. of episodes: 12

Production
- Running time: 45 minutes 57-65 minutes (extended version)
- Production company: ProKino

Original release
- Network: STB
- Release: 20 March – 10 September 2020

To Catch the Kaidash (Ukrainian: Спіймати Кайдаша) is a 2020 Ukrainian 12-episode television series, created by ProKino LLC for STB. The screenwriter and executive producer of the project is Nataliia Vorozhbyt. The plot of the TV series is based on the social novella Kaidash's Family by Ivan Nechuy-Levytsky.

The TV series premiered on March 2, 2020, on STB (TV Channel). Despite the significant success of the TV series, Nataliia Vorozhbyt has repeatedly stated that she does not plan to create a second season and stressed that the season 2 is unlikely to appear.

== Synopsis ==
The plot is loosely based on the novel Kaidash's Family of the Ukrainian writer Ivan Nechuy-Levytskyi. In the original, the events take place in the 1860s, several years after the cancellation of serfdom. The creator of the series Nataliia Vorozhbyt introduced many modifications in comparison with the original – the events were shifted to the period of 2000s-2010s and new storylines were added. The events of the TV series unravel chronologically from 2005 to 2014, during a decade of independent Ukraine. The main storylines display an immutable dispute between two generations of the same family – parents and children. The plot of the TV series is full of dramatic confrontations between all family members. The climax of the conflict took place in 2014, when the family is polarized by the attitude to the Maidan. One of Kaidash's sons, Lavrin, expresses his patriotic opinions during hard times for Ukraine and joins the struggle for independence. He decides to become a volunteer fighter and defend Ukraine from Russian aggression. At the same time, another Kaidash's son, Karpo, becomes a supporter of Russia. He accused the "maidanuti" (the disparaging name for the participants of the protest against Yanukovych in 2013–14) of the Revolution of Dignity and the annexation of Crimea and Donbass by Russia. The 12th episode ends in a cliffhanger.

== Original title ==
The first title of the series, as proposed by the creator Nataliia Vorozhbyt, was "Kaidash's Family of the XXI century". This is the project title used in the contract between the Ministry of Culture of Ukraine and PROKINO LLC on the production of the film, signed in November 2018.

However, the screenwriter herself interprets the idiomatic expression "to catch the Kaidash", which means to become distressed or to reflect on life, as more modern and appropriate.

The executives immediately liked the name, although the promotional department wanted to restore the original title because the viewer would have more associations with the novel. The creator of the TV-series and the creative team supported the title "to Catch the Kaidash" because Kaidash's Family would sound outdated. Besides everybody familiar with the book would expect a film version and would be disappointed with the modern adaptation. Then, those people who hated Kaidash's Family when reading it at school would not have watched it because of the title.

== Cast ==
=== Main ===
- Viktor Zhdanov – Omelko Kaidash, father (auto mechanic)
- Iryna Mak — Marusia Kaidashykha, mother (housewife)
- Taras Tsymbaliuk — Karpo Kaidash, the eldest son (auto mechanic)
- Hryhoriy Baklanov — Lavrin Kaidash, the youngest son (builder)
- Antonina Khyzhniak — Motria Kaidashenchykha, the eldest daughter-in-law (accountant)
- Daryna Fedyna — Melashka Kaidashenchykha, the youngest daughter-in-law (schoolgirl, then housewife)
- Yuliia Vrublevska — Tetiana (Tania), Kaidash's neighbor (housewife)

=== Supporting ===
- Roman Yasinovskyi — Artem Holovyshyn, Motria's ex-boyfriend
- Olena Hall-Savalska — "holovykha", the principal of the village council, Artem's mother
- Khrystyna Fedorak — Svietka, an accountant for the village council
- Liubov Kolesnykova — Palazhka Solovyikha, Tetiana's grandmother
- Nina Naboka – Baba Paraska / Paraska Hryshykha
- Yaroslav Bezkorovainyi — Vasyl, Karpo's friend
- Andriy Lutsenko — Motria's dad, Dovbysh
- Tetiana Kryzhanivska — Motria's mother, Dovbyshykha
- Anatoliy Sakhno — cameo appearance, father of Melashka Balash
- Nataliia Vorozhbyt — cameo appearance, mother of Melashka Balash
- Oleksandr Timenko — cameo appearance, veterinarian
- Ostap Dziadek — Monk
- Serhiy Kyiashko — Sasha, Melashka's lover
- Ihor Nazarov
- Volodymyr Honcharov – doctor
- Oleksandr Okhrytskyi – café administrator
- Anastasia Hyrenkova – Allochka
- Yuliya Pershuta — Iryna, Lavrin's housemate in Bohuslav
- Artur Lohai — the rich-boy customer at the car service station

=== Creative team ===
The creative team of the TV series included:

- Production director – Oleksandr Timenko
- Cinematographer – Anatoliy Sakhno
- Artistic director – Vadym Shynkarov
- Producers: Liudmyla Semchuk, Dmytro Kitsai, Volodymyr Borodianskyi
- Executive producer – Yehor Malykhin
- Screenwriter and executive producer (showrunner) is Nataliia Vorozhbyt.

== Production ==
=== Precedent stage performance ===
Initially, Nataliia Vorozhbyt created her reinterpretation of the original Ivan Nechuy-Levytsky's novel Kaidash's Family in the form of a play, and the performance "To Catch the Kaidash" was staged by Kyiv Wild Theater (directed by Maksym Holenko).

The first performance "To Catch the Kaidash" took place on May 25, 2019, at the Mystetskyi Arsenal during the Book Arsenal in 2019.

Subsequently, Vorozhbyt elaborated the play script and turned it into a full-fledged modern performance "The Kaidashes 2.0", which was included in the repertoire of Kyiv Wild Theater (directed by Maxim Golenko).

The performance "The Kaidashes 2.0" was first shown on August 2, 2019, at the House of Culture of the village of Sorokotyaga, Cherkasy region, and on August 30, 2019, in Kyiv in the theater space "Stage 6".

=== Script ===
Volodymyr Borodianskyi, general producer of STB (TV channel), commissioned Nataliia Vorozhbyt's script. The screenwriting took a year and a half in "comfortable conditions": without outside interference and editorial changes. Compared to the novel The Kaidash Family, new characters and many original storylines were incorporated into the script of the TV series.

After the release, Nataliia Vorozhbyt claimed that the funding provided to the TV series creators was not enough to shoot the story in its entirety, so they filmed in "rather difficult" conditions. In particular, many scenes and details from the script were not shot and were not included into the TV version.

=== Budget ===
After the change of the STB channel management, the new creative producer of StarLightFilms Dmytro Kitsai offered Vorozhbyt to become a showrunner of the project and apply for the government financial support.

The project called "Kaidash's Family XXI" won the competition of patriotic films run by the Ministry of Culture of Ukraine in 2018, so the filming of the TV series was 50% funded by the government: with a total budget of ₴26.7 million, the Ministry of Culture allocated half of the cost — ₴13.3 million.

=== Filming ===
The filming locations of "To Catch the Kaidash" were a film studio in Kyiv, the village of Dereviana, Obukhiv district, Kyiv region, and the surrounding villages (Khalepia, Yatsky, and Lypovyi Skytok). For filming, the producers specifically built a wooden courtyard and a house for the Kaidash family. Overall, the shooting lasted three months from March to May 2019. The shooting was carried out by the production company PROKINO of the StarLightMedia group. Obukhiv is mentioned in the seventh episode of the TV series – Lavrin Kaidash goes to work there.

=== Soundtrack ===
The music in the TV series was mostly Ukrainian and some Russian pop music of the 1990s and early 2000s: the song "Poliubi menia takoi" ("Love me like that") by Natalia Mohylevska, «Dym sigaret s mentolom» ("Smoke of menthol cigarettes") by Nensi, "Sneg" ("Snow") by Iryna Bilyk and Philip Kirkorov, "Kapli Absenta" ("Drops of absinth") by Irakli, etc.

After the release of the TV series, the screenwriter and executive producer Nataliia Vorozhbyt said that she did not regret using Russian-language pop music in the series, as it was "the reality of life".

Vorozhbyt also admitted that initially, according to the idea of the creators, one of the songs of the Russian group Ruki Vverkh! was to play in the first episode. However, this never happened because currently, due to "financial" or "political" reasons, the creators of the Ukrainian TV series almost do not have the opportunity to buy the rights to songs of Russian artists (the producers were able to acquire the rights to the song of Nancy solely thanks to "mutual acquaintances").

In addition to Russian-language songs, the TV series also uses original instrumental music of the Ukrainian ethnic-group DakhaBrakha, written by the composer specifically for the TV series, and the track "Shcho z-pod duba" ("From Under the Oak"). According to Nataliia Vorozhbyt, the creative team wanted to buy more songs of DakhaBrakha, but the project had a limited budget.

Moreover, in the TV series there are Ukrainian folk and popular songs:

- "Oy Vershe Miy, Vershe" ("Oh Mountain, My Mountain")
- "Oy, u vishnevomu sadu" ("In the Cherry Orchard")
- "Zeleneye zhyto, zelene" ("Green Rye")
- "Dva kol'ori" ("Two colors") (this song appears at the end of the final, 12th episode of the TV series)
- "A ja vse dyvliusia de moja Marusia" ("And I Always Look to See Where my Dear Mary Is")
- "Rozpryahayte, khloptsi, koney" ("Unbridle the Horses")
- "A vesillia azh hude" ("The Wedding is Already Buzzing")

=== Language ===
According to the agreement with the Ministry of Culture about the creation of a national patriotic film, signed in February 2018, and according to the law "On Cinematography", at least 90% of the film's lines must be in Ukrainian and no more than 10% in a foreign language.

In the final version, some of the characters of the series speak surzhyk (mixed sociolects of Ukrainian and Russian languages). Even during the filming, the actor Taras Tsimbaliuk said that the series was being filmed in "flavorsome surzhyk":

According to actor Taras Tsymbaliuk, surzhyk "unites all the Ukrainian colorful villages. The actors will present themselves to the audience as simply as possible, as if it were a dialogue behind the fence of an ordinary Bohuslav family.

Nataliia Vorozhbyt, the screenwriterwriter, does not consider the language of the series to be surzhyk, calling it "colloquial Ukrainian," which "has more than 70% of Ukrainian words. According to Vorozhbyt, it was the selection of convenient organic words and constructions that helped the actors get into their characters into.

In addition to surzhyk and Ukrainian, the TV series also features Russian, which is spoken by three supporting characters.

== Release ==
In Ukraine, the premiere of the TV series was originally planned on the STB channel in late February 2020, but was later postponed to March 2, 2020.

== Seasons and episodes ==
Season	Episode	Original screenings	
		Premiere	Finale
1	12	March 2, 2020	March 11, 2020
1 (extended version)	12	August 31, 2020	September 10, 2020

Season 1

Episode No.	Title	Director(s)	Screenwriter(s)	Original air date
1	"First episode"	Oleksandr Timenko	Nataliia Vorozhbyt	March 2, 2020

Lavrin returns from the military service and is greeted by his family. His neighbor Tania is especially pleased to see him and makes love with Lavrin on the first night after his return to spite Karpo. At the same party, Karpo sees Motria and falls in love with her. He invites her to the club, but she comes with Artem, the son of the collective farm chairman. Lavrin hangs out with other girls, while Karpo is pining for Motria. He is certain that she is marrying Artem. Kaidashykha advises Karpo to confess his sins. He goes to the church and meets Motria there. She says that she is not getting married, but is going to work in the town. On the day of her departure, Karpo kidnaps her right from the bus stop.

Episode No.	Title	Director(s)	Screenwriter(s)	Original air date
2	"Second episode"	Oleksandr Timenko	Nataliia Vorozhbyt	March 2, 2020

Tania catches Karpo and Motria making love in the woods. She is desperate. Motria forces Karpo to propose to her. Their parents are against the marriage. Kaidash is forced to get into debt because of the wedding. Tania tries to poison herself with medicines on the wedding day. Lavrin goes with her to the hospital, she is saved and he finds out about her pregnancy. During the wedding, Karpo finds out that Motria slept with Artem. He makes a scene because she was lying to him. As a condition of reconciliation, he requires to move from Motria's wealthy parents to the Kaidash family. Motria's wedding night takes place in the brothers' shared room, and already at six in the morning Kaidashykha wakes her up for work.

Episode No.	Title	Director(s)	Screenwriter(s)	Original air date
3	"Third episode"	Oleksandr Timenko	Nataliia Vorozhbyt	March 3, 2020

Motria tries to please her mother-in-law and does all the housework, but overhears Kaidashykha discussing her with Baba Palazhka, calling her lazy. Motria takes revenge and quarrels break out in the Kaidash house. Kaidash gets the blue devils for the first time during one of the quarrels. Motria accidentally finds Tania's letter in which she confesses her love and that she is pregnant by Karpo. Motria and Karpo quarrel and reconcile passionately. Lavrin sleeps in the kitchen, reads books and goes out with the girls. He is fed up with the arguments, and he, along with Artem, goes to work in the nearest town – Bohuslav. On Christmas, Lavrin comes back home and catches a grand scandal. He goes to Tania and sees her pregnant.

Episode No.	Title	Director(s)	Screenwriter(s)	Original air date
4	"Fourth episode"	Oleksandr Timenko	Nataliia Vorozhbyt	March 3, 2020

Every weekend Lavrin comes to the village from work and brings gifts not only for the relatives, but also for Tania, who recently gave birth to a girl. There are rumors in the village that Lavrin helps her for a reason. Tania gratefully accepts the help and has hope that Lavrin will marry her. Karpo is worried, suspecting that Tania's baby is his. Motria, who can't get pregnant, is even angrier because of this. Motria takes a job at the village council as an accountant. This causes Karpo to be jealous, because her boss is Artem's mother. Lavrin promises to go with Tania to the Pentecost celebration, but the day before he meets the girl of his dreams – Melashka.

Episode No.	Title	Director(s)	Screenwriter(s)	Original air date
5	"Fifth episode"	Oleksandr Timenko	Nataliia Vorozhbyt	March 4, 2020

The Kaidashes go for matchmaking to Melashka, where they find out that she is from a very poor family. And most importantly, she is underage and goes to school. Lavrin did not know about it either, and now he tries to come up with something to get his parents to let them get married. He finds a way out – to conceive a child with Melashka. Motria is worried about the living situation. She persuades Lavrin to renovate the barn. He agrees and makes a nice renovation. Motria is jealous and wants to move in there with Karpo. Out of spite, she buries their dog's little puppies. But then she tries to dig them up. Only one puppy stays alive.

Episode No.	Title	Director(s)	Screenwriter(s)	Original air date
6	"Sixth episode"	Oleksandr Timenko	Nataliia Vorozhbyt	March 5, 2020

Motria and Karpo live in the renovated barn, while pregnant Melashka and Lavrin live in the Kaidash house. Motria adores her dog. The only thing that does not give her peace - the joint property with the Kaidashes. During one of the quarrels, Motria and Kaidashykha get into a physical fight, Karpo pushes his father - and it all ends up with them going to the police. There they are advised to divide the property. Lavrin and Tania reconcile. She also makes friends with Melashka; the latter becomes the godmother of Tania's daughter Anzhelina. The godfather happens to be Artem, Motria's ex-boyfriend.

Episode No.	Title	Director(s)	Screenwriter(s)	Original air date
7	"Seventh episode"	Oleksandr Timenko	Nataliia Vorozhbyt	March 5, 2020

Lavrin goes to work as a builder in Obukhiv, and Melashka stays alone with the child. Kaidashykha does everything to make Melashka spend as little time as possible with her child. Melashka accidentally finds out that Tania is sleeping with Artem. Motria's dog is poisoned. Karpo and Motria take him to Bohuslav to the vet and then stay overnight at an inn there. After returning to the village, Karpo goes to Tania and suggests tadopting Anzhelina. But Artem comes out and states that he will adopt Tania's children. Returning from hunting, Karpo sees a pack of dogs fighting near Anzhelina. Without thinking, he shoots at the pack and inadvertently kills Motria's dog. Motria leaves him and goes to her parents. Karpo suffers. He is offered a job in Bohuslav. Moving to Bohuslav is a chance to return Motria. Motria agrees to move. They get tested and it turns out that they cannot have children due to Karpo's infertility.

Episode No.	Title	Director(s)	Screenwriter(s)	Original air date
8	"Eighth episode"	Oleksandr Timenko	Nataliia Vorozhbyt	March 9, 2020

April 1 is coming – Marusia Kaidashykha's birthday. The hostess starts making preparations three days before the birthday. She butchers a chicken, cooks a lot of meat dishes and salads, sets the table and starts waiting for the guests. But the whole family forgot about her birthday. To make amends, Lavrin and Melashka decide to give the mother a present – Motria's tea set, which happened to be at hand. Karpo gives the mother a "new" mobile phone, which he confiscated from one of the customers of the service station where he works, because the customer refused to pay for car repairing. Omelko continues to drink himself to death. He is ready to give away his watch for a bottle of horilka and even kneel down in front of a saleswoman in a store. Constant drinking results in the old man becoming delirious again and even losing his speech. His family take him to Bohuslav to see specialized doctors, but the doctors just shrug their shoulders.

Episode No.	Title	Director(s)	Screenwriter(s)	Original air date
9	"Ninth episode"	Oleksandr Timenko	Nataliia Vorozhbyt	March 9, 2020

In Semyhory people celebrate the New Year. Tania and Artem are going to visit Lavrin and Melashka, who are about to have a second baby. Karpo, the eldest son of the Kaidashes, and his wife Motria return from Bohuslav to the village and start living with Motria's parents. But even here, Motriais still worried. Her own mother hassles her saying that she has married the wrong man and has to divorce, while she is still young. Out of boredom, Motria gets so drunk at a New Year's party in the village council building that she forgets the way home. While miraculously abstaining from alcohol, Omelko starts going to the church and obeying the commandments of God. It seems as the long-awaited peace has finally come to the Kaidash house. But it does not last long, because on the New Year's Eve Motria decides to move back to the village and evict Lavrin and Melashka back to the parents' house.

Episode No.	Title	Director(s)	Screenwriter(s)	Original air date
10	"Tenth episode"	Oleksandr Timenko	Nataliia Vorozhbyt	March 10, 2020

The temporary peace that has reigned in the family gets broken by Melashka. She stops cooking and looking after the children and, instead, begins to speak harshly to her mother-in-law. Exhausted Lavrin is always at work to feed his family. His mother has been cooking for him for a second week. Amid all this mess, Easter comes . Baba Paraska gathers people who want to go to the Kyiv-Pechersk Lavra for Easter cakes blessing. Melashka suddenly gets the urge to join the pilgrims on their journey. Kaidashykha is not happy because she does not want to clean the house herself before the holiday. But the very pious Omelko defends his daughter-in-law. Melashka goes to Kyiv and meets a woman who sells Easter eggs, and she offers her a job. Melaska escapes from Baba Paraska's control and stays at the art workshop. She sends an apology message to Lavrin. Lavrin and his father come to Kyiv and try to find Melashka, showing her photo to visitors of the Lavra, but return home disappointed. While working in Kyiv, Malashka meets another man from Donetsk and starts an affair with him. The woman, Melashka lives and works with, decides to tell Lavrin what has happened to his wife.

Episode No.	Title	Director(s)	Screenwriter(s)	Original air date
11	"Eleventh episode"	Oleksandr Timenko	Nataliia Vorozhbyt	March 11, 2020

A year passes after Melashk's has escape to Kyiv on Easter and her later return to the village. Now her parents-in-law try to talk to her more gently, give her less work, and Lavrin takes enormous care of his wife. But this peace is too fragile and can collapse any time because Melashka's phone's been blowing up with texts from her lover Sasha from Donetsk, whom she met in Kyiv. He continues to woo her, and Melashka does not hesitate to tell Tatiana and Sveta that she has fallen out of love with her husband. Omelko also has troubles: after a trip to Kyiv, he starts drinking again. Horilka affects him so much that he faints, becomes delirious, confuses the past with the present. He decides to get coded for alcoholism again: this time in Bohuslav. Motria accidentally tells Lavrin during their argument that Melashka is still dating her lover.

Episode No.	Title	Director(s)	Screenwriter(s)	Original air date
12	"Twelfth episode"	Oleksandr Timenko	Nataliia Vorozhbyt	March 11, 2020

The family has been living without a firm parental hand for a year — the father is paralyzed. Ukraine was also left without a head of state after the betrayal of Yanukovych and his flight to Russia. Euromaidan swept the oligarchs out of power, and after Russia's military aggression against Ukraine in the Crimea and Donbass, the Russo-Ukrainian War began. Karpo, in difficult times for Ukraine, shows his pro-Russian essence: he blames Euromaidan for everything, calls the Revolution of Dignity a virus of "maidanuti". He is angry because his employer and the local leader of the "Party of Regions" disappears, and he is left without a job. Lavrin cannot listen to his brother's anti-Ukrainian propaganda as well as cannot believe how it is possible to betray his nation. Semyhory has not been spared of the scourge — Vasyl, a friend of Karpo and Lavrin, are drafted into the army and go missing in the Battle of Ilovaisk. There are lots of refugees from eastern Ukraine in the village. Families are divided into two camps: some are sympathetic to the displaced people and ready to give them everything needed, while others see them as pro-Russian traitors and want them to leave Semyhory. Sveta often cries because of Vasyl, while Melashka cannot help thinking about Sasha from Donetsk, who also stopped writing to her. Motria finally gets pregnant. Lavrin decides to become a volunteer fighter.

== Television ratings ==
During the premiere showing of the series on STB TV channel from March 2 to 11, 2020, 10.5 million viewers tuned in. More than 1,800,000 viewers watched the first episode on YouTube.

== Reviews ==
After the broadcast in the spring of 2020, the series drew a significant response in the Ukrainian society. In particular, after the release of the series, it received positive reviews on social media, with users expressing their admiration for the choice of the cast, making the series one of the most discussed projects. Many reviewers called the series a "mirror" of the Ukrainians' real life. In addition, it has been repeatedly compared on social media with the TV series "Svaty" (adding that it is for "a more intelligent" audience).

At the same time, the series received contradictory reviews from film critics, whose reactions ranged from absolute delight to complete disappointment with the series. According to some film critics and viewers, one of the biggest drawbacks of the series is the use of surzhyk.

Film critic Serhiy Trymbach spoke positively about the series. In his opinion, the filmmakers managed to "place all the characters on the film "board" very accurately", corresponding to the motif of Ivan Nechuy-Levytskyi's novel. He also noted the language changes between the early series and later ones:

it is emphasized that the tear-off calendar <...> is in Russian, i.e. in the usual imperial discourse. And in the final episodes, the calendar is already in Ukrainian, as well as the songs (in the first episodes we hear mostly Russian pop music), radio and TV. That is, the words, the language itself begin to feel differently, they themselves become something else.

Ukrainian writer Serhiy Zhadan commented favorably on the film, calling it "an incredibly important and vivid phenomenon" of the Ukrainian cinematography. In his opinion, "no one has spoken so simply and convincingly about Ukrainians for a long time".

Nazar Danchyshyn, a reviewer, positively assessed Nataliia Vorozhbyt's parallels between Ukraine in Nechuy-Levytskyi's work and Ukraine after the proclamation of Independence. In particular, he draws an analogy between the serfdom abolition and the compulsory collective farms abolition after which the peasants live in the novel and TV series respectively. Danchyshyn also commended the acting, directing and cinematography in the series.

In general, having positively assessed the series, art critic Lena Chychenina noted that some viewers complained about the use of surzhyk in the series. Other viewers, on the contrary, admired the language of the series and praised the organic, real surzhyk.

Filmmaker Valentyn Vasianovych gave a negative review of the series, citing its pathos, vulgarity, bad editing, poor acting and sharovarschyna (a low-quality culture that speculates on national motives). However, he noted that he had watched only 15 minutes of the first episode. For those film critics and viewers who did not like it, the biggest drawback of the series was the language of the series, or rather the frequent use of surzhyk. Yaroslav Sumyshyn, a journalist, called surzhyk "the biggest flaw of the series, and noted that the series popularizes surzhyk, subconsciously instilling in movie fans a disdainful attitude towards the Ukrainian language". A similar opinion was expressed by journalist Yulia Vvedenska, who also called surzhyk the biggest drawback of the series, and noted that although "surzhyk should have added the "atmosphere" and "rural flavor", it often just "grates on the ear.""; Vvedenska sums up her review noting that the overall impression of the series is negative and you feel "as if [you] were spoon-fed the image of the "average Ukrainian peasant", densely seasoned by toxic Kremlin propaganda". Yuriy Shevchuk, a professor and the head of the Ukrainian film club at Columbia University, was even more categorical about the language of the series, calling the series "the pinnacle of primitiveness, bad taste and falsehood, which encourages surzhyk, i.e. the pathetic brand of Moscow slavery".

== A possible sequel ==
Despite the significant success of the series, Nataliia Vorozhbyt repeatedly stated in interviews with Ukrainian media that she did not plan to make a second season because "this is a complete story". However, she does not entirely exclude such a possibility if she is provided with "comfortable conditions" for writing the script, allowing her to write it for a year and a half.

Nataliia Vorozhbyt also noted that there are many scenes that were not included into the final version of the TV series, and there is a possibility that TV channel "STB" will release an "extended director's cut" of the first season. An extended version of the series was broadcast on "STB" from August 31 to September 10, 2020.
