= Kateryna Yeremenko =

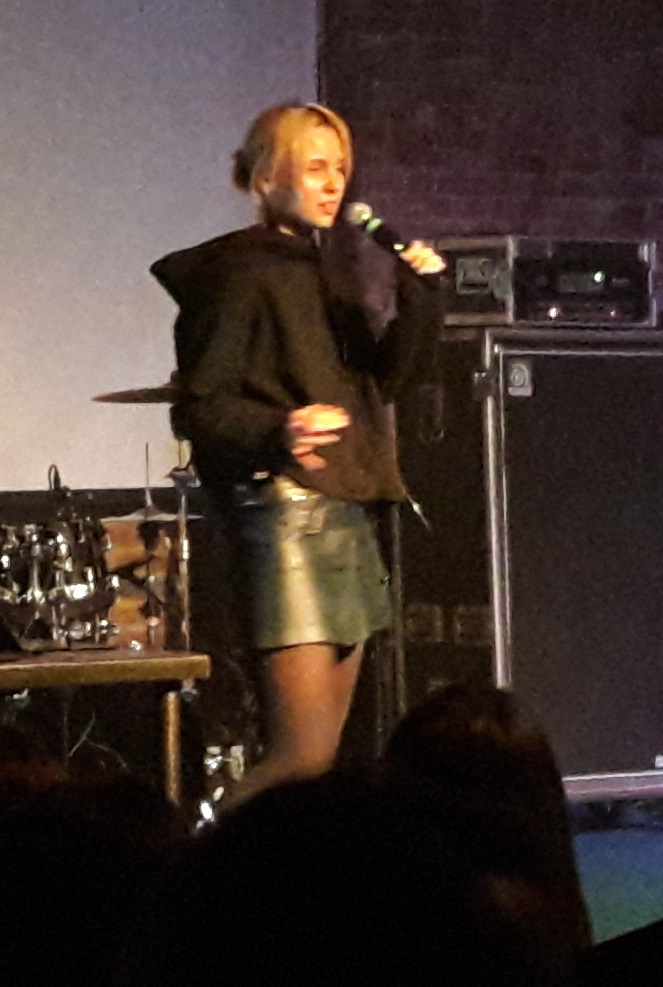
- Dakooka in 2019

Background information
- Born: November 29, 1993 (age 32); Chernivtsi, Ukraine
- Genres: Electronic; Trip-hop; Drum and bass; Indie rock; Pop; Exprerimental

Kateryna Yeremenko (born November 29, 1993, Chernivtsi, Ukraine), also known as Dakooka, is a Ukrainian singer, songwriter, and composer, who works in the electronic, trip-hop, drum and bass, indie rock, pop, and experimental genres. Dakooka has toured in Ukraine, Poland, the Czech Republic, and Germany, and participated in music festivals such as Global Gathering and KaZantip.

== Early life and education ==
Kateryna Yeremenko was born in Chernivtsi into a Russian-speaking family. As she recalled in an interview to ACC Media Agency, her grandmother used to sing lullabies in Russian since Yeremenko's early years. Since childhood, she was called by the nickname Kooka. When Yeremenko was creating her email address, "Kooka" turned out to be too short. She added "da”, and Dakooka became her pseudonym.

Yeremenko graduated from music school with a degree in piano. At the invitation of her teacher, she sang in a church choir. She later used this experience while composing her tracks; the manner of backing vocals and the use of multiple sound tracks for a more atmospheric sound were inspired by the high notes taken by choristers.

She majored in food processing engineering.

== Career ==
Yeremenko wrote her first song at the age of 18 and published it on Vkontakte as daKooka. She began to perform in Chernivtsi pubs. She formed the Dakooka Live Band with musicians she knew and started touring Ukraine.

In March 2015, Dakooka released her first album Radha. The album was recorded at Ternopil studio "Shpital Records" and comprised 11 tracks in the English language. Yeremenko named it after the Indian goddess of love. In 2016, the singer published the mini-album Очень весело с моими друзьями in the Russian language.

In 2017, Yeremenko began to perform as a solo artist. She participated in the Voice of the Country project in Potap's team. The same year, Dakooka released the mini-album Гордо with six songs in Russian.

The following year, she released the album Герой and the mini-album Форма. The former was positively assessed by critics.

In 2019, the Ukrainian TV channel Novyi Kanal released the series Early Swallows, in which Dakooka's songs were the soundtrack. The same year, she released the album Стрэнджлава.

In 2020, Dakooka released Да кто такой этот ваш Feat. The album embraced soundtracks for the second season of Early Swallows.

In 2021, Yeremenko published KTSH 3.10.06, ч. 1 mini-album. The album consisted of six “electronic-acoustic ballads” and was listed among the best Ukrainian music albums of the year, according to Vesti.ua.

In July 2021, she released her the album 31006 with the Moon Records Ukraine studio. She had been working on the album for 2 years. 31006 reflected changes in Dakooka's style, mostly using rock elements.

The singer criticised the full-scale Russian invasion of Ukraine in February 2022 and left Ukraine shortly after the beginning of the war. The same year, the Moon Records studio published Dakooka's Up & Down album. The album included 19 songs in English.

In September 2023, Dakooka presented her first Ukrainian-language album Біженка recorded at the Liberal Sound Studio in Berlin. The album contains 10 tracks, most them are Dakooka's old songs translated into Ukrainian. A new track - Присвячено Паші Лі - was dedicated to the Ukrainian actor and TV presenter who died in the war. Critics met the album negatively, criticising Yeremenko's alleged connections with Russian entrepreneurs. The same year in October, Yeremenko released a new album of electronic music, Schizophrenie, under the name "ktsh".

== Controversies ==
Yeremenko was criticized by Ukrainian media for her Russian-language songs and performances in Russia after the outbreak of the Russo-Ukrainian War in 2014. In 2017, she had concerts in Moscow at the underground festival "Боль" and at various concert venues such as the Moscow art space "INOY LOFT." In 2016–2018, her concerts in Lviv, Vinnytsia, Rivne, and Lutsk were canceled due to the singer's tour in Russia. Subsequently, music journalist and editor of "Sluch" magazine Danylo Panimash stated that despite the criticism, Yeremenko continued to perform in Russia.

In April 2023, the singer's cover album Skryabin by Dakooka was released on streaming services. The album featured songs from Skryabin's “late” period (roughly after 2003). The album was criticized for Dakooka's possible connections with the Russian digital distributor Zvonko.

== Awards ==
- YUNA Music Award (2022)
