= Maksym Holenko =

Ukrainian theatre and movie director

Maksym Heorhiyovych Holenko (born April 6, 1978, in Mykolaiv, Ukraine) is a Ukrainian director of theater and cinema, chief director of the independent "Wild Theater," and chief director of the Odessa Academic Ukrainian Music and Drama Theater named after Vasyl Vasylko (since September 29, 2020).

== Productions ==
- The Beauty Queen, 2015
- Aphrodisiac 2016
- "Woman, Sit Down" 2018
- Catching Kaidash. 2019
- Penita.opera, 2019
- To Catch the Kaidash 2020
- Chaos. Women on the verge of a nervous breakdown, 2022
