= Vivienne Mort =

Ukrainian indie rock band

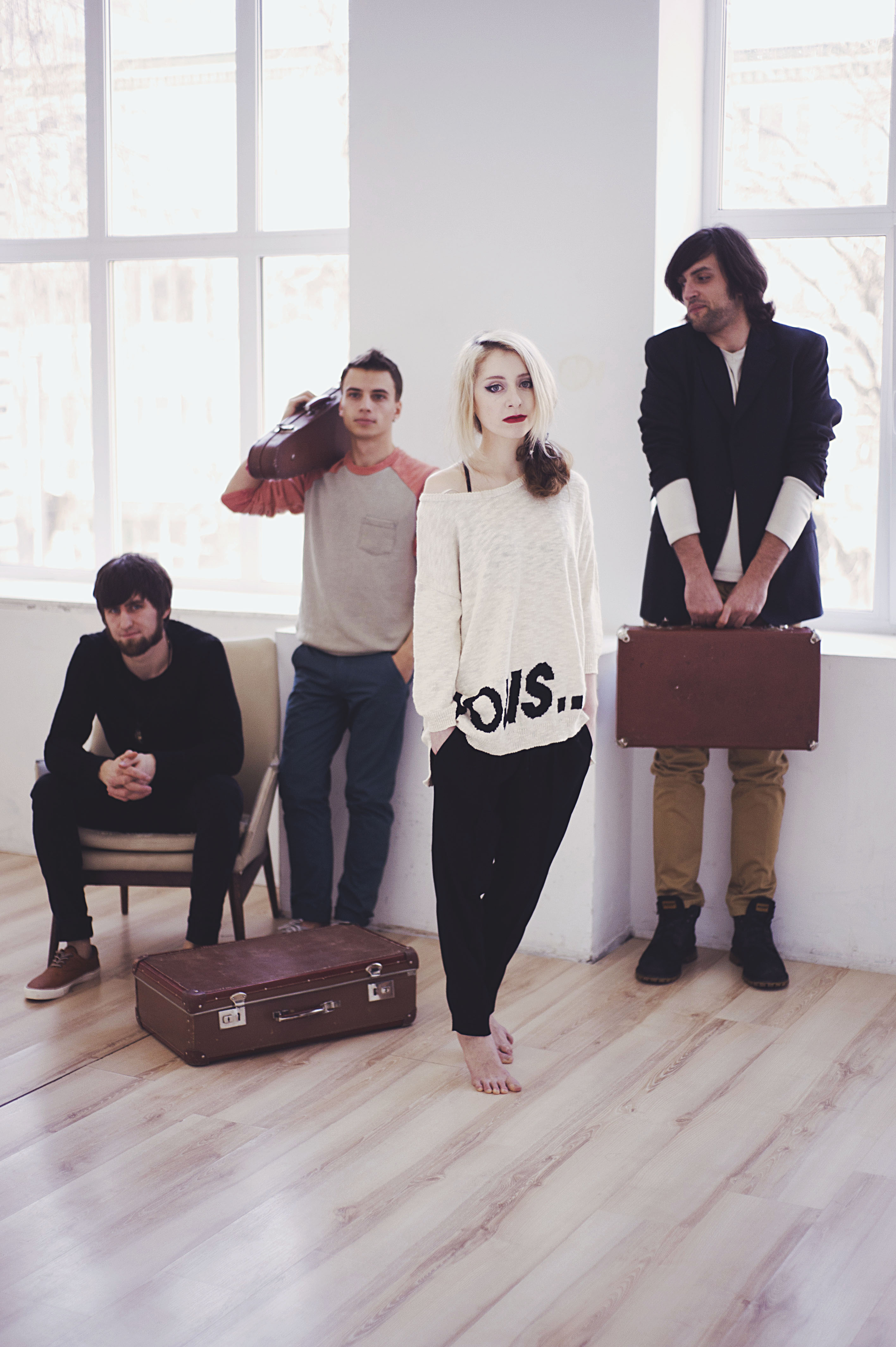
- Vivienne Mort in 2013

Background information
- Origin: Kyiv, Ukraine
- Genres: Indie rock, alternative rock
- Years active: 2007–present
- Labels: Moon Records Ukraine (2010–2015), Enjoy! Records (2016–present)
- Members: Daniela Zaiushkina – lead vocals; Hlib Protsiv – drums; Oleksandr Lezhniov – piano; Oleksandr Buliuk – bass guitar
- Website: viviennemort.com.ua

Vivienne Mort is a Ukrainian indie rock band formed by Daniela Zaiushkina in 2007.

== History ==
The first attempts to create the band were made in 2007, when singer/songwriter Daniela Zaiushkina composed her first songs. In 2008 they recorded the songs "Лети" and "День, коли святі...".

The band spent 2009 looking for musicians as well as performing some concerts. Finally, in 2010 Vivienne Mort released its debut mini album Єсєнтукі LOVE, which was voted 2010's best mini album by 7000 respondents according to ФаДієз.

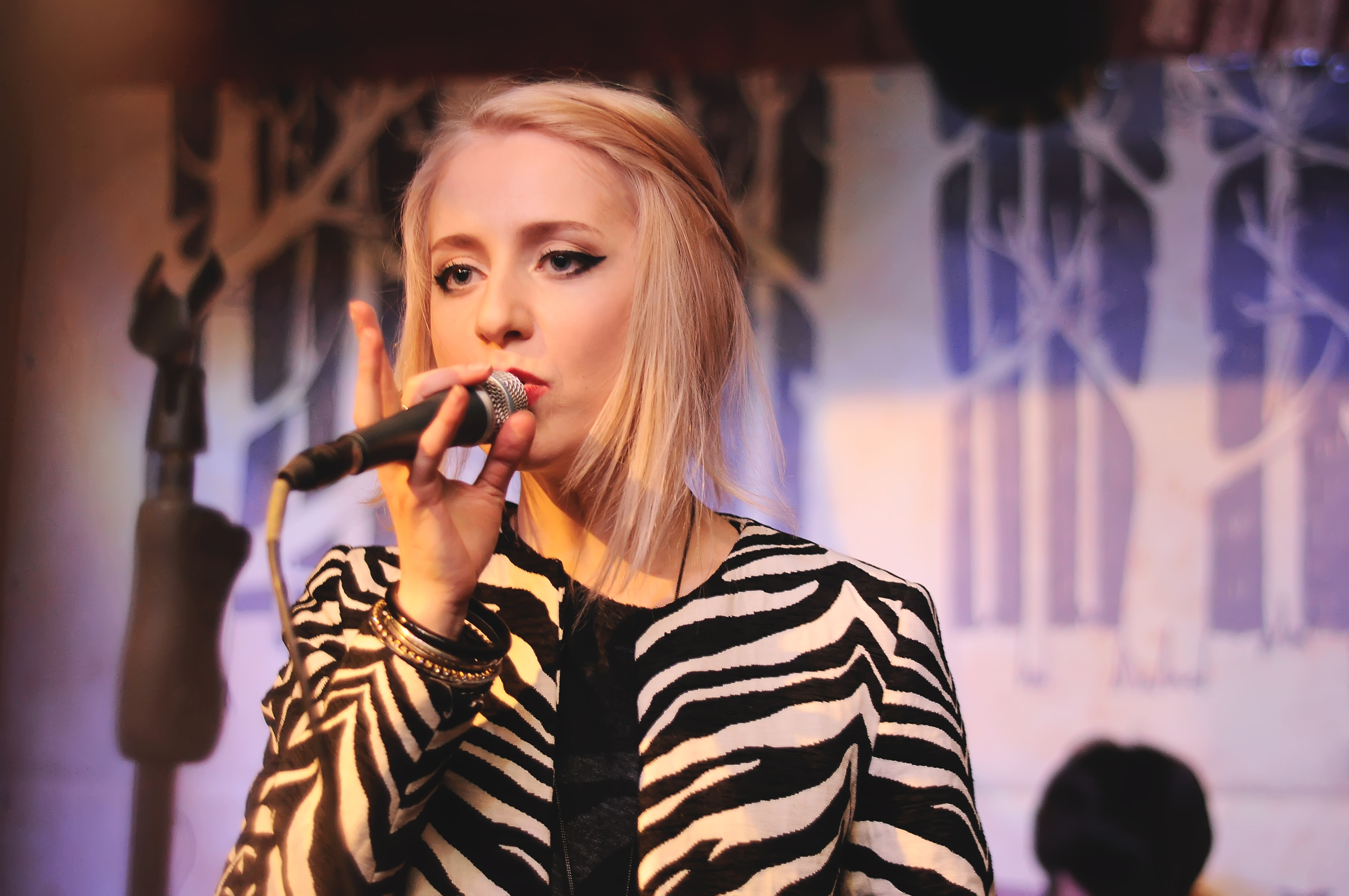
Daniela Zaiushkina, the frontwoman of the band

In 2013 the band released their first full-length album Театр Pipinó at the Revet Sound recording studio and set out on a Ukrainian tour with the aim of supporting the album. At the same time, they made a music video for the song "Сліди маленьких рук", that was broadcast and spread on the net very quickly.

In 2014 Vivienne Mort released the second mini album called Готика and a music video for the song "Риба".

The new mini album Filin is introduced on March 1, 2015. The new single "Ти забув про мене" appears shortly after that. Also, they created a music video for this song.

On March 15, 2016, the band released its fourth mini album Rósa. On April 2 they started a tour, which began in Poland and ended in Kyiv, Ukraine.

Moreover, the group made public a music video for the song "Пташечка", which was shot in Mumbai, India. Daniela stayed there from March 1 till March 15.

== Discography ==
=== Studio albums ===
- 2010: Єсєнтукі LOVE
- 2013: Театр Pipinó
- 2014: Готика
- 2015: Filin
- 2016: Rósa
- 2018: Досвід
- 2024: Фата

== Music videos ==
Year	Video	Director
2013	«Сліди маленьких рук»	Danil Bardack
2014	«Риба»	Haze
2015	«Ти забув про мене»	Oleh Borshchevskyi
2016	«Пташечка»	Daria Gai
2017	«Пам'ятаєш»	Danil Bardack
2017	«Іній»	Revet Sound
2018	«Думаю про тебе»	Anna Moskovchenko
