= Olesia Zhurakivska =

Ukrainian actress

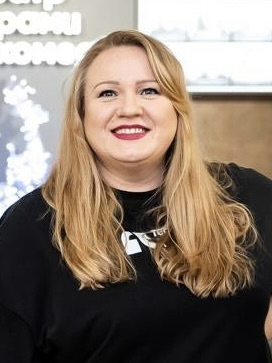
Olesia Zhurakivska

Olesia Viktorovna Zhurakivska (Ukrainian: Олеся Вікторівна Жураківська, born 13 August 1973 in Kyiv) is a Ukrainian film and theatre actress, best known for her roles in the Ukrainian television series Papik and Krіposna. She was invested with the Order of Princess Olga in 2021.
