= Antonina Khyzhniak =

Ukrainian actress

- Born: Antonina Valeriyivna Khyzniak; 28 July 1990 (age 36); Ukrainka, Ukrainian SSR, Soviet Union
- Citizenship: Ukraine
- Occupation: Actress

Antonina Valeriyivna Khyzhniak (Ukrainian: Антоніна Валеріївна Хижняк; born 28 July 1990) is a Ukrainian actress.

== Biography ==
Khyzhniak was born on 28 July 1990 in the city of Ukrainka in Kyiv Oblast. In 2012, she graduated from the Kyiv National I. K. Karpenko-Kary Theatre, Cinema and Television University. After her studies, Khizhnyak worked at the Kyiv Academic Puppet Theatre. She has dubbed and voiced in Ukrainian and is the official Ukrainian voice of Daisy Ridley and Alicia Vikander. On 2 March 2020, the premiere of the television series "To Catch the Kaidash" took place, in which Khyzhniak played Motrya Kaidash.

Khyzhniak is divorced and has a son.

On 26 June, a promotional video for Donald Trump's controversial bill, the One Big Beautiful Bill Act, appeared on the White House's social media accounts. It features Ukrainian actress Antonina Khizhnyak, star of the series ‘Catching Kaidas.’ The actress was surprised to find herself in the video, as it turned out she had previously modelled for stock photo and video websites.

== Filmography ==
Year	Title	Original title	Role	Notes
2019	Love with Eyes Closed	Кохання з закритими очима	Katya	TV series; episode appearance
2020	To Catch the Kaidash	Спіймати Кайдаша	Motrya Kaidash	TV series; main role
2020–2021	Slid (The Trace)	Слід	Kateryna Chervona	TV series; main role (Police Captain)
2021	The Slavs	Слов'яни	Draga	TV series; episode appearance (voice)
2021	I Will Find a Match for My Beloved	Знайду пару коханому	Nadiya	TV mini-series
2022	Koza Nostra. Mama jide	Коза Ностра. Мама їде	—	Feature film; Ukrainian dubbing voice
2023	I Am Hope	Я — Надія	Olena Pankova	TV series; paramedic role
2023	Those Who Stayed	Перші дні	Julia's mother	TV series; segment "In the Zoo"
2024	Don Juan of Zhashkiv	Дон Жуан із Жашкова	Alina	Feature film
2024	Condo Association Meeting	Збори ОСББ	Yulia	Feature film
2025	When Will You Get Married?	Коли ти вийдеш заміж?	Laura	Feature film
2025	Parent-Teacher Meeting	Батьківські збори	—	Feature film
2026	Relatives	Родичі	Tanika	Feature film; upcoming release
