= Yevhen Halych =

Ukrainian musician (born 1984)

Yevhen Halych Євген Галич
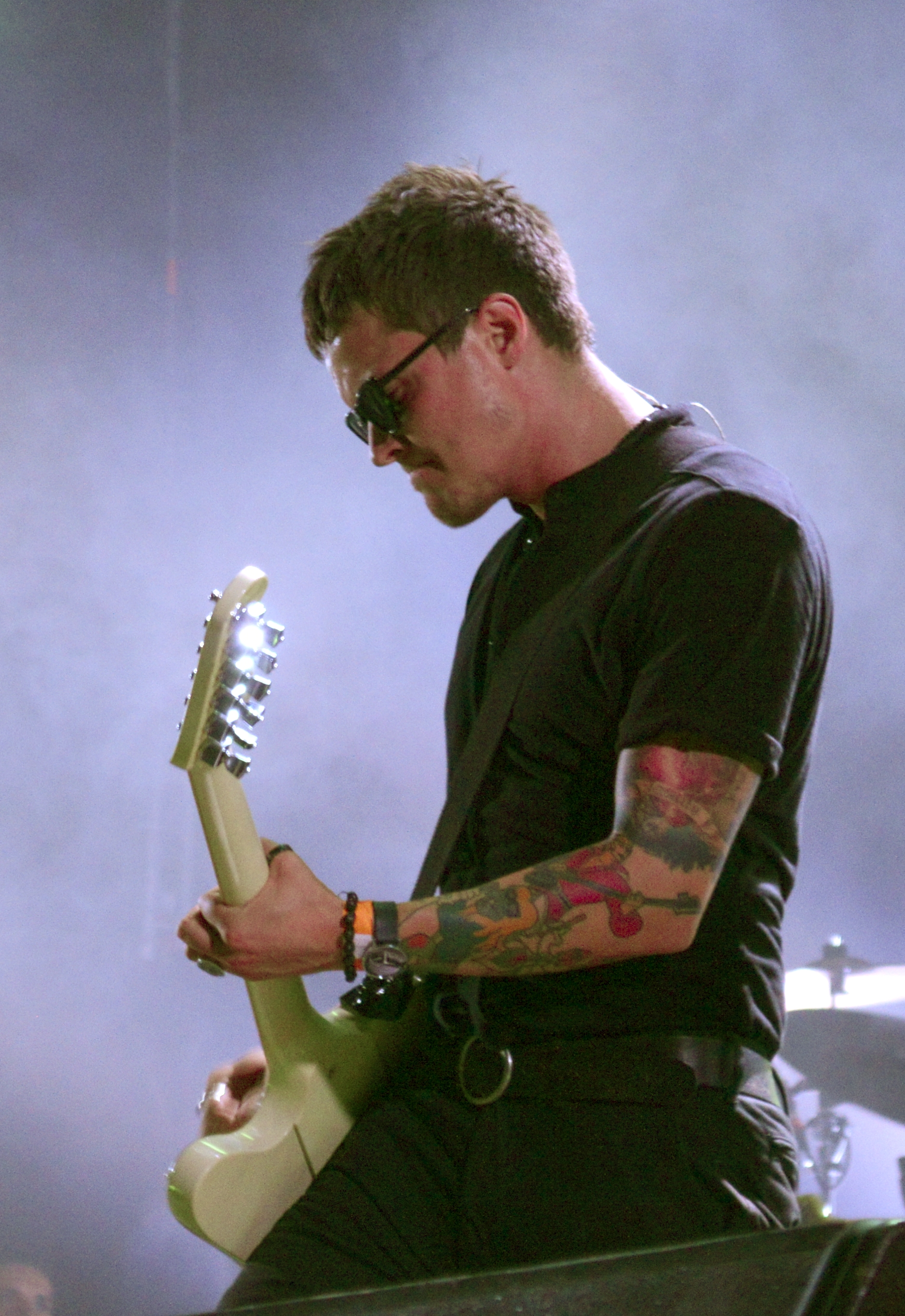
- Yevhen Halych at the 2018 MRPL City Festival

Background information
- Born: 29 April 1984 (age 41); Bila Tserkva, Kyiv Oblast, Ukrainian SSR, Soviet Union (now Ukraine)
- Origin: Ukraine
- Genres: pop rock, pop punk
- Occupations: musician, tv host, dj
- Instruments: vocal, electric guitar, acoustic guitar
- Years active: 1999–present
- Website: o-torvald.com

Yevhen Andriiovych Halych (Ukrainian: Євген Андрійович Галич; born 29 April 1984) is a Ukrainian rock musician, TV host, DJ and the frontman of Ukrainian rock band O.Torvald.

== Biography ==
Yevhen Andriiovitch Halych was born in Bila Tserkva, Kyiv Oblast on 29 April 1984, but the first eight years of his life he spent in Kazakhstan, where his father served in the Soviet Army. In 1992 his family, including his brother Andriy, moved to Poltava, where he has lived long since. Yevhen started attending musical classes when he was five years old. In 1994 he met Denys Miziuk, who was his neighbour and who would later become the guitarist of O.Torvald and the best friend of Yevhen Halych. From 1999 to 2005 they played together in the band "Kruty! Pedali", then they started the band O.Torvald.

Halych studied in Poltava Institute of Military Telecommunications (now he is a lieutenant of reserve, engineer of telecommunication systems and networks). During his last years in the institute, he worked on the radio station. While working there he felt that the music was the only thing he wanted to do in his life.

Soon after graduating from the institute in 2006, he and his band moved to Kyiv, where they rented a house. From 2006 to 2010 they lived in that house all together, and it also acted as their studio. At the beginning they did not receive much money from producing music, so everyone worked for other jobs, leaving not much time for music.

In 2008 they recorded their first album "O.Torvald" and the popularity of their band started to increase, especially since 2011. In the past Halych was the only composer and lyrics writer, but now Mykola "DJ Polyarnyk" Rayda, who is a friend and former groupmate of Yevhen, is helping him. Apart from O.Torvald, Yevhen Halych also participates in the band "NUDLY" with rapper Andriy Shostakov.

While living in Kyiv, Yevhen worked for a number of television channels, including the music TV-channel M1 (at the invitation of Oleksandr Asaulyuk), entertainment TV-channel NLO TV and, from 2018, a channel playing alternative music called Megogo Live.

In addition to his television work, Yevhen also worked for the radio station "Prosto Radi.O". He stated about his work on the radio:

I worked on radio yet back in Poltava. Being a radio host was considered extremely cool, so cool, that even all problems in institute, with traffic policemen and with city administration, were resolved by passing greetings to a wife or mother-in-law on the radio. Airing in the morning means waking up early, which can seem hell for much people. But I am a lark, so such regime is okay for me.

Yevhen Halych has a wife, Valeriya, who gave birth to a daughter in 2013. Yevhen dedicated a song "Нас двоє" ("Two of us") to his wife. She also took part in several videos of O.Torvald.

In April 2022, following the Russian invasion of Ukraine, Halych joined the Armed Forces of Ukraine.

== Participation in Eurovision ==
On 25 February 2017, O.Torvald won national selection for Eurovision, so Yevhen Halych represented Ukraine with the song "Time" on Eurovision Song Contest 2017 as a member of O.Torvald.
