= Arsen Mirzoyan =

Ukrainian singer (born 1978)

Arsen Mirzoyan Арсен Мірзоян
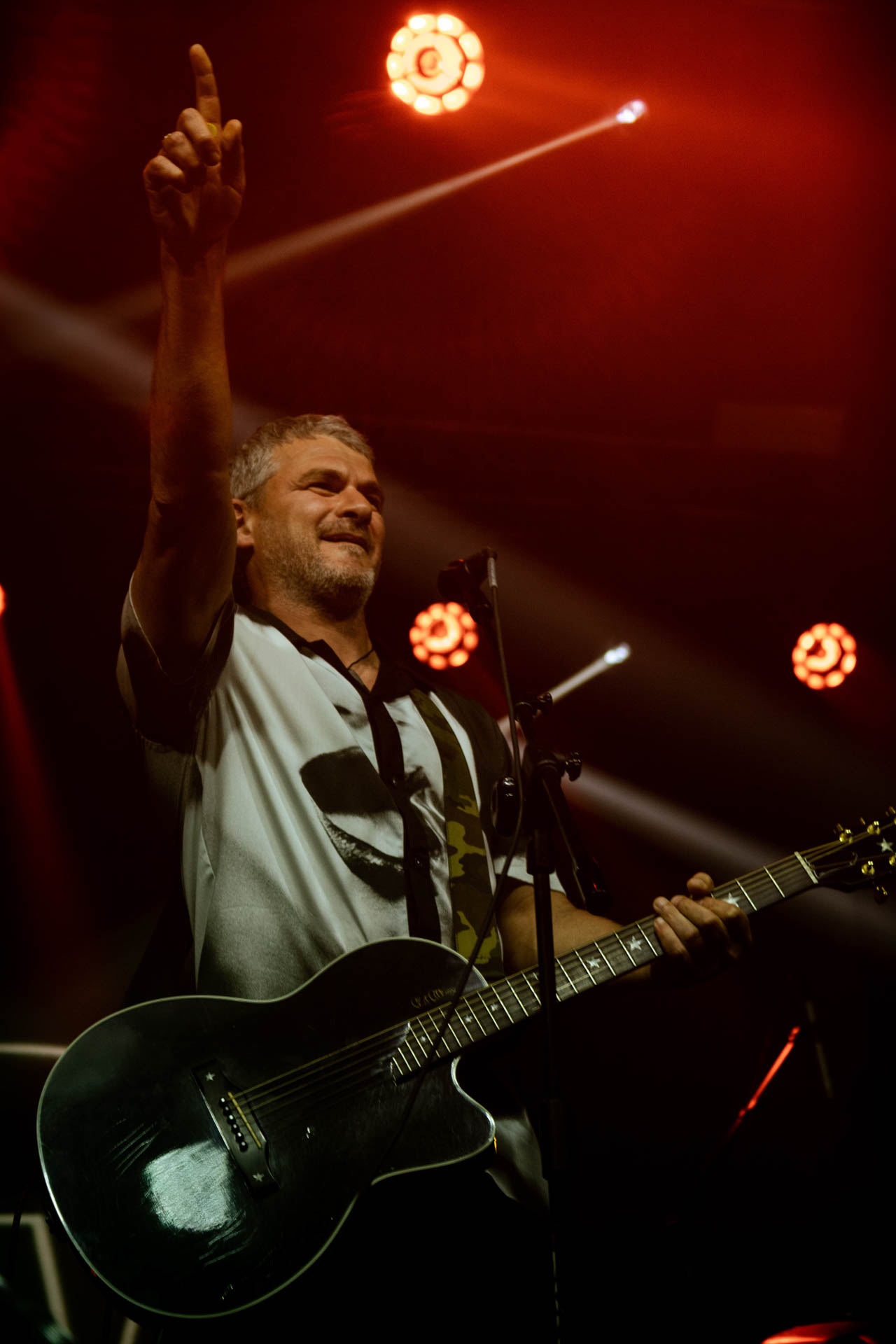
- Arsen Mirzoyan 2022

Background information
- Born: 20 May 1978 (age 47); Zaporizhzhia, Zaporizhzhia Oblast, Ukrainian SSR, Soviet Union
- Genres: alternative Rock, Pop rock, Jazz
- Occupations: singer; songwriter; actor; musician
- Instrument: guitar
- Spouse: Antonina Matvienko (m. 2017)

Arsen Romanovich Mirzoyan (Ukrainian: Арсен Романович Мірзоян; born 20 May 1978), is a Ukrainian singer and songwriter. He was declared "Merited Artist of Ukraine" in 2020 and awarded the "Order of Merit, 3rd class" in 2022.

== Biography ==
Arsen Mirzoyan was born of Armenian descent in Zaporizhzhia, Ukraine in 1978 and graduated from school in 1995. During his years in school, he also took part in concerts and wrote poems, some of which were later used in his songs. However, he had no formal musical education, and he went on to qualify as a non-ferrous metallurgy engineer from the Engineering Institute of Zaporizhzhia National University. He then worked in Zaporizhzhia, first for aircraft engine manufacturer Motor Sich and then in the machine shop of steel maker Zaporizhstal, where he worked for twelve years as site foreman.

== Musical career ==
In 1998, his friends invited him to join their rock band, and this evolved into the band "Totem", whose composition was somewhat fluid. Out of this, Mirzoyan established a band called "Baburka", which performed at festivals such as "Pearls of the Season" and "Chervona Ruta", where he met Alexander Polozhinsky, leader of the band "Tartak". Polozhinsky hosted a TV programme on the TNT-Russia channel called Fresh Blood which featured new young talents, and he invited "Baburka" to take part.

In 2000, Mirzoyan became deaf in his left ear, and in 2004 he became completely deaf. It was only after doctors used prosthetics to regain some hearing that his musical career could continue.

In 2008 he performed with the "Tartak" band at the festival "Tavria Games" at the invitation of Polozhinsky. In the same year, he reached the final of "Laughter without Rules" on the TNT-Russia channel and gained sixth place.

2011 was an important year for Mirzoyan. He took part in the vocal TV competition Holos Krainy (Voice of the Country) on Ukrainian TV channel "1+1", as a springboard for his musical career. He gained fourth place, and also became friends with one of the other finalists, Antonina Matvienko, daughter of Ukrainian singer Nina Matviienko.

After the semi-finals, he signed a 5-year contract with Universal Music regarding the song "Night". Then on 30 November his debut album "Ґудзики" (Buttons) was released, with ten solo songs plus an additional track "Івана Купала" ("Ivan Kupala") performed as a duet with Antonina Matvienko. This was followed in 2013 by the album "Незручні ліжка" (Uncomfortable Beds) under producer Vitaly Telezin. Further albums were released in subsequent years, and in 2016 he released a compilation album of his most popular songs, simply titled Arsen Mirzoyan.

In 2017, he took part in the Ukrainian national selection for the Eurovision Song Contest and reached the semi-finals with the song "Geraldina", which he wrote together with Paul Manondiz, dedicated to Geraldine Chaplin, daughter of the silent film actor Charlie Chaplin. In the same year, he released the album "Слова і Ноти" (Words and Notes).

In 2018, he undertook a tribute tour for Vladimir Vysotsky (1938–1980), an influential Soviet singer-songwriter, poet and actor who would have been 80 that year. Mirzoyan says he started learning Vysotsky songs at the age of five.

Two more albums followed: "Інгредієнт" (Ingredient) in 2019 and "Монархія" (Monarchy) in 2021, which included a duet with his 5-year-old daughter Nina. In 2020 he was declared "Merited Artist of Ukraine" and then in 2022 he was awarded the "Order of Merit, 3rd class" in 2022.

After the Russian invasion of Ukraine in February 2022, Mirzoyan wrote his song "My Country" during military service in the battle for Kyiv, encouraging people to stay in Ukraine and fight back. He said, "'My Country' is about my decision to stay and fight. I wanted to strengthen the feelings for those who hesitated to remain or flee. I wanted to support those who decided to stay in Kyiv." Mirzoyan works with the Zaporuka Charitable Foundation, and while humanitarian aid is being unloaded he gives impromptu concerts for the troops. On 24 August 2022, the Independence Day of Ukraine, Mirzoyan together with his wife and their daughter Nina took part in a special online concert on the EU Delegation to Ukraine's Facebook page.

== Discography – albums ==
- 2011 – "Ґудзики" (Buttons)
- 2013 – "Незручні ліжка" (Uncomfortable Beds)
- 2015 – "Ніч" (Night)
- 2016 – "Паперовий сніг" (Paper Snow)
- 2017 – "Слова і Ноти" (Words and Notes)
- 2019 – "Інгредієнт" (Ingredient)
- 2021 – "Монархія" (Monarchy)

== Personal ==
Mirzoyan has two sons, Vlad and Artem, with his first wife Anna. However, he became friends with Antonina Matvienko at Holos Krainy in 2011, and the relationship developed such that he filed for divorce from Anna at the end of 2013. Mirzoyan and Matvienko had a daughter Nina (born 15 January 2016) and were married on 15 June 2017. He maintains a warm relationship with his sons.
