= The Ugliest Pilgrim =

Short story by American writer Doris Betts

- Short story by Doris Betts
- Country: United States
- Language: English

Publication
- Published in: Red Clay Reader
- Media type: Short story
- Publication date: 1969

"The Ugliest Pilgrim" is a southern gothic short story by American writer Doris Betts.

== Publication ==
The story was first published in volume 6 of the Red Clay Reader, an annual magazine focusing on the work of southern authors and artists. It was collected in Betts's 1973 short story collection Beasts of the Southern Wild and Other Stories, which was a finalist for the National Book Award.

== Synopsis ==
The story follows Violet Karl, a disfigured woman in her late twenties who travels by bus from her home in Spruce Pine, North Carolina to Tulsa, Oklahoma in the hopes of being healed by a televangelist.

== Adaptations ==
The first adaption of "The Ugliest Pilgrim" was a 1981 film titled Violet. The short film was directed by Shelley Levinson and starring Didi Conn. It won the Oscar for Best Live Action Short Film in 1982.

A musical adaption, also titled Violet, was made with music by Jeanine Tesori and libretto by Brian Crawley. The musical premiered Off-Broadway in 1997 and won the Drama Critics' Circle Award and Lucille Lortel Award for Best Musical.
