= Two Colours =

Two Colours or Two Colors may refer to:

- "Two Colours", a 1964 folk song composed by Oleksandr Bilash with lyrics by Dmytro Pavlychko
- Two Colors, a 1989 album by Kvitka Cisyk, and its title track
- Two Colours (EP), by Feeder, 1995
- Twocolors, a German electronic music duo

== See also ==
- Bicolor (disambiguation)
- Two-color system of projection
