= Beasts of the Southern Wild and Other Stories =

1973 short story collection by Doris Betts

- First edition (publ. Harper & Row)
- Author: Doris Betts
- Language: English
- Publisher: Harper & Row
- Publication date: 1973
- ISBN: 0-06-010321-3 (first edition)
- Dewey Decimal: 813.54
- LC Class: PZ4.B565 Be

Beasts of the Southern Wild and Other Stories is a 1973 collection of short stories by Doris Betts. The collection was nominated for a 1974 National Book Award.

The story "The Ugliest Pilgrim" was adapted into the short film “Violet,” which won Best Live Action Short at the 54th Academy Awards. It was later adapted into the musical Violet.

The title story "Beasts of the Southern Wild" was originally published in The Carolina Quarterly in 1973. The title derives from the William Blake poem "The Little Black Boy." It is about an unhappily married woman named Carol who fantasizes she has been chosen as a concubine by Sam Porter, the provost of New African University.

== Stories ==
- The Ugliest Pilgrim
- Hitchiker
- The Mother-in-Law
- Beasts of the Southern Wild
- Burning the Bed
- Still Life with Fruit
- The Glory of his Nostrils
- The Spider Gardens of Madagascar
- Benson Watts is Dead and in Virginia
