= D. bicolor =

D. bicolor may refer to:

- Dendrocygna bicolor, the fulvous whistling duck, a whistling duck species which breeds across the world's tropical regions in much of Central and South America, Sub-Saharan Africa, the Indian subcontinent and the Gulf Coast of the United States
- Drosera bicolor, an erect perennial tuberous plant species endemic to Western Australia
- Ducula bicolor, the pied imperial-pigeon, a relatively large pigeon species found in Southeast Asia

== See also ==
- Bi-color (disambiguation)
