= Two Colors =

1989 album by Kvitka Cisyk

Kvitka, Two Colors

Studio album by Kvitka Cisyk
- Released: 1989
- Recorded: Spring 1989
- Studio: Clinton Recording Studios
- Genre: folk
- Length: 51:27
- Label: KMC Records
- Producer: E. Rak., J. Cortner

Kvitka Cisyk chronology
Kvitka, Songs of Ukraine (1980)	Kvitka, Two Colors (1989)

Two Colors (Ukrainian: Два Кольори, romanized: Dva Kolory) is a 1989 Ukrainian symphonic folk album by Kvitka Cisyk. The title comes from one of the songs, Two Colours.

== Track listing ==
No.	Title	Writer(s)	Length
1.	"Де ти тепер (Where are You Now?)"	Ihor Shamo, Dmytro Lutsenko	3:36
2.	"Черемшина (Spring's Song)"	Vasyl Mykhailiuk, Mykola Yuriichuk	4:15
3.	"Коломийка (A Dance)"		2:36
4.	"Тече річка (The River Flows)"		3:06
5.	"При ватрі (A Campfire at Dusk)"	Yurii Starosolskyi, Yurii Piasetskyi	3:08
6.	"Я піду в далекі гори (I Will Go to the Distant Hills)"	Volodymyr Ivasyuk	6:17
7.	"Ой заграли музики (Musicians are Playing)"		3:04
8.	"Два кольори (Two Colours)"	Oleksandr Bilash, Dmytro Pavlychko	5:11
9.	"Кохання (Love)"	Ihor Bilozir, Petro Zapotichnyi	4:17
10.	"Верше, мій верше (Poem, My Poem)"		5:01
11.	"Колись дівчино мила (The Nightingale)"		2:00
12.	"І снилося (A Young Girl's Dream)"		1:24
13.	"На городі керниченька (The Well)"		0:43
14.	"Ой не світи місяченьку (A Song to the Moon)"		2:05
15.	"Журавлі (The Cranes are Flying)"	Lev Lepky, Bohdan Lepky	4:15

== Personnel ==
- All vocals by: Kvitka Cisyk
- Classical and Steel String guitars: S.Scharf
- Solo Piano: Maria Cisyk
- drums: Ronnie Zito
- Acoustic bass: John Beal
- Piano and Celeste: Kenneth Ascher, Pat Rebillot
- Harp: Margaret Ross
- Percussion: Sue Evans
- synthesizers: J.Lawrence
- Clarinet Solo: Eddie Daniels
- Concertmaster: M.Ellen
- Violins: A.Ajemian etc.
- Violas: J.Barber etc.
- Cello: E.Moye etc.
- Executive producer: Ed Rakowicz
- Produced by: Ed Rakowicz, Jack Cortner
- Arranged and Conducted by: Jack Cortner
- Digitally Recorded and Mixed by: Ed Rakowicz At Clinton Recording Studios, NYC
- Album Coordinator: D.Mounsey
- DDD. Manufactured in the United States. ISBN KMCD 1002
