= Cheremshyna =

1965 Ukrainian song by Vasyl Mykhailyuk

Song by Dmytro Hnatyuk
- Language: Ukrainian
- Released: 1965
- Genre: Romance
- Composer: Vasyl Mykhailyuk
- Lyricist: Mykola Yuriychuk

"Cheremshyna" (Ukrainian: «Черемшина», Bird Cherry) is a Ukrainian-language song-romance. The song was first released in 1965, with music by Vasyl Mykhailyuk and lyrics by Mykola Yuriychuk. The first performer of the song was Dmytro Hnatyuk. The lyrics of the song mention Cheremosh River.

== Creation ==
Mykola Yuriychuk previously worked at mining pits in Jezkazgan, Kazakhstan, but after receiving disability in 1964 returned home to Bukovinian city of Vashkivtsi. At home Yuriychuk wrote lyrics to the future song without any prior expectations and gave them away to his friend Mykhailyuk as if those lyrics might be useful someday. The lyrics were put away in a box and were left there for year, when in 1965 after taking walk in meadows Mykhailyuk came up with a melody. He ran to his house, sat down at his piano, played the melody out, and then quickly wrote down notes on a paper.

== Performances ==
Vasyl Mykhailyuk mentioned that in 1965 he with chorus traveled to Kyiv to celebrate the 25th anniversary of the integration of Northern Bukovina into Ukraine and there Dmytro Hnatiuk heard the song. He "gave wings" to the song and thaks to him it flew around the world.

Among other performers of the song are Sofia Rotaru, Taisia Povaliy (Ukraine), Kvitka Cisyk (United States), Stepan Pasicznyk (UK), Evdokimov Yaroslav Alexandrovich (Russia), Tatiana Bulanova, Aleksandr Malinin (Russia), and many others.

The song was included in Kvitka Cisyk's album Two Colors.

== Popular use ==
According to recollections of FC Karpaty Lviv players, the song was inspiring when it sounded over the stadium in Moscow in 1969.

A black parody of the song exists, describing the fight of the Ukrainian rebels led by Stepan Bandera against "Muscovites".
