= Doris Betts =

American writer

Doris Betts (June 4, 1932 – April 21, 2012) was an American short story writer, novelist, essayist and Alumni Distinguished Professor Emerita at University of North Carolina at Chapel Hill. She was the author of three short story collections and six novels.

== Profile ==
Betts was born in Statesville, North Carolina in 1932, the only child of Mary Ellen and William Elmore. In 1950 she graduated from Statesville High School, and attended the University of North Carolina at Greensboro. While an undergraduate student she married then law student Lowry Betts, who later became a district judge in Chatham and Orange Counties, North Carolina; they had three children. She won the Mademoiselle College Fiction contest during her sophomore year (1953) for the story "Mr. Shawn and Father Scott".

After working as a newspaper reporter for a number of years, Betts joined the faculty of the University of North Carolina at Chapel Hill in 1966. She received the UNC Putnam Book Prize in 1954 for her first book, The Gentle Insurrection, three Sir Walter Raleigh Awards (1958, 1965, and 1973) for the best fiction books by a North Carolinian, a Guggenheim Fellowship in Creative Writing (1958–1959), the North Carolina Award and Medal (1975), the Distinguished Service Award for Women (Chi Omega), and the John Dos Passos Award from Longwood College. She has also written articles for professional journals, lectured at writers' conferences, and delivered speeches on major college campuses. In 1980 she was named a UNC Alumni Distinguished Professor of English. She received the Tanner Award for distinguished undergraduate teaching in 1973 and the Katherine Carmichael Teaching Award in 1980. She corresponded with literary critic M. Bernetta Quinn.

Violet, a film adaptation of "The Ugliest Pilgrim", her most widely reprinted short story, won Best Live Action Short at the 54th Academy Awards. In 1998, it was the basis of a musical, also named Violet, which won the New York Drama Critics Circle Award.

Coinciding with her retirement from teaching, the Doris Betts Distinguished Professor in Creative Writing, an endowed chair, was established in her honor. She served as the Chancellor of the Fellowship of Southern Writers.

Producer, Nancy Bevins, adapted Betts's short story, "This is the Only Time I'll Tell It" into a short film in 1998. Awarded a Humanities Council Grant, the film premiered at Salem College in Winston-Salem, North Carolina with Betts in attendance.

Betts died at her Pittsboro, North Carolina home of lung cancer on April 21, 2012, aged 79.

== Awards ==
- G.P. Putnam-U.N.C. Booklength Fiction prize, 1954
- Sir Walter Raleigh Best Fiction by Carolinian award, 1957, for Tall Houses in Winter; 1965, for Scarlet Thread
- Guggenheim Fellow 1958
- North Carolina Medal, 1975, for literature
- Parker award, 1982–1985, for literary achievement
- John dos Passos award, 1983
- American Academy of Arts and Letters Medal of Merit, 1989, for short story
- Academy Award, for Violet.

== Works ==
=== Short fiction collections ===
- The Gentle Insurrection (1954)
- The Astronomer and Other Stories (1966)
- Beasts of the Southern Wild and Other Stories (1973)

=== Novels ===
- Tall Houses in Winter (1957)
- The Scarlet Thread (1965)
- The River to Pickle Beach (1972)
- Heading West: A Novel (1981)
- Souls Raised from the Dead (1994)
- The Sharp Teeth of Love (1998)

=== Short stories ===
Title	Publication	Collected in
"The Gentle Insurrection" aka "Yesterday Was the Last Time"	Coraddi (Summer 1952)	The Gentle Insurrection
"Birds of a Feather"	Carolina Quarterly 6.2 (Winter 1953)	-
"The Sword"	Coraddi (Winter 1953)	The Gentle Insurrection
"Mr. Shawn and Father Scott"	Mademoiselle (August 1953)	The Gentle Insurrection
"The Sympathetic Visitor"	Mademoiselle (March 1954)	The Gentle Insurrection
"A Mark of Distinction"	The Gentle Insurrection (April 1954)	The Gentle Insurrection
"A Sense of Humor"	The Gentle Insurrection (April 1954)	The Gentle Insurrection
"Family Album"	The Gentle Insurrection (April 1954)	The Gentle Insurrection
"Serpents and Doves"	The Gentle Insurrection (April 1954)	The Gentle Insurrection
"Miss Parker Possessed"	The Gentle Insurrection (April 1954)	The Gentle Insurrection
"Child So Fair"	The Gentle Insurrection (April 1954)	The Gentle Insurrection
"The Very Old Are Beautiful"	The Gentle Insurrection (April 1954)	The Gentle Insurrection
"The End of Henry Fribble"	The Gentle Insurrection (April 1954)	The Gentle Insurrection
"I Can Understand Pilate"	Mademoiselle (December 1954)	-
"The August Tree"	Carolina Quarterly 8.1 (Autumn 1955)	-
"The Seventh Day"	Virginia Quarterly Review 31.4 (Autumn 1955)	-
"Clarissa and the Depths"	New Campus Writing 1 (1955)	The Astronomer and Other Stories
"The Proud and Virtuous"	Mademoiselle (1956)	The Astronomer and Other Stories
"The End of Summer"	Carolina Quarterly 10.2 (Spring 1958)	-
"The Silver Houses"	The Wake Forest Student (May 1959)	-
"The Man Who Measured Money"	The Wake Forest Student (May 1959)	-
"The Nicest House on Cedar Drive"	Raleigh News & Observer (September 11, 1960)	-
"One of Those Modern Mothers"	Redbook (June 1961)	-
"What Do They See in Each Other"	Woman's Day (August 1961)	-
"Careful, Sharp Eggs Underfoot"	Rebel Magazine (Spring 1964)	The Astronomer and Other Stories
"The Dead Mule"	Red Clay Reader 1 (1964)	The Astronomer and Other Stories
"The Spies in the Herb House"	The Astronomer and Other Stories (February 1966)	The Astronomer and Other Stories
"The Mandarin"	The Astronomer and Other Stories (February 1966)	The Astronomer and Other Stories
"All That Glistens Isn't Gold"	The Astronomer and Other Stories (February 1966)	The Astronomer and Other Stories
"The Astronomer"	The Astronomer and Other Stories (February 1966)	The Astronomer and Other Stories
"Put Them All Together"	Greensboro Review 4.1 (Winter 1968)	-
"The Bald Pigeon"	Carolina Quarterly 21.1 (Winter 1969)	-
"The Ugliest Pilgrim"	Red Clay Reader 6 (1969)	Beasts of the Southern Wild and Other Stories
"Burning the Bed"	The South Carolina Review 1.2 (May 1969)	Beasts of the Southern Wild and Other Stories
"Necromancer"	Long View Journal 1.3 (Winter 1970)	-
"Still Life With Fruit"	Red Clay Reader 7 (1970)	Beasts of the Southern Wild and Other Stories
"The Glory of His Nostrils"	Appalachian Harvest 1 (1970)	Beasts of the Southern Wild and Other Stories
"The Wrong Day for the Race"	Cairn 6 (Fall 1970)	-
"Beasts of the Southern Wild"	Carolina Quarterly 25.2 (Spring 1973)	Beasts of the Southern Wild and Other Stories
"Benson Watts Is Dead and in Virginia"	The Massachusetts Review 14.2 (Spring 1973)	Beasts of the Southern Wild and Other Stories
"A Love Story"	Cosmopolitan (September 1973)	-
"Hitchhiker"	Beasts of the Southern Wild and Other Stories (October 1973)	Beasts of the Southern Wild and Other Stories
"The Mother-in-Law"	Beasts of the Southern Wild and Other Stories (October 1973)	Beasts of the Southern Wild and Other Stories
"The Spider Gardens of Madagasccar"	Beasts of the Southern Wild and Other Stories (October 1973)	Beasts of the Southern Wild and Other Stories
"This Is the Only Time I'll Tell It"	New Orleans Review 5.3 (1976)	-
"Stepping Westward"*	Mississippi Review 7.2 (Spring 1978)	* Excerpt from Heading West
"The Story of E"	Carolina Quarterly 31.3 (Fall 1979)	-
"The Lost or Stolen Dog"	Oconee Review 1.1 (Fall 1979)	-
"Bringing Down the House"	Redbook (August 1979)	-
"Three Ghosts"	Raleigh News & Observer (March 21, 1999)	-
"Aboveground"	Epoch 50.3 (2001)	-
"In the Last House"	Idaho Review 4 (2002)	-
"The Lawn Ornament"	Epoch 51.2 (2002)	-
"Minding the Graves"	The Southern Review 38.3 (Summer 2002)	-
"Whose Child Is This?"	Christmas in the South: Holiday Stories from the South's Best Writers (2004)	-
"Another Modest Proposal"	Conjunctions 51 (Fall 2008)	-
"The Girl Who Wanted to Be a Horse"	Long Story Short: Flash Fiction by Sixty-Five of North Carolina's Finest Writers (2009)	-
