= P. bicolor =

P. bicolor may refer to:

- Phyllobates bicolor, the black-legged dart frog, a frog species found in the Chocó area in western Colombia
- Phyllomedusa bicolor, a giant leaf frog species found throughout the Amazon Rainforest

== See also ==
- Bi-color (disambiguation)
