= Richard Bernstein =

Richard Bernstein may refer to:

- Richard Bernstein (journalist) (1944–2025), American columnist for The New York Times
- Richard B. Bernstein (1956–2023), American constitutional historian and CCNY lecturer in law and political science
- Richard Barry Bernstein (1923–1990), American chemist
- Richard H. Bernstein (born 1974), American lawyer and Michigan Supreme Court justice; first blind Supreme Court justice in the United States
- Richard J. Bernstein (1932–2022), American philosopher
- Richard K. Bernstein (1934–2025), American physician
- Richard Bernstein (artist) (1939–2002), American artist, illustrated covers of Interview magazine
- Richard Bernstein (bass) (born 1966), American opera singer at the Metropolitan Opera
