= 54th Academy Awards =

- Official poster
- Date: March 29, 1982
- Site: Dorothy Chandler Pavilion; Los Angeles, California, U.S.
- Hosted by: Johnny Carson
- Produced by: Howard W. Koch (Note: Melvin Frank was initially selected as producer of the ceremony, but he withdrew from his position due to health problems and was replaced by Koch.)
- Directed by: Marty Pasetta

Highlights
- Best Picture: Chariots of Fire
- Most awards: Chariots of Fire and Raiders of the Lost Ark (Note: Not counting the non-competitive Special Achievement Award for Raiders of the Lost Ark.) (4)
- Most nominations: Reds (12)

TV in the United States
- Network: ABC
- Duration: 3 hours, 32 minutes
- Ratings: 46.2 million 33.6% (Nielsen ratings)

The 54th Academy Awards ceremony, organized by the Academy of Motion Picture Arts and Sciences (AMPAS), honored films released in 1981 and took place on March 29, 1982, at the Dorothy Chandler Pavilion in Los Angeles. During the ceremony, AMPAS presented Academy Awards (commonly referred to as Oscars) in 22 categories. The ceremony, televised in the United States by ABC, was produced by Howard W. Koch and directed by Marty Pasetta. Comedian and talk show host Johnny Carson hosted the show for the fourth consecutive time.

Chariots of Fire won four awards, including Best Picture. Other winners included Raiders of the Lost Ark with also four awards, On Golden Pond and Reds with three, Arthur with two; and An American Werewolf in London, Close Harmony, Crac, Genocide, Mephisto, and Violet with one. The telecast garnered 46.2 million viewers in the United States.

== Winners and nominees ==
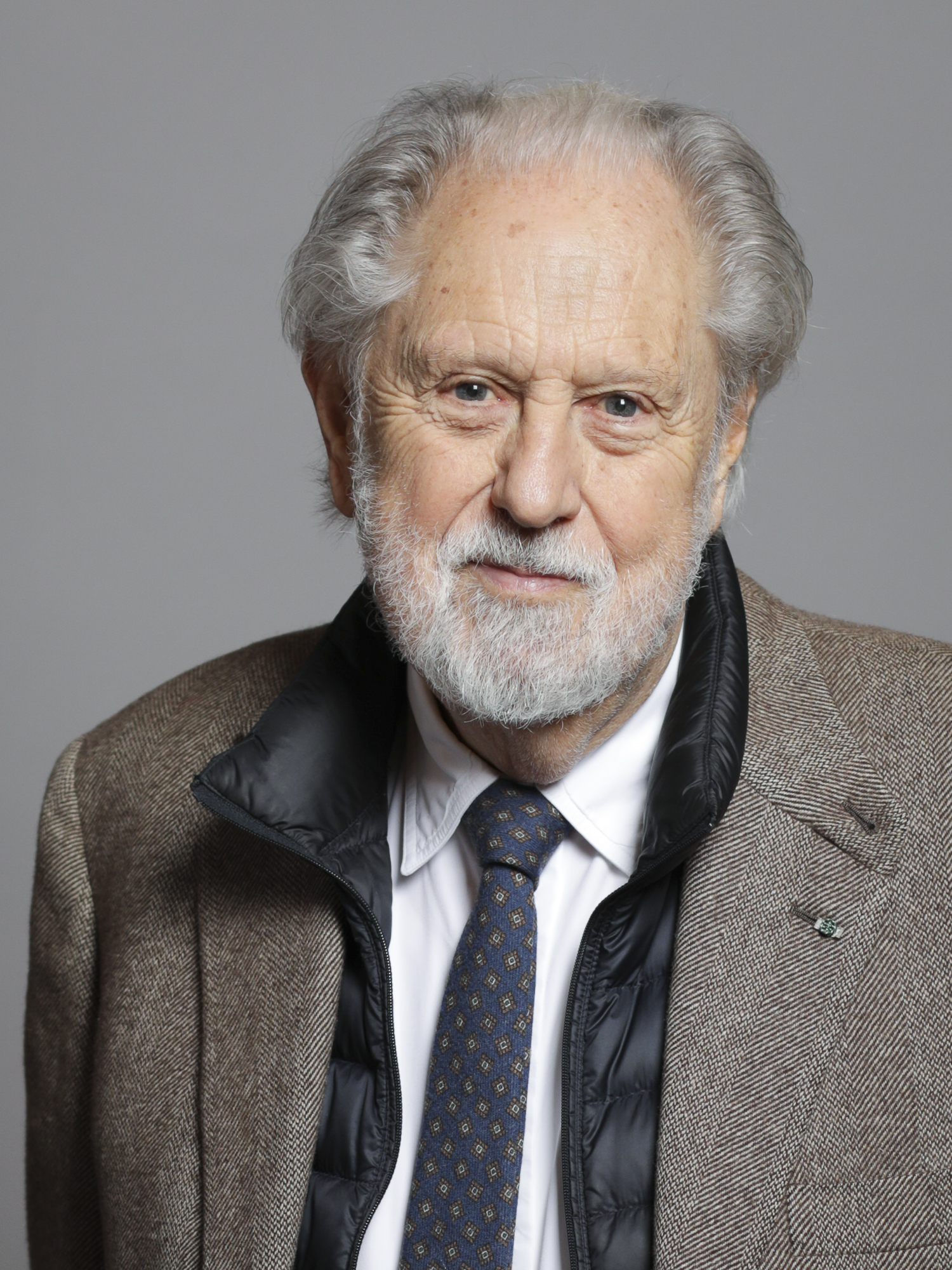
David Puttnam, Best Picture winner

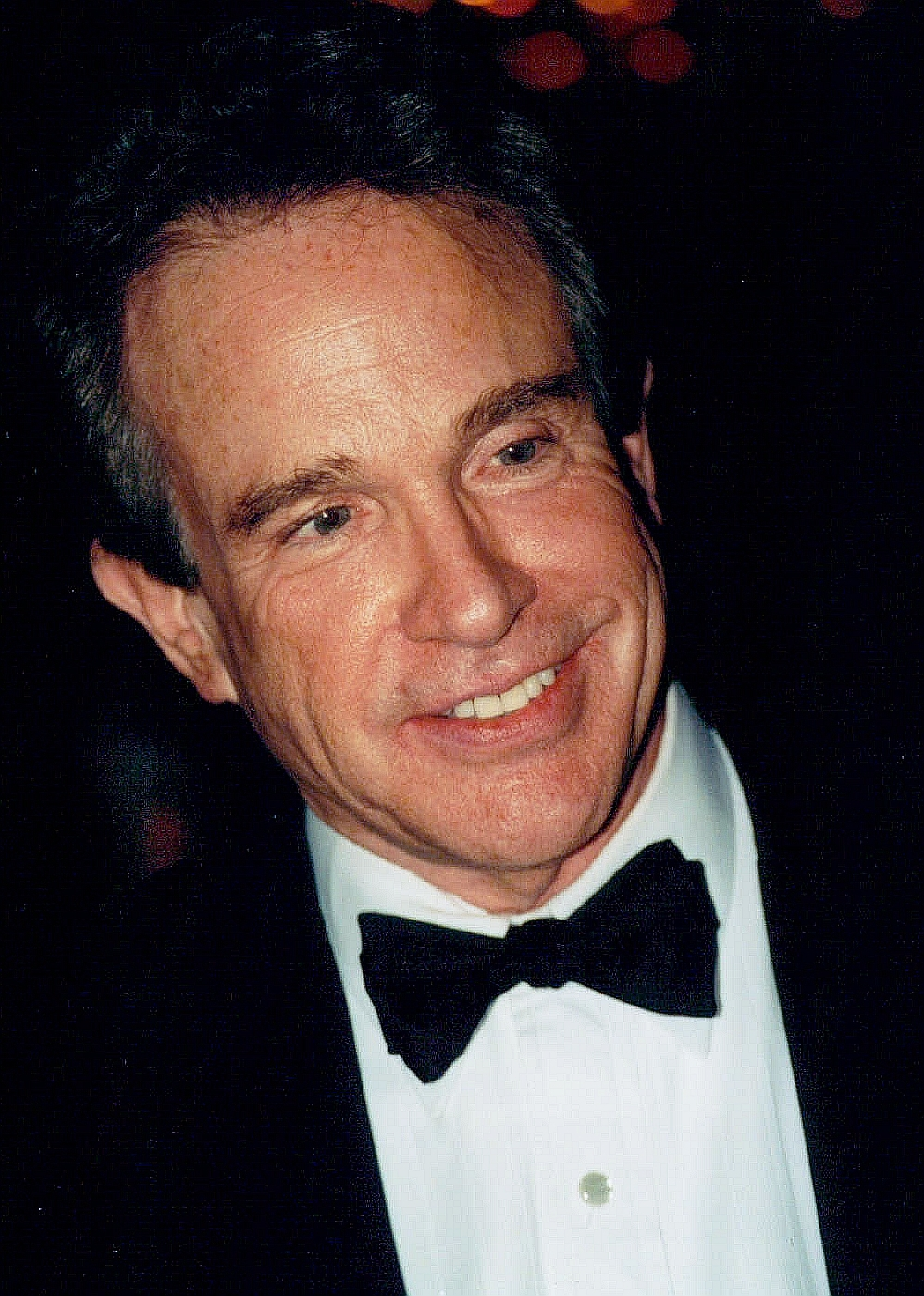
Warren Beatty, Best Director winner

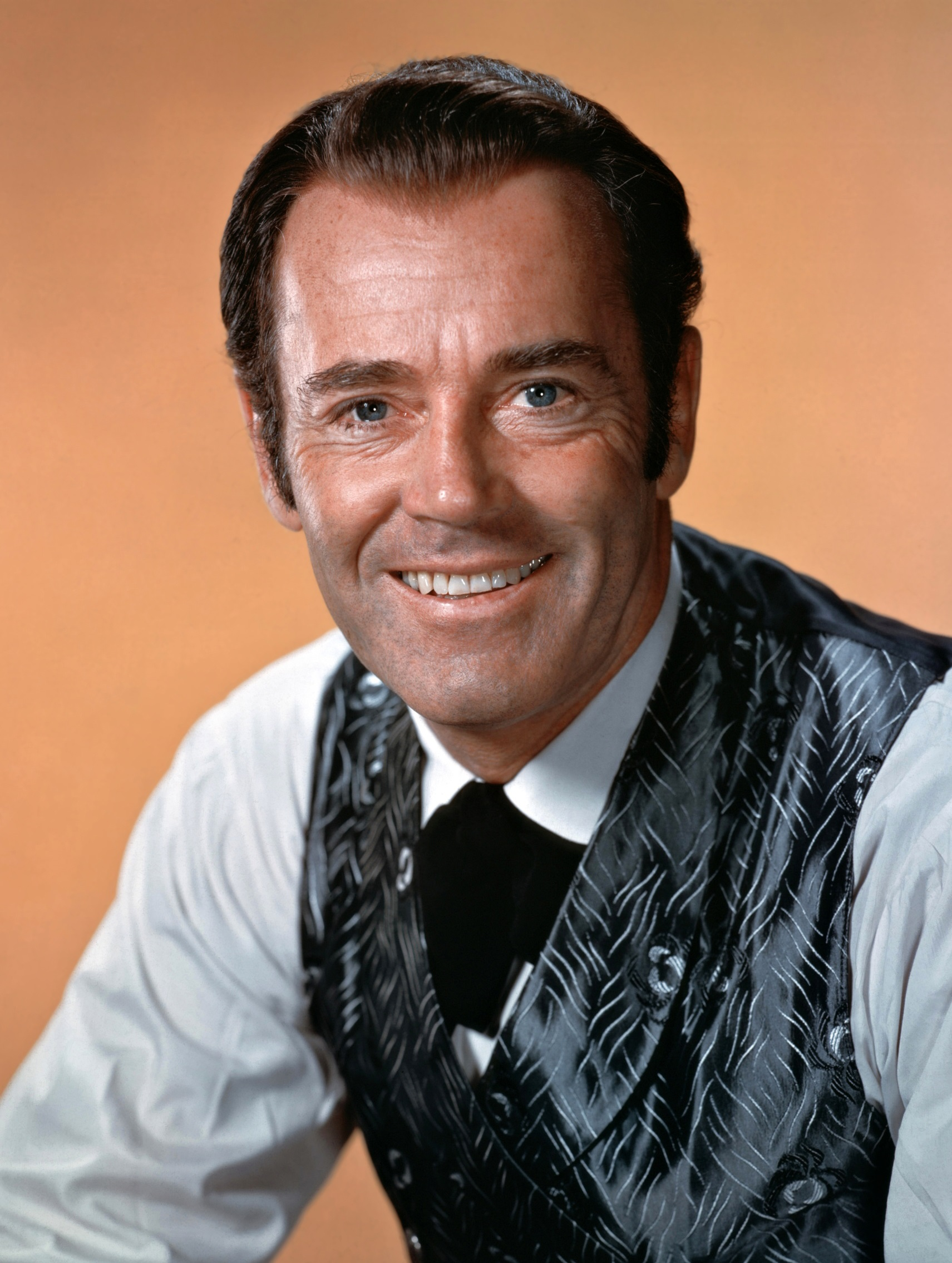
Henry Fonda, Best Actor winner

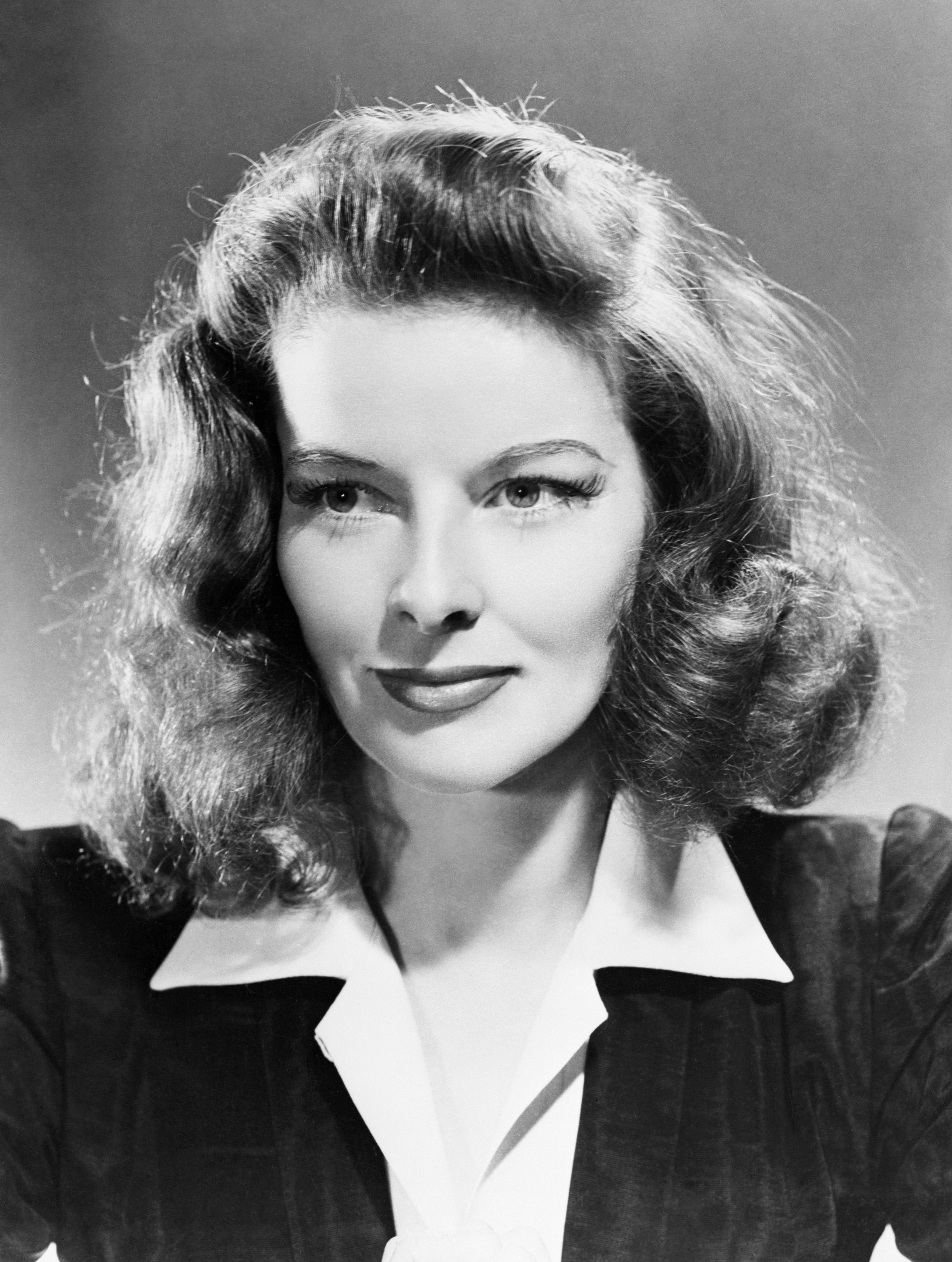
Katharine Hepburn, Best Actress winner

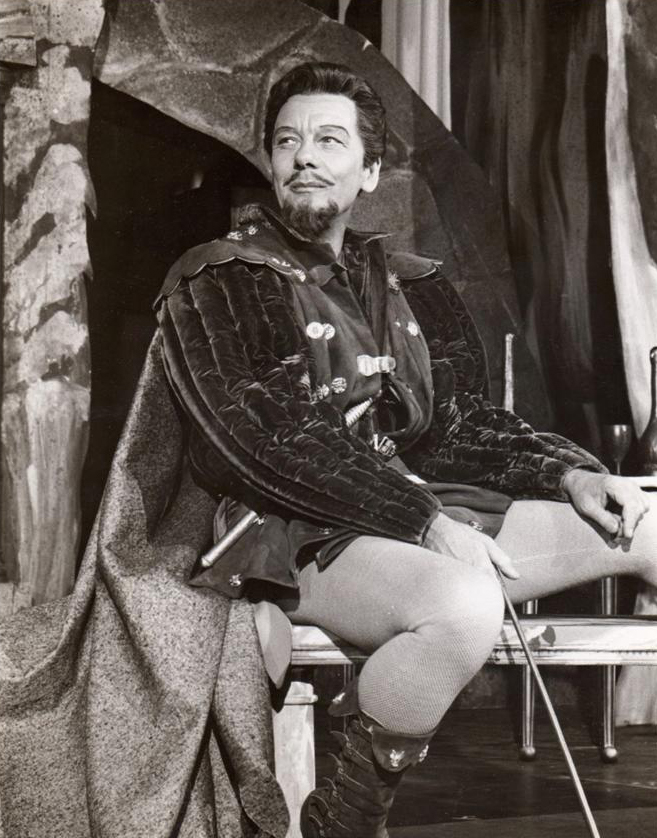
John Gielgud, Best Supporting Actor winner

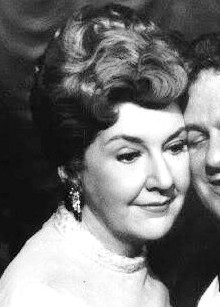
Maureen Stapleton, Best Supporting Actress winner

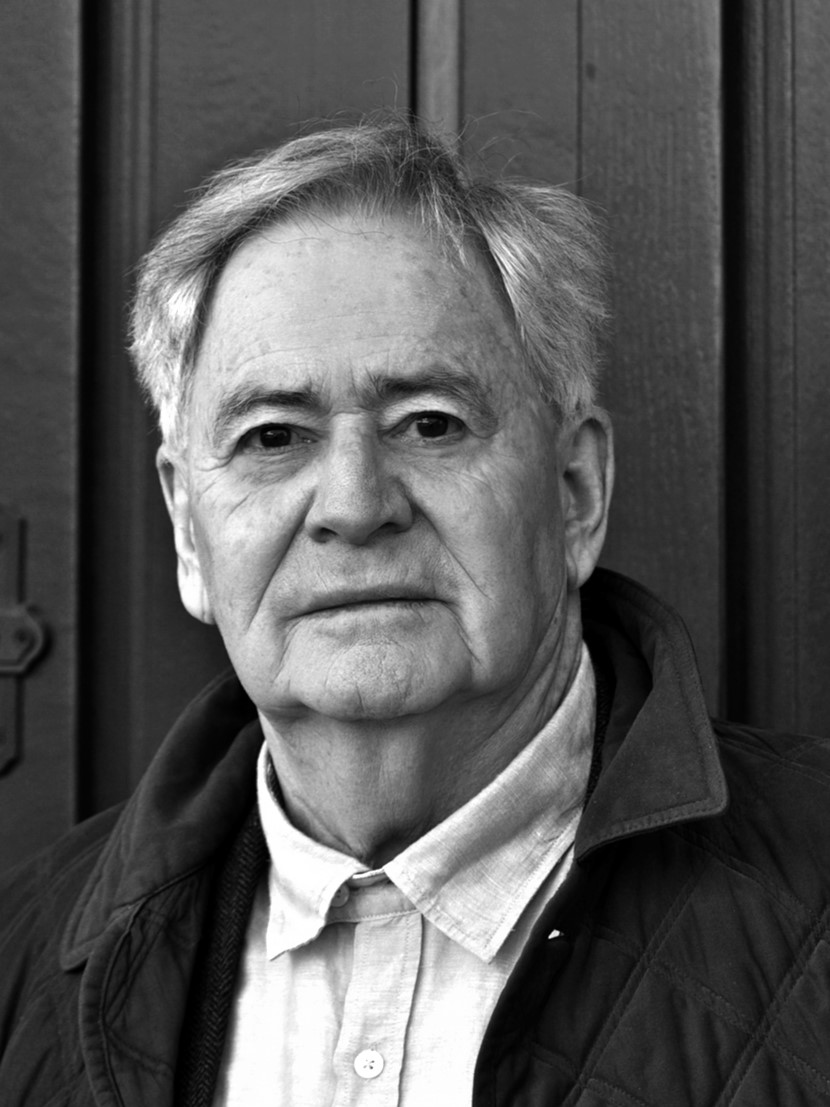
István Szabó, Best Foreign Language Film winner

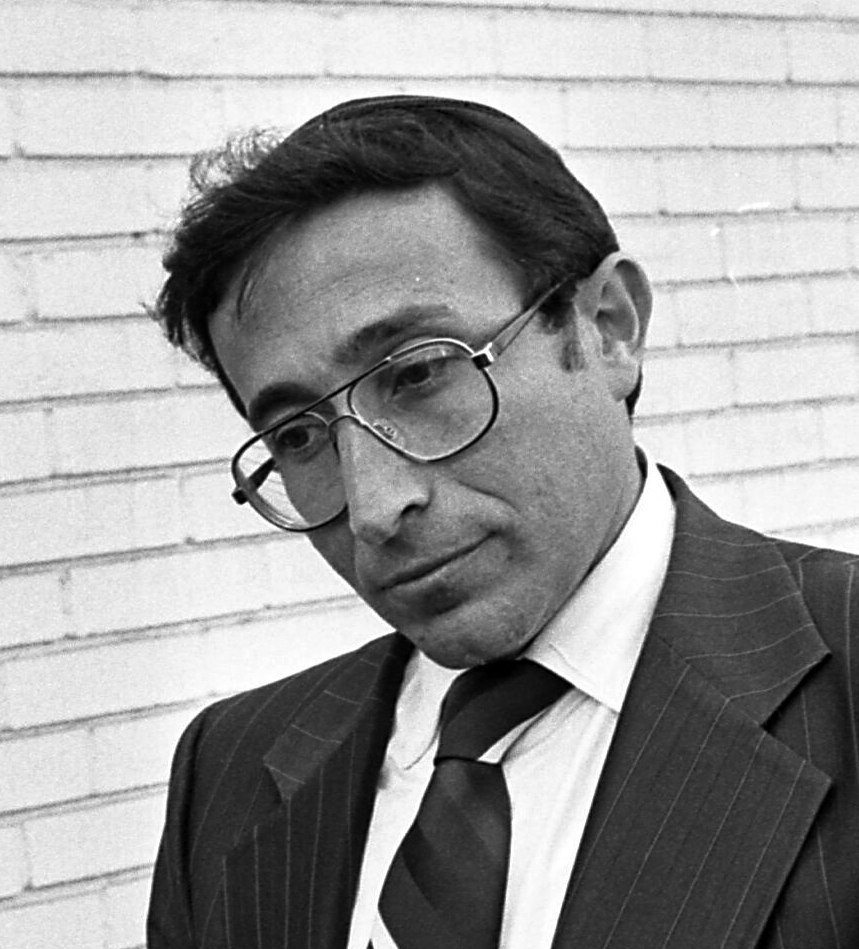
Marvin Hier, Best Documentary Feature winner

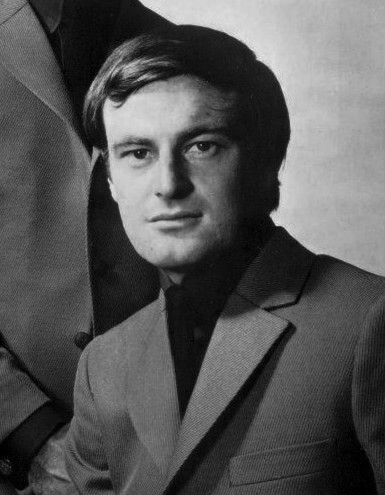
Peter Allen, Best Original Song co-winner

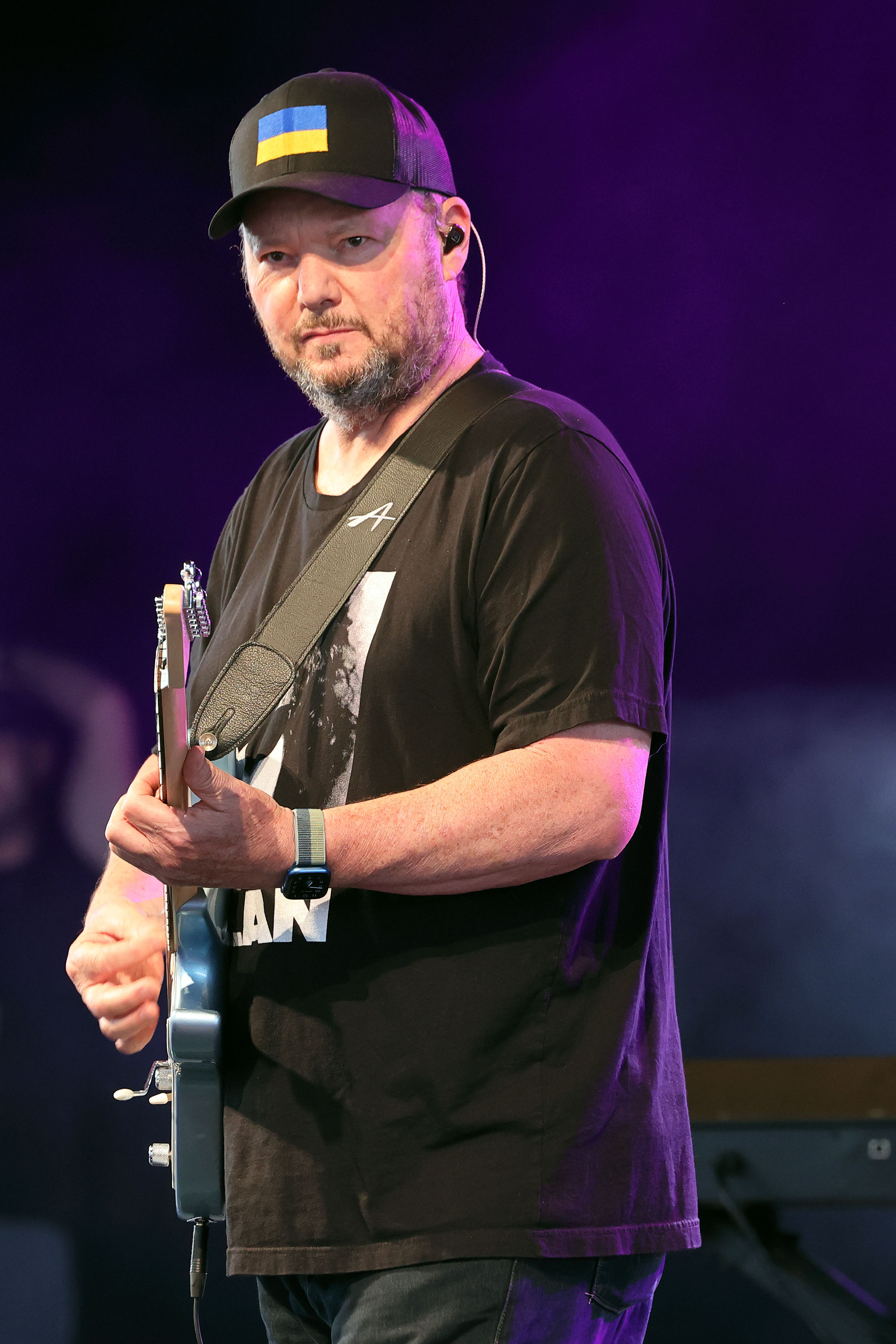
Christopher Cross, Best Original Song co-winner

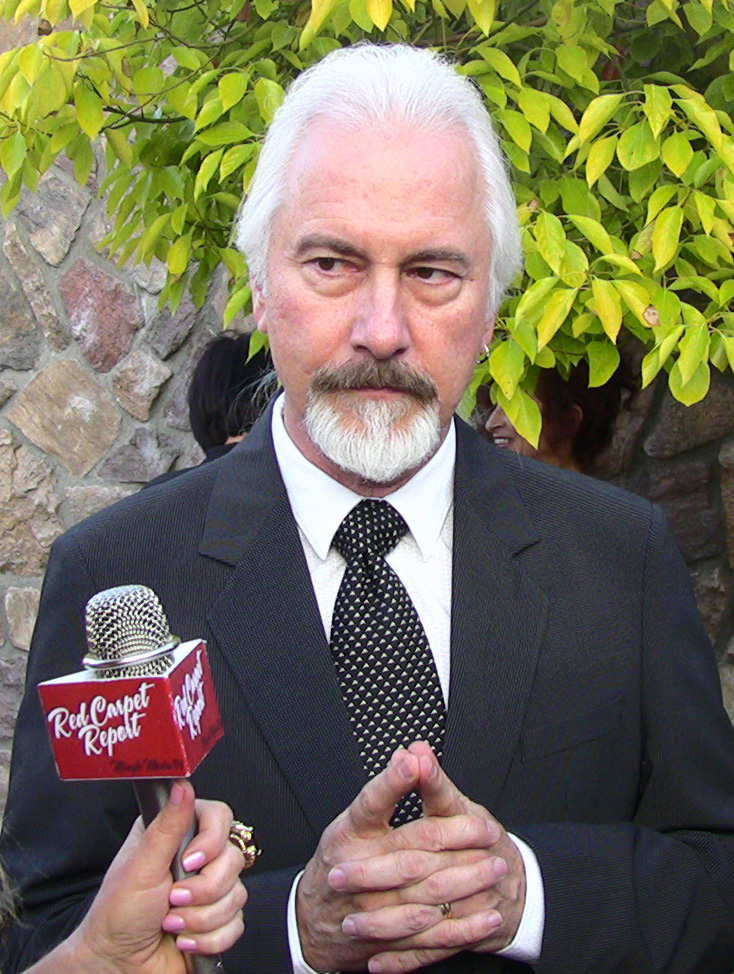
Rick Baker, Best Makeup winner

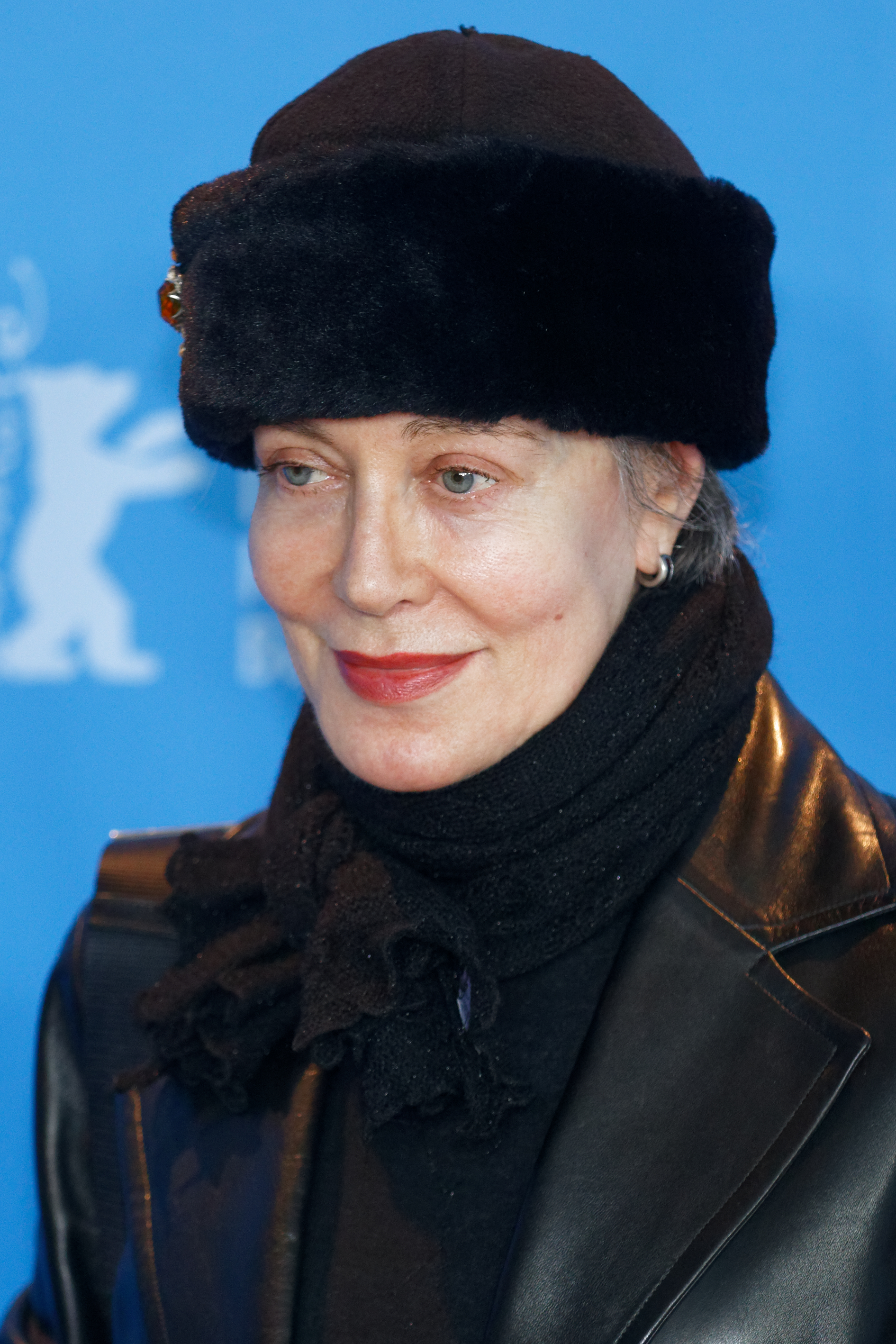
Milena Canonero, Best Costume Design winner

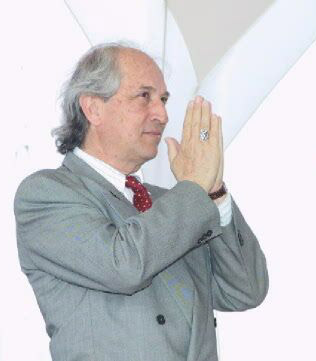
Vittorio Storaro, Best Cinematography winner

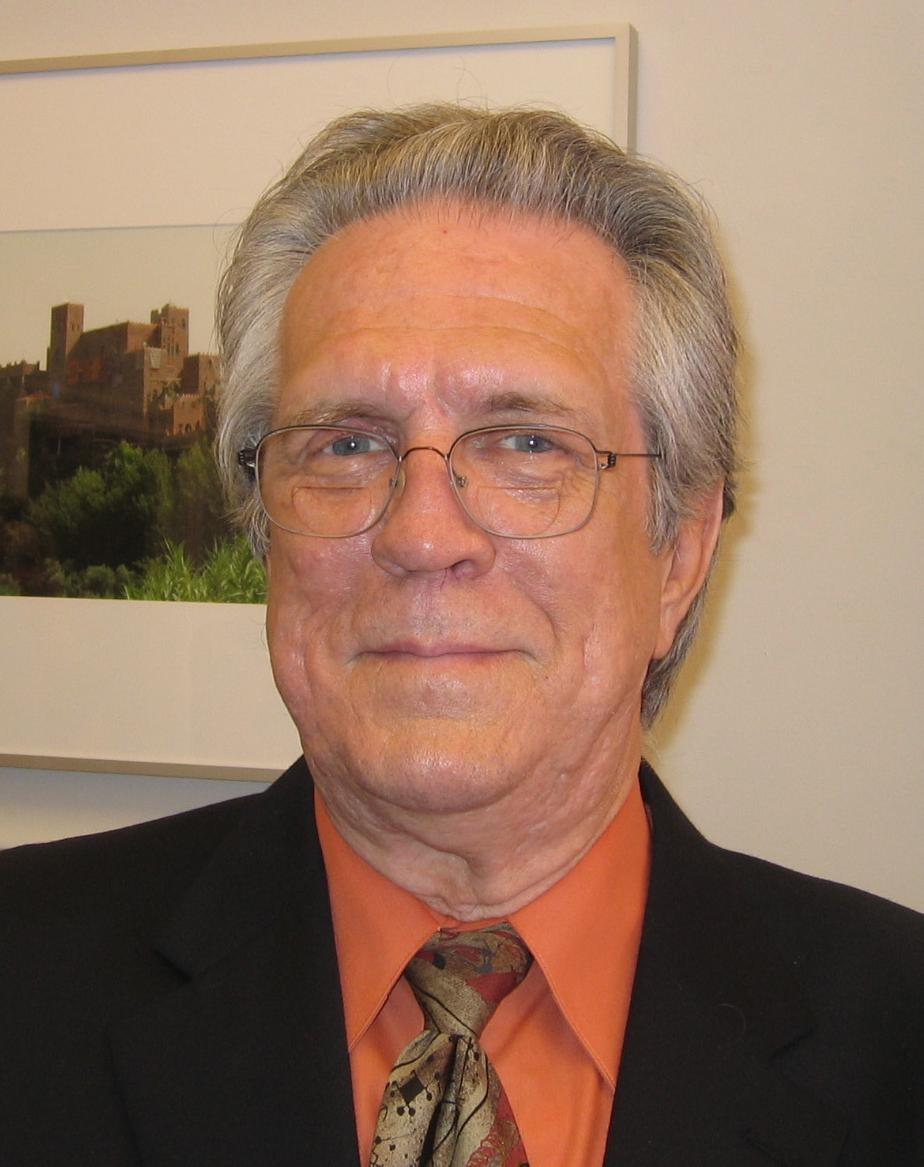
Richard Edlund, Best Visual Effects co-winner

The nominees for the 54th Academy Awards were announced on February 11, 1982, by Academy president Fay Kanin and actor Lloyd Bridges. Reds earned the most nominations with twelve; On Golden Pond came in second with ten. The winners were announced at the awards ceremony on March 29.

Best Director winner Warren Beatty became the first person to earn acting, directing, producing, and screenwriting nominations for the same film for the second time. He previously earned nominations in the same categories for 1978's Heaven Can Wait. On Golden Pond was the fifth film to win both lead acting awards. Best Actress winner Katharine Hepburn became the first and only performer to win four competitive acting Oscars. Furthermore, the 48-year span between her first win for 1933's Morning Glory and her last win for On Golden Pond set the record for the longest span between first and last career Oscar wins.

=== Awards ===
Winners are listed first, highlighted in boldface and indicated with a double dagger (‡).

Table featuring winners and nominees of the 54th Academy Awards
**Best Picture**: **Chariots of Fire – David Puttnam, producer**‡; Atlantic City – Denis Héroux and John Kemeny, producers; On Golden Pond – Bruce Gilbert, producer; Raiders of the Lost Ark – Frank Marshall, producer; Reds – Warren Beatty, producer	**Best Directing**: **Warren Beatty – Reds**‡; Louis Malle – Atlantic City; Hugh Hudson – Chariots of Fire; Mark Rydell – On Golden Pond; Steven Spielberg – Raiders of the Lost Ark
**Best Actor in a Leading Role**: **Henry Fonda – On Golden Pond as Norman Thayer Jr.**‡; Warren Beatty – Reds as John Silas "Jack" Reed; Burt Lancaster – Atlantic City as Lou Pascal; Dudley Moore – Arthur as Arthur Bach; Paul Newman – Absence of Malice as Michael Gallagher	**Best Actress in a Leading Role**: **Katharine Hepburn – On Golden Pond as Ethel Thayer**‡; Diane Keaton – Reds as Louise Bryant; Marsha Mason – Only When I Laugh as Georgia Hines; Susan Sarandon – Atlantic City as Sally Matthews; Meryl Streep – The French Lieutenant's Woman as Sarah Woodruff/Anna
**Best Actor in a Supporting Role**: **John Gielgud – Arthur as Hobson**‡; James Coco – Only When I Laugh as Jimmy Perrino; Ian Holm – Chariots of Fire as Sam Mussabini; Jack Nicholson – Reds as Eugene O'Neill; Howard E. Rollins Jr. – Ragtime as Coalhouse Walker Jr.	**Best Actress in a Supporting Role**: **Maureen Stapleton – Reds as Emma Goldman**‡; Melinda Dillon – Absence of Malice as Teresa Perrone; Jane Fonda – On Golden Pond as Chelsea Thayer Wayne; Joan Hackett – Only When I Laugh as Toby Landau; Elizabeth McGovern – Ragtime as Evelyn Nesbit
**Best Writing (Screenplay Written Directly for the Screen)**: **Chariots of Fire – Colin Welland**‡; Absence of Malice – Kurt Luedtke; Arthur – Steve Gordon; Atlantic City – John Guare; Reds – Warren Beatty and Trevor Griffiths	**Best Writing (Screenplay Based on Material from Another Medium)**: **On Golden Pond – Ernest Thompson based on his play**‡; The French Lieutenant's Woman – Harold Pinter based on the novel by John Fowles; Pennies from Heaven – Dennis Potter based on his TV series; Prince of the City – Jay Presson Allen and Sidney Lumet based on the book by Robert Daley; Ragtime – Michael Weller based on the novel by E. L. Doctorow
**Best Foreign Language Film**: **Mephisto (Hungary) in German – directed by István Szabó**‡; The Boat Is Full (Switzerland) in German – directed by Markus Imhoof; Man of Iron (Poland) in Polish – directed by Andrzej Wajda; Muddy River (Japan) in Japanese – directed by Kōhei Oguri; Three Brothers (Italy) in Italian – directed by Francesco Rosi	**Best Documentary (Feature)**: **Genocide – Arnold Schwartzman and Rabbi Marvin Hier**‡; Against Wind and Tide: A Cuban Odyssey – Suzanne Bauman, Paul Neshamkin and Jim Burroughs; Brooklyn Bridge – Ken Burns; Eight Minutes to Midnight: A Portrait of Dr. Helen Caldicott – Mary Benjamin, Susanne Simpson and Boyd Estus; El Salvador: Another Vietnam – Glenn Silber and Tetê Vasconcellos
**Best Documentary (Short Subject)**: **Close Harmony – Nigel Noble**‡; Americas in Transition – Obie Benz; Journey for Survival – Dick Young; See What I Say – Linda Chapman, Pam LeBlanc and Freddi Stevens; Urge to Build – Roland Hallé and John Hoover	**Best Short Film (Live Action)**: **Violet – Paul Kemp and Shelley Levinson**‡; Couples and Robbers – Christine Oestreicher; First Winter – John N. Smith
**Best Short Film (Animated)**: **Crac – Frédéric Back**‡; The Creation – Will Vinton; The Tender Tale of Cinderella Penguin – Janet Perlman	**Best Music (Original Score)**: **Chariots of Fire – Vangelis**‡; Dragonslayer – Alex North; On Golden Pond – Dave Grusin; Ragtime – Randy Newman; Raiders of the Lost Ark – John Williams
**Best Music (Original Song)**: **"Arthur's Theme (Best That You Can Do)" from Arthur – Music by Burt Bacharach; Lyrics by Carole Bayer Sager, Christopher Cross and Peter Allen**‡; "Endless Love" from Endless Love – Music and Lyrics by Lionel Richie; "The First Time It Happens" from The Great Muppet Caper – Music and Lyrics by Joe Raposo; "For Your Eyes Only" from For Your Eyes Only – Music by Bill Conti; Lyrics by Mick Leeson; "One More Hour" from Ragtime – Music and Lyrics by Randy Newman	**Best Sound**: **Raiders of the Lost Ark – Bill Varney, Steve Maslow, Gregg Landaker and Roy Charman**‡; On Golden Pond – Richard Portman and David M. Ronne; Outland – John Wilkinson, Robert W. Glass Jr., Robert Thirlwell and Robin Gregory; Pennies from Heaven – Michael J. Kohut, Jay M. Harding, Richard Tyler and Al Overton Jr.; Reds – Dick Vorisek, Tom Fleischman and Simon Kaye
**Best Art Direction**: **Raiders of the Lost Ark – Art Direction: Norman Reynolds and Leslie Dilley; Set Decoration: Michael Ford**‡; The French Lieutenant's Woman – Art Direction: Assheton Gorton; Set Decoration: Ann Mollo; Heaven's Gate – Art Direction: Tambi Larsen; Set Decoration: James L. Berkey; Ragtime – Art Direction: John Graysmark, Patrizia von Brandenstein and Anthony Reading; Set Decoration: George DeTitta Sr., George DeTitta Jr. and Peter Howitt; Reds – Art Direction: Richard Sylbert; Set Decoration: Michael Seirton	**Best Cinematography**: **Reds – Vittorio Storaro**‡; Excalibur – Alex Thomson; On Golden Pond – Billy Williams; Ragtime – Miroslav Ondříček; Raiders of the Lost Ark – Douglas Slocombe
**Best Makeup**: **An American Werewolf in London – Rick Baker**‡; Heartbeeps – Stan Winston	**Best Costume Design**: **Chariots of Fire – Milena Canonero**‡; The French Lieutenant's Woman – Tom Rand; Pennies from Heaven – Bob Mackie; Ragtime – Anna Hill Johnstone; Reds – Shirley Russell
**Best Film Editing**: **Raiders of the Lost Ark – Michael Kahn**‡; Chariots of Fire – Terry Rawlings; The French Lieutenant's Woman – John Bloom; On Golden Pond – Robert L. Wolfe (posthumous nomination); Reds – Dede Allen and Craig McKay	**Best Visual Effects**: **Raiders of the Lost Ark – Richard Edlund, Kit West, Bruce Nicholson and Joe Johnston**‡; Dragonslayer – Dennis Muren, Phil Tippett, Ken Ralston and Brian Johnson

=== Special Achievement Award (Sound Effects Editing) ===
- Raiders of the Lost Ark – Ben Burtt and Richard L. Anderson.

=== Honorary Award ===
- To Barbara Stanwyck for superlative creativity and unique contribution to the art of screen acting.

=== Jean Hersholt Humanitarian Award ===
The award recognizes individuals whose humanitarian efforts have brought credit to the motion picture industry.

- Danny Kaye

=== Irving G. Thalberg Memorial Award ===
The award honors "creative producers whose bodies of work reflect a consistently high quality of motion picture production".

- Albert R. Broccoli

=== Multiple nominations and awards ===
Films with multiple nominations
Nominations	Film
12	Reds
10	On Golden Pond
8	Raiders of the Lost Ark
8	Ragtime
7	Chariots of Fire
5	Atlantic City
5	The French Lieutenant's Woman
4	Arthur
3	Absence of Malice
3	Only When I Laugh
3	Pennies from Heaven
2	Dragonslayer

Films with multiple wins
Wins	Film
4	Chariots of Fire
4	Raiders of the Lost Ark
3	On Golden Pond
3	Reds
2	Arthur

== Presenters and performers ==
The following individuals, listed in order of appearance, presented awards or performed musical numbers:

=== Presenters ===
Table featuring presenters for the 54th Academy Awards
Name(s)	Role
Hank Simms	Announcer for the 54th Academy Awards
Fay Kanin (AMPAS President)	Gave opening remarks welcoming guests to the awards ceremony
Timothy Hutton	Presenter of the award for Best Supporting Actress
Karen Allen; Howard E. Rollins Jr.	Presenters of the award for Best Art Direction
Kim Hunter; Vincent Price	Presenters of the award for Best Makeup
Roger Moore	Presenter of the Irving G. Thalberg Memorial Award to Albert R. Broccoli
William Hurt; Kathleen Turner	Presenters of the award for Best Original Score
Morgan Fairchild; Robert Hays	Presenters of the award for Best Costume Design
Dan Aykroyd	Presenter of the award for Best Visual Effects
Richard Benjamin; Paula Prentiss	Presenters of the awards for Best Documentary Short Subject and Documentary Feature
Paul Williams; Debra Winger	Presenters of the awards for Best Animated Short Film and Best Live Action Short Film
Chevy Chase; Rachel Ward	Presenters of the award for Best Cinematography
John Travolta	Presenter of the Academy Honorary Award to Barbara Stanwyck
Christopher Atkins; Kristy McNichol	Presenters of the award for Best Sound
Ornella Muti; Jack Valenti	Presenters of the award for Best Foreign Language Film
Ursula Andress; Harry Hamlin	Presenters of the award for Best Film Editing
Bette Midler	Presenter of the award for Best Original Song
Gregory Peck	Presenter of the Jean Hersholt Humanitarian Award to Danny Kaye
Carol Burnett; Joel Grey	Presenters of the award for Best Supporting Actor
Jack Lemmon; Walter Matthau	Presenters of the award for Best Director
Jerzy Kosiński	Presenter of the awards for Best Screenplay Written Directly for the Screen and Best Screenplay Based on Material from Another Medium
Jon Voight	Presenter of the award for Best Actress
Sissy Spacek	Presenter of the award for Best Actor
Loretta Young	Presenter of the award for Best Picture

=== Performers ===
Name	Role	Performed
Bill Conti	Musical arranger Conductor	Orchestral
Kermit the Frog; Miss Piggy	Performers	"The First Time It Happens" from The Great Muppet Caper
Sheena Easton; Richard Kiel; Harold Sakata	Performers	"For Your Eyes Only" from For Your Eyes Only
Liberace	Performer	Medley of the nominated scores
Lionel Richie; Diana Ross	Performers	"Endless Love" from Endless Love
John Schneider	Performer	"One More Hour" from Ragtime
Debbie Allen; Gregory Hines	Performers	Performed a musical tribute to Harry Warren
Christopher Cross	Performer	"Arthur's Theme (Best That You Can Do)" from Arthur
Academy Awards Chorus	Performers	"That's Entertainment!"

== Ceremony information ==
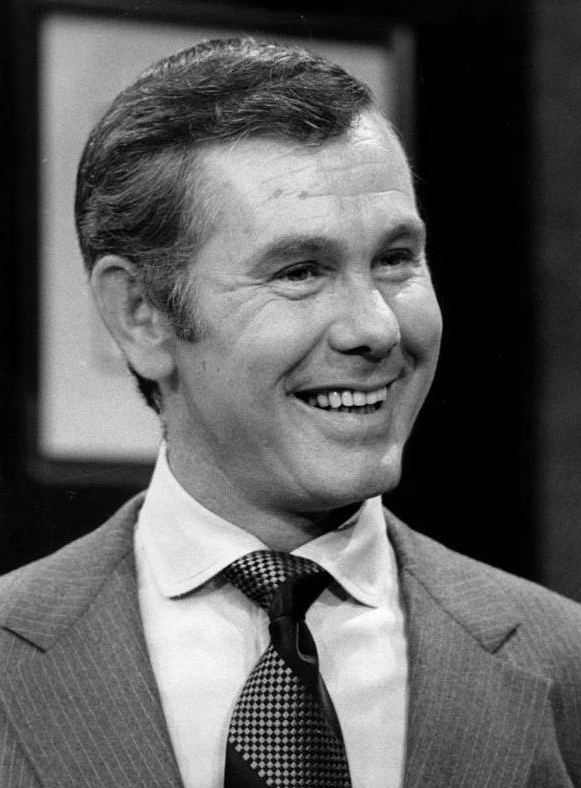
Johnny Carson hosted the 54th Academy Awards.

In November 1981, the Academy hired film director, screenwriter, and producer Melvin Frank to produce the telecast for the first time. "The Academy is fortunate that Melvin Frank has agreed to make himself available for our show," said AMPAS President Fay Kanin in a press release announcing the selection. "He joins a distinguished list of producers who have consistently made the Academy Awards the entertainment highlight of the year." Two months later, it was announced that comedian and The Tonight Show host Johnny Carson would preside over emceeing duties for the 1982 ceremony. In February 1982, Howard W. Koch took over producing duties after Frank had been hospitalized for complications stemming from a virus. Koch stated that all artistic contributions made by Frank would remain during the production of the festivities.

=== Introduction of Best Makeup award ===
Beginning with this ceremony, AMPAS introduced a new competitive award that would honor achievement in makeup. According to Academy executive administrator John Pavlik, the category would be presented if a special committee composed of makeup artists, hairstylists, cinematographers, and other related craftspeople determined that at least one film was deemed worthy of such awards. Members would be able to nominate up to five films, and the committee would review the seven films receiving the most votes to select up to three nominees. Prior to the introduction of this category, 1964's 7 Faces of Dr. Lao and 1968's Planet of the Apes were given special honorary awards.

=== Critical reviews ===
St. Petersburg Times film critic Thomas Sabulis wrote, "The Academy Awards show was a reasonably good television product. The acceptance speeches were thankfully brief and concise." Columnist Janet Maslin of The New York Times remarked, "Thanks largely to the fancifulness of the Academy of Motion Picture Arts and Sciences' voters, Monday night's Oscar presentation was the most exciting in recent years. When the awards show itself is something less than swift or glamorous, which was certainly the case this year, it can still come to life if the voting takes a sufficiently strange turn." The Atlanta Constitution critic Scott Cain commented, "The academy has steadily increased the amount of showpieces. These musical numbers worked splendidly this year and the program was relatively painless at 3.5 hours in length."

Harold Schindler of The Salt Lake Tribune called the ceremony "a three-and-a-half-hour marathon which sparkled in spots, sputtered in others, and featured some of the most uneven casting in the program's history." Austin American-Statesman film critic Patrick Taggart quipped, "Whether or not the awards will be taken more seriously in the future, the ceremony last Monday night certainly had the dreariness one associates with serious events." The Philadelphia Inquirer columnist Desmond Ryan commented that due to many winners being absent from the festivities, "An already dull evening lapsed into long stretches of tedium."

=== Ratings and reception ===
The American telecast on ABC drew in an average of 46.2 million people over the length of the entire ceremony. Moreover, the show drew higher Nielsen ratings compared to the previous ceremony, with 33.6% of households watching with a 53% share.

In August 1982, the ceremony presentation received three nominations at the 34th Primetime Emmys. The following month, it won an award for Ray Klausen's art direction of the program.

== See also ==
- List of submissions to the 54th Academy Awards for Best Foreign Language Film

== Bibliography ==
- Franks, Don (2005), Entertainment Awards: A Music, Cinema, Theatre and Broadcasting Guide, 1928 Through 2003 (3rd ed.), Jefferson, North Carolina, United States: McFarland & Company, ISBN 978-1-5791-2396-3, OCLC 53937872
- Holden, Anthony (1993), Behind the Oscar: The Secret History of the Academy Awards, New York, New York, United States: Simon & Schuster, ISBN 978-0-6717-0129-1, OCLC 26852909
- Osborne, Robert (2013). 85 Years of the Oscar: The Complete History of the Academy Awards. New York, New York, United States: Abbeville Publishing Group. ISBN 978-0-7892-1142-2. OCLC 856879222.
- Terrance, Vincent (2013). Television Specials: 5,336 Entertainment Programs, 1936–2012 (5 ed.). Jefferson, North Carolina, United States: Ballantine Books, McFarland & Company. ISBN 978-1-4766-1240-9. OCLC 844373010.
- Wiley, Mason; Bona, Damien (1996), Inside Oscar: The Unofficial History of the Academy Awards (5 ed.), New York, New York, United States: Ballantine Books, ISBN 978-0-3454-0053-6, OCLC 779680732
