= Lettie Hamlet Rogers =

American novelist

Lettie Hamlett Rogers (1917 – May 14, 1957) was an American novelist and educator.

== Early life and education ==
She was born in Suzhou, central China, the daughter of missionary parents. She spent her childhood in China and Japan. After graduating from high school at the Shanghai American School she came to the United States to attend Woman's College of the University of North (now the University of North Carolina at Greensboro). Rogers received a Bachelor of Arts degree in sociology in 1940, and accepted a position as an assistant in the Sociology Department the following year. She shared a home with faculty members Lyda Gordon Shivers and Mereb Mossman. Two years later she left her position, but remained in North Carolina where she devoted herself full-time to her writing.

== Career ==
=== Teaching career ===
In 1948 Rogers returned to the Woman's College as an assistant professor in the English Department to teach creative writing. In 1955 she resigned in protest of the College administration's censure of the staff of the campus arts journal, Coraddi, for publishing a nude male figure drawn by art student Lee Hall (later to become head of the Rhode Island School of Design).

=== Writing career ===
Rogers was well known in North Carolina literary circles. She published four novels, South of Heaven (Random House, 1946), The Storm Cloud (Random House, 1951), Landscape of the Heart (Random House, 1953), and Birthright (Simon & Schuster, 1957). She also wrote one unpublished novel, Murder in the College Degree (1940), under the name "Lettie Logan." The story is set on a fictionalized woman's college campus with faculty members from the history and psychology departments serving as detectives to help local police.
