= Two Colours (song) =

1964 Ukrainian folk song by Oleksandr Bilash and Dmytro Pavlychko

Song by Dmytro Hnatyuk
- Released: 7 October 1964
- Recorded: 1964
- Genre: Folk
- Length: 4:15
- Songwriters: Oleksandr Bilash; Dmytro Pavlychko

"Two Colours" (Ukrainian: «Два кольори», romanized: Dva koliory) is a 1964 song composed by Oleksandr Bilash, with lyrics by Dmytro Pavlychko. Though it was first performed by Anatoliy Mokrenko, it was neither recorded nor published until an October 1964 performance by Dmytro Hnatyuk.

== History ==
According to Oleksandr Bilash's daughter, "Two Colours" was inspired by a 29 February 1964 congress of the Komsomol of Ukraine. Dmytro Pavlychko, who was attending the congress together with Bilash, noticed the handkerchief of Liudmyla Moldovan, a woman sitting in front of him. Explaining to his father the colouring of the handkerchief (which had a design of red roses on a black field), he said, "Red is love, and black — grief." (Ukrainian: Червоне — то любов, а чорне — то журба, romanized: Chervone — to liubov, a chorne — to zhurba). Pavlychko was inspired by his own response to write a poem, and began writing down what would eventually become the first verse on his knee before showing it to Bilash, who was sitting next to him. Pavlychko and Bilash then left the congress for Vorzel, where they wrote the song together in half an hour.

"Two Colours" was first performed by Anatoliy Mokrenko to an audience of the Artistic Council of Ukrainian Radio, which was at the time required for a work to be permitted for recording and publication. The Artistic Council forbid the work from being published, describing the work as a "nationalist song" due to the fact that red and black were the colours of the flag of the Ukrainian Insurgent Army, as well as a line in a Ukrainian nationalist song that was similar to the lyrics of "Two Colours". Pavlychko and Bilash were both interrogated by the KGB and accused of being Banderites, an accusation Pavlychko rejected. He noted that black and red were the colours of his mother's towels and his shirt, and additionally stated that they had been the colours on the flag of the Paris Commune, which convinced censors that the song was harmless. Pavlychko would later say in an interview that he and Bilash had been frightened by the interrogation as "It could easily be proven that this was a nationalist song, of our OUN party, and so on."

"Two Colours" was first publicly performed by Dmytro Hnatyuk on 7 October 1964, a month prior to the October Revolution Day celebrations. The song was among Hnatyuk's favourites, and he said on one occasion that it was representative of Ukraine. Hnatyuk's love for the song was also noted by Pavlychko, a personal friend of Hnatyuk, who said he "sings it with his heart."

== Legacy ==
Since its first release, "Two Colours" has become a popular Ukrainian folk song and served as an emblem of the culture of Ukraine globally. The song has also been performed by at least five other Ukrainian singers, including Kvitka Cisyk, which Pavlychko would later describe as his favourite rendition. The song has also been translated into French and English, with the latter translation being controversial for its breach of copyright and protests by Bilash's family.

In Ukraine, however, the song was met with a mixed reception, with denunciations of the song and persecution of its listeners. BBC News Ukrainian suggested that this was a result of Pavlychko's brief period as a soldier of the Ukrainian Insurgent Army. Despite this, however, "Two Colours" has persisted, and was frequently cited after Pavlychko's death as being his most significant work.
