= Urge to Build =

1981 film

- Directed by: Roland Hallé
- Produced by: Roland Hallé; John Hoover
- Edited by: Loren Miller
- Distributed by: Direct Cinema
- Release date: 1981
- Country: United States
- Language: English

Urge to Build is a 1981 American short documentary film directed by Roland Hallé about individuals building their own homes. It was nominated for an Academy Award for Best Documentary Short.

== Reception ==
In Film & Video News, Louis Reile stated that "Hallé and Hoover have succeeded in building a good film out of the stuff of everyday life".
