= Richard Bernstein (bass) =

American bass

Richard Bernstein (born July 30, 1966 in Brooklyn, New York) is an American bass opera singer. A Metropolitan Opera company member since 1995, Bernstein has appeared in over 500 of its performances, including the Grammy award-winning Akhnaten in 2022. His repertoire includes the bel canto of Rossini (Mustafà in L'italiana in Algeri), classic French opera (Sancho Panza in Don Quichotte), and 20th-century works (Superintendent Budd in Albert Herring), among others.

== Biography ==
=== Early life ===
Bernstein grew up with three siblings in Brooklyn, New York, spending his high school years in Colorado. He attended the University of Southern California, graduating with a bachelor of music degree in vocal performance. His sister is the actress Didi Conn.

=== Career ===
Bernstein subsequently joined the Los Angeles Opera's Resident Artist Program, performing in several productions there from the late 90s to the early 2000s. He began his career as a bass-baritone, building a reputation for the burnished tone of his voice and the physicality of his performing. After being cast as Zuniga in Carmen for his debut performance with the Metropolitan Opera in October 1995, Bernstein marked his European debut in Valencia, Spain two months later with the role of Orest in Elektra, performing alongside the soprano Leonie Rysanek.

In early 1998, a last-minute substitution that cast Bernstein in the title role of Mozart's Le nozze di Figaro was a turning point in his career, with a debut performance at the Lyric Opera of Chicago leading to subsequent performances at the Metropolitan Opera, Los Angeles Opera, Bayerische Staatsoper, and Teatro Maggio Musicale. He subsequently performed as a soloist in Beethoven's Symphony No. 9 alongside the Chicago Symphony Orchestra at the Ravinia Festival in July 1998, followed by a performance of the Verdi Requiem at Carnegie Hall in May 1999.

Bernstein's rising prominence afforded him the opportunity to perform in the world premieres of two operas in the early 2000s. The first was the role of Laurent in Thérèse Raquin at Dallas Opera during the 2001–02 season, and the second the role of Marco in A View From the Bridge at the Metropolitan Opera during the 2002–03 season a role he would reprise for Washington Opera in the 2007–08 season. These roles injected a degree of variation into Bernstein's career, deviating from the classical operas that defined his early career with roles in contemporary American plays. Another such role was that of the prosecutor Orville Mason in An American Tragedy, which had its world premiere at the Metropolitan Opera in the 2006–07 season.

Other performances by Bernstein for the Metropolitan Opera include the role of Lord Krishna in Satyagraha during the 2011–12 season, the role of Zaretski in Eugene Onegin during the 2013–14 season, and the role of Aye in the Grammy award-winning performance of Akhnaten during the 2021–22 season. During the 2022–23 season he conducted his 500th performance at the Met as Boroff in Fedora, concluding the season singing Lodovico in Act III of Verdi’s Otello with Maestro Yannick Nézet-Séguin and the Metropolitan Opera Orchestra at New York’s Carnegie Hall.

== Contemporary American repertoire ==
Contemporary American opera has played a significant role in Bernstein's career, which includes two world premieres. At Dallas Opera in the 2001–02 season, he created the role of Laurent, the lover (and murder accomplice) of the title character in Thérèse Raquin by Tobias Picker. In 2002–03, Bernstein was featured as Marco in the Metropolitan Opera premiere of William Bolcom's A View From the Bridge, a role he reprised for Washington Opera in 2007–08.

Next, he created the role of determined prosecutor Orville Mason in Picker's An American Tragedy (based on the Theodore Dreiser novel), which had its world premiere at the Metropolitan Opera in the 2006–07 season. He assumed the role of Lord Krishna in the Met Opera premiere of Philip Glass's opera Satyagraha – a performance he recreated for the Met's Live in HD international broadcast in 2011. He performed the role of Aye Glass’s Akhnaten at the Met, which was awarded the 2022 GRAMMY® Award for Best Opera Recording. Other modern American roles include Frank Maurrant and Olin Blitch from the classic American repertoire pieces Street Scene and Susannah, respectively.

== Awards ==
=== 2009 ===
- Grammy Nomination for Classical Music (Zaretski in Eugene Onegin)

=== 2022 ===
- Grammy Award for Best Opera Recording (Aye in Akhnaten)
