= Didi Conn =

American actress (born 1951)

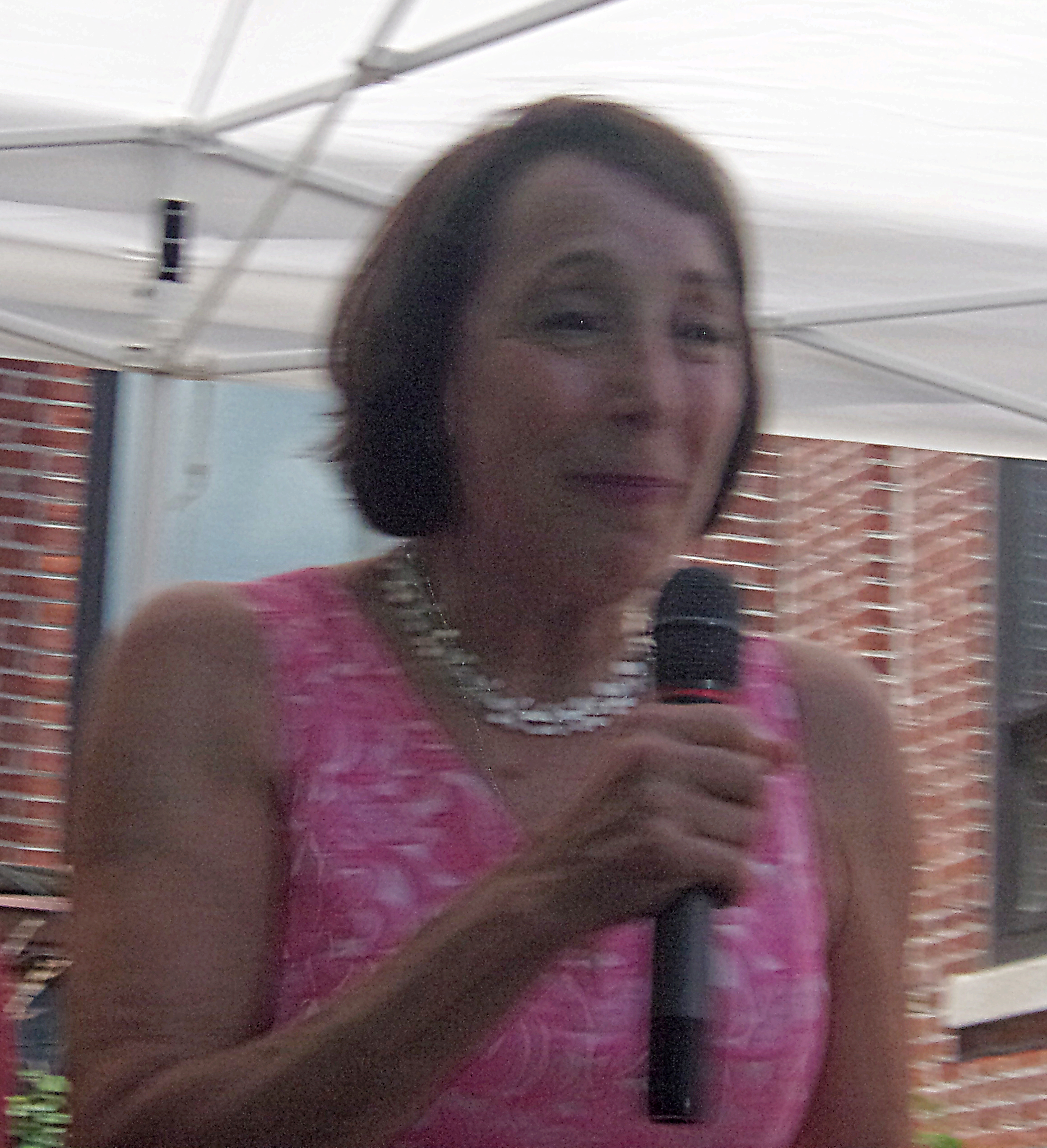
- Conn at Greenville Graffiti Car Show at Greenville, Illinois, in 2018
- Born: Edith Bernstein; July 13, 1951 (age 75); New York, New York, U.S.
- Education: Midwood High School
- Occupation: Actress
- Years active: 1973–present
- Known for: Grease; Benson; Shining Time Station
- Spouses: Frank Conn (m. 1975; div. 1978) David Shire (m. 1984)
- Children: 2
- Relatives: Richard Bernstein (brother)

Edith "Didi" Conn (née Bernstein; born July 13, 1951) is an American actress. She is best known for her work as Frenchy in Grease, Denise Stevens Downey in Benson and Stacy Jones in Shining Time Station.

== Early life ==
Edith Bernstein was born on July 13, 1951, in New York, New York. She had a Conservative "holiday Jewish" upbringing.

== Career ==
Conn made her debut as an actress in the 1960s. Her characters since the 1970s, when she became prominent, include Laurie Robinson in You Light Up My Life (1977; Kasey Cisyk provided the character's singing voice), Frenchy in the feature films Grease (1978) and Grease 2 (1982), Helen on The Practice (1976–1977), Denise Stevens Downey on Benson (1981–1984), and Stacy Jones on Shining Time Station (1989–1995). She later reprised her role as Shining Time Station manager in Thomas and the Magic Railroad (2000).

Conn provided the voice for Raggedy Ann in the animated feature Raggedy Ann & Andy: A Musical Adventure (1977) directed by Richard Williams. She appeared as a celebrity guest on game shows like Match Game, The $20,000, $25,000, $50,000, and $100,000 Pyramids, Whew!, Chain Reaction, and Go.

As a theatre actress, she was involved with Broadway productions of Lost in Yonkers (1991), The Green Bird (2000), and Say Goodnight, Gracie (2002). In 2014 she performed in The Underpants in Hartford, Connecticut. She also starred in Dan Clancy's play Middletown from 2019 until 2021.

In January 2016, she had a cameo as Vi in the Grease: Live television special on Fox, thus being the only actress to appear in all three screen adaptations of the franchise. In addition, she has appeared in numerous other roles on television.

In 2019, Conn was a contestant on the eleventh series of the British television series Dancing on Ice. At 67, she was the oldest person ever to compete on the show. She, alongside her professional partner Łukasz Różycki, were eliminated in Week 4, after the judges saved Saara Aalto and Hamish Gaman in the skate-off.

== Activism ==
Conn's adopted son Daniel is autistic. On November 13, 2008, she was named national celebrity spokesperson for Autism Speaks. Before that, she was a spokesperson for the National Alliance for Autism Research, which became part of Autism Speaks. She has performed at benefits for Foundation for Educating Children with Autism (FECA).

On September 27, 2008, Conn performed with David Shire and Lynne Wintersteller at a benefit performance for Barack Obama in Nyack, New York.

== Personal life ==
She married her first husband, Frank Conn, in 1975 and they divorced in 1978. She has been married to composer David Shire since 1984.

== Filmography ==
=== Film ===
Year	Title	Role	Notes
1977	Raggedy Ann & Andy: A Musical Adventure	Raggedy Ann (voice)	Animated film
1977	You Light Up My Life	Laurie Robinson	Singing voice provided by Kvitka Cisyk
1978	Grease	Frenchy	
1978	Almost Summer	Donna DeVito	
1981	Violet	Violet	Short film
1982	Grease 2	Frenchy	
1983	The Magic Show	Cal	
2000	Thomas and the Magic Railroad	Stacy Jones	
2002	Frida	Waitress	
2005	Shooting Vegetarians	Patrice	
2006	Helen at Risk	Helen	Short film
2008	Oh Baby!	David's Mom	
2018	Most Likely to Murder	Fran Green	
2020	The Mimic	The Gossip Lady	
2021	One December Night	Norma	
TBA	Weekend Warriors	TBA	Post-production

=== Television ===
Year	Title	Role	Notes
1973	Genesis II	TV Actress	TV movie
1975	Happy Days	Joyce	Episode: "Kiss Me Sickly"
1975	The Rookies	Young Woman	Episode: "Measure of Mercy"
1976–77	The Practice	Helen	27 episodes
1976–1984	Tattletales	Herself	10 episodes, airing September 06-10, 1976 and April 02-06, 1984
1977	Handle with Care	Jackie Morse	TV pilot
1978	Three on a Date	Eve Harris	TV movie
1978	Match Game	Herself (panelist)	6 episodes, 1 for PM
1978	Murder at the Mardi Gras	Julie Evans	TV movie
1980	Semi-Tough	Kiki	Episode: "One Bad Apple"
1980–81	The Fonz and the Happy Days Gang	Cupcake (voice)	24 episodes
1981–84	Benson	Denise Stevens Downey	72 episodes
1982	American Playhouse	Receptionist	Episode: "Working"
1983	The Love Boat	Jenny	Episode: "Love on Strike"
1983-84	The (New) $25,000 Pyramid	Herself	25 episodes
1984	Match Game-Hollywood Squares Hour	Herself (celebrity panelist)	Five episodes, airing July 16–20, 1984
1984	ABC Weekend Special	Dimples (voice)	Episode: "Bad Cat"
1985	Hotel	Patty Maloney	Episode: "Sleeping Dogs"
1985	Star Fairies	Spice (voice)	TV movie
1985	The Jetsons	Cousin Melissa	Episode: "Judy Takes Off"
1985	The $100,000 Pyramid	Herself	5 episodes aired December 9, 1985 to December 13, 1985
1987	Cagney & Lacey	Dinah Roswell	Episode: "Waste Deep"
1987	Highway to Heaven	Wanda / Birdy Belker	Episodes: "All That Glitters", "Ghost Rider"
1989–93	Shining Time Station	Stacy Jones, Gracie Jones	65 episodes
1990	The Adventures of Don Coyote and Sancho Panda	Additional voices	Episode: "Pity the Poor Pirate"
1990	Shining Time Station: 'Tis a Gift	Stacy Jones	TV special
1992	Civil Wars	Hilary Schoenfeld	Episode: "Till Debt Do Us Part"
1993	A Flintstone Family Christmas	Stella (voice)	TV special
1994	L.A. Law	Penny Tressman	Episode: "He Ain't Guilty, He's My Brother"
1995	Shining Time Station: Once Upon a Time	Stacy Jones	TV special
1995	Shining Time Station: Second Chances	Stacy Jones	TV special
1995	Shining Time Station: One of the Family	Stacy Jones	TV special
1995	Shining Time Station: Queen for a Day	Stacy Jones	TV special
1995	Cybill	Sitcom Mom	Episode: "The Cheese Stands Alone"
1998	Saturday Night Live	Herself	Episode: "Steve Buscemi/Third Eye Blind"
2002	Rugrats	Caroller (voice)	Episode: "Babies in Toyland Part 1"
2003	Stanley	Mrs. Goldberg (voice)	Episode: "Going-Away Goose/Time to Climb!"
2003	The Wild Thornberrys	Muskox #2 (voice)	Episode: "Clash and Learn"
2008–10	Law & Order: Special Victims Unit	Nurse	3 episodes
2011	Gigantic	Didi Conn	Episode: "Scramble"
2012	Didi Lightful	Didi Lightful (voice)	TV pilot
2015	Transparent	Joyce Feldman	Episode: "The Book of Life"
2016	The Call	Corrine	TV pilot
2016	Grease: Live	Vi	TV movie
2019	Dancing on Ice	Herself (contestant)	4 episodes, Series 11
2019	Welcome to the Wayne	Oldest Annacille (voice)	Episode: "Some Sort of Bad Luck Curse"
2022	Blue Bloods	Mrs. Devlin	Episode: "Where We Stand"
2023	Harlan Coben's Shelter	Mrs. Friedman	Season 1: Episodes 1-6
2025	Overcompensating	Janet	2 episodes
2026	Best Medicine	Geneva Potter	Season 1: Recurring cast member
2026	Elsbeth	Bev Corman	season 3 episode 16 "Murder, He Wrote"
