= Violet (musical) =

- Original Cast Recording
- Music: Jeanine Tesori
- Lyrics: Brian Crawley
- Book: Brian Crawley
- Basis: "The Ugliest Pilgrim" by Doris Betts
- Productions: 1997 Off-Broadway; 2014 Broadway; 2019 Off-West End

Violet is a musical with music by Jeanine Tesori and libretto by Brian Crawley based on the short story "The Ugliest Pilgrim" by Doris Betts. It tells the story of a young disfigured woman who embarks on a journey by bus from her farm in Spruce Pine, North Carolina, all the way to Tulsa, Oklahoma in order to be healed. The musical premiered Off-Broadway in 1997 and won the Drama Critics' Circle Award and Lucille Lortel Award as Best Musical.

== Productions ==
Violet was developed at the Eugene O'Neill Theater Center's National Music Theater Conference in 1994. It premiered Off-Broadway at Playwrights Horizons on March 11, 1997, and closed on April 6, 1997. Directed by Susan H. Schulman with choreography by Kathleen Marshall, the cast featured Lauren Ward as Violet, Michael McElroy as Flick and Michael Park as Monty. Other cast members included Michael Medeiros, Stephen Lee Anderson, Amanda Posner and Robert Westenberg. It won the Drama Critics' Circle Award and Lucille Lortel Award as Outstanding Musical. In January 2003, a reunion concert was held at Playwrights Horizons, at which members of the original cast performed.

The Encores! Off-Center Series held a one-night production at the New York City Center on July 17, 2013. Sutton Foster played Violet with Joshua Henry as Flick. Other cast members included Van Hughes, Austin Lesch, Anastacia McCleskey, Keala Settle, Christopher Sieber, Emerson Steele, Chris Sullivan, Rema Webb, and Paul Whitty.

Violet began previews on Broadway at the American Airlines Theatre on March 28, 2014, officially opening on April 20, 2014, with Sutton Foster starring as "Violet". The production was directed by Leigh Silverman, with musical direction by Michael Rafter, choreography by Jeffrey Page, sets by David Zinn, costumes by Clint Ramos and lights by Mark Barton. The musical had been revised and was played in one act, as was done at the Encores! July 2013 staged concert. The musical closed on August 10, 2014.

The UK premiere opened January 14th, 2019 at the Off-West End Charing Cross Theatre, with Kaisa Hammarlund as Violet. The production closed 6th April 2019.

== Plot ==
With a ticket, a suitcase, and a heart full of expectation, Violet Karl waits for a Greyhound bus in Spruce Pine, North Carolina. It is September 4, 1964. For a moment she sees herself as a young girl (Young Vi), carefree and singing a folk song ("Water in the Well"), before her face was horribly disfigured in an accident. A local's nosy question breaks Violet's reverie, prompting her to look forward to the healing she expects to receive from a televangelist in Tulsa that will help her transcend her provincial little town ("Surprised"). As the bus departs the station, the passengers muse as to where this journey might lead them ("On My Way").

The passengers pile off the bus to get some food at a rest stop in Kingsport, Tennessee ("M&M's"). In the grill Violet meets two poker-playing soldiers, Flick and Monty. Flick is a black sergeant in his early thirties, Monty a younger white corporal, a paratrooper. Both are bound for Fort Smith, Arkansas. Violet asks to join their game, and as they deal her in, she privately recalls how her father taught her to play ("Luck of the Draw").

Back on the bus, Monty teases Violet about a preacher he obviously has no faith in ("Question 'n' Answer"). He takes a book she carries and plays keep-away with it, which triggers Violet's memory of the day she found the catechism in her father's bedside table. Later, in the Nashville station, Flick wants to know exactly what it is that Violet wants to change. With the help of movie magazines she shows the soldiers the physical features she'd like best ("All to Pieces"), but they offend her when their attention wanders. She sits apart from them as the journey continues, recalling once again her younger self singing the folk song, which turns out to have been the moment just before the accident ("Water in the Well [Reprise]"). Violet daydreams an encounter between herself as Young Vi and the Preacher ("A Healing Touch"). As they are approaching Memphis, Flick seeks Violet out to apologize for offending her earlier. He suggests she can take care of herself without the help of the Preacher ("Let It Sing"). Stopping in Memphis overnight, the trio pass a hooker on the way to a boarding house, where Almeta the landlady resists housing a white woman until Flick slips her some money ("Anyone Would Do"). While a song plays on the radio ("Who'll Be the One [If Not Me]"), Violet dozes, seeing herself as Young Vi trying to dance with her father, then practicing dancing with the old lady from the bus. Monty appears and dances with both women in turn. In reality, Monty has entered Violet's room. He finds her book and starts to read things Violet has written in it. She awakes and confronts him, prompting Monty to explain himself ("You're Different" or "Last Time I Came to Memphis" in the 2014 revival).

Flick enters the room with some drinks to start the night off ("Go to It"). The threesome venture out to a Beale Street music hall, where the sight of Flick dancing with Violet attracts some unfriendly attention ("Lonely Stranger"). When Monty moves in and makes a pass at Violet, Flick leaves the hall. Violet follows him back to the boarding house; the landlady interrupts a tender moment between them. In the middle of the night, Monty stumbles in through Violet's unlocked door. He wakes her, has sex with her, then falls asleep in her lap ("Lay Down Your Head").

The music hall singer, the landlady and the hooker cap the evening with a trio about unfulfilled desire ("Anyone Would Do [Reprise]"). Violet travels with the men to Fort Smith the next morning, on her way to Tulsa. Flick and Violet pledge to write each other, but Flick gets upset about the events of the night before ("Hard to Say Goodbye"). Violet escapes to the bus bathroom, where she rehearses what she will say to spurn Monty, afraid he'll otherwise reject her first. In the front of the bus Monty rehearses his own spiel, at Flick's direction. But when it comes time to part, Monty instead asks Violet to meet him on her return stop at Fort Smith ("Promise Me, Violet"). She promises nothing, cleaving to her plan, and the bus pulls away.

In Tulsa, Violet surprises the Preacher in rehearsal with his choir ("Raise Me Up"). He pawns her off on Virgil, a young assistant, and in her frustration she recovers the memory of being carried in her father's arms after the accident ("Down the Mountain"). Soon she slips away from Virgil and returns to the televangelist's empty chapel. Violet takes out her catechism and empties slips of paper she has covered with Bible quotes onto the altar. When the Preacher discovers her, she pleads with him to help invoke her miracle ("Raise Me Up [Reprise]"). When nothing comes of this desperate attempt, she demands he see her for what she is: scarred and hideous, a prodigy of pain ("Look at Me"). She looks to the heavens for a moment; the Preacher is replaced by her father. They fight, until he apologizes for what he has done ("That's What I Could Do"). Aware that something about herself has changed, Violet assumes it is her scar; she reboards the bus, convinced she has had a miracle ("Surprised [Reprise]").

When she gets out at the Fort Smith station, Monty is there waiting. His efforts at sympathy make plain to her that her face has not changed at all. Crushed, she rejects Monty's invitation to marry him before he ships out to Vietnam. Flick is also at the station and recognizes that Violet has changed, though her scar has not. He entreats her to stay with him ("Promise Me, Violet [Reprise]"). Violet's healing is complete when she takes Flick's hand and commits to a new life with him ("Bring Me to Light").

== Casts ==
Character	Off-Broadway	Encores! Off-Center Series	Broadway
Violet	Lauren Ward	Sutton Foster	Sutton Foster
Monty	Michael Park	Van Hughes	Colin Donnell
Flick	Michael McElroy	Joshua Henry	Joshua Henry
Father	Stephen Lee Anderson	Chris Sullivan	Alexander Gemignani
Young Violet	Amanda Posner	Emerson Steele	Emerson Steele
Preacher/Bus Driver 1/Radio Singer/Bus Driver 4	Robert Westenberg	Christopher Sieber	Ben Davis
Old Lady/Hotel Hooker	Cass Morgan	Keala Settle	Annie Golden
Earl/Bus Driver 2/Radio Singer/Bobby	Michael Medeiros	Austin Lesch	Austin Lesch

== Musical numbers ==
- "Opening (Water in the Well)/Surprised" – Young Vi, Violet
- "On My Way" – Violet, Old Lady, Flick, Bus Driver, Young Vi, and Company
- "M&M's" – Company
- "Luck of the Draw" – Father, Young Vi, Violet, Monty, Flick
- "Question 'n' Answer" – Monty, Violet
- "All to Pieces" – Violet, Monty, Flick
- "A Healing Touch" – Preacher, Violet, Gospel Choir
- "Let it Sing" – Flick
- "Anyone Would Do" – Hotel Hooker
- "Who'll Be the One (If Not Me)" – Radio Singer, Radio Trio
- "You're Different" – Monty*
- "Lonely Stranger" – Music Hall Singer
- "Lay Down Your Head" – Violet
- "Anyone Would Do (Reprise)" – Music Hall Singer, Landlady, Hotel Hooker
- "Hard to Say Goodbye" – Flick, Violet
- "Promise Me, Violet" – Violet, Flick, Monty
- "Raise Me Up" – Gospel Choir, Preacher, Gospel Soloist
- "Down the Mountain" – Young Vi, Father
- "Raise Me Up (Reprise)" – Violet, Preacher
- "Look at Me" – Violet, Young Vi
- "That's What I Could Do" – Father
- "Surprised (Reprise)" – Violet and Company
- "Promise Me, Violet (Reprise)" – Flick, Violet
- "Bring Me to Light" – Young Vi, Flick, Violet, and Company

*Song replaced by "Last Time I Came to Memphis" in the 2014 Broadway Revival

== Recording ==
Cast members of the 2014 Broadway revival began a new cast recording by PS Classics on April 7, 2014. The cast album was released on June 3.

Charts

Chart (2014)	Peak position
US Billboard 200	197
US Cast Albums (Billboard)	3
US Independent Albums (Billboard)	36

There was also a cast album of the 1997 Off-Broadway run, released by Resmiranda in October 1998.

== Critical reception ==
In his review in The New York Times, Ben Brantley wrote that the musical "raised the topicality quotient...and reconfigured its source's love story to put direct emphasis on parallels between Violet and Flick, who as a black man in the southern United States knows what it's like to be judged by your skin.... 'Violet' integrates a number of styles, from gospel and bluegrass to Memphis blues.... Ms. Tesori has a fine hand for harmonies and counterpoint.... What the show fails to do is to provide any compelling sense of character.

The Broadway version opened to unanimously excellent reviews. Charles Isherwood described it as "an enduringly rewarding musical. With its tangy flavors of country, gospel, blues and honky-tonk rock, it is also her warmest, most accessible score . . . the time has come for Sutton Foster to take her place among the first rank of Broadway's musical theatre performers."

== Awards and nominations ==
=== Off-Broadway production ===
Year	Award Ceremony	Category	Nominee	Result
1997	Drama Desk Award	Outstanding Musical		Nominated
1997	Drama Desk Award	Outstanding Lyrics	Brian Crawley	Nominated
1997	Drama Desk Award	Outstanding Music	Jeanine Tesori	Nominated
1997	Drama Desk Award	Outstanding Orchestrations	Joseph Joubert and Buryl Red	Nominated
1997	Drama Desk Award	Outstanding Director of a Musical	Susan H. Shulman	Nominated
1997	Drama Desk Award	Outstanding Actress in a Musical	Lauren Ward	Nominated
1997	Drama Desk Award	Outstanding Featured Actor in a Musical	Michael McElroy	Nominated
1997	Outer Critics Circle Award	Outstanding New Off-Broadway Musical		Nominated
1997	New York Drama Critics' Circle Awards	Best Musical	Jeanine Tesori and Brian Crawley	Won
1997	Lucille Lortel Award	Outstanding Musical		Won
1997	Obie Award	Special Citation (music)	Jeanine Tesori	Won

=== Broadway production ===
Year	Award Ceremony	Category	Nominee	Result
2014	Tony Award	Best Revival of a Musical		Nominated
2014	Tony Award	Best Actress in a Musical	Sutton Foster	Nominated
2014	Tony Award	Best Direction of a Musical	Leigh Silverman	Nominated
2014	Tony Award	Best Featured Actor in a Musical	Joshua Henry	Nominated
2014	Drama Desk Award	Outstanding Featured Actor in a Musical	Joshua Henry	Nominated
2014	Drama Desk Award	Outstanding Revival of a Musical		Nominated
2014	Drama Desk Award	Outstanding Actress in a Musical	Sutton Foster	Nominated
2014	Drama League Award	Distinguished Performance	Sutton Foster	Nominated
2014	Outer Critics Circle Award	Outstanding Actress in a Musical	Sutton Foster	Nominated
2014	Outer Critics Circle Award	Outstanding Featured Actor in a Musical	Joshua Henry	Nominated
2014	Outer Critics Circle Award	Outstanding Revival of a Musical (Broadway or Off-Broadway)		Nominated
