= Americas in Transition =

1981 film by Obie Benz

- Directed by: Obie Benz
- Produced by: Obie Benz
- Narrated by: Edward Asner
- Distributed by: Icarus Films
- Release date: 1981
- Country: United States
- Language: English

Americas in Transition is a 1981 American short documentary film directed by Obie Benz. It was nominated for an Academy Award for Best Documentary Short.
