= Violet (1981 film) =

1981 film

- Directed by: Shelley Levinson
- Written by: Susan Baskin; Doris Betts
- Based on: "The Ugliest Pilgrim" by Doris Betts
- Produced by: Paul Kemp; Shelley Levinson; John D. Schwartz; Karen Shapiro
- Starring: Didi Conn
- Edited by: Lynne Southerland
- Music by: Donald Peake
- Production company: Center for Advanced Film Studies
- Distributed by: COE Film Associates
- Release date: 1981
- Running time: 31 minutes
- Country: United States
- Language: English

Violet is a 1981 American short film directed by Shelley Levinson and starring Didi Conn. It won the Oscar for Best Live Action Short Film in 1982. The film is based on the Doris Betts short story, "The Ugliest Pilgrim," first published in the collection Beasts of the Southern Wild and Other Stories in 1973 (Harper & Row Publishers).

== Cast ==
- Didi Conn as Violet
- Patrick Dollaghan as Monty
- Rodney Saulsberry as Flick
- Tom McGowan as Dr. Pleasance
- Belle Richter as Mrs. Higgins
- Doris Hess as Effie
