= Kvitka Cisyk =

American opera singer (1953–1998)

- Квітка Цісик
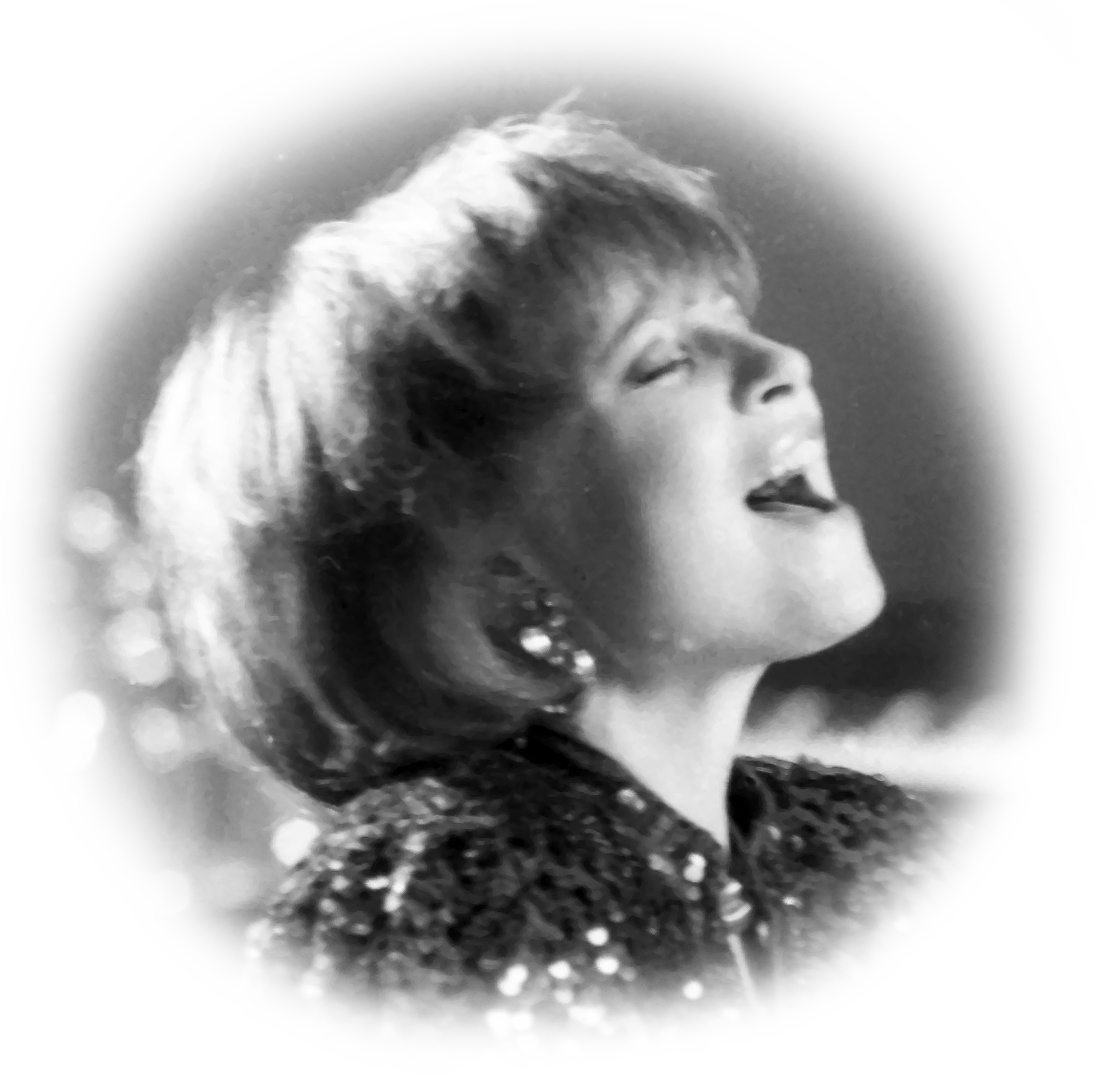
- Cisyk in 1989
- Born: Kvitoslava-Orysia Cisyk; April 4, 1953; Queens, New York, U.S.
- Died: March 29, 1998 (aged 44); Manhattan, New York, U.S.
- Occupations: Singer, actress
- Years active: 1971–1998
- Spouses: Jack Cortner; Edward J. Rakowicz (m. 1983)
- Children: 1
- Musical career
- Genres: Blues; folk; opera
- Instrument: Vocals
- Labels: ABC; Arista; KMC
- Website: kvitkacisyk.com

Kvitka Cisyk (Note: Ukrainian: Квітка Цісик, romanized: Kvitka Tsisyk, Ukrainian pronunciation: [ˈkʋʲitkɐ ˈt͡sʲisɪk]) (April 4, 1953 – March 29, 1998, born Kvitoslava-Orysia Cisyk (Note: Ukrainian: Квітослава-Орися Цісик, romanized: Kvitoslava-Orysia Tsisyk); also known as Kacey Cisyk) was an American singer of Ukrainian origin. She had coloratura soprano voice while being a classically trained opera singer. Cisyk achieved success in four musical genres: popular music, classical opera, Ukrainian folk music and commercial jingles for radio and TV advertisements.

Cisyk recorded "You Light Up My Life" for the film of the same title (Oscar and Golden Globe Awards win in 1978), sang the "Have you driven a Ford lately?" and "You deserve a break today!" jingles, and released two critically acclaimed albums of Ukrainian songs.

== Early life ==
Cisyk was the daughter of two Ukrainian immigrants from Eastern Galicia; her given name, Kvitka, is Ukrainian for "flower". Her father, Wolodymyr Cisyk, a well known Ukrainian concert violinist and teacher, taught his daughter the violin when she was five years old, grooming her for a career as a classical musician.

== Education ==
Cisyk attended the High School of Music & Art in New York City and graduated in 1970. She attended Harpur College, also known as SUNY Binghamton, for one year directly after high school. Her sister taught piano there. In the summer of 1971, she attended a SUNY-sponsored opera program in Ghent, Belgium. She received a violin scholarship to the Mannes College of Music, but had switched to classical voice training by the time of her graduation.

In January 1971, the initiative committee (chaired by Lubomyr Zobniv), which consisted mainly of Harpur College students, created a television program called "Thoughts of Ukraine" to mark the Day of Unity of Ukraine. The script was prepared by Maria Cisyk (music teacher) and Maria ("Mima") Koropiy (graduate student in French; host of a Ukrainian radio program). The program featured Ukrainian folk dances, poems by Taras Shevchenko, songs performed by Kvitka Cisyk with guitar accompaniment by Bohdan Sokhan (a student from New York) and Yuriy Turchyn (a student at Rutgers University), and songs accompanied by Maria Tsysyk's piano. The individual performances were harmoniously combined with photographic material from Ukraine and background music selected and played for the program by Maria Cisyk. On the evening of January 22, the program "Thoughts on Ukraine" was broadcast on WINR-TV.

== Music career ==
Cisyk's original goal was a career as an opera singer, but her father's death left the family without a source of income. Needing to earn money immediately, Cisyk pursued a career as a session singer in popular music. She drew her professional name (Kacey) from her first and last initials.

Cisyk began singing in clubs, while submitting audition tapes to producers and advertising agencies. She had a successful career as a background singer in popular music, working as a backup singer for Carly Simon and Michael Franks and for artists produced by Quincy Jones.

=== Soundtrack and commercial jingle success ===
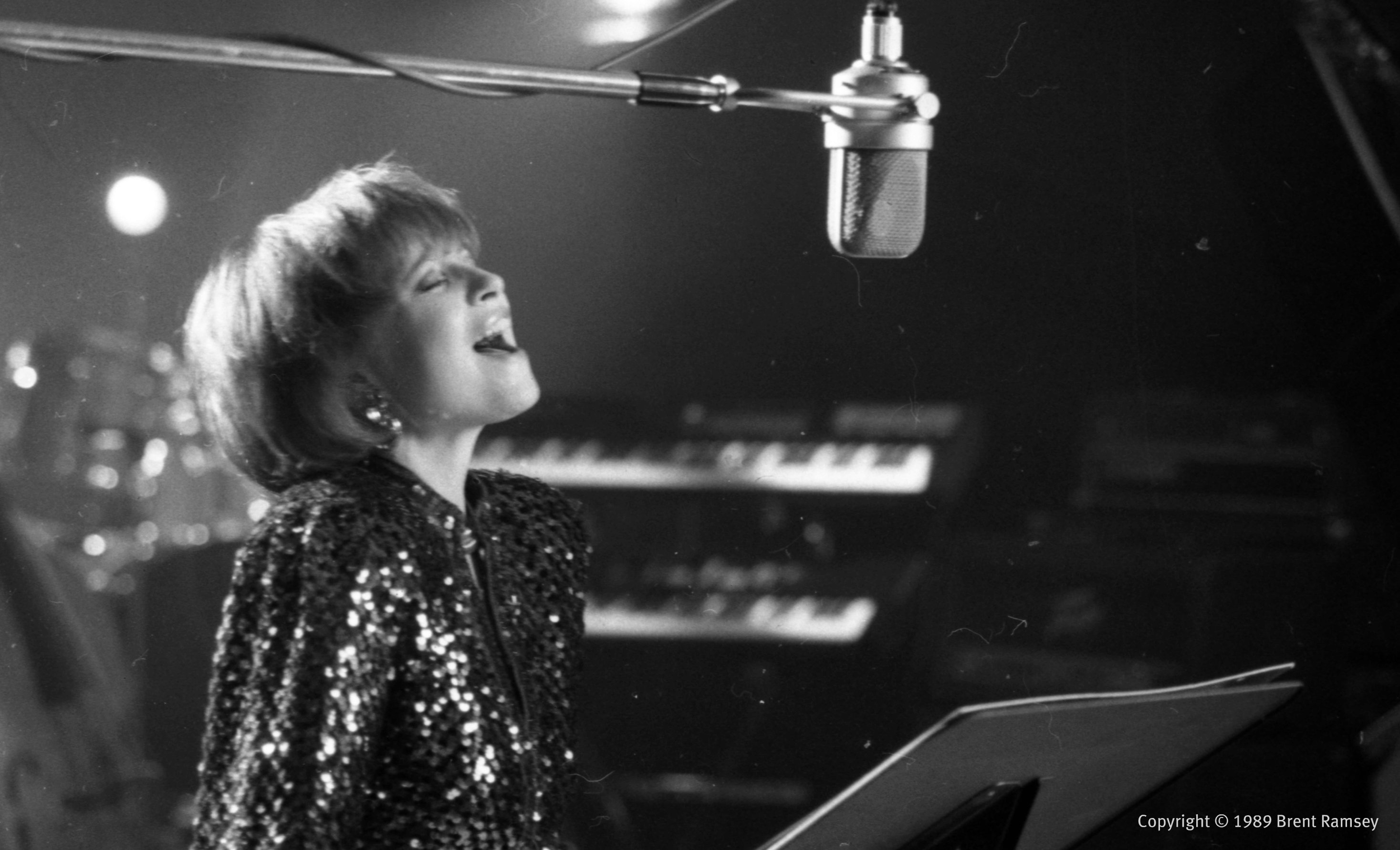
Cisyk performing in 1989

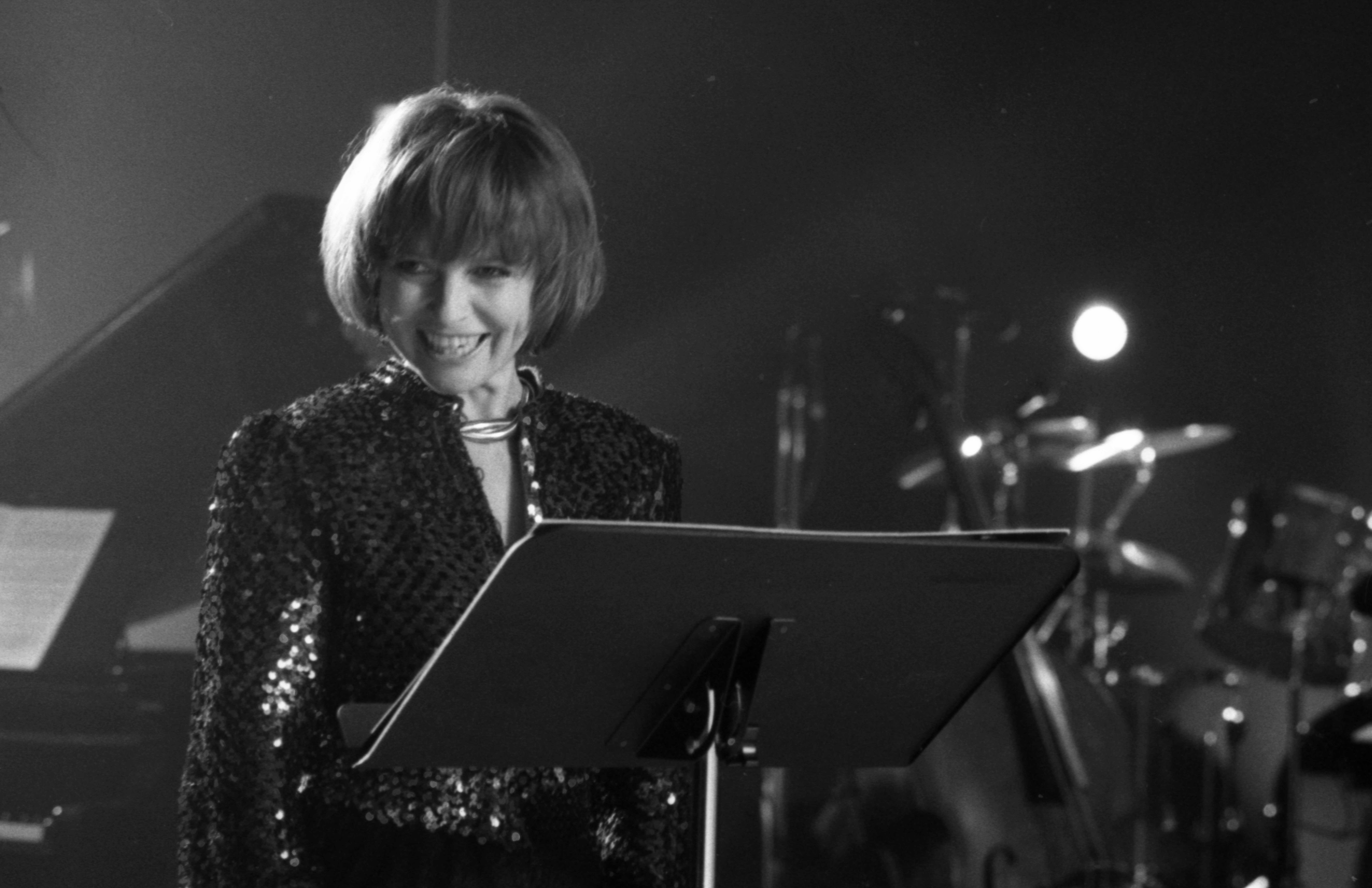
Cisyk in 1989

Cisyk's work in commercials brought her to the attention of Joe Brooks, who worked as a composer and arranger of jingles. Brooks, who wrote, directed and composed the score for the movie You Light Up My Life chose Cisyk to dub the singing voice of actress Didi Conn.

Cisyk's performance of the song appears on the original soundtrack album, and was released as a single, although she was not listed as the performing artist in the final credits of the film (for which she successfully sued the producers). Her single release of the song reached No. 80 on the Billboard Hot 100 charts.

The song was also recorded by singer Debby Boone, with Brooks producing and arranging. This recording of "You Light Up My Life", became a No. 1 single on the Billboard chart for ten consecutive weeks. People magazine ran a substantial article about "The real voice behind 'You Light Up My Life" inasmuch the similarity between her and Debby Boone's voice led many to assume the latter had sung the songs in the movie. In a 2013 biographical essay about Cisyk, her second husband, Ed Rakowicz wrote that Brooks "withheld payment" and "tried to evade payment by false promises and by asking her to be an incidental actor in his film, implying huge rewards yet to come." Later, (according to Rakowicz's biographical essay), Brooks made improper advances toward Cisyk, and after being rebuffed, didn't speak directly to her again, and continued to evade payments to her. Rakowicz writes, "[Kacey] retained a lawyer and sued Brooks for the fees she earned for her work on the record and the film but accepted an award of a small sum just to relieve herself of the torment of a prolonged legal battle with Brooks." Brooks then had Cisyk's singing credit removed from the endcredits of the film.

Later in 2009, Joseph Brooks became the subject of an investigation after being accused of a series of casting-couch rapes. He was indicted in May 2009 by the state Supreme Court for Manhattan (a trial-level court) on 91 counts of rape, sexual abuse, criminal sexual act, assault, and other charges. While awaiting trial, Brooks killed himself in May, 2011.

Cisyk also recorded lead vocals for the soundtracks of the movies The One and Only and Circle of Two. She also contributed backing vocals to the Carly Simon songs used on the soundtrack for the movie Working Girl.

Cisyk achieved her widest success as a singer of the musical jingles used in TV and radio commercials. Cisyk's recording of the slogan "Have you driven a Ford lately?" was used in Ford commercials from 1981 to 1998; in 1989, Ford executives estimated that Cisyk's recording of that phrase had been heard 20 billion times.

In addition to Ford, Cisyk sang for automakers General Motors and Toyota. She recorded spots for the three national television networks in the 1980s (ABC, NBC and CBS), four major airlines (American, Delta, Eastern and TWA), two national retailers (Sears and JCPenney), and the two most popular soft drinks: Coca-Cola and Pepsi.

According to her New York Times obituary, "a typical day, she later recalled, would begin with a 9 am session for Trans World Airlines, followed by Coca-Cola at eleven, Hartz Mountain at 1 pm, Eastern Airlines at two, Datsun at three, L'Eggs at five, McDonald's at six, and, after all that, a recording session from 8:30 pm to 3 am".

== Ukrainian music ==
As the daughter of Ukrainian immigrants, Cisyk was raised with Ukrainian music, and she is well known in the Ukrainian-speaking world for her two albums of Ukrainian songs. According to Cisyk she recorded these albums because her colleagues often asked her to "show them something Ukrainian, but there were no records worthy of being shown".

In 1980 she recorded her first album, Kvitka, Songs of Ukraine which won top honors in the 1988 Ukrainian Music Awards.

Her second album, Kvitka, Two Colors, released in 1989, was dedicated to "the spirit of the Ukrainian soul, whose wings can never be broken." Today, songs from both albums continue to be heard on radio in Ukraine.

Both albums were nominated for a Grammy Award for Best Contemporary Folk Album.

Both Songs of Ukraine and Two Colors were family projects. Cisyk's second husband, Ed Rakowicz, a recording engineer, produced Kvitka Two Colors; her first husband, Jack Cortner arranged and conducted them both. Her sister, Maria Cisyk, a concert pianist and teacher, performed the solo piano selections on the record, and her mother, Iwanna, made sure her Ukrainian pronunciation was perfect.

== Death and legacy ==
Kvitka Cisyk Rakowicz died of breast cancer on March 29, 1998, at the age of 44.

For what would have been her 60th birthday, Ukrainian Inter TV channel broadcast a documentary film Kvitka. Single copy voice. The film examined the phenomenon of her life and career, and interviewed her relatives and close friends: husband Ed Rakowicz, son Eddie, family from Lviv and the United States, as well as peers and fans. On April 4, 2013 premieres of the film took place in Kyiv, Lviv, Ternopil, Ivano-Frankivsk, Odesa, Luhansk and Chernivtsi. The film debuted on Inter TV channel on April 5, 2013.

Her contribution to Ukrainian music is recognized with a yearly music festival. Parks and streets were also named for her in Kyiv, Vinnytsia Oblast and Lviv, Ukraine. In September 2022 a street that was named after Soviet child actress Gulya Korolyova in Dnipro was renamed to honor Cisyk. On 20 May 2024 the Poltava city council renamed a street in its city in honour of her.

== Recordings ==
=== Solo albums ===
- Kvitka, Songs of Ukraine 1980
- Kvitka, Two Colors 1989
- Single: Off To War: Kvitka Cisyk 2022

=== Credits/participations ===
Artist	Song/Album/Film Title	Year	Credit/Participation
Michel Camilo	Forbidden Fuit	1994	Vocals (Background)
Flying Monkey Orchestra	Back in the Pool	1993	Vocals, Choir, Chorus
Sadao Watanabe	Earth Step	1994	Vocals (Background)
Sesame Street	Sesame Road	1993	Vocals, Voices
Bonkers	Bonkers Theme, Let's Go Bonkers	1993	Vocals, (Background)
Darkwing Duck	Darkwing Duck Theme,	1991	Vocals, (Background)
Carole King	City Streets	1989	Vocals (Background)
Various Artists	Working Girl	1988	Vocals (Background)
Michael Franks	The Camera Never Lies	1987	Vocals (Background)
Neal Fox	A Painting	1977	Vocals (Background)
Michael Franks	Skin Dive	1985	Vocals (Background)
Michael Franks	Passionfruit	1983	Vocals (Background)
Marvin Stamm	Stammpede	1983	Vocals
Roberta Flack	I'm the One	1982	Vocals, Vocals (Background)
Michael Franks	Objects of Desire	1982	Vocals (Background)
David Sanborn	Voyeur	1982	Vocals, Vocals (Background)
Joseph Brooks	You Light Up My Life	1977	Vocals, Vocals (Background)
Alan and Marilyn Bergman	The One and Only	1978	Vocals
Michael Franks	Indispensable	1988	
Michael Johnson	Lifetime Guarantee	1984	Solo, Background vocals
Spyro Gyra	Freetime	1981	Backing vocals
Small Voices Calling	Sounds of a Better World	2000	Vocals
