= Bicolor =

Bicolor or bicolour may refer to:

- Bicolour (flag), a flag of two color bands
  - Bicolour, the flag of Haiti
- Bicolor cat, or piebald cat, a cat with white fur and fur of some other color

== See also ==
- , including a number of biological species
- Two Colours (disambiguation)
- Bipack color, an early method of filming in color
