= Coraddi =

American art and literature magazine

The Coraddi is the art and literature magazine of the University of North Carolina at Greensboro. It was first published on March 15, 1897, under the name State Normal Magazine to provide news in relation to the State Normal and Industrial College, the former name of the University of North Carolina at Greensboro. In 1919, both its name and its content were changed. The magazine was renamed The Coraddi in honor of its founders: the Cornelian, Adelphian, and Dikeian literary societies. During the relaunch, its purpose expanded to include both art and literature.

== History ==
Founded on March 15, 1897, The Coraddi is the longest running publication produced by the University of North Carolina at Greensboro. In 2017, The Coraddi moved itself to an online platform. It now publishes multimedia art and video as well as literature and visual arts.

== Circulation ==
The Coraddi is published biannually, producing one edition each Spring and Fall. The Coraddi accepts submissions from current students, alumni, and faculty/staff, according to guidelines available on their website and social media pages.

== Awards ==
The Coraddi has received The Printing Industries of America's Certificate of Merit in 1983 and 1987.

== Artwork ==
The Coraddi accepts a variety of art mediums including, but not limited to, painting, sculptures, digital works, and more.

== Literature ==
The Coraddi also accepts a variety of literature

"Old Wives Tale" Rebecca White

"Grand Stands" Emily Lampkin
