= Oleksandr Bilash =

Musical artist

Hero of Ukraine People's Artist (USSR, Ukraine) Oleksandr Bilash Олександр Білаш

Background information
- Born: March 6, 1931; Hradyzk, Ukrainian SSR, Soviet Union
- Died: May 6, 2003 (aged 72) Kyiv, Ukraine
- Occupation: Composer
- Years active: 1956–2003

Oleksandr Ivanovych Bilash, (Note: Ukrainian: Олександр Іванович Білаш, romanized: Oleksandr Ivanovych Bilash) sometimes given as Olexandr Bilash, anglicized: Alexander Bilash (6 March 1931 – 6 May 2003) was a Soviet and Ukrainian composer and the author of popular lyric songs, ballads, operas, operettas, oratorios and music for films. Laureate of the Shevchenko National Prize (1975), People's Artist of the Ukrainian SSR (1977), People's Artist of the USSR (1990), Hero of Ukraine (2001).

== Biography ==
Bilash was born on 6 March 1931 in the town of Hradyzk, Ukraine (now Kremenchuk Raion of Poltava Oblast, Ukraine) to a family of skilled amateur musicians. His father, Ivan Panasovych Bilash, played balalaika and guitar; his mother, Yevdokiya Andriyivna, was a solo singer at rural gatherings.

After studying for a year in the Kyiv music school for adults, Oleksandr traveled to the city of Zhytomyr where he entered the second year of the Viktor Kosenko Music School. In 1951, Bilash had successfully passed the entrance examinations for entry into the faculty of Composition of the Kyiv Conservatory. He studied composition with the outstanding Ukrainian composer and teaching professor Mykola Vilinsky. Oleksandr Bilash graduated from the Kyiv Conservatory in 1957.

From 1956–1961 Bilash worked as an Instructor of music theory at the Kyiv Pedagogical Institute (Kyiv Teachers Training Institute, now Borys Grinchenko Kyiv University). Already Bilash had emerged as a pre-eminent and prolific Ukrainian composer who had contributed immensely to variety of musical genres and styles. Many of his lyric songs became very popular in Ukraine. His lyric songs have become a part of the 'golden fund' of Ukrainian national culture and many of them are often perceived as traditional folk songs. He composed the opera "Haydamaky" (1965), "The Ballad of War" (1971), "The Grooms" (1985), operetta "The Legend of Kyiv", "The Bells of Russia". Bilash opposed the soundtrack to numerous movies. One of them - "Roman and Francesca" (1960) with the celebrated lyric songs by Bilash was the first Soviet film (musical) where love between a Soviet sailor and a foreign girl was not criminalized. At the time of Chernobyl nuclear accident in April 1986, the popular lyric song "Dva kolyory" (Two colors) composed by Oleksandr Bilash sounded like a revelation.

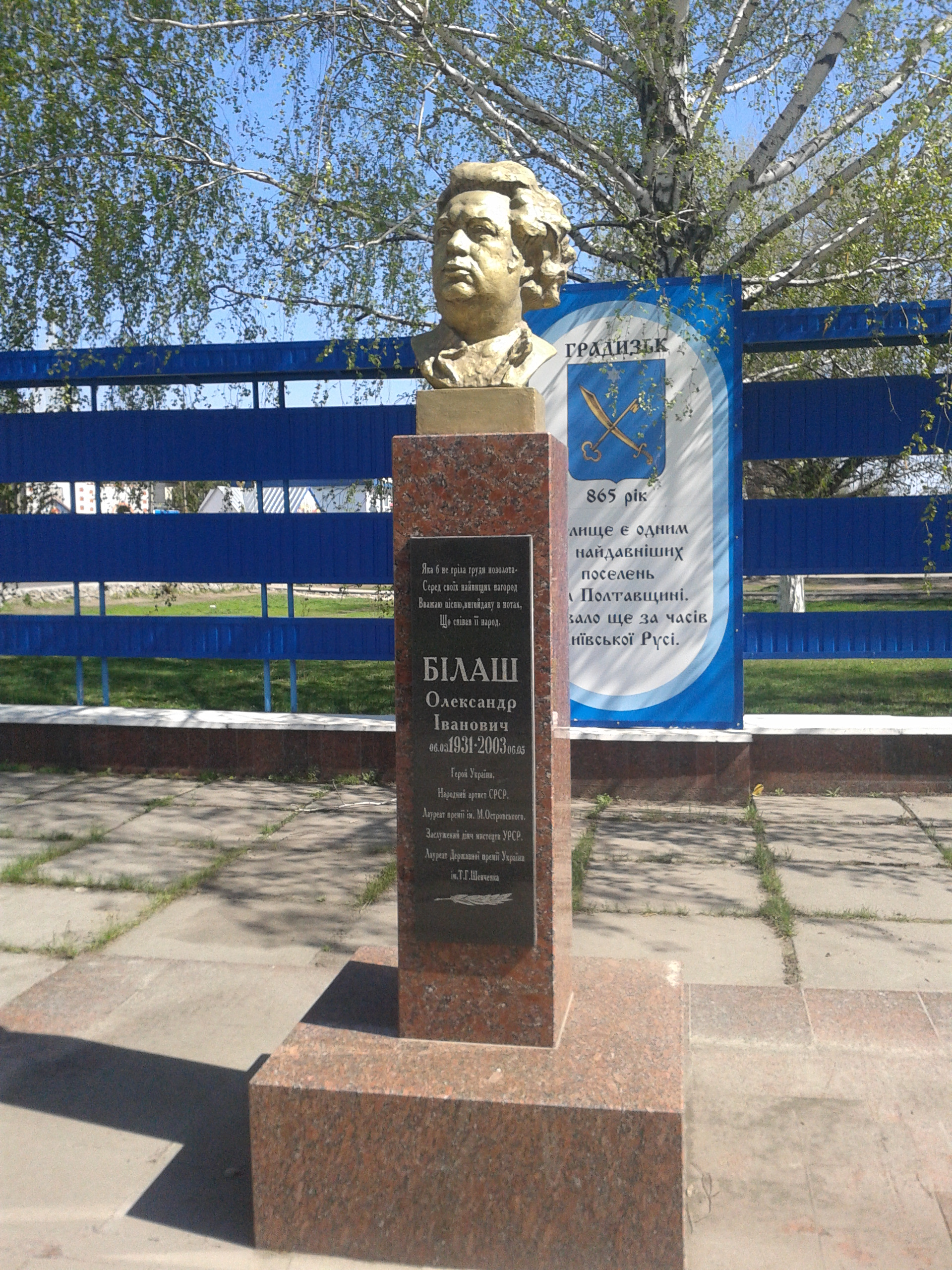
The monument to Bilash in Hradyzk, Ukraine

From 1976 to 1994 Bilash served as the Chairman of the Kyiv branch of the Union of Composers of Ukraine. Oleksandr Bilash was one of the most highly regarded Ukrainian composers and his creative output was highly praised. Among others, Bilash received the State Taras Shevchenko Award (1975), titles of People's Artist of the Ukrainian SSR (1977) and People's Artist of the USSR (1990). In March 2001, the honorable title of the Hero of Ukraine (the highest State degree of recognition in Ukraine) was bestowed upon him for his 'outstanding personal contribution to the enrichment of the spiritual treasures of the Ukrainian people and many years of fruitful creative activity' (6 March 2001). His wife was famous Ukrainian singer Larysa Ostapenko-Bilash (1935–2010) with whom he had two daughters Lesya and Oksana. Oleksandr Bilash died on 6 May 2003 in Kyiv. He was buried at the Baikove Cemetery in Kyiv, the burial place of the Ukrainian elite.
