= Oy Vershe Miy, Vershe =

Lemkos folk wedding song

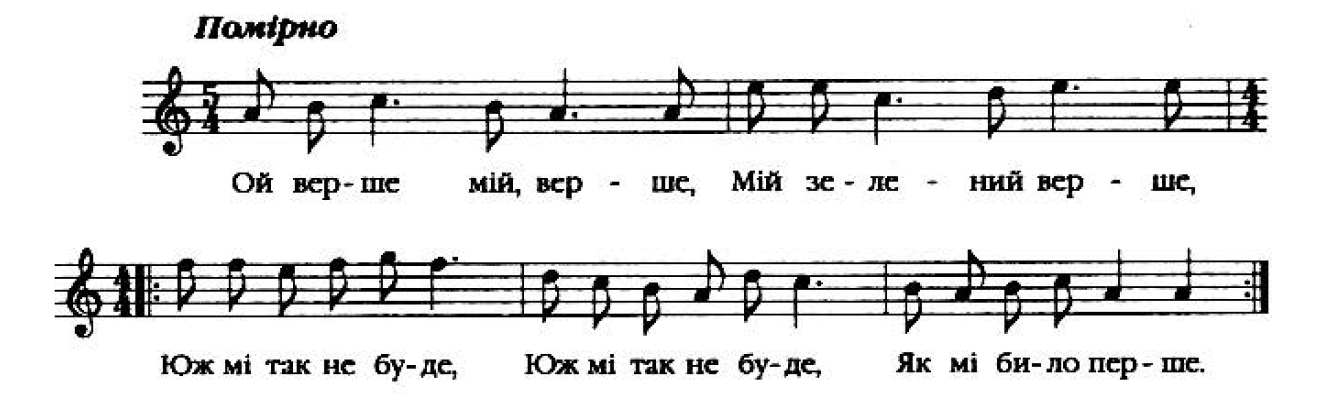

Song by Miro Skala, Hanna Sherey, Baiko Sisters, Kvitka Cisyk, Jamala, Illaria
- Language: Ukrainian (Lemko dialect)
- English title: Oh Mountain, My Mountain
- Released: 1885, 1928
- Genre: Folk; lyrical; wedding music
- Label: Columbia Records, Melodiya
- Songwriter: Folk music

"Oy Vershe Miy, Vershe" (Ukrainian: «Ой верше мій, верше», lit. 'Oh Mountain, My Mountain') — a Lemko folk song. It is one of the most popular Lemko songs, holding a special place among the most performed Ukrainian songs.

The song belongs to the category of family and wedding songs. It narrates the tale of a young woman who falls in love and marries a man. However, she feels a sense of longing, anticipating that life in a new home and marriage will not be as comforting as it was with her mother.

Following the expulsion of the Lemko people from their historical homeland as a result of the so-called "freewill" deportation from Poland to the USSR (1944–1946) and the ethnic cleansing of "Operation Vistula" (1947), the song "Vershe Miy, Vershe" became a symbol of the people's yearning for their lost homeland. For many Lemkos, the victory of Crimean Tatar singer Jamala with this song at the "New Wave" competition held a particular significance.

"You could hear how the pain of deportation of one ethnic group of people connected to Ukraine echoed with the pain of another ethnic group of people connected to Ukraine."

== Recording and performance history ==
=== Early history ===
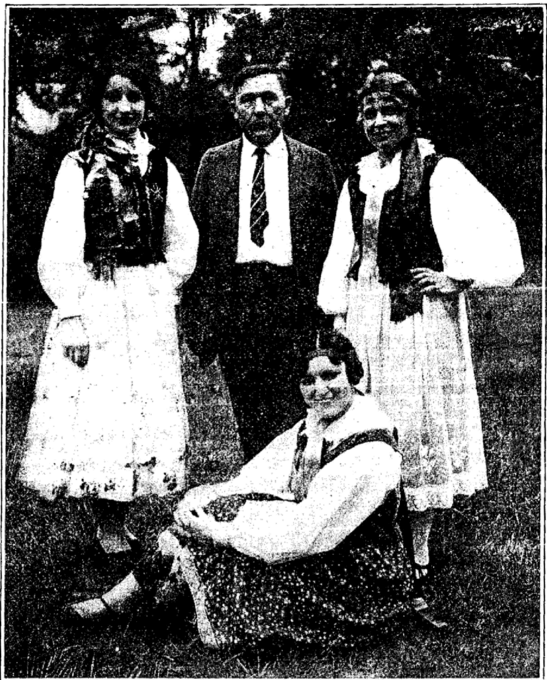
Participants of the first recording of the song. Joanna Karlyak, Victor Hladyk and Eva Tsiuryk are standing. Anna Dran is sitting

External media

Audio
- Telnyuk Sisters

Video
- Oksana Mucha at the contest named after Kvitka Cisyk
- Jamala at the "New Wave" contest
- Illaria music video
- Laboratorium Pieśni
- Lesia Mackiv
- "Wilcze Echa" Kapela folkowa
- Tonya Matvienko at Holos Krainy
- Bandurists Yuliya Boyko and Vitaliya Yakymovych arranged by Oksana Gerasimenko

The first known printed mention of the song appears in the collection "Hungarian-Russian folk songs: with an essay on the life of Hungarian Russians and an ethnographic map of Hungary", published by Hryhorii De-Vollan in 1885. The collection included the following text of the song:

Original Гей верше мой, верше, Мой зеленый верше, Ужъ мѣ такъ не буде, Якъ мѣ было перше. Отпало яблушко От сладкой яблони; Ужъ мѣ такъ не буде, Якъ мѣ было влони.	Latinisation Hey vershe moy, vershe, Moy zelenyy vershe, Uzh mi tak ne bude, Yak mi bylo pershe. Otpalo yablushko Ot sladkoy yablony; Uzh mi tak ne bude, Yak mi bylo vlony.	Translation Hey, mountain, my mountain, My green mountain, It won't be like this anymore, As it was before. An apple has fallen From a sweet apple tree; It won't be like this anymore, As it was last year.

In Ivan Verkhratskyi's monograph "On the Dialect of Galician Lemkos" (Ukrainian: «Про говір галицьких лемків») (1902), several variants of this song are presented.

The first audio recording of the song was made by Osyp Rozdolskyi on a wax phonograph cylinder in 1912.

The recording was made in Lemkivshchyna in the village of Ropica Gоrna (formerly Ropica Ruska), now Gorlice County, Lesser Poland Voivodeship, Poland. Phono cylinder No. 445, lasting 2 minutes 35 seconds, contained four songs: "Eey Bozhe Bozhe Nych Ne Mame" («Ей Боже Боже нич не маме» "Oh God, God, We Have Nothing"), "Eey Yak ot Tale Pidu" («Ей як от тале піду» "Hey, How I'll Go"), "A Vershe Miy Vershe" (Ah, Mountain My Mountain), and "Nasha Khata Bilena" («Наша хата білена» "Our House is Whitewashed"). On this recording, the song "A Vershe Miy Vershe" had two verses and was in a rather lively tempo.

In 1928, a 78 rpm record was released in New York City on the Columbia label, containing two Lemko songs. On the first side – "Za Horamy, za Lisamy" (Beyond the Mountains, beyond the Woods), and on the second – "Oi Versze, Myi Vershe" performed by a duet of New York Cathedral Choir members Anna Dran and Joanna Karlyak with orchestral accompaniment. In fact, almost all subsequent solo performances of the song used the same words. However, there is a significant diversity in both the text and the melody and rhythm in folklore and musical notations.

The first sheet music of the song was published by Klyment Kvitka in 1922. The recording was made by him in 1918 in a shelter for refugees in Kyiv from a 35-year-old woman from Lemkivshchyna from the village of Pielgrzymka Jasło County, who refused to give her name.

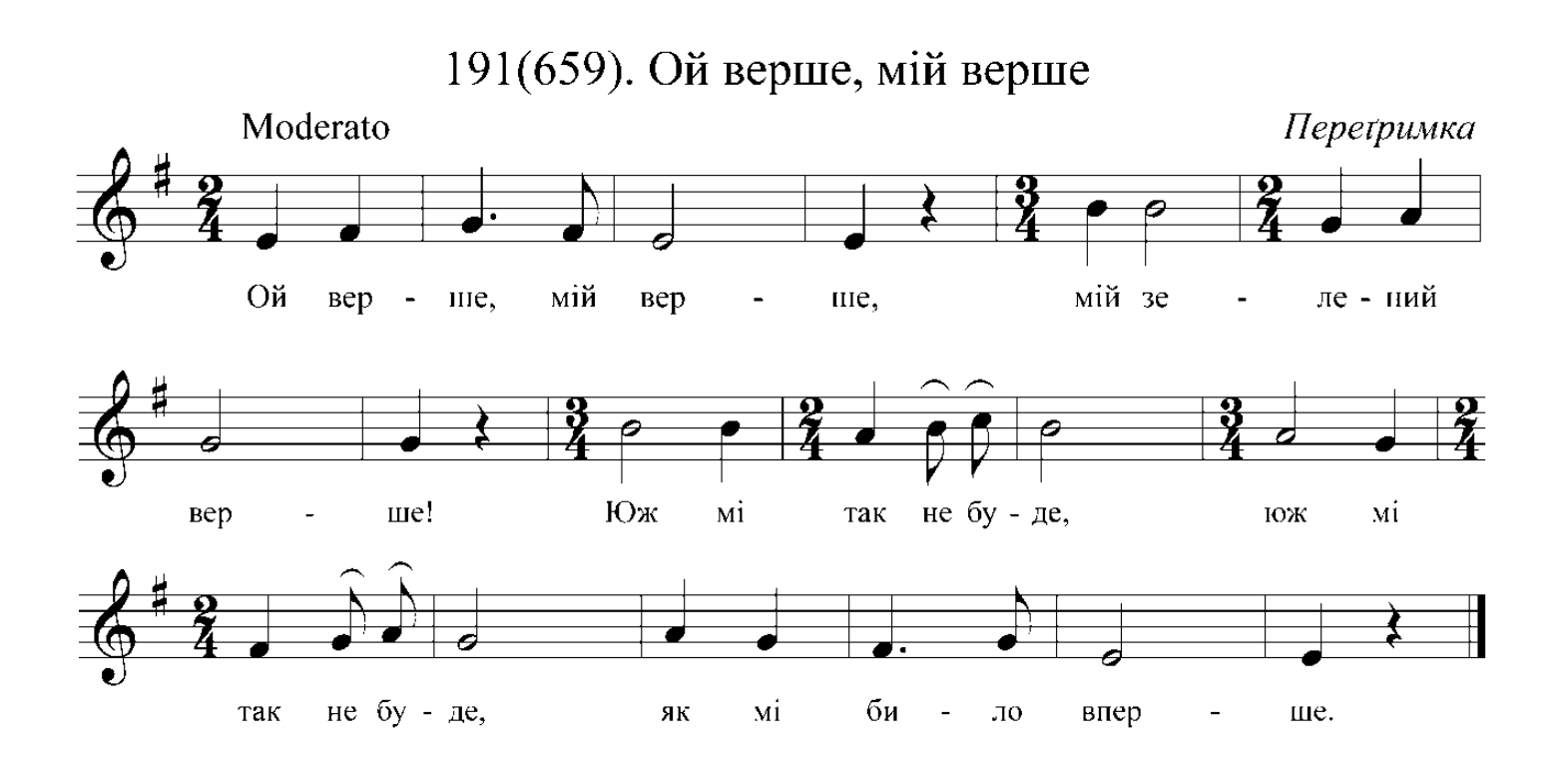

A choral arrangement for mixed voices was created by Michael Hayvoronsky in the collection "Ukrainian Folk Songs of Lemkivshchyna and Zakarpattya" («Українські народні пісні Лемківщини і Закарпаття»), published in the 1930s The song was recorded from P. Kovalchuk from near Gorlice. Hayvoronsky used a dialogue-style arrangement between the women's and men's choral groups, in accordance with the content of the lyrics. This arrangement was included in the collection of choral arrangements of Lemko songs "Spivanochky Moyi" («Співаночки мої» "My Songs") compiled by Ivan Maychyk in 1968 A collection called "Homin Verkhovyny" («Гомін Верховини» "Echo of the Highlands") was also published in Ukraine by Yevhen Kozak in 1962. It included 12 arrangements of Lemko songs for a 4-part unaccompanied choir, including "Oy Chorna Hora, Chorna" («Ой чорна гора, чорна» "Oh, Black Mountain, Black"), "Oy Vershe Miy, Vershe" («Ой верше мій, верше» "Oh Mountain, My Mountain"), and "Hayem Zelenеnkym" («Гаєм зелененьким» "Through the Green Grove"). A version of the song in the Pannonian Rusyn language, is also known, recorded in Kucura (Vojvodina) in 1930. The lyrics were recorded by Onufry Tymko, under the pseudonym Ton, and J. Shandor composed an original melody for it. In addition to expressing sadness for the loss of her home, the girl also laments that her beloved is avoiding her:

Original Ей, шугай, ей, шугай, до нас чом нє придзеш? Чи ше оца боїш, чи о мнє нє стоїш? Оца ше нє боїм, а о тебе стоїм, Лєм ше злих язикох, ей, найвецей боїм.	Latinisation Ey, shuhay, ey, shuhay, do nas chom nye prydzesh? Chy she otsa boyish, chy o mnye nye stoyish? Otsa she nye boyim, a o tebe stoyim, Lyem she zlykh yazykokh, ey, nayvetsey boyim.	Translation Hey, lad, hey, lad, why won't you come to us? Are you still afraid of father, or do you not care for me? I'm not still afraid of father, but I care for you, Only the evil tongues, hey, I fear the most.

It is interesting that a similar plot is also found in several versions of this song recorded in Lemkivshchyna, particularly by Michael Hayvoronsky and Orest Hyzha:

Original Яничку, златовлас, Чом не ходиш до нас? Ци ся мами боїш, Ци о мя не стоїш? Мами ся не бою І о тебе стою. Лем ся преокрутні Злих язиків бою.	Latinisation Yanychku, zlatovlas, Chom ne khodysh do nas? Tsy sya mamy boyish, Tsy o mya ne stoyish? Mamy sya ne boyu I o tebe stoyu. Lem sya preokrutni Zlykh yazykiv boyu.	Translation Golden-haired Yanychko, Why don't you come to us? Are you afraid of mother, Or do you not care for me? I'm not afraid of mother, And I care for you. Only I fear The evil tongues.

=== Modern times ===
Modern performance

The song, with its most widely known authentic text today, is included in the collection "Lemko Songs" («Лемківські співанки») (Muzychna Ukraina, 1967) compiled and edited by Mykhailo Sobolevsky. Mykhailo Sobolevsky was born in 1886 in the village of Kostarowce, Sanok County, now Poland. Before World War I, he worked as a conductor of a church choir. From then on, he began collecting and recording Lemko folk songs. After the expulsion of the Lemkos from their ethnic lands, Sobolevsky lived in Ukraine. Upon his retirement in 1959, he decided to process and publish the songs he had collected. It is believed that the song "Oy Vershe Miy, Vershe" was recorded by him in his native village of Kostarowce. Following the publication of the collection, the song became the signature piece of the "Cheremosh" song and dance ensemble of Ivan Franko National University of Lviv.

The most common version of the text
Lemko Ukrainian Ой, верше мій, верше, Мій зелений верше, Юж мі так не буде, Як мі било перше. Бо перше мі било, Барз мі добре било, Од своєй мамички, Не ходити било. Не ходити било, Куди я ходила, Не любити било, Кого я любила. Не ходити било Горами, стежками, Не любити хлопця З чорними бровами.	Latinisation Oy, vershe miy, vershe, Miy zelenyy vershe, Yuzh mi tak ne bude, Yak mi bylo pershe. Bo pershe mi bylo, Barz mi dobre bylo, Od svoyey mamychky, Ne khodyty bylo. Ne khodyty bylo, Kudy ya khodyla, Ne lyubyty bylo, Koho ya lyubyla. Ne khodyty bylo Horamy, stezhkamy, Ne lyubyty khloptsya Z chornymy brovamy.	Translation Oh mountain, my mountain My green mountain. It will never be to me As it was before. For as it seemed to me before, It was so good to me From my mother's time It was not to be any longer. No longer walking Where I used to go, No longer loving Whom I used to love. No longer walking Through mountains, paths, No longer loving The boy with black eyebrows.

The song gained its widest popularity after being performed by Kvitka Cisyk in a modern arrangement. After that, it was included in the repertoire of many Ukrainian performers and is often performed at various song festivals and competitions. In particular, Jamala won first place in the "New Wave" competition, and Lucina Khvorost won the first prize of the "International Competition of Ukrainian Romance named after Kvitka Cisyk" with this song. Eight-year-old Ukrainian girl Maria Volovod Christodoulidou won with it at the international children's talent competition "Eurokids".

The song "Oy Vershe Miy, Vershe" is one of the most popular on singing TV shows, including "X-Factor" and "Holos Krainy". Numerous artists have performed the song, including Illaria, Tonya Matvienko, the Tryoda band, Dmytro Babak, Yulia Plaksina, Tetiana Shirko, Anna Kuksa, and many others. In the superfinal of "Holos Krainy 7", Anna Kuksa, accompanied by the "Kiev Tango Project" ensemble, performed "Oy Vershe" in a tango arrangement. The folk song "Oy Vershe Miy, Vershe" by Illaria, was selected for a commercial promoting "Lvivske Zhyve" beer. A video featuring this version of the song was released in late 2010. Director Fedir Stryhun incorporated the song "Oy Vershe Miy, Vershe" performed by The Telnyuk Sisters as a lyrical theme for the play "Stolen Happiness" at the Maria Zankovetska National Academic Theater of Lviv. The song is also featured in the plays "Mystery of Being" («Таїна буття») based on a play by Tetyana Ivashchenko and "Elegy Styx" («Елегія Стікс») directed by Oleksandr Korol at the Lviv First Ukrainian Theater for Children and Youth and the Drohobych Music and Drama Theater, respectively. The song is included in the musical "Kvitka" («Квітка») by the Konstantin Pinchuk "Classikal Grand Ballet" theater.

=== Other known performers ===
The song is widely known in choral arrangements by: Michael Hayvoronsky, Tadeusz Chachaj, Yevhen Kozak, Jaroslaw Polanski, Yaroslav Yaroslavenko, Dmytro Katsal. Has been part of the repertoire of Zakarpattian Folk Choir, "Beskyd" Lemko Choral Chapel (Ivano-Frankivsk), "Lemkovyna" People's Choral Chapel of the village of Rudno, "Dudaryk" Choral Chapel, "Yevshan" Halych Chamber Choir, Miro Skala, Hanna Sherey, Baiko Sisters, Lesia Matskiv.

== Recordings ==
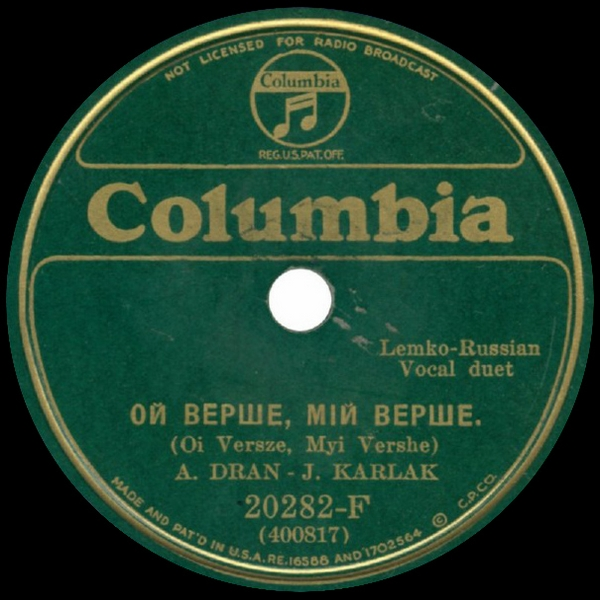
Record Cover of the Duet of Anna Dran and Joanna Karlyak (1928)

"A Vershe Miy Vershe" from the phonographic collection of Osyp Rozdolskyi, recorded in 1912)

Duet of Anna Dran and Joanna Karliak (recorded in 1928)

External audio
- Eugenia Zareska – Oy Vershe Miy, Vershe
- "Yevshan" Halych Chamber Choir, arr. by Michael Hayvoronsky
- Baiko Sisters
- "Lemkovyna" Ensemble
- "Kychera" Ensemble

Year	Performers	Title	Location	Details / Notes
1912	Various Artists	"Ей Боже Боже нич не маме", "Ей як от тале піду", "А верше мій верше", "Наша хата білена" (A medley including "Oy Vershe Miy, Vershe")	Ropica Górna, Poland	Phono cylinder record No. 445 (XXIII) from phonographic collection of Osyp Rozdolskyi; Reissued on CD in 2011
1928	Anna Dran (soprano), Joanna Karliak (alto)	За горами, за лісами / Ой верше, мій верше (Za horamy, za lisamy / Oi Versze, Myi Vershe)	New York City, US	Victor Hladyk (manager); Track:"Ой верше, мій верше" ("Oi Versze, Myi Vershe"); Label: Columbia / 20282-F
1956	Eugenia Zareska	Ukrainian Songs	USA	Orchestra directed by Jacques Belasco; Track B3: "Oy, Vershe Miy, Vershe"; Label: Urania Records – US 5137
1956	Baiko Sisters	Червоні маки / Ой верше, мій верше (Red Poppies / Oy Vershe Miy, Vershe)	UkrSSR	Track B: "Ой, Верше Мiй, Верше"; Label: Factory of Household Appliances of Zhytomyr; 78 rpm record, 27602-03
1960	Miro Skala (tenor)	Melodies Of Ukraine	Canada	Piano accompaniment by Jeannine Lacour; Track B2: "O, My Mountain Top"; Label: London MLP 10037
1960	Baiko Sisters (trio)	Українські пісні (Ukrainian Songs)	Lviv, UkrSSR	Track 3: "Oi vershe mi, vershe"; Label: Melodiya – D 6499–6500
1965	Hanna Sherey (mezzo-soprano)	Ой верше мій, верше (Oy Vershe Miy, Vershe)	New York, USA	Piano accompaniment by Kalyna Chichka-Andriyenko.; Recorded at a concert for Ukrainian composers in exile.
1965	O. Nikolishyna, R. Korobkina, N. Fomenko, M. Bayko (quartet)	Ой верше мій, верше (Oy Vershe Miy, Vershe)	UkrSSR	Arranged by Yevhen Kozak; Central State Film, Photo and Phonoarchives of Ukraine
1970	Kvitka Cisyk	Ivanku and Other Favorite Songs of Young Ukrainians	New York, USA	Track A5: "My High Mountain"; Label: Midney – P-0102
1986	"Lemkovyna" Ensemble	Співає «Лемковина» ("Lemkovyna" Ensemble Singing)	UkrSSR	Track B1: "Ой Верше Мій, Верше"; Arranged by Yaroslav Yaroslavenko; Label: Melodiya C30 23677 005
1989	Kvitka Cisyk	Two Colors	USA & Canada	Track 10: "Верше, мій верше" ("I Sing to the Hills"); Label: KMC Records – KMC 1002 CD
1998	"Kychera" Ensemble	Цне мі ся за тобов (I Miss You So Much)	Poland	Track 29: "Oj, Wersze Mij, Wersze"; Solo: Piotr Hojniak, Michal Olesniewicz; CD
2000	Julia Doszna	Там на Лемковині (There in Lemkovyna)	Poland	Track 7: "Ой Верше Мій Верше"; Label: Towarzystwo Karpackie
2002	Svitlana Damyduk and "Budmo!" Ensemble	Гей, музики, довше грайте (Hey, Musicians, Play Longer)	Ukraine	Track 4: "Верше"("Vershe"); Label: Taki Sparavy – CDND 0616/02
2004	Anytchka	Силою любові... (By the Power of Love...)	Ukraine	Track B2: "Ой верше, мій верше"; Label: Alfa-Omega
2005	"Yevshan" Hutsul Chamber Choir	Фольклорна скриня (Folklore Trunk)	Ukraine	Track 3: "Ой, Верше Мій, Верше"; Label: Same Tak!
2007	"Rushnychok" Ensemble	Сусідка (The Neighbor Girl)	Ukraine	Track 6: "Ой Верше, Мій Верше" ("A Song to the Hill"); Label: Origen Music
2008	Hudaki	Гудаки не люди (Hudaki are Not People)	Ukraine	Track 9: "Vershe"; CD
2008	Dudaryk Nazavzhdy	Мамине серце (Mother's Heart)	Ukraine	Track 13: "Ой, верше ж мій, верше"; Label: Nash Format
2008	Tafubar	Changeability	Germany	Track 1: "Mij Vershe" (feat. Svitlana Damyduk); Label: Lemongrassmusic
2010	"Soli Deo" (choir)	Співає (Sings)	Ukraine	Track 15: "Oy Vershe Miy, Vershe"; Label: Nash Format CD
2010	Illaria	Вільна (Free)	Ukraine	Track 15: "Ой верше мій, верше"; Label: Rostok Records
2011	Jamala	For Every Heart	Ukraine	Bonus Track 15: "Верше, Мій Верше"; Label: Moon Records – MR 5117-2 CD
2014	Halyna Barankevych	Вигнані з Раю / лемківські пісні (Expelled from Paradise / Lemko Songs)	Ukraine	Track 14: "Ой, Верше мій, Верше"; Label: Kosmata design
2014	Trioda	Душа українського народу (Soul of the Ukrainian People)	Ukraine	Track 4: "Ой верше мій верше"; Label: V Studio
2014	Lucina Khvorost	Солодко-гіркий романс (Bittersweet Romance)	Ukraine	Bonus track 19: "Ой верше мій, верше"; Label: Nash Format, МА
2017	Laboratorium Pieśni	Rosna	Poland	Track 1: "Oj Wersze, Mij Wersze"; Label: Soliton SL 785-2D

== Films ==
- Documentary film "Oy Vershe Miy, Vershe" («Ой верше, мій верше»). Director Valentyn Sperkach, Ukrkinohronika 1984. (Film about the life of Lemko Ukrainians living in the Velykyi Bereznyi district of Zakarpattia Oblast)

== Song on SoundCloud ==
- Dudaryk on SoundCloud
- The Telnyuk Sisters on SoundCloud
- Sofiia Fedyna on SoundCloud
- Lucina Khvorost on SoundCloud
- Laboratorium Pieśni on SoundCloud
- Rushnychok on SoundCloud
