= 1944 (disambiguation) =

1944 was a leap year starting on Saturday of the Gregorian calendar. It may also refer to:

- 1944 (film), a 2015 Estonian film
- 1944 (album), a 2016 album by Jamala
  - "1944" (song), a song performed by Jamala
- 1944 (EP), an EP by Soul-Junk
- 1944: The Final Defence, a 2007 Finnish film
- 1944: The Loop Master, a 2000 vertical scrolling shooter arcade game
