= 1944 (song) =

2016 song by Jamala

Single by Jamala

from the album 1944
- Released: 5 February 2016
- Recorded: 2015
- Length: 3:00
- Label: Enjoy
- Composer: Jamala
- Lyricists: Art Antonyan; Jamala

Jamala singles chronology
| "Breath" (2015) | "1944" (2016) | "Zamanyly" (2016) |

Music video
- "1944" on YouTube

Eurovision Song Contest 2016 entry
- Country: Ukraine
- Artist: Jamala
- Languages: English, Crimean Tatar
- Composer: Jamala
- Lyricists: Art Antonyan; Jamala

Finals performance
- Semi-final result: 2nd
- Semi-final points: 287
- Final result: 1st
- Final points: 534

Entry chronology
- ◄ "Tick-Tock" (2014)
- "Time" (2017) ►

Official performance video
- "1944" (Semi-final) on YouTube "1944" (Final) on YouTube "1944" (Reprise) on YouTube

"1944" is a song composed and recorded by the Ukrainian musician Jamala, with it including lyrics by both her and performer Art Antonyan. It represented Ukraine in the Eurovision Song Contest 2016, and the song won the event with a total of 534 points.

In May 2022, the British news publication The Independent named the song as the twentieth best Eurovision-winning song and opined that its "melancholic" approach "works perfectly". As well, in 2023, The Guardian ranked the song as the third best Eurovision winner in history. An official music video was released on 21 September 2016.

In terms of its lyrics and general production, the song describes the discriminatory persecution of the Crimean Tatars in the context of Joseph Stalin's rule over the Soviet Union. These violent military actions, which resulted in numerous deaths, had personally endangered Jamala's grandparents, which influenced the piece's emotional tone and its other attributes. Jamala summed the release up as a musical "memorial". It notably mixes together vocals in both the English language and the Crimean Tatar language.

== Background ==
=== Conception and lyrics ===
"1944" was composed and recorded by Jamala. The English lyrics were written by the poet Art Antonyan. The song's chorus, in the Crimean Tatar language, is made up of words from a Crimean Tatar folk song called Ey Güzel Qırım that Jamala had heard from her great-grandmother, reflecting on the loss of a youth which could not be spent in her homeland. The song features the duduk played by Aram Kostanyan and the use of the Azerbaijani mugham vocal style.

The lyrics for "1944" concern the deportation of the Crimean Tatars, in the 1940s, by the Soviet Union at the hands of Joseph Stalin on the pretext of their alleged collaboration with Nazi Germany. Jamala was particularly inspired by the story of her great-grandmother Nazylkhan, who was in her mid-20s when she and her five children were deported to Central Asia. One of the daughters did not survive the journey. Jamala's great-grandfather was fighting in World War II in the Red Army at this time and thus could not protect his family. The song was also released amid renewed repression of Crimean Tatars following the Russian annexation of Crimea, since most Crimean Tatars refuse to accept the annexation.

=== National selection ===
The National Television Company of Ukraine (NTU) withdrew from the 2015 edition of the Eurovision Song Contest, citing costs. After deciding to return to the 2016 contest, a selection process to determine its representative was opened, combining resources from NTU –renamed as the Public Broadcasting Company of Ukraine (UA:PBC)– and private broadcaster STB. "1944" by Jamala was announced as one of the eighteen competing acts in the 2016 edition of Natsionalnyi Vidbir, the national final for Eurovision. She performed the song in the first semi-final on 6 February 2016, where it won both the jury and televote, advancing to the Ukrainian final. In the final, on 21 February, it was placed second by the jury and first by the televote, resulting in a tie with "Helpless" by the Hardkiss. "1944" was announced as the winner, however, as the televoting acted as a tiebreaker. It received 37.77% of more than 382,000 televotes. It became the Ukrainian entrant for Eurovision.

=== Accusations of politicisation ===
In a February 2016 interview with The Guardian, Jamala said that the song also reminded her of her own family living in Crimea nowadays, claiming that since the 2014 Russian annexation of Crimea "the Crimean Tatars are on occupied territory". (Note: Crimea is currently de facto controlled by Russia, after a controversial Self-Determination referendum.) The song lyrics, however, do not address this annexation. Eurovision rules prohibit songs with lyrics that could be interpreted as having "political content".

Immediately after the selection of this song, some Russian politicians, as well as authorities in Crimea, accused the Ukrainian authorities of "capitalising on the tragedy of the Tatars to impose on European viewers a false picture of alleged harassment of the Tatars in the Russian Crimea". (Note: Russian MP Vadim Dengin of the far-right LDPR believed the song's victory was fixed because "Most of the citizens of Ukraine who do not receive any salary or pensions have nothing to pay for electricity, and secondly, they do not care about this Eurovision". He also expressed hope that the song would be banned from participation by Eurovision.)

On 9 March 2016, a tweet from the European Broadcasting Union (EBU) confirmed that neither the title nor the lyrics of the song contained "political speech" and therefore it did not breach any Eurovision rule, thus allowing it to remain in the competition.

=== Eurovision ===
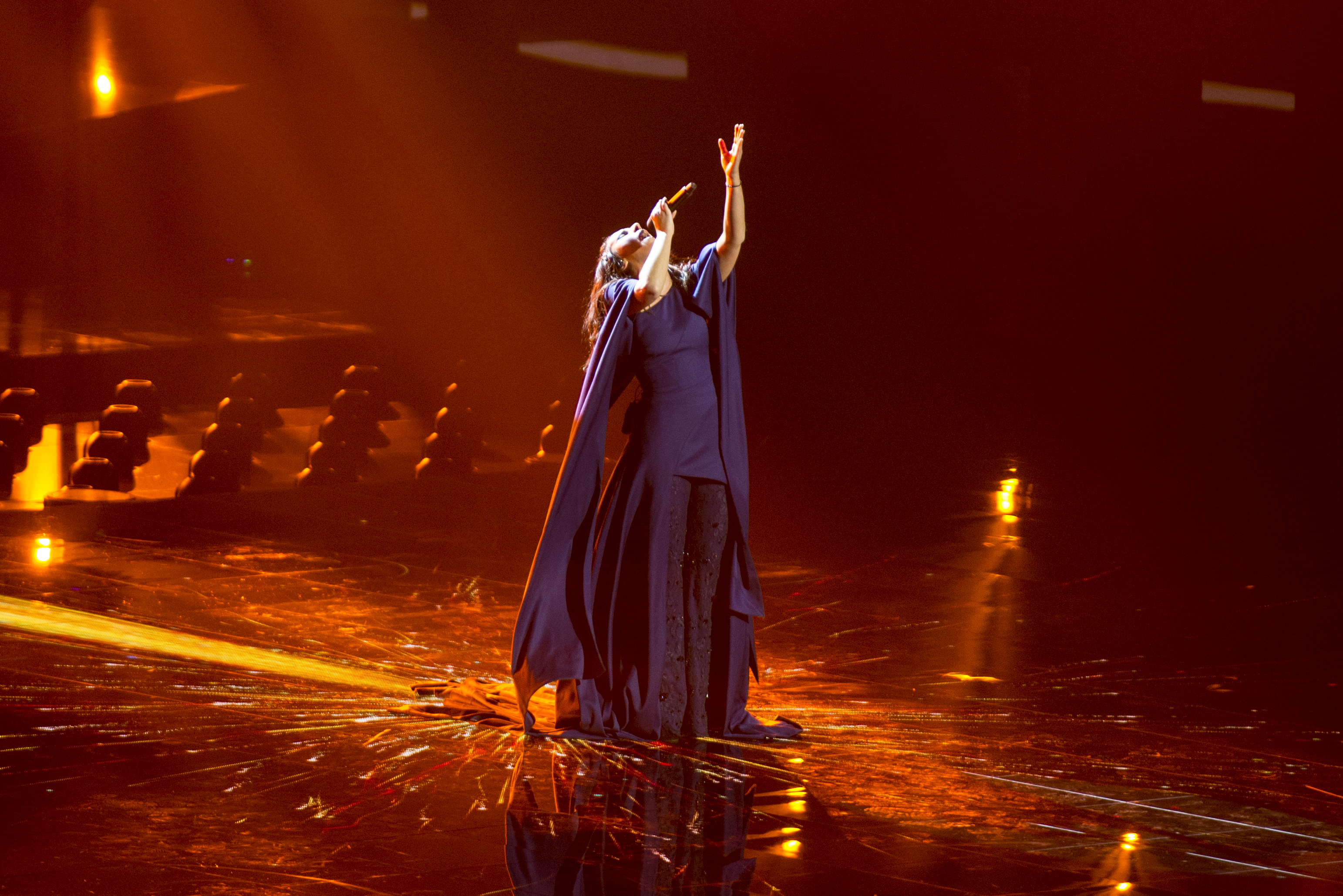
Jamala performing "1944" in Eurovision

On 12 May 2016, the second semi-final of the Eurovision Song Contest was held in the Globe Arena in Stockholm hosted by Sveriges Television (SVT) and broadcast live throughout the continent. Jamala performed "1944" fourteenth on the evening. After the grand final it was revealed that it had received in its semi-final 287 points, placing second and qualifying for the grand final. On 14 May 2016, she performed the song again in the grand final twenty-first on the evening. "1944" is the first Eurovision song to contain lyrics in the Crimean language.

It won the final, receiving the second highest televoting score and second highest jury vote, with a total of 534 points, officially surpassing the previous record set by "Fairytale" by Alexander Rybak in 2009, which won with 387 points. (Note: Because of the new scoring system, however, with separate sets of televotes and jury votes, the results are not directly comparable with each other, as the number of points was limited to 492 in previous contest. With the current system, the score of "Fairytale" would have been 690.) The national juries voted "Sound of Silence" by Dami Im for Australia first with 320 points, and the televote voted "You Are the Only One" by Sergey Lazarev for Russia first with 361 points. The televoting result for Ukraine, of 323 points, however, was sufficient, when added to their jury score of 211 points, to put them in first place, with a grand total of 534 points, leaving Australia second and Russia third.

=== Aftermath ===
As the winning broadcaster, the EBU gave UA:PBC the responsibility to host the following edition of the Eurovision Song Contest. The interval act of the first semi-final on 9 May 2017 features Jamala performing "1944" and "Zamanyly".

== Critical reception ==
Prior to the Ukrainian national selection finals, "1944" received 8.33 out of 10 points from a jury of Eurovision blog Wiwibloggs, the highest score among the six finalists in the Ukrainian national selection.

In 2023, The Guardian recognized the song as the third best Eurovision winner, emphasizing on the meaningful lyrics and calling the song "authentically fantastic" and "moodily atmospheric".

== Track listing ==
Digital download
| No. | Title | Length |
|---|---|---|
| 1. | "1944" | 3:00 |

Digital download – EP
| No. | Title | Length |
|---|---|---|
| 1. | "1944" | 3:00 |
| 2. | "Watch Over Me" | 5:47 |
| 3. | "Hate Love" | 3:46 |
| 4. | "I'm Like a Bird" | 3:33 |
| 5. | "Thank You" | 3:22 |
| Total length: | | 19:28 |

== Chart history ==
=== Weekly charts ===
| Chart (2016) | Peak position |
|---|---|
| Austria (Ö3 Austria Top 40) | 54 |
| Belgium (Ultratip Bubbling Under Flanders) | 13 |
| Finland Airplay (Radiosoittolista) | 64 |
| France (SNEP) | 49 |
| Hungary (Single Top 40) | 40 |
| Russia (TopHit) | 129 |
| Spain (Promusicae) | 32 |
| Sweden (Sverigetopplistan) | 46 |
| Switzerland (Schweizer Hitparade) | 73 |
| Ukraine (Tophit Ukraine Charts) | 2 |

| Chart (2022) | Peak position |
|---|---|
| Lithuania (AGATA) | 8 |

== Release history ==
| Region | Date | Format | Label |
|---|---|---|---|
| Worldwide | 12 February 2016 | Digital download | Enjoy |

== See also ==
- Electronic music
- History of Ukraine in the Eurovision Song Contest

| Preceded by "Heroes" by Måns Zelmerlöw | Eurovision Song Contest winners 2016 | Succeeded by "Amar pelos dois" by Salvador Sobral |
