= Olga Dubchak =

Olga Petrivna Dubchak
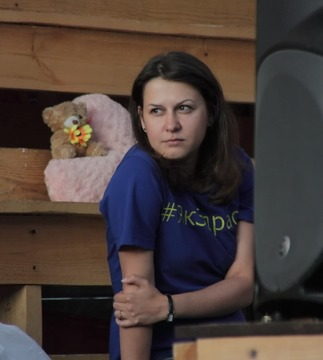
- Born: 10 December 1983 (age 42); Kyiv, Ukraine
- Citizenship: Ukrainian American
- Education: National Pedagogical Dragomanov University
- Occupations: Editor‑in‑chief and co‑founder of Vikhola Publishing House, literary editor

Olga Petrivna Dubchak (born 10 December 1983) is a Ukrainian writer and literary editor. She is co‑founder and editor‑in‑chief of the publishing house Vikhola. She is the author of popular‑science books Hearing in Ukrainian, Seeing in Ukrainian, Winning in Ukrainian, and Being in Ukrainian.

== Early life ==
Olga Dubchak was born on 10 December 1983 in Kyiv. Her mother is from Cherkasy and her father is from Kyiv (Kurenivka district). Her husband is Artem Mozhovyi, a senior researcher at the National Academy of Sciences of Ukraine. She grew up in a predominantly Russian‑speaking family, but her parents enrolled her in a Ukrainian‑language school.

She studied journalism courses with the encouragement of her parents.

After high school, she enrolled at M. P. Dragomanov National Pedagogical University, majoring in Ukrainian philology with a focus on literary editing.

== Career ==
Dubchak began working as an editor of educational literature (Ukrainian section) at publishing house Geneza. She taught for a period. She was eventually promoted to head of the editorial department. While at Geneza, in 2010 Dubchak co‑authored a school textbook with Valentyna Novosiolova and others titled Ukrainian Language. Express‑Tutor for External Independent Testing Preparation. Phonetics. Graphics. Orthoepy. Lexicology. Phraseology. Word structure. Word formation.

She later joined publisher Nash Format as editor‑in‑chief. At Nash Format, when ordered by the owner to prepare a manuscript by a Russian scientist for publication, Dubchak resigned. Subsequently, the entire editorial team resigned.

In 2020, Dubchak, Ilona Zamotsna, Natalia Shnyr, Maryna Zakharchuk, Iryna Shchepina, and Viktoriia Shelest founded Vikhola, where she works as editor‑in‑chief. In 2022, with Vikhola as the only authorial presence, she took on writing the popular science book Hearing in Ukrainian. She followed with Seeing in Ukrainian. She planned a trilogy on the Ukrainian language, with the final installment focused on syntax, interrupted by the Russian invasion of Ukraine in 2022. In 2022, she symbolically authored Winning in Ukrainian, which was included in PEN Ukraine's list of best Ukrainian books of 2022.

== Works ==
=== Popular‑science books ===
- Hearing in Ukrainian. In the World of Sounds and Letters (2020)
- Seeing in Ukrainian. Word in the Linguistic Picture of the World (2021)
- Winning in Ukrainian. On the Language of Hate and Love (2022)
- Being in Ukrainian. Sentence and Its Marks (2025)
- Heart with Pepper. Ukrainian Phraseologisms for Daily Use (2023)

=== School textbook ===
- Ukrainian Language. Express–Tutor for External Independent Evaluation. Phonetics. Graphics. Orthoepy. Lexicology. Phraseology. Morphology. Word‑Formation (2010)

== Recognition ==
- Hearing in Ukrainian became a bestseller in 2021 according to Chytomo.
