= I Got Love =

I Got Love may refer to:

- I Got Love (album), a 1970 album by Melba Moore
- "I Got Love" (Miyagi song), 2016
- "I Got Love" (Nate Dogg song), 2001
- "I Got Love" (Taeyeon song), 2017
