= For Every Heart =

For Every Heart may refer to:

- For Every Heart (Jamala album), 2011
- For Every Heart (Twila Paris album), 1988
- For Every Heart, a 1984 album by Diane Reeves
