= Zamanyly =

2016 song by Jamala and DakhaBrakha

Single by Jamala and DakhaBrakha
- Released: 4 November 2016
- Recorded: 2016
- Genre: Ethno-chaos
- Length: 3:21
- Label: Enjoy! Records

Jamala singles chronology
"1944" (2016)	"Zamanyly" (2016)	"I Believe in U" (2017)

"Zamanyly" (Ukrainian: «Заманили») is a song by Ukrainian singer Jamala and Ukrainian folk quartet DakhaBrakha. It was released as a digital download in Ukraine on 4 November 2016 by Enjoy! Records. The song has charted in Russia and Ukraine.

== Track listing ==
Digital download
No.	Title	Length
1.	"Zamanyly (Заманили)"	3:21
2.	"Zamanyly (Заманили)" (Morphom version)	3:24

== Charts ==
Chart (2016)	Peak position
Russia (TopHit)	199

== Release history ==
Region	Date	Format	Label
Ukraine	4 November 2016	Digital download	Enjoy! Records
