= Ey Güzel Qırım =

Crimean Tatar folk song

Ey, güzel Qırım (Crimean Tatar: «Ey, güzel Qırım», lit. ''Oh, Beautiful Crimea'') is a famous Crimean Tatar folk song. Its melody is universally recognized among Crimean Tatars, and is frequently played in Crimean Tatar concerts. The sorrowful lyrics mourn a life of exile and grieve over the loss of a beloved homeland. The origin of the song is unclear, but it is believed that it was composed anonymously sometime after the deportation of the Crimean Tatars. However, there are unconfirmed allegations that it was written during a visit to Alushta in 1968 by Fatma Halilova and Shurki Osmanov - Crimean Tatars who were exiled to Andijan. A small portion of the song that did not contain the word "Crimea" was incorporated into Jamala's song "1944" when she represented Ukraine in the Eurovision Song Contest 2016 and won.

== Lyrics ==
=== Original version ===
Crimean Tatar (Latin alphabet)

Aluştadan esken yeller
Yüzüme urdı.
Balalıqtan ösken yerler
Közüme tüşti.

Men bu yerde yaşalmadım,
Yaşlığıma toyalmadım,
Vatanıma asret oldım,
Ey, güzel Qırım.

Bağçalarnıñ (Note: Also sung as Bahçelerin/Бахчелерин) meyvaları,
Bal ile şerbet.
Suvlarıñnı içe-içe,
Toyalmadım men.

Bala-çağa Vatanım dep,
Közyaşın töke,
Qartlarımız elin cayıp,
Dualar ete.

Crimean Tatar (Cyrillic alphabet)

Алуштадан эскен йеллер
Юзюме урды.
Балалыкътан оскен йерлер
Козюме тюшти.

Мен бу йерде яшылмадым,
Йашлыгъыма тойалмадым,
Ватаныма асрет олдым,
Эй, Гюзел Къырым.

Багъчаларнынъ мейвалары
Бал иле шербет
Сувларынъны иче-иче
Тойалмадым мен.

Бала-чагъа Ватаным деп,
Кёзйашын тёке,
Къартларымыз элин джайып
Дуалар эте.

=== Russian and Ukrainian version by S. Dzhemilova ===
Russian

Ветра дующие из Алушты
Почувствовал на своём лице
Родные места детства
Предстали перед глазами

На родной земле я не жил
Молодым я вдоволь не был
я по Родине тосковал,
О, прекрасный Крым!

Здесь растут сады и фрукты,
Здесь шербет и мёд,
Не напьюсь водою чистой,
Что в Крыму течёт

Не жила в родных местах я,
Радость юности не знала,
Я по Родине скучала,
О, прекрасный Крым!

Скажут «Родина» — детишки
Сразу слёзы льют,
Старики простерши руки
Всё молитвы шлют…

На родной земле я не жил,
Молодым я вдоволь не был,
Я по Родине тоскую,
Мой прекрасный Крым!

Не жила в родных местах я,
Радость юности не знала,
Я по Родине скучала,
Мой прекрасный Крым!

Ukrainian

Вітру, що дме з Алушти
Відчув на своєму обличчі
Рідні місця дитинства
З'явилися перед очима

На рідній землі я не жив
Молодим я вдосталь не був
я по Батьківщині сумував,
О, чудовий Крим!

Тут ростуть сади та фрукти,
Тут шербет та мед,
Не нап'юся чистою водою,
Що в Криму тече

Не жила в рідних місцях я,
Радість юності не знала,
Я за Батьківщиною сумувала,
О, чудовий Крим!

Скажуть «Батьківщина» — дітлахи
Відразу сльози ллють,
Старі простягши руки
Всі молитви шлють…

На рідній землі я не жив,
Молодим я вдосталь не був,
Я по Батьківщині сумую,
Мій чудовий Крим!

Не жила в рідних місцях я,
Радість юності не знала,
Я за Батьківщиною сумувала,
Мій чудовий Крим!

=== Translation ===
Winds that blow in Alushta,
Hits my face,
Filling my eyes with tears
In the land of my fathers

I could not live in this land,
I could not enjoy my youth,
I'm longing for my homeland,
Oh, beautiful Crimea!

Fruits of the garden,
Are like honey and sherbet,
No matter how much I drink its waters,
It's not enough for me.

Kids will say homeland,
Immediately tears pour,
Old men stretch out their hands
And send all their prayers.
