= Vitalii Sediuk =

Ukrainian nuisance (born 1988)

- Віталій Седюк
- Born: 14 November 1988 (age 38); Boryspil, Kyiv Oblast, Ukrainian SSR, Soviet Union

Vitalii Mykolayovych Sediuk (Ukrainian: Віталій Миколайович Седюк; born 14 November 1988) is a Ukrainian self-described prankster. He was formerly a media reporter.

He has physically and/or sexually assaulted a number of celebrities at events such as film premieres and awards ceremonies. On several of these occasions, he has gained access to otherwise restricted areas with the use of press credentials from his former employer, Ukrainian TV channel 1+1. In interviews, he has denied his conduct amounts to stalking and has stated he is not "crazy".

== Celebrity assaults incidents ==
=== 2012–2014 ===
- On 18 May 2012, Sediuk kissed Will Smith at the premiere of Men in Black 3 in Moscow, prompting Smith to slap him and ask "What the hell is your problem, man?" Sediuk was attempting to interview Smith at the time he kissed him.
- On 10 February 2013, Sediuk, who had no ticket or credential, rushed onto the stage during the 2013 Grammy Awards, when Adele received her award for best solo performance, and "murmured" into the microphone, which The Hollywood Reporter later described as "a moment broadcast around the world but noticed by very few." As a result of the incident, Sediuk was charged with "willfully leaving a spectator area and entering a performance area" and of "interfering and delaying program participants." He pled no contest and was given a six-month suspended sentence.
- On 24 February 2013, Sediuk attempted to enter the 85th Academy Awards wearing drag, but was turned back by security before reaching the red carpet.
- On 18 January 2014, Sediuk grabbed Bradley Cooper around the legs at the 20th Screen Actors Guild Awards. According to USA Today, "Cooper did his best to smile through the incident as he pulled the man off of his legs."
- On 6 February 2014, Sediuk rushed Leonardo DiCaprio at the Santa Barbara International Film Festival, briefly burying his face in DiCaprio's groin before being removed by security.
- On 16 May 2014, at the 2014 Cannes Film Festival, Sediuk crawled under the gown of America Ferrera as she posed for photographs at the premiere of How to Train Your Dragon 2. Ferrera was reportedly "shaken" by the incident, and some called for Sediuk to be charged with sexual assault. In the aftermath of that episode, Sediuk was fired by 1+1.

==== Brad Pitt incident ====
On 28 May 2014, Sediuk was arrested by Los Angeles police after running onto the red carpet at the premiere of Maleficent at the El Capitan Theater and making contact with Brad Pitt, breaking the actor's glasses. Though apparently unharmed, Pitt cut short autograph signing after the attack and was granted an emergency restraining order against Sediuk. Initial stories reported that Sediuk had punched Pitt in the face, though a statement Pitt made in the aftermath of the attack provided different details:

I was at the end of the line signing autographs, when out the corner of my eye I saw someone stage-diving over the barrier at me. I took a step back; this guy had latched onto my lapels. I looked down and the nutter was trying to bury his face in my crotch, so I cracked him twice in the back of the head -- not too hard -- but enough to get his attention, because he did let go. I think he was then just grabbing for a hand hold because the guys were on him, and he reached up and caught my glasses.

In the aftermath of the attack, prosecutors announced they would seek an unprecedented court order banning Sediuk from any events connected with the entertainment industry in Los Angeles.

Sediuk was held in the Los Angeles County Men's Central Jail after failing to post $20,000 bail, and was indicted on 30 May 2014 on charges of assault and battery. Sediuk was also charged with unlawful activity at a sporting, theatrical event, or exhibition, relating to his 2013 Oscars stunt, and prosecution for which had been deferred at the time of the incident on condition of his good behavior for three years. Sediuk pled no contest to all charges and was sentenced to 20 days of community service, $440 in court costs, and ordered to undergo psychological counseling for one year.

=== 2014–2017 ===
- On 25 September 2014, Sediuk allegedly shoved Kim Kardashian, nearly forcing her to the ground if not for the assistance of her bodyguard, Pascal Duvier, as she was exiting a limousine - along with her then-husband Kanye West, and mother Kris Jenner - to enter the Balmain Fashion Show at Le Grand Hôtel in Paris, France, to watch her sister, Kendall Jenner, as she modeled. While Sediuk's involvement was inconclusive initially, it was confirmed following a statement released by Sediuk, noting, "I hope Kim is ok and won’t be mad at me as I didn’t mean any harm. Kanye is one lucky man as Kim is a goddess!"
- On 30 September 2014, Sediuk rushed the crowd at Valentino's Paris Fashion Week Show, stripped down to a G-string thong and hugged Ciara before he was pulled away. He was not charged for the incident.
- On 7 October 2015, while Miranda Kerr attended the Louis Vuitton runway show in Paris, Sediuk snuck up and kissed her on the cheek.
- On 21 September 2016, after a fashion show in Milan, Sediuk snuck up behind model Gigi Hadid and lifted her off the ground, before being elbowed in the face by Hadid. After the incident, he confirmed to The Hollywood Reporter that it was indeed him; he claims his motives behind the attack were due to his belief that Hadid is not a true high fashion model.
- On 28 September 2016, Kim Kardashian was arriving at L'Avenue restaurant when Sediuk ran over and tried to kiss Kardashian's butt. The attack was stopped short by her bodyguard, Pascal Duvier.
- On 13 May 2017, while Jamala was performing her song "I Believe in U" at the Eurovision Song Contest 2017 final, Sediuk ran onto the stage draped in an Australian flag and dropped his pants to show his rear end. Sediuk was fined ₴8,500 (approximately €284) for the incident.

=== 2019–present ===
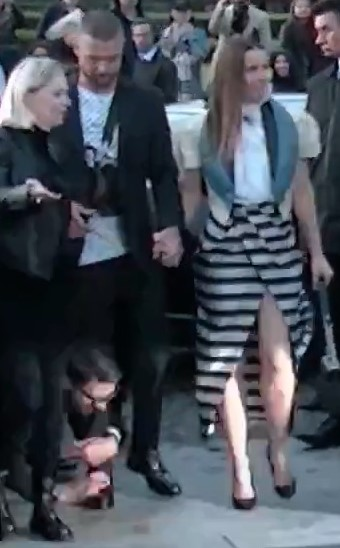
Sediuk grabbing Justin Timberlake with Jessica Biel at 2019 Louis Vuitton Show at Paris Fashion Week

- On 1 October 2019, Sediuk ambushed the 2019 Louis Vuitton Show at Paris Fashion Week and grabbed Justin Timberlake's right leg as Timberlake just arrived with his wife Jessica Biel. Security guards quickly pulled Sediuk away.

== Reception ==
Sediuk's attacks have been poorly received in United States media. The Los Angeles Times has described his escapades as having "a sinister quality," while The Hollywood Reporter has labeled him "a shameless attention fiend and mischief-maker." In reporting on Sediuk's actions at the Cannes Film Festival, The Huffington Post, while noting that Sediuk calls himself a prankster, asked "Is anyone really laughing?" Vulture has described Sediuk as "Borat without the wit or satire", while Uproxx has called Sediuk a "creep", and The Wire has referred to him as "a reprehensible piece of human garbage".

Non-American press have also given Sediuk a cool reception. The edition of GQ in the United Kingdom has said Sediuk confirms "why Ukrainian comedy has yet to take over the world" and the Toronto Star has referred to him as an "unfunny prankster".

Sediuk's criminal defense attorney, Anthony Willoughby, has defended Sediuk in media reports, and insisted he is not naturally prone to violence. Christa Scherck, a self-described publicist who has previously worked with Sediuk, has echoed Willoughby's assertion that Sediuk is not normally violent, also adding that he "does not have a drug problem", and "is not a pervert", but does have, however, "real issues that need to be dealt with".
