= My (Jamala album) =

Studio album by Jamala
- Released: 12 March 2021
- Studio: Jenny Records (Lviv)
- Genre: Pop; hip-hop
- Length: 32:13
- Language: Ukrainian (1–7); Russian (7); English (8)
- Label: Enjoy! Records
- Producer: Mykola Usatiy; Dmytro Nechepurenko

Jamala chronology
Svoi (2020)	My (2021)	5:45 (2021)

Singles from My
- 1. "Вдячна" Released: 26 February 2021

My (Ми, translated from Ukrainian We) is the fifth studio album by Ukrainian recording artist Jamala, released on 12 March 2021. It contains eight songs in Ukrainian, English, and Russian, written by the singer in collaboration with other songwriters. The album was presented live on 21 October 2021, at the October Palace in Kyiv.

== Background and promotion ==
The album "My" was recorded in the summer of 2020 at the Jenny recording studio in Lviv. Due to quarantine restrictions, the album's release, scheduled for the fall of the same year, was postponed to the following year. Jamala worked on the album in collaboration with Oleksandra Makarovska, Darya Fedorenko, Tetyana Mylymko and Andriy Chmut. The music producers were Mykola Usatiy and Dmytro Nechepurenko.

The album included eight songs in Ukrainian, English and Russian. The song "Kohayu", released as a single in 2019, was originally included in the album "Vykhod v свет" by Kazakh rapper Jah Khalib. "Like A Hero" is a foreign-language version of the song "The Price of Truth", which became the soundtrack to the film Mr. Jones by Polish director Agnieszka Holland. "Grateful" was released as a single on 26 February 2021 in support of the upcoming album.

According to Jamala, the driving force behind the new album is love, strength, gratitude, faith, and forgiveness: "...the leitmotif of almost all the songs is that we need to be grateful, believe in ourselves, believe in our children, so that they can grow into real people".

== Commercial performance ==
After its release on 12 March 2021, the album "My" entered the "Ukraine Top 100 Pop Albums" chart on the Apple Music streaming service. In its second week on the chart, it reached the eighth position.

== Track listing ==
No.	Title	Lyrics	Music	Length
1.	"Вірю в тебе"	S. Jamaladinova, D. Fedorenko	S. Dzhamaladinova, A. Chmut	4:15
2.	"Вдячна"	S. Jamaladinova, D. Fedorenko	S. Dzhamaladinova, O. Makarovska	3:56
3.	"Ми"	S. Jamaladinova, D. Fedorenko	S. Dzhamaladinova, A. Chmut	3:31
4.	"Сила"	S. Dzhamaladinova, D. Fedorenko, T. Mylymko	S. Dzhamaladinova, O. Makarovska	3:48
5.	"Вогонь і вода"	S. Dzhamaladinova, D. Fedorenko, T. Mylymko	S. Dzhamaladinova, A. Chmut	3:55
6.	"Загадка"	S. Dzhamaladinova, D. Fedorenko, T. Mylymko	S. Dzhamaladinova, A. Chmut, D. Nechepurenko	3:57
7.	"Кохаю" (featuring Jah Khalib)	S. Jamaladinova, B. Mamedov, O. Zhvakin	S. Jamaladinova, B. Mamedov	4:38
8.	"Like A Hero"	Z. Zheleznov, O. Makarovska	S. Jamaladinova	4:10
Total length:				32:13

== Release history ==
Country	Date	Label	Format
Ukraine	12 March 2021	Enjoy! Records	Digital download
