= Gayvoronskiy =

Gayvoronskiy (Russian: Гайворонский) or Haivoronsky(i) (Ukrainian: Гайворонський), respective female forms Gayvoronskaya or Haivoronska (Гайворонская, Гайворонська) are Slavic surnames relating to Haivoron, Ukraine and denoting descent from that location.

== Men ==
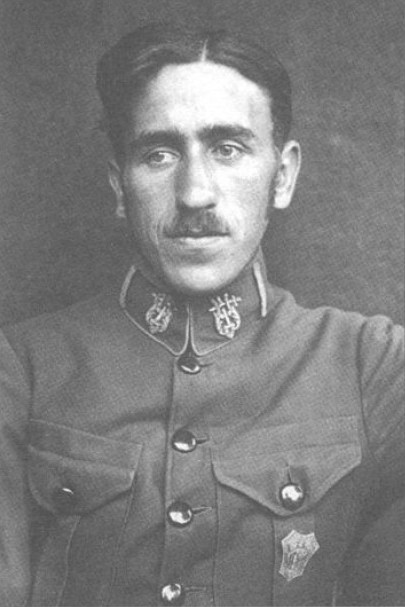
A photograph of Michael Haivoronsky

This is a list of relevant men with the surname Gayvoronskiy or Haivoronsky(i);

- Danila Gayvoronskiy - Soccer Player at FC Forte Taganrog
- Vyacheslav Gayvoronskiy [ru] - Musician and Composer
- Ivan Vasilyevich Gayvoronskiy [ru] - Russian Doctor
- Ivan Ivanovich Gayvoronskiy (Hero of the Soviet Union) [ru] - Ukrainian awarded Hero of the Soviet Union
- Ivan Gayvoronskiy [ru] - Soviet Meteorologist
- Michael Haivoronsky - Ukrainian Composer
- Fedot Gayvoronskiy [ru] - Soviet Colonel-General

== Women ==
This is a list of relevant women with the surname Gayvoronskaya or Haivoronska;

- Anna Haivoronska [uk] - Ukrainian poetess
- Feodosia Gayvoronskaya [ru] - Soviet Agricultural Figure, awarded Hero of the Soviet Union, the Order of Lenin, and the Order of the Red Banner of Labour
