= Miyagi & Andy Panda =

Russian musical duo

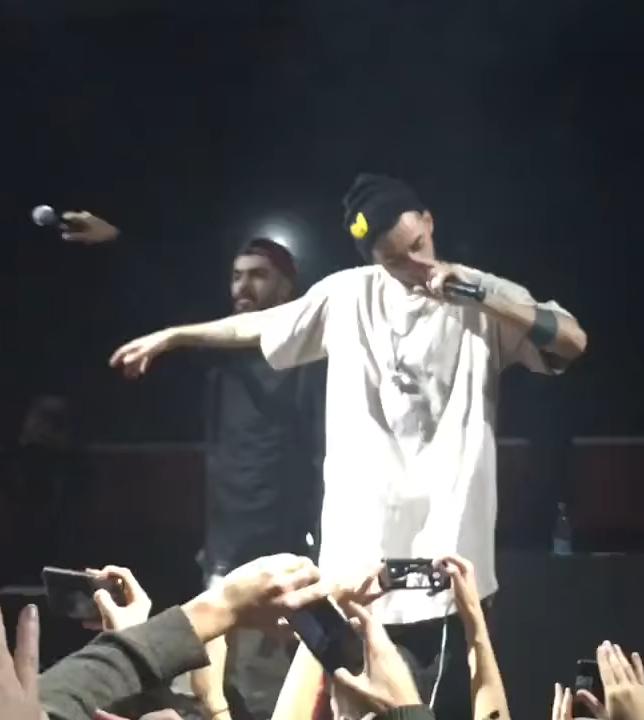
MiyaGi & Эндшпиль during a concert in Moscow in 2016

Miyagi & Endshpil (or MiyaGi & Andy Panda) is a Russian hookah rap duo from the city of Vladikavkaz, North Ossetia, formed in 2013. The collective consists of Azamat Kudzaev (Miyagi) & Soslan Burnatsev (Эндшпиль or Andy Panda). The most popular singers (by amount of views on YouTube) from Russia. "I Got Love" track has collected more than 1 Billion hits on YouTube, the highest recorded Russian song.

== Biography ==
=== Эндшпиль (Andy Panda) ===
In March 2018, after a six-month break, the single "It's My Life" featuring TumaniYO was released. Soslan introduced himself with the new name Andy Panda, releasing the track "Intro". Only two singles were released in 2018: "Коконъ" & "Брат передал". Soslan released a music video for the second single on YouTube.

== History of the duo ==
=== 2018 ===
On 14 August 2018, the soundtrack "Hustle" was released for the documentary film "Charisma" along with a joint track with TumaniYO "Dance Up". A couple of months later, a joint track with Rem Digga, "Untouchable", was released.

=== 2019 ===
Since 2019, Soslan changed his nickname to Andy Panda, and the duo became known as "Miyagi & Andy Panda".

On 14 February 2020 the duo released a single called "Kosandra".

On 10 April 2020, the next song of their album Yamakasi was released titled «Мало нам».

On 21 May, Arnelle's treatment fundraising ended.

== Hajime Records ==
On 28 September 2018, TumaniYO released his debut album FOG#ONE, consisting of 12 songs.

== Discography ==
=== Albums of the duo ===
- 2013 — ЭNaMi (with Namo Minigan)
- 2016 — Hajime, pt. 1
- 2016 — Hajime, pt. 2
- 2017 — "Умшакалака" (with Amigo)
- 2018 — Hajime, pt. 3
- 2020 — Yamakasi
- 2022 — Hattori
- 2024 — Narrative
- 2024 — Euphoria (with Mav-d)
- 2026 — Anabios

== Videography ==
=== Music videos of the duo ===
Title		Director	Album
2022	"Патрон"	Igor Klepnev	Патрон
2022	"Silhouette"	Igor Klepnev	Hattori
2020	"Yamakasi"	Igor Tarasov	Yamakasi
2020	"Мало Нам" (Mood Video)	Georgiy Tarasov	Yamakasi
2020	"Minor" (Mood Video)	Georgiy Tarasov	Yamakasi
2020	"Там Ревели Горы" (Mood Video)	Georgiy Tarasov	Yamakasi
2020	"Brooklyn"	Igor Klepnev	Brooklyn
2020	"Samurai"	Yan Bokhanovich	Buster Keaton
2019	"Trenchtown"	Shakhnazar Borboev	Trenchtown
2019	"Rude Mantras"	Medet Shayakhmetov	King Kong
2019	"Freeman"	Azamat Kudzaev, Soslan Burnatsev	Freeman
2019	"Замёрз"	Adil Zhalelov	Замёрз
2018	"Брат передал"	Yan Bokhanovich (by Yanchi)	Брат передал
2017	"I Got Love"	Aisultan Seitov	Hajime, pt.2
2017	"Райзап"	Aleksei Lomov	Умшакалака
2016	"Двигайся"	Soslan Kabisov	Hajime, pt.2
2016	"Бошка"	N/A	Hajime, pt.2
2016	"Hajime"	N/A	Hajime, pt.1
2015	"Санавабич"	Pavel Enzhy	Hajime, pt.1

== Awards and nominations ==
Year	Award	Nomination	Nominee	Results	Ref.
2021	Berlin Music Video Awards	Best Cinematography	YAMAKASI	Nominated	
2022	VK Music	"Group of the year"	MiyaGi & Эндшпиль	Won	
2023	VK Music	"Group of the year"	MiyaGi & Эндшпиль	Won	
2024	VK Music	"Group of the year"	MiyaGi & Эндшпиль	Won	
2025	VK Music	"Group of the year"	MiyaGi & Эндшпиль	Won	
