= I Got Love (Miyagi song) =

2016 single by Miyagi & Endspiel feat. Rem Digga

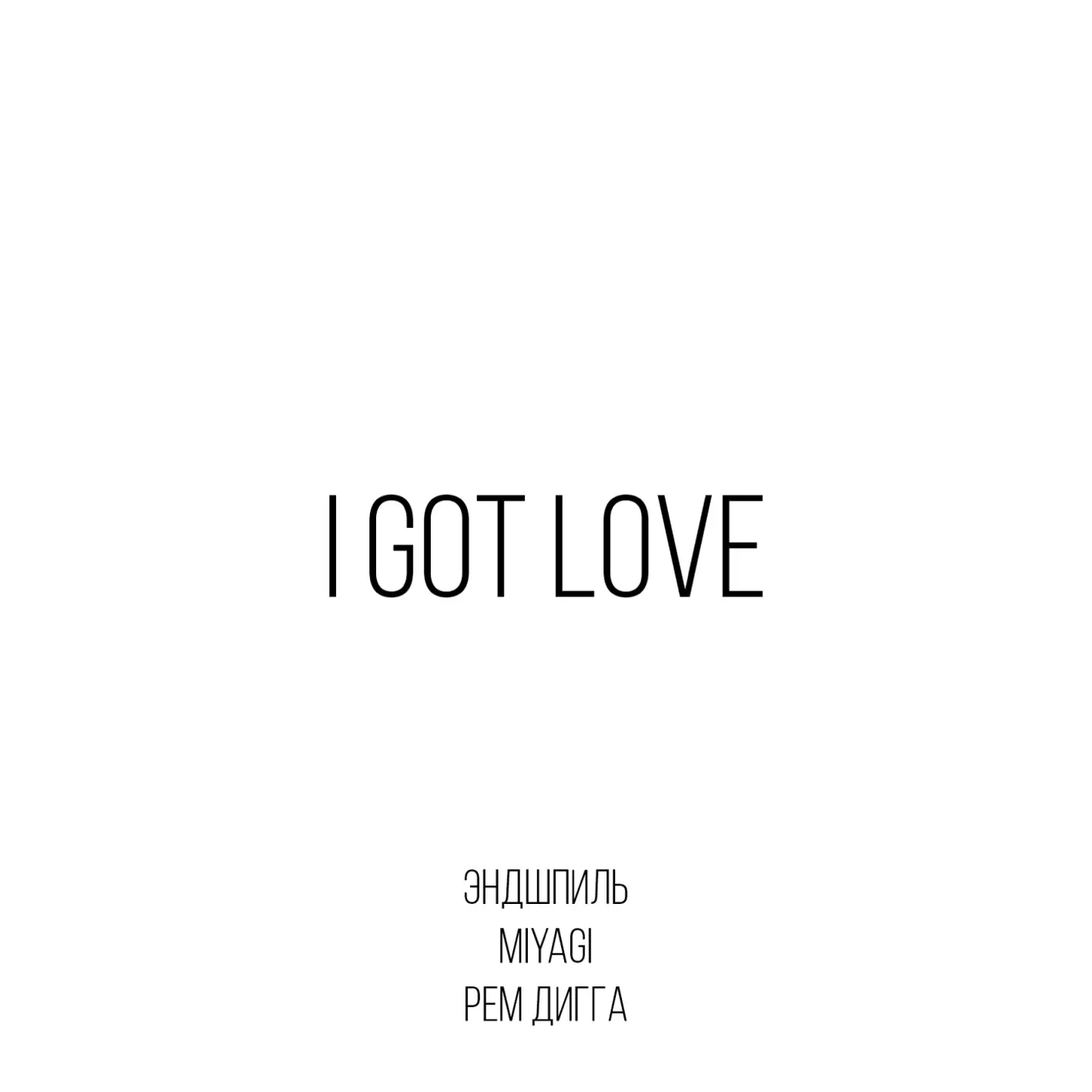

Single by Miyagi & Endspiel featuring Rem Digga
- Language: Russian, English
- Released: September 9, 2016
- Genre: Hookah rap
- Length: 4:34
- Label: Hajime Records
- Producer: Sad Soul

"I Got Love" is a song by Russian hookah rap duo Miyagi & Endspiel featuring Russian rapper Rem Digga, released on 9 September 2016 through the label Hajime Records. The video for the song became the most popular video on Russian YouTube, with over 1 billion views.

== Music video ==
In 2019 the music video set a record for a Russian song on YouTube, receiving 300 million views. In 2020, the song "Skibidi" by Russian rave group Little Big displaced the song "I Got Love" as the most popular clip on Russian YouTube, however in 2021, "I Got Love" reclaimed the record.

On December 27, 2024, the music video for the song surpassed 1 billion views on YouTube, becoming the first made-in-Russia and Russian-language music video on the website to reach such results. The very first overall made-in-Russia and Russian-language video on YouTube to reach billion views was the "Recipe for Disaster" episode of the animated series Masha and the Bear.

== Charts ==
=== Weekly charts ===
2017 weekly chart performance for "I Got Love"
Chart (2017)	Peak position
CIS Airplay (TopHit)	70
Latvia Streaming (LaIPA)	14
Russia Airplay (TopHit)	67

2018 weekly chart performance for "I Got Love"
Chart (2018)	Peak position
CIS Airplay (TopHit)	98
Estonia (Eesti Tipp-40)	12
Latvia Streaming (LaIPA)	8
Russia Airplay (TopHit)	80

2019 weekly chart performance for "I Got Love"
Chart (2019)	Peak position
Estonia (Eesti Tipp-40)	12
Slovakia Singles Digital (ČNS IFPI)	75

2022 weekly chart performance for "I Got Love"
Chart (2022)	Peak position
Russia (Billboard)	18

2025 weekly chart performance for "I Got Love"
Chart (2025)	Peak position
Latvia Streaming (LaIPA)	11
Lithuania (AGATA)	67
Russia Streaming (TopHit)	14

2026 weekly chart performance for "I Got Love"
Chart (2026)	Peak position
Greece International (IFPI)	66
Latvia Streaming (LaIPA)	6
Lithuania (AGATA)	14
Russia Streaming (TopHit)	14
Slovakia Singles Digital (ČNS IFPI)	40

=== Monthly charts ===
2017 monthly chart performance for "I Got Love"
Chart (2017)	Peak position
CIS Airplay (TopHit)	76
Russia Airplay (TopHit)	73

2025 monthly chart performance for "I Got Love"
Chart (2025)	Peak position
Russia Streaming (TopHit)	15

2026 monthly chart performance for "I Got Love"
Chart (2026)	Peak position
Russia Streaming (TopHit)	15

=== Year-end charts ===
2018 year-end chart performance for "I Got Love"
Chart (2018)	Peak position
CIS Airplay (TopHit)	169
Russia Airplay (TopHit)	148
Estonia (Eesti Tipp-40)	10

2019 year-end chart performance for "I Got Love"
Chart (2019)	Peak position
Latvia Streaming (LaIPA)	9

2025 year-end chart performance for "I Got Love"
Chart (2025)	Peak position
Russia Streaming (TopHit)	10

=== Decade-end charts ===
20s Decade-end chart performance
Chart (2025–2026)	Position
Russia Streaming (TopHit)	2

== Certifications ==
Certifications for "I Got Love"
Region	Certification	Certified units/sales
Greece (IFPI Greece)	Platinum	2,000,000^{†}
^{†} Streaming-only figures based on certification alone.
