= Yamakasi (album) =

Studio album by Miyagi & Andy Panda
- Released: 17 July 2020
- Recorded: 2019–2020
- Genres: Hip-hop; pop rap; reggaeton
- Length: 32:03
- Languages: English, Russian
- Label: Hajime Records

Yamakasi is the fifth studio album by the Vladikavkaz duo Miyagi & Andy Panda, released on 17 July 2020 through the label Hajime Records.

== History ==
The album took fifth place on the "Top-5 albums" on Spotify in Russia. The album was dedicated to the story of a two-year-old girl from Vladikavkaz, Arnella Persaeva, who was diagnosed with spinal muscular atrophy (SMA).

== List of compositions ==
All lyrics are written by Andy Panda & Miyagi

No.	Title	Music	Length
1.	"Atlant"	Mordbeats	3:07
2.	"Utopia"	Mordbeats	3:29
3.	"Мало нам"	Velocity	3:48
4.	"Психопатия"	Mordbeats	3:28
5.	"Tantra"	Ston Heng	4:16
6.	"Medicine"	MiyaGi	3:38
7.	"Minor"	Velocity	2:56
8.	"Там ревели горы"	Mordbeats	2:57
9.	"Yamakasi"	Velocity	4:24
Total length:			32:03
