= Sage (mini-album) =

2021 mini-album by Jah Khalib

EP by Jah Khalib
- Released: January 22, 2021
- Genres: Hip hop; rap
- Length: 20:54
- Language: Russian
- Label: Warner Music Russia

Sage (Russian: Мудрец) is the fourth mini-album by Kazakh rap singer Bakhtiyar Mamedov, better known as Jah Khalib. It was released on 22 January 2021 through the label Warner Music Russia and includes guest features from Maliki Fuentes and the rapper's wife, published under the pseudonym МаМедова. The album was inspired by Bakhtiyar's love story.

== Track listing ==
According to Tidal.
No.	Title	Length
1.	"Я не прощу" (with МаМедовой)	2:43
2.	"Талисман"	3:28
3.	"Моя любовь"	3:21
4.	"Во сне"	3:36
5.	"Воруй меня чаще" (with Маликой Фуэнтес)	3:39
6.	"Искал-нашёл"	4:07
Total length:		20:54
