= All or Nothing (Jamala album) =

Studio album by Jamala
- Released: 19 March 2013
- Recorded: 2012
- Genre: Pop; soul; jazz
- Length: 46:35
- Label: Moon Records Ukraine

Jamala chronology
For Every Heart (2011)	All or Nothing (2013)	Thank You (2014)

Singles from All or Nothing
- 1. "Я Люблю Тебя" Released: 8 November 2012; 2. "Hurt" Released: 18 December 2012; 3. "Кактус" Released: 6 March 2013

All or Nothing is the second studio album by Ukrainian recording artist Jamala. It was released on 19 March 2013 in Ukraine through Moon Records Ukraine. On April 26, 2013 the album was released on vinyl. The album includes the singles "Я Люблю Тебя", "Hurt" and "Кактус".

== Singles ==
"Я Люблю Тебя" was released as the lead single from the album on 8 November 2012. "Hurt" was released as the second single from the album on 18 December 2012. "Кактус" was released as the third single from the album on 6 March 2013.

== Track listing ==
Standard edition
No.	Title	Length
1.	"All Or Nothing"	3:52
2.	"How To Explain"	4:06
3.	"Кактус" (Cactus) (Russian)	3:57
4.	"What's Worse"	3:37
5.	"All These Simple Things"	3:35
6.	"Your Love"	4:17
7.	"У осени твои глаза" (Autumn Has Your Eyes) (Russian)	3:23
8.	"Я люблю тебя" (I Love You) (Russian)	2:45
9.	"Why Is That"	4:12
10.	"Like A Bird"	3:33
11.	"Hurt"	4:03
12.	"Unutmasan" (Crimean Tatar)	5:11
Total length:		46:35

== Release history ==
Country	Date	Label	Format
Ukraine	19 March 2013	Moon Records Ukraine	Digital download, CD
