= Thank You (Jamala EP) =

EP by Jamala
- Released: 1 October 2014
- Recorded: 2013
- Genre: Electro; sophisti-pop; soul
- Length: 26:52
- Label: Enjoy Records
- Producer: Igor Tarnopolskyy

Jamala chronology
All or Nothing (2013)	Thank You (2014)	Podykh (2015)

Singles from Thank You
- 1. "Заплуталась" Released: 25 September 2014

Thank You is the debut extended play by Ukrainian recording artist Jamala. It was released on 1 October 2014 in Ukraine through Moon Records Ukraine and includes the single "Заплуталась".

== Singles ==
"Заплуталась" was released as the lead and only single from the album on 25 September 2014.

== Track listing ==
Standard edition
No.	Title	Length
1.	"Заплуталась" (Confused) (Ukrainian)	5:10
2.	"My Lover"	3:38
3.	"Watch Over Me"	5:47
4.	"Perfect Man"	3:45
5.	"Песня о дружбе" (Song of Friendship) (Russian)	5:10
6.	"Thank You"	3:22
Total length:		26:52

== Release history ==
Country	Date	Label	Format
Ukraine	1 October 2014	Moon Records Ukraine	Digital download, CD
