= Kryla =

Studio album by Jamala
- Released: 12 October 2018
- Recorded: 2016 — 2018 (Kyiv, Ukraine)
- Studios: Recording Studio; Istok Studio
- Genres: Sophisti-pop; alternative
- Length: 37:40
- Label: Enjoy! Records
- Producers: Ihor Tarnopolskiy; Vitaliy Telezin

Jamala chronology
1944 (2016)	Kryla (2018)	Solo (2019)

Singles from Kryla
- 1. "I Believe in U" Released: 14 May 2017; 2. "Сумую" Released: 7 September 2017; 3. "Крила" Released: 21 March 2018

Kryla (Крила) (Wings) is the fourth studio album by Ukrainian recording artist Jamala. It was released on 12 October 2018 in Ukraine through Enjoy! Records. The album includes the singles "I Believe in U", "Сумую" and "Крила".

== Singles ==
"I Believe in U" was released as the lead single from the album on 14 May 2017. One day ago, Jamala performed this song during the voting interval of the final of the Eurovision Song Contest 2017, which took place at the International Exhibition Centre in Kyiv, Ukraine.

"Сумую" was released as the second single from the album on 7 September 2017.

"Крила" was released as the third single from the album on 21 March 2018. Jamala had previously performed the track as the interval act for the 2018 Ukrainian National Selection for the Eurovision Song Contest,

== Release and promotion ==
"Kryla" was released on October 12, 2018, for digital download and streaming through recording label Enjoy! Records. Its physical release was February 14, 2019 on LP.

The album was promoted with four music videos, directed by Ihor Stekolenko, Anna Kopilova and Anna Buryachkova, "I Believe in U", "Сумую", "Крила" and "The Great Pretender".

"I Believe in U" was presented on 12 May 2017 in Kyiv in Palace of Sports at the concert of the singer. It was released as a digital download on 14 May 2017 by Enjoy! Records. On 13 May 2017, Jamala performed the song during the voting interval of the final of the Eurovision Song Contest 2017, which took place at the International Exhibition Centre in Kyiv, Ukraine. The performance was disrupted by a man draped in an Australian flag who invaded the stage and briefly mooned the audience before being removed by security. The stage invader was later identified to be Ukrainian prankster Vitalii Sediuk.

The shooting of the clip for "I Believe in U" was held in April in Portugal. Directed by Igor Stekolenko, who directed over a hundred music videos for Ukrainian and foreign artists, including Okean Elzy and Brutto. The video shoot lasted three days and took place in Portuguese capital, Lisbon. The premiere of the video took place in 17 May. Lisbon hosted the next year's contest.

== Track listing ==
Standard edition
No.	Title	Lyrics	Music	Length
1.	"Крила"	Tatiana Milimko	Jamala	3:56
2.	"The Great Pretender"	Maria Q, Jamala	Jamala	3:29
3.	"Сумую"	Jamala	Jamala	4:10
4.	"Кохання"	Jamala, Viktoria Platova	Jamala	4:24
5.	"Незнайомець"	Jamala, Viktoria Platova	Jamala	3:53
6.	"Хвилі"	Jamala, Viktoria Platova	Jamala	3:40
7.	"Натовп"	Olena Teliha, Viktoria Platova, Jamala	Jamala, Alexander Kasprov	3:22
8.	"Любити" (acoustic version)	Jamala, Viktoria Platova	Jamala	4:34
9.	"Happiness"	Maria Q, Jamala	Jamala	2:51
10.	"I Believe in U"	Maria Q, Jamala	Jamala	3:21
Total length:				37:40

== Release history ==
Country	Date	Label	Format
Ukraine	12 October 2018	Enjoy! Records	Digital download
Ukraine	14 February 2019	Enjoy! Records	LP

=== Single ===
"I Believe in U"
Region	Date	Version	Format	Label
Various	14 May 2017	Original	Digital download	Enjoy!
Various	2 August 2017	Rmnk Remix	Digital download	Enjoy!
