= For Every Heart (Jamala album) =

Studio album by Jamala
- Released: 23 March 2011
- Recorded: 2010
- Studio: 211 Recording Studio (Kyiv)
- Genre: Pop; soul; jazz; funk
- Length: 56:30
- Language: English; Crimean Tatar; Russian; Ukrainian
- Label: Moon
- Producer: Yevhen Filatov

Jamala chronology
For Every Heart (2011)	All or Nothing (2013)

Singles from For Every Heart
- 1. "You Are Made of Love" Released: 14 February 2010; 2. "It's Me, Jamala" Released: 18 October 2010; 3. "Smile" Released: 23 November 2010

For Every Heart is the debut studio album by Ukrainian recording artist Jamala. It was released on 23 March 2011 in Ukraine through Moon Records Ukraine. The album includes the singles "You Are Made of Love", "It's Me, Jamala" and "Smile".

== Singles ==
"You Are Made of Love" was released as the lead single from the album on 14 February 2010. "It's Me, Jamala" was released as the second single from the album on 18 October 2010. "Smile" was released as the third single from the album on 23 November 2010.

== Track listing ==
Standard edition
No.	Title	Lyrics	Music	Length
1.	"For Every Heart"	Tetyana Skubashevska	Susana Dzhamaladinova	3:39
2.	"One More Try"	Tetyana Skubashevska	Susana Dzhamaladinova	4:19
3.	"You Are Made Of Love"	Tetyana Skubashevska	Susana Dzhamaladinova	3:58
4.	"It's Me, Jamala"	Tetyana Skubashevska	Susana Dzhamaladinova	3:19
5.	"Alas"	Tetyana Skubashevska	Susana Dzhamaladinova	4:41
6.	"In My Shoes"	Tetyana Skubashevska	Susana Dzhamaladinova	3:35
7.	"Without You"	Tetyana Skubashevska	Susana Dzhamaladinova	5:04
8.	"Sing It Out"	Tetyana Skubashevska	Susana Dzhamaladinova	3:46
9.	"Find Me"	Tetyana Skubashevska	Susana Dzhamaladinova	4:43
10.	"I See You Every Night"	Tetyana Skubashevska	Susana Dzhamaladinova	3:23
11.	"Pengereden"	Folk	Folk	2:57
12.	"Smile"	Tetyana Skubashevska	Susana Dzhamaladinova	3:12
13.	"History Repeating" (Bonus Track)	Alex Gifford	Alex Gifford	3:14
14.	"Маменькин сынок" (Bonus Track)	Dmytro Klimashenko	Dmytro Klimashenko	3:30
15.	"Верше, мій верше (Vershe Miy, Vershe)" (Bonus Track)	Folk	Folk	3:24
Total length:				56:30

== Release history ==
Country	Date	Label	Format
Ukraine	23 March 2011	Moon	Digital distribution, CD
