= Ropica Górna =

- Village
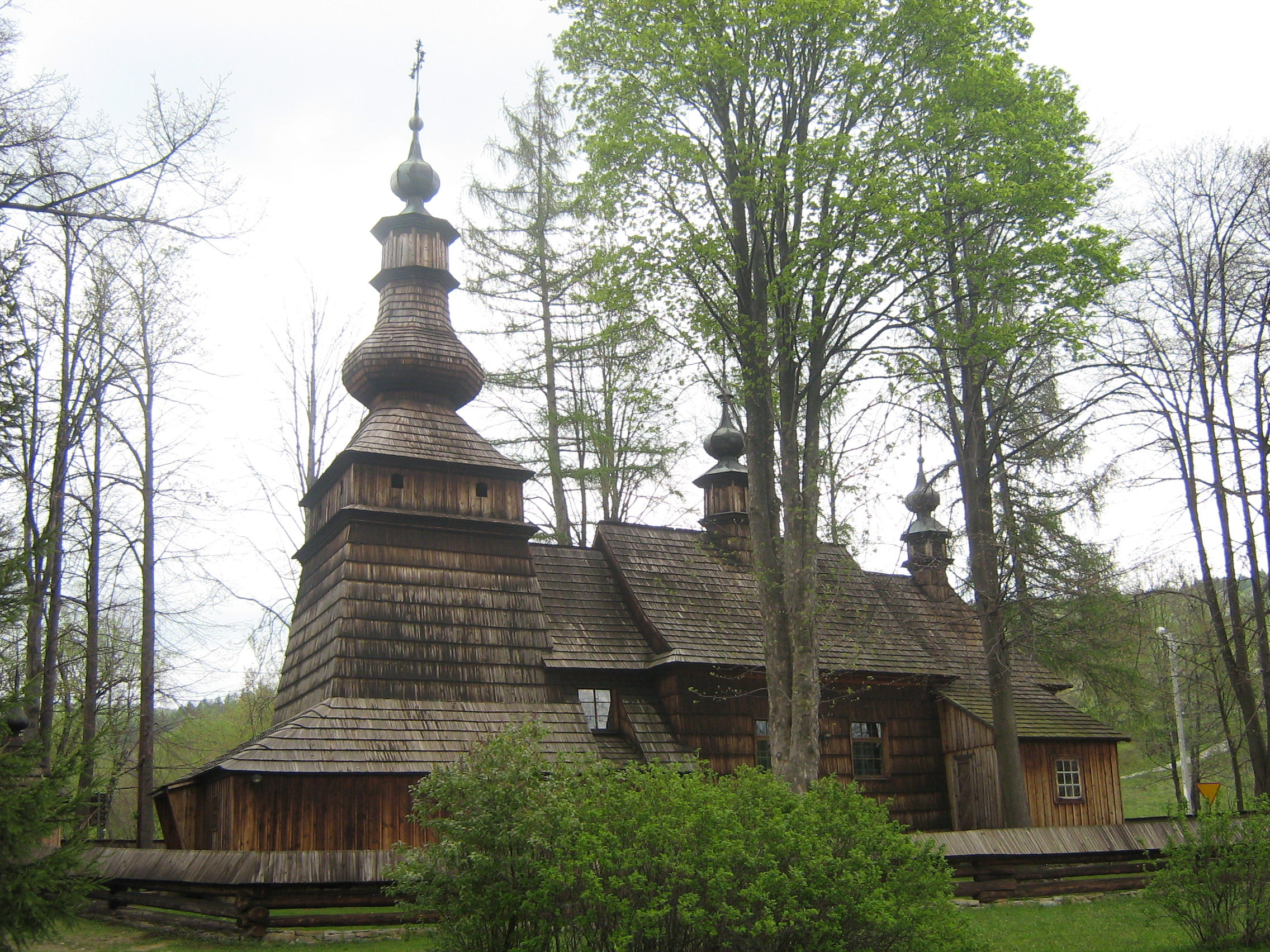
- Wooden Greek Catholic church

- Location within Poland
- Coordinates: 49°36′N 21°15′E
- Country: Poland
- Voivodeship: Lesser Poland
- County: Gorlice
- Gmina: Sękowa
- Population: 530

Ropica Górna [rɔˈpʲit͡sa ˈɡurna] is a village in the administrative district of Gmina Sękowa, within Gorlice County, Lesser Poland Voivodeship, in southern Poland, close to the border with Slovakia.

During World War I heavy fighting took place in the area as part of the important Gorlice-Tarnów Offensive.
