= Podykh =

Studio album by Jamala
- Released: 12 October 2015
- Recorded: 2014
- Genre: Electro; jazz; sophisti-pop; alternative
- Length: 52:21
- Label: Enjoy Records

Jamala chronology
Thank You (2014)	Podykh (2015)	1944 (2016)

Singles from Podykh
- 1. "Очима" Released: 26 March 2015; 2. "Шлях додому" Released: 18 May 2015; 3. "Подих" Released: 15 June 2015

Podykh (Подих) (Breath) is the third studio album by Ukrainian recording artist Jamala. It was released on 12 October 2015 in Ukraine through Enjoy Records. The album includes the singles "Очима", "Шлях додому" and "Подих".

== Singles ==
"Очима" was released as the lead single from the album on 26 March 2015. "Шлях додому" was released as the second single from the album on 18 May 2015. "Подих" was released as the third single from the album on 15 June 2015.

== Track listing ==
Standard edition
No.	Title	Length
1.	"Подих"	4:29
2.	"Чому саме тебе"	3:22
3.	"Шлях додому"	4:26
4.	"Більше" (with Morphom)	3:49
5.	"Иные"	3:25
6.	"Ночь"	3:47
7.	"Очима"	4:33
8.	"Drifting Apart" (with The Erised)	3:31
9.	"Hate Love"	3:46
10.	"Неандертальці"	3:25
11.	"Обещание"	3:43
12.	"Sister's Lullaby"	4:58
13.	"Заплуталась" (Bonus track)	5:07
Total length:		52:21

== Release history ==
Country	Date	Label	Format
Ukraine	12 October 2015	Enjoy Records	Digital download, CD
