= Hookah rap =

Subgenre of rap

- Native name: Кальянный рэп, кальян-рэп, шиша-рэп
- Other names: Hookah pop
- Stylistic origins: Russian rap; Russian pop; Trap music; Deep house; Tech house; Reggaeton; Meykhana
- Cultural origins: Mid 2010s, Russia; Azerbaijan; Armenia; Kazakhstan; Ukraine
- Typical instruments: Autotune; Vocals; Digital audio workstation

Hookah rap, or hookah pop (Russian: кальян-рэп, romanized: kal'yan-rep, IPA: [kalʲ'jan rɛp], Russian: кальянный рэп, romanized: kal'yannyy rep, IPA: [kɐlʲ'jannɨj rɛp], Russian: шиша-рэп, romanized: shisha-rep, IPA: [ʂɨ'ʂa-rɛp]), is a genre of Russian rap or Russian pop which originated in Russia during the mid 2010s and popularized across the post-Soviet countries in the late 2010s.

== Style and history ==
The genre has no clear defined principles, although it is closely connected to music and modern aesthetics of the Caucasus, sometimes taking the use of the melodies of Arabic music, music of the Middle East, music of Central Asia, and intersecting with the production style of various trending in mid-to-late 2010s genres, such as hip hop music, trap music and house music, as well as being inspired by and crossing over into other mainstream genres like estrada.

The album Chernika (transl. Blueberry) released by Russian rapper Rem Digga in 2012 is called to be a precursor of hookah rap.

The first tracks in the genre date back to 2014 from the artist Jah Khalib, who has been called a pioneer of the genre. These tracks were characterised by hedonistic Drake-like lyrics and with a distinctive melodic immersive production style. A few years later, the artist released major hits in the genre such as "Leyla", "Medina", "Sozvezdiye angela" and others.

In 2016, when house rap was at the peak of popularity with a special form of production that mimicked deep baselines of deep house, rap duo MiyaGi & Andy Panda (then known as MiyaGi & Endshpil) tried to combine this trend with hookah rap in their track "Tamada", which became one of the first major hits in the genre. Later on, this style of production increasingly overlapped with the genre.

The rap duo HammAli & Navai released their biggest hookah rap hit "Khochesh, ya k tebe priyedu" (transl. If you want, I will come to you) in 2017. Later in 2018, they were named as those who cultivated the style. The first use of the term "hookah rap" is also traced to them in 2018. But the term itself was popularized by Bahh Tee, the head of the Atlantic Records Russia (then known as Zhara Music). According to the journalist of the Kommersant newspaper Boris Barabanov, this style was one of the most popular styles in Russia in 2019.

== Reception ==
Editor of the Russian music media TheFlow.ru Nikolay Redkin described hookah rap as:

"Hookah rap is music in which there are a lot of one-hit wonders. This is the music of artists who appear out of nowhere and also disappear into nowhere. This music does not work in the album format."

— Nikolai Redkin, "Hookah Rap": A genre that everyone hates and listens to anyway (Nikolai Redkin, ИМИ)

In 2020, Bahh Tee has argued that hookah rap eventually homogenized into mainstream music, and now is undetectable as anything stylistically different.

== Characteristics ==
Hookah rap is characterized by the following features, although the style is not cemented in any one aesthetic direction:

- Hookah rap is performed in Russian language.
- The performers are characterized by the usage of a Caucasian, Central Asian or, in general, any oriental accent, or its intentional imitation.
- The vocals in hookah rap are performed with the indistinct intonation and a lot of pitch correction (autotune).
- Hookah rap melodic lines are reminiscent of Arabic music.
- Rhythmically, hookah rap either uses hip hop beats, or trap beats, or reggaeton dembow. However, many tracks employ straight 4-to-the-floor kick drum pattern, an influence of house music.
- Rapping in hookah rap sounds, as a rule, softer, which is the influence from meykhana.
- Also in a number of tracks, the presence of clean vocals in a style similar to soul is noted .
- The theme of the songs is not similar to traditional hip-hop and is uncharacteristic of it. As a rule, these are themes typical for pop music in general: unrequited love, dreams of happiness. Some tracks glamourize the neon aesthetic and nightlife and clubbing. In general, the topics of the texts are quite diverse.

== See also ==
- Russian hip hop
- Meykhana

== Links ==
- "Hookah Rap": A genre that everyone hates and listens to anyway (Nikolai Redkin, ИМИ)
- We are hookah rap, we even have hookahs (Meduza, 2020)
