= 1944 (album) =

Compilation album by Jamala
- Released: 10 June 2016 in Europe; 10 July 2016 in US
- Genre: Electro; sophisti-pop; funk
- Length: 48:24
- Language: English; Crimean Tatar (in one track); Ukrainian (in three track)
- Label: Universal Denmark in Europe; Republic in USA

Jamala chronology
Подих (2015)	1944 (2016)	Крила (2018)

Singles from 1944
- 1. "1944" Released: 5 February 2016

1944 is a compilation album by Ukrainian recording artist Jamala. It was released on 10 June 2016 in Europe through Universal Music Denmark and on 10 July 2016 in United States through Republic Records. The album includes the single "1944".

== Singles ==
"1944" was released as the lead single from the album on 5 February 2016. Jamala was announced as one of the eighteen competing acts in the Ukrainian national selection for the Eurovision Song Contest. She performed in the first semi-final on 6 February 2016, where she won both the jury and televote, advancing to the Ukrainian final. In the final, on 21 February, she was placed second by the jury and first by the televote, resulting in a tie with The Hardkiss and their song "Helpless". Jamala was announced as the winner, however, as the televoting acted as a tiebreaker. She received 37.77% of more than 382,000 televotes. She represented Ukraine in the Eurovision Song Contest 2016, performing in the second half of the second semi-final. The song is the first Eurovision song to contain lyrics in the Crimean Tatar language. She won the final receiving the second highest televoting score and second highest jury vote.

== Track listing ==
Standard edition
No.	Title	Lyrics	Music	Length
1.	"1944"	Art Antonyan; Jamala	Jamala	3:00
2.	"I'm Like a Bird"	Jamala; Olena Chubuklieva	Jamala	3:33
3.	"Hate Love"	Jamala	Jamala	3:46
4.	"Watch Over Me"	Maria Quintile	Jamala	5:47
5.	"Perfect Man"	Art Antonyan	Jamala	3:45
6.	"My Lover"	Art Antonyan; Jamala	Jamala	3:38
7.	"Drifting Apart" (with The Erised)	Jamala	The Erised	3:31
8.	"You've Got Me"	Art Anonyan	Jamala	3:24
9.	"Thank You"	Art Antonyan	Jamala	3:22
10.	"With My Eyes"	Jamala; Victoria Platova	Jamala	4:33
11.	"Way To Home"	Jamala; Platova	Jamala	4:26
12.	"Breath"	Jamala; Platova	Jamala	4:29
Total length:				48:24

== Release history ==
Country	Date	Label	Format
Europe	10 June 2016	Universal Denmark	Digital download; CD
United States	10 July 2016	Republic	Digital download; CD
