= Jah Khalib =

Kazakh-Azerbaijani rapper (born 1993)

- Born: Bakhtiyar Mammadov; September 29, 1993 (age 32); Almaty, Kazakhstan
- Origin: Azerbaijani, Kazakh
- Genres: Hip hop; Alternative hip-hop; Pop rap; Hookah rap
- Occupations: Rapper; singer; songwriter; record producer
- Labels: Warner Music Russia
- Website: jahkhalib.com

Bakhtiyar Mammadov (Azerbaijani: Bəxtiyar Məmmədov, Kazakh: Бахтияр Мамедов; born 29 September 1993), known professionally as Jah Khalib is a Kazakh-Azerbaijani rapper, singer and record producer.

== Biography ==
Bakhtiyar Mammadov was born on September 29, 1993, in Almaty to an Azerbaijani father and Kazakh mother. He studied musicology and management in the Kazakh National Conservatory.

When starting his solo career, he took on the stage name of Jah Khalib. According to him, Khalib is a fictitious name, while Jah is the name of God in Rastafari. Among his early works, the most popular were "Твои сонные глаза", "SnD", "Сжигая дотла" and "Ты для меня". Soon after, his popularity grew outside Kazakhstan. He released his first solo album in 2016, named "Если че, я Баха".

In 2015 and 2016 he was included in the list of stars of show business and sports of the Forbes Kazakhstan magazine. In June 2017, he won the Muz-TV 2017 Prize for the "Breakthrough of the Year" nomination. In 2018, he received his first Golden Gramophone Award for the song "Медина" in Moscow.

In the summer of 2019, he moved to Kyiv, where he continued to work on his album "Выход в свет". He released the album on 29 October 2019, which contained 14 tracks.

In April 2023, his concerts in Moscow and St. Petersburg were cancelled due to his open support of Ukraine.

== Personal life ==
He got married in the summer of 2020. In 2022 he revealed that his wife is Ukrainian, who converted to Islam.

== Discography ==
=== Studio albums ===
- KHALIBания души - released in 2015
- Джазовый грув - released in 2016
- Всё что мы любим - released in 2016
- Если чё, я Баха - released in 2016
- E.G.O. - released in 2018
- Выход в свет - released in 2019
- 911 - released in 2020
- Баха и Дмитрий Карантино - released in 2020
- Мудрец - released in 2021
