= Nash Format =

Ukrainian publishing company

- Company type: Publishing
- Industry: Ukrainian culture
- Founded: September 2006
- Headquarters: Kyiv, Ukraine
- Products: Books, audiobooks, ebooks
- Website: http://www.nashformat.ua

Nash Format Publishers is a Ukrainian publishing company based in Kyiv. It focused on non-fiction literature and has a fiction series. The publisher has offered to the Ukrainian readers 300 translations of books, including works by Nobel Prize laureates, The New York Times and The Economist bestsellers. Nash Format publishes both printed books, ebooks and records audiobooks.

== History ==
Nash Format was established in 2006 by Ukrainian businessmen and philanthropist Vladyslav Kyrychenko. At first, the company operated as an art-agency focused on producing Ukrainian bands, holding festivals, production of merchandise and publishing books. Later Nash Format was transformed into the publishing house.

In 2012, Anton Martynov joined the company as a CEO and in 2013 became a co-owner.

Nash Format Publishers has published around 1,5 million books, recorded over 200 audiobooks, launched its bookshop and online store, created an app for reading e-books and listening to audiobooks.

The company has set up an extensive distribution network. The network includes more than 800 sales points, both online and offline.

In 2014, the publishing house began to specialize in Ukrainian translations of non-fiction, including global bestsellers on business, self-development, economics, psychology, and success stories.

In 2020, a children's department headed by writer Ivan Andrusiak was created, and during the year, 19 books were published for readers aged 3 (Fairy Tales series) to 12+ (Adventures, Fantasy, and Feelings series). There are also publications for family reading (the Family series). Some of the published children's books are included in the school curriculum of the Ministry of Education and Science of Ukraine.

At the end of May 2020, the editor-in-chief and several top managers left the company due to a conflict with the owner. The pretext was the publication of a book about the coronavirus by a Russian scientist, and the real reason was called bad attitude and "humiliation at work." Vladyslav Kyrychenko himself said that since 2018, the direction in which the company's team had been moving did not correspond to his vision.

Over the years, the publishing house has published more than 500 titles with a total circulation of more than 2 million 200 thousand copies.

As of 2022, Nash Format's books are available in bookstores in Poland, Italy, Lithuania, Switzerland, Germany, the United States, and more.

== Bestsellers ==
In 2015 Nash Format was the 7th among the 20 best publishing brands according to Forbes Ukraine.

Nash Format Publishers has made and offered to the Ukrainian readers 300 translations of books: from business and economics to psychology and self-development, biographies and memoirs. Among them such bestsellers as:

- My Life And Work by Henry Ford
- Why Nations Fail: The Origins of Power, Prosperity, and Poverty by Daron Acemoglu, James A. Robinson
- Atlas Shrugged by Ayn Rand
- Civilization: The West and the Rest by Niall Ferguson
- The Subtle Art Of Not Giving A F*ck by Mark Manson
- A Mind for Numbers: How to Excel at Math and Science (Even If You Flunked Algebra) by Barbara Oakley
- Good to Great: Why Some Companies Make the Leap... and Others Don't by James C. Collins
- The Black Swan: The Impact of the Highly Improbable by Nassim Nicholas Taleb
- Freakonomics: A Rogue Economist Explores the Hidden Side of Everything (Freakonomics, #1) by Steven D. Levitt, Stephen J. Dubner

Nash Format also translated and presented a series of books about great businesses (Nike, Amazon, IKEA, Starbucks, etc). The company presented to Ukrainian readers novels of Celeste Ng and Kate Atkinson.

== Awards ==
In 2015, Nash Format was the 7th among the 20 best publishing brands according to Forbes Ukraine.

== Audiobooks ==
Nash Format Publishers has its recording studio and produces audiobooks. It records classical literature and modern non-fiction. The audiobooks are recorded by famous narrators – radio hosts, actors, etc.

== Bookstore ==
Nash Format Publishers has a book store and online store nashformat.ua that offers worldwide delivery.

== Club ==
Nash Format created its educational platform in Kyiv. It hosts discussions, public talks, book presentations, etc.

== Mobile App ==
In 2019 Nash Format Publishers launched an application for reading books and listening to audiobooks online and offline. All files are secured. After the purchase users can read and listen to audiobooks online and offline, but it is impossible to download files on the device. It helps to protect files from illegal sharing.
