= Jamala =

Ukrainian singer (born 1983)

Jamala Джамала Shevchenko National Prize laureate
- Jamala during the Dancing with the Stars in 2022

Background information
- Born: Susana Alimivna Jamaladinova (Susana Alim qızı Camaladinova); 27 August 1983 (age 43); Osh, Kirghiz SSR, Soviet Union (present day Kyrgyzstan)
- Origin: Crimea
- Genres: Soul; Jazz; Pop; R&B; EDM; Folk; World; Funk; Gospel
- Occupation: Singer
- Years active: 2001–present
- Labels: Moon; Enjoy!; Universal
- Website: jamala.ua

Susana Alimivna Jamaladinova (Note: Crimean Tatar: Susana Alim qızı Camaladinova; Ukrainian: Суса́на Алі́мівна Джамаладі́нова, romanized: Susána Alímivna Dzhamaladínova, IPA: [sʊˈsɑnɐ ɐˈl⁽ʲ⁾imiu̯nɐ dʒɐmɐlɐˈd⁽ʲ⁾inowɐ]; Russian: Суса́на Али́мовна Джамалади́нова, romanized: Susána Alímovna Dzhamaladínova, IPA: [sʊˈsanə ɐˈlʲiməvnə dʐəməlɐˈdʲinəvə].) (born 27 August 1983), known professionally as Jamala, (Note: Crimean Tatar: Camala, also spelt Джамала in Cyrillic; Ukrainian: Джама́ла, IPA: [dʒɐˈmɑlɐ]; Russian: Джама́ла, IPA: [dʐɐˈmalə].) is a Ukrainian singer. She represented Ukraine and won the Eurovision Song Contest 2016 with her song "1944". From 2017 to 2025, she has served as a judge at Vidbir, the Ukrainian national selection for the Eurovision Song Contest. In November 2023, Russia added Jamala to its wanted list.

== Early life ==
Susana Dzhamaladinova was born in Osh, Kirghiz SSR, to a Muslim Crimean Tatar father and an Armenian mother. Her Crimean Tatar ancestors were forcibly resettled from Crimea to the central Asian republic under Joseph Stalin during World War II, although her own relatives fought on the Soviet side. In 1989 her family returned to Crimea. Her maternal ancestors are Armenians from Nagorno-Karabakh region. They were well-to-do peasants until her great-grandfather's land was confiscated and he was exiled to Osh where he changed his Armenian name to make it sound more Russian.

She grew up in a family of musicians — her mother worked as a teacher at a music school, and her father was a conductor by education.

Her parents divorced for about four years so that her mother could purchase a house in Crimea for the family under her maiden name. During this period, Soviet authorities did not allow ethnic Crimean Tatars, like her father, to purchase property in Crimea.

== Career ==
=== 2010–2015: Early work ===
Jamala has been fond of music since her early childhood. She made her first professional recording at the age of nine, singing 12 folk and children's Crimean Tatar songs. She entered the Simferopol Music College and later graduated from Tchaikovsky National Music Academy of Ukraine as an opera singer, but preferred a career in pop music.

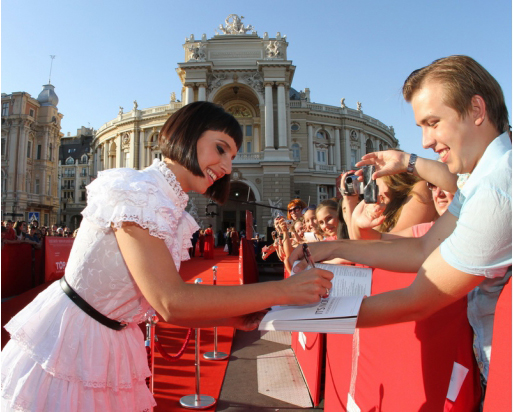
Jamala signing an autograph for a fan on the red carpet of the third annual festival of the Odesa Film Festival on 13 July 2012.

On 14 February 2010, she released her first single "You Are Made of Love" from her debut studio album For Every Heart. She released "It's Me, Jamala" as the second single on 18 October 2010. On 23 November 2010, she released "Smile" as the third single from the album. Early in 2011, she participated on the national selection show in an attempt to represent Ukraine at the Eurovision Song Contest with the song "Smile". The song was a crowd favorite and Jamala herself managed to land a spot in the finals of the competition. However, she later decided to withdraw from the competition. On 12 April 2011, she released her debut studio album For Every Heart through Moon Records Ukraine. On 8 November 2012, she released "Ya Lyublyu Tebya" (Russian: «Я Люблю́ Тебя́», English: "I Love You") as the lead single from her second studio album All or Nothing.

She released "Hurt" as the second single, and "Kaktus" (Ukrainian: «Ка́ктус», English: "Cactus") was released on 6 March 2013, as the third and final single from the album. She released All or Nothing on 19 March 2013, through Moon Records Ukraine. On 25 September 2014, she released "Zaplutalas" (Ukrainian: «Заплу́талась», English: "Confused") as the lead single from her debut EP Thank You. The EP was released on 1 October 2014, through Enjoy Records. On 26 March 2015, "Ochyma" was released as the lead single from her third studio album. "Shlyakh dodomu" (Ukrainian: «Шлях додо́му», English: "The way home") was released as the second single on 18 May 2015. On 15 June 2015, "Podykh" (Ukrainian: «По́дих», English: "Breath") was released as the third single. She released her album Podykh on 12 October 2015, through Enjoy Records.

=== 2016–present: Eurovision Song Contest and subsequent projects ===
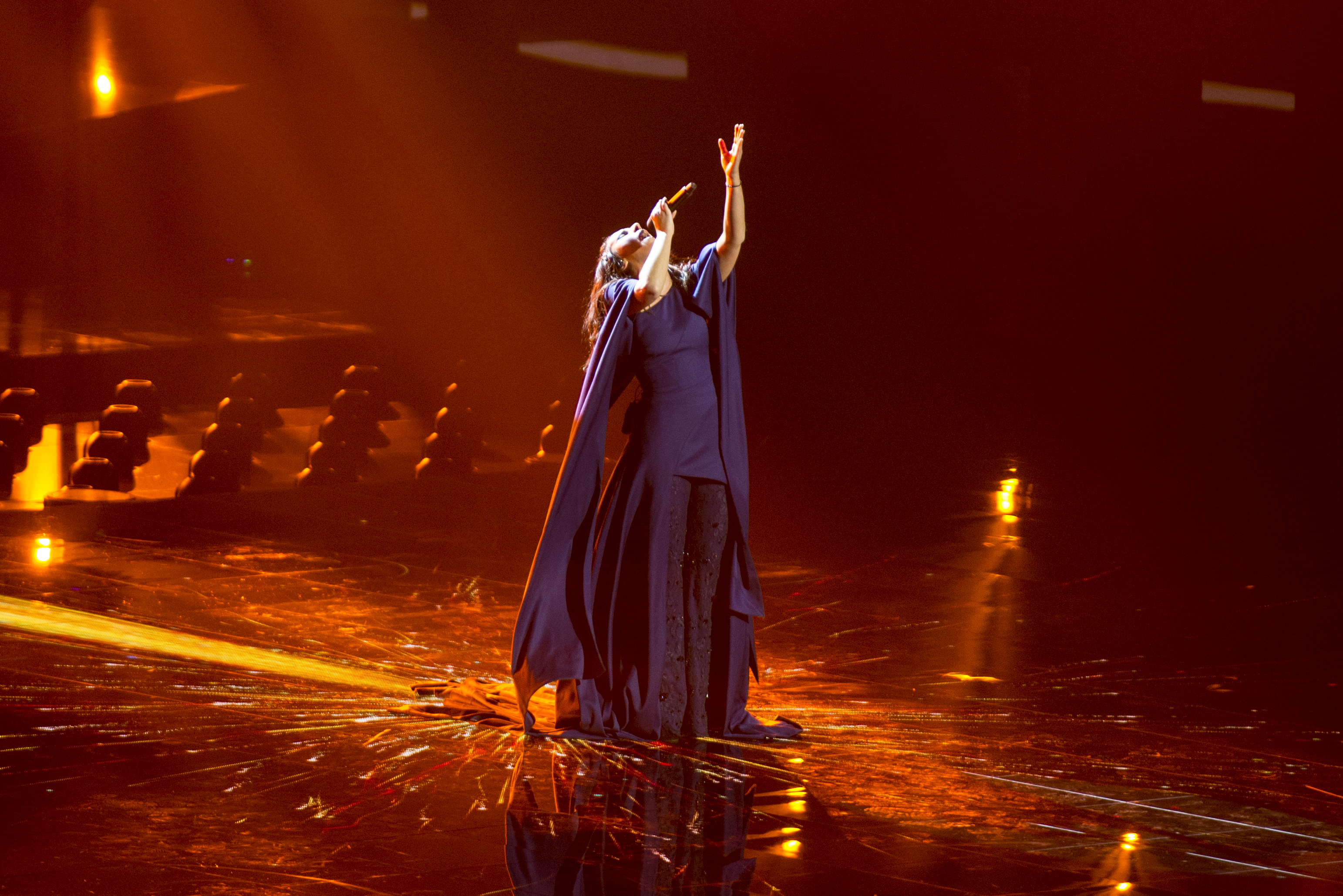
Jamala performing at the Eurovision Song Contest 2016.

Jamala successfully represented Ukraine in the Eurovision Song Contest 2016 with the song "1944". The song is about the deportation of the Crimean Tatars in 1944 and particularly about her great-grandmother, who lost her daughter while being deported to Central Asia. Jamala wrote the song's lyrics in 2014. In the second semi-final of the contest, Jamala performed 14th and was one of ten participants who qualified for the grand final. It was announced later that she placed second, scoring 287 points, and won the televoting with 152 points On 14 May 2016, Jamala won the competition with 534 points. Jamala's song was considered by Russian media and lawmakers to be critical of the Russian annexation of Crimea in 2014 and the "ongoing war between Russia and Ukraine" in Donbas.

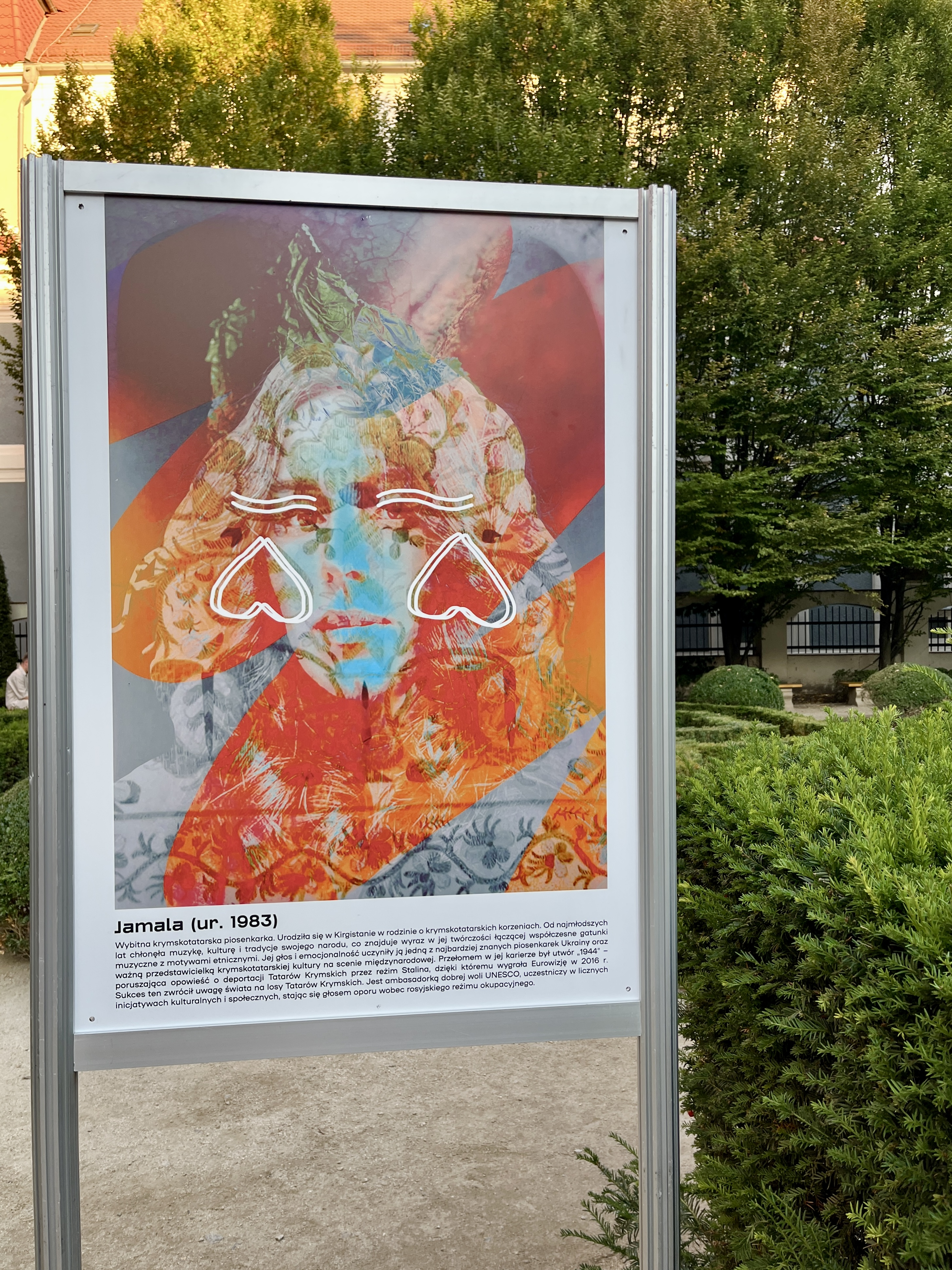
The stand dedicated to Jamala at the exhibition «She is Crimea, She is World» by the Krymski Dom Foundation in Wrocław (Poland), October 2025

After her Eurovision Song Contest victory, she was awarded the title People's Artist of Ukraine by then-Ukrainian president Petro Poroshenko. She has then continued to release new music, including "I Believe in U", which she performed at the Eurovision Song Contest 2017 as an interval act, along with "Zamanyly".

On 17 May 2016, Poroshenko announced that the Ukrainian Foreign Ministry would be nominating Jamala as a UNICEF Goodwill Ambassador.

On 12 October 2018, Jamala released her fifth studio album, Kryla. The title track was released as the first single on 21 March 2018. She had previously performed the track as the interval act for the 2018 Ukrainian national selection for the Eurovision Song Contest, Vidbir.

In 2022, she appeared in season 26 of the Polish TV show Taniec z Gwiazdami (Dancing with the Stars).

Jamala performed "1944" during the flag parade in the final of the Eurovision Song Contest 2023, alongside fellow past Ukrainian entrants Go_A, Tina Karol, and Verka Serduchka. One year later, she was the Ukrainian spokesperson at the Eurovision Song Contest 2024.

== Personal life ==
On 26 April 2017, Jamala married Bekir Suleimanov. Their relationship became known in September 2016, when she appeared with him at the Manhattan Short Film Festival. The couple married in the Kyiv Islamic Cultural Center using the traditional wedding ceremony Nikah. Suleimanov had recently graduated from the Physics and Mathematics Department of Taras Shevchenko National University of Kyiv and is an activist of the Muslim Crimean Tatar community.

In November 2017, Jamala announced that she and Suleimanov were expecting their first child together. They have had three children together, all sons – born in 2018, 2020, and 2024.

Jamala is fluent in Ukrainian, Crimean Tatar, Russian and English.

In February 2022, amidst the Russian invasion of Ukraine, she and her two children left Ukraine and initially took refuge in Romania, before eventually landing in Turkey.

After February 24, 2022, the celebrity participated in the GIDNA project from Future for Ukraine Charity Foundation. While reading the votes at the Eurovision Song Contest 2024, she announced that she was expecting her third child.

== Discography ==
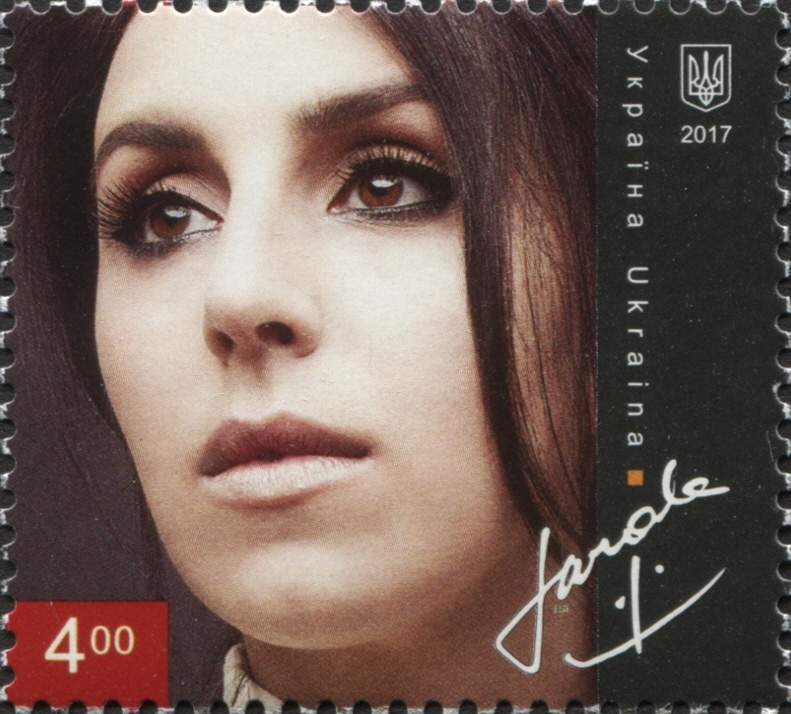
Jamala on a 2017 stamp of Ukraine

=== Studio albums ===
Title	Details
For Every Heart	Released: 23 March 2011; Label: Moon Records Ukraine; Format: Digital download, CD
All or Nothing	Released: 19 March 2013; Label: Moon Records Ukraine; Format: Digital download, CD, vinyl
Подих (Podykh)	Released: 12 October 2015; Label: Enjoy! Records; Format: Digital download, CD, vinyl
Крила (Kryla)	Released: 12 October 2018; Label: Enjoy! Records; Format: Digital download, CD, vinyl
Ми (My)	Released: 12 March 2021; Label: Enjoy! Records; Format: Digital download
Qırım (Crimea)	Released: May 4, 2023; Label: Universal Music Polska; Format: Digital download, CD, vinyl

=== Live albums ===
Title	Details
For every heart. Live at Arena Concert Plaza	Released: 20 April 2012; Label: Moon Records Ukraine; Format: CD + DVD

=== Compilation albums ===
Title	Details
1944	Released: 10 June 2016; Label: Universal Music Denmark; Format: Digital download, CD
10	Released: 6 September 2019; Label: Enjoy! Records; Format: Digital download, Vinyl
Свої (Svoi)	Released: 21 February 2020; Label: Enjoy! Records; Format: Digital download

=== Remix albums ===
Title	Details
Solo	Released: 15 February 2019; Label: 2220 Records, Enjoy! Records; Format: Digital download

=== Extended plays ===
Title	Details
Thank You	Released: 1 October 2014; Label: Enjoy! Records; Format: Digital download, CD
1944	Released: 10 May 2016; Label: Enjoy! Records; Format: Digital download, CD
5:45	Released: 23 April 2021; Label: Enjoy! Records; Format: Digital download

=== Singles ===
Title	Year	Peak chart positions											Album
Title	Year	UKR	AUT	BEL (Fl)	FIN	FRA	HUN	POL	SPA	SWE	SWI	UK	Album
"You're Made of Love"	2010	—	—	—	—	—	—	—	—	—	—	—	For Every Heart
"It's me, Jamala"	2010	—	—	—	—	—	—	—	—	—	—	—	For Every Heart
"Smile"	2010	71	—	—	—	—	—	—	—	—	—	—	For Every Heart
"Я люблю тебя" ("I love you")	2012	—	—	—	—	—	—	—	—	—	—	—	All or Nothing
"Hurt"	2012	—	—	—	—	—	—	—	—	—	—	—	All or Nothing
"Кактус" ("Cactus")	2013	—	—	—	—	—	—	—	—	—	—	—	All or Nothing
"Заплуталась" ("Confused")	2014	—	—	—	—	—	—	—	—	—	—	—	Thank you
"Злива" ("Shower") (with Andrii Khlyvniuk)	2014	—	—	—	—	—	—	—	—	—	—	—	10
"Чому?" ("Why?")	2014	—	—	—	—	—	—	—	—	—	—	—	Non-album singles
"Очима" ("With my eyes")	2015	—	—	—	—	—	—	—	—	—	—	—	Podykh
"Шлях додому" ("Way to home")	2015	93	—	—	—	—	—	—	—	—	—	—	Podykh
"Подих" ("Breath")	2015	—	—	—	—	—	—	—	—	—	—	—	Podykh
"1944"	2016	7	54	63	64	49	40	25	32	46	73	289	1944
"Заманили" ("Lured") (with DakhaBrakha)	2016	44	—	—	—	—	—	—	—	—	—	—	10
"I Believe in U"	2017	19	—	—	—	—	—	—	—	—	—	—	Kryla
"Сумую" ("I miss")	2017	82	—	—	—	—	—	—	—	—	—	—	Kryla
"Крила" ("Wings")	2018	54	—	—	—	—	—	—	—	—	—	—	Kryla
"Самға"	2018	—	—	—	—	—	—	—	—	—	—	—	Non-album single
"Solo"	2019	89	—	—	—	—	—	—	—	—	—	—	10
"Крок" ("Step") (with Cape Cod)	2019	—	—	—	—	—	—	—	—	—	—	—	Svoi
"Кохаю" ("I love") (with Jah Khalib)	2019	61	—	—	—	—	—	—	—	—	—	—	Svoi
"Ціна правди" ("The price of truth")	2019	—	—	—	—	—	—	—	—	—	—	—	Non-album single
"Забирай" (with alyona alyona)	2019	—	—	—	—	—	—	—	—	—	—	—	Svoi
"Жалі" (with alyona alyona)	2020	27	—	—	—	—	—	—	—	—	—	—	Svoi
"Эндорфины" ("Endorphins") (with Pianoboy)	2020	—	—	—	—	—	—	—	—	—	—	—	Non-album single
"Вдячна" ("Grateful")	2021	12	—	—	—	—	—	—	—	—	—	—	My
"Моя земля" ("My land") (with Tayanna)	2021	71	—	—	—	—	—	—	—	—	—	—	Non-album singles
“Потайки” ("Secretly")	2021	—	—	—	—	—	—	—	—	—	—	—	Non-album singles
“Новий рік з тобою“ ("New Year with you")	2021	—	—	—	—	—	—	—	—	—	—	—	Non-album singles
“Хай буде так, як хочеш ти” ("Let it be as you wish")	2022	—	—	—	—	—	—	—	—	—	—	—	OST “Rocky Road to Berlin“
“Thank you, Stranger“	2022	—	—	—	—	—	—	—	—	—	—	—	Non-album singles
“Коли закінчаться війни“ ("When the wars will end")	2022	—	—	—	—	—	—	—	—	—	—	—	Non-album singles
“The Great Pretender”	2023	—	—	—	—	—	—	—	—	—	—	—	Spotify Singles
“Frozen“	2023	—	—	—	—	—	—	—	—	—	—	—	Spotify Singles
“Верше, мій верше“ ("Vershe, miy vershe")	2023	—	—	—	—	—	—	—	—	—	—	—	Non-album singles
“Мій брате“ ("My brother")	2024	—	—	—	—	—	—	—	—	—	—	—	Non-album singles
“КЛИЧУ“ ("I'm Calling") (with MONATIK)	2024	—	—	—	—	—	—	—	—	—	—	—	Non-album singles
"—" denotes a single that did not chart or was not released in that territory.

== Filmography ==
Music videos
Year	Song	Director	Cinematographer
2009	History Repeating	Alan Badoev	Yaroslav Pilunskyi
2010	You're Made of Love + (in Russian)	Kateryna Tsaryk	Yuriy Korol
2010	It's Me, Jamala + (in Ukrainian)	Charley Stadler	Fraser Taggart
2011	Smile	Maksym Ksionda	Serhiy Mykhalchuk
2011	Find me	John X Carey	
2012	Я люблю тебя (in Russian)	Serhiy Sarakhanov	Yevheniya Drach, Mykola Bulavskyi
2013	Кактус (in Russian)	Denys Zakharov	Denys Zakharov
2013	All These Simple Things	Oleksandr Milov	—
2013	Depends On You + (in Russian)	Viktor Vilks	Yaroslav Pilunskyi
2014	Чому? (in Ukrainian)	Denys Zakharov, Oles Sanin	Serhiy Mykhalchuk
2015	Заплуталась (in Ukrainian)	Anatoliy Sachivko	Mykyta Kuzmenko
2015	Иные (in Russian)	Mikhail Emelianov	Viktor Fedoseev
2016	Шлях додому (in Ukrainian)	Anna Kopylova	Denys Lushchyk
2016	1944	Anatoliy Sachivko	Mykyta Kuzmenko
2016	Обещание (in Russian)	Denys Zakharov, Olena Demianenko	Oleksiy Moskalenko
2017	I Believe in U	Ihor Stekolenko	Denys Lushchyk
2017	Сумую (in Ukrainian)	Ihor Stekolenko	Denys Lushchyk
2018	Ти любов моя (in Ukrainian)	Oleh Malamuzh	Teodor Neshchadym
2018	Крила (in Ukrainian + in Kazakh)	Anna Kopylova	Anton Fursa
2018	The Great Pretender	Anna Buriachkova	Svitlana Aparina
2019	Solo	Anna Buriachkova	Svitlana Aparina
2019	Ціна правди (in Ukrainian)	Kateryna Tsaryk, Agnieszka Holland	Yuriy Korol
2019	Забирай (in Ukrainian)	Anton Shtuka	Ivan Fomichenko
2020	Жалі (in Ukrainian)	Dmytro Cherniavskyi	Anton Fursa
2020	Эндорфины (in Russian)	Maksym Kotskyi	Dmytro Cherniavskyi
2021	Вірю в тебе (in Ukrainian)	Anna Kopylova	Anton Fursa
2021	Моя земля (in Ukrainian)	Nazar Dorosh	Nazar Dorosh
2021	Потайки (in Ukrainian)	Oleksandr Guzhelya	Ilya Sostanovskyi
2021	Новий рік з тобою (in Ukrainian)	Tima Darmenov	Vlad Penkov

Film
Year	Title	Role	Ref.
2014	The Guide	Olha Levytska	
2017	Jamala.UA	Herself	
2020	Eurovision Song Contest: The Story of Fire Saga	Herself	

Television
Year	Title	Role	Ref.
2009	Like Cossacks...	Singer in a bar	
2010	Anatomy of a Voice. Jamala	Herself	
2010	The True Story Of Scarlet Sails	Cuban singer	
2013	Kvitka. A voice in a single copy	Herself	
2013	Trading Lives	Host	
2014	Alice's Adventures in Wonderland	Caterpillar	
2016	My truth	Herself	
2016	Look at yourself!	Herself	
2017	Jamalas kamp	Herself	
2018	Crimea: Russia’s Dark Secret	Herself	
2024	Grimsburg	Ekaterina	

== Notes ==
Awards and achievements
Preceded by Mariya Yaremchuk with "Tick-Tock"	Ukraine in the Eurovision Song Contest; 2016	Succeeded by O.Torvald with "Time"
Preceded by (Sweden) Måns Zelmerlöw with "Heroes"	Winner of the Eurovision Song Contest; 2016	Succeeded by (Portugal) Salvador Sobral with "Amar pelos dois"
