= Michael Hayvoronsky =

Ukrainian Musician

Michael O. Hayvoronsky
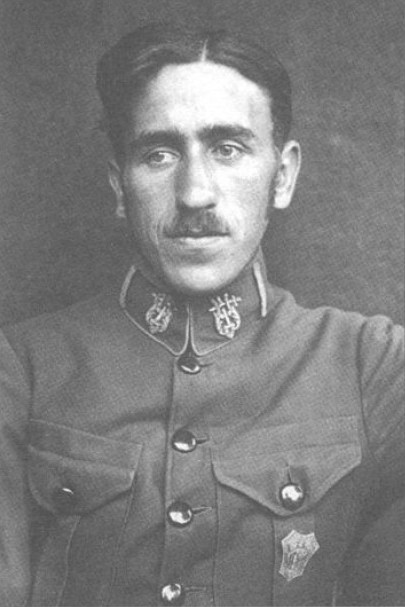
- Michael Hayvoronsky

Background information
- Birth name: Mykhailo Orest Haivoronsky (Михайло Орест Гайворонський)
- Born: September 15, 1892; Zalischyky, (now Ukraine, then part of the Austro-Hungarian Empire)
- Died: September 11, 1949; New York City, United States
- Occupation(s): Composer; Violinist; Conductor; Teacher
- Instrument(s): violin, voice

Michael Orest Hayvoronsky (Mykhailo Orest Haivoronsky) (Ukrainian: Михайло Орест Гайворонський) (September 15, 1892 – September 11, 1949) was a Ukrainian composer, musician, conductor, teacher, violinist, and critic.

== Biography ==
=== Ukraine ===
Michael Hayvoronsky was born on September 15 (O.S. September 1), 1892 in Zalischyky, in the Podilia region. After graduating from the Zalischyky seminary in 1912, he went to study in the Mykola Lysenko music institute in Lviv. At the beginning of World War I there was a nationalistic independence movement of Halych, which Hayvoronsky took part. He was the organizer, conductor, and inspector of many orchestras. In the early 1920s Michael took an active part in musical life. He taught at the Mykola Lysenko music institute in Lviv, was a teacher of music at a girl's gymnasium, and conducted the combined choirs: Boyan and Bandurist.

=== United States ===
In 1923, M. Hayvoronsky moved to the United States, to New York City. There he founded a Music Conservatory in 1924 and lectured at the Columbia University. Later, he organized a Ukrainian Instrumental Orchestra, which he directed until 1936. Hayvoronsky also organized and conducted a combined choir with singers from seven church choirs, with whom he had big concerts of his own works from 1932 to 1936. From the second half of the 1930s and on, the composer focused more on composing music, and supporting Ukrainian youth in America. Hayvoronsky died on September 11, 1949, in New York and is buried there.

== Works ==
Michael Hayvoronsky's most famous songs include over 30 rifleman's (striletski) songs (some based on his own poems), the Dovbush Rhapsody, overtures, and dances and marches for wind orchestra.

=== America ===
In America, significant works composed by Hayvoronsky include:

- the Symphonic Allegro
- the waltz Chervona Kalyna
- quartets for violin trio:
  - Morozenko
  - Christmas Suite
  - Kolomiyka
- violin pieces:
  - Eulogy
  - Kolyskova
  - Song without words
  - Serenade
  - Sonatina

=== Choir ===
M. Hayvoronsky also made the choir collections:

- Carols and shchedrivkas
- The Hutsul Christmas
- two Liturgies
- two Izhe Kheruvym

=== Theatre ===
His most famous theatre works:

- Viy
- Dovbush
- Hetman Doroshenko

== Sources ==
- Wytwycky W. Michael O. hayvoronsky - Life and work NY, 1954
