= X-Factor (Ukrainian TV series) =

Ukrainian television series

- Ukrainian: X-фактор
- Created by: Simon Cowell
- Presented by: Daria Tregubova (10); Oksana Marchenko (1-7); Andriy Bednyakov (7-9)
- Judges: Igor Kondratiuk (1-6, 10); Andriy Danylko (7-10); Anastasia Kamenskykh (8-10); Olya Polyakova (10); Seryoga (1-4); Yolka (1-2); Sergey Sosedov (1-6); Irina Dubtsova (3-4); Ivan Dorn (5); Nino Katamadze (5-6); Andriy Khlyvnyuk (6); Konstantin Meladze (7); Anton Savlepov (7); Julia Sanina (7); Oleg Vinnik (8-9); Dmytro Shurov (8-9)
- Country of origin: Ukraine
- Original languages: Ukrainian (main); Russian (secondary)
- No. of seasons: 10

Production
- Producers: Andriy Nikolov; Halyna Pilytikova; Ruslan Horodnychyi
- Running time: 78 minutes

Original release
- Network: STB
- Release: 4 September 2010 – 28 December 2019

X-Factor (Ukrainian: X-фактор) is the Ukrainian version of The X Factor, a show originating from the United Kingdom. It is a television music talent show for aspiring pop singers drawn from public auditions. Auditions were held in major cities of Ukraine: Dnipro, Lviv, Donetsk, Kharkiv, Kyiv, Poltava, Korosten, Zaporizhzhia, Simferopol, Mykolaiv, Chernivtsi, Uzhhorod, Lutsk, and Rivne.

So far there have been ten winners of the show: Oleksiy Kuznetsov, Viktor Romanchenko, Aida Nikolaychuk, Alexander Poryadinsky, Dmitry Babak, Kostyantyn Bocharov, Sevak Khanagyan, Misha Panchishyn, ZBSband and Elina Ivashchenko.

== Series overview ==
To date, ten seasons have been broadcast, as summarised below.

- Contestant in (or mentor of) "Ihor Kondratuik"
- Contestant in (or mentor of) "Sergei Sosedov"
- Contestant in (or mentor of) "Seryoga"
- Contestant in (or mentor of) "Yolka"
- Contestant in (or mentor of) "Irina Dubtsova"
- Contestant in (or mentor of) "Ivan Dorn"
- Contestant in (or mentor of) "Nino Katamadze"
- Contestant in (or mentor of) "Andriy Hlivnyuk"
- Contestant in (or mentor of) "Andriy Danylko"
- Contestant in (or mentor of) "Konstantin Meladze"
- Contestant in (or mentor of) "Anton Savlepov"
- Contestant in (or mentor of) "Yulia Sanina"
- Contestant in (or mentor of) "Oleg Vinnik"
- Contestant in (or mentor of) "Dmytro Shurov"
- Contestant in (or mentor of) "Anastasia Kamenskykh"
- Contestant in (or mentor of) "Olya Polyakova"

Season	First aired	Last aired	Winner	Runner-up	Third Place	Fourth Place	Winning mentor	Hosts	Chairs (order)			
Season	First aired	Last aired	Winner	Runner-up	Third Place	Fourth Place	Winning mentor	Hosts	1	2	3	4
1	4 September 2010	8 January 2011	Oleksiy Kuznetsov	Mariya Rak	Oleksandr Kryvoshapko	Volodymyr Tkachenko	Yolka	Oksana Marchenko	Sergey Sosedov	Yolka	Seryoga	Ihor Kondratiuk
2	27 August 2011	31 December 2011	Viktor Romanchenko	Oleh Kenzov	Vladislav Kurasov	Arkadiy and Malika	Seryoga	Oksana Marchenko	Sergey Sosedov	Yolka	Seryoga	Ihor Kondratiuk
3	5 September 2012	5 January 2013	Aida Nikolaychuk	Eugene Litvinkovich	Oleksiy Smirnov	Dmytro Sysoev	Ihor Kondratyuk	Oksana Marchenko	Sergey Sosedov	Irina Dubtsova	Seryoga	Ihor Kondratiuk
4	31 August 2013	4 January 2014	Oleksandr Poryadinskiy	Tryoda	Sergiy Gladyr	Two Voices	Irina Dubtsova	Oksana Marchenko	Sergey Sosedov	Irina Dubtsova	Seryoga	Ihor Kondratiuk
5	23 August 2014	27 December 2014	Dmytro Babak	Extreme	Kyrylo Kaplunovskiy	Valeriya Simulik	Nino Katamadze	Oksana Marchenko	Sergey Sosedov	Nino Katamadze	Ivan Dorn	Ihor Kondratiuk
6	22 August 2015	26 December 2015	Kostyantyn Bocharov	Bogdan Sovyk	Alina Pash	Natalia Papazoglou	Ihor Kondratyuk	Oksana Marchenko	Sergey Sosedov	Nino Katamadze	Andriy Khlyvnyuk	Ihor Kondratiuk
7	27 August 2016	24 December 2016	Sevak Khanagyan	Detach	Mountain Breeze	Vitold Petrovsky	Anton Savlepov	Oksana Marchenko; Andriy Bednyakov	Andriy Danylko	Julia Sanina	Anton Savlepov	Konstantin Meladze
8	2 September 2017	30 December 2017	Misha Panchishyn	Yurcash	Dasha Stupak	Olena Zuyeva	Dmytro Shurov	Andriy Bednyakov	Andriy Danylko	NK	Dmytro Shurov	Oleg Vinnik
9	1 September 2018	29 December 2018	ZBSband	Dmytro Volkanov	Mark Savin	Olha Zhmurina	Anastasia Kamenskykh	Andriy Bednyakov	Andriy Danylko	NK	Dmytro Shurov	Oleg Vinnik
10	14 September 2019	28 December 2019	Elina Ivashchenko	Georgiy Koldun	Anton Velboy	Mariia Stopnyk	Ihor Kondratyuk	Daria Tregubova	Andriy Danylko	NK	Olya Polyakova	Ihor Kondratiuk

== Judges' categories and their contestants ==
Key:

Judge
Guest judge

Judges	Season									
Judges	1	2	3	4	5	6	7	8	9	10
Ihor Kondratiuk										
Sergey Sosedov										
Seryoga										
Yolka										
Irina Dubtsova										
Ivan Dorn										
Nino Katamadze										
Andriy Khlyvnyuk										
Andriy Danylko										
Konstantin Meladze										
Julia Sanina										
Anton Savlepov										
Anastasia Kamenskykh										
Oleg Vinnik										
Dmytro Shurov										
Alessandro Safina										
Olya Polyakova										

In each season, each judge is allocated a category to mentor and chooses three acts to progress to the live shows. This table shows, for each season, which category each judge was allocated and which acts he or she put through to the live shows.

– Winning judge/category. Winners are in bold, eliminated contestants in small font.

Series	Ihor Kondratiuk	Seryoga	Yolka	Sergey Sosedov
1	**Girls**; Mariya Rak; Tetiana Zotova; Mariya Stasiyk	**Groups**; Deti Capitana Granta; Serhiy Semionov and Oleksandr Pavlyk; Dmytro Monatyk and Ivan Safarov	**Boys**; **Oleksiy Kuznetsov**; Oleksandr Kryvoshapko; Dmytro Skalozybov	**Over 25s** Volodymyr Tkachenko; Iryna Borysiuk; Yuriy Bohuslavskyi
2	**Boys**; Oleh Kenzov; Vladislav Kurasov; Roman Veremeychik	**Girls**; Svitlana Vinnik; Yevheniya Taraikovych; Valeriya Loktenko	**Groups**; Arkadiy and Malika; Maximum; AQUA	**Over 25s** **Viktor Romanchenko**; Anna Ohrichka; Volodymyr Kulikov
3	Ihor Kondratiuk	Seryoga	Irina Dubtsova	Sergey Sosedov
3	**Over 25s** **Aida Nikolaychuk**; Eugene Litvinkovich; Jakov Golovko	**Boys**; Oleksiy Smirnov; Dmytro Sysoev; Ilya Efimov	**Groups**; D-version; 3D; Violetta and Anatoly	**Girls**; Julia Plaksina; Zhanna Peregon; Melena Passa
4	**Groups**; Tryoda; Two Voices; Clay Grim	**Girls**; Daria Kovtun; Mariya Katseva; Anastasia Rubtsova	**16-18s** **Oleksandr Poryadinskiy**; Danylo Ruvynsky; Nikita Lomakin	**Boys**; Sergiy Gladyr; Michail Mostovoy; Evhen Shpachenko
5	Ihor Kondratiuk	Ivan Dorn	Nino Katamadze	Sergey Sosedov
5	**Over 25s** Iryna Vasilenko; Vladislav Pavliuk; Vladislav Ulyanich	**Girls**; Valeriya Simulik; Olesya Matakova; Santa Danelevicha	**Boys**; **Dmytro Babak**; Kyrylo Kaplunovskiy; Artur Logay	**Groups**; Extreme; Tipazhi; Ray Band
6	Ihor Kondratiuk	Andriy Khlyvnyuk	Nino Katamadze	Sergey Sosedov
6	**Boys**; **Kostyantyn Bocharov**; Andriy Inkin; Beso Nemsadze	**Groups**; White Tower; Epolets; Sparkle	**Girls**; Alina Pash; Nini Nutsubidze; Tatia Kobaladze	**Over 25s** Bogdan Sovyk; Natalia Papazoglou; Kristine Martiashvili
7	Konstantin Meladze	Anton Savlepov	Yulia Sanina	Andriy Danylko
7	Vitold Petrovsky; Ruslana Kiryushenko; Konstantin Biteev	**Sevak Khanagyan**; Alexey Kudryavtsev «Bez Obmezhen'»	«Detach» «The Hypnotunez» Dasha Sokolovskaya; Pavlo Pigura & Vitaly Sychak	«Mountain Breeze» Iryna Brovkina; Oleksandr Yupatov
8	Oleg Vinnik	Anastasia Kamenskykh	Dmytro Shurov	Andriy Danylko
8	**Over 30s** Olena Zuyeva; Mykola Ilyin; Olena Romanovska	**Girls**; Dasha Stupak; Anya Trubetskaya; Kseniya Popova	**Boys**; **Misha Panchishyn**; Ivan Varava; Ostap Storokhod	**Groups**; Yurcash; Kablukami po bruschatke Kazka
9	**Girls**; Olha Zhmurina; Palina; Margaryta Dvoynenko	**Groups**; **ZBSband**; Duke Time; Jazzforacat	**Over 30s** Mark Savin; Olha Tsepkalo; Oleksandr Ryabenko	**Boys**; Dmytro Volkanov; Petro Harasymiv; Ivan Ishchenko; Oleksandr Ilykha
10	Ihor Kondratiuk	Anastasia Kamenskykh	Olya Polyakova	Andriy Danylko
10	**Girls**; **Elina Ivashchenko**; Mariia Stopnyk; Yuliya Bordunova	**Boys**; Anton Velboy; Artem Zabelin; Yuriy Kanalosh	**Over 30s** Georgiy Koldun; Anna Ivanytsya; Liudmyla Bazyliuk	**Groups**; Romax; Furman Trash Polka Band; Chudovi

== Format ==
The show follows the format of the original British X Factor. Created in 2004 by renowned British music executive and producer Simon Cowell and the production company FremantleMedia, the format has since become an international success. Adapted versions of the show have been shown in over 20 countries worldwide. By now the "X-Factor" format has become one of the most popular singing talent shows in the world, and the winners in each country often go on to be successful recording artists.

"X Factor" (English) - the word idiom: a character trait that has no clear definition and explanation; talent. In the context of the show - "X-Factor" - part of the "star" in person "star " talent.

=== Auditions ===
The show's main aim is to find unique singing talent with a bright personality, stage presence and dance skills are also important elements that the judges are looking for. The contestants are divided into four categories: boys, girls, over 25 years old and groups.

Selection of participants is divided into four stages:

- Step 1: Producers' auditions (these auditions pave the way to the next stage with the judges, but they are not broadcast or acknowledged on the show)
- Step 2: Judges' auditions
- Step 3: Bootcamp
- Step 4: Judges' houses

=== Live shows ===
The finals consist of two shows: during the first each act performs once, or later in the series twice, and the second show is the results show, where the public vote. The judges mentor a category, where they are responsible for three final acts each.

During the first live broadcast each of the contestants perform one song in front of a studio audience and the judges, usually all the contestants sing live to a backing track. Some performances are accompanied by choreography and instruments. After the song, the judges comment on the performance, and often there is some competition between the judges' views. The lines for voting opens immediately after all the contestants have performed. When there are just 4 or 5 acts left, the format changes a little, with two songs performed by each act. Three acts remain until the grand final where the public vote alone chooses the winner of the series.

=== Results ===
Before announcing the results of the previous show, a famous star usually take to the stage and performs. Afterwards the results, in no particular order, are announced. The presenter announces who goes through to the follow week, leaving the final bottom two. These two acts go head to head and have to sing for survival. The judges then decide, with one vote each, who should go through to the following week and who should be eliminated. If there is a tie, the result goes to 'dead lock' where the public vote is used again, and the act with the lowest number of votes leaves the show. The details of the votes are never announced, as this may influence subsequent votes in future weeks.

Later in the series when there are just a few acts left, the judges do not vote, only comment on the performances. Only the public vote counts in the results shows.

== Season 1 (2010-2011) ==
The first season of Ukrainian X-Factor began on 4 September 2010, presented by Oksana Marchenko. The judges were: showman Ihor Kondratiuk, singer Yolka, rapper Seryoga and music critic Sergei Sosedov. The winner was Oleksiy Kuznetsov (in Ukrainian Олексій Кузнецов) mentored by Yolka with Mariya Rak (in Ukrainian Марія Рак) mentored by Ihor Kondratiuk as runner-up

=== Contestants ===
– Winner
– Runner-Up

Category (mentor)	Acts		
Boys (Yolka)	Oleksandr Kryvoshapko	Oleksiy Kuznetsov	Dmytro Skalozybov
Girls (Kondratiuk)	Mariya Rak	Mariya Stasiyk	Tetiana Zotova
Over 25s (Sosedov)	Yuriy Bohuslavskyi	Iryna Borysiuk	Volodymyr Tkachenko
Groups (Seryoga)	Deti Capitana Granta	Dmytro Monatyk and Ivan Safarov	Serhiy Semionov and Oleksandr Pavlyk

=== Position X-Factor ===
Colour key

–	Contestant was in the bottom two/three and had to perform again in the sing-off
–	Contestant received the fewest public votes and was immediately eliminated (no final showdown)
–	Contestant received the most public votes

Contestant	Week 1	Week 2	Week 3	Week 4	Week 5	Week 6	Week 7	Week 8	Week 9	Final	
Contestant	Week 1	Week 2	Week 3	Week 4	Week 5	Week 6	Week 7	Week 8	Week 9	Round One	Round Two
Oleksiy Kuznetsov	Safe	Safe	Safe	Safe	Safe	Safe	Safe	Safe	Safe	Safe	Winner
Mariya Rak	Bottom two	Safe	Safe	Safe	Safe	Bottom two	Safe	Safe	Safe	Safe	Runner-up
Oleksandr Kryvoshapko	Safe	Safe	Safe	Safe	Safe	Safe	Bottom two	Safe	Safe	3rd	Eliminated
Volodymyr Tkachenko	Safe	Safe	10th	Safe	Safe	Safe	Safe	Safe	Safe	4th	Eliminated
Iryna Borysiuk	Safe	Safe	Safe	Safe	Safe	Safe	Safe	Safe	5th	Eliminated (week 9)	
Deti Capitana Granta	Safe	10th	Safe	Bottom two	8th	Safe	Safe	Safe	6th	Eliminated (week 9)	
Serhiy Semionov and Oleksandr Pavlyk	Safe	Safe	Safe	Safe	Safe	Safe	Bottom two	7th	Eliminated (week 8)		
Tetiana Zotova	Safe	Safe	Safe	Safe	Safe	Bottom two	Eliminated (week 6)				
Dmytro Monatik and Ivan Safarov	Safe	Safe	Safe	Safe	9th	Eliminated (week 5)					
Dmytro Skalozybov	Safe	11th	Safe	Bottom two	Eliminated (week 4)						
Mariya Stasiyk	Safe	Safe	11th	Eliminated (week 3)							
Yuriy Bohuslavskyi	Bottom two	Eliminated (week 1)									
Bottom two	Mariya Rak, Yuriy Bohuslavskyi	Deti Capitana Granta, Dmytro Skalozybov	Mariya Stasiyk, Volodymyr Tkachenko	Deti Capitana Granta, Dmytro Skalozybov	Deti Capitana Granta, Dmytro Monatik and Ivan Safarov	Mariya Rak, Tetiana Zotova	Oleksandr Kryvoshapko, Serhiy Semionov and Oleksandr Pavlyk	The act that received the fewest public votes was automatically eliminated.			
Judges voted to eliminate:	Eliminate							The act that received the fewest public votes was automatically eliminated.			
Kondratiuk's vote to eliminate:	Yuriy Bohuslavskyi	Deti Capitana Granta	Volodymyr Tkachenko	Dmytro Skalozybov	Dmytro Monatik and Ivan Safarov	Has not voted	Oleksandr Kryvoshapko	The act that received the fewest public votes was automatically eliminated.			
Seryoga's vote to eliminate:	Yuriy Bohuslavskyi	Dmytro Skalozybov	Mariya Stasiyk	Dmytro Skalozybov	Deti Capitana Granta	Tetiana Zotova	Oleksandr Kryvoshapko	The act that received the fewest public votes was automatically eliminated.			
Sosedov's vote to eliminate:	Mariya Rak	Dmytro Skalozybov	Mariya Stasiyk	Dmytro Skalozybov	Dmytro Monatik and Ivan Safarov	Tetiana Zotova	Oleksandr Kryvoshapko	The act that received the fewest public votes was automatically eliminated.			
Yolka's vote to eliminate:	Yuriy Bohuslavskyi	Deti Capitana Granta	Volodymyr Tkachenko	Deti Capitana Granta	Deti Capitana Granta	Tetiana Zotova	Serhiy Semionov and Oleksandr Pavlyk	The act that received the fewest public votes was automatically eliminated.			
Eliminated:	Yuriy Bohuslavskyi; 3 of 4 votes Majority	No Elimination	Mariya Stasiyk; 2 of 4 votes Deadlock	Dmytro Skalozybov; 3 of 4 votes Majority	Dmytro Monatik and Ivan Safarov; 2 of 4 votes Deadlock	Tetiana Zotova; 3 of 3 votes Majority	No Elimination	Serhiy Semionov and Oleksandr Pavlyk; Public votes to save	Deti Capitana Granta; Public votes to save	Volodymyr Tkachenko; Public votes to win	Mariya Rak; Public votes to win
Eliminated:	Yuriy Bohuslavskyi; 3 of 4 votes Majority	No Elimination	Mariya Stasiyk; 2 of 4 votes Deadlock	Dmytro Skalozybov; 3 of 4 votes Majority	Dmytro Monatik and Ivan Safarov; 2 of 4 votes Deadlock	Tetiana Zotova; 3 of 3 votes Majority	No Elimination	Serhiy Semionov and Oleksandr Pavlyk; Public votes to save	Iryna Borysiuk; Public votes to save	Oleksandr Kryvoshapko; Public votes to win	Mariya Rak; Public votes to win

== Season 2 (2011-2012) ==
The second season of Ukrainian X-Factor was launched in August 2011 with live broadcasts starting on 22 October 2011. The shows presenter remained Oksana Marchenko. The judges were also the same: showman Ihor Kondratiuk, singer Yolka, rapper Seryoga and music critic Sergei Sosedov. The winner was Viktor Romanchenko (in Ukrainian Віктор Романченко) from Over 25s category mentored by Seyoga with Oleh Kenzov (in Ukrainian Олег Кензов) from Boys category mentored by Ihor Kondratiuk as runner-up. The final was broadcast 31 December 2011 with results announced in the finale on 1 January 2012.

=== Contestants ===
– Winner
– Runner-up

Category (mentor)	Acts		
Boys (Kondratiuk)	Roman Veremeychik	Oleh Kenzov	Vladislav Kurasov
Girls (Sosedov)	Svitlana Vinnik	Yevheniya Taraikovych	Valeriya Loktenko
Over 25s (Seryoga)	Volodymyr Kulikov	Viktor Romanchenko	Anna Ohrichka
Groups (Yolka)	Arkadiy and Malika	Maximum	AQUA

=== Position X-Factor 2 ===
Colour key

–	Contestant was in the bottom two/three and had to perform again in the sing-off
–	Contestant received the fewest public votes and was immediately eliminated (no final showdown)
–	Contestant received the most public votes

Contestant	Week 1	Week 2	Week 3	Week 4	Week 5	Week 6	Week 7	Week 8	Week 9	Final	
Contestant	Week 1	Week 2	Week 3	Week 4	Week 5	Week 6	Week 7	Week 8	Week 9	Round One	Round Two
Viktor Romanchenko	Safe	Safe	Safe	Safe	Safe	Safe	Safe	Safe	Safe	Safe	Winner
Oleh Kenzov	Safe	Safe	Safe	Safe	Safe	Safe	Safe	Safe	Safe	Safe	Runner-up
Vladislav Kurasov	Safe	Safe	Safe	Safe	Safe	Safe	Bottom two	Safe	Safe	3rd	Eliminated
Arkadiy and Malika	Safe	Safe	Safe	Safe	Safe	Safe	Safe	Safe	4th	Eliminated (week 9)	
Roman Veremeychik	Safe	Safe	Safe	Safe	Safe	Safe	Safe	5th	Eliminated (week 8)		
Svitlana Vinnik	Safe	Safe	Safe	Safe	7th	Bottom two	Bottom two	Eliminated (week 7)			
Anna Ohrichka	Safe	10th	Safe	8th	Safe	Bottom two	Eliminated (week 6)				
Volodymyr Kulikov	Safe	Safe	Safe	Safe	8th	Eliminated (week 5)					
Yevheniya Taraikovych	Safe	Safe	Bottom two	9th	Eliminated (week 4)						
Maximum	Bottom two	Safe	Bottom two	Eliminated (week 3)							
Valeriya Loktenko	Safe	11th	Eliminated (week 2)								
AQUA	Bottom two	Eliminated (week 1)									
Bottom two	AQUA, Maximum	Anna Ohrichka, Valeriya Loktenko	Maximum, Yevheniya Taraikovych	Anna Ohrichka, Yevheniya Taraikovych	Svitlana Vinnik, Volodymyr Kulikov	Anna Ohrichka, Svitlana Vinnik	Svitlana Vinnik, Vladislav Kurasov	The act that received the fewest public votes was automatically eliminated.			
Judges voted to eliminate:	Eliminate							The act that received the fewest public votes was automatically eliminated.			
Kondratiuk's vote to eliminate:	AQUA	Anna Ohrichka	Maximum	Anna Ohrichka	Volodymyr Kulikov	Anna Ohrichka	Svitlana Vinnik	The act that received the fewest public votes was automatically eliminated.			
Seryoga's vote to eliminate:	AQUA	Valeriya Loktenko	Maximum	Yevheniya Taraikovych	Svitlana Vinnik	Svitlana Vinnik	Svitlana Vinnik	The act that received the fewest public votes was automatically eliminated.			
Sosedov's vote to eliminate:	Maximum	Anna Ohrichka	Maximum	Anna Ohrichka	Volodymyr Kulikov	Anna Ohrichka	Vladislav Kurasov	The act that received the fewest public votes was automatically eliminated.			
Yolka's vote to eliminate:	None (refused)	Valeriya Loktenko	Yevheniya Taraikovych	Yevheniya Taraikovych	Svitlana Vinnik	N/A	Svitlana Vinnik	The act that received the fewest public votes was automatically eliminated.			
Eliminated:	AQUA; 2 of 3 votes Majority	Valeriya Loktenko; 2 of 4 votes Deadlock	Maximum; 3 of 4 votes Majority	Yevheniya Taraikovych; 2 of 4 votes Deadlock	Volodymyr Kulikov; 2 of 4 votes Deadlock	Anna Ohrichka; 2 of 3 votes Majority	Svitlana Vinnik; 3 of 4 votes Majority	Roman Veremeychik; Public votes to save	Arkadiy and Malika; Public votes to save	Vladislav Kurasov; Public votes to win	Oleh Kenzov; Public votes to win

== Season 3 (2012-2013) ==
=== Contestants ===
– Winner
– Runner-up

Category (mentor)	Acts		
Boys (Seryoga)	Ilya Efimov	Oleksiy Smirnov	Dmytro Sysoev
Girls (Sosedov)	Melena Passa	Julia Plaksina	Zhanna Peregon
Over 25s (Kondratiuk)	Eugene Litvinkovich	Jakov Golovko	Aida Nikolaychuk
Groups (Dubcova)	D-version	Violetta and Anatoly	3D

=== Position X-Factor 3 ===
Colour key

–	Contestant was in the bottom two/three and had to perform again in the sing-off
–	Contestant received the fewest public votes and was immediately eliminated (no final showdown)
–	Contestant received the most public votes

Contestant	Week 1	Week 2	Week 3	Week 4	Week 5	Week 6	Week 7	Week 8	Week 9	Final	
Contestant	Week 1	Week 2	Week 3	Week 4	Week 5	Week 6	Week 7	Week 8	Week 9	Round One	Round Two
Aida Nikolaychuk	Safe	Safe	Safe	Safe	Safe	Safe	Safe	Safe	Safe	Safe	Winner
Eugene Litvinkovich	Safe	Safe	Safe	Safe	Safe	Safe	Safe	Safe	Safe	Safe	Runner-up
Oleksiy Smirnov	Safe	Safe	Safe	Safe	Safe	Safe	Safe	Safe	Safe	3rd	Eliminated
Dmytro Sysoev	Safe	Bottom two	Safe	Safe	Safe	Safe	5th	Safe	4th	Eliminated (week 9)	
D-version	Safe	Safe	Bottom two	Safe	Bottom two	6th	Safe	5th	Eliminated (week 8)		
Julia Plaksina	Safe	Safe	Safe	Safe	Safe	Safe	6th	Eliminated (week 7)			
Jakov Golovko	Safe	Safe	Safe	Safe	Safe	7th	Eliminated (week 6)				
3D	11th	Safe	Safe	Bottom two	Bottom two	Eliminated (week 5)					
Zhanna Peregon	Safe	Safe	Safe	Bottom two	Eliminated (week 4)						
Ilya Efimov	Safe	Safe	Bottom two	Eliminated (week 3)							
Violetta and Anatoly	Safe	Bottom two	Eliminated (week 2)								
Melena Passa	12th	Eliminated (week 1)									
Bottom two	3D, Melena Passa	Dmytro Sysoev, Violetta and Anatoly	D-version, Ilya Efimov	3D, Zhanna Peregon	3D, D-version	Jakov Golovko, D-version	Dmytro Sysoev, Julia Plaksina	The act that received the fewest public votes was automatically eliminated.			
Judges voted to eliminate:	Eliminate							The act that received the fewest public votes was automatically eliminated.			
Dubcova's vote to eliminate:	Melena Passa	Dmytro Sysoev	Ilya Efimov	Zhanna Peregon	None (refused)	Jakov Golovko	Dmytro Sysoev	The act that received the fewest public votes was automatically eliminated.			
Kondratiuk's vote to eliminate:	Melena Passa	Violetta and Anatoly	Ilya Efimov	Zhanna Peregon	3D	D-version	Julia Plaksina	The act that received the fewest public votes was automatically eliminated.			
Seryoga's vote to eliminate:	3D	Violetta and Anatoly	D-version	Zhanna Peregon	3D	Jakov Golovko	Julia Plaksina	The act that received the fewest public votes was automatically eliminated.			
Sosedov's vote to eliminate:	3D	Violetta and Anatoly	Ilya Efimov	3D	D-version	D-version	Dmytro Sysoev	The act that received the fewest public votes was automatically eliminated.			
Eliminated:	Melena Passa; 2 of 4 votes Deadlock	Violetta and Anatoly; 3 of 4 votes Majority	Ilya Efimov; 3 of 4 votes Majority	Zhanna Peregon; 3 of 4 votes Majority	3D; 2 of 3 votes Majority	Jakov Golovko; 2 of 4 votes Deadlock	Julia Plaksina; 2 of 4 votes Deadlock	D-version; Public votes to save	Dmytro Sysoev; Public votes to save	Oleksiy Smirnov; Public votes to win	Eugene Litvinkovich; Public votes to win

== Season 4 (2013-2014) ==
=== Contestants ===
– Winner
– Runner-up

Category (mentor)	Acts		
Boys (Sosedov)	Evhen Shpachenko	Sergiy Gladyr	Michail Mostovoy
Girls (Seryoga)	Mariya Katseva	Daria Kovtun	Anastasia Rubtsova
16-18s (Dubcova)	Oleksandr Poryadinskiy	Danylo Ruvynsky	Nikita Lomakin
Groups (Kondratiuk)	Clay Grim	Two Voices	Tryoda

=== Position X-Factor 4 ===
Colour key

–	Contestant was in the bottom two/three and had to perform again in the sing-off
–	Contestant received the fewest public votes and was immediately eliminated (no final showdown)
–	Contestant received the most public votes

Contestant	Week 1	Week 2	Week 3	Week 4	Week 5	Week 6	Week 7	Week 8	Week 9	Final	
Contestant	Week 1	Week 2	Week 3	Week 4	Week 5	Week 6	Week 7	Week 8	Week 9	Round One	Round Two
Oleksandr Poryadinskiy	Safe	Safe	Safe	Safe	Safe	Safe	Safe	Safe	Safe	Safe	Winner
Tryoda	Safe	Safe	Safe	Safe	Safe	Safe	Safe	Safe	Safe	Safe	Runner-Up
Sergiy Gladyr	Safe	Safe	Safe	Safe	Safe	6th	Safe	Safe	Safe	3rd	Eliminated
Two Voices	Safe	10th	Safe	Safe	7th	Safe	Bottom two	Safe	4th	Eliminated (week 9)	
Daria Kovtun	Safe	Safe	Safe	Safe	Safe	Safe	Safe	5th	Eliminated (week 8)		
Michail Mostovoy	Safe	Safe	Safe	Safe	Safe	Safe	Bottom two	Eliminated (week 7)			
Danylo Ruvynsky	Safe	Safe	Safe	Safe	Safe	7th	Eliminated (week 6)				
Mariya Katseva	Safe	Safe	Safe	Bottom two	8th	Eliminated (week 5)					
Nikita Lomakin	Safe	Safe	9th	Bottom two	Eliminated (week 4)						
Clay Grim	11th	Safe	10th	Eliminated (week 3)							
Anastasia Rubtsova	Safe	11th	Eliminated (week 2)								
Evhen Shpachenko	12th	Eliminated (week 1)									
Bottom two	Clay Grim, Evhen Shpachenko	Anastasia Rubtsova, Two Voices	Clay Grim, Nikita Lomakin	Mariya Katseva, Nikita Lomakin	Mariya Katseva, Two Voices	Danylo Ruvynsky, Sergiy Gladyr	Michail Mostovoy, Two Voices	The act that received the fewest public votes was automatically eliminated.			
Judges voted to eliminate:	Eliminate							The act that received the fewest public votes was automatically eliminated.			
Dubcova's vote to eliminate:	Clay Grim	Two Voices	Clay Grim	Mariya Katseva	Two Voices	Sergiy Gladyr	Michail Mostovoy	The act that received the fewest public votes was automatically eliminated.			
Kondratiuk's vote to eliminate:	Evhen Shpachenko	Anastasia Rubtsova	Nikita Lomakin	Nikita Lomakin	Mariya Katseva	Danylo Ruvynsky	Michail Mostovoy	The act that received the fewest public votes was automatically eliminated.			
Seryoga's vote to eliminate:	Evhen Shpachenko	Two Voices	Clay Grim	Nikita Lomakin	Two Voices	Sergiy Gladyr	Michail Mostovoy	The act that received the fewest public votes was automatically eliminated.			
Sosedov's vote to eliminate:	Clay Grim	Anastasia Rubtsova	Nikita Lomakin	Nikita Lomakin	Mariya Katseva	Danylo Ruvynsky	Two Voices	The act that received the fewest public votes was automatically eliminated.			
Eliminated:	Evhen Shpachenko; 2 of 4 votes Deadlock	Anastasia Rubtsova; 2 of 4 votes Deadlock	Clay Grim; 2 of 4 votes Deadlock	Nikita Lomakin; 3 of 4 votes Majority	Mariya Katseva; 2 of 4 votes Deadlock	Danylo Ruvynsky; 2 of 4 votes Deadlock	Michail Mostovoy; 3 of 4 votes Majority	Daria Kovtun; Public votes to save	Two Voices; Public votes to save	Sergiy Gladyr; Public votes to win	Tryoda; Public votes to win

== Season 5 (2014) ==
=== Contestants ===
– Winner
– Runner-up

Category (mentor)	Acts		
Boys (Katamadze)	Artur Logay	Dmytro Babak	Kyrylo Kaplunovskiy
Girls (Dorn)	Olesya Matakova	Santa Danelevicha	Valeriya Simulik
Over 25s (Kondratiuk)	Iryna Vasilenko	Vladislav Pawluk	Vladislav Ulyanich
Groups (Sosedov)	Extreme	Ray Band	Tipazhi

=== Position X-Factor 5 ===
Colour key

–	Contestant was in the bottom two/three and had to perform again in the sing-off
–	Contestant was in the bottom three but received the fewest votes and was immediately eliminated
–	Contestant received the fewest public votes and was immediately eliminated (no final showdown)
–	Contestant received the most public votes

Contestant	Week 1	Week 2	Week 3	Week 4	Week 5	Week 6	Week 7	Week 8
Dmytro Babak	Safe	Safe	Safe	Safe	Bottom three	Bottom three	Safe	Winner
Extreme	Safe	Safe	Safe	Safe	Safe	Safe	Safe	Runner-Up
Kyrylo Kaplunovskiy	Safe	Safe	Safe	Safe	Safe	Safe	3rd	Eliminated
Valeriya Simulik	Safe	Safe	Safe	Safe	Safe	Bottom three	Eliminated (week 6)	
Olesya Matakova	Safe	Safe	Safe	Bottom three	Safe	5th	Eliminated (week 6)	
Iryna Vasilenko	Safe	Safe	Safe	Safe	Bottom three	Eliminated (week 5)		
Vladislav Pavliuk	Bottom two	Safe	Safe	Safe	7th	Eliminated (week 5)		
Vladislav Ulyanich	Safe	Bottom two	Safe	Bottom three	Eliminated (week 4)			
Santa Danelevicha	Safe	Safe	Bottom two	9th	Eliminated (week 4)			
Artur Logay	Safe	Safe	Bottom two	Eliminated (week 3)				
Tipazhi	Safe	Bottom two	Eliminated (week 2)					
Ray Band	Bottom two	Eliminated (week 1)						
Bottom two	Vladislav Pavliuk, Ray Band	Tipazhi, Vladislav Ulyanich	Artur Logay, Santa Danelevicha	Olesya Matakova, Vladislav Ulyanich	Iryna Vasilenko, Dmytro Babak	Valeriya Simulik, Dmytro Babak	The act that received the fewest public votes was automatically eliminated.	
Judges voted to eliminate:	Eliminate						The act that received the fewest public votes was automatically eliminated.	
Katamadze's vote to eliminate:	Ray Band	Tipazhi	Santa Danelevicha	Vladislav Ulyanich	Iryna Vasilenko	Valeriya Simulik	The act that received the fewest public votes was automatically eliminated.	
Kondratiuk's vote to eliminate:	Ray Band	Tipazhi	Artur Logay	Olesya Matakova	Dmytro Babak	Valeriya Simulik	The act that received the fewest public votes was automatically eliminated.	
Dorn's vote to eliminate:	Ray Band	Tipazhi	Artur Logay	Vladislav Ulyanich	Iryna Vasilenko	Dmytro Babak	The act that received the fewest public votes was automatically eliminated.	
Sosedov's vote to eliminate:	Vladislav Pavliuk	Vladislav Ulyanich	Artur Logay	Vladislav Ulyanich	Iryna Vasilenko	Valeriya Simulik	The act that received the fewest public votes was automatically eliminated.	
Eliminated:	Ray Band; 3 of 4 votes Majority	Tipazhi; 3 of 4 votes Majority	Artur Logay; 3 of 4 votes Majority	Santa Danelevicha; Fewest votes to save	Vladislav Pavliuk; Fewest votes to save	Olesya Matakova; Fewest votes to save	Kyrylo; Kaplunovskiy; Fewest votes to win	Extreme; Fewest votes to win
Eliminated:	Ray Band; 3 of 4 votes Majority	Tipazhi; 3 of 4 votes Majority	Artur Logay; 3 of 4 votes Majority	Vladislav Ulyanich; 3 of 4 votes Majority	Iryna Vasilenko; 3 of 4 votes Majority	Valeriya Simulik; 3 of 4 votes Majority	Kyrylo; Kaplunovskiy; Fewest votes to win	Extreme; Fewest votes to win

== Season 6 (2015) ==
=== Contestants ===
– Winner
– Runner-up

Category (mentor)	Acts		
Boys (Kondratiuk)	Beso Nemsadze	Kostyantyn Bocharov	Andriy Inkin
Girls (Katamadze)	Alina Pash	Tatia Kobaladze	Nini Nutsubidze
Over 25s (Sosedov)	Kristine Martiashvili	Natalia Papazoglou	Bogdan Sovyk
Groups (Hlivnyuk)	Sparkle	White Tower	Epolets

=== Position X-Factor 6 ===
Colour key

–	Contestant was in the bottom two/three and had to perform again in the sing-off
–	Contestant was in the bottom three but received the fewest votes and was immediately eliminated
–	Contestant received the fewest public votes and was immediately eliminated (no final showdown)
–	Contestant received the most public votes

Contestant	Week 1	Week 2	Week 3	Week 4	Week 5	Week 6	Week 7	Week 8
Kostyantyn Bocharov	Safe	Safe	Safe	Safe	Safe	Safe	Safe	Winner
Bogdan Sovyk	Safe	Safe	Safe	Safe	Safe	3rd	Safe	Runner-Up
Alina Pash	Safe	Safe	Safe	Safe	5th	Safe	3rd	Eliminated
Natalia Papazoglou	Safe	Safe	Safe	Safe	Safe	4th	Eliminated (week 6)	
White Tower	Safe	Safe	Safe	Safe	Safe	5th	Eliminated (week 6)	
Epolets	Safe	Safe	Safe	7th	6th	Eliminated (week 5)		
Andriy Inkin	Safe	Safe	Safe	Safe	7th	Eliminated (week 5)		
Kristine Martiashvili	11th	Safe	Bottom two	8th	Eliminated (week 4)			
Nini Nutsubidze	Safe	Safe	Safe	9th	Eliminated (week 4)			
Sparkle	Safe	Bottom two	Bottom two	Eliminated (week 3)				
Tatia Kobaladze	Safe	Bottom two	Eliminated (week 2)					
Beso Nemsadze	12th	Eliminated (week 1)						
Bottom two	Beso Nemsadze, Kristine Martiašvili	Sparkle, Tatia Kobaladze	Kristine Martiashvili, Sparkle	Epolets, Kristine Martiašvili	Alina Pash, Epolets	Bogdan Sovyk, Natalia Papazoglou	The act that received the fewest public votes was automatically eliminated.	
Judges voted to eliminate:	Eliminate						The act that received the fewest public votes was automatically eliminated.	
Hlivnyuk's vote to eliminate:	Beso Nemsadze	Tatia Kobaladze	Kristine Martiashvili	Kristine Martiashvili	Alina Pash	Bogdan Sovyk	The act that received the fewest public votes was automatically eliminated.	
Katamadze's vote to eliminate:	Kristine Martiashvili	Sparkle	Sparkle	Kristine Martiashvili	Epolets	Bogdan Sovyk	The act that received the fewest public votes was automatically eliminated.	
Kondratiuk's vote to eliminate:	Kristine Martiashvili	Tatia Kobaladze	Sparkle	Epolets	Epolets	Natalia Papazoglou	The act that received the fewest public votes was automatically eliminated.	
Sosedov's vote to eliminate:	Beso Nemsadze	Tatia Kobaladze	Sparkle	Epolets	Alina Pash	Natalia Papazoglou	The act that received the fewest public votes was automatically eliminated.	
Eliminated:	Beso Nemsadze; 2 of 4 votes Deadlock	Tatia Kobaladze; 3 of 4 votes Majority	Sparkle; 3 of 4 votes Majority	Nini Nutsubidze; Fewest votes to save	Andriy Inkin; Fewest votes to save	White Tower; Fewest votes to save	Alina Pash; Fewest votes to win	Bogdan Sovyk; Fewest votes to win
Eliminated:	Beso Nemsadze; 2 of 4 votes Deadlock	Tatia Kobaladze; 3 of 4 votes Majority	Sparkle; 3 of 4 votes Majority	Kristine Martiashvili; 2 of 4 votes Deadlock	Epolets; 2 of 4 votes Deadlock	Natalia Papazoglou; 2 of 4 votes Deadlock	Alina Pash; Fewest votes to win	Bogdan Sovyk; Fewest votes to win

== Season 7 (2016) ==
=== Contestants ===
– Winner
– Runner-up

Mentor	Acts			
Konstantin Meladze	Konstantin Biteev	Vitold Petrovsky	Ruslana Kiryushenko	
Yulia Sanina	Pavlo Pigura & Vitaly Sychak	Dasha Sokolovskaya	«Detach»	«The Hypnotunez»
Verka Serduchka (Andriy Danylko)	«Mountain Breeze»	Oleksandr Yupatov	Iryna Brovkina	
Anton Savlepov	Sevak Khanagyan	Alexey Kudryavtsev	«Bez Obmezhen'»	

=== Position X-Factor 7 ===
Colour key

–	Contestant was in the bottom two/three and had to perform again in the sing-off
–	Contestant was in the bottom three but received the fewest votes and was immediately eliminated
–	Contestant received the fewest public votes and was immediately eliminated (no final showdown)
–	Contestant received the most public votes

Contestant	Week 1	Week 2	Week 3	Week 4	Week 5	Week 6	Week 7	Week 8
Sevak Khanagyan	Safe	Safe	Safe	Safe	Safe	Safe	Safe	Winner
«Detach»	Safe	Safe	Safe	Safe	Bottom three	Safe	Safe	Runner-Up
«Mountain Breeze»	Safe	Safe	Safe	Safe	Safe	3rd	3rd	Eliminated
Vitold Petrovsky	Safe	Safe	Safe	Safe	Safe	4th	Eliminated (week 6)	
«The Hypnotunez»	Safe	Safe	Safe	7th	Safe	5th	Eliminated (week 6)	
Alexey Kudryavtsev	Safe	Safe	Bottom two	Safe	Bottom three	Eliminated (week 5)		
Dasha Sokolovskaya	Safe	Safe	Safe	Safe	7th	Eliminated (week 5)		
Pavlo Pigura & Vitaly Sychak	Safe	Safe	Safe	8th	Eliminated (week 4)			
«Bez Obmezhen'»	Safe	Safe	Safe	9th	Eliminated (week 4)			
Ruslana Kiryushenko	Safe	Bottom two	Bottom two	Eliminated (week 3)				
Konstantin Biteev	Bottom three	Bottom two	Eliminated (week 2)					
Iryna Brovkina	Bottom three	Eliminated (week 1)						
Oleksandr Yupatov	13th	Eliminated (week 1)						
Bottom two	Konstantin Biteev, Iryna Brovkina	Konstantin Biteev, Ruslana Kiryushenko	Ruslana Kiryushenko, Alexey Kudryavtsev	«The Hypnotunez», Pavlo Pigura & Vitaly Sychak	«Detach», Alexey Kudryavtsev	«Mountain Breeze», Vitold Petrovsky	The act that received the fewest public votes was automatically eliminated.	
Judges voted to eliminate:	Eliminate						The act that received the fewest public votes was automatically eliminated.	
Meladze's vote to eliminate:	Iryna Brovkina	Konstantin Biteev	Alexey Kudryavtsev	«The Hypnotunez»	Alexey Kudryavtsev	«Mountain Breeze»	The act that received the fewest public votes was automatically eliminated.	
Sanina's vote to eliminate:	Iryna Brovkina	Konstantin Biteev	Ruslana Kiryushenko	«The Hypnotunez»	Alexey Kudryavtsev	Vitold Petrovsky	The act that received the fewest public votes was automatically eliminated.	
Danylko's vote to eliminate:	Konstantin Biteev	Ruslana Kiryushenko	Ruslana Kiryushenko	Pavlo Pigura & Vitaly Sychak	Alexey Kudryavtsev	Vitold Petrovsky	The act that received the fewest public votes was automatically eliminated.	
Savlepov's vote to eliminate:	Iryna Brovkina	Konstantin Biteev	Ruslana Kiryushenko	Pavlo Pigura & Vitaly Sychak	«Detach»	«Mountain Breeze»	The act that received the fewest public votes was automatically eliminated.	
Eliminated:	Oleksandr Yupatov; Fewest votes to save	Konstantin Biteev; 3 of 4 votes Majority	Ruslana Kiryushenko; 3 of 4 votes Majority	«Bez Obmezhen'» Fewest votes to save	Dasha Sokolovskaya; Fewest votes to save	«The Hypnotunez» Fewest votes to save	«Mountain Breeze» Fewest votes to win	«Detach» Fewest votes to win
Eliminated:	Iryna Brovkina; 3 of 4 votes Majority	Konstantin Biteev; 3 of 4 votes Majority	Ruslana Kiryushenko; 3 of 4 votes Majority	Pavlo Pigura & Vitaly Sychak; 2 of 4 votes Deadlock	Alexey Kudryavtsev; 3 of 4 votes Majority	Vitold Petrovsky; 2 of 4 votes Deadlock	«Mountain Breeze» Fewest votes to win	«Detach» Fewest votes to win

== Season 8 (2017) ==
=== Contestants ===
– Winner
– Runner-up

Category (mentor)	Acts			
Boys (Shurov)	Ivan Varava	Misha Panchishyn	Ostap Skorokhod	
Girls (Kamenskykh)	Dasha Stupak	Anya Trubetskaya	Kseniya Popova	Veta Kozakova
Over 30s (Vinnik)	Mykola Ilyin	Olena Romanovska	Olena Zuyeva	
Groups (Danylko)	«Kablukami po bruschatke»	«Yurcash»	«KAZKA»	

=== Position X-Factor 8 ===
Colour key

–	Contestant was in the bottom two/three and had to perform again in the sing-off
–	Contestant was in the bottom three but received the fewest votes and was immediately eliminated
–	Contestant received the fewest public votes and was immediately eliminated (no final showdown)
–	Contestant received the most public votes

Contestant	Week 1	Week 2	Week 3	Week 4	Week 5	Week 6	Week 7	Week 8
Misha Panchishyn	Safe	Safe	Safe	Safe	Safe	Safe	Safe	Winner
«Yurcash»	Safe	Safe	Safe	Safe	Safe	Safe	Safe	Runner-up
Dasha Stupak	Safe	Safe	Safe	Safe	Safe	Bottom three	3rd	Eliminated
Olena Zuyeva	Safe	Safe	Safe	Safe	Safe	Bottom three	Eliminated (week 6)	
«Kablukami po bruschatke»	Safe	Safe	Safe	Safe	Bottom three	5th	Eliminated (week 6)	
Mykola Ilyin	Safe	Safe	Safe	Safe	Bottom three	Eliminated (week 5)		
«KAZKA»	Safe	Safe	Safe	Bottom three	7th	Eliminated (week 5)		
Anya Trubetskaya	Safe	Safe	Bottom two	Bottom three	Eliminated (week 4)			
Olena Romanovska	Safe	10th	Safe	9th	Eliminated (week 4)			
Ivan Varava	Safe	Safe	Bottom two	Eliminated (week 3)				
Ostap Skorokhod	11th	11th	Eliminated (week 2)					
Kseniya Popova	12th	Eliminated (week 1)						
Veta Kozakova	13th	Eliminated (week 1)						
Bottom two	Ostap Skorokhod, Kseniya Popova	Olena Romanovska, Ostap Skorokhod	Ivan Varava, Anya Trubetskaya	Anya Trubetskaya, «KAZKA»	Mykola Ilyin, «Kablukami po bruschatke»	Dasha Stupak, Olena Zuyeva	The act that received the fewest public votes was automatically eliminated.	
Judges voted to eliminate:	Eliminate						The act that received the fewest public votes was automatically eliminated.	
Shurov's vote to eliminate:	Kseniya Popova	Olena Romanovska	Anya Trubetskaya	Anya Trubetskaya	Mykola Ilyin	Olena Zuyeva	The act that received the fewest public votes was automatically eliminated.	
Vinnik's vote to eliminate:	Kseniya Popova	Ostap Skorokhod	Ivan Varava	Anya Trubetskaya	«Kablukami po bruschatke»	Dasha Stupak	The act that received the fewest public votes was automatically eliminated.	
Danylko's vote to eliminate:	Ostap Skorokhod	Olena Romanovska	Ivan Varava	Anya Trubetskaya	Mykola Ilyin	Olena Zuyeva	The act that received the fewest public votes was automatically eliminated.	
Kamenskykh's vote to eliminate:	Ostap Skorokhod	Ostap Skorokhod	Ivan Varava	«KAZKA»	Mykola Ilyin	Olena Zuyeva	The act that received the fewest public votes was automatically eliminated.	
Eliminated:	Veta Kozakova; Fewest votes to save	Ostap Skorokhod; 2 of 4 votes Deadlock	Ivan Varava; 3 of 4 votes Majority	Olena Romanovska; Fewest votes to save	«KAZKA» Fewest votes to save	«Kablukami po bruschatke» Fewest votes to save	Dasha Stupak; Fewest votes to win	«Yurcash» Fewest votes to win
Eliminated:	Kseniya Popova; 2 of 4 votes Deadlock	Ostap Skorokhod; 2 of 4 votes Deadlock	Ivan Varava; 3 of 4 votes Majority	Anya Trubetskaya; 3 of 4 votes Majority	Mykola Ilyin; 3 of 4 votes Majority	Olena Zuyeva; 3 of 4 votes Majority	Dasha Stupak; Fewest votes to win	«Yurcash» Fewest votes to win

== Season 9 (2018) ==
=== Contestants ===
– Winner
– Runner-up

Category (mentor)	Acts			
Boys (Danylko)	Ivan Ishchenko	Oleksandr Ilykha	Petro Harasymiv	Dmytro Volkanov
Girls (Vinnik)	Palina	Olha Zhmurina	Margaryta Dvoynenko	
Over 30s (Shurov)	Mark Savin	Olha Tsepkalo	Oleksandr Ryabenko	
Groups (Kamenskykh)	Duke Time	Jazzforacat	ZBSband	

=== Position X-Factor 9 ===
Colour key

–	Contestant was in the bottom two/three and had to perform again in the sing-off
–	Contestant received the fewest public votes and was immediately eliminated (no final showdown)
–	Contestant received the most public votes

Contestant	Week 1	Week 2	Week 3	Week 4	Week 5	Week 6
ZBSband	Safe	Safe	Safe	Safe	Safe	Winner
Dmytro Volkanov	Safe	Safe	Safe	Safe	Safe	Runner-up
Mark Savin	Safe	Safe	Safe	Safe	3rd-4th	Eliminated (week 5)
Olha Zhmurina	Safe	Safe	Bottom three	Bottom three	3rd-4th	Eliminated (week 5)
Duke Time	Safe	Safe	Safe	Bottom three	Eliminated (week 4)	
Petro Harasymiv	Safe	Safe	Safe	Bottom three	Eliminated (week 4)	
Palina	Safe	Safe	Bottom three	Eliminated (week 3)		
Ivan Ishchenko	Safe	Safe	Bottom three	Eliminated (week 3)		
Jazzforacat	Safe	Bottom three	Eliminated (week 2)			
Margaryta Dvoynenko	Safe	Bottom three	Eliminated (week 2)			
Olha Tsepkalo	Bottom three	Bottom three	Eliminated (week 2)			
Oleksandr Ilykha	Bottom three	Eliminated (week 1)				
Oleksandr Ryabenko	Bottom three	Eliminated (week 1)				
Bottom three	Oleksandr Ilykha, Oleksandr Ryabenko, Olha Tsepkalo	Jazzforacat, Margaryta Dvoynenko, Olha Tsepkalo	Ivan Ishchenko, Olha Zhmurina, Palina	Duke Time, Olha Zhmurina, Petro Harasymiv	The act that received the fewest public votes was automatically eliminated.	
Judges voted to:	Save				The act that received the fewest public votes was automatically eliminated.	
Shurov's vote to save:	Olha Tsepkalo	Olha Tsepkalo	Palina	Olha Zhmurina	The act that received the fewest public votes was automatically eliminated.	
Vinnik's vote to save:	Olha Tsepkalo	Margaryta Dvoynenko	Olha Zhmurina	Olha Zhmurina	The act that received the fewest public votes was automatically eliminated.	
Danylko's vote to save:	Oleksandr Ilykha	–	Ivan Ishchenko	Petro Harasymiv	The act that received the fewest public votes was automatically eliminated.	
Kamenskykh's vote to save:	Olha Tsepkalo	Jazzforacat	Olha Zhmurina	Duke Time	The act that received the fewest public votes was automatically eliminated.	
Eliminated	Oleksandr Ilykha; 1 of 4 votes to save Minority	Jazzforacat; 1 of 4 votes to save Minority	Palina; 1 of 4 votes to save Minority	Duke Time; 1 of 4 votes to save Minority	Mark Savin; Fewest votes to save	Dmytro Volkanov; Fewest votes to win
Eliminated	Oleksandr Ilykha; 1 of 4 votes to save Minority	Olha Tsepkalo; 1 of 4 votes to save Minority	Palina; 1 of 4 votes to save Minority	Duke Time; 1 of 4 votes to save Minority	Mark Savin; Fewest votes to save	Dmytro Volkanov; Fewest votes to win
Eliminated	Oleksandr Ryabenko; 0 of 4 votes to save Minority	Margaryta Dvoynenko; 1 of 4 votes to save Minority	Ivan Ishchenko; 1 of 4 votes to save Minority	Petro Harasymiv; 1 of 4 votes to save Minority	Olha Zhmurina; Fewest votes to save	Dmytro Volkanov; Fewest votes to win

== Season 10 (2019) ==
=== Contestants ===
– Winner
– Runner-up

Category (mentor)	Acts		
Boys (Kamenskykh)	Yuriy Kanalosh	Anton Velboy	Artem Zabelin
Girls (Kondratiuk)	Yuliya Bordunova	Elina Ivashchenko	Mariia Stopnyk
Over 30s (Polyakova)	Liudmyla Bazyliuk	Anna Ivanytsya	Georgiy Koldun
Groups (Danylko)	Chudovi	Furman Trash Polka Band	Romax

=== Position X-Factor 10 ===
Colour key

–	Contestant was in the bottom two/three and had to perform again in the sing-off
–	Contestant was in the bottom three but received the fewest votes and was immediately eliminated
–	Contestant received the fewest public votes and was immediately eliminated (no final showdown)
–	Contestant received the most public votes

Contestant	Week 1	Week 2	Week 3	Week 4	Week 5
Elina Ivashchenko	Safe	Safe	Safe	Safe	Winner
Georgiy Koldun	Safe	Safe	Safe	Safe	Runner-up
Anton Velboy	Safe	Safe	Safe	3rd-4th	Eliminated (week 4)
Mariia Stopnyk	Bottom two in category	Safe	Bottom three	3rd-4th	Eliminated (week 4)
Romax	Safe	Bottom three	Bottom three	Eliminated (week 3)	
Anna Ivanytsya	Bottom two in category	Safe	6th	Eliminated (week 3)	
Artem Zabelin	Bottom two in category	Bottom three	Eliminated (week 2)		
Furman Trash Polka Band	Bottom two in category	8th	Eliminated (week 2)		
Chudovi	Bottom two in category	Eliminated (week 1)			
Yuriy Kanalosh	Bottom two in category	Eliminated (week 1)			
Yuliya Bordunova	Bottom two in category	Eliminated (week 1)			
Liudmyla Bazyliuk	Bottom two in category	Eliminated (week 1)			
Bottom	Mariia Stopnyk, Yuliya Bordunova, Artem Zabelin, Yuriy Kanalosh, Anna Ivanytsya, Liudmyla Bazyliuk, Furman Trash Polka Band, Chudovi	Romax, Artem Zabelin	Romax, Mariia Stopnyk	The act that received the fewest public votes was automatically eliminated.	
Judges voted to:	Save			The act that received the fewest public votes was automatically eliminated.	
Kondratiuk's vote to save:	Mariia Stopnyk	Romax	Mariia Stopnyk	The act that received the fewest public votes was automatically eliminated.	
Polyakova's vote to save:	Anna Ivanytsya	Romax	Mariia Stopnyk	The act that received the fewest public votes was automatically eliminated.	
Kamenskykh's vote to save:	Artem Zabelin	Artem Zabelin	Mariia Stopnyk	The act that received the fewest public votes was automatically eliminated.	
Danylko's vote to save:	Furman Trash Polka Band	Romax	Romax	The act that received the fewest public votes was automatically eliminated.	
Eliminated	Chudovi; Not saved by Danylko	Furman Trash Polka Band; Fewest votes to save	Anna Ivanytsya; Fewest votes to save	Anton Velboy; Fewest votes to save	Georgiy Koldun; Fewest votes to win
Eliminated	Yuriy Kanalosh; Not saved by Kamenskykh	Furman Trash Polka Band; Fewest votes to save	Anna Ivanytsya; Fewest votes to save	Anton Velboy; Fewest votes to save	Georgiy Koldun; Fewest votes to win
Eliminated	Yuliya Bordunova; Not saved by Kondratiuk	Artem Zabelin; 1 of 4 votes to save Minority	Romax; 1 of 4 votes to save Minority	Mariia Stopnyk; Fewest votes to save	Georgiy Koldun; Fewest votes to win
Eliminated	Liudmyla Bazyliuk; Not saved by Polyakova	Artem Zabelin; 1 of 4 votes to save Minority	Romax; 1 of 4 votes to save Minority	Mariia Stopnyk; Fewest votes to save	Georgiy Koldun; Fewest votes to win
