= ST1M =

Russian rapper (born 1986)

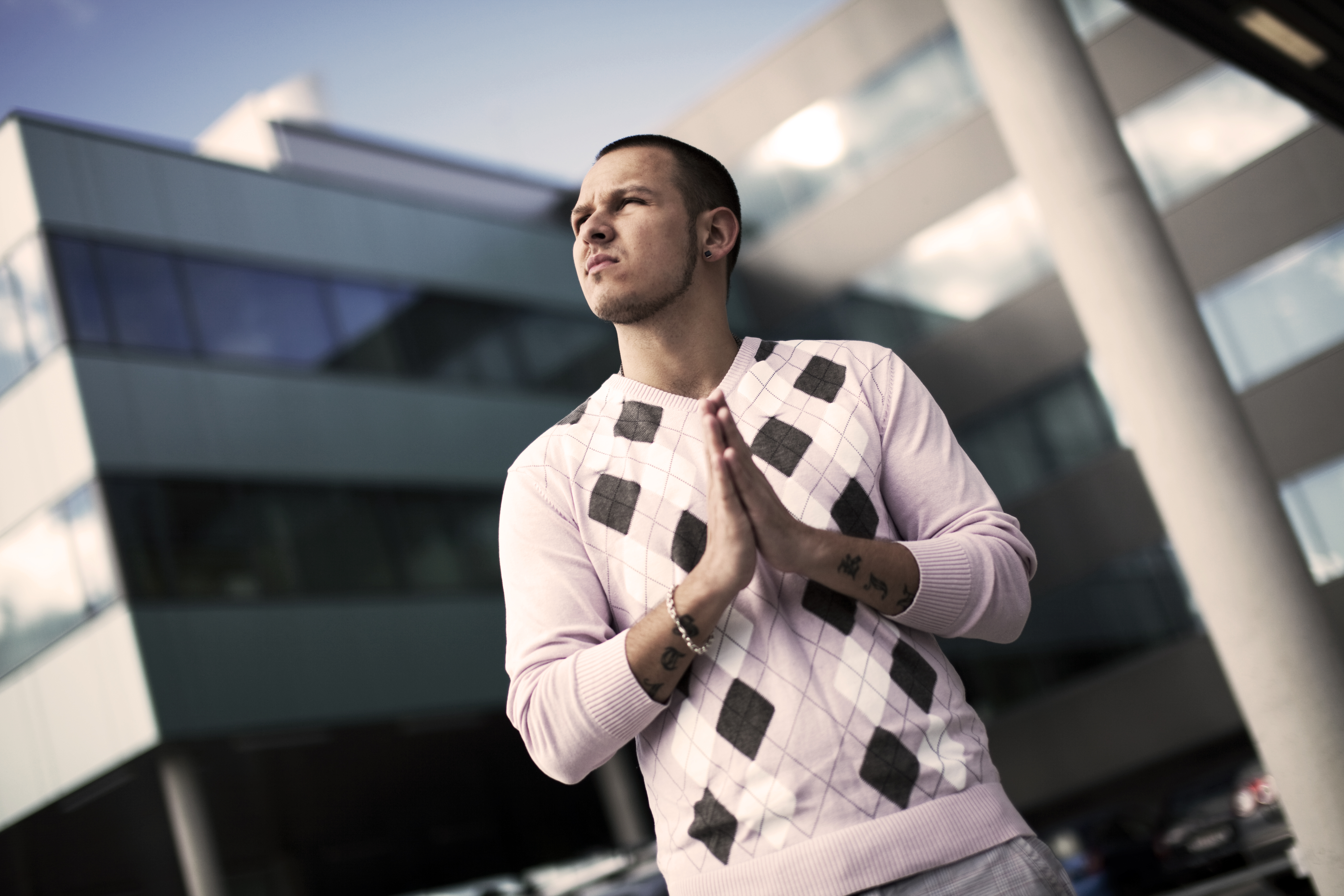

Background information
- Also known as: Billy Milligan
- Born: November 4, 1986 (age 39); Tolyatti, USSR
- Genres: Hip hop
- Occupation: Musician
- Years active: 2005–present
- Labels: KingRing (2007-2010), Аггробабруйск (Aggrobabruysk) (2008-2010)
- Formerly of: ВиСтанция (V-Station), "63 регион" (63rd Region), Опасные Умы (Dangerous Minds), Подземный переход (Pedestrian Subway), Focus
- Website: www.st1m.ru www.billymilligan.ru

ST1M (a.k.a. Billy Milligan) (real name Nikita Legostev, Russian: Никита Сергеевич Легостев) is a Russian rapper from Tolyatti, Russia. He was the winner of the Hip-hop.ru Awards 2013 in nominations: "Best music video", "Performer of the year", "Opening of the year" (as Billy Milligan).

Born November 4, 1986. Since 2005 participated in the group "Подземный переход" (Underground crossing). In 2005 he won in the Internet-battle on Hip-hop.ru when he entered the TOP-10 Russian MC's of the 2005.

At 2007 he negotiated the contract with Seryoga and recorded his first scandalous album "Я - Рэп" (I`m Rap). But his subsequent singles were more soft and lyrical, in which he was trying to form his new image.

== Discography ==
=== Albums ===
- 2007 - Я - рэп (Ya rap / I`m Rap)
- 2008 - Достучаться до небес (Dostuchatsya do nebes / Knocking On Heaven`s Door)
- 2010 - Октябрь (Oktyabr' / October)
- 2011 - Фотоальбом (Fotoal'bom / Photograph Album)
- 2012 - Когда погаснут фонари (Kogda pogasnut fonari / When The Lights Turn Off) (EP)
- 2013 - Феникс (Phoenix) (feat. Indigo) (EP)
- 2020 - Аггро 2.0 (Aggro 2.0) (feat. SD)

=== Compilations ===
- 2008 - Мир принадлежит тебе (Mir prinadlezhit tebe / The World Is Yours)
- 2013 - Неизданное (Unpublished)

=== Singles ===
- 2007 — Я — рэп (I'm Rap) (longmix; feat. SD, ST, Seryoga, Art, Valachi, Туман (Mist), Mr. Hyde, Biba)
- 2008 — Я так и знал (Ya tak i znal / I Knew It) (feat. Satsura)
- 2008 — Дети улиц (Deti ulits / Children Of The Streets) (feat. Seryoga, Karandash, SD, G-Style)
- 2008 — Мир принадлежит тебе (The World Is Yours) (feat. Satsura & SD)
- 2008 — Прибавь громкость (Pribav' gromkost' / Make It Louder) (feat. SD & Monk)
- 2008 — Это аггро (Eto aggro / This Is Aggro) (feat. SD)
- 2009 — Поцелуй меня (Potseluy menya / Kiss Me) (feat. Lion)
- 2009 — С добрым утром (S dobrym utrom / Good Morning) (feat. Max Lorens)
- 2010 — Спички (Spichki / Matches) (feat. Rita Dakota)
- 2010 — Wavin’ Flag (feat. K’naan)
- 2010 — «Звезда по имени Солнце» (Zvezda po imeni Solntse / The Star Called Sun) (Kino tribute)
- 2010 — Бой с тенью (Boy s ten'yu / Shadow Fight) (feat. Satsura)
- 2010 — Фотоальбом (Photograph Album)
- 2011 — Ты моё лето (Ty - moyo leto / You Are My Summer) (feat. Bianca)
- 2011 — "Horosho" (уч. Liquit Walker)
- 2011 — Clap Your Hands (feat. Frauenarzt)
- 2011 — «Отпуск» (feat. Bianca & NePlagiat)
- 2011 — Добро (Dobro / Good)
- 2011 — «Никогда / Nikogda / Niemals / Never» (feat. Liquit Walker)
- 2011 — Ангел (Angel) (feat. Nelly Ermolaeva)
- 2011 — Ключи (Klyuchi / Keys) (feat. Bianca)
- 2011 — «One Mic One Love»
- 2012 — Высота (Vysota / Height) (feat. NePlagiat)
- 2012 — Верь в это (Ver' v eto / Believe In It)
- 2012 — Космос (Kosmos / Space)
- 2012 — Аэроплан (Airplane)
- 2012 — Tough Fight (soundtrack to "Tough Fight" league)
- 2012 — Снег (Sneg / Snow)
- 2013 — Девочка из прошлого (Devochka iz proshlogo / The Girl From The Past) (feat. Ruki Vverh)
- 2013 — Рядом с тобой (Ryadom s toboy / Close To You) (feat. Rita Dakota)
- 2013 — Нет страха (Net strakha / There Is No Fear) (feat. Indigo)
- 2013 — Цепь (Tsep' / Chain) (feat. Karandash)
- 2013 — Offline (feat. Elvira T)
- 2013 — Коридоры (Corridors)
- 2013 — 4 ноября (November 4)
- 2013 — Выбирай (Vybiray / Make Your Choice)
- 2013 — Быть MC (Byt MC / Being MC)
- 2013 — Мой космос (Moy kosmos / My Space)
- 2013 — Каждый момент (Kazhdy moment / Every Moment) (feat. Elena Bon-Bon)
- 2014 — Час-Пик (Chas-Pik / Peak Hour) (feat. Denis Gladskiy)
- 2015 — Дорога на север (Doroga na sever / The Road to the North)
