= Nikolaychuk =

Nikolaychuk (Ukrainian: Ніколайчук) is a Ukrainian patromymic surname. It may also be rendered as Nikolaichuk.

- Aida Nikolaychuk
- Volodymyr Nikolaychuk
