= Kurasov =

Kurasov (Russian: Курасов) is a Russian masculine surname, its feminine counterpart is Kurasova. It may refer to

- Aleksandr Kurasov (born 1992) Russian acrobatic gymnast
- Vladimir Kurasov (1897–1973), Soviet military leader
- Vladislav Kurasov (born 1995), Ukrainian singer-songwriter
