= Oleksiy Kuznetsov =

Ukrainian singer (born 1991)

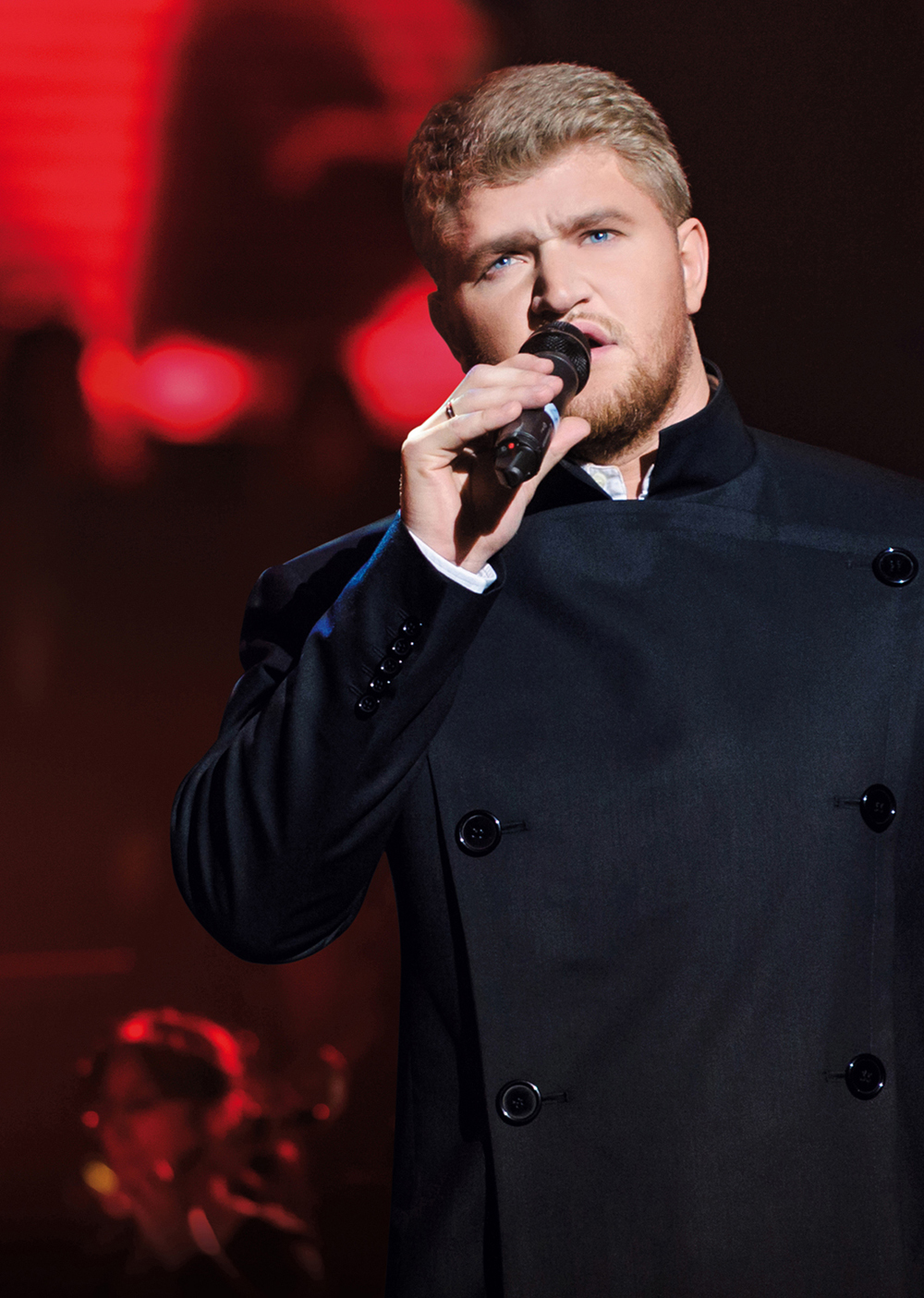
- Oleksiy Kuznetsov
- Born: Олексій Кузнєцов; May 28, 1991 (age 34); Makiivka, Donetsk Oblast, Ukraine
- Occupation: Singer
- Musical career
- Instrument: Vocals

Oleksiy Kuznetsov (Ukrainian: Олексій Кузнєцов) (born 28 May 1991 in Makiivka, Donetsk Oblast, Ukraine) is a Ukrainian singer and the winner of the first season (2009–2010) of the Ukrainian version of the X Factor. He competed in the Under 25 category and was mentored by judge Yolka. He won ₴2 million in cash prizes, as well as a musical contract with Sony Music Russia, a division of Sony Music Entertainment.

His name is alternatively translated Olexiy, Alexey, Alexei and last name Kuznecov. He studied music at the Donetsk Musical College, an academic school of singing, specializing in vocals. He also worked in the Donetsk National Academic Theater of Opera and Ballet. He is also a sportsman and boxer.
