= Eugene Litvinkovich =

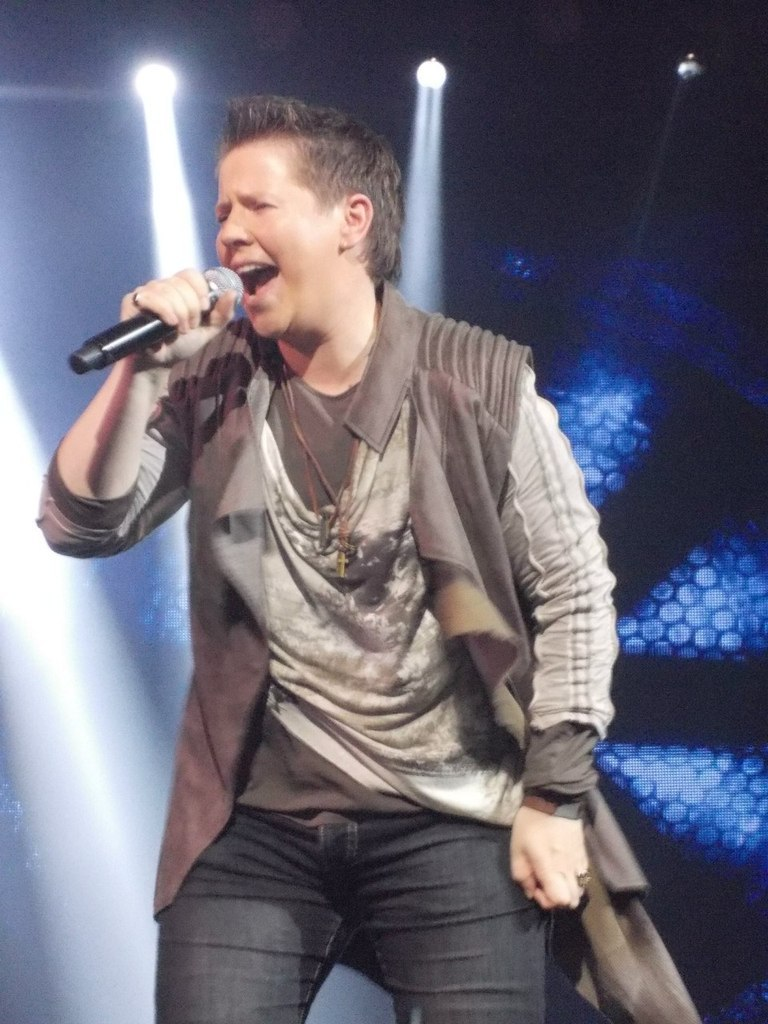
- Litvinkovich in 2013

Background information
- Born: 4 November 1982 (age 42); Zhodino, Belarus
- Genres: Pop-rock, romantic music
- Years active: 2006–present
- Website: litvinkovich.com

Eugene Litvinkovich (born 4 November 1982, Zhodino, Belarus) is a singer born in Belarus and popular in Ukraine, author and performer. The finalist of "Ukraine's Got Talent 4" show in 2013 and super-finalist of "X-factor (Ukraine) 3" show at the beginning of 2013

== Biography ==
=== Childhood and youth ===
Eugene Litvinkovich was born on 4 November 1982 in Zhodino, Belarusian town in the family of shoe maker Mihail Litvinkovich and photographer Nadezhda Litvinkovich. After the early death of his father, his sister Elena was taking care of him.

Since he was 7 years old, Eugene studied at school with in-depth study of music and choreography.

At the age of 10 he entered the art school and later finished it with honor.

At the same time Eugene practiced martial arts (judo and sambo) and became the Candidate for Master of Sport in sambo. After the ninth school grade he entered the college of Art and Restoration, but didn't graduate it and started his activity as private entrepreneur instead. A shop tent with glasses and gloves became his first business experience. After he had earned a certain sum of money, Eugene first established an open air disco club "The Cage", and then organized a night club "Extra", a restaurant "Paradise" and opened a small cafe "At Zheka's"

=== Start of music career ===
While selling glasses and gloves on the market, Eugene also found a half-time job as an audio engineer in local Palace of culture "Rovesnik", where he provided musical accompaniment of rehearsals in the studio of modern song "Silver trill" managed by a voice teacher Nelli Ambartsumian. As Eugene had a talent for singing he was suggested to study singing more professionally.

In 2007 Eugene took part in the local festival "Zhodino Spring" and received his first Grand Prix as a winner in category of performers of 16 to 25 years old, and also a color TV set "Gorizont" as a prize.

In 2009 he became a finalist of the "New voices of Belarus" competition while taking part in a casting of vocalists to Presidential orchestra and performed the song "Friendship" at "Musical nights in Mir Castle" together with a famous Belarusian singer, one of the competitors of "Eurovision 2013" Alyona Lanskaya.

In July, 2009, Eugene became the owner of Grand Prix at X Interregional contest of young performers of modern song in a town of Velizh, Smolensk region, Russia.

During 2009-2010 he took part in the project of ONT channel "Musical court".

In September, 2011, Eugene became the winner of International Festival "Youth of Russia and Belarus together in XXI century" in Mytishchi in category "The best actor" with another foster child of Zhodino studio of modern song in Palace of culture "Silver trill" Valentina Pavlova.

On 24 September 2011 during the concert devoted to the day of the town Zhodino, Eugene Litvinkovich received the highest award of the local Executive Committee, rewarded with the honorary Citation for success in the sphere of culture, which was granted to him by the chairman of Zhodino town Exsecutive Committee Mihail Omelyanchuk and CEO of OJSC "Belaz" Pyotr Parhomchyk.

At the beginning of 2012 Eugene passed the casting of the project "Academy of Talents" on the ONT channel, but left the competition after the first Live Show.

During next 4 years Eugene had been taking part in castings for the "New Wave" contest in years 2010, 2011 (finalist), 2012 (super-finalist). In 2013 he took part in the casting as the representative of Ukraine.

In 2012 he performed at Slavianski Bazaar together with Alyona Lanskaya.

=== Success in Ukraine ===
Ukraine's Got Talent

After passing the initial casting to the show Ukraine's Got Talent 4 in Minsk, Eugene was invited to take part in this contest on the Kharkiv selection in 2012. For the contest Eugene had chosen the song "Sweet People", which was initially presented by Ukrainian singer Alyosha at «Eurovision 2010». The performance had great success among the audience. The decision of the judges was unanimous and Eugene found himself in the semi-final of the show, where he performed live with the song of Lolita Milyavskaya "Moy Fetish" ("My Fetish"). By the decision of judges Eugene left the show but received the invitation from Ihor Kondratyuk (one of the jury members) to take part in another solely vocal talent-show X-Factor. Still, when the organizers of the show "Ukraine's Got Talent" decided to add one more place in the final, Eugene Litvinkovich received this place as the leader of the audience voting. "Katastroficheski" ("Catastriphically"), initially performed by Diana Arbenina, was the contest song that time. By the result of final voting and the decision of the judges Eugene took the 3rd place.

X-Factor In October 2012 Eugene took part in the casting of the third season of the Ukrainian show X-Factor. Having performed the Russian version of the song "Milim" ("The Words") of Harel Skaat, Eugene easily passed selection tours and performed in all 11 live broadcasts of the show. Without getting to the nomination for a single time, Eugene became a super-finalist of the show and took the 2nd place according to the audience voting, leaving the victory to a singer from Odesa Aida Nikolaychuk. After the final of the show Eugene took part in the tour in 19 Ukrainian cities together with other competitors (12 January – 3 February 2013).

=== Solo career ===
Znaki Zodiaka (Zodiac Signs)

After the end of "X-Factor" show, Eugene signed a 5-year contract with the production center of the STB channel and started working on his first album.

On 7 March 2013, during the "Factor of spring" concert devoted to the celebration of the International Women's Day, Eugene presented his first author's song "Znaki Zodiaka" ("Zodiac Signs").

Eugene worked actively on writing his new songs, recording his first album "Znaki Zodiaka" ("Zodiac Signs"), and also performed a lot in a number of Ukrainian cities.

On 14 March 2013, the official site of Eugene Litvinkovich was presented by STB channel.

On 2 and 3 April 2013, the shooting of musical video for the song "Znaki Zodiaka" ("Zodiac Signs") took place. Maxim Litvinov became the director of this work. Musical video was presented on 23 May.

On 6 April 2013, a large-scale fan-meeting with Eugene took place. During the meeting Eugene notified everyone about his first solo concert being planned for 31 May. In the second part of April the tickets sale started and after only one week all of them were sold. Eugene together with STB channel decided to hold additional solo concert the same day. The tickets for the additional concert were also sold in several days. Both solo concerts were held in the assembly hall of the National Music Academy of Ukraine named after P. I. Tchaikovsky (Kyiv Conservatory) with the "sold out" notice.

During the concert the first singer's album "Znaki Zodiaka" ("Zodiac Signs") was also presented. The disc contained the song of the same name as well as two more author's songs "Vot tak-to luchsche" ("This is much better") and "K Tebe" ("To you"), the songs "Mama" (music by L. Shyrin, Y. Vaschuk; lyrics by N. Tambovtseva), and also 4 songs performed during the "X-Factor" show.

K Tebe (To You) After the great success of the first solo concerts Eugene Litvinkovich announced the preparation of the tour around Ukrainian cities. In August the musical video for the song "K Tebe" ("To you") was shot by a famous music video-maker Alexandr Filatovich. The music video was presented on the main square in Kyiv on the big screen after the flash-mob organized by the director and the singer and supported by Eugene's fans.

The tour "K Tebe" ("To you") ran around 14 largest cities of Ukraine took place within the period of 6 to 21 November 2013. Together with the beginning of the tour the first full-fledged Eugene's album was released. The disc included 4 songs from the album "Znaki Zodiaka" ("Zodiac Signs"): "Mama", "K Tebe" ("To you"), "Vot tak-to luchsche" ("This is much better"), "Znaki Zodiaka" ("Zodiac Signs"), as well as new songs most of which were composed by Eugene himself. One song - "Anomalia" ("Anomaly") - was presented on the 16 October 2013 on "M1" Ukrainian music channel.

By the results of the work performed during year 2013, Eugene was awarded as "The Breakthrough of the Year" by the TV-show "Unbelievable truth about the stars" by STB channel.

National casting for the contest of "Eurovision 2014" On 21 December 2013, Eugene took part in the National Casting for the contest of "Eurovision 2014" from Ukraine with the song "Strelyanaya Ptitsa" ("A Shot Bird"). After being selected for the finals of the show, Eugene resulted the 8ths out of 20 participants by the sum of audience and the jury.

Zdes' i Seychas ("Here and now") At the beginning of 2014 the song "Mirazhy" ("Mirages") was released. The song was devoted to the tragic events related to Euromaidan in Ukraine. The author of the song was Eugene's colleague by the "X-factor" show - Mariya Zhytnikova. The work for the new album had been starting.

In May 2014 during the finals of the show Ukraine's Got Talent 6 the head song of the album Zses' i Seychas (Here and Now) was presented as well as the other song in Ukrainian "Diydu do mety" ("I will reach the goal"), written by another participant of the X-factor show Arkadiy Voytyuk.

The same year Eugene and STB channel broke the contract ahead of time and the singer proceeded with his career on his own.

In summer, 2014, Eugene recorded the song "Ohotnitsa" ("The hunter") with the Ukrainian singer Renata Shtifel.

In the second part of 2014 the singer toured a lot around Ukraine. On 25 November the second album "Zses' i Seychas" ("Here and Now") was released and the supporting tour was held. The tour included 12 cities of Ukraine. The new album included the new songs that were written by Eugene and other authors, as well as several songs from the first album "K Tebe" ("To You").

Notre Dame de Paris On 28 and 29 March 2015, in the Concert Hall "Ukraine" in Kyiv, the premiere of the concert-sensation of the songs from the musical "Notre Dame de Paris" took place. Eugene Litvinkovich performed the part of Clopin, the king of the Court of Miracles. During the concert Eugene performed the following arias: «Les Sans-Papiers», «La Cour des Miracles», "Condamnés" - solo, as well as «Fatalité», «Où Est-Elle?», «Libérés», «L’Attaque De Notre-Dame» - together with other solo singers.

Love and peace From 16 April till 27 May 2015, Eugene toured around 20 cities of Ukraine with the concert program "Love and peace". The goal of this tour was to raise positive mood of Ukrainians in the difficult period of war in Donbass. Together with beginning of the tour the 4th disc of Eugene Litvinkovich called "Selected" was released. The disc contained 19 best compositions from the singer's repertoire.

After his returning from the tour, on 29 May, Eugene Litvinkovich was awarded as "The male singer of the year 2014" by the results of Ukrainian contest of public preferences "The Success Favorites".

=== Work and recognition in Belarus ===
At the end of November - beginning of December, 2013, Eugene was invited to perform during the music marathon in the city of Baranovichi. Within this project he performed on the Eve devoted to creative work of Leonid Shirin with the song "Mother", in the concert of the graduates of "The Academy of Talents" show and also received an award "The song of the year 2013".

== Discography ==
=== Albums ===
- Znaki Zodiaka (Zodiac Signs) (2013)
- К Tebe (To You)(2013)
- Zdes' i Seychas (Here and Now) (2014)
- Selected (2015)

=== Videos ===
Year	Video	Director	Album
2013	"Znaki zodiaka"	Maxim Litvinov	"Zodiac Signs"
2013	"K Tebe"	A. Filatovich	"K Tebe"
