= Sergey Sosedov =

Russian journalist and music critic (1968–2026)

- Сергей Соседов
- Sosedov in 2025
- Born: 23 May 1968; Moscow, Russian SFSR, Soviet Union
- Died: 23 September 2026 (aged 58); Neryungri, Sakha, Russia
- Education: Moscow State University
- Occupations: Newspaper journalist; music critic
- Years active: 1989–2026

Sergey Vasilevich Sosedov (Russian: Сергей Васильевич Соседов; 23 May 1968 – 23 September 2026) was a Russian journalist and music critic who served as a judge on televised music contests.

== Early life ==
Sosedov was born in Moscow on 23 May 1968. In 1983, he completed seven years of piano study, taught by Irma Georgievna Paruhova. From 1984 to 1993, he attended lectures on theory and music history. In 1988, he attended courses and directed at the Moscow Regional Institute of Culture. In 1996, he graduated with honors in newspaper and magazine journalism at Moscow State University.

== Career ==
His first published work appeared in the Goudok publication on 14 May 1989. It was an interview with singer Edita Piekha.

Sosedov first worked as a journalist at Goudok (1989–1992), then worked as a correspondent for Russian Conduct (1994–1996) and as a music columnist for the weekly Wednesday (1997–2000).

From 1994 to 1996, he worked as a freelance correspondent for the newspaper Russian Conduct. From January 1997 to July 1998, he worked as a press manager of the operation Concert Hall (now the Academic) of the Russian Academy of Sciences. From December 1998 to April 2000, he was a correspondent for the weekly Wednesday of ZAO Concern Vechernyaya Moskva. From May 2000 to May 2001, he was a music columnist for League Nation.

In June 2001, Sosedov became the music editor browser for ANO Rock Country (PR help in promotion of young rock singers).

He became known after his participation on Shark Pen, which appeared on the Russian channel TV-6 from 1995 to 1998. Later, as an invited expert Sosedov participated in the religious TV program Canon on TV-6. He served on the jury for the TV contest Superstar on Channel NTV from October to December 2007 and from October to December 2008. In September 2010 he was one of four judges on the singing show X-Factor on the Ukrainian TV channel STB.

== Political views ==
In 2014, Sosedov supported the Russian annexation of Crimea. Since 2017, he was using pro‑government rhetoric. He made anti-Ukrainian statements and spoke negatively about Russians who emigrated after Russia's invasion of Ukraine.

== Personal life and death ==
Sosyedov was openly gay.

He died in Neryungri on 23 September 2026, at the age of 58, after sustaining a head injury following a fall from stairs during a tour.
