= Aida Nikolaychuk =

Ukrainian singer and model

Aida Nikolaichuk
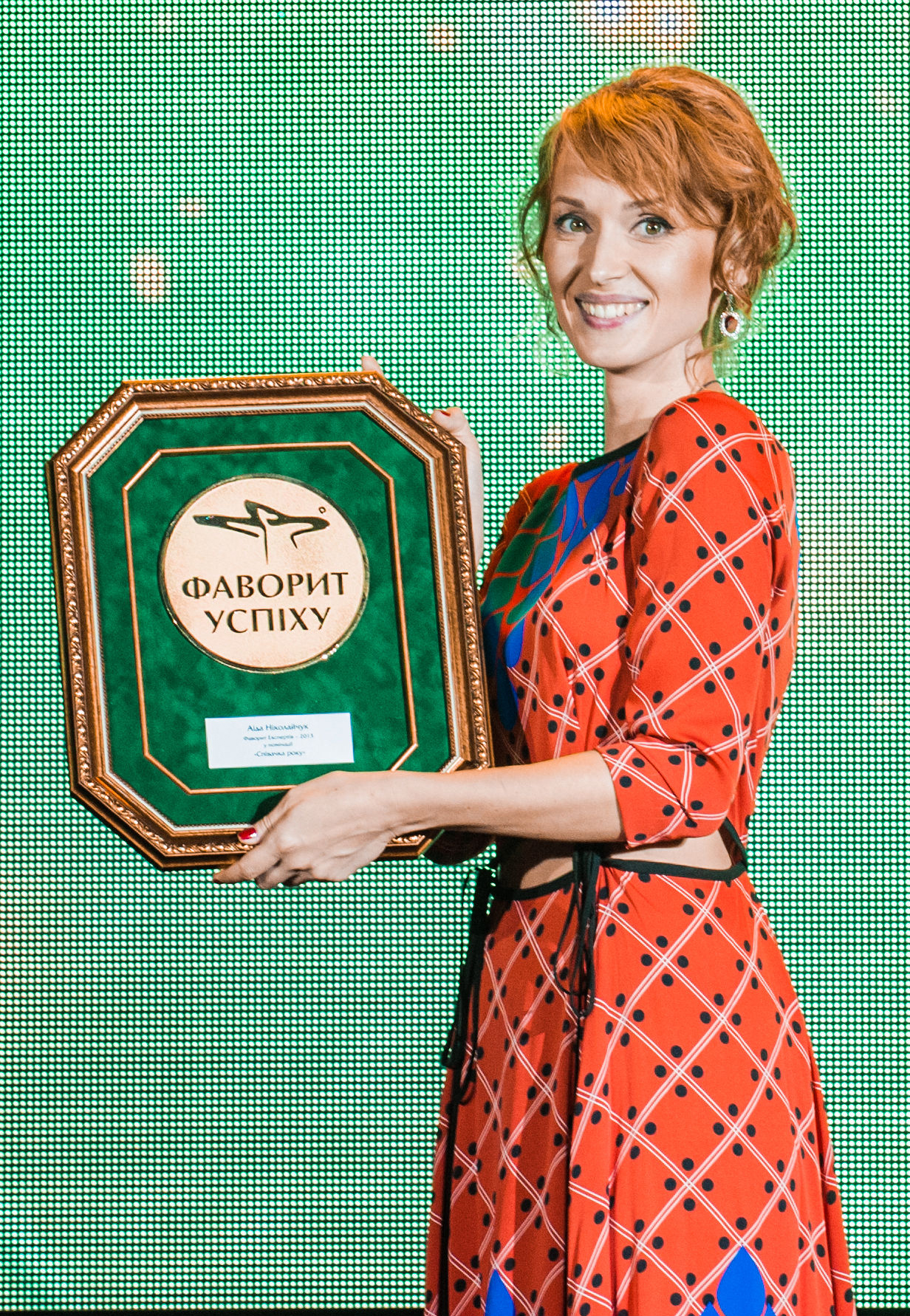

Background information
- Born: Aida Yuriivna Nikolaichuk; Odesa, Ukrainian SSR, Soviet Union
- Genres: Pop, pop rock, electronic
- Occupations: singer; actor
- Instrument: Vocals
- Years active: 2011–present

Aida Yuriivna Nikolaichuk (Ukrainian: Аіда Юріївна Ніколайчук), also romanised as Aida Nikolaychuk, is a Ukrainian pop singer and model, who was the winner of the third season of Ukraine's X-Factor TV talent competition in 2012.

She drew special attention during the show's second season when judges interrupted her performance of Polina Gagarina's Lullaby (Колыбельная, Kalybelnaya). She was suspected of lip-syncing to a recording, and was asked to sing a cappella. Although visibly surprised, Nikolaichuk sang the song equally well without accompaniment, wowing the judges and winning the votes of all four.

In 2013, she released her first single, "On Your Planet", which was included in her debut album We're Under One Sky.

== Early life ==
Nikolaichuk was born in Odesa, Ukrainian SSR, Soviet Union, to Iryna Leonidivna Munika (formerly Potolova) and computer specialist Yurii Yevheniiovych Titaiev. When she was ten, her parents got a divorce. She started singing in the first grade when she became the school choir soloist, later performing at school as a hip hop backup singer until 2002, as well as in her school choir in the fifth and eighth grades.

== Music career ==
=== 2011–2013: X-Factor and widespread attention ===
In 2011, Nikolaichuk quit her job as a cashier in order to participate in the casting for the second season of the Ukrainian television show X-Factor. After a unanimous decision by the show's judges to accept her, she proceeded to the training portion of the show.

After Nikolaichuk retired from X-Factor, the video of her performance at the casting show reached a record number of views on YouTube. Nikolaichuk then chose to participate in the second season of X-Factor Online. In November 2011, she was announced as a weekly winner of X-Factor Online, and on 31 December 2011, was announced as the winner of the X-Factor Online second season. The victory gained her entry to the training section of the show for the third season, bypassing the audition and pre-screening stages.

In 2012, Nikolaichuk was invited to perform in Moscow and Berlin. On 10 October 2012, she was interviewed by IMKA TV.

Participating in the third season of X-Factor, Nikolaichuk got to twenty-fourth place in the training section of the show in the age 25 and above category. Her category mentor was Igor Kondratyuk. Nikolaichuk then sang for the judges, including German singer Thomas Anders. After the visiting judge's performance, Nikolaichuk was placed in the top rankings for her category, and as one of the twelve top finalists. Also in her category were Eugene Litvinkovich and James Golovko. She then entered the direct elimination rounds, in which a contestant on the show is eliminated weekly by judges' vote. Nikolaichuk was never selected for elimination. On 22 December 2012, she participated in the final show. Her rivals were Aleksey Smirnov and Evgeny Litvinkovych. On 29 December 2012, she was chosen as a superfinalist, while Alexey Smirnov was eliminated from the show. On 5 January 2013, at the Gala concert, Nikolaichuk was announced as the winner of the third season of X-Factor.

On 6 March 2013, the news website Segodnya listed the most-viewed videos of Ukrainian female singers. Nikolaichuk's video received millions of views, and took 5th place.

In May 2013, Nikolaichuk visited Berlin. While there, she participated in photo shoots, and spoke at a restaurant, "Peterhof".

=== 2013–2014: My Pod Odnim Nebom ===
After winning the third season of X-Factor, Nikolaichuk started working with artists in the Commonwealth of Independent States (CIS) countries, and signed a contract with Sony Music. At the end of May 2013, she presented her debut single and music video, "On Your Planet", released 27 May. On 31 May 2013, she held her first solo concert in her hometown, Odessa.

On 8 June 2013, Nikolaichuk acted as a visiting judge for Mini-Miss Ukraine 2013.

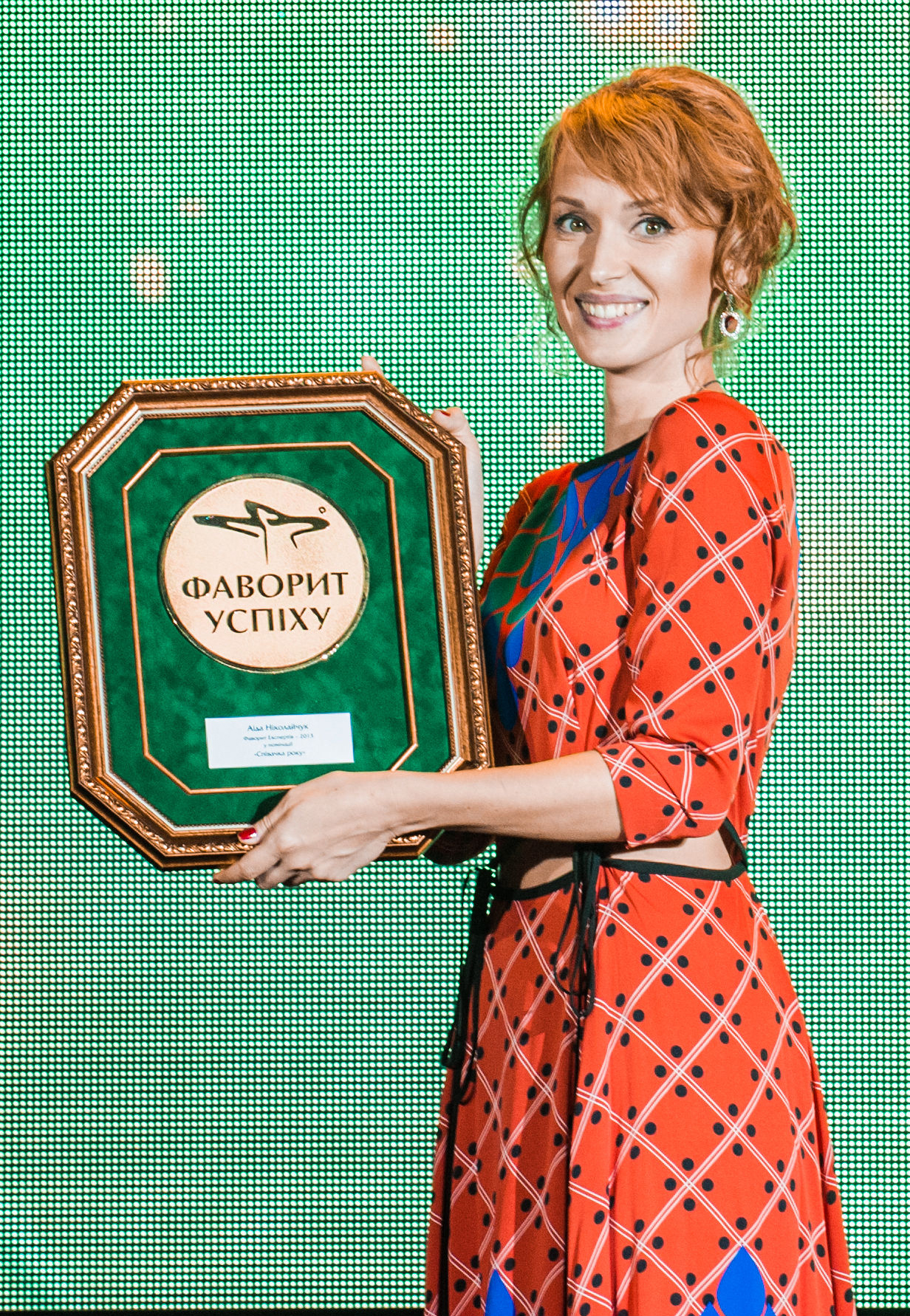
Aida Nikolaichuk — "Female singer of the Year" on the awarding ceremony of peoples rating «Favorites of Success – 2013»

Nikolaichuk currently performs in concerts and appearances in Ukraine.

On 4 September 2013, Nikolaichuk participated in the competition "Promotion", organized by the Russian television channel Music Box, presenting her debut video, and was selected as a winner.

On 4 October 2013, Nikolaichuk performed at Little Miss World 2013 in Bulgaria.

On 24 October 2013, she had her second solo concert in Dnipropetrovsk, and visited the local tabloid newspaper, "Komsomolskaya Pravda".

On 14 December 2013, the first Aida solo album, "My Pod Odnim Nebom", was released.

On 16 December 2013, the names of nominees for the annual music award YUNA-2013 were released; Aida was nominated for "Discovery of the Year".

In the results of the national poll «Favorites of Success – 2013», Aida was recognized as "Female Singer of the Year", thanks to the strong support of her fans.

=== 2015–2018: Looking for a new creative path ===
At the end of summer in 2014, the contract with Sony Music was canceled and then started to work with new team. On 29 September 2014, she released a new song called "Muzika", this marked as a new music era for Aida Nikolaichuk. On 2 December 2014, Aida was represented new song "Dva neba".

She was announced as a participant of the National Final to select the entrant for Ukraine in the Eurovision Song Contest 2016. Aida represented her single for selection called "Inner Power", that also has a Russian version called "Ver'".

Later that year, Aida represented new song "Ne trimay" and music video to this song was directed by Dmitriy Peretrutov.

In 2017, Aida came to Tokyo to participate in the Mozart-show competition for the second time. She performed the Japanese song "Sea of tears" and won the battle with famous Japanese singer Saya Asakura 朝倉さや. In the Final of the show, she was defeated with only basis point needed.

=== 2019–present: AIDA – new chapter ===
After a long career pause, on 4 September 2019 Aida released the single "Red Moon".

Aida Nikolaichuk is entering a new phase and takes new stage name – AIDA. She already started from new single called "Je T’aime J’adore", that has two versions (Ukrainian and English).

== Discography ==
=== Singles performed on X-Factor ===
Stage of the show	Song
Season 2: Casting	Polina Gagarina: "Lullaby"
Season 2: Fifth live broadcast	Yuliya Savicheva: "Highly"
Season 2: Gala Concert	Adele: "Rolling in the Deep"
Training camp	Whitney Houston: "I Wanna Run To You"
Performance for judges	Christina Aguilera: "You lost me"
First live broadcast	Barbra Streisand: "Woman in love"
Second live broadcast	Spice Girls: "Viva Forever"
Third live broadcast	Valentina Pomoreva: "Love Is A Fairyland" (from Cruel Romance)
Fourth live broadcast	Lauren Christy: "Color of the night"
Fifth live broadcast	Irina Bilyk: "Zironka"
Sixth live broadcast	Ani Lorak: "Ask My Heart"
Seventh live broadcast	ABBA: "Money, Money, Money"
Eighth live broadcast	Marilyn Monroe: "I Wanna Be Loved By You"
	Tina Karol: "Gently"
Ninth live broadcast	Kylie Minogue: "In Your Eyes"
	Lyudmila Senchina: "White Acacia"
Tenth live broadcast (final)	Polina Gagarina: "Lullaby"
	Chris Norman: "Stumblin' In" (Duet with Chris Norman)
	Lara Fabian: "Je suis malade"
Eleventh live broadcast (superfinal)	Marilyn Monroe: "I Wanna Be Loved By You"
	ABBA: "Money, Money, Money"
	Irina Bilyk: "Zironka"
	Pink: "Try"
	Polina Gagarina: "Lullaby"

=== Singles ===
Presentation	Song	Album
27 May 2013	Na tvoey planete (On your planet)	We're under one heaven
20 July 2013	My pod odnim nebom (We're under one heaven)	We're under one heaven
2 September 2013	Ne obeschay (Don't promise)	We're under one heaven
21 September 2013	Lyudi-mirazhi (People are mirages)	We're under one heaven
22 October 2013	Day mne noch' (Give me a night)	We're under one heaven
14 December 2013	U lyubvi moyey tvoi glaza (My love has your eyes)	My Pod Odnim Nebom
14 December 2013	Tak sumuê vesna (So sad spring)	My Pod Odnim Nebom
14 December 2013	Uletai (Fly Away) (Prince Igor opera)	My Pod Odnim Nebom
14 December 2013	We're Under One Heaven	My Pod Odnim Nebom

=== Music videos ===
- "Na tvoey planete" (2013)
- "Ne obeschay" (2013)
- "Korotkie Gudki" (2015)
