= Nino Katamadze =

Nino Katamadze ნინო ქათამაძე
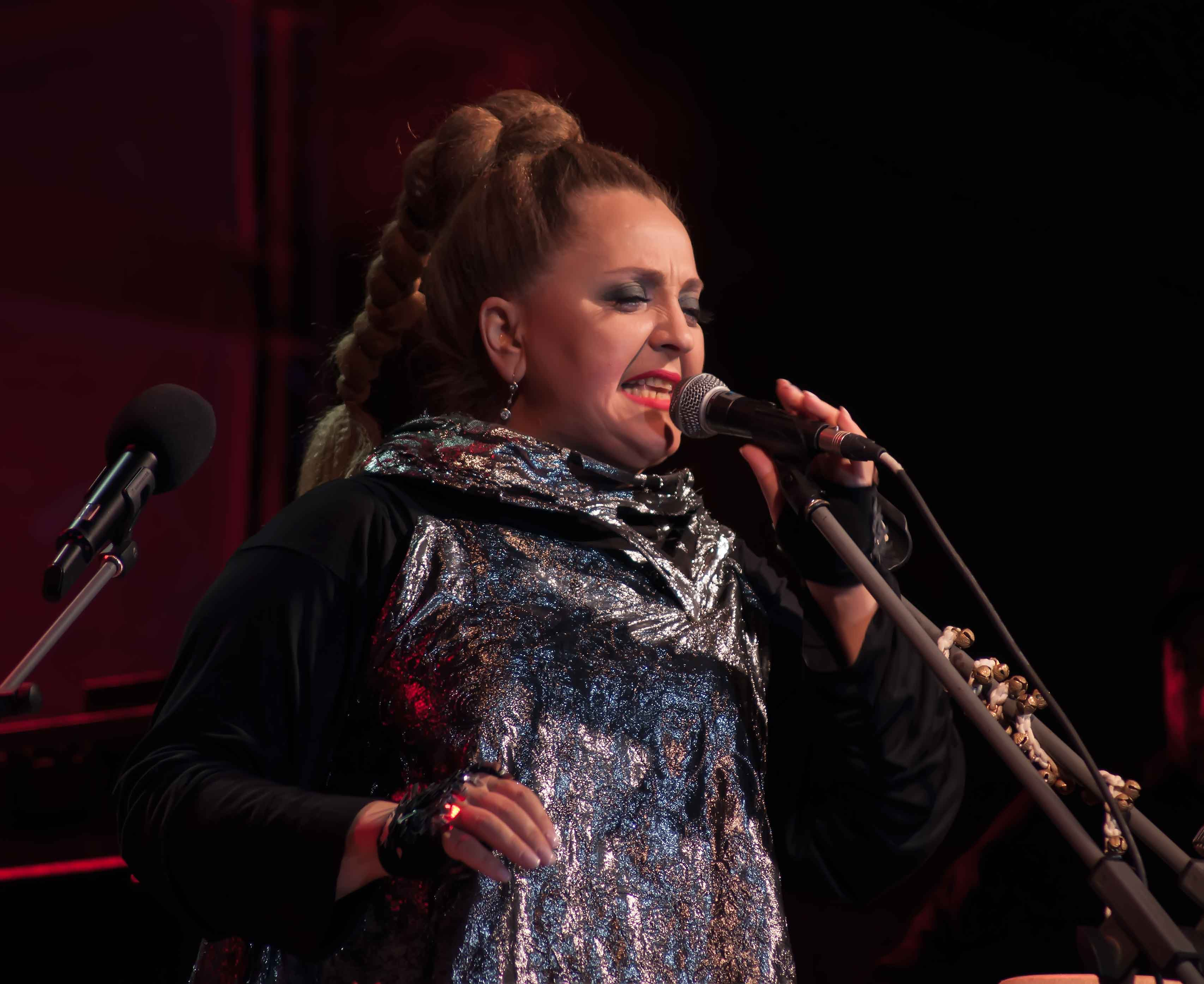

Background information
- Born: Nino Katamadze; 21 August 1972 (age 54); Kobuleti, Adjara ASSR, Georgian SSR, Soviet Union
- Origin: Georgian
- Genres: Jazz; World music; Psychedelic rock
- Occupations: Singer; songwriter; pianist
- Instruments: Vocals; piano
- Years active: 1992–present
- Label: Moon Records Ukraine
- Website: http://www.nino-katamadze.com

Nino Katamadze (Georgian: ნინო ქათამაძე; born 21 August 1972) is a Georgian jazz singer and artist.

== Biography ==
Nino Katamadze was born in Kobuleti, Adjara, Soviet Georgia in 1972. In 1990, she entered the vocal department of the Batumi Music Institute ZP Paliashvili. After finishing the Institute, she was in various groups and participated in a variety of musical projects. In 2002, Katamadze had her first international tour in different countries across Europe.

In 2006, her album "White" became very successful and was released in Georgia, Russia, Finland, Sweden, Ukraine, France, Germany, Italy and the UK. Sales exceeded 700,000 copies. In January 2010, she played a part in an improvised opera "Bobble" with a wordless libretto written by Bobby McFerrin and staged in Russia.

Following the 2019 Georgian protests, sparked by the visit of a Russian MP to the Georgian parliament, Katamadze announced on Facebook that she would no longer perform in Russia. Katamadze has actively participated in anti-government and pro-EU protests on Rustaveli Avenue in Tbilisi. She faced an unofficial ban on performing in Georgia under the ruling Georgian Dream party, with venues consistently cancelling or refusing to book her shows citing sudden renovations or technical reasons.

Following the beginning of Russo-Ukrainian war, Katamadze publicly supported Ukraine and continued performing in the country. In June 2022, she gave a concert at the Maidan Nezalezhnosti metro station in Kyiv for military personnel, volunteers and civilians. Katamadze publicly supported Ukraine and continued performing in the country. In June 2022, she gave a concert at the Maidan Nezalezhnosti metro station in Kyiv for military personnel, volunteers and civilians. In March 2022, she established the Nino Katamadze Foundation, which provided assistance to Ukrainian children who had taken refuge in Georgia. In 2023, Ukrainian president Volodymyr Zelenskyy awarded her the Order of Princess Olga for her contribution to supporting Ukraine's sovereignty and territorial integrity and for promoting the country internationally.. In August 2025, she and Georgian conductor Nikoloz Rachveli performed the Ukrainian song "Chornobryvtsi" at the annual National Legend of Ukraine award ceremony in Kyiv.

In September 2026, Katamadze announced the release of her first studio album in a decade, titled Lilat, scheduled for release on October 1, 2026.

== Discography ==
=== Albums ===
- Ordinary Day
- Nino Katamadze & Insight
- Start new peaceful day (Live DVD)
- White (2006)
- Black (2006)
- Blue (2008)
- Red (2010)
- Green (2011)
- Yellow (2016)
- Lilat (2026)

=== Soundtracks ===
- Mermaid (film, 2008)
- Heat (2006 film)
- Apple
- Orange Sky
- Road to the Savior
- Indi (2007)
- The Ghost (film, 2008)
