= Vladislav Kurasov =

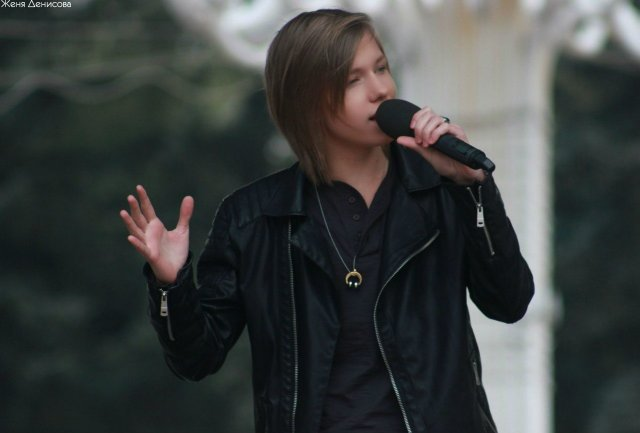
- Vladislav Kurasov, guest performer at The X-Factor 4 auditions in Kharkiv, Ukraine

Background information
- Also known as: Vlad Kurasov
- Born: Vladislav Kurasov; 13 March 1995 (age 31); Brest, Belarus
- Origin: Krasnodar, Russia
- Genres: Pop, dance-pop
- Occupations: Singer, songwriter
- Years active: 2011–present
- Website: vladislavkurasov.com

Vladislav Kurasov (Belarusian: Уладзіслаў Курасаў, romanized: Uladzislaw Kurasaw, Russian: Владислав Курасов, born 13 March 1995) is a Belarusian singer, songwriter, the finalist of the Ukrainian version of the television show The X-Factor, the winner of the television show Star Ring, The People's Voice Winner at the 2013 International Songwriting Competition, winner of the 2014 Unsigned Only Music Competition Fandemonium. He became a semifinalist in the Ukrainian National Selection for Eurovision Song Contest 2016, with "I'm Insane"

== Early years ==
Kurasov was born on 13 March 1995 in Brest, Belarus. He has two sisters and a brother and is the youngest in the family. In 2006, the Kurasov's family moved to Krasnodar, Russia. Vladislav enrolled in the Interschool Aesthetic Center (IAC) to study variety vocal singing and pianoforte, and theatre at the Creative Union "Première". He graduated his studies at these institutions in 2011 with honors. He is the winner of many national and international competitions, such as: "Blue-Eyed Anapa", "Star Youth of the Planet", "Little Stars", "Eaglet Lights Up a Star" and many others.

In 2007 Kurasov took part in Minuta slavy a show on the Russian "First Channel" performing Elvis Presley's song "Blue Suede Shoes" which received high scores from the jury.

== X Factor ==
On 27 August 2011 the STB broadcast a program about the Х-Factor auditions in Donetsk where Kurasov performed Celine Dion's song "My Heart Will Go On". The audience rose in applause and all four judges said "Yes" to Kurasov.

Having successfully passed the first three rounds of the selection process (preliminary and TV auditions and the training camp), Kurasov began competing in the fourth and deciding round for a place in the "Boys" category.

On 22 October 2011, in Х-Factor first live broadcast, Kurasov performed Leonard Cohen song "Hallelujah" which eventually became the "visiting card" of the young performer.

In week 7 he landed in the bottom two against Svitlana Vinnik but was saved by majority vote.

In the finale of the project he performed "Walking Away" in a duet with the British star Craig David. Kurasov finished third based on viewers voting.

Stage of the show	Song	Result
Season 2: Casting	Celine Dion: My Heart Will Go On	Advanced
Performance for judges	Mariah Carey: Without You	Advanced
First live broadcast	Leonard Cohen: Hallelujah	Safe
Second live broadcast	t.A.T.u.: "All About Us"	Safe
Third live broadcast	Alla Pugacheva and Boris Pasternak: "Svecha Gorela na Stole (The Candle Burned)"	Safe
Fourth live broadcast	Oleksandr Ponomaryov: "Varto Chi Ni"	Safe
Fifth live broadcast	Whitney Houston: I Will Always Love You	Safe
Sixth live broadcast	Cats: Memory	Safe
Seventh live broadcast	Iryna Bilyk: "Sneg"	Bottom two
Seventh live broadcast (Final Showdown)	Christina Aguilera: You Lost Me	Saved
Eighth live broadcast	Mark Minkov and Leonid Derbenev: "Ti Na Svete Yest"	Safe
	Beatles: Let It Be	Safe
Ninth live broadcast	Bravo: "Doroga v Oblaka"	Safe
	Yevgeniy Diatlov: "Nauchite Menya Ponimat Krasotu"	Safe
Tenth live broadcast (final)	Craig David: "Walking Away"	3rd Place
	Vladimir Vermenich and Mikola Singaivskiy: "Chornobrivtsi"	3rd Place
	Celine Dion: My Heart Will Go On	3rd Place
	Andrew Lloyd Webber and Dianne Warren: "It's My Time	3rd Place

== Star Ring ==
On 6 March 2012 the Ukrainian TV channel STB launched the show "Star Ring" which was a contest of finalists of two Х-Factor seasons and vocalists of Ukrayina maye talant. Kurasov was one of the contestants of that new project.

During the live broadcast of "Star Ring" on 10 April 2012, designated as the last broadcast of the show, and winner to be chosen by public voting, Kurasov performed "Hallelujah" from Leonard Cohen, his "visiting card", trying to impart new feelings to the song. Based on viewers’ voting he became was declared the winner and was awarded a cash prize of UAH 500,000 (equivalent to $61,550 USD) in addition to recording the song and releasing a music video.

== Music career ==
Kurasov's first authored song was "Farewell, My Town". It was released online on 22 June 2012 and was favorably received by his fans, getting good reviews.

On 2 December 2012, as a winner of the contest at the "Yatalant.ru", Kurasov presented his song "Proshchay, Moy Gorod" (Farewell, My Town) at "The Golden Gramophone Award" in St Petersburg, Russia. a yearly national Russian music award, established by Russian Radio in 1996 perfprming at the Ice Palace with a capacity of 11,000.

His second single "Nol Liubvi v Kvadrate" ("Zero Love Squared") became a semifinalist of The International Songwriting Competition in 2012 in Nashville, Tennessee in the Teen and Dance categories. Over 20,000 songs entered the competition from over 119 countries in all genres.

On 22 December 2012 Kurasov was an invitational guest at season three of the Ukrainian X Factor performing a new song "Shopot Dozhdey" ("Whisper of Rains"). On 26 February 2013 Kurasov released one more hit single "Zabudesh" ("You'll Forget") that was successfully played on Ukrainian radio stations, as well as in Germany and US stations, and other countries. On 18 June 2013 Kurasov released a music video for the song, filmed by renowned Ukrainian director and screenwriter Maxim Litvinov.

Vladislav Kurasov became a semifinalist of the international music competition Unsigned Only in 2013 held in Nashville, Tennessee in Teen category with his version of "Hallelujah" from Leonard Cohen.

On 13 September 2013 Kurasov presented his single "Day Mne Ispit" self-written and composed and a music video following on 8 October 2013 It became "The People's Voice" Winner at the 2013 International Songwriting Competitions, and got an Honorable mention in the Teen category. On 20 June 2014 it was selected for the Al Walser Top 20 Countdown Show. even though the song was in Russian.

"Day Mne Ispit" was followed on 7 April 2014 by the song "Ya Bolen Toboy" ("I'm Sick of You) again self-written and composed by Kurasov. With photographer Marina Khadzhinova, he produced a music video for his song that debuted on 18 September 2014 in a presentation in the Kyiv complex Indigo It was released by Moon Records

Another success in an international music competition in USA was when Kurasov won "Fandemonium" with the song "Hallelujah" in the "Vocal Performance" category in the 2014 Unsigned Only Music Competition. The competition attracted nearly 8000 entries from over 100 countries.

Kurasov performed has performed at numerous concerts including a successful acoustic concert with Zhenya Khmara on 29 November 2014 in Kyiv with part of proceeds going to charity.

Kurasov new single "My Love" also written by Kurasov was released on Moon Records and ITunes on 24 February 2015. Vladislav was an invitational guest in a Premier Russian Radio in Los Angeles.

On 22 January 2016 a video for his song "Na Glubine Dushi" was released. On 26 January 2016 Ukrainian TV Channels National Television Company of Ukraine (NTU) and STB announced that he was among the participants of that year's Ukrainian National selection of famous and talented Ukrainian singers for Eurovision 2016.

In October 2016 he released a single "Ne Smeysia Sudbe v Litso" that became a lead single of his first music album and music video with the famous music director Taras Golubkov and production of Icona Production at the StarPro music channel. On 25 November 2016 Vladislav Kurasov first album "Otrazhenie" was released on ITunes and GooglePlay.

== Singles ==
Presentation	Song	Author
22 June 2012	Proshchay Moy Gorod (Farewell My Town)	Vladislav Kurasov
20 October 2012	Nol Lyubvi v Kvadrate (Zero Love Squared)	Vladislav Kurasov
2 December 2012	Shopot Dozhdey (Whisper of Rains)	Music by Dmitry Danov, Lyrics by Gleb Kraskovsky
26 February 2013	Zabudesh (You'll Forget)	Vladimir Kurto
13 September 2013	Day Mne Ispit (Let Me Indulge)	Vladislav Kurasov
7 April 2014	Ya Bolen Toboy (I'm Sick of You)	Vladislav Kurasov
18 May 2014	18	Aleksey Malakhov
24 February 2015	My Love	Vladislav Kurasov
15 May 2015	Po Luzham	Elina Rashodova
9 November 2015	Na Glubine Dushi	Vladislav Kurasov
26 January 2016	I'm Insane	Music by Vladislav Kurasov, Lyrics by Natalia Rostova
13 October 2016	Ne Smeysia Sudbe v Litso	Elina Rashodova
25 November 2016	Follow the Play	Vladislav Kurasov
25 November 2016	VOODOO	Vladislav Kurasov
25 November 2016	Treugolnik	Vladislav Kurasov
25 November 2016	Lightness	Music by Vladislav Kurasov, Lyrics by Natalia Rostova
25 November 2016	Dnevniki	Vladislav Kurasov
25 November 2016	Hmari	Music by Vladislav Kurasov, Lyrics by Natalia Rostova
25 November 2016	Raznie	Elina Rashodova

=== Discography ===
* 25 November 2016— Otrazhenie

Song	Author
My Love	Vladislav Kurasov
Ne Smeysia Sudbe v Litso	Elina Rashodova.
Ya Bolen Toboy	Vladislav Kurasov
Ha Glubine Dushi	Vladislav Kurasov
I'm Insane	Vladislav Kurasov, Lyrics by Natalia Rostova
Follow the Play	Vladislav Kurasov
VOODOO	Vladislav Kurasov
Treugolnik	Vladislav Kurasov
Lightness	Music by Vladislav Kurasov, Lyrics by Natalia Rostova
Po Luzham	Elina Rashodova
Dnevniki	Vladislav Kurasov
Hmari	Music by Vladislav Kurasov, Lyrics by Natalia Rostova
Raznie	Elina Rashodova

== Videos ==
Presentation	Video
18 June 2013	Zabudesh (You'll Forget)
8 October 2013	Day Mne Ispit (Let Me Indulge)
22 September 2014	Ya Bolen Toboy
22 January 2016	Na Glubine Dushi
28 October 2016	Ne Smeysia Sydbe v Litso

== Solo Concerts ==
Date	City	Venue	Featured
5 May 2012	Luhansk, Ukraine	Concert Hall " Colloseum"	
19 May 2012	Poltava, Ukraine	Nightclub "Chocolate"	
26 May 2012	Odesa, Ukraine	Night club "Nota Bene"	
9 June 2012	Kyiv, Ukraine	Night club "Manilov"	
15 September 2012	Donetsk, Ukraine	"Chicago Music Hall"	
22 September 2012	Kharkiv, Ukraine	Night club "Jackson"	
6 October 2012	Odesa, Ukraine	Night club "Nota Bene"	
20 October 2012	Kyiv, Ukraine	Concert Hall "Byblos"	
17 November 2012	St Petersburg, Russia	Night club "My Bay"	
1 December 2012	Moscow, Russia	Night Club FM CLUB	
25 May 2013	Luhansk, Ukraine	Concert Hall " Colloseum"	
17 May 2014	Kyiv, Ukraine	B-52	Rihter
23 August 2014	Kyiv, Ukraine	Club "D*Lux"	Vyacheslav Yefremov, Dmitriy Masyuchenko
27 September 2014	Mykolaiv, Ukraine	"Metallurg"	
1 November 2014	Kharkiv, Ukraine	Night Club "Jackson"	
29 November 2014	Kyiv, Ukraine	House of Architect	Yevgeniy Khmara
14 March 2015	Odesa, Ukraine	Club "Atlantic"	
17 May 2015	Kyiv, Ukraine	Karusel Club	
7 November 2015	Kyiv Ukraine	European University	
26 November 2016	Kyiv, Ukraine	Night Club SkyBar	GINGER cover band

== Guest appearances ==
Year	Title	Role	Notes
12 September 2012	Master Chef	Himself	TV series Channel STB (2 episode. Post-Show);
9 September 2012	Guten Morgen	Himself	TV Channel M-1;
22 November 2012	Rankove Expresso	Himself	TV Channel TONIS;
2 December 2012	The Golden Gramophone Award	Performer	St Petersburg, Russia
12 December 2012	XFactor-3 Ukraine	Performer	TV series Channel STB, 9 Live Show
2 April 2013	Guten Morgen	Himself	TV Channel M-1;
2 April 2013	Neymovirna Pravda pro Zirok	Himself	TV Channel STB;
12 April 2013	Holostiak (Bachelor)	Performer	TV Channel STB, Post-Show;
14 May 2013	SHOW-STARS	himself	TV Channel in Odesa
9 June 2013	Nashchadki	Performer	TV Channel First National
26 June 2013	Neymovirna Pravda Pro Zirok	himself	TV Channel STB
2 July 2013	Vladislav Kurasov at Celebration of Youth Day	himself	TV Channel TPK Aleks Zaporizhzhia
14 August 2013	SHOW-STARS	himself	TV Channel in Odesa
15 August 2013	Nehay Nam Bude Colyorovo	himself	TV Channel First National
24 September 2013	Story of creating Vladislav Kurasov's video	himself	TV Channel M-1
26 September 2013	Story of creating Vladislav Kurasov's video	himself	TV Channel ICTV "Korisni Novini"
27 September 2013	Story of creating Vladislav Kurasov's video	himself	TV Channel Noviy Channel (New Channel)"Pidiom"
2 October 2013	Neymovirna Pravda pro Zirok	himself	TV Channel STB
9 October 2013	Music Box Daily News	himself	TV Channel Music Box UA
18 October 2013	Zvazheni i Schastlivi (Biggest Looser)	Performer	TV Channel STB, Post-Show
21 October 2013	Neymovirna Pravda pro Zirok	himself	TV Channel STB
5 April 2014	Interview with Vladislav Kurasov	himself	TV Channel 112 Ukraine HD
5 April 2014	Chas Sovi	himself	TV Channel -Central Channel Ukraine
11 April 2014	Rankovi Kurasani	himself/performer	TVi Channel
15 July 2014	Teleacademiya	performer	TV Channel-First National
29 May 2014	Idu na Ti	himself	TV-5, Zaporizhzhia
11 August 2014	Detskiye Mudrosti	himself	TV Channel Humor TV
3 November 2014	Vse Bude Dobre	Performer	TV Channel STB
24 February 2015	Interview With Vladislav Kurasov	himself, performer	Premier Russian Radio, Los Angeles, USA

== Awards and nominations ==
- 2011 Finalist of the TV Show The X-Factor-2 Ukraine,
- 2012 The Winner of the TV Show "Star Ring"
- 2013 Ukraine "Favorite of Success" Award Gold Winner in a Young Talent category
- 2013 International Songwriting Competitions "The People's Voice" Winner and the Honorable mention in the category Teen with his single "Day Mne Ispit" on 6 May 2014.
- 2014 Unsigned Only Music Competition Fandemonium Winner with the song "Hallelujah" (Leonard Cohen cover), Finalist in the "Vocal Performance" category
- 2015 Beat100 #1 Charting Video Award for "Ya Bolen Toboy" Original Video for the week of 16 February 2015 (won)
- 2015 Beat100 Gold Song A&R Award, Gold Video A&R Award & Silver Most Watched Video Award for "Ya Bolen Toboy" Original Video
- 2015 Beat100 Audio Chart #1 Award from the week of 29 May 2015 for song "Po Luzham" (won)
- 2016 the semifinalist of the Ukrainian National Selection for Eurovision Song Contest -2016

== See also ==
- X-Factor (Ukraine)
- Ukraine in the Eurovision Song Contest 2016
