= Seryoga =

Belarusian rapper

Seryoga Серёга
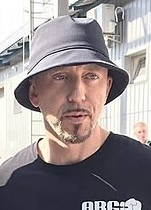

Background information
- Also known as: Ayvengo, Poligraf SharikOFF
- Born: Sergey Vasilyevich Parkhomenko; October 8, 1976 (age 50); Gomel, Byelorussian SSR, Soviet Union
- Genres: Hip hop, rap rock, rapcore, nu metal
- Occupations: Rapper, record producer, actor
- Instruments: rapping, singing
- Years active: 2002–present
- Label: KingRing
- Website: seryogamusic.ru/

Sergey Vasilyevich Parkhomenko (Russian: Сергей Васильевич Пархоменко, Belarusian: Сяргей Васільевіч Пархоменка, romanized: Syarhyey Vasilyevich Parkhomyenka; born October 8, 1976), known professionally as Seryoga (Russian: Серёга), is a Belarusian rapper and the owner of the KingRing record label.

== Career ==
Parkhomenko was born in Gomel, Belarus. The moniker "Seryoga" derives from his first name, Sergey, and is one of the nickname forms commonly used for that name.

Seryoga released his first solo single "Загубили Лялю" (Ruined Laila) in the summer of 2002. In 2003, the record label "Монолит" (Monolit) released the CD Maxi single of "Загубили Лялю" with 5 tracks in Russia and Belarus.

In February 2004, Seryoga started a show on the Ukrainian music channel М-1. In April 2004, the record label MFG/BMG Ukraine released Seryoga's debut solo album "Мой двор: свадьбы & похороны" (My neighborhood: weddings & funerals) in Ukraine. The album was simultaneously released in the Belarus by the record label Go Records. The album came out several weeks later in Russia, where it was titled "Мой двор. Спортивные частушки" (My neighborhood. Sports chastushki).

His third single was "Чёрный Бумер" (Chyorniy Bumer, meaning Black Bimmer). The "Чёрный Бумер" music video was shot in the summer of 2004 by Ukrainian director Vladimir Yakimenko (Pistolet Film) and premiered on September 15, 2004, in Kyiv, Ukraine. In 2005, the music video for the song "King Ring" was shot in Kyiv. The song was written for the feature film "Shadowboxing" and included on its soundtrack. In 2006, the film Day Watch came out in theaters, the sequel to Night Watch from two years earlier. The film's soundtrack featured Seryoga's song "Мел судьбы или Песня Тамерлана" (Mel sudby ili Pesnya Tamerlana, English: "Chalk of Destiny or Timur's song") as the theme song.

In Germany, Seryoga collaborated on the song "2 Kaiser" with the German rapper Azad. Seryoga then worked with the German rapper Megaloh and also recorded the song "In Da City" with German rap group Culcha Candela. Seryoga's song King Ring was chosen by Rockstar Games to be the background music of the Third Trailer for their video game Grand Theft Auto IV, titled Move up, Ladies and is also featured in the game on its "Vladivostok FM" radio station. He was also contracted to compose a track for The Music of Grand Theft Auto IV (the music CD included with the special edition of GTA IV) entitled Liberty City: The Invasion, which is also featured on the in-game radio station.

== Political position ==
In 2021, Seryoga has publicly declared his support to the president of Belarus, Alexander Lukashenka, whom he described as “the keeper of the [political] balance [in Belarus]”.

Despite a large number of documented human rights abuses in Belarus in 2020–21, Seryoga describes the place as "peaceful and orderly", with "infrastructure that works" and "a large number of people with happy faces". In response to the reaction of the network, Parkhomenko called himself a Russian "statesman", and Stalin a "great humanist".

In September 2022, he promoted the ideology of one nation opposed by the West on TV. He also denied the validity of the collapse of the USSR.

== Discography ==
=== Studio albums ===
- 2004 – Moy Dvor
  - Moy Dvor: Svad'by i pokhoriny (Ukraine and Belarus) (2004)
  - Moy Dvor: Sportivnye chastushki (Russia) (2004)

Track list:

1. Govorila mama vecherom synochku (Momma told the son at night)
2. Kukla (Doll) – feat. Max Lorens
3. Ryzhy (Red-Head)
4. Pesenka o slesare shestogo razryada
5. Gimn boleyshikov FC "Spartak"
6. Suka-iuda
7. Vykhodila Manya zamuzh (Manya Got Married)
8. A na tantspole netu svobodnykh mest (There's no space on the dancefloor)
9. Chorniy Bumer (Black Beamer)
10. Deti Moskvy (Kids Of Moscow)
11. Голуби (Doves) – feat. Satsura
12. Zagubili lyalyu
- 2005 – Дискомалярия (Discomaliaria)
  - Дискомалярия (standard edition) (2005)
  - Дискомалярия (deluxe edition) (2005)
  - Дискомалярия: Большая порция (2006)
  - $1000000: Самая Большая Порция (collectors edition) (2007)

Track list:

1. Intro
2. 2 Kaiser (feat. Azad)
3. Barbeque
4. Gangsta No More
5. Mr. Perfect (feat. Rapturous)
6. Disco Malaria (feat. Eveleena)
7. Old Schooler (feat. Sacura)
8. I'm In Love With A Russian Boy
9. Mon Beat (feat. Skuril)
10. Disco Malaria (Russian Version)
11. Superbotanic full track
12. Kukla full track
13. Gangsta Rap (feat. Eveleena)
14. Kepka (A Tribute to Kangol 504)
15. King Ring
- 2007 – Не для продажи (Ne Dlya Prodazhi) (Russian: Not for sale, as Ayvengo)
- 2008 – Хроника парнишки с гомельских улиц (Khronika Parnishki S Gomel'skikh Ulits) (Russian: The Chronicles of a Kid From the Streets of Gomel)

Track list:

1. Sidi i slushay (Sit And Listen)
2. Skit ot Khaby Kazanskogo (Skit from Haba Kazansky)
3. Parnishka s ulitsy (Guy From Streets)
4. Dobav' skorost' (Add The Speed)
5. Moyo pokoleniye (My Generation) – feat. Satsura
6. Mne s toboyu khorosho (It's Good With You)
7. Show dolzhno prodolzat'sya (The Show Must Go On)
8. Quasimodo Skit
9. Quasimodo – feat. Satsura
10. Korabli (Ships)
11. Mon Ami – feat. Max Lorens
12. Vtorzheniye (The Invansion) (GTA IV soundtrack)
13. Vyshe neba tol'ko nebo (Sky is the limit) – feat. Aleksandr Marshal
14. Igra (Game)
15. Chiki (Chicks)
16. Olya i SPID (Olya & AIDS) – feat. Vladimir Zhirinovsky / China-town (hidden track)

=== Compilations ===
- 2005 – А на танцполе нет свободных мест (remix album)
- 2006 – Russia's No.1
- 2008 – The Best of Seryoga

=== Singles ===
- 2003 – Загубили Лялю
- 2004 – Чёрный бумер
- 2005 – Возле дома твоегo feat. Макс Лоренс & Сацура
- 2005 – Дискомалярия
- 2005 – KING RING
- 2005 – Barbeque
- 2005 – Diskomalaria VLS
- 2006 – 2 Kaiser (feat. Azad)
- 2007 – Летняя песня feat.Макс Лоренс
- 2007 – Рэп vs. СПИД (feat. Владимир Жириновский)
- 2007 – $1000000
- 2007 – Я рэп feat. St1m
- 2007 – Gangsta No More CDS
- 2007 – Gangsta No More VLS
- 2008 – Мне с тобою хорошо
- 2008 – Шоу Должно Продолжаться (Музыка Queen – Show must go on) (гимн телешоу «Король Ринга–2» на Первом канале).
- 2008 – Про Модных Девчонок (Г. П. Т. R’N’B) (feat. «Подиум»)
- 2008 – Liberty City. The Invasion (OST GTA IV)
- 2008 – Чики
- 2008 – Твой город не спит (DJ Shevtsov & DJ Miller ft. Макс Лоренс)
- 2009 – Тектоник
- 2009 – Выше неба feat. РИ
- 2009 – Кружим
- 2009 – Кружим 2
- 2009 – К Элизе feat.ПМ
- 2010 – С новым годом,СНГ! feat.Маша Малиновская
- 2010 – Иваново
- 2011 – Осколки
- 2013 – Tuman
- 2013 – Lubliuy

== Videos ==
- 2003 – Загубили Лялю
- 2003 – Кукла
- 2004 – Чёрный Бумер
- 2004 – Песенка о слесаре шестого разряда
- 2004 – Бум! (TT-34 featuring Seryoga)
- 2005 – King Ring
- 2005 – Дискомалярия
- 2005 – Возле дома твоего
- 2005 – $1000000
- 2006 – Мел судьбы
- 2006 – 2 Kaiser (featuring Azad)
- 2007 – RAP vs. СПИД (featuring ВВЖ)
- 2007 – Ein Teil von Mir (Sido featuring Seryoga & B-Tight)
- 2007 – Я – рэп (featuring St1m)
- 2007 – Gangsta No More
- 2007 – Отчего (Ri featuring Seryoga)
- 2007 – Аггробабруйск
- 2007 – Про модных девчёнок и не модных ребят (featuring Podium)
- 2008 – Позови меня (featuring Alexa)
- 2008 – Шоу должно продолжаться
- 2008 – Liberty City: The Invasion
- 2008 – Чики
- 2009 – Кружим
- 2009 – К Элизе (feat. ПМ)
- 2009 – C Новым годом, СНГ! (feat. Маша Малиновская)
- 2009 – Холодно (feat. Ri)
- 2009 – Корабли
