= X Factor (Ukrainian TV series) series 9 =

X Factor
- Series 9
- Hosted by: Andrey Bednyakov
- Judges: Oleg Vinnik; Anastasia Kamenskykh; Dmytro Shurov; Andriy Danylko
- Winner: ZBSband
- Winning mentor: Anastasia Kamenskykh
- Runner-up: Dmytro Volkanov

Release
- Original network: STB
- Original release: 1 September – 29 December 2018

Series chronology
- ← Previous; Series 8

X Factor is a Ukrainian television music competition to find new singing talent and part of a British franchise The X Factor. The ninth series began on 1 September 2018 and concluded on 29 December 2018. The judging panel remained the same from last series of Oleg Vinnik, Anastasia Kamenskykh, Dmytro Shurov and Andriy Danylko. Andrey Bednyakov returned as presenter of the main show on STB.

ZBSband won the competition and for the first time on the Ukrainian version of the x factor a group won the show and Anastasia Kamenskykh became the winning for the first time.

== Selection process ==
=== Finalists ===
– Winner
– Runner-up
– Third place

Mentor	Acts			
Boys (Danylko)	Ivan Ishchenko	Oleksandr Ilykha	Petro Harasymiv	Dmytro Volkanov
Girls (Vinnik)	Palina	Olha Zhmurina	Margaryta Dvoynenko	
Over 30s (Shurov)	Mark Savin	Olha Tsepkalo	Oleksandr Ryabenko	
Groups (Kamenskykh)	Duke Time	Jazzforacat	ZBSband	

== Live Shows ==
=== Results summary ===
Colour key

–	Contestant was in the bottom two/three and had to perform again in the sing-off
–	Contestant received the fewest public votes and was immediately eliminated (no final showdown)
–	Contestant received the most public votes

Contestant	Week 1	Week 2	Week 3	Week 4	Week 5	Week 6
ZBSband	Safe	Safe	Safe	Safe	Safe	Winner
Dmytro Volkanov	Safe	Safe	Safe	Safe	Safe	Runner-up
Mark Savin	Safe	Safe	Safe	Safe	3rd	Eliminated (week 5)
Olha Zhmurina	Safe	Safe	Bottom three	Bottom three	4th	Eliminated (week 5)
Duke Time	Safe	Safe	Safe	Bottom three	Eliminated (week 4)	
Petro Harasymiv	Safe	Safe	Safe	Bottom three	Eliminated (week 4)	
Palina	Safe	Safe	Bottom three	Eliminated (week 3)		
Ivan Ishchenko	Safe	Safe	Bottom three	Eliminated (week 3)		
Jazzforacat	Safe	Bottom three	Eliminated (week 2)			
Margaryta Dvoynenko	Safe	Bottom three	Eliminated (week 2)			
Olha Tsepkalo	Bottom three	Bottom three	Eliminated (week 2)			
Oleksandr Ilykha	Bottom three	Eliminated (week 1)				
Oleksandr Ryabenko	Bottom three	Eliminated (week 1)				
Bottom three	Oleksandr Ilykha, Oleksandr Ryabenko, Olha Tsepkalo	Jazzforacat, Margaryta Dvoynenko, Olha Tsepkalo	Ivan Ishchenko, Olha Zhmurina, Palina	Duke Time, Olha Zhmurina, Petro Harasymiv	The act that received the fewest public votes was automatically eliminated.	
Judges voted to:	Save				The act that received the fewest public votes was automatically eliminated.	
Shurov's vote to save:	Olha Tsepkalo	Olha Tsepkalo	Palina	Olha Zhmurina	The act that received the fewest public votes was automatically eliminated.	
Vinnik's vote to save:	Olha Tsepkalo	Margaryta Dvoynenko	Olha Zhmurina	Olha Zhmurina	The act that received the fewest public votes was automatically eliminated.	
Danylko's vote to save:	Oleksandr Ilykha	–	Ivan Ishchenko	Petro Harasymiv	The act that received the fewest public votes was automatically eliminated.	
Kamenskykh's vote to save:	Olha Tsepkalo	Jazzforacat	Olha Zhmurina	Duke Time	The act that received the fewest public votes was automatically eliminated.	
Eliminated	Oleksandr Ilykha; 1 of 4 votes to save Minority	Jazzforacat; 1 of 4 votes to save Minority	Palina; 1 of 4 votes to save Minority	Duke Time; 1 of 4 votes to save Minority	Mark Savin; Fewest votes to save	Dmytro Volkanov; Fewest votes to win
Eliminated	Oleksandr Ilykha; 1 of 4 votes to save Minority	Olha Tsepkalo; 1 of 4 votes to save Minority	Palina; 1 of 4 votes to save Minority	Duke Time; 1 of 4 votes to save Minority	Mark Savin; Fewest votes to save	Dmytro Volkanov; Fewest votes to win
Eliminated	Oleksandr Ryabenko; 0 of 4 votes to save Minority	Margaryta Dvoynenko; 1 of 4 votes to save Minority	Ivan Ishchenko; 1 of 4 votes to save Minority	Petro Harasymiv; 1 of 4 votes to save Minority	Olha Zhmurina; Fewest votes to save	Dmytro Volkanov; Fewest votes to win

=== Live show details ===
==== Week 1 (24 November) ====
Contestants' performances on the first live show
Act	Order	Song	Result
Olha Zhmurina	1	"Шкода"	Safe
Petro Harasymiv	2	"Очі на піску"	Safe
Olha Tsepkalo	3	"Журавлі"	Bottom three
Jazzforacat	4	"Вахтерам"	Safe
Mark Savin	5	"Whatever It Takes"	Safe
Ivan Ishchenko	6	"Де би я"	Safe
Dmytro Volkanov	7	"Une vie d'amour"	Safe
Margaryta Dvoynenko	8	"Плакала"	Safe
Oleksandr Ryabenko	9	"Дождь осенний"	Bottom three
ZBSband	10	"Ресницы"	Safe
Oleksandr Ilykha	11	"Secret"	Bottom three
Palina	12	"Тримай"	Safe
Duke Time	13	"Apologize"	Safe
Final showdown details
Oleksandr Ryabenko	1	"О любви немало песен сложено"	Eliminated
Oleksandr Ilykha	2	"Helter Skelter"	Eliminated
Olha Tsepkalo	3	"Turn Around"	Saved

==== Week 2 (1 December) ====
Contestants' performances on the second live show
Act	Order	Song	Result
Dmytro Volkanov	1	"Тополиный Пух"	Safe
Palina	2	"Ариведерчи"	Safe
Duke Time	3	"Самба белого мотылька"	Safe
Ivan Ishchenko	4	"Careless Whisper"	Safe
Olha Tsepkalo	5	"Ney Na Na Na"	Bottom three
Jazzforacat	6	"Полковнику никто не пишет"	Bottom three
ZBSband	7	"Он тебя целует"	Safe
Olha Zhmurina	8	"Be My Lover"	Safe
Mark Savin	9	"Февраль"	Safe
Margaryta Dvoynenko	10	"Ночной Мотылек"	Bottom three
Petro Harasymiv	11	"Піду втоплюся"	Safe
Final showdown details
Olha Tsepkalo	1	"Sweet Child O' Mine"	Eliminated
Margaryta Dvoynenko	2	"Стена"	Eliminated
Jazzforacat	3	"Кораблі"	Eliminated

==== Week 3 (8 December) ====
Contestants' performances on the third live show
Act	Order	Song	Result
Ivan Ishchenko	1	"Happy"	Bottom three
Olha Zhmurina	2	"Останусь"	Bottom three
Petro Harasymiv	3	"Чито-Грито"	Safe
Dmytro Volkanov	4	"Jamaica"	Safe
Palina	5	"Около тебя"	Bottom three
ZBSband	6	"CrazyMFlove"	Safe
Duke Time	7	"Bohemian Rhapsody"	Safe
Mark Savin	8	"Танцы на стеклах"	Safe
Final showdown details
Palina	1	"Як ты"	Eliminated
Ivan Ishchenko	2	"О любвы"	Eliminated
Olha Zhmurina	3	"Highway to Hell"	Saved

==== Week 4 (15 December) ====
Contestants' performances on the fourth live show
Act	Order	First song	Order	Second song	Result
Duke Time	1	"Цвет настроения синий"	7	"Осколки лета"	Bottom three
Dmytro Volkanov	2	"Біла голубка"	8	"Livin' la Vida Loca"	Safe
ZBSband	3	"Будь, що буде"	9	"Пацик хоче у Львов"	Safe
Olha Zhmurina	4	"Don't Speak"	10	"After Dark"	Bottom three
Petro Harasymiv	5	"А липи цвітуть"	11	"Любов останньою ніколи не буває"	Bottom three
Mark Savin	6	"Квіти у волоссі"	12	"Я тебя люблю"	Safe
Final showdown details
Act		Order		Song	Result
Petro Harasymiv		1		"Материнська любов"	Eliminated
Olha Zhmurina		2		"Неизвестно"	Saved
Duke Time		3		"The Final Countdown"	Eliminated

==== Week 5 Semi-final (22 December) ====
Contestants' performances on the fifth live show
Act	Order	First Song	Order	Second Song	Order	Third Song	Result
Dmytro Volkanov	1	"Historia de un amor"	5	"Зибен-Зибен, Ай-Лю-Лю" (With Andriy Danylko)	9	"Голуби"	Safe
ZBSband	2	"На морозі"	6	"Важно" (With Monatik)	10	"Тралики"	Safe
Olha Zhmurina	3	"Whole Lotta Love"	7	"Viva Forever" (With Melanie C)	11	"О нём"	Eliminated
Mark Savin	4	"Iron Sky"	8	"Too Close" (With Alex Clare)	12	"Бегу по небу"	Eliminated

==== Week 6 Final (29 December) ====
Contestants' performances on the sixth live show
Act	Order	First Song	Order	Second Song	Result
ZBSband	1	"Пацик хоче у Львов"	3	"Птицы"	Winner
Dmytro Volkanov	2	"Тополиный Пух"	4	"Ну что же ты"	Runner-up
