= X Factor (Ukrainian TV series) series 8 =

X Factor
- Series 8
- Hosted by: Andrey Bednyakov
- Judges: Oleg Vinnik; Nastya Kamenskykh; Dmitry Shurov; Andriy Danylko
- Winner: Misha Panchishyn
- Winning mentor: Dmitry Shurov
- Runner-up: Yurcash

Release
- Original network: STB
- Original release: 2 September – 30 December 2017

Series chronology
- Next → Series 9

X Factor is a Ukrainian television music competition to find new singing talent and part of a British franchise The X Factor. The eight series began on 2 September 2017 and will conclude on 30 December 2017. The judging panel consists of Oleg Vinnik, Nastya Kamenskykh, Dmitry Shurov and Andriy Danylko. Andrey Bednyakov returned as presenter of the main show on STB.

== Selection process ==
=== Finalists ===
– Winner
– Runner-up
– Third Place

| Mentor | Acts | | |
|---|---|---|---|
| Boys (Shurov) | Ivan Varava | Misha Panchishyn | Ostap Skorokhod |
| Girls (Kamenskykh) | Dasha Stupak | Anya Trubetskaya | Kseniya Popova |
| Over 30s (Vinnik) | Mykola Ilyin | Olena Romanovska | Olena Zuyeva |
| Groups (Danylko) | Kablukami po bruschatke | Yurcash | Kazka |

== Live shows ==
=== Results summary ===
Colour key

| – | Contestant was in the bottom two/three and had to perform again in the sing-off |
| – | Contestant was in the bottom three but received the fewest votes and was immediately eliminated |
| – | Contestant received the fewest public votes and was immediately eliminated (no final showdown) |
| – | Contestant received the most public votes |

| Contestant | Week 1 | Week 2 | Week 3 | Week 4 | Week 5 | Week 6 | Week 7 | Week 8 |
|---|---|---|---|---|---|---|---|---|
| Misha Panchishyn | Safe | Safe | Safe | Safe | Safe | Safe | Safe | Winner |
| Yurcash | Safe | Safe | Safe | Safe | Safe | Safe | Safe | Runner-up |
| Dasha Stupak | Safe | Safe | Safe | Safe | Safe | Bottom three | 3rd | Eliminated |
| Olena Zuyeva | Safe | Safe | Safe | Safe | Safe | Bottom three | Eliminated (week 6) | |
| Kablukami po bruschatke | Safe | Safe | Safe | Safe | Bottom three | 5th | Eliminated (week 6) | |
| Mykola Ilyin | Safe | Safe | Safe | Safe | Bottom three | Eliminated (week 5) | | |
| KAZKA | Safe | Safe | Safe | Bottom three | 7th | Eliminated (week 5) | | |
| Anya Trubetskaya | Safe | Safe | Bottom two | Bottom three | Eliminated (week 4) | | | |
| Olena Romanovska | Safe | 10th | Safe | 9th | Eliminated (week 4) | | | |
| Ivan Varava | Safe | Safe | Bottom two | Eliminated (week 3) | | | | |
| Ostap Skorokhod | 11th | 11th | Eliminated (week 2) | | | | | |
| Kseniya Popova | 12th | Eliminated (week 1) | | | | | | |
| Bottom two | Ostap Skorokhod, Kseniya Popova | Olena Romanovska, Ostap Skorokhod | Ivan Varava, Anya Trubetskaya | Anya Trubetskaya, KAZKA | Mykola Ilyin, Kablukami po bruschatke | Dasha Stupak, Olena Zuyeva | The act that received the fewest public votes was automatically eliminated. | |
| Judges voted to eliminate: | Eliminate | | | | | | The act that received the fewest public votes was automatically eliminated. | |
| Shurov's vote to eliminate: | Kseniya Popova | Olena Romanovska | Anya Trubetskaya | Anya Trubetskaya | Mykola Ilyin | Olena Zuyeva | The act that received the fewest public votes was automatically eliminated. | |
| Vinnik's vote to eliminate: | Kseniya Popova | Ostap Skorokhod | Ivan Varava | Anya Trubetskaya | Kablukami po bruschatke | Dasha Stupak | The act that received the fewest public votes was automatically eliminated. | |
| Danylko's vote to eliminate: | Ostap Skorokhod | Olena Romanovska | Ivan Varava | Anya Trubetskaya | Mykola Ilyin | Olena Zuyeva | The act that received the fewest public votes was automatically eliminated. | |
| Kamenskykh's vote to eliminate: | Ostap Skorokhod | Ostap Skorokhod | Ivan Varava | KAZKA | Mykola Ilyin | Olena Zuyeva | The act that received the fewest public votes was automatically eliminated. | |
| Eliminated: | Kseniya Popova; 2 of 4 votes Deadlock | Ostap Skorokhod; 2 of 4 votes Deadlock | Ivan Varava; 3 of 4 votes Majority | Olena Romanovska; Fewest votes to save | KAZKA; Fewest votes to save | Kablukami po bruschatke Fewest votes to save | Dasha Stupak; Fewest votes to win | Yurcash; Fewest votes to win |
| Eliminated: | Kseniya Popova; 2 of 4 votes Deadlock | Ostap Skorokhod; 2 of 4 votes Deadlock | Ivan Varava; 3 of 4 votes Majority | Anya Trubetskaya; 3 of 4 votes Majority | Mykola Ilyin; 3 of 4 votes Majority | Olena Zuyeva; 3 of 4 votes Majority | Dasha Stupak; Fewest votes to win | Yurcash; Fewest votes to win |

=== Live show details ===
==== Week 1 (11 November) ====
Contestants' performances on the first live show
| Act | Order | Song | Result |
|---|---|---|---|
| Olena Zuyeva | 1 | "Сдаться ты всегда успеешь" | Safe |
| Ivan Varava | 2 | "You're Beautiful" | Safe |
| Kablukami po bruschatke | 3 | "Туманы" | Safe |
| Kseniya Popova | 4 | "Stop!" | Bottom two |
| Mykola Ilyin | 5 | "Красавчик" | Safe |
| Anya Trubetskaya | 6 | "Шаленій" | Safe |
| Misha Panchishyn | 7 | "Сьюзі" | Safe |
| KAZKA | 8 | "Lost on You" | Safe |
| Olena Romanovska | 9 | "Я" | Safe |
| Ostap Skorokhod | 10 | "Supreme" | Bottom two |
| Dasha Stupak | 11 | "Перечекати" | Safe |
| Yurcash | 12 | "The Final Countdown" | Safe |
Final showdown details
| Ostap Skorokhod | 1 | "Demons" | Saved |
| Kseniya Popova | 2 | "Stay With Me" | Eliminated |

==== Week 2 (18 November) ====
Contestants' performances on the second live show
| Act | Order | Song | Result |
|---|---|---|---|
| KAZKA | 1 | "Dancing Queen" | Safe |
| Ostap Skorokhod | 2 | "City of Stars" | Bottom two |
| Olena Romanovska | 3 | "Padam, padam..." | Bottom two |
| Misha Panchishyn | 4 | "We Will Rock You" | Safe |
| Mykola Ilyin | 5 | "Пора соборов кафедральных" | Safe |
| Anya Trubetskaya | 6 | "Welcome To Burlesque" | Safe |
| Yurcash | 7 | "Горілка" | Safe |
| Dasha Stupak | 8 | "Who Wants to Live Forever" | Safe |
| Ivan Varava | 9 | "Can You Feel the Love Tonight" | Safe |
| Olena Zuyeva | 10 | "Я тебя никогда не забуду" | Safe |
| Kablukami po bruschatke | 11 | "Пусть всё будет так, как ты захочешь" | Safe |
Final showdown details
| Olena Romanovska | 1 | "Я буду всегда с тобой" | Saved |
| Ostap Skorokhod | 2 | "Тільки сьогодні" | Eliminated |

==== Week 3 (25 November) ====
Contestants' performances on the third live show
| Act | Order | Song | Result |
|---|---|---|---|
| Anya Trubetskaya | 1 | "Козачка" | Bottom two |
| Kablukami po bruschatke | 2 | "Пробач" | Safe |
| Ivan Varava | 3 | "Запроси мене у сни" | Bottom two |
| KAZKA | 4 | "Журавлi" | Safe |
| Olena Zuyeva | 5 | "Шлях додому" | Safe |
| Yurcash | 6 | "Могила" | Safe |
| Mykola Ilyin | 7 | "Эта женщина" | Safe |
| Dasha Stupak | 8 | "Я піду в далекі гори" | Safe |
| Olena Romanovska | 9 | "Свіча" | Safe |
| Misha Panchishyn | 10 | "Вона" | Safe |
Final showdown details
| Ivan Varava | 1 | "Люди" | Eliminated |
| Anya Trubetskaya | 2 | "Путь" | Saved |

==== Week 4 (2 December) ====
Contestants' performances on the fourth live show
| Act | Order | Song | Result |
|---|---|---|---|
| Yurcash | 1 | "Amar Pelos Dois" | Safe |
| Olena Zuyeva | 2 | "Я полюбила вас" | Safe |
| Anya Trubetskaya | 3 | "Зачем тебе я" | Bottom three |
| Mykola Ilyin | 4 | "Радовать" | Safe |
| Olena Romanovska | 5 | "Мой первый день без тебя" | Eliminated |
| KAZKA | 6 | "Forever Young" | Bottom three |
| Misha Panchishyn | 7 | "Вороны" | Safe |
| Kablukami po bruschatke | 8 | "Остров" | Safe |
| Dasha Stupak | 9 | "Smooth Operator" | Safe |
Final showdown details
| Anya Trubetskaya | 1 | "Sweet People" | Eliminated |
| KAZKA | 2 | "Highway to Hell" | Saved |

==== Week 5 (9 December) ====
Contestants' performances on the fifth live show
| Act | Order | Song | Result |
|---|---|---|---|
| Olena Zuyeva | 1 | "Бабы-стервы" | Safe |
| KAZKA | 2 | "Баллада о Любви" | Eliminated |
| Mykola Ilyin | 3 | "Я скучаю по тебе" | Bottom three |
| Kablukami po bruschatke | 4 | "Танго Магнолия" | Bottom three |
| Dasha Stupak | 5 | "Вьюга" | Safe |
| Misha Panchishyn | 6 | "Дым сигарет с ментолом" | Safe |
| «Yurcash» | 7 | "Украинский шансон" | Safe |
Final showdown details
| Mykola Ilyin | 1 | "Ночь" | Eliminated |
| Kablukami po bruschatke | 2 | "Баян" | Saved |

==== Week 6 (16 December) ====
Contestants' performances on the sixth live show
| Act | Order | First song | Order | Second song | Result |
|---|---|---|---|---|---|
| Kablukami po bruschatke | 1 | "Despacito" | 6 | "Звезды континентов" | Eliminated |
| Olena Zuyeva | 2 | "Бывший" | 7 | "La Isla Bonita" | Bottom three |
| Yurcash | 3 | "Oops!... I Did It Again" | 8 | "Mutter" | Safe |
| Misha Panchishyn | 4 | "Девчонка Девчоночка" | 9 | "Solo noi" | Safe |
| Dasha Stupak | 5 | "День Народження" | 10 | "Hijo de la Luna" | Bottom three |
Final showdown details
| Act | | Order | | Song | Result |
| Olena Zuyeva | | 1 | | "Нас бьют, мы летаем" | Eliminated |
| Dasha Stupak | | 2 | | "I Was Born to Love You" | Saved |

==== Week 7 Semi-final (23 December) ====
Contestants' performances on the seventh live show
| Act | Order | First Song | Order | Second Song | Order | Third Song | Result |
|---|---|---|---|---|---|---|---|
| Yurcash | 1 | "Капитан дирижабля" | 4 | "Sunny" (With Liz Mitchell) | 7 | "Я йду" | Safe |
| Dasha Stupak | 2 | "What's Up?" | 5 | "Thinking About it (Let It Go)" (With Nathan Goshen) | 8 | "Антарктида" | Eliminated |
| Misha Panchishyn | 3 | "Кофе мой друг" | 6 | "Крик" (With O.Torvald) | 9 | "Балада про мальви" | Safe |

==== Week 8 Final (30 December) ====
Contestants' performances on the eight live show
| Act | Order | First Song | Order | Second Song | Result |
|---|---|---|---|---|---|
| Yurcash | 1 | "Горілка" | 3 | "Stop Killing Love" | Runner-up |
| Misha Panchishyn | 2 | "Вороны" | 4 | "Країна мрій" | Winner |
