= Lviv Croissants =

Ukrainian bakery chain

- Industry: Catering
- Founded: 2015
- Founder: Andriy Yevhenovych Halytskyi; Yuriy Romanovych Zagrodskyi; Orest Orestovych Pechenko; Yevhen Yevhenovych Halytskyi
- Number of locations: 200 (as at May 2025)
- Products: croissants, coffee, tea, lemonades
- Website: https://lvivcroissants.com

Lviv Croissants (ukr. Львівські Круасани) is an international restaurant franchise specialising in croissants, with 189 outlets in Ukraine, 11 in Poland, two in the Czech Republic, two in the United States, and one each in France, Slovakia and South Korea. It is part of the Fast Food Franchising Group, which has its head office in Lviv. A distinctive feature of the menu is its freshly baked filled croissants.

== History of development ==
The franchise chain began in 2015 with a single outlet in Sumy, and within a year had signed 10 contracts at the ‘Franchise of the Year 2016’ exhibition and opened 27 outlets.

The chain subsequently added several dozen bakeries each year, and in 2020 launched a mobile app, an online ordering service and a drive-through format.

By 2023, Lviv Croissants had 153 outlets in Ukraine and 11 in Poland, becoming the largest chain in the country.

In 2024, the chain entered the markets of Slovakia, the United States and the Czech Republic, and in 2025 it opened its second outlets in the Czech Republic and the United States.

== Menu ==
A special feature of the menu is the filled croissants. The menu also includes coffee drinks, teas, lemonades and broth.

== Awards ==
- 2016 — ‘Franchise of the Year’ in the ‘Newcomer of the Year’ category
- 2023 — Forbes NEXT 250, a ranking of promising small and medium-sized companies
- 2024 — Ukraine's largest restaurant chain by number of outlets
- 2024 — winner in the ‘Best Value for Money’ category at the Bolt Food Awards

== Social initiatives ==
- Collaboration with the Tabletochki Foundation
- The ‘Ship of Goodness’ charity programme in partnership with the Kuzma Skryabin Charitable Foundation
- Participation in the ‘Feed a Doctor’ campaign
- Collaboration with the animated film ‘Mavka: The Forest Song’
- Collaboration with the United24 platform
- Collaboration with the ‘Come Back Alive’ Charitable Foundation
- Fitting out delivery rooms at the Lviv Perinatal Centre
