= Potap =

Ukrainian singer, rapper, and producer (born 1981)

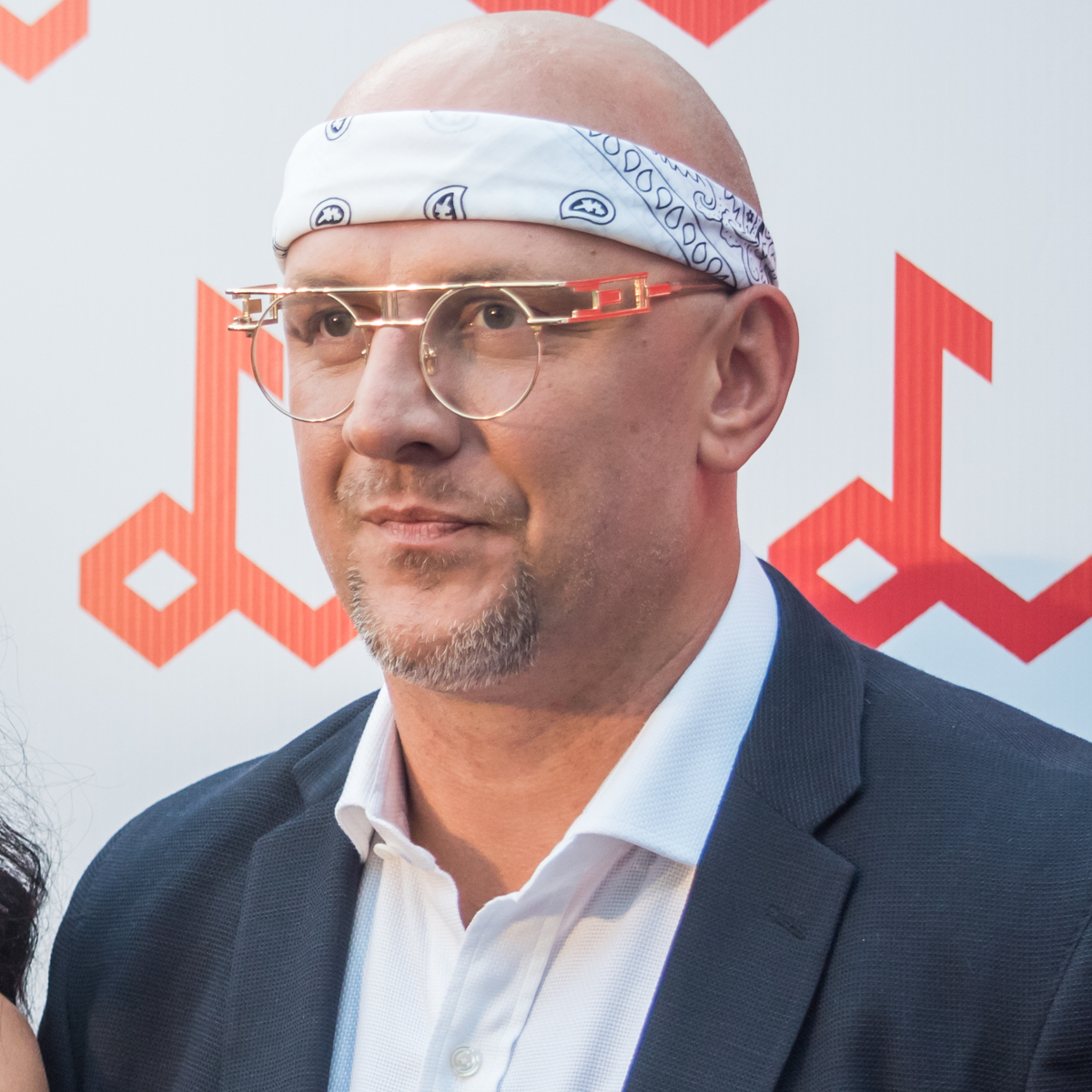
- Potap in 2017
- Born: Oleksiy Andriyovich Potapenko; 8 May 1981 (age 45); Kyiv, Ukrainian SSR, Soviet Union
- Education: National University of Ukraine on Physical Education and Sport, Kyiv National Economic University
- Occupations: Rapper; singer; songwriter; record producer
- Years active: 1997-present
- Spouses: Iryna Horova (m. 1999; div. 2014) Anastasiia Kamenskykh (m. 2019; div. 2026)
- Children: 1
- Musical career
- Genres: Hip Hop, Pop Rap, Pop, R&B, Dance Pop, Urban Pop
- Instrument: Vocals
- Label: MOZGI Entertainment
- Website: potapinastya.com, mozgientertainment.com

Oleksiy Andriyovich Potapenko (Ukrainian: Олексій Андрійович Потапенко; born 8 May 1981), known professionally as Potap (Потап) is a Ukrainian singer, rapper, songwriter, and producer. He has been involved as a performer and/or producer in Potap and Nastya duo, Vremya I Steklo, Mozgi, and some others, releasing over 300 songs.

== Biography ==
Oleksiy Potapenko was born on 8 May 1981 in Kyiv. His father, Andriy Potapenko (born 1956), served in the military. His mother, Lyudmila Potapenko (born 1958) is a world-fin swimming race champion. Oleksii has been practicing swimming and water polo, for which he received the title Master of Sports.

He has earned two degrees. The first one is as a PE instructor and water polo coach (National University of Ukraine on Physical Education and Sport). The second one is a Master of Economics, Entrepreneurship, and Audit (Kyiv National Economic University).

== Music career ==
Between 2000 and 2006, Potapenko performed as a part of a rap band called "VuZV" (Vhid u Zminnomu Vzutti – Re-shoe upon Entry). Potap's song "Na Svoey Volne" ("On its own") became the official soundtrack to the movie "Odin za vseh" ("One for all"). Another song co-written in collaboration with bands New'Z'Cool and XS became a main theme for an iconic horror movie produced in Ukraine, "Shtolna" ("The Adit").

In 2006, he teamed up with NK to create the duo "Potap & Nastya" where Oleksii acted as a producer, performer, songwriter, composer, video director, and scriptwriter. The duo debuted with the song "Ne Para" ("Don't Match") which turned into an international hit. In 2008, the duo released their debut album with the same title.

The artists released their second album titled "Ne Lubi Mne Mozgii" ("Don't Love my Brain") that included songs "Na Rayone" ("Down the neighborhood"), "Novii God" ("New Year"), "Chipsi, Chicksi, Lavandos" ("Chips, Chicks and Money").

The duo continued to achieve new successes. Within a few years of its formation, the duo had received numerous awards across the post-Soviet region, including: "Zolotoi Gramophon" ("Gold Gramophone Awards"), "Pesnya Goda" ("Song of the Year"), "RU.TV", "Premia Muz-TV" ("Muz TV Awards"), and many more. The songs "Esli Vdrug tebya ne stanet" ("If you're suddenly gone") and "Mi Otmenyaem Konets Sveta" ("We Cancel the Apocalypse") played in the TV show "Dnevnik Doctora Zaytsevoy" ("The Diary of Zaytseva M.D.").

In 2013, Potap & Nastya produced their third album, "Vse Puchkom" ("Everything's Cool"). The song with the same title received the "Gold Gramophone" award and remained for a while on top of the most highly rated charts across countries along with another track from the album "Chumachechaya Vesna" ("Krazy Spring").

The duo created by Oleksii and NK was officially the most popular touring duo in the country. The joint activity of the artists was followed by success and achievements. "Potap & Nastya" became awardees of various international music festivals, receiving over 50 rewards that include: "M1 Music Awards", "Song of the Year", "Gold Gramophone", "Muz TV Award", "Sharmanka" ("Music Box") and "RU.TV". In 2017, the duo was recognized for its "Contribution to the development of the National Scene".

In 2014, Oleksii launched the band MOZGI, where he has acted as a producer, performer, songwriter, composer, director, and scriptwriter up to the current day. Between 2015 and 2018, MOZGI was 5 times nominated for the Yearly Ukrainian National Awards and 4 for M1 Music Awards, winning twice in the latter one.

In 2014, Potap and Kamenskih were criticized in Ukraine for continuing to attend award ceremonies in Russia, while many Ukrainians believed their country was a victim of Russian aggression. Regarding this, they responded: "It's a shame that we have to collect the journalists to tell them that we are from Ukraine and love our country!" In 2016, "Potap and Nastya" concerts were disrupted in Ukraine in protest of them continuing to tour in Russia.

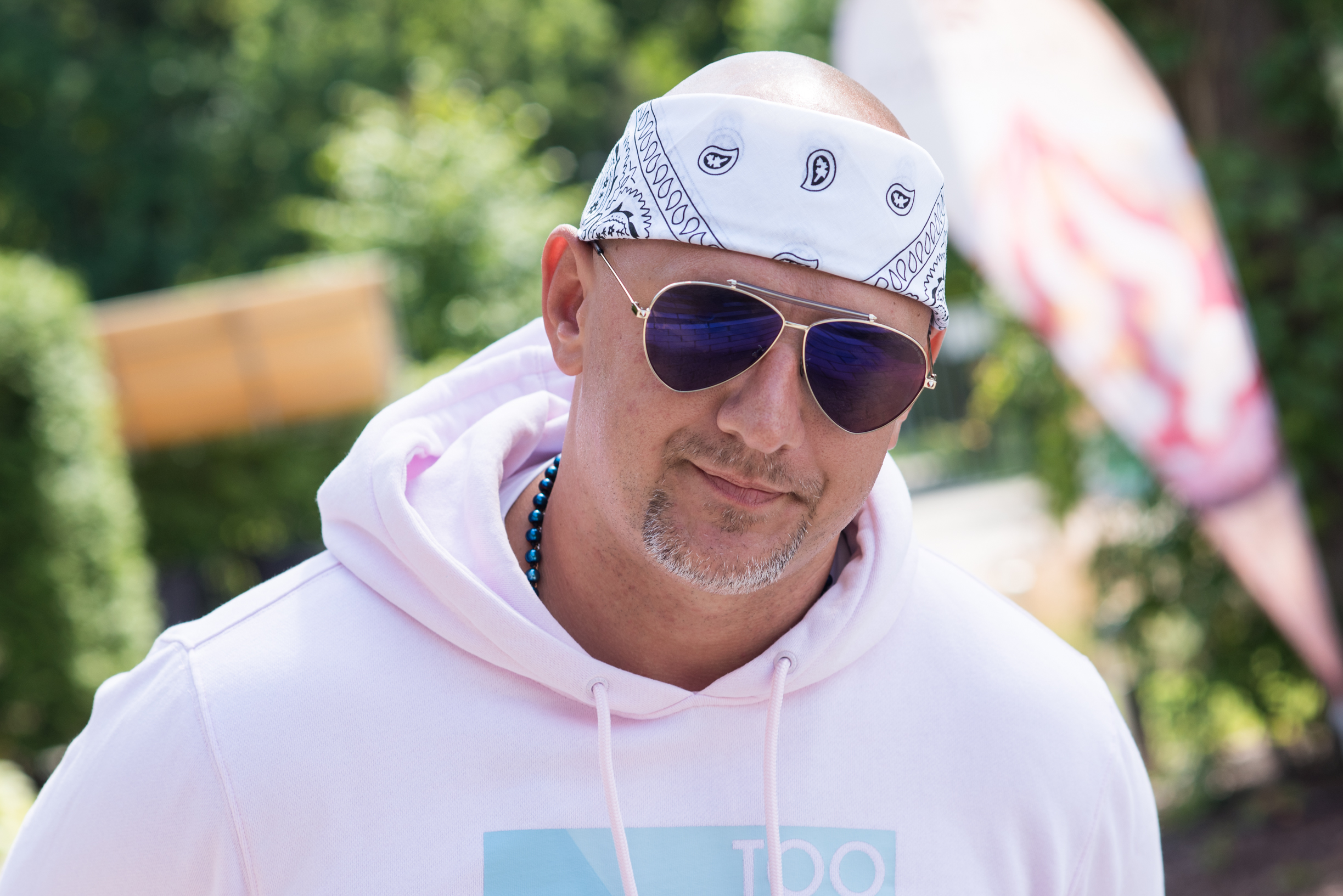
Potap in 2017

In 2017, the duo announced the pause of their activity to start solo projects: PTP and NK respectively. The first solo album by PTP, "Spelie Slivi EP" ("Ripe Plums EP"), was released on 3 November 2017. Oleksii and Nastya's collaborative work wasn't over. Potap kept on writing songs for NK. With support from his side, NK presented such hits as "#etomoyanoch" ("#thatmytypeofnight"), co-written Ukrainian song "Trimay" ("Hold it"), "Dai Mne" ("Gimme"), international hit in Spanish and English "Peligroso" ("Dangerous"), LOMALA and "Popa Kak U Kim" ("Ass Like Kim's"). "Hold it" has taken over national top charts, remaining on top for over the year and being recognized at the YUNA Awards 2019 as a Pop Hit of the Year, while Peligroso remained in Billboard top charts under the Tropical Songs ranking for 6 weeks.

== Production ==
Today, Potap is the head of "MOZGI Entertainment" – the label he established that is responsible for managing bands MOZGI, Vremia I Steklo (Time and Glass), and singers Michelle Andrade and Ingret.

In 2012, MOZGI Entertainment launched a new branch, MOZGI Production. The company gathered specialists who were previously involved in making videos for Potap's artists' development company. In 2019, a music video for the song "Polube" ("Anyway") by MOZGI was nominated for the Berlin Music Video Awards.

In 2015, music projects managed under MOZGI Entertainment participated in the following nominations: "Hit of the Year" (Vremya I Steklo – Imya 505 (Name 505) and Potap & Nastya – "Boomdiggibai" ("Boomdiggibai"), "Band of the Year" (Vremya I Steklo and Potap & Nastya), "Project of the Year": "MOZGI", Potap & Nastya feat. Bianca), "Music Video of the Year" (Vremya I Steklo – "Name 505", Potap & Nastya – "Boomdiggibai"). The awards were assigned the following way: "Hit of the Year" to Vremya I Steklo for "Name 505", while "Band of the Year" with top charts awards "Gold Gramophone" and M1 were given to Potap & Nastya. Moreover, that year Oleksii was renowned as the Best Producer of the Year. The same year, director Dimitri Archipovich, who worked цшер MOZGI Production at that time was announced as the Best Director of the Cut.

== Soundtracks ==
In 2011, Oleksii Potapenko wrote the main theme song for the movie "Vikrutasi" ("Monkey Business"). The track performed by "Potap & Nastya" became the key element of the promo campaign for the movie.

In 2014, NK and Oleksii were featured in an animated movie "The Seventh Dwarf". They performed soundtracks to the movie as well. One of those, "Ver' v svoi sily" ("Believe in yourself"), was greatly welcomed by the audience and gained radio airplay.

In 2018, the movie "Bezumnaya Svad'ba" ("Crazy Wedding") was released. Upon its release, the movie set the record for box office sales among all Ukrainian premieres by collecting ₴50,664,000. Oleksii Potapenko not only featured in the movie but wrote and produced an original motion soundtrack album that included 2 songs nominated for M1 Music Awards. Those are "Naikrashii Den'" ("The Best Day"), performed with Male Artist of the Year Oleg Vinnyk, and "Promin'" ("Gleam"), written and performed in collaboration with all MOZGI Production stars.

== Personal life ==
He has son from the previous marriage with Iryna Horova (divorced). On 23 May 2019, Potap and Nastya Kamenskih were married.

== Television ==
TV carrier Oleksii Potapenko started with a show "Karaoke Against People" on the M1 Music Channel. For over ten years, Oleksii has actively participated in popular TV shows in Ukraine, including The Voice of Ukraine and the comedy show Laughter League on the biggest channel in Ukraine 1+1. At both shows, Potap is a judge and mentor who has helped a lot of emerging artists to unleash their potential.

The full list of shows Oleksii has been involved at:

- "Karaoke protiv naroda" (Karaoke Against People on M1) – TV host (2008–2009)
- Guten Morgen (M1) – TV host (2009–2010)
- Ya lublu Ukrainu (I Love Ukraine on 1+1) – TV host (2010)
- Superzveda (Superstar o 1+1) – a judge (2010)
- Telezvezda (TV-star on TRK Ukraine) – TV host (2010)
- 15th Anniversary of 1+1 – TV host (2010)
- "GPU" (1+1) – TV host (2010–2011)
- Zvezda + Zvezda (Star + Star on 1+1) – a judge (2010–2011)
- The Voice. Kids – mentor (2015–2016)
- Liga Smeha (The Laughter League) – coach (2015–2018)
- The Voice – mentor (2015–2020, 2022-2023)

== Filmography ==
- 2005 – Odin za vseh ("One for All")
- 2008 – Krasnaya Shapochka ("Little Red Riding Hood") – The Wolf
- 2010 – Novogodnie Svaty ("New Year's Matchmakers") – cameo
- 2011 – Nebesnie rodstvenniki ("Family from Heaven") – cameo
- 2012 – Rjevskii protiv Napaleona (Rjevsky versus Napoleon) – mob
- 2013 – 1+1 at home – cameo
- 2013 – Zaycev +1 – TV Host
- 2018 – Bezumnaya Svad'ba (Crazy Wedding) – The Reverend Evlampii

== Discography ==
- 2004 – Potap – Na svoei volne ili ano kaneshno potomusho shojh ("On its own or it's just because")
- 2006 – Potap – Na drugoi volne ili ano kaneshno potomusho shojh ("On another frequency or it's just because")
- 2008 – Potap & Nastya – Nepara ("Not a Couple")
- 2009 – Potap & Nastya – Ne lubi mne mozgi ("Don't love my brains")
- 2013 – Potap & Nastya – Vse Puchkom ("Everything's Cool")
- 2015 – Potap & Nastya – Shchit I Myach ("Shield and ball")
- 2015 – Mozgi – Bikini Album
- 2015 – Mozgi – Elektroshaurma ("eDoner")
- 2016 – Mozgi –Bar
- 2017 – Mozgi – Na belom ("On white")
- 2017 – PTP – Spelie Slivi EP ("Ripe Plums EP")
- 2018 – Mozgi – Vinos mozga ("Brain explosion")

=== Music videos ===
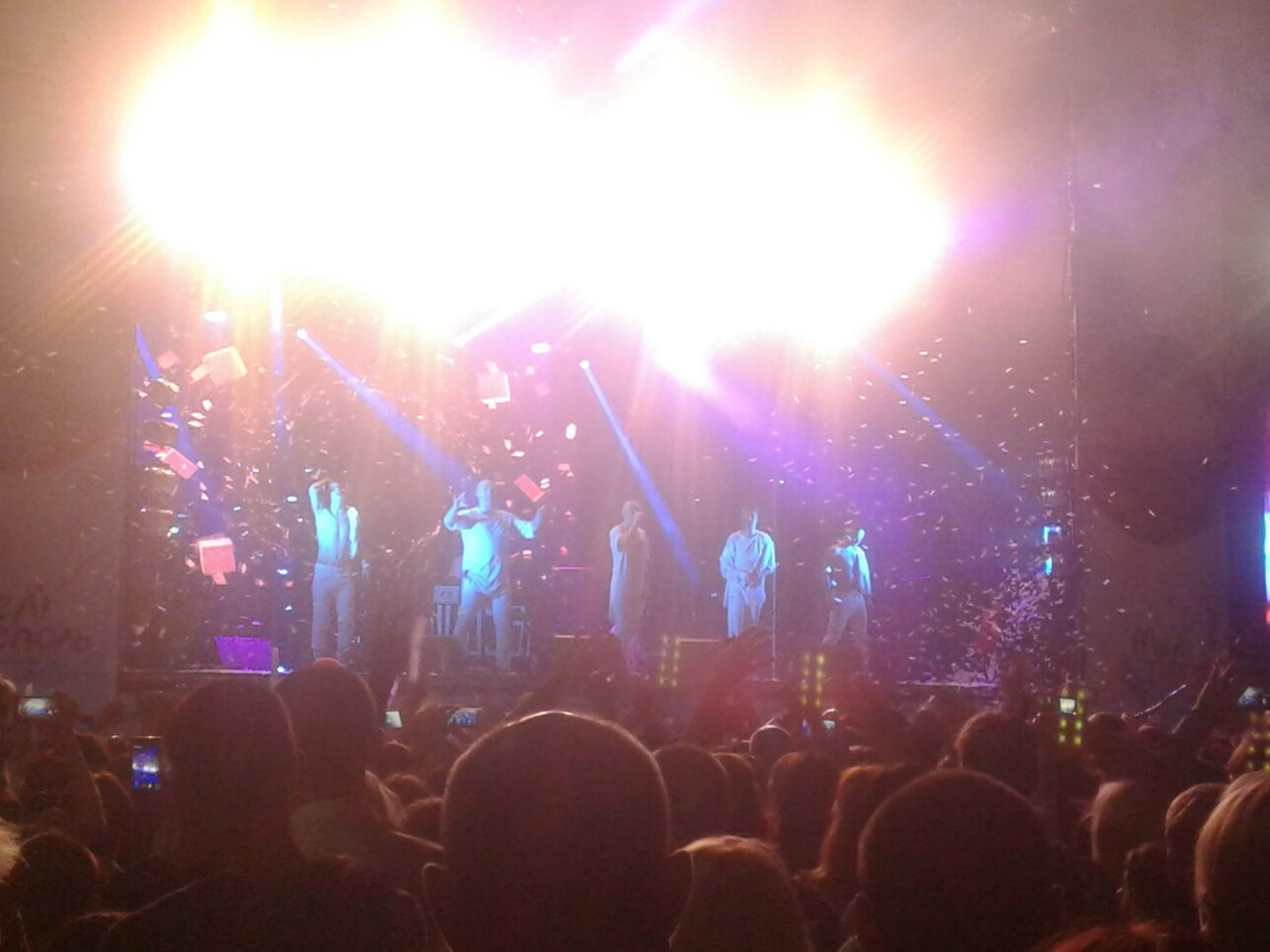
Potap in Melitopol

- Potap - Shivorot na vivorot ("Inside Out", 2005)
- Potap – Na svoey Volne ("On its own", 2005)
- Potap & Nastya – Bez Lubvi ("Without Love", 2006)
- Potap & Nastya – Nepara ("Not a Couple", 2006)
- Potap & Nastya – Krepkie Oreshki ("Hard Balls", 2007)
- Potap & Nastya – Vnature ("Forreal", 2007)
- Potap, dyadya Vadya, UGO – Natasha (2008)
- Potap & Nastya – Razgulai ("Partyboy", 2008)
- Potap & Nastya – Na rayone ("Down the neighborhood", 2008)
- Potap, dyadya Vadya, UGO – Ya pomnu ("I remember", 2008)
- Potap & Nastya – Pochemu ("Why", 2008)
- Potap & Nastya – Ne lubi mne mozgi ("Don't love my brains", 2009)
- Potap feat. New"Z"cool, dyadya Vadya, UGO – Kachaem ("Rockin'", 2009)
- Potap & Nastya – Novii God ("New Year", 2009)
- Potap & Nastya – Cry Me a River (2010)
- Potap & Co – Leto ("Summer", 2010)
- Potap & Co – More penitsa ("Sea Foaming", 2010)
- Potap and Vera Brezhneva – Pronto (2010)
- Potap & Nastya – Vikrutasi ("Monkey Business", 2011)
- Potap & Nastya – Chumachechaya Vesna ("Krazy Spring", 2011)
- Potap & Nastya – Mi Otmenaem konets sveta ("We cancel the apocalypse", 2011)
- Potap & Nastya – Esli vdrug ("Just in case", 2011)
- Arkady Laikin – Laiki ("Likes", 2012)
- Potap & Nastya – Priletelo ("Flew in", 2012)
- Potap & Nastya – Uletelo ("Flew out", 2012)
- Potap & Nastya – Awesome Summer (2012)
- Potap & Nastya – Lubov' so skidkoi ("Love with a discount", 2012)
- Vremya I Steklo feat. Potap – Sleza ("A Tear", 2012)
- Arkady Laikin feat Pozitiff – Seksualnii ("Sexy", 2013)
- Arkady Laikin – Malimenya ("Begme", 2013)
- Potap & Nastya – RuRuRu (2013)
- Potap & Nastya – Vmeste ("Together", 2013)
- Potap & Nastya – Vse Puchkom ("Everything's Cool", 2013)
- Potap & Nastya – Udi-udi (2014)
- Mozgi – Ayabo (2014)
- Mozgi – Hlam ("Trash", 2014)
- Mozgi – Nozhompo (2015)
- Potap & Nastya – Bumdigibai (2015)
- Mozgi – Hit moego leta ("Hit of my Summer", 2015)
- Potap & Nastya feat. Bianka – Stil Sobachki ("Doggy Style", 2015)
- Mozgi – Vertolet ("Helicopter", 2015)
- Potap & Nastya – U mami ("At Mom's", 2016)
- Potap & Nastya – Ya…ya ("Poisonous", 2017)
- Mozgi – Atyatya (2017)
- PTP feat. PZT – Malibu (2017)
- Mozgi – Ale Ale ("Hello hello", 2018)
- Mozgi – Vlazhni Plyazhnii Dvij (Wet Beach Grove, 2018)
- Mozgi – Polube ("Anyways", 2018)
- NK – Popa Kak U Kim ("Ass like Kim's", 2019)
- Mozgi – Digitalization (2019)

== Director ==
- Potap – Shivorot na vivorot ("Inside Out", 2005)
- Potap – Na svoey Volne ("On its own", 2005)
- David — Big Girl Now (2006)
- Potap & Nastya – Bezz Lubvi ("Without Love", 2006)
- Potap & Nastya – Nepara ("Not a Couple", 2006)
- Queens & New'Z'Cool — Ozero Slyoz (Lake of tears, 2007)
- Potap & Nastya – Krepkie Oreshki ("Hard Balls", 2007)
- Potap & Nastya – Vnature ("Forreal", 2007)
- Queens & New'Z'Cool — 5 element (2007)
- Potap & Nastya – Razgulai ("Partyboy", 2008)
- Queens& New'Z'Cool — Kto-to skazal mne (Somebody told me, 2008)
- Potap & Nastya – Na rayone ("Down the neighborhood", 2008)
- Potap & Nastya – Pochemu ("Why", 2008)
- Potap & Nastya – Ne lubi mne mozgi ("Don't love my brains", 2009)
- Potap feat. New"Z"cool, dyadya Vadya, UGO – Kachaem ("Rockin'", 2009)
- Potap & Nastya – Novii God ("New Year", 2009)
- Potap & Nastya – Cry Me a River (2010)
- Potap & Co – Leto ("Summer", 2010)
- Potap & Co – More penitsa ("Sea Foaming", 2010)
- Potp & Nastya – "Chipsi, Chicksi, Lavandos" (Chips, Chicks and Money", 2010)
- Potap and Vera Brezhneva – Pronto (2010)
- Vremya i Steklo – Tak Vipala Karta ("It was meant by destiny", 2010)
- Potap & Nastya – Vikrutasi ("Monkey Business", 2011)
- Potap & Nastya – Chumachechaya Vesna ("Krazy Spring", 2011)
- Potap & Nastya – Mi Otmenaem konets sveta ("We cancel the apocalypse", 2011)
- Potap & Nastya – Esli vdrug ("Just in case", 2011)
- Vremya i Steklo – Lubvi tochka net ("No love", 2011)
- Vremya i Steklo – Serebryanoe More ("Silver sea", 2011)
- Vremya i Steklo – Kafel' ("Tiles", 2011)
- Arkady Laikin – Laiki ("Likes", 2012)
- Niko Neman – Uletayu ("Flying away", 2012)
- Vremya I Steklo feat. Potap – Sleza ("A Tear", 2012)
- Potap & Nastya – RuRuRu (2013)
- Arkady Laikin feat Pozitiff – Seksualnii ("Sexy", 2013)
- Potap & Nastya – Vmeste ("Together", 2013)
- Vremya I Steklo - #kAroche ("#kEeoitshort", 2013)
- Aleksandr Kogan – Kto pridumal mir ("Who invented the world?", 2013)
- Potap & Nastya – Udi-udi (2014)
- Mozgi – Ayabo (2014)
- Mozgi – Hlam ("Trash", 2014)
- Zara – Schastie nad zemlei ("Happiness larger than the Earth", 2014)
- Vremya I steklo – Imya 505 ("Name 505", 2015)
- Vremya I steklo – Pesnya 404 ("Song 404", 2015)
- Mozgi – Nozhompo (2015)
- Potap & Nastya – Bumdigibai (2015)
- Mozgi – Hit moego leta ("Hit of my Summer", 2015)
- Potap & Nastya feat. Bianka – Stil Sobachki ("Doggy Style", 2015)
- Mozgi – Vertolet ("Helicopter", 2015)
- Vremya I Steklo – Naverno potomu chto ("Maybe Because", 2016)
- Potap & Nastya – U mami ("At Mom's", 2016)
- Potap & Nastya – Ya…ya ("Poisonous", 2017)
- Vremya I Steklo – Na stile ("Stylish", 2017)
- PTP feat. PZT – Malibu (2017)
