= Tabletochki Charity Foundation =

Ukrainian charity for children with cancer

Tabletochki CF
- Founded: 2011
- Founders: Olya Kudinenko, Olha Shurupova
- Type: Charitable Foundation
- Purpose: To ensure that no Ukrainian child dies of cancer
- Location: 01010, Kyiv, 4/6 Omelianovycha-Pavlenka Str., 14th floor
- Key people: Viacheslav Bykov (CEO)
- Revenue: Grants, charitable donations
- Website: tabletochki.org

Tabletochki Charity Foundation is a Ukrainian non-profit organization helping children with oncological and hematological diseases.

Tabletochki is a crowdfunded organization supported by individuals, corporate donors and grants. Foundation operates in four areas: targeted family support, systematic support for pediatric oncology centers, advocating for changes in the healthcare system, and professional development of medical staff.

The Foundation's mission is to create favorable conditions for high-end medical care, psychological support and improve the quality of life of Ukrainian children with cancer during and after treatment.

== History ==
The Foundation started in 2011 by Olya Kudinenko, as a volunteering project purchasing medicines for children fighting cancer.

Since 2012 Foundation, in addition to purchasing medicines, provides apartments for temporary accommodation for sick children and their parents. In 2013–2017 years Foundation improved control over donor blood in government hospitals, launched programs of psychological help, children palliative care and animal-assisted therapy.

In 2018 Tabletochki Foundation joined the global Giving Tuesday movement.

According to the open Foundation reports, in the period of 2011–2024 years over $31 million was spent on targeted assistance for 7500 children, purchasing medical equipment for hospitals and supporting launched programs.

After the beginning of the Russian invasion of Ukraine, Tabletochki joined the St. Jude Hospital program to provide safe evacuation for childhood cancer patients and their families out of Ukraine. After over a year of full-scale war, Tabletochki continues assisting kids and their families. The foundation also helps in the process of evacuating new children based on the decision of doctors. Some children have finished treatment abroad and returned home. Another similar program for children with cancer was announced by Richard Brenson.

== Activity ==
Tabletochki provides monthly care for 400 children with cancer and 12 oncological departments all over Ukraine. Other Foundations programs include purchasing medical equipment for hospitals, carrying out repairs in hospital departments, different types of care and therapy programs, and training of medical staff. In 2022 thanks to Foundations programs, 125 doctors and other healthcare professionals gained new knowledge and developed their professional skills in leading clinics in the Netherlands, Spain, Germany, Poland, the Czech Republic and Turkey.

Charity programs

Foundation organizes annual fundraising and charity campaigns, such as:

- "Gifts for Health" — Christmas fundraising activity during which donors can pay for medicines or other necessary items for children battling cancer.
- "Coins for Children" — is an activity during which school and corporate teams collect coins and transfer them to help children with cancer. In 2021, the National Bank of Ukraine supported the campaign.
- "Tabletochki Giving Tuesday Dinner" — within the international movement Giving Tuesday, and in support of Zagoriy Foundation, Tabletochki provides annual charity fundraising dinners. Thanks to the project, the Okhmatdyt national children's hospital in Kyiv and the Western Ukrainian Specialized Children's Medical Center in Lviv received modern medical equipment.

Participation in the law-making process

The Foundation participates in the law-making process: made charity donations via SMS legal, lobbied law about visiting patients in the intensive care unit, advocated for state funding for the life-saving medicine Erwinase. Also, Tabletochki together with non-profit organizations, public authorities, volunteers, and lawyers achieved extending of the list of other medicines for children with cancer to be procured using public funds. In 2021, Foundation experts developed part of the Ukrainian National Cancer Control Strategy until 2030.

In 2023, Tabletochki signed a new memorandum with the Ministry of Health of Ukraine. This is a continuation of the document signed in 2017. The document confirms the common goal of ensuring that all children with cancer and hematological diseases receive high-quality medical care.

Support and ambassadors

Tabletochki cooperates with Ukrainian state authorities and non-profit organizations. Among the Foundation's donors are Mastercard, Lenovo, La Roche Posay, Uber, Watsons, Save the Children, Samsung, and Virgin Unite.

Foundation's ambassadors are Ukrainian singers Nastia Kamenskykh and Zlata Ognevich.

== International cooperation ==
The Foundation is a member of international associations and cooperates with hospitals in Europe, the US, and the Middle East:

- Union for International Cancer Control
- Childhood Cancer International
- International Society of Paediatric Oncology
- St. Jude Children's Global Alliance
- The Hospital for Sick Children (SickKids)
- Princess Máxima Center
- King Hussein Cancer Center

== Awards ==
National Charity Rating:

- Winner: Dynamics in charitable spending growth in 2013-2014 (2015)
- Winner: Number of Volunteers Involved 2015 (2016)

European Communications Awards:

- Award winner for Advocacy Campaign Project – unrestricted access to intensive care units (2017)

Effie Awards Ukraine:

- Gold for Best Marketing Team in Social Organizations and Charitable Foundations category (2019)
- Gold in Social Media Advertising for Charities and Successful Social Media Campaigns (2018)

SABRE Awards EMEA:

- 1st place in category PR World of Mouth Project: Charity run Dobrorun (2021)
