= Bolt Food =

Food delivery service

- Type: Division
- Industry: Online food ordering
- Founded: August 2019; 7 years ago
- Founders: Markus Villig
- Headquarters: Tallinn, Estonia
- Area served: 15 countries in Europe and 2 in Africa: Azerbaijan, Bulgaria, Cyprus, Czech Republic, Estonia, Georgia, Ghana, Kenya, Latvia, Lithuania, Malta, Poland, Portugal, Romania, Slovakia, Ukraine
- Services: Food delivery, Grocery delivery
- Parent: Bolt
- Website: food.bolt.eu

Bolt Food is an online food ordering and delivery platform launched by Estonian mobility company Bolt in 2019. Meals and groceries are delivered by couriers using cars, scooters, bikes, or on foot. Bolt Food is operational in over 80 cities across 19 countries as of 2023.

The service has more than 6 million registered users globally, and features more than 30,000 partner restaurants and chains.

In 2021, Bolt Food launched its rapid grocery delivery service, Bolt Market.

== History ==
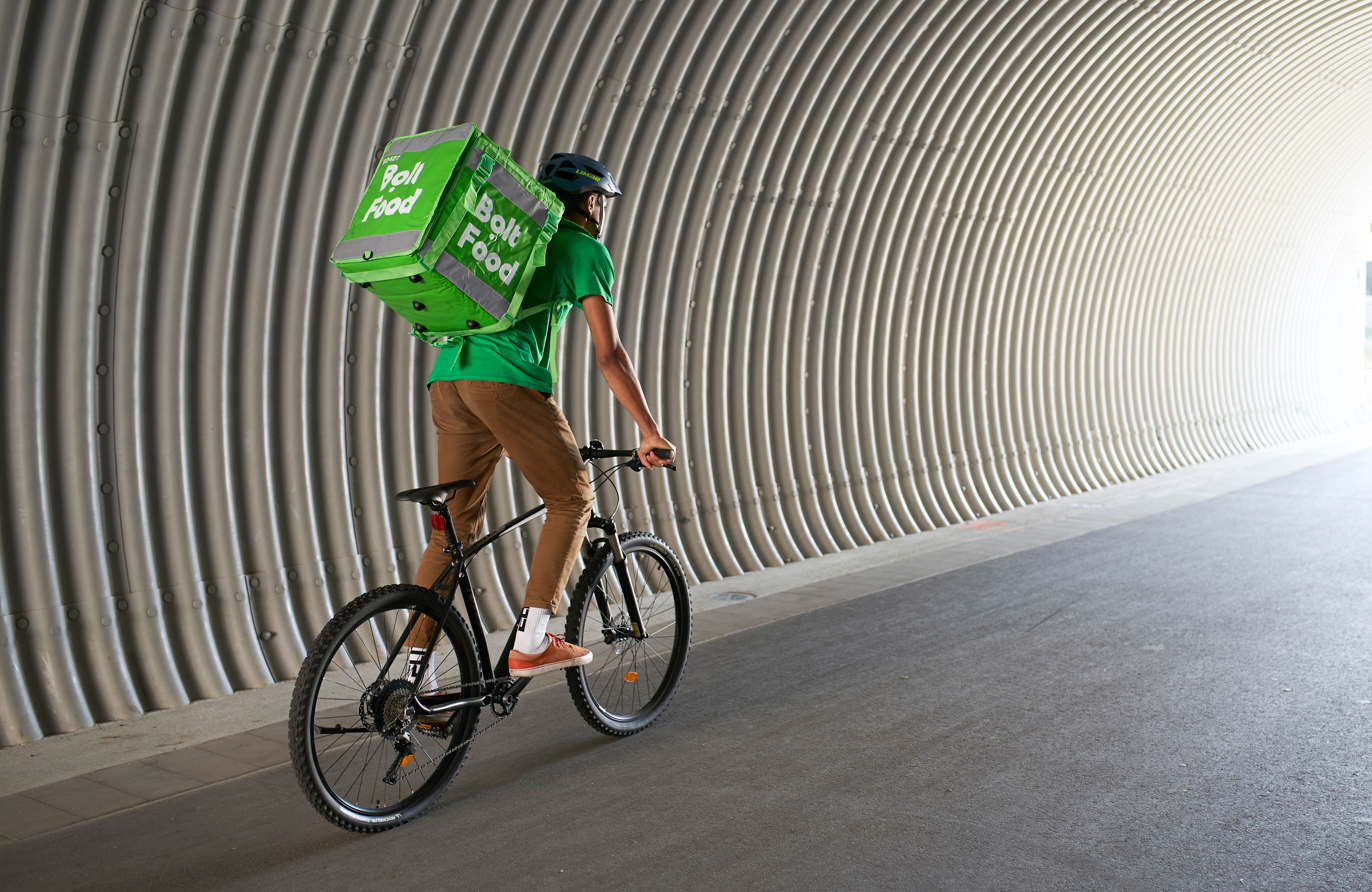
A Bolt Food courier in Tallinn, Estonia

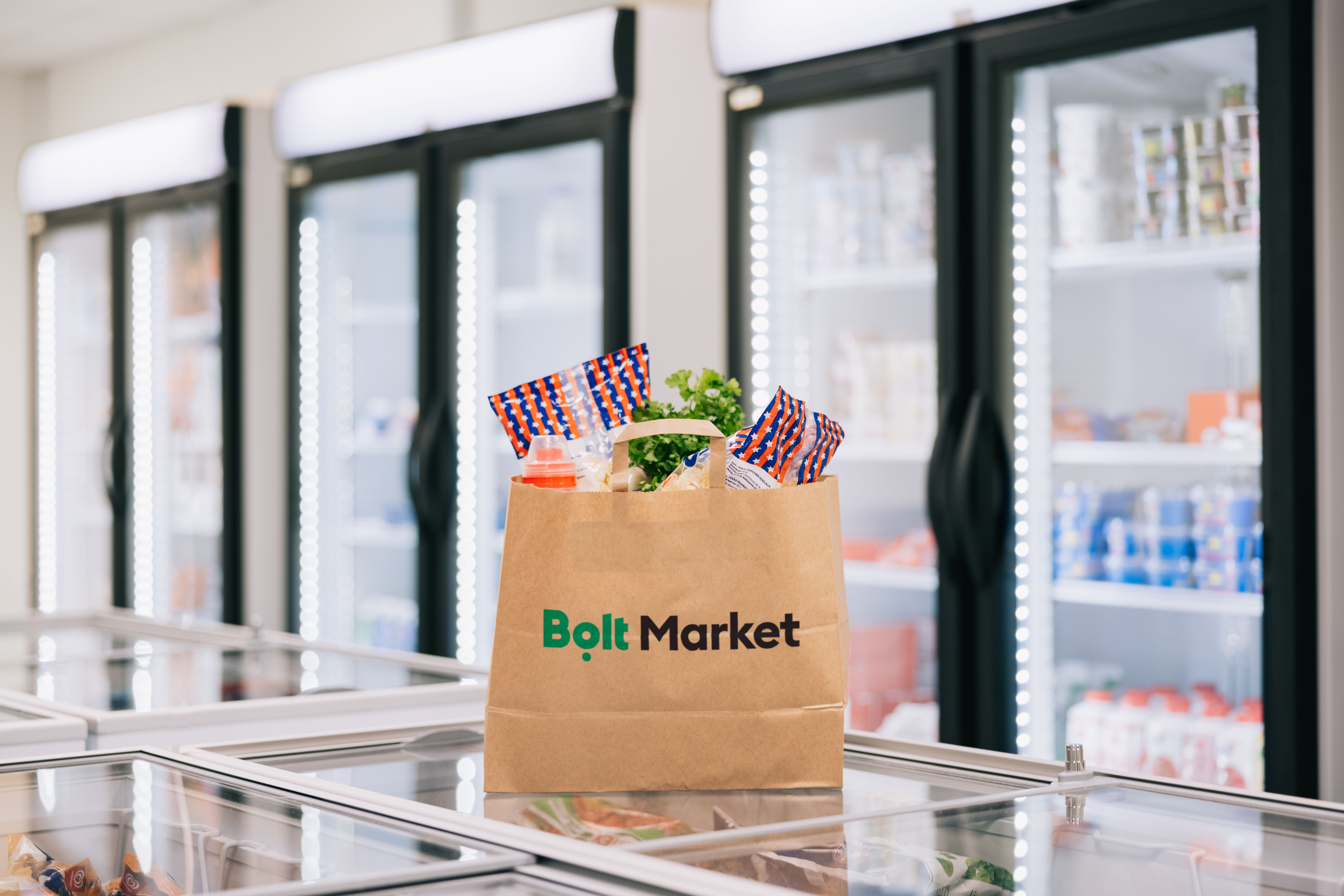
A Bolt Market grocery bag in Lisbon, Portugal

Transport company, Bolt diversified into food delivery in August 2019, launching Bolt Food in Tallinn, Estonia and announcing plans to expand the service to Latvia, Lithuania, and South Africa later that year.

During the launch, Bolt's Chief Product Officer, Jevgeni Kabanov, said that establishing a food delivery service had been a popular request from existing Bolt users for quite some time.

In April 2021, the Bolt Food app was added to the Huawei AppGallery after Huawei claimed to have received more than 2,000 requests for users to onboard the mobile app.

In August 2021, Bolt raised €600 million to launch the Bolt Market grocery delivery service.

In January 2022, the company announced that it had raised €628 million at a €7.4 billion valuation to expand its transport and food delivery super app.

As of January 2023, Bolt Food operates in more than 80 cities and 19 countries in Europe and Africa.

Bolt Food announced it will cease operations in South Africa and Nigeria in December 2023.

== Grocery delivery ==
In 2021, Bolt announced the launch of Bolt Market, a grocery delivery service available on the Bolt Food app.

Bolt Market stores offer delivery of groceries and household essentials like pet care, personal care, baby care and home care products. The service expanded its selection to more than 3,000 products per store and has matched supermarket prices for hundreds of key products.

Bolt Market launched in Tallinn, Estonia and expanded to Latvia, Lithuania, Portugal, Romania, Poland, Slovakia, Croatia, and the Czech Republic in 2021 and Sweden in January 2022.

As of January 2023, Bolt Market is operational in 6 countries: Estonia, Latvia, Lithuania, Portugal, Romania, and Poland. Bolt has partnered with other grocery stores in countries where Bolt Market does not have a presence, as well as in the aforementioned countries.

== See also ==
- Bolt
- Cyclologistics
