= Bolt (company) =

Estonian mobility company

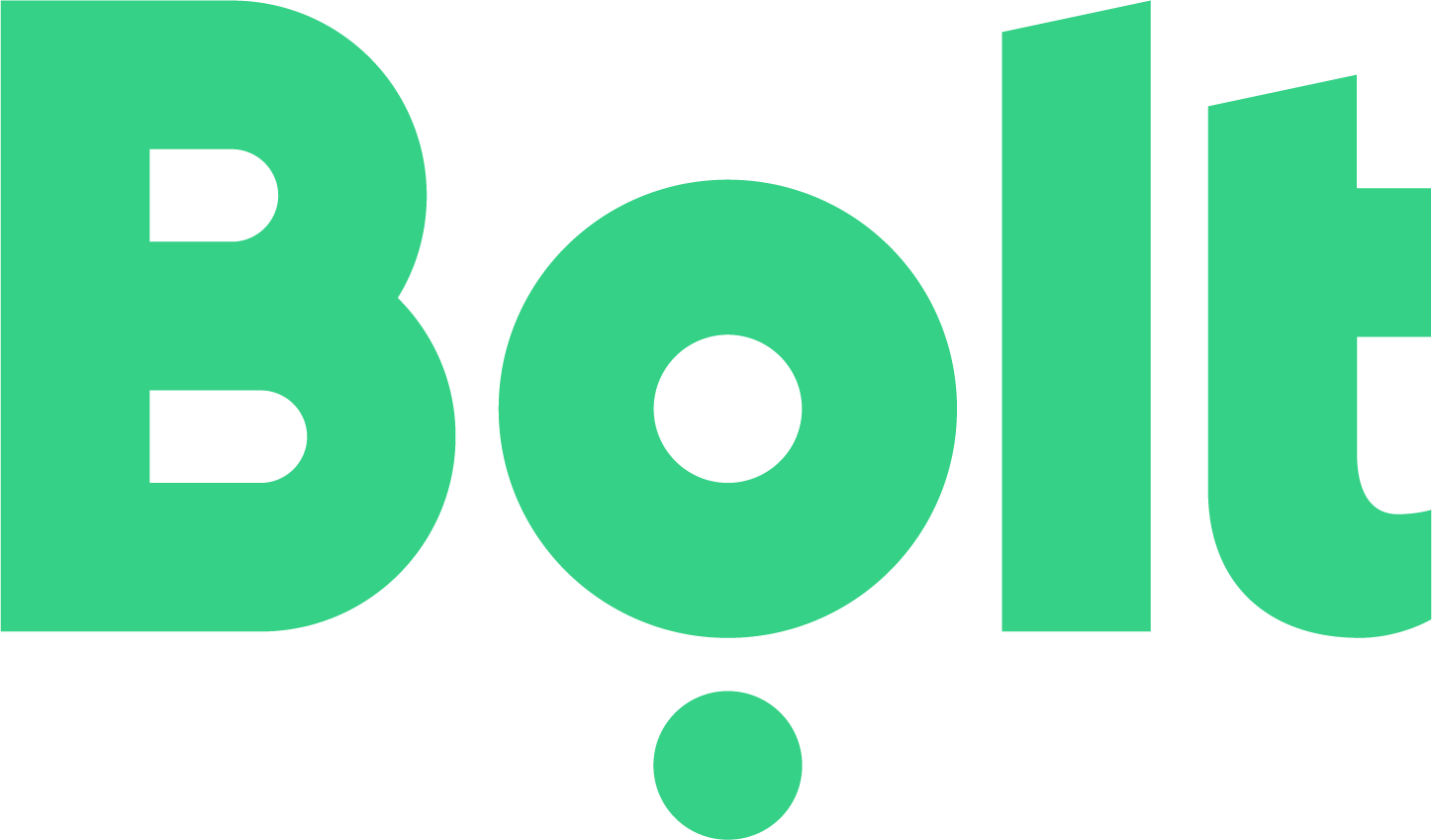
- Native name: Bolt Technology OÜ
- Formerly: mTakso, Taxify
- Industry: Transportation; Mobility as a service
- Founded: August 2013; 13 years ago
- Founder: Markus Villig
- Headquarters: Tallinn, Estonia
- Area served: 50 countries in Europe, Africa, Western Asia, Southeast Asia and Latin America
- Products: Mobile app, website
- Services: Ridesharing company, scooter-sharing system, food delivery, grocery delivery, car-sharing
- Revenue: ▲€2.27 billion (2025)
- Operating income: ▲€19.5 million (2025)
- Net income: ▲€0.9 million (2025)
- Total assets: ▲€832.5 million (2025)
- Number of employees: ▲4,284 (2025)
- Website: bolt.eu

Bolt (official name Bolt Technology OÜ) is an Estonian multinational mobility company that offers ride-hailing, micromobility rental, food and grocery delivery (via the Bolt Food app), and carsharing services. The company is headquartered in Tallinn and operates in over 850 cities in more than 50 countries in Europe, Africa, Asia and Latin America.

== History ==
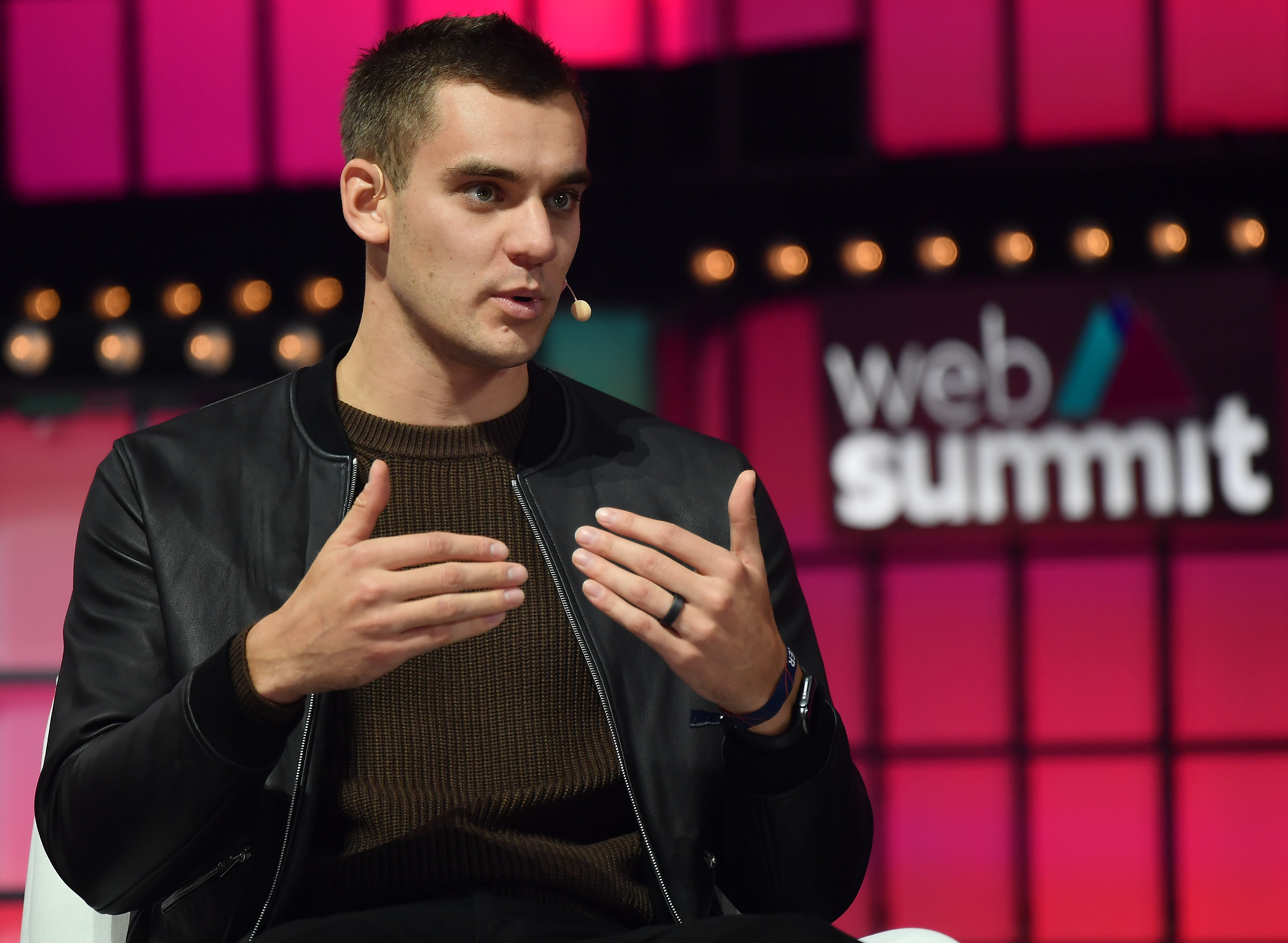
Markus Villig, Founder & CEO of Bolt, in 2021

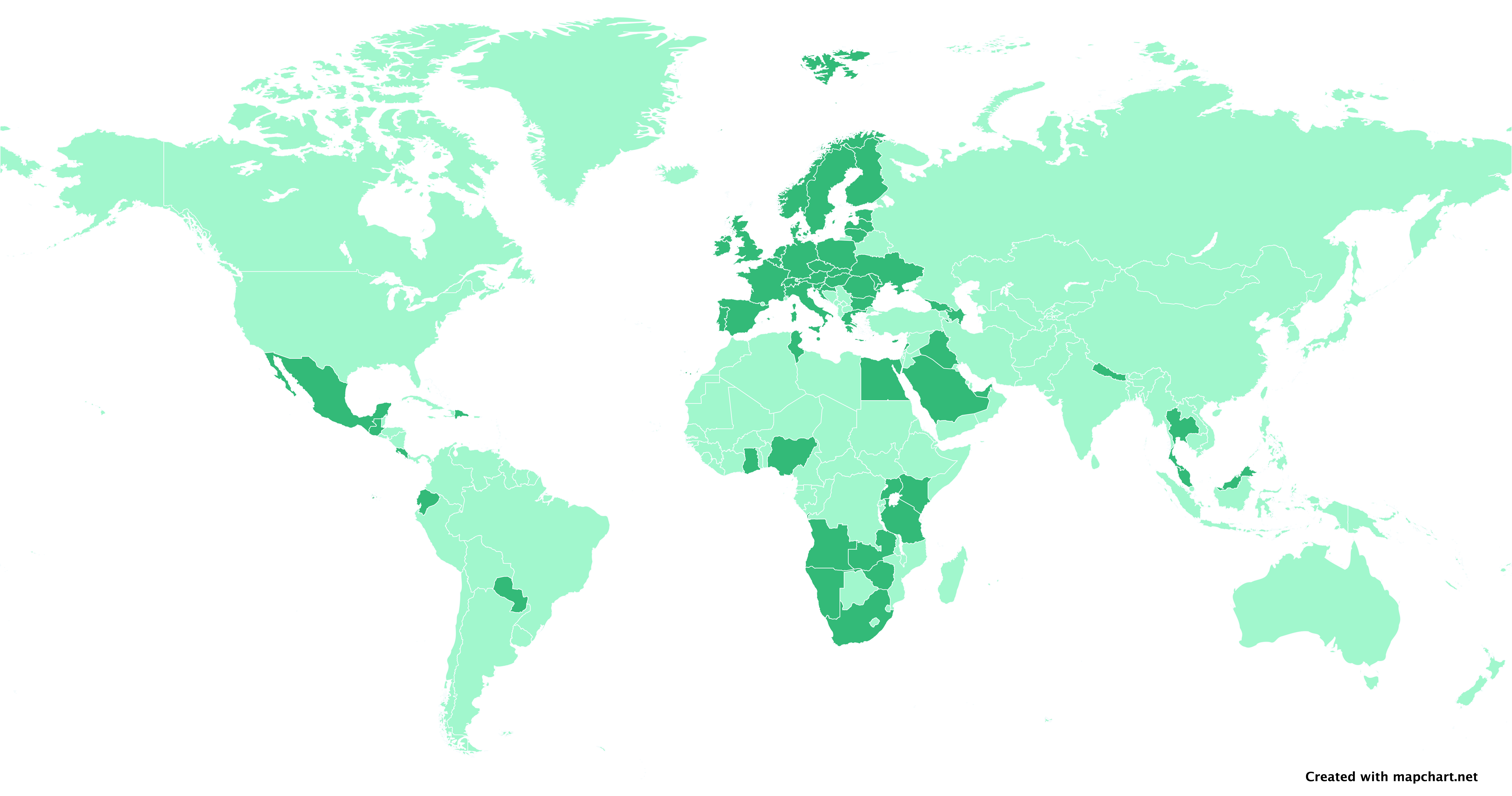
Availability of Bolt, as of Nov 2024: Available Not available

The company was founded in 2013 as Taxify by Markus Villig, then a 19-year-old high-school student. Markus built the prototype of the app while personally recruiting drivers on the streets of Tallinn after receiving a €5000 loan from his family.

The service was launched in Tallinn, Estonia in August 2013, and by 2014, it was operating abroad including in Latvia and Lithuania. By 2016, Bolt had expanded to South Africa, Kenya and Nigeria. In April 2017, it expanded to Baku and Malta. In September 2017, Bolt launched its services in London by acquiring a local taxi company, but was suspended by Transport for London due to licensing issues. In February 2018, the company filed a new licence application and relaunched in London in June 2019. In October 2017, it expanded to Paris. In April 2018, it reached 10 million global users and later that year became the first ride-hailing company to launch electric scooter operations. In March 2019, the company changed its name from Taxify to Bolt. In August 2019, the company launched Bolt Food, a food delivery service in Tallinn. It has since expanded to over 80 cities across 20 countries with over 30,000 restaurants using the platform. In May 2021, Bolt launched Bolt Drive, a car-sharing service which is now present in seven countries across Europe. In September 2021, Bolt launched a grocery delivery service, Bolt Market.

In December 2024 Bolt expanded its services in the Middle East to Dubai. In February 2025 the company launched ride-hailing in the Greater Toronto Area, and scooters in Washington DC under the brand name "Hopp".

In November 2024, Bolt lost a legal challenge in the UK Employment Tribunal over the employment status of its drivers. The Tribunal ruled that Bolt’s drivers qualify as “workers” rather than self-employed independent contractors, as Bolt had argued. This classification means that drivers are entitled to employment benefits, including minimum wage protections. The case was brought by approximately 10,000 current and former drivers seeking minimum wage pay and other employment benefits. Lawyers representing the drivers estimate that Bolt could face a financial liability exceeding £200 million as a result of this decision.

On June 11, 2025, Bolt expanded to New Zealand, with Auckland being the first city to offer the service. As of November, 2026, however, the network is still restricted to Auckland, with food delivery still unavailable and e-scooters not being introduced.

== Financing ==
Initially, Bolt raised over €1 million in investment capital from Estonian and Finnish angel investors. In August 2017, Didi Chuxing invested an undisclosed amount believed to be an "eight-figure U.S. dollar sum". A May 2018 funding round with a $175 million investment from Daimler, Didi and others led to a 1 billion dollar valuation for the company, making it a unicorn.

In January 2020, the European Investment Bank signed a EUR 50 million venture debt facility with Bolt. The financing, supported by the European Fund for Strategic Investments (EFSI), is to boost Bolt's product development in areas where technology can improve the safety, reliability and sustainability of its services. This includes investment in existing services such as vehicle for hire and food delivery, as well as the development of new products.

In December 2020, Bolt raised €150 million from venture capital investment funds. In March 2021, Bolt raised €20 million from International Finance Corporation, a World Bank Group member, for further expansion in emerging markets. The company was valued at more than €2 billion after this fundraising round. In August 2021, Bolt raised €600 million from Sequoia Capital increasing the valuation of the company to over €4 billion. In January 2022, Bolt raised €628 million from investors led by Sequoia Capital and Fidelity Management and Research Co, taking the company's valuation to €7.4 billion. In May 2024, Bolt announced they had raised a €220 million revolving credit facility.

== Products ==
=== Ridesharing ===
Bolt started out as a ridesharing company. The service is offered under the name Bolt Rides. As of 2026, Bolt Rides is available in over 600 cities worldwide. Rides can be booked via Bolt's mobile application, and can be scheduled in advance.

In 2024, ridesharing services accounted for 82 percent of Bolt's revenue.

=== Bolt e-scooters ===
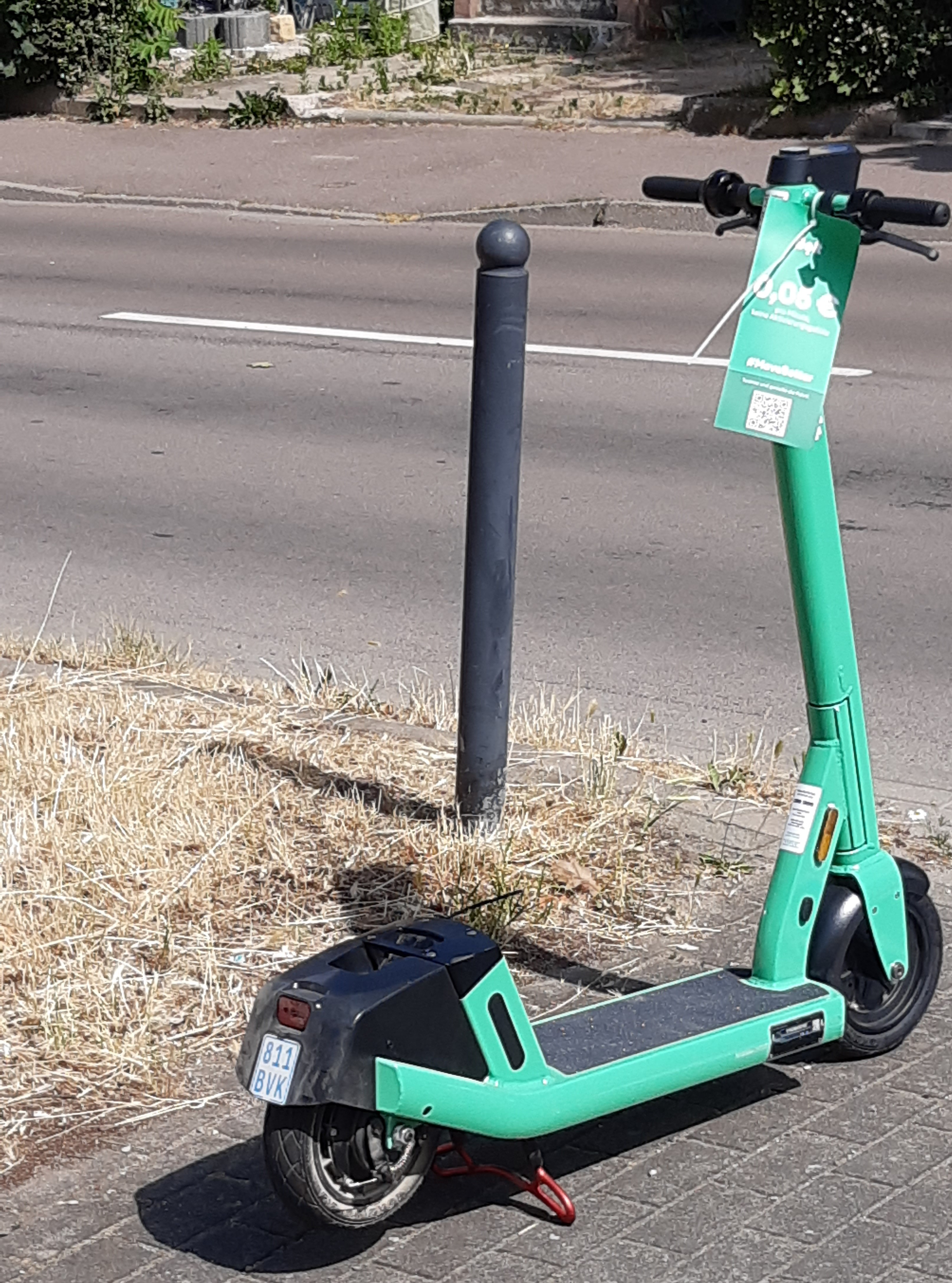
A Bolt Scooter parked in Halle (Saale), Germany.

In September 2018, the company announced it was expanding into micromobility services. After launching scooters in Paris, Bolt expanded its micromobility operations across Europe. In November 2022, Bolt scooters were integrated into the Norwegian MaaS application, Ruter, and in May 2023 — into Berlin’s mobility app, Jelbi. As of February 2023, Bolt has operations in 260 cities across 25 countries and 250,000 shared vehicles available for rental. In June 2023, Bolt introduced their new scooter model — Bolt 6.

=== Bolt e-bikes ===
Two years after launching e-scooters, in May 2020, Bolt launched e-bikes in Paris, France. And in the following years expanded its e-bike operations across many major European cities.

=== Bolt Drive ===
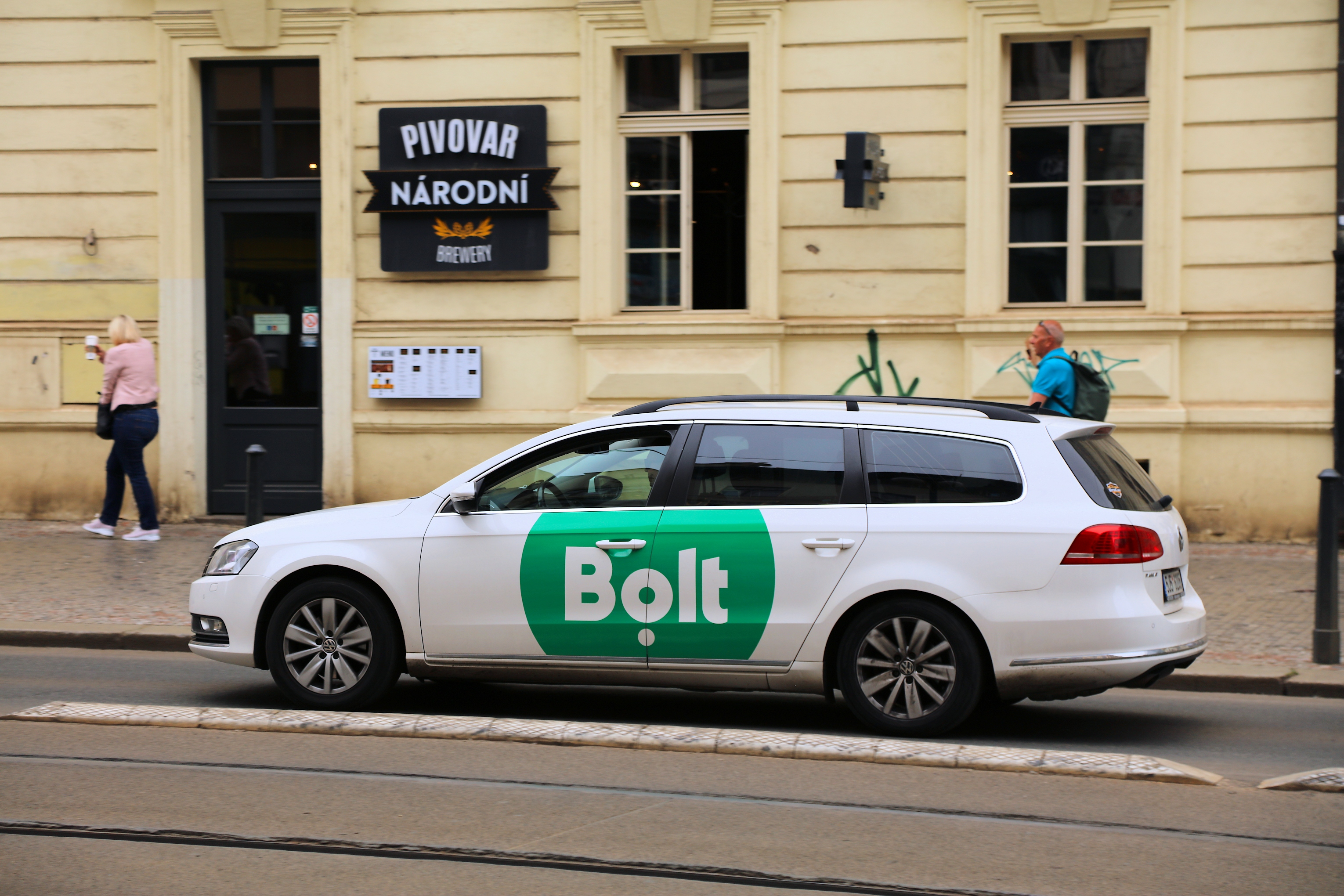
Ride-hailing car in Prague

In May 2021, Bolt launched a car-sharing service, Bolt Drive. Bolt Drive launched in Tallinn, Estonia, and has since expanded to six more countries — Latvia, Lithuania, Germany, Poland, Czechia and Portugal. In May 2023, Bolt entered into leasing framework agreements for a total of €126m with Luminor and Swedbank to enable the expansion of Bolt Drive in the Baltic countries. It had 1,500 car-sharing vehicles in Vilnius 18 months after launch. Bolt's car-sharing service in Vilnius costs from 0.05 euros per minute for Audi Q2 and Peugeot 208.

=== Self-driving cars ===
In August 2019, Bolt and the University of Tartu announced a partnership on an applied research project to develop technology for self-driving cars. In April 2021, Bolt and the University of Tartu expanded their cooperation on the AV project, signing a new 5-year agreement designed to further develop the technical capabilities of the university's autonomous driving lab in the areas of artificial intelligence and maps and algorithms.

In late 2025, Bolt announced its aim to introduce driverless cars to its platform in Europe and signed its first autonomous vehicle partnerships with Pony.ai and Stellantis and its long-term ambition to have 100,000 autonomous vehicles on the Bolt platform by 2035.

=== Food and grocery delivery service ===
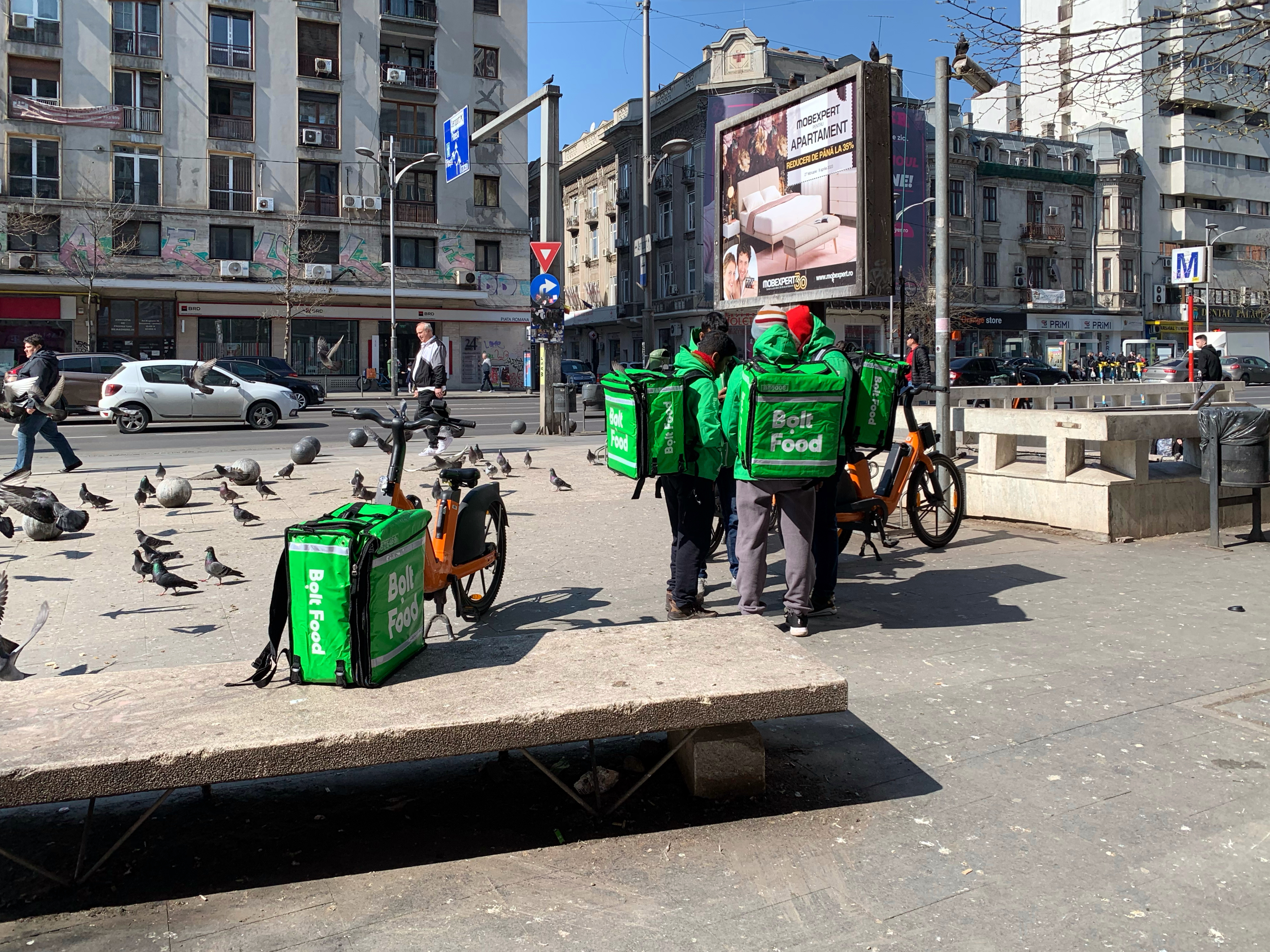
A group of deliverymen for Bolt Food in Bucharest, Romania

In 2021, Bolt launched grocery and food delivery service ("Bolt Food") in the Baltic States, as an app separate from their mobility app. It later expanded to Sweden, Czech Republic, Poland and elsewhere. They also run their own grocery stores ("Bolt Market") in Poland, Romania, Estonia, Lithuania, Latvia, and Portugal, as of 2026. In 2025, they launched advertisements for merchants on the platform, who can pay to secure more visibility in-app through sponsored listings. Bolt plans to eventually deliver groceries with self-driving robots, in partnership with Starship Technologies.

== Support for Ukraine ==
In late February 2022, following the Russian invasion of Ukraine, Bolt announced it was removing all products produced in Russia or associated with Russian companies from Bolt Market, as well as closing down all operations in Belarus due to the country’s enablement of the Russian invasion.

Bolt also announced it would donate 5% of every Bolt order in Europe in the two weeks following the invasion to support Ukraine. This amounted to over €5 million which was distributed to NGOs working on the ground to support Ukraine and its people.

Bolt also pledged to keep its services running in Ukraine during the ongoing Russo-Ukrainian War.
