= Markus Villig =

Estonian entrepreneur (born 1993)

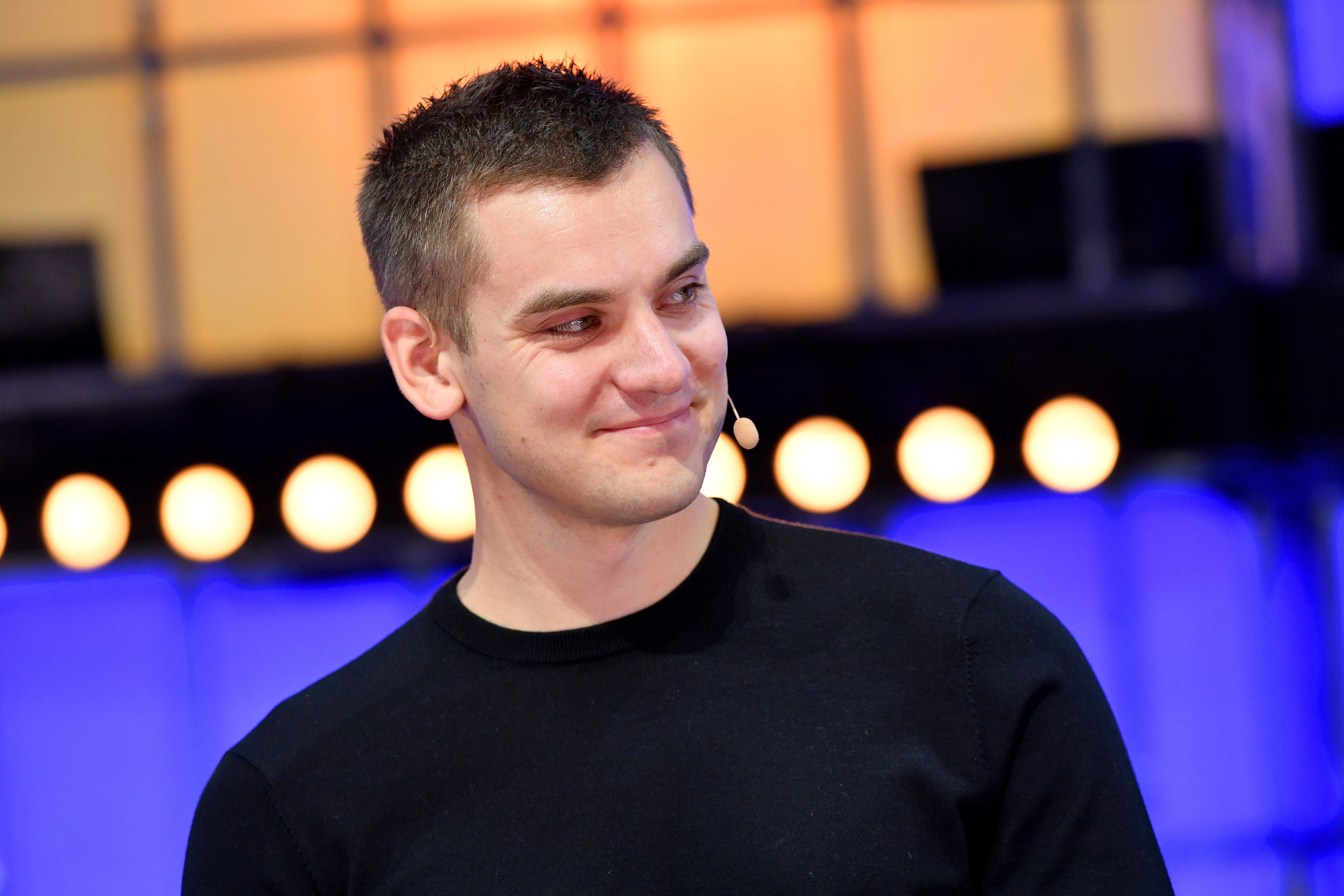
- Villig in 2024
- Born: December 17, 1993 (age 32)
- Title: Founder and CEO of Bolt

Markus Villig (born December 17, 1993) is an Estonian billionaire entrepreneur and founder and CEO of global shared mobility company Bolt Technology OÜ. As of 2019, he is Europe's youngest founder of a billion dollar company (unicorn). Following Bolt's fundraise in late 2021 which saw the company reach an $8.4 billion valuation, Markus became Europe's youngest self-made billionaire aged 27.

== Biography ==
After finishing high school in Tallinn in the spring 2013, Markus began working on the initial development of Bolt. With a €5,000 loan from his family, he was able to create the first prototype of the app while personally recruiting drivers on the streets of Tallinn.

In September 2013 he enrolled at the University of Tartu to study computer science. However, he left at the end of his first semester to work on the company full time.

Markus has received numerous accolades in recognition of his achievements as an entrepreneur. In 2016 he was featured as the youngest CEO in the Forbes 30 under 30 list in the Baltics and also received the presidential award for the Best Young Entrepreneur in Estonia. Additionally, in 2018, he was honored as EY's Estonian Entrepreneur of the Year at the World Entrepreneur of the Year Business Forum. Furthermore, he was named Entrepreneur of the Year by the Estonian national newspaper Äripäev in 2022.

In November 2022, Markus was made a Partner of the Ministry of Foreign Affairs in Estonia, which recognises individuals who support the country’s foreign policy interests, for his contribution in supporting Ukraine following its invasion by Russia.

In March 2025, he was appointed as a board member of Klarna.
