= Palina (Belarusian singer) =

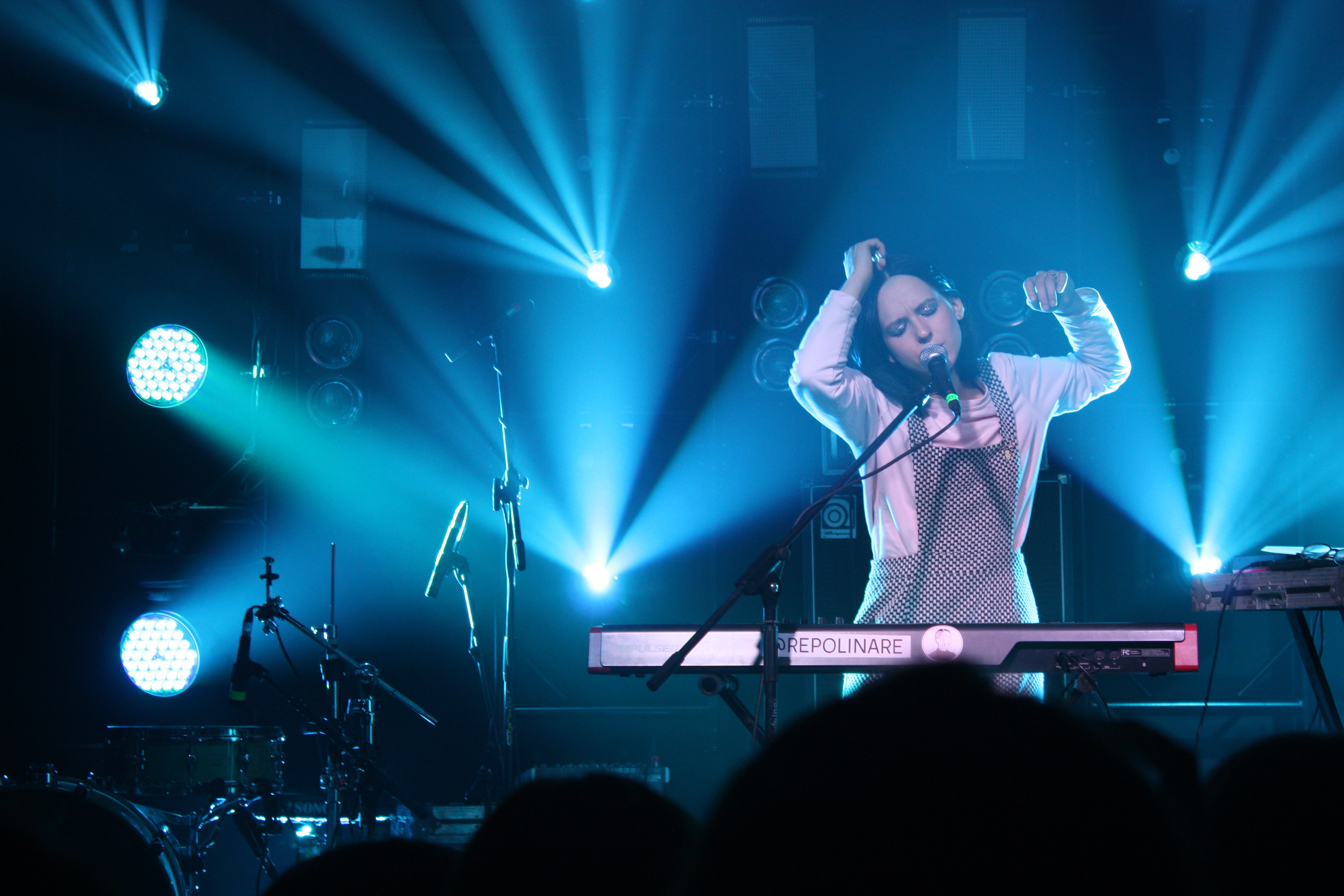
- Palina playing at the Razomfest festival in Lviv in 2018

Background information
- Also known as: Palina Respublika (2012 – 2018): Palina (from 2018)
- Born: Palina Yuryewna Palanyeychyk (Паліна Юр’еўна Паланейчык); 8 April 1994 (age 32); Minsk, Belarus
- Genres: pop
- Instruments: guitar, piano
- Years active: 2012 – present
- Formerly of: Hasta La Fillsta
- Website: repolinare.by

Palina Yuryewna Palanyeychyk (Belarusian: Паліна Юр’еўна Паланейчык; Russian: Полина Юрьевна Полонейчик; (Note: Russian romanization: Polina Yuryevna Poloneychik) born 8 April 1994), known mononymously as Palina (previously Palina Respublika), is a Belarusian singer. Repertoire mainly consists of her own works, and she performs songs in Belarusian, Russian, Ukrainian, and French.

== Biography ==
She studied at gymnasium (high school) №15 of the city of Minsk, from which she graduated in 2011. She has been engaged in the field of women's football.

The first song was written at the age of 14 years in Crimea which prompted her to learn how to play guitar.

The first solo concert was held in Minsk on 24 December 2011 at the opening of the Art-Siadziba. In 2011, she won at the 18th author songs festival "Ballad Fall" (Belarusian: Бардаўская восень) (Bielsk Podlaski, Poland), after which gave dozens of concerts in Belarus and abroad.

According to Tuzin.fm, she is "The opening of the Year" (2011). Also she is the winner in the nomination of “The opening of the Year” at the Ultra-Music Awards (2012).

In 2012 Palina Respublika recorded several joint-singles with the Hasta La Fillsta band ("Yak Ty" and "Gadzinnik"). In the spring of 2015, the debut album "Byaskoncy Krasavik" was being presented to the public. “The high-quality new album” per Experty.by’s Źmicier Biezkaravajny became the second best domestic CD of that year based on the results of a survey of foreign music experts carried out by the Experty.by music portal, after the presentation of which on 15 May 2015 at the creative space Studio 67, she announced the suspension of live performances due family reasons.

In February 2017 the singer was a guest of Siarhei Budkin’s program "Belsat Music Live", where she acted in a new stage format without a guitar and her musical band. In that year she performed the back vocal part on the Helaiv's song "Anxiety" from the "Too Easy" EP.

In 2018 she stripped the "Palina Respublika" pseudonym to just "Palina". She took part in the 9th season of the Ukrainian edition of the "X-Factor" talent show with the author's song "Pinki". On the New Year 2019 she acted and signed in the musical show "We will be not understood in Moscow" (Belarusian: "Нас у Маскве не зразумеюць") by Tuzin.fm, "Belsat Music Live", and Lavon Volski.

At the beginning of 2019 she recorded a joint clip for the song "Wada" with Intelligency. On 15 April Palina released the second album called "Grustnye Pesni" combined her works for past three years.

== Criticism ==
Editor of the Ultra-Music music portal Alexandr Chernuha called lyrics of the singer quite mediocre. The bulk of the staff of the experty.by music portal appreciated album "Byaskoncy Krasavik": "quiet, warm, lyrical music", "pleasant and enough catchy melodies and soft vocals", "naive and pure music", "it can not be said that the Palina's band found its sound, but the fact is that it is on the right path – that is for sure".

== Appraisal ==
Lesley Knife, vocalist of the Gods Tower band, compared the works of the Belarusian singer with Enya's ones in 2014.

== Bans ==
After the interviews of Belsat TV and Narodnaya Volya with the singer in 2012, her concert, which was supposed to be held in Vitebsk the next day, was canceled.

== Recognition ==
In 2018 the music portal Tuzin.fm together with Letapis.by selected the song "Yak Ty" in the top of "60 today's hits in the Belarusian language", a list of best songs released since 1988.

In the retrospect of 2010-2019 in 2019, Lesha Gorbash from 34mag called the singer “a significant Belarusian artist of the decade, without which it is difficult to imagine the today's local scene.”

== Discography ==
- "Yak Ty" (feat. Hasta La Fillsta) (single, 2012)
- "Gadzinnik" (feat. Hasta La Fillsta) (single, 2012)
- "Byaskoncy Krasavik" (album, 2015)
- "Wada" (feat. Intelligency) (single, 2019)
- "Grustnye Pesni" (album, 2019)

=== Participation in collections ===
- "Nas U Maskve Ne Zrazumeyuc’" (2019), track "Cudouny Vechar" ("Novaje Nieba" cover)

== Videography ==
- «Утро» (2013)
- «Pinky» (2019)

== Band members ==
- Palina – vocals, guitar, piano (2012–)

Former members

- Vladimir Pylchanko – guitar, accordion, piano (2013–2017)
- Vadim "James Gluck" Stepanovich – bass guitar (2013–2017)
- Alexandra Aleksyuk – cello (2013–2017)
- Yuriy Martynov – drums (2013–2017)

Timeline
