= Oleh Vynnyk =

Ukrainian singer (born 1973)

Oleh Vynnyk Олег Винник
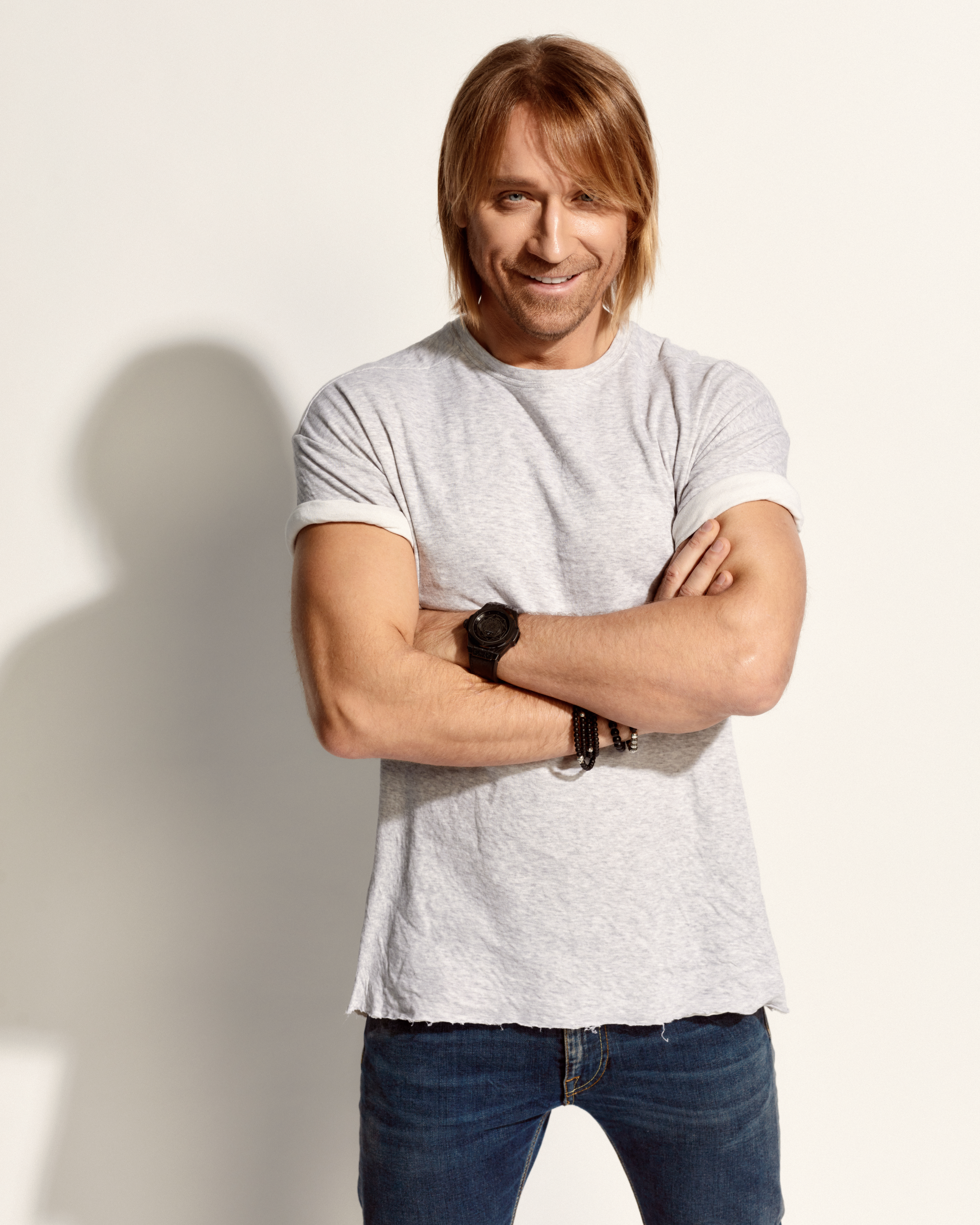

Background information
- Born: Oleh Anatoliiovych Vynnyk (Олег Анатолійович Винник); 31 July 1973 (age 52)
- Origin: Verbivka, Kamianka Raion, Cherkasy Oblast, Ukrainian SSR (now Ukraine)
- Genres: Pop, Pop Rock
- Occupation: singer
- Years active: 1993–present
- Website: www.olegg.com

Oleh Vynnyk (Ukrainian: Олег Винник, born 31 July 1973) is a Ukrainian electronic pop musician and actor. He has performed in Germany, Austria and Switzerland as a lead actor of several musicals under the stage name OLEGG.

== Biography ==
=== Early years ===
Oleh Vynnyk was born on 31 July 1973 in the village of Verbivka, Kamianka Raion, currently Cherkasy Raion, of Cherkasy Oblast, Ukraine. He graduated from High School in the village of Chervony Kut (Zhashkiv Raion, currently Uman Raion, Cherkasy Oblast). He sang and played the electric guitar at a young age.

=== Career ===
After high school, Vynnyk entered a choirmaster department of the Kaniv school of culture in Kaniv, Cherkasy Oblast. Vynnyk's first job after graduation was with the Cherkasy Regional Philharmonic.

As part of a cultural exchange program, Vynnyk received an internship in Germany. During the internship, he worked with the Theater Lüneburg in Lower Saxony, where he continued his career in the performing party "Toska" opera and operetta "Paganini".

Vynnyk's most well-known role was in the musical "Les Miserables", based on the novel by Victor Hugo.

Starting in 2011, Oleh Vynnyk concentrated on his solo career and moved to Ukraine from Germany.

In 2021, the artist started having health problems. Later it became known that Vynnyk was undergoing treatment in Germany, where he had officially lived for more than 20 years. In 2022, the singer created a charity fund to help the Ukrainian army.

=== Political Stance ===
Vynnyk so far did not perform in Russia, even though he was offered a chance to perform three nights in the Saint Petersburg's Ice Palace in December 2017.
