= NK (singer) =

Ukrainian singer (born 1987)

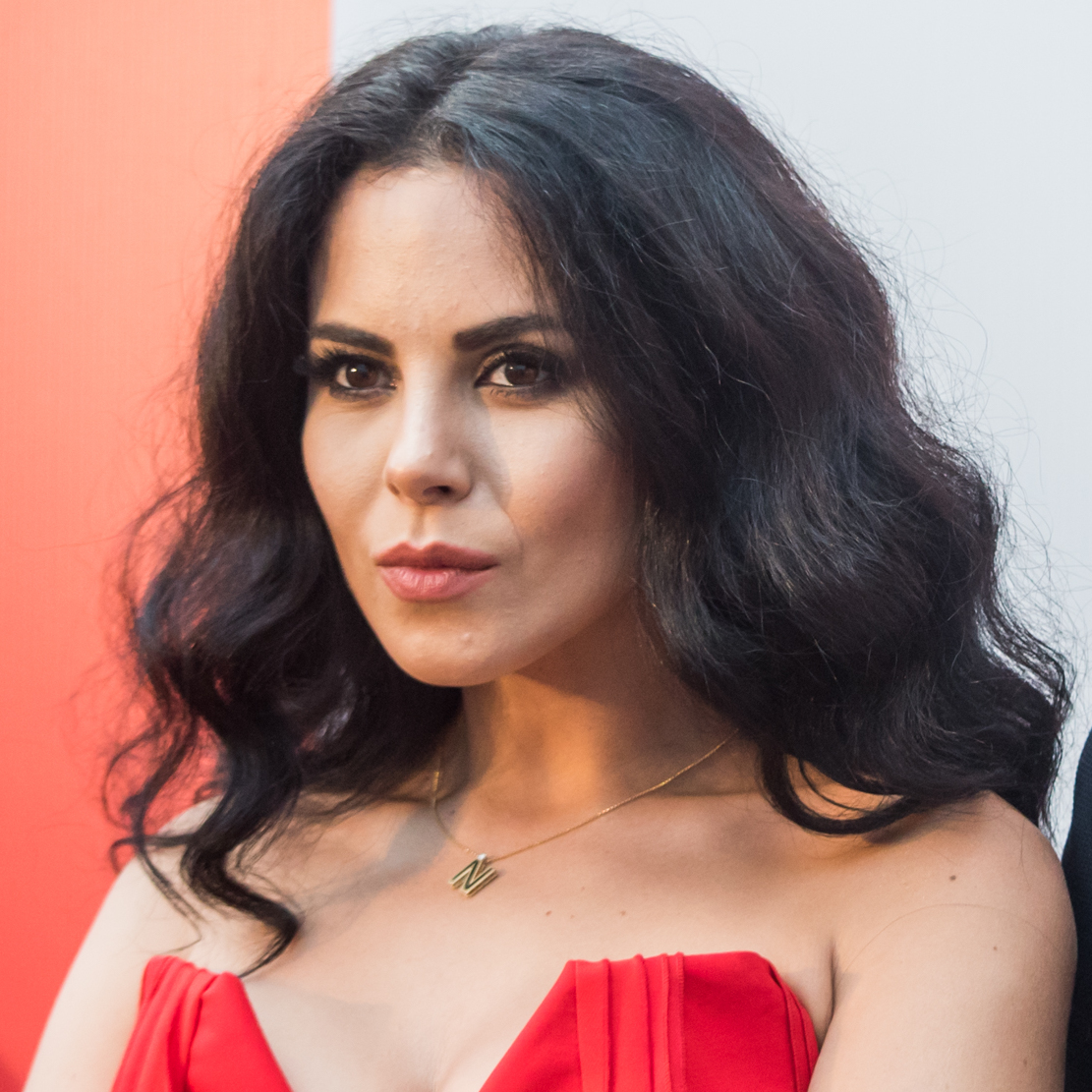
- Born: Anastasiia Oleksiivna Kamenskykh; 4 May 1987 (age 39); Kyiv, Ukrainian SSR, Soviet Union
- Occupations: singer; actress
- Years active: 2004–present
- Spouse: Oleksii Potapenko (2019-2026)
- Website: www.nkofficial.com

Anastasiia Oleksiivna Kamenskykh (Ukrainian: Анастасія Олексіївна Каменських; born 4 May 1987), known professionally as NK, is a Ukrainian pop and R&B singer, actress, television personality, and businesswoman.

== Childhood life and education ==
Was born in Kyiv, Ukraine. At the age of five, she took part in educational programs for family exchanges and lived some time in France. At the age of 6, she moved to Italy and lived there for seven years. She continued studying at the Pechersk School International in Kyiv and at music school. NK graduated from music school at the age of 15 and started taking professional ballet classes. She did ballet for 8 years. She also was a student at the Wisconsin International University in Ukraine.

Speaks five languages: Ukrainian (although she declared she is psychologically blocked to speak it), Russian, English, Italian, and Spanish.

== Music career ==
In 2004, NK debuted as a singer at the Black Sea Games festival, where she received a grand prize and won all kinds of awards. One year later, she received the UBN Awards at the Opening of the Year nomination in London in 2005.

During 2006–2017, NK performed as part of the duo Potap & Nastya alongside Oleksii Potapenko. The duo became very popular and received multiple awards and worldwide prominence.

In 2017, she began her solo project NK. That year she debuted her first solo video and song "#etomoyanoch" ["#thatsmytypeofnight"] which went viral on social media. That same year she released a Christmas acoustic album and Christmas video Xmas with NK which featured famous Christmas hits in four languages (English, Italian, Russian, and Ukrainian) as well as original songs written by NK herself. In 2014, Potap and Kamenskih were criticized in Ukraine for continuing to attend award ceremonies in Russia, while Ukraine was under Russian aggression. On this, they responded: "It's a shame that we have to collect the journalists to tell them that we are from Ukraine and love our country!" In 2016, "Potap and Nastya" concerts were disrupted in Ukraine in protest of their continuing tour in Russia.

After the release of the first song, each following track by NK achieved multimillion views on YouTube. The next song to be released was “Dai Mne” in March 2018. It was followed by another original "Trymay" ["Hold"] written by NK herself. The song sounded in every leading music chart in Ukraine. Moreover, in September 2018 NK exclusively presented her Ukrainian song "Trymay" on the biggest Italian radio station Radio Rai.

Shortly after, NK released a song written in English and Spanish called "Peligroso". The song was written in collaboration with multiple Latin Grammy Awards winners Yoel Henriquez, Cris Chil (composer), and Potap (composer) and produced by Ali Alvarez. The song was presented at the most popular TV and radio shows in Latin America including ¡Despierta América! on Univision, Total Acceso and Titulares y Más on Telemundo, Centro on WBZ4 and ¡Hola! TV. As part of the "Peligroso" promotional tour, NK also attended the 2018 Latin Recording Academy Person of the Year gala and the 19th Annual Latin Grammy Awards ceremony, becoming the first artist from Ukraine to be invited there. "Peligroso" peaked at number 24 on Billboard's Tropical Songs chart and remained there for six weeks. On March 29, 2019, a reggaeton artist De La Ghetto featured in the official remix of "Peligroso". The release was supported by an official music video in which both NK and De La Ghetto took part. The video generated over a million views within the first day of the upload.

On October 12, 2018, NK released her first solo album No Komments, and a video for the song "LOMALA". The album includes 10 tracks written in English, Ukrainian, and Russian.

On February 14, 2019, NK released an official music video for "Popa Kak U Kim" - one of the most popular songs from the first solo album No Komments. The video went viral right away, making it the #1 Trending video on YouTube with over 2 million views within the first 24 hours. The singer was also featured on the cover of Cosmopolitan magazine in Ukraine that month.

The next release by the artist followed on April 25, 2019, with the Ukrainian language song "Обіцяю" ["I Promise"] along with the official music video for it.

On July 8, 2019, NK appeared as a Guest Star on the stage of the Palace of Sports for Maluma's very first show in Ukraine.

== TV career ==
2007 – Dancing with the Stars star participant on the 1+1 channel in Ukraine

2008 – a star participant in the TV project on the First channel Two Stars in Russia

2010 – a star participant in the vocal TV project on the 1+1 channel Star + Star in Ukraine

2010 - a TV presenter of the Guten Morgen morning program on the M1 music channel in Ukraine

Since 2016 – a TV presenter of the children's version of the program Make a comedian laugh, Children on 1+1 channel in Ukraine

Since 2017 till now - a judge and mentor of The X-Factor. In 2018, NK's protégé ZBSband became the winner of the 9th season of the show. They were the first band to win it ever.

2017 – special Christmas movie and acoustic album Xmas with NK

== Business career ==
In 2017, NK launched her brand of sportswear, NKsport. The brand has produced 10 separate collections since 2017.

== Other ==
Since 2015, she has run her lifestyle video blog NKBLOG on YouTube.

Since 2017, she is a regular participant in the charity program "Charity Weekend". Funds collected from concert programs are transferred to the Institute of Traumatology and Orthopedics of the National Academy of Medical Sciences of Ukraine.

In 2017, NK started cooperating with a charity organization "Giznelub" ["Cheerful Person"]. She actively participates in collecting clothes as well as giving away food to senior citizens on an ongoing basis. By 2018, she was involved in two campaigns. The singer also launched an auction selling personal and concert clothing to collect funds for the same purpose. All the donations are forwarded to open spots where seniors could get free food and clothes daily. In 2018, she helped to open 2 spots of that kind.

In 2018, NK was an honorary friend of the UEFA Women's Champion League 2018.

== Music activity in figures ==
Albums	8
Videos	34
Magazine covers	more than 50
Number of awards	more than 50

== Discography ==
=== Studio albums ===
==== Potap & Nastya ====
- Ne para (2008)
- Ne lubi mne mozgi (2009)
- Vse puchkom (2013)
- Shchit i miach (2015)

==== NK ====
- Xmas with NK (2017)
- No Komments (2018)
- Ecléctica (EP, 2020)
- Красное вино (2021)

=== Singles ===
==== NK ====
- 2005 — "Kakaya raznitsa"
- 2016 — "Abnimos/Dosvidos" (feat. Nadya Dorofeeva)
- 2017 — "#etomoyanoch" (#thatsmytypeofnight)
- 2018 — "Day mne"
- 2018 — "Trymai"
- 2018 — "Lomala"
- 2018 — "Peligroso"
- 2019 — "Popa Kak U Kim"
- 2019 — "Obitsiaiu"
- 2019 — "Elefante"
- 2020 — "Miami" (feat. Jacob Forever & Jessy Frank)
- 2020 — "Lollipop" (feat. Juan Magan)
- 2020 — "A huevo"
- 2020 — "Película"
- 2020 — Vibe
- 2021 — "Pochuttia"

==== Potap & Nastya ====
- 2006 — "Bez lyubvi"
- 2007 — "Ne para"
- 2007 — "Vnature"
- 2007 — "Krepkie oreshki"
- 2008 — "Razgulyai"
- 2008 — "Na rayone"
- 2008 — "Pochemu"
- 2009 — "Ne lyubi mne mozgi"
- 2010 — "Novyi god"
- 2010 — "Cry me a river"
- 2010 — "Leto"
- 2010 — "Chipsy, chiksy, lavandos (Selo)"
- 2010 — "Ty vlip Phillip"
- 2011 — "Vykrutasy"
- 2011 — "Chumachechaya Vesna"
- 2011 — "My otmenyaem K.S"
- 2011 — "Esli vdrug"
- 2012 — "Prilileto"
- 2012 — "Uleleto"
- 2013 — "RuRuRu"
- 2013 — "Vmeste"
- 2013 — "Vsio puchkom"
- 2014 — "Udi Udi"
- 2015 — "Bumdigigibye"
- 2015 — "Stil' sobachki" (feat. Bianka)
- 2016 — "Umamy"
- 2016 — "Zolotye kity"
- 2017 — "Ya...(ya)dovitaya"

== Awards ==
YEAR	AWARD	NOMINATION	NOMINATED WORK	RESULT
2004	Black Sea Games Festival	Grand Prix	NK	Winner
2005	UBN Awards London	«Opening of the Year»	NK	Winner
2007	5 STARS	Awardee of the festival	Project «Potap & Nastia»	Winner (the Grand Prix)
2007	New songs about the most important things	Best song	«Ne Para» (rus. Not a couple)	Winner
2008	MUZ-TV Awards	Breakthrough of the Year	Project «Potap & Nastia»	Winner
2009	VIVA Awards	Most beautiful singer	NK	Winner
2010	Award Showbiz index 2010	The most popular video of the year among Internet users	Don't love my brains (rus. Ne liubi mne mozgi)	Winner
2011	Awards RU.TV	Most beautiful couple	Project «Potap & Nastia»	Special prize
2011	Golden Gramophone (St. Petersburg)	Awardee of the festival	Chumachechaya Vesna (rus. Crazy Spring)	Winner
2011	20 best songs	Best song of the year	Chumachechaya Vesna (rus. Crazy Spring)	Winner
2011	The song of the year	Best song	Chumachechaya Vesna (rus. Crazy Spring)	Winner
2011	Star results of the year	Best song according to the TV channel NTV	Chumachechaya Vesna (rus. Crazy Spring)	Winner
2012	Sound track – Moscow Komsomolets	Duo of the Year	Project «Potap & Nastia»	Winner
2012	20 best songs	Best song of the year	What if (rus. Esli vrug)	Winner
2012	Golden Gramophone (St. Petersburg)	Awardee of the festival	What if (rus. Esli vrug)	Winner
2012	Awards RU.TV	Best band	Project «Potap & Nastia»	Winner
2012	Best song of the year	Best song	Prileleto	Winner
2013	Red Star(Krasnaya zvezda)	20 best songs	What if (rus. Esli vrug)	Winner
2013	National award "Golden Wave" (Georgia)	Best Foreign Group	Project «Potap & Nastia»	Winner
2013	Song of the year	Best song	Everything is cool (rus. Vse puchkom)	Winner
2014	Song of the year (Ukraine)	Best song	Everything is cool (rus. Vse puchkom)	Winner
2014	Awards RU.TV	Best video	Everything is cool (rus. Vse puchkom)	Winner
2014	Golden Gramophone (St. Petersburg)	For a song	Everything is cool (rus. Vse puchkom)	Winner
2014	Award «Song of the Year – 2014» (Ukraine)	Folk song	Udi-Udi	Winner
2015	M1 Music Awards	Band of the Year	Project «Potap & Nastia»	Winner
2015	M1 Music Awards	Award of the hit parade "Golden Gramophone", the general project "M1" and the radio station "Russian Radio Ukraine"	Project «Potap & Nastia»	Winner
2016	M1 Music Awards – PRE-Party	The best promo-campaign of the tour	«Potap & Nastia»10 years. Golden whales»	Winner
2016	The "New Radio" Award "Major League"	Best song	At mom	Laureates
2016	M1 Music Awards	Hit of the Year	At mom	Winner
2017	M1 Music Awards	For contribution to the development of national industry	Project «Potap & Nastia»	Winner
2017	Award TRC Ukraine	Newsmaker of the year	Project NK	Winner
2017	Music Platform TRC Ukraine	Best Christmas song	Project NK	Winner
2017	Media Siesta (award of journalists of Ukraine)	Newsmaker of the year	Project NK	Winner
2017	M1 Music Awards	Video of the winter 2017	Project NK	Winner
2018	M1 Music Awards	The singer of spring 2018	Project NK	Winner
2018	Cosmopolitan Awards	Singer of the year	Project NK	Winner
2018	M1 Music Awards	Female Artist of the Year	Project NK	Winner
2018	M1 Music Awards	Music Video of the Year	Project NK	Winner
2018	TV Channel Ukraine Awards	Best International Star	Project NK	Winner
2019	YUNA Music Awards	Best Pop Hit	Project NK	Winner

Preceded by Tina Karol	Most beautiful by VIVA! 2009; With: Konstantin Meladze	Succeeded by Vera Brezhneva
